= List of German films of the 1990s =

This is a list of the most notable films produced in Cinema of Germany in the 1990s.

For an alphabetical list of articles on German films see Category:1990s German films.

== 1990 ==
Title	Director	Cast	Genre	Notes
Abraham's Gold	Jörg Graser	Hanna Schygulla, Günther Maria Halmer	Drama	Screened at the 1990 Cannes Film Festival
Affengeil	Rosa von Praunheim	Lotti Huber	Documentary	a.k.a. Life is Like a Cucumber
The African Woman	Margarethe von Trotta	Stefania Sandrelli, Barbara Sukowa, Sami Frey	Drama	a.k.a. Die Rückkehr. Italian-French-West German co-production
Albert Einstein	Georg Schiemann	Tālivaldis Āboliņš	Biography	
Alles im Griff	Joachim Roering	Ralf Richter, Werner Kreindl, Hans Korte	Comedy	
Amaurose	Dieter Funk	Otto Sander, Bernd Tauber, Milva	Drama	
Ein anderer Liebhaber	Xaver Schwarzenberger	Karlheinz Hackl, Rolf Henniger, Petra Maria Grühn, Friedrich von Thun, Alexander May, Lisa Kreuzer, Winfried Hübner	Drama	a.k.a. The Prison
The Beatles Forever	Gedeon Kovács	Angelica Domröse, Joachim Bißmeier	Drama	
Der Bettler vom Kurfürstendamm	Claus Peter Witt	Hans Clarin	Comedy	
Der Bierkönig	Tom Toelle	Raf Vallone, Laure Marsac, Wera Frydtberg, Dieter Kirchlechner	Drama	a.k.a. Le Roi de la bière
Bismarck	Tom Toelle	Uwe Ochsenknecht	Biography, History	
Der blaue Mond	Monika Schmid	Beatrice Manowski, Ludvik Mann, Rolf Zacher, Adelheid Arndt	Comedy	
Bread and Butter	Gabriel Barylli	Gabriel Barylli, Uwe Ochsenknecht, Heinz Hoenig	Comedy	a.k.a. Butterbrot
Buster's Bedroom	Rebecca Horn	Amanda Ooms, Donald Sutherland, Geraldine Chaplin, Valentina Cortese	Comedy	West German-Canadian-Portuguese co-production
Café Europa	Franz Xaver Bogner	Barbara Auer, Jacques Breuer, August Zirner, Mario Adorf, Raimund Harmstorf	Comedy	
Carmen on Ice	Horant H. Hohlfeld	Katarina Witt, Brian Boitano, Brian Orser	Dance	
The Complaint of an Empress	Pina Bausch	Mechthild Großmann, Dominique Mercy, Jan Minarik, Mark Sieczkarek	Dance	a.k.a. Die Klage der Kaiserin
A Crazy Couple	Sönke Wortmann	Barbara Auer, Thomas Heinze	Comedy	a.k.a. Eine Wahnsinnsehe
Dana Lech	Frank Guido Blasberg	Brygida Mich	Drama	
Death of a Schoolboy	Peter Patzak	Reuben Pillsbury, Philippe Léotard, Christopher Chaplin, Robert Munic, Sinolička Trpkova, Alan Cox, Hartmut Becker, Hans-Michael Rehberg, Alexis Arquette, Slobodan Dimitrijević, Zaim Muzaferija, Ivica Pajer	Biography, History	a.k.a. Gavre Princip – Himmel unter Steinen. Austrian-German co-production
Dort oben im Wald bei diesen Leuten	Peter Keglevic	Günter Lamprecht	Crime	
Dr. M	Claude Chabrol	Alan Bates, Jennifer Beals, Andrew McCarthy, Jan Niklas, Hanns Zischler, Wolfgang Preiss	Thriller, Science fiction	French-West German-Italian co-production
Drehort Pfarrhaus	Jörg Grünler	Gottfried John, Cornelia Froboess, Joachim Bißmeier, Dieter Pfaff, Gedeon Burkhard	Drama	
Drunter und drüber	Franz Josef Gottlieb	Susanne Uhlen, Herbert Herrmann, Manfred Zapatka, Hans Clarin, Manfred Lehmann	Crime comedy	a.k.a. A Desperate Hour
Echoes from a Sombre Empire	Werner Herzog		Documentary	
The Eighth Day	Reinhard Münster	Katharina Thalbach, Hans Christian Blech, Hannelore Elsner, Heinz Hoenig, Lukas Ammann, Peter Simonischek	Thriller	a.k.a. The 8th Day
Der Eindringling	Sigi Rothemund	Constanze Engelbrecht, Dieter Landuris, Wolf Roth	Drama	
Das einfache Glück	Edzard Onneken	Jürgen Tonkel, Ariane Pestalozzi	Drama	
Embezzled Heaven	Ottokar Runze	Elisabeth Epp, Paulus Manker, Peter Simonischek, Nikolaus Paryla, Gertraud Jesserer, Bernhard Schir	Drama	a.k.a. Der veruntreute Himmel
Europa Europa	Agnieszka Holland	Marco Hofschneider, Julie Delpy, Hanns Zischler, André Wilms	World War II Drama	a.k.a. Hitlerjunge Salomon. German-French-Polish co-production. 1991 Golden Globe Winner for Best Foreign Film; 1991 Academy Award Nominee for Best Writing Adapted Screenplay
Falsche Spuren	Wolf Dietrich	Heidelinde Weis, Klaus Schwarzkopf, Radost Bokel	Crime	a.k.a. Mystery of the Red Red Herrings
Farewell Sidonia	Karin Brandauer	Kitty Speiser, Georg Marin, Arghavan Sadeghi-Seragi	Drama, War	a.k.a. Sidonie. Austrian-German co-production
Fire, Ice and Dynamite	Willy Bogner Jr.	Roger Moore, Shari Belafonte, Uwe Ochsenknecht	Action comedy	
The Gamblers	Dominik Graf	Peter Lohmeyer, Anica Dobra, Hansa Czypionka, Anthony Dawson	Comedy	
Gefährliche Verführung	Cinzia TH Torrini	Leslie Malton, Stephen Brennan, Jean-Claude Bouillon, Aurore Clément, Winfried Glatzeder, Günter Meisner	Thriller	a.k.a. Stolen Minds a.k.a. Il piccolo popolo. Italian-West German co-production
Das Geheimnis des gelben Geparden	Carlo Rola	Iris Berben, Pierre Malet, Susanne Lothar	Thriller	a.k.a. Spells of Evil. West German-French co-production
The German Chainsaw Massacre	Christoph Schlingensief	Karina Fallenstein, Udo Kier, Alfred Edel, Volker Spengler, Irm Hermann	Horror	a.k.a. Blackest Heart
Die Gleichung geht nicht auf	Michel Favart	Dietlinde Turban, Jean-Pierre Bisson	Thriller	a.k.a. The Tube a.k.a. L'ingénieur aimait trop les chiffres. French-West German co-production
Great Mass in C minor, K. 427 (Wolfgang Amadeus Mozart)	Humphrey Burton	Leonard Bernstein, Bavarian Radio Symphony Orchestra	Concert	
Die Hallo-Sisters	Ottokar Runze	Ilse Werner, Gisela May, Harald Juhnke, Tuncel Kurtiz	Drama	
Der Hammermörder	Bernd Schadewald	Christian Redl	Thriller	
Das Haus am Watt	Sigi Rothemund	Gudrun Landgrebe, Hannes Jaenicke, Hanns Zischler	Thriller	
The Handmaid's Tale	Volker Schlöndorff	Natasha Richardson, Faye Dunaway, Aidan Quinn, Elizabeth McGovern, Victoria Tennant, Robert Duvall	Dystopian	American-West German co-production
Herz mit Löffel	Richard Blank	Otto Grünmandl, Rosel Zech, Marianne Sägebrecht, Adelheid Arndt, Hannelore Schroth, Tilo Prückner	Comedy	(Shot in 1987)
Herzlich willkommen	Hark Bohm	Uwe Bohm, Barbara Auer	Drama	a.k.a. Welcome Indeed! a.k.a. Crossing Borders. Entered into the 40th Berlin International Film Festival
High Score	Gustav Ehmck	James Brolin, Hannes Jaenicke, Gudrun Landgrebe, Alexis Arquette, Anne Carlisle, Ralf Wolter	Science fiction	
Hopnick	Detlev Buck	Detlev Buck, Sophie Rois	Comedy	
Hüpfendes Fleisch	Sylvia Hoffman	Christian Doermer, Liane Hielscher, Sabine Kaack, Hermann Treusch	Crime	
In inniger Feindschaft	Claude Faraldo	Hildegard Knef, Micheline Presle, Inge Meysel	Thriller	a.k.a. Champ clos. French-West German co-production
Der Kameramann	Nicolai Karo	Dieter Kirchlechner, Margit Geissler	Drama	
Kann ich noch ein bisschen bleiben?	Rolf von Sydow	Heidelinde Weis	Drama	a.k.a. Kann ich noch ein bißchen bleiben?
Kill Cruise	Peter Keglevic	Elizabeth Hurley, Patsy Kensit, Jürgen Prochnow	Thriller	a.k.a. Der Skipper
König der Eidechsen	Andreas Piontkowitz	Martin Plass, Harald Kleber	Comedy	a.k.a. The Lizard King
Die Kupferfalle	Detlef Rönfeldt	Leslie Malton, Peter Bongartz, Klaus J. Behrendt, Ivan Desny	Drama	
Landläufiger Tod	Michael Schottenberg	Karl Ferdinand Kratzl, Paulus Manker, Helmut Griem, Karl Michael Vogler, Mercedes Echerer, Heinz Schubert, Bernhard Minetti	Crime drama	Austrian-German co-production
Letzten Sommer in Kreuzberg	Eberhard Itzenplitz	Heike Faber, Dieter Landuris	Comedy	
Eine Liebe in Istanbul	Jürgen Haase	Oliver Rohrbeck, Jale Arıkan, Rolf Becker	Drama	a.k.a. One Love in Istanbul
Liebe, Tod und Eisenbahn	Gert Steinheimer	Heiner Lauterbach, Christina Scholz	Black comedy	
Liebe und Maloche	Bettina Woernle	Jürgen Heinrich, Martin Lüttge, Tilo Prückner	Drama	
Little Herr Friedemann	Peter Vogel	Ulrich Mühe	Drama	
Marleneken	Karin Brandauer	Hannelore Hoger, Nina Hoger, Karin Baal, Elisabeth Trissenaar	Drama	
Martha and I	Jiří Weiss	Michel Piccoli, Marianne Sägebrecht	Drama	Czechoslovak-French-West German co-production
The Master of the Day of Judgment	Michael Kehlmann	Helmuth Lohner, Michael Degen, Ernst Stankovski, Alexander Kerst, Günter Mack	Mystery	a.k.a. The Master of Doomsday. Austrian-German co-production
Mich will ja keiner	Sigi Rothemund	Steven Bennett, Ursela Monn, Peter Sattmann, Sabina Trooger	Drama	a.k.a. Nobody Wants Me
Die Ministranten	Wolfram Paulus	Christoph Schnell, Gerald Bachler, Nikolaus Dobrowolsky, Stefan Steger	Drama	Austrian-West German co-production
Moffengriet	Eberhard Itzenplitz	Annemarie Steen	Drama, War	
Moon 44	Roland Emmerich	Michael Paré, Lisa Eichhorn, Malcolm McDowell	Science fiction	
The Mountain	Markus Imhoof	Susanne Lothar, Mathias Gnädinger, Peter Simonischek	Drama	Swiss-Austrian-German co-production
The Nasty Girl	Michael Verhoeven	Lena Stolze, Rudolf Schündler, Monika Baumgartner, Fred Stillkrauth	Drama	a.k.a. Das schreckliche Mädchen. Verhoeven won the Silver Bear at Berlin; 1990 Academy Award Nominee for Best Foreign Film
Der neue Mann	Konrad Sabrautzky	Maja Maranow, Edgar Selge, Dieter Kirchlechner, Billie Zöckler, Karin Baal	Comedy	
Neuner	Werner Masten	Manfred Krug, Klaus Wennemann, Claudia Wedekind	Drama	
The NeverEnding Story II: The Next Chapter	George T. Miller	Jonathan Brandis, Kenny Morrison, Clarissa Burt, Alexandra Johnes	Fantasy	German-American co-production
Nie im Leben	Helmut Berger, Nina Grosse	Anica Dobra, Hans Peter Hallwachs, Helmut Berger	Crime comedy	a.k.a. Never in Life. Austrian-German co-production
Notenwechsel	Franz Peter Wirth	Klaus Herm, Stefan Wigger	Crime comedy	
November Days	Marcel Ophuls		Documentary	British-German co-production
Parfum für eine Selbstmörderin	Alain Bonnot	Leslie Malton, Jean-Claude Dauphin, Angelo Infanti, Marie-José Nat	Thriller	a.k.a. La mort a dit peut-être. French-West German co-production
Peter in Magicland	Wolfgang Urchs	—N/a	Animated	
Positive	Rosa von Praunheim		Documentary	
Quiet Days in Clichy	Claude Chabrol	Andrew McCarthy, Nigel Havers, Barbara De Rossi, Mario Adorf, Stéphane Audran	Drama	French-West German-Italian co-production
Der Rausschmeißer	Xaver Schwarzenberger	Claudia Messner, David Martin, Tobias Moretti, Manfred Zapatka, Hanno Pöschl	Crime drama	a.k.a. Absturz
Requiem for Dominic	Robert Dornhelm	Felix Mitterer, Viktoria Schubert, August Schmölzer	Drama	Austrian-West German co-production
Die Richterin	Jörg Grünler	Inge Meysel, Klaus Schwarzkopf, Ursela Monn, Hans Peter Hallwachs, Christoph M. Ohrt	Comedy	
Rosamunde	Egon Günther	Anica Dobra, Jürgen Vogel, Richy Müller, Mario Adorf, Manfred Krug, Mathieu Carrière	Crime	
Sázka – Die Wette	Martin Walz	Beatrice Manowski, Rudolf Hrušínský, Otto Šimánek	Comedy	a.k.a. Journey's End. West German-Czechoslovak co-production
Schlaraffenland	Michael Verhoeven	Cornelia Lippert, Johannes Terne, Sigmar Solbach	Drama	
Der Schnee der Anden	Frank Guthke	Constanze Engelbrecht, Gérard Blain, Jürgen Vogel, Dieter Pfaff	Thriller	
Second Hand	Peter Stripp	Jutta Speidel, Alexander Radszun, Oliver Stritzel, Lisa Wolf	Drama	
The Second Life	Carlo Rola	Vadim Glowna, Iris Berben	Thriller	a.k.a. The Man on the Bench in the Barn a.k.a. The Hand
Silence = Death	Rosa von Praunheim		Documentary	
Solo für Georg	Jens-Peter Behrend	Helmut Baumann, Michaela Merten, Marina Krauser, Louise Martini, Hannes Jaenicke, Klaus Schwarzkopf	Comedy, Music	
Staub vor der Sonne	Petra Katharina Wagner	Erik Stappenbeck	Drama	
Step Across the Border	Werner Penzel, Nicolas Humbert	Fred Frith	Documentary, Music	Swiss-West German co-production
Der Todesking	Jörg Buttgereit	Hermann Kopp, Heinrich Ebber, Eva-Maria Kurz	Horror, Anthology	a.k.a. The Death King
Tote leben nicht allein	Nina Grosse	Myriem Roussel, Peter Sattmann, Klaus J. Behrendt	Thriller	a.k.a. La Tenaille. West German-French co-production
The Trace Leads to the Silver Lake	Günter Rätz	—N/a	Animated	
The Wall Busters Gang	Karl Heinz Lotz	Davia Dannenberg, Stefanie Stappenbeck	Family	a.k.a. Die Mauerbrockenbande
Wer zu spät kommt	Jürgen Flimm	Hans Christian Blech, Dirk Dautzenberg, Christoph Bantzer, Rolf Illig, Hans Paetsch, Friedrich W. Bauschulte	Docudrama	a.k.a. Wer zu spät kommt – Das Politbüro erlebt die deutsche Revolution
Werner – Beinhart!	Michael Schaack, Gerhard Hahn	Rötger Feldmann, Meret Becker, Ludger Pistor	Animated/live-action, Comedy	a.k.a. Werner and the Wizard of Booze
Winckelmann's Travels	Jan Schütte	Wolf-Dietrich Sprenger, Susanne Lothar, Traugott Buhre, Udo Samel	Drama	
The Wonderbeats: Kings of Beat	Claude-Oliver Rudolph	Richy Müller, Jürgen Vogel, Ralf Richter, Sabine von Maydell, Sabina Trooger	Music	
Der Zauberkasten	Peter Henning	Sarah Brückner, Hans Peter Korff, Hannelore Elsner	Science fiction, Family	
Die Zeugin	Michael Lähn	Babett Arens, Horst-Günter Marx, Christian Doermer	Crime	
Die zukünftigen Glückseligkeiten	Fred van der Kooij	Wolf-Dietrich Berg, Ben Becker, Tilo Prückner, Isolde Barth	Drama	West German-Swiss co-production

== 1991 ==
Title	Director	Cast	Genre	Notes
Der 13. Tag	Gernot Friedel	Werner Kreindl, Hans Quest, Beatrice Kessler	History	a.k.a. Am dreizehnten Tag. Austrian-German co-production
The Age of the Fish	Michael Knof	Ulrich Mühe	Drama	a.k.a. Jugend ohne Gott
Alone Among Women	Sönke Wortmann	Thomas Heinze, Jennifer Nitsch, Carin C. Tietze, Meret Becker	Comedy	
Ausgetrickst	Sigi Rothemund	Heidelinde Weis, Günther Maria Halmer, Michael Hinz	Crime	
Babylon	Ralf Huettner	Natja Brunckhorst, Dominic Raacke, Veronica Ferres	Horror	
Die Bank ist nicht geschädigt	Hartmut Griesmayr	Vadim Glowna, Horst Bollmann, Hermann Lause, Fiona Coors	Crime	
Becoming Colette	Danny Huston	Mathilda May, Klaus Maria Brandauer, Virginia Madsen	Biography	French-German-British co-production
Behind Locked Doors	Anka Schmid	Hans Madin, Helga Sloop, Sonja Deutsch, Eva-Maria Kurz	Drama	German-Swiss co-production
The Being from Earth	David Vostell	Teresa Hill, Bill Conroy	Science fiction	
Berlin – Prenzlauer Berg	Petra Tschörtner		Documentary	
Between Pankow and Zehlendorf	Horst Seemann	Corinna Harfouch, André Hennicke	Drama	
Bis Montagmorgen	Tamara Staudt	Linda Stadler, Gabi Schmalz	Drama	
The Break-In	Bettina Woernle	Aurore Clément, Laurent Le Doyen	Crime	a.k.a. The Accomplice
Bronstein's Children	Jerzy Kawalerowicz	Armin Mueller-Stahl, Rolf Hoppe, Angela Winkler, Matthias Paul	Drama	
Der Castillo-Coup	Gabi Kubach	Gregor Bloéb, Ulrike Kriener, Heinz Hoenig, Dominic Raacke, Veronica Ferres	Thriller	
Der Deal	Christian Görlitz	Dietrich Mattausch, Alexander May, Ernst Stankovski	Thriller	German-Austrian co-production
Death Came As a Friend	Nico Hofmann	Martin Benrath, Werner Kreindl, Hannelore Elsner, Marianne Hoppe, Sebastian Koch, Heino Ferch	Thriller	a.k.a. Self's Punishment
A Demon in My View	Petra Haffter	Anthony Perkins, Uwe Bohm, Sophie Ward	Thriller	a.k.a. The Man Next Door
Ehe auf Zeit	Eberhard Itzenplitz	Hartmut Schreier, Andrea Held, Evamaria Bath, Dietrich Körner	Comedy	
Einmal Arizona	Hans-Günther Bücking	Nikolaus Gröbe, Helmut Berger	Road movie	
Elfenbein	Martin Gies	Peer Augustinski, Hannelore Elsner, Gottfried John, Calvin Burke	Crime	
Elsa	Hartmut Griesmayr	Hannelore Elsner, Gogi Kharabadze	Drama	German-Georgian co-production
Ende der Unschuld	Frank Beyer	Ulrich Mühe, Rolf Hoppe, Jürgen Hentsch, Udo Samel, Hans Korte, Hanne Hiob, Hanns Zischler, Hans Peter Hallwachs	History	
Engel mit einem Flügel	Dagmar Wittmers	Arianne Borbach, Jörg Schüttauf	Drama	
Die Erbschaft	Bertram von Boxberg	Michael Degen, Walter Buschhoff, Dagmar Manzel	Drama	
Europa	Lars von Trier	Jean-Marc Barr, Barbara Sukowa, Udo Kier, Eddie Constantine	Drama	Danish-Swedish-German-French-Swiss co-production
Ex & Hopp	Andy Bausch	Mario Adorf, Maja Maranow, Désirée Nosbusch, Manfred Zapatka, Rainer Hunold, Claude-Oliver Rudolph	Drama	a.k.a. Ex und hopp – Ein böses Spiel um Liebe, Geld und Bier
Eye of the Storm	Yuri Zeltser	Craig Sheffer, Lara Flynn Boyle, Dennis Hopper	Thriller	American-German co-production
Der Fall Ö.	Rainer Simon	Matthias Habich, Jan Josef Liefers	War	
Farssmann, or On Foot up a Blind Alley	Roland Oehme	Michael Gwisdek, Peter Sodann	Comedy	a.k.a. Farssmann, or On Foot Down a Dead End a.k.a. Farßmann
Forever Young	Vivian Naefe	Barbara Rudnik, Renan Demirkan, August Zirner, Helmut Berger	Comedy	
Fremde liebe Fremde	Jürgen Bretzinger	Meret Becker, Florian Fitz, Marita Breuer, Katharina Brauren	Drama	
Die Frosch-Intrige	Hartmut Griesmayr	Beate Jensen, Alexander May, Helmut Zierl, Rainer Hunold, Wilfried Baasner	Comedy	
Die Geschichte mit Armin	Hilde Lermann	Svenja Ehrhardt, Jan Ehrenberg, Rüdiger Vogler, Evelyn Opela	Drama	a.k.a. Die Sache mit Armin
The Girl in the Lift	Herrmann Zschoche	Barbara Sommer, Rolf Lukoschek	Drama	
Go Trabi Go	Peter Timm	Wolfgang Stumph	Comedy	
The Guiltless: Zerline's Tale	Margit Saad	Christa Berndl, Axel Milberg, Leslie Malton	Drama	a.k.a. Die Erzählung der Magd Zerline
Hausmänner	Peter Timm	Peter Lohmeyer, Dani Levy, Martina Gedeck, Marita Marschall, Elisabeth Wiedemann	Comedy	
Heart in the Hand	Uwe Janson	Barbara Becker, Michael Dick, Barbara Auer	Drama	
Heldenfrühling	Michael Kehlmann	Oliver Korittke, Gottfried Neuner	War	
Hurenglück	Detlef Rönfeldt	Angelica Domröse, Hilmar Thate, Marco Hofschneider	Drama	
I Was on Mars	Dani Levy	Maria Schrader, Dani Levy	Comedy	
Ich schenk dir die Sterne	Jörg Graser	Sunnyi Melles, Gottfried John	Comedy	German-Austrian-French co-production
Ins Blaue	Radu Gabrea	Barbara Rudnik, Charlotte Véry, Anne-Marie Besse	Comedy	German-French co-production
Jag Mandir	Werner Herzog		Documentary	
Josef und Maria	Vera Loebner	Reimar Johannes Baur, Elsa Grube-Deister	Comedy	
The Kaltenbach Papers	Rainer Erler	Mario Adorf, Ulrich Tukur, Gudrun Landgrebe, Simona Cavallari	Thriller	a.k.a. A Fatal Assignment
Karniggels	Detlev Buck	Bernd Michael Lade, Ingo Naujoks, Julia Jäger	Comedy	a.k.a. Little Rabbits
Keep on Running	Holm Dressler	Michelle Phillips, Timothy Peach, Holger Handtke, Oliver Korittke	Comedy	
Killer	Gert Steinheimer	Karin Schröder, Ulrike Kriener, Michael Mendl, Dietmar Schönherr	Crime comedy	
Kollege Otto – Die Coop-Affäre	Heinrich Breloer	Rainer Hunold, Gert Haucke, Hermann Lause, Hannelore Hoger	Docudrama	a.k.a. Workmate Otto
Lebewohl, Fremde	Tevfik Başer	Grażyna Szapołowska, Müşfik Kenter	Drama	a.k.a. Farewell, Stranger. Screened at the 1991 Cannes Film Festival
Leo und Charlotte	Kaspar Heidelbach	Klaus J. Behrendt, Katja Flint, Rolf Becker, Karina Marmann, Dietmar Bär, Leonard Lansink, Jürgen Schornagel, Martina Gedeck, Christoph M. Ohrt	Drama	
Life for Life: Maximilian Kolbe	Krzysztof Zanussi	Christoph Waltz, Edward Zentara	War, Biography	Polish-German co-production
Love at First Sight	Rudolf Thome	Geno Lechner, Julian Benedikt, Hans-Michael Rehberg, Vera Tschechowa	Comedy	
Malina	Werner Schroeter	Isabelle Huppert, Mathieu Carrière	Drama	German-Austrian co-production. Entered into the 1991 Cannes Film Festival
Manta – Der Film	Peter Timm	Sebastian Rudolph, Nadeshda Brennicke	Comedy	
Manta, Manta	Wolfgang Büld	Til Schweiger, Tina Ruland, Michael Kessler	Action comedy	a.k.a. Racin' in the Streets
Marx & Coca Cola	Hartmut Griesmayr	Helmut Zierl, Birge Schade	Comedy	a.k.a. Marx and Coca Cola
Mein Bruder, der Clown	Hans Werner	Rolf Hoppe, Peter Bongartz	Drama	
Mocca für den Tiger	Thomas Nennstiel	Max Tidof, Crescentia Dünßer	Comedy	
Moscow-Petushki	Jens Carl Ehlers	Martin Wuttke, Branko Samarovski, Barbara Lass, Henryk Bista	Drama	a.k.a. Moskau–Petuschki
Murderous Decisions	Oliver Hirschbiegel	Nils Tavernier, Mapi Galán, Michael Byrne, Rolf Zacher, Brigitte Mira, Małgorzata Gebel, Paulus Manker, Nina Franoszek	Thriller	
My Daughter Belongs to Me	Vivian Naefe	Barbara Auer, Georges Corraface, Nicole Heesters	Drama	a.k.a. My Daughter Is Mine
Nach Erzleben	Stefan Dähnert	Beatrice Manowski	Drama	
Nekromantik 2	Jörg Buttgereit	Monika M., Mark Reeder	Horror	
No Mention of Violence	Theodor Kotulla	Katja Riemann, Heiner Lauterbach, Peter Sattmann	Drama	a.k.a. Von Gewalt keine Rede
The Odd Couple	Michael Günther	Harald Juhnke, Eddi Arent	Comedy	a.k.a. Ein seltsames Paar
Ostermontag	Heiko Fipper	Nicole Dietrich, Stephan Fippe, Heiko Fipper	Horror	
Ostkreuz	Michael Klier	Laura Tonke, Suzanne von Borsody, Mirosław Baka	Drama	
Pappa Ante Portas	Loriot	Loriot, Evelyn Hamann	Comedy	
The Party: Nature Morte	Cynthia Beatt	Tilda Swinton, Féodor Atkine	Drama	
Pizza Colonia	Klaus Emmerich	Mario Adorf, Ilaria Occhini, Willy Millowitsch, Riccardo Cucciolla	Comedy	
Playing with Fire	Dagmar Damek	Birgit Doll, August Zirner, Hans Peter Hallwachs	Drama	a.k.a. Spiel mit dem Feuer a.k.a. L'Adultera
Pray for Ricki Forster	Wolf Gremm	Götz Schubert, Bettina Kupfer, Brigitte Mira, Peter Fitz, Harald Leipnitz, Hans Clarin, Robert Atzorn	Thriller	a.k.a. Gesucht wird Ricki Forster
Rama dama	Joseph Vilsmaier	Dana Vávrová, Werner Stocker	Drama	
Der Rest, der bleibt	Bodo Fürneisen	Annekathrin Bürger, Alexander Höchst	Drama	
Rothenbaumchaussee	Dietrich Haugk	Jochen Horst, Marie-Charlott Schüler, Thomas Kretschmann, Christine Wodetzky, Rolf Becker, Wolfgang Völz, Klaus Höhne, Karl Lieffen	Drama	
Saint Peter's Snow	Peter Patzak	Werner Stocker, Iris Berben, Günter Mack, Hartmut Becker	Mystery	German-Austrian co-production
Salmonberries	Percy Adlon	k.d. lang, Rosel Zech, Oscar Kawagley, Chuck Connors	Drama	
Scheidung à la carte	Konrad Sabrautzky	Vadim Glowna, Elisabeth Trissenaar, Heino Ferch, Karin Baal	Comedy	
Die schönste Liebesgeschichte des Jahrhunderts	Hartmut Schoen	Elfriede Kuzmany, Manfred Steffen, Annette Uhlen	Drama	
Scream of Stone	Werner Herzog	Donald Sutherland, Vittorio Mezzogiorno, Mathilda May, Brad Dourif	Adventure	German-French-Canadian co-production
The Serbian Girl	Peter Sehr	Mirjana Joković, Ben Becker	Drama	German-Yugoslavian co-production
The Seventh Brother	Jenő Koltai, Tibor Hernádi	—N/a	Animated fantasy-comedy-drama	Hungarian-German-American co-production
Silent Shadow	Sherry Hormann	Ann-Gisel Glass, Stefano Dionisi, Thomas Heinze	Drama	a.k.a. Leise Schatten
So ein Theater	Wolfgang Luderer	Robert Atzorn, Harald Leipnitz	Comedy	
Die Spielerin	Manfred Grunert	Marie-Charlott Schüler, Max Tidof	Drama	
Stein	Egon Günther	Rolf Ludwig	Drama	
Stein und Bein	Wolf Dietrich	Gustl Bayrhammer, Heinz Schubert	Comedy	
Success	Franz Seitz	Bruno Ganz, Bernhard Wicki, Franziska Walser, Peter Simonischek, Martin Benrath, Mathieu Carrière, Jutta Speidel, Ernst Jacobi	Drama	Entered into the 41st Berlin International Film Festival
Superstau	Manfred Stelzer	Ottfried Fischer, Ralf Richter, Jan Fedder	Comedy	
Suspicion	Frank Beyer	Christiane Heinrich, Nikolaus Gröbe, Michael Gwisdek, Christine Schorn	Drama	
The Tango Player	Roland Gräf	Michael Gwisdek, Corinna Harfouch	Drama	Entered into the 41st Berlin International Film Festival
Tanz auf der Kippe	Jürgen Brauer	Frank Stieren, Dagmar Manzel, Winfried Glatzeder	Drama	a.k.a. Dancing at the Dump
The Terrible Threesome	Hermine Huntgeburth	Barbara Auer, Karin Baal, Ruth Hellberg, Edgar Selge	Crime comedy	a.k.a. Im Kreise der Lieben
Te Rua	Barry Barclay	Wi Kuki Kaa, Günter Meisner, Nissie Herewini	Drama	NZ-German co-production
Tod auf Bali	Jörg Grünler	Judy Winter, Katja Flint, Wolfram Berger, Wilfried Baasner, Pinkas Braun, Christine Hakim	Drama	
Top Prize: Mauritius	Vivian Naefe	August Zirner, Helen Schneider, Friedrich von Thun, Nicole Heesters	Crime comedy	a.k.a. Mauritius-Los
Tote Briefe	Karl Fruchtmann	Dieter Kirchlechner, Angelica Domröse, Winfried Glatzeder, Tina Engel, Ernst Jacobi	Drama	
Tote leben länger	Ines Anna Krämer	Helmut Zierl, Claudia Brunnert, Winfried Glatzeder, Helga Feddersen	Crime	a.k.a. Wiedergänger
Trabbi Goes to Hollywood	Jon Turteltaub	Thomas Gottschalk, Billy Dee Williams, George Kennedy, Dom DeLuise	Comedy	American-German co-production
Transit	René Allio	Sebastian Koch, Claudia Messner, Rüdiger Vogler, Dominique Horwitz	Drama, War	French-German co-production
Trutz	Hans-Werner Honert	Bernd Michael Lade, Peter Sodann	Drama	
Unser Haus	Hartmut Griesmayr	Hans Peter Korff, Ursela Monn, Peter Reusse	Drama	
Unter Kollegen	Claus-Michael Rohne	Ulrike Folkerts, Sissi Perlinger, Michael Habeck, Jochen Nickel	Drama	
Until the End of the World	Wim Wenders	Solveig Dommartin, William Hurt, Sam Neill, Max von Sydow, Jeanne Moreau	Science fiction	German-French-Australian co-production
Verurteilt: Anna Leschek	Bernd Schadewald	Ulrike Kriener, Ulrich Pleitgen	Crime drama	
Von wegen	Christoph Doering	Bernd Raucamp, Alexander von Oertzen	Drama	
Voyager	Volker Schlöndorff	Sam Shepard, Julie Delpy, Barbara Sukowa	Drama	a.k.a. Homo Faber. German-French-Greece co-production
Walerjan Wrobel's Homesickness	Rolf Schübel	Artur Pontek	Drama, War	Entered into the 17th Moscow International Film Festival
Wheels and Deals	Michael Hammon	Sello Maake Ka-Ncube	Crime drama	a.k.a. Wheels & Deals. German-South African co-production
Who's Afraid of Red, Yellow and Blue	Heiko Schier	Max Tidof, Stephanie Philipp, Heino Ferch	Comedy	
Wildfire	Jo Baier	Anica Dobra	Biography	
Willkommen im Paradies	Erwin Keusch	Peter Sattmann, Hellena Büttner, Gunter Schoß, Heidrun Welskop	Comedy	
Wilma wohnt weit weg	Dirk Schäfer	Marie Schmitz	Drama	a.k.a. Wilma Lives Far Away
Wonder Years	Arend Agthe	Silvia Lang, Gudrun Landgrebe	Drama	
The Year of the Black Butterflies	Alexandra von Grote	Gabriele Osburg, Mark McGann, Ulrich Matschoss, Corny Collins, Hans Peter Hallwachs	Drama, War	a.k.a. Reise ohne Wiederkehr
Zockerexpreß	Klaus Lemke	Huub Stapel, Hanno Pöschl, Christine Zierl, Ivan Desny	Crime	a.k.a. Zocker Express. (Shot in 1988)

== 1992 ==
Title	Director	Cast	Genre	Notes
5 Rooms, Kitchen, Bathroom	Rolf Silber	Christoph Waltz, Anica Dobra	Comedy	
Abgetrieben	Norbert Kückelmann	Hanns Zischler, Dominic Raacke, Jörg Hube, Edgar Selge, Saskia Vester, Christine Neubauer	Drama	
The Absence	Peter Handke	Bruno Ganz, Jeanne Moreau	Drama	French-German-Spanish co-production
Der absurde Mord	Rainer Bär	Peter Sattmann, Nina Hoger, Rolf Hoppe	Mystery	
Das alte Lied	Ula Stöckl	Lotte Meyer	Drama	a.k.a. The Old Song
Andere Umstände	Bettina Woernle	Katja Riemann, Hannes Jaenicke, Rainer Grenkowitz, Alexander Hauff	Comedy	
Andy	Ralph Bohn	Oliver Masucci, Anna Thalbach	Drama	
Die Angst wird bleiben	Diethard Klante	Heinz Hoenig, Constanze Engelbrecht, Christoph Waltz, Johanna Klante, Horst-Günter Marx	Drama	
Antigone	Straub–Huillet	Astrid Ofner	Drama	a.k.a. Die Antigone des Sophokles nach der Hölderlinschen Übertragung für die Bühne bearbeitet von Brecht. German-French co-production
Apple Trees	Helma Sanders-Brahms	Johanna Schall, Thomas Büchel, Udo Kroschwald	Drama	Screened at the 1992 Cannes Film Festival
Begräbnis einer Gräfin	Heiner Carow	Hans Christian Blech	Comedy	
Blame It on the Bossa Nova	Bernd Schadewald	Muriel Baumeister, Jürgen Vogel, Benno Fürmann, Fiona Coors	Drama	
The Blue Hour	Marcel Gisler	Andreas Herder, Dina Leipzig	Gay drama	
Border Frenzy	Niklaus Schilling	Tilo Prückner, Christiane Paul	Comedy	a.k.a. Deutschfieber
The Burning Moon	Olaf Ittenbach	Olaf Ittenbach	Horror	
Chéri, mein Mann kommt!	Hans-Jürgen Tögel	Herbert Herrmann, Simone Rethel, Loni von Friedl, Sky du Mont, Angelika Milster, Claudine Wilde, Klaus Wildbolz	Comedy	a.k.a. Hotel Mimosa a.k.a. Pension complète
Child's Play	Wolfgang Becker	Jonas Kipp, Burghart Klaußner	Crime drama	
Cosimas Lexikon	Peter Kahane	Iris Berben, Ralf Richter, Karin Baal, Sebastian Koch, Dieter Landuris	Comedy	
The Democratic Terrorist	Pelle Berglund	Stellan Skarsgård, Katja Flint, Kjell Bergqvist, Heikko Deutschmann, Susanne Lothar, Burkhard Driest, Ulrich Tukur, Rolf Hoppe, Claudia Demarmels, Günther Maria Halmer, Despina Pajanou	Thriller	a.k.a. Carl Hamilton: The Democratic Terrorist. Swedish-German co-production
Dornberger	Franz Peter Wirth	Peter Bongartz, Iris Berben, Volkert Kraeft	Drama	
Dügün – Die Heirat	İsmet Elçi	Oguz Tunç, Asli Altan, Halil Ergün, Claudine Wilde	Drama	a.k.a. Dügün: The Wedding
Dunkle Schatten der Angst	Konstantin Schmidt	Nur Sürer, Tuncel Kurtiz	Drama	a.k.a. Schatten der Angst
Eines Tages irgendwann	Vadim Glowna	Anne Kasprik, Kim Kübler	Comedy	
Der Erdnussmann	Dietmar Klein	Hans-Joachim Grubel, Franziska Troegner, Ulrike Krumbiegel	Comedy	a.k.a. Shaky, the Peanut Man
Falsche Zahlen	Hartmut Griesmayr	Robert Atzorn, Beate Jensen, Martin Semmelrogge	Crime	
Frohes Fest, Lucie!	Roland Suso Richter	Thomas Heinze, Annette Uhlen, Gertraud Jesserer, Heinz Hoenig	Crime	
Geboren 1999	Kai Wessel	Sebastian Rudolph, Julia Brendler, Renan Demirkan, Peter Sattmann, Marita Breuer, Ulrich Matschoss, Heinz Schubert	Science fiction	
Geheimakte Lenz	Hartmut Griesmayr	Horst Bollmann, Hans Peter Hallwachs	Crime comedy	
Gerichtstag	Eberhard Itzenplitz	Dieter Kirchlechner, Hans Peter Hallwachs, Donata Höffer, Hans Peter Korff	Drama	
Glück 1	Lih Janowitz	Natalia Wörner, Ralph Herforth	Science fiction	
Das große Fest	Frank Beyer	Hans Christian Blech, Rolf Hoppe, Iris Berben, Michael Gwisdek	Drama	
Gudrun	Hans W. Geißendörfer	Kerstin Gmelch	Drama	Won an Honourable Mention at Berlin
Guinevere	Ingemo Engström	Amanda Ooms	Drama	
Hamburger Gift	Horst Königstein	Al Corley, Rita Tushingham, Josef Bierbichler, Christoph Bantzer	Docudrama	
Happy Birthday, Turk!	Doris Dörrie	Hansa Czypionka, Özay Fecht, Meret Becker, Şiir Eloğlu, Lambert Hamel, Doris Kunstmann	Crime	
Die Heiratsschwindlerin	Richard Blank	Adelheid Arndt	Comedy	
Herzsprung	Helke Misselwitz	Nino Sandow, Claudia Geisler-Bading, Günter Lamprecht, Eva-Maria Hagen, Ben Becker	Drama	
The Hill of Lies	Rainer Wolffhardt	Susanne Lüning, Martina Gedeck, Silvan-Pierre Leirich, Frank Schröder	Drama	a.k.a. Endstation Harembar a.k.a. Ein ernstes Leben
I Am My Own Woman	Rosa von Praunheim	Charlotte von Mahlsdorf	Documentary	
Im Dunstkreis	Berthold Mittermayr	Günther Maria Halmer, Fritz Karl, Silvia Reize, Erwin Leder	Crime	Austrian-German co-production
Im Kreis der Iris	Peter Patzak	Philippe Léotard, Marthe Keller	Drama	Austrian-German co-production
Jana and Jan	Helmut Dziuba	Kristin Scheffer, René Guß, Julia Brendler, Peter Sodann	Drama	a.k.a. Jana & Jan
Judith	Konrad Sabrautzky	Barbara Auer, Viorel Iliescu, Klaus J. Behrendt	Drama	
Knight Moves	Carl Schenkel	Christopher Lambert, Diane Lane	Thriller	German-American co-production
König & Consorten	Pete Ariel	Heinz Reincke, Suzanne von Borsody, Judy Winter	Drama	a.k.a. König und Consorten
La Paloma fliegt nicht mehr	Tom Toelle	Hans Christian Blech, Wolfgang Reichmann, Klaus Schwarzkopf, Hans Paetsch	Drama	
Landschaft mit Dornen	Bernd Böhlich	Ben Becker, Sven Martinek, Anja Kling	Crime	
Langer Gang	Yılmaz Arslan	Nina Kunzendorf	Drama	
Langer Samstag	Hanns Christian Müller	Gisela Schneeberger, Campino, Dieter Pfaff, Ottfried Fischer	Comedy	
The Last U-Boat	Frank Beyer	Ulrich Mühe, Ulrich Tukur, Matthias Habich, Kaoru Kobayashi, Goro Ohashi, Barry Bostwick	War	
Lenz	Egon Günther	Jörg Schüttauf, Christian Kuchenbuch, Anja Kling	Biography	a.k.a. Lenz. Ich aber werde dunkel sein
Lessons of Darkness	Werner Herzog		Documentary	
Liebesreise	Sylvia Hoffman	Judith Rosmair, Dietrich Mattausch, Rufus, Gila von Weitershausen, Denis Laustriat, Pierre Vernier, Judy Campbell	Crime	
The Little Punker	Michael Schaack	—N/a	Animated	a.k.a. The Little Punk
Little Sharks	Sönke Wortmann	Jürgen Vogel, Kai Wiesinger, Meret Becker, Gedeon Burkhard, Armin Rohde	Comedy	
Long Conversation with a Bird	Krzysztof Zanussi	Robert Powell, Brigitte Fossey, Daniel Olbrychski, Hannelore Elsner, Rüdiger Vogler	Drama	a.k.a. The Long Conversation with the Bird
The Magic Voyage	Michael Schoemann	—N/a	Animated	
Mau Mau	Uwe Schrader	Marlen Diekhoff, Catrin Striebeck, Myriam Mézières, Henryk Bista	Drama	
The Mistake	Heiner Carow	Angelica Domröse, Gottfried John	Drama	a.k.a. Die Verfehlung
Mit dem Herzen einer Mutter	Franz Josef Gottlieb	Sabine Kaack, Marina Berti, Raf Vallone	Drama	
Mit tödlicher Sicherheit	Andy Bausch	Matthew Burton, Hark Bohm, Gudrun Landgrebe, Otto Sander, Richy Müller, Claude-Oliver Rudolph	Thriller	a.k.a. Manipulations. German-French co-production
Moebius	Matti Geschonneck	Jörg Gudzuhn, Corinna Kirchhoff, Günter Lamprecht, Diether Krebs, Hans Peter Korff	Science fiction	a.k.a. A Subway Named Möbius
Mutter mit 16	Horst Kummeth	Susanna Wellenbrink, Marita Marschall, Marco Hofschneider	Drama	a.k.a. Mutter mit Sechzehn
Mutter und Söhne	Claus Peter Witt	Heidi Kabel, Volkert Kraeft, Angelika Milster, Martina Gedeck	Comedy	
The Mystery of the Amber Room	Roland Gräf	Corinna Harfouch, Uwe Kockisch, Ulrich Tukur, Kurt Böwe, Michael Gwisdek	Thriller	
Neptun und Isolde	Joachim Roering	Ernst Schröder, Renate Winkler, Silvan-Pierre Leirich, Vera Tschechowa	Comedy	
Never Sleep Again	Pia Frankenberg	Lisa Kreuzer, Gabi Herz, Christiane Carstens, Ernst Stötzner, Leonard Lansink	Comedy	a.k.a. Nie wieder schlafen
New Year's Eve Concert 1992: Richard Strauss Gala	Barrie Gavin	Claudio Abbado, Berlin Philharmonic	Concert	
Night on Fire	Markus Fischer	Bruno Ganz, Barbara Auer, Rolf Hoppe, Suzanne von Borsody, Dietmar Schönherr, Maren Kroymann	Crime	a.k.a. Brandnacht. German-Swiss co-production
North Curve	Adolf Winkelmann	Renate Krößner, Jochen Nickel, Walter Kreye, Hermann Lause, Michael Brandner, Katharina Abt, Wolf-Dietrich Berg, Stefan Jürgens	Comedy, Sport	a.k.a. Saturday Action
The Parrot	Ralf Huettner	Harald Juhnke	Comedy	
Eine phantastische Nacht	Peter Behle	Heidelinde Weis, Heiner Lauterbach	Comedy	a.k.a. A Community of Two
Princess Alexandra	Denis Amar	Anne Roussel, Matthias Habich, Rüdiger Vogler, Andrea Occhipinti, Anna Kanakis, Jean-Claude Dreyfus	Drama	French-German-Italian co-production
Probefahrt ins Paradies	Douglas Wolfsperger	Barbara Auer, Christiane Hörbiger, Axel Milberg, Mathias Gnädinger	Comedy	German-Swiss co-production
Ring of the Musketeers	John Paragon	David Hasselhoff, Thomas Gottschalk, Cheech Marin, Alison Doody, John Rhys-Davies, Corbin Bernsen	Action comedy	
Die Ringe des Saturn	Michael Kehlmann	Franz Morak, Hans Christian Blech, Riccardo Cucciolla, Paul Hubschmid, Gabriele Ferzetti, Mathieu Carrière	Thriller	German-Austrian-Swiss co-production
Rising to the Bait	Vadim Glowna	Elsa Grube-Deister, Rolf Zacher	Comedy	a.k.a. Der Brocken
Roses for Africa	Sohrab Shahid-Saless	Silvan-Pierre Leirich	Drama	
Salt on Our Skin	Andrew Birkin	Greta Scacchi, Vincent D'Onofrio	Drama	a.k.a. Desire. German-French-Canadian co-production
Scheusal	Bodo Fürneisen	Christine Schorn, Jutta Wachowiak, Walfriede Schmitt, Ursula Werner, Werner Dissel	Drama	
Schlafende Hunde	Max Färberböck	Sabine Postel, Peter Lohmeyer	Comedy	
Schtonk!	Helmut Dietl	Götz George, Uwe Ochsenknecht, Harald Juhnke, Christiane Hörbiger, Veronica Ferres, Martin Benrath	Comedy	1992 Academy Award Nominee for Best Foreign Film; Satire about the Hitler Diaries hoax
Schuldlos schuldig	Rainer Wolffhardt	Marita Marschall, Michael Roll, Philipp Moog, Horst Kummeth	Crime	
Die schwache Stunde	Danielle Giuliani	Robert Hunger-Bühler	Comedy	Swiss-German co-production
The Serpentine Dancer	Helmut Herbst	Karina Fallenstein, Ben Becker, Eva Mattes, Otto Sander, Wolf-Dietrich Sprenger	Drama	a.k.a. Die Serpentintänzerin. German-Hungarian co-production
Shadow Boxer	Lars Becker	Diego Wallraff, Christian Redl	Crime	
Sie und Er	Frank Beyer	Senta Berger, Reimar Johannes Baur	Drama	
Silent Country	Andreas Dresen	Thorsten Merten, Jeannette Arndt, Kurt Böwe	Drama	
Struppi & Wolf	Andy Bausch	Lena Stolze, Michael Degen, Richy Müller, Elisabeth Volkmann	Comedy	a.k.a. Struppi und Wolf
The Summer Album	Kai Wessel	Eva Mattes, Hanna Mattes	Drama	
Tandem	Bernhard Stephan	Hannelore Hoger, Vadim Glowna, Winfried Glatzeder	Comedy	
Terror 2000: Germany Out of Control	Christoph Schlingensief	Udo Kier, Margit Carstensen, Peter Kern, Alfred Edel	Drama	a.k.a. Terror 2000 – Intensivstation Deutschland
Terror Stalks the Class Reunion	Clive Donner	Kate Nelligan, Jennifer Beals, Geraint Wyn Davies, Werner Stocker, Madeleine Robinson, Manfred Lehmann	Thriller	Canadian-French-German co-production
The Terrorists!	Philip Gröning	Stephanie Philipp, Michael Schech, David Baalcke	Thriller	
Thea und Nat	Nina Grosse	Corinna Harfouch, Helmut Berger	Drama	
The Tigress	Karin Howard	Valentina Vargas, James Remar, George Peppard, Hannes Jaenicke, Ferdy Mayne	Drama	
Tod der Engel	Rainer Wolffhardt	Marita Marschall, Wolfram Berger	Crime	
Der Tod zu Basel	Urs Odermatt	Günter Lamprecht, Dietmar Schönherr	Mystery	Swiss-German co-production
The True Story About Men and Women	Robert van Ackeren	Sonja Kirchberger, Andréa Ferréol, Thomas Heinze	Comedy	
Die ungewisse Lage des Paradieses	Franziska Buch	Daniela Schleicher	Comedy	a.k.a. In Search of Paradise
Der Unschuldsengel	Oliver Storz, Julian Pölsler	Helmut Fischer, Iris Berben, Hans Clarin, Rita Russek, Karl-Heinz Vosgerau, Krista Stadler	Comedy	
Der unsichtbare Freund	Ray Müller	Josef Bierbichler	Science fiction	
Verflixte Leidenschaft	Carlo Rola	Iris Berben, Vadim Glowna, Peter Bongartz, Gunter Berger, Hans-Michael Rehberg	Anthology	
Verlorene Landschaft	Andreas Kleinert	Roland Schäfer, Sylvester Groth	Drama	
Videograms of a Revolution	Harun Farocki, Andrei Ujică		Documentary	
Violent Shit II: Mother Hold My Hand	Andreas Schnaas	Andreas Schnaas	Horror	
Widerspenstige Viktoria	Eberhard Itzenplitz	Uschi Glas, Muriel Baumeister, Lambert Hamel	Drama	
With Murder in Mind	Rainer Bär	Flavio Bucci, Peter Sattmann, Ute Willing, Dieter Kirchlechner, Dirk Dautzenberg, Elisabeth Wiedemann, Ursula Karven	Thriller	a.k.a. Einer stirbt bestimmt
Zärtliche Erpresserin	Beat Lottaz	Anna Thalbach, August Zirner	Drama	German-Swiss co-production

== 1993 ==
Title	Director	Cast	Genre	Notes
Die 1003. Nacht	Richard Blank	Gabi Herz, Axel Milberg	Comedy	
Achtundzwanzichtausend Wünsche	Dirk Schäfer	Marie Schmitz	Drama	a.k.a. Achtundzwanzigtausend Wünsche a.k.a. 28000 Wünsche
Adamski	Jens Becker	Steffen Scheumann, Nadja Engel	Comedy	
Apfel im Moor	Marcus Scholz	Anke Sevenich, Horst-Günter Marx, Michael Gahr	Thriller	
At the Edge of Paradise	Otto Retzer	George Hamilton, Morgan Fairchild, Brent Huff	Drama	
Außerirdische	Florian Gärtner	Jasper Brandis, Florian Gärtner, Peter Werner	Drama	a.k.a. Extraterrestrial a.k.a. Aliens
Barmherzige Schwestern	Annelie Runge	Anne Kasprik, Nina Petri, Martina Gedeck	Black comedy	
Bells from the Deep	Werner Herzog		Documentary	
Benefit of the Doubt	Jonathan Heap	Donald Sutherland, Amy Irving	Thriller	American-German co-production
Der Betrogene	Heinz Schirk	Günter Strack, Corinne Touzet, Robert Atzorn, Doris Kunstmann	Thriller	
Body of Evidence	Uli Edel	Madonna, Willem Dafoe, Joe Mantegna, Anne Archer, Julianne Moore, Jürgen Prochnow	Thriller	German-American co-production
Die Bombe tickt	Thorsten Näter	Julia Grimpe, Frank Stieren, Ulrich Matschoss	Crime	
Bommels Billigflüge	Claus-Michael Rohne	Anke Sevenich, Dominique Horwitz, Rüdiger Vogler, Tina Ruland, Rosemarie Fendel	Comedy	
Boomtown	Christoph Schrewe	Steffen Wink, Claudine Wilde, Helmut Berger, Isolde Barth, Horst-Günter Marx	Drama	a.k.a. Boom Town
Böses Blut	Dagmar Damek	Désirée Nosbusch, Marion Kracht, Mathieu Carrière, Rainer Hunold, Nadja Tiller	Drama	
Brigitta	Dagmar Knöpfel	Éva Igó, Tamás Jordán, Carl Achleitner, Zoltán Gera, Róbert Koltai	Drama	German-Hungarian co-production
Christinas Seitensprung	Oliver Storz	Iris Berben, Jutta Speidel, Michael Degen, Roberto Bisacco, Gerd Böckmann, Bruno Eyron	Comedy	
Cliffs of the Death	Wolf Gremm	Hannelore Elsner, Heinz Hoenig, Michaela May, Harald Leipnitz	Thriller	a.k.a. The Spider-Orchid
Dance of Death	Vivian Naefe	Lena Stolze, Walter Kreye, Lavinia Wilson	Thriller	a.k.a. Todesreigen
Dann eben mit Gewalt	Rainer Kaufmann	Jürgen Vogel, Thomas Heinze, Jasmin Tabatabai, Regula Grauwiller	Drama	a.k.a. Violence: The Last Resort
The Day of the Storm	Helmut Förnbacher	Sophie von Kessel, Michael Lesch, Rolf Hoppe, Horst-Günter Marx, Heidelinde Weis	Drama	a.k.a. Stürmische Begegnung
Deadly Maria	Tom Tykwer	Nina Petri, Joachim Król, Josef Bierbichler	Thriller	
Doberstein	Charly Weller	André Hennicke, Hannelore Elsner	Crime	
Das Double	Ralf Huettner	Harald Juhnke, Christine Kaufmann, Udo Kier	Comedy	
Duett	Xaver Schwarzenberger	Agnes Baltsa, Otto Schenk, Karlheinz Hackl	Crime	Austrian-German co-production
Durst	Martin Weinhart	Jürgen Vogel, Nicolette Krebitz, André Eisermann	Drama	
Ebbie's Bluff	Claude-Oliver Rudolph	Heiner Lauterbach, Til Schweiger, Sabine von Maydell, Manfred Zapatka, Helge Schneider, Meret Becker	Comedy, Sport	
Einer zahlt immer	Max Färberböck	Heinz Hoenig, Dagmar Manzel, Barbara Focke	Comedy	
Engel ohne Flügel	Maria Theresia Wagner	Günter Lamprecht, Julia Brendler, Thomas Kretschmann	Drama	
Familienehre	Eberhard Itzenplitz	Nicole Heesters, Klausjürgen Wussow	Drama	
Faraway, So Close!	Wim Wenders	Otto Sander, Bruno Ganz, Nastassja Kinski, Horst Buchholz, Heinz Rühmann, Peter Falk	Fantasy drama	1993 Golden Globe Nominee for Best Foreign Film; 1993 Grand Prix Winner at Cannes
Frankie, Jonny & die anderen	Hans-Erich Viet	Detlef Kuper, Paul Herwig, Claudia Maria Meyer	Comedy	a.k.a. Frankie, Jonny und die anderen
Gefährliche Verbindung	Uwe Janson	Heino Ferch, Jennifer Nitsch, Günter Lamprecht	Drama	
Das Geheimnis	Michael Schottenberg	Hans Peter Hallwachs, Martin Brambach, Bernhard Wicki	Crime	a.k.a. The Secret. Austrian-German co-production
Goldstaub	Ottokar Runze	Corinna Harfouch, Götz Schubert, Dietrich Körner, Gudrun Landgrebe	Drama	
Grüß Gott, Genosse	Manfred Stelzer	Jürgen Schmidt, Renate Krößner, Georg Marischka, Irm Hermann	Comedy	
Das Haus im Ginster	Gottfried Junker	Anikó Vargová, Jürgen Heinrich, Sabine Sinjen	Drama	a.k.a. The House in the Macchia
Heiß-Kalt	Markus Fischer	Barbara Magdalena Ahren, Urs Remond	Thriller	a.k.a. Kaltes Fieber. Swiss-German co-production
Hochwürden erbt das Paradies	Otto Retzer	Hans Clarin, Jochen Busse, Julia Biedermann, Dagmar Koller	Comedy	
Hörigkeit des Herzens	Carlo Rola	Maren Schumacher, Michael Roll, Gila von Weitershausen, Klausjürgen Wussow	Drama	a.k.a. Die Skrupellosen
The House of the Spirits	Bille August	Meryl Streep, Glenn Close, Jeremy Irons, Winona Ryder, Antonio Banderas, Vanessa Redgrave, Armin Mueller-Stahl, Jan Niklas, Maria Conchita Alonso	Drama	German-Danish-Portuguese co-production
Hunt for the Blue Diamond	Otto Retzer	Barry Newman, Ernest Borgnine, Laura Johnson, Pierre Brice, Sonja Kirchberger, Brent Huff, Harald Leipnitz	Adventure	
Im Himmel hört dich niemand weinen	Carlo Rola	Iris Berben, Vadim Glowna	Drama	
Im Teufelskreis	Hartmut Griesmayr	Gunter Berger, Hannelore Elsner, Fiona Coors, Nina Hoger, Tilo Prückner, Hans Peter Hallwachs, Sky du Mont, Max Tidof	Thriller	a.k.a. Vicious Circle
Immer Ärger mit Nicole	Frank Strecker	Hans Clarin, Dagmar Koller, Nicole Weber, Hansi Kraus, Ottfried Fischer, Harald Leipnitz, Christine Schuberth	Comedy	
Inge, April und Mai	Wolfgang Kohlhaase, Gabriele Denecke	Niels Bruno Schmidt, Nadine Böttcher, Otto Sander, Corinna Harfouch, Silke Matthias	War	a.k.a. Inge, April and May
The Innocent	John Schlesinger	Anthony Hopkins, Isabella Rossellini, Campbell Scott	Drama	American-German co-production
Jeans und rote Rosen	Thomas Nikel	Claudia Demarmels, Christian Wolff	Comedy	
Just a Matter of Duty	Thomas Mitscherlich	Katharina Thalbach	Drama, War	a.k.a. The Denunciation a.k.a. Die Denunziantin. Entered into the 43rd Berlin International Film Festival
Justice	Hans W. Geißendörfer	Maximilian Schell, Thomas Heinze, Anna Thalbach, Hark Bohm, Suzanne von Borsody, Ulrike Kriener	Drama	a.k.a. The Execution of Justice. German-Swiss co-production
Kahlschlag	Hanno Brühl	Björn Jung	Drama	
Kaspar Hauser	Peter Sehr	André Eisermann, Uwe Ochsenknecht, Katharina Thalbach	Drama	
Kein Pardon	Hape Kerkeling, Angelo Colagrossi	Hape Kerkeling, Heinz Schenk, Kurt Weinzierl, Elisabeth Volkmann, Dirk Dautzenberg, Maren Kroymann	Comedy	
A King for Burning	Tom Toelle	Christoph Waltz, Mario Adorf	Historical drama	a.k.a. König der letzten Tage
Der Kleine und der alte Mann	Peter Welz	Florian Lukas, Peter Prager, Sylvia Haider, Stefanie Stappenbeck	Drama	
Krücke	Jörg Grünler	Heinz Hoenig, Martina Gedeck, Götz Behrendt	Drama	
Leporella	Dagmar Damek	Jessica Kosmalla, Max Tidof, Gila von Weitershausen	Drama	
Das letzte Siegel	Stefan Dähnert	Josef Ostendorf	Comedy	a.k.a. The Last Seal
The Long Silence	Margarethe von Trotta	Carla Gravina, Jacques Perrin, Alida Valli	Drama	Italian-French-German co-production
The Lucona Affair	Jack Gold	David Suchet, Jürgen Prochnow, Franco Nero, Dominique Sanda	Thriller	German-Austrian co-production
Ludwig 1881	Donatello Dubini, Fosco Dubini	Helmut Berger, Max Tidof, Nina Hoger	Biography	Swiss-German co-production
Madame Bäurin	Franz Xaver Bogner	Julia Stemberger, Francis Fulton-Smith, Hanna Schygulla, Franz Xaver Kroetz	Comedy	
Magic Müller	Thomas Bohn	Ingo Naujoks, Maria Schrader	Comedy, Science fiction	
Making Up!	Katja von Garnier	Katja Riemann, Nina Kronjäger, Max Tidof, Gedeon Burkhard	Comedy	a.k.a. Abgeschminkt!
A Man for My Wife	Hartmut Griesmayr	Robert Atzorn, Iris Berben, Jennifer Nitsch	Comedy	
Mandelküsschen	Bernhard Stephan	Vadim Glowna, Constanze Engelbrecht, Tilo Prückner	Crime comedy	
Männer auf Rädern	Thomas Carlé	Eberhard Wolf, Johanna Lier	Comedy, Sport	
Maus und Katz	Hajo Gies	Mario Adorf, Ulrich Tukur, Jale Arıkan, Dieter Mann	Drama	
Me and Christine	Peter Stripp	Götz George, Christiane Paul	Drama	
Ein Mord danach	Wolfgang Storch	Roland Schäfer, Eleonore Weisgerber, Peter Matić	Thriller	
The Movie Teller	Bernhard Sinkel	Armin Mueller-Stahl, Martin Benrath, Eva Mattes, Otto Sander, Udo Samel, Tina Engel	Drama	a.k.a. The Film Narrator a.k.a. The Film Explainer
Mr. Bluesman	Sönke Wortmann	Thomas Heinze, Deborah Falconer, Lloyd Bridges	Comedy	
Mutter, ich will nicht sterben!	Helmut Ashley	Muriel Baumeister, Claudine Wilde	Drama	
The Name of Annabel Lee	Wolf Gremm	Heinz Hoenig, Stephanie Philipp, Ferdy Mayne	Thriller	a.k.a. Die Spur führt ins Verderben
Der Nebenbuhler	Heinz Schirk	Hannelore Elsner	Thriller	
Nervenkrieg	Pete Ariel	Heidelinde Weis, Manfred Zapatka	Thriller	
Neues Deutschland	Dani Levy, Uwe Janson, Philip Gröning, Maris Pfeiffer, Gerd Kroske	Ulrich Mühe, Dani Levy, Maria Schrader, Heino Ferch, Joachim Król	Anthology	
Night Train to Venice	Carlo U. Quinterio	Hugh Grant, Malcolm McDowell, Tahnee Welch, Kristina Söderbaum	Thriller	
No More Mr. Nice Guy	Detlev Buck	Joachim Król, Horst Krause, Sophie Rois	Comedy, Road movie	a.k.a. Wir können auch anders. Entered into the 43rd Berlin International Film Festival
Novalis: The Blue Flower	Herwig Kipping	Christoph Schiller, Gottfried John, Eva-Maria Hagen	Biography	
The Olympic Summer	Gordian Maugg	Jost Gerstein, Verena Plangger	Drama	
Pauline In Between	Peter Timm	Katja Riemann, Uwe Ochsenknecht, Henry Hübchen, Gudrun Landgrebe, Andrea L'Arronge	Comedy	a.k.a. Ein Mann für jede Tonart
Polski Crash	Kaspar Heidelbach	Klaus J. Behrendt, Jürgen Vogel, Clotilde Courau	Crime	German-Polish co-production
Die Ratte	Klaus Lemke	Thomas Kretschmann, Marco Heinz	Crime	a.k.a. The Rat
Republic of Dreams	Jens Carl Ehlers	Henryk Nolewajka, Edward Żentara, Katarzyna Walter, Loriano Della Rocca	Biography	a.k.a. Bruno Schulz – Republik der Träume. German-Polish co-production
Rosenemil	Radu Gabrea	Werner Stocker, Dana Vávrová, Dominique Sanda, Bernard-Pierre Donnadieu, Serge Reggiani	Drama	a.k.a. Rosen-Emil. German-French-Romanian co-production
Rotlicht	Michael Lähn	Helmut Zierl, Barbara Rudnik, Hanns Zischler	Crime	
Das Schicksal der Lilian H.	Marijan David Vajda	Claudia Michelsen, Francis Fulton-Smith	Drama	
Schöne Feindin	Peter Keglevic	Barbara Rudnik, Rainer Grenkowitz, Rüdiger Vogler	Drama	
Schramm	Jörg Buttgereit	Florian Koerner von Gustorf	Horror	
Der Showmaster	Hartmut Griesmayr	Harald Juhnke, Hans Peter Korff	Thriller	
Die skandalösen Frauen	Xaver Schwarzenberger	Julia Stemberger, Krista Posch, Wolfgang Hübsch	Drama	a.k.a. Die Schwestern Kleh a.k.a. Dark Angel. Austrian-German co-production
Soccer Love	Bernd Schadewald	Nicolette Krebitz, Niels Bruno Schmidt, Jürgen Vogel	Drama, Sport	a.k.a. Schicksalsspiel
Stalingrad	Joseph Vilsmaier	Thomas Kretschmann, Dominique Horwitz, Jochen Nickel, Martin Benrath	War	Entered into the 18th Moscow International Film Festival
Stich ins Herz	Hartmut Griesmayr	Ursela Monn, Anette Hellwig, Thomas Goritzki	Drama	
Stunde der Füchse	Detlef Rönfeldt	Siemen Rühaak, Jürgen Hentsch, Hanns Zischler, Ulrich Matschoss, Katrin Sass	Drama	
The Sun Goddess	Rudolf Thome	Radhe Schiff, John Shinavier	Drama	
Tafelspitz	Xaver Schwarzenberger	Annika Pages, Jan Niklas, Christiane Hörbiger, Otto Schenk	Comedy	Austrian-German co-production
Texas – Doc Snyder hält die Welt in Atem	Helge Schneider, Ralf Huettner	Helge Schneider	Comedy, Western	
Three Shake-a-leg Steps to Heaven	Andy Bausch	Udo Kier, Désirée Nosbusch, Richy Müller, Jürgen Vogel, Eddie Constantine	Crime comedy	Luxembourgish-German-Belgish co-production
Das Tier	Gert Steinheimer	Adolf Laimböck, Jutta Speidel, Hans Peter Korff, Heinz Meier	Comedy	
Das tödliche Auge	Detlef Rönfeldt	Ulrich Mühe, Susanne Lothar, Hans-Michael Rehberg	Thriller	
Tödliche Lüge	Ate de Jong	Barbara Auer, Hannes Jaenicke	Thriller	
Trip nach Tunis	Peter Goedel	David Hunt, Karen Sillas, Jill Hennessy, Peter Appel, Mustapha Adouani, Salah Jday	Drama	a.k.a. The Tremor of Forgery
Trouble	Penelope Buitenhuis	Yvonne Ducksworth, Françoise Cactus	Music	
Two Small Bodies	Beth B	Suzy Amis, Fred Ward	Thriller	
Die Umarmung des Wolfes	Rainer Wolffhardt	Leslie Malton, Robert Giggenbach, Donata Höffer	Crime	
An Unholy Love	Michael Verhoeven	Timothy Peach, Heike Falkenberg, Alexander May	Drama	
Ein unmöglicher Lehrer	Rolf Silber	Sebastian Koch	Comedy	
Vater Mutter Mörderkind	Heiner Carow	Klaus J. Behrendt, Franziska Troegner, Sebastian Reznicek	Drama	
Verkauftes Land	Horst Königstein	Rudolf Kowalski	Docudrama	
Veterinarian Christine	Otto Retzer	Uschi Glas, Ernest Borgnine, Horst Janson, Brent Huff	Drama	
Wehner – die unerzählte Geschichte	Heinrich Breloer	Ulrich Tukur, Lena Stolze, Heinz Baumann, Hans Peter Hallwachs	Biography	
Wer zweimal lügt	Bertram von Boxberg	Walter Buschhoff	Comedy	
Die Wildnis	Werner Masten	Jürgen Prochnow	Thriller	
Wo das Herz zu Hause ist	Herrmann Zschoche	Deborah Kaufmann, Stefan Reck, Albert Fortell	Drama	a.k.a. Where the Heart Is at Home
Younger and Younger	Percy Adlon	Donald Sutherland, Brendan Fraser, Lolita Davidovich	Comedy	American-German co-production
Zürich – Transit	Hilde Bechert	Dieter Kirchlechner	Drama	German-Swiss-Austrian co-production

== 1994 ==
Title	Director	Cast	Genre	Notes
00 Schneider – Jagd auf Nihil Baxter	Helge Schneider	Helge Schneider	Comedy	
71 Fragments of a Chronology of Chance	Michael Haneke	Lukas Miko, Otto Grünmandl, Udo Samel, Anne Bennent	Drama	Austrian-German co-production
Affären	Jacques Breuer	Sophie von Kessel, Daniela Amavia, Gedeon Burkhard	Comedy	
Amok	Peter Schulze-Rohr	Helmut Zierl, Loni von Friedl, Nicolette Krebitz	Thriller	
Amoklauf	Uwe Boll	Michael Rasmussen, Birgit Stein, Christian Kahrmann	Horror	a.k.a. Run Amok
Das andere Leben des Herrn Kreins	Andreas Dresen	Reimar Johannes Baur, Dietrich Körner	Drama	
Angst	Bernd Schadewald	Christian Redl, Renate Krößner, Antje Westermann	Drama	
Asterix Conquers America	Gerhard Hahn	—N/a	Animated	German-French co-production
Ausgerechnet Zoé	Markus Imboden	Nicolette Krebitz	Drama	
Das Baby der schwangeren Toten	Wolfgang Mühlbauer	Heino Ferch, Rosel Zech, Udo Wachtveitl, Hanns Zischler	Drama	
Babysitter	Peter Welz	Bernd Michael Lade, Eva Blum	Comedy	
Back to Square One	Reinhard Münster	Udo Samel, Katharina Thalbach, Christiane Hörbiger, Harald Juhnke, Detlev Buck	Comedy	a.k.a. Alles auf Anfang. Entered into the 44th Berlin International Film Festival
Backbeat	Iain Softley	Stephen Dorff, Sheryl Lee, Ian Hart, Kai Wiesinger	Biography, Music	British-German co-production
Der bewegte Mann	Sönke Wortmann	Til Schweiger, Katja Riemann, Joachim Król	Comedy	a.k.a. Maybe ... Maybe Not a.k.a. The Most Desired Man
The Blue One	Lienhard Wawrzyn	Manfred Krug, Ulrich Mühe, Meret Becker, Hanns Zischler	Drama	a.k.a. Der Blaue. Entered into the 44th Berlin International Film Festival
Bosom Friends	Heiko Schier	Meret Becker, Nina Kronjäger, Sebastian Koch, Heino Ferch	Drama	a.k.a. Freundinnen
Burning Life	Peter Welz	Maria Schrader, Anna Thalbach	Crime	
Bye Bye America	Jan Schütte	Otto Tausig, Yaakov Bodo, Zofia Merle	Drama	German-Polish co-production
Captive Love	Dagmar Damek	Senta Berger, Götz Behrendt	Drama	
The Carousel	Rolf von Sydow	Barbara Wussow, Jacques Breuer, Christiane Hörbiger	Drama	a.k.a. Karussell des Lebens
Charlie & Louise – Das doppelte Lottchen	Joseph Vilsmaier	Floriane Eichhorn, Fritzi Eichhorn, Corinna Harfouch, Heiner Lauterbach	Family	a.k.a. Charlie and Louise a.k.a. Charlie und Louise
Dangerous Games	Adolf Winkelmann	Nathaniel Parker, Gudrun Landgrebe	Thriller	
Deadly Obsession	Peter Patzak	Nicole Heesters, Thomas Kretschmann, Eberhard Feik, Claudia Michelsen	Drama	
Death in Miami	Carlo Rola	Iris Berben, Rüdiger Vogler, Suzanne von Borsody, Peter Sattmann	Drama	
Durst nach Rache	Wolfgang Luderer	Gila von Weitershausen, Anja Kruse, Sigmar Solbach	Drama	
Die Elefantenbraut	Dietrich Haugk	Leslie Malton, Rolf Hoppe, Ruth Maria Kubitschek, Heinz Baumann	Drama	
The Emperor's New Clothes	Juraj Herz	Harald Juhnke, Andréa Ferréol, Andrej Hryc	Family, Fantasy	Czech-German co-production
Endloser Abschied	Mathias Allary	Helmut Griem, Hilde Ziegler, Susanna Simon	Drama	
Farewell to Agnes	Michael Gwisdek	Michael Gwisdek, Sylvester Groth	Drama	
Fate	Fred Kelemen	Valerij Fedorenko, Sanja Spengler	Drama	a.k.a. Verhängnis
Felidae	Michael Schaack	—N/a	Animated, Mystery	
Fünf Millionen und ein paar Zerquetschte	Andy Bausch	Dietmar Schönherr, Gerd Baltus, Tilo Prückner, Rolf Zacher, Irm Hermann	Comedy	a.k.a. 5 Millionen und ein paar Zerquetschte
The Game Is Up	Rolf Silber	Rita Russek, Roman Knižka, Hans Peter Hallwachs	Crime	a.k.a. Ausgespielt
Der Gartenkrieg	Dieter Kehler	Hans Peter Korff, Ursela Monn	Comedy	
Geschäfte	Michael Schottenberg	Ulrich Tukur, Susanne Lothar, Ulrich Mühe	Thriller	Austrian-German co-production
Das gläserne Haus	Rainer Bär	Katja Riemann, Hansa Czypionka, Vadim Glowna	Drama	
Hate in the Head	Uwe Frießner	Markus Johannsen, Gerhard Olschewski, Ulrike Panse	Crime drama	a.k.a. Hatred in the Head
Heaven and Hell	Hans-Christian Schmid	Aline Metzner, Katja Riemann, Hannelore Hoger	Drama	
Der Heiratsvermittler	Erich Neureuther	Elmar Wepper, Mijou Kovacs, Harald Leipnitz	Comedy	
The High Crusade	Klaus Knoesel, Holger Neuhäuser	John Rhys-Davies, Rick Overton, Michael Des Barres, Ray Cokes	Comedy, Science fiction	
Hotel Interim	Christoph Doering	Isabella Parkinson, Bernhard Leute	Crime	
Ich bin nicht Gott, aber wie Gott	Claus Strobel	Hermann Lause	Docudrama	a.k.a. Ich bin nicht Gott, aber wie Gott – Günter Kaußen
Ich klage an	Frank Guthke	Thekla Carola Wied, Peter Sattmann, Heinz Hoenig	Drama	
Immer wenn sie Krimis liest	Andy Bausch	Marie-Luise Marjan, Tilo Prückner	Crime comedy	
The Invincibles	Dominik Graf	Herbert Knaup, Katja Flint, Heinz Hoenig, Hannes Jaenicke, Meret Becker, Hansa Czypionka, Natalia Wörner	Action thriller	a.k.a. Die Sieger
Jazz	Daniel Helfer	Pasquale Aleardi	Music, Comedy	a.k.a. Tschäss. Swiss-German-Austrian co-production
Judgment Day	Peter Keglevic	Christoph Waltz	Crime drama	a.k.a. Tag der Abrechnung – Der Amokläufer von Euskirchen
Julian H. Kidnapped	Vivian Naefe	Helmut Berger, Ben Becker, Christian Blümel, Kathrin Waligura	Thriller	a.k.a. Julian H. entführt – Qualen einer Mutter
Karakum	Arend Agthe, Uzmaan Saparov	Max Kullmann, Murad Orazov	Adventure	German-Turkmenistan co-production
Kein Platz für Idioten	Gedeon Kovács	Felix Thanheiser, Gilbert von Sohlern	Drama	
Der König von Dulsberg	Petra Haffter	Götz George, Angelika Milster, Katja Flint, Gert Haucke	Comedy	
The Last Cosmonaut	Nico Hofmann	Dominique Horwitz, Barbara Auer, Günter Lamprecht	Comedy	
Lauras Entscheidung	Uwe Janson	Suzanne von Borsody, Matthias Habich, Peter Sattmann, Heino Ferch	Thriller	
Lemgo	Jörg Grünler	Til Schweiger, Heinz Hoenig, Jasmin Tabatabai	Thriller	
Leni	Leo Hiemer	Hannes Thanheiser, Christa Berndl, Johanna Thanheiser, Natalia Wörner	Drama, War	
Die letzte Entscheidung	Beat Lottaz	Katja Flint, Michael Degen, Angelica Domröse	Drama	
Liebe am Abgrund	Georg Schiemann	Simone Thomalla, Hardy Krüger Jr., Gerd Silberbauer	Drama	
Linda	Ottokar Runze	Christel Harthaus, Paul Hubschmid, Bjørn Watt-Boolsen, Wolfgang Spier, Walter Renneisen, Diether Krebs	Comedy	(Shot in 1991)
Lisbon Story	Wim Wenders	Rüdiger Vogler, Patrick Bauchau	Drama	Screened at the 1995 Cannes Film Festival
The Little Innocent	Rainer Kaufmann	Christian Näthe, Jürgen Vogel, Nicolette Krebitz, Richy Müller, Herbert Knaup, Moritz Bleibtreu	Thriller	a.k.a. Unschuldsengel
Living Buddha	Clemens Kuby		Documentary	
Man in Search of Woman	Vivian Naefe	Christoph Waltz, Maja Maranow, Bettina Kupfer	Comedy	a.k.a. Man(n) sucht Frau
The Man in the Black Coat	Horst Königstein	Wolf-Dietrich Sprenger	Docudrama, Biography	
Der Mann mit der Maske	Peter Schulze-Rohr	Sebastian Koch, Jürgen Hentsch, Nicolette Krebitz	Thriller	
Marie's Song	Niko von Glasow	Sylvie Testud, Bastian Trost, Martin Feifel	Drama	
Mario and the Magician	Klaus Maria Brandauer	Klaus Maria Brandauer, Julian Sands, Anna Galiena, Rolf Hoppe, Elisabeth Trissenaar	Drama	German-Austrian-French co-production. Entered into the 19th Moscow International Film Festival
Der Menschenfresser	Otto Alexander Jahrreiss	Irene Kugler, Helmut Lorin	Thriller	
Mesmer	Roger Spottiswoode	Alan Rickman	Biography	Austrian-Canadian-British-German co-production
Eine Mörderin	Hartmut Griesmayr	Nicolin Kunz, Sascha Hehn, Udo Vioff	Thriller	
Mutter der Braut	Sven Severin	Loni von Friedl, Katharina Schubert, Jürgen Goslar	Comedy	
Eine Mutter kämpft um ihren Sohn	Károly Makk	Marianne Sägebrecht, Alexander Strobele, Marita Marschall, Günter Meisner	Drama	
Der Nachlass	Rüdiger Sünner	Ernst Jacobi, Katrin Sass	Drama	
Natalie – Teenage Hooker	Herrmann Zschoche	Anne-Sophie Briest	Drama	a.k.a. Natalie – Endstation Babystrich
Nobody Loves Me	Doris Dörrie	Maria Schrader, Pierre Sanoussi-Bliss, Michael von Au, Elisabeth Trissenaar, Joachim Król, Ingo Naujoks	Comedy	
Nostradamus	Roger Christian	Tchéky Karyo, Amanda Plummer, Julia Ormond, Assumpta Serna, Rutger Hauer, F. Murray Abraham	Biography	British-German-French-Romanian co-production
Das Phantom – Die Jagd nach Dagobert	Roland Suso Richter	Dieter Pfaff	Crime comedy	
Pumuckl und der blaue Klabauter	Horst Schier, Alfred Deutsch	Gustl Bayrhammer, Towje Kleiner, Wolfgang Völz	Live-action/animated, Family	
The Quality of Mercy	Andreas Gruber	Oliver Broumis, Merab Ninidze, Elfriede Irrall, Rüdiger Vogler, Thierry Van Werveke	War	a.k.a. Hasenjagd. Austrian-German co-production
Die Rachegöttin	Wolfgang Panzer	Ursula Dirichs, Lola Müthel, Rosemarie Fendel, Walter Schmidinger, Ulrich Wildgruber	Crime	
La Reine Margot	Patrice Chéreau	Isabelle Adjani, Daniel Auteuil, Jean-Hugues Anglade, Virna Lisi, Thomas Kretschmann	Historic drama	a.k.a. Queen Margot. French-German-Italian co-production
Rotwang Must Go!	Hans-Christoph Blumenberg	Udo Kier, Sybill Norvak, Heikko Deutschmann, Beate Finckh, Klaus Bueb, Horst Tomayer	Black comedy	a.k.a. To Hell with Rotwang!
Saubere Aktien	Berthold Mittermayr	Silvia Reize, Dietrich Mattausch, Rüdiger Vogler	Thriller	a.k.a. Clean Shares. Austrian-German co-production
Shameless	Horst Johann Sczerba	Meret Becker, Jürgen Vogel, Adolph Spalinger	Drama	a.k.a. Die Schamlosen
Simply Love	Peter Timm	Benno Fürmann, Regula Grauwiller, Uwe Ochsenknecht, Steffen Wink, Moritz Bleibtreu	Drama	
Sommerliebe	Iris Gusner	Iris Berben, Gedeon Burkhard	Drama	
Swingpfennig/Deutschmark	Margit Czenki	Françoise Cactus, Die Goldenen Zitronen	Music	
Tödliche Wahrheit	Rainer Wolffhardt	Helmut Berger, Rainer Grenkowitz, Katharina Meinecke, Berivan Kaya	Drama	
Tödliches Netz	Vivian Naefe	Gottfried John, Sydne Rome, Dominic Raacke, Niels Bruno Schmidt, Benno Fürmann, Ludger Pistor	Crime	a.k.a. Fatal Web
Traumstreuner	Erwin Michelberger	Hannes Thanheiser, Bernd Gnann	Drama	
Turn Down the Music	Thomas Arslan	Andreas Böhmer, Marco Germund, Andy Lehmann, Laura Tonke	Drama	
Um jeden Preis	Kai Wessel	Henry Hübchen, Christian Kohlund, Katja Woywood, Udo Schenk, Daniela Ziegler	Crime	a.k.a. Fette Jahre
Up and Down	Joseph Orr	Marco Bahr, Nadja Schulz, Sophie Rois	Comedy	a.k.a. Oben – Unten
Verrückt nach dir	Konrad Sabrautzky	Bernd Michael Lade, Elle Czischek	Drama	
Voll normaaal	Ralf Huettner	Tom Gerhardt, Hilmi Sözer	Comedy	
Weihnachten mit Willy Wuff	Maria Theresia Wagner	Ulrich Pleitgen, Gruschenka Stevens, Gisela Schneeberger, Marita Breuer	Family	
Weltmeister	Zoran Solomun	Alexander Meier, Grit Hornig	Drama, Music	
Wild Mountain Thyme	Gero Erhardt	Muriel Baumeister, Michael Roll, Helmut Zierl, Bernhard Wicki	Drama	a.k.a. Wilder Thymian
Women Are Simply Wonderful	Sherry Hormann	Barbara Auer, Thomas Heinze, Kai Wiesinger, Anica Dobra	Comedy	
You're Driving Me Crazy	Wolfram Paulus	Katja Flint, August Zirner, Herbert Fux	Comedy	a.k.a. You Drive Me Crazy a.k.a. Du bringst mich noch um. Austrian-German co-production
Zwei an der Strippe	Imo Moszkowicz	Regine Leonhardt, Rainer Grenkowitz	Comedy	

== 1995 ==
Title	Director	Cast	Genre	Notes
5 Stunden Angst – Geiselnahme im Kindergarten	Peter Keglevic	Anica Dobra, Hannes Jaenicke, Corinna Harfouch	Thriller	
Abgefahren	Uwe Frießner	Susanne Bormann	Crime	
Ach du fröhliche	Stefan Lukschy	Harald Juhnke, Nicole Heesters, Marijam Agischewa	Comedy	
After Five in the Forest Primeval	Hans-Christian Schmid	Franka Potente	Romantic comedy	a.k.a. It's a Jungle Out There. 2 Bavarian Film Awards
Angst hat eine kalte Hand	Matti Geschonneck	Katja Riemann, Cornelia Froboess, Udo Samel	Thriller	
Anna: Under the Spell of Evil	Dagmar Damek	Thomas Kretschmann, Pia Podgornik, Michael König, Regula Grauwiller	Thriller	a.k.a. Anna – Im Banne des Bösen
Ärztin in Angst	Bruce Seth Green	Leslie Malton, Hansa Czypionka, Siemen Rühaak	Thriller	a.k.a. Kidnapped
Ausweglos	Sigi Rothemund	August Zirner, Suzanne von Borsody, Johannes Brandrup, Saskia Vester, Robert Stadlober	Thriller	
Bauernschach	Helmut Berger	Mario Adorf, Otto Sander	Crime	Austrian-Swiss-German co-production
The Black Curse	Otto Retzer	James Brolin, Deborah Shelton, Brent Huff	Drama	
Blind Witness	Mario Azzopardi	Nina Kronjäger, Heio von Stetten	Thriller	a.k.a. Die einzige Zeugin
Blutige Spur	Carlo Rola	Jan Niklas, Hannelore Elsner, Sebastian Koch	Thriller	
Brother of Sleep	Joseph Vilsmaier	André Eisermann, Dana Vávrová, Ben Becker	Drama	Official Submission for the Academy Awards in 1995
Bunte Hunde	Lars Becker	Til Schweiger, Peter Lohmeyer, Christian Redl	Crime	a.k.a. The Break a.k.a. Mad Dogs
Catherine the Great	Marvin J. Chomsky, John Goldsmith	Catherine Zeta-Jones, Jeanne Moreau, Omar Sharif	Biography, History	American-German-Austrian co-production
The City of Lost Children	Marc Caro, Jean-Pierre Jeunet	Ron Perlman, Daniel Emilfork, Judith Vittet, Dominique Pinon, Jean-Claude Dreyfus, Geneviève Brunet, Odile Mallet, Mireille Mossé, Serge Merlin, François Hadji-Lazaro, Rufus, Ticky Holgado, Jean-Louis Trintignant	Science fantasy	French-German-Spanish-Belgian-British co-production
Club Las Piranjas	Ulli Baumann	Hape Kerkeling, Angelika Milster, Judy Winter, Horst Krause	Comedy	
Coswig & Sohn	Michael Braun	Robert Atzorn, Christine Neubauer, Oliver Grober	Comedy	a.k.a. Coswig und Sohn
Das ist dein Ende	Michael Keusch	Jennifer Nitsch, Max Volkert Martens, Hansa Czypionka	Drama	
Das schafft die nie	Lih Janowitz	Claudia Michelsen, Andreas Herder, Dieter Pfaff	Drama	a.k.a. She'll Never Make It
Death à la Carte	Roland Suso Richter	Maria Schrader, August Zirner	Thriller	a.k.a. Risiko Null – Der Tod steht auf dem Speiseplan
Deathmaker	Romuald Karmakar	Götz George, Jürgen Hentsch	Docudrama, Crime	Official Submission for the Academy Awards in 1996; Based on the interrogation of murderer Fritz Haarmann
Dicke Freunde	Horst Königstein	Josef Bierbichler, Horst Krause	Biography, Comedy	
A Dream, What Else?	Hans-Jürgen Syberberg	Edith Clever	Drama	
The Drinker	Tom Toelle	Harald Juhnke	Drama	a.k.a. The Drunkard
Eingeschlossen – Die Nacht mit einem Mörder	Rainer Bär	Anja Kling, Peter Sattmann	Thriller	a.k.a. Nacht ohne Ausweg
The Empty House	Hans-Jürgen Tögel	Kerstin Draeger, Heikko Deutschmann, Ruth Maria Kubitschek	Drama	a.k.a. Sommer am Meer
The End of Summer	Hans-Jürgen Tögel	Iris Junik, Diego Wallraff	Drama	a.k.a. Das Ende eines Sommers
Die Eroberung der Mitte	Robert Bramkamp	Peter Lohmeyer, Karina Fallenstein	Drama	
Ex	Mark Schlichter	Robert Viktor Minich, Christiane Paul, Florian Lukas, Heinz Hoenig	Crime	
Die Falle	Michael Lähn	Sabrina Ferilli, Jürgen Heinrich, Gottfried John	Thriller	
Ein falscher Schritt	Hermine Huntgeburth	Barbara Auer, Ulrich Matthes, Dagmar Manzel	Comedy	
Family of Lies	Detlef Rönfeldt	Michel Piccoli, Marthe Keller, Christian Kohlund, Peter Simonischek, Friedrich von Thun, Suzanne von Borsody	Drama	a.k.a. Tödliches Geld – Das Gesetz der Belmonts
Fatale Mutterliebe	Michael Keusch	Marijam Agischewa, Ralf Richter, Heio von Stetten, Veronica Ferres	Thriller	
Forgiveness	Andreas Höntsch	Lena Stolze, Sylvester Groth	Drama	
Gabriellas Rache	Eberhard Itzenplitz	Heidelinde Weis, Manfred Zapatka, Lambert Hamel	Crime comedy	
Gentleman	Oskar Roehler	Kurt Leiner	Thriller	
Glück auf Kredit	Marcus Scholz	Inge Meysel, Ulrike Folkerts, Charles Régnier, Ulrich Pleitgen	Comedy	
Der große Abgang	Nico Hofmann	Barbara Auer, Jörg Schüttauf, Birgit Doll	Thriller	
Die Grube	Karl Fruchtmann	Peter Fitz, Ernst Jacobi, Helmut Griem	War, Docudrama	
Habt euch bitte wieder lieb!	Ute Wieland	Carin C. Tietze, Thomas Heinze	Drama	
Hades	Herbert Achternbusch	Herbert Achternbusch	Drama	Entered into the 45th Berlin International Film Festival
Halali	Joachim Roering	Constanze Engelbrecht, Walter Giller, Hans Peter Korff, Karl Schönböck, Gert Haucke	Comedy	a.k.a. Halali oder Der Schuß ins Brötchen a.k.a. Halali oder Der Schuss ins Brötchen
Half Moon	Irene von Alberti, Frieder Schlaich	Samir Guesmi, Khaled Ksouri, Sondos Belhassen, Veronica Quilligan, Sam Cox	Anthology	a.k.a. Paul Bowles: Half Moon
Heaven or Bust	Peter F. Bringmann	Götz George, Ingo Naujoks, Anja Kling	Science fiction, Comedy	a.k.a. Die Sturzflieger
Heimliche Zeugen	Oley Sassone	Constanze Engelbrecht, Rufus Beck, Vadim Glowna	Thriller	a.k.a. Heimliche Zeugin
Ein Herz für Laura	Hartmut Griesmayr	Robert Atzorn, Gerit Kling	Drama	
Hölleisengretl	Jo Baier	Martina Gedeck	Drama	
Hotel Mama	Gert Steinheimer	Diana Körner, Dietrich Mattausch, Nele Mueller-Stöfen, Michael Kessler, Peer Augustinski	Comedy	
I Desire You	Peter Weck	Christiane Hörbiger, Francis Fulton-Smith, Peter Weck, Dietrich Mattausch, Doris Kunstmann	Drama	
I Love My Daughter's Husband	Vivian Naefe	Gudrun Landgrebe, Thomas Kretschmann, Muriel Baumeister, Friedrich von Thun	Drama	
Ich bin unschuldig – Ärztin im Zwielicht	Frank Guthke	Suzanne von Borsody, Matthias Habich, Udo Samel	Drama	
Ich, der Boss	Martin Gies	Jan Josef Liefers, Leslie Malton	Comedy	
In uns die Hölle	Urs Egger	Katja Flint, Max Tidof, Karlheinz Hackl, Claude-Oliver Rudolph	Thriller	a.k.a. Zwischen zwei Männern – Die Liebe einer Frau
Institute Benjamenta	Brothers Quay	Mark Rylance, Alice Krige, Gottfried John	Drama	a.k.a. Jakob von Gunten. British-German-Japanese co-production
In the Flesh	Nikolai Müllerschön	Nicolette Krebitz, Matt McCoy, Marita Geraghty, Marco Leonardi, Paul Winfield, Carroll Baker	Thriller	a.k.a. Desperate Measures a.k.a. Nanny's Nightmare
Inka Connection	Wolf Gremm	Heinz Hoenig, Sabrina Ferilli, Vadim Glowna, Alexander May, Anita Kupsch, Max Volkert Martens	Thriller, Science fiction	
Is Mausi Coming Out?	Alexander Scherer, Angelina Maccarone	Julia Richter, Inga Busch, Alexandra Wilcke	Drama	
Japaner sind die besseren Liebhaber	Philipp Weinges	Thomas Heinze, Katharina Müller-Elmau, Katharina Schubert, Akihiro Hamano	Comedy	
Jenseits der Brandung	Peter Patzak	Claudia Michelsen, Thomas Kretschmann, Maria de Medeiros	Drama	
The Judge and the Girl	Rainer Boldt	Udo Schenk	Thriller	
Katharina	Barbara Trottnow	Heidi Ecks	Docudrama	a.k.a. Katharina oder: Die Kunst, Arbeit zu finden
Kiss Me!	Maris Pfeiffer	Caroline Redl, Kai Scheve, Tobias Langhoff	Comedy	
Knallhart daneben	Sigi Rothemund	Elmar Wepper, Felix von Manteuffel	Crime comedy	
Kopfjagd	Éric Civanyan	Valentine Varela, Max Tidof, Santha Leng	Comedy	a.k.a. Prise de têtes. French-German co-production
Der Leihmann	Claus-Michael Rohne	Kai Wiesinger, Chantal de Freitas, Ulrike Folkerts, Birge Schade	Comedy	
Ein letzter Wille	Kai Wessel	Angela Winkler, Gottfried John, Lotte Loebinger	Drama	
Looosers!	Christopher Roth	Bernd Michael Lade, Oliver Korittke	Comedy	
Luise and the Jackpot	Menahem Golan	Marianne Sägebrecht, Oliver Reed, David Warner	Comedy	
Magic Girl	Vivian Naefe	Herbert Knaup, Sandra Speichert	Drama	a.k.a. Zaubergirl a.k.a. Wonder Girl
Mami, ich will bei dir bleiben	Sigi Rothemund	Susanne Lüning, Siemen Rühaak, Günter Mack	Drama	
Der Mann auf der Bettkante	Christoph Eichhorn	Götz George, Constanze Engelbrecht, Michael Gwisdek	Comedy	
The Meds	Matthias Glasner	Jürgen Vogel, Jasmin Tabatabai, Dani Levy	Comedy	a.k.a. Die Mediocren
Mein unbekannter Ehemann	Andreas Dresen	Adé Sapara, Sabine Urig, Jeannette Arndt	Drama	
Les Milles	Sébastien Grall	Jean-Pierre Marielle, Rüdiger Vogler, Philippe Noiret, Kristin Scott Thomas	War	French-German-Polish co-production
Mit verbundenen Augen	Marijan David Vajda	Ursula Buschhorn, Herbert Knaup, Tina Engel, Wilfried Baasner, Armin Rohde	Thriller	
Moondance	Dagmar Hirtz	Rúaidhrí Conroy, Ian Shaw, Julia Brendler, Marianne Faithfull	Drama	Irish-German co-production
Der Mörder des Babysitters	Kaspar Heidelbach	Nicolette Krebitz, Jürgen Vogel, Armin Rohde, Suzanne von Borsody	Thriller	a.k.a. Babyfon – Mörder im Kinderzimmer
Der Mörder und sein Kind	Matti Geschonneck	Ulrich Tukur	Thriller	
Eine mörderische Liebe	Friedemann Fromm	Hannes Jaenicke, Stefania Orsola Garello, Ralf Richter	Thriller	
Mörderische Zwillinge	Dominique Othenin-Girard	Claudia Michelsen, Horst-Günter Marx	Thriller	
The Morning After	Gabriela Zerhau	Jürgen Vogel, Julia Stemberger	Drama	a.k.a. Magnus
Mrs. Klein	Ingemo Engström	Erika Pluhar	Drama	
My Mother's Courage	Michael Verhoeven	Pauline Collins, Ulrich Tukur	World War II drama	German-Austrian-British co-production
My Sister's Good Fortune	Angela Schanelec	Wolfgang Michael, Angela Schanelec, Anna Bolk	Drama	
… nächste Woche ist Frieden	Peter Schulze-Rohr	Ulrich Mühe, Rita Russek, Hans Peter Korff	War, Drama	
Die Nacht der Nächte	Xaver Schwarzenberger	Senta Berger, Harald Pichlhöfer, Susi Nicoletti, Frank Hoffmann, Maria Perschy	Crime comedy	Austrian-German co-production
Nana	Miguel Alexandre	Bernadette Heerwagen, Ulrich Pleitgen	Drama	
Natale con papà	Giorgio Capitani	Gabriele Ferzetti, Michael Roll, Liselotte Pulver	Comedy	a.k.a. Weihnachtsfest mit Hindernissen. Italian-German co-production
Neurosia: 50 Years of Perversity	Rosa von Praunheim	Désirée Nick, Rosa von Praunheim, Evelyn Künneke, Lotti Huber	Comedy	
Nich' mit Leo	Ralf Gregan	Jürgen von der Lippe, Harald Schmidt, Herbert Feuerstein	Comedy	
Nikolaikirche	Frank Beyer	Barbara Auer, Ulrich Matthes, Ulrich Mühe, Ulrich Tukur, Otto Sander, Claudia Messner	Drama	a.k.a. Nikolai Church
Nur der Sieg zählt	Uwe Janson	Christiane Paul, Heino Ferch, Lena Stolze, Peter Sattmann, Claudine Wilde, Jürgen Hentsch	Drama, Sport	
One More Kiss and He's Dead!	Hans-Christoph Blumenberg	Peter Fitz	Biography	a.k.a. Beim nächsten Kuß knall' ich ihn nieder a.k.a. Beim nächsten Kuss knall' ich ihn nieder
One of My Oldest Friends	Rainer Kaufmann	Richy Müller, Maria Schrader, Peter Lohmeyer	Comedy	
Operation Medusa	Thorsten Näter	Franziska Petri, Uwe Kockisch	Thriller	
Outside Time	Andreas Kleinert	Julia Jäger, Mikhail Porechenkov, Rosel Zech, Sylvester Groth	Drama	a.k.a. Neben der Zeit
Over My Dead Body	Rainer Matsutani	Katja Riemann, Christoph M. Ohrt, Ulrike Folkerts, Udo Kier	Comedy	
Pilots	Christian Petzold	Eleonore Weisgerber, Nadeshda Brennicke	Drama	a.k.a. Pilotinnen
Pregnant Danger	Markus Fischer	Natalia Wörner, Rita Lengyel, Gabriel Barylli	Thriller	a.k.a. Blut an der Wiege
Prinz zu entsorgen	Dietmar Klein	Christoph Waltz, Maren Schumacher, Marita Marschall	Comedy	
The Promise	Margarethe von Trotta	Corinna Harfouch, Meret Becker, August Zirner, Anian Zollner	Drama	Official Submission for the Academy Awards in 1994; Romantic Drama beginning during the rise and ending with the fall of the Berlin Wall
Rache	Bernd Michael Lade	Sven Martinek, Christian Brückner, Leander Haußmann	Thriller	
The Real Shlemiel	Albert Hanan Kaminski	—N/a	Animated	Israeli-German-Hungarian-French co-production
Rohe Ostern	Michael Gutmann	Oliver Korittke, Anian Zollner, Julia Jäger, Axel Milberg, Karl Lieffen	Comedy	
Roula	Martin Enlen	Anica Dobra, Martin Umbach, Ernst Jacobi	Thriller	
Rudy, the Racing Pig	Peter Timm	Ulrich Mühe, Iris Berben, Karl Lieffen	Family	a.k.a. Rennschwein Rudi Rüssel
Russian Roulette: Moscow 95	Menahem Golan	Barbara Carrera, Oliver Reed, Jan-Michael Vincent	Thriller	
Der Sandmann	Nico Hofmann	Götz George, Karoline Eichhorn, Barbara Rudnik	Thriller	
Satan's Children	Bernd Schadewald	Nicolette Krebitz, Moritz Bleibtreu, Christian Redl	Thriller	
Sau sticht	Heidi Kranz	Monika Baumgartner, August Schmölzer, Maria Singer, Jörg Hube	Comedy	
Schlag weiter, kleines Kinderherz!	Michael Werlin	Anne Kasprik, Jacques Breuer	Drama	
Schrecklicher Verdacht	Jeannot Szwarc	Sebastian Koch, Susanne Schäfer	Thriller	a.k.a. Crossfire
Secret of Love	Rudolf Thome	Adriana Altaras, Johannes Herrschmann, İdil Üner, Wolfgang Böhmer, Marquard Bohm	Comedy, Fantasy	a.k.a. Das Geheimnis
Silent Night	Dani Levy	Maria Schrader, Jürgen Vogel, Ingrid Caven	Drama	German-Swiss co-production
Sleeping Tiger	Rolf von Sydow	Stephan Schwartz, Inka Groetschel, Andrea L'Arronge	Drama	a.k.a. Schlafender Tiger
Spreebogen	Konrad Sabrautzky	Rolf Hoppe, Hannelore Elsner, Markus Knüfken, Traugott Buhre, Jaecki Schwarz	Comedy	
Spur eines Zweifels	Hartmut Griesmayr	Uwe Ochsenknecht, Jennifer Nitsch	Thriller	
The Start of Something	Nikolaus Leytner	Christoph Waltz, Sandra Cervik	Drama	a.k.a. Ein Anfang von etwas. Austrian-German co-production
Stirb für mich	Michael Gutmann	Kai Wiesinger, Ana Álvarez, Antonio Valero	Thriller	a.k.a. Life and Limb
Sven's Secret	Roland Suso Richter	Christopher Erbslöh, Katharina Meinecke	Drama	
Talk of the Town	Rainer Kaufmann	Katja Riemann, August Zirner, Kai Wiesinger, Martina Gedeck, Moritz Bleibtreu	Comedy	
Theaterdonner	Stefan Lukschy	Heidi Kabel, Tilo Prückner, Beatrice Richter	Comedy	
Three Days in April	Oliver Storz	Karoline Eichhorn	Drama	a.k.a. 3 Days in April
Three Women and a... Man?	Hans-Jürgen Tögel	Maria Furtwängler, Christian Berkel, Katharina Stemberger	Comedy	a.k.a. Drei Frauen und (k)ein Mann
Till Death Do Us Part	Xaver Schwarzenberger	Jürgen Prochnow, Katharina Böhm, Cornelia Froboess	Thriller	a.k.a. Fesseln
Tödliche Hochzeit	Martin Enlen	Brigitte Karner, Martin Halm, Michael Mendl, Arthur Brauss	Thriller	
Tödliches Erbe	Sigi Rothemund	Hildegard Knef, Horst Buchholz, Ulrich Wildgruber	Thriller	
Tödliches Leben	Richard Engel	Ursula Karven, Bernd Herzsprung, Susanne Uhlen	Drama	
Tot auf Halde	Theodor Kotulla	Peter Striebeck, Rolf Becker, Susanne Schulten, Markus Pfeiffer, Alexander Radszun	Drama	
Tränen eines Siegers	Jens Hercher	Fabian Harloff, Manfred Zapatka, Renate Krößner, Anouschka Renzi	Drama, Sport	
Transatlantis	Christian Wagner	Daniel Olbrychski	Drama	Entered into the 45th Berlin International Film Festival
A Trick of Light	Wim Wenders	Udo Kier	Biography	a.k.a. Die Gebrüder Skladanowsky
Über Kreuz	Imo Moszkowicz	Regine Leonhardt, Gerd Anthoff, Gundi Ellert, Michael Roll, Tilo Prückner	Drama	
Under Gemini	Rolf von Sydow	Stephanie Philipp, Oliver Tobias, Ulrike Kriener, Anneliese Uhlig, Monika Peitsch	Drama	a.k.a. Wechselspiel der Liebe
Under the Milky Way	Matthias X. Oberg	Fabian Busch, Sophie Rois, Christiane Paul, Detlev Buck	Comedy	
Unter Druck	Peter Pistor	Nicolette Krebitz, Kai Wiesinger, Natalia Wörner, Carin C. Tietze	Thriller	
Verbotene Zone	Markus Fischer	Barbara Auer	Thriller	
Verliebte Feinde	Bernd Böhlich	Iris Berben, Peter Sattmann	Drama	
Voices in Summer	Rolf von Sydow	Marijam Agischewa, Klaus Wildbolz, Lisa Kreuzer, Klausjürgen Wussow	Drama	a.k.a. Wolken am Horizont
Von Arzt zu Arzt	Michael Günther	Helmut Zierl	Drama	
Wer Kollegen hat, braucht keine Feinde	Martin Enlen	Heino Ferch, Martina Gedeck, Hans Werner Meyer	Drama	
While All Germans Sleep	Frank Beyer	Benjamin Kaatz, Ilja Smoljanski, Robin Timptner	Drama, War	
Wilder Westerwald	Bernd Löhr	Claudia Michelsen, Ellen ten Damme	Comedy	
A Woman at the Top	Bodo Fürneisen	Thekla Carola Wied, Peter Sattmann, Anja Kling	Drama	a.k.a. Eine Frau will nach oben
Das Wunschkind	Gabriela Zerhau	Bettina Kupfer, Heiner Lauterbach, Konstanze Breitebner	Drama	
Zu treuen Händen	Konrad Sabrautzky	Sophie von Kessel, Rolf Hoppe	Comedy	

== 1996 ==
Title	Director	Cast	Genre	Notes
Abbuzze! Der Badesalz-Film	Roland Willaert	Badesalz	Comedy	
Adrenalin	Dominique Othenin-Girard	Til Schweiger	Action thriller	
The Adventures of Pinocchio	Steve Barron	Martin Landau, Udo Kier, Rob Schneider, Geneviève Bujold	Family	American-Czech-German-British-French co-production
Die Aktion	Thomas Bohn	Désirée Nosbusch, Hannes Jaenicke, Ingo Naujoks	Comedy	
Alle haben geschwiegen	Norbert Kückelmann	Wolfram Berger, Alexander Held, Dominic Raacke	Crime	
Alte Freunde küsst man nicht	Detlef Rönfeldt	Barbara Wussow, Stephan Schwartz, Peter Sattmann, Siemen Rühaak, Mathieu Carrière	Drama	
And Nobody Weeps for Me	Joseph Vilsmaier	Peter Ketnath, Nina Hoss	Drama	a.k.a. Und keiner weint mir nach
Der andere Wolanski	Hartmut Griesmayr	Hans Peter Korff, Stefanie Stappenbeck, Andrea L'Arronge, Jürgen Holtz	Crime	
Another View	Thomas Nikel	Anja Kling, Rainer Grenkowitz, Felix von Manteuffel	Drama	a.k.a. Lichterspiele
Asphaltflimmern	Johannes Hebendanz	Thorsten Schätz, Fati Sengül, Oda Pretschner	Road movie	a.k.a. Flickering Roads
Beyond Silence	Caroline Link	Sylvie Testud, Howie Seago, Emmanuelle Laborit, Sibylle Canonica, Matthias Habich	Drama	1997 Academy Award Nominee for Best Foreign Film
Black Jack	Ulli Baumann	Martin Semmelrogge, Oliver Böttcher, Katharina Schubert	Comedy	
Brennendes Herz	Peter Patzak	Helmut Griem, Thomas Kretschmann, Dominique Sanda, Claudia Michelsen, Dieter Laser, John Phillip Law	Biography	a.k.a. The Owl of Minerva a.k.a. Das Ohr des Malchus. German-Austrian co-production
Brothers on Life and Death	Friedemann Fromm	Gottfried John, Ralph Herforth, Felix Eitner	Crime	
The Burning Snail	Thomas Stiller	Maximilian Haas, Barbara Auer, Sebastian Koch	Drama	
Charley's Aunt	Sönke Wortmann	Thomas Heinze, Horst Krause, Max Raabe, Niels Ruf, Dorkas Kiefer	Comedy	
The Cleaning Ladies Island	Peter Timm	Jasmin Tabatabai	Comedy	a.k.a. The Clean-Up
Conversation with the Beast	Armin Mueller-Stahl	Armin Mueller-Stahl, Bob Balaban, Katharina Böhm, Harald Juhnke, Dieter Laser, Hark Bohm, Otto Sander	Drama	
Crash Kids	Petra Haffter	Isabell Gerschke, Marek Harloff, Barbara Rudnik	Crime	
Cuba Libre	Christian Petzold	Richy Müller, Catherine Flemming	Comedy	
Damn, He Loves Me	Sven Severin	Corinna Harfouch, Timothy Peach, Helmut Berger, Susanne Bormann	Comedy	
Dangerous Dowry	Dennis Satin	Katja Riemann, Hannes Jaenicke, Heinz Hoenig	Crime	a.k.a. Nur aus Liebe
Deadly Silence	Bernd Böhlich	Bruno Ganz, Ulrich Mühe	Drama	
Deathline	Ralf Huettner	Gruschenka Stevens, Sophie Rois, Dominic Raacke, Claude-Oliver Rudolph, Eva Hassmann	Thriller	a.k.a. Der kalte Finger
Diebinnen	Peter Weck	Christiane Hörbiger, Lena Stolze, Jennifer Nitsch, Francis Fulton-Smith	Crime comedy	a.k.a. Lady Thieves a.k.a. Women Robbers
Dr. Berg – Nur das Leben zählt	Josée Dayan	Rüdiger Vogler, Évelyne Bouix, Pierre Arditi, Julie Depardieu, Catherine Wilkening, Maria Schell	Drama	a.k.a. Une clinique au soleil a.k.a. La Passion du docteur Bergh a.k.a. Der rostende Ruhm. French-German co-production
Ehebruch – Eine teuflische Falle	Sigi Rothemund	Leslie Malton, Miguel Herz-Kestranek, Judy Winter, Hanns Zischler	Thriller	
Eldorado	Rüdiger Nüchtern	Steffen Wink, Mario Irrek, Rebecca Immanuel	Crime	
Das Ende eines normalen Tages	Heide Pils	Ulrich Pleitgen, Alana Bock, Stefan Reck, Sheri Hagen, Michael Ojake	Crime	
Fähre in den Tod	Heiner Carow	Sebastian Koch, Jürgen Hentsch, Hellmut Lange, Klaus J. Behrendt, Julia Richter, Lisa Kreuzer, Herb Andress	Disaster	
Eine fast perfekte Liebe	Lutz Konermann	Inga Busch, Andreas Herder, Natja Brunckhorst	Comedy	a.k.a. An Almost Perfect Love
Father's Day	Sherry Hormann	Corinna Harfouch, Herbert Knaup, Natalia Wörner, Richy Müller, Axel Milberg	Comedy	a.k.a. Irren ist männlich
The First Time	Connie Walther	Lavinia Wilson, Benno Fürmann, Hannes Jaenicke	Comedy	
Flight of the Albatross	Werner Meyer	Taungaroa Emile, Julia Brendler	Drama	NZ-German co-production
Gates of Fire	Kaspar Heidelbach	Götz George, Klaus J. Behrendt, Corinna Harfouch	Thriller	
Gefährliche Freundin	Hermine Huntgeburth	Katharina Thalbach, Corinna Harfouch	Drama	
Der gefälschte Sommer	Renate Brackhahn-Witt	Helmut Griem, Iris Berben	Crime comedy	
A Girl Called Rosemary	Bernd Eichinger	Nina Hoss, Heiner Lauterbach, Mathieu Carrière, Horst Krause, Hannelore Elsner, Katja Flint, Til Schweiger	Drama	a.k.a. The Girl Rosemarie
Gnadenlos – Zur Prostitution gezwungen	Gabi Kubach	Laura Tonke, Günther Maria Halmer, Leon Boden, Deborah Kaufmann, Irm Hermann	Crime	
Greenhorn	Rainer Kaufmann	Nicolette Krebitz, Kai Wiesinger	Comedy	
Honigmond	Gabriel Barylli	Veronica Ferres, Anica Dobra, Julia Stemberger, Kai Wiesinger, Uwe Ochsenknecht	Comedy	
The Ice Princess	Danny Huston	Katarina Witt	Musical	
Im Rausch der Liebe	Markus Fischer	Nina Bagusat, Philipp Stengele, Rolf Hoppe	Road movie, Drama	
In the Wrong Hands	Gloria Behrens	Gedeon Burkhard, Judy Winter	Drama	a.k.a. Wem gehört Tobias? a.k.a. Mit aller Gewalt – Mein Sohn gehört mir
Jackpot	Hartmut Griesmayr	Claudia Michelsen, Dieter Landuris, Bernd Michael Lade, Petra Kleinert, Moritz Bleibtreu	Crime comedy	
Jailbirds	Detlev Buck	Til Schweiger, Heike Makatsch, Marie Bäumer, Detlev Buck	Comedy	a.k.a. Männerpension
Katrin und Wladimir	Jens Becker	Lenn Kudrjawizki, Janine Hélène, Marianne Sägebrecht	Drama	
Killer Condom	Martin Walz	Udo Samel, Peter Lohmeyer, Iris Berben	Horror comedy	a.k.a. Kondom des Grauens
The Killer's Mother	Volker Einrauch	Dieter Landuris, Peter Lohmeyer	Comedy	a.k.a. Die Mutter des Killers
Kinder der Nacht	Nina Grosse	Natalia Wörner, Herbert Knaup, Matthias Paul	Drama	
Kinder ohne Gnade	Claudia Prietzel	Fabian Busch, Marek Harloff, Ulrike Panse	Drama	
Kreis der Angst	Thomas Jauch	Katja Flint, Sandra Speichert	Thriller	
Landgang für Ringo	Bernd Schadewald	Benno Fürmann, Jale Arıkan, Oliver Stokowski, Birol Ünel, Juraj Kukura, Nadeshda Brennicke	Drama	
The Last Courier	Adolf Winkelmann	Sergei Garmash, Sissi Perlinger, Hanns Zischler	Thriller	
Lautlose Schritte	Christian von Castelberg	Katja Flint, Christian Berkel, Oana Solomon, Ulrich Noethen	Thriller	
Liane	Horst Königstein	Ina Paule Klink, Luci Van Org, Horst Krause, Annette Uhlen, Udo Lindenberg, Nadja Tiller, Marion Michael	Biography, Musical	
Liebe, Leben, Tod	Mathias Allary	İdil Üner, Jacques Breuer, Katharina Thalbach, Christine Buchegger, Susanna Simon	Comedy	
Life Is a Bluff	Peter Zingler	Mario Adorf, Ben Becker, Muriel Baumeister, Elke Sommer, Heinz Hoenig, Claude-Oliver Rudolph, Martin Semmelrogge	Crime comedy	a.k.a. Alles nur Tarnung
Lilien in der Bank	Marianne Rosenbaum, Gérard Samaan	Werner Schneyder, Georg Thomalla, Katharina Thalbach, Nina Hagen, Konstantin Wecker, Wenzel Brücher	Comedy	(Shot in 1992)
Little Angel	Helke Misselwitz	Susanne Lothar, Cezary Pazura	Drama	
Loose Ends	Sandra Nettelbeck	Regula Grauwiller, Jasmin Tabatabai, Horst-Günter Marx, Natascha Bub	Comedy	a.k.a. Unbeständig und kühl
Maja	Volker Maria Arend	Annett Renneberg, Steffen Wink	Drama	
Der Mörder und die Hure	Michael Lähn	Sebastian Koch, Katja Studt	Crime	
Nach uns die Sintflut	Sigi Rothemund	Leslie Malton, Nina Petri, Hanns Zischler, Robert Stadlober	Disaster	a.k.a. In Deep Water
Die Nacht hat 17 Stunden	Diethard Klante	Heinz Hoenig, Dana Vávrová, August Zirner, Sebastian Koch, Johanna Klante	Drama	a.k.a. Die Nacht hat siebzehn Stunden
Nadja – Heimkehr in die Fremde	Thorsten Näter	Inka Friedrich, Ulrich Mühe, Dietmar Bär, Rolf Hoppe	Drama	
Natascha – Wettlauf mit dem Tod	Bernd Böhlich	Julia Jäger, Florian Martens, Otto Mellies, Luise Helm, Hans Peter Hallwachs, Maja Maranow	Drama	a.k.a. Faith Healer a.k.a. Natasha – Race with Death
Never Kiss Your Boss	Heidi Kranz	Esther Schweins, Ralf Bauer	Comedy	
No One but Me	Florian Gärtner	Sanam Afrashteh, Oliver Simon, Leander Lichti	Drama	a.k.a. Niemand außer mir
The Ogre	Volker Schlöndorff	John Malkovich, Armin Mueller-Stahl, Gottfried John, Marianne Sägebrecht	Drama, War	French-German-British co-production
Der Pakt – Wenn Kinder töten	Miguel Alexandre	Daniel Brühl	Crime drama	
Der Parkhausmörder	Michael Keusch	Barbara Rudnik, Marita Marschall, Ulrich Noethen	Thriller	
Peanuts – The Bank Pays Everything	Carlo Rola	Ulrich Mühe, Iris Berben, Marita Marschall, Sonja Kirchberger, Rüdiger Vogler, Rufus Beck, Traugott Buhre	Comedy	
Reise nach Weimar	Dominik Graf	Barbara Auer, Sylvester Groth, Rosemarie Fendel	Comedy	
Rivalen am Abgrund	Michael Steinke	Christoph M. Ohrt, Michael Roll, Ann-Kathrin Kramer	Drama	
Regular Guys	Rolf Silber	Christoph M. Ohrt, Carin C. Tietze, Tim Bergmann, Oliver Stokowski	Comedy	a.k.a. Echte Kerle
Schlag 12	Sigi Rothemund	Matthias Habich, Anica Dobra, Ingo Naujoks	Thriller	a.k.a. Schlag Zwölf
Der schönste Tag im Leben	Jo Baier	Martina Gedeck, Heio von Stetten, Jörg Hube	Comedy	
Schuldig auf Verdacht	Petra Haffter	Peter Sattmann, Mareike Carrière, Regula Grauwiller, Hansa Czypionka, Vera Tschechowa, Mathieu Carrière	Drama	
September	Colin Bucksey	Jacqueline Bisset, Michael York, Edward Fox, Jenny Agutter, Mariel Hemingway	Drama	British-American-German co-production
Seven Servants	Daryush Shokof	Anthony Quinn, Alexandra Stewart, David Warner	Drama	German-American co-production
Sexy Sadie	Matthias Glasner	Jürgen Vogel, Corinna Harfouch	Crime	
Snow in April	Rolf von Sydow	Fiona Coors, Patrick Winczewski, Claudine Wilde, Mark Keller, Diana Körner	Drama	a.k.a. Schneesturm im Frühling
Der Sohn des Babymachers	Susanne Zanke	Peter Bongartz, Cornelia Froboess, Alexander Pschill	Comedy	
Die Stimme des Mörders	Otto Alexander Jahrreiss	Jochen Horst, Anouschka Renzi	Thriller	
Sünde einer Nacht	Michael Keusch	Claudia Michelsen, Johannes Brandrup, Désirée Nosbusch, Francis Fulton-Smith, Horst Frank, Ivan Desny	Thriller	
Das Süße der Fremden	Michael Kobs	Torsten Ranft	Thriller	
Superbrain	Menahem Golan	Oliver Reed, Tina Ruland, Hanns Zischler	Crime	a.k.a. Die Tunnelgangster von Berlin
The Superwife	Sönke Wortmann	Veronica Ferres, Til Schweiger, Joachim Król, Liselotte Pulver, Richy Müller, Heiner Lauterbach, Esther Schweins, Thomas Heinze	Comedy	
Teenage Wolfpack	Urs Egger	Til Schweiger, Sandra Speichert, Roman Knižka, Frank Giering	Crime drama	a.k.a. Die Halbstarken
Tod im Paradies – Blutspur in die Karibik	Sigi Rothemund	Richy Müller, Johanna Klante, Martin Gruber, Doris Kunstmann	Thriller	
Tödliche Schwesternliebe	Samir	Anica Dobra, Claudia Messner	Drama	
Tödliche Wende	Nico Hofmann	Tilo Prückner, Walter Kreye, Claudine Wilde, Michael Mendl	Crime	
Ein tödliches Vergehen	Tony Randel	Marijam Agischewa, Jan Niklas, Birgit Doll, Diana Körner	Thriller	
Tote sterben niemals aus	Jürgen Goslar	Götz George	Comedy	
The Tourist	Urs Egger	Christoph Waltz, Dominic Raacke, Leslie Malton	Thriller	
Die Traumnummer – Die Hotline zum Glück	Hans-Jürgen Tögel	Ingo Naujoks, Kerstin Draeger, Manou Lubowski	Comedy	
Eine unmögliche Hochzeit	Horst Johann Sczerba	Maria Schrader, Dennenesch Zoudé, Rufus Beck	Comedy	a.k.a. An Impossible Marriage
The Venus Killer	Dominique Othenin-Girard	Katja Flint, Hannes Jaenicke	Thriller	
Das verletzte Lächeln	Andreas Gruber	Natja Brunckhorst, Rainer Egger	Drama	a.k.a. The Injured Smile
Walking and Talking	Nicole Holofcener	Catherine Keener, Anne Heche, Todd Field, Liev Schreiber, Kevin Corrigan, Vincent Pastore, Randall Batinkoff, Joseph Siravo, Allison Janney	Comedy	French-German-British-American co-production
Warshots	Heiner Stadler	Herbert Knaup	Drama	a.k.a. Kriegsbilder
Weibsbilder	Leon Boden	Lydia Andréï, Andrea Schieffer	Comedy	
Wer anhält stirbt	Olaf Kaiser, Alexander Ris	Corinna Harfouch, Nina Hoger, Michael Kind, Max Herbrechter	Thriller	
Werner: Eat My Dust!!!	Gerhard Hahn	—N/a	Animated	a.k.a. Werner – Das muß kesseln!!! a.k.a. Werner – Das muss kesseln!!! Most popular German film of the year (and second overall) with 4.9 million admissions
Willi und die Windzors	Hape Kerkeling	Hape Kerkeling, Brigitte Mira, Irm Hermann, Ludger Pistor	Comedy	
Workaholic	Sharon von Wietersheim	Christiane Paul, Tobias Moretti, Ralf Bauer	Comedy	
You Are Not Alone: The Roy Black Story	Peter Keglevic	Christoph Waltz, Jenny Schily, Mariella Ahrens	Biography, Music	
Zwei Leben hat die Liebe	Peter Timm	Christiane Paul, Klaus J. Behrendt	Drama	
Zwei vom gleichen Schlag	Konrad Sabrautzky	Claudia Michelsen, Petra Kleinert, Sebastian Koch, Walter Kreye, Ivan Desny	Crime comedy	

== 1997 ==
Title	Director	Cast	Genre	Notes
2½ Minuten	Rolf Schübel	Wanja Mues, Julia Brendler, Bibiana Beglau, Laura Tonke	Drama	a.k.a. Zweieinhalb Minuten
4 Geschichten über 5 Tote	Lars Büchel	Annemarie Marks-Rocke, Hannes Thanheiser, Sibylle Brunner, Andreas Kunze, Lena Sabine Berg	Anthology	a.k.a. Vier Geschichten über fünf Tote
14 Days to Life	Roland Suso Richter	Kai Wiesinger, Michael Mendl, Sylvia Leifheit, Marek Włodarczyk, Katharina Meinecke, Axel Milberg, Peter Fitz, Axel Pape	Thriller	a.k.a. 14 Tage lebenslänglich
The 120 Days of Bottrop	Christoph Schlingensief	Helmut Berger, Margit Carstensen, Irm Hermann, Udo Kier, Volker Spengler	Comedy	
Agentenfieber ... oder Wie betrügt man seine Frau	Bernhard Stephan	Andrea Sawatzki, Jürgen Heinrich, Peter Simonischek, Petra Kleinert	Comedy	a.k.a. Agentenfieber ... oder Wie betrüge ich meine Frau
Appartement für einen Selbstmörder	Kaspar Heidelbach	Christoph M. Ohrt, Katja Flint, Marijam Agischewa	Thriller	
Der Ausbruch	Mark Schlichter	Corinna Harfouch, Peter Lohmeyer, Ulrich Noethen, Heinz Hoenig, Burkhard Driest	Crime	
Ausgerastet	Hanno Brühl	Katharina Schüttler, Roman Knižka, Peter Kremer	Drama	
Die Babysitterin – Schreie aus dem Kinderzimmer	Michael Keusch	Catherine Flemming, Dorkas Kiefer, Ralph Herforth, Francis Fulton-Smith	Thriller	
Bandagistenglück	Maria Teresa Camoglio	Jule Ronstedt, Jasmin Tabatabai, Florian Lukas	Comedy	
Bandits	Katja von Garnier	Katja Riemann, Jasmin Tabatabai, Nicolette Krebitz, Jutta Hoffmann	Crime comedy, Music	
Ballermann 6	Tom Gerhardt, Gernot Roll	Tom Gerhardt, Hilmi Sözer	Comedy	
Beast in the Family	Gus Trikonis	Diana Frank, Arthur Brauss, Sunnyi Melles, Siemen Rühaak, Beate Jensen	Thriller	a.k.a. Insel der Furcht
Berlin – Moskau	Wolfgang F. Henschel	Muriel Baumeister, Michael Roll, Günter Lamprecht, Hilmar Thate, Uwe Kockisch	Thriller	
Betrogen – Eine Ehe am Ende	Dietrich Haugk	Gudrun Landgrebe, Hanns Zischler	Thriller	
Blutige Scheidung – Mein Mann läuft Amok	Manuel Siebenmann	Susanne Lothar, Ulrich Tukur, Annett Renneberg, Martin Semmelrogge	Thriller	
Broken Peace	Jörg Grünler	Uwe Bohm, Felix Eitner, Herbert Knaup	Thriller, War	a.k.a. Die Friedensmission – 10 Stunden Angst
Brothers and Sisters	Thomas Arslan	Tamer Yiğit, Kool Savas, Serpil Turhan	Drama	a.k.a. Kardeşler a.k.a. Geschwister
Buddies	Roland Suso Richter	Jürgen Vogel, Gregor Törzs, Pierre Besson, Aglaia Szyszkowitz, Nele Mueller-Stöfen, Lisa Martinek	Crime	
Bus 152	Richard Huber	Hannes Jaenicke, Stefan Jürgens, Doris Kunstmann	Disaster	a.k.a. The Death Bus
Busenfreunde	Thomas Berger	Jan Josef Liefers, Ulrich Noethen, Stefan Reck, Jennifer Nitsch, Hans Werner Meyer	Comedy	
Butterfly Feelings	Peter Patzak	Hannelore Elsner, Sissy Höfferer, Judy Winter	Comedy	
Calculated Risk	Michael Kennedy	Hannes Jaenicke, Karoline Eichhorn	Thriller	
Champagne and Chamomile Tea	Marijan David Vajda	Andrea Sawatzki, Nadja Tiller, Herbert Herrmann, Oliver Stritzel, Claudine Wilde	Comedy	a.k.a. Champagner und Kamillentee
Changing Skins	Andreas Dresen	Susanne Bormann, Fabian Busch, Otto Mellies	Drama	a.k.a. Raus aus der Haut
Die Chaos Queen	Christian von Castelberg	Veronica Ferres, Jan Josef Liefers, Gruschenka Stevens	Comedy	
Child Murder	Bernd Böhlich	Maria Schrader, Jürgen Vogel, Christian Redl, Francis Fulton-Smith	Crime	
Christmas Fever	Paul Harather	Uwe Ochsenknecht, Barbara Auer	Comedy	
Code Red	Carlo Rola	Hannes Jaenicke, Iris Berben, Blixa Bargeld, Ben Becker, Michael Mendl	Thriller	a.k.a. Die sieben Feuer des Todes a.k.a. Die 7 Feuer des Todes
Cologne's Finest	Ralf Huettner	Jürgen Tarrach, Oliver Korittke	Comedy	a.k.a. Die Musterknaben
Comedian Harmonists	Joseph Vilsmaier	Heino Ferch, Ulrich Noethen, Kai Wiesinger, Ben Becker, Max Tidof, Heinrich Schafmeister	Biography, Music	a.k.a. The Harmonists
Coming In	Thomas Bahmann	Steffen Wink, Franka Potente, Helmut Berger	Comedy	
Der Coup	Susanne Zanke	Heinz Schubert, Gisela Uhlen	Crime comedy	
Der Doppelgänger	Bernhard Stephan	Jürgen Heinrich, Katharina Müller-Elmau	Crime comedy	
The Cry of Love	Matti Geschonneck	Jürgen Prochnow, Matthias Schloo, Katharina Schüttler, Eva Mattes	Drama	
Daily Chicken	Lilly Grote	Ida von Recklinghausen, Luise von Recklinghausen, Angela Schanelec	Drama	
Davids Rache	Hartmut Griesmayr	Matthias Habich, Wolf Roth	Drama	
Death Game	Heinrich Breloer	Hans Brenner, Manfred Zapatka, Sebastian Koch, Ulrich Matthes	Docudrama	a.k.a. Dead Pool
The Deep End	Sigi Rothemund	Claudia Michelsen, Miroslav Nemec, Gruschenka Stevens	Thriller	a.k.a. A Murderous Summer
Dei Mudder sei Gesicht	Simon Mora, Hardy Strohn	Simon Mora, Jörg Öchsle, Tiho Slišković, Hardy Strohn	Crime comedy	
Dein Tod ist die gerechte Strafe	Wolfgang Mühlbauer	Jan Josef Liefers, Francis Fulton-Smith, Susanna Simon	Thriller	
Diamanten küßt man nicht	Ulrich Stark	Meret Becker	Crime comedy	
Doktor Knock	Dominik Graf	Gert Voss, Veronica Ferres, Sophie Rois	Comedy	a.k.a. Dr. Knock
Ende einer Leidenschaft	Niki Stein	Katja Flint, Sebastian Koch, Oliver Stritzel, Hanns Zischler, Ulrich Matschoss, Nina Petri	Thriller	
The Fearless Four	Eberhard Junkersdorf, Jürgen Richter, Michael Coldewey	—N/a	Animated	a.k.a. The Town Musicians of Bremen
Der Fischerkrieg	Klaus Gietinger	Hannes Thanheiser, Hans Heinz Moser	Drama	
Forever and Ever	Hark Bohm	Jeannette Arndt, Johanna ter Steege, Heinz Hoenig	Thriller	
Eine Frau nach Maß	Detlef Rönfeldt	Marianne Sägebrecht, Gérard Klein, Marie-France Pisier	Comedy	a.k.a. Une femme sur mesure. German-French co-production
Freier Fall	Christian Görlitz	Josef Bierbichler, Ulrich Tukur, Julia Stemberger, Florian Martens, Birgit Doll, Dieter Mann	Crime	
Gefangene der Liebe	Hans-Jürgen Tögel	Lena Stolze, Miroslav Nemec	Drama	
Gegen den Strom	Thorsten Näter	Ben Becker	Crime	
Geisterstunde – Fahrstuhl ins Jenseits	Rainer Matsutani, Sebastian Niemann	Horst Buchholz, Corinna Harfouch, Rolf Hoppe, Jan Niklas, Thomas Heinze, Christoph M. Ohrt, Anica Dobra, Eva Habermann	Horror, Anthology	
Gesche's Poison	Walburg von Waldenfels	Geno Lechner, Antje Westermann, Stefan Kurt, Margit Carstensen, Sylvester Groth	Historical thriller	
Gewagtes Spiel	Martin Gies	Sebastian Koch, Liane Forestieri, Nina Petri	Crime	
Gone Wrong	Peter Timm	Christiane Paul, Bernd Michael Lade	Comedy	a.k.a. Dumm gelaufen
Harald	Jürgen Egger	Heinrich Schafmeister, Martina Gedeck, Ingo Naujoks	Comedy, Science fiction	
Der Hauptmann von Köpenick	Frank Beyer	Harald Juhnke, Udo Samel, Elisabeth Trissenaar, Katharina Thalbach, Rolf Hoppe, Hark Bohm, Jürgen Hentsch, Sophie Rois	Comedy	a.k.a. The Captain of Köpenick a.k.a. The Captain from Köpenick
Heiß und kalt	Rolf von Sydow	Marijam Agischewa, Ann-Kathrin Kramer, Peter Sattmann, Patrick Winczewski, Saskia Valencia	Thriller	
Herz über Kopf	Hans-Jürgen Tögel	Carin C. Tietze, Miroslav Nemec, Rita Russek, Maria Furtwängler	Comedy	
Hilfe, meine Frau heiratet	Ulrich Stark	Sebastian Koch, Gesine Cukrowski, Axel Milberg	Comedy	
Hollister	Diethard Klante	Sebastian Koch, Claudia Michelsen, Susanne Lothar	Crime	
The Hours Before Dawn	Wolf Gremm	Gudrun Landgrebe, Susanne Lothar	Thriller	
Hunger: Addicted to Love	Dana Vávrová	Catherine Flemming, Kai Wiesinger, Christiane Hörbiger	Drama	a.k.a. Hunger: Longing for Love
In the Name of Innocence	Andreas Kleinert	Barbara Sukowa, Matthias Habich, Udo Samel	Drama	
It Happened in Broad Daylight	Nico Hofmann	Joachim Król, Axel Milberg	Thriller	a.k.a. The Pledge
Jack O'Lanterns	Christoph Kühn	Barbara Auer, Tobias Langhoff, Walo Lüönd, Christian Redl, Michael Kind	Thriller	a.k.a. The Darkness Experiment a.k.a. Irrlichter. Swiss-Austrian-German co-production
John Sinclair: Brides of the Devil	Klaus Knoesel	Florian Fitz	Horror	
Kabel und Liebe	Konrad Sabrautzky	Anne-Marie Bubke, Moritz Bleibtreu, Francis Fulton-Smith	Comedy	
Kalte Küsse	Carl Schenkel	Marie Bäumer, Jochen Nickel, Thomas Heinze, Karoline Eichhorn, Natja Brunckhorst, Angelica Domröse	Crime	
Klassenziel Mord	Michael Rowitz	Jennifer Nitsch, Bruno Eyron, Konrad Bösherz	Thriller	
Kleines Arschloch	Michael Schaack, Veit Vollmer	—N/a	Animated	
Knockin' on Heaven's Door	Thomas Jahn	Til Schweiger, Jan Josef Liefers, Moritz Bleibtreu	Action comedy	Entered into the 20th Moscow International Film Festival
Koma – Lebendig begraben	Uwe Janson	Antje Schmidt, Heino Ferch, Ulrike Panse	Thriller	
Die Konkurrentin	Dagmar Hirtz	Charlotte Schwab, Ann-Kathrin Kramer	Drama	
Lamorte	Xaver Schwarzenberger	Senta Berger, Christiane Hörbiger, Nicole Heesters, Gertraud Jesserer, Elfriede Irrall, Ulli Philipp	Drama	German-Austrian co-production
Lea	Ivan Fíla	Lenka Vlasakova, Christian Redl, Hanna Schygulla, Udo Kier	Drama	Czech-German-French co-production
Die letzte Rettung	Sigi Rothemund	Michael Degen, Johannes Brandrup, Iris Junik, Rosel Zech	Crime	
Liebe Lügen	Martin Walz	Meret Becker, Bernd Michael Lade, Ralph Herforth, Otto Sander, Peter Lohmeyer, Udo Samel	Comedy	a.k.a. Love Lies
Liebesfeuer	Hartmut Schoen	Regula Grauwiller, Jörg Schüttauf	Drama	
Life Is All You Get	Wolfgang Becker	Jürgen Vogel, Christiane Paul	Drama	a.k.a. Life Is a Construction Site. Entered into the 47th Berlin International Film Festival
Life Penalty	Sigi Rothemund	Jennifer Nitsch, Walter Sittler	Thriller	a.k.a. Life Imprisonment Is Not Enough
Little Dieter Needs to Fly	Werner Herzog		Documentary	German-British-French co-production
Living in Fear	Dagmar Damek	Ulrich Pleitgen, Eleonore Weisgerber, Hans Peter Hallwachs	Drama	
The Lost Daughter	Roger Cardinal	Richard Chamberlain, Helmut Griem, Susanna Simon, Michael Mendl, Suzanne von Borsody, Charles Edwin Powell, C. David Johnson, Patricia Drake, Julika Jenkins, Christiane Krüger, Sarah Lind	Thriller	Canadian-German-Swiss co-production
Mali	Rainer Wolffhardt	Christine Neubauer, Ernst Hannawald	Drama	a.k.a. Mali – Die Doktorbäuerin von Mariabrunn a.k.a. Amalie Hohenester
Maria	Einar Heimisson	Barbara Auer, Arnar Jónsson, Hinrik Ólafsson	Drama	Icelandic-German co-production
Mayday – Flug in den Tod	Chris Bould	Robert John Burke, Annabeth Gish, Heinz Hoenig	Drama	a.k.a. Entangled
May You Burn in Hell	Lothar Bellag	Ulrich Tukur, Dietmar Bär, Nina Hoger	Thriller	a.k.a. Ein Vater sieht rot
Mein ist die Rache	Thomas Jauch	Nadja Uhl, Ulrich Noethen, Lambert Hamel	Drama	
My Heart Is Mine Alone	Helma Sanders-Brahms	Lena Stolze	Biography	
Nackt im Cabrio	Sven Severin	Anica Dobra, Benjamin Sadler, Anna Thalbach, Detlev Buck, Oliver Korittke, Nadeshda Brennicke	Comedy	
Napoleon Fritz	Thorsten Näter	Klaus Löwitsch, Michael Gwisdek	Crime	
The Nephew	Gabriela Zerhau	Martina Gedeck	Comedy	
Nights, Gambled Away	Angeliki Antoniou	Jasmin Tabatabai, Vicky Volioti	Drama	
Not a Love Song	Jan Ralske	Lars Rudolph, Anna Thalbach, Matthias Freihof	Drama	
Null Risiko und reich	Wolf Vogel	Esther Schweins, Peter Fitz, Jockel Tschiersch, Jenny Schily, Ingrid van Bergen	Crime comedy	
Nur für eine Nacht	Michael Gutmann	Jakob von Moers, Ann-Kristin Leo, Leonard Lansink, Thomas Schmauser, Isabella Parkinson	Comedy	a.k.a. Just For One Night a.k.a. For One Night Only
Obsession	Peter Sehr	Daniel Craig, Heike Makatsch, Charles Berling	Drama	French-German co-production
Das Phantom von Bonn	Claus Strobel	Hermann Lause, Charles Brauer, Jürgen Schmidt, Loni von Friedl, Wanja Mues, Gustav Peter Wöhler	Mockumentary	
The Pharmacist	Rainer Kaufmann	Katja Riemann, Jürgen Vogel, Richy Müller, August Zirner, Isabella Parkinson, Andrea Sawatzki	Drama	a.k.a. Die Apothekerin
Portrait of a Judge	Norbert Kückelmann	Peter Simonischek, Robert Giggenbach, Michael Degen	Drama	
Post Mortem – Der Nuttenmörder	Wolfgang F. Henschel	Thomas Rühmann, Friedrich von Thun	Crime	
Premutos: The Fallen Angel	Olaf Ittenbach	Olaf Ittenbach, Ella Wellmann	Horror	
Prince Valiant	Anthony Hickox	Stephen Moyer, Katherine Heigl, Thomas Kretschmann, Edward Fox, Udo Kier, Joanna Lumley, Ron Perlman	Adventure	Irish-British-German co-production
Der Prinzgemahl	Vera Loebner	Robert Atzorn, Constanze Engelbrecht	Comedy	
Quiet Days in Hollywood	Josef Rusnak	Hilary Swank, Chad Lowe, Jake Busey, Natasha Gregson Wagner, Daryl Mitchell, Meta Golding	Drama	German-American co-production
The Rat	Martin Buchhorn	Matthias Habich, Sunnyi Melles, Dieter Laser, Peter Radtke	Drama	a.k.a. Die Rättin
A Rat's Tale	Michael F. Huse	Beverly D'Angelo, Lauren Hutton, Jerry Stiller	Family	a.k.a. Die Story von Monty Spinnerratz
Das Recht auf meiner Seite	Hartmut Griesmayr	Friedrich von Thun, Simone Thomalla, Ursela Monn	Drama	
Refuge	Christoph Schrewe	Thomas Kretschmann, Peter Lohmeyer, Bojana Golenac	Thriller	a.k.a. Unter die Haut
Reise in die Dunkelheit	Berthold Mittermayr	Peter Simonischek, Tatjana Blacher	Drama	
Rendezvous des Todes	Richard Huber	Karoline Eichhorn, Max Tidof, Saskia Vester, Dirk Bach	Thriller	
Rennlauf	Wolfram Paulus	Johanna Wölfl, Franka Potente	Drama, Sport	Austrian-German co-production
Röpers letzter Tag	Ralf Gregan	Günter Pfitzmann	Crime	
Rossini	Helmut Dietl	Götz George, Mario Adorf, Heiner Lauterbach, Veronica Ferres, Gudrun Landgrebe, Jan Josef Liefers, Joachim Król, Hannelore Hoger, Martina Gedeck	Comedy	a.k.a. Rossini oder Die mörderische Frage, wer mit wem schlief
Der rote Schakal	Hajo Gies	August Zirner	Drama	
Schlank bis in den Tod	Peter Wekwerth	Nina Kronjäger, Thomas Heinze	Drama	
Ein Schloß für Rita	Susanne Zanke	Jörg Schüttauf, Nina Kronjäger, Silvan-Pierre Leirich, Esther Schweins	Comedy	a.k.a. Ein Schloss für Rita
Schmutzige Wahrheit	Heidi Kranz	Günther Maria Halmer, Marion Mitterhammer, Christian Doermer	Drama	
School's Out	Achim Bornhak	Nic Romm, Christian Näthe, Oliver Bröcker, Stefanie Schmid, Joana Adu-Gyamfi, Anneke Kim Sarnau, Jasmin Schwiers	Drama	a.k.a. Die Nacht der Nächte – School's Out
The Scorpion	Dominik Graf	Heiner Lauterbach, Marek Harloff, Ulrich Noethen, Birge Schade, Petra Kleinert	Crime	
Seitensprung in den Tod	Gabriel Barylli	Gabriel Barylli, Katja Weitzenböck, Constanze Engelbrecht	Drama	
Die Sexfalle	Michael Keusch	Jennifer Nitsch, Ina Weisse, Jochen Horst, Ralph Herforth, Sylvia Kristel	Thriller	a.k.a. Die Lüge in deinen Augen
Shanghai 1937	Peter Patzak	Annie Girardot, Agnieszka Wagner, Nicholas Clay, Elliott Gould, Nigel Davenport	Drama, War	a.k.a. Hotel Shanghai a.k.a. Nanking Road. German-Austrian-Chinese co-production
Silent Night	Franz Xaver Bogner	Tobias Moretti, Heio von Stetten, Jörg Hube	Biography, Music	a.k.a. Das ewige Lied. German-Austrian co-production
Silvester Countdown	Oskar Roehler	Marie Zielcke, RP Kahl	Drama	
Simones Entscheidung	Ulrich Stark	Iris Berben, Peter Sattmann, Walter Kreye	Comedy	
Single Bells	Xaver Schwarzenberger	Martina Gedeck, Johanna von Koczian	Comedy	German-Austrian co-production
Sisters from Hell	Leon Boden	Esther Schweins, Stefanie Stappenbeck, Judy Winter	Horror	a.k.a. Rosenkavalier
Smilla's Sense of Snow	Bille August	Julia Ormond, Gabriel Byrne, Richard Harris, Vanessa Redgrave, Mario Adorf, Jürgen Vogel	Thriller	Danish-Swedish-German co-production
Spiel um dein Leben	Friedemann Fromm	Ben Becker, Natalia Wörner, Heino Ferch	Thriller	
Still Movin'	Niki Stein	Kai Wiesinger, Jochen Nickel, Sandra Speichert, Leonard Lansink	Comedy, Music	
Der stille Herr Genardy	Carlo Rola	Iris Berben, Matthias Fuchs	Thriller	
Die Superbullen	Otto Retzer	Wolfgang Fierek, Ottfried Fischer	Crime comedy	
Tiny Heroes	József Gémes, Jenő Koltai	—N/a	Animated comedy drama	German-Hungarian-American co-production
Tödlicher Duft	Jan Ruzicka	Sebastian Koch, Susanna Simon	Thriller	
Ein todsicheres Ding	Diethard Klante	Heinz Hoenig, Thomas Wingrich, Ferhat Kaleli, Fatima Genc, Erden Alkan, Meray Ülgen, Haydar Zorlu, Mohammad-Ali Behboudi, Erdoğan Egemenoğlu	Crime	
Trickser	Oliver Hirschbiegel	Dominique Horwitz, Eva Hassmann, Jochen Nickel	Crime	
Das Urteil	Oliver Hirschbiegel	Klaus Löwitsch, Matthias Habich	Drama	
Vergewaltigt – Die Wahrheit und andere Lügen	Martin Enlen	Barbara Auer, Jan Josef Liefers, Herbert Knaup, Katja Studt, Antje Schmidt	Crime	a.k.a. Raped – The Truth and Other Lies
Viel Spaß mit meiner Frau	Peter Welz	Jörg Schüttauf, Jörg Gudzuhn, Nina Franoszek, Gundula Köster	Comedy	
Virus X	Lutz Konermann	Leslie Malton, Peter Sattmann, Udo Wachtveitl	Thriller	
Der Wald	Hartmut Griesmayr	August Zirner	Crime	
Winterkind	Margarethe von Trotta	Susanna Simon, Lena Stolze, August Zirner	Drama	a.k.a. Winter's Child
Winter Sleepers	Tom Tykwer	Ulrich Matthes, Heino Ferch, Floriane Daniel, Marie-Lou Sellem, Josef Bierbichler	Drama	
Woanders scheint nachts die Sonne	Rolf Schübel	Julia Jäger, Sebastian Koch, Henry Arnold	Drama	
Zum Sterben schön	Friedemann Fromm	Andreas Patton, Natalia Wörner, Michaela May, Dirk Bach, Irm Hermann, Tilo Prückner, Jacques Breuer, Saskia Vester, Fred Stillkrauth	Comedy	
Zwischen den Feuern	Sigi Rothemund	Constanze Engelbrecht, Steffen Groth, Walter Kreye	Drama	

== 1998 ==
Title	Director	Cast	Genre	Notes
23	Hans-Christian Schmid	August Diehl	Drama	
36 Hours	Jörg Grünler	Johannes Brandrup, Uwe Bohm, Ulrich Mühe, Susanne Schäfer, Oscar Ortega Sánchez	Crime	a.k.a. 36 Stunden Angst
Abgehauen	Frank Beyer	Peter Lohmeyer, Karoline Eichhorn, Ann-Kathrin Kramer, Uwe Kockisch, Jürgen Hentsch, Ulrich Matthes, Hermann Lause	Biography, Docudrama	
Am I Beautiful?	Doris Dörrie	Franka Potente, Senta Berger, Heike Makatsch, Iris Berben, Maria Schrader, Anica Dobra, Gottfried John, Uwe Ochsenknecht	Comedy	
Andrea and Marie	Martin Enlen	Iris Berben, Hannelore Elsner, Michael Mendl	Drama	
Angel Express	RP Kahl	Eva Habermann, Laura Tonke, Ulrike Panse, Doreen Jacobi, Claudia Mehnert, Arno Frisch	Drama	
April Children	Yüksel Yavuz	Erdal Yıldız, Şerif Sezer	Drama	a.k.a. Children of April
Assignment Berlin	Tony Randel	Sammi Davis, Cliff Robertson, Paul Winfield, Dominic Raacke, Jan Niklas	Thriller	American-German co-production
Auch Männer brauchen Liebe	Gabriela Zerhau	Dominic Raacke, Sophie von Kessel, Uwe Ochsenknecht	Comedy	
Ein Bär für alle Fälle	Peter Adam	Heio von Stetten, Christina Plate, Ralf Richter	Crime	
Bertolt Brecht – Liebe, Revolution und andere gefährliche Sachen	Jutta Brückner	Peter Buchholz	Biography	
The Big Mambo	Michael Gwisdek	Corinna Harfouch, Michael Gwisdek, Jürgen Vogel	Comedy	a.k.a. Das Mambospiel. Entered into the 48th Berlin International Film Festival
Black Ice	Michael Gutmann	Günter Lamprecht, Gottfried John	Crime	a.k.a. Glatteis
Blutiger Ernst	Bernd Böhlich	Daniel Brühl, Nadja Uhl, Ken Duken, Walter Kreye, Joachim Kemmer	Crime	
Blutjunge Liebe – und keiner darf es wissen	Georg Kamienski	Simone Thomalla, David Winter, Julia Brendler, Klaus J. Behrendt	Drama	
Das Böse	Christian Görlitz	Ulrich Tukur, Annett Renneberg, Michael Kind, Edgar Selge, Burghart Klaußner	Crime	
Break Even	Eoin Moore	Andreas Schmidt, Tamara Simunovic, Kathleen Gallego Zapata	Drama	a.k.a. Plus Minus Null
The Bubi Scholz Story	Roland Suso Richter	Götz George, Benno Fürmann, Nicolette Krebitz, Alexandra Maria Lara, Angela Winkler, Elisabeth Trissenaar	Biography, Sport	
Caipiranha	Felix Dünnemann	Christine Kaufmann, Rainer Basedow, Katharina Thalbach, Thierry Van Werveke, Jasmin Gerat	Comedy	
Callboy	Susanne Hake	Aglaia Szyszkowitz, Markus Knüfken, Max Tidof	Comedy	
Der Campus	Sönke Wortmann	Heiner Lauterbach, Sandra Speichert, Martin Benrath, Axel Milberg, Armin Rohde, Hans-Michael Rehberg, Hermann Lause, Sibylle Canonica, Barbara Rudnik, Maren Kroymann	Comedy	
Candy	Christopher Roth	Nicolette Krebitz, Benno Fürmann, Marek Harloff, Roman Knižka, Vadim Glowna	Crime	
Cascadeur: The Amber Chamber	Hardy Martins	Hardy Martins, Regula Grauwiller, Heiner Lauterbach, Charles Régnier	Action thriller	
Die Cellistin	Sherry Hormann	Jeanette Hain, Richy Müller, Martin Feifel	Drama	
China Dream	Otto Alexander Jahrreiss	Jürgen Prochnow, Sarah Lam, Burt Kwouk	Drama	a.k.a. From China with Love
Clarissa	Jacques Deray	Maruschka Detmers, Tobias Moretti, Stéphane Freiss, Claude Rich	Drama, War	French-German co-production
Dating Game	Anno Saul	Claudia Messner, Herbert Knaup, Katharina Müller-Elmau, Jürgen Tarrach	Comedy	a.k.a. Blind Date – Flirt mit Folgen
Daybreak	Oliver Storz	Karoline Eichhorn, Stefan Kurt, Bruno Ganz	Drama	a.k.a. Gegen Ende der Nacht. German-Austrian-Swiss co-production
Die Healthy	Gert Steinheimer	Ulrich Mühe, Rolf Hoppe	Black comedy	a.k.a. Sterben ist gesünder
Der dreckige Tod	Michael Mackenroth	Heiner Lauterbach, Ina Weisse, Francis Fulton-Smith	Crime	
Drei Tage Angst	Klaus Knoesel	Esther Schweins, Ralf Bauer	Thriller	a.k.a. 3 Tage Angst
Drop Out – Nippelsuse schlägt zurück	Beatrice Manowski	Beatrice Manowski, Erdal Yıldız, Robert Viktor Minich	Crime	
Du hast mir meine Familie geraubt	Wolfgang Mühlbauer	Christine Neubauer, Helmut Zierl, Katharina Abt	Thriller	
Dunckel	Lars Kraume	Oliver Korittke, Sebastian Blomberg, Florian Lukas, Horst Buchholz, Isabella Parkinson, Teresa Harder, Nele Mueller-Stöfen, Vadim Glowna	Crime	
Die einzige Chance	Hartmut Griesmayr	Stefanie Stappenbeck, Moritz Bleibtreu	Drama	
The Eleventh Commandment	Rainer Bär	Vadim Glowna, Julia Jäger, Ulrike Kriener	Thriller	a.k.a. The 11th Commandment
Everything Will Be Fine	Angelina Maccarone	Kati Luzie Stüdemann, Chantal de Freitas, Aglaia Szyszkowitz	Comedy	
Fat World	Jan Schütte	Jürgen Vogel	Drama	
Fever	Xaver Schwarzenberger	Erwin Steinhauer, Gudrun Landgrebe, Herbert Knaup, Gregor Bloéb	Crime comedy	Austrian-German co-production
The Final Game	Sigi Rothemund	Christoph Waltz, Francis Fulton-Smith, Axel Milberg, Thure Riefenstein, Armin Rohde	Action thriller	a.k.a. Das Finale
Ein Fleisch und Blut	Käthe Niemeyer	Catherine Flemming, Petra Kleinert	Drama	
Four for Venice	Vivian Naefe	Aglaia Szyszkowitz, Heino Ferch, Gedeon Burkhard, Hilde Van Mieghem	Comedy	a.k.a. Two Women, Two Men a.k.a. 2 Männer, 2 Frauen – 4 Probleme!?
Frankfurt Millennium	Romuald Karmakar	Michael Degen, Manfred Zapatka, Jochen Nickel	Drama	a.k.a. Das Frankfurter Kreuz
Frau zu sein bedarf es wenig	Sigi Rothemund	Anica Dobra, Dieter Landuris, Jophi Ries	Comedy	
Freiwild	Dietmar Klein, Wolfgang Dickmann	Robert Atzorn, Gerit Kling, Jörg Gudzuhn, Peter Sattmann, Jutta Speidel	Thriller	
Gehetzt – Der Tod im Sucher	Joe Coppoletta	Hannes Jaenicke, Minh-Khai Phan-Thi, Francis Fulton-Smith	Thriller	a.k.a. Live Shot
Geliehenes Glück	Ben Verbong	Uwe Ochsenknecht, Maria Pia Calzone	Drama	
Gigolo – Bei Anruf Liebe	Michael Rowitz	Johannes Brandrup, Sonja Kirchberger, Katharina Böhm	Thriller	
Girl's Trap – Death Comes Online	Peter Ily Huemer	Alexandra Maria Lara, Thomas Kretschmann, Julia Richter	Thriller	a.k.a. Die Mädchenfalle – Der Tod kommt online
Das Glück wohnt hinterm Deich	Jürgen Bretzinger	Ulrich Pleitgen, Dominique Horwitz, Floriane Daniel	Comedy	
The Hairdresser and the Millionaire	Ulli Baumann	Eva Habermann, Leander Haußmann, Stefan Jürgens, Ivo Möller, Wilfried Baasner	Comedy	a.k.a. Die Friseuse und der Millionär
Der Handymörder	Hans Werner	Natalia Wörner, Jochen Horst, Rolf Hoppe, Hanns Zischler	Thriller	
Hard Rain	Mikael Salomon	Morgan Freeman, Christian Slater, Randy Quaid, Minnie Driver, Ed Asner	Action thriller	International co-production
Hauptsache Leben	Connie Walther	Renée Soutendijk, Huub Stapel, Hans Werner Meyer	Drama	
Heroes and Other Cowards	Dennis Satin	Carin C. Tietze, Ralf Bauer, Andreas Wisniewski	Comedy	
Herzbeben – Die Nacht, die alles veränderte	Thomas Jahn	Mark Keller, Sonsee Neu	Drama	
Hundred Years of Brecht	Ottokar Runze	Meret Becker, Udo Samel, Christian Redl, Hanne Hiob, Jürgen Hentsch	Anthology	a.k.a. Hundert Jahre Brecht a.k.a. 100 Jahre Brecht
Ich liebe eine Hure	Ernst Josef Lauscher	Alexandra Kamp, Uwe Bohm	Drama	
Ich schneide schneller	René Pollesch	Thomas Heinze, Nina Kronjäger	Drama	
Im Atem der Berge	Wolfgang Limmer	Gerd Silberbauer, Elisabeth Romano, Barbara Rudnik	Drama	
Im Fegefeuer der Lust	Michel Bielawa	Sigmar Solbach, Katja Weitzenböck	Thriller	
Im Innern des Bernsteins	Ilse Hofmann	Antje Schmidt, Rufus Beck, Ulrich Pleitgen, Timothy Peach, Elisabeth Wiedemann	Thriller	(Shot in 1995)
Jagdsaison	Karola Hattop	Minh-Khai Phan-Thi, Michael Mendl, Tobias Langhoff, Carolin Fink	Drama	
Jimmy the Kid	Wolfgang Dickmann	Herbert Knaup, Rufus Beck, Roman Knižka, Christiane Hörbiger	Crime comedy	
Just Married	Rudolf Thome	Laura Tonke, Herbert Fritsch, Valeska Hanel, Marquard Bohm, Johannes Herrschmann	Comedy	
Kai Rabe vs. the Vatican Killers	Thomas Jahn	Steffen Wink, Sandra Speichert, Klaus J. Behrendt	Comedy	
Der Kinderhasser	Maria Theresia Wagner	Marco Rima, Diether Krebs, Johanna Christine Gehlen	Comedy	a.k.a. Ein Kinderstar im Waisenhaus
Der kleine Dachschaden	Joachim Roering	Uwe Friedrichsen, Gaby Dohm	Comedy	
Der kleine Unterschied	Thomas Bohn	Horst Buchholz, Floriane Daniel, Gila von Weitershausen	Drama	
Krambambuli	Xaver Schwarzenberger	Tobias Moretti, Gabriel Barylli, Christine Neubauer	Drama	Austrian-German co-production
Der Kuss des Killers	Michael Rowitz	Sandra Speichert, Oliver Korittke, Henry Hübchen	Crime	
Letzte Chance für Harry	Karsten Wichniarz	Harald Juhnke, Günter Pfitzmann, Christiane Hörbiger, Gudrun Okras, Rolf Zacher	Comedy	
Liebe mich bis in den Tod	Michael Keusch	Christine Neubauer, Claude-Oliver Rudolph, Karl Michael Vogler, Louise Martini, Ralf Richter, Sabine von Maydell, Dietrich Adam	Drama	
Lieselotte	Johannes Fabrick	Vasiliki Kanakis-Roussi, Alexander Lutz	Drama	German-Austrian-French co-production
The Little Girl Who Fell from the Tree	Michael Bartlett	Dominique Horwitz, Floriane Daniel, Julia Jäger	Thriller	a.k.a. Ein tödliches Verhältnis
Lonny, der Aufsteiger	Tom Toelle	Roman Knižka, Anna Thalbach	Comedy	
Love Your Neighbour!	Detlev Buck	Moritz Bleibtreu, Heike Makatsch, Lea Mornar	Comedy	a.k.a. Love Your Female Neighbor!
Eine Lüge zuviel	Thomas Jacob	Bernd Herzsprung, Gila von Weitershausen, Alexandra Kamp	Thriller	a.k.a. Entangled
Macht	Miguel Alexandre	Katja Riemann, Peter Sattmann, Dietmar Schönherr, Nicole Heesters	Thriller	
Mammamia	Sandra Nettelbeck	Senta Berger, Christiane Paul, Peter Lohmeyer, Michael Mendl	Comedy	
Ein Mann fällt nicht vom Himmel	Sibylle Tafel	Roman Knižka, Katrin Bühring, Tamara Rohloff	Comedy	
Ein Mann stürzt ab	Heide Pils	Andreas Schmidt-Schaller, Katrin Sass, Cordelia Wege	Drama	
Me Boss, You Sneakers!	Hussi Kutlucan	Hussi Kutlucan, Özay Fecht	Comedy	
Mein Kind muss leben	Diethard Klante	Heinz Hoenig, Jürgen Hentsch	Drama	
Das merkwürdige Verhalten geschlechtsreifer Großstädter zur Paarungszeit	Marc Rothemund	Cosma Shiva Hagen, Christoph Waltz, Gudrun Landgrebe, Michaela May	Comedy	a.k.a. Love Scenes from Planet Earth a.k.a. Strange Behavior of Sexually Mature Urbanites at Mating Season
Meschugge	Dani Levy	Maria Schrader, Dani Levy, David Strathairn, Lynn Cohen, Nicole Heesters, Lukas Ammann	Thriller	a.k.a. The Giraffe. German-Swiss-American co-production
Midnight Flight	Chris Bould	Leslie Malton, Robert John Burke, Stephen McHattie, Giovanni Ribisi	Thriller	a.k.a. Alptraum im Airport
Das Miststück	Carlo Rola	Iris Berben, Hans-Michael Rehberg, Alexandra Neldel, Leon Boden, Christian Brückner	Crime	
Mortal Friends	Oliver Hirschbiegel	Heino Ferch, Tobias Moretti	Crime	a.k.a. Todfeinde
Mrs. Rettich, Czerni and I	Markus Imboden	Iris Berben, Martina Gedeck, Jeanette Hain, Olli Dittrich, Thomas Heinze, Dirk Bach	Comedy	a.k.a. Mrs. Rettich, Czerni and Me
Ms. Diamond	Michael Karen	Sandra Speichert, Thomas Kretschmann, Michael Mendl, Udo Kier	Crime	a.k.a. Die Diebin
Murderer Next Door	Axel de Roche	Katja Weitzenböck, Helmut Zierl	Thriller	a.k.a. Der Mörder in meinem Haus
Murderous Legacy	Peter Patzak	Christoph Waltz, Nadja Uhl, Rolf Hoppe, Ulrich Wildgruber, Maria Perschy	Crime	a.k.a. Murderous Inheritance
Night Time	Peter Fratzscher	Jan Josef Liefers, Marie Bäumer, Ulrich Mühe, Christoph Waltz, Peter Lohmeyer, Horst Krause	Thriller	a.k.a. Sieben Monde a.k.a. 7 Monde
Nina – Vom Kinderzimmer ins Bordell	Torsten C. Fischer	Marie Zielcke, Thomas Kretschmann, Udo Kier, Marek Harloff, Ingrid van Bergen	Drama	
One Step Too Far	Udo Witte	Gudrun Landgrebe, Heiner Lauterbach, Rolf Hoppe, Marion Mitterhammer	Thriller	a.k.a. Eine Sünde zuviel
Operation Noah	Achim Bornhak	Stephanie Philipp, Uwe Ochsenknecht, Hanns Zischler	Thriller	
Opernball	Urs Egger	Heiner Lauterbach, Franka Potente, Gudrun Landgrebe, Désirée Nosbusch, Richard Bohringer, Frank Giering, Caroline Goodall	Thriller	a.k.a. Opera Ball. Austrian-German co-production
Das Paar des Jahres	Olaf Kreinsen	Ellen ten Damme, Markus Knüfken, Markus Majowski	Comedy	
Palmetto	Volker Schlöndorff	Woody Harrelson, Elisabeth Shue, Gina Gershon, Rolf Hoppe, Chloë Sevigny	Crime	German-American co-production
Papa, ich hol' dich raus	Hartmut Griesmayr	Helmut Zierl, Christine Neubauer, Ivo Möller, Tilo Prückner	Crime	
Pauls Reise	René Heisig	Peter Lohmeyer, Niccolo Casagrande	Drama	a.k.a. Paul's Journey
Der Pirat	Bernd Schadewald	Jürgen Vogel, Christiane Paul, Laura Tonke, Peter Lohmeyer, Ulrike Kriener	Crime	
Places in Cities	Angela Schanelec	Sophie Aigner	Drama	Screened at the 1998 Cannes Film Festival
The Polar Bear	Til Schweiger	Til Schweiger, Karina Krawczyk, Benno Fürmann, Florian Lukas, Heiner Lauterbach	Crime	
Rache für mein totes Kind	Vivian Naefe	Susanna Simon, Hansa Czypionka, Christoph Waltz	Thriller	
Red as Blood	Markus Fischer	André Eisermann, Stefanie Stappenbeck, Rolf Hoppe, Ivan Desny	Crime	
Reise in die Nacht	Matti Geschonneck	Ulrike Kriener, Julia Brendler, Renan Demirkan, Emine Sevgi Özdamar, Tayfun Bademsoy	Thriller	a.k.a. Reise in die Nacht – Alptraum eines Sommers
Rhapsody in Blood	Uwe Janson	Katja Flint, Steffen Wink, Franziska Petri, Pinkas Braun, Manfred Zapatka	Thriller	a.k.a. Annas Fluch – Tödliche Gedanken
Rider of the Flames	Nina Grosse	Martin Feifel, Marianne Denicourt, Ulrich Matthes	Biography	a.k.a. Fire Rider
Der Rosenmörder	Matti Geschonneck	Natalia Wörner, Sebastian Koch, Christian Redl	Thriller	
Run Lola Run	Tom Tykwer	Franka Potente, Moritz Bleibtreu, Herbert Knaup, Nina Petri, Joachim Król, Heino Ferch	Thriller	a.k.a. Lola rennt. Official Submission for the 1998 Academy Awards; 1998 BAFTA Nominee; 1999 Independent Spirit Award Winner
Scent of Seduction	Bodo Fürneisen	Gedeon Burkhard, Nadja Uhl, Denise Virieux	Thriller	a.k.a. Gefährliche Lust – Ein Mann in Versuchung
Schalom, meine Liebe	Josef Rödl	Dominique Horwitz, Katja Weitzenböck, Hanna Azoulay Hasfari, Buddy Elias, Irm Hermann	Drama	
Scenes from the Sex War	Tobias Meinecke	Marita Marschall, Henry Hübchen	Comedy	a.k.a. Liebling, vergiss die Socken nicht!
Schlange auf dem Altar	Hans-Erich Viet	Armin Rohde, Joana Adu-Gyamfi, Edgar Selge	Comedy	
Schock – Eine Frau in Angst	Ben Verbong	Jennifer Nitsch, Christoph Waltz, Richy Müller, Herbert Knaup, Leslie Malton	Thriller	
The Sex Thief	Christian Petzold	Constanze Engelbrecht, Nele Mueller-Stöfen, Richy Müller	Crime	a.k.a. Die Beischlafdiebin
Short Sharp Shock	Fatih Akin	Mehmet Kurtuluş, Aleksandar Jovanovic, Adam Bousdoukos, Regula Grauwiller	Crime	a.k.a. Kurz und schmerzlos
Single sucht Nachwuchs	Uwe Janson	Heino Ferch, Ina Weisse, Monica Bleibtreu	Comedy	
The Sleeper	Roman Kuhn	Gesine Cukrowski, Michael Mendl, Axel Milberg	Thriller	a.k.a. Die Schläfer
Solo for Clarinet	Nico Hofmann	Götz George, Corinna Harfouch, Barbara Auer, Barbara Rudnik, Katharina Thalbach	Thriller	
Something to Believe In	John Hough	William McNamara, Tom Conti, Maria Pitillo	Drama	British-German co-production
Sommergewitter	Dagmar Damek	Maruschka Detmers, Michael von Au	Drama	
Sugar for the Beast	Markus Fischer	Matthias Habich, Christiane Paul, Rolf Hoppe, Gudrun Landgrebe	Thriller	
Supersingle	Sharon von Wietersheim	Ann-Kathrin Kramer, Regula Grauwiller, Heio von Stetten	Comedy	
Tarzan and the Lost City	Carl Schenkel	Casper Van Dien, Jane March	Adventure	German-American-Australian co-production
Teneriffa – Tag der Rache	Peter Deutsch	Michael Mendl, Barbara Wussow, Christian Kohlund	Thriller	
Terror in the Mall	Norberto Barba	Rob Estes, David Soul, Kai Wiesinger	Thriller	American-German co-production
Tiger-Stripe Woman Waits for Tarzan	Rudolf Thome	Herbert Fritsch, Cora Frost, Valeska Hanel, Irm Hermann, Rüdiger Vogler	Science fiction	
Tod auf Amrum	Konrad Sabrautzky	Christian Berkel, Andrea Sawatzki	Thriller	
Tödliche Diamanten	Celino Bleiweiß	Heiner Lauterbach, Jan Niklas, Miroslav Nemec, Erwin Steinhauer, Lara Joy Körner, Christina Plate	Crime	German-Austrian co-production
Tödliches Alibi	Hartmut Griesmayr	Uwe Ochsenknecht, Leslie Malton, Alexander Radszun	Thriller	
Totalschaden	Thorsten Näter	Dieter Pfaff, Katharina Thalbach, Markus Majowski	Comedy	a.k.a. The Write-Off
Trains'n'Roses	Peter Lichtefeld	Joachim Król, Peter Lohmeyer, Outi Mäenpää	Comedy	a.k.a. Train Birds. German-Finnish co-production
Trial by Fire	Janek Rieke	Lisa Martinek, Janek Rieke	Comedy	a.k.a. The Hardship Test
The Trio	Hermine Huntgeburth	Götz George, Christian Redl, Jeanette Hain, Felix Eitner	Crime	
Trouville Beach	Michael Hofmann	Boris Aljinovic, Antje Westermann	Comedy	
Tut mir leid wegen gestern	Anna Justice	Oliver Korittke, Katja Studt	Comedy	
Ufos über Waterlow	Zoltan Spirandelli	Uwe Steimle, Thorsten Nindel, Andrea Sawatzki, Nadja Uhl	Comedy	
Ultimate Trespass	Martin Enlen	Iris Berben, Katja Studt, Antje Schmidt	Drama	a.k.a. Vergewaltigt – Eine Frau schlägt zurück
Und alles wegen Mama	Hermine Huntgeburth	Uwe Ochsenknecht, Eva Mattes, Frank Giering, Jochen Nickel, Andrea Sawatzki	Crime comedy	
Die unerwünschte Zeugin	Maria Theresia Wagner	Jo Kern, Marcus Mittermeier, Veronika Fitz, Fred Stillkrauth, Christine Neubauer	Crime drama	
Eine ungehorsame Frau	Vivian Naefe	Veronica Ferres, Michael Degen, Katharina Müller-Elmau	Drama	
Die Unschuld der Krähen	Horst Johann Sczerba	Joachim Król, Nina Petri	Thriller	a.k.a. Murder Always Gathers Momentum
Unsere Kinder! – Verschollen im Urlaub	Sigi Rothemund	Constanze Engelbrecht, Uwe Kockisch, Judith Richter, Max von Thun	Adventure	
Verfolgt! – Mädchenjagd auf der Autobahn	Kaspar Heidelbach	Liane Forestieri, Tim Bergmann	Thriller	
Das vergessene Leben	Claudia Prietzel	Inge Meysel, Florian Lukas, Katrin Sass	Drama	
Vicky's Nightmare	Peter Keglevic	Katja Flint, Christoph Waltz, Nina Kronjäger	Thriller	
Visioner	Elodie Keene	Jeffrey Meek, Nina Franoszek, Matthias Habich, Patricia Millardet	Science Fiction	a.k.a. Babyraub – Kinder fremder Mächte. American-German co-production
Vital Signs	Dieter Kehler	Maria Furtwängler, Carol Campbell, Ursula Buschhorn	Drama	a.k.a. Herzflimmern
Vorübergehend verstorben	Sigi Rothemund	Karoline Eichhorn, Michael Reale	Thriller	
Walli, die Eisfrau	Wilhelm Engelhardt	Stefan Kurt, Claudine Wilde	Comedy	
Weekend mit Leiche	Sven Severin	Anica Dobra, Uwe Ochsenknecht, Oliver Korittke	Crime comedy	
Widows	Sherry Hormann	Ornella Muti, Katja Flint, Eva Mattes, Uwe Ochsenknecht, Martin Benrath, Heino Ferch	Comedy	
Wie eine Spinne im Netz	Heidi Kranz	Simone Thomalla, Dieter Kirchlechner, Mathieu Carrière, Udo Wachtveitl	Drama	
Wie stark muß eine Liebe sein	Peter Deutsch	Bobby Hosea, Michèle Marian, Margaret Avery, Helmut Zierl, Dorothé Reinoss, Günther Kaufmann	Drama	a.k.a. Wie stark muss eine Liebe sein
Wings of Hope	Werner Herzog		Documentary	
Women Don't Lie	Michael Juncker	Jennifer Nitsch, Martina Gedeck, Dominique Horwitz, Peter Sattmann	Comedy	a.k.a. Good Girls Don't Lie
The Wound	Yılmaz Arslan	Yelda Reynaud	Drama	a.k.a. Yara a.k.a. Seelenschmerz. German-Turkish-Swiss-Austrian co-production
Wrongfully Accused	Pat Proft	Leslie Nielsen, Richard Crenna, Kelly Le Brock, Michael York	Comedy	American-German co-production
Zerrissene Herzen	Urs Odermatt	Suzanne von Borsody, Nadja Uhl, Burghart Klaußner, Ernst Jacobi, Michael Gwisdek	Drama	

== 1999 ==
Title	Director	Cast	Genre	Notes
Absolute Giganten	Sebastian Schipper	Frank Giering, Florian Lukas, Antoine Monot, Jr., Julia Hummer	Comedy	a.k.a. Gigantic
After the Truth	Roland Suso Richter	Kai Wiesinger, Götz George	Drama	a.k.a. Nichts als die Wahrheit
Aimée & Jaguar	Max Färberböck	Maria Schrader, Juliane Köhler, Johanna Wokalek, Heike Makatsch, Elisabeth Degen, Detlev Buck	Romantic drama, War	a.k.a. Aimée and Jaguar a.k.a. Aimée und Jaguar. 1999 Golden Globe Nominee; Official Submission for the Academy Awards in 1999; Lesbian love story set in World War II
Alles Bob!	Otto Alexander Jahrreiss	Martina Gedeck, Gregor Törzs, Miriam Lahnstein, Christiane Krüger	Comedy	a.k.a. It's All Bob a.k.a. All About Bob
Am Anfang war der Seitensprung	Hartmut Griesmayr	Simone Thomalla, Heidelinde Weis, Stephan Schwartz	Comedy	
Amor – Todesspiel aus Liebe	Holger Barthel	Katja Weitzenböck, Klaus Grünberg, Alexander Held, Dietrich Hollinderbäumer, August Schmölzer	Thriller	
Angel of Death	Markus Fischer	Ulrich Mühe, Cosma Shiva Hagen	Thriller	
Angels' Sin	Wolf Gremm	Gudrun Landgrebe, Jens Eulenberger	Thriller	a.k.a. The Sin of the Angels
Die Angst in meinem Herzen	Joseph Orr	Sigmar Solbach, Claude-Oliver Rudolph, Anke Sevenich, Anja Knauer	Crime	
Annaluise & Anton	Caroline Link	Elea Geissler, Max Felder, Meret Becker, Juliane Köhler, August Zirner, Sylvie Testud, Benno Fürmann	Family	a.k.a. Annaluise and Anton a.k.a. Pünktchen und Anton
Anthropophagous 2000	Andreas Schnaas	Andreas Schnaas	Horror	
Antrag vom Ex	Sven Unterwaldt	Julia Jäger, Eckhard Preuß, Dorkas Kiefer, Heinrich Schmieder	Comedy	
Apokalypso	Martin Walz	Armin Rohde, Andrea Sawatzki	Thriller	
At Fifty Men Kiss Differently	Margarethe von Trotta	Senta Berger, Ulrich Pleitgen, Hans Peter Hallwachs, Konstantin Wecker, Martin Feifel, Eleonore Weisgerber	Comedy	
Atemlose Liebe	Wilma Kottusch	Doreen Jacobi, Stephan Ullrich, Silvan-Pierre Leirich	Drama	
Die Bademeister	Martin Walz	Michael "Bully" Herbig, Hilmi Sözer, Dorkas Kiefer	Comedy	
Bang Boom Bang	Peter Thorwarth	Oliver Korittke, Markus Knüfken, Ralf Richter, Diether Krebs, Martin Semmelrogge, Alexandra Neldel	Comedy	
Bangkok – Ein Mädchen verschwindet	Thorsten Näter	Ulrich Noethen, Bettina Kupfer, Axel Milberg	Thriller	
The Beast in the Lake	Richard Huber	Barbara Rudnik	Horror	a.k.a. The Beast in Lake Constance
A Big Job	Bernd Schadewald	Jürgen Vogel, Richy Müller, Katja Flint, Fiona Coors	Crime	a.k.a. Ein großes Ding
Bis zum Horizont und weiter	Peter Kahane	Wolfgang Stumph, Corinna Harfouch, Nina Petri, Sissi Perlinger, Jörg Schüttauf	Crime	a.k.a. To the Horizon and Beyond
Bitter Innocence	Dominik Graf	Elmar Wepper, Michael Mendl, Laura Tonke, Andrea L'Arronge	Thriller	
Biikenbrennen – Der Fluch des Meeres	Sebastian Niemann	Christoph M. Ohrt, Anja Kling	Horror	
Bill Diamond	Wolfgang Panzer	Kati Tastet, Marek Kondrat, Ettore Cella	Drama	Swiss-German-French co-production
Die blaue Kanone	Otto Retzer	Ottfried Fischer, Fritz Wepper, Verona Feldbusch, Dennenesch Zoudé, Wolfgang Fierek, Ingrid Steeger, Arthur Brauss	Crime comedy	
Die Blendung – Verrat aus Liebe	Ralph Bohn	Jochen Horst, Liane Forestieri, Jürgen Hentsch	Thriller	
The Blond Baboon	Thomas Jauch	Jürgen Prochnow, Karoline Eichhorn, Michael Mendl, Götz Otto	Crime	
Bodyguard – Dein Leben in meiner Hand	Wilhelm Engelhardt	Aglaia Szyszkowitz, Uwe Ochsenknecht	Thriller	
Bombs Under Berlin	Joe Coppoletta	Christiane Paul, Tim Bergmann, Christian Oliver, Rüdiger Vogler, Reiner Schöne	Thriller	a.k.a. Götterdämmerung – Morgen stirbt Berlin
Die Braut	Egon Günther	Veronica Ferres, Herbert Knaup, Christoph Waltz, Sibylle Canonica, Friedrich-Wilhelm Junge	Biography	a.k.a. The Mask of Desire
Buena Vista Social Club	Wim Wenders		Documentary, Music	Academy Award Nominee for Best Documentary
The Call Girl	Peter Keglevic	Floriane Daniel, André Hennicke	Thriller	
Captive in Yemen	Peter Patzak	Peter Maffay, Roman Knižka, Claudine Wilde	Thriller	
Castor	Jörg Lühdorff	Jörg Schüttauf, Claudia Michelsen	Thriller	a.k.a. Der Todeszug
Chain of Evidence	Michael Rowitz	Klaus Löwitsch, Jennifer Nitsch	Thriller	a.k.a. Ein Mann wie eine Waffe
Comeback für Freddy Baker	Matti Geschonneck	Mario Adorf, Tilo Prückner, Felix Eitner, Aglaia Szyszkowitz, Puhdys, Dieter Landuris, Ernst Stankovski	Comedy, Music	
Countdown at Sea	Mark von Seydlitz	Ralf Bauer, Udo Wachtveitl	Thriller	a.k.a. Die Todesfahrt der MS SeaStar
Cross-Eyed	Rudolf Steiner	Scott Cohen, Kristen Wilson	Thriller	American-German co-production
The Cry of the Butterfly	Frank Strecker	Tito Larriva, Marek Harloff, Marie Zielcke, Hannelore Elsner, Dietmar Schönherr, Ralf Richter	Drama	
Curiosity & the Cat	Christian Alvart	Konstantin Graudus, Nadeshda Brennicke	Thriller	a.k.a. Curiosity and the Cat
Days of Darkness	Margarethe von Trotta	Suzanne von Borsody, Stefanie Stappenbeck	Drama	a.k.a. Dark Days
Dealer	Thomas Arslan	Tamer Yiğit, İdil Üner	Crime drama	
Death Run	Curt Faudon	Thomas Heinze, Rupert Frazer, Carin C. Tietze, Heio von Stetten	Thriller	a.k.a. Mörderische Abfahrt – Skitour in den Tod
The Devil and Ms. D	Bernd Eichinger	Til Schweiger, Corinna Harfouch, Thomas Heinze, Christine Neubauer	Drama, Fantasy	a.k.a. The Great Bagarozy
Doggy Dog – Eine total verrückte Hundeentführung	Klaus Knoesel	Oliver Korittke, Jenny Elvers, Jan-Gregor Kremp, Alexandra Neldel	Crime comedy	
Doppeltes Dreieck	Torsten C. Fischer	Barbara Rudnik, Max Tidof, Helmut Berger, Elisabeth Trissenaar, André Hennicke, Andrea Sawatzki, Jürgen Hentsch	Thriller	
Doppeltes Spiel mit Anne	Donald Kraemer	Nele Mueller-Stöfen, Thure Riefenstein, Elke Sommer	Crime comedy	
Dr. Robert Schumann, Teufelsromantiker	Christine Soetbeer, Ernst-Günter Seibt	Michael Maertens, Bettina Kurth, Will Quadflieg	Biography, Music	
Dragonland	Florian Gärtner	Marek Harloff	Drama	
Drei Gauner, ein Baby und die Liebe	Vera Loebner	Harald Juhnke, Dieter Landuris, Anja Franke	Crime comedy	
Einfach raus	Peter Vogel	Ulrich Mühe, Susanne Lothar, Cosma Shiva Hagen, Fabian Busch, Inga Busch	Drama	
The Einstein of Sex	Rosa von Praunheim	Kai Schumann, Friedel von Wangenheim, Ben Becker, Otto Sander, Wolfgang Völz, Meret Becker	Biography	
Ein einzelner Mord	Karl Fruchtmann	David Cesmeci, Christian Doermer, August Schmölzer, Monica Bleibtreu	War	
Der Elefant in meinem Bett	Mark Schlichter	Peter Lohmeyer, Oliver Korittke, Aglaia Szyszkowitz, Antje Schmidt, Horst Krause	Family	
Else: A Passionate Woman	Egon Günther	Katja Riemann	Drama	a.k.a. Else: Story of a Passionate Woman a.k.a. You Are Not Like Other Mothers
Enlightenment Guaranteed	Doris Dörrie	Uwe Ochsenknecht, Gustav Peter Wöhler	Drama	
Die Entführung	Peter Patzak	Götz George, Muriel Baumeister, Birgit Doll	Thriller	
Fake – Die Fälschung	Jörg Schlasius	Heribert Czerniak, Martin Umbach, Christian Pätzold, Herbert Feuerstein	Crime	
Fatal Online Affair	Michael Karen	Katja Woywood, Peter Sattmann, Katja Riemann	Thriller	a.k.a. Verführt – Eine gefährliche Affäre
Fight Club	David Fincher	Brad Pitt, Edward Norton, Helena Bonham Carter, Meat Loaf, Jared Leto	Drama	American-German co-production
Flames of Death	Curt Faudon	Heino Ferch, Natalia Wörner, Axel Milberg	Thriller	a.k.a. Der Feuerteufel. Austrian-German co-production
Fresh Produce	Paul Harather	Christine Neubauer, Christine Buchegger, Max von Thun, Heio von Stetten	Drama	a.k.a. Frische Ware
From the Depths to the Heights	Matti Geschonneck	Marianne Sägebrecht	Drama	a.k.a. Ganz unten, ganz oben
Gangster	Volker Einrauch	Frank Giering, Laura Tonke, Christian Redl, Stefan Kurt	Crime	
Gefährliche Wahrheit	Bodo Fürneisen	Barbara Rudnik, Michael Mendl, Hans Werner Meyer	Crime	
Das Gelbe vom Ei	Lars Becker	Moritz Bleibtreu, Meret Becker, Heike Makatsch	Comedy	
Gierig	Oskar Roehler	Jasmin Tabatabai, Richy Müller, Gregor Törzs	Drama	a.k.a. Lust for Life a.k.a. Greedy
'Ne günstige Gelegenheit	Gernot Roll	Benno Fürmann, Armin Rohde, Rebecca Immanuel, Herbert Knaup, Ellen ten Damme, Hark Bohm	Crime comedy	a.k.a. A Good Opportunity
Gloomy Sunday	Rolf Schübel	Joachim Król, Erika Marozsán, Stefano Dionisi, Ben Becker	World War II drama	a.k.a. Ein Lied von Liebe und Tod. German-Hungarian co-production
Hans Warns: My 20th Century	Gordian Maugg	Shenja Lacher	Adventure	
The Harpist	Hansjörg Thurn	Geraldine O'Rawe, Christien Anholt, Stephen McGann, Colin Baker	Drama	a.k.a. Die Harfenspielerin. British-German co-production
Heimlicher Tanz	Angeliki Antoniou	Uschi Glas, Michael von Au, Dietrich Hollinderbäumer	Comedy	
Heroes Like Us	Sebastian Peterson	Daniel Borgwardt, Gojko Mitić, Achim Mentzel	Comedy	
Herzlos	Lutz Konermann	Leslie Malton, Tim Bergmann, Henry Hübchen, Julia Brendler	Thriller	a.k.a. Heartless
Hin und weg	Hanno Brühl	Daniel Brühl, Katharina Schüttler	Crime	
Der Hochstapler	Martin Buchhorn	Jan Fedder, Ulrike Folkerts, Gerd Baltus	Comedy	
Holgi	Günter Knarr	Konstantin Prochorowski, Marco Girnth, Eva Herzig	Black comedy	a.k.a. Holgi – Der böseste Junge der Welt
Holstein Lovers	Uwe Janson	Nadja Tiller, Günther Schramm	Comedy	
Ich bin kein Mann für eine Frau	Michael Lähn	Robert Atzorn, Christine Neubauer, Sylvia Haider, Patrizia Moresco	Comedy	
Ich habe Nein gesagt	Markus Imboden	Martina Gedeck, Jörg Schüttauf, Dieter Pfaff	Drama	
Ich liebe meine Familie, ehrlich	Stefan Lukschy	Suzanne von Borsody, Rosemarie Fendel, Leonard Lansink, Wolke Hegenbarth	Comedy	a.k.a. I Love My Family, I Really Do!
Ich schenk dir meinen Mann	Karola Hattop	Hannelore Elsner, Ursula Karven, Jürgen Heinrich, Rosemarie Fendel	Comedy	
Ich wünsch dir Liebe	Wiktor Grodecki	Dana Vávrová, Marianne Sägebrecht, Hardy Krüger Jr.	Drama	
In Heaven	Michael Bindlechner	Sylvie Testud, Xaver Hutter, Merab Ninidze	Drama	German-Austrian co-production
Jack's Baby	Jan Josef Liefers	Veronica Ferres, Jan Josef Liefers, Wigald Boning, Bernd Michael Lade	Comedy	
Jew-boy Levi	Didi Danquart	Bruno Cathomas, Caroline Ebner, Ulrich Noethen, Martina Gedeck	Drama	a.k.a. Viehjud Levi. German-Swiss-Austrian co-production
Kein Mann für eine Nacht	Thomas Bohn	Floriane Daniel, Max Tidof, Sky du Mont, Ingolf Lück	Comedy	
Kismet	Andreas Thiel	Steffen Wink, Fatih Akin, Jule Ronstedt, Axel Milberg	Thriller	a.k.a. Black Souls
Das komabrutale Duell	Heiko Fipper	Heiko Fipper, Mike Hoffman, Stefan Hoft	Horror	
Der Kopp	Michael Mackenroth	Dietmar Schönherr, Alexandra Kamp, Björn Casapietra, Benjamin Sadler, Sabine Vitua	Crime	
The Last Bomb	Hans Horn	Jens Neuhaus, Regula Grauwiller, Horst Janson, Hans Korte	Thriller	a.k.a. Der Bunker – Eine todsichere Falle
Last Minute Kasbah	Michael Wenning	Felix Eitner, Saïd Taghmaoui, Floriane Daniel, Bernd Michael Lade	Thriller	a.k.a. Urlaub im Orient – Und niemand hört dein Schreien
Late Show	Helmut Dietl	Thomas Gottschalk, Harald Schmidt, Veronica Ferres, Jasmin Tabatabai	Comedy	
Latin Lover	Oskar Roehler	Marie Bäumer, Thomas Heinze, Leon Boden	Drama	
Die letzte Chance	Erwin Keusch	Michael Mendl, Jennifer Nitsch, Karl Michael Vogler	Drama	
Lieber böser Weihnachtsmann	Ben Verbong	Rufus Beck, Miroslav Nemec, Jennifer Nitsch	Thriller	
Lola and Billy the Kid	Kutluğ Ataman	Gandi Mukli, Baki Davrak, Erdal Yıldız	Drama	a.k.a. Lola und Bilidikid
Long Hello and Short Goodbye	Rainer Kaufmann	Nicolette Krebitz, Marc Hosemann, Katja Riemann, Sunnyi Melles, Axel Milberg, Dietrich Hollinderbäumer	Crime	a.k.a. Long Hello & Short Goodbye
Das Mädchen aus der Torte	Peter Weck	Rainhard Fendrich, Ursula Buschhorn, Friedrich von Thun, Gudrun Landgrebe, Marion Mitterhammer, Max Tidof, Heio von Stetten	Comedy	Austrian-German co-production
Majestät brauchen Sonne	Peter Schamoni		Documentary	
Ein Mann für gewisse Sekunden	Bernhard Stephan	Katja Weitzenböck, Carin C. Tietze, Eva-Maria Hagen, Hansa Czypionka, Tom Mikulla, Matthias Reim	Comedy	
Ein Mann steht auf	Michael Lähn	Robert Atzorn, Tina Ruland, Michael Mendl, Tilo Prückner, Michael von Au, Roman Knižka	Thriller	
Mein Freund Balou	Marianne Lüdcke	Günter Lamprecht, Raphael Ghobadloo, Michael Roll, Hannelore Elsner	Road movie, Crime	a.k.a. Mein großer Freund
Men and Other Catastrophes	Ulli Baumann	Heike Makatsch, Dominic Raacke, Ulrike Folkerts, Irm Hermann, Steffen Wink, Walter Kreye	Comedy	
Men Are Like Chocolate	Uwe Wilhelm	Jennifer Nitsch, Max Tidof, Stefan Jürgens, Otto Sander	Comedy	
Menschenjagd	Markus Bräutigam	Ulrich Bähnk, Dieter Landuris	Thriller	
Michael Strogoff	Fabrizio Costa	Paolo Seganti, Léa Bosco, Hardy Krüger Jr., Esther Schweins, Giovanni Lombardo Radice, Daniel Ceccaldi, Siegfried Rauch	Adventure	Italian-German co-production
Midsommar Stories	Andi Niessner, Elena Alvarez Lutz, Michael Chauvistré, Markus Krämer, Livia Vogt, Heike Wasem	Franziska Petri, Jacques Breuer, Sandra Hüller, Jürgen Tonkel, Johannes Silberschneider	Anthology	
The Millennium Disaster: Computer Crash 2000	Anders Engström	Jürgen Prochnow, Steffen Wink, Gudrun Landgrebe, Götz Otto, Desmond Llewelyn	Disaster, Thriller	German-Australian co-production
Millennium Love	Peter Timm	Floriane Daniel, Roman Knižka	Drama	
Morgen gehört der Himmel dir	Ute Wieland	Alexandra Kamp, Anian Zollner, Siegfried Rauch, Rosel Zech, Klaus Wennemann	Drama	
Der Mörder meiner Mutter	Lars Kraume	Laura Tonke, Sebastian Koch, Leonard Lansink, Susanne Lothar	Thriller	
Die Mörderin	Christian von Castelberg	Suzanne von Borsody, Ann-Kathrin Kramer, Jürgen Hentsch, Jan Josef Liefers	Crime	
Move On Up	Alex Ross	Neil Edmond, Regine Zimmermann	Comedy	
My Best Fiend	Werner Herzog		Documentary	a.k.a. Mein liebster Feind. Documentary film about Klaus Kinski
My Wife Loves Two	Michael Keusch	Christoph M. Ohrt, Tina Ruland, Ingolf Lück, Gesche Tebbenhoff	Comedy	a.k.a. Zärtliche Begierde
Nancherrow	Simon Langton	Joanna Lumley, Patrick Macnee, Senta Berger	Drama	British-German co-production
Nicht ohne meine Eltern	Christian von Castelberg	Claudia Michelsen, Jophi Ries, Jürgen Hentsch, André Kaminski	Drama	a.k.a. Not Without My Parents
Nightfall	Fred Kelemen	Verena Jasch, Wolfgang Michael	Drama	a.k.a. Abendland. German-Portuguese co-production
Nightshapes	Andreas Dresen	Michael Gwisdek, Dominique Horwitz, Adé Sapara, Meriam Abbas, Susanne Bormann	Drama	a.k.a. Nachtgestalten. Entered into the 49th Berlin International Film Festival
No Sex	Josh Broecker	Kai Scheve, Nadja Uhl, Hanns Zischler, Christiane Krüger	Comedy	
OA jagt Oberärztin	Joachim Roering	Axel Milberg, Wolke Hegenbarth, Daniela Ziegler	Comedy	
On the Wings of Love	Gabriel Barylli	Lisa Martinek, Heio von Stetten, Maximilian Schell, Gudrun Landgrebe, Ralf Bauer, Verona Feldbusch	Comedy	a.k.a. Wer liebt, dem wachsen Flügel. German-Austrian co-production
Only a Dead Man Is a Good Man	Wolf Gremm	Thekla Carola Wied, Rolf Becker, Lambert Hamel, Dieter Mann, Juraj Kukura, Tina Ruland	Black comedy	
Operation Pandora	Diethard Küster	Mark Keller, Isabella Parkinson, Marie-Lou Sellem	Thriller	a.k.a. Ein Vater im Alleingang
Oskar and Leni	Petra Katharina Wagner	Christian Redl, Anna Thalbach	Drama	
Otomo	Frieder Schlaich	Isaach de Bankolé, Eva Mattes	Drama	
Our Island in the South Pacific	Thomas Bahmann	Herbert Knaup, Andrea Sawatzki, Alexandra Maria Lara, Ben Becker	Comedy	a.k.a. Südsee, eigene Insel
Paradise Mall	Friedemann Fromm	Franka Potente, Heiner Lauterbach, Daniel Brühl, Ken Duken, Tom Schilling, Susanne Bormann, Jürgen Tarrach, Roman Knižka, Tobias Schenke	Thriller	a.k.a. Schlaraffenland
Paths in the Night	Andreas Kleinert	Hilmar Thate	Drama	a.k.a. Wege in die Nacht
Paul und Clara – Liebe vergeht nie	Nikolai Müllerschön	Uwe Bohm, Katharina Böhm, Susanna Simon	Drama	a.k.a. Paul & Clara
Picknick im Schnee	Tomy Wigand	Matthias Habich, Chiara Schoras, Barbara Auer	Comedy	
Der Preis der Sehnsucht	Christian Görlitz	Christiane Hörbiger, Sylvester Groth, Karoline Eichhorn	Drama	
Prototype	Nikolai Müllerschön	Tim Bergmann, Edgar Selge	Thriller	a.k.a. Der Erlkönig
Racheengel – Stimme aus dem Dunkeln	Thorsten Näter	Götz George, Carin C. Tietze, Tim Bergmann, Chiara Schoras, Dieter Pfaff	Thriller	
Requiem for a Romantic Woman	Dagmar Knöpfel	Janina Sachau, Sylvester Groth, Jeanette Hain	Biography	
Rivalinnen der Liebe	Karola Meeder	Katja Woywood, Walter Sittler, Tina Ruland, Rolf Becker, Gila von Weitershausen	Drama	a.k.a. To Hear a Nightingale
Sara Amerika	Roland Suso Richter	Dennenesch Zoudé, Thomas Heinze, Oliver Korittke, Gregor Törzs	Drama	
Schande	Claudia Prietzel, Peter Henning	Stephanie Charlotta Koetz, Hansa Czypionka, Imogen Kogge, Oliver Stritzel, Nina Franoszek, Katharina Schüttler, Maren Kroymann	Drama	
Der Schandfleck	Julian Pölsler	Bernadette Heerwagen, Francis Fulton-Smith, Hans-Michael Rehberg, Manfred Zapatka, Lisa Kreuzer, Simon Schwarz, Christine Buchegger	Drama	a.k.a. The Stain of Shame. Austrian-German co-production
School's Out	Robert Sigl	Katharina Wackernagel	Horror	a.k.a. Schrei – denn ich werde dich töten!
Schwarzes Blut	Diethard Klante	Sebastian Koch, Jennifer Nitsch, Jürgen Hentsch	Thriller	
Second Hand Men	Christoph Eichhorn	Simone Thomalla, Mathieu Carrière, Ralf Richter, Simon Licht	Comedy	a.k.a. Männer aus zweiter Hand
Seven Days Left to Chance	Peter Ily Huemer	Sophie Schütt, Gregor Törzs, Anna Loos, Mirco Nontschew, Anja Kruse	Comedy	a.k.a. Sieben Tage bis zum Glück a.k.a. 7 Tage bis zum Glück
Silberdisteln	Udo Wachtveitl	Harald Juhnke, Rosemarie Fendel, Heinz Schubert, Dieter Hildebrandt	Black comedy	
Die Singlefalle – Liebesspiele bis zum Tod	Michael Keusch	Sandra Speichert, Doreen Jacobi, Giulia Siegel	Thriller	a.k.a. Die Singlefalle – Liebesspiele bis in den Tod
Sleepy Hollow	Tim Burton	Johnny Depp, Christina Ricci, Miranda Richardson, Michael Gambon, Casper Van Dien, Jeffrey Jones	Gothic supernatural horror	American-German-British co-production
Snow on New Year's Eve	Thorsten Schmidt	Tamara Simunovic, Jürgen Tarrach, Eric Burdon, Hannes Jaenicke, Barbara Rudnik, Nadja Uhl, Dieter Landuris, Oliver Petszokat, Christoph M. Ohrt, André Hennicke	Comedy	
Sonnenallee	Leander Haußmann	Alexander Scheer, Teresa Weißbach, Alexander Beyer, Robert Stadlober, Detlev Buck	Comedy	a.k.a. Sun Alley
The Speech Writer	Julia Albrecht, Busso von Müller	Robert Hunger-Bühler	Drama	a.k.a. Der Redenschreiber
Die Spesenritter	Jörg Grünler	Harald Juhnke, Jürgen Schmidt, Horst Krause	Crime comedy	
Split Second	Thomas Berger	Jasmin Tabatabai, Heinz Hoenig, Felix Eitner, Rüdiger Vogler	Thriller	a.k.a. Rendezvous mit dem Teufel
St. Pauli Night	Sönke Wortmann	Benno Fürmann, Armin Rohde, Maruschka Detmers, Florian Lukas, Valerie Niehaus, Ill-Young Kim, Christian Redl, Axel Milberg, Laura Tonke	Drama	
Stille Nacht – Heilige Nacht	Thomas Stiller	Barbara Auer, Christian Berkel, Dominique Horwitz, Marek Harloff, Birol Ünel	Thriller	
Straight Shooter	Thomas Bohn	Dennis Hopper, Heino Ferch, Katja Flint	Action thriller	
Die Stunde des Löwen	Niki Stein	Stefan Kurt, Doreen Jacobi, Helmut Griem, Ralph Herforth, Peter Lohmeyer	Thriller	
Sweet Little Sixteen	Peter Patzak	Cosma Shiva Hagen, Heikko Deutschmann, Christian Berkel	Thriller	
Tails You Win, Heads You Lose	Hans-Günther Bücking	Heike Makatsch, Christiane Paul, Andrea Eckert, Helmut Berger, Marquard Bohm, Lisa Kreuzer, Stephan Luca	Drama	a.k.a. The Heads of My Loved Ones
The Thirteenth Floor	Josef Rusnak	Craig Bierko, Armin Mueller-Stahl, Vincent D'Onofrio	Science Fiction	a.k.a. The 13th Floor. German-American co-production
Tobias Totz and his Lion	Piet De Rycker, Thilo Rothkirch	—N/a	Animated	
Der Tod in deinen Augen	Michael Rowitz	Aglaia Szyszkowitz, Thomas Kretschmann, Dominique Horwitz, Walter Kreye	Thriller	
Die Todesgrippe von Köln	Christiane Balthasar	Ann-Kathrin Kramer, Robert Stadlober, Reiner Schöne	Disaster	
Tödliche Schatten	Diethard Klante	Heinz Hoenig, Stefan Kurt, Hans-Michael Rehberg, Monica Bleibtreu, Imogen Kogge, Ernst Jacobi	Thriller	
Ein tödliches Wochenende	Torsten C. Fischer	Thomas Kretschmann, Dominique Horwitz, Helmut Berger, Andrea Sawatzki, Jochen Nickel, Jürgen Hentsch	Drama	
Todsünden – Die zwei Gesichter einer Frau	Carlo Rola	Iris Berben, Vadim Glowna, Anian Zollner	Thriller	
Traumfrau mit Nebenwirkungen	Thomas Freundner	Chrissy Schulz, Anna Loos, Thomas Heinze, Gila von Weitershausen	Comedy	
The Trucker and the Thief	Raoul Heimrich	Sven Martinek, Yvonne de Bark	Action	a.k.a. Der Träumer und das wilde Mädchen
Tuvalu	Veit Helmer	Denis Lavant, Chulpan Khamatova	Drama	
The Ultimate Fight	Rainer Matsutani	Christian Oliver, Thure Riefenstein, Chiara Schoras	Action	a.k.a. Romantic Fighter
Under the Palms	Miriam Kruishoop	Helmut Berger, Udo Kier, Sheri Hagen, Thom Hoffman	Drama	Dutch-German co-production
Unschuldige Biester	Stefan Schneider	Mina Tander, Janina Flieger, Diana Amft, Tobias Schenke, Marie-Lou Sellem, Walter Sittler	Thriller	
Urlaub auf Leben und Tod	Manuel Siebenmann	Christian Redl, Burghart Klaußner	Thriller	
Valley of the Shadows	Nathaniel Gutman	Carin C. Tietze, Natalia Wörner, Sebastian Koch, Hansa Czypionka, Loni von Friedl	Horror	
Verratene Freundschaft – Ein Mann wird zur Gefahr	Kaspar Heidelbach	Tim Bergmann, Klaus J. Behrendt, Isabella Parkinson, Regula Grauwiller	Thriller	
Verschwinde von hier	Franziska Buch	Simon Glöcklhofer, Gruschenka Stevens, Martin Feifel, Michael Brandner	Drama	
Versprich mir, dass es den Himmel gibt	Martin Enlen	Sandra Speichert, Mehmet Kurtuluş, Sonsee Neu	Drama	
The Volcano	Ottokar Runze	Nina Hoss, Meret Becker, Katharina Thalbach	Drama	
Voll auf der Kippe	Wolfgang Büld	Mike Krüger, Rolf Zacher	Comedy	
Der Voyeur	Roman Kuhn	Götz Otto, Claudia Mehnert, Axel Milberg, Miriam von Versen, Franziska Schlattner	Thriller	
Waiting Means Death	Hartmut Schoen	Ulrich Tukur, Barbara Auer, Jörg Schüttauf, Henry Hübchen, Anja Kling	Crime	a.k.a. Warten ist der Tod
Ein Weihnachtsmärchen – Wenn alle Herzen schmelzen	Johannes Fabrick	Götz Otto, Max Riemelt, Susanne Schäfer, Clelia Sarto, Lisa Maria Potthoff	Drama	
Wut im Bauch	Claus-Michael Rohne	Evelyn Hamann	Comedy	
You're Dead	Andy Hurst	John Hurt, Rhys Ifans, Claire Skinner	Crime comedy	British-German co-production
Your Best Years	Dominik Graf	Martina Gedeck, Tobias Moretti, Tim Bergmann	Drama	
Die Zauberfrau	Ilse Hofmann	Iris Berben, Martin Benrath, Rüdiger Vogler, Rosemarie Fendel	Comedy	
Zoe	Maren-Kea Freese	Kirsten Hartung, Wotan Wilke Möhring	Drama	
Zombie Doom	Andreas Schnaas	Andreas Schnaas	Horror	
