= Patrick Mölleken =

German actor (born 1993)

- Patrick Mölleken at the 76th Berlin International Film Festival
- Born: 27 September 1993 (age 33); Haan, North Rhine-Westphalia, Germany
- Occupation: Actor
- Years active: 2004–present
- Website: www.patrickmoelleken.com

Patrick Mölleken (born 27 September 1993) is a German actor.

== Biography ==
Patrick Mölleken made first experiences on stage already at the age of five at piano concerts and gala events. At the age of ten he got his first roles in TV-movies such as Alarm für Cobra 11 and Carwash. Almost simultaneously, he began his work as a voice-over artist on a radio commercial for Legoland Deutschland.

Following from this, he appeared in several further television productions accompanied by works at the recording studio. From 2006 to 2010 Mölleken attended the acting school Juniorhouse in Cologne. 2007 producer Wolfgang Rademann took Patrick Mölleken to the German Das Traumschiff and talk-host Harald Schmidt invited him as guest to his Die Harald Schmidt Show. As a dubber he participated together with Mario Adorf in the very same year in the 26-episode animated series Kleiner Dodo by lending his voice to the ape Pong.

His biggest TV-part up to that point was his role in the 2008 crime movie Pfarrer Braun – Heiliger Birnbaum, aside to Ottfried Fischer. After that Mölleken played opposite Ludwig Trepte in the TV-drama Ihr könnt euch niemals sicher sein, which was awarded among others with the Austrian television award Romy and the Grimme-Preis in 2009.

In 2010 Patrick Mölleken received the Deutschen Hörbuchpreis for Wie man unsterblich wird – Jede Minute zählt (Ways to Live Forever). His work for audio books and radio dramas has since been rewarded frequently with various nominations. They follow numerous film and television casts in a variety of formats, including Extinction – The G.M.O. Chronicles, the winter-special Der Bergdoktor – Durch eisige Höhen, Quirk of Fate, Murder in the Best Family and Isenhart: The Hunt Is on for Your Soul. In 2010 he played the leading role of Tom in the mystery and first 3D-series Grimmsberg.

Under the direction of Walter Adler he was part of the cast of the SWR2 audio book of Isabel Allende's famous Das Geisterhaus in 2010, which was honored with the Deutschen Hörbuchpreis 2011 in the category "Best Fiction".

2010 he was elected by the German youth magazine Bravo in their campaign Mission Famous as "Sinalco-Boy" and became part of the jury.

Since 2011 Mölleken has been more often seen in war productions, like in Jewish Alley, which was reviewed by Steven Spielberg, in Rommel as the Desert Fox (Ulrich Tukur)’s son, in Zersplitterte Nacht, as well as in A Good Story under the guidance of cinematographer Christopher Doyle.

Subsequent to his graduation from high school by doing his Abitur (Higher School Certificate) Patrick Mölleken embodied the role of the deathly cold spree killer KILIAN. in the 2012 same-titled movie.

In the second season of the RTL series Der Lehrer Mölleken can be seen in the role of student Moritz Schenker. In 2014 sitcom Die Kuhflüsterin Patrick Mölleken played the role of Thommy, the rebellious son of veterinary practitioner Belinda Mommsen. In 2016 he embodied the antagonist Wittich in the period film King Laurin. In Tatort: Hundstage by Stephan Wagner Patrick Mölleken played the role of Jonas Stiehler. In 2016, Wolfgang Rademann cast Mölleken in his last production Das Traumschiff: Cuba.

Since 2017 Mölleken can be seen in the ZDF series Frühling in the role of Peet Hagen, who suffers from paraplegia due a swimming accident in Frühling – Schritt ins Licht.

By publishing the music video Aber in summer of 2018, Patrick Mölleken took a stand against racism alongside Eko Fresh and Yunus Cumartpay.

On January 30, 2019, the anniversary of Adolf Hitler's seizure of power, the period movie The Last Supper was launched, in which Patrick Mölleken plays the role of Jewish National Socialist Michael Glickstein.

== Filmography ==
- 2004: Alarm für Cobra 11 – Die Autobahnpolizei (TV Series)
- 2005: Fragile
- 2005: Carwash
- 2006: Dragon Tiger Gate - Child (voice, uncredited)
- 2006: Robin Pilcher – Jenseits des Ozeans (TV Movie) - Charles Inchelvie
- 2007: Evelyn (Short)
- 2007-2017: Das Traumschiff (TV Series) - Maik Jahnke / Daniel Busch
- 2008: Maddin in Love (TV Series) - Pascal
- 2008: Familie Sonnenfeld (TV Series) - Bastian
- 2008: Pfarrer Braun (TV Series) - Lukas Lehmkuhl
- 2008: Ihr könnt euch niemals sicher sein (TV Movie) - Sven
- 2008: Alles was zählt (TV Series) - Tommy
- 2008: Die stählerne Zeit (TV Series documentary) - Hermann Enters
- 2008: Marie und die tödliche Gier (TV Movie) - Heiner (uncredited)
- 2009: Die Alpenklinik – Riskante Entscheidung (TV Movie) - Noah Baumgarten
- 2009: Kambakkht Ishq - Gangster 5 (voice)
- 2010: Der Bergdoktor (TV Series) - Lars Wiesdorf
- 2010: Rennschwein Rudi Rüssel (TV Series) - Dominik
- 2010-2013: Alle Jahre wieder (TV Series) - Stefan Sommer
- 2010-2018: In aller Freundschaft (TV Series) - Lennart Schönlein / Jan Matthies
- 2011: Quirk of Fate– Eine Laune des Schicksals - Toby
- 2011: Murder in the Best Family (TV Movie) - Daniel Lorenz
- 2011: Aktenzeichen XY... ungelöst (TV Series) - Sven
- 2011: Grimmsberg (Short) - Tom
- 2011: Isenhart: The Hunt Is on for Your Soul (TV Movie) - Isenhart - young
- 2011: Extinction – The G.M.O. Chronicles - Tom - Age 17
- 2011: Zivilcourage (Short) - Justin
- 2011: Schmidt & Schmitt – Wir ermitteln in jedem Fall – Crash ins Koma
- 2012: Achtste Groepers Huilen Niet - Joep (voice)
- 2012: Die Rosenheim-Cops (TV Series) - Severin Gschwendtner
- 2012: I Declare War - Skinner (German version, voice)
- 2012: Jewish Alley (Short) - Orthodoxer Jude
- 2012: Rommel (TV Movie) - Manfred Rommel
- 2012: Heiter bis tödlich: Fuchs und Gans (TV Series) - Max
- 2012: Knallerfrauen (TV Series) - Fahrer
- 2012: Tom's Video - Tom Litznik
- 2012-2015: Stuttgart Homicide (TV Series) - Kevin Scheuerle / Manuel Hüller
- 2013: A Good Story (Short) - Soldier Adam
- 2013: Wir - Kilian
- 2013: Sturm der Liebe (TV Series) - Hansi Dietl
- 2013-2014: Der Lehrer (TV Series) - Moritz Schenker
- 2014: The Homecoming (TV Movie) - Florian
- 2014: 16 über Nacht! (TV Movie) - Simon
- 2014: El 5 de talleres - Polaco (voice)
- 2014: Danni Lowinski (TV Series) - Pfleger
- 2014: Der Koch - Ulagu (voice)
- 2014: Weihnachten für Einsteiger (TV Movie) - Kalle
- 2014: Heiter bis tödlich: Morden im Norden (TV Series) - Robert Björnsen
- 2014: Totes Land (Short) - Jan
- 2014: Keep Your Head Up (music video)
- 2014-2019: Rosamunde Pilcher (TV Series) - Robin Dawson / Rod Marshland
- 2015: Allein unter Irren (Short) - Konsti
- 2015: Heldt (TV Series) - Timo Gerlach
- 2015: Cologne P.D. (TV Series) - Pascal Burkhard
- 2015: In aller Freundschaft – Die jungen Ärzte (TV Series) - Daniel Ruland
- 2015: Gespensterjäger – Auf eisiger Spur - Harry
- 2015: Die Kuhflüsterin (TV Series) - Thommy Mommsen
- 2016: Tatort (Episode: "Hundstage") - Jonas Stiehler
- 2016: König Laurin - Wittich
- 2016-2017: Eltern allein zu Haus (TV Mini-Series) - Jan Schröder
- 2017: Der Staatsanwalt (TV Series) - Max Töpfer
- 2017: WaPo Bodensee (TV Series) - Lukas Kerner
- 2017: The Old Fox (TV Series) - Max Lehmann
- 2017: Ein Kind wird gesucht (TV Movie) - Dani
- 2017-2018: Frühling (TV Series) - Peet Hagen
- 2018: Dahoam is Dahoam (TV Series) - Lukas Kneidinger
- 2018: Notruf Hafenkante (TV Series) - Victor Bossmann
- 2018: Mein rechter, rechter Platz ist frei ... - Tim
- 2018: Einstein (TV Series) - Eric
- 2018: Das letzte Mahl - Michael Glickstein
- 2018: Lifelines (TV Series) - Fabian Weiler
- 2018: Rentnercops (TV Series) - Ben Schmidt
- 2018: SOKO München (TV Series) - Flori
- 2018: Die Bergretter (TV Series) - Roman Stadlhuber
- 2019: Nord bei Nordwest – Gold! (TV Series) - Christoph Müller
- 2019: Hubert ohne Staller (TV Series) - Leon Schwarz
- 2019: Und tot bist Du! – Ein Schwarzwaldkrimi (two-parter) (TV Movie) - Josef Natterer (1945)
- 2020: Kranke Geschäfte (TV Movie) - Depeche Mode Kid
- 2020: Matze, Kebab und Sauerkraut (TV Movie) - Hans Lehmann
- 2020: Falk (TV Series) - Maik Beisenheim
- 2021: Der Lehrer (TV Series) - Moritz Schenker
- 2021: Jeder Vierte – War doch nur Spaß - Benny
- 2021: Väter allein zu Haus (TV Movie) - Max
- 2021: Der Staatsanwalt (TV Series) - Tom Derichs
- 2021: Sex Zimmer Küche Bad (SZKB) (Amazon Prime Video Original Series) - David
- 2023: Bettys Diagnose (TV Series) - Mark Hanke
- 2023: Endlich frei! – Tobi

== Audiography ==
=== Film ===
- 2006: Fragile
- 2007: Kleiner Dodo
- 2007: Dragon Tiger Gate
- 2007: Rubljowka – Straße zur Glückseligkeit
- 2007: Spurlos
- 2009: Bleach
- 2010: Time to Kill (Nicolas Cage)
- 2010: Summer Wars
- 2010: Themba
- 2010: Die Rückkehr der Wollmäuse
- 2010: Bleach: Memories of Nobody
- 2010: Home for Christmas
- 2012: Beneath the Darkness
- 2012: Blue Exorcist
- 2013: Pororo - The Racing Adventure
- 2014: I Declare War
- 2014: Starke Mädchen weinen nicht
- 2012: Blue Exorcist - The Movie
- 2014: Samurai Flamenco
- 2014: Der Koch
- 2015: Emma, einfach magisch! (season 2)
- 2015: Aku no Hana – Die Blumen des Bösen
- 2015: Der Spieler mit der Nummer 5
- 2015: Photo Kano
- 2016: Food Wars! Shokugeki no Soma

=== Audio books and radio dramas ===
- 2007: Angelika Bartram: Die Abenteuermaschine. (WDR).
- 2008: Silke Lambeck: Herr Röslein. Der Audio Verlag, Berlin 2008, ISBN 978-3-89813-715-7.
- 2008: Brudermord (WDR).
- 2008: Ulli Potofski and others: Locke greift an. Random House Audio, Köln 2008, ISBN 978-3-86604-813-3.
- 2008: Das Fazzoletti-Chaos. (WDR).
- 2008: Auf der Jagd nach dem Schwarzen Gold. (WDR).
- 2008: Joachim Hecker: Das Haus der kleinen Forscher. Der Audio Verlag, Berlin 2008, ISBN 978-3-89813-721-8.
- 2008: FC Schalke 04: Knappenkids 2 – Mannschaft in Gefahr.
- 2009: Silke Lambeck: Herr Röslein kommt zurück. Der Audio Verlag, Berlin 2009, ISBN 978-3-89813-862-8.
- 2009: Sally Nicholls: Wie man unsterblich wird – Jede Minute zählt. Igel Records, 2009, ISBN 978-3-89353-260-5.
- 2009: Ken Follett: Die Tore der Welt. Lübbe, Bergisch Gladbach 2009, ISBN 978-3-7857-3785-9.
- 2009: Georg Wieghaus: Die Nacht von San Juan. (WDR).
- 2009: Rudolf Herfurtner: Verschwunden im Werwolfwald. (WDR).
- 2009: Alemannia Aachen: Die Aleminis und die verschwundene Stadionuhr.
- 2010: Die große Fußball-Box: 8-9-10 – Der Fußballgeheimbund rettet die Nationalelf. Random House Audio, Köln 2010, ISBN 978-3-8371-0347-2.
- 2010: Team Undercover. Folge 5: Der geraubte Stern. Contendo Media, Krefeld 2010.
- 2010: Isabel Allende: Das Geisterhaus. Der Hörverlag, München 2010, ISBN 978-3-86717-563-0.
- 2010: Nelson und Mandela – Das Länderspiel. (WDR).
- 2011: Karl Olsberg: Rafael 2.0. Lübbe Audio, Köln 2011, ISBN 978-3-7857-4482-6.
- 2011: Tom Angleberger: Yoda ich bin! Alles ich weiß! Lübbe Audio, Köln 2011, ISBN 978-3-8339-5232-6
- 2011: Tessa Gratton: Blood Magic – Weiß wie Mondlicht, rot wie Blut. Random House Audio, Köln 2011, ISBN 978-3-8371-0930-6.
- 2011: Tessa Gratton: Blood Magic – Weiß wie Mondlicht, rot wie Blut. Random House Audio, Köln 2011, ISBN 978-3-8371-0930-6.
- 2011: Sabine Zett: Hugos geniale Welt. Jumbo, Hamburg 2011, ISBN 978-3-8337-2847-1.
- 2011: Tom Angleberger: Darth Paper schlägt zurück. Lübbe Audio, Köln 2011, ISBN 978-3-7857-4553-3.
- 2012: Sabine Zett: Hugos Masterplan. Jumbo, Hamburg 2012, ISBN 978-3-8337-2867-9.
- 2012: Sabine Zett: Hugo hebt ab! Jumbo, Hamburg 2012, ISBN 978-3-8337-2866-2.
- 2012: Anne Lepper: Hund wohin gehen wir. (WDR)
- 2012: Julianna Baggott: Memento – Die Überlebenden. Lübbe Audio, Köln, 2012, ISBN 978-3-7857-4628-8.
- 2012: Bram Stoker: Dracula. Jumbo, Hamburg 2012, ISBN 978-3-8337-2899-0.
- 2012: Sabine Zett: Very important Hugo. Jumbo, Hamburg 2012, ISBN 978-3-8337-2969-0.
- 2012: Thorsten Nesch: School Shooter. (WDR).
- 2012: Rommel. Universum Film, München 2012.
- 2012: Sigurd, der ritterliche Held. Folge 2: Im Tal der Nebel. Romantruhe, 2012.
- 2012: Tom Angleberger: Star Wars Wookiee – Zwischen Himmel und Hölle: Chewbacca. Lübbe Audio, Köln 2012, ISBN 978-3-7857-4694-3.
- 2012: Dark Mysteries. Folge 5: Narbenherz. WinterZeit, Remscheid 2012, ISBN 978-3-9437-3209-2.
- 2013: The Return of Captain Future. Folge 5: Mond der Unvergessenen. Highscore Music, München 2013, ISBN 978-3-9431-6618-7.
- 2013: Mord in Serie. Folge 7: Das Netzwerk. Contendo Media, Krefeld 2013.
- 2013: Heiko Wolz: Allein unter Superhelden. Der Audio Verlag, Berlin 2013, ISBN 978-3-8623-1243-6.
- 2013: Team Undercover. Folge 6: Der unheimliche Clown. Contendo Media, Krefeld 2013.
- 2013: Team Undercover. Folge 7: Doppeltes Spiel. Contendo Media, Krefeld 2013.
- 2013: Ulli Potofski: Lockes Matchplan – Fußballprofi. BVK, Kempen 2013.
- 2013: Sabine Zett: Hugo chillt. Jumbo, Hamburg 2013, ISBN 978-3-8337-3080-1.
- 2013: Team Undercover. Folge 8: Jagd in die Vergangenheit. Contendo Media, Krefeld 2013.
- 2013: Die schöne Magelone. Romanzen op. 33. Kohfeldt, Edewecht 2013, ISBN 978-3-8635-2031-1.
- 2013: Heroin. (WDR).
- 2013: Heiko Wolz: Die Rache der Superhelden. Der Audio Verlag, Berlin 2013, ISBN 978-3-8623-1291-7.
- 2013: Team Undercover. Folge 9: Tödliche Bedrohung. Contendo Media, Krefeld 2013.
- 2013: Mord in Serie. Folge 10: Atemlos. Contendo Media, Krefeld 2013.
- 2013: Sabine Zett: Cool bleiben, Hugo!. Jumbo, Hamburg 2013, ISBN 978-3-8337-3157-0.
- 2013: Team Undercover. Folge 10: Angst um Odysseus. Contendo Media, Krefeld 2013.
- 2014: Team Undercover. Folge 11: Gefahr aus dem Weltall. Contendo Media, Krefeld 2014.
- 2014: Robert Muchamore: Top Secret – Die Rivalen: Die neue Generation 3. Der Hörverlag, München 2014, ISBN 978-3-8445-1441-4.
- 2014: Dagmar H. Mueller: Die Chaosschwestern voll im Einsatz! Band 4. Der Hörverlag, München 2014, ISBN 978-3-8445-1365-3.
- 2014: Klaus Barbie – Begegnung mit dem Bösen. (WDR).
- 2014: Team Undercover. Folge 12: Geisterspuk im Landschulheim. Contendo Media, Krefeld 2014.
- 2014: Pierdomenico Baccalario: Der Zauberladen von Applecross: Das geheime Erbe. Band 1. Random House Audio, München 2014, ISBN 978-3-8371-2843-7.
- 2014: Michela Murgia: Accabadora. (WDR).
- 2014: Robert Muchamore: Rock War – Unter Strom. Band 1. Der Hörverlag, München 2014, ISBN 978-3-8445-1582-4.
- 2014: Team Undercover. Folge 13: Im flammenden Inferno. Contendo Media, Krefeld 2014.
- 2015: Joseph Delaney: Seventh Son – Der Schüler des Geisterjägers. cbj audio, München 2015, 978-3-8371-3055-3.
- 2015: Team Undercover. Folge 14: Unter Haien. Contendo Media, Krefeld 2015.
- 2015: Potz Blitz – Die Zauberakademie. Folge 1: Ein zauberhafter Anfang. Contendo Media, Krefeld 2015.
- 2015: Hans Pleschinski: Königsallee. Der Audio Verlag, Berlin 2015, ISBN 978-3-8623-1527-7.
- 2015: Cornelia Funke: Tintentod. Oetinger Media, Hamburg 2015, ISBN 978-3-8373-0867-9.
- 2015: Team Undercover. Folge 15: Im Fadenkreuz. Contendo Media, Krefeld 2015.
- 2015: Jennifer Niven: All die verdammt perfekten Tage. Random House Audio, München 2015, ISBN 978-3-8371-3144-4.
- 2016: Die Sneakers und das Torgeheimnis. Band 1. Random House Audio, München 2016, ISBN 978-3-8371-3505-3.
- 2016: Die Sneakers und der Supersprinter. Band 2. Random House Audio, München 2016, ISBN 978-3-8371-3507-7.
- 2016: Joe Hill, Gabriel Rodriguez: Locke & Key. Die komplette Serie. Audible Studios, Berlin 2016.
- 2016: John Boyne: Die unglaublichen Abenteuer des Barnaby Brocket. (WDR).
- 2016: Pollution Police. Folge 14: Die Zirkus-Falle. Pollution Police Media, Goch 2016.
- 2016: Joseph Conrad: Der Geheimagent. (WDR).
- 2016: Mord in Serie. Folge 24: Labyrinth. Contendo Media, Krefeld 2016.
- 2016: Lars Niedereichholz: Mofaheld. Audible Studios, Berlin 2016.
- 2016: Bochum-Detektive: Fall 1 – Schwarzes Gold. Pit & Land, Lüdinghausen 2016.
- 2016: Veit König: Surehand. Nach Motiven von Karl May. (WDR).
- 2017: Miss Melody – Verrückt vor Glück. Spotting Image, Köln 2016.
- 2017: Davide Morosinotto: Die Mississippi-Bande. Wie wir mit drei Dollar reich wurden. Random House Audio, München 2017, ISBN 978-3-8371-3824-5.
- 2017: Eugen Egner: Aldartenrahl. (WDR).
- 2017: Stuart Kummer: Pornflakes. (WDR).
- 2017: Hannah Siebern: Barfuß auf Wolken. Audible Studios, Berlin 2017.
- 2017: Barfuß am Klavier – Die Story von AnnenMayKantereit. (WDR).
- 2017: Dorian Hunter: Folge 35.2 Niemandsland – Ausgeliefert. Zaubermond-Audio, Hamburg 2017.
- 2017: John Sinclair: Sonderedition 07 Brandmal. Lübbe Audio, Köln 2017, ISBN 978-3-7857-5500-6.
- 2017: John Sinclair: Sonderedition 10 Das andere Ufer der Nacht. Lübbe Audio, Köln 2017, ISBN 978-3-7857-4877-0.
- 2017: 45 Umdrehungen. (WDR).
- 2017: John Sinclair Classics: Folge 32: Das Todeskabinett. Lübbe Audio, Köln 2017, ISBN 978-3-7857-5424-5.
- 2017: William Faulkner: Licht im August. (SWR).
- 2018: Die drei ???: Folge 191: Verbrechen im Nichts. Europa (Sony Music), München 2018.
- 2018: John Sinclair Classics: Folge 33: Irrfahrt ins Jenseits. Lübbe Audio, Köln 2018, ISBN 978-3-7857-5608-9.
- 2018: Luther Blissett: Q. (WDR).
- 2018: Caiman Club. Folge 1: Vel predator. Vel praedam. (WDR).
- 2018: David Zane Mairowitz: Marlov und der Moskauer Bombenzirkus. (WDR).
- 2019: Robert Woelfl: Überfluss Wüste. (WDR).
- 2019: Sebastian Fitzek und Vincent Kliesch: Auris. Audible Studios, Berlin 2019.
- 2019: Friedrich Schiller: Maria Stuart. Sony Music, München 2019.
- 2019: William Shakespeare: Hamlet. Sony Music, München 2019.
- 2019: William Shakespeare: Romeo und Julia. Sony Music, München 2019.
- 2019: Emily R. King: Das Feuer erwacht – Die letzte Königin. Teil 2. LYX Audio, Köln 2019, ISBN 978-3-96635-039-6.
- 2019: Kim Nina Ocker: Everything I didn't say. LYX Audio, Köln 2019, ISBN 978-3-96635-015-0.
- 2019: Carola M. Lowitz, Susanna Mewe: Jordsand. Audible Studios, Berlin 2019.
- 2020: Miss Melody. Folge 2: Summerset in Gefahr. Spotting Image, Köln 2020.
- 2020: Miss Melody. Folge 3: Das Glück ist zurück. Spotting Image, Köln 2020.
- 2020: Arthur Machen: Gruselkabinett: Folge 158: Das innerste Licht. Lübbe Audio, Köln 2020, ISBN 978-3-7857-8158-6.
- 2020: Midnight Tales – Angst um Mitternacht. Folge 08: Mehr Sein als Schein. Contendo Media, Krefeld 2020, ISBN 978-3-96762-100-6.
- 2020: Midnight Tales – Angst um Mitternacht. Folge 14: Poe-Ethische Gerechtigkeit. Contendo Media, Krefeld 2020, ISBN 978-3-96762-107-5.
- 2020: Holy Klassiker: Folge 47: Aladin und die Wunderlampe. Holysoft GmbH, Aschaffenburg 2020, ISBN 978-3-93917-458-5.
- 2021: Sophie Scholl: Der Widerstand der weißen Rose. Headroom Sound Production, Köln 2021, ISBN 978-3-96346-041-8.
- 2021: Margaret Mitchell und Amina Eisner: Vom Winde verweht - Die Prissy Edition. (WDR).
- 2021: Insel-Krimi. Folge 16: Todesstunt auf Usedom. Contendo Media, Krefeld 2021, ISBN 978-3-96762-014-6.
- 2021: Olga Grjasnowa: Gott ist nicht schüchtern. (WDR).
- 2021: Hannah Siebern: Tausend Farben der Liebe. Audible Studios, Berlin 2021.
- 2021: Küsten-Krimi. Folge 07: Mühlenmord Teil 2. Contendo Media, Krefeld 2021, ISBN 978-3-96762-060-3.
- 2021: Christoph Kolumbus: Ein Seefahrer rettet die Welt. Headroom Sound Production, Köln 2021, ISBN 978-3-96346-018-0.
- 2021: Midnight Tales – Angst um Mitternacht. Folge 47: Killer Book. Contendo Media, Krefeld 2021, ISBN 978-3-96762-165-5.
- 2021: Die drei Senioren. Folge 07: Der feuerspeiende Drache. Contendo Media, Krefeld 2021, ISBN 978-3-96762-141-9.
- 2021: Midnight Tales – Angst um Mitternacht. Folge 49: Der Fluch der Apokryphen. Contendo Media, Krefeld 2021, ISBN 978-3-96762-169-3.
- 2021: Midnight Tales – Angst um Mitternacht. Folge 50: Das Grauen von Dunwich 1. Contendo Media, Krefeld 2021, ISBN 978-3-96762-171-6.
- 2021: Midnight Tales – Angst um Mitternacht. Folge 51: Das Grauen von Dunwich 2. Contendo Media, Krefeld 2021, ISBN 978-3-96762-173-0.
- 2021: Midnight Tales – Angst um Mitternacht. Folge 52: Das Grauen von Dunwich 3. Contendo Media, Krefeld 2021, ISBN 978-3-96762-175-4.
- 2021: Midnight Tales – Angst um Mitternacht. Folge 53: Das Grauen von Dunwich 4. Contendo Media, Krefeld 2021, ISBN 978-3-96762-177-8.
- 2021: Cliffhanger Tales – Your Day. Folge 1.3: Contendo Media, Krefeld 2021.
- 2021: Cliffhanger Tales – Your Day. Folge 1.7: Contendo Media, Krefeld 2021.
- 2022: Cliffhanger Tales – Your Day. Folge 1.8: Contendo Media, Krefeld 2022.
- 2022: Cliffhanger Tales – Your Day. Folge 1.10: Contendo Media, Krefeld 2022.
- 2022: Kim Nina Ocker Die Hüter der fünf Jahreszeiten. Folge 02: The Truth in Your Touch. Lübbe Audio, Köln 2022, ISBN 978-3-47358-608-0.
- 2022: Holy Klassiker: Folge 62: Pinocchio. Holysoft GmbH, Aschaffenburg 2022, ISBN 978-3-93917-459-2.
- 2022: Sherlock Holmes Legends: Folge 06: Nora Craina. Holysoft GmbH, Aschaffenburg 2022, ISBN 978-3-96447-462-9.
- 2022: Laurie Jixon: Love between the Lines. Storytel Deutschland 2022, ISBN 978-9-15216-421-1.
- 2022: Holy Klassiker: Folge 64: Oliver Twist. Holysoft GmbH, Aschaffenburg 2022, ISBN 978-3-96447-201-4.
- 2022: Insel-Krimi. Folge 23: Das Dünengrab von Amrum. Contendo Media, Krefeld 2022, ISBN 978-3-96762-311-6.
- 2023: Laurie Jixon: Love in Every Word. Storytel Deutschland 2023, ISBN 978-9-18036-773-8.

=== Video games ===
- 2011: Harry Potter and the Deathly Hallows - Part 2 as Seamus Finnigan
- 2012: Dark Parables 3: Der Schmerz der Schneekönigin.
- 2013: Fabled Legends: Die Rückkehr des Rattenfängers.
- 2013: The Keepers: Das Geheimnis des Wächterordens.
- 2013: Edgar Allan Poe: Dark Tales: Der Goldene Käfer.
- 2014: Aion 4.5 - Steel Cavalry
- 2014: Invizimals: Der Widerstand
- 2014: Call of Duty: Advanced Warfare
- 2015: Call of Duty: Advanced Warfare – Havoc DLC
- 2015: Battlefield Hardline
- 2015: Call of Duty: Advanced Warfare – Ascendance DLC
- 2015: Call of Duty: Advanced Warfare – Supremacy DLC
- 2015: Call of Duty: Advanced Warfare – Reckoning DLC
- 2015: Until Dawn as Mike
- 2015: Star Wars Battlefront
- 2015: Tom Clancy’s Rainbow Six Siege
- 2016: ReCore
- 2016: Aion 5.1 – Der Weise des Turms
- 2016: Battlefield 1
- 2016: Titanfall 2
- 2016: Call of Duty: Infinite Warfare
- 2016: Watch Dogs 2
- 2017: Horizon Zero Dawn
- 2017: Tom Clancy’s Ghost Recon Wildlands
- 2017: Aion 5.3 – Dragon Lord's Resurrection
- 2017: Battlefield 1 – They Shall Not Pass DLC
- 2017: Aion 5.4
- 2017: Master X Master
- 2017: Battlefield 1 – In The Name Of The Tsar DLC
- 2017: Star Wars: Battlefront II
- 2017: Ostwind – Das Spiel
- 2017: SpellForce 3
- 2018: Detroit: Become Human
- 2018: Marvel's Spider-Man
- 2018: Starlink: Battle for Atlas
- 2018: Gwent: The Witcher Card Game
- 2018: Déraciné
- 2018: Battlefield V
- 2019: Metro Exodus
- 2019: Days Gone
- 2020: The Last of Us Part II

== Awards ==
- 2010: Deutscher Hörbuchpreis in category "Bestes Kinderhörbuch" (best audio-book for youth) Wie man unsterblich wird for Angeli Backhausen (direction), Kai Hogenacker (voice) und Patrick Mölleken (voice)
