= Gotto =

Gotto is a surname. Notable people with the surname include:

- Ainsley Gotto (1946–2018), Australian public servant and entrepreneur
- Antonio Gotto, American cardiologist and academic administrator
- Jim Gotto (born 1949), American politician
- Lisa Gotto (born 1976), professor

== See also ==
- Votto (surname)
