= Current Atherosclerosis Reports =

- Discipline: Cardiology
- Language: English
- Edited by: Antonio Gotto

Publication details
- History: 1999-present
- Publisher: Springer Science+Business Media
- Frequency: Bimonthly
- Impact factor: 3.417 (2014)

Standard abbreviations
- ISO 4: Curr. Atheroscler. Rep.

Indexing
- ISSN: 1523-3804 (print); 1534-6242 (web)
- LCCN: 2001212005
- OCLC no.: 40649718

Links
- Journal homepage; Online archive

Current Atherosclerosis Reports is a bimonthly peer-reviewed medical journal publishing review articles pertaining to atherosclerosis. It was established in 1999 and is published by Springer Science+Business Media. The editor-in-chief is Antonio M Gotto (Weill Cornell Medical College). According to the Journal Citation Reports, the journal has a 2025 impact factor of 5.2.
