= Ways to Live Forever =

2008 children's novel by Sally Nicholls

- Author: Sally Nicholls
- Illustrator: Sarah J. Coleman
- Language: English
- Genre: Children's
- Publisher: Marion Lloyd Books
- Publication date: 7 January 2008
- Publication place: United Kingdom
- Pages: 215 pp
- ISBN: 978-1-4071-0499-7
- OCLC: 173499434

Ways to Live Forever is a 2008 children's novel by Sally Nicholls, first published in 2008. The author's debut novel, it was written when Nicholls was 23 years old.

It won the 2008 Waterstone's Children's Book Prize, 2008 Glen Dimplex (Irish) New Writers Award, 2008 German Luchs des Jahres and 2009 Bristol-based Concorde Children's Book Award. It was shortlisted for the 2009 Manchester Book Award.

== Plot summary ==
Sam Oliver McQueen is an 11-year-old boy with leukemia. Sam spends time with his private tutor Mrs. Willis and older friend Felix, whom he met from the same children's hospital, and writes about his life with cancer throughout the book. When Felix dies, he doesn't know what to do because he always looked up to him and his rebellious style. Sam is puzzled by the sadness and writes in his book that everyone should have been happy and making jokes and how Felix should have worn his favorite top. Having said, that he told in his book he wanted to make sure no one would do that at his funeral. A couple of weeks later, the doctors realize the medication isn't working as well and Sam makes the decision to stop all medication; Sam was sick and tired of taking things that never worked on him so he gave up Sam finishes his list of "Things to do" and about a month later he has a dream: all his family (his dad, his mum and his sister Ella) are all sleeping together... then he wakes up and sees his dad's face. His dad says "I love you", but Sam drifts back asleep. Sam dies in his sleep; but he has given his parents a form to fill in about his death so he could finish his book. The last comment is made by his father, who says, "Sam died quietly in his sleep. He was in no pain.

The book was made into a film during 2010.

== Translations ==
At launch, Ways to Live Forever was translated into Dutch and published using a different title. The Dutch title Als je dit leest, ben ik dood (English: When you read this, I'll be dead) is adapted from one of the book's opening lines. It is also translated to Portuguese (Brazil and Portugal) and Indonesian, with the Portuguese title being O Menino que Sonhava Chegar à Lua (English: The Boy who Dreamed of Reaching the Moon), the Brazilian title of Como Viver Eternamente (English: How to Live Forever), the Indonesian title of Setelah Aku Pergi (English: After I'm Gone), the French title of Quand vous lirez ce livre... (English: When you read this book ...), the Italian title "Volevo vivere per sempre" (English: I wanted to live forever) and the German title of Wie man unsterblich wird (English: How to become immortal).

== Adaptation ==
It was adapted into film and was directed by Gustavo Ron which released on October 23, 2012 theatrically worldwide. It stars Robbie Kay, Alex Etel, Ben Chaplin, and Emilia Fox. The film received a positive review by the critics.

The German radio drama adaption (directed by Angeli Backhausen and produced by the WDR) stars Kai Hogenacker and Patrick Mölleken. For their performance they were awarded with the Deutscher Hörbuchpreis 2010 (German Audio Book Award 2010) as its youngest recipients. The jury of the Deutscher Hörbuchpreis explains their decision as follows:

A special book was made into a wonderful radio drama: Impressive voice actors and a gentle, intelligent direction create a serious, unpathetic masterpiece, that radiates lightness and coincidentally saddens its audience while giving hope though.

— Deutscher Hörbuchpreis

Furthermore, they were honored with the 1st Place on the hr2-Hörbuchbestenliste (hr2 Radio Drama Leaderboard), the Kinder- und Jugendhörspielpreis (Children and Youth Radio Drama Award) by the MDR Radio Council, the title CD of the Month by the Institut für angewandte Kindermedienforschung/Stiftung Zuhören, the Auditorix Hörbuch-Siegel 2009 (Auditorix Radio Drama Seal 2009), as well as with a placement on the März-Bestenliste (March Leaderboard), and an awarding with the Vierteljahrespreis (Quarterly Critics' Choice) and a nomination for the Jahrespreis (Annual Award) by the Preis der deutschen Schallplattenkritik (German Record Critics' Award).
