= Der Lehrer =

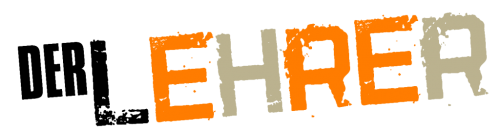
- Genre: Sitcom
- Created by: Peter Freiberg, Thomas Koch
- Directed by: Dominic Müller; Nico Zingelmann; Peter Gersina; Peter Stauch; Sebastian Sorger; Sascha Thiel; Felix Binder; Klaus Knoesel
- Starring: Hendrik Duryn; Lars Gärtner; Ulrich Gebauer; Antje Widdra; Rainer Piwek; Jessica Ginkel; Matthias Klimsa; Nadine Wrietz; Zsá Zsá Inci Brükle; Leni Säugling; Simon Böer; Claudia Hiersche; Milon Böer; Birte Hanusrichter; Tanja Schleiff
- Country of origin: Germany
- No. of seasons: 10
- No. of episodes: 104

Production
- Producers: Christiane Ruff; Astrid Quentell
- Running time: 24-46 minutes

Original release
- Network: RTL Television
- Release: August 10, 2009 – April 8, 2021
- Release: May 28, 2026

Der Lehrer (The Teacher) is a German television series. It premiered on 10 August 2009 on RTL Television. The first season consisted of 9 episodes, the second of 7. It premiered in December 2013.

On April 8, 2021, the series ended after 9 seasons and 98 episodes on RTL. RTL then announced that there would be no 10th season and canceled the series. In February 2025, RTL announced that the series would return for a 10th season. The season will consist of six episodes. In June 2026, the series was renewed for an 11th season.

== Premise ==
Der Lehrer revolves around the teacher Stefan Vollmer (Hendrik Duryn) who teaches German, Science and PE. After 10 years he comes back to be a teacher again. His new school turns out to be very problematic with students hanging around in the halls and not listening to teachers. Vollmer becomes expert for the so-called "G-Kurs" which is the most chaotic class in the school. With new and unconventional methods he finally succeeds to come through to his students and change their attitude against school.

== Cast ==
Actor	Character	Occupation	Episodes
adult actors
Hendrik Duryn	Stefan Vollmer	1.01–9.03, 10.01–	teacher
Lars Gärtner	Elmar Kreisel	1.01–1.09	teacher
Ulrich Gebauer	Günther Rose	1.01–9.13	teacher, principal (S2–S9)
Antje Widdra	Veronika Bäumler	1.01–1.09	teacher (f)
Rainer Piwek	Karl Sievers	1.01–8.10	teacher
Andrea Bürgin	Anita Herenberg	1.01–1.09	principal (f)
Frank Voß	Holger Wenker	1.01–2.01	teacher
Katja Liebing	Ute Kreisel	1.01–1.09	Elmar Kreisel's wife
Jessica Ginkel	Karin Noske	2.01–7.10, 10.04–10.05	teacher, deputy principal (f)
Matthias Klimsa	Rüdiger Matuschek	2.01–3.02	teacher
Antje Lewald	Frau Cornelius	2.02–	secretary (f)
Andrea L'Arronge	Charlotte Noske	2.05–6.05	Karin's mother
Nadine Wrietz	Barbara Knopmacher	3.01–9.13	teacher (f), Karl Siever's wife
Sebastian Baumgart	Mats Müller	3.08–3.09	student teacher
Gabriel Merz	Michael Jäger	4.06–7.10	lawyer, Stefan's best friend
Dagny Dewath	Julia Mai	5.13-7.03, 9.03	Head of Education
Leni Säugling	Frida Vollmer	7.10-9.03	Stefan's daughter
Claudia Hiersche	Melanie Flemming	9.01-9.13	principal
Simon Böer	David Ritter	9.04-9.13	teacher
Milon Böer	Julius Flemming	9.05-9.13	David Ritter's and Melanie Flemming's son.
Birte Hanusrichte	Nadia Mazur	10.01–	Stefan's neighbor and lover
Tanja Schleiff	Vanessa Bohm	10.01–	teacher, principal (S10)
student actors
Sebastian Bender	Benny Wasilewski	1.01–1.09	student
Friedrich Brockmann	Kevin	1.01–1.09	student
Farbod Borhanazad	Ahmed	1.01–1.09	student
Nadja Mühlenbach	Britta	1.01–1.09	student (f)
Susan Hoecke	Corinna Sabic	1.01–1.02, 1.07–1.08	student (f)
Max Felder	Leon Gössner	1.01–1.09, 4.02	student
Joyce Ilg	Laura	1.03, 2.08	student (f)
Fabienne Hesse	Ronja	1.01–1.09	student (f)
Jan-David Bürger	Mirko	2.02–2.08	student
Patrick Mölleken	Moritz	2.02, 2.04-2.05, 9.02	student
Sophie Steinbüchel	Lena	2.01–2.08	student (f)
Charley Ann Schmutzler	Sophie Keller	2.02	student (f)
Daniel Popat	Alfie	2.03–2.08	student
Carolin von der Groeben	Leonie	2.02–2.08	student (f)
Karolina Berthold	Jana	2.03–2.08	student (f)
Zejhun Demirov	Mehmet Yilmaz	2.01–4.06; 5.09	student
Merlin Rose	Jonas Burmeister	2.07, 3.09, 5.07, 7.03-7.04, 7.10-8.10	former student, Stefan's son
Aram Arami	Jamil Abu-Khalil	3.01–4.06	student
Mira Wegert	Kim	3.02	student (f)
Anna Florkowski	Alina	3.01–	student (f)
Pauline Angert	Natascha	3.01–4.06	student (f)
Jasper Smets	Marvin	3.01–3.02, 3.04, 3.06–3.10	student
Rouven David Israel	Ludger	3.01, 3.04–3.05, 3.07, 3.09–	student
Markus Roland	Jan Lindner	1.04, 1.05	former student, drug dealer, night club operator
Gerrit Klein	Jan Lindner	3.10, 4.12	former student, drug dealer, night club operator
Jascha Rust	Tom Harbacher	4.01–4.06	student
Christian Braun	Dennis	4.01–4.06	student
Sinje Irslinger	Nikki	4.01–	student (f)
Sven Gielnik	Bela	4.06–	student
Janosch Lencer	Jens	4.08–	student
Bela Gabor Lenz	Oleg	4.08–	student
Zsá Zsá Inci Bürkle	Emma Dehler	4.11, 5.03, 5.12-5.13, 7.08-9.13	student (f)
Julius Nitschkoff	Luis Schmitz	5.01–	student
Mascha von Kreisler	Melanie	5.01–	student (f)
Cosima Henman	Dunja Baum	5.01–	student (f)
Jeanne Goursaud	Bibi	5.01–	student (f)
Emily Lowin	Paula	5.02	student (f)
Yannic Lippe	Richard	5.03	student

guest actors

The show could already engage several known actors for guest roles. Frederick Lau as Picko in the third episode of season 1. Also Anna Stieblich, Marie Rönnebeck, Esther Esche, Yvonne de Bark, Sonja Baum, Guido Renner, Markus Hoffmann, Jannik Schümann, Sotiria Loucopoulos, Almila Bagriacik, Xenia Georgia Assenza, Nick Julius Schuk, Lion Wasczyk, Claudia Mehnert, Nick Romeo Reimann, Marvin Linke, Kathrin Ackermann and MoTrip in one or more episodes.

== Production ==
The series has already been produced in 2007 but aired two years later due to lack of interest of the audience. It aired from 10 August to 31 August 2009, Mondays 9:15pm, with two episodes back-to-back. The sixth episode aired on 25 November 2009 in the night 4:25am (graveyard slot).

2011, RTL decided to continue the show as one hour series. The new season was filmed from April to August 2012. Jessica Ginkel and Matthias Klimsa joined the cast. The second season was originally planned to air in the 2012-13 television season. However, the start date has been pulled back to 5 December 2013.

== Reception ==
Der Lehrer won a Deutscher Fernsehpreis (German Television Award) in 2009 in the category “Beste Serie” (“best TV series”).

Season	Episodes	Originally released		Viewers (millions)	Viewers rank	18–49 rating/share	18–49 rank
Season	Episodes	First released	Last released	Viewers (millions)	Viewers rank	18–49 rating/share	18–49 rank
1	9	September 24, 2007	May 19, 2008	8.31	68	3.3/8	46

== Episodes ==
=== Season 1 (2009) ===
Episode	Title	Original air date
1 (1.01)	Der Neue (The New Guy)	10 August 2009
2 (1.02)	Ahmed (Ahmed)	10 August 2009
3 (1.03)	Picko (Picko)	17 August 2009
4 (1.04)	Jan (Jan)	17 August 2009
5 (1.05)	Nicht schon wieder Jan (Not Jan again)	24 August 2009
6 (1.06)	Benny (Benny)	25 November 2009
7 (1.07)	Leon (Leon)	24 August 2009
8 (1.08)	Corinna (Corinna)	31 August 2009
9 (1.09)	Britta (Britta)	31 August 2009

=== Season 2 (2013-14) ===
Episode	Title	Original air date
10 (2.01)	Ich hab’ ja gesagt, ich bin Lehrer (I told you I'm a teacher)	5 December 2013
11 (2.02)	Wird das jetzt ein Date? (Is this going to be a date?)	12 December 2013
12 (2.03)	Elektroschocker, Pfefferspray und ein SEK vor der Tür (Taser, pepper spray and a SWAT team in front of the door)	19 December 2013
13 (2.04)	Einfach meine Freundin vögeln (Just humping my girlfriend)	2 January 2014
14 (2.05)	Wieder so ein fieser Vollmer-Trick (Again such a mean Vollmer trick)	9 January 2014
15 (2.06)	Kann ich hier mobben? (May I bully someone around here?)	16 January 2014
16 (2.07)	Sie reden auch erst und denken dann, oder? (You also speak before you think, right?)	23 January 2014
17 (2.08)	Oh Gott, es ist eine Liebesgeschichte (Oh my god, it's a love story)	30 January 2014

=== Season 3 (2015) ===
Episode	Title	Original air date
18 (3.01)	Gangsta, Gangsta! (Gangsta, Gangsta!)	8 January 2015
19 (3.02)	Und ob Sie mich wollen! (And how you want me!)	8 January 2015
20 (3.03)	Wo war nochmal der Feuerlöscher? (Where was the extinguisher again?)	15 January 2015
21 (3.04)	Jeder hat doch irgendwie 'nen Schaden (Everyone's damaged somehow)	22 January 2015
22 (3.05)	Sie haben einen Arzt geschlagen? (You hit a doctor?)	29 January 2015
23 (3.06)	Die sind verliebt, die zählen nicht! (They're in love, they don't count!)	5 February 2015
24 (3.07)	Zieh's dir rein und weine (Watch and cry)	12 February 2015
25 (3.08)	Ich glaub', du bist hier das Problemkind (I think you're the problem child in this scenario)	19 February 2015
26 (3.09)	Deine DNS, Dein Job! (Your DNA, your job!)	26 February 2015
27 (3.10)	Sex? Wir? Pff! (Sex? Us? Pff!)	5 March 2015

=== Season 4 (2016) ===
Episode	Title	Original air date
28 (4.01)	Du willst in mein Leben? Das ist mein Leben! (You wanna be a part of my life? This is my life!)	7 January 2016
29 (4.02)	Und Gehirn war nicht dabei? (And a brain wasn't part of it?)	14 January 2016
30 (4.03)	Sie sind mein L-Lieblingslehrer! (You are my f-favorite teacher!)	21 January 2016
31 (4.04)	... und dich auf deinen verdammten Knien! (... and you on your damned knees!)	28 January 2016
32 (4.05)	Die Flatter, Horror, Hose voll! (The flutter, horror, having the jitters!)	4 February 2016
33 (4.06)	Topf... Deckel... (Pot... cover...)	11 February 2016
34 (4.07)	Schwing die Hufe Blondie! (Haul your ass blondie!)	18 February 2016
35 (4.08)	Hab ich 'nen bösen Zwilling? (Do I have an evil twin?)	25 February 2016
36 (4.09)	Verknallt? So'n Quatsch! (Infatuated? Bullshit!)	3 March 2016
37 (4.10)	... nimmt der Prophet halt den Bus! (... then the prophet rides the bus!)	10 March 2016
38 (4.11)	Like in a fucking French Movie... so unverkrampft (Like in a fucking French movie... so relaxed)	17 March 2016
39 (4.12)	Sie mieser... Schuft (You lousy... wretch)	24 March 2016
40 (4.13)	Die 1-1-2 ist so viel einfacher zu merken (The 1-1-2 is so much easier to memorise)	31 March 2016

=== Season 5 (2017) ===
Episode	Title	Original air date
41 (5.01)	Am Ende kriegt der Held auch noch das Mädchen (And in the end the hero even gets the girl)	5 January 2017
42 (5.02)	Paula mehr Popo (Paula more butt)	12 January 2017
43 (5.03)	Wenn's hilft, kann ich dir gerne eine scheuern?! (If it helps I can just smack you?!)	19 January 2017
44 (5.04)	Du vermisst sie wirklich, oder? (You really miss her, don't you?)	26 January 2017
45 (5.05)	Irgendwie war's besser, als er noch nicht geredet hat (Somehow it was better before he talked)	2 February 2017
46 (5.06)	Wir woll'n euch knutschen sehen! (We wanna see you smooch!)	9 February 2017
47 (5.07)	40.000 Gründe, die Eier in die Hand zu nehmen, anstatt sie zu schaukeln! (40,000 reasons to grab your balls and do it, instead of rocking them)	16 February 2017
48 (5.08)	Ist es der Jagdtrieb, weil Säbelzahntiger ausgestorben sind? (Is it the hunting instinct, because saber-tooth cats have become extinct?)	23 February 2017
49 (5.09)	Das ist quasi 'ne Win-win-Situation... (It's kinda a win-win-situation)	2 March 2017
50 (5.10)	Ich bin vor allem besser im Gehen als im Bleiben (I'm especially better with going than staying)	9 March 2017
51 (5.11)	Wusste gar nicht, dass Sie so 'ne Dramaqueen sind (Didn't know you're such a drama queen)	16 March 2017
52 (5.12)	Is doch kein Einbruch, wenn man 'nen Schlüssel hat (It's not a burglary when you have a key)	23 March 2017
53 (5.13)	Ganz der Papa! (Exactly like daddy!)	30 March 2017

=== Season 6 (2018) ===
Episode	Title	Original air date
54 (6.01)	... und trotzdem kriegen die immer irgendwie alles hin! (... and still they somehow always manage to make it!)	4 January 2018
55 (6.02)	Ich bin 'ne wandelnde Sonnenuhr (I'm a walking sundial)	11 January 2018
56 (6.03)	Entweder völlig bekloppt, oder Stahleier (Either totally crazy, or balls made out of steel)	18 January 2018
57 (6.04)	Okay, jetzt muss er weg! (Okay, now he has to go!)	25 January 2018
58 (6.05)	Pikante Details kosten extra (Spicy details have extra costs)	1 February 2018
59 (6.06)	Irgendwelche Notrufe, Alarme, Explosionen? (Any emergency calls, alarms, explosions?)	8 February 2018
60 (6.07)	Liebe auf’n ersten Blick wird’s ja schon mal nich’! (It won't be love at first sight!)	15 February 2018
61 (6.08)	Erst Fluchtweg überlegen, dann abhauen! (First consider the escape route, then leave)	22 February 2018
62 (6.09)	Sie sind doch gar kein Veganitarier! (You're not a veganitarian at all!)	1 March 2018
63 (6.10)	Wieso strahlst du wie’n Einhorn auf Heimaturlaub? (Why do you shine like a unicorn on home vacation?)	8 March 2018
64 (6.11)	Meinste so’n Tumor fragt erstmal nach’m Perso? (My first such tumor asks for my person?)	15 March 2018
65 (6.12)	Und es war le-gen-där! (And it was le-gen-dary!)	22 March 2018

=== Season 7 (2018-2019) ===
Episode	Title	Original air date
66 (7.01)	Immer schön auf die Regeln pochen ... und sie dann brechen! (Always insist on the rules ... and then break them!)	27 December 2018
67 (7.02)	Das is’n Date und keine Prüfung (This is a date and not an exam)	3 January 2019
68 (7.03)	... weil Dummheit nicht lustig ist, sondern traurig (... because stupidity is not funny, it is sad)	10 January 2019
69 (7.04)	Einfach mal Klartext geredet... (Just put it plainly ...)	17 January 2019
70 (7.05)	Hast du Pech beim Denken, oder was?! (Are you unlucky when thinking, or what ?!)	31 January 2019
71 (7.06)	In einer Woche bettelt er um Sex! (In a week he'll be begging for sex!)	7 February 2019
72 (7.07)	Okay, ihr wollt’n Kind? Könnt ihr haben (Okay, you want a child? You can have)	14 February 2019
73 (7.08)	Ok, in der Tonlage klingt das schon irgendwie dramatisch ... (Ok, it sounds kind of dramatic in the pitch ...)	21 February 2019
74 (7.09)	Kleiner Tipp, werd’ besser ’n besserer Lügner ... ! (Little tip, get ’better’ a better liar ...!)	28 February 2019
75 (7.10)	...nimm dein Schwert mit! (... take your sword with you!)	7 March 2019

=== Season 8 (2019-2020) ===
Episode	Title	Original air date
76 (8.01)	Und ich dachte schon, ich bin der Idiot ... (And I thought I was the idiot ...)	26 December 2019
77 (8.02)	... so’ne kleine Vollmerette! (... such a little Vollmerette!)	2 January 2020
78 (8.03)	Besser’n Mädchen, als so’n Hodenkobold! (Better a girl than a testicle goblin!)	9 January 2020
79 (8.04)	... wenn du quatschen willst, hol dir ne Nutte! (... if you want to chat, get a hooker!)	16 January 2020
80 (8.05)	Influencer, nicht Influenza (Influencer, not influenza)	23 January 2020
81 (8.06)	Was hat mich verraten, der Rollstuhl? (What gave me away, the wheelchair?)	30 January 2020
82 (8.07)	Hast du mich grad’ Nazi genannt?! (Did you just call me a Nazi ?!)	6 February 2020
83 (8.08)	Magen-Darm muss man wollen! (You have to want the gastrointestinal tract)	13 February 2020
84 (8.09)	Das sollen mir die Toten mal selbst erklären (Let the dead explain that to me themselves)	20 February 2020
85 (8.10)	Asche zu Asche, Joint zu Joint (Ashes to ashes, joint to joint)	5 March 2020

=== Season 9 (2020-2021) ===
Episode	Title	Original air date
86 (9.01)	Der hat einfach zu viel Energie (He just has too much energy)	31 December 2020
87 (9.02)	Vergessen Sie Ihre Hände nicht (Don't forget your hands)	7 January 2021
88 (9.03)	Nichts ist für immer, außer die Veränderung (Nothing is forever except change)	14 January 2021
89 (9.04)	Weil ich ’ne Lücke füllen muss (Because I have to fill a gap)	21 January 2021
90 (9.05)	X=PLD*10KM²*p+40*PM (X=PLD*10KM²*p+40*PM)	28 January 2021
91 (9.06)	David Ritter von der Drogenfahndung (David Ritter from the Drugs Unit)	4 February 2021
92 (9.07)	Mit wie viel L schreibt man Bullshit? (How much L does one write bullshit with?)	11 February 2021
93 (9.08)	Was macht ein Lehrer im Gefängnis? ...Sitzenbleiben (What does a teacher do in prison? ...Remain seated)	18 February 2021
94 (9.09)	Song! Lied! Kantate! Keine Ahnung, wie man das in Ihrem Alter nennt (Song! Song! Cantata! I have no idea what that is called at your age)	25 February 2021
95 (9.10)	Ist das 'n Fetisch, oder muss ich mir Sorgen um dich machen? (Is that a fetish or do I have to worry about you?)	4 March 2021
96 (9.11)	Ey, zu viele Geldscheine geraucht oder was?! (Hey, smoked too many bills or what ?!)	11 March 2021
97 (9.12)	Geil, geil, geil (Cool, cool, cool)	25 March 2021
98 (9.13)	Zu doll am Socken gerochen? (Smelled too much on your socks?)	8 April 2021

=== Season 10 (2026) ===
Episode	Title	Original air date
99 (10.01)	Einfach nur ein Ticket ziehen und einsteigen (Simply take a ticket and board)	
100 (10.02)	Tag zwei im Job und schon den Kopf auf der Tischplatte? (Day two on the job and already your head is on the desk?)	
101 (10.03)	Nicht jedes Herzklopfen ist ’ne Panikattacke (Not every heart palpitation is a panic attack)	
102 (10.04)	Die Kröte hatte recht (The toad was right)	
103 (10.05)	So gucken Freunde Freunde nicht an (That's not how friends look at each other)	
104 (10.06)	Und da ist sie, die schlechte Nachricht (And here's the bad news)	

== See also ==
- List of German television series
