= Peter Lohmeyer =

German actor (born 1962)

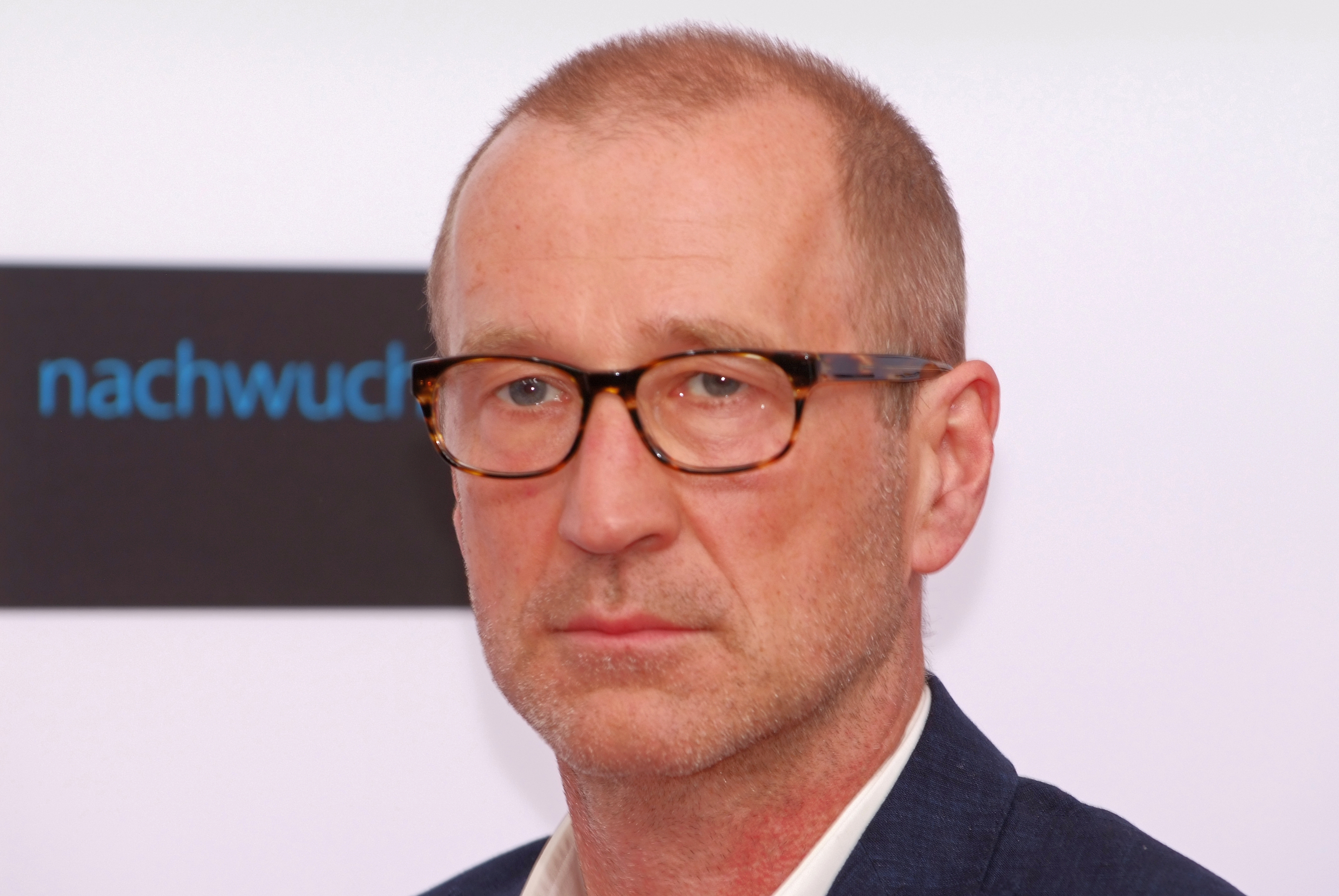
- Lohmeyer in 2012
- Born: 22 January 1962 (age 64); Niedermarsberg, West Germany
- Occupation: Actor
- Years active: 1980–present
- Spouse: Sarah Wiener (2008–2014)

Peter Lohmeyer (born 22 January 1962) is a German actor. He has appeared in more than one hundred films since 1980.

== Life and career ==
Lohmeyer is the youngest of three children of the Protestant pastor Dieter Lohmeyer and his wife. Due to his father's profession, he completed his school education at various places. From 1972–1974, he attended the Albrecht-Dürer-Gymnasium in Hagen, the Eberhard-Ludwigs-Gymnasium in Stuttgart from 1974 to 1976, and the Stadtgymnasium Dortmund from 1976 to 1981. From 1982 to 1984, he received acting lessons at the Westfälische Schauspielschule in Bochum, but left without graduating.

Lohmeyer made his stage debut in the play called Was heißt hier Liebe at the Schauspielhaus Bochum. Afterwards he performed at theatres in Düsseldorf, Stuttgart, Hamburg, and at the Schiller Theater in Berlin. In 2009, he returned to the Schauspielhaus Bochum for a new stage version of the play Menschen im Hotel. He took on his first role in a TV movie called Der Kampfschwimmer in 1983. Afterwards, he took role in the TV movie Alles Paletti. Loymeyer made his film debut in the comedy Tiger, Lion, Panther in 1988. He became famous with Die Straßen von Berlin (1995 to 1998) and The Miracle of Bern (Das Wunder von Bern, 2003, by Sönke Wortmann). Lohmeyer also played leading roles in movies by Peter Lichtefeld, a German film director, including the road movie Trains'n'Roses, which earned him a German Film Award. In 2005 he was seen in The Day Bobby Ewing Died by Lars Jessen. Lohmeyer received the German Film Award in Gold for Trains'n'Roses and in 2000, he received a Bavarian TV Award for Der Elefant in meinem Bett.

Lohmeyer has four children from two different relationships. He and his former partner, camera assistant Katrin Klamroth, have three children (Lola Klamroth, Louis Klamroth and Leila Lynn Klamroth). His fourth son, Ivo Lohmeyer, comes from another relationship. From 2008 to July 2014, he was married to Sarah Wiener.

== Selected filmography ==
Film
Year	Title	Role	Director	Notes
1989	Tiger, Lion, Panther	Florian	Dominik Graf	
1990	The Gamblers	Jojo	Dominik Graf	
1990	Neuner	Kurt	Werner Masten	
1991	Hausmänner	Mike	Peter Timm	TV film
1992	Schlafende Hunde	Thomas	Max Färberböck	TV film
1993	Kaspar Hauser	Leopold von Baden	Peter Sehr	
1994	One of My Oldest Friends	Charley	Rainer Kaufmann	TV film
1995	Die Eroberung der Mitte	Mark Stroemer	Robert Bramkamp	
1995	Zu treuen Händen	Harry Schlenz	Konrad Sabrautzky	TV film
1995	Bunte Hunde	Toni Starek	Lars Becker	
1996	The Killer's Mother	Theo Bono	Volker Einrauch	
1996	Killer Condom	Sam Hanks	Martin Walz	
1997	Refuge	Henri	Christoph Schrewe	TV film
1998	Trains'n'Roses	Kommissar Franck	Peter Lichtefeld	
1998	Mammamia	Daniel	Sandra Nettelbeck	TV film
1998	Night Time	Hauptkommissar Graf	Peter Fratzscher	
1998	Abgehauen	Manfred Krug	Frank Beyer	TV film
1999	Der Elefant in meinem Bett	Lennard	Mark Schlichter	TV film
2000	Recycled	Martin Lamm	Maria von Heland	
2001	Prüfstand VII	Wernher von Braun	Robert Bramkamp	
2002	A Map of the Heart	Robert	Dominik Graf	
2003	The Miracle of Bern	Richard	Sönke Wortmann	
2004	The Wishing Tree	Carl Senger	Dietmar Klein	TV miniseries
2005	The Day Bobby Ewing Died	Peter	Lars Jessen	
2005	Playa del Futuro	Jan	Peter Lichtefeld	
2005	Oktoberfest	Richard Krüger	Johannes Brunner	
2005	Obaba	Ingeniero Werfell	Montxo Armendáriz	
2006	Vineta	Sebastian Färber	Franziska Stünkel	
2006	Deepfrozen	Ronnie	Andy Bausch	
2007	The Other Boy	Winnie Morell	Volker Einrauch	
2007	Vorne ist verdammt weit weg	Johann Griesmaier	Thomas Heinemann	
2008	Age and Beauty	Manni	Michael Klier	
2010	Give Me Your Heart	Alexander Ludwig	Nicole Weegmann	
2011	Fortress	Robert	Kirsi Marie Liimatainen	
2012	Eine Hand wäscht die andere	Johnny Kassowitz	Hermine Huntgeburth	TV film
2013	Art Girls	Peter Maturana / Laurens Maturana	Robert Bramkamp	
2015	The Girl King	Bishop of Stockholm	Mika Kaurismäki	
2016	Young Light	Konrad Gorny	Adolf Winkelmann	

TV series
Year	Title	Role	Notes
1993	Der kleine Vampir – Neue Abenteuer	Robert Bohnsack	13 episodes
1995–1998	Die Straßen von Berlin	Alex Vitalijev	10 episodes
2010–2012	Allein gegen die Zeit	Mr. Funke	26 episodes
2010–2015	Craig Russell's Jan Fabel series	Jan Fabel	4 episodes
2026	The Trap	Lisa Konrad's father	Miniseries
