= Antje Schmidt =

German actress (born 1967)

- Born: 1967 (age 58–59); Moers, Germany
- Occupation: Actress
- Years active: 1989-present

Antje Schmidt (born 1967) is a German actress. She appeared in more than sixty films since 1989.

== Selected filmography ==
Year	Title	Role	Notes
1989	With the Next Man Everything Will Be Different		
1998	Ultimate Trespass		TV film
1998	Trains'n'Roses		
2002	Amen.		
