= Craig Russell (British author) =

Scottish novelist, short story writer and author

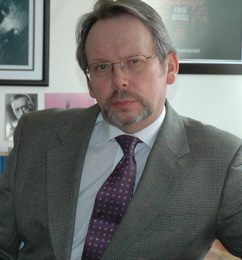
- Craig Russell in 2009
- Occupation: Novelist
- Writing career
- Genres: Fiction: thriller, Gothic horror, crime, historical, speculative and science fiction.
- Website: www.craigrussell.com

Craig Russell, also known by the pseudonym Christopher Galt, is a Scottish novelist, short story writer and author of The Devil Aspect. His Hamburg-set thriller series featuring detective Jan Fabel has been translated into 23 languages. Russell speaks fluent German and has a special interest in post-war German history. His books, particularly The Devil Aspect and the Fabel series, tend to include historical or mythological themes.

In February 2007, Russell was awarded the Polizeistern (Police Star) by the Hamburg Police, the only non-German ever to have received this accolade. In June 2007, Russell was shortlisted for the £20,000 CWA Gold Dagger, the world's largest literary prize for crime fiction. Also in 2007, Russell was shortlisted for the SNCF Prix Polar Award in France.

He was the winner of the 2008 CWA Dagger in the Library. His novel Dead Men and Broken Hearts was a finalist for both 2012 inaugural Bloody Scotland Crime Book of the Year Award and the 2013 Ellis Peters Historical Dagger. In 2015, his novel The Ghosts of Altona won the Scottish Crime Novel of the Year at the Bloody Scotland Festival. He was again shortlisted for the McIlvanney Prize in 2017 for The Quiet Death of Thomas Quaid, and The Devil Aspect was shortlisted for the 2019 Wilbur Smith Adventure Writing Award. Russell won the 2021 McIlvanney Prize for his novel Hyde, making him the first in the prize's history to win twice.

In 2014, he wrote the book Biblical under the pseudonym Christopher Galt'. In April 2015, Biblical was issued in paperback under the title The Third Testament.

Having been acquired in an auction by Jason Kaufman, Dan Brown's editor at Doubleday, Russell's Gothic thriller The Devil Aspect was published in the United States in March 2019, the film rights (under the title Where the Devil Hides) having already been acquired by Columbia Pictures/Sony. The UK edition was published by Constable/Little, Brown.

== Bibliography ==
The novels Craig Russell has written include:

=== Jan Fabel series ===
Jan Fabel is a fictional contemporary German detective. Fabel, whose rank is that of Erster Kriminalhauptkommissar (Principal Chief Commissar), is the head of the Mordkommission (Murder Squad) of the Hamburg Police. Fabel is half-Scottish, half-German and trained as a historian before becoming a policeman. The cases he investigates tend to involve a strong historical or mythological element.

- Blood Eagle (2005)
- Brother Grimm (2006)
- Eternal (2007)
- The Carnival Master (2008)
- The Valkyrie Song (2009)
- A Fear of Dark Water (2011)
- The Ghosts of Altona (2015)

=== Lennox series ===
- Lennox (2009)
- The Long Glasgow Kiss (2010)
- The Deep Dark Sleep (2011)
- Dead Men and Broken Hearts (2012)
- The Quiet Death of Thomas Quaid (2016).

=== Standalone Novels ===
- Biblical (2014) [written as Christopher Galt and released as UK paperback as The Third Testament (2015)]
- The Devil Aspect (2019)
- Hyde (2021)
- The Devil's Playground (2023)

== Filmography ==
Four of Craig Russell's novels in the Fabel series have been produced by Tivoli Film. A fifth is currently in production for German public broadcaster ARD:

- Murder Is No Fairy Tale (aka Wolfsfährte, directed by Urs Egger, premiere date 30 October 2010)
- Blood Eagle (aka Blutadler, directed by Nils Willbrandt, premiere date 3 November 2012)
- Eternal (aka Brandmal, directed by Nicolai Rohde, premiere date 19 September 2015)
- Carneval (directed by Nicolai Rohde, premiere date 15 September 2018)
- The Valkyrie Song, the fifth novel to be adapted, went into production on 9 April 2019

In all five films, the lead title of Jan Fabel has been played by Peter Lohmeyer.
