= Peter Jordan (actor) =

German actor

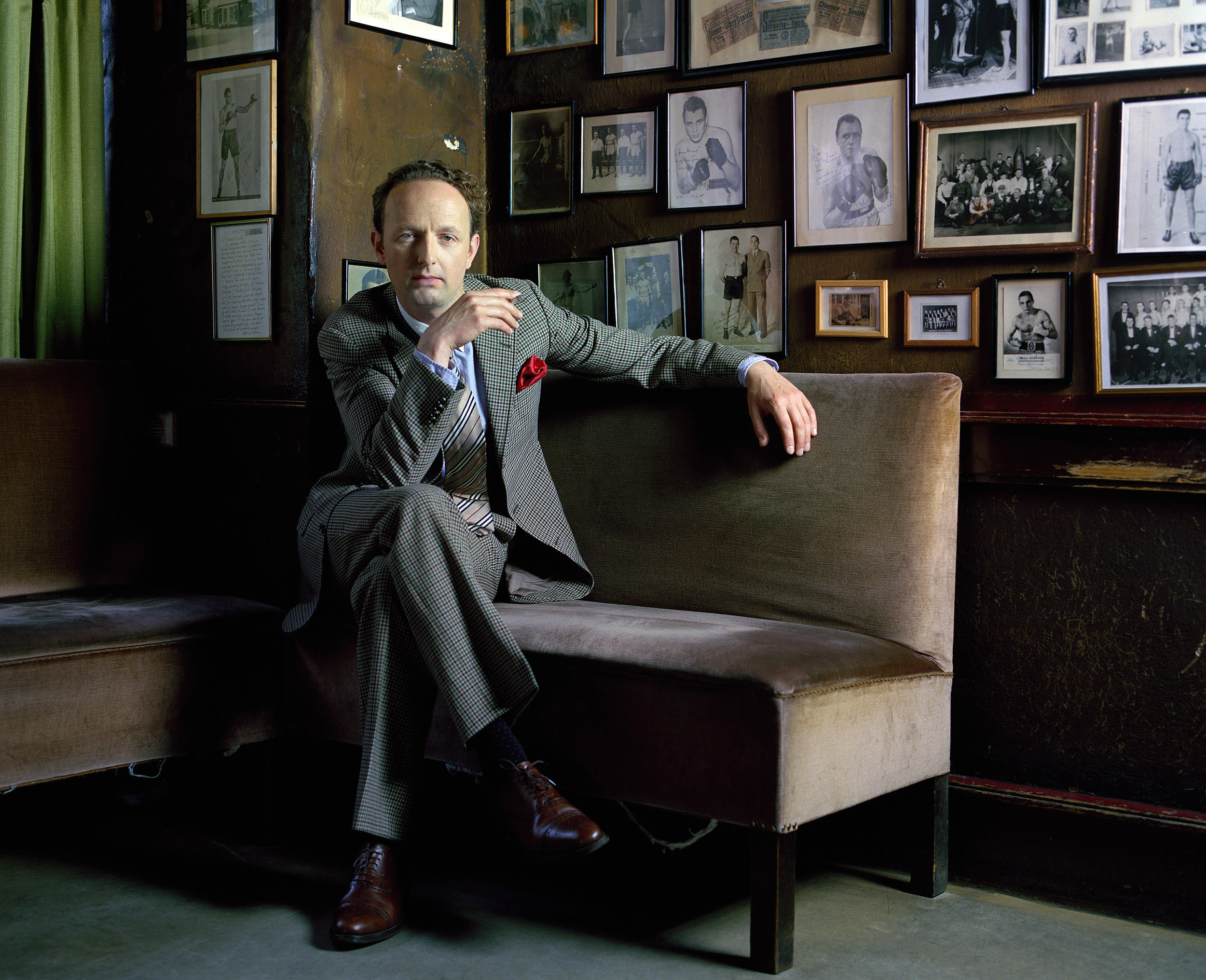
- Peter Jordan, Berlin 2009, portrait by Oliver Mark
- Born: 26 April 1967 (age 59); Dortmund, West Germany
- Occupation: Actor
- Years active: 1995–present

Peter Jordan (born 26 April 1967) is a German actor. He has appeared in more than seventy films since 1995.

== Selected filmography ==
Year	Title	Role	Notes
2004	The Runaway	Walter	Short
2008	What if Death Do Us Part?	Hanns Dunkel	
2008	Robert Zimmermann Is Tangled Up in Love	Karsten	
2008	Sheep and Chips	Fuchs	
2009	Soul Kitchen		
2012	Die Kirche bleibt im Dorf	Dieter Osterioh	
2015	Amour Fou	Adam Müller	
2018	Wackersdorf	Claus Bössenecker	
