= The Gamblers (1990 film) =

1990 film

- Directed by: Dominik Graf
- Written by: Christoph Fromm; Dominik Graf
- Produced by: Eberhard Junkersdorf
- Starring: Peter Lohmeyer; Anica Dobra
- Cinematography: Klaus Eichhammer
- Edited by: Christel Suckow
- Music by: Andreas Köbner; Dominik Graf
- Release date: 1990
- Language: German

The Gamblers (German: Spieler) is a 1990 romantic comedy film co-written and directed by Dominik Graf. It was entered into the main competition at the 47th Venice International Film Festival.

== Cast ==
- Peter Lohmeyer as Jonathan a.k.a. Jojo
- Anica Dobra as Kathrin
- Hansa Czypionka as Tom
- Joachim Kemmer as Strobeck
- Anthony Dawson as Roy
- Claus-Dieter Reents as Hugo
- Adele Neuhauser as Anette
- Volker Eckstein as Anwalt

== Release ==
The film premiered in competition at the 47th edition of the Venice Film Festival.

== Reception ==
A contemporary Variety review described the film as 'a cheerful hut overlong romantic comedy seemingly influenced by early Truffaut and German cinema of the '60s'. La Stampa's film critic Lietta Tornabuoni praised the film, referring to it as 'a disjointed and funny comedy' portraying contemporary youth with 'subtle psychological accuracy'. Filmdienst described it as 'lovingly and wittily written [...] Occasionally overwrought, but for those who recognize its references and cinematic inspirations, it is as amusing as it is stimulating'.
