= A Map of the Heart =

- Directed by: Dominik Graf
- Starring: Karoline Eichhorn; Antonio Wannek
- Release date: 10 February 2002 (BIFF)
- Running time: 2h 2min
- Country: Germany
- Language: German

A Map of the Heart (German: Der Felsen) is a 2002 German drama film directed by Dominik Graf.

== Cast ==
- Karoline Eichhorn - Katrin Engelhardt
- Antonio Wannek - Malte Gosrau
- Sebastian Urzendowsky - Kai Gosrau
- Ralph Herforth - Jürgen Benthagen
- Peter Lohmeyer - Robert
- Caroline Schreiber - Foster mother
- Ulrich Gebauer - Foster father
