= The Cat (1988 film) =

1988 German crime thriller film

- Directed by: Dominik Graf
- Written by: Uwe Erichsen (novel); Christoph Fromm
- Produced by: Georg Feil; Günter Rohrbach
- Starring: Götz George; Gudrun Landgrebe
- Cinematography: Martin Schäfer
- Edited by: Christel Suckow
- Music by: Andreas Köbner
- Production companies: Bavaria Film; ZDF
- Distributed by: Constantin Film
- Release date: 21 January 1988
- Running time: 118 minutes
- Country: West Germany
- Language: German

The Cat (German: Die Katze) is a 1988 German crime film directed by Dominik Graf.

== Plot ==
Two bank robbers hold the clerks hostage and demand 3 million German marks as ransom. What the police do not realize is that the true criminal mastermind watches them from outside the bank, anticipating their every move.

== Cast ==
- Götz George as Probek
- Gudrun Landgrebe as Jutta Ehser
- Joachim Kemmer as Voss
- Heinz Hoenig as Junghein
- Ralf Richter as Britz
- Ulrich Gebauer as Ehser
