= World Wide Motion Pictures Corporation =

Film and TV production company

World Wide Motion Pictures Corporation (WWMPC) is a film and TV production and distribution company with executive offices located in Huntington Beach, CA. The company was founded in 1977.

Its specialty is in US theatrical releasing, focusing on foreign language and independent films. Past releases include Amy, Red Roses and Petrol, Applause, Ways to Live Forever, The Nightingale, and The Road to Mother (2016).

The company also maintains a film/TV library of more than 350 titles available for distribution and broadcast.

== History ==
World Wide Motion Pictures was founded in July 1977 and became World Wide Motion Pictures Corporation (WWMPC) on December 9, 1980. From 1983 to 2006 the company was a fully reporting publicly held entity trading on the NASD Electronic Bulletin Board Exchange. In 2006, the corporation became affiliated with Energy King, Inc. through a reverse merger mechanism. In 2008, the company separated from Energy King, with WWMPC having no further association with them.

The company's executive offices are in Huntington Beach, CA. Other facilities and subsidiary locations are maintained in Sherman Oaks, CA, Detroit, MI, and New York City, NY.

WWMPC was established with the goal of funding, developing, packaging, producing, purchasing, and distributing a diverse range of filmed and videotaped entertainment. This includes feature films, short subjects, docudramas, documentaries, industrial films, and television productions.

Feature films and short subject projects completed and/or distributed by WWMPC are sold to exhibitors, television networks, television cable companies, and home entertainment outlets throughout the world. The company generates revenue from a variety of sources; the three basic media sources are: (1) theatrical exhibition (after agreements with the exhibitors have been made which provide for payment by the exhibitors of percentage of box office receipts with or without a guarantee of a fixed minimum); (2) licensing to television networks, regional broadcasters, and syndicated agreements (also after agreements which provide for a fixed license fee payable in periodic installments); and (3) wholesale of film/DVD product to various home entertainment outlets encompassing both foreign and domestic markets after an agreed upon fixed retail rental formula. Additional profits may also accumulate from ancillary exploitation of media product, including satellite broadcast, video on demand, and internet streaming/download; screenings on airlines, cruise ships, university circuits, and military bases; and literary rights, merchandising, and related paraphernalia.

WWMPC has a 16-member Board of Directors and elected officers. Board committees and staff committees include an Executive Committee and other policy and operating committees.

In addition to ongoing general submissions, WWMPC currently owns, maintains, and continually expands on a completed film and television library encompassing over 300 motion picture, documentary, docudrama, and television titles. The company also owns a screenplay and teleplay library, film production equipment, a sound effects library, a still slide library, novels, and options on other literary works.
