= Joachim Kemmer =

German actor, cabaret artist, singer and voice actor

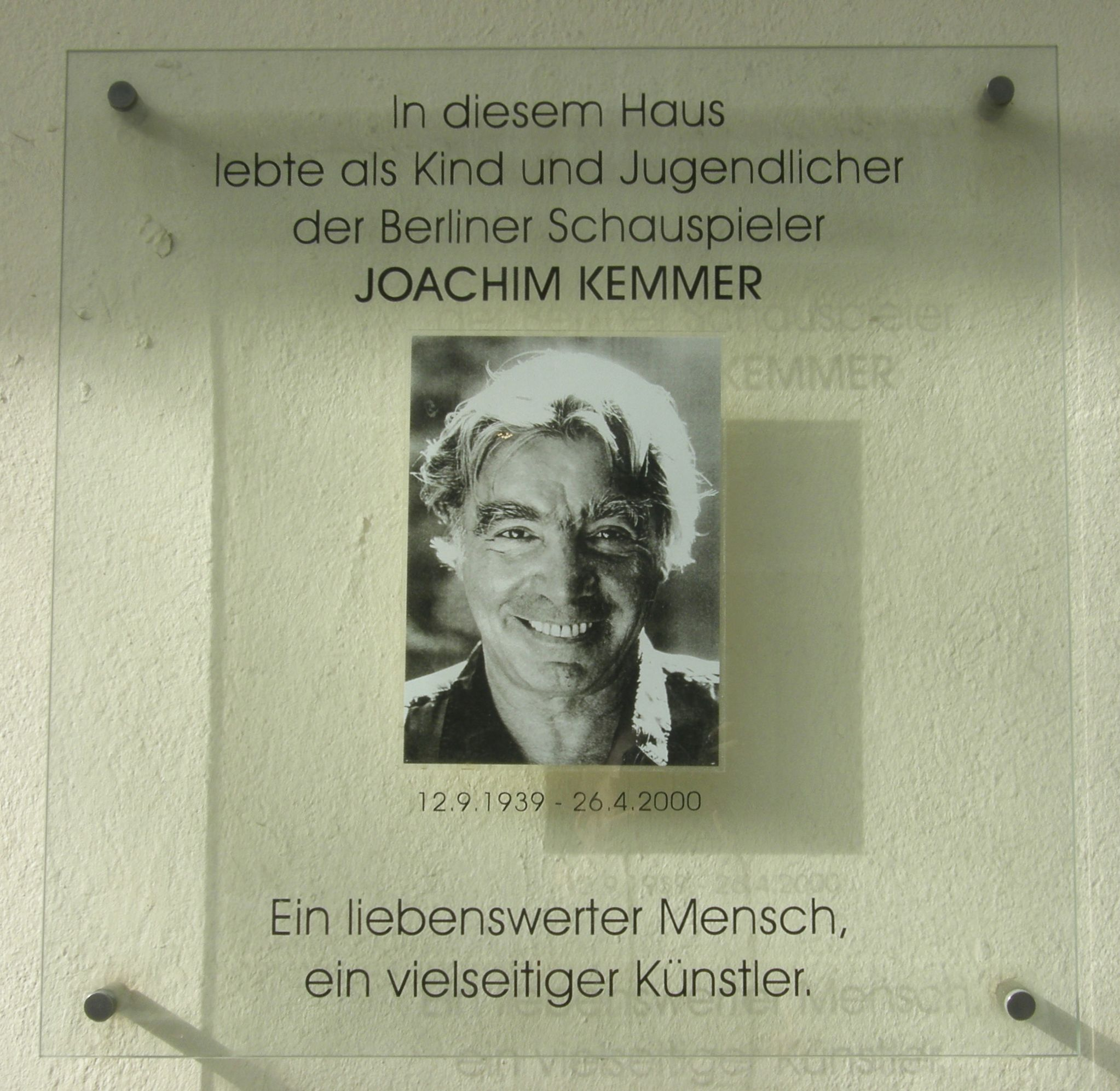
- Born: 12 September 1939; Brandenburg an der Havel, German Reich
- Died: 26 April 2000 (aged 60); Vienna, Austria
- Occupations: Actor; cabaret artist; singer; voice actor
- Years active: 1969-2000

Joachim Kemmer (12 September 1939 – 26 April 2000) was a German actor, cabaret artist, singer, and voice actor. He appeared in more than seventy films from 1969 to 2000.

He did dubbing work for many German language versions of Disney animated films, voicing Sebastian in The Little Mermaid, Wilbur in The Rescuers Down Under, Lumiere in Beauty and the Beast, Jafar in Aladdin, Rafiki in The Lion King and Ratcliffe in Pocahontas. He also voiced Rasputin in Anastasia and Zozi in Bartok the Magnificent from Fox Animation Studios outside of Disney in Phoenix, Arizona.

== Personal life and death ==
Kemmer died on April 26, 2000, at Vienna, Austria the age of 60 due to lung cancer.

== Selected filmography ==
- The Vampire Happening (1971), as Friar Martin
- Welcome in Vienna (1986), as Lt. Binder
- Meier (1986), as Kretschmar
- Otto: The New Movie (1987), as Schmieriak
- The Cat (1988), as Voss
- The Gamblers (1990), as Strobeck
- Pakten (1995), as Madina
- An Ambiguous Report About the End of the World (1997), as Johannes Christof
