= Trains'n'Roses =

1998 film

- Directed by: Peter Lichtefeld
- Written by: Peter Lichtefeld; Luisa Roger
- Starring: Joachim Król; Peter Lohmeyer; Outi Mäenpää; Jochen Nickel; Oliver Marlo; Kati Outinen; Kari Väänänen
- Cinematography: Frank Griebe
- Edited by: Bernd Euscher
- Music by: Christian Steyer
- Production companies: Bosko Biati Film; Kinoproduction; Prokino Filmproduktion; Westdeutscher Rundfunk
- Release dates: 9 July 1998 (Germany); 9 April 1999 (Finland)
- Running time: 87 minutes
- Countries: Germany; Finland
- Languages: German; Finnish

Trains'n'Roses (German: Zugvögel ... Einmal nach Inari) is a 1998 German-Finnish romantic comedy film directed by Peter Lichtefeld.

== Plot ==
Hannes, a truck driver from Germany, is a train timetable enthusiast who dreams of winning the first prize at the International Timetable Contest that is to be held in Inari, Finland. When his boss ruins his plans to travel to Inari, Hannes knocks his boss unconscious and leaves the country. While on his trip to Finland by train, his boss is found dead at his office, making Hannes the prime suspect. During his journey, unaware that he is being pursued, Hannes meets many new people, including the love of his life.

== Cast ==
- Joachim Król as Hannes Weber
- Peter Lohmeyer as Kommissar Franck
- Outi Mäenpää as Sirpa Salonen
- Jochen Nickel as Lothar
- Peter Franke as Karl-Heinz
- Nina Petri as Frau Kößner
- Hilmi Sözer as Harry
- Oliver Marlo as Lako
- Peter Franzén as Lako's lover
- Antje Schmidt as Kleine vom Supermarkt
- Kati Outinen as Inkeri
- Kari Väänänen as Asko
