= Blood Eagle (novel) =

2005 novel by Craig Russell

- First edition
- Author: Craig Russell
- Language: English
- Series: Jan Fabel
- Genre: Thriller
- Publisher: Hutchinson
- Publication date: 2005
- Publication place: UK
- Media type: Print (hardback & paperback)
- Pages: 384 pp (hardcover)
- ISBN: 0-09-180014-5
- Followed by: Brother Grimm

Blood Eagle is a novel by Craig Russell. First published in 2005, it is the first in a series of crime novels set in Hamburg, Germany, and featuring Kriminalhauptkommissar Jan Fabel. Blood Eagle, as well the follow-up novels in the series, are characterized by their use of history, mythology and legend. In Blood Eagle, Fabel hunts a serial killer who uses an ancient Viking ritual of human sacrifice, the blood eagle, to kill his victims.

== Plot ==
Two women die horrific, ritualistic deaths. The murderer writes emails to Hamburg Police's Kriminalhauptkommissar Jan Fabel. What begins as a hunt for an elusive serial killer, turns darker and more twisted as Fabel and his team uncover the Blood Eagle ritual, political intrigue, murky Nazi connections, undercover cops and a Ukrainian crime lord who is about to violently take complete control of Hamburg.

== Jan Fabel ==
The detective created by Craig Russell is half-Scottish, half-German (Frisian). Police officers often refer to him as "der englische Kommissar" (the English Detective) because part of his education took place in the UK and because he carries himself with what Germans perceive as a British elegance and restraint. He is divorced and father of one daughter. No vices, no corruption, Fabel is conceived as a good man with a strong intellect and moral fortitude. He is thoughtful, quiet and highly regarded by his team as both expert and mentor/father figure. He loves the finer things, good living, clothes, food, music and he lives alone in this novel. The beginning of the novel introduces the reader to a dark and melancholy side. Fabel dreams about the victims. They are a constant reminder for him to never give up on a case – the victims deserve justice. Another interesting facet of this cop is the fact that he studied to become a historian. When his girlfriend at the time fell prey to a murderer, young Fabel changed course and joined the police.

== Film adaptation ==
Blood Eagle (aka Blutadler) was produced for German television by Tivoli Film for public broadcaster ARD. It was directed by Nils Willbrandt, and adapted by Daniel Martin Eckhart. It premiered on 3 November 2012. The lead role was played by German actor Peter Lohmeyer. Although it is the first in the series of Jan Fabel novels, Blood Eagle was filmed after Brother Grimm.

== Awards ==
For the creation of the best-selling Jan Fabel thrillers, Russell became the only non-German to be awarded the highly prestigious Polizeistern by the Polizei Hamburg.
