= The Runaway (2004 film) =

2004 film

- Directed by: Ulrike Grote
- Starring: Peter Jordan; Maximilian Werner
- Release date: 2004
- Country: Germany

Ausreißer aka The Runaway is a 2004 German short film starring Peter Jordan and Maximilian Werner. In 2006, it was nominated for the Academy Award for Best Live Action Short Film.
