= Nick Romeo Reimann =

German actor (born 1998)

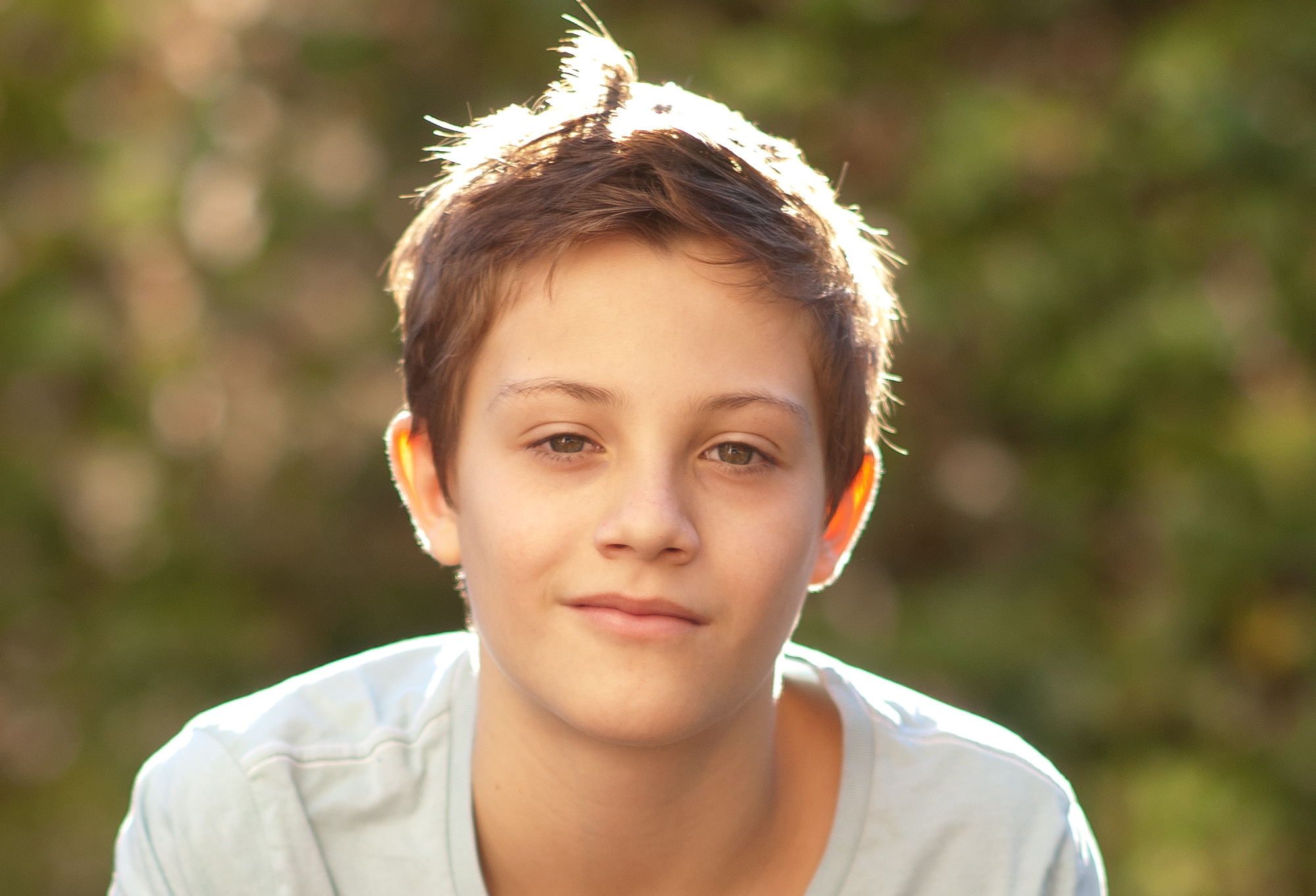
- Nick Romeo Reimann (2010)
- Born: January 14, 1998 (age 28); Munich, Germany
- Occupation: Actor
- Years active: 2006–present
- Height: 1.80 m (5 ft 11 in)

Nick Romeo Reimann (born 14 January 1998 in Munich) is a German actor.

== Filmography ==
Film
Year	Film	Role	Notes
2006	The Wild Soccer Bunch 3	Nerv	
2007	The Wild Soccer Bunch 4	Nerv	
2008	The Wild Soccer Bunch 5	Nerv	
2009	The Crocodiles	Hannes	
2010	The Crocodiles Strike Back	Hannes	
2011	The Crocodiles: All for One	Hannes	
2012	Turkish for Beginners	Nils Schneider	
2013	Young Fast & Fierce	Hell GTI	
2015	V8 - Die Rache der Nitros	Hell GTI	
2018	Unzertrennlich nach Verona	Danile	TV movie
Guest appearances
Year	Title	Role	Episodes
2006	SOKO München	Tobias Stadler	"Ein besseres Leben"
2012	Der Cop und der Snob	Tim Gneisner	"Adel vernichtet"
2015	SOKO München	Jasper Fuchs	"Auf Abwegen "
2016	Der Alte	Finn Kollarz	"Liebesrausch "
2017	Der Lehrer	Marc	"Du vermisst sie wirklich, oder? "
2019	Ein Fall für zwei	Adem Jasari	"Adem"
2021	Kommissarin Lucas	Franz Vegener	"Nürnberg"
Dubbing
Year	Film	Role	Note
2010	Ponyo	Sosuke	German Version
2010	Diary of a Wimpy Kid	Greg Heffley	German Version
2011	Diary of a Wimpy Kid: Rodrick Rules	Greg Heffley	German Version
2012	Diary of a Wimpy Kid: Dog Days	Greg Heffley	German Version
Music Videos
Year	Artist	Single	Note
2012	PRAG	"Bis einer geht"	Cameo Role

== Awards and nominations ==
Award	Year	Category	Result	Work
Young Artist Award	2010	Best Performance in an International Feature Film - Leading Young Performer	Nominated	Vorstadtkrokodile
