= Votto (surname) =

Votto is an Italian surname. Notable people with the surname include:

- Antonino Votto (1896–1985), Italian operatic conductor and vocal coach
- Joey Votto (born 1983), Canadian-American baseball player

== See also ==
- Gotto
