= Ways to Live Forever (film) =

2010 film

- Spanish film poster
- Directed by: Gustavo Ron
- Written by: Sally Nicholls; Gustavo Ron
- Produced by: Martyn Auty; Jaime Martul
- Starring: Robbie Kay; Alex Etel; Ben Chaplin; Emilia Fox; Greta Scacchi
- Cinematography: Miguel P. Gilaberte
- Music by: Cesar Benito
- Production companies: Life&Soul Productions; El Capitan Pictures; Formato Producciones
- Distributed by: InTandem (worldwide); World Wide Motion Pictures Corporation (North America)
- Release date: 29 October 2010 (Spain)
- Countries: United Kingdom; Spain
- Language: English

Ways to Live Forever is a 2010 drama film by director Gustavo Ron based on the award-winning 2008 novel of the same name written by Sally Nicholls. The film stars Robbie Kay, Alex Etel, Ben Chaplin, Emilia Fox, and Greta Scacchi. Life&Soul Productions, El Capitan Pictures, and Formato Producciones produced the film. It was distributed via Karma in Spain, World Wide Motion Pictures Corporation for North America, and InTandem for the rest of the world.

== Cast ==
- Robbie Kay as Sam, A 12-year-old boy who likes to know facts. He is dying of leukemia. He has a list of things he wants to do before he dies. The book Ways to Live Forever is presented as his writing book.
- Alex Etel as Felix, Sam's friend who has cancer. He has a wheelchair and is straightforward.
- Ben Chaplin as Daniel, Sam's father, a quiet man.
- Emilia Fox as Amanda, Sam's mother.
- Eloise Barnes as Ella, Sam's younger sister.
- Phyllida Law as Gran, Sam's grandmother.
- Greta Scacchi as Mrs. Willis, Both Sam and Felix's tutor, who likes to teach "fun stuff".
- Natalia Tena as Annie, A nurse who rides around on a pink scooter and calls herself "Dracula", on account that she often takes kids' blood samples.
- Ella Purnell as Kaleigh, Felix's cousin, who helps Sam and Felix into her uncle's pub for a drink and a kiss.

== Production ==
Ways to Live Forever was filmed in studio and on location in and around Newcastle upon Tyne: Eldon Square, Tynemouth, North Shields, Cullercoats, and Whitley Bay.
