= Karoline Eichhorn =

German actress (born 1965)

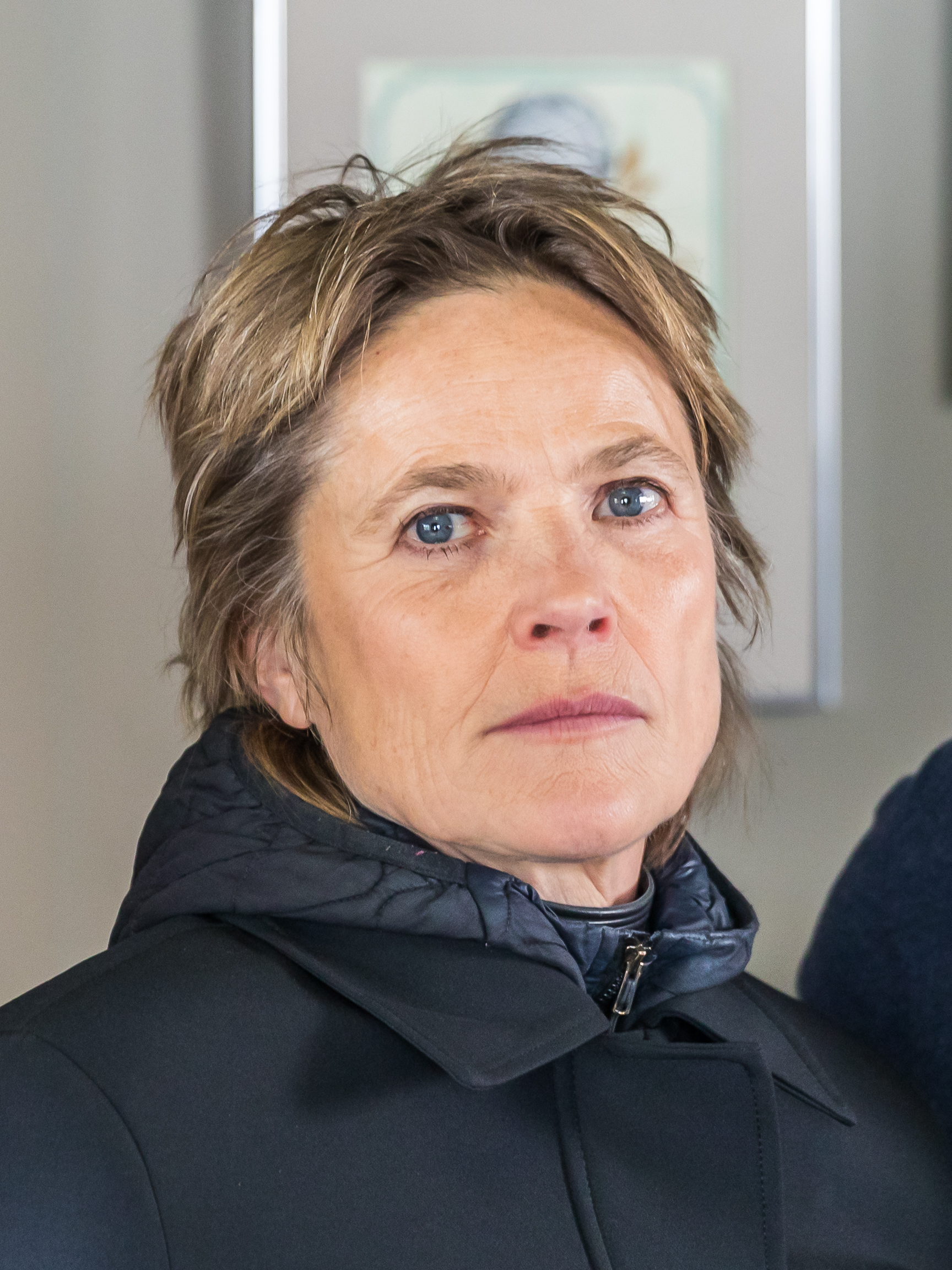
- Eichhorn in 2024
- Born: 9 November 1965 (age 60); Stuttgart, West Germany
- Occupation: Actress
- Years active: 1988–present
- Known for: Dark

Karoline Eichhorn (born 9 November 1965) is a German stage, film, television, and voice actress.

== Life and career ==
Eichhorn went to a Waldorf school in Stuttgart, graduated in 1986, and then attended the Folkwang University of the Arts in Essen until 1989. From 1989 until 1995, she held engagements at Schaubühne and Schauspielhaus Bochum theaters. Starting in 2017, Eichhorn starred as Charlotte Doppler in the ensemble cast of the acclaimed Netflix production Dark.

She became known to movie audiences in 1995 in the films Three Days in April and Der Sandmann. In the latter, she plays a journalist who as part of her research, spies on a shady crime writer played by Götz George. Eichhorn mainly works in theater, such as the Thalia Theater in Hamburg and the Burgtheater in Vienna, but she consistently appears in television and film productions. In 2012, she was a member of the international jury of the 61st International Filmfestival Mannheim-Heidelberg. From 2017 to 2020, Eichhorn starred in the Netflix series Dark.

== Selected filmography ==
=== Film ===
List of film appearances, with year, title, and role shown
Year	Title	Role	Notes
1995	Three Days in April	Anna Baisch	
1995	Der Sandmann	Ina Littmann	
1998	Abgehauen	Ottilie Krug	Documentary
1999	After the Truth	Rebekka Rohm	
2002	A Map of the Heart	Katrin Engelhardt	
2007	Du bist nicht allein	Silvia Wellinek	
2010	In the Shadows	Dora Hillmann	
2010	The Silence	Ruth Weghamm	
2012	Die Kirche bleibt im Dorf	Christine Häberle	
2012	Tod einer Brieftaube	Christiane Garde	

=== Television ===
List of television appearances, with year, title, and role shown
Year	Title	Role	Notes
1988	Oh Gott, Herr Pfarrer		1 episode
1997	Balko		1 episode
1998	Anwalt Abel - "Todesurteil für eine Dirne"		1 episode
1998	Die Neue – Eine Frau mit Kaliber		1 episode
2000	Rosa Roth - "Tod eines Bullen"	Jenny Palenta	1 episode
2004	Der letzte Zeuge		1 episode
2004	Bella Block - "Die Freiheit der Wölfe"	Anette Hansen	1 episode
2005–2006	Vier gegen Z	Julia Lehnhoff	27 episodes
2007	Doppelter Einsatz		1 episode
2008	Der Kriminalist		1 episode
2009	Stolberg		1 episode
2009	Der kleine Mann	Lydia	8 episodes
2009	Der Dicke		1 episode
2011	Stubbe – Von Fall zu Fall		1 episode
2011	Stuttgart Homicide		1 episode
2011	Ein Fall für zwei		1 episode
2012	Flemming		1 episode
2012	SOKO München		1 episode
2013	Bella Block - "Angeklagt"	Jana Larson	1 episode
2013–2017	Die Kirche bleibt im Dorf	Christine Häberle	
2017–2020	Dark	Charlotte Doppler	

== Awards ==
- Silberner Löwe – best new actress for Der Sandmann (1996)
- Bavarian TV Awards for Gegen Ende der Nacht (1998)
- Adolf-Grimme-Preis for Gegen Ende der Nacht (together with Oliver Storz, Stefan Kurt, and Bruno Ganz – 1999)
- Bavarian Film Awards – best actress for A Map of the Heart (2001)
