= Die Kirche bleibt im Dorf =

- Film poster
- Directed by: Ulrike Grote
- Starring: Natalia Wörner; Karoline Eichhorn; Julia Nachtmann
- Release date: 23 August 2012
- Running time: 97 minutes
- Country: Germany
- Language: German

== Die Kirche bleibt im Dorf ==
(translated: The church remains in the village) is a 2012 German comedy film directed by Ulrike Grote.

=== Cast ===
- Natalia Wörner as Maria Häberle
- Karoline Eichhorn as Christine Häberle
- Julia Nachtmann as Klara Häberle
- Christian Pätzold as Gottfried Häberle
- Elisabeth Schwarz as Elisabeth Rossbauer
- Stephan Schad as Karl Rossbauer
- Hans Löw as Peter Rossbauer
- Gary Francis Smith as Howard Jones
- Peter Jordan as Dieter Osterloh
- Dietz Werner Steck as Harald Löffler
- Rolf Schübel as Rolf Merz
- Ulrich Gebauer as Schäuble
- Dominik Kuhn as Jürgen Bauer

== Täterätää! – Die Kirche bleibt im Dorf 2 ==
The sequel to the first film was released in 2015 in cinemas and was first broadcast on ARD on 7 September 2019.

=== Cast ===
- Natalia Wörner: Maria Häberle
- Stephan Schad: Karl Rossbauer
- Karoline Eichhorn: Christine Häberle
- Gary Francis Smith: Howard Jones
- Julia Nachtmann: Klara Häberle
- Hans Löw: Peter Rossbauer
- Franziska Küpferle: Elisabeth Rossbauer
- Christian Pätzold: Gottfried Häberle
- Ulrich Gebauer: Pfarrer Schäuble
- Sabine Hahn: Tante Ruth
- Rainer Piwek: Hinnark Krüger
- Meike Kircher: Sabine Windelband
- Joachim Raaf: Georg Brüderle
- Frank Stöckle: Walter Dengler
- Rolf Schübel: Rolf Merz
- Jasper Diedrichsen: Rezeptionist Detlef

== Series ==
There is also a series from 2013 with the same name.

It tells the prequel to the first film. It is directed by Ulrike Grote, who is also responsible for the script of the Swabian dialect comedy, and Rolf Schübel. The first broadcast of the television series began on 15 April 2013 on SWR television.

The second season started on 8 December 2014, the third season on 19 October 2015. The first season consists of 12 episodes, the following three seasons six each.

== Episodelist ==
=== Season 1 ===
No. (Sum)	Nr.	Title	Airing Date
1	1	Ludwig	2013-04-15
2	2	Maria	2013-04-15
3	3	Karl	2013-04-22
4	4	Klara	2013-04-22
5	5	Elisabeth	2013-04-29
6	6	Anni	2013-04-29
7	7	Erwin	2013-05-06
8	8	Gottfried	2013-05-06
9	9	Christine	2013-05-13
10	10	Kai-Uwe	2013-05-13
11	11	Sola	2013-05-20
12	12	Des Läba isch koin Schlotzer (Life is not a lollipop)	2013-05-20

=== Season 2 ===
No. (Sum)	Nr.	Title	Airing Date
13	1	Ihr Kinderlein kommet	2014-12-08
14	2	O du Fröhliche	2014-12-08
15	3	Lasst uns froh und munter sein	2014-12-15
16	4	O Tannenbaum	2014-12-15
17	5	Stille Nacht	2014-12-22
18	6	Kling, Glöckchen, Klingelingeling	2014-12-22

=== Season 3 ===
No. (Sum)	Nr.	Title	Airing Date
19	1	Freiheit (Freedom)	2015-10-19
20	2	Geschäfte (Businesses)	2015-10-19
21	3	Rausch (Frenzy)	2015-10-19
22	4	Erpressung (Blackmail)	2015-10-26
23	5	Polterabend	2015-10-26
24	6	Hochzeit (Wedding)	2015-10-26

=== Season 4 ===
No. (Sum)	Nr.	Title	Airing Date
25	1	Heimathafen (Home Port)	2017-12-25
26	2	Hinterhalt (Ambush)	2017-12-25
27	3	Hiebe (Blow)	2017-12-26
28	4	Hosianna (Hosanna)	2017-12-26
29	5	Halali (Death Halloo)	2018-01-01
30	6	Himmelfahrt (Feast of the Ascension)	2018-01-01
