= Sally Nicholls =

British children's book author

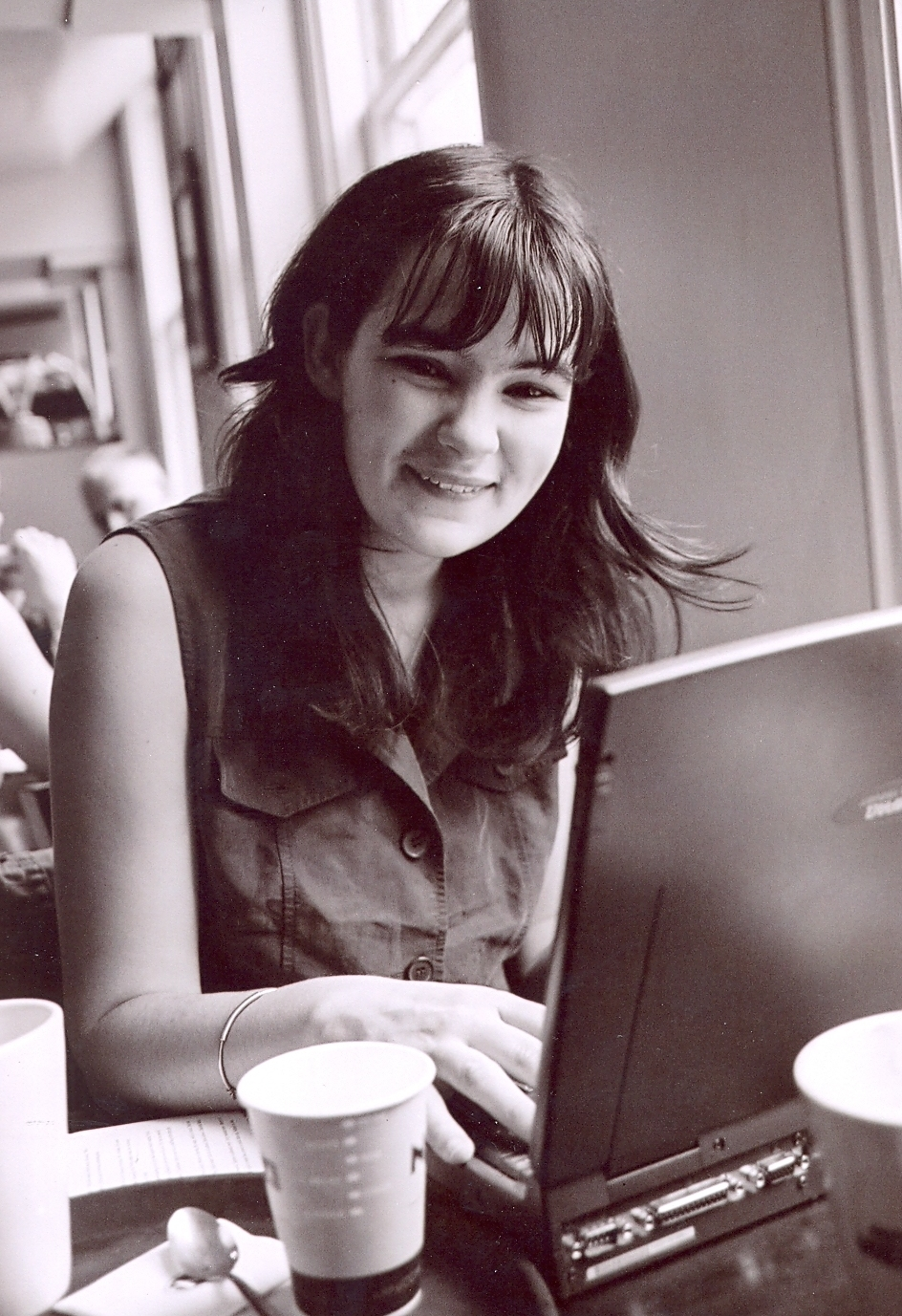
- Sally Nicholls in 2006
- Born: 22 June 1983 (age 43); Stockton-on-Tees, England, United Kingdom
- Occupation: Novelist
- Writing career
- Notable works: Ways to Live Forever (2008); Season of Secrets (2009)
- Website: www.sallynicholls.com

Sally Nicholls (born 22 June 1983) is a prize-winning British children's book author.

== Life ==
Nicholls was born and grew up in Stockton-on-Tees, England. She attended Great Ayton Friends' School until its closure and subsequently Egglescliffe School until 2001.

On finishing school, Nicholls chose to travel around the world. She reached Australia and New Zealand, following a period of working in Japan at a Red Cross hospital.

She returned to the United Kingdom to begin a bachelor's degree in Philosophy and Literature at the University of Warwick. Following that, she signed up to continue with Bath Spa University, taking their "Writing for Young People" master's degree, offered by the School of English and Creative Studies there.

As of 2012 Nicholls lives in Oxford. She is a regular at Quaker meetings including Young Friends General Meeting.

== Writing ==
=== Publications ===
Nicholls' first three novels all have death as the central theme.

Her first novel, Ways to Live Forever, was written during her time at Bath Spa. The story is that of an 11-year-old child called Sam who is dying of leukaemia (a form of cancer), written as the scrapbook of the child. This book was published by Marion Lloyd Books, part of Scholastic Press in January 2008. It was made into a movie of the same title released in 2010.

Her second book was Season of Secrets, based on a pagan summer god, or Green Man. This novel originally had the working titles The Green Man and The Midnight Hunter. It was published in April 2009.

Her third book, All Fall Down, is about a 14-year-old girl in the year of the Black Death, as she experiences the deaths of many of her family and neighbours, and struggles to save her surviving family. It was published in 2012, also by Marion Lloyd Books.

Her fourth book, Close Your Pretty Eyes , is about 11-year-old Olivia, who has spent most of her life in the care system, with many different foster parents, most of whom she has despised and treated badly. In the book Olivia believes that she encounters the ghost of Amelia Dyer, real 19th-century baby-farmer who murdered many of the babies she was paid to care for.

Her fifth book, An Island of Our Own, is about 12-year-old Holly, who with her older and younger brothers form a "a family in hardship". Motivated by Holly, they search for a buried treasure.

Nicholls contributed to Mystery & Mayhem by Egmont Publishing, published in May 2016 along with 11 other authors including Julia Golding, Katherine Woodfine, Clementine Beauvais, Elen Caldecott, Susie Day, Frances Hardinge, Caroline Lawrence, Helen Moss, Kate Pankhurst, Robin Stevens and Harriet Whitehorn.

Her sixth book, Things a Bright Girl Can Do, published in 2017, is a historical novel set in England between 1914 and 1918. It centres around three young women, their involvement with the Suffragette movement, and the effects of the Great War on their lives.

=== Recognition ===
- Orange New Voices children's prize 2006, for short-story All About Ella.
- Waterstone's Children's Book Prize 2008, for Ways to Live Forever. Presented to her by Children's Laureate, Michael Rosen on 13 February 2008.

In 2009, Nicholls won the Bolton Book Awards for Ways to Live Forever

- Glen Dimplex New Writer of the Year 2008, overall winner, for Ways to Live Forever. Nicholls was presented with the prize and a cheque for €20,000 by Martin Naughton on 10 November 2008 in Dublin.
- Die Zeit Luchs des Jahres 2008, for Wie man unsterblich wird – Jede Minute zählt (German language translation of Ways to Live Forever). The prize was presented on 11 February 2009 in Hamburg and shared with the translator Birgitt Kollmann.
- Ways to Live Forever (Wie man unsterblich wird) has been shortlisted for the 2009 Deutscher Jugendliteraturpreis.
- Ways To Live Forever was shortlisted for the Redbridge Book Awards 2009 as part of the children's nominees.
