= Ulrich Gebauer =

German actor

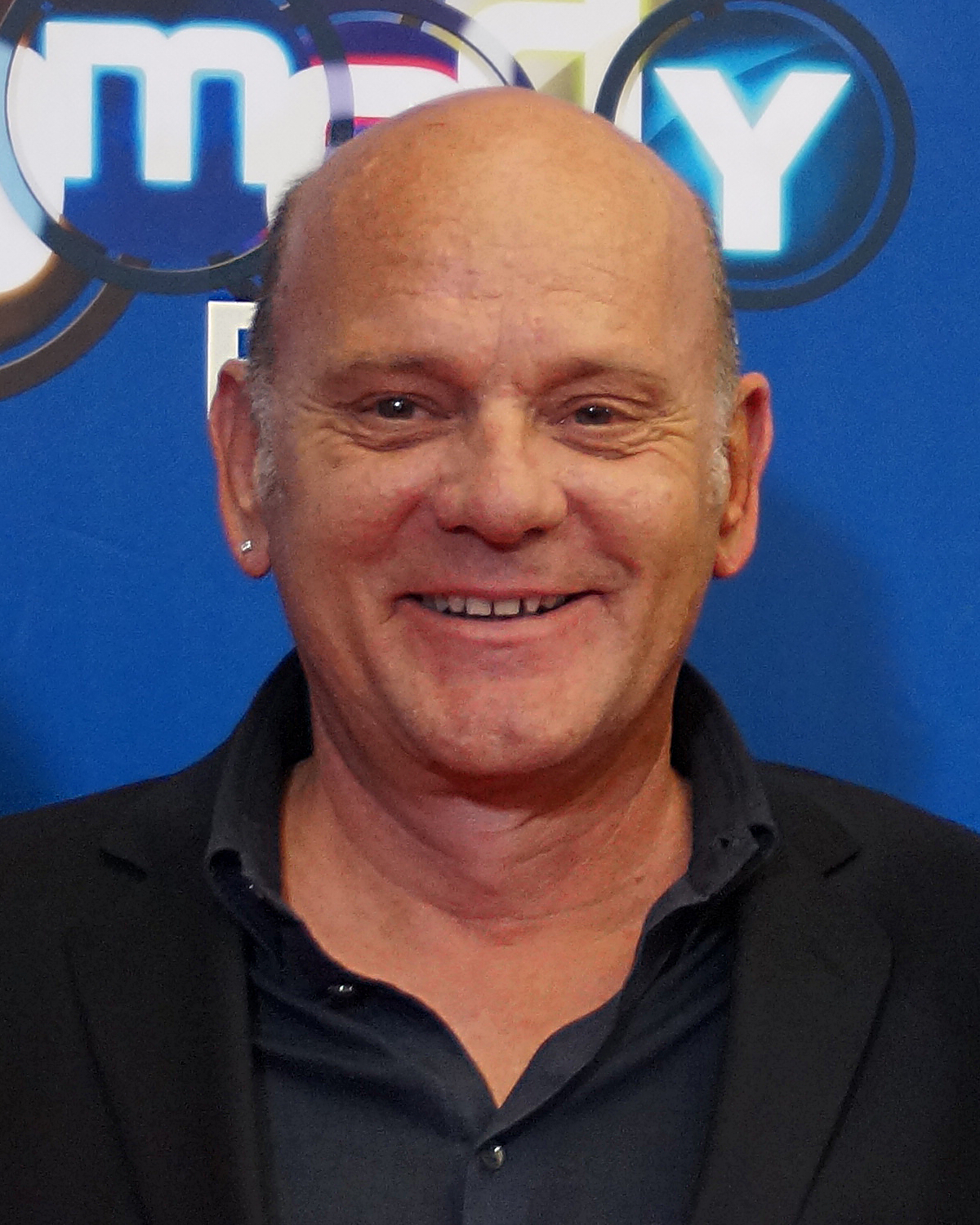
- Gebauer in 2016
- Born: 28 January 1956 (age 70); Lauffen am Neckar, Germany
- Occupation: Actor
- Years active: 1981–present

Ulrich Gebauer (born 28 January 1956) is a German actor. He has appeared in more than eighty films since 1981.

== Selected filmography ==
Year	Title	Role	Notes
2016	Gut zu Vögeln		
2012	Die Kirche bleibt im Dorf		
2007	Dr. Psycho	Horst Hendricks	Television series
2002	A Map of the Heart		
1988	The Cat	Ehser	
1981–1983	Die Knapp-Familie	Hans	Television series
