= Dominik Graf =

German film director (born 1952)

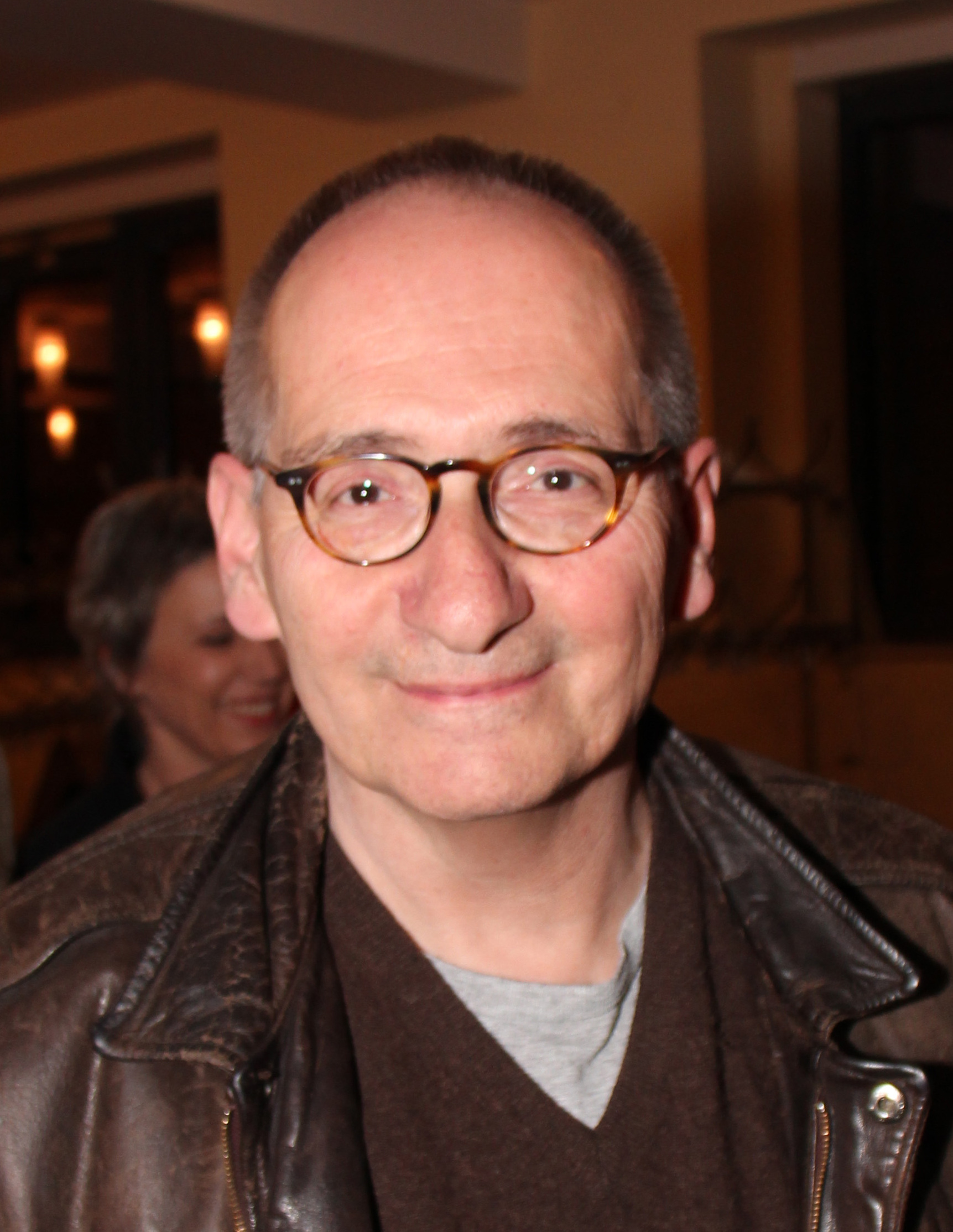
- Graf in 2011
- Born: 6 September 1952 (age 73); Munich, West Germany
- Occupation: Film director
- Years active: 1975–present

Dominik Graf (born 6 September 1952) is a German film director. He studied film direction at University of Television and Film Munich, graduating in 1975. While he has directed several theatrically released feature films since the 1980s, he more often finds work in television, focussing primarily on the genres police drama, thriller and crime mystery, although he has also made comedies, melodramas, documentaries and essay films. He is an active participant in public discourse about the values of genre film in Germany, with numerous articles and interviews published partially in book form.

Graf achieved international recognition in 2014 with his film Beloved Sisters, which was selected as the German entry for the Best Foreign Language Film at the 87th Academy Awards, but was not nominated.

== Selected filmography ==
=== Director ===
- 1975: Carlas Briefe
- 1979: Der kostbare Gast
- 1980: Der Familientag
- 1982: Neon City (anthology film)
- 1982: Second Sight
- 1983: Köberle kommt (TV series, 6 episodes)
- 1984: Treffer
- 1985: Drei gegen Drei
- 1985–1993: Der Fahnder (TV series, 12 episodes)
- 1986: Tatort – Schwarzes Wochenende (TV series episode)
- 1988: The Cat
- 1988: Bei Thea
- 1989: Tiger, Lion, Panther
- 1990: The Gamblers
- 1993: Morlock – Die Verflechtung (TV series episode)
- 1994: The Invincibles
- 1995: Tatort – Frau Bu lacht (TV series episode)
- 1996: Sperling und das Loch in der Wand (TV series episode)
- 1996: Reise nach Weimar
- 1997: The Scorpion
- 1997: Doktor Knock
- 1998: Sperling und der brennende Arm (TV series episode)
- 1999: Your Best Years
- 1999: Bitter Innocence
- 2002: A Map of the Heart
- 2002: Friends of Friends
- 2002: Hotte in Paradise
- 2004: Cold Spring
- 2004: Polizeiruf 110 – Der scharlachrote Engel (TV series episode)
- 2005: The Red Cockatoo
- 2006: City for Ransom
- 2006: Polizeiruf 110 – Er sollte tot (TV series episode)
- 2007: The Vow
- 2008: Kommissar Süden und der Luftgitarrist (TV series episode)
- 2009: Germany 09 – Der Weg, den wir nicht zusammen gehen
- 2010: Im Angesicht des Verbrechens (TV miniseries)
- 2011: Dreileben: Don't Follow Me Around
- 2011: Polizeiruf 110 – Cassandras Warnung (TV series episode)
- 2011: The Invisible Girl
- 2013: Tatort – Aus der Tiefe der Zeit (TV series episode)
- 2014: Beloved Sisters
- 2014: Wealthy Corpses: A Crime Story from Starnberg (TV series episode)
- 2014: Polizeiruf 110 – Smoke on the Water (TV series episode)
- 2016: Manhunt: Escape to the Carpathians
- 2016: Am Abend aller Tage
- 2017: Tatort – Der rote Schatten (TV series episode)
- 2018: Crossroads
- 2019: Polizeiruf 110 – Die Lüge, die wir Zukunft nennen (TV series episode)
- 2020: Tatort – In der Familie (TV series episode)
- 2021: Fabian: Going to the Dogs

Documentaries

- 1997: Denk ich an Deutschland … – Das Wispern im Berg der Dinge
- 2000: München – Geheimnisse einer Stadt
- 2012: Lawinen der Erinnerung (about Oliver Storz)
- 2014: Es werde Stadt! 50 Jahre Grimme-Preis in Marl
- 2015: Was heißt hier Ende? (about Michael Althen)
- 2016: Verfluchte Liebe deutscher Film (co-director: Johannes F. Sievert)
- 2017: Offene Wunde deutscher Film (co-director: Johannes F. Sievert)
- 2017: Philip Rosenthal – Der Unternehmer, der nicht an den Kapitalismus glaubte (about Philip Rosenthal)

=== Actor ===
- Maiden's War (1977), as Pavel Sixta
- 1+1=3 [de] (1979), as Bernhard Grabowski
- Danni (1983), as Lothar
- Father's Day (1996), as Lorenz

== Prizes ==
- 1980 – Bayerischer Filmpreis in the category Young talents for Der kostbare Gast, his dissertation film at filmschool
- 1983 – Brussels International Fantastic Film Festival: Special prize Second Sight
- 1988 – Filmband in Gold (best director) für The Cat
- 1989 – Fernsehfilmpreis der Deutschen Akademie der Darstellenden Künste for Tiger, Lion, Panther
- 1993 – Goldener Gong for Morlock – Die Verflechtung
- 1995 – Goldener Gong for Tatort: Frau Bu lacht
- 1997 – Grimme-Preis for Sperling und das Loch in der Wand (zusammen mit Benedict Neuenfels)
- 1998 – Bayerischer Fernsehpreis, Special prize for the TV films The Scorpion, Dr. Knock and Das Wispern im Berg der Dinge
- 1998 – Grimme-Preis for Doktor Knock
- 1998 – Telestar for The Scorpion
- 1998 – Fernsehfilmpreis der Deutschen Akademie der Darstellenden Künste for The Scorpion
- 1999 – Fernsehfilmpreis der Deutschen Akademie der Darstellenden Künste for Sperling und der brennende Arm
- 1999 – Grimme-Preis for Denk ich an Deutschland… – Das Wispern im Berg der Dinge
- 2003 – Grimme-Preis for Friends of Friends
- 2003 – Filmpreis der Stadt Hof
- 2004 – Deutscher Fernsehpreis for Cold Spring
- 2004 – Hans Abich Preis for extraordinary achievement in television drama
- 2005 – DIVA-Award – Beste Regieleistung des Jahres (Jurypreis)
- 2006 – Grimme-Preis Gold for Polizeiruf 110 – Der scharlachrote Engel
- 2007 – At Madrid Móstoles International Film Festival – Best director for The Red Cockatoo
- 2007 – Grimme-Preis for Polizeiruf 110: Er sollte tot
- 2007 – Fernsehfilmpreis der Deutschen Akademie der Darstellenden Künste: Special prize for feature film direction for City for Ransom
- 2008 – Grimme-Preis for City for Ransom
- 2008 – Filmkunstpreis for The Vow beim Festival des deutschen Films
- 2010 – Grimme-Preis for Kommissar Süden und der Luftgitarrist
- 2010 – Schwabinger Kunstpreis
- 2010 – Star on the Boulevard of Stars in Berlin
- 2011 – Grimme-Preis for Im Angesicht des Verbrechens
- 2011 – Bayerischer Fernsehpreis for Im Angesicht des Verbrechens
- 2011 – Deutscher Regiepreis Metropolis in the category best television director for Im Angesicht des Verbrechens
- 2012 – Grimme-Preis Spezial for Dreileben
- 2012 – Hamburger Krimipreis for Polizeiruf 110: Cassandras Warnung

== Writings ==
- Dominik Graf: Verstörung im Kino. Der Regisseur von Die Sieger im Gespräch mit Stefan Stosch über die Arbeit am Film. Wehrhahn Verlag, Laatzen 1998, 47 S., ISBN 3-932324-51-X
- Dominik Graf: Schläft ein Lied in allen Dingen. Texte zum Film. Hrsg. und mit einem Vorwort von Michael Althen. Alexander Verlag, Berlin 2009, ISBN 978-3-89581-210-1
- Dominik Graf: Im Angesicht des Verbrechens. Fernseharbeit am Beispiel einer Fernsehserie. Hrsg. Johannes F. Sievert. Alexander Verlag, Berlin 2010, ISBN 978-3-89581-221-7
- Dominik Graf, Lisa Gotto: Kino unter Druck. Filmkultur hinter dem Eisernen Vorhang. Alexander Verlag, Berlin 2021, ISBN 978-3-89581-548-5
