= Lisa Gotto =

German professor

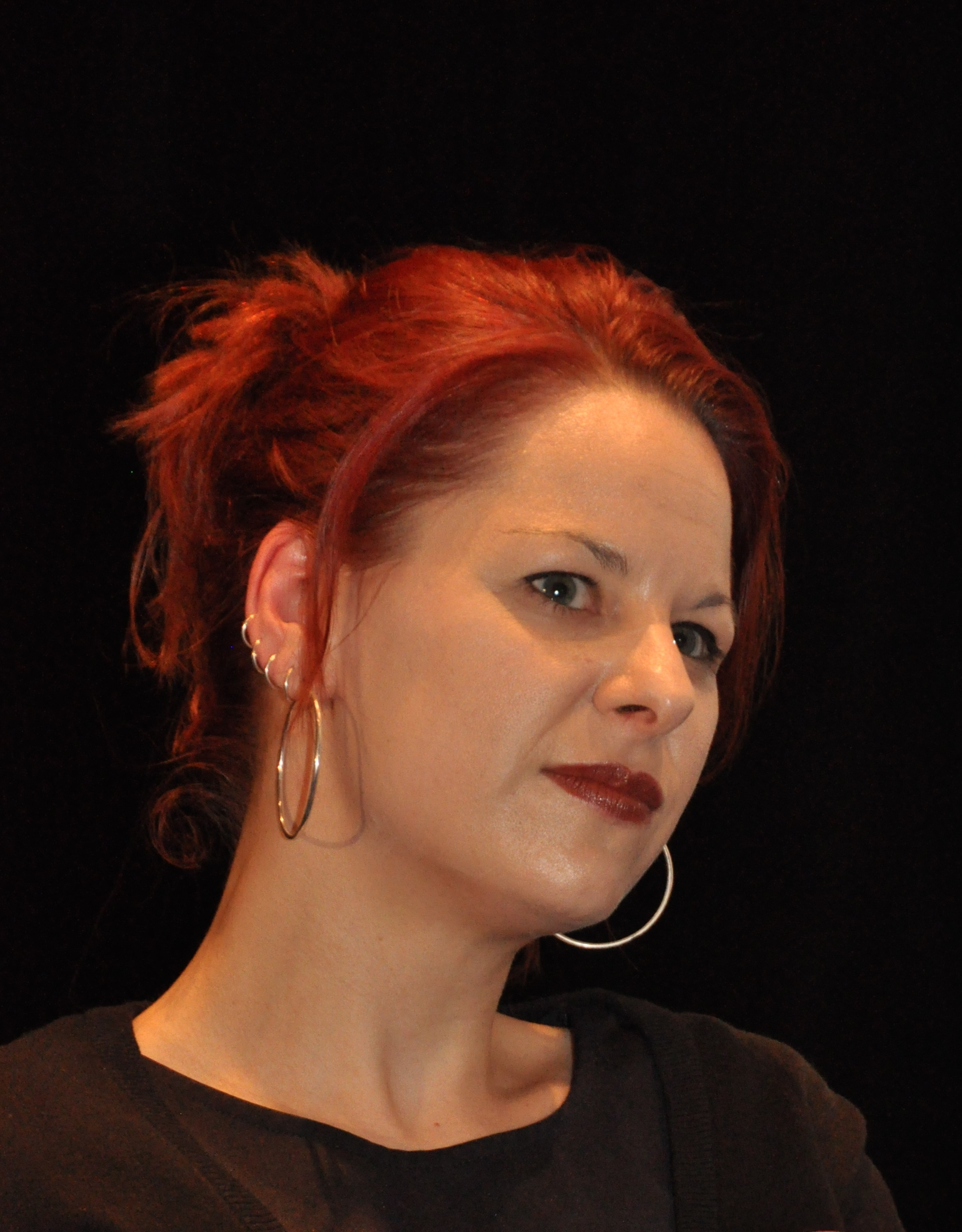
Lisa Gotto

Lisa Gotto (born 1976) is a professor of film theory at the University of Vienna. She was previously a professor of film studies at the Internationale Filmschule Köln and a professor of media and game studies at the Cologne Game Lab at the Technical University of Cologne. Gotto specializes in film studies, game studies and media studies.

== Biography ==
- Lisa Gotto graduated from the University of Cologne with an M.A. in theatre, film and television studies, German literature, and English literature in 2001, and earned a Ph.D. from Bauhaus University Weimar in media studies in 2006. From 2001 to 2007 she was a research and teaching assistant at Bauhaus University Weimar and the University of Television and Film Munich, from 2007 to 2010 she was an assistant professor at University of Regensburg, from 2009 to 2010 she was a Deputy Professor at University of Mannheim. In 2010, she was appointed professor for Film Studies (Film History/Film Analysis) at Internationale Filmschule Köln which she held until 2018. From 2011 to 2012, she was a visiting professor at the Institute for Culture and Aesthetics of Digital Media at Leuphana University of Lüneburg, and from 2016 to 2018, she was a professor for Media and Game Studies at the Cologne Game Lab at Technical University of Cologne. In 2018, she was also a Research Fellow at the Center for Advanced Internet Studies (CAIS). Since 2018, she has been a Professor of Film Theory at the University of Vienna. Lisa Gotto's main research interests are in media history and media theory, film studies, and digital media culture. She has published extensively on film theory and film aesthetics, media history, and visual culture. She is the co-founder and co-editor of the journal Medienkomparatistik, and the co-founder and co-editor of the book series Studies of Digital Media Culture.

== Selected writings ==
- Starring Asian Femininities: Subverting the Gaze, Reclaiming the Frame. Ed. Ian Dixon, Kirsty Fairclough, Lisa Gotto, Angelene Wong. London, New York: Bloomsbury 2026.
- Big Screens, Small Forms. Visual Varieties in Digital Media Culture. Bielefeld: transcript 2022.
- Passing and Posing between Black and White. Calibrating the Color Line in U.S. Cinema. Bielefeld: transcript 2021.
- "Strike a Pose: Robot Selfies", in Exploring the Selfie. Historical, Analytical and Theoretical Approaches to Digital Self-Photography ed. Julia Eckel, Jens Ruchatz and Sabine Wirth. Basingstoke: Palgrave Macmillan 2018.
- "Fantastic Views. Super Heroes, Visual Perception and Digital Perspective", in Superhero Synergies. Comic Book Heroes Go Digital ed. James Gilmore, Matthias Stork, Lanham: Rowman & Littlefield 2014.
- "Types and Bytes: Ludic Seriality and Digital Typography", Eludamos. Journal for Computer Game Culture 8 (1), 2014.
- "Incorporations: On the Mediality of Arnold Schwarzenegger's Cinematically Built Bodies", in Arnold Schwarzenegger. Interdisciplinary Perspectives on Body and Images ed. Michael Butter et al. Heidelberg: UV Winter 2011.
- "Life in a Day / One Day on Earth. Visuality and Visibility in the Digital Arena", International Journal of the Image 1 (2), 2011.
- Eisenstein-Reader ed. Lisa Gotto with a foreword by Dominik Graf. Henschel, Leipzig 2011.
