= Deutscher Hörbuchpreis =

German literary prize

Deutscher Hörbuchpreis (German Audiobook Prize) is a literary prize of Germany.

== Best of all ==
- 2003: Isaak Babel: Die Reiterarmee. Red Cavalry
- 2004: Flann O'Brien: Auf Schwimmen-zwei-Vögel. At Swim-Two-Birds Kein & Aber Records, Zürich, read by Harry Rowohlt
- 2005:
  - Peter Märthesheimer: Krupp oder Die Erfindung des bürgerlichen Zeitalters. Der Audioverlag, Berlin, Speakers: Udo Schenk, Ulrich Noethen and others, Director: Norbert Schaeffer, Production: Westdeutscher Rundfunk
  - Robert Musil: Der Mann ohne Eigenschaften, Remix. Der Hörverlag, München, Konzeption und Manuskript: Katarina Agathos und Herbert Kapfer, Director: Klaus Buhlert, Speakers: Manfred Zapatka, Ulrich Matthes, Susanne Wolf and others, Production: Bayerischer Rundfunk with cooperation of Robert-Musil-Institut, Klagenfurt
- 2006: Dylan Thomas: Unter dem Milchwald. Der Hörverlag, München, Director: Götz Fritsch, Sprecher: Harry Rowohlt, Boris Aljinovic, Hilmar Thate, Irm Hermann, Ursula Karusseit, Ulrike Krumbiegel, Winfried Glatzeder, Fritz Lichtenhahn, Gerd Baltus and others, Music: Peter Kaizar, Production: Mitteldeutscher Rundfunk 2003
