= Antonio Gotto =

American cardiologist

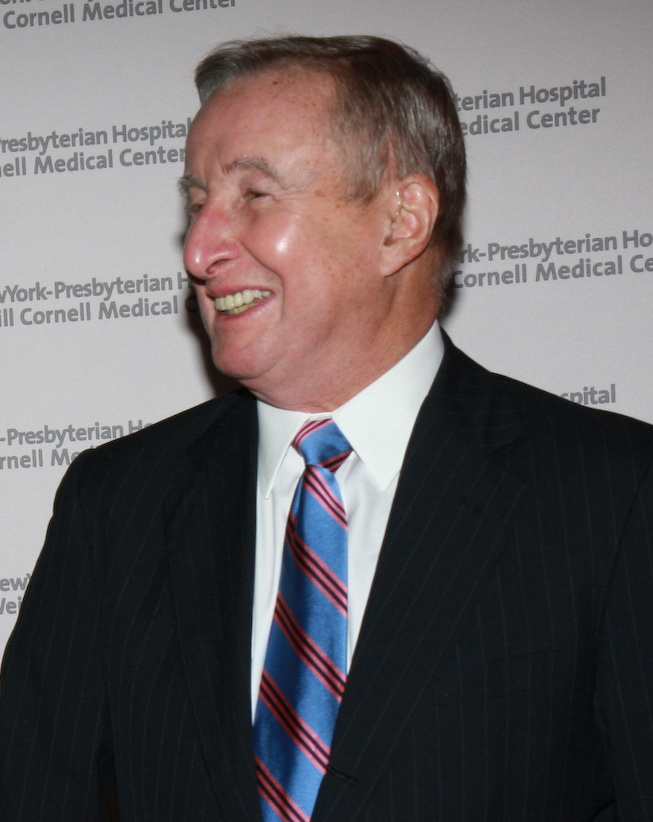
Gotto in October 2009

Antonio M. Gotto, Jr. was Dean of Weill Medical College of Cornell University. He was succeeded by Laurie H. Glimcher in January 2012. Prior to his appointment in 1997, Gotto was chairman of the department of internal medicine at Baylor College of Medicine for 20 years, where he collaborated extensively with Michael DeBakey. Gotto is best known for his research into blood lipids. As administrator, he presided over an enormous growth at Cornell, an affiliation with Houston Methodist Hospital when it separated from Baylor, and a deepening of Cornell's longtime affiliation with New York Hospital following its merger with Columbia Presbyterian to form the New York-Presbyterian Hospital.

Gotto obtained his bachelor's degree from Vanderbilt University in 1957. He then attended Oxford University as a Rhodes Scholar where he received a D.Phil. degree in 1961. He subsequently graduated from Vanderbilt's medical school in 1965. In the field of atherosclerosis, his basic science research interests include clinical disorders of lipid transport and the structure, metabolism, and function of lipoproteins and apolipoproteins. He and his associates were the first to achieve complete synthesis of a plasma apolipoprotein (apo C-I); they also determined the complete cDNA and amino acid sequence of apo B-100, one of the largest proteins ever sequenced and a key protein in atherosclerosis. Gotto has played a leading role in several landmark clinical trials demonstrating that cholesterol-lowering drug treatment can reduce the risk for heart disease.

A lifelong supporter of educational efforts aimed at cardiovascular risk reduction, Gotto has been National President of the American Heart Association and President of the International Atherosclerosis Society. He is a member of the Institute of Medicine and the American Academy of Arts and Sciences and a recipient of many honors. Gotto has contributed more than 500 scholarly articles and books to the medical literature, and he is coauthor of a series of books (The Living Heart series) that explain the origins and treatment of cardiovascular disease to the general public. Gotto has been on the editorial boards of numerous academic publications, including a senior editor of The Medical Roundtable, Cardiovascular Edition, a peer-reviewed journal publishing expert roundtable discussions on compelling topics.

He lives in New York City and Houston, Texas.
