= Makatsch =

Makatsch is a surname. Notable people with the surname include:

- Heike Makatsch (born 1971), German actress and singer
- Rainer Makatsch (born 1946), German ice hockey player
- Wolfgang Makatsch (1906–1983), German ornithologist and oologist
