= Detlev Buck =

German film director, actor, screenwriter and film producer

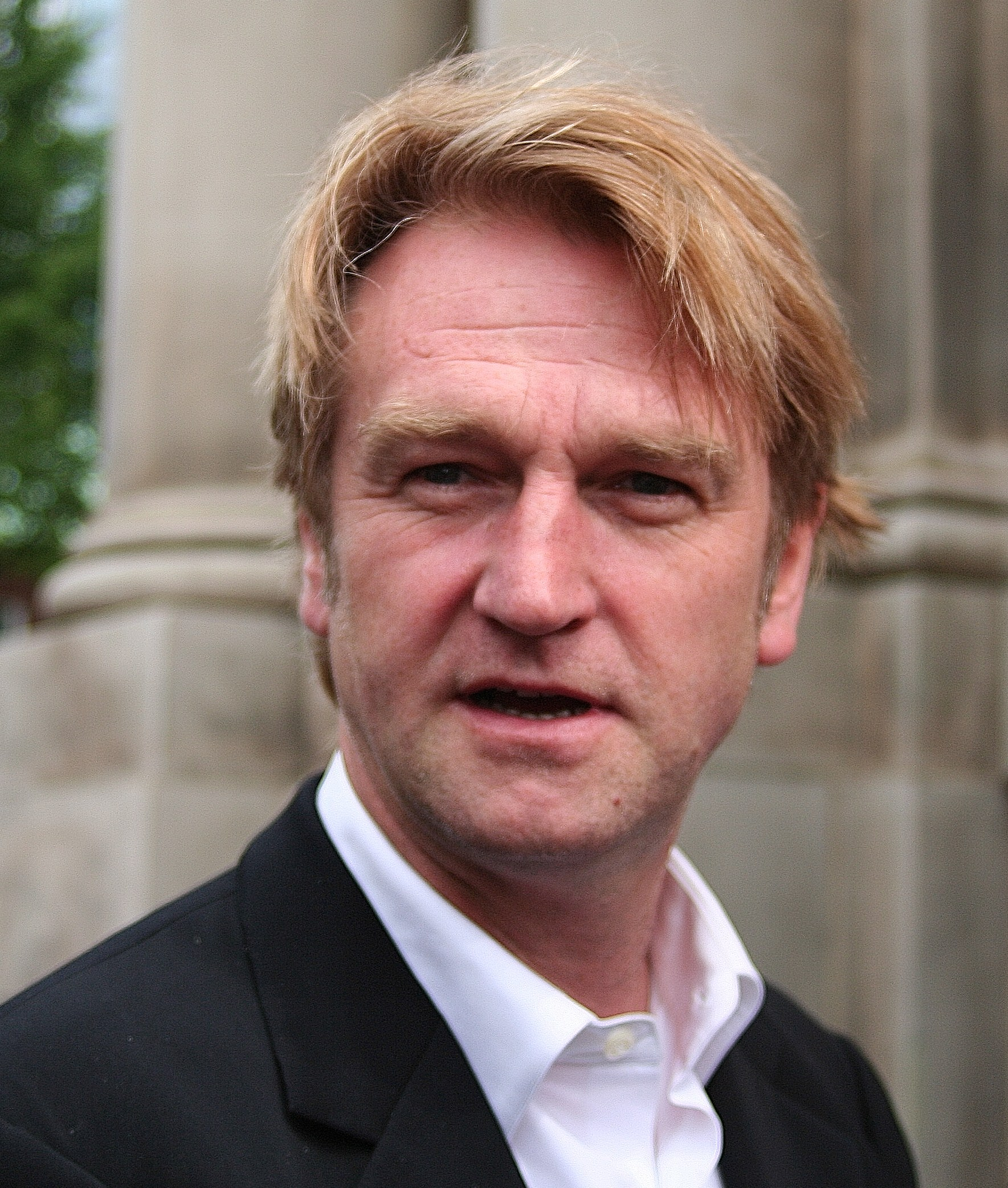
- Detlev Buck in 2010
- Born: 1 December 1962 (age 63); Bad Segeberg, West Germany
- Occupations: Film director, actor
- Years active: 1982–present
- Awards: 1991 Bavarian Film Awards; 2007 Bavarian Film Award, Best Young People's Film

Detlev Buck (German: [ˈdɛt.lɛf bʊk]; born 1 December 1962 in Bad Segeberg) is a German film director, actor, producer and screenwriter.

== Life and work ==
Buck made his first short film, Work and Leisure, in 1982, and his first feature, Karniggels, in 1991. He often makes cameo appearances in his work. He has appeared in a number of films; his most notable role was in Michael Haneke's The White Ribbon. Buck lives in Berlin.

== Selected filmography ==
As director

- 1984: Work and Leisure
- 1991: Karniggels (with Bernd Michael Lade, Ingo Naujoks and Julia Jäger)
- 1993: No More Mr. Nice Guy (with Joachim Król, Horst Krause and Sophie Rois)
- 1996: Jailbirds (with Til Schweiger, Marie Bäumer and Heike Makatsch)
- 1999: Love Your Neighbour! (with Moritz Bleibtreu and Heike Makatsch)
- 2000: Bundle of Joy (with Anke Engelke)
- 2006: Tough Enough (with David Kross)
- 2007: Hands off Mississippi (Family film)
- 2009: Same Same but Different (with Apinya Sakuljaroensuk and David Kross)
- 2011: Woman in Love (with Matthias Schweighöfer and Alexandra Maria Lara)
- 2012: Measuring the World (Adaptation of the book of the same name)
- 2014: Bibi & Tina (Family film)
- 2014: Bibi & Tina: Bewildered and Bewitched (Family film)
- 2016: Bibi & Tina: Girls vs. Boys (Family film)
- 2017: Bibi & Tina: Perfect Pandemonium (Family film)
- 2018: Asphaltgorillas
- 2018: Wuff – Folge dem Hund
- 2020: Christmas Crossfire
- 2021: Confessions of Felix Krull

As actor

- 1984: Work and Leisure (Short) ... Gerhard Ramm
- 1994: Back to Square One - Dir. Reinhard Münster (with Katharina Thalbach and Harald Juhnke) ... Chauffeur
- 1995: Under the Milky Way - Dir. Matthias X. Oberg (with Fabian Busch and Sophie Rois) ... Instructor
- 1996: Jailbirds (with Til Schweiger, Marie Bäumer and Heike Makatsch) ... Hammer-Gerd
- 1999: Sonnenallee - Dir. Leander Haußmann (with Alexander Beyer, Henry Hübchen, Robert Stadlober, Katharina Thalbach) ... Policeman Horkefeld
- 1999: Aimée & Jaguar - Dir. Max Färberböck (with Maria Schrader and Juliane Köhler) ... Günther Wust
- 2000: Bundle of Joy (with Anke Engelke) ... Wusch
- 2002: Blue Moon - Dir. Andrea Maria Dusl (with Josef Hader) ... Ignaz Springer
- 2003: Berlin Blues - Dir. Leander Haußmann (with Christian Ulmen) ... Karl
- 2005: NVA - Dir. Leander Haußmann ... Colonel Kalt
- 2005: Intrigue and Love - Dir. Leander Haußmann ... Wurm
- 2007: Midsummer Madness - Dir. Alexander Hahn ... Axel
- 2009: The White Ribbon - Dir. Michael Haneke ... Eva's father
- 2009: 12 Paces Without a Head - Dir. Sven Taddicken ... Arms Dealer
- 2009: Contact High - Dir. Michael Glawogger ... Harry
- 2011: Woman in Love (with Matthias Schweighöfer and Alexandra Lara) ... Jürgen Honk
- 2012: The Marriage Swindler and His Wife - Dir. Manfred Stelzer ... Sigi Krugschenk
- 2012: Waiting for the Sea - Dir. Bakhtyar Khudojnazarov (with Egor Beroev and Anastasiya Mikulchina) ... Balthazar
- 2013: Shark Alarm at Müggel Lake ... Policeman Müller
- 2014: Bibi & Tina ... Dr. Eichhorn
- 2014: The Man Cave - Dir. Franziska Meyer Price ... Helmut
- 2014: Bibi & Tina: Bewildered and Bewitched ... Dr. Eichhorn
- 2016: Bibi & Tina: Girls vs. Boys ... Dr. Eichhorn
- 2017: Bibi & Tina: Perfect Pandemonium ... Dr. Eichhorn
- 2017: Teenosaurus Rex - Dir. Leander Haußmann ... Holger
- 2017: Magical Mystery or: The Return of Karl Schmidt
- 2020: Lindenberg! Mach dein Ding - Dir. Hermine Huntgeburth ... Mattheisen
- 2025: Amrum - Dir. Fatih Akin ... Sam Gangsters

== Awards ==
- 1991 Bavarian Film Awards, Best New Director
- 1993 43rd Berlin International Film Festival Wir können auch anders … - Honourable Mention.
- 2007 Bavarian Film Award, Best Young People's Film
