= Teresa Weißbach =

German actress (born 1981)

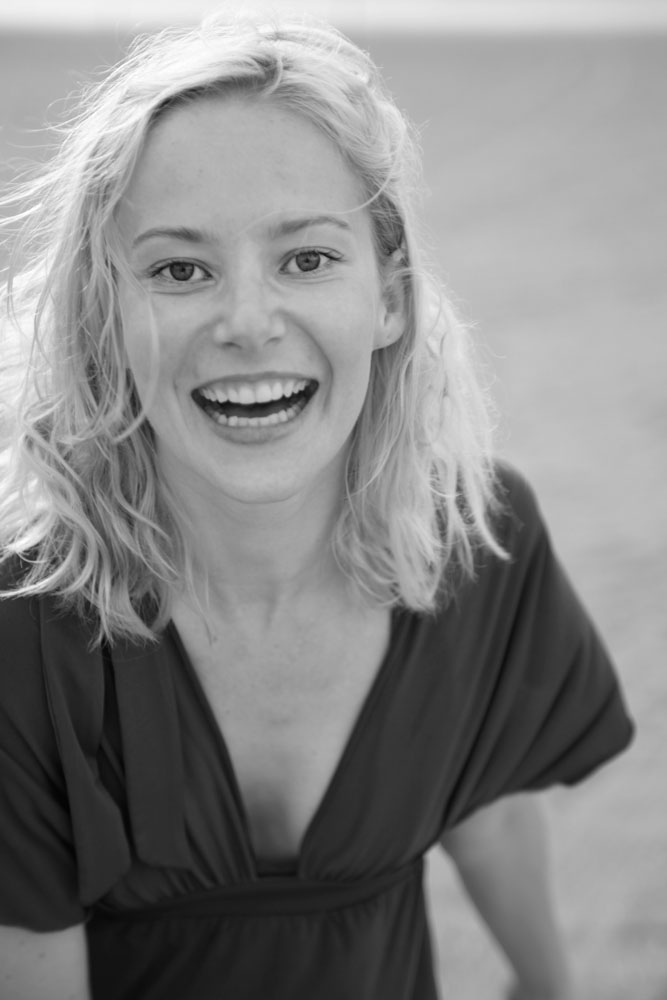
- Weißbach in 2010
- Born: 26 April 1981 (age 44); Zwickau, Bezirk Karl-Marx-Stadt, East Germany
- Occupation: Actress
- Website: http://www.schauspielervideos.de/fullprofile/schauspielerin-teresa-weissbach.html

Teresa Weißbach (born 26 April 1981 in Zwickau, Bezirk Karl-Marx-Stadt, East Germany) is a German actress best known for her role as Miriam in the 1999 film Sonnenallee.

== Biography ==
She grew up in Stollberg, and at 10 years old joined the Youth Theater.

At 17 she made her debut as Miriam Sommer in the film Sonnenallee. Her parents own a bakery in Stollberg, and made special pastry in celebration of the success of Sonnenallee in cinemas.

From 1999 to 2003 she studied at the University for Music and Theater in Rostock and was awarded a degree in acting. During her studies, she performed at the Volkstheater in Rostock, and at the Mecklenburg State Theatre in Schwerin, playing, among other roles, Ismene in the tragedy Antigone by Sophocles.

In 2002 she performed in the ARD television series Berlin, Berlin. In summer 2004 she trod the boards at the Bayreuth Festival, and in February 2005 she began an engagement at the Burgtheater in Vienna.

== Filmography ==
- Sonnenallee (dir Leander Haußmann, 1999)
- Barbecue Ladies (dir. Tini Tüllmann, 2002, Short)
- About a Girl (dir. Catharina Deus, 2004)
- Abgefahren (dir. Jakob Schäuffelen, 2004)
- Sonst ist alles so groß (dir. Nic Niemann, 2005, Short)
- Sommerwald (dir. Christoph Lehmann, 2006, Short)
- Armee der Stille – La Isla Bonita (dir. Roland Lang, 2009)
- Fresh Breeze (dir. Imogen Kimmel, 2009)
