= Ezard Haußmann =

German actor (1935–2010)

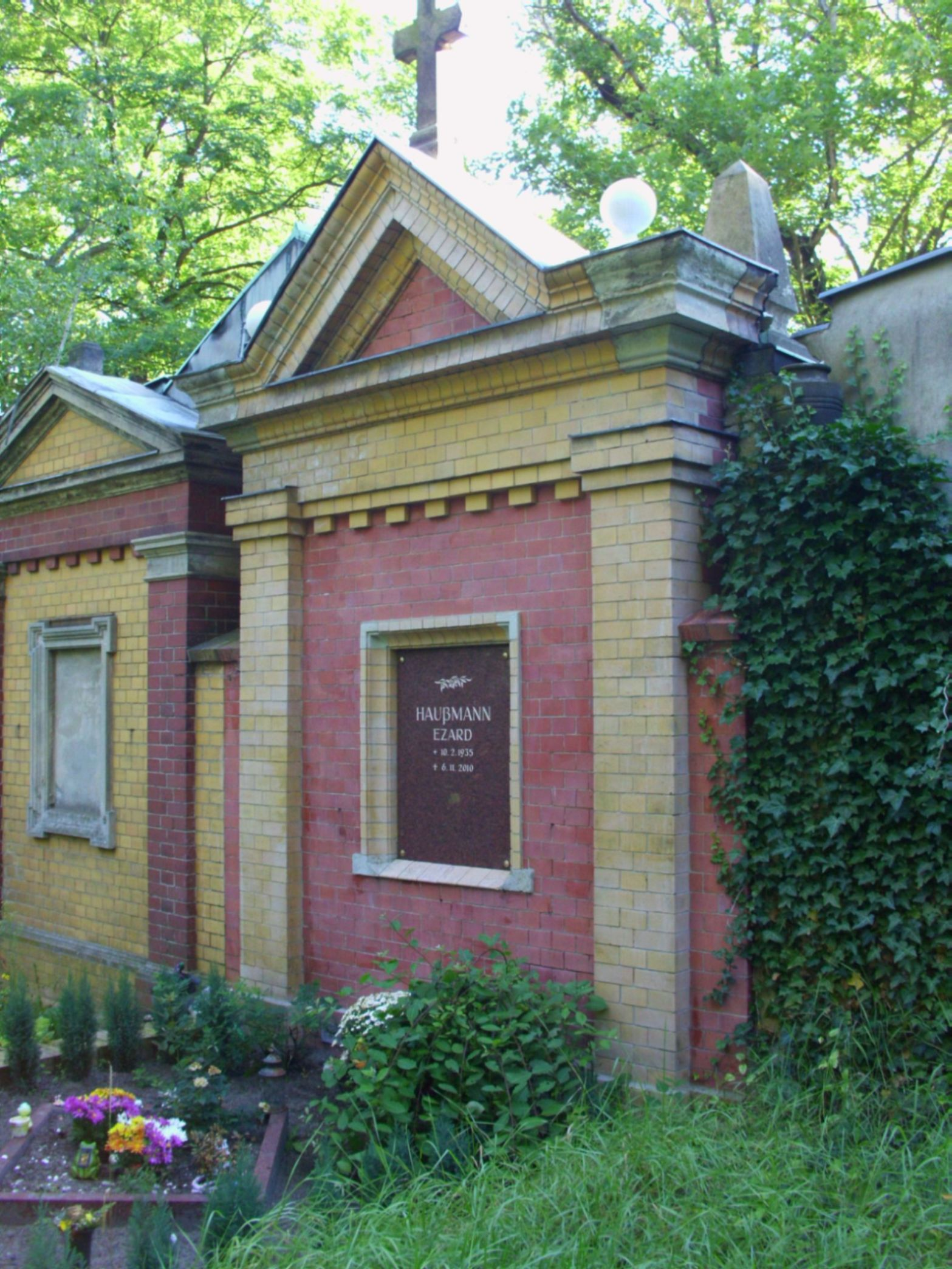
- Grave of Ezard Haußmann in the cemetery Berlin-Friedrichshagen (Germany)
- Born: 10 February 1935; Berlin
- Died: 6 November, 2010; Berlin
- Occupation(s): stage, television and film actor

Ezard Haußmann (10 February 1935 – 6 November 2010) was a German stage, television and film actor. He and costume designer Doris Haußmann were the parents of film director Leander Haußmann. Haußmann appeared in several of his son's films, with including Sonnenallee in 1999 and NVA in 2005.

Haußmann was born in Berlin on 10 February 1935 to Eric Haußmann, an actor, and Ruth Wenger. He appeared in his first theater role at the age of 18.

Ezard Haußmann died of a brain tumor on 6 November 2010 at his home in Berlin, Germany, at the age of 75.
