= Hotel Lux (film) =

- Directed by: Leander Haußmann
- Written by: Leander Haußmann from themes by Uwe Timm and Volker Einrauch
- Produced by: Corinna Eich; Matthias Esche; Günther Rohrbach
- Starring: Michael Herbig; Jürgen Vogel; Thekla Reuten
- Cinematography: Hagen Bogdanski
- Edited by: Hansjörg Weißbrich
- Music by: Ralf Wengenmayr
- Distributed by: Bavaria Film
- Release date: 27 October 2011 (Germany)
- Running time: 110 minutes
- Country: Germany
- Languages: German; Russian

Hotel Lux is a 2011 German black comedy film directed by Leander Haußmann. It begins in Nazi Germany and moves to the Soviet Union. Featuring the main character Hans Zeisig, an apolitical comedian, the picture involves him with numerous historical facts and figures of this era.

== Plot ==
In 1933, as Adolf Hitler and the Nazis come to power in Germany, actor and comedian Hans Zeisig (Michael Herbig) and his partner, Siggi Meyer (Jürgen Vogel), have a successful comedy act at a Berlin cabaret doing impersonations of Joseph Stalin and Adolf Hitler. Meyer is politically active in the Communist Party and is thus endangered by the Nazis' power grab, but through him, Zeisig meets the attractive Dutch communist Frida (Thekla Reuten).

The situation continues to deteriorate in Germany. Audiences grow dour, and the theater management has to comply with the prevailing Gleichschaltung. Kristallnacht occurs. Zeisig refuses to perform the defamatory act of the stereotyped Jew. He instead goes onstage clad as Hitler and satirizes him, knowing he will have to flee. Zeisig learns Meyer has been arrested and deported to Oranienburg concentration camp. Equipped with a forged passport, a fake beard and an assumed name, Zeisig leaves Germany and eventually enters the Soviet Union. In Moscow, he arrives at the Hotel Lux (a historic hotel in Moscow, where many exiled German communists sought shelter during the Nazi era).

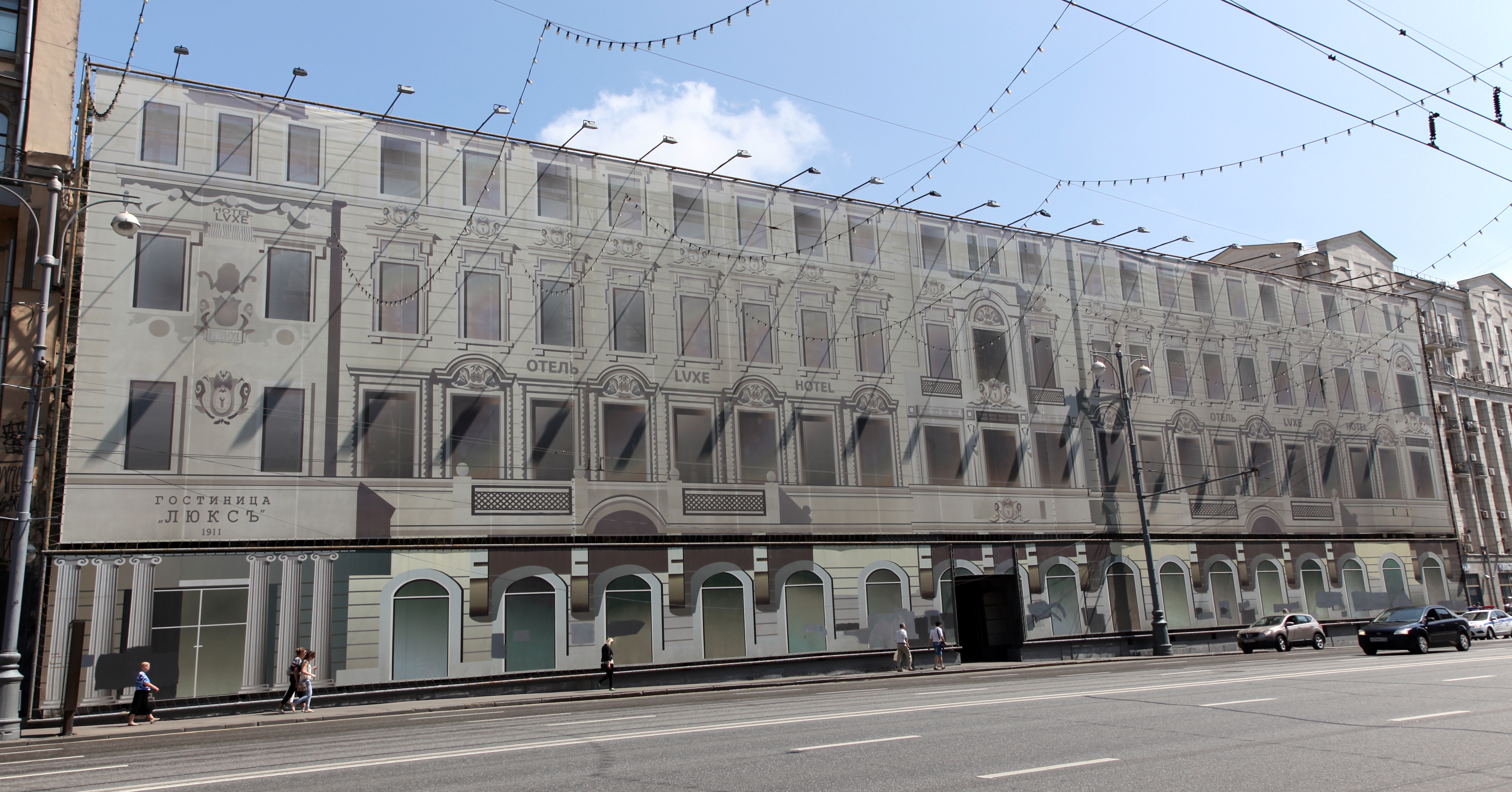
The Hotel Lux building as seen in 2013

Zeisig encounters Frida, who under a different name, has an important position in the exiled German Communist Party. He also encounters numerous historical figures, such as Walter Ulbricht, Herbert Wehner and others, who later became important political figures in East Germany. The apolitical Zeisig has landed in a hotbed of political intrigue; all important conversations are held with the water running to shield them from the ubiquitous bugs.

Taken for a ride to Stalin's residence, he learns his assumed identity is that of Jan Hansen, Hitler's astrological advisor, a person of great interest to Stalin. Hansen arrives at the residence as they are talking, but Zeisig successfully convinces the KGB agents that he is Hansen and improvises astrological advice as Hansen is taken away.

Zeisig wonders if he is in more danger at the Moscow hotel than he was in Nazi Germany. However, he continues learning Russian, attending party meetings and learning astrology to pass on to Stalin. With Stalin's Great Purge underway, Zeisig realizes that his life depends on his ability to placate the leader. Some German Communists are taken away for supporting Leon Trotsky.

Meyer arrives and collaborates with Zeisig and Frida. However his name appears in a list of political dissidents which Hitler asked Stalin to deport back to Germany. Zeisig helps Meyer escape the police but is arrested in the process. Zeisig and Frida narrowly escape being shot by Nikolai Yezhov when the latter is arrested by the KGB.

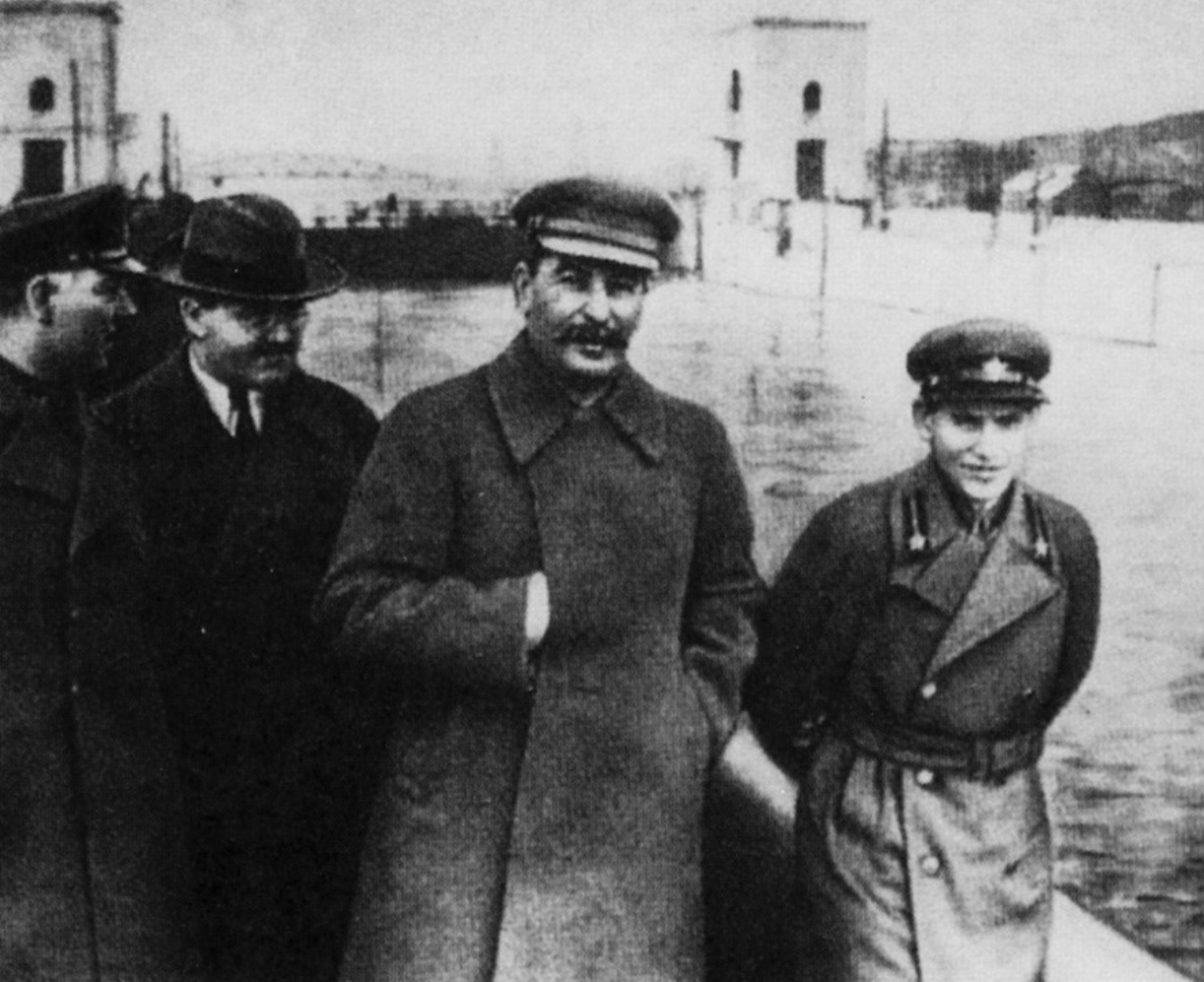
During Yezhov's arrest in the film, he is shown holding this famous historical image and seeing himself disappear from it.

Stalin has figured out Zeisig's shams and goes personally to confront him at his hotel room, armed guards in tow. He mentions that the German foreign minister, Joachim von Ribbentrop, is visiting to sign a non aggression pact and asks him about whether or not he can trust Hitler.

Suddenly, Meyer appears, decked in a Hitler costume, distracting Stalin, allowing Zeisig to knock him unconscious. He takes Stalin's clothes and his mustache. The two men, imitating the leaders as they did in their show, walk out of the hotel to gasping onlookers. They direct their driver to take them to the airport and escape Moscow, intending to fly to America along with Frida.

At a different runway, Ribbentrop arrives and is surprised to hear that Hitler has already landed and begun discussions personally, as Meyer and Zeisig's plane flies over them. Back at the hotel, Stalin attempts to identify himself but is ridiculed by guests due to his lack of hair and mustache.

In a post-credits scene, Zeisig notes that in the real-life photo of the meeting between Stalin and Ribbentrop, Stalin's mustache is crooked.

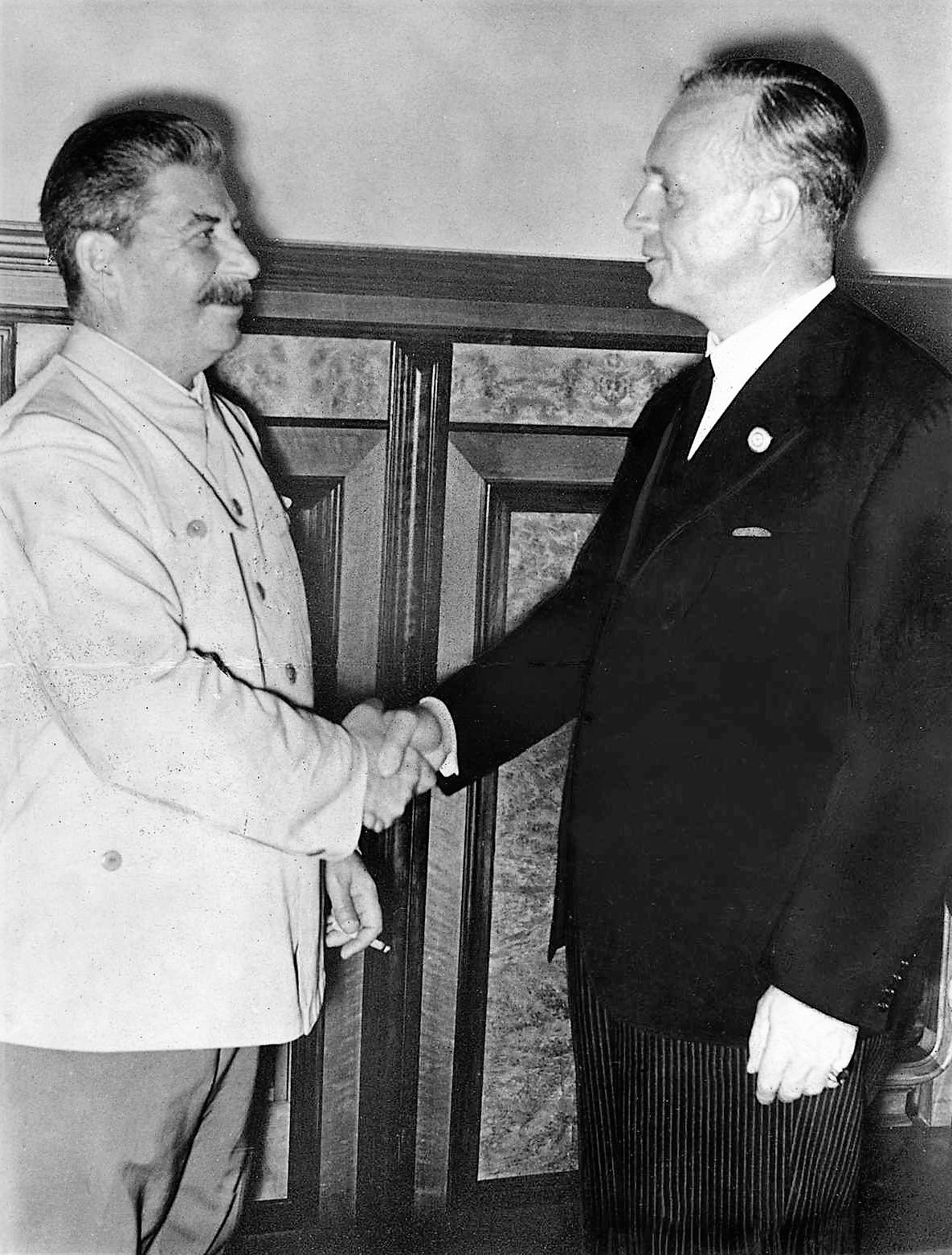
The signing of the Molotov-Ribbentrop pact

== Background ==
The film's director, Leander Haußmann, grew up under communism in Quedlinburg, Saxony-Anhalt. The film is dedicated to the director's late father, Ezard Haußmann.

Hotel Lux was in pre-production more than four years; the script was worked on by two screenwriters. Herbig, a popular comedian, actor, and director known as a perfectionist, required more changes before he would sign on. He found the first versions of the script to be "too dramatic, too brutal," but joined the production after a lighter tone was reached. Herbig said he could finally relate to the character, a clueless comedian.

At the Rome Film Festival 2011, German distributor Bavaria Film sold the film to Italian distributor Archibald Films.

== Reception ==
Luckily, Herbig has personality with a capital "P," and the popular spoofer has great fun channeling the aura of stars from cinema's past. The same can be said of Haussmann's entire concept, utilizing devices from another era including elaborate studio sets, matte paintings, dolly shots and the like. It's playfully old-fashioned and visually pleasing

— Jay Weissberg – Variety

Hotel Lux is an entertainingly meandering historical comedy that begins in Nazi Germany in 1933 and moves to the Soviet Union five years later. Oscillating between drama and farce, the film boasts rich cinematography and elaborate historical production design.

— Palm Springs International Film Society – Palm Springs International Film Festival

== Accolades ==
The official German film evaluation institution Deutsche Film- und Medienbewertung rated Hotel Lux as "especially valuable" (besonders wertvoll), the highest rating possible.

== Historical references ==
The production company has released teaching materials related to the film.

=== Notable figures portrayed or mentioned (selection) ===
- Johannes R. Becher
- Lavrentiy Beria
- Nikolai Bukharin
- Adolf Hitler
- Lotte Kühn
- Vyacheslav Molotov
- Wilhelm Pieck
- Herbert Wehner (alias Kurt Funk)
- Joseph Stalin
- Leon Trotsky
- Walter Ulbricht
- Vasiliy Ulrikh
- Joachim von Ribbentrop
- Nikolai Yezhov

=== Other historical references (selection) ===
- Great Purge
- Hotel Lux
- Kristallnacht
- Lubyanka Building
- Machtergreifung
- Treaty between Hitler and Stalin
- Berlin Wall
- Retouched photo with Stalin and Nikolai Yezhov

== See also ==
- You Nazty Spy!
- I'll Never Heil Again
- The Great Dictator (1940)
- To Be or Not to Be (1942)
- Der Fuehrer's Face
- La Grande Vadrouille
- To Be or Not to Be (remake, 1983)
- Life Is Beautiful (1997)
