= Am kürzeren Ende der Sonnenallee =

1999 book by Thomas Brussig

The Shorter End of Sun Avenue
- Author: Thomas Brussig
- Original title: Am kürzeren Ende der Sonnenallee
- Language: German
- Genre: Comic, Historical
- Publisher: Volk & Welt
- Publication date: 1999
- Publication place: Germany
- ISBN: 978-3-353-01168-8

Am kürzeren Ende der Sonnenallee (On the Shorter End of Sun Avenue) is the third novel by author Thomas Brussig. The novel is set in East Berlin in the real-life street of Sonnenallee sometime in the late 1970s or early 1980s. The film Sonnenallee, also written by Brussig, is based on the same characters but depicts a significantly different storyline. Unusual is the fact that the screenplay for Sonnenallee served as the basis for the novel, rather than the other way around.

The novel was first translated into English by Jonathan Franzen and Jenny Watson and published by Picador (imprint) in 2023 under the title 'The Short End of the Sonnenallee.'

== Themes of the Novel ==
The story is centered on the main character fifteen-year-old Michael "Micha" Kuppisch who lives with his parents and siblings, Sabine and Bernd, in a typical East Berlin flat. The story gives a nostalgic yet ironic outlook of living in the shorter end of Sonnenallee, a street which was divided during the creation of the German Democratic Republic, next to the Berlin Wall where the house numbering is comically told to start at number 379. Much of the story is based around Micha's love for the girl Miriam, another Sonnenallee resident, and the day-to-day lives of Micha and his friends.

Another prominent character is Uncle Heinz, Micha's uncle from West Berlin. The character shows how many living in West Berlin had a tainted, sympathetic and often condescending view on life on the other side of the wall. Uncle Heinz often smuggles small gifts for the Kuppisch family on his trips, despite the fact that everything he "smuggles" is, in fact, legal to bring into the GDR.

Throughout the story there is much focus on low-level rebellion by Micha and his friends, such as Wuschel's desire to listen to illegal music such as the Rolling Stones.
