= NVA (film) =

2005 film

- Directed by: Leander Haußmann
- Written by: Thomas Brussig; Leander Haußmann
- Produced by: Claus Boje; Detlev Buck
- Starring: Kim Frank; Oliver Bröcker; Detlev Buck; Jasmin Schwiers
- Cinematography: Frank Griebe
- Music by: Marcel Blatti; Paul Lemp
- Release date: 29 September 2005
- Running time: 98 min.
- Language: German

NVA (German: [ɛn faʊ̯ ˈʔaː]) is a German comedy film released in 2005, that involves two friends who serve in the National People's Army of the former GDR (East Germany). It was directed by Leander Haußmann, who – together with Thomas Brussig – also wrote the screenplay. The film caricatures the life of the National People's Army (abbreviated: NVA), in the final years of East Germany.

== Cast ==
- Kim Frank - Private Henrik Heidler
- Oliver Bröcker - Private Krüger
- Jasmin Schwiers - Marie Kalt
- Detlev Buck - Colonel Kalt
- Thorsten Michaelis - Captain Stummel
- Ignaz Kirchner - Warrant Officer Futterknecht
- Maxim Mehmet - Corporal Aurich
- Annika Kuhl - Nurse Sonja
- Robert Gwisdek - Traubewein

== Reception ==
The film received mostly negative reception. Reviewers with Die Tageszeitung stated that Haußmann shouldn't have turned the film into a light comedy, which the reviewer calling it "misleading" to not take on a serious tone and address the systematic abuse of conscripts. Another reviewr from Tagesspiegel stated that while the film was a comedy, the humour did not land and reiterated that the film also portrayed the NVA as too harmless.
