= Hilde (film) =

- Theatrical release poster
- Directed by: Kai Wessel
- Written by: Maria von Heland
- Based on: Der geschenkte Gaul by Hildegard Knef
- Produced by: Judy Tossell; Jens Meurer
- Starring: Heike Makatsch
- Cinematography: Hagen Bogdanski
- Edited by: Tina Freitag
- Music by: Martin Todsharow
- Production companies: Egoli Tossell Film; MMC Independent; Pictorion Pictures
- Distributed by: Warner Bros. Pictures
- Release date: 12 March 2009
- Running time: 137 minutes
- Country: Germany
- Language: German

Hilde is a 2009 German biographical film directed by Kai Wessel and starring Heike Makatsch, Dan Stevens and Monica Bleibtreu. It depicts the life of the German actress Hildegard Knef.

== Plot ==
In 1966 Hildegard Knef returns to Germany. While she prepares for a concert she thinks back to the beginnings of her career. Flashbacks show how she became an actress and then started a second career as a singer.

== Cast ==
- Heike Makatsch: Hildegard Knef
- Dan Stevens: David Cameron
- Monica Bleibtreu: Else Bongers
- Hanns Zischler: Erich Pommer
- Johanna Gastdorf: Frieda Knef
- Trystan Wyn Puetter: Kurt Hirsch
- Michael Gwisdek: grandfather
- Roger Cicero: Ricci Blum
- Anian Zollner: Ewald von Demandowsky
- Sylvester Groth: Boleslaw Barlog
- Fritz Roth: step-father
- Hary Prinz: Willi Forst
- Jeroen Willems: Anatole Litvak
- Stanley Townsend: David O. Selznick

== Reception ==
Kirk Honeycutt's wrote "Hilde" was an "outstanding biopic about Hildegard Knef with a captivating performance" by Heike Makatsch but also felt the screenplay was "at times superficial". Variety's Derek Elley attested Heike Makatsch a "remarkably cohesive performance" which was true to each "physical mannerism" of Hildegard Knef. "Easy on the eyes but rarely going more than skin-deep" was his roundup.
