= No More Mr. Nice Guy (film) =

1993 film

- Directed by: Detlev Buck
- Written by: Detlev Buck; Ernst Kahl
- Produced by: Claus Boje
- Starring: Joachim Król; Horst Krause
- Cinematography: Roger Heeremann
- Edited by: Peter R. Adam
- Release date: 1 April 1993
- Running time: 92 minutes
- Country: Germany
- Language: German

No More Mr. Nice Guy (German: Wir können auch anders …) is a 1993 German comedy film directed by Detlev Buck. It was entered into the 43rd Berlin International Film Festival where it won an Honourable Mention.

== Cast ==
- Joachim Król as Rudi Kipp a.k.a. 'Kipp'
- Horst Krause as Moritz Kipp a.k.a. 'Most'
- Konstantin Kotljarov as Viktor
- Sophie Rois as Nadine
- Heinrich Giskes as Kommissar (detective)
- Lutz Weidlich as Landvermesser (surveyor)
- Doris Bierett as Cafedame (Lady at the cafe)
- Christine Harbort as Cafedame (Lady at the cafe)
- Hans Martin Stier as Tankstellenverkaeufer (service man at gas station)
- Jan-Gregor Kremp as Wegelagerer (highwayman)
- Uwe Dag Berlin as Wegelagerer (highwayman)
- Rainer Gladosch as Wegelagerer (highwayman)
- Christian Schild as Wegelagerer (highwayman)
- Tom Uhrig as Wegelagerer (highwayman)
