= Charly Hübner =

German actor

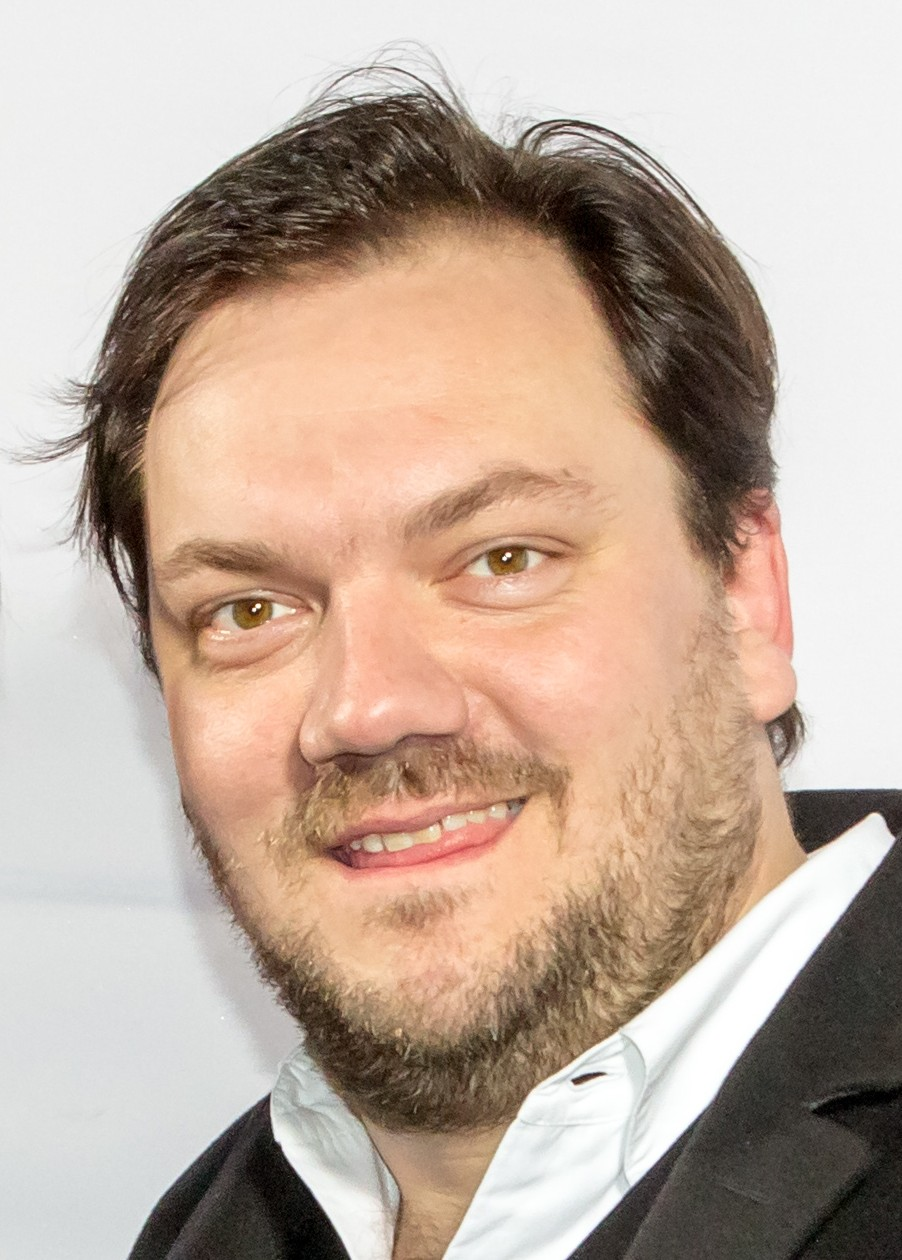
- Charly Hübner in 2015
- Born: Carsten Johannes Marcus Hübner; 4 December 1972 (age 53); Neustrelitz, East Germany
- Occupations: Actor, director
- Years active: 2003–present

Carsten Johannes Marcus Hübner (born 4 December 1972 in Neustrelitz) is a German actor. He appeared in more than eighty films since 2003, including Magical Mystery or: The Return of Karl Schmidt (in 2017) and The Good Neighbour (Unter Nachbarn, in 2011). Also known on TV for Transporter (between 2012 and 2014), Polizeiruf 110 (a detective series, between 2005 and 2019), crime series Post Mortem in 2007/2008.

== Life ==
The son of innkeepers Johannes and Margitta Hübner, his father was also a hotelier, city councilor and deputy mayor. Charly Hübner grew up in Feldberg (Neustrelitz district). He gained his first acting experiences in an amateur theater. After graduating from high school in 1991 from Carolinum Neustrelitz, he worked at the Landestheater Neustrelitz as an actor and assistant director.

In 1993, he began his studies at the Ernst Busch Academy of Dramatic Arts in Berlin. During his studies, he met the theater directors Tom Kühnel and Robert Schuster. Together, they created productions for the Maxim Gorki Theater and the Schaubühne in Berlin, and from 1997 also at the Schauspielhaus and the TAT in Frankfurt am Main. Between 1996 and 2002, Hübner worked among others with the directors Amélie Niermeyer, Peter Eschberg, Hans Hollmann and Christian Tschirner. In 2008, he continued after a long break his theatrical work at the Schauspielhaus Zurich. In 2011, he performed at the Schauspiel Köln, under the direction of Karin Beier, whom he followed in 2013 to the Deutsches Schauspielhaus in Hamburg.

In 2003, Hübner moved from the stage to the camera. In many movie supporting roles, he first appeared as a performer of the 'little people' or as a 'good friend'. In 2005 alone, he participated in 17 film projects. He gained additional prominence through a commercial for the Dresdner Bank. This gave his film career a boost, since in 2006 through his appearance in the Oscar winning feature film The Lives of Others, which won the 2006 Academy Award for Best Foreign Language Film. He played a night shift Stasi Hauptmann during the monitoring of a theatre playwright in 1984, during the cold war.

In 2007, Hübner received a starring role as a medical examiner 'Thomas Renner' in the RTL crime series Post Mortem, which had 2 series. Since 2008, he also appears in the Sat.1 comedy series Ladykracher, as the sketch partner of Anke Engelke, appearing from season 4 to season 8 in 2013. He received a comedy award in 2008. Hübner took on the title role in Rosa von Praunheim's improvisational film Der Rosa Riese (The Pink Giant, 2008) about the German serial killer Beate Schmidt. One of his most haunting experiences in front of the camera, the actor said in an interview.

He also starred in the television movie for the ZDF channel, Über den Tod hinaus (Beyond Death, in 2009).

Since 2010, Charly Hübner and Anneke Kim Sarnau make up the investigative duo Alexander Bukow and König in the Rostock based police drama Polizeiruf 110 on NDR channel. 2 episodes enemy picture and ... and out you are were both nominated for the Grimme-Preis (German TV Award) in 2012. The episode Fischer War brought Hübner in 2013 the Bavarian Television Award and much praise from critics.

He his next starring role was a sociopath in psychodrama film The Good Neighbour in 2011, for which he was awarded "Best German actor" of 2013, a Golden Camera Award.

In 2012, he started appearing in the internationally co-produced action series Transporter as a mechanic Dieter he appeared in 13 episodes. In 2013, Charly Hübner made his first small documentary as a director. For the ARD documentation 16 × Germany – Menschen – Orte – Geschichten, he delivered the part about Mecklenburg-Vorpommern. At the International Leipzig Festival for Documentary and Animated Film in 2017, he presented his documentary Wildes Herz about the band Feine Sahne Fischfilet, which was honored with four festival prizes.

== Personal life ==
Hübner is married to actress Lina Beckmann. She was voted actress of the year in 2011 by the magazine "Theater heute". They live in Hamburg.

== Selected filmography ==
Year	Title	Role	Notes
2004	Guys and Balls	Horst	
2004	Room Service	Robert	TV film
2006	The Lives of Others	Udo	
2007	Autopilots	Jörg	
2007	The Three Robbers		(German voice)
2007	Sweet Like Chocolate	Heinz Volkert	TV film
2008	Der Rosa Riese	Beate Schmidt	
2008	Hardcover	Klaus	
2008	At Any Second	Hübner	
2009	The Countess		
2009	Über den Tod hinaus	Harald Wagner	TV film
2011	The Good Neighbour	Robert Gratez	
2011	When Santa Fell to Earth	Angel Emmanuel	
2011	Burnt by the Sun 3: The Citadel	Gustav Lemke	
2013	Parents	Konrad	
2014	Open the Wall	Harald Schäfer	TV film
2015	Beware of People	Lorenz Brahmkamp	TV film
2016	Young Light	Walter Collien	
2016	Stefan Zweig: Farewell to Europe	Emil Ludwig	
2017	Magical Mystery or: The Return of Karl Schmidt	Karl Schmidt	
2018	3 Days in Quiberon		
2020	Lindenberg! Mach dein Ding		

2026: Spaziergang nach Syrakus. As the main character Paul Gompitz. Director: Lars Jessen.
