= Jailbirds (1996 film) =

1996 film

- Männerpension
- Directed by: Detlev Buck
- Screenplay by: Detlev Buck, Eckhard Theophil
- Produced by: Claus Boje
- Starring: Til Schweiger; Detlev Buck; Marie Bäumer; Heike Makatsch; Leander Haußmann
- Cinematography: Sławomir Idziak
- Edited by: Peter R. Adam
- Music by: Detlef Petersen
- Production company: Boje Buck Produktion GmbH
- Distributed by: Central Film
- Release date: February 1, 1996
- Running time: 96 minutes
- Country: Germany
- Language: German
- Box office: 34 million Deutsch Mark (Germany)

Jailbirds (German: Männerpension) is a 1996 German comedy film directed by Detlev Buck.

== Plot ==
Prison warden Dr. Fazetti believes to have developed an effective new concept for the rehabilitation of prisoners by offering them the chance to take a break from their sentence if only they can find a trustworthy woman who takes care of them and vouches for them. The convicts Steinbock and Hammer-Gerd succeed in doing so. However, since they are tough guys stamped by prison fights they have their issues when it comes to discipline and it is particularly hard for them to have a lady as boss. However, Steinbock falls in love with Emilia and Hammer-Gerd promotes Maren's career as a singer. Eventually they have to go back behind bars but Emilia and Maren are now waiting for them.

== Reception ==
The film was awarded a Bambi and a Jupiter as best German film of the year. Heike Makatsch, a TV presenter in her first role, was given a Bavarian Film Award as best actress. The film also received a Goldene Leinwand (Golden Screen) for its results at the German box office, where it had 3.3 million admissions generating a gross of 34 million Deutsch Mark and was the second most popular German film of the year behind Werner - Das Muss Kesseln!, the sequel to Werner – Beinhart!.
