= The Sun of the Sleepless =

1992 film

- DVD cover
- Directed by: Temur Babluani
- Written by: Temur Babluani
- Starring: Givi Sikharulidze
- Release date: 1992
- Running time: 123 minutes
- Country: Georgia
- Language: Georgian

The Sun of the Sleepless (Georgian: უძინართა მზე Udzinarta mze, "Sleeping sun") is a 1992 Georgian drama film directed by Temur Babluani. It was entered into the 43rd Berlin International Film Festival where it won the Silver Bear for outstanding artistic contribution.

The film had been directed since 1985 until 1992. The film was translated into several languages through dubbing as well as subtitling. Catchphrases and a soundtrack (more precisely melody which is a leitmotif of this film) of the film are very widespread among Georgian people. Occasionally vulgar words occur in the film. The director has dedicated the work to his father, who is also a doctor.

== Plot ==
The film is about a doctor named Gela Bendeliani (Elgudzha Burduli) and his wealthless family in Tbilisi in Soviet Georgia. In the film Gela Bendeliani has an unlimited capacity for generosity and forgiveness. He has been working in a government institution, privately experimenting on white mice for 23 years to find a cure for cancer. The authorities disapprove of his work and he has already been thrown out of his job many times.

Dato, his son, has been in constant trouble with the law. He apparently loves his father but it is clear that neither father nor son understand each other. Dato is involved in vaguely criminal dealings although he and his criminal friends spend their hours together in an automobile workshop. The rest of the film is about Dato's doings with and without his father, Dato's success at crime and Gela Bendeliani's tragic failure in science. In the end, Dato is the only one that believes in his father.

== Cast ==
- Elgudzha Burduli as Gela Bendeliani
- David Kazishvili as Dato Bendeliani
- Lia Babluani
- Eka Saatashvili
- Givi Sikharulidze
- Leo Pilpani
- Flora Shadaniya
- Lika Kavjaradze
- Soso Jachvliani
- Murtaz Zhvaniya
