= Confessions of Felix Krull (2021 film) =

- Theatrical release poster
- Directed by: Detlev Buck
- Screenplay by: Daniel Kehlmann
- Based on: Confessions of Felix Krull by Thomas Mann
- Produced by: Markus Zimmer
- Starring: Jannis Niewöhner; Liv Lisa Fries; David Kross; Joachim Król; Maria Furtwängler; Nicholas Ofczarek; Annette Frier
- Cinematography: Marc Achenbach
- Edited by: Peter R. Adam
- Music by: Helmut Zerlett
- Production company: Bavaria Filmproduktion
- Distributed by: Warner Bros. Pictures
- Release date: 2 September 2021
- Running time: 114 minutes
- Country: Germany
- Language: German
- Box office: $192,139

Confessions of Felix Krull (German: Bekenntnisse des Hochstaplers Felix Krull) is a 2021 German film directed by Detlev Buck and written by Daniel Kehlmann. It is an adaptation of 1954 unfinished novel Confessions of Felix Krull by Thomas Mann.

The film was released in Germany on 2 September 2021 by Warner Bros. Pictures.

== Cast ==
- Jannis Niewöhner as Felix Krull
- Liv Lisa Fries as Zaza
- David Kross as Marquis Louis de Venosta
- Maria Furtwängler as Madame Houpflé
- Joachim Król as Professor Kuckuck
- Désirée Nosbusch as Madame Kuckuck
- Christian Friedel as König von Portugal
- Nicholas Ofczarek as Stanko
- Annette Frier as Felix Krulls Mutter
