= Thomas Brussig =

German writer

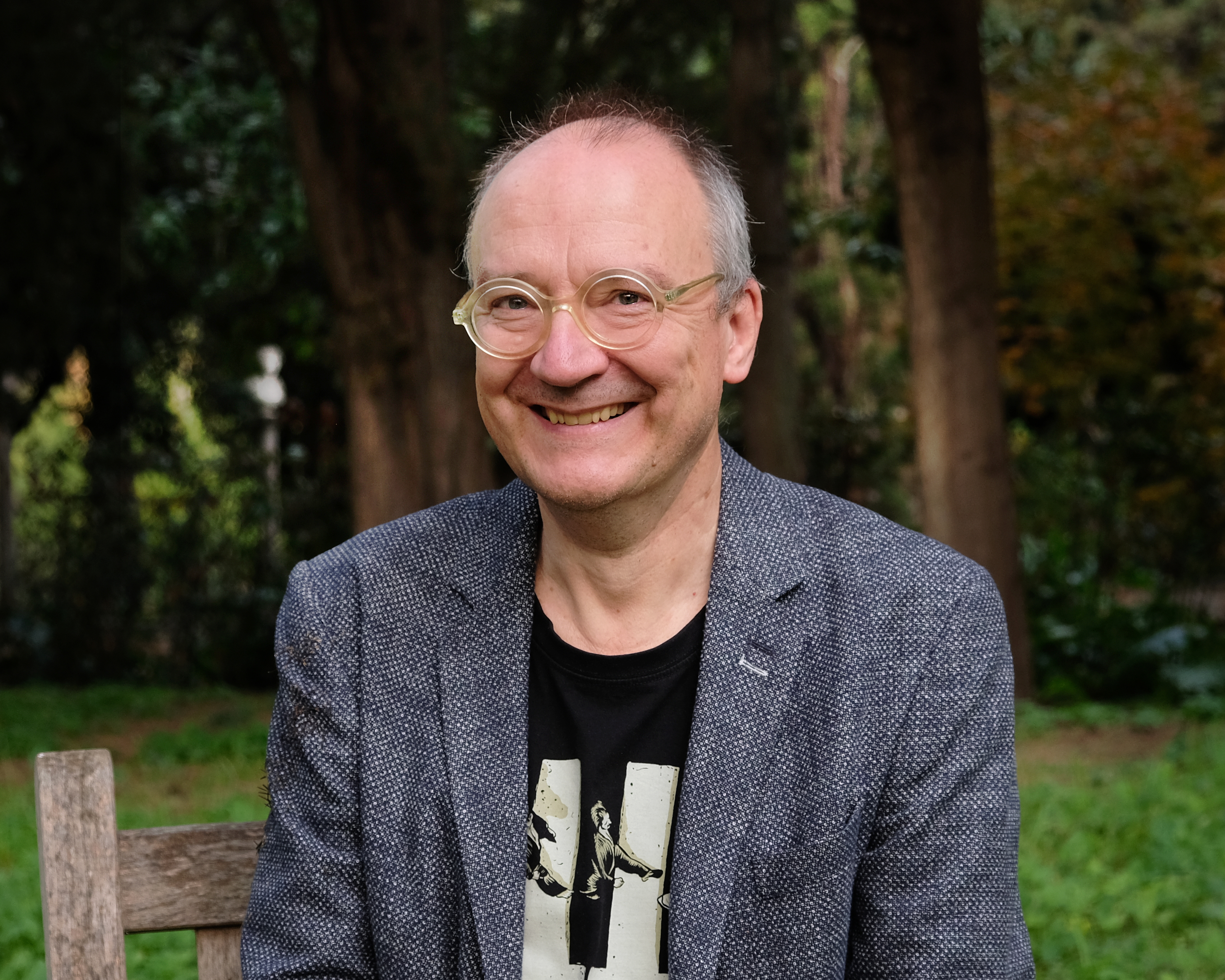
Brussig in 2024

Thomas Brussig (born 1964) is a German writer best known for his satirical novels that deal with the German Democratic Republic.

== Life ==
Brussig was born in East Berlin. After attending the "Heinrich-Hertz" School, he went on to train as a builder. In 1984, he finished school and training, and served in the East German National People's Army (German: Nationale Volksarmee or NVA). Brussig found it difficult to wield a weapon and had a hard time. He worked as a museum guard, cleaner and hotel porter among a variety of other odd jobs until the early 90s. In 1990, he studied sociology at the Free University of Berlin. He changed universities 3 years later to study the art of film-making. He graduated in the year 2000.

Thomas Brussig commutes back and forth from Berlin to Mecklenburg as a writer and is married.

== Works ==
Brussig's first novel, Wasserfarben ("Watercolors") was published in 1991 under the pseudonym "Cordt Berneburger." In 1995, he published his breakthrough novel, Helden wie wir (Heroes Like Us, FSG 1997), which dealt with the fall of the Berlin Wall. The book was a critical and commercial success and was later turned into a movie. Two movies of his books have been released, "Helden wie wir" and "Sonnenallee".

== Bibliography ==
- Brussig, Thomas (2016). Wasserfarben Roman (in German). Berlin: Aufbau Taschenbuch Verlag. ISBN 978-3-7466-3205-6. OCLC 929992845.
- Brussig, Thomas (2015). Helden wie wir Roman (in German). Fischer. ISBN 978-3-10-403760-8. OCLC 993037044.
  - * Brussig, Thomas; Brownjohn, John (1997). Heroes like us. New York. ISBN 0-374-52760-1. OCLC 900730944.
- Brussig, Thomas (2001). Am kürzeren Ende der Sonnenallee (in German). Frankfurt am Main. ISBN 3-596-14847-2. OCLC 48094410.
- Brussig, Thomas (2005). Leben bis Männer (in German). Frankfurt am Main: Fischer Taschenbuch Verlag. ISBN 3-596-16962-3. OCLC 237770616.
- Brussig, Thomas (2004). Wie es leuchtet. Roman (in German). Frankfurt am Main: S. Fischer. ISBN 3-10-009580-4. OCLC 56583257.
- Brussig, Thomas (2007). Berliner Orgie. München: Piper. ISBN 978-3-492-05037-1. OCLC 86075439.
- Brussig, Thomas (2007). Schiedsrichter Fertig: Eine Litanei (in German). St. Pölten: Residenz. ISBN 978-3-7017-1481-0. OCLC 173602240.

== Filmography ==
- 1999: Sonnenallee – Dir. Leander Haußmann (with Detlev Buck, Robert Stadlober, Alexander Beyer)
- 1999: Heroes Like Us – Dir. Sebastian Peterson

== Awards ==
- 2000 Hans Fallada Prize
