= 43rd Berlin International Film Festival =

1993 film festival in Berlin, Germany

- Festival poster
- Location: Berlin, Germany
- Founded: 1951
- Awards: Golden Bear: The Wedding Banquet; Woman Sesame Oil Maker
- No. of films: 232 films
- Festival date: 11–22 February 1993
- Website: Website

Berlin International Film Festival chronology
- 44th 42nd

The 43rd annual Berlin International Film Festival was held from 11 to 22 February 1993.

The Golden Bear was jointly awarded to American-Taiwanese film The Wedding Banquet directed by Ang Lee and Chinese film Woman Sesame Oil Maker directed by Xie Fei.

The retrospective dedicated to CinemaScope was shown at the festival.

== Juries ==
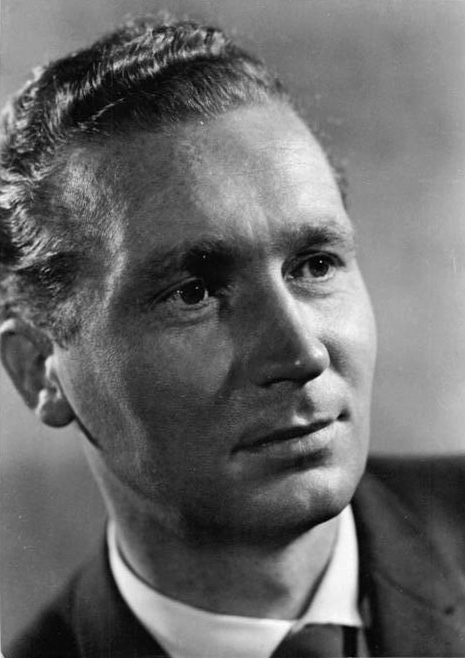
Frank Beyer, Jury President

The following people were announced as being on the jury for the festival:

=== Main Competition ===
- Frank Beyer, German filmmaker - Jury President
- Juan Antonio Bardem, Spanish filmmaker
- Michel Boujut, French writer, producer and film critic
- François Duplat, French producer
- Katinka Faragó, Swedish producer
- Krystyna Janda, Polish actress
- Naum Kleiman, Russian historian and film critic
- Brock Peters, American actor
- Susan Strasberg, American actress
- Johanna ter Steege, Dutch actress
- Zhang Yimou, Chinese filmmaker

== Official Selection ==
=== Main Competition ===
The following films were in competition for the Golden Bear and Silver Bear awards:

English title	Original title	Director(s)	Country
Arizona Dream		Emir Kusturica	United States, France
Belle Époque		Fernando Trueba	Spain, Portugal, France
The Betrayed	Op afbetaling	Frans Weisz	Netherlands
The Cement Garden		Andrew Birkin	France, Germany, United Kingdom
The Conjugal Bed	Patul conjugal	Mircea Daneliuc	Romania
Diary of a Maniac	Diario di un vizio	Marco Ferreri	Italy
Hoffa		Danny DeVito	United States
Le Jeune Werther		Jacques Doillon	France
Just a Matter of Duty	Die Denunziantin	Thomas Mitscherlich	Germany
Life According to Agfa	החיים על פי אגפא	Assi Dayan	Israel
The Little Apocalypse	La Petite Apocalypse	Costa-Gavras	France, Italy, Poland
Love Field		Jonathan Kaplan	United States
Malcolm X		Spike Lee	United States
No More Mr. Nice Guy	Wir können auch anders ...	Detlev Buck	Germany
Pain of Love	Kærlighedens smerte	Nils Malmros	Denmark
The Russian Singer	Den russiske sangerinde	Morten Arnfred	Denmark
Samba Traoré		Idrissa Ouedraogo	Burkina Faso, Germany, Ghana, United Kingdom
Sankofa	ሳንኮፋ	Haile Gerima	Burkina Faso, France, Switzerland, United Kingdom
The Sun of the Sleepless	უძინართა მზე	Temur Babluani	Georgia
The Telegraphist	Telegrafisten	Erik Gustavson	Norway, Denmark
Toys		Barry Levinson	United States
The Wedding Banquet	喜宴	Ang Lee	United States, Taiwan
Whoops	Hoppá	Gyula Maár	Hungary
Woman Sesame Oil Maker	香魂女	Xie Fei	China
Yearning	Yume no onna	Bandō Tamasaburō V	Japan

== Official Awards ==
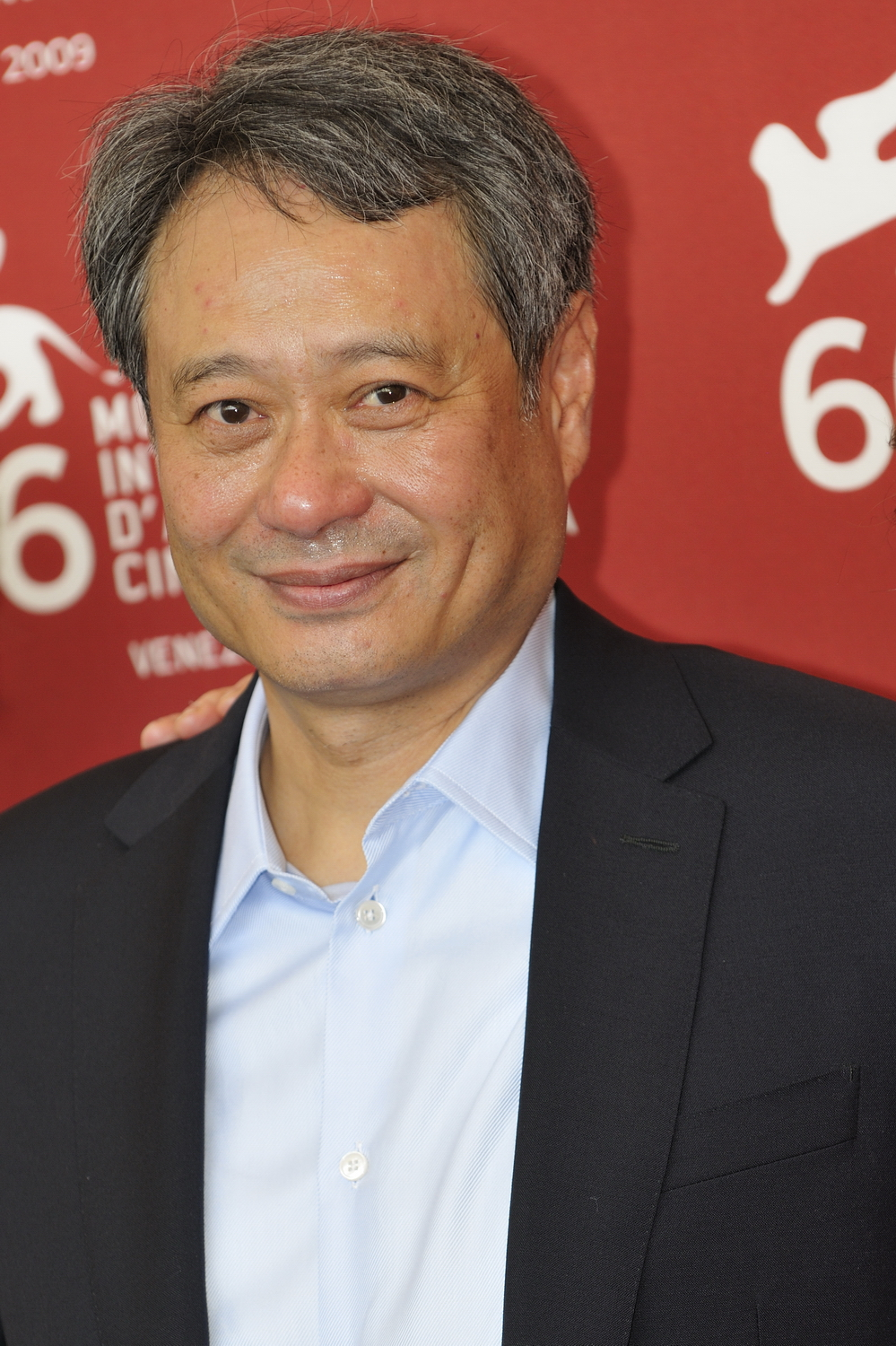
Ang Lee, co-winner of the Golden Bear at the festival

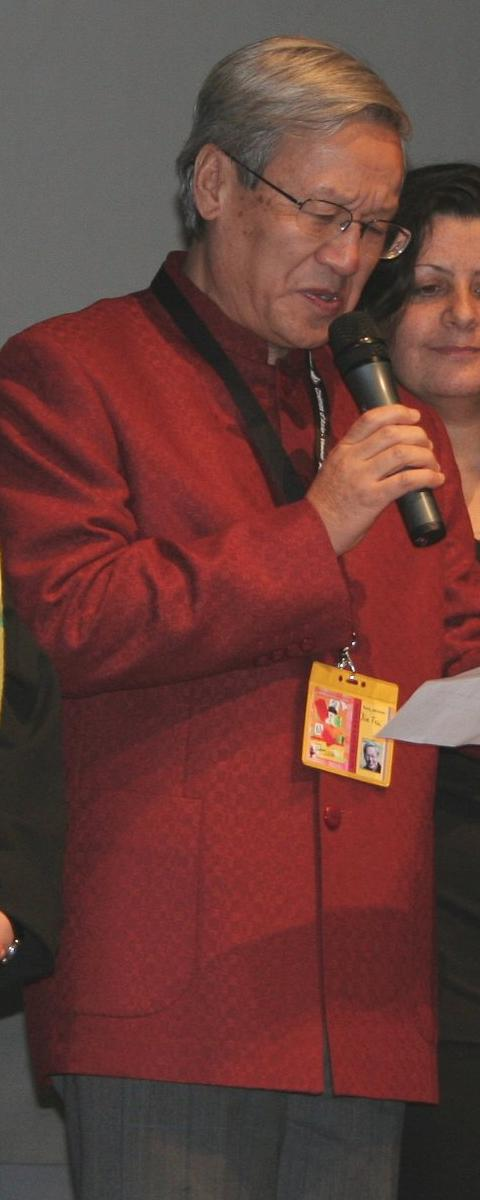
Xie Fei, co-winner of the Golden Bear at the festival

The following prizes were awarded by the Jury:

- Golden Bear:
  - The Wedding Banquet by Ang Lee
  - Woman Sesame Oil Maker by Xie Fei
- Silver Bear – Special Jury Prize: Arizona Dream by Emir Kusturica
- Silver Bear for Best Director: Andrew Birkin for The Cement Garden
- Silver Bear for Best Actress: Michelle Pfeiffer for Love Field
- Silver Bear for Best Actor: Denzel Washington for Malcolm X
- Silver Bear for an outstanding artistic contribution: Udzinarta mze by Temur Babluani
- Silver Bear: Samba Traoré by Idrissa Ouedraogo
- Honourable Mention:
  - Life According to Agfa by Assi Dayan
  - No More Mr. Nice Guy by Detlev Buck

=== Blue Angel Award ===
- Le Jeune Werther by Jacques Doillon

=== Honorary Golden Bear ===
- Billy Wilder
- Gregory Peck

=== Berlinale Camera ===
- Victoria Abril
- Juliette Binoche
- Gong Li
- Corinna Harfouch
- Johanna ter Steege
