= Obsession (1997 film) =

Obsession – Besessene Seelen
- Directed by: Peter Sehr
- Written by: Marie Noelle; Peter Sehr
- Produced by: Wolfgang Esterer; George Hoffmann; Dagmar Rosenbauer
- Starring: Daniel Craig; Heike Makatsch; Charles Berling
- Cinematography: David Watkin
- Edited by: Heidi Handorf
- Music by: Micki Meuser
- Release dates: 28 August 1997 (Germany); 9 September 1997 (Toronto Film Festival)
- Running time: 100 minutes
- Countries: France; Germany
- Languages: French; English; German
- Budget: $4.6 million
- Box office: $15.000

Obsession is a 1997 Franco-German drama film directed by Peter Sehr from a screenplay he co-wrote with Marie Noelle. It stars Daniel Craig, Heike Makatsch, Charles Berling and Seymour Cassel.

The film was released in Germany on the 28th August, 1997 and premiered at the 22nd Toronto International Film Festival on the 9th September, 1997.

== Plot ==
The film follows two men, Pierre and John, who find themselves ensnared in a romantic entanglement with the same woman, Miriam. Pierre, Miriam’s steadfast companion, has been by her side for years. Meanwhile, John, a stranger to Miriam until a chance encounter at a bustling Berlin train station, becomes the third vertex of the love triangle. As the story progresses, it becomes evident that both men harbor profound affection for Miriam, and she reciprocates their feelings with equal intensity. The film explores the complexities and nuances of this romantic predicament.

== Cast ==
- Daniel Craig as John MacHale
- Marie-Christine Barrault as Ella Beckmann
- Charles Berling as Pierre
- Heike Makatsch as Miriam Auerbach
- Seymour Cassel as Jacob Frischmuth
- Allen Garfield as Simon Frischmuth
- Daniel Gélin as Xavier
- Mark Strong as Craig's German voice dub

== Awards and nominations ==
- 1997 – San Sebastián International Film Festival – Recipient: Peter Sehr
- 1998 – German Film Awards – Categories: Outstanding Feature Film and Outstanding Individual Achievement – Actress Heike Makatsch
