= Post Mortem (TV series) =

- Genre: Crime drama
- Created by: Lorenz Lau-Uhle
- Starring: Hannes Jaenicke; Anne Cathrin Buhtz; Charly Hübner; Mirko Lang; Therese Hämer; Tilo Nest
- Country of origin: Germany
- Original language: German
- No. of seasons: 2
- No. of episodes: 17 (list of episodes)

Production
- Production locations: Cologne, Germany
- Running time: 45'

Original release
- Network: RTL
- Release: 18 January 2007 – 3 March 2008

Post Mortem is a German crime drama television series which premiered on 18 January 2007 on RTL with a nine-Episode first Season. In April 2007 the series was renewed for a second season with another eight episodes, which will begin airing on 17 January 2008.
