= Horst Krause =

German actor (1941–2025)

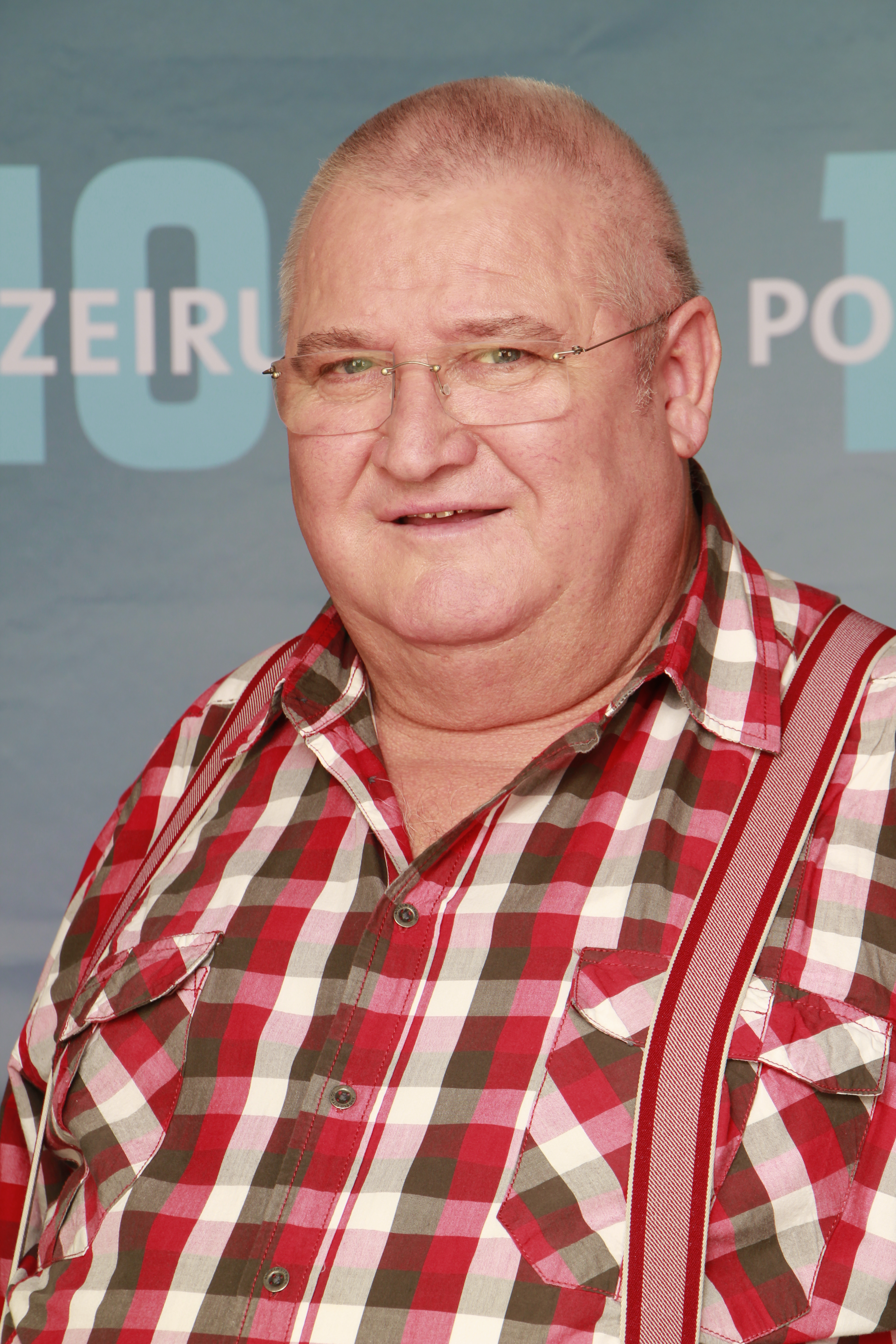
- Krause in 2012
- Born: 18 December 1941; Bönhof, Reichsgau Danzig-West Prussia, Germany
- Died: 5 September 2025 (aged 83); Teltow, Brandenburg, Germany
- Occupation: Actor
- Years active: 1964–2025

Horst Krause (18 December 1941 – 5 September 2025) was a German actor.

== Life and career ==
Krause was born in Bönhof, Reichsgau Danzig-West Prussia (now Benowo, Poland) on 18 December 1941, the youngest of five children. Along with his family he was expelled to Ludwigsfelde in 1947. Krause worked as a machinist at the Brandenburger Traktorenwerke and started his acting career at the age of 23. From 1964 to 1967 he attended the Ernst Busch Academy of Dramatic Arts.

From 1969 onward, Krause worked as a stage actor at the Schauspielhaus Karl-Marx-Stadt (Chemnitz) and from 1984 to 1994 at the Staatsschauspiel Dresden. Following the reunification of Germany, Krause won the Deutscher Filmpreis for his role in the 1993 film No More Mr. Nice Guy.

In the 1990s, Krause became a popular TV character in the Polizeiruf 110 crime series. In Polizeiruf 110, he first appeared in various guest roles, then from 1999 to 2015, in a regular role as the sympathetic, down-to-earth police sergeant Horst Krause (the character was named like him) in Polizeiruf 110. The policeman Krause character was so popular that a nine-part TV film series about him was made between 2007 and 2022, focusing not on the police work, but rather on his private life and family (Polizeihauptmeister Krause).

Krause was also the lead actor in the 2003 film Schultze Gets the Blues, which was played in a number of countries, including the United States, where Roger Ebert lauded the film.

Krause died on 5 September 2025, at the age of 83.

== Awards ==
- Deutscher Filmpreis 1993, No More Mr. Nice Guy (with Joachim Król)
- Stockholm International Film Festival 2003, best actor (Schultze Gets the Blues)

== Filmography ==
- No More Mr. Nice Guy (Wir können auch anders …) (1993)
- Club Las Piranjas (1995, TV film)
- Dicke Freunde (1995, TV film)
- A Girl Called Rosemary (1996, TV film)
- Liane (1996, TV film)
- Charley's Aunt (1996, TV film)
- Night Time (1998)
- Schweigen ist Gold (2000, TV film)
- Schultze Gets the Blues (2003)
- Krügers Odyssee (2017)
- Küss die Hand, Krüger (2018)
- Krauses Hoffnung (2019)
