= Temur Babluani =

Georgian film director, script writer and actor

Temur Babluani (Georgian: თემურ ბაბლუანი; born 20 March 1948) is a Georgian film director, script writer, and actor.

== Biography ==
Bebluani was born in the mountainous Svanetian village of Chaguri in the Georgian SSR. He graduated from Tbilisi State Theater Institute in 1979, being tutored by Tengiz Abuladze and Irakli Kvirikadze. He performed in the Soviet-era movies Our Youth (ღიმილის ბიჭები, 1969), Earth, This Is Your Son (მშობლიურო ჩემო მიწავ, 1980), and Cucaracha (კუკარაჩა, 1982); and directed The Flight of Sparrows (ბეღურების გადაფრენა, 1980), and The Brother (ძმა, 1981). His The Sun of the Sleepless (უძინართა მზე, 1992), for which he was also a composer, became a cult film in Georgia and won grand prizes at the festivals in Tbilisi (Georgia) and Sochi (Georgia) as well as a Silver Bear for an outstanding artistic contribution at the 43rd Berlin International Film Festival. In 1996, he was one of the producers of A Chef in Love directed by Nana Jorjadze, which became the first Georgian film to be nominated for the Academy Award.

His elder son, Géla Babluani, is also a filmmaker; the younger, Giorgi, is an actor.
