= Magical Mystery or: The Return of Karl Schmidt =

2017 film

- Directed by: Arne Feldhusen
- Starring: Charly Hübner
- Release date: 31 August 2017
- Running time: 111 minutes
- Country: Germany
- Language: German

Magical Mystery or: The Return of Karl Schmidt (German: Magical Mystery oder: Die Rückkehr des Karl Schmidt) is a 2017 German comedy-drama film based on a novel by Sven Regener.

== Plot ==
After recovering from a phase of drug induced mental illness Karl Schmidt (Charly Hübner) meets his old friends from the music business. Ferdi (Detlev Buck) convinces him to be the driver for the techno DJ team on a tour through Germany.

== Cast ==
- Charly Hübner - Karl Schmidt
- Annika Meier - Rosa
- Detlev Buck - Ferdi
- Marc Hosemann - Raimund Schulte
- Bastian Reiber - Basti
- Jacob Matschenz - Holger
- Sarah Viktoria Frick - Sigi
- Bjarne Mädel - Werner
