= Benowo =

- Village
- Location within Poland
- Coordinates: 53°53′39″N 18°55′39″E
- Country: Poland
- Voivodeship: Pomeranian
- County: Kwidzyn
- Gmina: Ryjewo
- Population: 308

Benowo ([bɛˈnɔvɔ]) (German: Bönhof or Bönhoff) is a village in the administrative district of Gmina Ryjewo, within Kwidzyn County, Pomeranian Voivodeship, in northern Poland.

For the history of the region, see History of Pomerania.

== Notable residents ==
- Horst Krause (1941–2025), German actor
