= Sonnenallee (Berlin) =

Thoroughfare in Berlin, Germany

Coordinates: 52°28′29.78″N 13°27′12.96″E

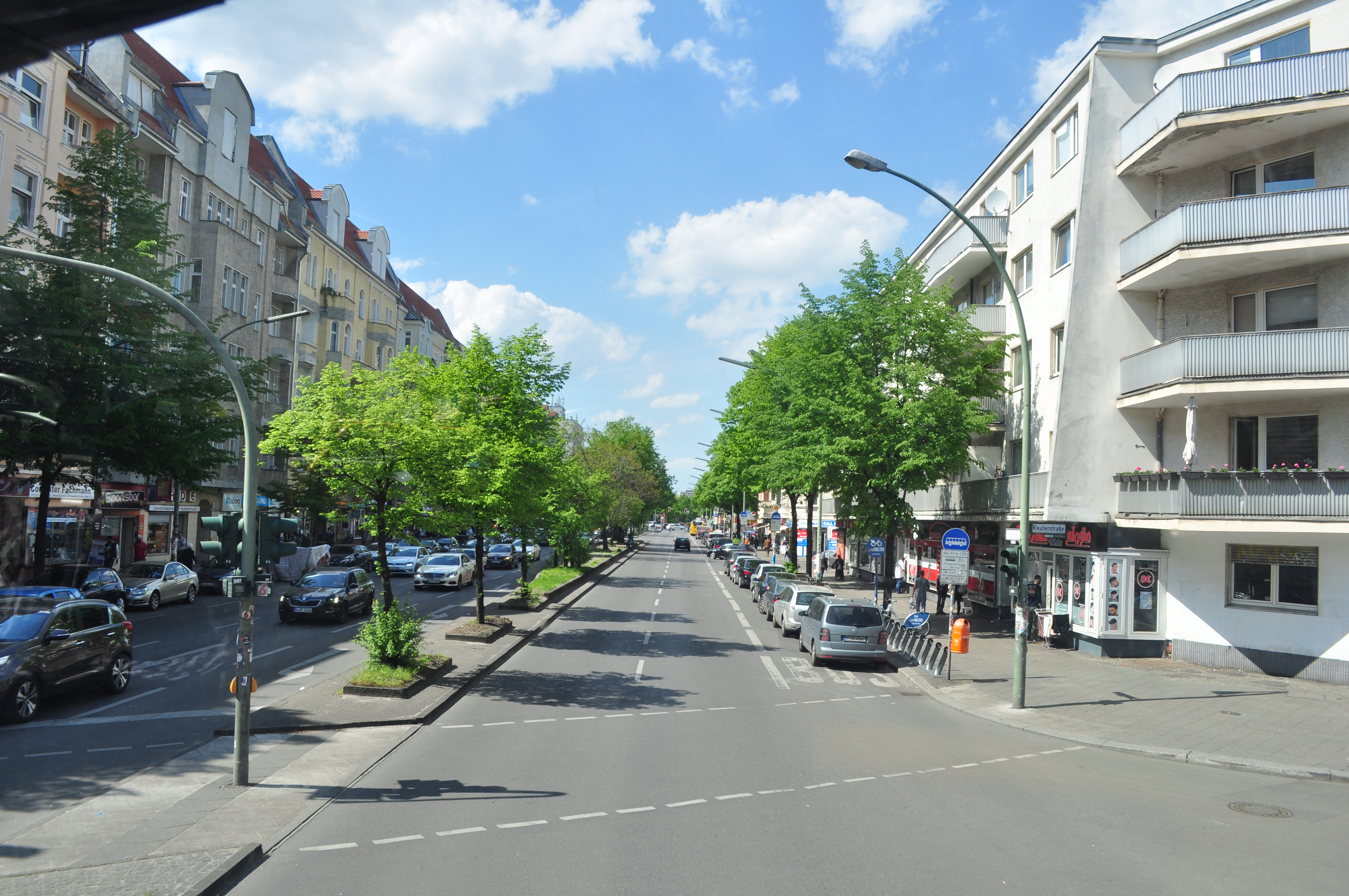
Sonnenallee, Berlin-Neukölln, Germany.

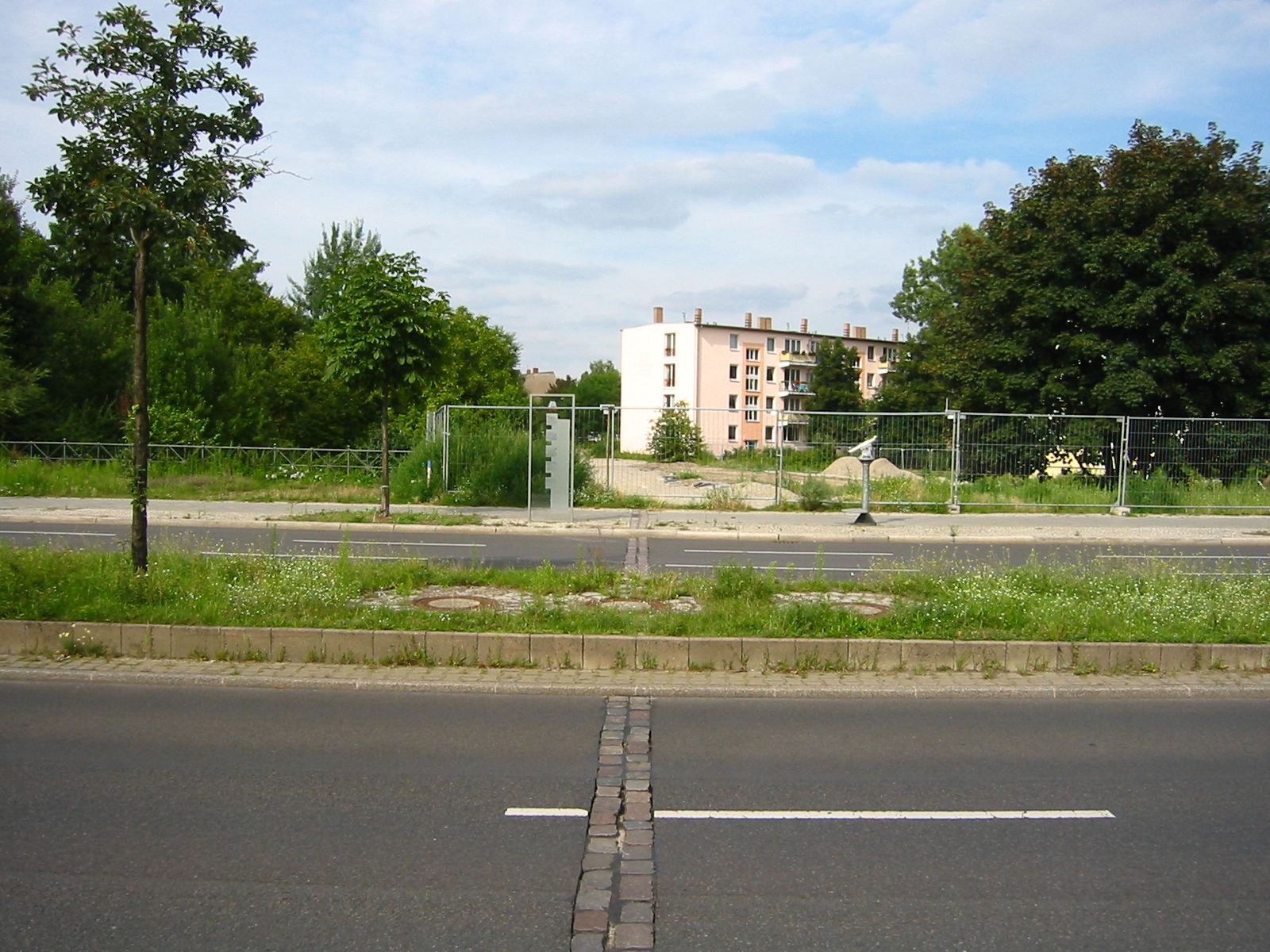
Paving stones symbolise the former border between West and East Berlins.

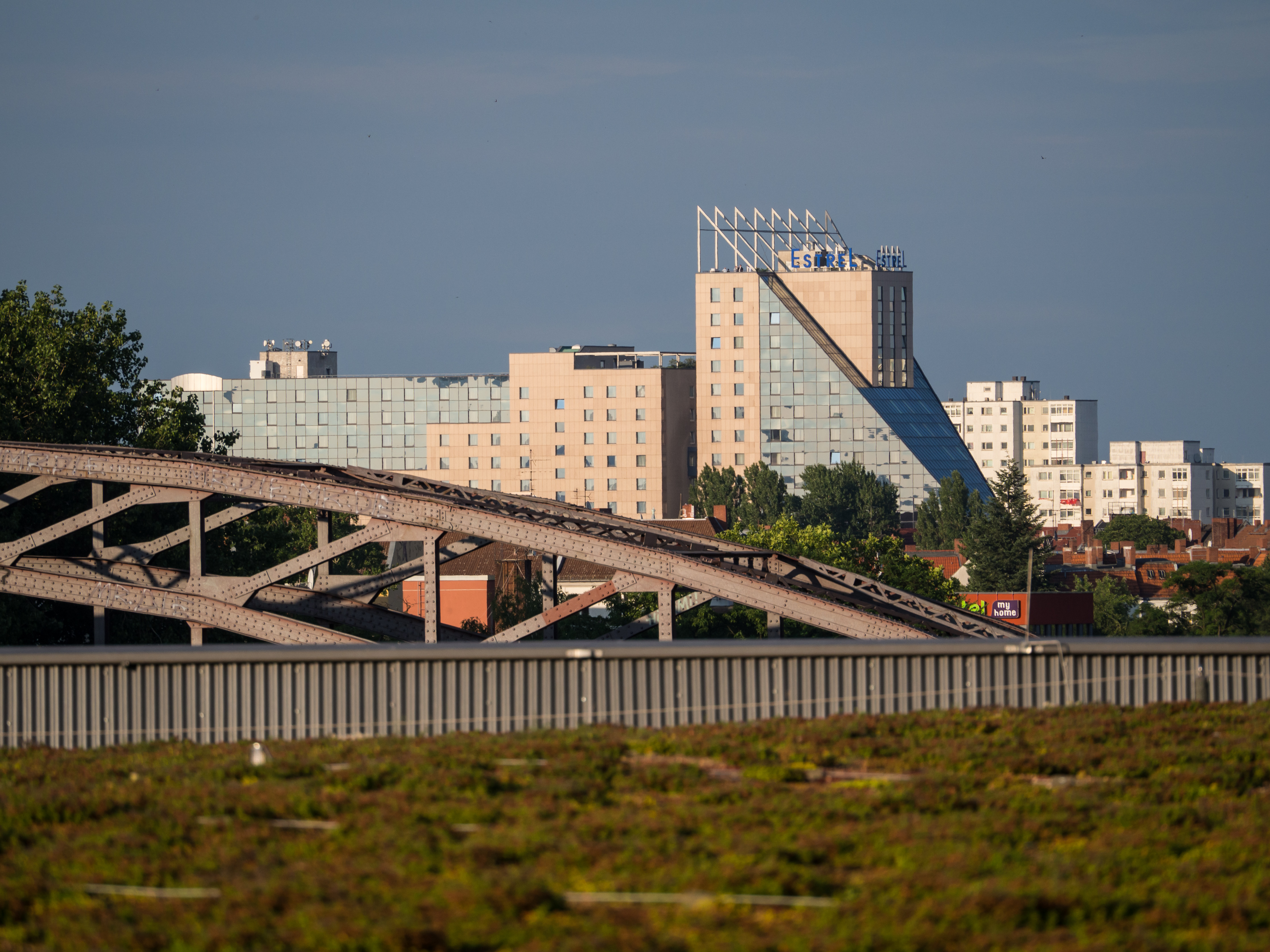
Estrel Hotel at Sonnenallee.

The Sonnenallee (“Sun Avenue”) is a street in Berlin, Germany, connecting the districts of Neukölln and Treptow-Köpenick. The street is 5 km long, crossing Baumschulenstraße at its south-east end and terminating at Hermannplatz, in the north-west. Sonnenallee was constructed at the end of the 19th century. The area around the Sonnenallee was created to cater for the rural drift to the city of that period.

== Description ==
Sonnenallee is nearly 5 kilometres long, with around 4.5 kilometres in the district of Neukölln, and 400 meters in Treptow-Köpenick. It begins in the north-west, at Hermannplatz, as the continuation of Urbanstraße, runs 2,600 meters south-east, before crossing the Ringbahn and, shortly thereafter, the Neukölln Ship Canal. After the intersection with Grenzallee and Dammweg, Sonnenallee passes several allotments (Kleingartenanlagen) and two large housing estates, leading to its south-easterly endpoint at Baumschulenstraße.

Several city squares lie along Sonnenallee, such as Hermannplatz, Hertzbergplatz and Venusplatz. The entire length of the street originally had trees running down both sides and a verge down the middle, which until 1965 housed a tram line. In the 1980s, this central strip was removed in places to make way for further lanes or parking spaces. Today it has six lanes and is an important arterial route in Berlin's south-east.

== History ==
During its history, the Sonnenallee has been known under various other names. At the beginning the street was known simply as Straße 84 (Street No. 84). In 1893, five years after the death of Kaiser Friedrich Wilhelm the street was renamed in his honour. In the 1920s, the street was extended to the south-east and named Sonnenallee.

During the communist period, the street was intersected by the Berlin Wall including a border crossing.

Nowadays, Sonnenallee is home to a large immigrant population of Middle Eastern origin, particularly of Syrian, earning it the nickname of "Arab Street". The area has also gained a reputation for crime, an image which is possibly promoted by crime TV series such as 4 Blocks.

== Cultural references ==
The 1999 film of the same name and its corresponding book portrayed a nostalgic view of the GDR in the 1970s, which earned it national notoriety in Germany.
