= Schultze Gets the Blues =

- German theatrical release poster
- Directed by: Michael Schorr
- Written by: Michael Schorr
- Produced by: Jens Körner
- Starring: Horst Krause; Harald Warmbrunn; Karl-Fred Müller; Wilhelmine Horschig; Rosemarie Deibel; Anne V. Angelle
- Distributed by: United International Pictures
- Release date: 2 September 2003
- Running time: 114 minutes
- Country: Germany
- Language: German

Schultze Gets the Blues is a 2003 German comedy-drama film, the first directed and written by Michael Schorr.

== Plot ==
Schultze (played by Horst Krause) is a large, recently retired salt-miner living in Teutschenthal (near Halle, Saxony-Anhalt in Germany). Along with his also laid-off friends Jürgen and Manfred, he finds himself restless with so much spare time.

For years, he has played traditional polka music on his accordion, but a series of upheavals in his life inspires an interest in American Zydeco and Cajun music. Despite his initial fear of travelling to the United States, he accepts his music club's wish to represent it at a German folk music festival in New Braunfels, Texas.

However, instead of appearing there, he chooses to travel in a motor boat around the countryside despite speaking little English, immersing himself in the music and culture of the Bayou. Finally, among his newly-found friends, he becomes very sick and presumably dies. Back in Teutschenthal, a funeral is held for Schultze, which turns into a decent and mildly happy celebration of his life: "Herr, lehre uns bedenken, dass wir alle einmal sterben müssen, auf das wir im Leben klug werden" – "Lord, teach us to understand we all have to die sometime, that we become wiser in our lives" (Psalms 90:12).

== Cast ==
- Horst Krause as Schultze
- Harald Warmbrunn as Jürgen
- Karl-Fred Müller as Manfred
- Wilhelmine Horschig as Lisa
- Rosemarie Deibel as Mrs Lorant
- Anne V. Angelle as Aretha

== Awards ==
The 2003 Stockholm International Film Festival awarded Best Picture to "Schultze Gets the Blues", and Best Actor to Horst Krause.

The 2004 German Film Awards nominated Horst Krause for Best Performance by an Actor in a Leading Role. Natascha Tagwerk, the film's production designer and art director, was nominated for Best Production Design, and won the award.

Roger Ebert rated the movie with 3.5 out of 4 stars and awarded it with his "Special Jury Award" when listing his Best Movies of 2005.
