= Rainer Makatsch =

German ice hockey player

Personal information
- Nationality: German
- Born: 1 July 1946 (age 78); Leipzig, Germany

Sport
- Sport: Ice hockey

Rainer Makatsch (born 1 July 1946) is a German ice hockey player. He competed in the men's tournament at the 1972 Winter Olympics.

He is the father of actress Heike Makatsch.
