= Heike Makatsch =

German actress (born 1971)

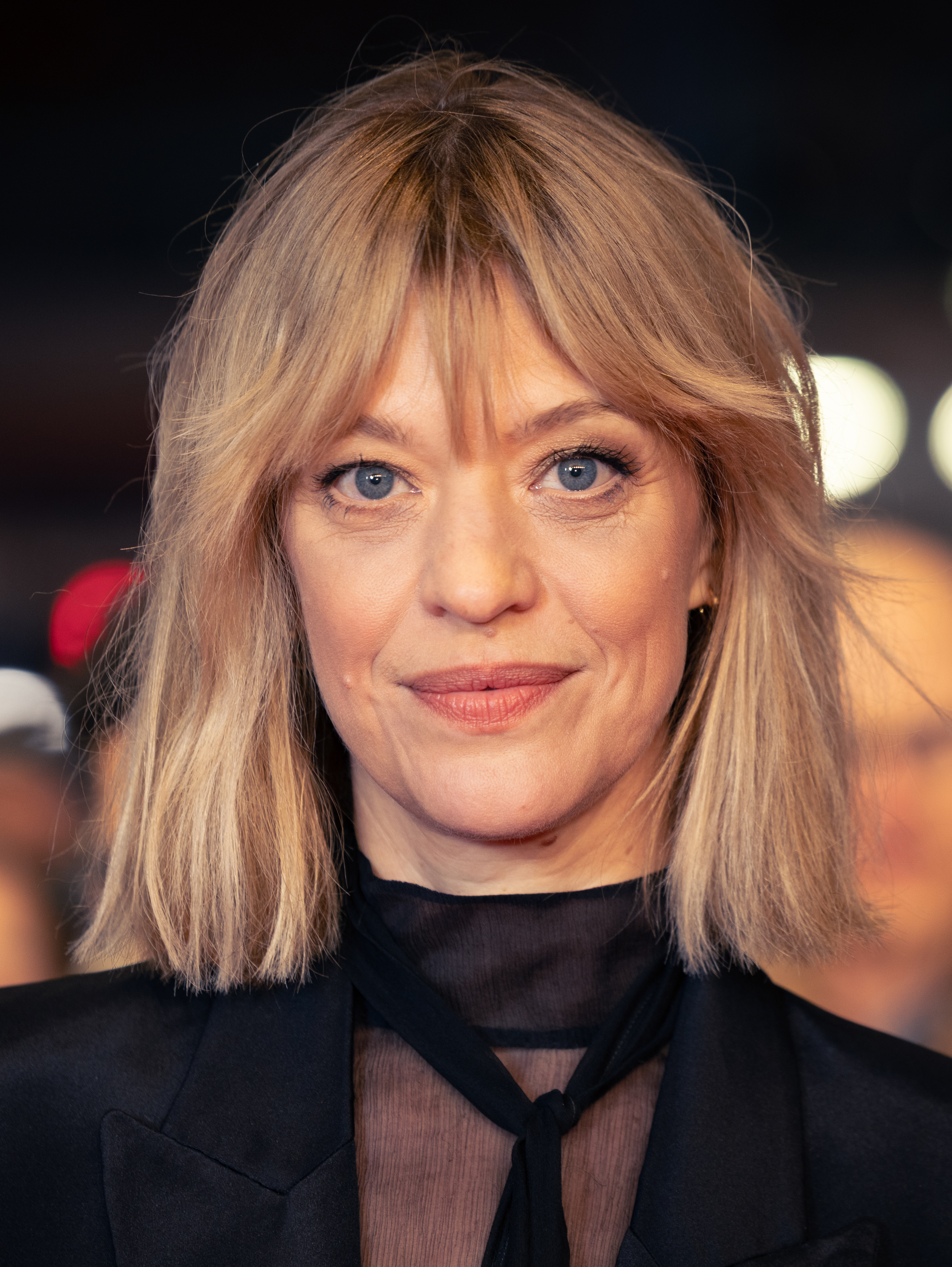
- Makatsch at the 2025 Berlin International Film Festival
- Born: 13 August 1971 (age 55); Düsseldorf, West Germany
- Occupations: Actress, voice actress, singer
- Years active: 1993–present
- Partner(s): Daniel Craig (1996–2004); Max Martin Schröder (2004–2014); Trystan Pütter (2017–present)
- Children: 3
- Relatives: Rainer Makatsch (father)

Heike Makatsch (German: [ˈhaɪkə ˈmakatʃ]; born 13 August 1971) is a German actress. She is known for her roles as Lisa Addison in Resident Evil (2002), Mia in Love Actually (2003), as Liesel's mother in The Book Thief (2013), and as Carlotta Klatt in Where's Wanda? (2024).

== Early life ==
Makatsch was born in Düsseldorf, West Germany, the daughter of former German national ice hockey team goaltender Rainer Makatsch. She spent several months in New Mexico in 1988 in an effort to improve her English, and later studied politics and sociology at the University of Düsseldorf for four semesters, which was followed by an apprenticeship as a dressmaker until 1994.

== Career ==
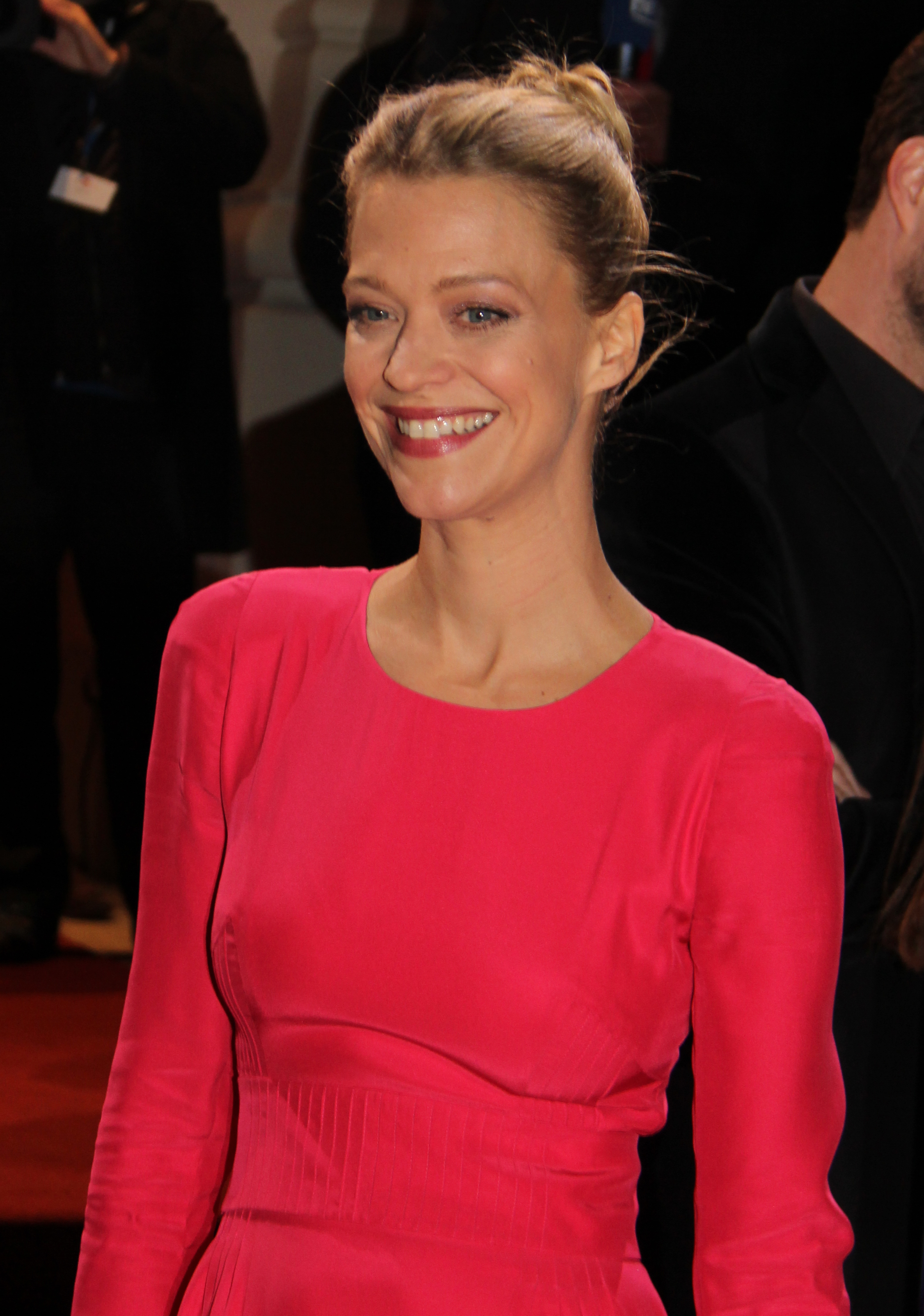
Makatsch at the 2012 Hessen Film and Cinema Prize

Makatsch's television career started in 1993, when she was hired by music channel VIVA, hosting shows such as Interaktiv and Heikes Hausbesuche; two years later, on 13 August 1995, she became the host of the German chart show Bravo TV, aired by RTL II, a position she kept until summer 1996. In 1997, she started hosting her own weekly, late night show titled Heike Makatsch Show. However, due to bad ratings, it was canceled after only eight episodes.

Makatsch first appeared in a film in 1996 when she starred in Detlev Buck's Männerpension (English: "Jailbirds"). She received the Bavarian Film Award as the most talented young actor for her performance. Since then, she has appeared in several German and English language productions including the romantic comedy Love Actually (2003). She is perhaps best known for her role as Lisa Addison, Matt's sister in the video game-based sci-fi/horror film Resident Evil (2002).

She voiced Terk in the German dub of Disney's Tarzan.

Since 2012, Makatsch has been a face for French cosmetics company L'Oréal.

Makatsch served on the jury of the Goldene Kamera awards in 2017.

== Personal life ==
Makatsch was in a seven-year relationship with British actor Daniel Craig, ending in 2004.

She has three daughters, born in 2007, 2009, and 2015; the first two are with musician Max Martin Schröder, from the German indie band Tomte. She has been in a relationship with actor Trystan Pütter since 2017.

As of 2022, Makatsch lives in Berlin-Zehlendorf.

== Awards and nominations ==
In 1995, Makatsch won the Bavarian Film Award for Best New Actress for her role in Männerpension. In 2003, she and the rest of the cast of Love Actually were nominated for the Phoenix Film Critics Society Award for Best Cast. She was nominated in 2006 for an International Emmy Award for Best Actress for her role in Margarete Steiff – A Story of Courage.

== Selected filmography ==
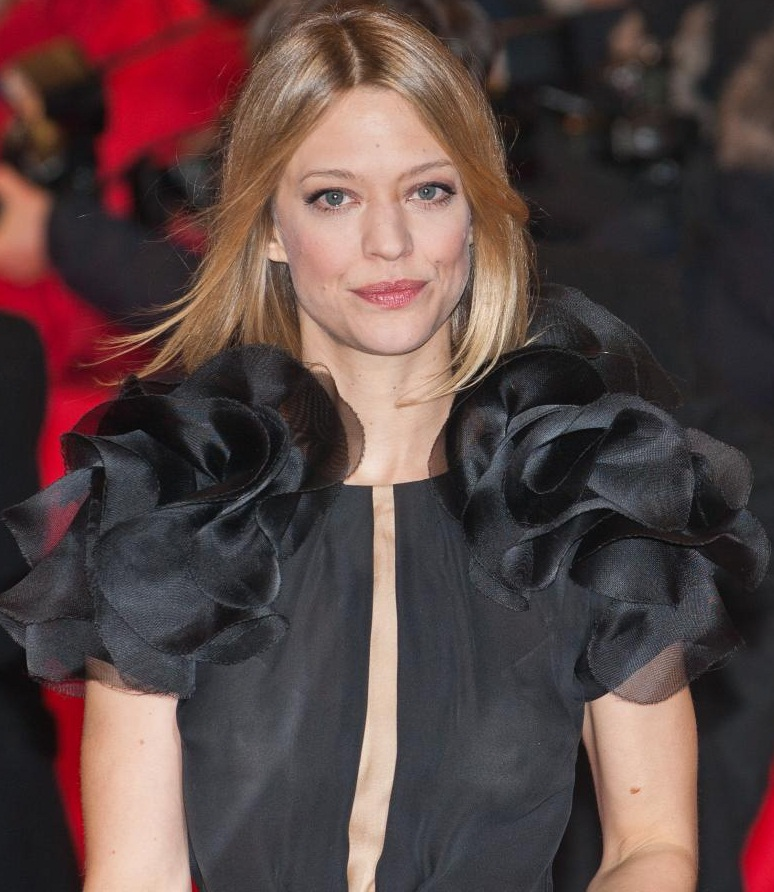
Makatsch at the 2012 Berlin International Film Festival

| Year | Title | Role | Notes |
|---|---|---|---|
| 1996 | Jailbirds | Maren Krummsieg | |
| 1997 | Obsession | Miriam Auerbach | |
| 1998 | Killer | | Short |
| 1998 | Am I Beautiful? | Vera | |
| 1998 | Love Your Neighbour! | Isolde | |
| 1999 | Das Gelbe vom Ei | Floris Blinker | TV film |
| 1999 | Aimée & Jaguar | Klärchen | |
| 1999 | Men and Other Catastrophes | Judith Kern | TV film |
| 1999 | Camino de Santiago | Tea | TV miniseries |
| 1999 | Tails You Win, Heads You Lose | Maja | |
| 2000 | Longitude | Queen Charlotte | TV film |
| 2000 | Gripsholm | Prinzessin | |
| 2000 | The Announcement | Rumour | |
| 2001 | Late Night Shopping | Madeline Zozzocolovic | |
| 2001 | A Goddamn Job | Katinka Sirena | |
| 2002 | Die Affäre Semmeling | Silke Semmeling | TV miniseries (6 episodes) |
| 2002 | Resident Evil | Dr. Lisa Addison | |
| 2002 | Naked | Emilia | |
| 2002 | At Night in the Park | Katharina Lumis | |
| 2003 | Anatomy 2 | Viktoria | |
| 2003 | Love Actually | Mia | |
| 2003 | A Light in Dark Places | Renate Reger | TV film |
| 2004 | Familie auf Bestellung | Eva | TV film |
| 2005 | Margarete Steiff | Margarete Steiff | TV film |
| 2005 | A Sound of Thunder | Alicia Wallenbeck | |
| 2005 | No Songs of Love | Ellen | |
| 2005 | Tara Road | Bernadette | |
| 2005 | Almost Heaven | Helen Schuster | |
| 2006 | Twisted Sister | Anna | |
| 2007 | Mrs. Ratcliffe's Revolution | Frau Unger | |
| 2008 | Schade um das schöne Geld | Mirabel Blinker | TV film |
| 2009 | The Door | Gia Konrads | |
| 2009 | Dr. Hope | Hope Bridges Adams | TV film |
| 2009 | Hilde | Hildegard Knef | |
| 2011 | Tom Sawyer | Aunt Polly | |
| 2012 | Homecoming | Katarina Endriss | TV film |
| 2012 | Sechzehneichen | Laura | TV film |
| 2013 | The Book Thief | Liesel's mother | |
| 2013 | Back on Track | Birgit Averhoff | |
| 2014 | Charleen macht Schluss | Sabine | |
| 2014 | Everything Is Love | Clara | |
| 2014 | Geography of the Heart | Rachel | Segment "Berlin" |
| 2016–2021 | Tatort | Ellen Berlinger | 3 episodes |
| 2017 | Teenosaurus Rex | Sara | |
| 2018 | The Most Beautiful Girl in the World | Frau Reimann | |
| 2019 | I've Never Been to New York | Lisa Wartberg | |
| 2020 | God, You're Such a Prick | Eva Pape | |
| 2021 | Zero | Cynthia Bonsant | TV film |
| TBA | Vienna Game | TBA | In production |

== Discography ==
=== Albums ===
- 1997: Obsession - soundtrack for Obsession
- 2005: Almost Heaven - soundtrack for Almost Heaven
- 2009: Hilde - soundtrack for Hilde
- 2009: Die schönsten Kinderlieder, with Max Schröder

=== Singles ===
- 1996: "Stand by Your Man", as Heike & Dirk - from soundtrack for Männerpension
- 1997: "This Girl Was Made for Loving" - from soundtrack for Obsession
- 1999: "50 Ways to Leave Your Lover" - from soundtrack for Die Häupter meiner Lieben
