= Sophie Rois =

Austrian actress (born 1961)

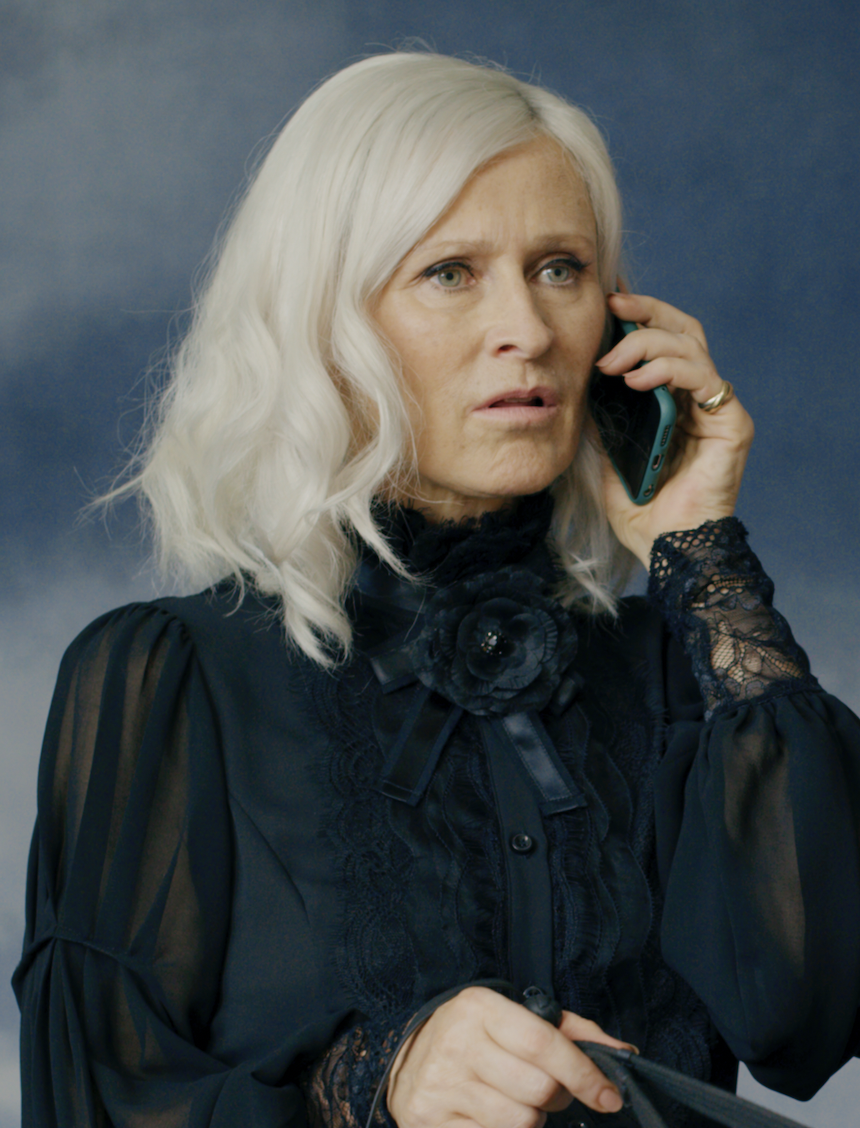
- Rois in 2021
- Born: 1 June 1961 (age 65); Ottensheim, Austria
- Occupation: Actress

Sophie Rois (born 1961) is an Austrian actress who lives and works in Berlin. She has appeared in such films as Three, 180°, Enemy at the Gates and television programmes such as Polizeiruf 110 and Die kleine Monsterin (voice).

== Life and career ==
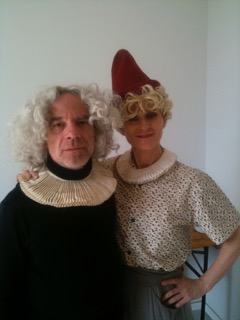
Sophie Rois and Martin Wuttke in 2012

Rois was born on 1 June 1961 in Ottensheim, Austria. From 1983 to 1986, she studied acting at the Max Reinhardt Seminar in Vienna.

Early in her career, Rois was one of the few professional actors Christoph Schlingensief worked with.

In Berlin, Rois worked at Volksbühne (1993–2017) and Deutsches Theater (2018–2022). In 2022, she joined the Volksbühne again.

In 2014, Rois appeared in the documentary The Decent One as Margarete Himmler, wife of Heinrich Himmler.

== Recognition ==
Rois received the first grade of the French Ordre des Arts et des Lettres during Berlinale on 10 February 2014 at the French Embassy of Berlin. She accepted the invitation to become a member of Berlin's Academy of Arts in 2017.

Other awards include:

- 2002 – Grimme Award (for The Manns – Novel of a Century)
- 2006 – German Audiobook Prize: Best Narrator (for Jane Eyre by Charlotte Brontë)
- 2009 – German Film Award (Lola): Best Actress (for The Architect)
- 2010 – Bavarian Film Award: Best Actress (for Three)
- 2010 – Preis der deutschen Filmkritik (for Three)
- 2011 – German Film Award (Lola): Best Actress (for Three)
- 2012 – German Theatre Award
- 2016 – German Audiobook Prize: Best Narrator (for Baba Dunjas letzte Liebe by Alina Bronsky)
- 2017 – Gertrud-Eysoldt-Ring

== Selected filmography ==
- No More Mr. Nice Guy (1993)
- Under the Milky Way (1995)
- Killer Condom (1996)
- Deathline (1996)
- The Captain of Köpenick (1997, TV movie)
- The Inheritors (1998)
- Enemy at the Gates (2001)
- The Manns – Novel of a Century (2001, TV miniseries)
- Learning to Lie (2003)
- Fräulein Phyllis (2004)
- The Architect (2008)
- Three (2010)
- 180° (2010)
- A Pact (2013)
- The Decent One (2014)
- Shiverstone Castle (2016)
- A Hidden Life (2019)
- The Audition (2019)
- Barbarians (2020, TV series)
- AEIOU – A Quick Alphabet of Love (2022)
