= Sonnenallee =

1999 German comedy film by Leander Haußmann

- Directed by: Leander Haußmann
- Written by: Thomas Brussig; Detlev Buck; Leander Haußmann
- Produced by: Claus Boje; Detlev Buck
- Starring: Alexander Scheer; Alexander Beyer; Robert Stadlober
- Cinematography: Peter Krause
- Edited by: Sandy Saffeels
- Production companies: Boje Buck Produktion; Ö-Film; Sat.1
- Distributed by: Delphi Filmverleih
- Release date: 7 October 1999
- Running time: 101 minutes
- Country: Germany
- Language: German

Sonnenallee (Sun Avenue or Sun Alley) is a 1999 German comedy film about life in East Berlin in the early 1970s. The movie was directed by Leander Haußmann in his feature film debut. The film was released shortly before the corresponding novel, Am kürzeren Ende der Sonnenallee (At the Shorter End of Sonnenallee). Both the book and the screenplay were written by Thomas Brussig and while they are based on the same characters and setting, differ in storyline significantly. Both the movie and the book emphasize the importance of pop-art and in particular, pop music, for the youth of East Berlin. Sonnenallee was broadcast in the Czech Republic under the title Eastie Boys.

== Cast ==
- Alexander Scheer as Michael "Micha" Ehrenreich
- Alexander Beyer as Mario Naujoks
- Robert Stadlober as Wuschel
- David Mueller as Brötchen
- Teresa Weißbach as Miriam Sommer
- Katharina Thalbach as Doris Ehrenreich
- Henry Hübchen as Hotte Ehrenreich
- Elena Meißner as Sabrina
- Detlev Buck as Officer Horkefeld
- Winfried Glatzeder makes a brief cameo appearance, reprising his role as Paul from the East German film The Legend of Paul and Paula.

== Plot ==
Michael "Micha" Ehrenreich is a 17-year-old growing up on the East German end of Berlin's Sonnenallee in the early 1970s who enjoys contraband music tapes and other forms of Western culture. After Officer Horkefeld, the neighborhood's overzealous policeman, confiscates Micha's newly-ripped tape, Micha spots local girl Miriam coming out of her apartment and he is spellbound. Shortly after, Heinz, Micha's smuggler uncle from the West, visits and harangues Micha over his intention to join the National People's Army. Later, at a disco, Micha tries to dance with Miriam, but she brushes him off for a West German who is immediately thrown out of the disco by Horkefeld. For allowing a West German into the disco, Miriam is required to deliver a self-critical lecture at the next meeting of the Free German Youth.

At school the next day, Mario alters a government party slogan on their classroom wall to make a lewd joke and when the teacher discovers this, she is told Mario did it. However, Micha claims responsibility in a ploy to impress Miriam with a self-critical lecture of his own. After the lecture, Mario berates Micha for "joining the system" for the sake of a woman. At a black market gathering, Mario meets Sabrina, an existentialist, and feigns an interest in Sartre in order to sleep with her. After a run-in with Mr. Fromm, a sinister-looking neighbor thought by all the other tenants to be a Stasi agent, Micha's father, Hotte, reveals that he has been provided a telephone due to a bogus chronic illness. Miriam calls and asks Micha to visit her, but he is stopped on the way by Officer Horkefeld and, having forgotten his ID card, is detained for over ten hours.

That night, Mario hosts a raucous party at his house. Micha and Mario escape to the balcony, where they are photographed from the western side urinating onto the border wall below. Miriam arrives to a chaotic scene, and leaves after encountering a stoned Micha, who claims that he has written many diaries about his feelings toward her. The next day, Micha and Mario are called into their headmistress' office, where a Stasi agent informs the pair that the photographs of them urinating on the Berlin Wall have made it into the West German press. Due to this, Mario is expelled and Micha loses his student stipend. Micha sees Miriam, who reminds him that he promised to let her read his diaries. Caught in his lie, Micha goes home and begins to write several years' worth of diaries. Doris, Micha's mother, carries out a plan to defect to the West using a stolen passport and makeup, but when she is waiting to go through the border, she gets cold feet and changes her mind at the last moment.

Later, while showing a confiscated Japanese stereo to Heinz, the guard overloads the power grid and knocks the street into darkness. Among the chaos, Sabrina confides in Mario that she is pregnant. Micha's young friend Wuschel, who has an illicit copy of Exile on Main St. is told by Horkefeld to stop as he is near the border. He keeps running and is shot by Horkefeld. Wuschel appears to be dead, but his album stopped the bullet. Discovering the record has shattered, Wuschel is heartbroken.

Nearing the end of his diary forgeries, Micha has a sudden realization about his political beliefs, and reneges on his promise to join the army. As he is leaving, he sees Mario at the recruitment station, who confesses that he is joining the army to provide for his new child. Micha is furious and the two fight in the corridor and end up sobbing together. When Micha returns home, he discovers Heinz – who always claimed the asbestos in East German dwellings would kill someone – dead of lung cancer. Here, the family discovers that their neighbor Fromm is not a Stasi agent and actually works for a funeral company. Doris is allowed back into the West for his funeral, and smuggles his ashes back in a coffee can in order to bury him with their mother. Micha goes to Miriam's house and gives her the diaries, and they share an intimate moment.

Back in Micha's room, he and Wuschel listen to a new Exile On Main St. album, where they discover it is a forgery. Below, a crowd of people gathers, looking at them and listening to the music, including Horkefeld, who is now reduced to a street-sweeper (presumably due to shooting Wuschel). The film ends with the crowd getting caught up dancing to the western music and moving to the border where the soldiers in the guard tower join in, one of whom accidentally fires his AK-47 while playing air guitar, making the crowd laugh. The film ends with a long black and white shot of the border gates opened and the street abandoned.

== Reception ==
Reception to the film was largely positive, with praise for Haußmann's direction of the characters and the nostalgic feeling that the film evoked. Some reviewers noted that the majority of the cast and crew had themselves grown up in East Germany, which played into the portrayal of East German society in the film, while others considered the portrayal of East Germany too rosy, and accused the film of having a "negligent political carefreeness."

== See also ==
- Ostalgie
