= Leander Haußmann =

German theatre and film director (born 1959)

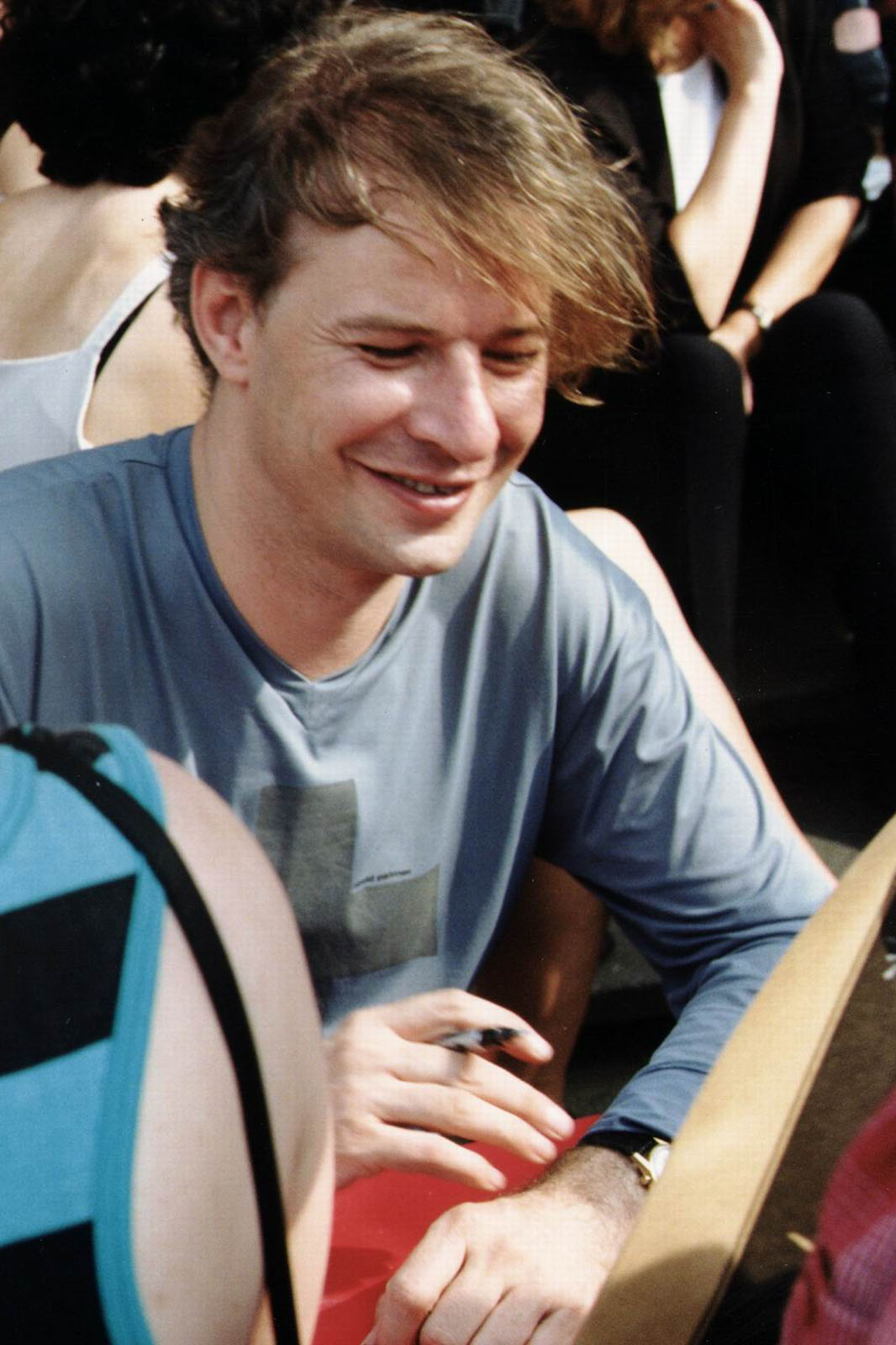
Leander Haußmann upon leaving as director of the Bochum Theatre, June 2000

Leander Haußmann (sometimes Haussmann) (German: [leː.ˈʔan.dɐ ˈhaʊ̯s.man]; born 26 June 1959) is a German theatre and film director.

The son of actor Ezard Haußmann and costume designer Doris Haußmann, he was born in Quedlinburg and attended the Ernst Busch theatre school in Berlin.

Haußmann was the theatre director of the city theatre in Bochum (Schauspielhaus Bochum). He also wrote and acted in several plays (1995–2000), and had a role in the Detlev Buck film Jailbirds (1996). His feature film breakthrough came with Sonnenallee in 1999. His second feature, Herr Lehmann, followed in 2003. His production of Die Fledermaus in Munich was controversial, compounding the trouble surrounding his production of Peter Pan. As a result, his scheduled production of Romeo and Juliet was cancelled.

== Filmography ==
- Sonnenallee, with Detlev Buck, Robert Stadlober, Alexander Beyer (1999)
- Denk ich an Deutschland … – Die Durchmacher (2001, TV documentary series episode)
- Berlin Blues (2003)
- NVA, with Detlev Buck, Kim Alexander Frank, Jasmin Schwiers (2005)
- Intrigue and Love, with Götz George, Katharina Thalbach, August Diehl (2005, TV film)
- Why Men Don't Listen and Women Can't Read Maps, with Benno Fürmann, Jessica Schwarz, Uwe Ochsenknecht (2007)
- Robert Zimmermann Is Tangled Up in Love (2008)
- Dinosaurier – Gegen uns seht ihr alt aus! (2009)
- Hotel Lux (2011)
- Teenosaurus Rex (2017)
