= Joachim Król =

German actor (born 1957)

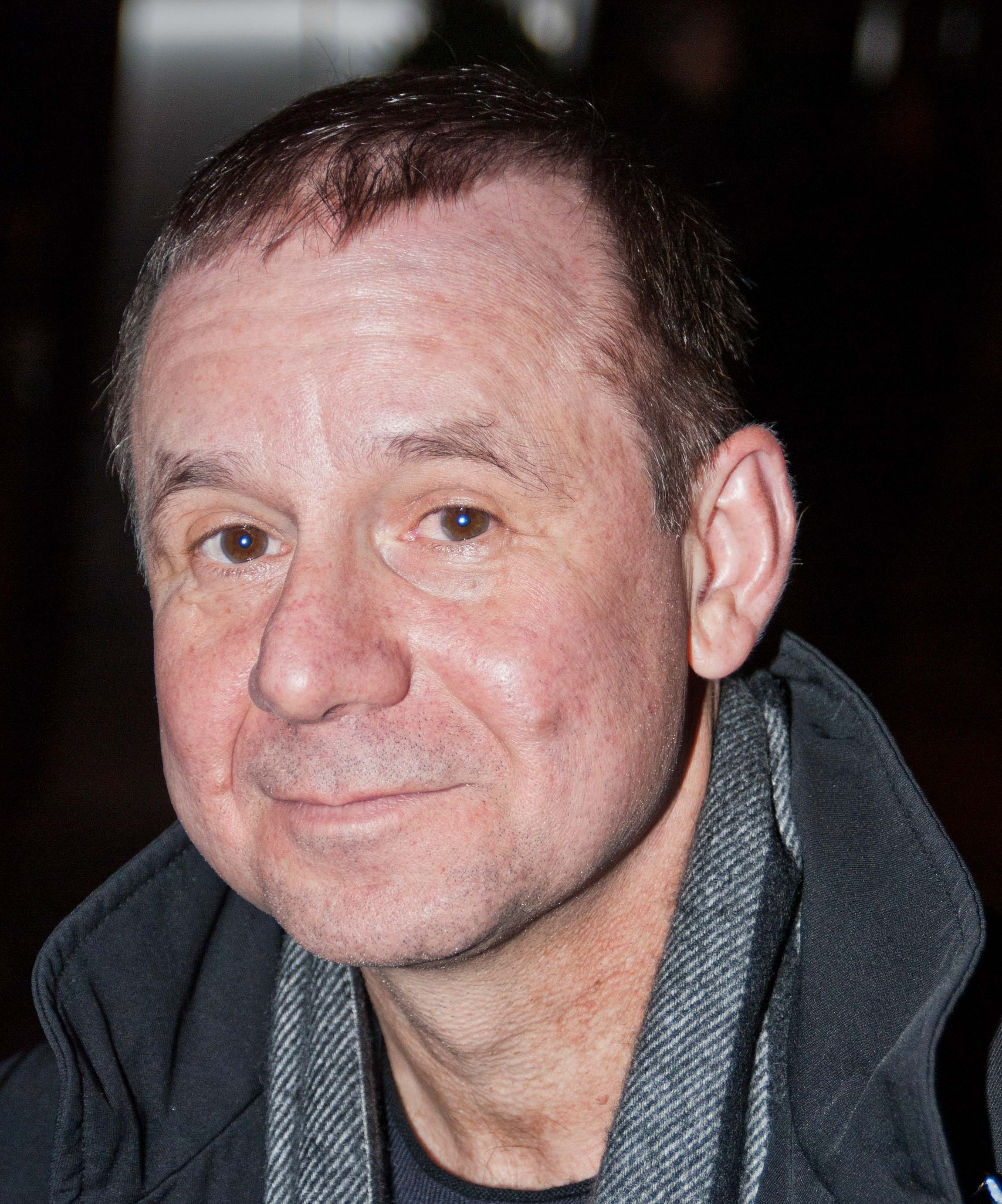
- Joachim Król at the Berlin Film Festival in 2009
- Born: 17 June 1957 (age 69); Herne, West Germany
- Occupation: Actor
- Years active: 1984–present
- Spouse: Heidrun Teusner Krol

Joachim Król (pronounced [ˈjoː.a.xɪm kʁoːl], born 17 June 1957 in Herne, West Germany) is a German actor, known for his appearances in the films Run Lola Run, Maybe, Maybe Not, and Anne Frank: The Whole Story.

== Early life and education ==
Król was born in Herne, West Germany, and studied from 1981 to 1984 at the Otto-Falckenberg-Schule in Munich. His grandfather was a miner of Silesian descent.

== Career ==
Król is best known as a film and television actor. In 1993, he starred in the film No More Mr. Nice Guy. In the 1998 film, Run Lola Run, Król portrayed the homeless man, Norbert von Au. He is also known for playing Hermann van Pels in the TV film Anne Frank: The Whole Story (2001). Despite his notable cinema and television success, Król returns repeatedly to the stage. Several times he has played in the Bochumer Schauspielhaus and the Schauspielhaus Köln.

== Personal life ==
Król is married to Heidrun Teusner Król, with whom he has a son, Tom.

== Selected filmography ==
- Wherever You Are... (1988) as Eduard
- No More Mr. Nice Guy (1993) as Rudi Kipp
- Deadly Maria (1993) as Dieter
- Maybe, Maybe Not (1994) as Norbert Brommer
- Nobody Loves Me (1994) as Anton
- The Superwife (1996) as Dr. Enno Winkel
- It Happened in Broad Daylight (1997) as Kommissar Matthäus
- When the Light Comes (1998) as Lars
- Trains'n'Roses (1998) as Hannes
- Run Lola Run (1998) as Norbert von Au
- Die Unschuld der Krähen (1998, TV film) as Georg Finke
- Gloomy Sunday (1999) as Laszlo
- The Princess and the Warrior (2000)
- Donna Leon (2000–2003, TV series), Episodes 1, 2, 3 & 4 of the Commissario Brunetti Series as Commissario Brunetti.
- Anne Frank: The Whole Story (2001, TV film)
- Soundless (2004)
- Silentium (2004)
- The Crown Prince (2006)
- The Three Robbers (2007) as Räuber (voice)
- Adam Resurrected (2008)
- Friends Forever (2009) as Waldemer (voice)
- Henri 4 (2010) as Théodore-Agrippa d'Aubigné
- Tom Sawyer (2011) as Muff Potter
- Tatort (2011–2015, TV series), 7 episodes as Kommissar Frank Steier
- Lost in Siberia (2012) as Matthias Bleuel
- Rivals Forever: The Sneaker Battle (2016, TV film) as Christoph Dassler
- Boarding-School Intrigue (2017, TV film) as Herbert Wichert
- Mack the Knife: Brecht's Threepenny Film (2018)
- All About Me (2018)
- Berlin Alexanderplatz (2020)
- The Postcard Killings (2020)
- Confessions of Felix Krull (2021)
- Weekend Rebels (2023) as Grandpa Gerd
- A Million Minutes (2024) as Werner Küper

== Awards ==
- 1994: Won: Bavarian Film Awards, Best Actor
- 2007: Won: Hessian Film Award, Best Actor, (for Windland)
