= List of Heimat episodes =

German film series episodes

This is an episode guide for the film series Heimat created by Edgar Reitz.

| Film | Episodes | Runtime | Originally released |
|---|---|---|---|
| Heimat | 11 | 924 mins | 16 September 1984 |
| Die Zweite Heimat | 13 | 1509 Minutes | 4 March 1993 |
| Heimat 3 | 6 | 761 Minutes | 15 December 2004 |
| Heimat Fragments | 1 | 146 minutes | 2 September 2006 |
| Home from Home | 1 | 225 minutes | 28 September 2013 |

== Heimat ==
Starting with episode two, there is an introductory narration by Glasisch-Karl who recaps events during and between the previous episodes, using snapshots of the main characters to jog viewers' memories.

| No. in series | Title | Released |
|---|---|---|
| 1 | "The Call of Faraway Places / Fernweh" | 1919-1928 |
After serving in the Great War, Paul Simon returns home to Schabbach, a rural village in the Hunsrück. Paul is welcomed back by his father, Mathias, a blacksmith, and his mother Katharina (née Schirmer), as well as his sister Pauline and brother Eduard, who did not fight in the war due to his health issues. Other residents of the village greet Paul back too, including Paul's cousin, Glassich-Karl, also a veteran, who was sent home earlier with a disfiguring skin condition caused by poison gas. All except Paul gossip and share news of local and wider news stories, as well as obituaries from local soldiers who died in the war. Further gossip includes the village’s mayor, Alois Wiegand who flaunts his purchase of the first motorcycle in the village, as well as Apollonia, a girl with black hair who some villagers believe is a gypsy. In 1922, Eduard helps organise the unveiling of Schabbach's war memorial to its fallen sons. The following year the French army occupies the region of Ruhr Valley. Paul has developed a passion for radio communications in his spare time, which Alois Wiegand helps fund to bring wireless to the local areas. Meanwhile Paul has become attracted to Apollonia. Paul does not share his fellow villagers opinions of her, including a nasty rumour that after she became pregnant by a Frenchman, she killed and buried her own baby in the midden (dung heap). A search is organised but instead of a corpse being unearthed, Alois Wiegland's lost motorcycle is. Unable to bear the cruelty of villagers, Apollonia leaves the village for good. During a picnic at Burg Baldenau, Paul successfully gains a longwave wireless signal that everyone listens to amazed. Later Paul states his love for Maria. They marry and have two sons: Anton and Ernst. Pauline and Eduard, visit the neighbouring town of Simmern. While Pauline gazes at the window of a Robert Kröber‘s jewelry shop, stones are thrown at the apartment above it, which is owned by a Jew. A shard of glass pierces Pauline's hand and Robert, who she later marries, invites her in to help take out glass. Later on Pauline's hand becomes dangerously infected and her mother, Katharina, cures it with a home remedy. In 1927, Eduard, Glasisch-Karl and the bell ringer Glockzieh, become obsessed with panning for gold in nearby streams. They find a shiny pieces and take it to Robert Kröber for testing, but it turns out to be only copper oxide. Nevertheless the trio persist in believing that gold abounds the mountains and streams of the Hunsrück. Shortly after this, Paul, his father Mathias and several other men from the village are working in the forest when they find the naked body of a murdered woman. Paul is assigned to watch it while they summon the police. This strikes up more village gossip and interest. Mathias asks Paul to make a trap to catch a pine marten that has been killing the family's hens. The following day Paul sets off for a beer but never returns. Maria, upset on Paul’s disappearance, questions villagers on his whereabouts.
| 2 | "The Centre of the World / Die Mitte der Welt" | 1929-1933 |
In Schabbach, the pine marten is caught in the trap Paul made and the murdered woman’s blood-soaked clothes are discovered. Maria struggles with Paul’s absence. Meanwhile, Paul arrives at Ellis Island in New York and Pauline continues to live in Simmern with her husband watchmaker Robert Kröber. Eduard continues to pan for gold which causes his lung condition to worsen. Mathias sells one of his fields so Eduard can travel to a Berlin clinic to be operated on. After being cured, Eduard wanders into a brothel and meets the madam, Lucie Hardtke, who takes a fancy to him. Lucie chooses to believe that Eduard belongs to a wealthy landed family, and he does not contradict her. Eduard and Lucie marry and visit the Hunsrück. As they approach Schabbach, Eduard, wishing to delay and soften Lucie’s disappointment on the revelation of his family's poverty, he distracts her by showing her his beloved woods, fields, and streams of his childhood. Pauline and Robert visit the family home, with Eduard and Lucie arriving soon after. Although initially crestfallen, Lucie quickly plans a future in Hunsrück and vows to put Schabbach on the map. Lucie hopes Eduard will have a grand career since the newly installed Nazi Party has promised opportunities will be available for all men of talent regardless of birth. Alois Wiegand, now sporting a Hitler mustache, also views the Nazi party as a means of personal advancement for himself and for his son, Wilfried, whom he dispatches to Berlin to join the SS. Alois, Pauline and Eduard are enjoying the good times, while Katharina is mistrustful of it. With the approach of Hitler's birthday, Alois organizes a public celebration. Katharina, however, refuses to participate and leaves for the industrial city of Bochum on the Ruhr to visit her brother, Hans Schirmer, whose birthday falls on same day as Hitler's. Katharina stays for three months, and witnesses the arrest and deportation of her nephew, Fritz, a union official and Communist sympathizer. His family is told Fritz is being sent for re-education to a concentration camp in Mühlheim. No longer understanding the world in which she lives, Katharina returns home, bringing with her Fritz's young daughter, Lotti. Eduard has encouraged Maria's young son Anton to join the Hitler Youth, however after he tries on the uniform, Maria quietly disapproves of it. Katharina asks Anton to promise to never wear it again. Lotti becomes ill with diphtheria and an epidemic is discovered in the village and surrounding areas, causing the deaths of a few children. Katharina nurses and helps Lotti pull through.
| 3 | "The Best Christmas Ever / Weihnacht wie noch nie" | 1935 |
Eduard has become mayor, and a new telephone network now connects Schabbach to the outside world. Lucie is disappointed with the village and Eduard's lack of ambition, as his photography obsession leaves little room for higher interests. Lucie becomes friendly with the district's new Gauleiter, who coincidently shares the Simon surname. Eduard and Lucie move to the neighbouring village of Rhaunen. Lucie commissions a luxurious villa, "with fifty windows", which they pay for with a loan from a bank owned by Jewish people. The teenaged Hänschen Betz, son of the Schabbach basketmaker, stumbles across a labor camp under construction. Hans is blind in one eye from a childhood accident. A soldier notices this and suggests that having one eye will help Hans become a skilled sharpshooter. Hans gets into serious trouble by using the newly installed ceramic telephone insulators for target practice. Eduard shields him, however, persuading the Nazi officials that Hans's skills will be very useful to his country. Eduard and Lucie have a son called Horst and Wilfried Wiegand returns to the Hunsrück, as an SS official. Lucie, sensing that Wilfried has made useful political connections in Berlin, befriends him. She offers the use of her villa as a suitable place for Party bigwigs to stay if they are ever in the region. On Christmas Eve, the villagers attend mass, but Alois Wiegland stays home and listens to Horst-Wessel-Lied on the radio. Wilfried organizes a top-secret meeting of high-ranking Nazi officials at Lucie and Eduard's villa. It is a social triumph for Lucie. The officials, however, are in too much of a hurry to stay for the expensive and elaborate dinner that Lucie had prepared for them. Crestfallen at their speedy departure, Lucie begins plotting new strategies to advance Eduard.
| 4 | "The Highway / Reichshöhenstraße" | 1938 |
Pauline and Robert Kröber have since had two children, Gabi and Robertchen. Maria and Pauline visit the cinema in Simmern to see the latest movie starring Zarah Leander. They are taken with the fashionable clothes and striking hairstyle of the movie star. When they return to Pauline's house they have a few drinks and playfully try to copy the star's elaborate curls on their own foreheads. Maria, who has been leading a completely selfless life, confides to her Pauline that she is attracted to Otto Wohlleben, the civil engineer who is supervising the Organisation Todt a road-building crew that is building a highway through the region. The kindly Otto and his colleague Fritz Pieritz are lodging with the Simons family. Otto helps Ernst to build a model airplane and starts to become attracted to Maria. One day, Pieritz brings Otto back with his arm in a cast after being in an accident. Maria helps Otto feed himself. Katharina says to Matthias they must give Maria some time for herself. Some months later they attend a village dance and declare their love to each other. Anton has caught the photography bug from his uncle Eduard, who encourages him. Using a cheap projector in the Simon barn, Anton shows newsreels and films that Eduard has given him. In nearby Rhaunen, Lucie's old friend Martina arrives in the Hunsrück region from Berlin. Martina flirts with the men of the Todt work crew and invites them to a party at Lucie's house. Lucie fears for her and Eduard's reputation if her history with Martina should become a topic of village gossip. She tries to prevent Martina from leaving the villa and going into town. However, Eduard is pleased with the way things have turned out and wishes they could remain just as they are.
| 5 | "Up and Away and Back / Auf und davon und zurück" | 1938-1939 |
Lucie crashes her car, which kills her visiting parents. It is commented they are the first people to be buried on the land, without ever having seen it. Maria and Otto are now together and watch Zarah Leander in Carl Froelich's new film Heimat. Martina flirts with Rudolf Pollach, an apprentice clockmaker staying with Robert and Pauline. A letter arrives to Schabbach from the Simon-Electric Corporation of Detroit, announcing that Paul is still alive and intends to visit. Lucie is impressed by Paul’s American status and teaches her son Horst a poem to recite to Paul when he arrives. Maria becomes distraught having learnt about Paul and breaks up with Otto. Otto becomes transferred to Trier, and later loses his job as the Nazi Party has discovered his mother is half-Jewish. Maria and Otto meet up and sleep together, but Maria’s mind is focused on Paul. Maria and Anton travel to Hamburg, to greet Paul but he is not allowed to disembark from the ship without proof of his Aryan heritage. Ernst is looked after by Wilfried who soon enlists him in flying school. Maria telegraphs home to Eduard who, with Wilfried, assists in searching local records for evidence. Eduard becomes frantic, worried that the Jewish loan to build his villa will be revealed. Without finding documentation in time, Paul is forced to sail back to America. Adolf Hitler announced on the radio that Germany has invaded Poland. Katharina and Glockzieh state their anxiety of this news, while Alois proudly repeats it around the village. Robert leaves home to surrender their car to the Western Front, as the war needs all vehicles they can find. Pauline takes money out of the bank, and the clerk tells her this will all be over in a few weeks.
| 6 | "The Home Front / Heimatfront" | 1944 |
When an RAF plane crashes in the woods, Wilfried kills the injured English airman in cold blood, but informs his superiors that the pilot tried to escape. As many of the Hunsrück men have been called up, including the still absent Robert, the women are left managing the farmland with the help of French POWs. Katharina feeds two of the POWs, but Wilfried, now the region's SS commander, openly threatens that if she were not family, he would condemn her to higher authorities. She retorts he is not a real man for staying home instead of fighting. Anton is serving in Russia in the Eastern Front, and sends his pregnant fiancée, Martha, to Schabbach, where she is welcomed by Maria, who now works delivering the post. Ernst has joined the Luftwaffe as a trainee, and meets Otto and Pieritz who are now working in a bomb disposal unit. Otto learns that Maria has had their baby, a young boy called Hermann. The authorities allow Anton and Martha to marry by proxy over the only phone in the village, located at the Wiegand residence. Ernst concludes the marriage celebrations by flying over the village, dropping a bouquet of flowers. When accompanying Lucie to the church so she can say a prayer for the marriage, Eduard notices a card commemorating Hans, who has perished in Russia dated 15th January 1944. That evening, Lucie proudly holds a wedding reception. Wilfried makes a comment about the Jews going 'up the chimney', which no one understands, despite Pauline’s questioning. Eduard sits thinking about Hans, whose death has gone unnoticed in the village.
| 7 | "Soldiers and Love / Die Liebe der Soldaten" | 1944 |
Anton is working in the propaganda film unit and is detailed to make fake newsreel footage, including an execution which disturbs him. Otto and Pieritz pass through Schabbach and Otto meets his young son Hermann for the first time. Otto and Pieritz enjoy a night in the Simon household. Katharina’s niece, Lotti flirts with Herr Specht who works in the local homefront. Lotti shows Specht the fine linen and chins of the household. That night Maria talks about how the war conflict comes close to home, with Allied bombers passing over the Hunsrück on a regular basis. Otto and Maria spend the night discussing what might have been for them both. The next day Otto is killed while attempting to defuse a bomb. Then later on in March 1945, the anti-aircraft battery is destroyed in an air raid, and several locals are wounded, while Specht is killed. With the US forces closing in, Lucie dresses as the housemate in an attempt to avoid appearing as the lady as the house. Her and Eduard will be forced to give up their home to become the Allied HQ. Lucie however quickly begins to consider the advantages of having the 'Yanks' in their home. Wilfried is a broken man, and later imprisoned due to his involvement in the SS.
| 8 | "The American / Der Amerikaner" | 1945-1947 |
In late April, Martina searches Berlin for Rudolf Pollack and finds him badly wounded. While she plays a piano, Pollack dies. She dresses in his uniform and heads out into the street, where she is killed by Soviet soldiers, having been taken for a German soldier. News travels to Schabbach that Anton is in Turkey. Ernst, however, has been shot down over France and is kept hidden by a Frenchman. Pauline believes Robert is dead, but Maria encourages her to believe he is alive. The village have created a good rapport with their American occupiers, who Lotti makes good terms with. On May 13th, Paul returns to the village in a chauffeur-driven limousine. Paul discovers his father Mathias passed away earlier that year on 23rd January. Walking into the family forge, he clangs the hammer against the anvil. The sound attracts the villagers. Katharina recognises Paul instantly with joy and Glasisch-Karl proudly repeats Paul's corporation postage address once again. Lucie rushes over to make Paul's acquaintance and prompts Horst to recite the poem he was once taught, albeit with minor updates. Maria acts distantly, ambivalent about Paul's arrival. Soon after, a young woman, Klärchen, arrives too, claiming Ernst has sent her and entrusted the family will keep her. Maria disapproves, but lets her stay. Paul holds a reception in the village hall for his family and friends. Alois shouts insults out of his window to the 'American', Paul, saying he wants nothing to do with him as it was the Americans who imprisoned Wilfried. Maria denies Paul's request for them to sleep together. When she asks why he left decades before, he is unable to provide a satisfactory answer. In 1947 Paul visits Germany again. Pieritz visits Schabbach with hopes to stay, but Maria tells him to leave. Katharina wishes Pieritz will visit again. Eduard drives Paul around the region, and they stop at a bar. Unknowingly to them, Ernst sits nearby proudly showing his latest flame diamonds he has attained through various misdemeanours since the war has ended. On 10th May, Anton arrives home, after walking over five-thousand kilometres home from Russia. Katharina is proud her family are back together, but after reading about political propaganda in the newspaper, she heads upstairs for a nap. A little while later Maria discovers that Katharina has passed away in her sleep. Paul is unable to stay for the funeral, and Maria is sceptical about his promises that he will stay in touch. Anton excitedly tells Martha about his ambition to open an optical instruments factory, and the Hunsrück is the perfect place due to its clean country air.
| 9 | "Little Herman / Hermännchen" | 1955-1956 |
Hermann aims to become the first member of his family to go to University. Wanting to stay in Ernst's large home, teenage Hermann along with his friends, including Clemens Bengardt, cycle to the Rhine. Ernst has acquired a Sikorsky helicopter and is transporting lumber for his father-in-law's sawmills. Outside a carnival by the river bank, Schnüsschen Schneider, teaches Hermann how to kiss. Anton's company has boomed, and many locals, including Lotti, Klärchen and Pieritz, now living in the region, work at his factory. During a festival to celebrate Anton's company and the way it is putting Schabbach on the map, Anton tries to persuade local smaller farmers to sell and join him. Lotti and Klärchen sing at the festival, and later return drunk to the Simon home. Their bedroom is adjacent through Hermann's, and after he repeatedly enters their room, Lotti tells him to either stay in or out. Lotti remarks he is not little anymore. Hermann stays with them and drinks. Worrying Maria might hear them, they lock their door. In bed together, Hermann touches Klärchen under the covers, she does not object. Hermann starts to masturbate, then Lotti continues for him. Both women talk casually about the evening's activities, and after Hermann climaxes they comfort him, saying it is very natural. While washing clothes the next morning at the Simon house, Klärchen tells Hermann he was very sweet but must keep it quiet. Hermann starts to fall in love with her, and eventually she responds. He begins writing her songs and poetry and they commence a secret love affair between one another, even though Klärchen is eleven years his senior. Ernst's marriage collapses and he hopes to borrow money from Anton to further advance his flying ambitions, but Anton refuses. One day, Lotti discovers Klärchen jumping from the hay loft in the Simon barn, in hope of miscarrying Hermann's baby. Anxious to not get him into trouble, she leaves the village and has an illegal abortion. She tells Hermann that Anton has fired her and she needs to find work elsewhere. The fragile, but still money hungry Alois and his son, the now middle-aged Wilfriend, released from prison, are both using insecticides on their farm, which is polluting the air around Anton's factory. Anton has an argument with them at their house, and after returning to his factory he meets an angry Hermann who accuses him of driving Klärchen away. Lotti reveals she left by herself. Unable to believe this, Hermann cycles to Koblenz and he and Klärchen go camping in the rain. After writing frequently, through a go-between, one letter from Klärchen to Hermann gets sent to the Simon House. Maria reads it and learns about their relationship and the abortion. Maria and Anton, furious because Hermann is still a minor, threaten to call the authorities and take legal action if Klärchen ever contacts Hermann again. However, Ernst agrees to be the couple's go-between and on New Year's Eve, Hermann steals Anton's Mercedes and meets Klärchen for a final time. Enranged by his family's disapproval of his romance with her, Hermann vows to never fall in love again. And that once he legally can, he will leave the Hunsrück all together.
| 10 | "The Proud Years / Die stolzen Jahre" | 1967-1969 |
The town gets colour television, impressing Anton's children Marlies and Hartmut. Anton's factory gains an international reputation and industrialists from Brussels arrive with a takeover offer of sixty million marks. Needing time to think and unsure on what to do Anton contacts his father Paul, who has since sold his business and is now in Germany at Baden-Baden. Paul has set up a studio with Hermann, who since studying in America, has become a well known composer of electronic music. Ernst has begun supplying locals more modern windows and doors, to update their homes, convincing them that aluminium and stone would be 'fashionable'. However, he is then selling their traditional wooden doors and furniture to café owners who are seeking retro-looks. Paul encourages Anton to demand more for his factory and to enjoy his fortune as Paul is himself. Anton is not convinced by Paul's casual say on the situation and approach to power of wealth. Anton announces to his staff he will reject the deal, and sends his secretary, Lotti, to telegraph the industrialists the update. Anton catches Ernst scouring their family home for heirlooms that he can sell. They both agree, disagreeing with each other's business tactics. Pauline tries to convince Maria that it is not too late for them to travel the world, and they have enough money saved up. Maria is worried about leaving her cow behind, but later sells it. Hermann is invited to give a live concert on the national radio. The villagers of Schabbach gather at the inn to listen, as the piece has been inspired by the Hunsrück. The residents show a disinterest, while Glasisch-Karl listens intensely. Maria is also unimpressed, and feels she does not understand her son Hermann even more after he visits her along with two girlfriends. As the war memorial is removed, Glasisch-Karl reminisces about when it was first installed and Ernst flies over head in his plane.
| 12 | "The Feast of the Living and the Dead / Das Fest der Lebenden und der Toten" | 1982 |
Glasisch-Karl narrates over a family tree that details the ancestry of the Simon, Wiegard and Schirmer families. In 1949, Eduard and Lucie lost their own son, Horst, who died after discovering a landmine in the forest. They died in 1967 and 1978 respectively. Pauline and Maria never traveled together, and Pauline died in 1975. Glasisch-Karl confirms Pauline's suspicions that her husband, Robert died during the war. Maria's father and brother, Alois and Wilfried have also since died. Lotti Schirmer has married Sepp Vilsmeier and adopted two Vietnamese children, Hoa and Hou. Anton and Martha have had five children, born between 1945 and 1953. As Glasisch-Karl finishes talking, it is revealed Maria has died. Family from over the world, including relatives from Brazil, have traveled to Schabbach to pay their respects. Hermann almost misses the funeral and arrives during a thunderstorm during which the town has taken cover away from the rain, leaving Maria's coffin abandoned on the road. Both Paul and Glasisch-Karl feel unwell during the post-burial meal. An argument erupts when Anton learns Ernst employees had been preparing to plunder the Simon home, following Maria's death. Anton roughly boards the locked house up and posts the key through the letterbox. While Schabbach prepares its annual festival, Ernst breaks into the family home and reminisces about his past, while Anton stands in the forge, recalling Maria's 70th birthday. Hermann also returns to see the room where he and Klärchen fell in love. The brothers meet in the hallway, and then hear a drilling outside where they discover Paul has fitted a plaque donating the house to the village, as a museum. During the festival, Anton gets drunk with two young ladies and the locals all dance in a snaking line around the village. Clearly in pain Glasisch-Karl staggers with his walking stick towards the village hall, before collapsing. Standing up straight with a good posture, he walks with unweakened strength towards the hall’s open doors, with a light shining brightly outwards. Inside he is returned to his younger self, and recognises all the since deceased villagers. Maria arrives holding a duvet and walks the room, recollecting the names of the villagers she loved. Katharina, Pauline, Robert, Wilfried, Eduard, Lucie, their Horst, Hans the one-eyed boy and finally her beloved Otto. Glancing out of the window, they all watch as the festival takes place. Glasisch-Karl's body is discovered and carried inside, so the death does not ruin the mood of the festival. Hermann hears about an old mine shaft that has great acoustics, and later returns to the town to record a piece performed in the atmospheric mine shaft. Listening from a caravan, he listens as a choir perform a piece called 'Geheischnis'.

== Die Zweite Heimat ==
| No. in series | Title | Released |
|---|---|---|
| 1 | "The Time of the First Songs / Die Zeit der ersten Lieder" | 1960 |
Enraged by his family's disapproval of his romance with Klärchen, Hermann vows to never fall in love again and to leave the Hunsrück forever and to devote himself to music. In Simmern, he performs a final concert. Marie-Groot and Schnüsschen are in attendance. On the train to Munich he is encouraged by Herr Edel that if he wants to succeed, he needs to free himself from all ideology and to choose good friends. With an introduction letter from his music teacher from Simmern, Karl Schiller, Hermann meets Dr. Bretschneider. Across the street above Frau Moretti's dress shop, she offers him a room that will be vacant in a few weeks time. Until then he leaves his trunk with her for safekeeping. Needing a place to sleep, Dr. Bretschneider assistant, Renate Leineweber lets Hermann sleep in her apartment. She attempts to seduce him, but he resists. The next morning at the Conservatoire, Hermann passes his viva voce examination. Impressed by Juan Subercasseaux, a Chilean who can speak eleven languages, including music, they quickly become friends. Juan however fails his examination as they viewed his music as folkloric. Herman comforts him as they play music together, Hermann with his guitar and Juan his flute. They attract medical student, Ansgar Herzsprung, who is working as a sound engineer on a New Wave-style film. The film is produced & directed by Stefan Aufhauser, screenplay by Reinhard Dörr and shot by Rob Stürmer. Herr Edel passes and informs them that the Conservatoire used to be the Nazis' Munich headquarters. On the bus, Hermann bumps into Clemens Bengardt, his old school friend from Hunsrück. Clemens lets him live with him in the coal yard of Kohlen-Josef, who allows them to rehearse in his workshop. Hermann sends for his bicycle, so he can travel around Munich more independently as he feels it is important to quickly know the city. He also takes elocution lessons to erase his rural accent, so he can fit into higher circles. At the Conservatorie, Hermann sees and becomes attracted to Clarissa Lichtblau, a cellist. Looking for a rehearsal room, he becomes interested by an avant-garde piece of music being performed by senior students, including Volker Schimmelpfennig. He is later even more impressed by their concert they perform along with Clarissa. Hermann's excitement is short lived, as he discovers he has narrowly missed a visit by the now-married Klärchen and he renews his resolve to dissolve all links with his past.
| 2 | "Two Strange Eyes / Zwei fremde Augen" | 1960-1961 |
Juan remains in Munich, even though he failed to secure a place at the Conservatoire. He finds a home for his many talents at the Von Zett Drama School, from suggestion of Hermann. In the need for quick cash they both agree to play at a birthday party for a rich art dealer in the suburbs. At the end of the night, to their disappointment the payment is a bottle of Chateaux Lafite Rothschild 1937. Ignoring his own advice to Herman to beware of beautiful women, Juan becomes smitten with Clarissa and accompanies her on a trip to visit her Protestant mother, Herr Lichtblau, in Wasserburg. They both realise, like Hermann, each have lost their fathers and have troubled relationships with their mothers. Clarissa practices on the 1749 Italian cello that had been given to her by her mentor, Dr. Kirchmeier. On the train home they both share a kiss, but agree not to fall in love as it is dangerous. Meanwhile, Hermann becomes enraged as he has discovered his trunk has been stolen. Frau Moretti feels incredibly guilty and begs for his forgiveness. He feels he wants to quit music, but Kohlen-Josef encourages him not to waste his talents. Needing a job to pay the rent, Hermann and Ansgar find a job disposing of decomposing nitrate film at the Munich Film Archive. They feel a sense of pride when discovering Nazi propaganda reels, as they have history in their hands. After attending a musical performance, the students gather at a bar where Clemen's jazz band is playing. Hermann tries to chat up Clarissa and Juan has made the acquaintance Elisabeth Cerphal, who invites the crowd back to her villa, the Foxholes. Clarissa sings to Volker's piano piece. Renate feels out of place at the party, and Hermann feels insecure with the many talents around him, and later ends up sleeping with her. Juan is delighted with his first experience of snow. Hermann receives a visit from Karl Schiller, and his mistress and protégée, Marianne Elz. Hermann catches tonsillitis on his weak heart. They both nurse him for a few days. During recovery, Kohlen-Josef urges Hermann to complete his cello concerto and he asks Clarissa to play it. They kiss on the stairs in her apartment block, but Hermann loses his nerve and runs away. Arriving home, he discovers from Clemen's fiancée, Gabi, that Frau Moretti has recovered his trunk. When he collects it, she tells him all artists need to suffer in order to create. Hermann meets up with Clarissa and Juan as they leave a screening of Stefan and Reinhard's latest film. Clarissa cannot speak as she has tonsillitis. They discover the frozen body of Herr Edel outside the cinema. Clarissa hugs them both, and swears they will be friends forever.
| 3 | "Jealousy and Pride / Eifersucht und Stolz" | 1961 |
After Evelyne Cerphal's father, Arno, dies at the early age of forty-two she discovers that her biological mother is a different woman than she thought, who died in Munich, 1944. Feeling no-longer at home in Neuberg, she leaves for Munich in hope to join the Conservatoire and to search who her real mother was. Planning to move in with her aunt, Elisabeth Cerphal, Evelyne arrives at Foxholes and recalls a visit from her childhood to the villa. Elisabeth's housekeeper, Frau Reis, informs Evelyne that it was once the centre of Bohemian life in the 1920s-30s. Frau Reis reveals that Evelyne's mother was Lieselotte, a girl from a poor family and Arno's family disapproved of their love. Elisabeth's financial adviser, Gerold Gattinger, who lives at the Foxholes, pays an interest in an army film projector that Stefan and Rob install there for a private screening of their new film. It was refused a certificate by the censors, and want to have an "anti-premiere" for all their friends. As the guests arrive, Ansgar becomes angry with his girlfriend Olga Müller due to her drug use, and also takes his frustration out on Gattinger, accusing him of being a closet Nazi. Elisabeth arrives home soon before the film premiere and disapproves of Evelyne arriving unannounced. Frau Reis sets Evelyne up in the library. Hermann becomes jealous of Juan singing with Clarissa, and attempts to make her jealous by creating a musical word play with poet, Helga Aufschrey. Hermann later bickers with Juan and Clarissa about their emotional games they play. Ansgar searches for Olga in the library, but wakens the sleeping Evelyne. He comes enchanted by her voice, and later Evelyne sings along to Hermann and Helga's music piece. Clarissa herself becomes jealous of Hermann's attention towards the other women, and leaves the Foxholes. Realising he could be losing Clarissa, Hermann scribbles a note confessing his love for her. At her apartment, they bump into one another on the stairs and passionately kiss before being interrupted by a neighbour who escorts Hermann off the premises. Clarissa writes Hermann a letter simply stating she loves him, and leaves to post it with only his name and 'Munich' written on the envelope. Back at the Foxholes, Juan is looking through photo albums with Elisabeth. She reveals the villa once belonged to her father's Jewish partner, Uncle Goldbaum, until they helped smuggle him out of Germany in 1935. She feels guilty for profiting from his misfortunes, but reveals he did survive the war only to die recently in Israel. Gattinger is uncomfortable hearing about this, and heads out onto the balcony to see Renate performing Shakespeare down below. The next day, Elisabeth reveals Lieselotte sister, Emmi, is still alive. Ansgar accompanies Evelyne to her Aunt Emmi's dairy shop. Emmi shows Evelyne photographs of Lieselotte, who very closely resembles her daughter. Evelyne then follows her parents footsteps, and while thinking of their love and where she could have been conceived, Ansgar surprises her with his constant negative feelings towards his parents. Yet, she still adores him. Hermann and Clarissa break into the Foxholes and rehearse a cello concerto, that Hermann wrote for her. It is interrupted by Stefan, Reinhard and Helga who then speaks to Hermann about a poem she wrote that he could put to music. Clarissa leaves and Hermann goes after her. He asks if he can see her the next day, but Clarissa remarks she does not know and to wait for fate. Meanwhile, Rob and Stefan travel around Munich, slapping 'Papas Kino ist tot' (Dad's Movies are dead) stickers on landmarks throughout the city.
| 4 | "Ansgar's Death / Ansgars Tod" | 1961-1962 |
Hermann narrates that Ansgar and Evelyne's love last seven months and four days, until he died. He was the first of them to die, and that perhaps it was always written on him. Ansgar has taken a job as a tram conductor. Evelyne and himself spend every waking hour together. He waits outside of her singing lessons in chant and oboe and she his medical lectures. Kohlen-Josef informs Hermann that he was offered a huge sum of money to sell his coalyard. Hermann is disappointed that he'll need to find somewhere else to live. He receives the letter from Clarissa, who he has not seen or heard from in six weeks. It only says "I love you" and Hermann wonders if this was the fate she was talking about as the envelope did not have his address. Clarissa is back home in Wasserburg. She practices on her cello with her mentor, Dr. Kirchmeier, who takes the moment to confess his undying love for her. Clarissa becomes annoyed with her mother's, constant nagging and tells her of the cello piece written by Hermann that she'll perform in a competition. At the Conservatoire, Hermann has written a humorous song for Frau Moretti to sing. Their rehearsal is disrupted by Clarissa's return who announces to Hermann she has won the competition using his cello piece and she'll also be traveling to Neuberg soon to perform it. Evelyne writes home to inform her family to attend Clarissa's concert. Clarissa performs passionately and receives huge praise from the audience. She is photographed and featured in many newspapers, none of which, to Hermann's disappointment, mention him by name as the composer. Hermann reveals he wanted more than a friendship with her, but feels it is now impossible. Clarissa confides in Volker and tells him she is going to abandon the cello. Ansgar sends Hermann a selection of his poems, which he asks him to set to music after his death as he has burned everything else that reminds him of his past and parents. Ansgar feels smothered by them as they want him to succeed with his poems and paintings. Ansgar feels like a failure, and confesses to Evelyne that he is on drugs and wants to quit medicine. At the Foxholes, everyone is preparing for a costume party. Dorli, Helga's friend from home helps repair the lights, much to the amazement of the others. Juan and Elisabeth search the attic for costumes and decorations. During the party, Dorli strip teases to Alex, a perpetual philosophy student. Renate and Gattinger arrive together, she is more relaxed with the crowd now. The mood of the party is dampened when Evelyne arrives announcing that Ansgar has been killed, after trapping his foot in a tram door, and it dragged him down the street. Evelyne return to Ansgar's apartment, to return his clothes. His mother is waiting there and asks Evelyne where all of his paintings, poems and notes are. She replies that he has burned everything. Unable to accept the fact, Ansgar's mother accuses Evelyne of stealing his clothes and items. Hermann and Juan visit Ansgar's grave. Hermann feels they have wasted their time in Munich and Juan casually remarks that he will die when he wants to, like Ernest Hemingway, by suicide.
| 5 | "The Game with Freedom / Das Spiel mit der Freiheit" | 1962 |
Helga states that Corpus Christi Day, 1962 is a day she will never forget. The weather has been very hot for past several days, and a storm is coming. Hermann is now living the Foxholes, and has been giving piano lessons to young spoilt Tommy, the son of a designer and actress, for almost a year at their penthouse. They invite Hermann along on their family holiday to Sylt, to continue teaching Tommy. Helga finds herself caught up in a riot, as youths protest against the arrest of three musicians. Hermann is chased by policemen and they destroy his guitar, which is viewed as symbols of nonconformism by the police. Hermann returns to Foxholes and furiously plays the piano. Helga arrives with a wounded wrist and Elisabeth compares the situation to the Nazi era which erupts Hermann's anger. Both students fear for their lives in Munich and wonder why they are staying in Munich, when all their friends are on holiday. The next day Hermann goes to the local police station and demands compensation for his broken guitar. The police senior suggests they talk with Hermann in another room, but a civilian shouts it is a trap and Hermann escapes after several receiving truncheon blows. Hermann for the first time in two years, decides to leave Munich, hitchhiking a ride for Sylt. Helga leaves for her family home in Dülmen. She frequently distracts herself from her ultra-conservative family with the company of her friends, Dorli and Marianne Westphal. Passing by to Sylt, Hermann visits Helga and the four retire to Dorli's flat above a cake shop. He plays them Beethoven's 'Sturmsonate'. As they adore the music, the three girls rub ointment onto his back from the injuries he acquired. They start to seduce one another, but it abruptly ends when Helga passes out from the heat. Helga turns twenty-three the next day and she spends her birthday with her friends. That night Dorli brings a cake in celebration for dinner with Helga's family. Marianne passes Hermann a note which he reads in the bathroom, saying for him to come to her flat later that evening. Helga becomes upset by her family's hypocritical behaviour and crude jokes of the Dorli's cake. Her friends leave, and Helga storms upstairs to her bedroom to be alone with Hermann. They both declare their love for one another and she becomes determined to lose her virginity with him. It is interrupted by Helga's drunken grandmother shouting at her outside to stop. Helga leaves her bedroom, telling Hermann she will be back once her family are asleep. He locks himself in, and climbs out of the window and leaves for Marianne's flat. Marianne and Hermann have sex. After revealing she is eleven years older than him, Hermann talks about déjà vu. The doorbell rings and a boy passes a letter to Marianne for Hermann, with a note informing they know he is there. The next morning Marianne drops Hermann outside of town and he hitches a lift to Sylt. In the holiday home of Tommy and his family, Hermann discovers the boy casually looking at nude images of women whilst his nudist parents play fight with towels in the garden. Hermann starts to teach Tommy the piano. Five weeks later, Hermann returns to Munich. He picks up a new guitar and at the Foxholes is greeted by Alex and his friends, eating a cake sent to him from Helga, Dorli and Marianne. Clarissa sits in the garden with her wrists bandaged up, but does not reveal why when Hermann asks.
| 6 | "Kennedy's Children / Kennedys Kinder" | 1963 |
Alex wakes on 22 November 1963, a day he'll never forget. Throughout it, he scrounges his friends for money, but none have the time or even money themselves to help him. Hermann is now in his seventh semester and one of the older students he used to envy. Helga helps him around Munich, putting up posters advertising his first concert outside of the Conservatoire, Spuren, dated 14 December. Hermann notices she is in a mood, but does not question it. She reveals why, reading from her diary about her love Hermann rejects. While Hermann conducts music, he notices Clarissa listening nearby. He is furious with her as she left unannounced two weeks previous and especially as she had a cello part. Because of her absence, he had to re-write the entire concert. Clarissa asks him for eight-hundred marks, to which he denies as he does not even have enough money for rent. Hermann does not understand why she does not ask Volker or Jean-Marie, as both are from wealthy families. Now working as a tourist guide, Schnüsschen who now calls herself Waltraud, and turns up at Foxholes looking for Hermann. She is an old friend from the Hunsrück and leaves a letter for him. Alex reads it and is amused she taught Hermann how to kiss. Elisabeth wonders about selling the villa as she has had a generous offer, but says to Alex she'll ask the group, even though they are not round as much anymore. Juan plays the piano and teases Renate about her crush on Hermann. Renate is now at a private drama school. Volker and Jean-Marie arrive at Clarissa's apartment, both with a bouquet of flowers. Clarissa tells hem she is pregnant and one of them is the father, and does not want to keep the baby due to her studying, career, and that she does not love either one of them. Jean-Marie goes straight to the bank for money to help pay for Clarissa's abortion. Alex stumbles upon a filming location, and is pleased to see it is a film Stefan, Reinhard and Rob are shooting. While Alex watches them film, he enjoys the free food provided for the cast and crew. The three film-makers argue over creative differences, ending with Stefan and Reinhard storming off set. Waltraud's tour bus goes past and she waves at Alex. Later, Waltraud bumps into Hermann and Juan at the railway station as they put up posters and they happily reminisce. Clarissa walks through the station and Hermann chases after her, but too late as she already boards a train for Rosenheim. Alex and Helga arrive upon Olga, who is shooting glamour poses at her own apartment in hope of impressing a producer who will making a film in Rome. Helga rants about her dislike of Munich but Olga dismisses it while she fries eggs for Alex. Alone and afraid, Clarissa walks through the Rosenheim streets, noticing every odour. She approaches the basement of a doctor and the abortion operation begins. Renate wanders onto the empty movie set and is offered soup by Bernd, the production manager, who tells her he is unimpressed by the crew's falling out as it is stalling production. Renate auditions for him. At a phonebox, Alex plans to call his remaining friends to ask for money, but finds a wallet with one-hundred and fifty marks left inside. Hermann, Juan and Waltraud go to see Cleopatra (1963 film), only for the screening to be interrupted with the news of the Assassination of John F. Kennedy. As people rush to buy newspapers and gather around TV sets in store windows and bars, Alex and Stefan go to break the news to Helga. They discover she has tried to commit suicide by swallowing sleeping pills, but Stefan saves her life. She has little gratitude for his help. At Foxholes, everyone gathers for the first time in a long while. The film-makers bury their creative differences and Hermann introduces Schnüsschen, Waltraud, to the group.
| 7 | "Christmas Wolves / Weihnachtswölfe" | 1963 |
It has been eleven days since Clarissa's abortion and her tendonitis has flared up again. She visits the Alte Pinakothek but sees her own face in a nun, and feels judged. Hermann has been trying to persuade Clarissa to perform in his concert, but she does not make a decision. While he prepares in the theatre he wants complete silence and becomes frustrated at a tiny noise from a generator. Waltraud visits him with a gift of a new sweater to wear during his concert. As the audience and Hermann's friends take their seats, Helga, who is now in a relationship with Stefan claims to Hermann she is his widow. Clarissa becomes deeply unwell and administered into a hospital. Volker and Clarissa's landlady wait at the hospital. The doctors diagnose her with septicaemia, blood poisoning as well as severe anaemia from her abortion. At Hermann's concert, in order to mock Clarissa's absence he has positioned a topless model with F-holes painted on her back. Evelyne sings a song dedicated to Ansgar. Juan is at Renate's apartment. They have been having casual sex. Renate admits to him she knows she is a stopgap and that Juan cannot get anywhere in life, just like her. When she asks him if she can become a decent actress, he bluntly replies no and shakes his head when she asks if he believes in her talent. Hermann invites his friends back to the Foxholes for celebration after the concert, but is very disappointed when no one shows, only Waltraud. They share a kiss and open a bottle of wine from Freuznach, where she visited with her brother Kurt's wife, her favourite sister-in-law. Volker and Jean-Marie sleep in a car outside of the hospital. It is cold and Jean-Marie suggests they go to Strassberg, but Volker insists on staying by the hospital so he is there for Clarissa. Hermann and Waltraud have sex. Hermann states he hates all the women at the Conservatoire and they are all uptight with their careers, to which Waltraud suggests the women are Bluestocking women instead. Hermann half suggests himself and Waltraud should marry. Anxious to make Hermann proud of her looks, Waltraud lets Olga take her to Frau Moretti's cosmetic salon for a makeover. Since Hermann has heard about Clarissa's illness he has wanted to be alone and avoided Waltraud for a few weeks. Clarissa is now in post-operative intensive car and her mother, Frau Lichtblau, collapses when visiting. Volker gives Clarissa flowers, but her frantic mother believes her daughter is dying. Jean-Marie lets Volker stay at his grand mansion over Christmas in Strasbourg. Helga and Stefan hike the snowy mountains and stay in a cabin. She mocks the present Stefan has bought for her as Christian consumerism. Stefan becomes frustrated over Helga's mind-games. Later in the evening as they start to have sex, she stops and begins mocking him again, questioning his manhood and bourgeois attitudes. She tells him to have sex with her to quieter her, and after he becomes very angry he attacks her, emptying a wine bottle into her face. Clarissa is placed in a room with a new mother in the next bed. The woman's husband and two young daughters come to visit and celebrate Christmas together. Clarissa is in an unfestive mood, and cuts off her hair. Clarissa is pleased to see her mother has visited but after Frau Lichtblau calls Clarissa a murderer, Clarissa storms out of the hospital. She hopes to find Volker or Jean-Marie but with no luck. She cries, realising she is alone during Christmas and visits Foxholes, to which sees Hermann alone in the house. Hermann cuts his hand gathering firewood and Clarissa binds the wound with the bandages from her wrists. They huddle together under a blanket by the stove, but she is hurt when Hermann declares his love for Waltraud and they will marry in the Spring. She settles on the sofa in the library before creeping back in and crawl's into Hermann's bed. They both cry in each other's arms about why they always reject each other's passion. Hermann asks her if she would marry him, but she declines and they lie together in a mournful silence. The next morning as Hermann plays his guitar, Clarissa sings a song about wolves that only exist in tenderness and not love.
| 8 | "The Wedding / Die Hochzeit" | 1964 |
It is New Year's Eve, 1963 and Waltraud spends Christmas at home in the Hunsrück. She is emotionally proud to be home and with her family. When asked if there is a man in her life, she only hints at it. Waltraud leaves the next day for Munich. Juan has been away for three weeks with Renate and her family. Waltraud meets Juan in the park and asks why does he learn languages when he does not visit their countries. Juan responds that he is known for his languages like Stefan, Reinhard and Rob have their film company. But unlike them, no one would notice if he disappears. Waltraud promises Juan can always turn to her. Waltraud and Hermann baby-sit Waltraud's colleague, Elisabeth's children in her grand apartment. Waltraud confesses she has centered her life around Hermann. While Elisabeth's children are sleeping, Waltraud and Hermann have sex. When one of the children, Raoul, wakes up Waltraud sees to him. Hermann shrugs off to himself his comment years before about never to love again. Clarissa travels to Paris on the Orient Express and dreams of Hermann, while he dreams of her. In Paris, Clarissa performs an emotional aggressive piece on her cello. While working, Waltraud gets off her tour bus by the Foxholes for a quick visit to Hermann, but all of the tourists soon follow believing the house to be an attraction. Waltraud improvises and gives them a quick tour of the downstairs until Elisabeth takes over and escorts them all outside, giving them a brief history of the house. She says Hitler never set foot in the house when a tourist asks. Waltraud tells Hermann she has booked an appointment to see an apartment for them both, but they only accept married couples so they will have to pretend to be one. At the apartment Waltraud and Hermann pretend to be a soon-to-wed couple, and after being offered it they celebrate by visiting an expensive restaurant. They mildly complain to one another at the lack of food and high price. Afterwards they go back to the Foxholes and Hermann asks Waltraud to marry him, and she emotionally accepts. It is the day of Hermann and Waltraud's wedding, July 22, 1964. Pauline Kröber, Marie-Goot Schirmer and Pauline's granddaughter, Jacqueline travel to Munich. Pauline, Marie-Goot and Jacqueline arrive at Foxholes and meet Frau Ries, who tells them it is better to stay at the villa than head to the registry office now for wedding. Everyone arrives at the Foxholes. Renate arrives with Herr Alois Brettschneider and says she has moved in with him. Juan is with Annikki, who teaches German. Pauline has brought 14 carat rings for Hermann and Waltraud and says their son Robertchen has taken over the family jewellery shop. In the dining room, Stefan swaps his name tag on the table with Juan's girlfriend, Annikki, so he does not have to sit next to Helga. Evelyne arrives at the Foxholes with her African boyfriend. Marie-Goot has money for Hermann as a gift, but he refuses to take it during dinner. Helga swaps seats with Annikki so she sits next to Stefan. Annikki is now sat by Rob, who flirts with her. Jean-Marie flirts with a waitress. Pauline tells Marie-Goot about all the musicians, filmmakers and actresses in the room that Juan told her about, and none of them rely on Hermann. Juan listens silently to the conversation. Outside the villa, Volker conducts a brass band. Helga becomes attracted to one of the musicians, Vladmir who later have rough sex. Stefan becomes drunk after seeing them both through a window. Juan sits in the garden lost in thought, unimpressed by the music. Rob is still flirting with Annikki. Volker plays the piano and Jean-Marie sings a fast-paced love song and Renate sings a song about tango while Bernd admires her. Waltraud shows Hermann the French kiss she once taught him. Eyes closed, tongue out. Vladmir and Helga talk about life and Stefan taunts her. Vladmir pushes Stefan back who knocks into Reinhard, causing him to spill his drink. Elisabeth and Rolf argue as they leave with their kids for home. Clarissa arrives late at the party, after receiving a scholarship from a distracted Californian maestro. Waltraud and Hermann head for their new apartment alone. Volker says he will miss Clarissa who is leaving for America in a months time. Volker asks if she will spend a weekend with him, and she agrees reluctantly. Volker claims she thinks of Hermann still, but she responds she does not. Clarissa throws her food bowl and laughs in hysterics, then starts crying. Olga plays with Reinhard's rifle, before they leaving it on the window sill. While all of the gang are dancing, there is a sudden gunshot. They all see Reinhard pull the rifle off Juan, with a bloody arm. Juan screams to be left alone. Reinhard tells the others Juan tried to kill himself. Clarissa cradles Juan, crying as she did not even know he was at the party. Stefan shouts at Reinhard for having the rifle in the first place. Stefan and Reinhard fight. Elisabeth stops them, telling them not to fight on her property and it has gone too far. Elisabeth is disappointed in Juan at his suicide attempt, especially because with his many talents he'd have wasted. Rob apologises for flirting with Annika and says they were only fooling around. Volker tells Clarissa he loves her and she tells him to never mention it again. Olga is upset that the men talk about everything except themselves. Alex screams at Juan, as suicide is against everything Alex believes. Stefan aims the rifle at Helga but Elisabeth snatches it off him, he says he was joking, but Elisabeth screams for everyone to get out, and she never wants to see them again as everyone has disappointed her.
| 9 | "The Eternal Daughter / Die ewige Tochter" | 1965 |
Elisabeth has allowed Juan to stay with her at the Foxholes, where he keeps himself occupied laying a mosaic of an Inca god in the garden. Frau Reis is concerned that Herr Cerphal, Elisabeth's father, is dying. Elisabeth visits her father at the hospital, stealing flowers from outside and proudly tells her father about her audacity. Elisabeth tells him that Evelyne has become a real artist and will be singing at the Parisian Opera soon. Herr Cerphal gives Elisabeth the key to his office at Cerphal Publishing, which he once owned and orders her to bring him a brown envelope from the safe. Aware that her father's office holds dark secrets, she attempts to enter the premises at night but becomes arrested after being caught. Juan and Alex drop into Renate's U-boat club, where she performs a cabaret number. Bernd works there too and Stefan and his film editor Fraulein Dagmar are also in attendance. The mood becomes sour as Helga arrives, informing Stefan she is pregnant by Vladimir. Hermann has not seen his friends in months, and now had a baby with Waltraud called Simone, but Hermann calls her Lulu. They live in a cramped apartment with their lodger, Herr Roo. Waltraud frequently asks Hermann if they are preventing him from composing, but Hermann insists he is satisfied with life. Juan arrives back to the Foxholes as police men escort Elisabeth home. Elisabeth fears she will lose everything she loves and claims she has never seen a dead body, not even in the war, to which Juan says maybe she will soon. Upon arriving back to Germany from America, Clarissa is greeted at the airport by her mother and Dr. Kirchmeier. Clarissa discovers her cello has broken during the flight and weeps. Dr. Kirchmeier assures her it will be fixed and perhaps it will sound better than ever. Hermann visits the Conservatoire to collect his diploma, but uses it to keep the rain off himself as he leaves. Elisabeth visits Cerphal Publishing again and is greeted by Herr Von Beck, Dr. Leierseder the senior editor, and Dr. Riebe the legal expert. They have found a document which gives only Herr Cerphal and members of his family access to his office at all times. Alone in her father's office, Elisabeth opens the safe and finds old photos, including one of her father in Nazi Party uniform. She also finds a photograph of her best friend Edith Goldbaum, who Elisabeth believes died in the Dachau concentration camp, after being sent off in 1943. Elisabeth wonders if her father smuggled Uncle Goldbaum to Switzerland. Returning to the Foxholes, she confessed to Juan she has erased the past twenty years in her memory due to being ashamed of what happened during them. Back at the hospital Herr Cerphal tells Elisabeth to rip apart a document which he claims in a sham contract. He tells her that if anyone tries to take claim of the Foxholes she has to kick them out. Questioning who he might mean, Herr Cerphal tells Elisabeth if it is any of the Goldbaum's relatives. Herr Cerphal tells Elisabeth to finish her studies. He struggles to write his will, as his right hand is paralysed. Clarissa and her mother attend a concert with Volker at a piano. Jean-Marie conducting. Juan goes to Hermann's apartment, seeing Hermann happily play with Lulu. After peaking into the concert Juan stands outside of the restaurant where Volker, Clarissa, Jean-Marie and Frau Lichtbeau are having dinner. Elisabeth enquires into doing a course that will impress her father before he dies. She discussed with Juan how her father took the Goldbaum's house, the Foxholes, during war and how he claimed he would give it back after, which he did not. Elisabeth reminisces about her deceased brothers, Peter and Arno and how her father called her the 'grace note'. Something that is not essential. Juan claims that Elisabeth knew her best friend would die and that she always knew whose house it was. Juan also claims Elisabeth loved Herr Gattinger. Elisabeth cries alone in her room. Clarissa goes with Volker to get the cello fixed. Bumping into Waltraud, she introduces baby Simone to her, now four months old. Alex ponders the philosophy of how to enter Foxholes legally, while Helga herself breaks in with friends. At 12:30am, at her father's office, Elisabeth accidentally fires her father's revolver into his chair. Arriving back to the Foxholes at 2am, Elisabeth discovers Helga leading a group of student protesters, wanting to co-ordinate a plan of action against the government's proposed Emergency Laws. Elisabeth confronts Helga, but Helga asserts it was similar bourgeois complacency that allowed the Nazis to seize power. Frau Reis announces Herr Cerphal died at 12:30am. Elisabeth realises that was the same time she fired the gun and feeling somehow culpable, orders the students to leave. On 23 August 1965, Elisabeth with Gattinger, show a conveyancer around at the Foxholes. The council want to buy the land and build 150 flats in its place. Elisabeth realises it will bury her guilt, and they are offered enough money for rest of life and to travel the world. Juan puts the finishing touches on his mosaic.
| 10 | "The End of the Future / Das Ende der Zukunft" | 1966 |
| 11 | "Time of Silence / Die Zeit des Schweigens" | 1967-1968 |
| 12 | "A Time of Many Words / Die Zeit der vielen Worte" | 1968-1969 |
| 1 | "Art or Life / Kunst oder Leben" | 1970 |

== Heimat 3 ==
| No. in series | Title | Setting | Released |
|---|---|---|---|
| 1 | "The Happiest People in the World" "Das glücklichste Volk der Welt" | 1989 | 15 December 2004 |
| 2 | "The World Champions" "Die Weltmeister" | 1990 | 17 December 2004 |
| 3 | "The Russians are Coming" "Die Russen kommen" | 1992–93 | 20 December 2004 |
| 4 | "Everyone's Doing Well" "Allen geht's gut" | 1995 | 22 December 2004 |
| 5 | "The Heirs" "Die Erben" | 1997 | 27 December 2004 |
| 6 | "Farewell to Schabbach" "Abschied von Schabbach" | 1999–2000 | 29 December 2004 |

== Heimat Fragments ==
| No. in series | Title | Setting | Released |
|---|---|---|---|
| 1 | "Heimat Fragments: The Women" "Heimat-Fragmente: Die Frauen" | 1999–2000 & 1960s | 2 September 2006 |

== Home from Home ==
| No. in series | Title | Setting | Released |
|---|---|---|---|
| 1 | "Home from Home" "Die andere Heimat" | 1842–44 | 29 August 2013 (Venice Film Festival); 28 September 2013 (general release) |
