= Bösiger =

Bösiger is a surname. Notable people with the surname include:

- Johannes Bösiger, Swiss/German scriptwriter and producer
- Jonas Bösiger (born 1995), Swiss snowboarder
- Max Bösiger (born 1933), Swiss boxer
