= Kurt Wagner (actor) =

German actor (1953–2023)

Kurt Wagner (1 May 1953 – 28 December 2023) was a German television actor.

== Life and career ==
Wagner was born in Saarlouis in the Saarland, West Germany on 1 May 1953. In 1984, he played the first-billed male character in all 11 episodes of the television historical drama Heimat - Eine deutsche Chronik (equivalent to "Homeland, a German Chronicle"). In the 1990s, he had two more television parts, one in the same role, in an episode of the sequel to Heimat. Wagner died on 28 December 2023, at the age of 70.
