= Andrea Eckert =

Austrian actress, singer, and filmmaker

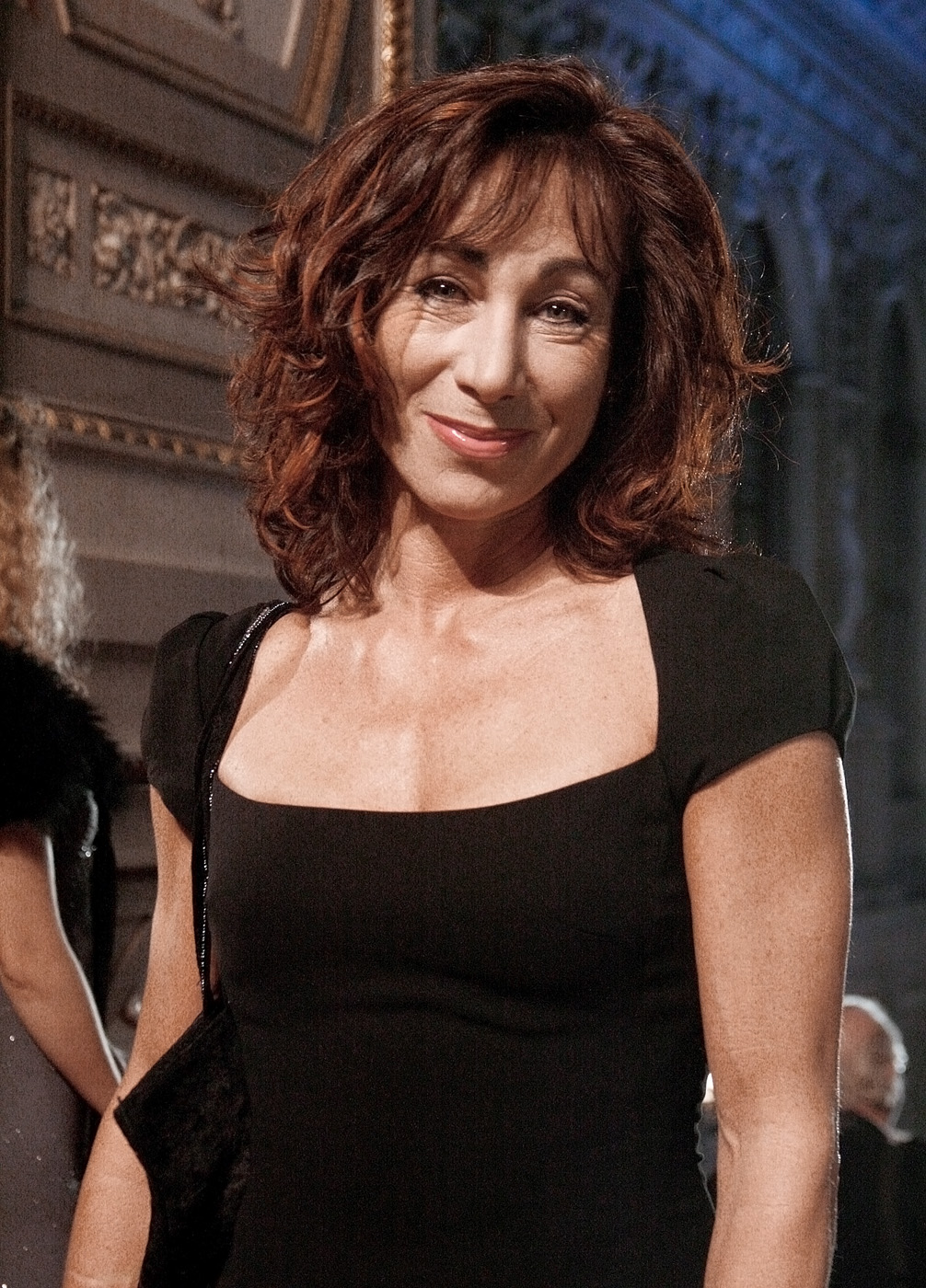
- Andrea Eckert (2010)
- Born: 17 September 1958 (age 66); Vienna, Austria

Andrea Eckert (born 17 September 1958) is an Austrian stage and film actress, singer and documentary filmmaker.

Born in Vienna, Eckert first studied literature in Paris, France, then decided on a stage career and trained with Dorothea Neff. Her roles have included the eponymous heroines in Hebbel's Judith, Schiller's Maria Stuart, Jelinek's Clara S., Sophocles's Elektra, Kleist's Penthesilea, and Maria Callas in Terrence McNally's Meisterklasse (Master Class).

Eckert has frequently appeared on television (for example in guest roles on Kommissar Rex) and in the cinema. She also made documentaries about Lucia Westerguard, Turhan Bey, and Leopold and Josefine Hawelka.

She lives in Vienna.

== Filmography (excerpt) ==
- Kinder der Landstrasse (1992)
- Before Sunrise (1995)
- Zur Sache, Macho! (2013)
