= Children of the Open Road =

1992 Swiss feature/drama film

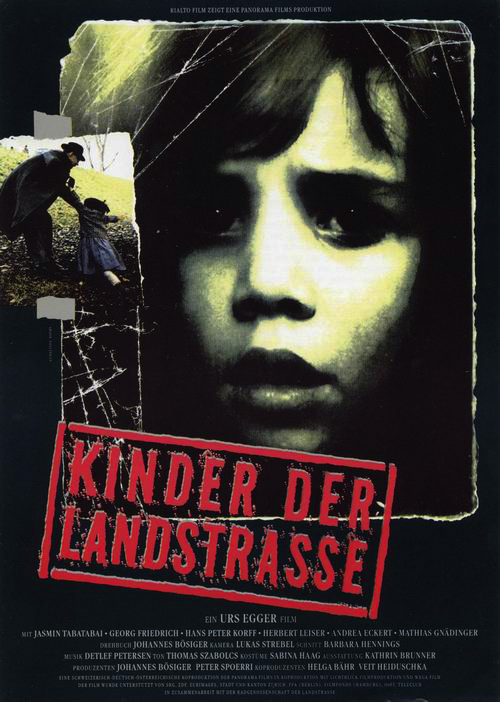
- Kinder der Landstrasse
- Directed by: Urs Egger
- Story by: Johannes Bösiger
- Produced by: Johannes Bösiger; Helga Bähr; Veit Heiduschka; Alfred Nathan; Martin Schmassmann; Peter Spörri
- Starring: Jasmin Tabatabai; Andrea Eckert; Mathias Gnädinger; Nina Petri; Noemi Steuer
- Cinematography: Lukas Strebel
- Edited by: Barbara Hennings
- Music by: Detlef Petersen
- Release dates: May 1992; August 1992 (International premiere)
- Running time: 117 minutes
- Countries: Switzerland; Austria; Germany
- Language: German

Children of the Open Road (German: Kinder der Landstrasse) is a Swiss feature/drama film that was produced in 1992. Its topic is the Kinder der Landstrasse foundation, active between 1926 and 1973, which controversially attempted to assimilate the itinerant Yeniche population of Switzerland by forcibly moving their children to foster homes or orphanages. The historical topic is presented in fictionalized account.

== Plot ==
The Yeniche Kessel family – Theresa, Paul and their five-year-old daughter Jana - escapes the Nazi terror and returns to Switzerland in 1939. They become victims of the Kinder der Landstrasse activities as Jana Kessler (Martina Straessler, Jara Weiss as a child, and Jasmin Tabatabai as adult Jana), in 1939 five years old, is snatched from her parents and consigned to a life of orphanages and foster homes, in order to sever her ties with her culture and to 'assimilate' Jana to a 'better way of life'.

Jana becomes the ward of Dr. Schönefeld, the director of the agency. But the system is not able to 'break' the young woman, and instead endeavours to preempt a new generation's caravans from following their nomadic traditions along Switzerland's country lanes.

Though grown sad-eyed, tough and wary after years as a ward of the state, imprisoned and stigmatized as crazy and unteachable and even declared insane for the same claimed 'reasons' by officials, Jana struggles to unloose the bonds of the system and starts to search for her mother and father. Experienced with foster families and homes, Jana is convinced that she will always, in the eyes of others, be a Gipsy.

As a young adult Jana falls in love with a farmer's son, Franz, and they plan for the future reunion with her parents; in the beginning ignoring that her family has been destroyed by Schönefeld. At the request of her guardian Jana is arrested again and imprisoned by the so-called administrative care, but Franz helps her to escape. The luck (/happiness?) of the young pair is soon overshadowed by Jana's pregnancy.

== Cast ==
- Jasmin Tabatabai as Jana Kessel
- Andrea Eckert as Theresa Kessel
- Martina Strässler as 5 year old Jana
- Herbert Leiser as Paul Kessel
- Jara Weiss as 9 year old Jana
- Hans-Peter Korff as Dr. Schoenefeld
- Nina Petri as Ms Roth
- Mathias Gnädinger as Roger Kessel
- Noemi Steuer as Andrina Kessel
- Andreas Schindelholz as Django
- Andreas Löffel as Nino
- Paul Schirmer as Yeniche man
- Arnold Barri as Yeniche man
- Felix Amsler as Yeniche man
- Johanna Karl-Lory as fortune teller

== Background ==
From 1926 to 1973, the Swiss government had, according to the final report Unabhängige Expertenkommission Schweiz – Zweiter Weltkrieg (Volume 23) of the Swiss parliamentary commission of that name, a semi-official policy of institutionalizing Yeniche parents and having their children adopted by more "normal" Swiss citizens, in an effort to eliminate Yeniche culture. The name of this program, provided by the Swiss children-oriented Pro Juventute foundation, was Kinder der Landstrasse (literally "children of the country road"). In all, about 590 children were taken from their parents and institutionalized in orphanages, mental institutions and even prisons.

== Production ==
The film was produced by Lichtblick Film - und Fernsehproduktion, Panorama Films, Schweizer Fernsehen (SRF), Wega Film and Zweites Deutsches Fernsehen (ZDF) in 1992 on locations in Austria, Germany and Switzerland. As of 1992, Kinder der Landstrasse was the most expensive Swiss film production. It was also the first official co-production of the three German-speaking countries Switzerland, Germany and Austria.

== Cinema and television ==
The film premiered at a public audition in May 1992 in Zürich-Wollishofen. The drama's international premiere was in August 1992 at the Locarno Film Festival. In television, the drama was first aired on 24 February 1994. The film was presented repeatedly at international film festivals, among them the San Francisco Film Festival in 2006 at its 50th anniversary.

== Critical response ==
Lexikon des Internationalen Films (LIF) said, "on the fate of a vagrant family and her daughter in the period 1939–1972, the youth and social welfare of a Swiss charity is denounced, the exercise ideological abuse of power of the demon National Socialist ideas... postponed action that encourages social and social conscience and provides fundamental issues of our Western social system."

The San Francisco Film Festival said, "with refreshing clarity, director Urs Egger's straightforward storytelling serves the film well as cinematic drama, as do fine, naturalistic performances, especially by Jasmin Tabatabai who plays the teenage Jana with determined if bewildered candor... The family's near escape from the Nazis in the beginning casts an ironic light on the film. Whether it comes at the hands of the executioner or by the edicts of the self-righteous bureaucrat, cultural annihilation is the ultimate goal of racism."

== Awards ==
- 1992: Amiens International Film Festival gave the OCIC Award to Urs Egger
- 1992: Fort Lauderdale International Film Festival gave the International Film Guide Award for "Best Foreign Picture" and "Spirit of the Independent Award'" to Johannes Bösiger

== Home media ==
The film was released on DVD in German language.

== See also ==
- Kinder der Landstrasse foundation (1926–1973)
- Yeniche people § Switzerland
