= Nina Petri =

German actress

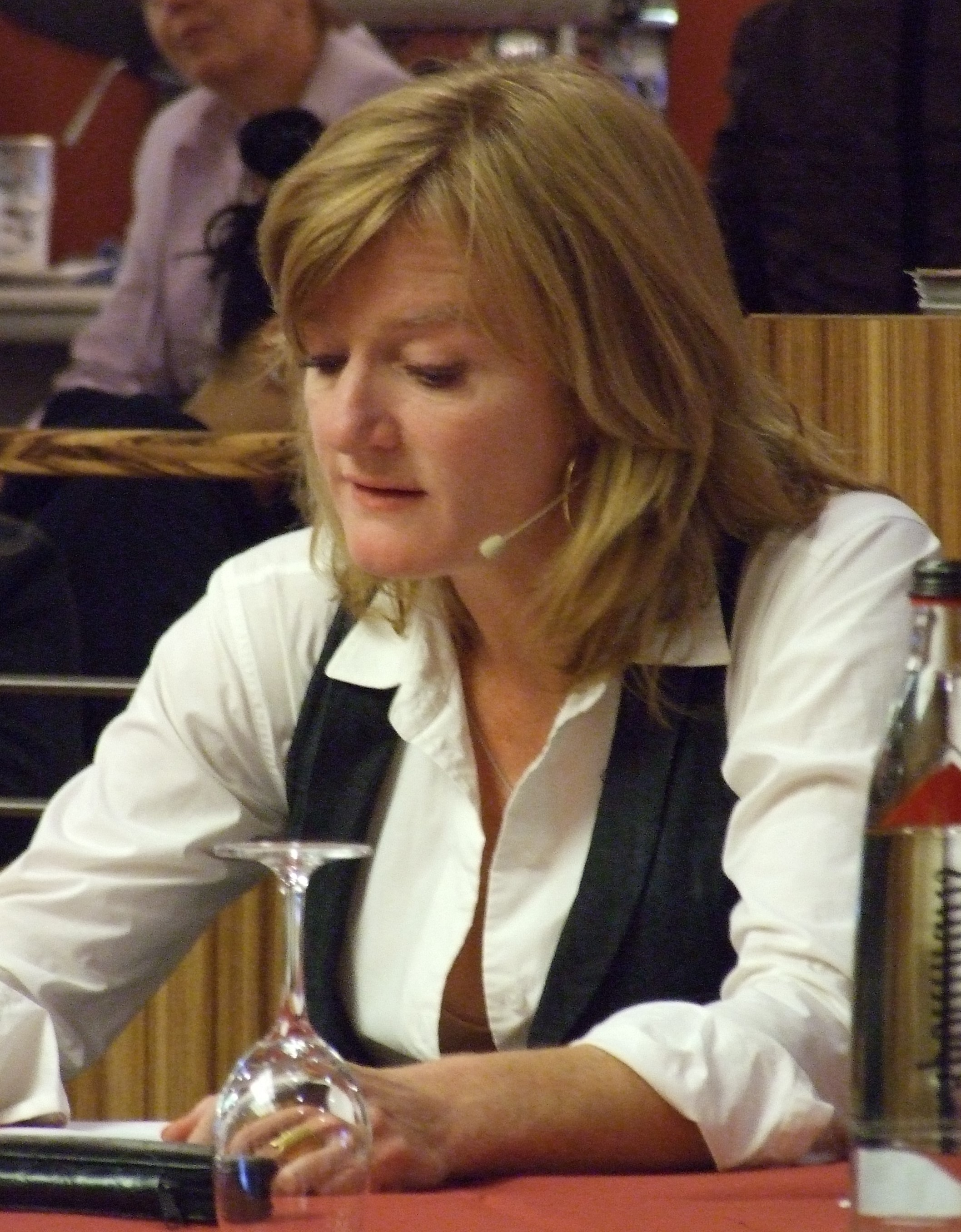
- Petri in Frankfurt am Main in 2009
- Born: 16 July 1963 (age 63); Hamburg, West Germany
- Occupation: Actress
- Years active: 1983–present
- Children: 2

Nina Petri (born 16 July 1963) is a German actress. She has appeared in more than one hundred films since 1983.

== Partial filmography ==
Year	Title	Role	Notes
1992	Kinder der Landstrasse	Ms Roth	
1993	Deadly Maria	Maria	
1998	Run Lola Run	Mrs. Hansen	
2000	No Place to Go	Grete	
2001	The Journey to Kafiristan	Ella Maillart	
2002	Big Girls Don't Cry	Ann	
2003	Angst	Psychiatrist	
2005	The Day Bobby Ewing Died	Gesine	
2006	Emma's Bliss	Dagmar	

== Television appearances ==
Year	Title	Role	Notes
1994-2001	Zwei Brüder	Elise Steininger	
2002	Against All Evidence	Regina	
2013	The Beautiful Spy	Teresa Meier	

== Awards ==
- Bavarian Film Award (best actress) (1994)
- Deutscher Filmpreis (best supporting actress) (1999)
