= Zur Sache, Macho! =

- Written by: Stefanie Veith
- Directed by: Michael Rowitz
- Starring: Max von Pufendorf; Mirjam Weichselbraun; Matthias Buss
- Music by: Joao Jarosch
- Countries of origin: Austria; Germany
- Original language: German

Production
- Producers: Ivo-Alexander Beck; Birgit Kadlac; Alicia Remirez
- Running time: 89 minutes

Original release
- Release: 2013

Zur Sache, Macho! (English title: The Woman in Me) is an Austrian-German film directed by Michael Rowitz. It was released in 2013.

== Cast ==
- Max von Pufendorf as Georg Sommer/Waltraud Winter
- Mirjam Weichselbraun as Lisa Rammser
- Matthias Buss as Micha Sommer
- Tino Mewes as Daniel Spatz
- Wolfgang Böck as Rudi Bauer
- Hilde Dalik as Magda Rammser
- Patricia Hirschbichler as Else Weigert
- Andrea Eckert as Katie Asbach
- Tim Breyvogel as Schneider
- Stefano Bernardin as Julius
- Elena Uhlig as Tiffy
