= The Journey to Kafiristan =

- Directed by: Donatello Dubini and Fosco Dubini
- Written by: Barbara Marx and Fosco Dubini
- Produced by: Fosco and Donatello Dubini
- Edited by: Christel Maye
- Distributed by: Real Fiction Filmverleih
- Release date: September 27, 2001
- Countries: Germany; Netherlands; Switzerland

The Journey to Kafiristan (German: Die Reise nach Kafiristan) is a 2001 drama film written and directed by Donatello and Fosco Dubini.

== Synopsis ==
The film follows Swiss author Annemarie Schwarzenbach's journey through Kafiristan with ethnologist Ella Maillart, who is researching the nomadic people in this region of Afghanistan. As the two explore themselves, they develop feelings toward each other.

== Cast ==
- Jeanette Hain as Annemarie Schwarzenbach
- Nina Petri as Ella Maillart
- Monika Arnó as Dame auf dem Schiff
- Vassilios Avgouteas as Barkeeper
- Matthew Burton as Joseph Hackin
- Christoph Frass as Diener
