= Marita Breuer =

German actress (born 1953)

- Born: 20 January 1953 (age 73); Düren, North Rhine-Westphalia, Germany
- Occupation: Actress

Marita Breuer (born 20 January 1953 in Düren) is a German actress, known for her portrayal of Maria Simon born Wiegand in the Heimat series.

== Biography ==
Breuer studied acting at the Folkwang University of the Arts. Her acting style is based on the Stanislavski method.

Her first professional acting engagement was at Gießen, after which she worked with well-known directors in prestigious theatres - her roles have included

- Petrowna in A Month in the Country by Turgenev, directed by Horst Wede (Cologne)
- The Young Lady in The Ghost Sonata by Strindberg, directed by Ernst Wendt (Cologne)
- Electra in The Oresteia by Aeschylus, staged by Hansgünther Heyme at the Aalto Theatre, Essen
- Kristin in Miss Julie by Strindberg, directed by Roswita Kemper (Düsseldorf)

From 2000 to 2005 she was part of the ensemble cast at the Aachen Theatre.

Aside from her stage work she has appeared in cinema and on television, most notably portraying Maria Simon in the first part of the Heimat Trilogy directed by Edgar Reitz.

Breuer lives in Cologne.

== Filmography ==
- Uns reicht das nicht, dir. Jürgen Flimm, D 1978
- Rote Erde, dir. Klaus Emmerich, D 1983
- Heimat, dir. Edgar Reitz, D 1984
- Vermischte Nachrichten, dir. Alexander Kluge, D 1985/6
- Das Winterhaus, dir. Hilde Lermann, D 1987
- Die Hexe von Köln, dir. Hagen Müller-Stahl, D 1989
- Fremde, liebe Fremde, dir. Jürgen Bretzinger, D 1991
- Geboren 1999, dir. Kai Wessel, D 1992
- Tadesse - warum?, dir. Christian Baudissin, D 1994
- Weihnachten mit Willy Wuff, dir. Maria Theresia Wagner, D 1994
- Deutschlandlied, dir. Tom Toelle, D 1994/5
- Verschwinde von hier, dir. Franziska Buch, D 1999
- The Princess and the Warrior, dir. Tom Tykwer, D 2000
- Das schwangere Mädchen, dir. Bettina Woernle, D 2001
- Die Österreichische Methode, dir. Florian Mischa Böder, D 2004
- Heimat-Fragmente – Die Frauen, dir. Edgar Reitz, D 2004 (with previously unreleased scenes from Heimat, D 1984)
- 24 Stunden, dir. Florian Mischa Böder, D 2005
- Flug der Störche, dir. Martin Repka, D 2006
- The Calling Game, dir. Felix Randau, D 2007
- Die dunkle Seite, dir. Peter Keglevic, D 2007
- Der perfekte Schwiegersohn, dir. Michael Rowitz, D 2007
- Dreibeinige Hunde, dir. Aelrun Goette, D 2008
- Für Miriam, dir. Lars Gunnar Lotz, D 2009
- Berlin 36, dir. Kaspar Heidelbach, D 2009
- This Is Love, dir. Matthias Glasner, D 2009
- Über den Tod hinaus, dir. Andreas Senn, D 2009
- Home from Home, 2013

TV Series

- Tatort - Schwarzes Wochenende, D 1984/5
- Ein Fall für zwei - Die einzige Chance, D 1988
- Tatort - Howalds Fall, D 1990
- Ein Fall für zwei - Kleiner Bruder, D 1995
- Tatort - Bombenstimmung, D 1997
- Der Fahnder - Blutiges Geld, D 1999
- Die Rosenheim-Cops - Die Leibwächter der schönen Barbara, D 2005
- Die Wache - Schatten der Vergangenheit, D 2006
- Die Sitte - Machtspiele, D 2006
- Tatort - Gebrochene Herzen, D 2006
- Großstadtrevier, D 2007
- Cologne P.D. - Guter Bruder, böser Bruder, D 2007
- Maddin in Love, D 2007
- Tatort - Borowski und die heile Welt, D 2009

== Awards ==
- 1984: Bavarian Film Awards, Best Actress for Heimat – Eine deutsche Chronik
- 1985: Deutscher Darstellerpreis
