= Noemi Steuer =

Swiss actress (1957–2020)

Noemi Steuer was a Swiss actress (Basel, 15 January 1957 – 14 July 2020), notable for her role as Helga Aufschrey, in Edgar Reitz's film/TV series Die Zweite Heimat (1993).

Steuer was also an ethnologist, notable for her research of the impact of AIDS in Africa, especially in Mali.

== Filmography ==
- 1992 Kinder der Landstrasse
