= Johannes Boesiger =

Swiss/German screenwriter, director and producer

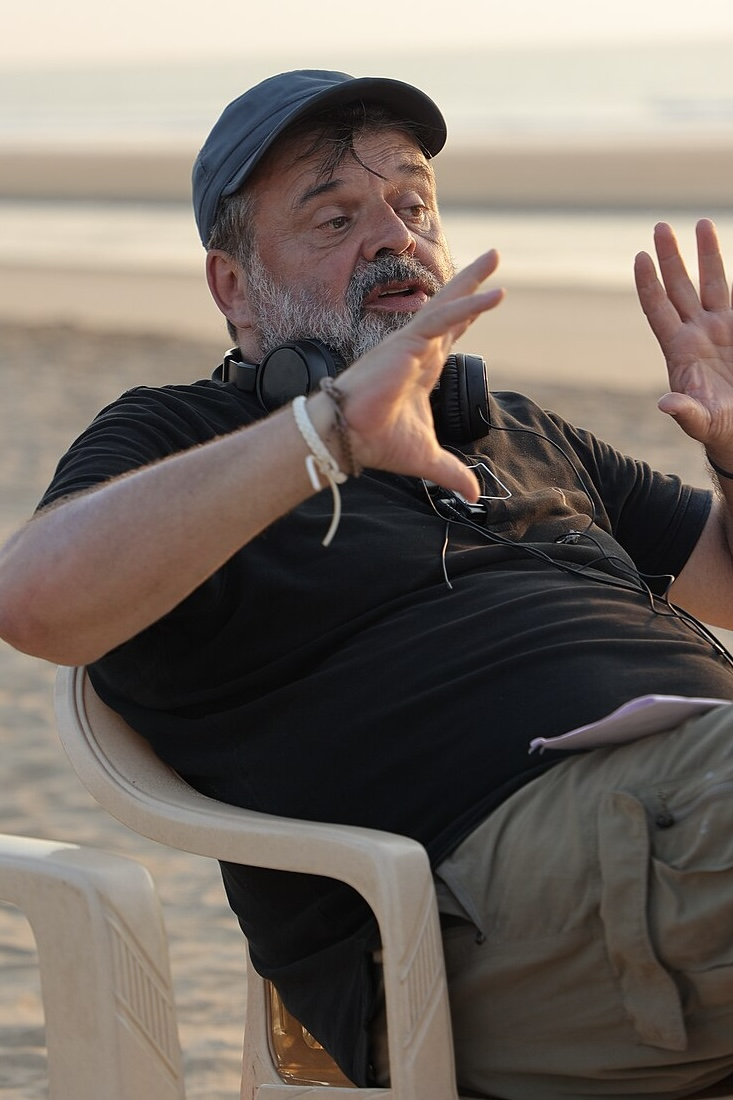
Johannes Boesiger

Johannes Boesiger (born 9 October 1962 in Freiburg im Breisgau) is a Swiss/German screenwriter, director and producer. He is known for his work on Children of the Open Road (1992), Fly Little Bird (2026) and Tatort (1970).

== Life and work ==
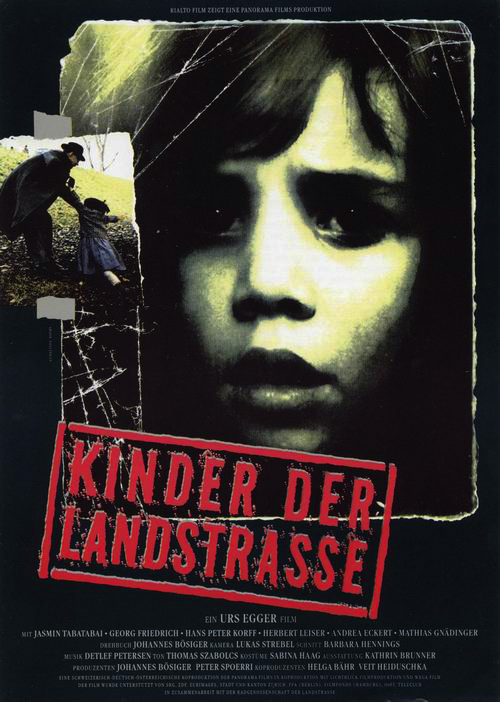
Children of the Open Road, written and produced by Johannes Boesiger in 1992

Johannes Boesiger is the son of the Swiss actor and director Paul Bösiger. Johannes Boesiger was born in Freiburg i. Br. in Germany and at the age of 14, he became a professional actor for the city theatre of Nuremberg, where he played the main character in the play Be Silent, Boy! (Schweig, Bub!) by Fitzgerald Kusz. The same year, he worked as 2nd assistant director for his father. Following the early death of his father, Boesiger moved to Switzerland. At the age of twenty he started to work as a film critic for various newspapers in Germany, Austria and Switzerland including Der Tagesspiegel, Die Presse and Die Weltwoche and in 1984 became film editor at the renowned Neue Zürcher Zeitung. In 1989 Boesiger changed sides again, when he was hired by Swiss television to become an in house producer, script developer and writer.

In 1992, after having contributed to various television and theatrical productions as producer, writer or script editor, he wrote and produced his award winning first feature film, Children of the Open Road. This was followed by further works as executive and line producer before he started a project to develop a cultural centre in the city Zurich in 2001. Boesiger is currently active again as producer, writer and director of various English language projects. In 2018 he was appointed managing director for the production company Jovera Pictures AG/SA/Ltd, overseeing among others the production of Fly Little Bird' based on his own script. He also directed it. He is currently working on his next script Scream, Boy! and on a mini TV series.

Besides his main career as a producer, Johannes Boesiger was active between 1989 and 1995 on the management board of the Locarno International Film Festival, co-founder of the Carl Mayer Scriptwriting award in Graz, Austria, and lately in 2007 together with Dieter Kosslick, was one of the initiators of the section "culinary cinema" at the Berlin International Film Festival today directed by Thomas Struck.

Johannes Boesiger has four kids and lives between Zurich and London.

== Theatre and radio plays ==
Year	Title	Place
1976	Be Silent, Boy! (Schweig, Bub!)	Städtiche Bühnen Nürnberg
1977	Be Silent, Boy! (Schweig, Bub!)	Bayrischer Rundfunk
1987	Korbes	Süddeutscher Rundfunk

== Filmography ==
Year	Title	Role	Notes
1988	Quicker Than the Eye	Producer	Feature film
1989	Tatort - “Howalds Case”	Script and production	Television film
1990	Looking for Salomé	Script editor and producer	6 parts television film
1991	Tatort - “Marion”	Script	Television film
1992	Children of the Open Road	Screenplay and producer	Feature film
1993	Magic Hunter	Co-producer	Feature film
1993	Tuo Yan Ba - The Saltmen of Tibet	Producer	Feature film
1996	Lisa	Line producer	Feature film
1999	Tatort - “Alptraum”	Line producer	Television film
2019	Zabuti (The Forgotten)	Co-producer	Feature film
2026	Fly Little Bird	Producer, writer, director	Feature film

== Awards ==
- 1992 — Best foreign picture for Children of the open road. (Fort Lauderdale Filmfestival)
- 1992 — Grand prix du jury for Children of the open road" (Festival du film d'Amiens)
