= Home from Home (2013 film) =

2013 film

- Film poster
- Directed by: Edgar Reitz
- Written by: Gert Heidenreich; Edgar Reitz
- Produced by: Christian Reitz
- Starring: Jan Schneider
- Cinematography: Gernot Roll
- Release dates: 29 August 2013 (Venice); 28 September 2013 (Germany)
- Running time: 225 minutes
- Country: Germany
- Language: German

Home from Home (German: Die andere Heimat – Chronik einer Sehnsucht) is a 2013 German drama film directed by Edgar Reitz. It was screened out of competition at the 70th Venice International Film Festival. It is shot in black and white, but there are some colour sequences. It is a prequel to the Heimat film series and concerns the Simon family living in the fictional Hunsrück village of Schabbach from 1840 to 1844.

== Cast ==
- Jan Dieter Schneider as Jakob Simon
- Antonia Bill as Henriette (Jettchen)
- Maximilian Scheidt as Gustav Simon
- Marita Breuer as Margarethe Simon
- Rüdiger Kriese as Johann Simon
- Philine Lembeck as Florinchen
- Mélanie Fouché as Lena
- Eva Zeidler as Großmutter
- Reinhard Paulus as Unkel
- Barbara Philipp as Frau Niem
- Christoph Luser as Franz Olm
- Rainer Kühn as Dr. Zwirner
- Konstantin Buchholz as Der junge Baron
- Andreas Külzer as Dorfpfarrer Wiegand
- Julia Prochnow as Hebamme Sophie
- Werner Herzog as Alexander von Humboldt
- Jeroen Perceval as Auswanderungswerber

== Release ==
Home from Home was screened at the Venice Film Festival in September 2013.

=== Critical reception ===
On review aggregator Rotten Tomatoes, the film holds an approval rating of 85% based on 13 reviews, with an average rating of 7.7/10. On Metacritic, the film has a score of 70 out of 100 from 6 critics, indicating "generally favorable reviews".
