= Heimat (film series) =

German film series (1984 - 2013)

- Original movie poster
- Directed by: Edgar Reitz
- Written by: Edgar Reitz; Peter F. Steinbach; (Heimat & Fragments); Thomas Brussig; (Heimat 3 & Fragments); Gert Heidenreich; (Home From Home)
- Produced by: Edgar Reitz; Hans Kwiet; Joachim von Mengershausen; Robert Busch; Christian Reitz; Margaret Menegoz
- Starring: Marita Breuer; Henry Arnold; Salome Kammer; Mathias Kniesbeck; Michael Kausch; Nicola Schössler; Jan Dieter Schneider
- Cinematography: Gernot Roll; Gerard Vandenberg; Christian Reitz; Thomas Mauch
- Edited by: Heidi Handorf; (Heimat); Susanne Hartmann; (Heimat 2 & Heimat 3); Christian Reitz; (Fragments); Uwe Klimmeck; (Home From Home)
- Music by: Nikos Mamangakis; Michael Riessler
- Release dates: 16 September 1984 (Heimat); 4 March 1993 (Heimat 2); 15 December 2004 (Heimat 3); 2 September 2006 (Heimat Fragments); 13 October 2013 (Home From Home)
- Running time: 59 1/2 hours (total)
- Country: West Germany
- Languages: German; Hunsrückisch

Heimat is a series of films written and directed by Edgar Reitz about life in Germany from the 1840s to 2000 through the eyes of a family from the Hunsrück area of the Rhineland-Palatinate. The family's personal and domestic life is set against the backdrop of wider social and political events. The combined length of the five films — broken into 32 episodes — is 59 hours and 32 minutes, making it one of the longest series of feature-length films in cinema history.

The title Heimat (pronounced [ˈhaɪmaːt]) is a German word, often translated as "homeland" or "native region", but due to its German cultural connotations the word has no exact English equivalent. Usage has come to include that of an ironic reference to the Heimatfilm genre which was popular in Germany in the 1950s. Heimat films were characterised by rural settings, sentimental tone and simplistic morality.

Aesthetically, the series is notable for the frequent switching between colour and black-and-white film to convey different emotional states. In 1987 it won a BAFTA for "Foreign Television Programme".

The first film, Heimat, which covers the years 1918 to 1982, was released in 1984. It was followed in 1993 by Die Zweite Heimat, which is set during the 1960s. A direct sequel, Heimat 3 (about the period 1989–2000), was released in 2004, with lead actors from both previous films returning as their characters. Heimat Fragments, released in 2006, was made using unused footage from the previous three films, along with newly filmed material. A prequel film to the original, Home from Home, was released in 2013.

== Background ==
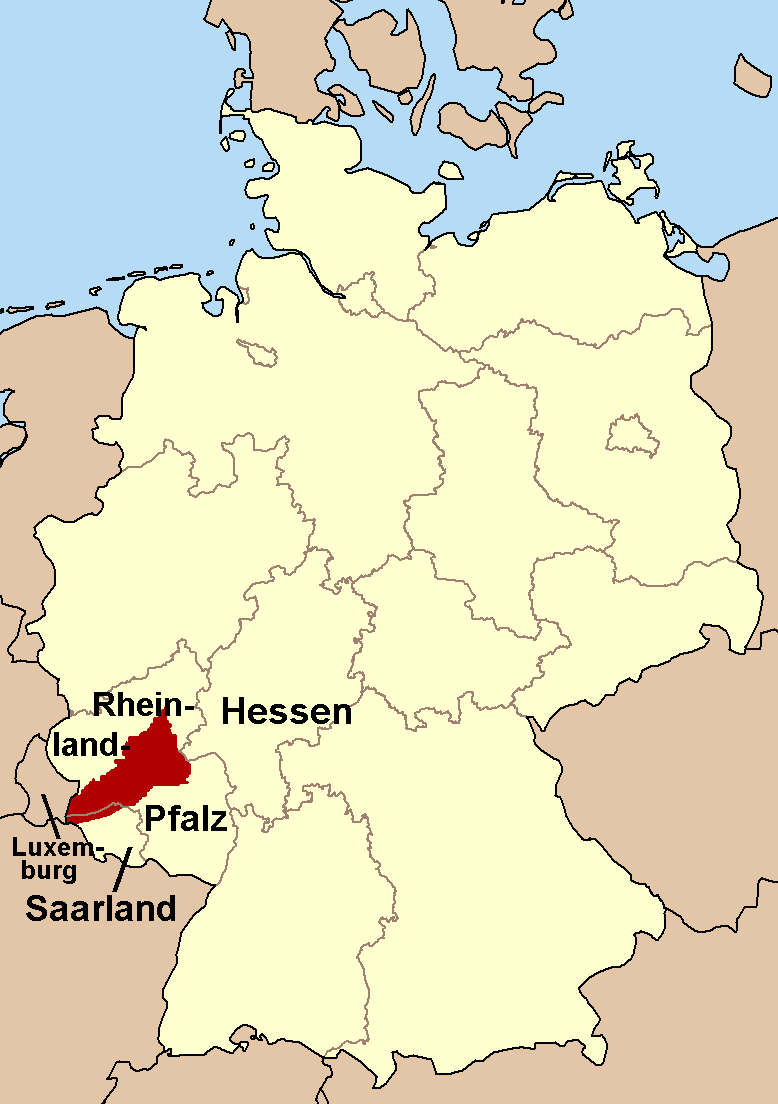
The Hunsrück, shaded red on a map of modern Germany.

=== Tales from the Hunsrück Villages ===
Before creating the Heimat series, Edgar Reitz produced a documentary during 1980–81 about people from his home region, the Hunsrück, where he later set the Heimat series. In Geschichten aus den Hunsrückdörfern (English: Tales from the Hunsrück Villages) he showed people who had not left the region, unlike Heimat's theme of leaving home. This documentary is not considered to be part of the core Heimat series but set the stage for the work to come a few years later.

=== Autobiographical elements ===
Berkeley film and media professor Anton Kaes argued that auteur film-maker Reitz's trilogy was autobiographical. Reitz and Paul Simon, his fictional character in Heimat, had fathers who were skilled craftsmen. Edgar Reitz was born in 1932 and Paul Simon in 1898 in Hunsrück. They grew up there, then left when they were in their twenties and returned in their fifties. Like Hermann Simon in the 1950s, Reitz left rural life for the world of German urban avant-garde arts and intelligentsia. Reitz worked at the Institute of Film Design in Ulm, while Hermann became a celebrated conductor in Munich. Wealthy American entrepreneur Paul Simon returned to Hunsrück only briefly when the war ended, but Hermann Simon's return was more permanent. He and his lover Clarissa restored a house overlooking the Rhine that lay in ruins, eventually composing music for representing and celebrating his relationship to Heimat. Both Hermann and Reitz "dramatized the tensions between staying home, leaving and returning" (Kaes 1989:164), Hermann through music and Reitz through film.

== Development ==
After watching Holocaust, Reitz was offended by the American 'melodramaticisation' of the tragic events and the positive reception the film received. In 1979, Reitz began to make notes of his own life and completed a 250-page screenplay draft based upon his youth. Later in the year, Reitz contacted Peter F. Steinbach and together after what was planned to be a single night, they stayed for the next thirteen months in a small hut in Woppenroth writing a script. They became friendly with the local villagers and invited them to comment on the characters and incidents in the story. In 1980, Reitz and Steinbach completed a 2,000-page screenplay. The success of Berlin Alexanderplatz had convinced television production companies that there was a market for sagas. After some haggling, Reitz managed to secure funding for the length of the script and remodeling of five Hunsrück villages.

Shooting began on the first film in May 1981, and continued for eighteen months. The cast consisted of 140 speaking parts, 32 full-time actors, 15 non-professional actors and 3,862 extras. Many of the cast had limited stage experience or no acting experience at all. While shooting, the villagers became heavily involved in the project and helped with re-modelling or set changes depending on the time period. Villagers put out advertisements in nearby villages in hope to find authentic items that could be used as props.

During shooting, Reitz decided that certain elements required extra emphasis that only colour could provide. However, Reitz was quick to deny any theories behind the alternations between black-and-white and colour.

Thirteen months were required for editing with Reitz working alongside Heidi Handorf. Together they created an eighteen-hour rough cut that was later trimmed to just over fifteen hours. Post-production continued until the premiere at Munich Film Festival in 1984. The entire project had taken over five years to complete.

While making Heimat, Reitz had become interested in developing a series of love stories with the working title of Men and Women. However, in October 1985, Reitz decided to make these tales the basis of Die Zweite Heimat (English: The Second Heimat). The film follows the character Hermann as he leaves to study music in Munich and meets new friends, who are all following their own dreams.

Running at over 25 hours, Die Zweite Heimat took over six years to write and production lasted 557 days, between 1988 and 1992. The cast comprised 71 leading actors, 310 supporting actors and 2,300 extras. The film's soundtrack also became the longest soundtrack ever produced.

== Films ==
Film	Episodes	Release	
Film	Episodes	Runtime	Release date
Heimat	11	15:24 hours	16 September 1984
Die Zweite Heimat a.k.a. Heimat 2	13	25:09 hours	4 March 1993
Heimat 3	6	12:41 hours	15 December 2004
Heimat Fragments	1	2:26 hours	2 September 2006
Home from Home	1	3:45 hours	28 September 2013

=== Heimat ===
Heimat, the original series, premiered in 1984 and follows the life of Maria Simon, a woman living in the fictional village of Schabbach. It was filmed in and around the village of Woppenroth in Rhein-Hunsrück, a rural region of Germany to the west of the Rhineland-Palatinate. Subtitled Eine Deutsche Chronik — A German Chronicle, it consists of 11 episodes running in total to 15 hours 24 minutes of screen time. The film spans 1919 to 1982, and depicts how historical events affect the Simon family and the community in which they lived. At the start of each episode, Karl Glasisch narrates the story so far over photographs by Eduard Simon. The digitally remastered version merged some of the episodes together, resulting in seven episodes instead of eleven. Parts of the introduction were cut.

Heimat episodes
No.	Title	Setting	Runtime	Release date
1	"The Call of Faraway Places" "Fernweh"	1919–1928	119 minutes	16 September 1984
2	"The Centre of the World" "Die Mitte der Welt"	1929–1933	90 minutes	19 September 1984
3	"The Best Christmas Ever" "Weihnacht wie noch nie"	1935	58 minutes	23 September 1984
4	"The Highway" "Reichshöhenstraße"	1938	58 minutes	26 September 1984
5	"Up and Away and Back" "Auf und davon und zurück"	1938–39	59 minutes	8 October 1984
6	"The Home Front" "Heimatfront"	1943	59 minutes	15 October 1984
7	"Soldiers and Love" "Die Liebe der Soldaten"	1944	59 minutes	22 October 1984
8	"The American" "Der Amerikaner"	1945–1947	102 minutes	31 October 1984
9	"Little Hermann" "Hermännchen"	1955–1956	138 minutes	4 November 1984
10	"The Proud Years" "Die stolzen Jahre"	1967–1969	82 minutes	21 October 1984
11	"The Feast of the Living and the Dead" "Das Fest der Lebenden und der Toten"	1982	100 minutes	24 October 1984

=== Die zweite Heimat (Leaving Home) ===
Die zweite Heimat (literally "The Second Heimat"; English title Heimat 2) (subtitled Chronik einer Jugend — Chronicle of a Youth) followed in 1992. It is set during the socially turbulent years of the 1960s and depicts how Maria's youngest son Hermann leaves his rural home and makes a new life for himself as a composer in Munich.

Hermann is a musical prodigy whose teenage romance in 1955 with 26-year-old soul-mate Klärchen was considered scandalous by his conservative home village. It resulted in her being expelled and coerced to never contact him again. Hermann felt crushed, vowing never to love again and to leave his village forever. He arrives in Munich at age 19 where he befriends fellow students, and meets future love interest Clarissa. Hermann joins the avant-garde culture surrounding the conservatory, which includes film students, while he also takes odd jobs. Hermann and his friends are gradually drawn to the Foxhole, a mansion headed by a wealthy art patroness said to be a "collector of artists". A remaster of "Die Zweite Heimat" was released in 2022.

Die Zweite Heimat episodes
No.	Title	Setting	Featured character	Runtime	Release date
1	"The Time of the First Songs" "Die Zeit der ersten Lieder"	1960	Hermann	116 minutes	4 March 1993
2	"Two Strange Eyes" "Zwei fremde Augen"	1960–61	Juan	115 minutes	7 March 1993
3	"Jealousy and Pride" "Eifersucht und Stolz"	1961	Evelyne	116 minutes	11 March 1993
4	"Ansgar's Death" "Ansgars Tod"	1961–62	Ansgar	100 minutes	14 March 1993
5	"The Game with Freedom" "Das Spiel mit der Freiheit"	1962	Helga	120 minutes	18 March 1993
6	"Kennedy's Children" "Kennedys Kinder"	1963	Alex	109 minutes	21 March 1993
7	"Christmas Wolves" "Weihnachtswölfe"	1963	Clarissa	110 minutes	25 March 1993
8	"The Wedding" "Die Hochzeit"	1964	Schnüsschen	120 minutes	28 March 1993
9	"The Eternal Daughter" "Die ewige Tochter"	1965	Fräulein Cerphal	118 minutes	1 April 1993
10	"The End of the Future" "Das Ende der Zukunft"	1966	Reinhard	131 minutes	4 April 1993
11	"The Time of Silence" "Die Zeit des Schweigens"	1967–68	Rob	118 minutes	8 April 1993
12	"The Time of Many Words" "Die Zeit der vielen Worte"	1968–69	Stefan	119 minutes	11 April 1993
13	"Art or Life" "Kunst oder Leben"	1970	Hermann & Clarissa	119 minutes	11 April 1993

=== Heimat 3 ===
Heimat 3 (subtitled Chronik einer Zeitenwende — Chronicle of a Changing Time) premiered in 2004. It continues Hermann's story in 1989 as he returns to Schabbach and depicts the events of the period from the fall of the Berlin Wall until 2000. The cinema version consists of six episodes running to 11 hours 29 minutes, although controversially the version broadcast on the German ARD television network in December 2004 was edited into six 90-minute episodes and it is this 20% shorter version which was released on DVD.

Heimat 3 episodes
No.	Title	Setting	Runtime	Release date
1	"The Happiest People in the World" "Das glücklichste Volk der Welt"	1989	106 minutes	15 December 2004
2	"The World Champions" "Die Weltmeister"	1990	100 minutes	17 December 2004
3	"The Russians are Coming" "Die Russen kommen"	1992–93	124 minutes	20 December 2004
4	"Everyone's Doing Well" "Allen geht's gut"	1995	132 minutes	22 December 2004
5	"The Heirs" "Die Erben"	1997	103 minutes	27 December 2004
6	"Farewell to Schabbach" "Abschied von Schabbach"	1999–2000	105 minutes	29 December 2004

=== Heimat-Fragmente (Heimat Fragments) ===
Heimat-Fragmente (English title Heimat Fragments), subtitled Die Frauen — The Women, was released in cinemas in 2006 and focuses on the women of the Simon family at the turn of the millennium, and in the 1960s. It uses deleted scenes and outtakes from the previous films, along with newly filmed material to create a narrative that mostly focuses on Lulu looking back on her family history.

=== Die andere Heimat (Home from Home) ===
In April 2012, Reitz started filming a prequel to the series: Die andere Heimat (literally "The other Heimat"; English title Home from Home), with the subtitle Chronik einer Sehnsucht — Chronicle of a Vision. The film takes place between 1840 and 1844 and centres around two brothers, their families and love relations from the Hunsrück area and their decision whether to flee hunger and poverty by emigrating to Brazil. Principal filming was completed in August 2012. It was screened at the Venice Film Festival in September 2013. The film was awarded a score of 70 on critical aggregator website Metacritic, indicating generally favorable reviews.

== Cast ==
=== Heimat ===
- Marita Breuer as Maria Simon (née Wiegand) (7 August 1900 – 18 September 1982).
- Michael Lesch (episodes 1&2) and Dieter Schaad (episodes 8, 10&11) as Paul Simon (1898–1984)
- Karin Kienzler (episodes 1&2) and Eva Maria Bayerwaltes (episodes 3–8) as Pauline Kröber (née Simon) (1904–75)
- Rüdiger Weigang as Eduard Simon (1897–1967). Has issues with his lung so did not go to war.
- Gertrud Bredel as Katharina Simon (née Schirmer) (10 November 1875 – 10 May 1947)
- Willi Berger as Mathias Simon (11 June 1872 – 23 January 1945)
- Johannes Lobewein as Alois Wiegand (1870–1965). Mayor of the village and Maria's father. Supporter of the Nazi's rise.
- Kurt Wagner as Glasisch-Karl (1900–1982)
- Eva Maria Schneider as Marie-Goot (1882–1960)
- Alexander Scholz as Hänschen Betz (c.1908 – 15 January 1944)
- Arno Lang as Robert Kröber (1902–1944)
- Karin Rasenack as Lucie Simon (née Hardtke) (1906–1978)
- Jörg Hube as Otto Wohlleben. Hermann's father.
- Gudrun Landgrebe as Klärchen Sisse (c. 1929– )

=== Die Zweite Heimat ===
- Henry Arnold as Hermann Simon (29 May 1940– ). He left home 2 September 1960 after vowing to never love again. Falls in love with Clarissa.
- Salome Kammer as Clarissa Lichtblau (c.1940– ). Plays the cello obsessively. Has a relationship with Volker and briefly Juan. Falls in love with Hermann and later connect in the third Heimat film.
- Anke Sevenich as Waltraud 'Schnüsschen' Schneider (c.1940– ). A childhood friend of Hermann who he eventually marries.
- Noemi Steuer as Helga Aufschrey (June, 1939– ). A troubled student who falls in love with Hermann. Has a difficult life.
- Daniel Smith as Juan Subercasseaux (c.1940– ). Is from Chile and speaks eleven languages. Ends up being looked after by Elizabeth Cerphal.
- Gisela Müller as Evelyne Cerphal (July 1942– ). Seeks out her real mother after discovering her mother growing up was not her biological one. Has help from Ansgar and Frau Ries.
- Michael Seyfried as Ansgar Herzsprung (1938–1962). Studied medicine.
- Michael Schönborn as Alex (c.1935– ). Philosophy student.
- László I. Kish as Reinhard Dörr. Film student.
- Peter Weiss as Rob Stürmer. Film student.
- Frank Röth as Stefan Aufhauser. Law student.
- Lena Lessing as Olga Müller. Aspiring actress. Has relationships with Ansgar and Reinhard.
- Armin Fuchs as Volker Schimmelpfennig. A senior music student.
- Martin Maria Blau as Jean-Marie Weber (1939– ) When a child, he lived in Narbonne, south of France and went to boarding school in France and Switzerland.
- Franziska Traub as Renate Leineweber (c.1942– ). Was a law student but after meeting Hermann follows her dreams of being a performer.
- Hannelore Hoger as Elizabeth Cerphal (1911– ). Evelyne's aunt and older sister Arno, Evelyne's father (8 August 1919) who died in 1941.
- Manfred Andrae as Gerold Gattinger. Lives with Elizabeth and looks after her finances.
- Hanna Köhler as Frau Moretti. Originally allows Hermann to stay in her spare room. She becomes an admirer of him.
- Fred Stillkrauth as Kohlen-Josef. Owner of coal yard where Hermann and Clemens live in the early episodes.
- Alfred Edel as Herr Edel (c.1910–1961). A man who tells all the young students about Munich's history and famous philosophers and artists.
- Veronica Ferres as Dorli. A friend of Helga.
- Irene Kugler as Marianne Westphal (1929– ). A friend of Helga who seduces Hermann in the fifth episode.
- Daniel Much as Tommy (c.1950). Hermann teaches him piano in the fifth episode.
- Eva Maria Schneider as Marie-Goot. Hermann's great aunt.
- Eva Maria Bayerwaltes as Pauline Kröber. Hermann's step aunt.
- Kurt Wagner as Glasisch Karl. Appears in cameo at end of thirteenth part.

== Characters ==
=== Simon family ===
- Matthias Simon (11 June 1872 – 23 January 1945), a blacksmith married to Katharina Schirmer (1875–1947). They are parents of Eduard, Pauline, and Paul.
  - Eduard Simon (1897–1967), mayor of Rhaunen who was convinced early in life that there was gold in the Hunsrück streams. He always had trouble with his lungs; during treatment in Berlin, he met and later married Lucie Hardtke (1906–1978), a brothel madam who embraced life in the Hunsrück. They had a child, Horst Simon (1934–1948), who was killed at an early age, after discovering a landmine in the forest.
  - Paul Simon (1898–1984), owner of Simon Electric. He married Maria Wiegand in 1922 and fathered Anton and Ernst (see Maria Wiegand below). After returning from fighting in World War I, Paul felt claustrophobic in Hunsrück society and ran away to the U.S. in 1928 to start Simon Electric in Detroit, Michigan. He returned in 1945 and visited until 1947. He left again the day of his mother's funeral.
  - Pauline Simon (1904–1975), assistant jewelry shop owner. Married watchmaker Robert Kröber (1897–1944). Both became modestly wealthy during the 1930s. Parents of Gabi (1935– ) and Robert (1937– ).

=== Wiegand family ===
- Alois Wiegand (1870–1965), mayor of Schabbach who married Martha Wiegand (1878–1945). Parents of Gustav, Wilfried and Maria. Alois was an abrasive wealthy man who embraced status symbols, and later became a Nazi supporter. With his SS son Wilfried he oversaw the village's allegiance to Hitler during World War II.
  - Gustav Wiegand (1897–1917), died as a World War I soldier. Not married; no children.
  - Wilfried Wiegand (1915–1972), member of the SS during the war. He executed a downed British pilot under false pretenses. At a Schabbach party he revealed that Jews were being sent "up the chimney" and in the vein of Himmler lamented how his SS comrades suffered from this unpleasant task. He became a farmer after the war and was also a member of the Christian Democratic Union. Did not marry and had no children.
  - Maria Wiegand Simon (7 August 1900 – 18 September 1982), matriarch of the family after World War II. Married Paul Simon and gave birth to Anton and Ernst. Gave birth in 1940 to Hermann, with Otto Wohlleben (1902–1944), a half-Jewish engineer who came to work on a new highway before the outbreak of war, and was killed defusing a bomb.
    - Anton Simon (1923–1995), owner of Simon Optical factory. Married to Martha Hanke (1924–1987). Had numerous children born 1945–1953: Marlies, Hartmut, Dieter, Helga, and Gisela. Anton worked for a German Army propaganda unit during World War II and served on the Eastern Front. There is one scene showing him filming single executions – these are almost certainly partisans given that the time is 1943 (and widespread executions in the field had ceased on the orders of Himmler) and also the fact that the machine gun crew carrying out the executions are German Army regulars and not Einsatzgruppen. After the German defeat and subsequent imprisonment in a Russian labor camp, Anton walked home to Germany in the late 1940s. He arrived 10 May 1947, after walking five-thousand kilometres. He founded Simon Optical with investment from father Paul.
    - Ernst Simon (1924–1997), German Air Force pilot and construction business owner. He had an early aptitude for flying. After the war he attempted unsuccessfully to operate a helicopter business. In the 1960s he started a thriving home-renovation business which destroyed the village's traditional architecture.
    - Hermann Simon (1940– ), conductor and composer. At age 15 he was in love with Klärchen Sisse, 26, who left the area after their affair was discovered. Moved away from the Hunsrück at age 18 to study music in Munich.

=== Schirmer family ===
- Katharina Schirmer (10 November 1875 – 10 May 1947), matriarch of the family before World War II. Married to Matthias Simon (see Matthias Simon above).
- Marie-Goot Schirmer (1882–1960), sister of Katharina Simon, married to Mäthes-Pat (1869–1949). Marie-Goot was characterized as a gossipy neighbor.
  - Karl Glasisch (1900–1982), son of Marie-Goot. Mäthes-Pat is not his father. Throughout the film he was Schabbach's friendly, good-natured drunk, dissociated from village life but seeing all. He served as the story narrator.
- Hans Schirmer (20 April 1873 – 1943), lived in Bochum. Father of Fritz and brother of Katharina. Was remembered for having the same birthday as Hitler.
  - Fritz Schirmer (1903–1937), young Communist sympathizer who lived in Bochum. Married Alice (1902–1945). Parents of Lotti and Ursel. Fritz was sent to a concentration camp, but he was later released on condition he stayed out of any political activity.
    - Lotti Schirmer (1923– ), chief secretary of Simon Optical. Came from Bochum with Katherina after her father was arrested. After World War II she was a carefree single girl, a friend of Klärchen Sisse, and in later life she married Sepp Vilsmeier (1920– ). Adopted Vietnamese children Hoa (1973– ) and Hou (1975– ).
    - Ursel Schirmer (1936–1945). Died during an air raid.
  - Walter Schirmer (1899–1943), of Bochum, married Lilli (1901–1969). No children.

=== Other characters ===
- Klärchen Sisse (1929– ), worked at Simon Optik and was a friend of Lotti Schirmer. She enters the story in 1945, as a 16-yr-old refugee from elsewhere in Germany who has been advised by Ernst to go his mother's house in Schabbach, where she will be 'looked after'. Just as he says, Klärchen is accepted into the Simon household and effectively treated as one of the family, eventually gaining a position with Simon Optik. A 1956 love affair with Hermann Simon, who is 11 years her junior, results in her becoming pregnant, leaving the village and having an abortion.
- Apollonia (c.1900–?), brief love interest for Paul Simon c. 1920. Was ostracized in Schabbach for her dark complexion. Had a child by a Frenchman and moved to France, never to be seen again.
- Martina (c.1910 – 1945), a prostitute from Berlin and friend of Lucie Hardtke who attempted to bring her trade to the Hunsrück. Was in love with Pollak (1910–1945), both died in Berlin.
- Hänschen Betz (c.1908 – 15 January 1944), son of the Schabbach basketmaker, had an injured eye from childhood. With the encouragement of soldiers he became a sharpshooter. Died on the Russian Front during World War II, for which Eduard felt some responsibility having encouraged Hänschen's shooting practice when young.
- Fritz Pieritz (c.1902–?), good-natured assistant to Otto Wohlleben, later worked for Anton Simon at Simon Optik.
- Denise de Gallimasch (c.1900–?), a French horse rider of debatable nobility en route from Paris to Berlin.

== Reception ==
=== Release and awards ===
After premiering in Germany, Heimat was shown in Venice, London and New York festivals. It was shown in movie screens around the world in separate parts. However, it gained its worldwide exposure on television, across 26 countries. In order to shape the film into eleven episodes, Reitz devised introductory segments in which Kurt Wagner as Glasisch narrated the brief story so far, over photographs by Eduard Simon. In Germany, the broadcast received over fifteen million viewers.

Heimat earned Edgar Reitz the FIPRESCI Prize at the 1984 Venice Film Festival, while Marita Breuer won the Darstellerpreis for Best Actress at the 1985 Bavarian Film Awards. In the United Kingdom the film won a BAFTA and the London Film Critics' Circle award for Best Foreign Language Film.

Die Zweite Heimat premiered at the Venice Biennale and broadcast rights were purchased by television companies in 16 different countries. However, the German backers were disappointed that it received a smaller percentage-viewing share than the first. Reitz said the executives overlooked the fact that in 1984 only three channels existed compared to more than twenty in 1992. In the United States the film had a short theatrical run in New York at The Public Theater. It also screened at the Museum of Fine Arts, Boston and various Goethe-Institut locations across the country. It was not picked up for television by US cable networks.

In Italy the film was shown at a large venue in Rome, that had sold out tickets weekly. Reitz was presented with the Eurofipa d’honneur award at the Cannes Film Festival in 1994.

Die Zweite Heimat had a weekend premiere for its first five episodes in Munich, on the weekend of 17 - 18 September. An essay was written about the weekend on a Heimat fanpage. Episodes six to thirteen followed for the following eight weeks. A Blu-Ray of the remastered film was released in November 2022

=== Critical reception ===
Heimat received acclaim around the world. Many were enthusiastic how it never felt like a television movie, but a cinematic experience. Many praised the themes through the film about leaving and returning and simply how we connect to the larger world from our home. Reitz received thousands of letters from ordinary people, thanking him for retrieving and unlocking their memories of the 1919–1982 period. However, critic Leonie Naughton accused the film of presenting a "bourgeois history of the Third Reich, a homespun tale of innocence."

Die Zweite Heimat received a lukewarm reception in the United States. National press coverage was limited to a single review by Stephen Holden in The New York Times, who described Hermann Simon as "a hotheaded romantic" and the film as a "alternately gripping and lyrical 13-episode serial about German life in the 1960s". Holden also declared the film to be "the ultimate highbrow soap opera for couch potatoes".

British press for Die Zweite Heimat was more enthusiastic with The Financial Times, The Observer and The Independent all praising it.

=== Legacy ===
Heimat was one of director Stanley Kubrick's favourite films. It is ranked No. 59 in Empire magazine's "The 100 Best Films Of World Cinema" in 2010. It also finished in 6th place when BBC Two ran a 40th birthday poll celebrating the station's greatest programmes and was 10th in Channel 4's 50 Greatest TV Dramas.

Heimat has faced some criticism for its selective interpretation of German history, with some writers noting that there is limited treatment of the hyperinflationary spiral of the 1920s, the Great Depression, or certain aspects of Nazi history such as the Holocaust of World War II. In 1985, Timothy Garton Ash wrote in The New York Review of Books that:

When you show the 1930s as a golden age of prosperity and excitement in the German countryside, when you are shown the Germans as victims of the war, then you inevitably find yourself asking: But what about the other side? What about Auschwitz? Where is the director's moral judgment? To which the colour filters insistently reply: 'Remember, remember, this is a film about what Germans remember. Some things they remember in full colour. Some in sepia. Others they prefer to forget. Memory is selective. Memory is partial. Memory is amoral.'

Heimat 's themes of decadent American values and Western corporate greed rising up against the innocent simplicity of the Hunsrück have been seen as "resurrecting a discourse that prevailed in the nineteenth century about the modernization of Germany's society and economy ... no compromises or delicate balances are possible".

Barbara Gabriel argued that the series was part of a larger movement of national memory work in Germany, provoked in part by the American television series Holocaust. As European art in general and German art in particular underwent a resurgence in the 1960s, artists like Günter Grass and Edgar Reitz captured international attention as they grappled with issues of identity in a divided, post-Holocaust Germany.

== See also ==
- The Village, a 2013 TV series set in England and inspired by the series.
