= Turks in Germany =

Ethnic group

Almanya'daki Türkler (Turkish); Deutschtürken (German)

Total population
- 1.4 million with Turkish citizenship (Eurostat 2025 estimation) 3,081,000 with a migration background from Turkey (including other ethnic groups from Turkey) (Destatis 2025 estimation)

Regions with significant populations
- North Rhine-Westphalia; Stuttgart; Munich; Berlin; Frankfurt; Hanover; Nuremberg; Hamburg; Mainz; Mannheim

Languages
- Turkish, German

Religion
- Predominantly Sunni Islam; Minority Alevism, irreligion, Christianity and other religions

Turks in Germany, also referred to as German Turks and Turkish Germans (German: Türken in Deutschland or Deutschtürken; Turkish: Almanya'daki Türkler, also known as Gurbetçiler or Almancılar), are ethnic Turkish people living in Germany. These terms are also used to refer to German-born individuals who are of full or partial Turkish ancestry.

However, not all people in Germany who trace their heritage back to Turkey are ethnic Turks. A significant proportion of the population is also of Kurdish, Circassian, Azerbaijani descent and to a lesser extent, of Christian descent, such as Assyrian, and Armenian. Also some ethnic Turkish communities in Germany trace their ancestry to other parts of southeastern Europe or the Levant (such as Balkan Turks and Turkish Cypriots). At present, ethnic Turkish people form the largest ethnic minority in Germany. They also form the largest Turkish population in the Turkish diaspora.

Most people of Turkish descent in Germany trace their ancestry to the Gastarbeiter (guest worker) programs in the 1960s and 1970s. In 1961, in the midst of an economic boom that resulted in a significant labor shortage, Germany signed a bilateral agreement with Turkey to allow German companies to recruit Turkish workers. The agreement was in place for 12 years, during which around 650,000 workers came from Turkey to Germany. Many also brought their spouses and children with them.

Turks who immigrated to Germany brought cultural elements with them, including the Turkish language and Turkish food.

== History ==
=== Turkish migration from the Seljuk Empire and the Rum Seljuk Sultanate ===
During a series of invading Crusades by European-Christian armies into lands ruled by Turkic rulers in the Middle East, namely under the Seljuk Turks in the Seljuk Empire and the Rum Seljuk Sultanate (but also the Bahri Mamluk Sultanate), many crusaders brought back Turkish male and female prisoners of war to Europe; women were generally baptised and then married whilst "every returning baron and count had [male] prisoners of war in his entourage." Some of the Beutetürken ('booty Turks') taken to Germany during the Crusades also included children and young adults.

The earliest documented Turk in Germany is believed to be Sadok Seli Soltan (Mehmet Sadık Selim Sultan) (ca.1270-1328) from the Anatolian Seljuk lands. According to Streiders Hessisches Gelehrtenlexikon, Soltan was a Turkish officer who was captured by Count von Lechtomir (Reinhart von Württemberg) during his return to Germany from the Holy Land in 1291. By 1304 Soltan married Rebekka Dohlerin; he was baptised the following year as "Johann Soldan", but "out of special love to him", the Count "gave him a Turkish nobility coat of arms". Soldan and his wife had at least three sons, including Eberhardus, Christanianus and Melchior. Another source specifies that Soltan came with Count Reinhart von Württemberg to the residential town of Brackenheim in 1304 and was then baptised in 1305 at S. Johannis Church as "Johannes Soldan". There is also evidence that Soltan had a total of 12 sons born in 20 years with Anna Delcherin and Rebecca Bergmännin; eight of his sons passed to the clergy and do not appear in genealogy records due to compulsory celibacy associated with the clergy.

For example, through his maternal grandmother, the renowned German poet and writer Johann Wolfgang von Goethe belonged to the descendants of the Soldan family and thus had Turkish ancestry. Bernt Engelmann has said that "the German poet prince [i.e. Goethe] with oriental ancestors is by no means a rare exception." Indeed, other descendants of the first recorded Turk in Germany include the lawyer Hans Soldan; the city architects and wine masters Heinrich Soldan and his son Johann Soldan who both served as Mayor of Frankenberg; the sculptor and artist Philipp Soldan; and the pharmacist Carl Soldan who founded the confectionery company "Dr. C. Soldan". Carl Soldan's grandson, Pery Soldan, has said that the family continue to use the crescent and star on their coat of arms. According to Latif Çelik, as of 2008, the Soldan family numbered 2,500 and are also found in Austria, Finland, France and Switzerland.

=== Turkish migration from the Ottoman Empire ===
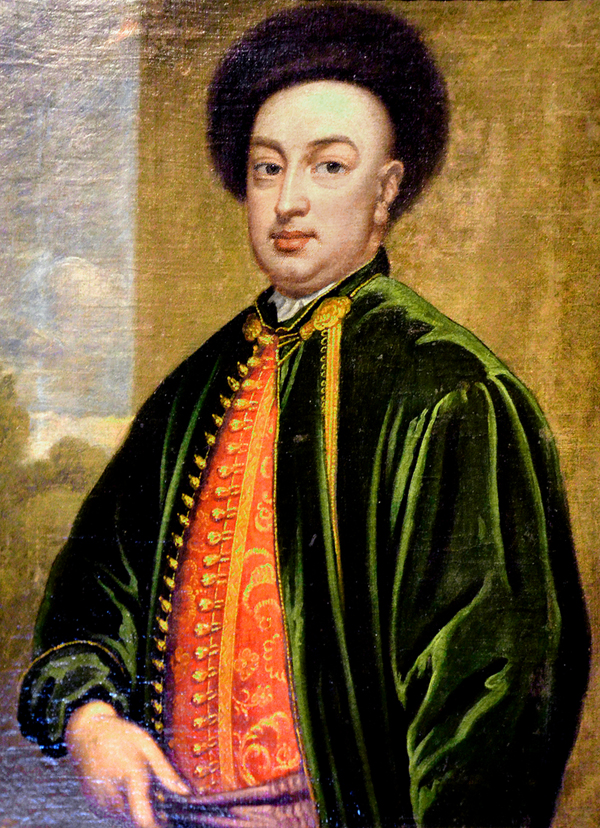
Once the Ottoman army retreated from their unsuccessful campaign at the Battle of Vienna in 1683, at least 500 Turkish prisoners were forcibly settled in Germany. Captured several years later, in 1685, Ludwig Maximilian Mehmet von Königstreu (pictured) is one of the most notable Beutetürken ("booty Turks") who later entered the court of the Elector of Hanover and converted to Christianity.

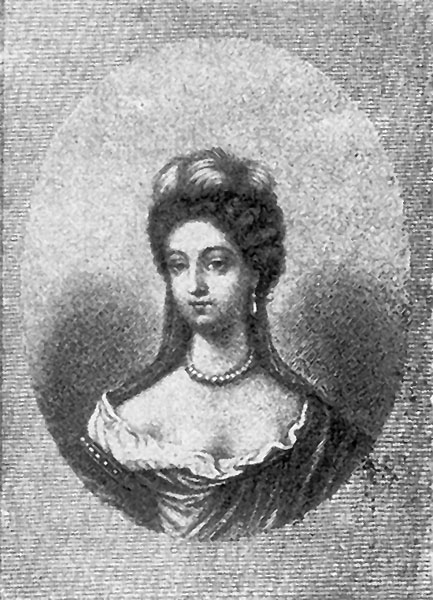
Fatima Kariman was a Turkish captive during the Battle of Buda (1686). She was captured by General Schöning and later sent to Saxony where she became the mistress of Augustus II the Strong.

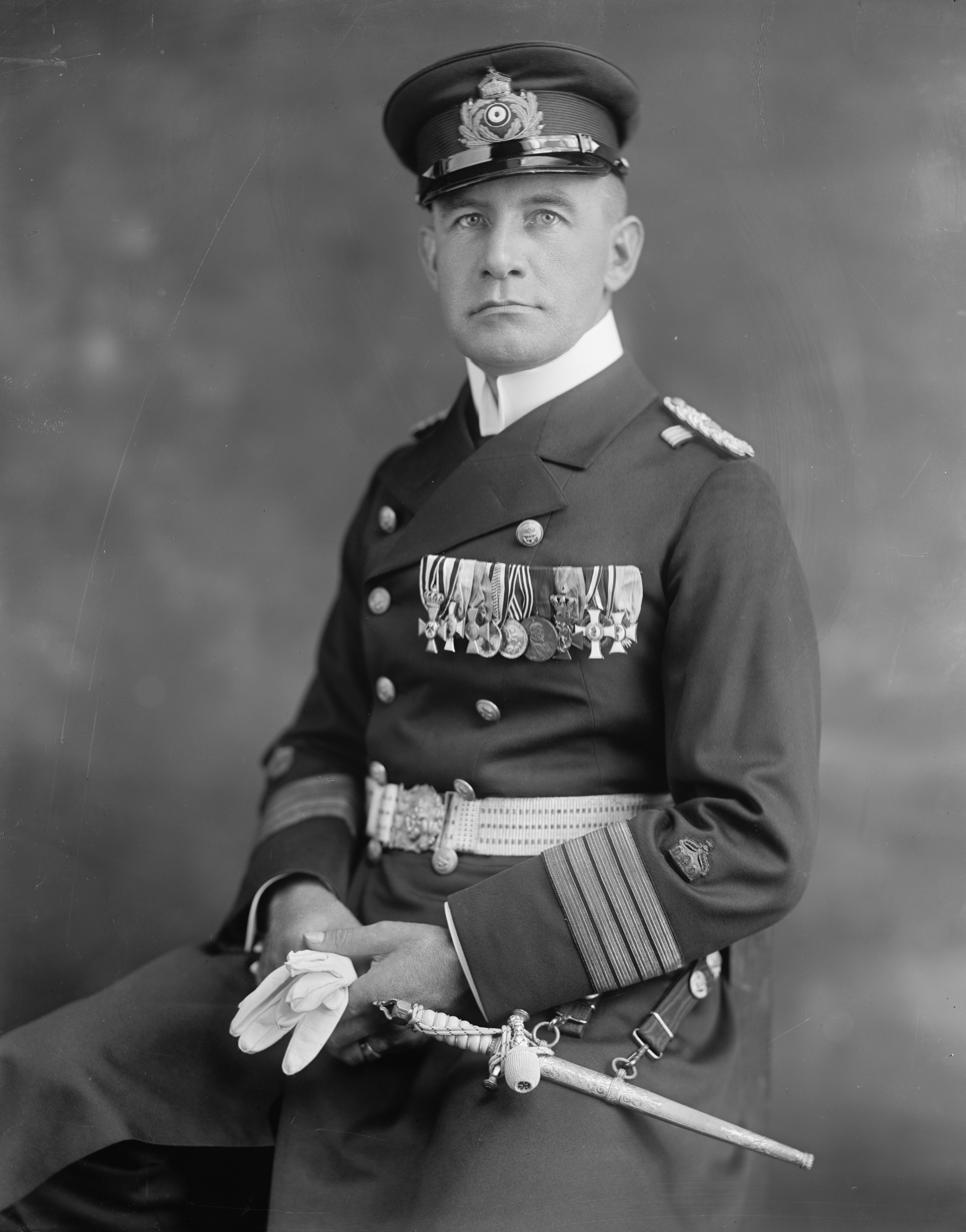
Born to a Turkish father and a German mother, Karl Boy-Ed was the naval attaché to the German embassy in Washington during World War I.

The Turkish people had greater contact with the German states by the sixteenth century when the Ottoman Empire attempted to expand their territories beyond the north Balkan territories. The Ottoman Turks held two sieges in Vienna: the first Siege of Vienna in 1529 and the Second Siege of Vienna in 1683. The aftermath of the second siege provided the circumstances for a Turkish community to permanently settle in Germany.

Many Ottoman soldiers and camp followers who were left behind after the second siege of Vienna became stragglers or prisoners. It is estimated that at least 500 Turkish prisoners were forcibly settled in Germany. Historical records show that some Turks became traders or took up other professions, particularly in southern Germany. Some Turks fared very well in Germany; for example, one Ottoman Turk is recorded to have been raised to the Hanoverian nobility. Historical records also show that many Ottoman Turks converted to Christianity and became priests or pastors.

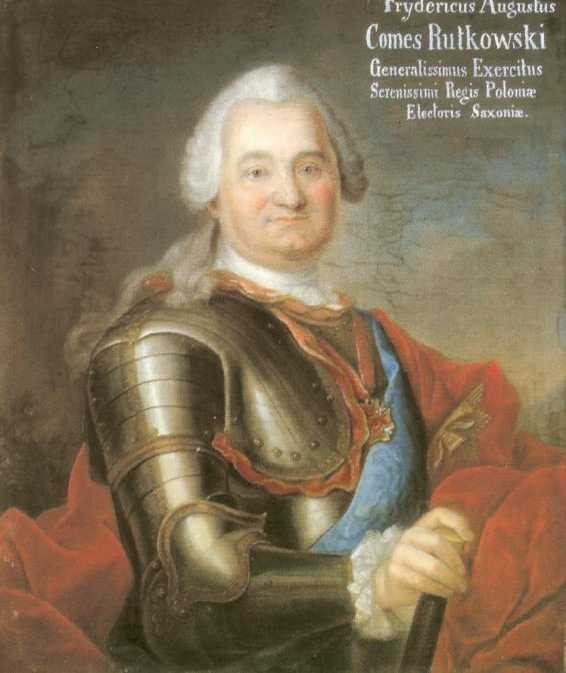
Of Turkish origin through his mother Fatima, Frederick Augustus Rutowsky became the commander of the Saxon army during the Siege of Pirna.

The aftermath of the second siege of Vienna also led to a series of wars between the Ottoman Empire and the Holy League, known as the "Great Turkish War", or the "War of the Holy League", which led to a series of Ottoman defeats. Consequently, more Turks were taken by the Europeans as prisoners. The Turkish captives taken to Germany were not solely made up of men. For example, General Schöning took "two of the most beautiful women in the world" in Buda who later converted to Christianity. Another Turkish captive named Fatima became the mistress of Augustus II the Strong, Elector of Saxony of the Albertine line of the House of Wettin. Fatima and Augustus had two children: their son, Frederick Augustus Rutowsky, became the commander of the Saxon army in 1754-63 whilst their daughter, Maria Anna Katharina Rutowska, married into Polish nobility. Records show that at this point it was not uncommon for Turks in Germany to convert to Christianity. For example, records show that 28 Turks converted to Christianity and were settled in Württemberg.

With the establishment of the Kingdom of Prussia in 1701, Turkish people continued to enter the German lands as soldiers employed by the Prussian kings. Historical records show that this was particularly evident with the expansion of Prussia in the mid-18th century. For example, in 1731, the Duke of Kurland presented twenty Turkish guardsmen to King Frederick William I, and at one time, about 1,000 Muslim soldiers are said to have served in the Prussian cavalry. The Prussian king's fascination with the Enlightenment was reflected in their consideration for the religious concerns of their Muslim troops. By 1740 Frederick the Great stated that:

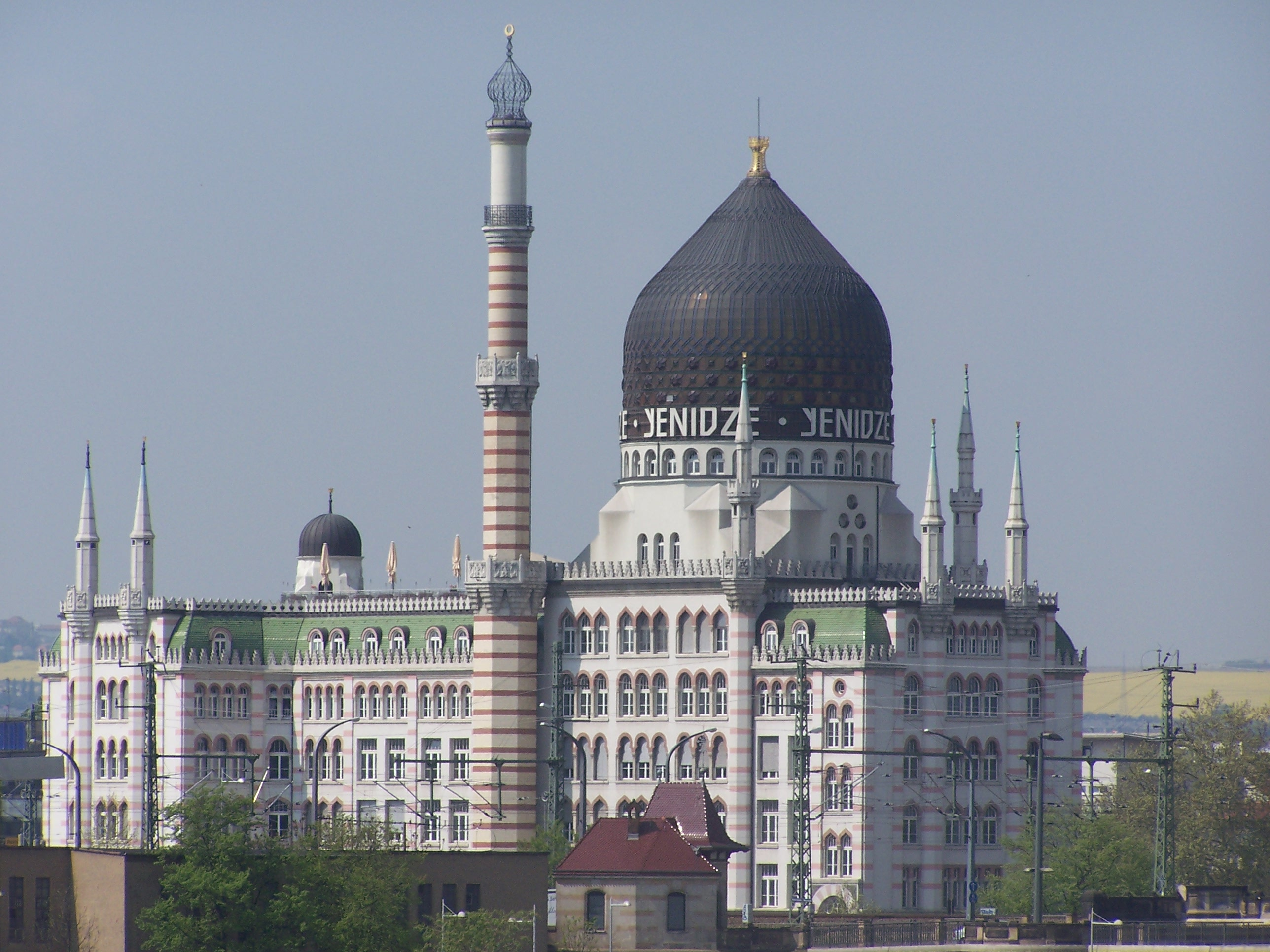
The mosque-style Yenidze tobacco factory in Dresden is a symbolic reminder of the trading relations between the Ottomans and the Prussians. It was named after the importing tobacco region of Ottoman Yenidze.

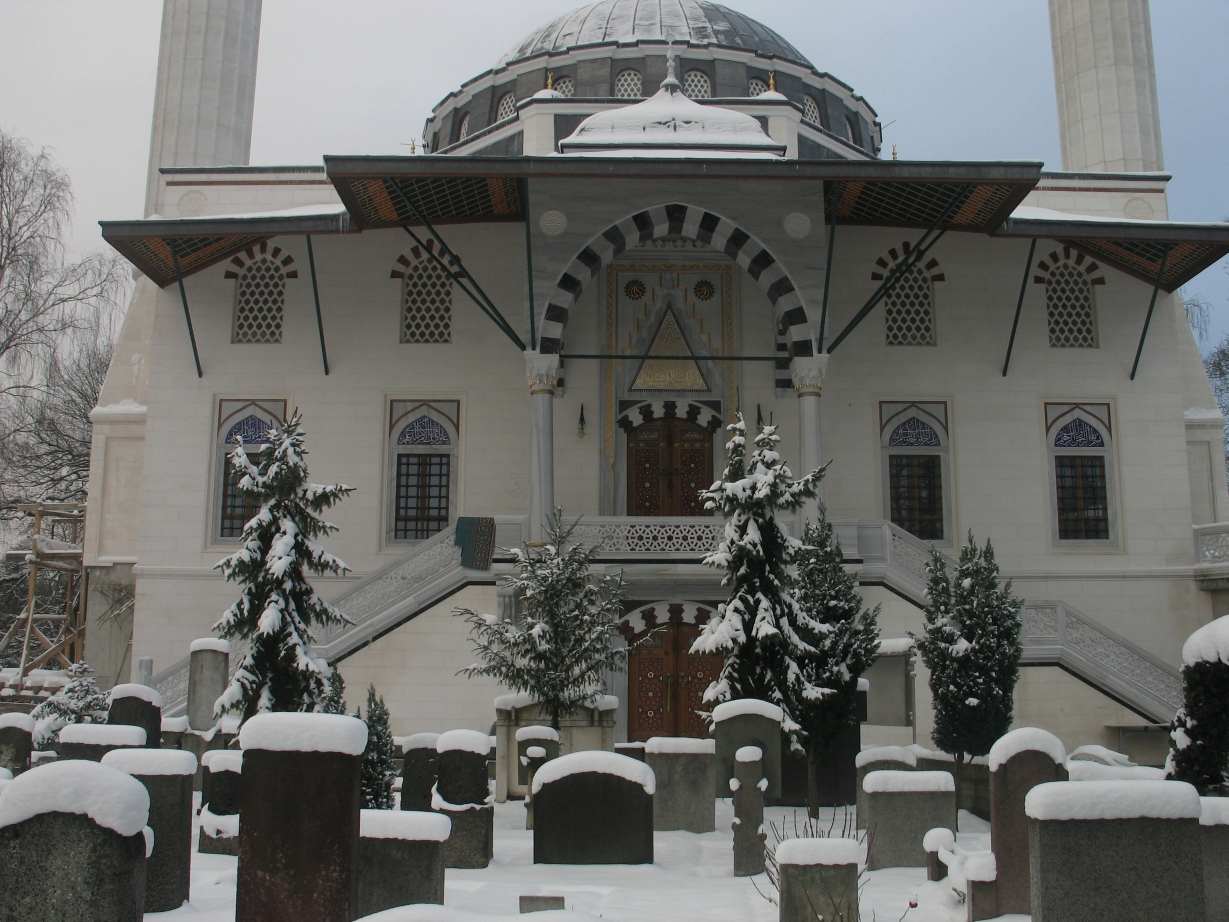
Berlin's Turkish cemetery alongside the Şehitlik Mosque, a classic Ottoman style mosque.

"All religions are just as good as each other, as long as the people who practice them are honest, and even if Turks and heathens came and wanted to populate this country, then we would build mosques and temples for them."

By 1763, an Ottoman legation existed at the Prussian court in Berlin. Its third envoy, Ali Aziz Efendi, died in 1798 which led to the establishment of the first Muslim cemetery in Germany. However, several decades later, there was a need for another cemetery, as well as a mosque, and the Ottoman sultan Abdulaziz was given permission to patronize a mosque in Berlin in 1866.

Once trading treaties were established between the Ottomans and the Prussians in the nineteenth century, Turks and Germans were encouraged to cross over to each other's lands for trade. Consequently, the Turkish community in Germany, and particularly in Berlin, grew significantly (as did a German community in Istanbul) in the years before the First World War. These contacts influenced the building of various Turkish-style structures in Germany, such as the Yenidze cigarette factory in Dresden and the Dampfmaschinenhaus für Sanssouci pumping-station in Potsdam.

During this time, there were also marriages between Germans and Turks. For example, Karl Boy-Ed, who was the naval attaché to the German embassy in Washington during World War I, was born into a German-Turkish family.

== Turkish migration from the Republic of Turkey ==
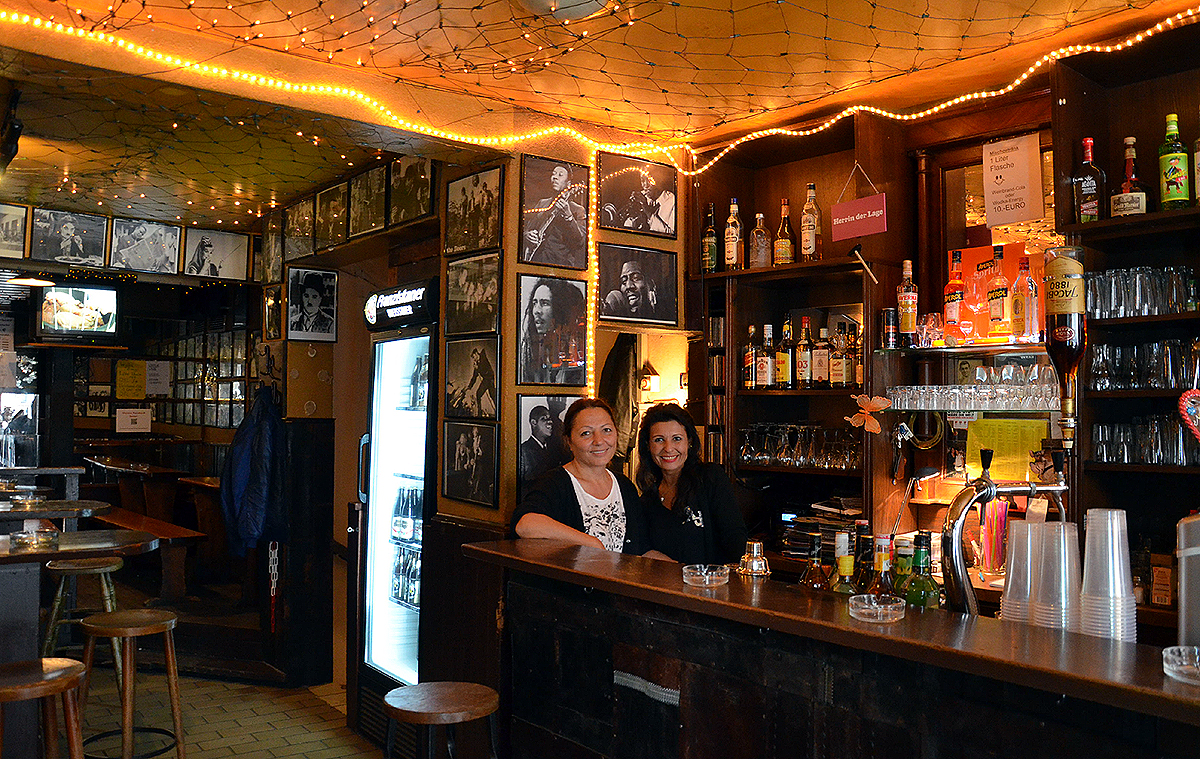
Turkish employees in the Barfuß Bar in Hannover.

=== Heuss-Turks ===
The Heuss Turks were the name given to around 150 young Turkish citizens who came to Germany in 1958. They followed an invitation that the then Federal President Theodor Heuss had extended to Turkish vocational school graduates during a visit to Turkey in Ankara in 1957. The exchange, which was intended as a vocational training measure and began for some of the group as apprentices at the Ford plant in Cologne, became the starting point for their immigration to the Federal Republic for some. A number worked at Ford until they retired in the late 1980s/early 1990s. It was the first large group of Turkish workers to come to Germany together, even before the start of actual Turkish immigration with the recruitment agreement between the Federal Republic of Germany and Turkey in 1961. According to DOMiD reports, they were given a warm welcome in Germany and were extremely popular with their work colleagues.

=== Turkish Student Federation in Germany ===
The Turkish Student Federation in Germany (ATÖF; Turkish: Almanya Türk Öğrenci Federasyonu) is a nationwide interest group for Turkish students in Germany founded in 1962, which was dissolved in 1977. The first regional German-Turkish student association after the Second World War was founded in Munich in 1954. In the following years, others were founded, including in Berlin and Karlsruhe in 1957. The ATÖF was founded in 1962 as a merger of nine such student associations. Its founding location was again Munich. In 1977, the ATÖF was dissolved due to internal problems.

In the 1950s, West Germany experienced an economic boom (Wirtschaftswunder, or 'economic miracle'), exacerbated by the construction of the Berlin Wall in 1961 that prevented migration from East Germany. In response, the West German government signed a labour recruitment agreement with Turkey on 30 October 1961 and officially invited Turkish workers to emigrate to the country, initially on visas limited to two years, although this was quickly lifted following complaints by German employers.

Most Turkish immigrants intended to live there temporarily and then return to Turkey so that they could build a new life with the money they had earned. Indeed, return-migration increased during the recession of 1966–1967 and the 1973 oil crisis. Under Helmut Kohl, the government also attempted to encourage immigrants to return to their countries of origin with financial incentives, although this was largely unsuccessful. Overall, the proportion of Turkish immigrants who returned to Turkey remained relatively small. This was partly due to the family reunification rights that were introduced in 1974 which allowed Turkish workers to bring their families to Germany. Consequently, between 1974 and 1988 the number of Turks in Germany nearly doubled, acquiring a balanced sex ratio and a much younger age profile than the German population. Once the recruitment of foreigner workers was reintroduced after the recession of 1967, the BfA (Bundesversicherungsanstalt für Angestellte) granted most work visas to women. This was in part because labour shortages continued in low paying, low-status service jobs such as electronics, textiles, and garment work; and in part to further the goal of family reunification.

The fall of the Berlin Wall in 1989, and the reunification of East and West Germany, was followed by intense public debate around national identity and citizenship, including the place of Germany's Turkish minority in the future of a united Germany. These debates about citizenship were accompanied by expressions of xenophobia and ethnic violence that targeted the Turkish population. Anti-immigrant sentiment was especially strong in the four former eastern states of Germany, which underwent profound social and economic transformations during the reunification process. Turkish communities experienced considerable fear for their safety throughout Germany, with some 1,500 reported cases of right wing violence, and 2,200 cases the year after. The political rhetoric calling for foreigner-free zones (Ausländer-freie Zonen) and the rise of neo-Nazi groups sharpened public awareness of integration issues and generated intensified support among liberal Germans for the competing idea of Germany as a "multicultural" society. Citizenship by birth was restricted to the children of German citizens until the mid-2000s. However, increasing numbers of second-generation Turkish-Germans have opted for German citizenship and are becoming more involved in the political process.

=== Turkish migration from the Balkans ===
==== Bulgaria ====
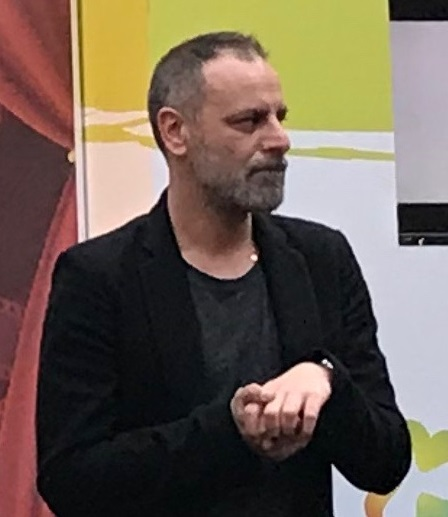
Born in Nuremberg, the actor Ozan Güven is the son of Bulgarian migrants of ethnic Turkish origin.

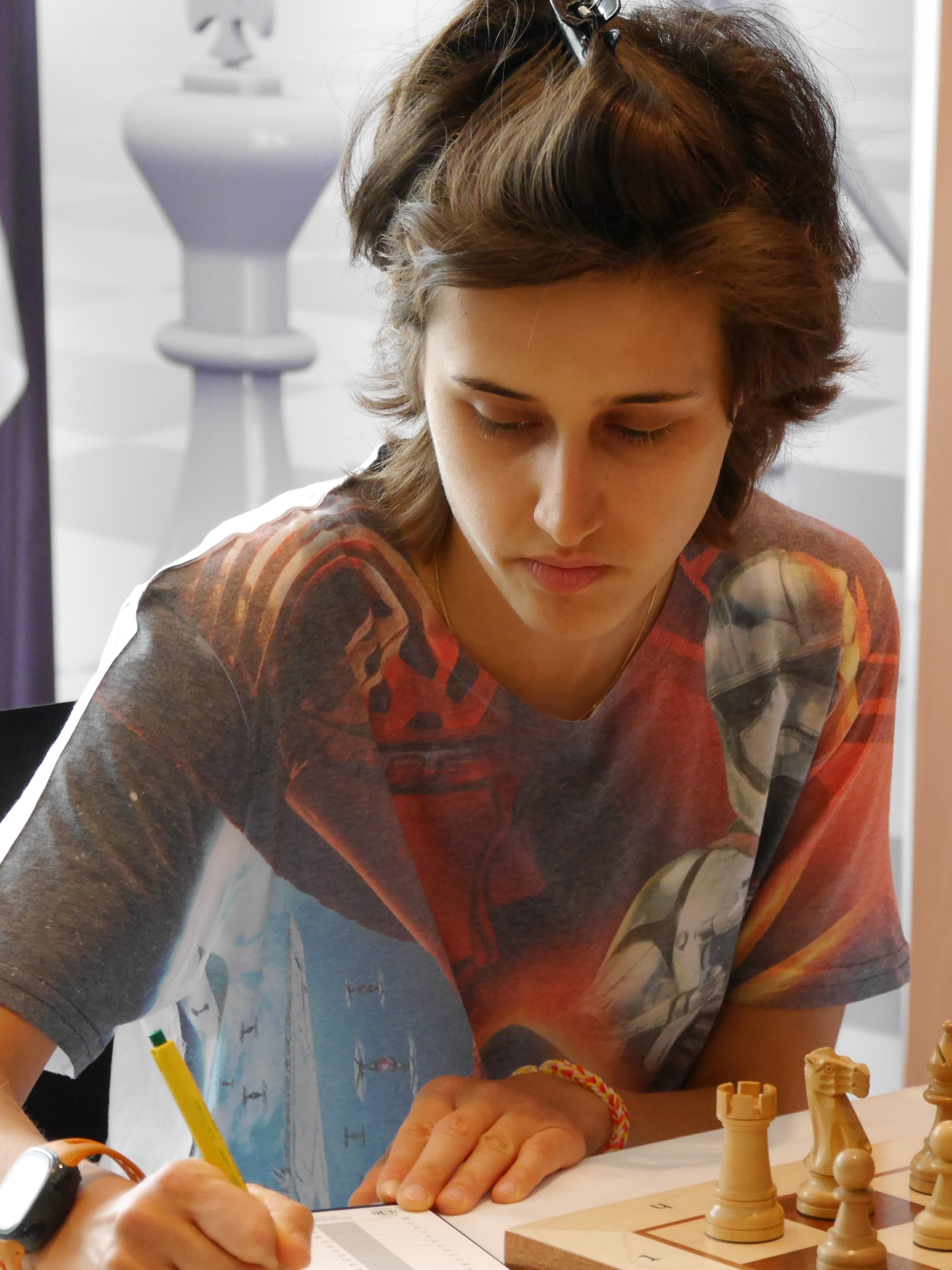
Filiz Osmanodja, who holds the title of Woman Grandmaster in chess, was born in Dresden to Turkish parents from Bulgaria.

Initially, Turkish Bulgarians arrived in Germany following the introduction of family reunification laws in 1974. They were able to take advantage of this law despite the very small number of Bulgarian citizens in Germany because some Turkish workers in Germany who arrived from Turkey were actually part of the Turkish minority who had left Bulgaria during the communist regime in the 1980s and still held Bulgarian citizenship, alongside their Turkish citizenship.

The migration of Turkish Bulgarians to Germany increased further once communism in Bulgaria ended in 1989. In particular, Turkish Bulgarians who did not join the massive migration wave to Turkey during the so-called "Revival Process" faced severe economic disadvantages and discrimination resulting from the state policies of Bulgarisation. Hence, from the early 1990s onwards many Bulgarian Turks sought asylum in Germany.

The number of Turkish-speaking Roma people from Bulgaria in Germany has significantly increased since Bulgaria was admitted into the European Union, which has allowed many Bulgarian Turkish Roma to use the freedom of movement to enter Germany. The Bulgarian Turkish Roma have generally been attracted to Germany because they rely on the well-established Turkish-German community for gaining employment.

Thus, the social network of the first waves of political emigration, as well as the preservation of kinship, has opened an opportunity for many Turkish Bulgarian to continue to migrate to Western Europe, with the majority continuing to settling in Germany. As a result, Turkish Roma from Bulgaria in Germany outnumber the large Turkish Roma Bulgarian diasporas in countries such as the Netherlands, where they make up about 80% of Bulgarian citizens.

==== Greece ====
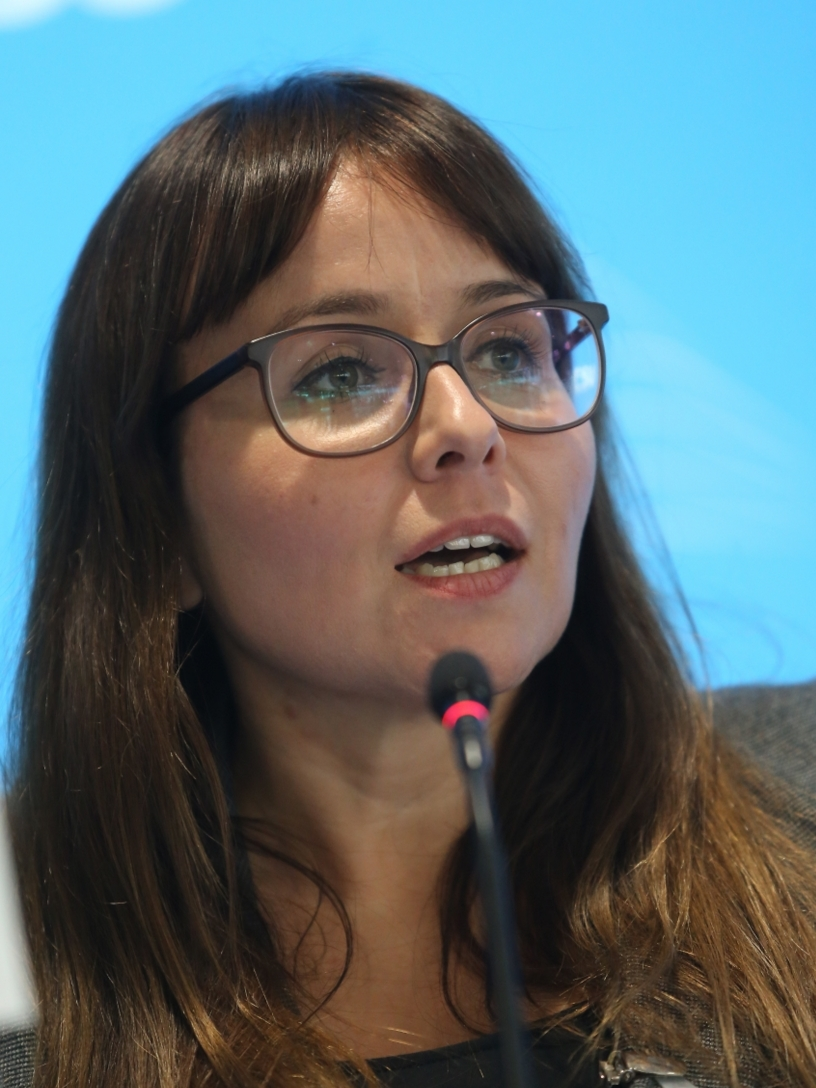
Born in Leverkusen, Cemile Giousouf is the daughter of ethnic Turkish migrants from Greece. Giousouf was the first German of Turkish Western Thracian origin to become a member of the German parliament. She was also the CDU's first ever elected Muslim MP in the Bundestag.

From the 1950s onward, the Turkish minority of Greece, particularly the Turks of Western Thrace, began to immigrate to Germany alongside other Greek citizens. Whilst many Western Thrace Turks had intended to return to Greece after working for a number of years, a new Greek law was introduced which effectively forced the minority to remain in Germany. Article 19 of the Greek Nationality Law gave the government the power to strip "non-ethnic" Greek citizens of their citizenship upon leaving the country without the possibility of an appeal. This law continued to affect Western Thrace Turks studying in Germany in the late 1980s, even those who had intended to return to Greece. It was not repealed until 1998.

Despite risking the loss of their Greek citizenship, Western Thrace Turks continued to emigrate to Germany in large numbers. Firstly, in the 1960s and 1970s many came to Germany because the Thracian tobacco industry was affected by a severe crisis and many tobacco growers lost their income. Between 1970 and 2010, approximately 40,000 Western Thrace Turks emigrated to Western Europe, most of whom settled in Germany. In addition, between 2010 and 2018, a further 30,000 Western Thrace Turks left for Western Europe due to the Greek government-debt crisis. Of these 70,000 immigrants (which excludes the numbers which arrived before 1970), around 80% live in Germany.

In 2013 Cemile Giousouf became the first Western Thrace Turk to become a member of the German parliament. She was the first Muslim to be elected for the Christian Democratic Union of Germany.

==== North Macedonia ====
There has been migration from the Turkish Macedonian minority group which have come to Germany alongside other citizens of North Macedonia, including ethnic Macedonians and Albanian Macedonians.

In 2021, Furkan Çako, who is a former Macedonian minister and member of the Security Council, urged Turkish Macedonians living in Germany to participate in North Macedonia's 2021 census.

==== Romania ====
Between 2002 and 2011 there was a significant decrease in the population of the Turkish Romanian minority group due to the admission of Romania into the European Union and the subsequent relaxation of the travelling and migration regulations. Hence, Turkish Romanians, especially from the Dobruja region, have joined other Romanian citizens (e.g. ethnic Romanians, Tatars, etc.) in migrating mostly to Germany, Austria, Italy, Spain and the UK.

=== Turkish migration from the Levant ===
==== Cyprus ====
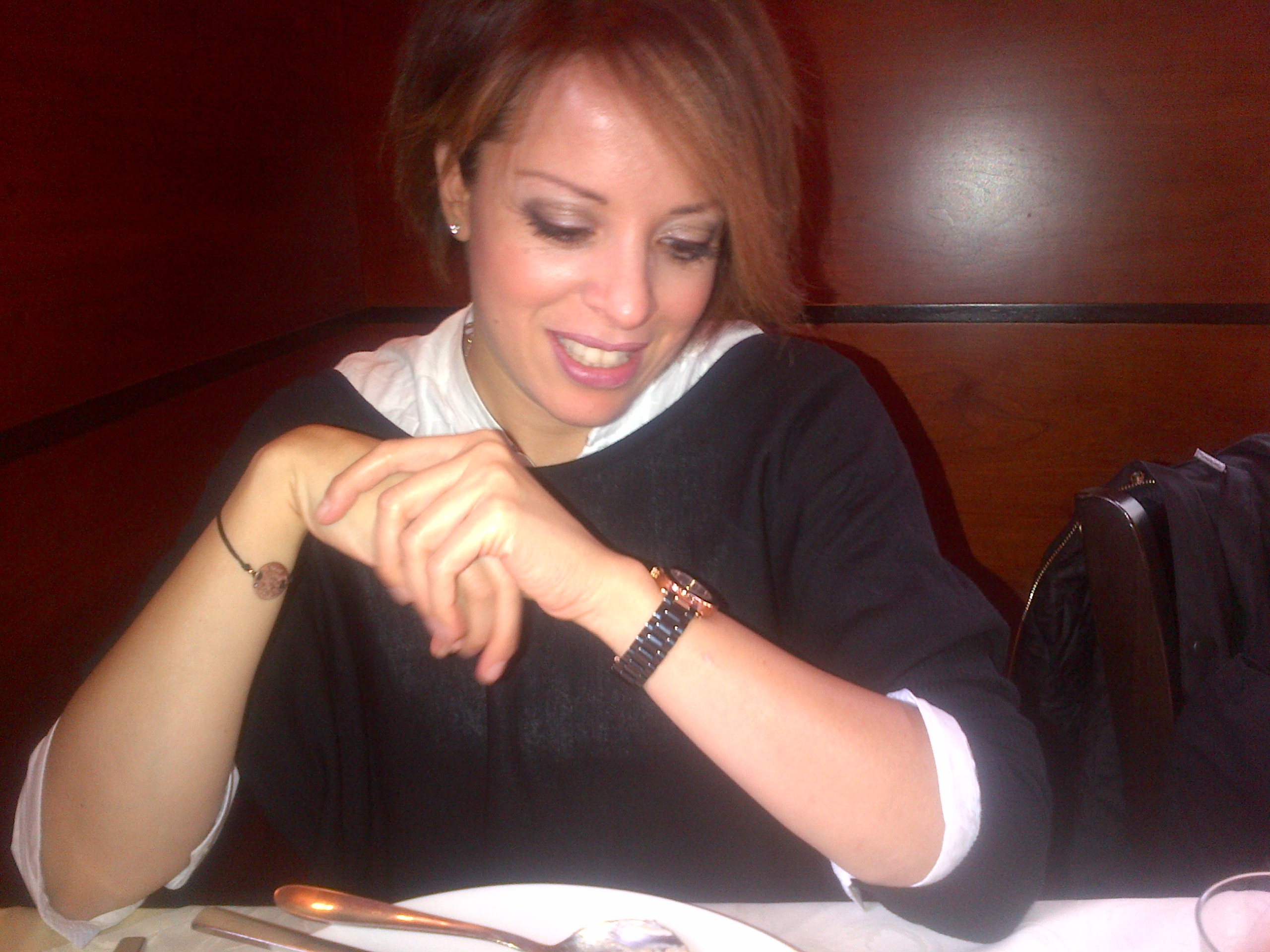
The renowned pianist Rüya Taner was born in Schwenningen, Germany, and is of Turkish Cypriot origin.

Turkish Cypriots migrants began to leave the island of Cyprus for Western Europe due to economic and political reasons in the 20th century, especially after the Cyprus crisis of 1963–64 and then the 1974 Cypriot coup d'état carried out by the Greek military junta which was followed by the reactionary Turkish invasion of the island. More recently, with the 2004 enlargement of the European Union, Turkish Cypriots who hold Cypriot citizenship have had the right to live and work across the European Union, including in Germany, as EU citizens. As of 2016, there are approximately 2,000 Turkish Cypriots in Germany, which is the second largest Turkish Cypriot diaspora in Western Europe (after the UK).

The TRNC (unrecognised) provides assistance to its Turkish Cypriots residents living in Germany via the TRNC Berlin Honorary Representative Office; the TRNC Köln Honorary Representative Office; the TRNC Bavarian Honorary Attaché; and the TRNC Bavarian Honorary Representative Office. These Representative Offices and Honorary Representatives also promote friendly relations between Northern Cyprus and Germany, as well as economic and cultural relations.

==== Lebanon ====
Due to the numerous wars in Lebanon since the 1970s onwards, many Turkish Lebanese people have sought refuge in Turkey and Europe, particularly in Germany. Indeed, many Lebanese Turks were aware of the large Turkish-German population and saw this as an opportunity to find work once settling in Europe. In particular, the largest wave of Turkish Lebanese migration occurred once the Israel-Lebanon war of 2006 began. During this period more than 20,000 Turks fled Lebanon, particularly from Beirut, and settled in European countries, including Germany.

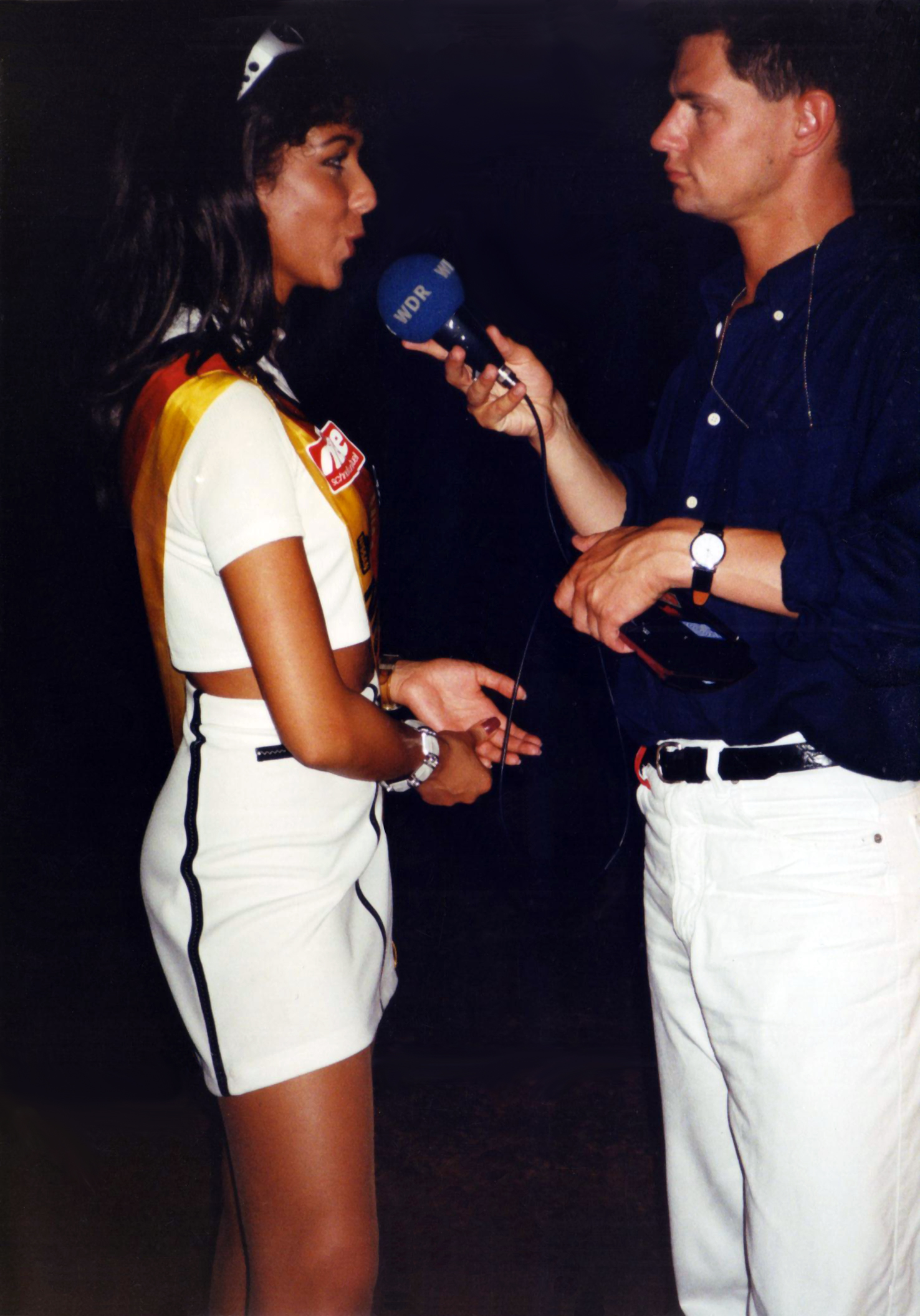
Of Turkish Iraqi origin, Yasemin Mansoor was crowned Miss Germany in 1996.

==== Iraq ====
In 2008 there were 85,000 Iraqis living in Germany, of which approximately 7,000 were from the Turkish Iraqi minority group; hence, the Iraqi Turks formed around 8.5% of the total number of Iraqi citizens living in Germany. The majority of Iraqi Turks live in Munich.

==== Syria ====
Established in Germany, the Suriye Türkmen Kültür ve Yardımlaşma Derneği – Avrupa, or STKYDA, ('Syrian Turkmen Culture and Solidarity Association – Europe') was the first Syrian Turkmen association to be launched in Europe. It was established in order to help the growing Syrian Turkmen community which arrived in the country since the European migrant crisis which started in 2014 and saw its peak in 2015. The association includes Syrian Turkmen youth activists originating from all Syrian cities and who are now living across Western European cities.

=== Turkish migration from the modern diaspora ===
In addition to ethnic Turkish people that have migrated to Germany from post-Ottoman modern nation-states, there has also been an increasing migration wave from the modern Turkish diaspora. For example, members of the Turkish Dutch community have also arrived in Germany as Dutch citizens. According to a study by Petra Wieke de Jong, focusing on second-generation Turkish-Dutch people specifically born between the years 1983 and 1992 only, 805 people from this age group and generation reported Germany as their country of emigration in 2001 to 2017. A further 1,761 people in this group did not report their emigration destination.

== Demographics ==
=== Population ===
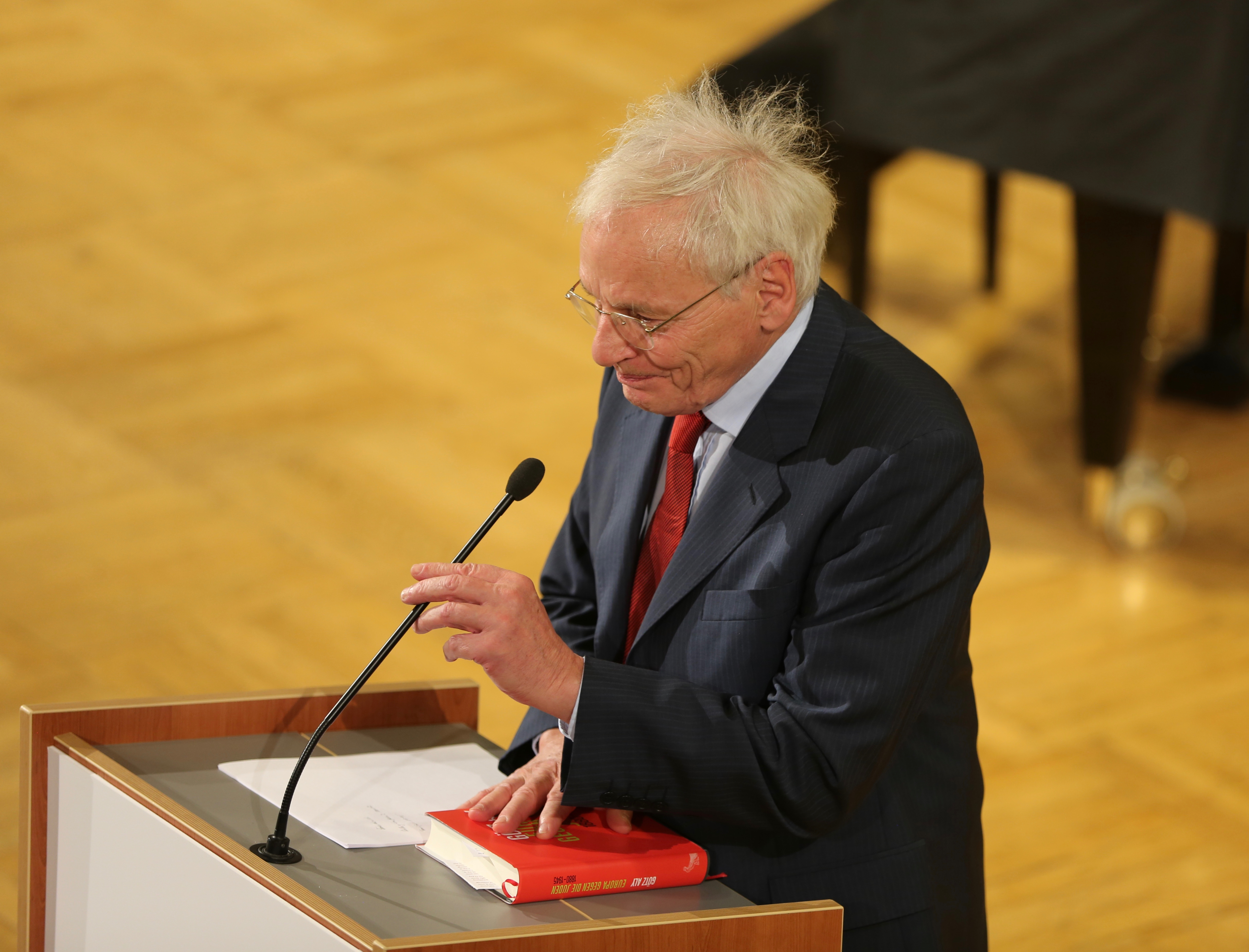
The historian Götz Aly is one of over 100 descendants of an ethnic Turk who was a chamberlain at the Prussian court. Assuming a generation gap of 35 years, the Aly family are now in their sixth, seventh and eighth generations.

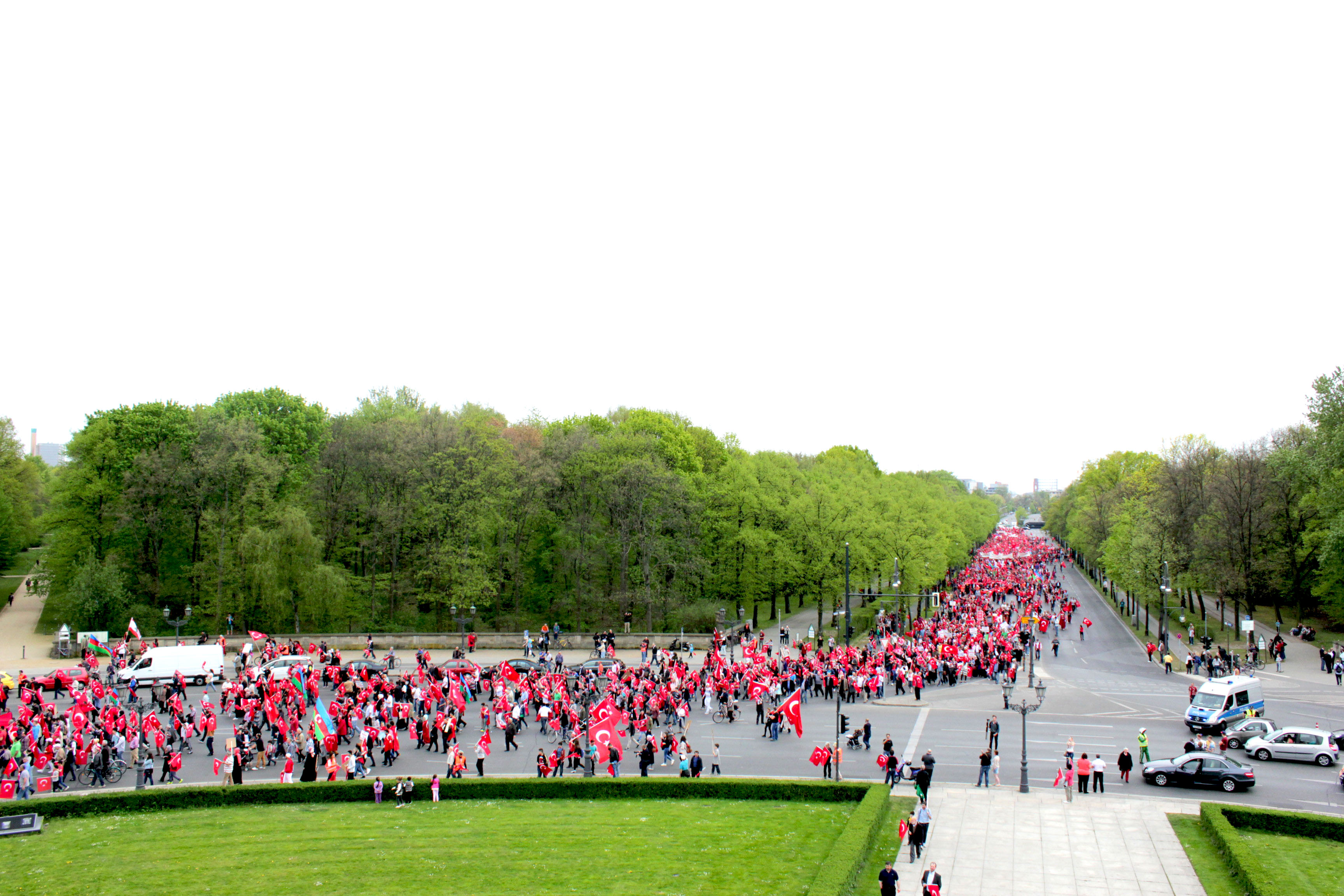
A Turkish demonstration in the capital city of Berlin.

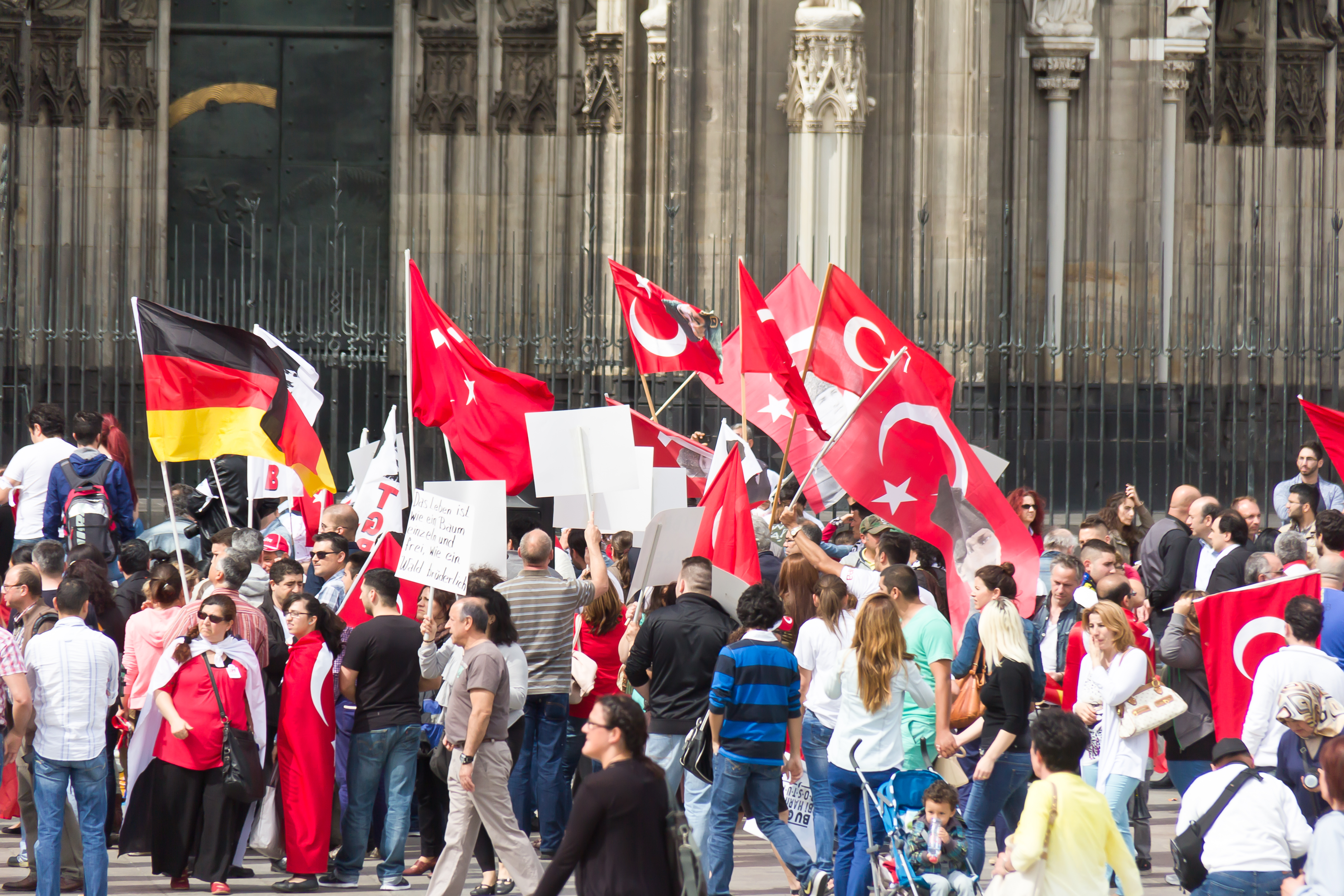
A Turkish demonstration in Cologne.

==== German state data and estimates ====
As of 31 December 2023, there were 1,514,805 people living in Germany who were born in Turkey, according to official figures from the Federal Statistical Office.

The German state does not allow citizens to self-declare their identity; consequently, the statistics published in the official German census does not show data on ethnicity. According to the 2023 estimation, roughly 3 million German residents had a "migration background" from Turkey.

==== Academic estimates ====
Throughout the decades estimates by academics of the Turkish-German population have varied. In 1990, David Scott Bell et al. put it at between 2.5 million and 3 million Turks in Germany. A lower 1993 estimate by Stephen J. Blank et al. said there were 1.8 million Turks. The German Government's Special Commission on Integration Barbara John estimated that there were more than 3 million Turks, including third-generation descendants, and that 79,000 new babies were born each year within the community. The estimate of three million was also given by other scholars in the mid-1990s. A higher estimate of 4 million Turks (including three generations) was reported by John Pilger in 1993 and the Deutsches Orient-Institut in 1994. Moreover, Marilya Veteto-Conrad said that in the German capital there was already "over a million Turks in Berlin alone" in 1996.

In 2003, Ina Kötter et al. said that there was "more than 4 million people of Turkish origin" in Germany; this has also been reiterated by other scholars. However, Michael Murphy Andregg said that by the 2000s "Germany was home to at least five million Turks"; various scholars have also given this estimate. Jytte Klausen cited German statistics in 2005 showing 2.4 million Turks, but acknowledged that unlike Catholics, Protestants, and Jews, the Turkish community cannot allocate their ethnic or religious identity in official counts.

=== Settlements ===
Distribution of Turkish citizens in districts of Germany in 2021

The Turkish community in Germany is concentrated predominantly in urban centers. The vast majority are found in the former West Germany, particularly in industrial regions such as the states of North Rhine-Westphalia (where a third of Turkish Germans live), and Baden-Württemberg and the working-class neighbourhoods of cities like Berlin, Hamburg, Bremen, Bochum, Bonn, Cologne, Dortmund, Duisburg, Düsseldorf, Essen, Frankfurt, Hanover, Heidelberg, Mannheim, Mainz, Nuremberg, Munich, Stuttgart, Aachen and Wiesbaden. Among the German districts in 2011, Duisburg, Gelsenkirchen, Heilbronn, Herne and Ludwigshafen had the highest shares of migrants from Turkey according to census data.

=== Return migration ===
In regards to return-migration, many Turkish nationals and Turkish Germans have also migrated from Germany to Turkey, for retirement or professional reasons. Official German records show that there are 2.8 million "returnees"; however, the German Embassy in Ankara estimates the true number to be four million, acknowledging the differences in German official data and the realities of the under-reporting by migrants.

== Integration ==
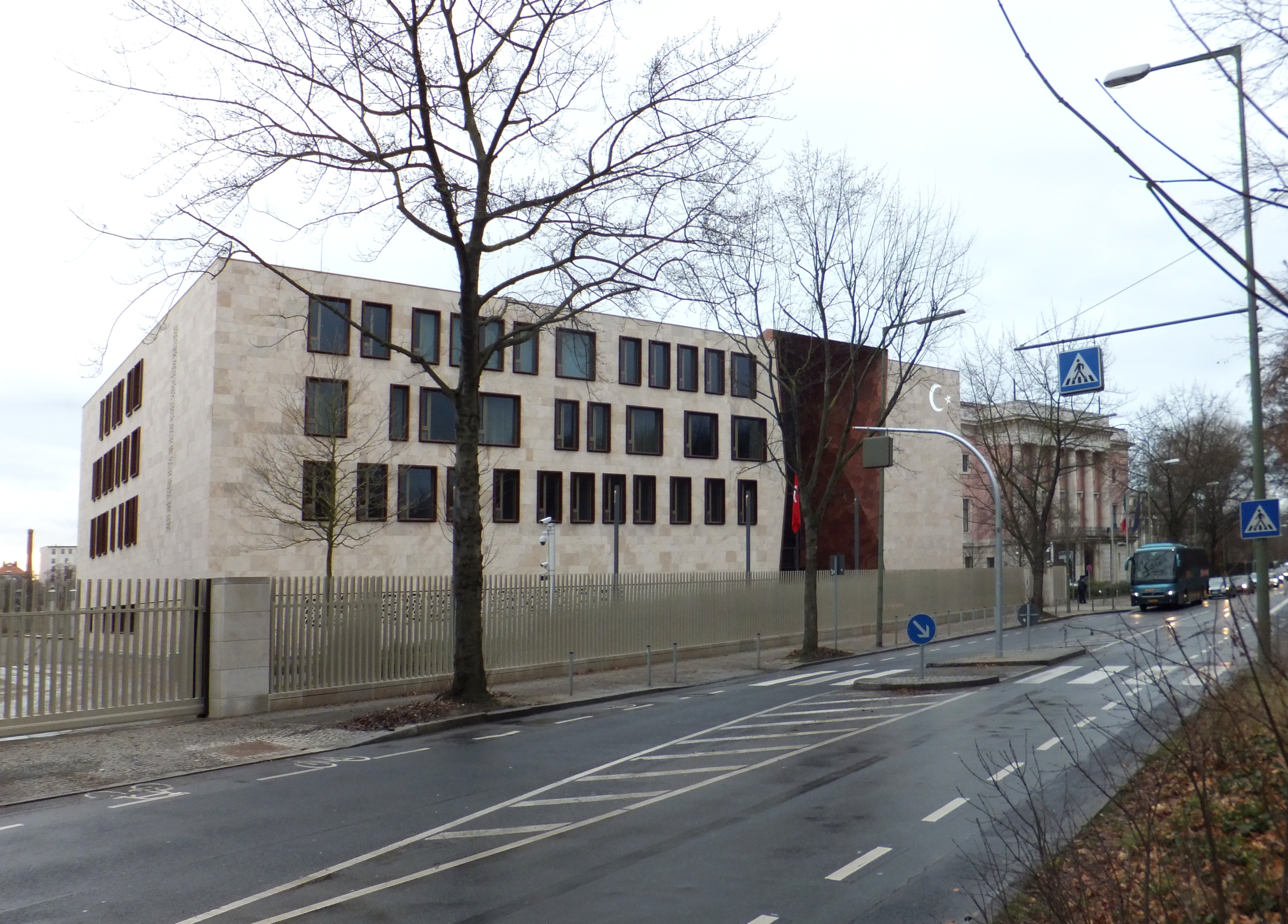
Turkish Embassy in Berlin, Germany

Turkish immigrants make up Germany's largest immigrant group and have been ranked last in Berlin Institute's integration ranking.

During a speech in Düsseldorf in 2011, Turkish Prime Minister Recep Tayyip Erdoğan urged Turks in Germany to integrate, but not assimilate, a statement that caused a political outcry in Germany.

The Turks in Turkey (especially more progressive-leaning, and those from large cities like Istanbul) can occasionally have somewhat negative views of the Turks in Germany, specifically (descendants of) the first Turkish Gastarbeiters, for their generally more conservative/Islamist political views, sometimes they are called almancı (literal translation "german-er", Almanya meaning "Germany" in Turkish). They are sometimes regarded as "having insufficiently assimilated by the Germans, yet having excessively assimilated by the Turks in the homeland".

=== Citizenship ===
For decades Turkish citizens in Germany were unable to become German citizens because of the traditional German construct of "nationhood". The legal notion of citizenship was based on "blood ties" of a German parent (jus sanguinis) – as opposed to citizenship based on country of birth and residence (jus soli). This adhered to the political notion that Germany was not a country of immigration. For this reason, only those who were of partial Turkish origin (and had one parent who was ethnically German) could obtain German citizenship.

In 1990 Germany's citizenship law was somewhat relaxed with the introduction of the Foreigner's Law; this gave Turkish workers the right to apply for a permanent residency permit after eight years of living in the country. People of Turkish origin born in Germany, who were also legally "foreign", were given the right to acquire German citizenship at the age of eighteen, provided that they gave up their Turkish citizenship. There was no right to dual citizenship out of fears it would increase the Turkish population in the country. Chancellor Helmut Kohl officially gave this as the main reason for denying dual citizenship in 1997:

If today [1997] we give in to demands for dual citizenship, we would soon have four, five, or six million Turks in Germany, instead of three million – Chancellor Helmut Kohl, in 1997.

However, in 1999 the centre-left government of Gerhard Schröder further liberalised Germany's citizenship laws. Non-citizens became eligible for naturalization after eight years of legal residence in the country, and children born in Germany to foreign parents automatically became citizens if at least one had been a permanent resident for at least eight years. Such children also gained a right to dual citizenship until the age of 23, at which point they had to choose between their German citizenship or the citizenship of their parent's country of birth. Former Turkish citizens who have given up their citizenship can apply for the 'Blue Card' (Mavi Kart), which gives them some rights in Turkey, such as the right to live and work in Turkey, the right to possess and inherit land or the right to inherit, but not the right to vote.

In 2000, the year following the citizenship reform, a then-record 187,000 people were naturalised in Germany, 44% (83,000) of whom were of Turkish origin. Over the following two decades, a further 630,000 Turkish people took German citizenship. By 2011 the Embassy of Germany, Washington, D.C. reported that as of 2005 there were 2 million Turks who already had German citizenship.

== Culture ==
The Turkish people who immigrated to Germany brought their culture with them, including their language, religion, food, and arts. These cultural traditions have also been passed down to their descendants who maintain these values. Consequently, Turkish Germans have also exposed their culture to the greater German society. Numerous Turkish restaurants, grocery stores, teahouses, and mosques are scattered across Germany. The Turks in Germany have also been exposed to German culture, which has influenced the Turkish dialect spoken by the Turkish community in Germany.

=== Food ===
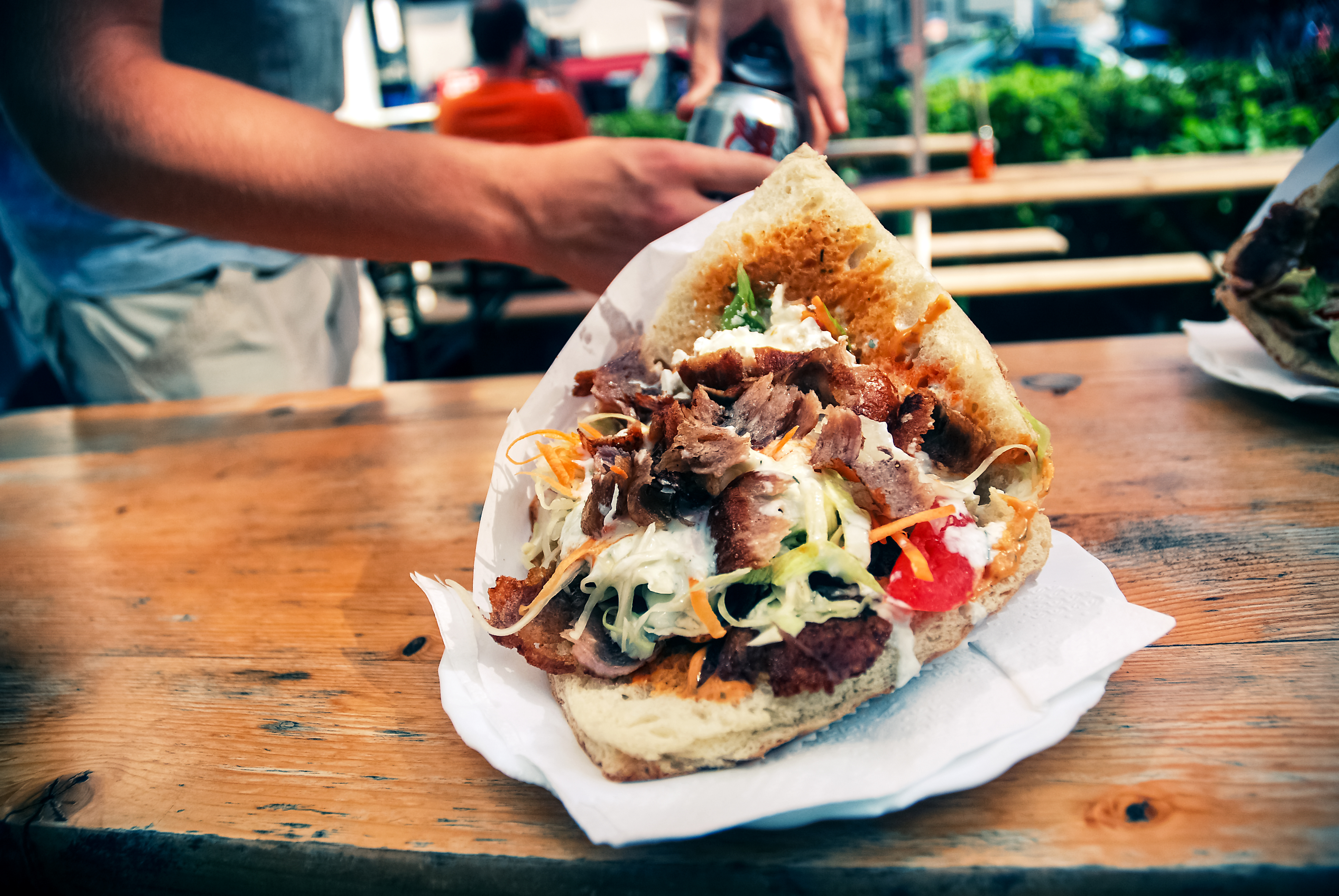
Döner Kebab, one of the most popular fast foods in Germany, made by a Turk

Turkish cuisine first arrived in Germany during the sixteenth century and was consumed among aristocratic circles. However, Turkish food became available to the greater German society from the mid-twentieth century onwards with the arrival of Turkish immigrants. By the early 1970s Turks began to open fast-food restaurants serving popular kebap dishes. Today there are Turkish restaurants scattered throughout the country selling popular dishes like döner kebap in take-away stalls to more authentic domestic foods in family-run restaurants. Since the 1970s, Turks have opened grocery stores and open-air markets where they sell ingredients suitable for Turkish home-cooking, such as spices, fruits, and vegetables.

=== Language ===
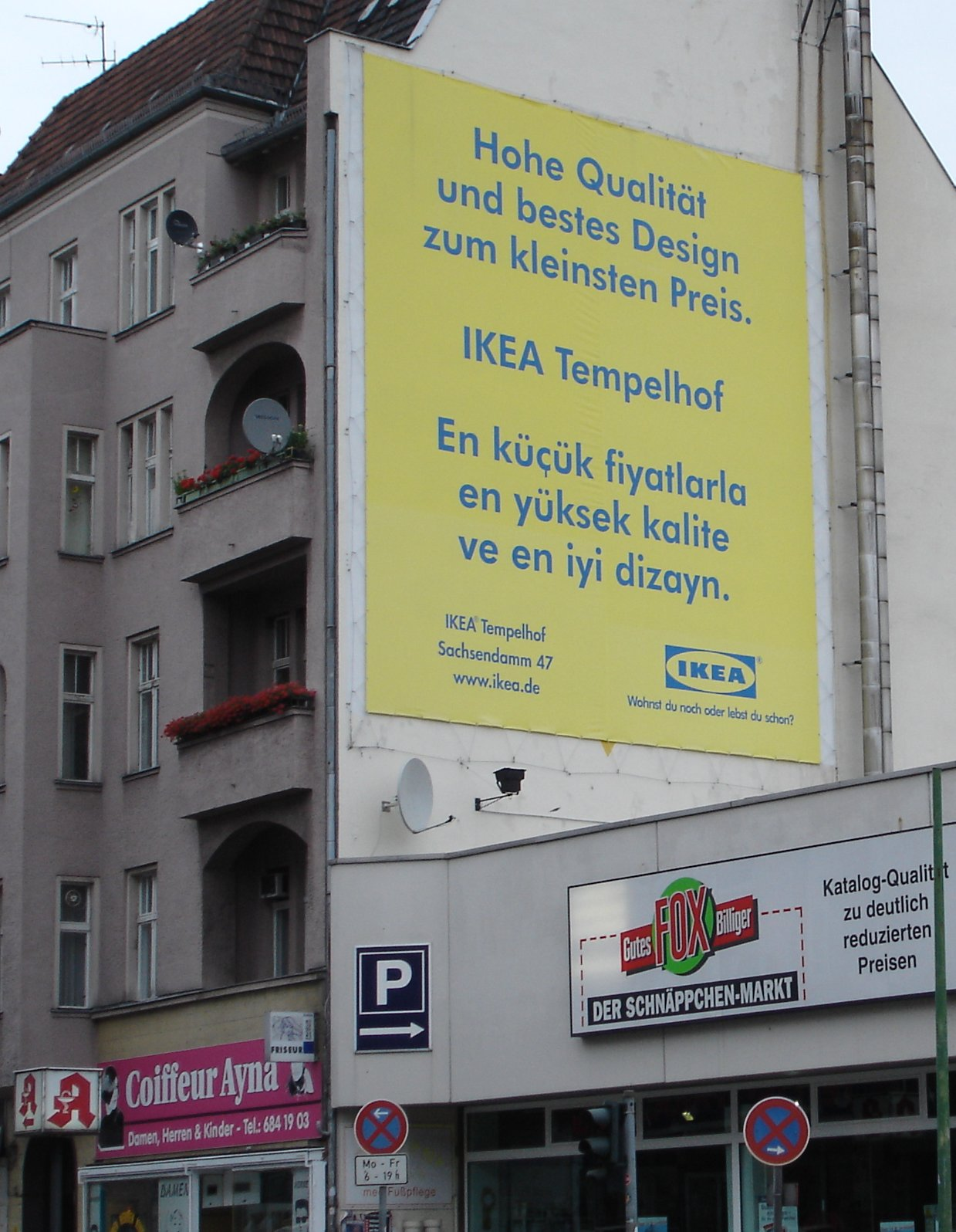
An advertisement by the IKEA branch in Berlin written in the German and Turkish languages.

Turkish is the second most spoken language in Germany, after German. It was brought to the country by Turkish immigrants who spoke it as their first language. These immigrants mainly learned German through employment, mass media, and social settings, and it has now become a second language for many of them. Nonetheless, most Turkish immigrants have passed down their mother tongue to their children and descendants. In general, Turkish Germans become bilingual at an early age, learning Turkish at home and German in state schools; thereafter, a dialectal variety often remains in their repertoire of both languages.

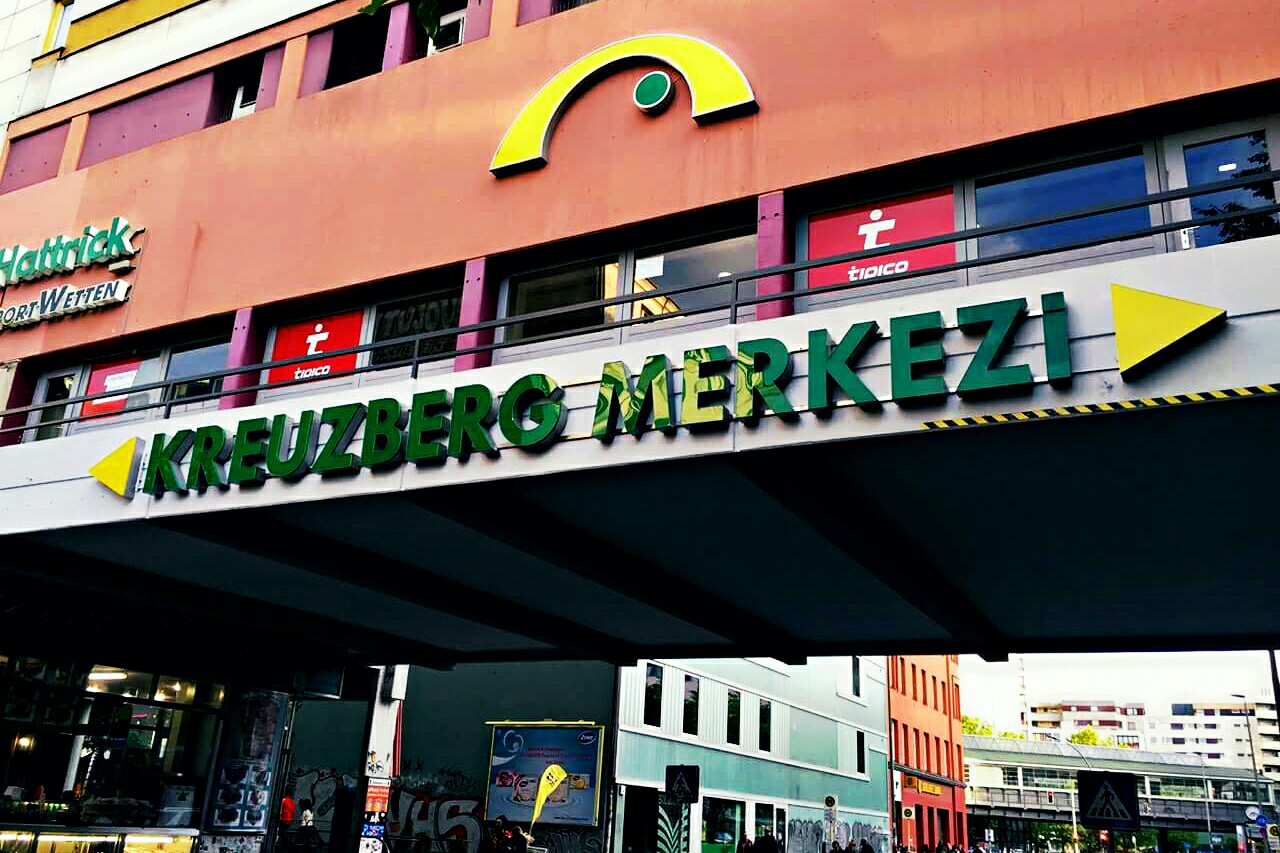
A symbolic sign at the entrance of Kreuzberg written in the Turkish language: "Kreuzberg Merkezi" (Kreuzberg Centre).

Turkish Germans mainly speak the German language more fluently than their "domestic"-style Turkish language. Consequently, they often speak the Turkish language with a German accent or a modelled German dialect. It is also common within the community to modify the Turkish language by adding German grammatical and syntactical structures. Parents generally encourage their children to improve their Turkish language skills further by attending private Turkish classes or choosing Turkish as a subject at school. In some states of Germany the Turkish language has even been approved as a subject to be studied for the Abitur.

Turkish has also been influential in greater German society. For example, advertisements and banners in public spaces can be found written in Turkish. Hence, it is also familiar to other ethnic groups – it can even serve as a vernacular for some non-Turkish children and adolescents in urban neighborhoods with dominant Turkish communities.

It is also common within the Turkish community to code-switch between the German and Turkish languages. By the early 1990s a new sociolect called Kanak Sprak or Türkendeutsch was coined by the Turkish-German author Feridun Zaimoğlu to refer to the German "ghetto" dialect spoken by the Turkish youth. However, with the developing formation of a Turkish middle class in Germany, there is an increasing number of people of Turkish-origin who are proficient in using the standard German language, particularly in academia and the arts.

=== Religion ===
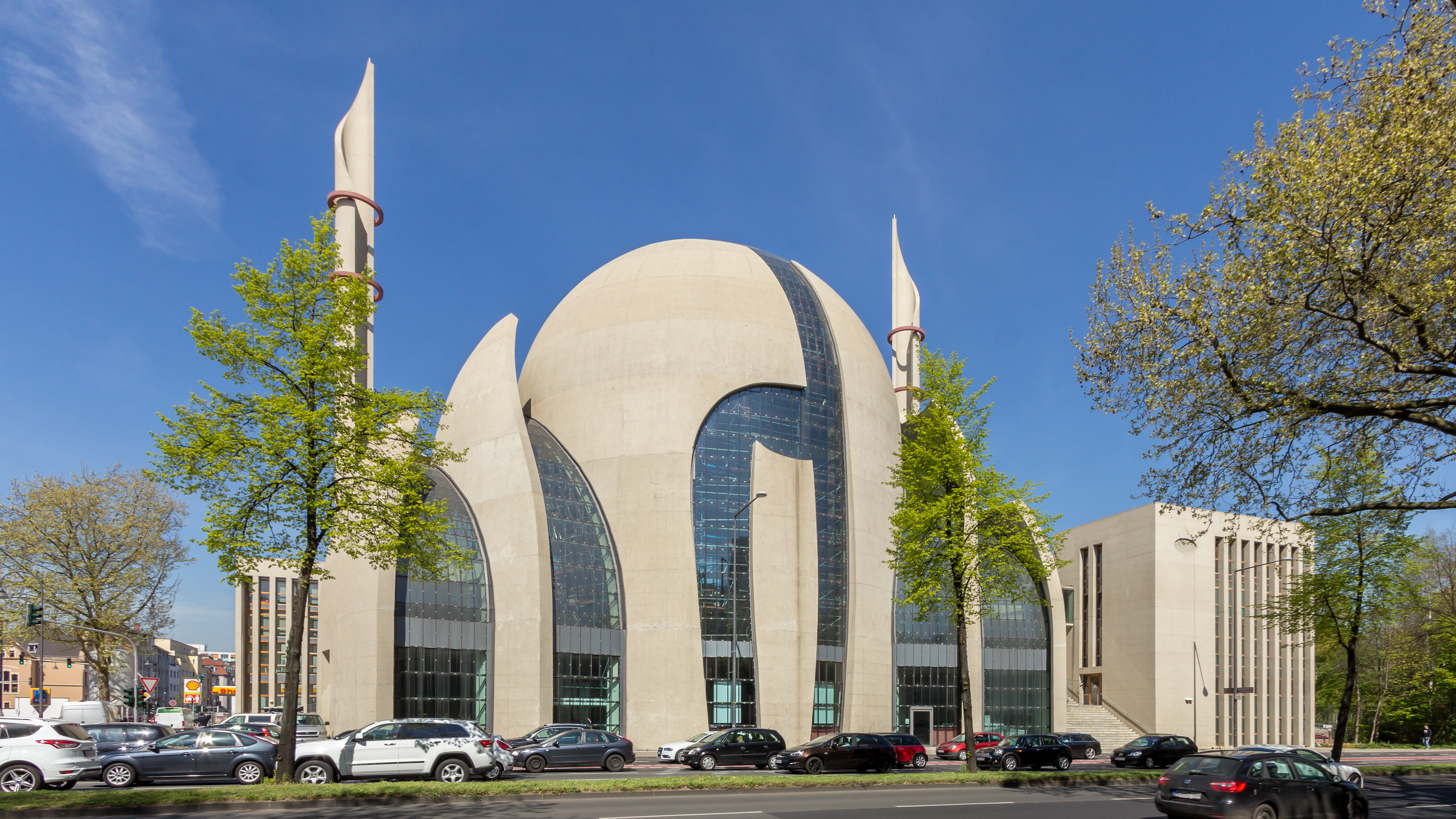
The Cologne Central Mosque, built in 2017 by the Turkish-Islamic Union for Religious Affairs, is the biggest mosque in Germany

The Turkish people in Germany are predominantly Muslim and form the largest ethnic group which practices Islam in Germany. Since the 1960s, "Turkish" was seen as synonymous with "Muslim"; this is because Islam is considered to have a "Turkish character" in Germany. This Turkish character is particularly evident in the Ottoman/Turkish-style architecture of many mosques scattered across Germany. In 2016, approximately 2,000 of Germany's 3,000 mosques were Turkish, of which 900 were financed by the Diyanet İşleri Türk-İslam Birliği (DİTİB), an arm of the Turkish government, and the remainder by other political Turkish groups. There is an ethnic Turkish Christian community in Germany; most of them came from recent Muslim Turkish backgrounds. Germany's biggest mosque, the Cologne Central Mosque, was commissioned by DİTİB and completed in 2017. It is also the biggest European mosque outside of Turkey.

== Discrimination and anti-Turkism ==
=== Discrimination ===
External videos
- Attack on Turkish elementary school pupil in Duisburg TRT World

In 1985 the German journalist Günter Wallraff shocked the German public with his internationally successful book Ganz unten ('In the Pits' or 'Way Down') in which he reported the discrimination faced by Turkish people in German society. He disguised himself as a Turkish worker called "Ali Levent" for over two years and took on minimal-wage jobs and confronted German institutions. He found that many employers did not register or insure their Turkish workers. Major employers like Thyssen did not give their Turkish workers adequate breaks and did not pay them their full wage.

It has been, and still is, also reported that Turkish-Germans were being discriminated against at school from early age and in workplaces. It has also been found that teachers discriminate against non-German sounding names and tend to give worse grades based on names alone. The studies showed that even though a student might have had the exact number of right and wrong answers, or the exact paper, the teachers favour German names. This creates a vicious cycle where teachers favour students of German descent over non-Germans, including Turkish students, which results in worse education. This later results in Turkish people not being able to take what are deemed to be "higher-skill jobs", which nonetheless deepens the cracks in the cycle.

There are also the reports of discrimination against Turkish-Germans in other areas such as sports, one example being the discrimination against the football player Mesut Özil.

=== Attacks against the Turkish community in Germany ===
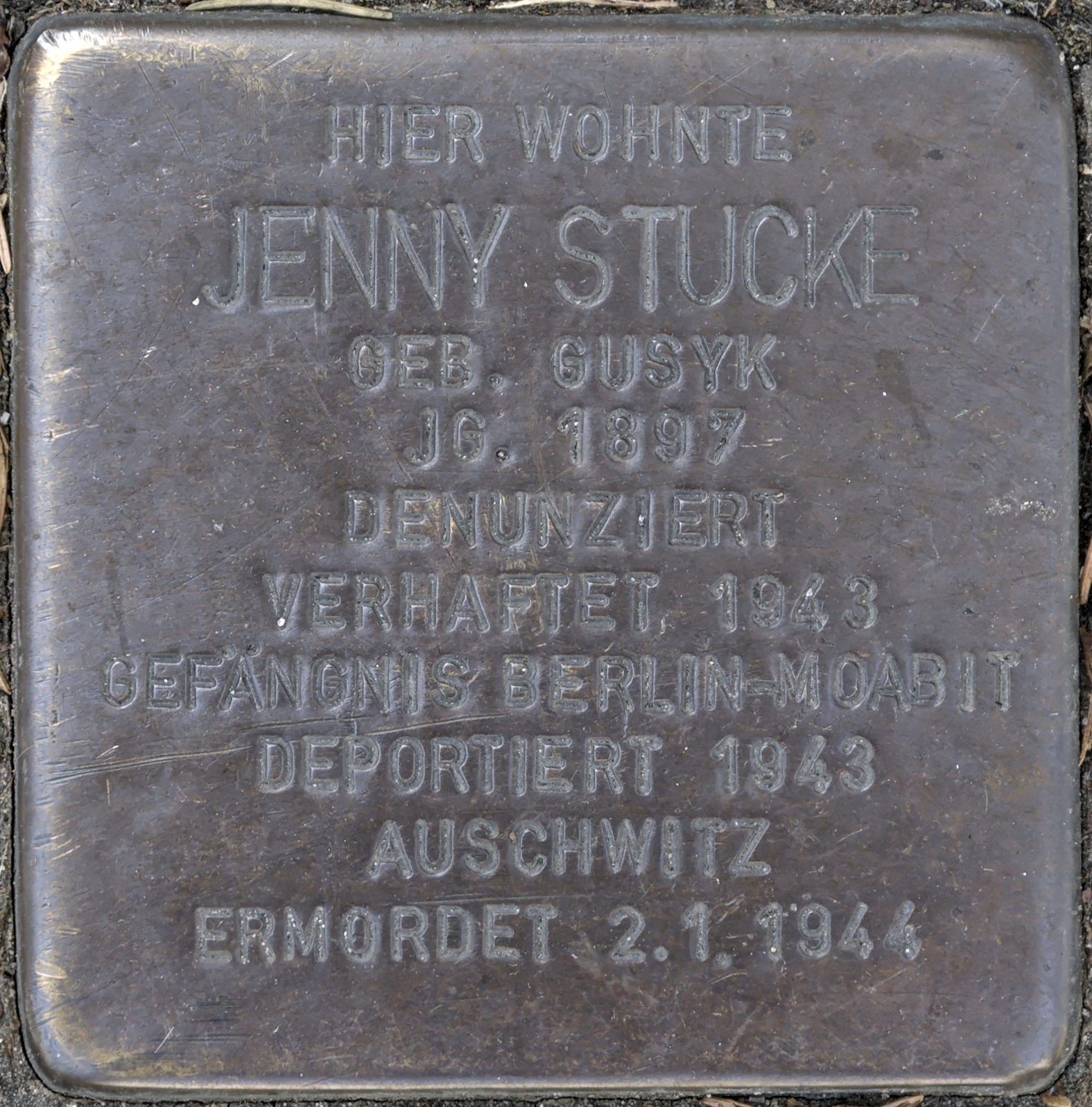
Jenny Gusyk

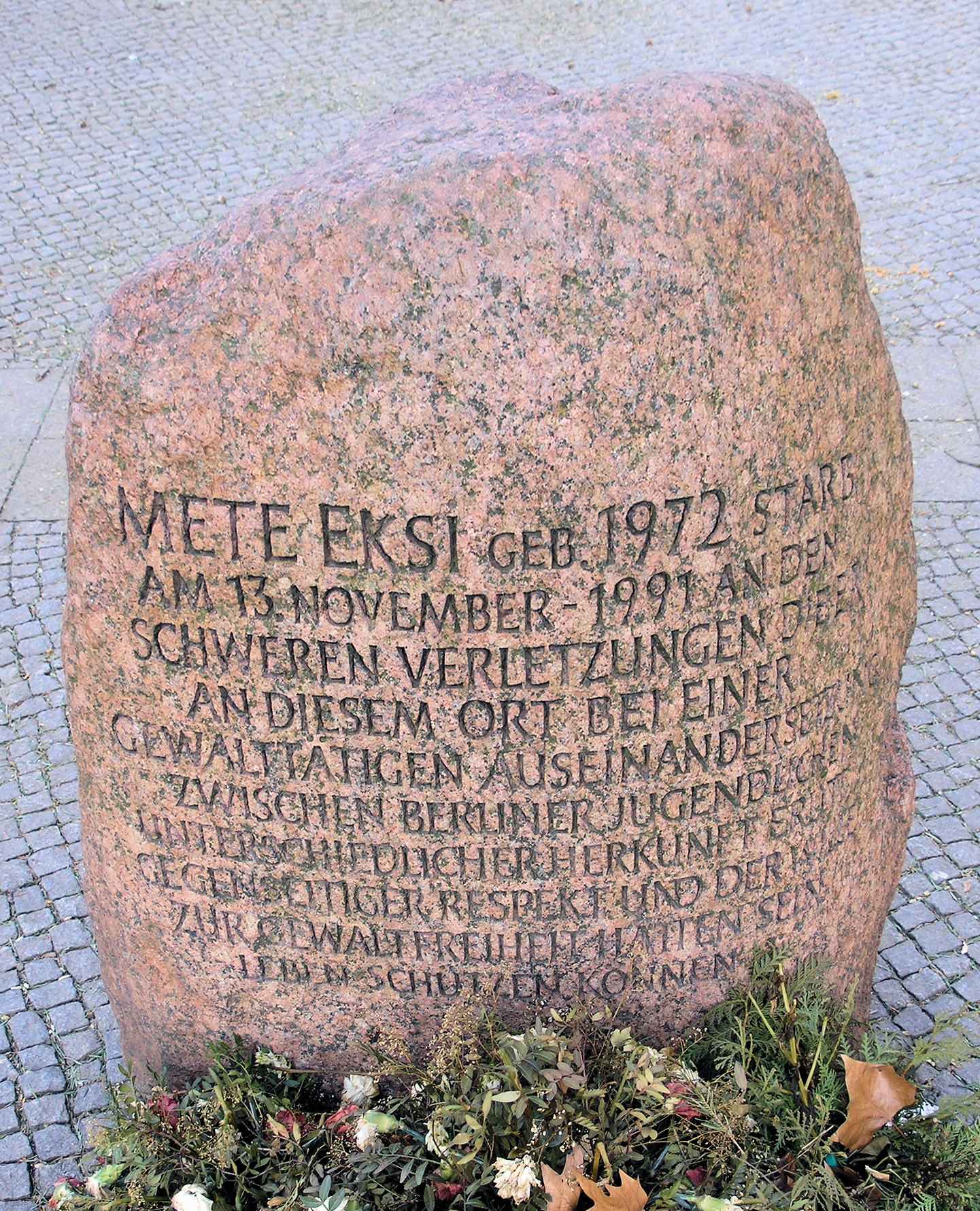
A memorial stone in remembrance of Mete Ekşi.

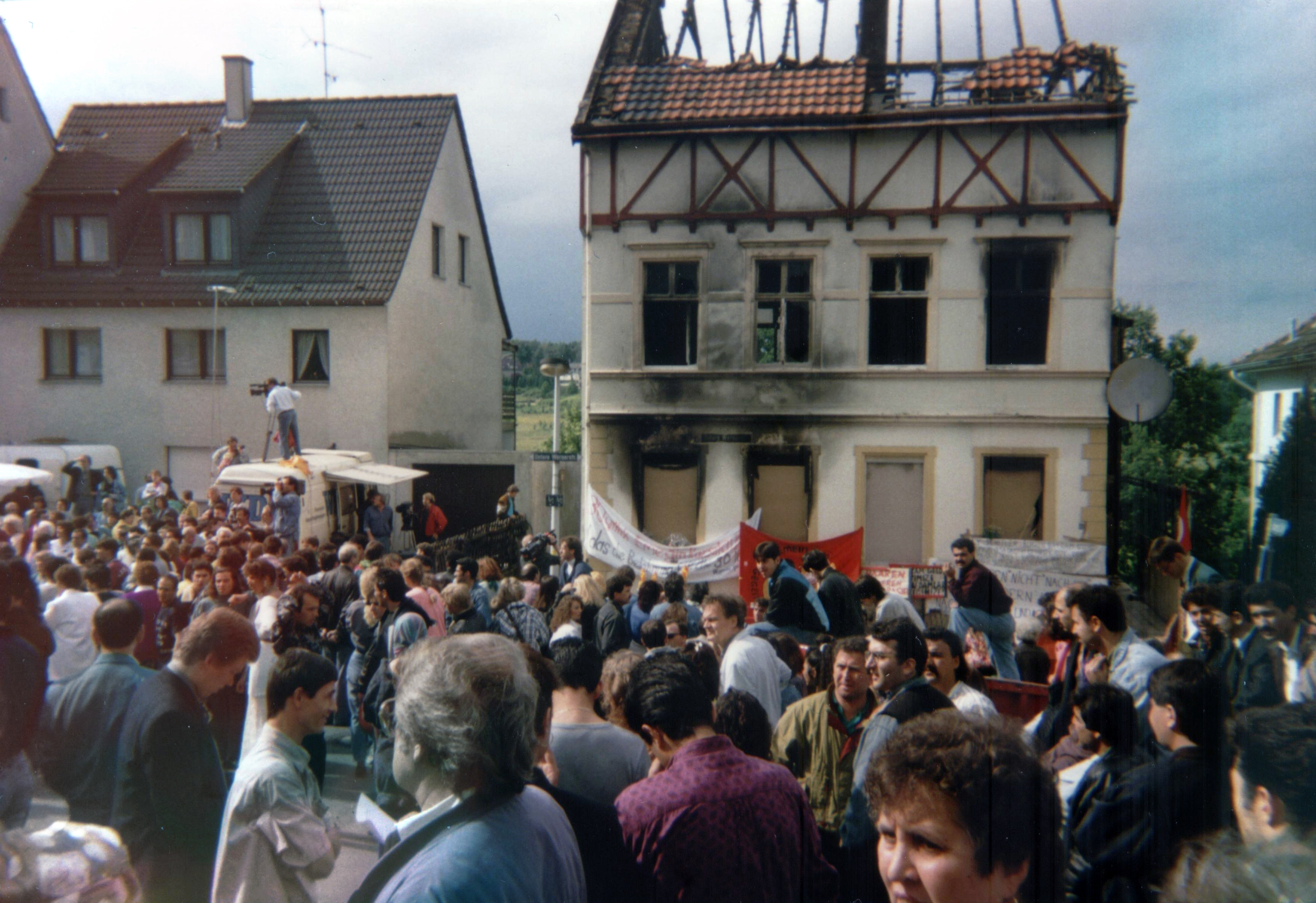
A demonstration condemning the neo-Nazi attacks outside the house of the Turkish victims of the Solingen arson attack of 1993.

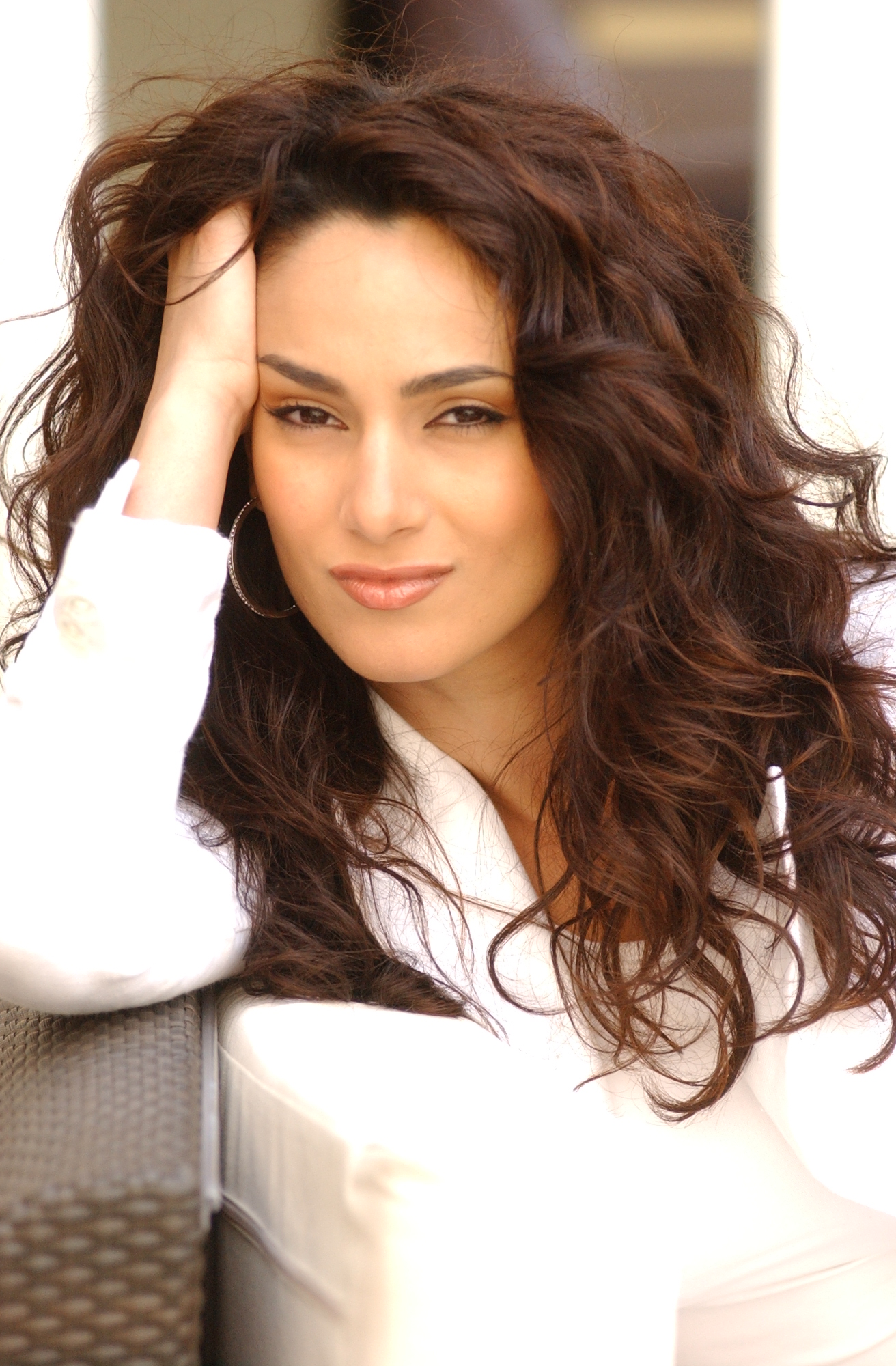
Former Miss Germany (2005) Aslı Bayram is an Ambassador for Crime Prevention. In 1994, her father was shot dead by a neo-Nazi and she was shot in her left arm.

The fall of the Berlin Wall in 1989, and the reunification of Germany, saw a sharp rise in violent attacks against Turkish-Germans. A series of arson attacks, bombings, and shootings have targeted the Turkish community in both public and private spaces, such as in their homes, cultural centres, and businesses. Consequently, many victims have been killed or severely injured by these attacks.

On 27 October 1991, Mete Ekşi, a 19-year-old student from Kreuzberg, along with his four Turkish friends were involved in a violent confrontation with three German brothers. As a consequence, Ekşi died due to head injuries caused with a baseball bat which was wrested by the 25-year-old attacker from Ekşi's friend. His death sparked a massive outrage in the local Turkish community alleging fascist motives. This was, however, dismissed by a court as an "overreaction" while acknowledging and condemning open and hidden xenophobia in Germany. His funeral in November 1991 was attended by 5,000 people.

A year after Ekşi's murder, on 22 November 1992, two Turkish girls, Ayşe Yılmaz and Yeliz Arslan, and their grandmother, Bahide Arslan, were killed by two neo-Nazis in an arson attack in their home in Mölln.

On 9 March 1993, Mustafa Demiral, aged 56, was attacked by two members of the German anti-immigrant political party "The Republicans" whilst waiting at a bus stop in Mülheim. The attackers verbally assaulted him prompting a defensive reaction after which one of the attackers threatened him with a gun pointing at his head. Demiral suffered a heart-attack and died at the scene of the crime.

Two months later, on 28 May 1993, four young neo-Nazi German men aged 16–23 set fire to the house of a Turkish family in Solingen. Three girls and two women died and 14 other members of the extended family were severely injured in the attack. German Chancellor Helmut Kohl did not attend the memorial services.

Neo-Nazi attacks continued throughout the 1990s. On 18 February 1994, the Bayram family were attacked on their doorstep by a neo-Nazi neighbour in Darmstadt. The attack was not well publicised until one of the victims, Aslı Bayram, was crowned Miss Germany in 2005. The armed neo-Nazi neighbour shot Aslı on her left arm and then the attacker shot Aslı's father, Ali Bayram, who died from the gunshot.

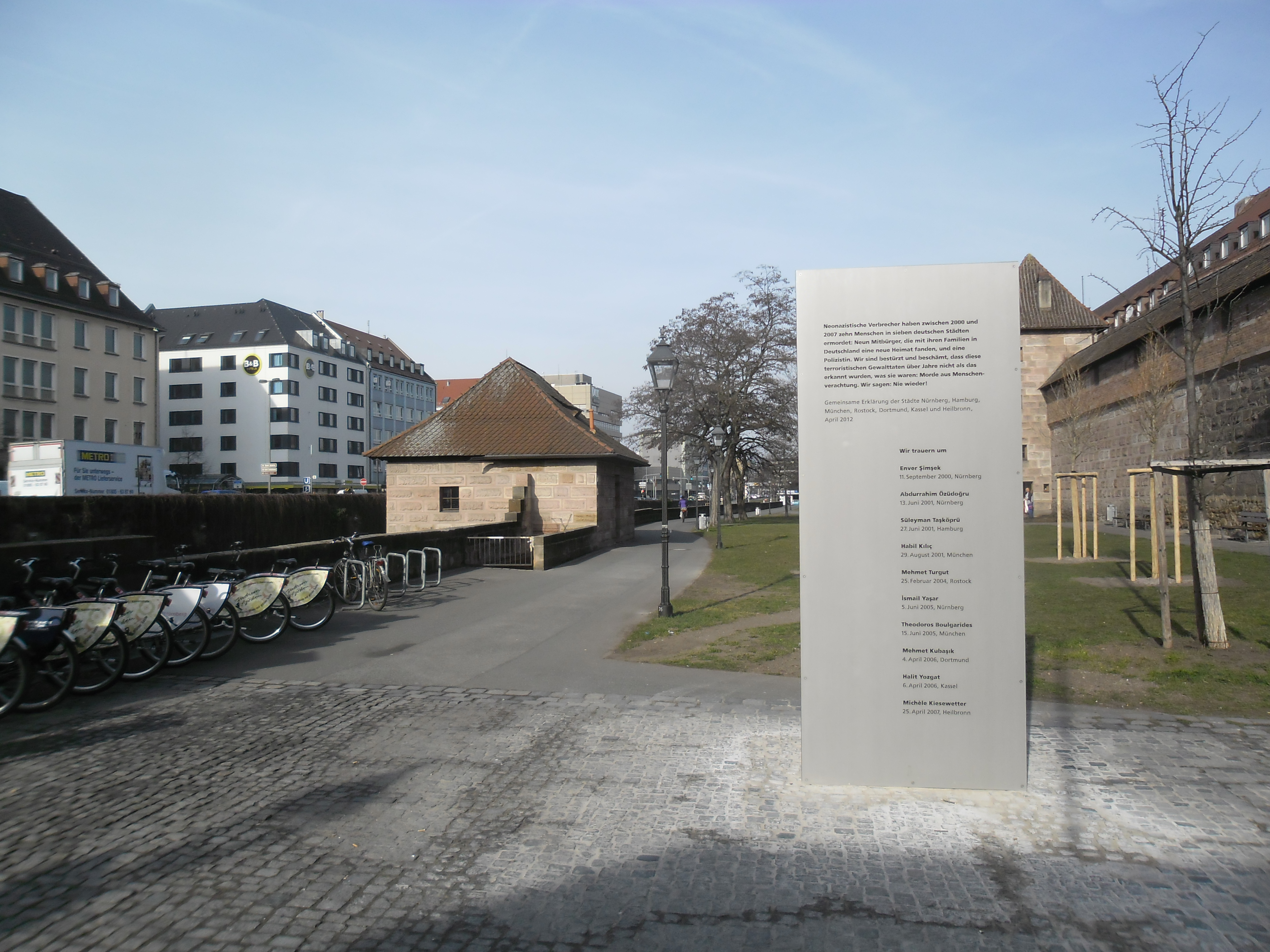
A memorial plaque, in Nuremberg, in remembrance of the victims of the "Bosphorus serial murders".

Between 2000 and 2006 several Turkish shopkeepers were attacked in numerous cities in Germany. The attacks were called the "Bosphorus serial murders" (Mordserie Bosporus) by the German authorities or pejoratively "Kebab murders" (Döner-Morde) by the press – which saw eight Turkish and one Greek person killed. Initially, the German media suspected that Turkish gangs were behind these murders. However, by 2011 it came to light that the perpetrators were in fact the neo-Nazi group the National Socialist Underground. This neo-Nazi group was also responsible for the June 2004 Cologne bombing which resulted in 22 Turkish people being injured.

On 3 February 2008, nine Turkish people, including five children, died in a blaze in Ludwigshafen (de). While there have been speculations by the Turkish media about the origin of the fire suspecting an arson attack and allegations of slow fire response time, these were rejected by an investigation and the cause of the fire was determined to have been an electrical fault. Nevertheless, many German and Turkish politicians including Turkish prime minister Recep Tayyip Erdoğan together with locally elected MP of the German parliament and appointed Minister of State for Integration in the Federal Chancellery and German Federal Government Commissioner for Migration, Refugees and Integration Maria Böhmer or Minister President of Rhineland-Palatinate Kurt Beck visited the site to express their condolences. Chancellor Angela Merkel was criticised for not attending a demonstration held in memory of the victims by 16,000 people.

Not all attacks on Turks have been perpetrated by neo-Nazi right-wing Germans: for example, the perpetrator of a mass shooting in Munich on 22 July 2016 who deliberately targeted people of Turkish and Arab origin. On that day, he killed nine victims, of which four victims were of Turkish origin: Can Leyla, aged 14, Selçuk Kılıç, aged 17, and Sevda Dağ, aged 45; as well as Hüseyin Dayıcık, aged 19, who was a Greek national of Turkish origin.

On 19 February 2020, a German neo-Nazi who expressed hate for non-German people, carried out two mass shootings in the city of Hanau, killing nine foreigners. He then returned to his home, killed his mother and committed suicide. Five of the nine victims were Turkish citizens.

On 2 April 2020, in Hamburg, a German family of Turkish descent claimed to have received a threatening letter with xenophobic content allegedly containing the coronavirus.

== Crime ==
External videos
- Almanya'daki Türk çetesi 36 Boys (Turkish Gangs in Germany) Al-Jazeera

=== Turkish gangs ===
In 2014, the annual report into organized crime, presented in Berlin by interior minister Thomas de Maizière, showed that there were 57 Turkish gangs in Germany. In 2016, the Die Welt and Bild reported that new Turkish motorbike gang, the Osmanen Germania is growing rapidly. The Hannoversche Allgemeine newspaper claimed that the Osmanen Germania is advancing more and more into red-light districts, which increases the likelihood of a bloody territorial battle with established gangs like the Hells Angels Motorcycle Club.

=== Turkish ultra-nationalist movements ===
As a result of the immigration wave in the 1960s and 1970s, far right and ultranationalist organisations established themselves in Germany such as the Grey Wolves, Türkische Föderation der Idealistenvereine in Deutschland, Europäisch-Türkische Union (ATB) and Türkisch Islamische Union Europa (ATIB). In 2017, ATB and ATIB together had about 303 locations with 18,500 members.

== Popular culture ==
=== Media ===
==== Films ====
The first phase in Turkish-German Cinema began in the 1970s and lasted through to the 1980s; it involved writers placing much of their attention on story-lines that represented the living and working conditions of the Turkish immigrant workers in Germany. By the 1990s a second phase shifted towards focusing more on mass entertainment and involved the work of Turkish and German-born Turkish German filmmakers. Critical engagements in story-telling increased further by the turn of the twenty-first century. Numerous films of the 1990s onwards launched the careers of many film directors, writers, and actors and actresses.

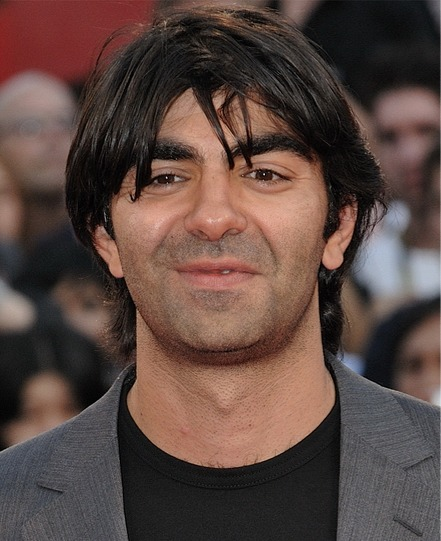
Fatih Akin is one of the most influential film directors in Turkish-German cinema.

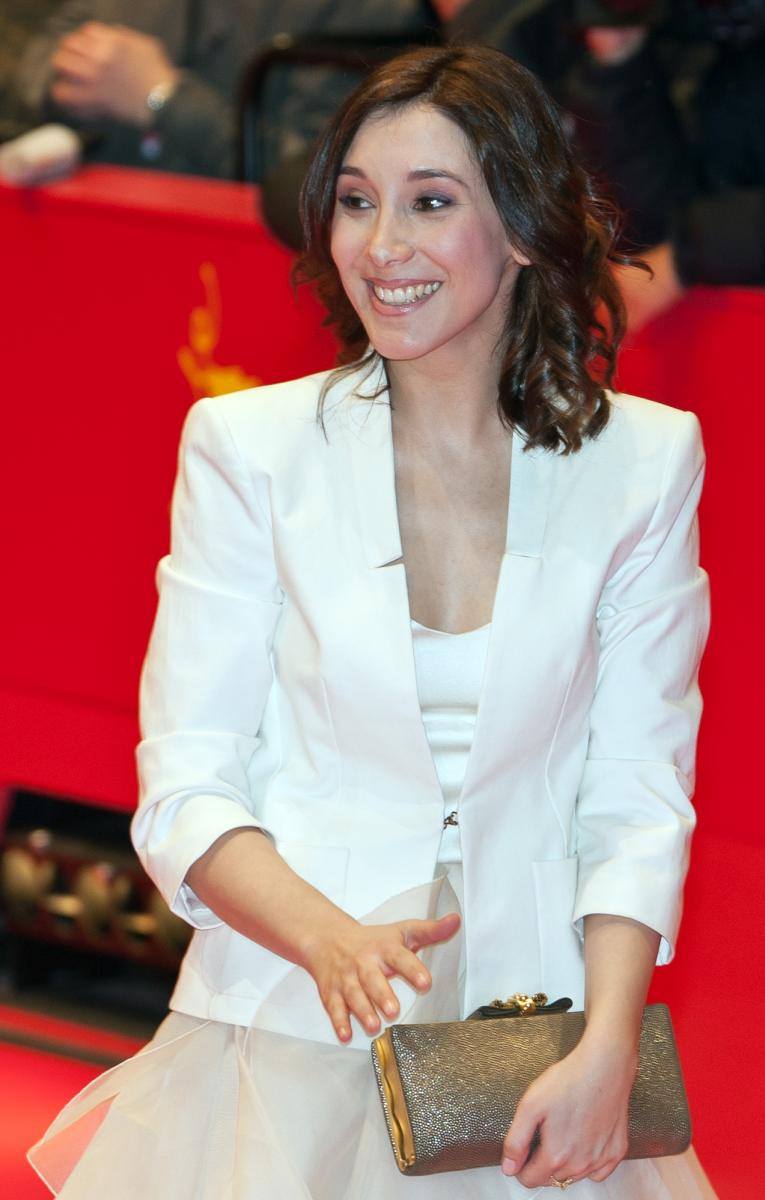
Sibel Kekilli has played a leading role in several Turkish-German films.

Fatih Akin's films, which often examine the place of the Turkish diaspora in Germany, have won numerous awards and have launched the careers of many of its cast including Short Sharp Shock (1998) starring Mehmet Kurtuluş and İdil Üner; Head-On (2004) starring Birol Ünel and Sibel Kekilli; Kebab Connection (2004) starring Denis Moschitto; The Edge of Heaven (2007) starring Baki Davrak; and Soul Kitchen (2009) starring Birol Ünel.

Other notable films which have a transnational context include Feridun Zaimoğlu's book-turned-film Kanak Attack (2000); Kerim Pamuk's Süperseks (2004); and Özgür Yıldırım's Chiko (2008). Several Turkish-German comedy films have also intentionally used comical stereotypes to encourage its viewers to question their preconceived ideas of "the Other", such as Züli Aladağ's film 300 Worte Deutsch ("300 words of German", 2013), starring Almila Bagriacik, Arzu Bazman, Aykut Kayacık, and Vedat Erincin. Similarly, other recent Turkish-German comedies like Meine verrückte türkische Hochzeit (Kiss me Kismet, 2006), starring Hilmi Sözer, Ercan Özçelik, Aykut Kayacık, and Özay Fecht, and the film Evet, I Do! (2009), starring numerous Turkish-German actors such as Demir Gökgöl, Emine Sevgi Özdamar, Erden Alkan, Gandi Mukli, Hülya Duyar, Jale Arıkan, Lilay Huser, Meral Perin, Mürtüz Yolcu, Sema Meray, and Sinan Akkuş, have emphasised how the Turkish and German cultures come together in contemporary German society. By focusing on similarities and differences of the two cultures using comedy, these films have shifted from the earlier Turkish-German drama films of the 1980s which focused on culture clashes; in its place, these films have celebrated integration and interethnic romance.

By 2011 Yasemin Şamdereli and Nesrin Şamdereli's comedy film Almanya: Welcome to Germany, starring Aylin Tezel and Fahri Yardım, premiered at the Berlin Film Festival and was attended by the German President and the Turkish Ambassador to celebrate fifty years since the mass migration of Turkish workers to Germany. Indeed, stories confronting Turkish labour migration, and debates about integration, multiculturalism, and identity, are reoccurring themes in Turkish-German cinema.

Nonetheless, not all films directed, produced or written by Turkish Germans are necessarily about the "Turkish-experience" in Germany. Several Turkish Germans have been involved in other genres, such as Bülent Akinci who directed the German drama Running on Empty (2006), Mennan Yapo who has directed the American supernatural thriller Premonition (2007), and Thomas Arslan who directed the German Western film Gold (2013).

Several Turkish-origin actors from Germany have also starred in Turkish films, such as Haluk Piyes who starred in O da beni seviyor (2001).

==== Television ====
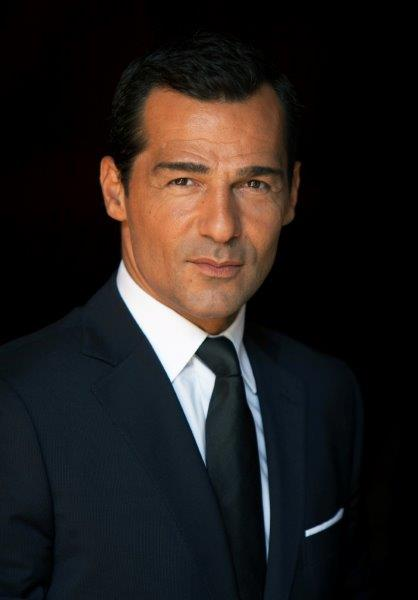
Erol Sander has starred as a leading role in several Turkish-German TV series'.

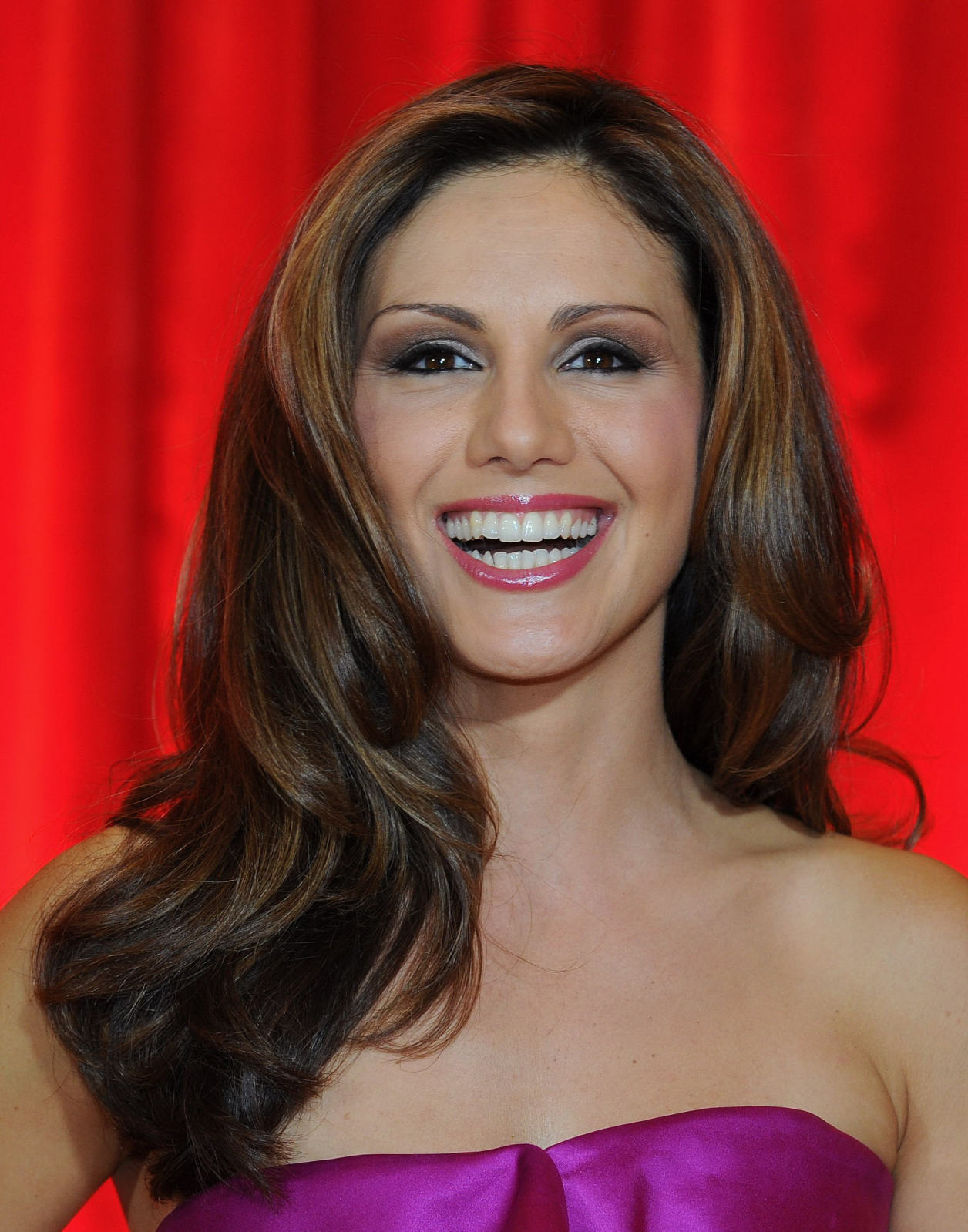
Nazan Eckes is a popular TV presenter.

In the first decade of the twenty-first century several German television series in which the experience of Turkish-Germans as a major theme gained popularity in Germany and in some cases gained popularity abroad too. For example, Sinan Toprak ist der Unbestechliche ("Sinan Toprak is the Incorruptible", 2001–2002) and Mordkommission Istanbul ("Homicide Unit Istanbul", 2008–present) which both star Erol Sander. In 2005 Tevfik Başer's book Zwischen Gott und Erde ("Time of Wishes") was turned into a primetime TV German movie starring Erhan Emre, Lale Yavaş, Tim Seyfi, and Hilmi Sözer, and won the prestigious Adolf Grimme Prize. Another popular Turkish-German TV series was Alle lieben Jimmy ("Everybody Loves Jimmy", 2006–2007) starring Eralp Uzun and Gülcan Kamps. Due to the success of Alle lieben Jimmy, it was made into a Turkish series called Cemil oldu Jimmy – making it the first German series to be exported to Turkey.

By 2006 the award-winning German television comedy-drama series Türkisch für Anfänger ('Turkish for Beginners', 2006–2009) became one of the most popular shows in Germany. The critically acclaimed series was also shown in more than 70 other countries. Created by Bora Dağtekin, the plot is based on interethnic-relations between German and Turkish people. Adnan Maral plays the role of a widower of two children who marries an ethnic German mother of two children – forming the Öztürk-Schneider family. The comedy consisted of fifty-two episodes and three seasons. By 2012 Turkish for Beginners was made into a feature film; it was the most successful German film of the year with an audience of 2.5 million.

Other notable Turkish-origin actors on German television include Erdoğan Atalay, Erkan Gündüz, İsmail Deniz, Olgu Caglar, Özgür Özata, Taner Sahintürk, and Timur Ülker.

Whilst Turkish-origin journalists are still underrepresented, several have made successful careers as reporters and TV presenters including Erkan Arikan and Nazan Eckes.

Many Turkish Germans have also starred in numerous critically acclaimed Turkish drama series. For example, numerous actors and actresses in Muhteşem Yüzyıl were born in Germany, including Meryem Uzerli, Nur Fettahoğlu, Selma Ergeç, and Ozan Güven. Other popular Turkish-German performers in Turkey include Fahriye Evcen who has starred in Yaprak Dökümü and Kurt Seyit ve Şura.

=== Comedy ===
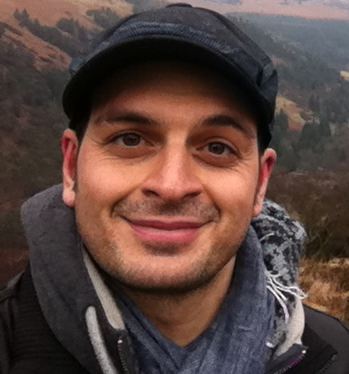
Stand-up-comedian Kaya Yanar

One of the first comedians of Turkish origin to begin a career as a mainstream comedian is Django Asül who began his career in satire in the 1990s. Another very successful comedian is Bülent Ceylan, who performed his first solo show "Doner for one" in 2002. By 2011 the broadcasting agency RTL aired Ceylan's own comedy show The Bulent Ceylan Show. Other notable comedians include Özcan Cosar, Fatih Çevikkollu, Murat Topal, Serdar Somuncu, Kaya Yanar, and female comedian Idil Baydar.

=== Literature ===
Since the 1960s Turkish people in Germany have produced a range of literature. Their work became widely available from the late 1970s onwards, when Turkish-origin writers began to gain sponsorships by German institutions and major publishing houses. Some of the most notable writers of Turkish origin in Germany include Akif Pirinçci, Alev Tekinay, Emine Sevgi Özdamar, Feridun Zaimoğlu, Necla Kelek, Renan Demirkan, and Zafer Şenocak. These writers approach a broad range of historical, social and political issues, such as identity, gender, racism, and language. In particular, German audiences have often been captivated by Oriental depictions of the Turkish community.

=== Music ===
In the mid-twentieth century the Turkish immigrant community in Germany mostly followed the music industry in Turkey, particularly pop music and Turkish folk music. Hence, the Turkish music industry became very profitable in Germany. By the 1970s, the "arabesque" genre erupted in Turkey and became particularly popular among Turks in Germany. These songs were often played and sang by the Turkish community in Germany in coffee houses and taverns that replicated those in Turkey. These spaces also provided the first stage for semi-professional and professional musicians. Consequently, by the end of the 1960s, some Turks in Germany began to produce their own music, such as Metin Türköz who took up themes of the Turkish immigration journey and their working conditions.

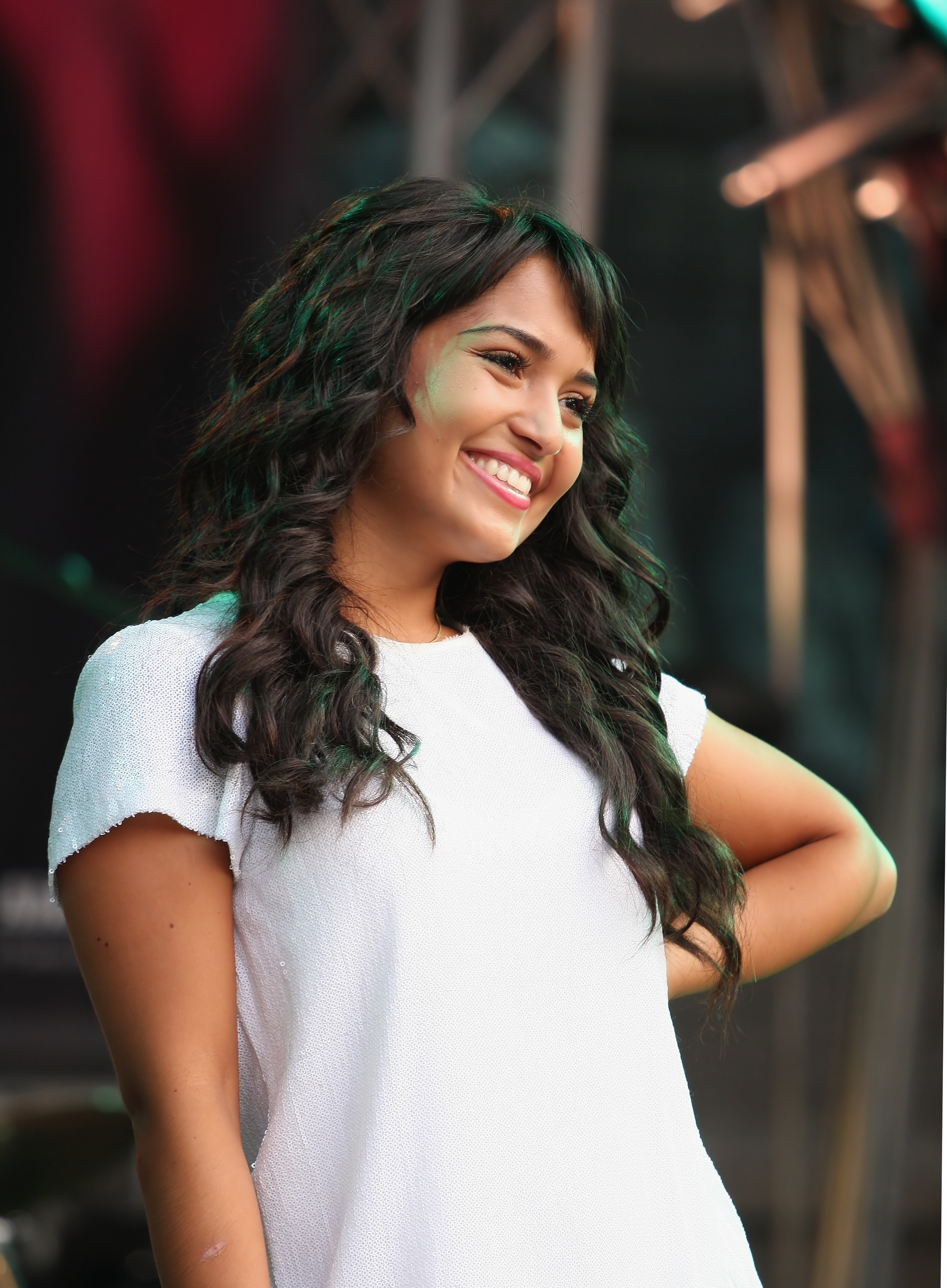
Bahar Kızıl is a founding member of the German pop group Monrose.

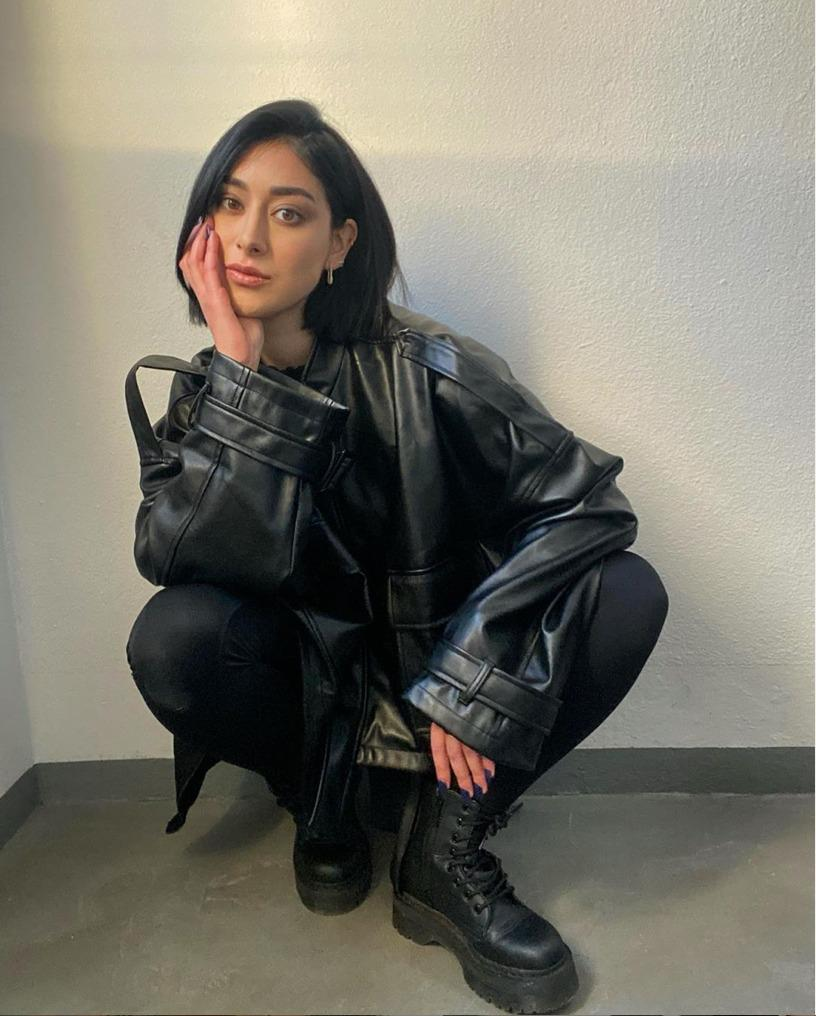
Elif Demirezer

By the 1990s the Turkish Germans became more influential in the music industry in both Germany and Turkey. In general, many Turkish Germans were brought up listening to Turkish pop music, which greatly influenced the music they began to produce. They were also influenced by hip-hop music and rap music.

Since the 1990s, the Turkish-German music scene has developed creative and successful new styles, such as "Oriental pop and rap" and "R'n'Besk" – a fusion of Turkish arabesque songs and R&B music. Examples of Oriental-pop and rap emerged in the early 2000s with Bassturk's first single "Yana Yana" ("Side by Side"). The "R'n'Besk"-style gained popularity in Germany with Muhabbet's 2005 single "Sie liegt in meinen Armen" ("She lies in my Arms"). By 2007 Muhabbet released the song "Deutschland" ("Germany"); the lyrics appeal to Germans to finally accept the Turkish immigrants living in the country.

In 2015 several Turkish-German musicians released the song "Sen de bizdensin" ("You are one of us"). The vocalists included Eko Fresh, Elif Batman, Mehtab Guitar, Özlem Özdil, and Volkan Baydar. Dergin Tokmak, Ercandize, Serdar Bogatekin, and Zafer Kurus were also involved in the production. The song was used in a campaign to celebrate the 10th anniversary of the Ay Yildiz telephone network and was extensively broadcast on TV and radio. Thereafter, a competition and group was formed called Die Stimme einer neuen Ära/Yeni neslin sesi ("The voice of the new generation") to find new Turkish-German talent and "Sen de bizdensin" was re-released with different lyrics.

Other Turkish-origin musicians in the German music industry include Bahar Kızıl (from the former girl-group Monrose), and winner of Germany's "Star Search" Martin Kesici.

Several Turkish-origin singers born in Germany have also launched their careers in Turkey, such as Akın Eldes, Aylin Aslım, Doğuş, İsmail YK, Ozan Musluoğlu, Pamela Spence, and Tarkan. The German-born Turkish Cypriot pianist Rüya Taner has also launched her career in Turkey.

There are also some musicians who perform and produce songs in the English language, such as Alev Lenz, DJ Quicksilver, DJ Sakin, and Mousse T.

Bülent Aris, music producer

==== Rappers ====
Especially in the 1990s, Turkish-German rap groups have sold hundreds of thousands of albums and singles in Turkey, telling their stories of integration and assimilation struggles they experienced due to discrimination they faced during their upbringing in Germany.

== Sports ==
=== Football ===
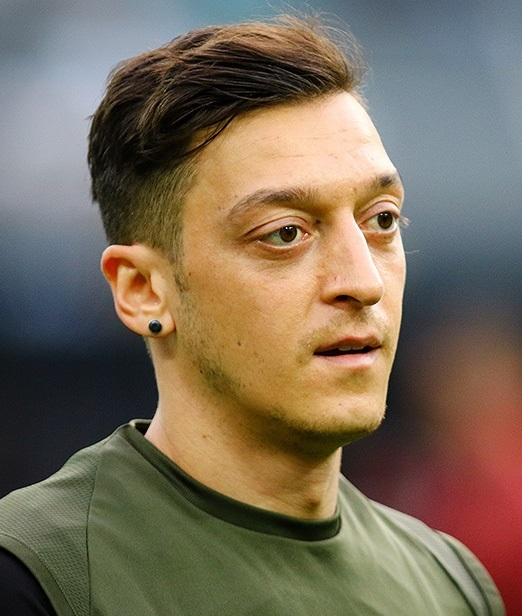
Mesut Özil played for Germany national football team

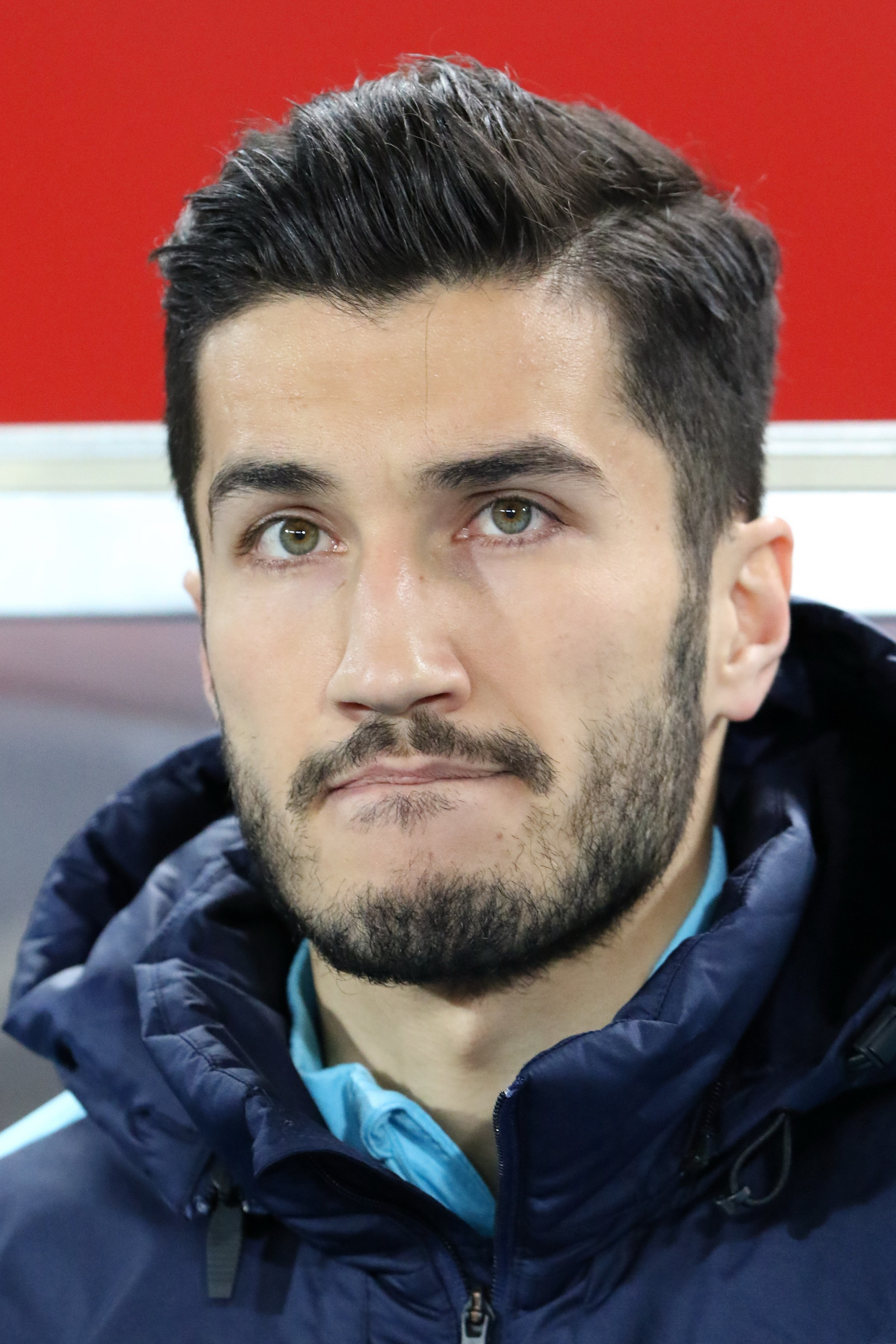
Nuri Şahin played for Turkey

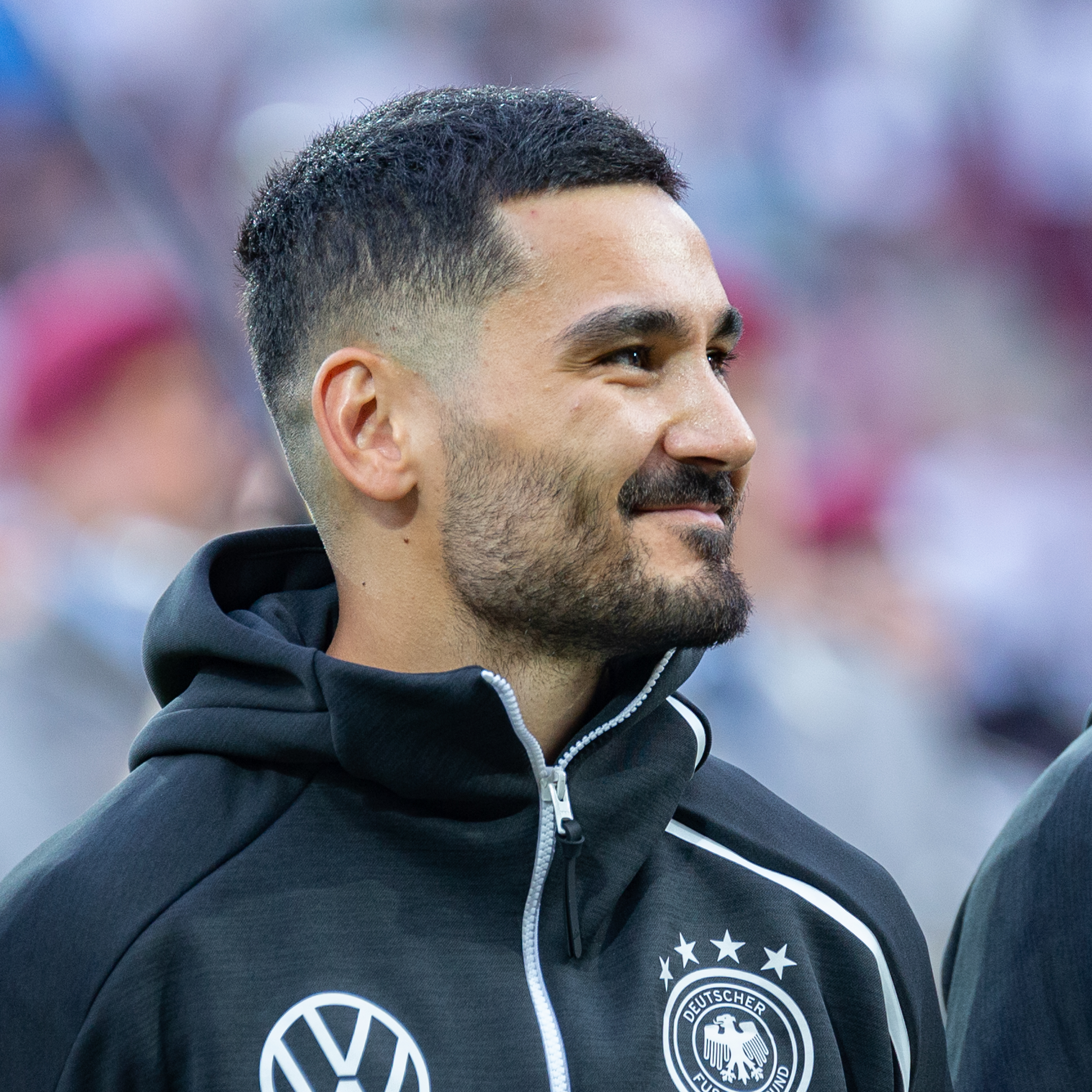
Germany national team player İlkay Gündoğan

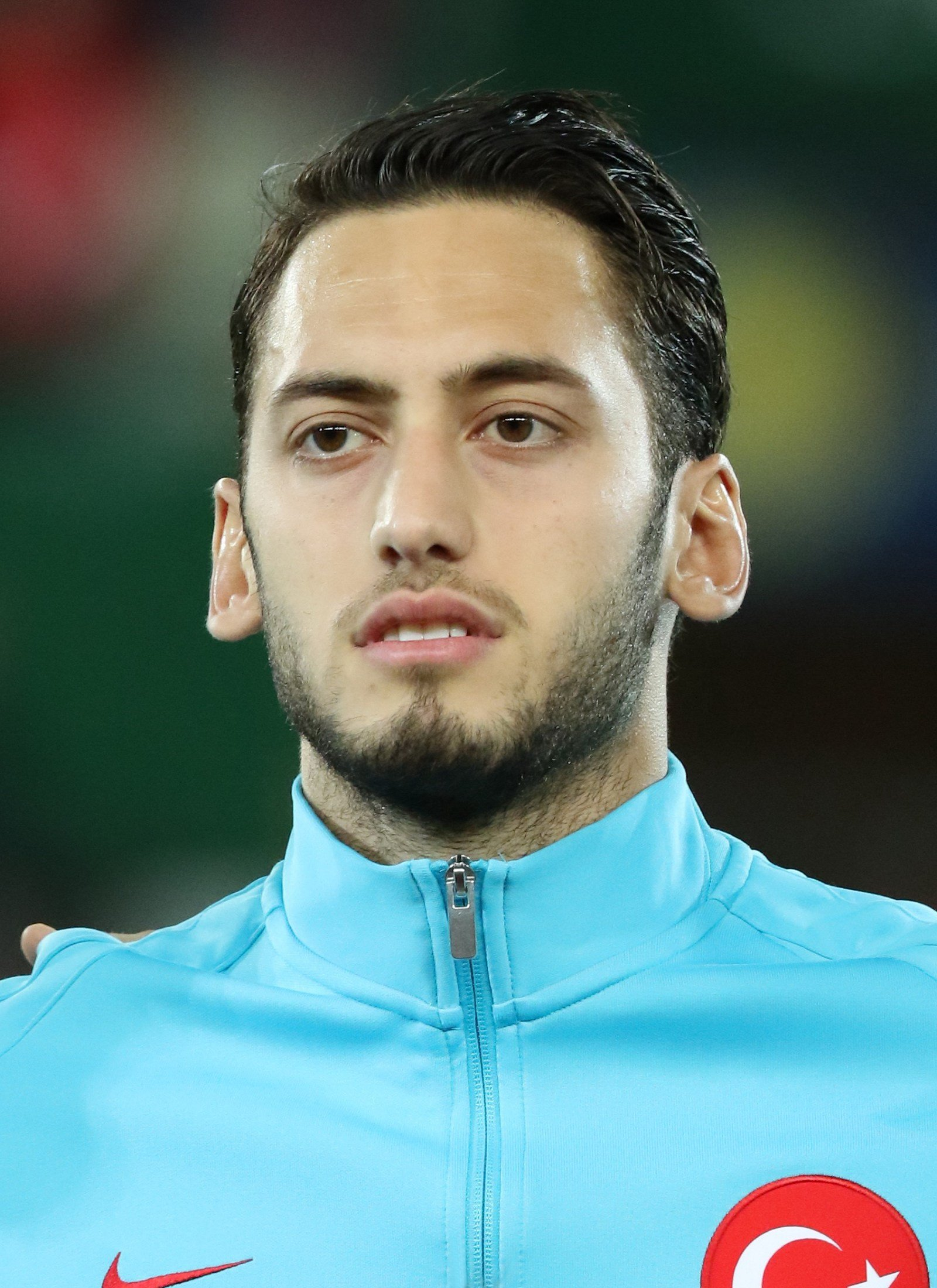
Turkey national team player Hakan Çalhanoğlu

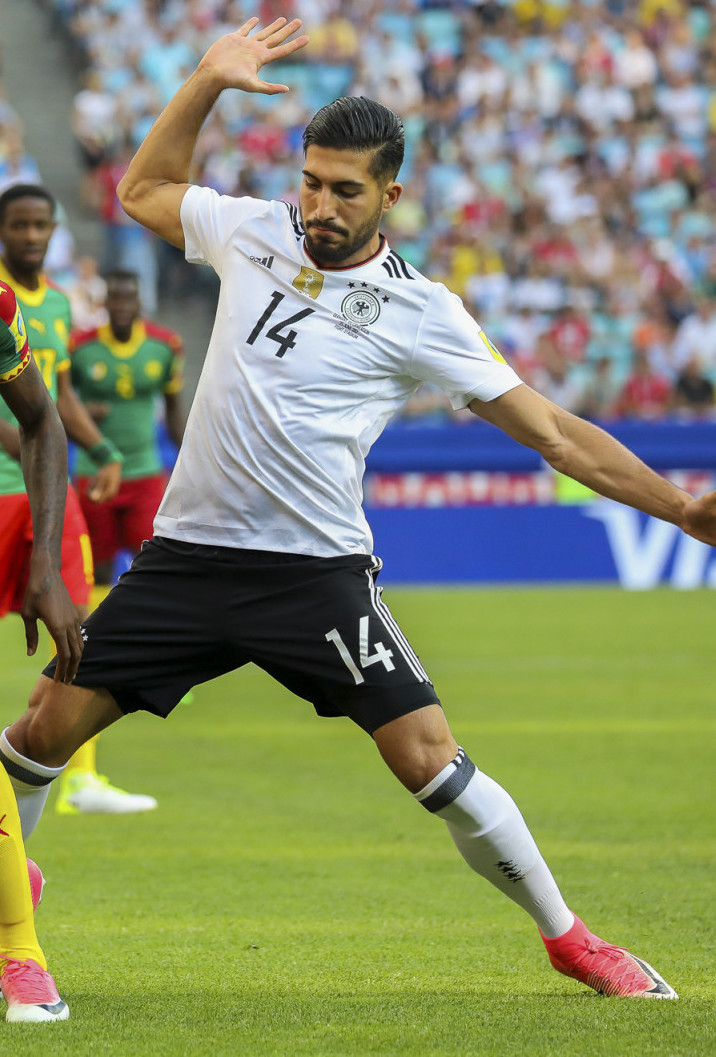
Germany national team player Emre Can

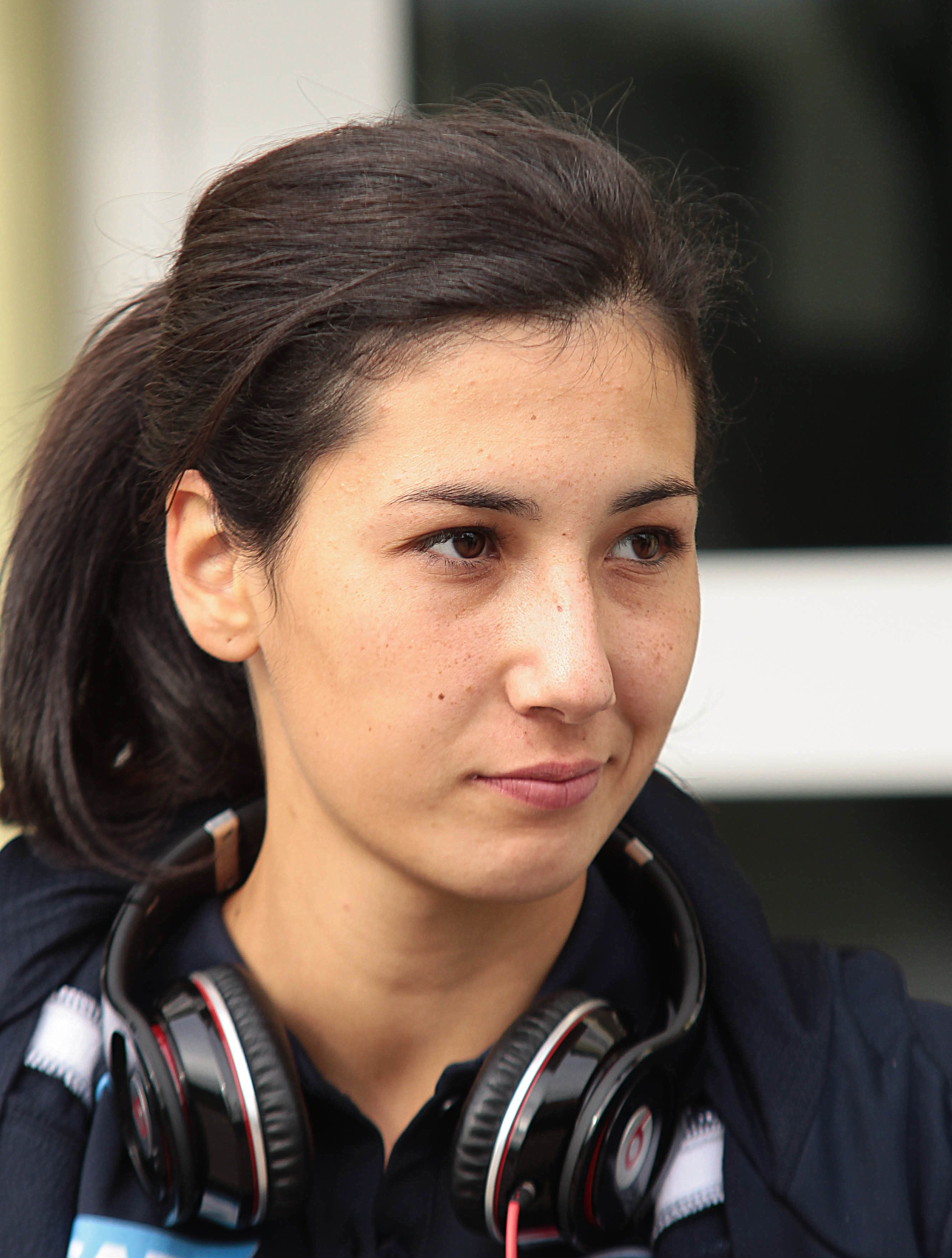
Germany national team player Sara Doorsoun

==== Men's football ====
Many football players of Turkish origin in Germany have been successful in first-division Germany and Turkey football clubs, as well as other European clubs. However, in regards to playing for national teams, many players of Turkish origin who were born in Germany have chosen to play for the Turkey national football team. Nonetheless, in recent years there has been an increase in the number of players choosing to represent Germany.

The first person of Turkish descent to play for the Germany national football team was Mehmet Scholl in 1993, followed by Mustafa Doğan in 1999 and Malik Fathi in 2006. Since the twenty-first century there has been an increase in German-born individuals of Turkish origin opting to play for Germany, including Serdar Tasci and Suat Serdar, Kerem Demirbay, Emre Can, İlkay Gündoğan, Mesut Özil,. Of those, Mesut Özil played the most matches for Germany (92 apps). His photo with Turkish president Recep Tayyip Erdoğan (together with Ilkay Gündogan and Cenk Tosun) just before the World Cup 2018 and his subsequent retirement after World Cup led to a controversy as well as political and social discussion. In his retirement statement, Özil also reported about racism experiences after his photo with Erdoğan.

Those who have chosen to retain their Turkish citizenship and who have competed for Turkey include Cenk Tosun, Ceyhun Gülselam, Gökhan Töre, Hakan Balta, Hakan Çalhanoğlu, Halil Altıntop, Hamit Altıntop, İlhan Mansız, Nuri Şahin, Ogün Temizkanoğlu, Olcay Şahan, Mehmet Ekici, Serhat Akin, Tayfun Korkut, Tayfur Havutçu, Tunay Torun, Ümit Davala, Umit Karan, Volkan Arslan, Yıldıray Baştürk, Yunus Mallı, Kaan Ayhan, Ahmed Kutucu, Levin Öztunalı, Kenan Karaman, Ömer Toprak, Salih Özcan, Nazim Sangaré, Güven Yalçın, Berkay Özcan, Hasan Ali Kaldırım and Kenan Yıldız.

Many Turkish Germans have also played for other national football teams; for example, Turkish German football players in the Azerbaijan national football team include Ufuk Budak, Tuğrul Erat, Ali Gökdemir, Taşkın İlter, Cihan Özkara, Uğur Pamuk, Fatih Şanlı, and Timur Temeltaş.

Several Turkish-German professional football players have also continued their careers as football managers such as Onur Cinel, Kenan Kocak, Hüseyin Eroğlu, Tayfun Korkut and Eddy Sözer. In addition, there are also several Turkish-German referees, including Deniz Aytekin.

==== Women's football ====
In regards to women's football, several players have chosen to play for the Turkish women's national football team, including Aylin Yaren, Aycan Yanaç, Melike Pekel, Dilan Ağgül, Selin Dişli, Arzu Karabulut, Ecem Cumert, Fatma Kara, Fatma Işık, Ebru Uzungüney and Feride Bakır.

There are also players who plays for the German women's football national football team, including Sara Doorsoun, Hasret Kayıkçı. Alara Şehitler and Selina Cerci.

==== Turkish-German football clubs ====
The Turkish community in Germany has also been active in establishing their own football clubs such as Berlin Türkspor 1965 (established in 1965) and Türkiyemspor Berlin (established in 1978). Türkiyemspor Berlin were the Champions in the Berlin-Liga in the year 2000. They were the winners of the Berliner Landespokal in 1988, 1990, and 1991. Türkgücü München, established in 1975, play in the 3. Liga.

== Politics ==
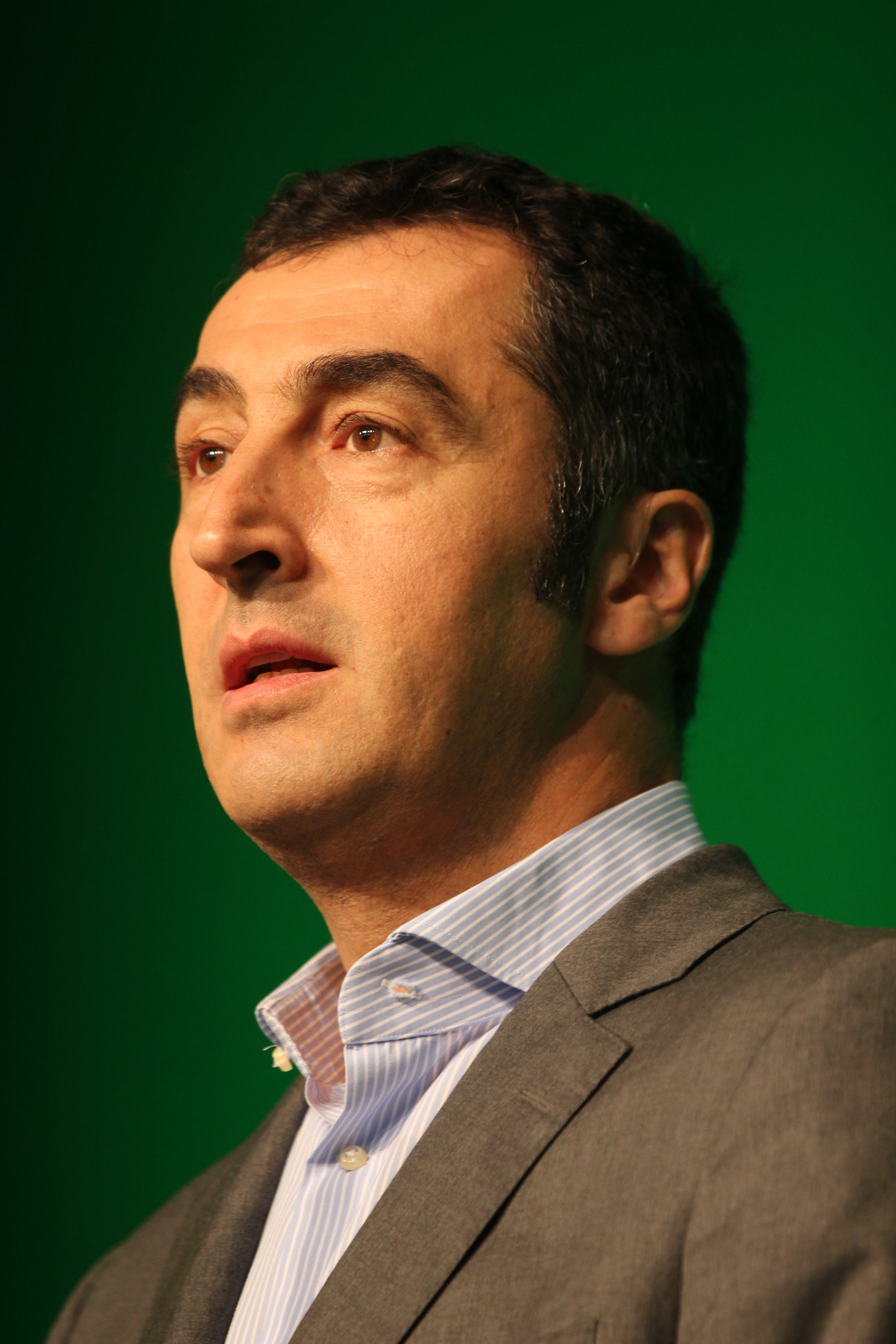
Having served as co-chair of the Alliance 90/The Greens in 2008–18, Cem Özdemir was the first party leader from an ethnic minority background.

=== German politics ===
The Turks in Germany began to be active in politics by establishing associations and federations in the 1960s and 1970s – though these were mainly based on Turkish politics rather than German politics. The first significant step towards active German politics occurred in 1987 when Sevim Çelebi became the first person of Turkish origin to be elected as an MP in the West Berlin Parliament.

With the reunification of East Germany and West Germany, unemployment in the country had increased and some political parties, particularly the Christian Democratic Union (CDU), used anti-immigration discourses as a political tool in their campaigns. To counter this, many people of Turkish origin became more politically active and began to work in local elections and in the young branches of the Social Democratic Party (SPD) and the Green Party. Several associations were founded by almost all German parties to organise meetings for Turkish voters. This played an important gateway for those who aspired to become politicians.

In 2026 Baden-Württemberg, Green party Cem Özdemir became the first Minister-President of Turkish background.

==== Federal Parliament ====
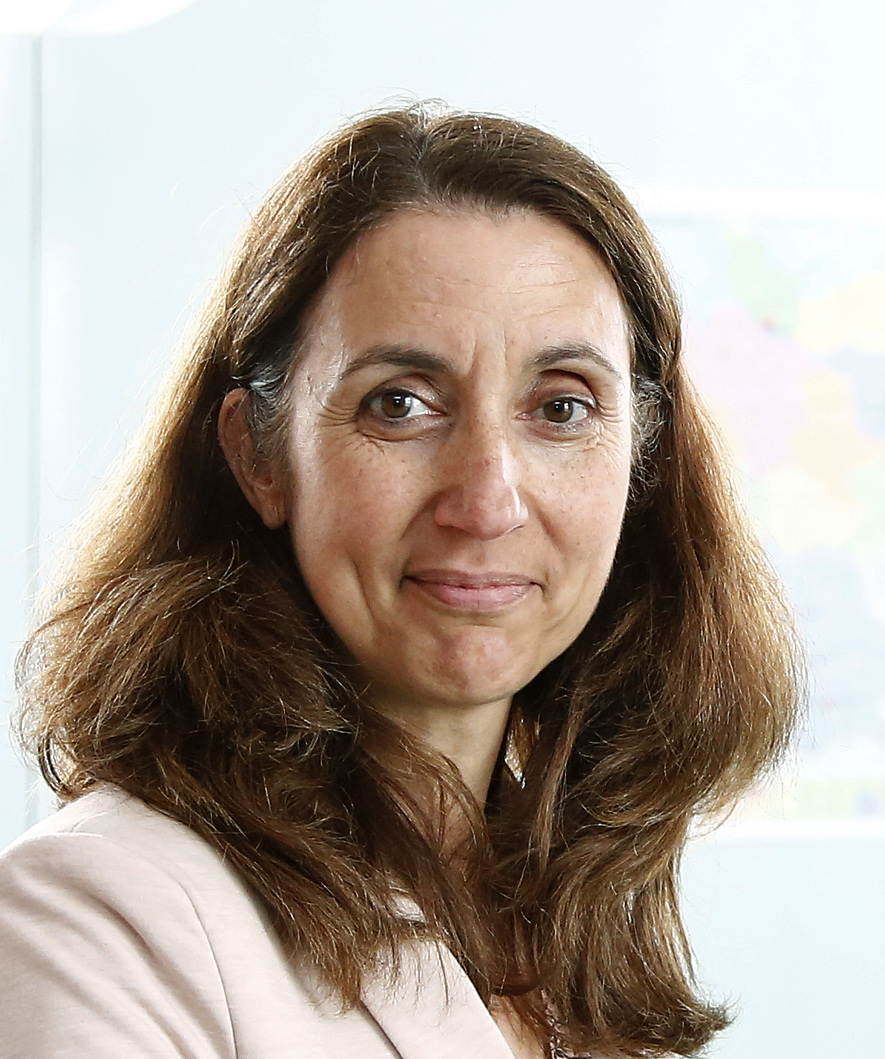
Aydan Özoğuz was the deputy chairperson of the Social Democratic Party of Germany from 2011 until 2017.

In the 1994 Leyla Onur from the SPD and Cem Özdemir from the Green Party became MPs in the Federal Parliament. They were both re-elected in the 1998 elections and were joined by Ekin Deligöz from the Green Party. Deligöz and Özdemir were both re-elected as MPs for the Greens, and Lale Akgün was elected as an MP for the SPD in the 2002 elections. Thereafter, Deligöz and Akgün were re-elected in the 2005 elections; the two female politicians were joined by Hakkı Keskin, who was elected as an MP for The Left.

By the end of the first decade of the twenty-first century, the number of German MPs of Turkish origin remained similar to that in previous elections. In the 2009 elections Ekin Deligöz and Memet Kılıç were elected for the Greens, Aydan Özoğuz for the SPD, and Serkan Tören for the FDP. Several politicians of Turkish origin subsequently became ministers or co-chairs of political parties. For example, in 2008 Cem Özdemir became co-chair of the Green Party. In 2010 Aygül Özkan was appointed Women, Family, Health and Integration Minister, becoming the first minister of Turkish origin or Muslim faith. In the same year, Aydan Özoğuz was elected deputy chairperson of the SPD. By 2011, Bilkay Öney from the SPD was appointed Integration Minister in Baden-Württemberg.

Since the 2013 German elections, MPs of Turkish origin have been elected to the Federal Parliament from four different parties. Cemile Giousouf, whose parents immigrated from Greece, became the first person of Western Thracian Turkish origin to become an MP. Giousouf was the first MP of Turkish origin and the first Muslim elected from the CDU. Five MPs of Turkish origin were elected from the SPD, including Aydan Özoğuz, Cansel Kiziltepe, Gülistan Yüksel, Metin Hakverdi and Mahmut Özdemir. Özdemir became the youngest MP in the German Parliament at the time of his election. For the Green Party, Cem Özdemir, Ekin Deligöz and Özcan Mutlu were elected as MPs, and Azize Tank for The Left.

==== European Parliament ====
In 1989 Leyla Onur from the SPD party was the first person of Turkish-origin to be a member of the European Parliament for Germany. By 2004 Cem Özdemir and Vural Öger also became members of the European Parliament. Since then, Ismail Ertug was elected as a Member of the European Parliament in 2009 and was re-elected in 2014.

==== Turkish-German political parties ====
Political parties in Germany	Year established	Founders	Current Leader	Position	Ideologies
Alternative for Migrants (German: Alternative für Migranten, AfM; Turkish: Göçmenler için Alternatif)	2019				Turkish and Muslim minority interests
Alliance for Innovation and Justice (German: Bündnis für Innovation und Gerechtigkeit, BIG; Turkish: Yenilik ve Adalet Birliği Partisi)	2010	Haluk Yıldız	Haluk Yıldız		Turkish and Muslim minority interests
Alliance of German Democrats (German: Allianz Deutscher Demokraten, ADD; Turkish: Alman Demokratlar İttifakı)	26 June 2016	Remzi Aru	Ramazan Akbaş		Turkish and Muslim minority interests, Conservatism
Bremen Integration Party of Germany (German: Bremische Integrations-Partei Deutschlands, BIP; Turkish: Almanya Bremen Entegrasyon Partisi)	2010		Levet Albayrak		Turkish and Muslim minority interests

=== Turkish politics ===
Some Turks born or raised in Germany have entered Turkish politics. For example, Siegen-born, Justice and Development Party (AKP) affiliated Akif Çağatay Kılıç has been the Minister of Youth and Sports of Turkey since 2013.

Germany is effectively Turkey's 4th largest electoral district. Around a third of this constituency vote in Turkish elections (570,000 in the 2015 parliamentary elections), and the share of conservative votes for the Justice and Development Party (AKP) and Recep Tayyip Erdoğan is even higher than in Turkey itself.

Following the 2016 Turkish coup d'état attempt, huge pro-Erdoğan demonstrations were held by Turkish citizens in German cities. The Economist suggested that this would make it difficult for Germany politicians to criticize Erdoğan's policies and tactics. However, equally huge demonstrations by Turkish Kurds were also held in Germany some weeks later against Erdoğan's 2016 Turkish purges and against the detention the HDP party co-chairpersons Selahattin Demirtaş and Figen Yüksekdağ in Turkey.

== Notable people ==
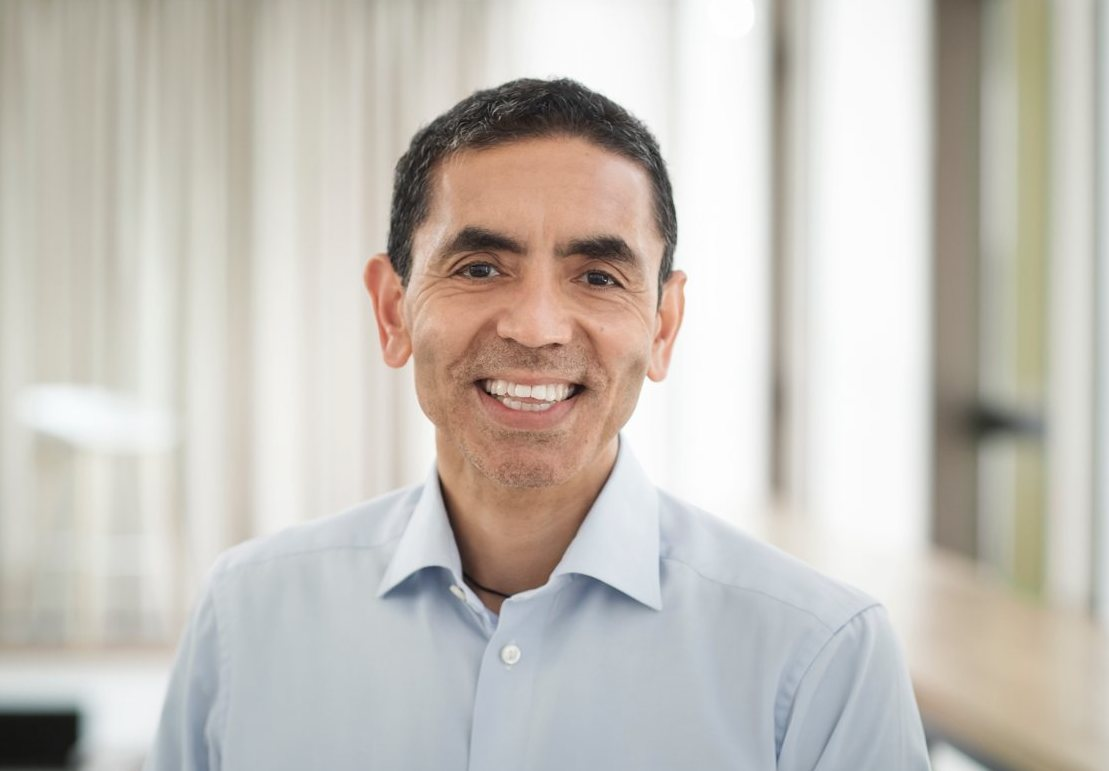
Uğur Şahin immigrated to Germany at the age of four. In 2020, Şahin, alongside his Turkish-German wife Özlem Türeci, developed the Pfizer-BioNTech COVID-19 vaccine and became the first people of Turkish origin to be included in the hundred wealthiest people list in Germany.

== See also ==
- List of Turkish Germans
- List of German locations named after people and places of Turkish origin
- Turks in Berlin
- Germany–Turkey relations
- Turkish diaspora
  - Turks in Europe
    - Turks in Austria
    - Turks in France
    - Turks in the Netherlands
    - Turks in Liechtenstein
    - Turks in Poland
    - Turks in Russia
    - Turks in Sweden
    - Turks in Switzerland
    - Turks in the United Kingdom
  - Turkish Americans

== Bibliography ==
- Abel, Marco (2012), "The Minor Cinema of Thomas Arslan: A Prolegomenon", in Hake, Sabine; Mennel, Barbara (eds.), Turkish German Cinema in the New Millennium: Sites, Sounds, and Screens, Berghahn Books, ISBN 978-0857457691
- Ahmed, Akbar S. (1998), Islam Today: A Short Introduction to the Muslim World, I.B.Tauris, ISBN 978-0857713803
- Akgönül, Samim (2013), The Minority Concept in the Turkish Context: Practices and Perceptions in Turkey, Greece and France, BRILL, ISBN 978-9004222113
- Aktürk, Şener (2010), "The Turkish Minority in German Politics: Trends, Diversification of Representation, and Policy Implications", Insight Turkey, 12 (1)
- Alkin, Ömer (2015), ""Rewriting" Turkish-German cinema from the bottom-up: Turkish emigration cinema", in Şeker, Betül Dilara; Çağlar, Ali (eds.), Turkish Migration, Identity and Integration, Transnational Press, ISBN 978-1910781128
- Audretsch, David B.; Lehmann, Erik E. (2016), The Seven Secrets of Germany: Economic Resilience in an Era of Global Turbulence, Oxford University Press, ISBN 978-0190258696
- Barbieri, William (1998), Ethics of Citizenship: Immigration and Group Rights in Germany, Duke University Press, ISBN 978-0-8223-2071-5
- Berghahn, Daniela (2011), ""Seeing everything with different eyes": the diasporic optic of Fatih Akin's Head-On (2004)", in Cooke, Paul; Homewood, Chris (eds.), New Directions in German Cinema, I.B.Tauris, ISBN 978-0857720399
- Byrnes, Timothy; Katzenstein, Peter (2006), Religion in an Expanding Europe, Cambridge University Press, ISBN 978-0-521-85926-4
- Conradt, David P.; Langenbacher, Eric (2013), The German Polity, Rowman & Littlefield Publishers, ISBN 978-1442216464
- Curtis, Michael (2013), Jews, Antisemitism, and the Middle East, Transaction Publishers, ISBN 978-1412851411
- Darke, Diana (2014), Eastern Turkey, Bradt Travel Guides, ISBN 978-1841624907
- Dönmez-Colin, Gönül (2008), Turkish Cinema: Identity, Distance and Belonging, Reaktion Books, ISBN 978-1861895837
- Esposito, John; Burgat, François (2003), Modernizing Islam: Religion in the Public Sphere in the Middle East and Europe, C. Hurst & Co. Publishers, ISBN 978-1-85065-678-4
- Faas, Daniel (2016), "Muslims in Germany: from guest workers to citizens?", in Triandafyllidou, Anna (ed.), Muslims in 21st Century Europe: Structural and Cultural Perspectives, Routledge, ISBN 978-1134004454
- Feltes, Thomas; Marquardt, Uwe; Schwarz, Stefan (2013), "Policing in Germany: Developments in the Last 20 Years", in Mesko, Gorazd; Fields, Charles B.; Lobnikar, Branko; Sotlar, Andrej (eds.), Handbook on Policing in Central and Eastern Europe, Springer, ISBN 978-1461467205
- Fernández-Kelly, Patricia (2015), "Assimilation through Transnationalism: A Theoretical Synthesis", in Portes, Alejandro; Fernández-Kelly, Patricia (eds.), The State and the Grassroots: Immigrant Transnational Organizations in Four Continents, Berghahn Books, ISBN 978-1782387350
- Findley, Carter (2005), The Turks in World History, Oxford University Press US, ISBN 978-0-19-517726-8
- Fischer, Tristan (2015), History Future Now, Lulu Press, ISBN 978-1329707467
- Gogolin, Ingrid (2002), Linguistic Diversity and New Minorities in Europe (PDF), coe.int
- Guentcheva, Rossitza; Kabakchieva, Petya; Kolarski, Plamen (September 2003), Migrant Trends in Selected Applicant Countries, VOLUME I – Bulgaria: The social impact of seasonal migration (PDF), Vienna, Austria: International Organization for Migration, archived from the original (PDF) on 30 September 2018
- Gülçiçek, Ali Riza (2006), The Turkish presence in Europe: Migrant Workers and New European Citizens (PDF), Parliamentary Assembly, archived from the original (PDF) on 1 April 2009
- Güney, Serhat; Pekman, Cem; Kabas, Bulent (2014), "Diasporic Music in Transition: Turkish Immigrant Performers on the Stage of "Multikulti" Berlin", Popular Music and Society, 37 (2): 132–151, doi:10.1080/03007766.2012.736288, S2CID 146964549
- Hake, Sabine; Mennel, Barbara (2012), "Introduction", in Hake, Sabine; Mennel, Barbara (eds.), Turkish German Cinema in the New Millennium: Sites, Sounds, and Screens, Berghahn Books, pp. 1–18, ISBN 978-0857457691
- Hanlon, Bernadette; Vicino, Thomas J. (2014), Global Migration: The Basics, Routledge, ISBN 978-1134696871
- Heine, Peter; Syed, Aslam (2005), Muslimische Philanthropie und bürgerschaftliches Engagement, Maecenata Verlag, ISBN 978-3-935975-40-7
- Heinzelmann, Ursula (2008), Food Culture in Germany, ABC-CLIO, ISBN 978-0313344954
- Hohmuth, Jürgen (2003), Dresden Heute, Prestel, ISBN 978-3791328607
- Horrocks, David; Kolinsky, Eva (1996), Turkish Culture in German Society Today (Culture & Society in Germany), Berghahn Books, ISBN 978-1-57181-047-2
- Hunter, Shireen (2002), Islam, Europe's Second Religion: The New Social, Cultural, and Political Landscape, Greenwood Publishing Group, ISBN 978-0-275-97608-8
- Inda, Jonathan; Rosaldo, Renato (2008), The Anthropology of Globalization: A Reader, Wiley-Blackwell, ISBN 978-1-4051-3612-9
- Ivanov, Zhivko (2007), "Economic Satisfaction and Nostalgic Laments: The Language of Bulgarian Economic Migrants After 1989 in Websites and Electronic Fora", in Gupta, Suman; Omoniyi, Tope (eds.), The Cultures of Economic Migration: International Perspectives, Ashgate Publishing, ISBN 978-0-7546-7070-4
- Jerome, Roy; Kimmel, Michael (2001), Conceptions of Postwar German Masculinity, State University of New York Press, ISBN 978-0-7914-4937-0
- Karanfil, Gökçen; Şavk, Serkan (2014), "An Introduction from the Editors", in Karanfil, Gökçen; Şavk, Serkan (eds.), Imaginaries Out of Place: Cinema, Transnationalism and Turkey, Cambridge Scholars Publishing, ISBN 978-1443868600
- Kastoryano, Riva; Harshav, Barbara (2002), Negotiating Identities: States and Immigrants in France and Germany, Princeton University Press, ISBN 978-0-691-01015-1
- Kautny, Oliver (2013), "Immigrant Hip-Hop in Germany: The Cultural Identities of Migrants", in Nitzsche, Sina A.; Grünzweig, Walter (eds.), Hip-Hop in Europe, LIT Verlag Münster, ISBN 978-3643904133
- Kirschner, Luz Angelica (2015), "Human Rights and Minority Rights: Argentine and German Perspectives", in McClennen, Sophia A.; Moore, Alexandra Schultheis (eds.), The Routledge Companion to Literature and Human Rights, Routledge, ISBN 978-1317696285
- Kötter, I; Vonthein, R; Günaydin, I; Müller, C; Kanz, L; Zierhut, M; Stübiger, N (2003), "Behçet's Disease in Patients of German and Turkish Origin- A Comparative Study", in Zouboulis, Christos (ed.), Advances in Experimental Medicine and Biology, Volume 528, Springer, ISBN 978-0-306-47757-7
- Legge, Jerome (2003), Jews, Turks, and other Strangers: The Roots of Prejudice in Modern Germany, University of Wisconsin Press, ISBN 978-0-299-18400-1
- Lucassen, Leo (2005), The Immigrant Threat: The Integration of Old and New Migrants in Western Europe Since 1850, University of Illinois Press, ISBN 978-0-252-03046-8
- Maeva, Mila (2007), "Modern Migration waves of Bulgarian Turks", in Marushiakova, Elena (ed.), Dynamics of National Identity and Transnational Identities in the Process of European Integration, Cambridge Scholar Publishing, ISBN 978-1847184719
- Maeva, Mancheva (2011), "Practicing Identities Across Borders: The Case of Bulgarian Turkish Labor Migrants in Germany", in Eade, John; Smith, Michael Peter (eds.), Transnational Ties: Cities, Migrations, and Identities, Transaction Publishers, ISBN 978-1412840361
- Markova, Eugenia (2010), "Optimising migration effects: A perspective from Bulgaria", in Black, Richard; Engbersen, Godfried; Okolski, Marek; et al. (eds.), A Continent Moving West?: EU Enlargement and Labour Migration from Central and Eastern Europe, Amsterdam University Press, ISBN 978-90-8964-156-4
- Markovic, Nina; Yasmeen, Samina (2016), "Engaging Europe's Muslims: The European Union and Muslim Migrants during Eurozone Crisis", in Yasmeen, Samina; Markovic, Nina (eds.), Muslim Citizens in the West: Spaces and Agents of Inclusion and Exclusion, Routledge, ISBN 978-1317091219
- Mickolus, Edward (2014), Terrorism, 2008-2012: A Worldwide Chronology, McFarland & Company Publishers, ISBN 978-0786477630
- Mitchell, Don (2000), Cultural Geography: A Critical Introduction, Wiley-Blackwell, ISBN 978-1-55786-892-3
- Moch, Leslie (2003), Moving Europeans: Migration in Western Europe Since 1650, Indiana University Press, ISBN 978-0-253-21595-6
- Nathans, Eli (2004), The Politics of Citizenship in Germany: Ethnicity, Utility and Nationalism, Berg Publishers, ISBN 978-1-85973-781-1
- Nielsen, Jørgen (2004), Muslims in Western Europe, Edinburgh University Press, ISBN 978-0-7486-1844-6
- Özsari, Hülya (2010), "Der Türke": die Konstruktion des Fremden in den Medien, Technische Universität Berlin, ISBN 978-3798322080
- Peterson, Brent (2012), "Turkish for Beginner: Teaching Cosmopolitanism to Germans", in Hake, Sabine; Mennel, Barbara (eds.), Turkish German Cinema in the New Millennium: Sites, Sounds, and Screens, Berghahn Books, ISBN 978-0857457691
- Pusch, Barbara (2016), "Legal membership on the Turkish side of the transnational German-Turkish space", in Sirkeci, Ibrahim; Pusch, Barbara (eds.), Turkish Migration Policy, Transnational Press, ISBN 978-1910781173
- Rizvi, Kishwar (2015), The Transnational Mosque: Architecture and Historical Memory in the Contemporary Middle East, University of North Carolina Press, ISBN 978-1469621173
- Rosenow-Williams, Kerstin (2012), Organizing Muslims and Integrating Islam in Germany: New Developments in the 21st Century, BRILL, ISBN 978-9004230552
- Sakman, Tolga (2015), "Turks in German political life: Effects of Turkish origin politicians to integration", in Sirkeci, Ibrahim; Şeker, Güven; Tilbe, Ali; Ökmen, Mustafa; Yazgan, Pınar; Eroğlu, Deniz (eds.), Turkish Migration Conference 2015 Selected Proceedings, Transnational Press, ISBN 978-1910781012
- Spielhaus, Riem (2013), "Cliches are funny as long as they happen on stage: comedy as political criticism", in Nielsen, Jørgen S. (ed.), Muslim Political Participation in Europe, Edinburgh University Press, ISBN 978-0748646944
- Stowasser, Barbara Freyer (2002), "The Turks in German: From Sojourners to Citizens", in Haddad, Yvonne Yazbeck (ed.), Muslims in the West: From Sojourners to Citizens, Oxford University Press, ISBN 978-0198033752
- Tan, Dursun; Hans-Peter, Waldhoff (1996), "Turkish Everyday Culture in Germany and its Prospects", in Horrocks, David; Kolinsky, Eva (eds.), Turkish Culture in German Society Today, Berghahn Books, ISBN 978-1-57181-047-2
- Taras, Ray (2012), Xenophobia and Islamophobia in Europe, Edinburgh University Press, ISBN 978-0748650712
- Taras, Raymond (2015), ""Islamophobia never stands still": race, religion, and culture", in Nasar, Meer (ed.), Racialization and Religion: Race, Culture and Difference in the Study of Antisemitism and Islamophobia, Routledge, ISBN 978-1317432449
- Temel, Bülent (2013), "Candidacy versus Membership: Is Turkey the Greatest Beneficiary of the European Union?", The Great Catalyst: European Union Project and Lessons from Greece and Turkey, Lexington Books, ISBN 978-0739174494
- Volkan, Vamik D. (2014), Enemies on the Couch: A Psychopolitical Journey Through War and Peace, Pitchstone Publishing, ISBN 978-1939578112
- Weaver-Hightower, Rebecca (2014), "Introduction", in Weaver-Hightower, Rebecca; Hulme, Peter (eds.), Postcolonial Film: History, Empire, Resistance, Routledge, ISBN 978-1134747276
- Westerlund, David; Svanberg, Ingvar (1999), Islam Outside the Arab World, Palgrave Macmillan, ISBN 978-0-312-22691-6
- Whitman, Lois (1990), Destroying Ethnic Identity: The Turks of Greece, Human Rights Watch, ISBN 978-0929692708
- Wilson, Peter (2002), German Armies: War and German Society, 1648-1806, Routledge, ISBN 978-1135370534
- Wilson, Peter H. (2016), Heart of Europe: A History of the Holy Roman Empire, Harvard University Press, ISBN 978-0674058095
- Yeşilada, Karin E. (2008), "Turkish-German Screen Power – The Impact of Young Turkish Immigrants on German TV and Film", GFL, 1: 73–99
- Yurdakul, Gökce (2009), From Guestworkers into Muslims: The Transformation of Turkish Immigrant Associations in Germany, Cambridge Scholars Press, ISBN 978-1-4438-0423-3
