= List of Turkish German actors =

The following is a list of notable Turkish German actors and actresses. This includes people of full or partial ethnic Turkish origin born in Germany, as well as ethnic Turkish immigrants who have arrived in Germany either from the Seljuk and Ottoman territories or from post-Ottoman modern nation-states (especially from the Republic of Turkey, but also from the Balkans, Cyprus, as well as other parts of the Levant and North Africa).

See List of Turkish Germans for other Turkish Germans.

== Actors and actresses ==
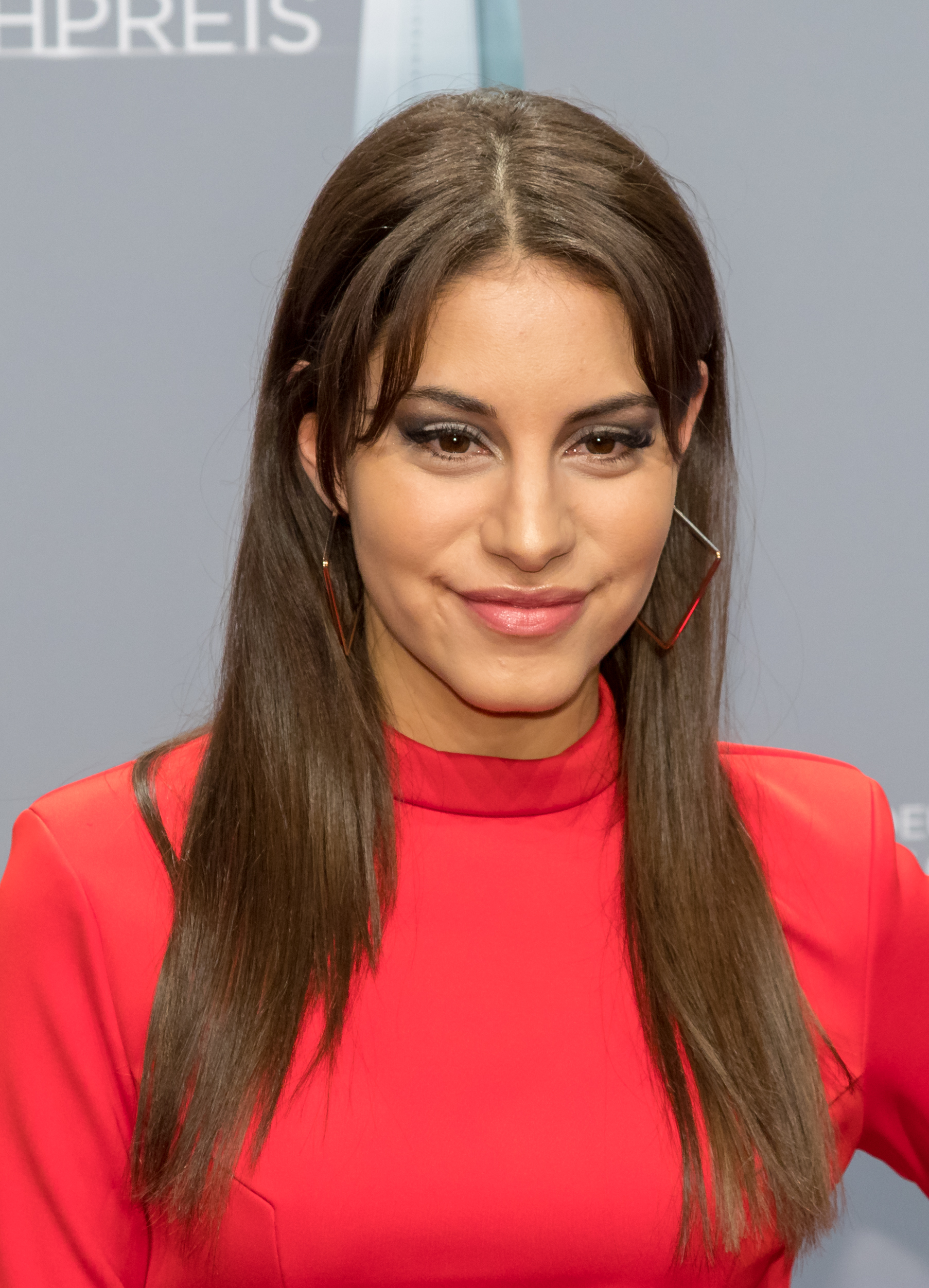
Almila Bagriacik

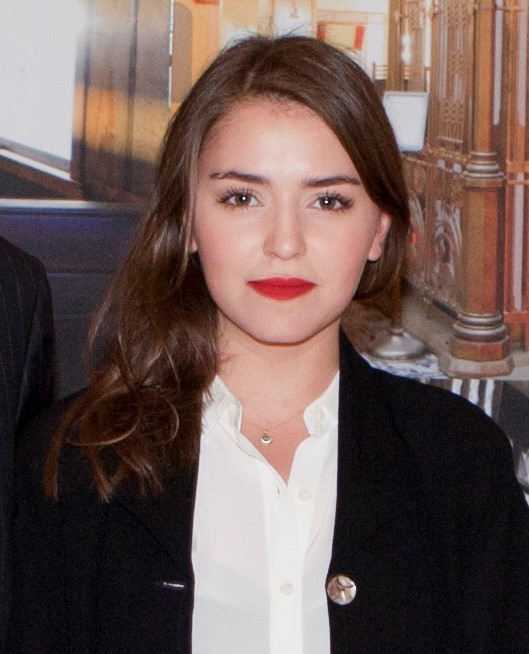
Ava Celik

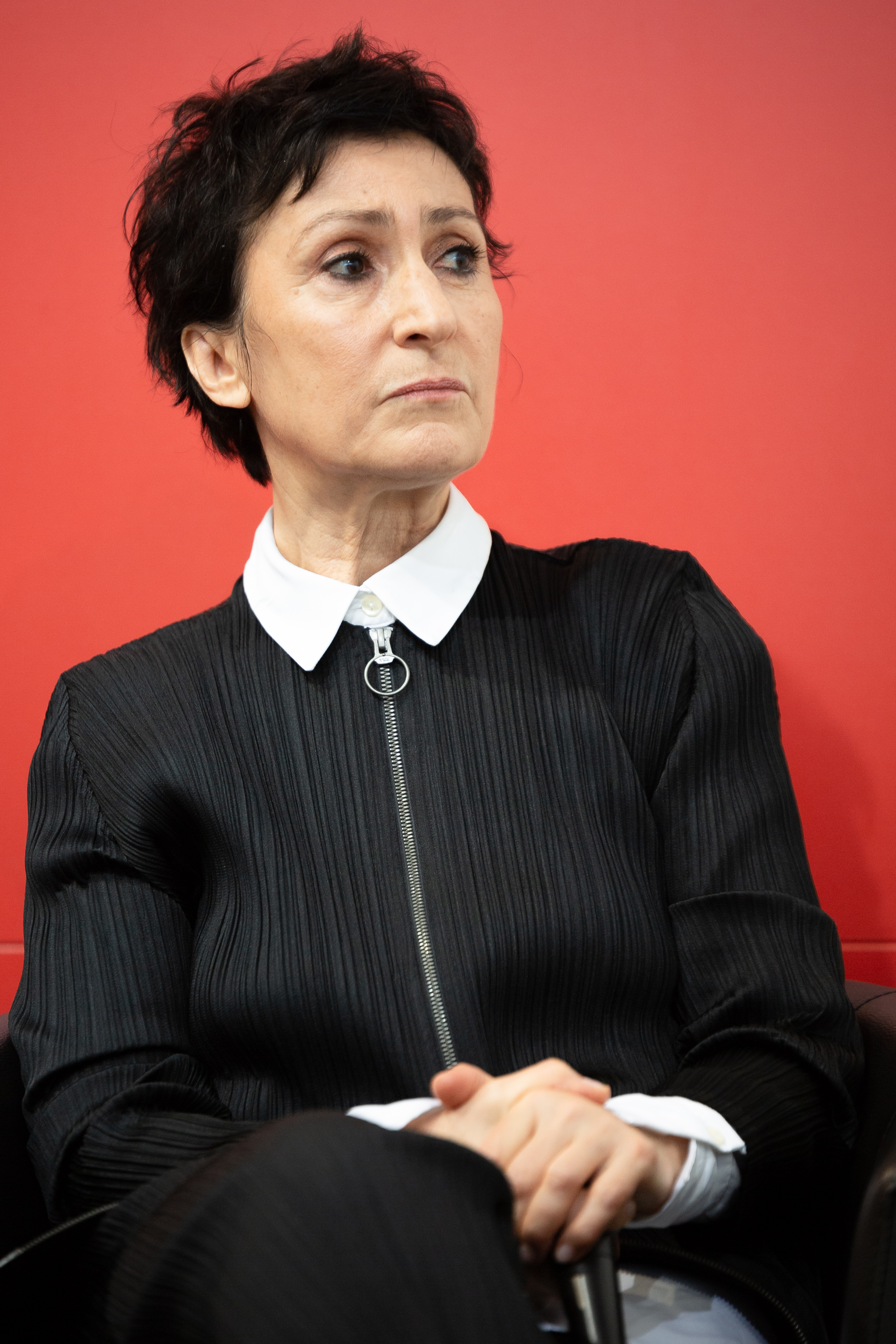
Renan Demirkan

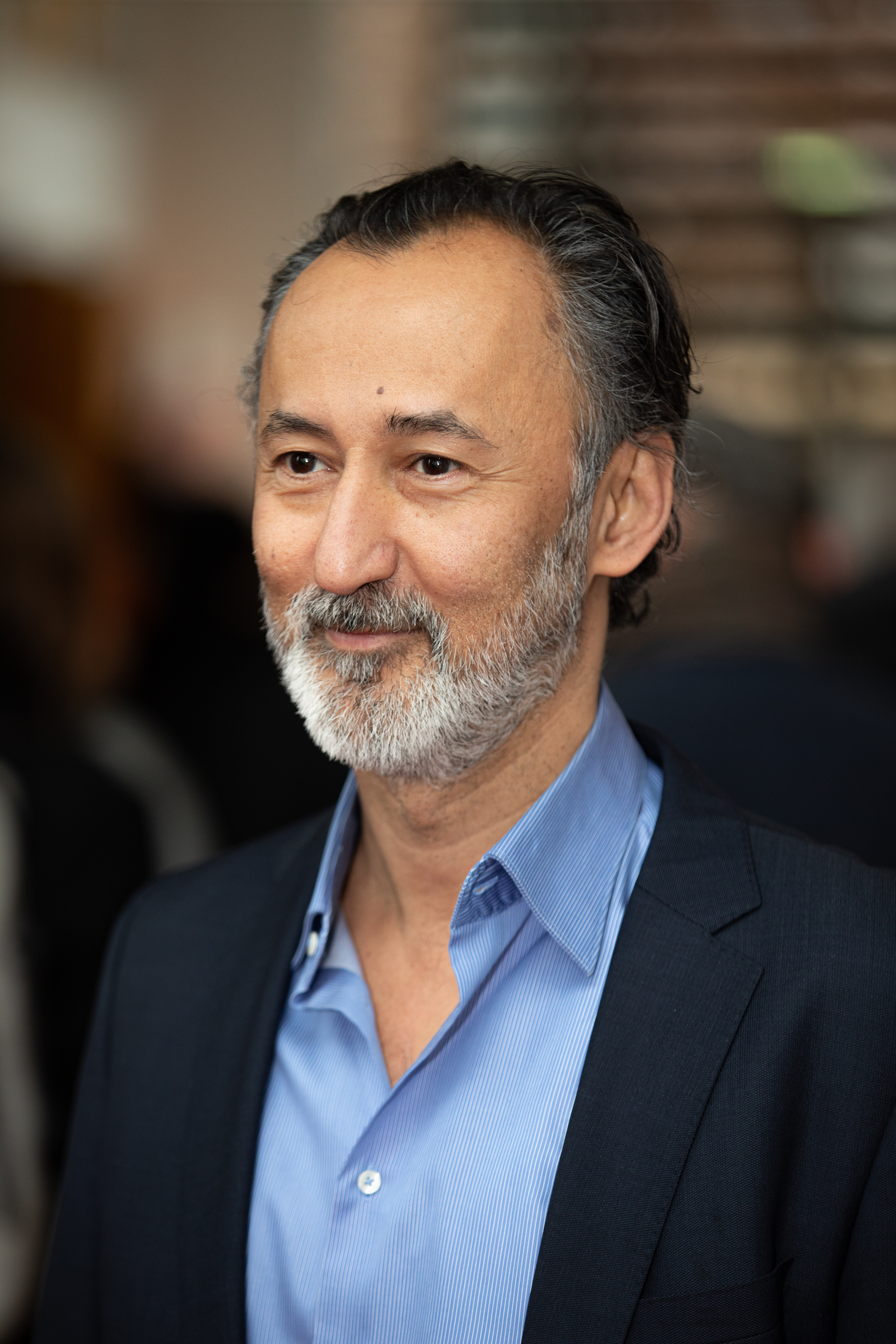
Ercan Durmaz

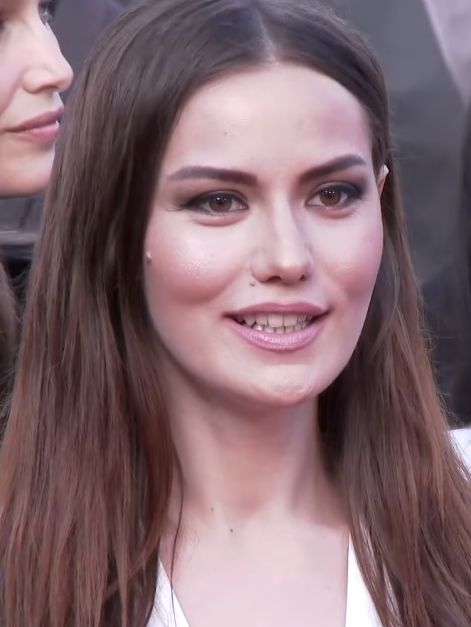
Fahriye Evcen

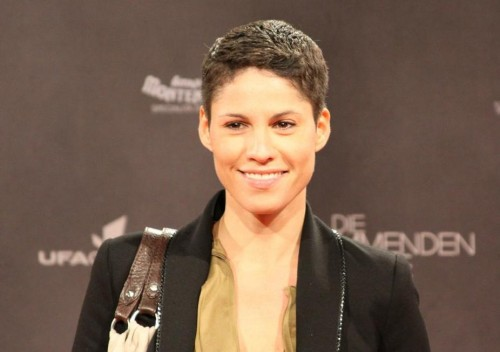
Jasmin Gerat

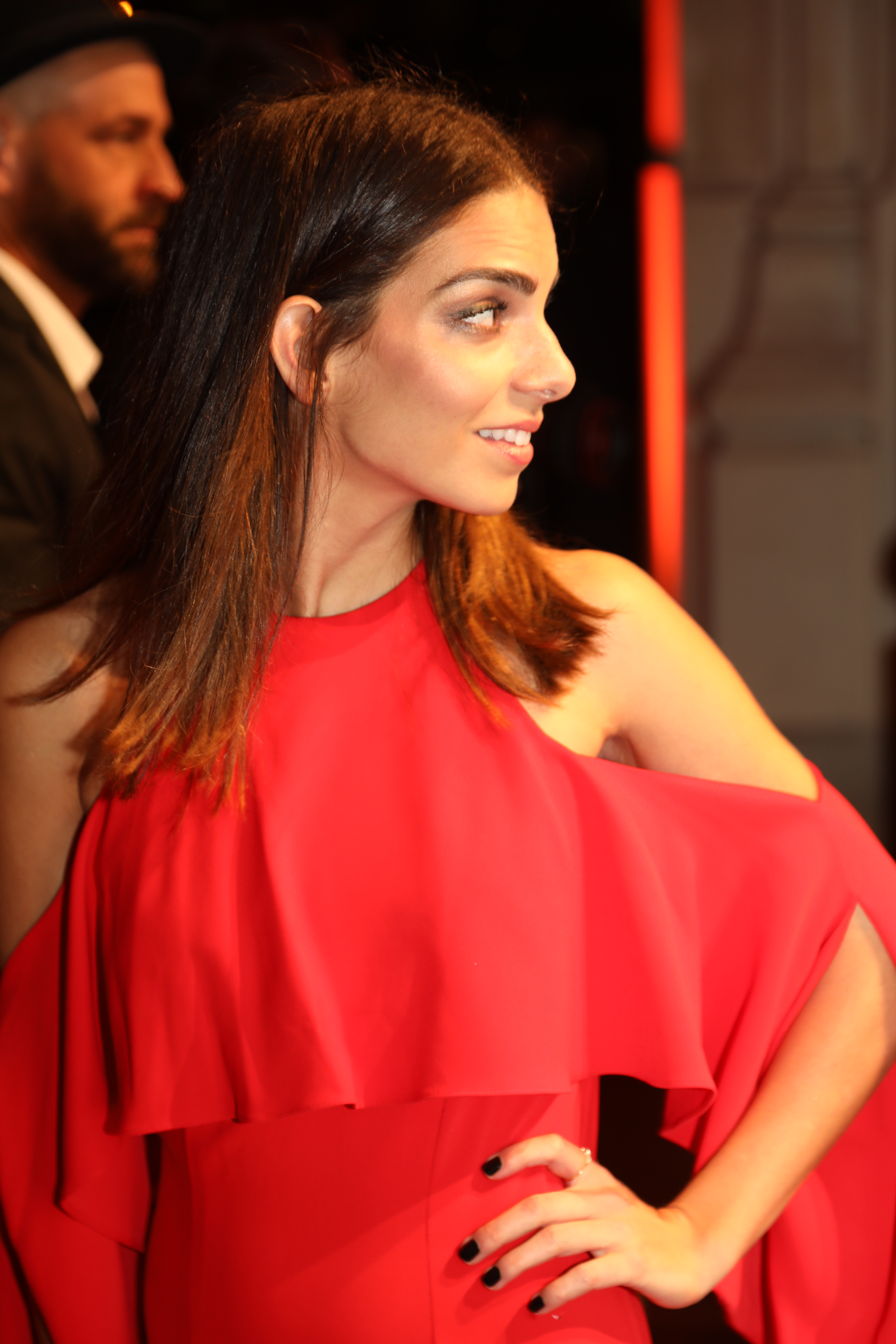
Lilli Hollunder

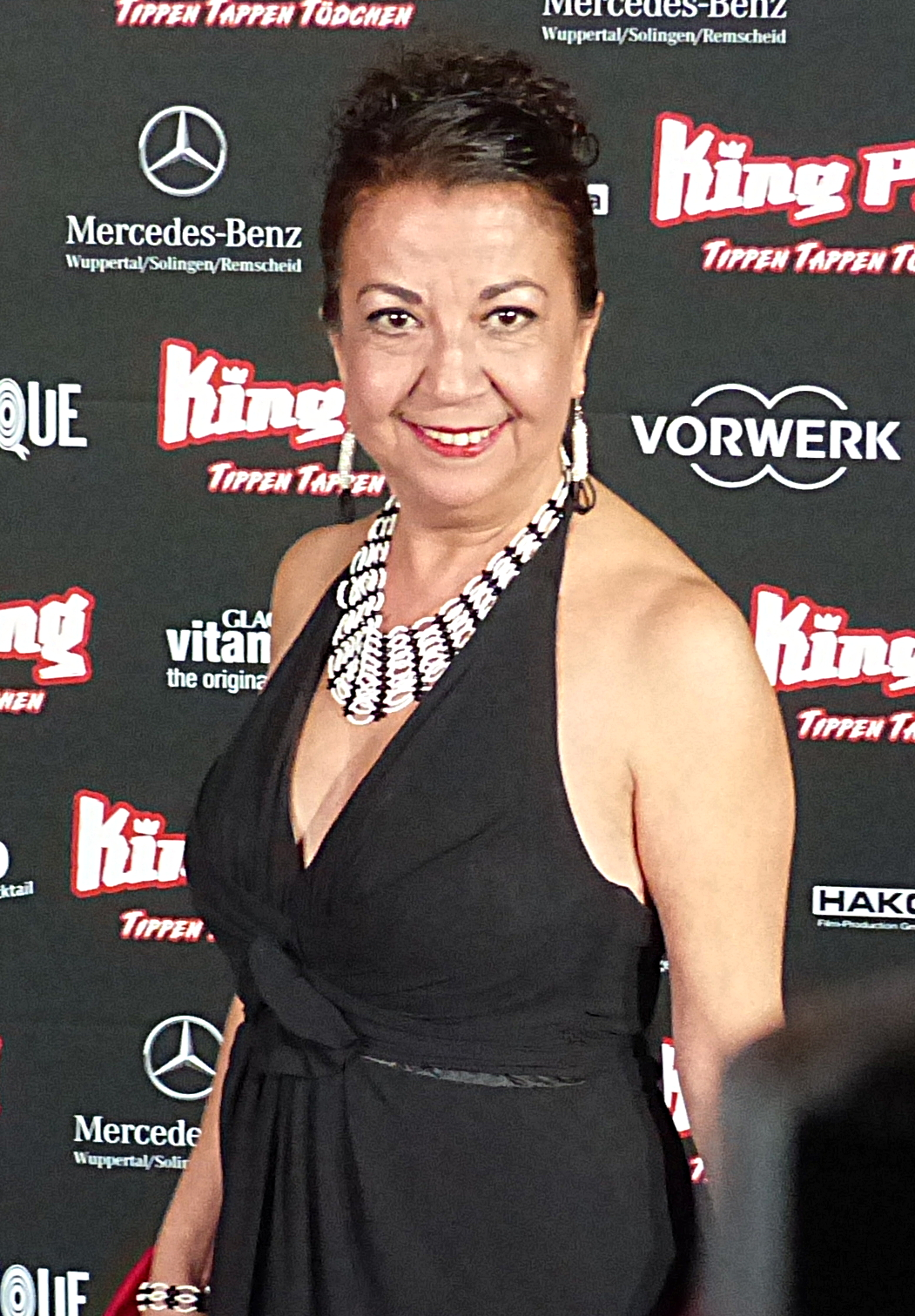
Lilay Huser

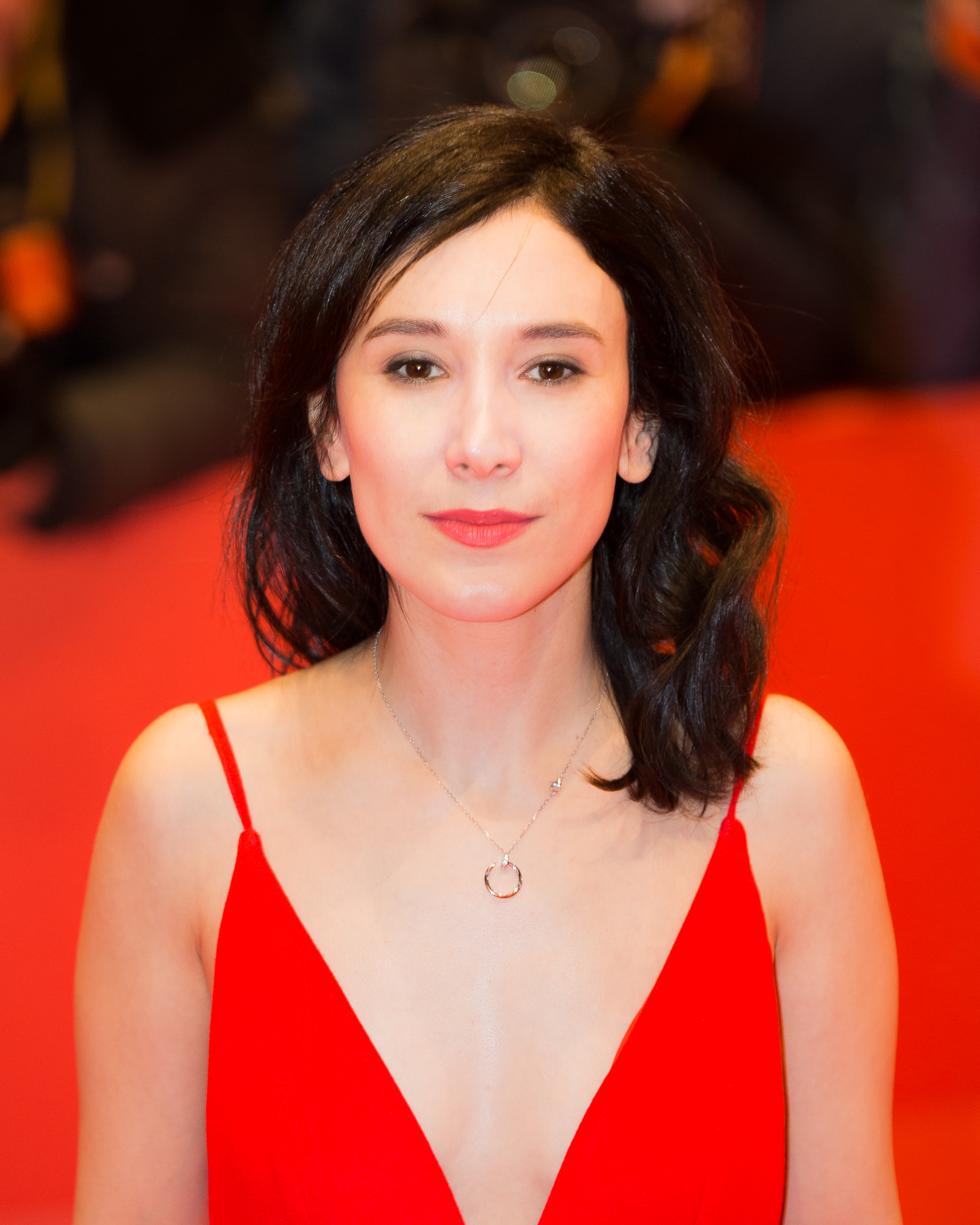
Sibel Kekilli

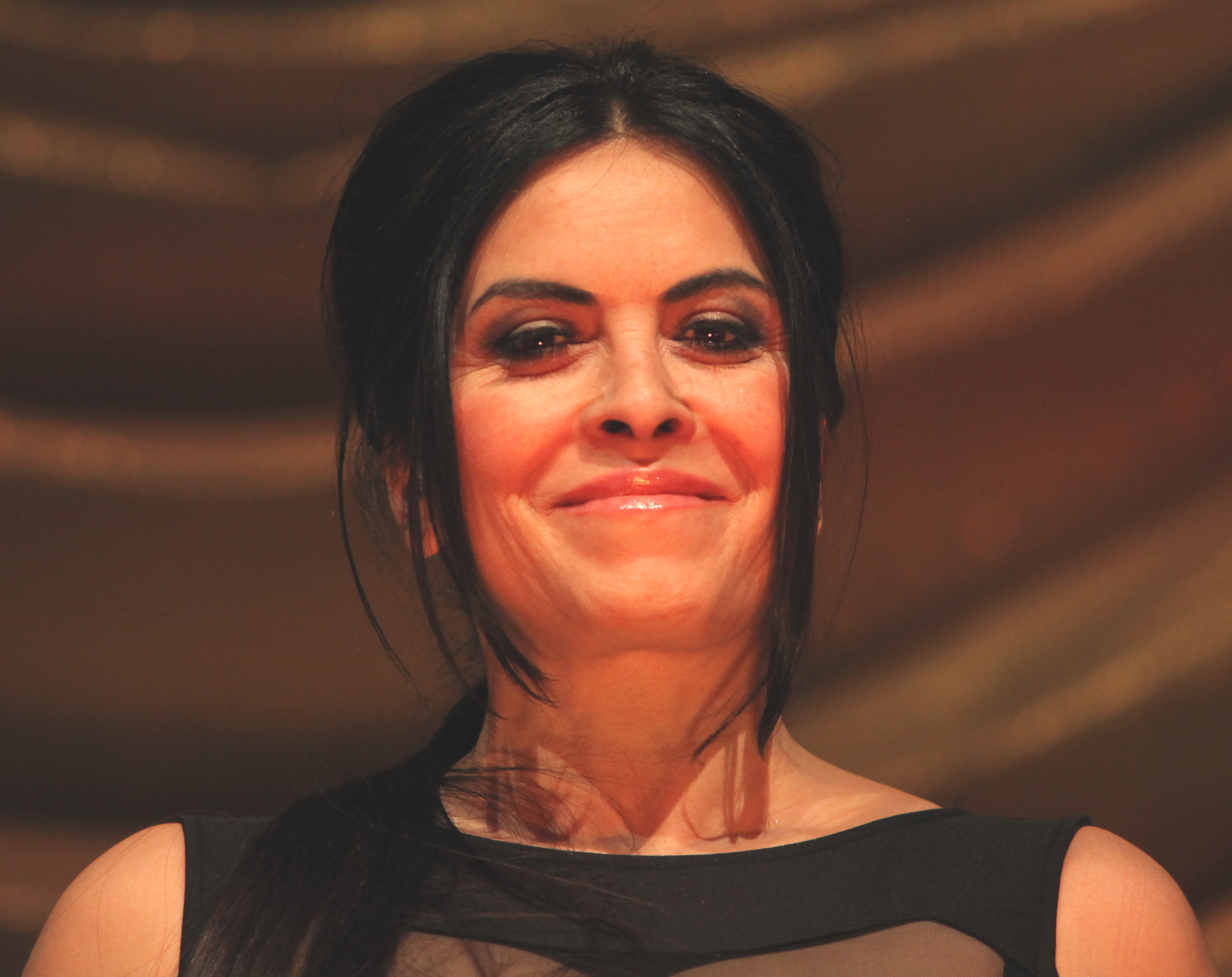
Nursel Köse

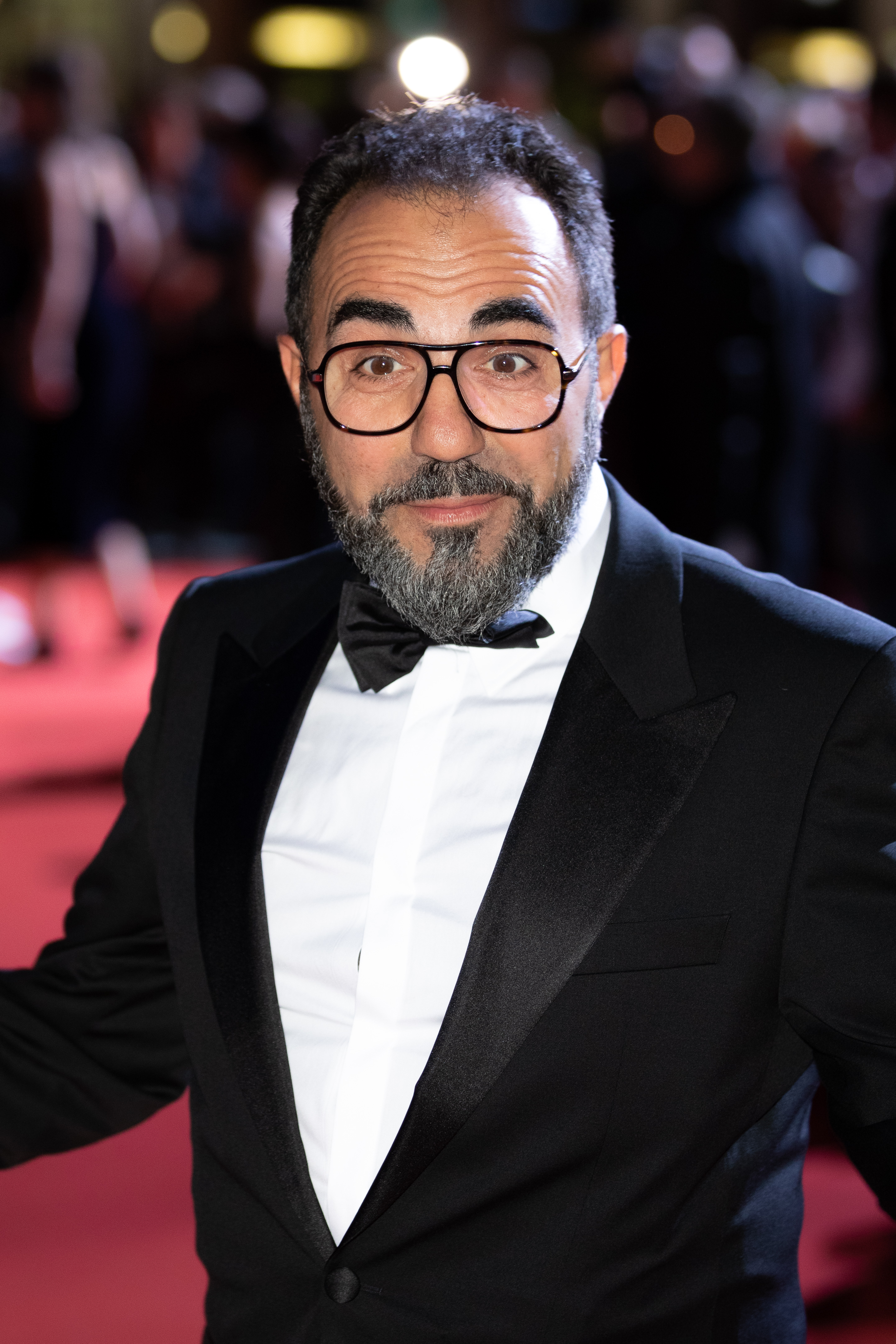
Adnan Maral

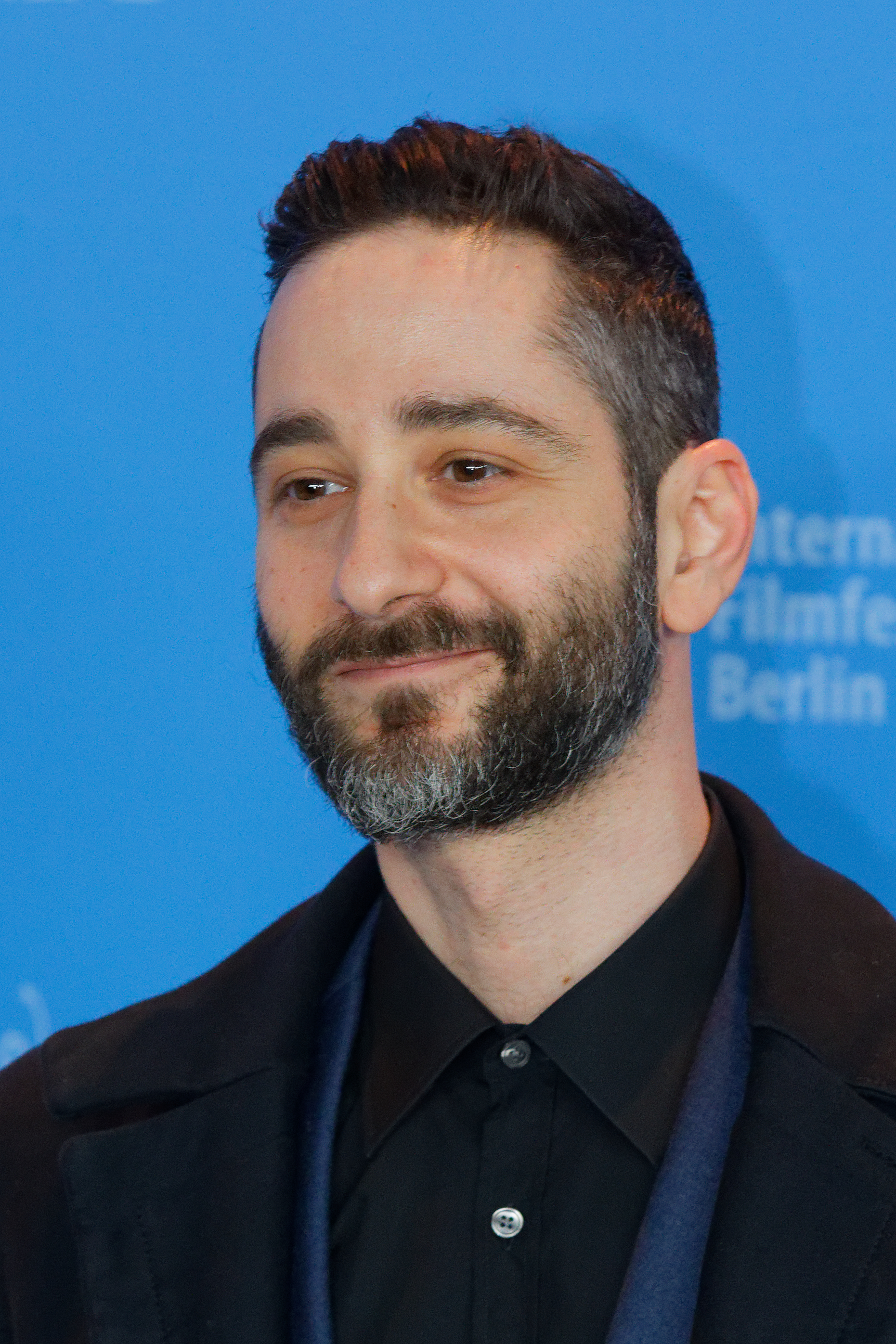
Denis Moschitto

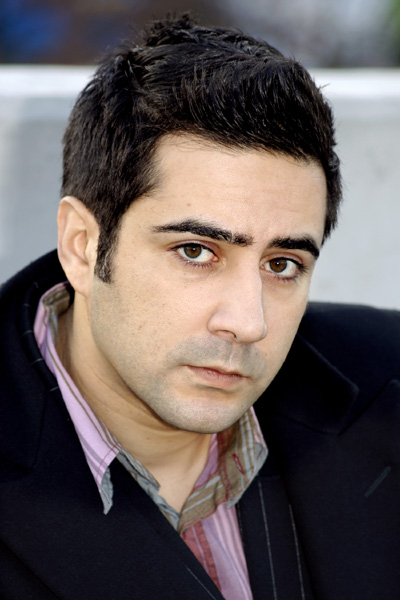
Özgür Özata

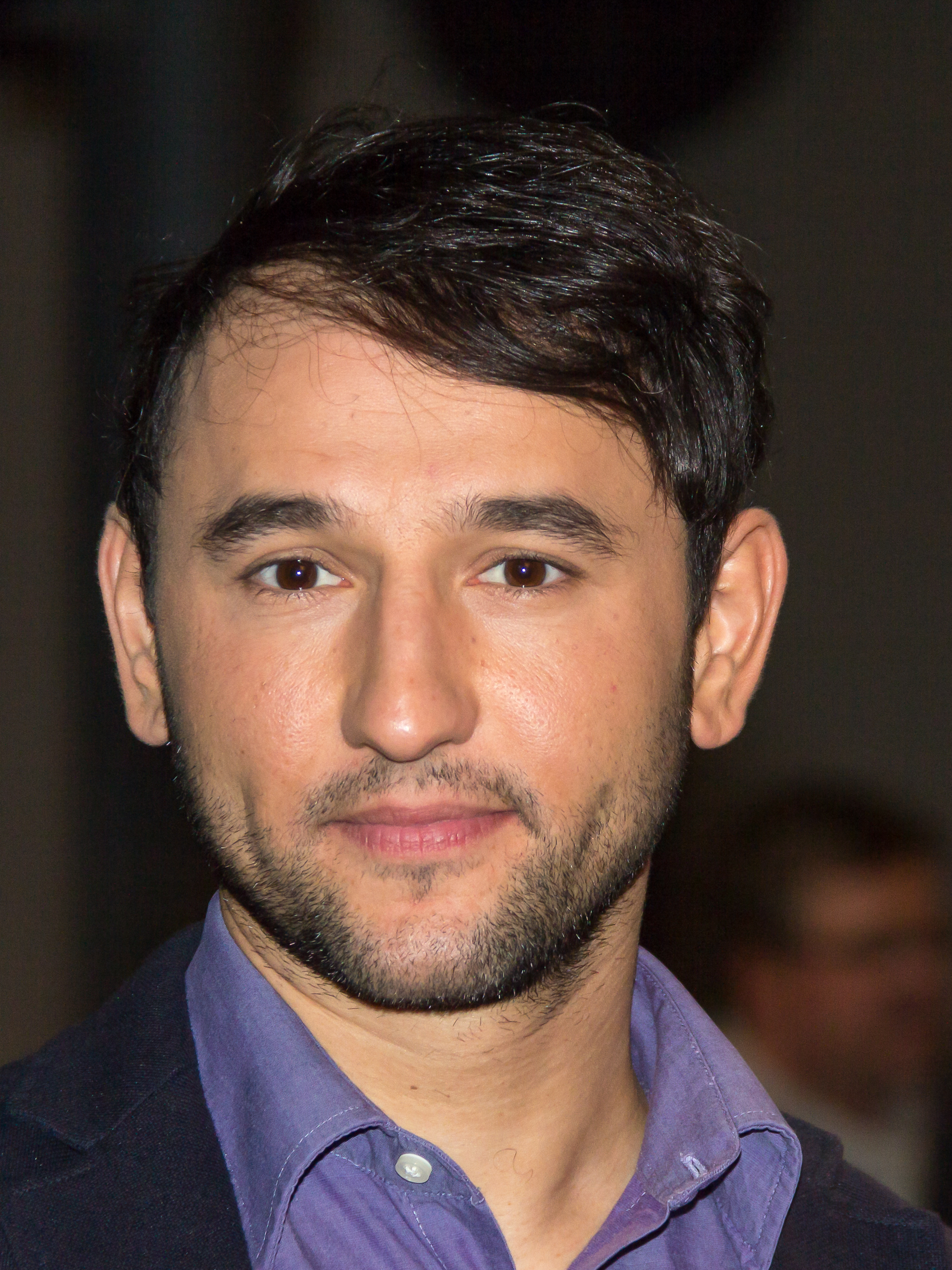
Taner Sahintürk

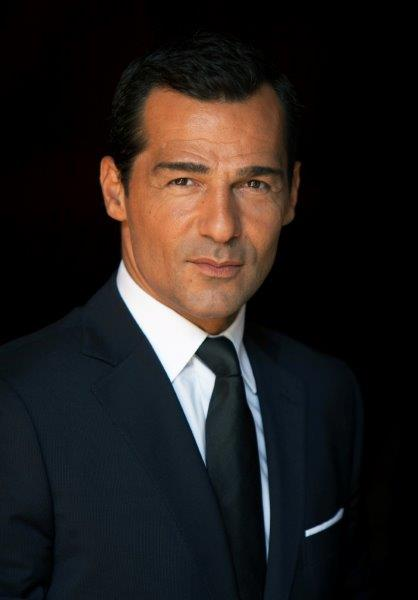
Erol Sander

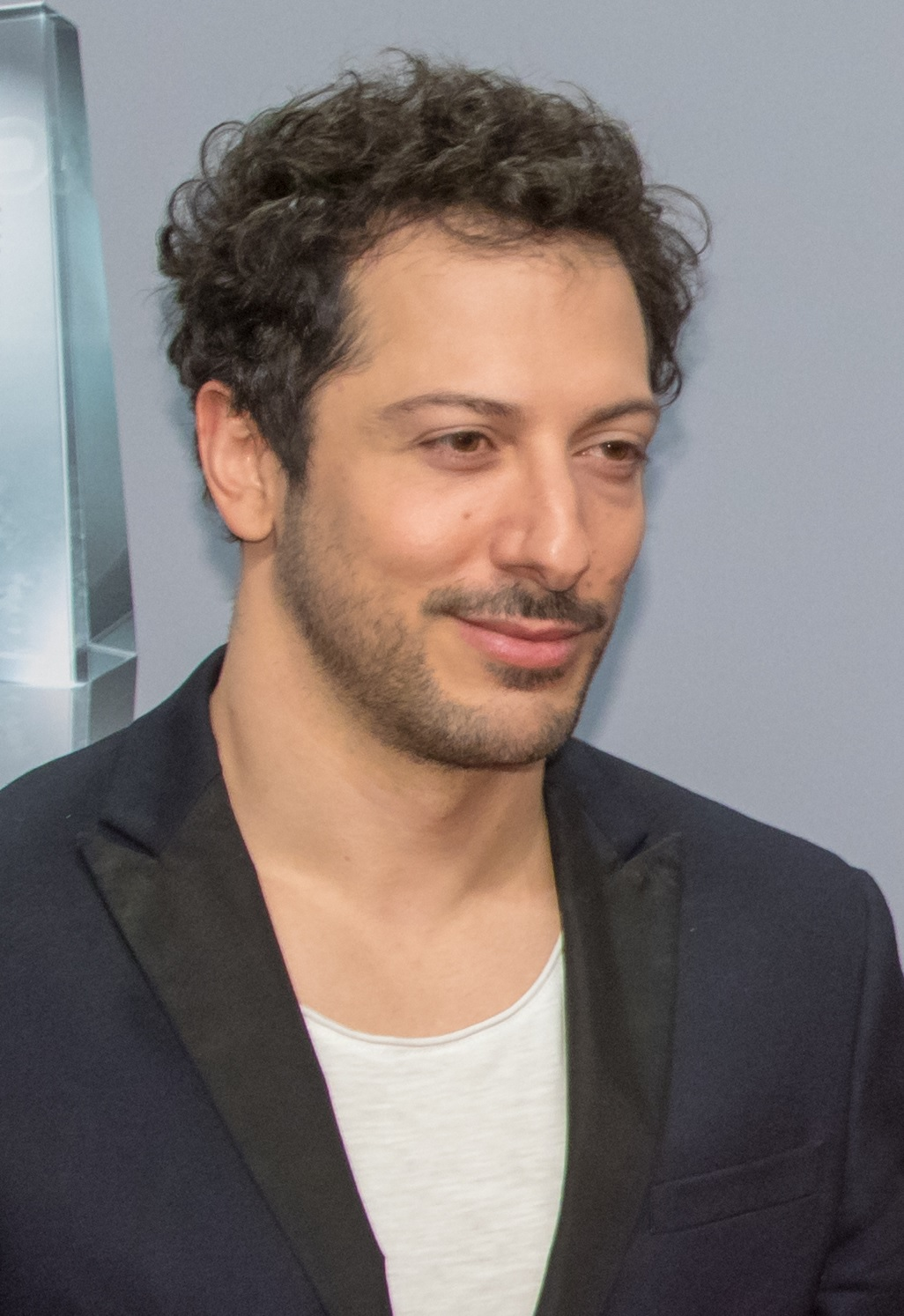
Fahri Yardım

- Numan Acar, actor and film producer
- Cem Akin, actor
- Ben Akkaya, actor
- Sinan Akkuş, director, writer and actor
- Ozan Aksu, actor
- Sinan Albayrak, actor
- Erden Alkan, actor
- Can Arduc, actor and model
- Jale Arıkan, film and television actress
- Tamer Arslan, actor
- Aslan Aslan, actor
- Django Asül, actor and comedian
- Erdoğan Atalay, actor
- Mehmet Ateşçi, actor
- Akif Aydin, actor
- Sabahat Bademsoy, actress
- Tayfun Bademsoy, actor
- Almila Bagriacik, actress
- İlknur Bahadır, actress
- Tayfun Baydar, actor
- Aslı Bayram, actress and winner of Miss Germany (2005)
- Arzu Bazman, actress and model
- Funda Bostanlik, actress
- Yasin Boynuince, actor
- İlknur Boyraz, actress
- Zeynep Bozbay, actress
- Olgu Caglar, actor
- Kerem Can, actor
- Yasmin Canli, actress
- Özgür Cebe, actor (Turkish, Kurdish, and Armenian origin)
- Ava Celik, actress
- Aleksan Cetinkaya, actor
- Yasemin Cetinkaya, actress (Turkish father and German mother)
- Vildan Cirpan, actress
- Yunus Cumartpay, actor
- Ebru Cündübeyoğlu, actress
- Tan Çağlar, comedian, actor, presenter and model
- Serkan Çayoğlu, actor
- Fırat Çelik, actor
- Fatih Çevikkollu, actor
- Ceren Dal, actress
- Sophie Dal, actress
- Baki Davrak, actor
- Neshe Demir, actress and producer
- Renan Demirkan, actress
- Zejhun Demirov, actor (Turkish Macedonian origin)
- İsmail Deniz, actor
- Murat Dikenci, actor
- Turgay Doğan, actor
- Şebnem Dönmez, actress, TV host, and former model
- Şükriye Dönmez, actress
- Ercan Durmaz, actor
- Serkan Durmus, actor
- Hülya Duyar, actress
- Özlem Düvencioğlu, actress and film producer
- Eray Eğilmez, actor
- Uğur Ekeroğlu, actor
- Şiir Eloğlu, actress
- Erhan Emre, actor
- Gizem Emre, actress
- Aybi Era, actress
- Selma Ergeç, actress
- Emire Erhan-Neubauer, actress
- Pinar Erincin, actress
- Vedat Erincin, actor
- Arzu Ermen, actress
- Eyüp Ertan, actor
- Sahin Eryilmaz, actor
- Aylin Esener, actress
- Fahriye Evcen, actress
- Özay Fecht, actress
- Nur Fettahoğlu, actress
- Derya Flechtner, voice actress
- Tuncay Gary, actor
- Jasmin Gerat, actress (Turkish father and German mother)
- Sadjah Gezza, silent film actress and dancer
- Demir Gökgöl, actor
- Demet Gül, actress
- Erkan Gündüz, actor, stuntman and director
- Orhan Güner, actor
- Ozan Güven, actor (Turkish Bulgarian origin)
- Ahmet Olgun Han, actor
- Lilli Hollunder, actress (Turkish mother and German father)
- Lilay Huser, actress
- Esra Inal, actress
- Kurt Ipekkaya, actor
- Volkan Isbert, actor
- Yasin Islek, actor
- Timur Işık, actor (Turkish father and German mother)
- Selman Iyi, actor
- Arman İnci, actor
- Çetin İpekkaya, actor
- Aylin Kabasakal, actress
- İlker Kaleli, actor
- Meltem Kaptan, actress and comedian
- Ercan Karaçaylı, actor and director
- Özgür Karadeniz, actor
- Nefise Karatay, actress, TV presenter and model
- Lale Karci, actress and model
- Serkan Kaya, actor
- Aykut Kayacık, actor
- Sibel Kekilli, actress
- Serdar Keskin, actor and filmmaker
- Canan Kir, actress
- Adnan G. Köse, director, screenwriter, actor, playwright and producer
- Nursel Köse, actress
- Asuman Krause, actress, TV presenter and model (Turkish mother and German father)
- Mehmet Kurtuluş, actor
- Tekin Kurtuluş, actor
- Hussi Kutlucan, filmmaker and actor
- Mustafa Kuzu (actor), actor
- Devrim Lingnau, actress (Turkish father and a German mother)
- Kader Loth (actress), reality show actress
- Adnan Maral, actor
- Maxim Mehmet, actor
- Sema Meray, actress
- Erdal Merdan, actor
- Hasan Ali Mete, actor
- Esin Moralıoğlu, actress and model
- Denis Moschitto, actor (Turkish mother and Italian father)
- Gandi Mukli, actor (Turkish Syrian origin)
- Gökhan Mumcu, actor
- Orhan Okan, actor
- Kenan Ormanlar, actor and film producer (Turkish Macedonian origin)
- Özgür Özata, actor
- Volkan Özcan, actor
- Ercan Özçelik, actor
- Oktay Özdemir, actor
- Rona Özkan, actress
- Okan Patirer, actor
- Meral Perin, actress
- Biene Pilavci, filmmaker and actress
- Haluk Piyes, actor
- Sevda Polat, actress
- Sema Poyraz, actress
- Hürdem Riethmüller, actress
- Ayse Romey, actress
- Engin Sahin, actor
- Seren Sahin, film producer and actor
- Varol Sahin, actor
- Taner Sahintürk, actor
- Erol Sander, actor
- Deniz Sarsilmaz, actor
- Selçuk Sazak, actor
- Jennifer Şebnem Schaefer, actress, TV presenter and model (Turkish mother and German father)
- Tolga Seker, actor
- Nezâ Selbuz, actress
- Hakan Serbes, pornographic actor
- Murat Seven, actor
- Tim Seyfi, actor
- Nuri Sezer, actor
- Bülent Sharif, actor and model
- Ünal Silver, actor
- Ömer Simsek, actor
- Yeliz Simsek, actress
- Nadir Sisman, actor
- Fatma Souad, actress and LGBT activist
- Sascha Laura Soydan, actress
- Hilmi Sözer, actor
- İsmail Şahin, actor
- Sıla Şahin, actress
- Türkiz Talay, actress
- Can Taylanlar, actor (Turkish father and German mother)
- Serkan Temel, actor
- Aylin Tezel, actress and dancer
- Tamer Tıraşoğlu, actor
- Beren Tuna, actress
- Süleyman-Mikail Tufan, actor
- Leyla Lydia Tuğutlu, actress, model and winner of Miss Turkey (2008) (Turkish father and German mother)
- Nicolas Fethi Türksever, actor
- Cem Sultan Ungan, actor
- Tito Uysal, actor
- Meryem Uzerli, actress (Turkish father and German mother)
- Eralp Uzun, actor
- Timur Ülker, actor
- Murat Ünal, film director, screenwriter, film producer, editor and actor
- Tuna Ünal, actor
- Birol Ünel, actor
- İdil Üner, actress
- Süheyla Ünlü, actress
- Funda Vanroy, TV presenter and actress
- Lale Yanık, actress
- Mennan Yapo, director, screenwriter, producer and actor
- Fahri Yardım, actor
- Murat Yeginer, theatre actor and theatre director
- Murat Yılmaz, actor
- Mehmet Yilmaz (actor), actor
- Burak Yiğit, actor
- Tamer Yiğit (actor, 1974), actor
- Mürtüz Yolcu, actor
- Ismail Zagros, actor

== See also ==
- Turks in Germany
- List of German locations named after people and places of Turkish origin
  - Türkenstraße ("Turks Street")
- List of Germans
