= Özgür Özata =

Turkish-German actor

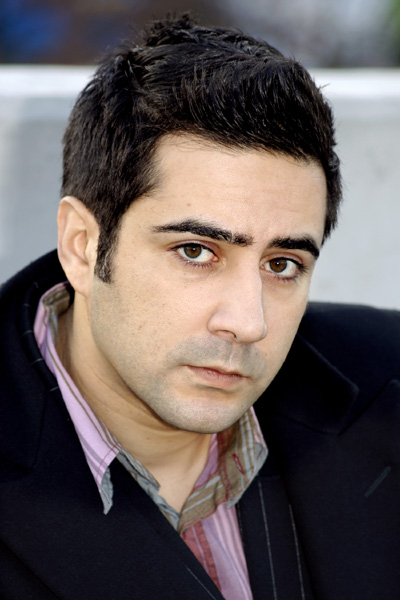
- Born: Özgür Özata; 17 February 1977 (age 49); İskenderun, Turkey.
- Years active: 1993–present

Özgür Özata (born 17 February 1977) is a Turkish-German actor.

== Filmography ==
=== Films ===
- Fern (1997, short)
- Aprilkinder (1998)
- Der Ausbruch (2000, short)
- Poppitz (2002)
- Alim Market (2004, short)
- Counterparts (2007)
- The Moon and Other Lovers (2008)

=== Television ===
- Hausmeister Krause – Ordnung muss sein (2007)
- Alles Atze (2007)
- Das Geheimnis meines Vaters (2006)
- Alle lieben Jimmy (2006)
- Marienhof (2006, 2009)
- Ein Fall für zwei (2005)
- Blackout – Die Erinnerung ist tödlich (2006)
- Siska (2005)
- König von Kreuzberg (2005)
- Die Kommissarin (2006)
- Leipzig Homicide (2005)
- Zoes Arkadas
- Die schnelle Gerdi (2004)
- Balko (2002)
- Abschnitt 40 (2002)
- Offroad.TV (2001)
- Der Fahnder (2001)
- Die Kumpel (2001)
- Der Superbulle und die Halbstarken (2000)
- My Sweet Home (2001)
- Wolffs Revier (2000)
- Die Verwegene – Kämpfe um deinen Traum (2000)
- Küstenwache (2000)
- Für alle Fälle Stefanie (1999–2000)
- Die Bademeister (1999)
- Sperling und der brennende Arm (1998)
- Happy Birthday
- Die Fallers (1995)
- Der Millionenerbe (1993)

== Awards ==
For Aprilkinder:

- 1999: Fernsehfilm-Festival Baden-Baden: Special Award
- 1999: Filmfestival Max Ophüls Preis: Audience Award

For Sperling und der brennende Arm:

- 1998: Filmfest München: VFF TV Movie Award
- 1999: Deutscher Fernsehpreis: in vielen Kategorien
- 1999: Fernsehfilm-Festival Baden-Baden: Teleplay Award

For My Sweet Home:

- 1999: Adolf-Grimme-Preis: Nominierung
- 2000: Internationale Filmfestspiele Berlin

For Alim Market:

- 2004: Nominierung für den FIRST STEPS Award, Berlin
- 2004: Nominierung für den Studio Hamburg Nachwuchspreis
- 2004: 1. Preis TV-Design Köln
- 2004: Hauptpreis des Int. Festivals B16, Brünn, Çeçenya
- 2005: Silver Award (Comedy) des WorldMediaFestivals, Hamburg
- 2005: 2. Preis Athens International Film and Video Festival, Ohio
- 2005: HDF-Sonderpreis und Nominierung FFA Short Tiger 2005, Filmfest München
- 2005: Honorable Mention: Adobe Design Achievement Awards

For Counterparts:

- 2007 Cannes - „Quinzaine des Réalisateurs“ (Director's Fortnight), Lobende Erwähnung
- 2007 Filmfest München, En İyi Senaryo
- 2007 Nominiert für den FIRST STEPS AWARD, En İyi Film
- 2007 Europäischen Filmpreis, 2007 Avrupa'da Keşfedilenler
- 2007 1. Hachenburger Filmfest, Preis „Der Junge Löwe“ im Forum Nachwuchsfilmer
- 2007 Pusan International Film Festival
