= Özçelik =

Özçelik is a Turkish surname. Notable people with the surname include:

- Ercan Özçelik (born 1967), Turkish-German actor
- Gamze Özçelik (born 1982), Turkish actress, model and TV hostess
- Okan Özçelik (born 1992), Turkish footballer
- Özlem Özçelik (born 1972), Turkish volleyball player
- Silhan Özçelik (born 1996), British woman convicted for planning to join the PKK
