= Okan =

Okan may refer to:

- Okan (Go competition), a Japanese Go competition
- Okan University, private university in Istanbul, Turkey
- Okanagan Valley Railway (reporting mark: OKAN)
- Okan (band), Canadian world music group

== Given name ==
- Okan Alkan, Turkish footballer
- Okan Aydın, Turkish-German footballer
- Okan Buruk, Turkish football manager
- Okan Bayülgen, Turkish actor
- Okan Deniz (born 1994), Turkish footballer
- Okan Derici, Turkish footballer
- Okan Ersoy, American scientist
- Okan Koç, Turkish footballer
- Okan Özçelik, Turkish footballer
- Okan Öztürk, Turkish footballer
- Okan Patirer, Turkish actor
- Okan Yılmaz, Turkish footballer

== Middle name ==
- Tekin Okan Düzgün (born 1988), Turkish paralympic goalball player

== Surname ==
- Tanju Okan (1938–1996), Turkish singer

== See also ==
- Okun (disambiguation)
