= Lilay Huser =

German-Turkish actress (born 1958)

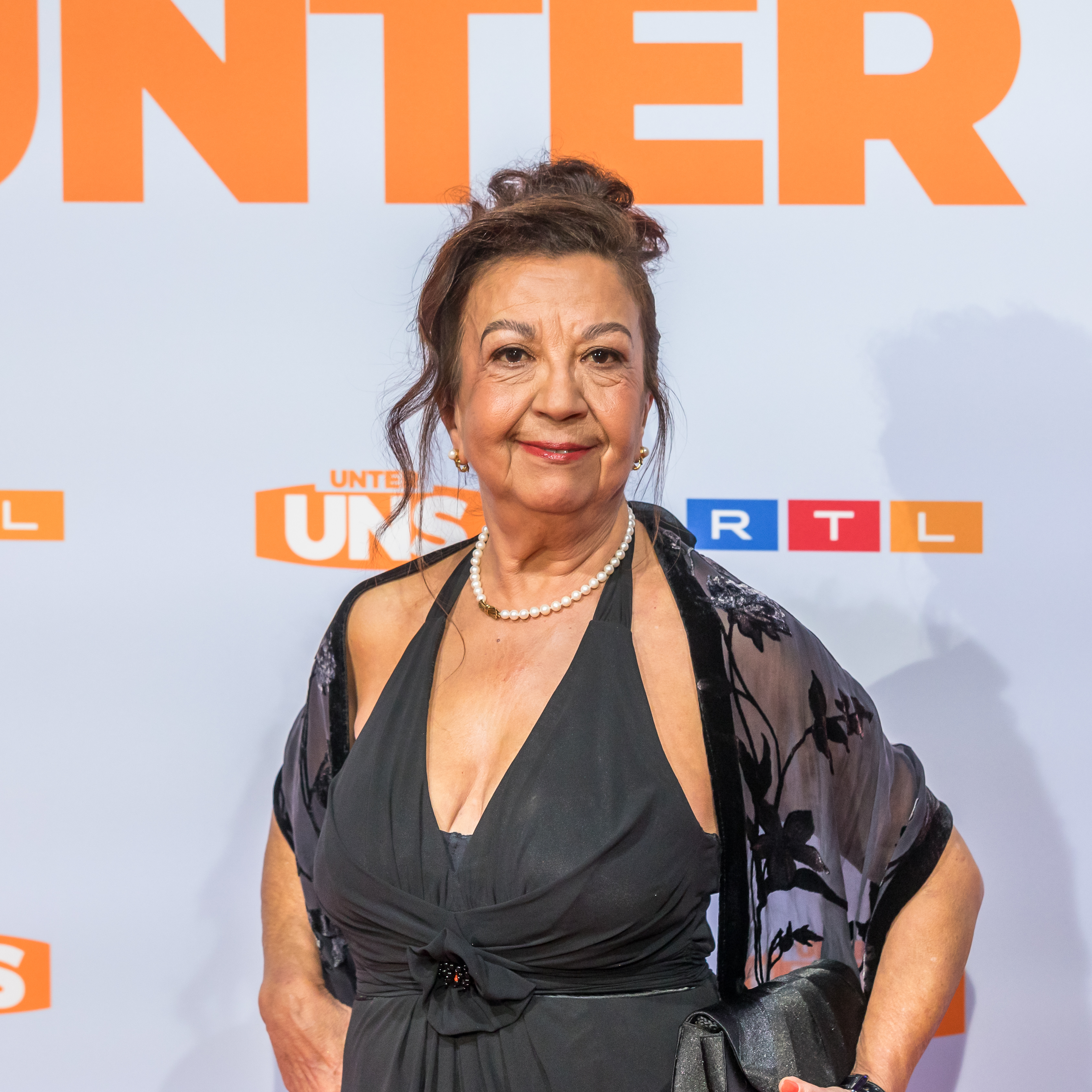
Lilay Huser, 2024

Lilay Huser, formerly Lilay Erincin (born 1958), is a German-Turkish actress.

== Career ==
Huser was born in Turkey. With a diploma in textile engineering, she emigrated to Krefeld in 1978 for her studies, and later to Wuppertal. By that time Huser already had an affinity for the theater. From 1986 onwards, for example, she worked increasingly in the intercultural theater scene of North Rhine-Westphalia, such as acting at the Arkadas Theater in Cologne and co-founding the Wupper-Theater.

Huser has acted in film roles since 2000, often on television in TV crime shows like Tatort. Her most notable roles are "Fatma Melek" in König von Kreuzberg (2005) and "Grandma Öztürk" in Türkisch für Anfänger (2008). She landed several other major roles in films such as Chiko (2008), Evet, I Do! (2008), What a Man (2011), and in one of the main roles in Almanya - Welcome to Germany (2011), along with her former husband Vedat Erincin.

== Filmography (selection) ==
- 2005: König von Kreuzberg
- 2008: Türkisch für Anfänger
- 2008: Chiko
- 2008: Evet, I Do!
- 2011: Almanya: Welcome to Germany
- 2011: What a Man
- 2013: When Inge Is Dancing
- 2013: King Ping – Tap Taps Tödchen
- 2014: Monaco 110: Einstand
- 2015: Macho Man
- 2016: Alarm für Cobra 11 – Die Autobahnpolizei
- 2016: Die Pfefferkörner: Goldqueen Loves You
