= Şamdereli =

Şamdereli is a Turkish surname. Notable people with the surname include:

- Nesrin Şamdereli (born 1979), Turkish-German screenwriter and film director
- Yasemin Şamdereli (born 1973), Turkish-German actress, screenwriter and film director
