= Duyar =

Duyar is a Turkish surname. Notable people with the surname include:

- Gürdal Duyar (1935–2004), Turkish sculptor
- Hülya Duyar (born 1970), Turkish-German actress
