= Şiir Eloğlu =

Turkish-German actress (born 1965)

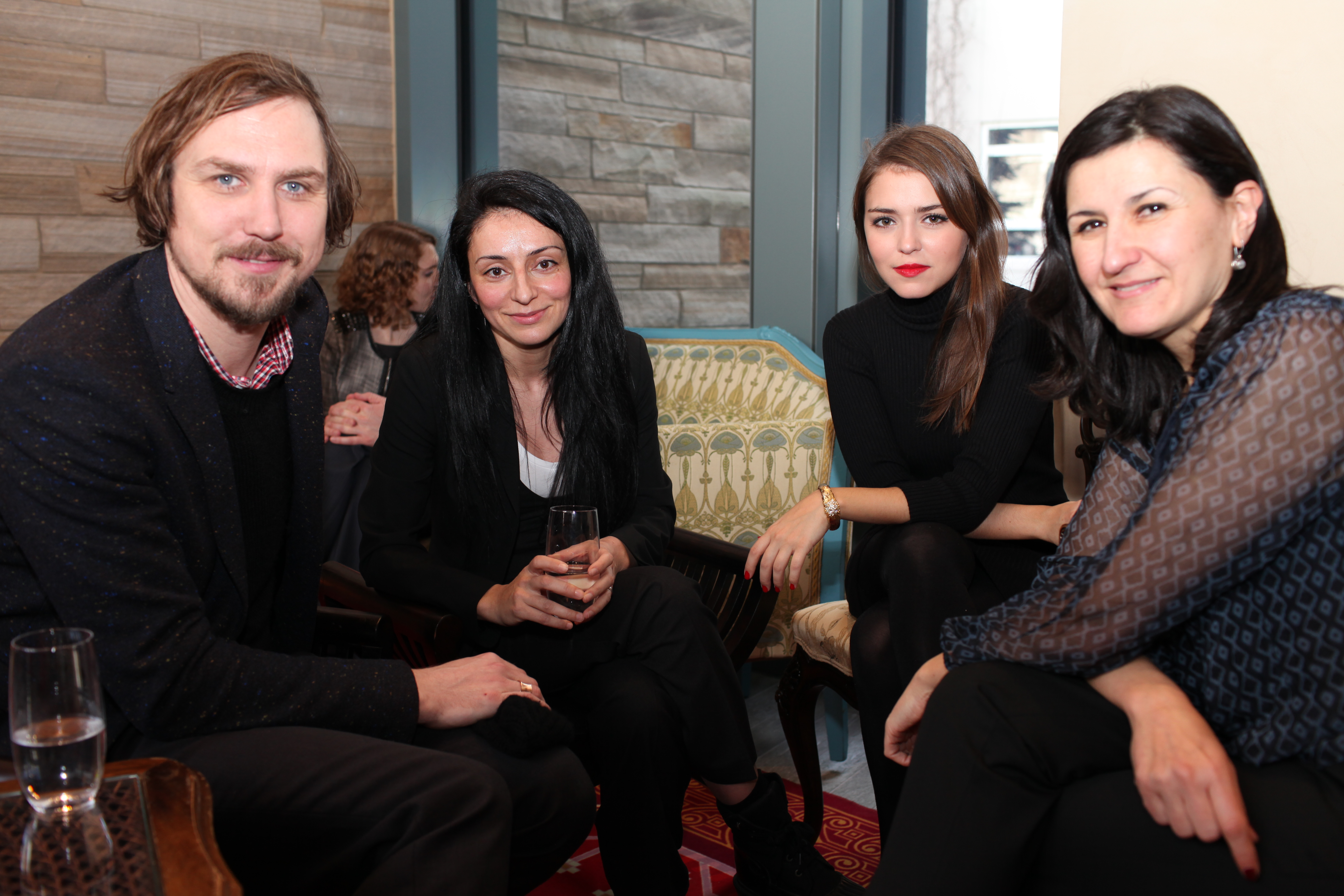
Lars Eidinger, Yasemin Şamdereli, Ava Celik, and Şiir Eloğlu, 2014

Şiir Eloğlu (born 6 December 1965) is a German actress of Turkish origin. She lives and works in Berlin and Cologne.

== Life ==
Eloğlu was born on 6 December 1965 in Istanbul, Turkey. She moved from Istanbul to Cologne as a four year old. The name "Şiir" is derived from her father, Metin Eloğlu (1927–1985), a painter and lyricist, who was awarded with important literature awards in the 1960s and 1970s.

After graduating from high school in Cologne, Eloğlu studied for four years at the Hochschule für Musik Saar in Saarbrücken. Her first engagements then took her to theatres in Erlangen, Oberhausen, and Cologne.

In 1991, she made her first film with Happy Birthday, Turk!, directed by Doris Dörrie, and acted with Ulrike Folkerts in her first Tatort. Eloğlu became known to a wider audience between 1993 and 1996 by her role of young assistant doctor Dr. Nesrin Ergün in the RTL series Stadtklinik.

At the end of 1997, she moved to Berlin. She followed TV and cinema productions as well as theater engagements, among others at the Düsseldorfer Schauspielhaus, where she acted in Antigone and Seven Against Thebes.

Her first international film production was the Swiss film 180° – Wenn deine Welt plötzlich Kopf steht, which was filmed by director Cihan Inan in Zurich. The international cast included Sophie Rois, Christopher Buchholz, Sabine Timoteo, and Michael Neuenschwander. The film ran at festivals in Antalya, Saarbrücken, Sudbury, and Marrakesh, as well as in the Spanish Ourense, where it received an award for Best Screenplay.

She was featured in Almanya - Welcome to Germany, directed by Yasemin Şamdereli, as Leyla Yılmaz. The film was awarded the Deutscher Filmpreis.

From 2014 to 2015, she played the architect Suna Kaya in the soap opera Lindenstraße.

== Filmography ==
- 1991: Happy Birthday, Turk!
- 1992: Tatort – Falsche Liebe (TV series)
- 1992–1996: Stadtklinik (TV series)
- 1997: Ärzte: Kinderärztin Leah – Auf der Flucht (TV series)
- 1998: Tatort – In der Falle (TV series)
- 1998: Alphateam – Die Lebensretter im OP (TV series)
- 1998: Tour Abroad
- 2004: Der Dicke (TV series)
- 2005–2006: Die Anrheiner (TV series)
- 2006–2011: Der Dicke (TV series)
- 2007: Notruf Hafenkante (TV series)
- 2008: Evet, I Do!
- 2008: Sheep and Chips
- 2009: Danni Lowinski (TV series)
- Seit 2010: Gute Zeiten, schlechte Zeiten (TV series)
- 2010: 180° – Wenn deine Welt plötzlich Kopf steht
- 2010: Tatort – Leben gegen Leben (TV series)
- 2011: Der Verdacht (TV film)
- 2011: Almanya: Welcome to Germany
- 2011: Marco W. – 247 Tage im türkischen Gefängnis
- 2011: Tatort – Im Abseits
- 2013: Tatort – Machtlos
- 2013: 5 Jahre Leben
- 2013: Sitting Next To Zoe
- 2013: A Spicy Kraut
- 2014: Kückückskind
- 2014–2015: Lindenstraße (TV series)
- 2015: Die Kanzlei (TV series)
- 2015: Der Kriminalist – Im Namen des Vaters
- 2016: Goster
- 2017: Aus dem Nichts
- 2017: Tehran Taboo
- 2018: Heldt
- 2019: Servus, Schwiegersohn!
- 2020: Matzo, kebab and sauerkraut
- 2020–2021: Bettys Diagnose
- 2021: Servus, mother-in-law!
- 2022: We Might As Well Be Dead

== Literature ==
- Alexandra Eul: Şiir Eloğlu. Die Komische. In: Emma, September/October 2014, pp. 14–15.
