= Vedat Erincin =

Turkish-German actor

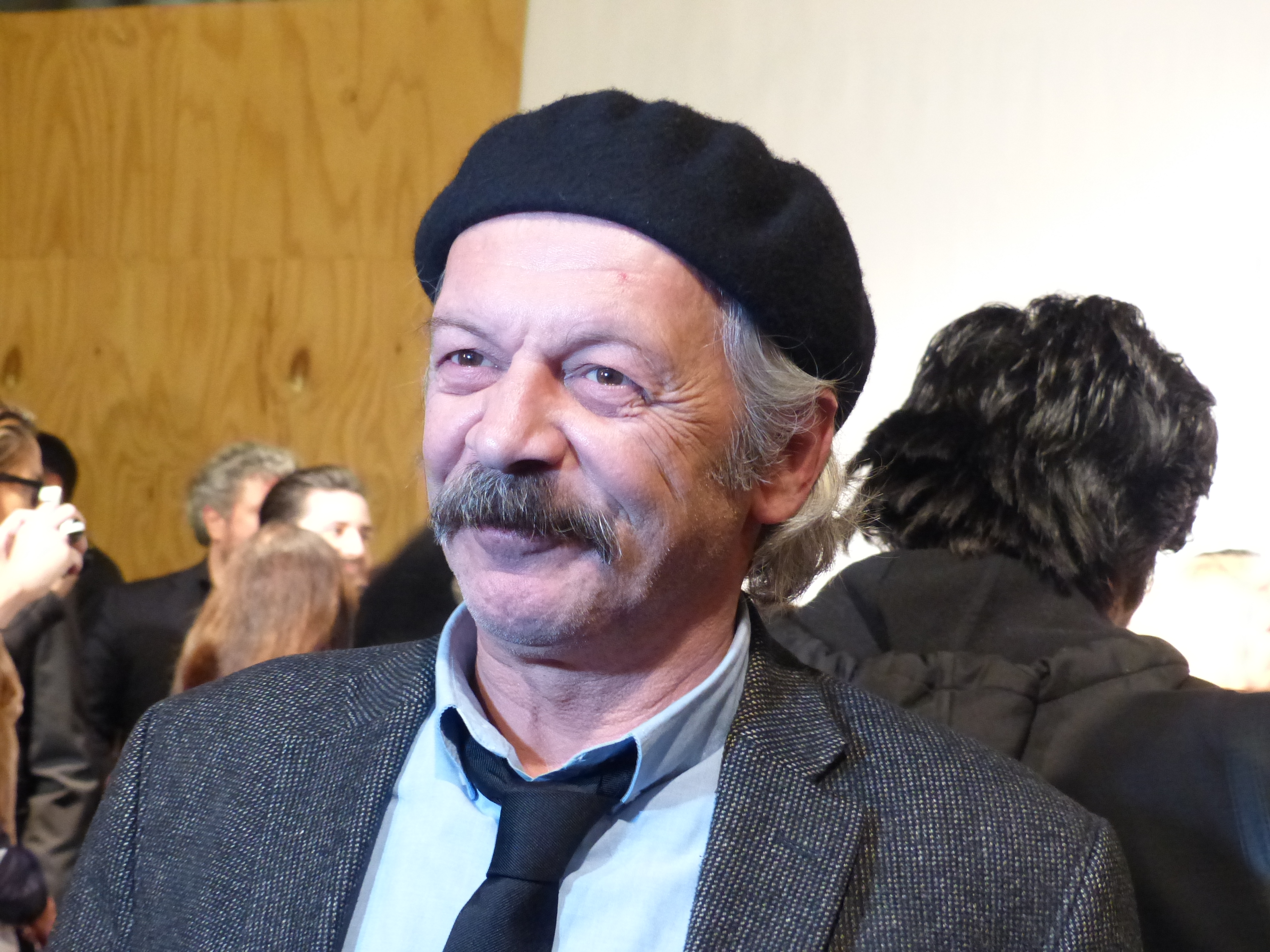
Vedat Erincin at the premiere of "300 Worte Deutsch" in 2014.

Vedat Erincin (born 1957, Istanbul) is a German actor of Turkish origin. The co-founder of the Wuppertal-based Wupper-Theater and former head of the Arkadaş Theater, he is dedicated to intercultural theatrical work. His former wife is fellow actress Lilay Huser.

== Career ==
Erincin came to Germany in 1978 and started a textile study here. In 1983 his first daughter, Pinar Erincin, was born. In addition, he had already directed plays in Turkish clubs. In 1986, he joined the ensemble of Arkadaş Theatre as a professional actor. In 1991, he was co-founder of the Wupper-Theater in Wuppertal, where he worked until 2003. Afterwards, he worked as an actor, director and children's theater author again at the Arkadaş Theatre and took over there, until 2006, the direction of the theater. He also participated in radio play as a speaker, among other things. He acted in the WDR production Fremde Heimat (1992) by Ismail Dogan and Nursel Köses Der Schlangenbrunnen (2000). Erincin also belonged to the ensemble of the premiere of Sema Merays Wegen der Ehre (2008).

His first film and television appearances include the role of Kadir in Evet, I Do! (2008). In the German-Turkish film Almanya: Welcome to Germany, which was invited to the competition program of the Berlinale 2011, he took over the leading role of the Hüseyin. In the same year, he was nominated for a Deutscher Filmpreis for his supporting role as an enlightened Islamic cleric in Shahada.

== Filmography (selection) ==
- 2008: Evet, I Do!
- 2010: Shahada
- 2010: Wilsberg – Gefahr im Verzug
- 2011: Almanya: Welcome to Germany
- 2011: Franzi (TV series, episode: Sitar und Dudelsack)
- 2011: Tatort – Der Weg ins Paradies
- 2012: Brüder
- 2012: Kuma
- 2012: Alarm für Cobra 11: Gier
- 2012: Foreign Deployment
- 2012: Leipzig Homicide: Gefrorenes Blut
- 2012: Agent Ranjid rettet die Welt
- 2013: Willkommen bei Habib
- 2013: Wie Tag und Nacht
- 2013: 300 Worte Deutsch
- 2014: Lost in Karastan
- 2015: Macho Man
- 2015: Alarm für Cobra 11: Vendetta
- 2016: Plötzlich Türke
- 2020: Nasipse Adayız
- 2020: Çukur
- 2021: Gölgelerin İçinde
- 2023: The Tailor
- 2023: Hesitation Wound
