= Meral Perin =

Turkish-German actress (born 1965)

- Born: 1965 (age 60–61)
- Years active: 1997–present

Meral Perin (born 1965) is a Turkish-German actress.

== Filmography ==
Film
Year	Film	Role	Notes
2008	Evet, I Do!	Songül	
2008	Pizza und Marmelade	Ali Özkan	
2004	Süperseks	Dilek	
2000	L'amour, l'argent, l'amour	Kollegin Mary	
2000	Tour Abroad	Kellnerin	

=== Television ===
Year	Film	Role	Notes
2006-07	Tatort	Fatma Özkan	2 episodes
2007	Solo für Schwarz - Tödliche Blicke	Katharina Petrescu	
2006-07	Alle lieben Jimmy	Gül Arkadas	16 episodes
2006	Alles bleibt anders	Fatma Tüfekci	
2003-06	Nachtschicht	Irene Novoselic	3 episodes
2006	Solo für Schwarz - Der Tod kommt zurück	Katharina Petrescu	
2005	Nikola	Asa	1 episode
2005	Der Fürst und das Mädchen	Hanna Gromer	1 episode
2005	Solo für Schwarz - Tod im See	Katharina Petrescu	
2002-04	Im Namen des Gesetzes	Rechtsanwältin Rasch	2 episodes
2004	Leipzig Homicide		1 episode
2003	Tod im Park	Katharina Petrescu	
2003	K3 – Kripo Hamburg	Heike Ludwig	1 episode
2002	Drei Frauen, ein Plan und die ganz große Kohle	Nuray	
2002	Die Cleveren	Erika Wecker	1 episode
2000	Balko	Bettina Kranach	1 episode
2000	Die Kommissarin	Susan Mayer	1 episode
1997-99	Einsatz Hamburg Süd	Sema Aslan	26 episodes
1997	Wilde Zeiten	Maggie	
