= Lilli Hollunder =

German actress

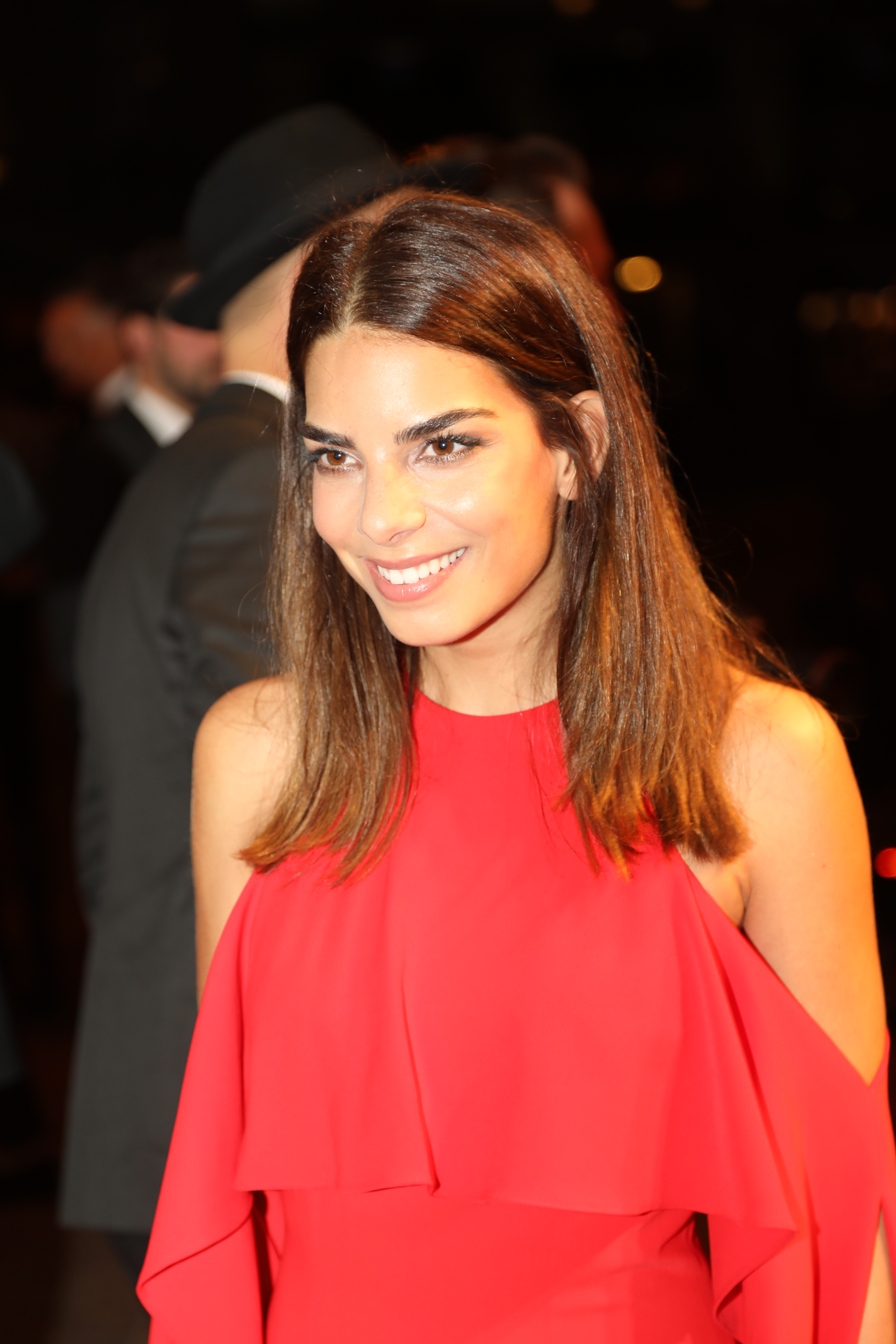
- Hollunder in 2017
- Born: 5 May 1986 (age 39); Leverkusen, West Germany
- Occupation: Actress
- Years active: 2002–present
- Spouse: René Adler (m. 2016)
- Children: 1 (Casper)

Lilli Hollunder (born 5 May 1986) is a German actress recently appearing in the American television series The Outpost, filmed in Serbia.

== Early life ==
Lilli Hollunder's mother is the German-Turkish actress and author Sema Meray, her father is a German doctor from North Rhine-Westphalia. Hollunder graduated from high school in Cologne in 2005.

== Career ==
Even during her school days, she worked as an actress in individual episodes of television series such as ‘’Lindenstrasse by Das Erste ), Alarm für Cobra 11 – Die Autobahnpolizei by RTL and Cologne P.D. (SOKO Köln) by ZDF. In addition, she received private acting and singing lessons. From April 2005 to April 2008, Hollunder played the role of Lisa Brandner in the ARD early evening series Verbotene Liebe. From the end of December 2010 (episode 597) to April 13, 2012, she was seen in a leading role in the Sat.1 telenovela Anna und die Liebe.

In addition to her involvement in television, Hollunder also worked as an actress in the theater. In February 2008 she played in the German-Turkish play Because of Honor / Namus icin (director: Till Rickelt ) at the Freies Werkstatt Theater in Cologne. In 2009 and 2010 she also commented on fan television of the Bundesliga soccer club 1. FC Köln. Hollunder graced the cover of the German edition of FHM twice, while she shared the front page with Verbotene Liebe colleague Yvonne Burbach in December 2005, she was the sole cover girl in September 2007. Hollunder publishes regularly on her blog little hero. Most recently she played until January 2018 at the comedy in the Marquardt in Stuttgart in the play Charley’s Aunt by Brandon Thomas in the Swabian version of Monika Hirschle 'Em Charley sei Tante mit. Between 2010-2012, Hollunder played the role of Jasmin Al Sharif in “Anna und die Liebe” for which she was nominated for the “Sexiest Woman in a German Soap Award” in 2012.

Lilli Hollunder recently starred in the US television series The Outpost, filmed in Serbia,

== Personal life ==
On October 10, 2016, Hollunder married former international goalkeeper Rene Adler. In May 2020, they became parents to a son.

== Filmography ==
- 2002: vice Squad (Die Sitte) (episode 1.01 Whispering Tones )
- 2003-2010: Alarm für Cobra 11 – Die Autobahnpolizei (2 episodes)
- 2004: Cologne P.D. (SOKO Köln) (episode 1.17 Tod am Bau)
- 2005: Lindenstrasse (6 episodes)
- 2005: Mein Leben & Ich (episode 4.08 darkroom )
- 2005–2008: Forbidden Love (Verbotene Liebe) (408 episodes)
- 2008: 112 - They save your life (112 – Sie retten dein Leben) (episode 1.70)
- 2008: Plötzlich Papa – Einspruch abgelehnt! (episode 1.07 At the Prophet's Beard )
- 2010–2012: Anna und die Liebe (TV series)
- 2010: Hermann (short film)
- 2011: de: Ich bin Boes (TV series)
- 2014–2015: Heldt (Fernsehserie) (3 episodes)
- 2016: The Teacher (1 episode: Topf ... Deckel ...)
- 2019: The Prosecutor (1 episode Mysterious Assault )
- 2019: The Outpost (US TV series, season 2)
- 2020: Spides (TV series) 4 episodes
