= Nesrin Şamdereli =

Turkish-German screenwriter

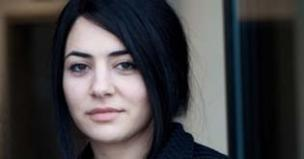
- Born: 1979 (age 46–47); Dortmund, Germany.
- Years active: 1996–present

Nesrin Şamdereli (born 1979) is a Turkish-German screenwriter and film director of Kurdish origin. She was born in Dortmund, North Rhine-Westphalia, West Germany. She studied at the Deutsche Film- und Fernsehakademie Berlin. She worked as a screenwriter on films about Turkish life in Germany. In 2004, she made her directing debut with the short film Delicious. Her first full film was Almanya – Willkommen in Deutschland.

== Filmography ==
- Kısmet (2000)
- Alles getürkt (2002)
- Delicious (2004)
- Sextasy (2004)
- Türkisch für Anfänger (2006)
- Almanya – Willkommen in Deutschland (2011)
- Night of Nights (2018)

== Awards ==
- 2011 German Film Award

== Personal life ==
Şamdereli is the sister of Yasemin Şamdereli.
