= Almanya: Welcome to Germany =

2011 film

- Film poster
- Directed by: Yasemin Şamdereli
- Written by: Yasemin Şamdereli; Nesrin Şamdereli
- Produced by: Annie Brunner; Andreas Richter; Ursula Woerner
- Starring: Vedat Erincin; Fahri Yardım; Lilay Huser; Demet Gül; Aylin Tezel; Rafael Koussouris; Denis Moschitto; Petra Schmidt-Schaller; Aykut Kayacık; Ercan Karacayli; Şiir Eloğlu
- Cinematography: The Chau Ngo
- Production company: Roxy Film
- Distributed by: Concorde Filmverleih (Germany)
- Release dates: 12 February 2011 (Berlin); 10 March 2011 (Germany)
- Running time: 101 minutes
- Country: Germany
- Languages: German; Turkish; (Note: In scenes set in the past, the family speaks in German, and Germans speak in gibberish)

Almanya: Welcome to Germany (German: Almanya – Willkommen in Deutschland) (Almanya is Turkish for Germany) is a 2011 German comedy-drama film directed by Yasemin Şamdereli. The film premiered at the 61st Berlin International Film Festival in the section competition and won the Deutscher Filmpreis 2011 in the categories Best Script and Best Film.

The tragic comedy dramatizes the question of identity and belonging for former Turkish guest workers in Germany and their descendants. The film opened in German cinemas on 10 March and was the fourth most successful German film of 2011 with 1.5 million viewers.

== Plot ==
Canan Yılmaz, a 22-year-old Turkish German begins to narrate the story of how her grandfather came to Germany in the 1960s as the 1,000,001st worker under the gastarbeiter program. She is pregnant with the child of her British boyfriend David but she has not told the family yet.

The story cuts to the modern day. Her grandparents, much to the behest of Grandfather Hüseyin, are obtaining German passports that same day. Hüseyin worries that they will lose their culture and be forced to assimilate. Six year-old Cenk Yılmaz, the cousin of Canan, begins to question his identity in his German school one day when he isn't chosen for either the German or the Turkish soccer team. He is the son of Ali, of Turkish heritage, and his German wife, Gabi, and Cenk cannot speak Turkish.

At a family meal his Grandmother Fatma presents to the family their newly acquired German passports, which Hüseyin dismisses as just a scrap of paper. At the same meal, Grandfather Hüseyin tells the family that he has bought a house in Turkey that he wants to use as a summer home. In order to renovate the house, he wants to travel to Turkey with the whole family.

The discussion makes Cenk curious about his family origins. Canan explains how Grandfather Hüseyin and his family were living in Turkey, how Hüseyin traveled to Germany and eventually brought his family with him. The youngest children are scared because they think Communion is cannibalism, but look forward to drinking Coca-Cola. The story switches between the 1960s and the present day, how the kids adapted to life and learned the language.

Together, the family flies to Turkey where they rent a bus to drive to their old hometown in East Anatolia to see their new house. Hüseyin guesses that Canan is pregnant and reacts with understanding. Hüseyin receives an invitation to give a speech at an official thank-you ceremony for guest workers at Bellevue Palace. After driving further, Hüseyin suddenly dies and since he recently received German citizenship, Turkish authorities refuse to allow him to be buried in a Muslim cemetery. Instead, the family brings his body to his old hometown and they bury him there. Cenk sees all the generations of his family in their various ages collected around the grave.

The house bought by Hüseyin turns out to be a ruin. His son, Muhamed, decides to stay in Turkey to rebuild it, since he is unemployed in Germany. The rest of the family returns to Germany. Cenk gives the speech that Hüseyin prepared in front of Chancellor Angela Merkel.

== Cast ==
- Aylin Tezel as Canan
- Rafael Koussouris as Cenk
- Vedat Erincin as Hüseyin
- Fahri Yardım as Hüseyin (young)
- Lilay Huser as Fatma
- Demet Gül as Fatma (young)
- Aykut Kayacık as Veli
- Aycan Vardar as Veli (young)
- Ercan Karacayli as Muhamed
- Kaan Aydogdu as Muhamed (young)
- Şiir Eloğlu as Leyla
- Aliya Artuc as Leyla (young)
- Petra Schmidt-Schaller as Gabi
- Denis Moschitto as Ali
- Axel Milberg as a German official
- Tim Seyfi as a vegetable trader
- Aglaia Szyszkowitz as a doctor
- Katharina Thalbach as a woman in the subway
- Saskia Vester as a neighbour

== Awards ==
- 2011 German Film Award Deutscher Filmpreis for Best Script in Gold and Best Film in Silver
