= We Might as Well Be Dead =

We Might As Well Be Dead
- Berlinale release poster
- Directed by: Natalia Sinelnikova
- Written by: Natalia Sinelnikova; Viktor Gallandi
- Produced by: Charlene Gürntke; Lina Mareike Zopfs
- Starring: Ioana Iacob; Pola Geiger
- Production companies: Heartwake Films produces Kojoten Filmproduktion; Film University Babelsberg Konrad Wolf
- Distributed by: Hope Runs High
- Release date: 11 February 2022 (Berlin International Film Festival)
- Running time: 93 minutes
- Countries: Germany; Romania
- Languages: German; Polish

We Might As Well Be Dead (German: Wir könnten genauso gut tot sein) is a 2022 German-Romanian satirical comedy-drama film directed by Natalia Sinelnikova (in her directorial debut) and written by Sinelnikova & Viktor Gallandi. It stars Ioana Iacob and Pola Geiger.

== Plot ==
The film is set in an isolated high-rise residential complex on a fenced, park-like property in a forest, creating a secluded utopia. The community is close-knit and personal, celebrating holidays together. The apartments are highly coveted, and a strict selection process decides new admissions. The Polish woman Anna Wilczyńska serves as the security officer, stationed at the building entrance and announcing events and weather reports over a public address system.

When the janitor Gerti's dog mysteriously disappears, the harmonious coexistence unravels. Anna's 16-year-old daughter Iris is convinced she has the Evil Eye because she had wished something bad upon the dog. She locks herself in the bathroom, refusing to leave, believing this will protect others. She also has nightmares and fears they might come true. One night, when Anna tries to reassure herself about Iris' fears and spies on a couple, she is seen but not recognized, and is mistaken for a burglar and voyeur. The dog is never found, but Gerti finds another dead animal and claims it is his dog. Fear spreads, despite Anna calling for calm.

Some residents believe Anna can no longer guarantee the building's safety, and with Gerti further spreading fear and suggesting the culprit might be one of the residents, the familial atmosphere is shattered. A neighborhood watch is formed, and it is decided that all residents must undergo a new selection process. Anna, increasingly marginalized, is terrified of this, especially since Iris' behavior further unsettles the neighbors.

Anna plants evidence of the "burglary" on Wolfram, an unsuccessful poet living in the boiler room who peddles his books in the building's elevator during the day. When this is discovered, he is expelled by the neighborhood watch. Anna feels secure, but to her disappointment, the re-evaluation of all residents continues. A loud nocturnal altercation with Iris leads to both being evicted. As they walk away from the building, they encounter the Richards family in the forest, who had unsuccessfully applied for an apartment at the beginning of the film.

== Cast ==
- Ioana Iacob as Anna Wilczynska
- Pola Geiger as Iris Anna Wilczynska
- Jörg Schüttauf as Gerti Posner
- Şiir Eloğlu as Ursel
- Susanne Wuest as Erika Drescher
- Knut Berger as Martin Drescher
- Moritz Jahn as Wolfram Mantel
- Mina Sadic as Zeynep
- Felix Jordan as Niklas Drescher

== Release ==
Fortissimo Films acquired the international sales rights to the film in January 2022. The film premiered at the Berlin International Film Festival on 11 February 2022 as the opening film of the Perspektive Deutsches Kino section. The film went on to win the Best International Cinematography award at the Tribeca Film Festival before being acquired in December 2022 for North American release by Hope Runs High in association with Aspect Ratio. The US trailer premiered with Filmmaker Magazine with a set theatrical release date of May, 26th 2023.

== Reception ==
Chase Hutchinson of Collider rated the film an "A". Sharai Bohannon of Dread Central rated the film 3.5 stars out of 5, writing, "It’s a fine film that provides a couple of laughs and plays on that mistrust of our neighbors that most of us have. It flirts with a few different genres before deciding to keep it light." The film received positive reviews in ScreenAnarchy and Screen International while also winning favorable comparisons to the films of Yorgos Lanthimos and being hailed as "an ace feature debut" by The New York Times.
