= Süperseks =

- Theatrical release poster
- Directed by: Torsten Wacker
- Written by: Kerim Pamuk; Daniel Schwarz
- Produced by: Nina Bohlmann; Babette Schröder
- Starring: Denis Moschitto; Marie Zielcke; Hilmi Sözer; Meral Perin
- Cinematography: André Lex
- Edited by: Anja Pohl
- Music by: Florian Tessloff
- Production companies: Magnolia Filmproduktion; Valerian Film; Studio Babelsberg Motion Pictures; Zweites Deutsches Fernsehen
- Distributed by: Warner Bros. Pictures
- Release date: 9 September 2004
- Running time: 96 minutes
- Country: Germany
- Languages: German; Turkish

Süperseks is a 2004 German comedy film directed by Torsten Wacker.

== Cast ==
- Denis Moschitto as Elviz
- Marie Zielcke as Anna
- Hilmi Sözer as Tarik
- Meral Perin as Dilek
- Jenny Ostermann as Canan
- Emine Sevgi Özdamar as Mutter Gülbahar
- Meray Ülgen as Cengiz
- Martin Glade as Olaf
- Laura Maire as Yasemin
- Hülya Duyar as Nilüfer, Hotline-Chefin
- Buket Yeni as Schuh-Girl Nurten
- Nezâ Selbuz as PKK-Filiz
- Belhe Zaimoğlu as Hülya
- Aykut Kayacık as Broccoli-Ahmet
- Naci Özarslan as Friseur Erkan
- Yaşar Çetin as Schuh-Freund Osman
- Kerim Pamuk as Sprüche-Yılmaz
- Peter Lohmeyer as Porno-Schneyder
- Tayfun Bademsoy as Dr. Kemal Tuncay
