= Sema Meray =

German-Turkish actress and author (born 1968)

Sema Meray (born 26 February 1968) is a Turkish actress and author.

Born in Mersin, Turkey, Meray grew up in Germany. She became known to a wider audience when she took over the role of Helga Schrader in the WDR TV series Die Anrheiner in 1998. She retained this role until 2003. She is occasionally seen in Lindenstraße as Aunt Hatice. Meray also works as a theatre actress, as an author and in lipsyncing.

In February 2008, her theatre performed Wegen der Ehre, along with Vedat Erincin, directed by Till Rickelt in an outdoor workshop at the Free Workshop of the Cologne Theatre. In this piece, the actress who plays her is her daughter Lilli Hollunder.

Meray is also committed to the preservation of the Mor Gabriel Monastery in Turkey.

In early 2014, Meray married her partner, Hubertus, Prinz von Sayn-Wittgenstein-Berleburg, and currently lives with him at Strauweiler Castle in Odenthal in the Bergisches Land.

== Filmography (selection) ==
- 1997: Unter uns
- 1999–2003: Die Anrheiner (recurring)
- 2002: Tatort – Schützlinge (TV series)
- 2003: Die Sitte – Flüstertöne
- 2004: Cologne P.D. – Tod am Bau
- 2005–2011: In aller Freundschaft (recurring)
- 2006–2011: Lindenstraße (recurring)
- 2008: Evet, I Do!
- 2010: Stolberg – Bei Anruf Mord
- 2010: Tatort – Schmale Schultern
- 2012: Storm of Love
- 2014–2015: Rote Rosen
