= Funda Vanroy =

German television presenter and actress

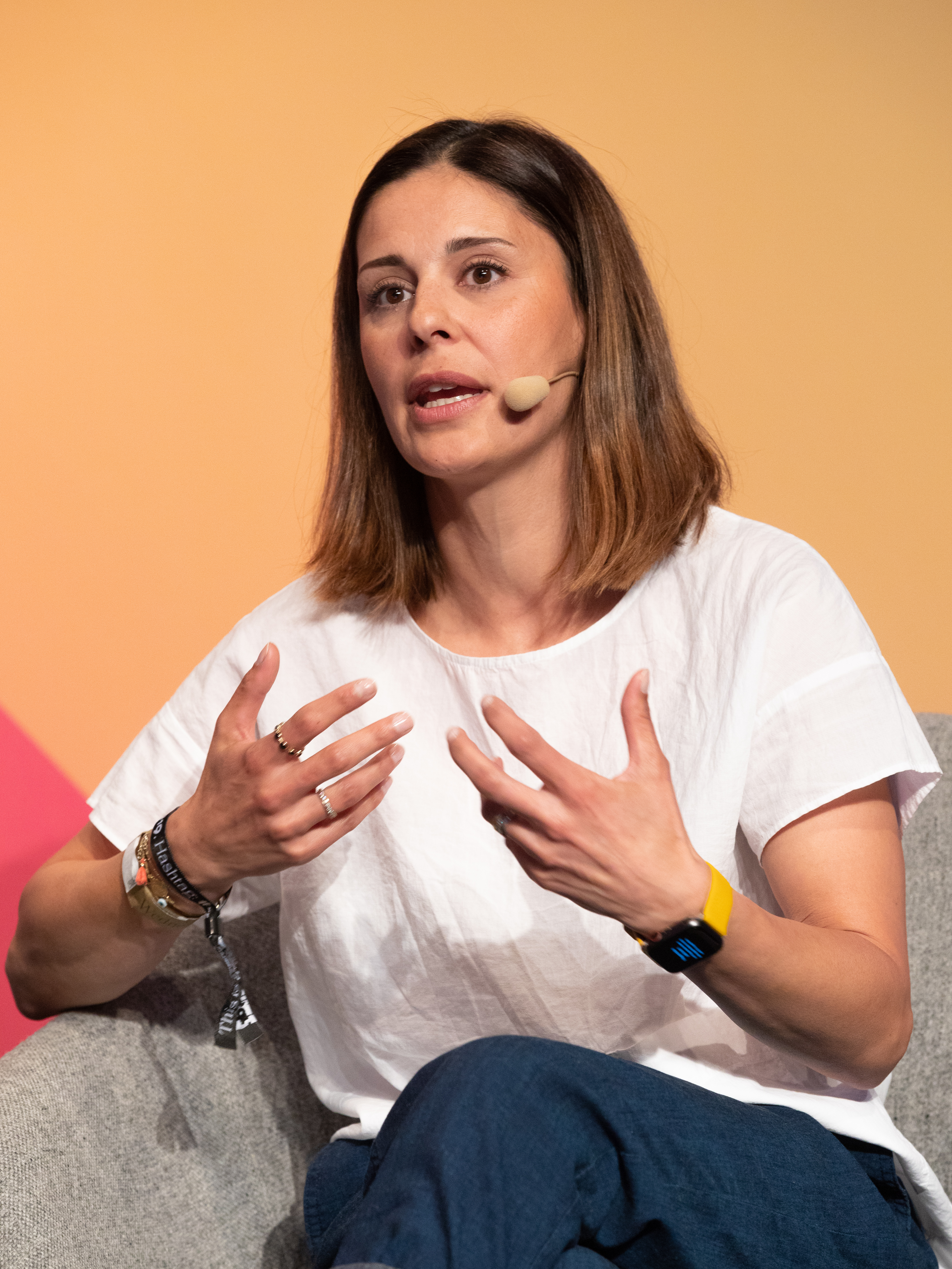
- Vanroy in 2019
- Born: 24 January 1977 (age 48); Gaildorf, West Germany
- Occupations: Television presenter; actress
- Website: vanroy.tv

Funda Vanroy (born 24 January 1977) is a German television presenter and actress.

== Life and career ==
Born in Gaildorf, West Germany, Vanroy is of Turkish and Azerbaijani descent. She spent most of her life in Munich, where she grew up shortly after birth. After Mittlere Reife, she worked at the Deutsche Bank and later at the Süddeutscher Verlag.

In 2002, she made her first experience on camera in CityHeat!-TV at the Munich local broadcaster CityInfo (now München 2) and was a reporter for the programme until 2004. From 2005 to 2007 she worked as a quiz channel moderator, from 2005 mainly on the programme Night-Loft on ProSieben and incidentally also for call-in broadcasts on 9Live, later only on Night-Loft on ProSieben.

In 2007 she finished the aforementioned activity. Since 2008 she became known as a reporter on the ProSieben show Galileo. In 2011, Vanroy hosted the reportage series on ProSieben Wild Wedding – JA ich will, aber schrill. In November 2011, she participated in Das perfekte Promi-Dinner. In the same month she joined VOX as a presenter in the documentary soap Wohnen nach Wunsch – Das Haus, taking over six out of ten cases.

In June 2012, she also took over a post as presenter at Galileo. Vanroy moderates Galileo Wissensreise in the studio every Saturday and is also the successor of Eva Mähl's representation of Airman Abdallah and Stefan Gödde. On the occasion of the Tolerance Day campaign broadcast on ProSieben, she was in front of the camera together with Simon Gosejohann in February 2013 and reported on how Germans think about foreigners and immigrants.

Since September 2013, and thus since the launch of ProSieben Maxx, where she also reported live on all six ProSiebenSat.1 Media channels from the red carpet, and hosts the knowledge magazine Galileo 360° on Thursdays at 8.15 pm.

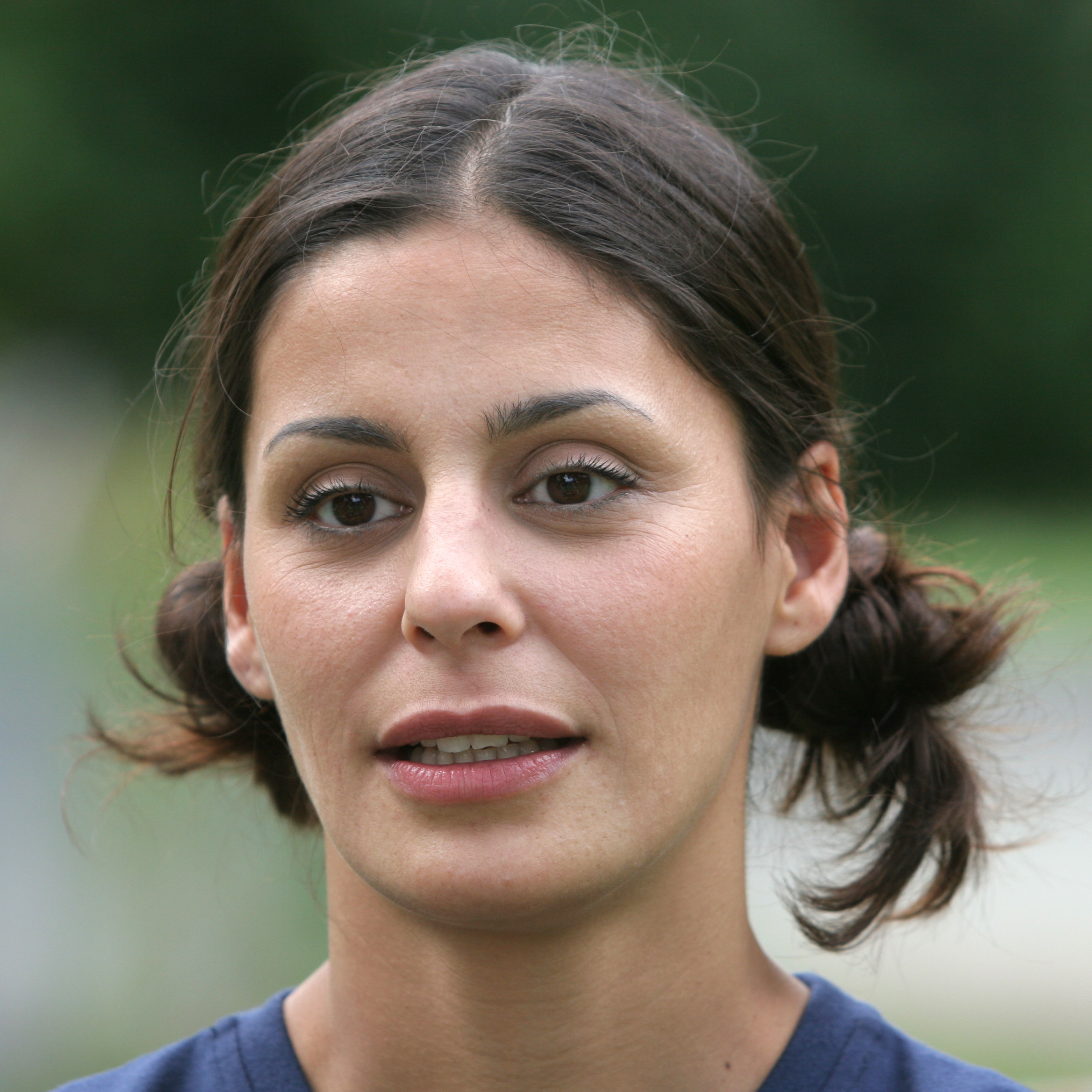
Vanroy in 2009

In addition to her first appearances on television, Vanroy also learned to act. In addition to her work on TV she moderated events, she stood for the Nicolaidis Stiftung, which she also supports herself, as well as for various Audi events, at CeBIT and also at the Marchon Crystal Sky Award 2011 on the stage. Among other things, she moderated the IDIZEM Dialog-Preis and was a surprise speaker in the Bavarian State Parliament at the Bavarian Integration Prize.

In addition to her moderation work, she was also seen in smaller roles in some ZDF television series, such as 2009 in Aktenzeichen XY… ungelöst or 2010 in Ein Fall für zwei, Der Kriminalist and Der Landarzt.

In July 2009, she also posed for the men's magazine FHM.

Vanroy lives with her husband Sanjiv Singh, the former managing director of Lacoste and now a member of the board of Liebeskind Berlin GmbH, and her daughter on a property in the Munich area.

== Television broadcasting activities ==
- 2002–04: CityHeat!-TV (as reporter)
- 2005–07: Night-Loft (as moderator)
- 2005: Various call-in programmes at 9Live (as moderator)
- Since 2008: Galileo (as reporter and studio presenter)
- 2009: Solitary (as participant)
- 2011: Wild Wedding – JA ich will, aber schrill (as moderator)
- 2011: Perfekten Promi-Dinner (as participant)
- 2011–12: Wohnen nach Wunsch – Das Haus (as moderator)
- 2012: Destination Kanada on Sport1 (as moderator)
- Since 2012: Galileo Wissensreise (as studio presenter)
- 2013: Tolerance Day (as moderator)
- 2013: Transmission start of ProSieben Maxx (as moderator)
- Since 2013: Galileo 360° (as studio presenter)
- 2013–14: TV Total Stock Car Crash Challenge

== Filmography ==
- 2004–08: Various advertising records and short films for dffb and Berlin 36
- 2009: Aktenzeichen XY… ungelöst – Wrong Fifties – The Methods of Counterfeiters (as Susanne)
- 2010: Ein Fall für zwei – Offenders and Victims (as Mrs. Siebert)
- 2010: Der Kriminalist – The Shadow (as Jogger)
- 2010: Der Landarzt – Thick Air (as Mrs. Ocker)
- 2016: Jack the Ripper: The London Slasher (as Prostitute Mary Jane Kelly)
