= Offroad.TV =

- Country of origin: Germany

Offroad.TV is a German television series.

== See also ==
- List of German television series
