= Tayfun Bademsoy =

Turkish actor (born 1958)

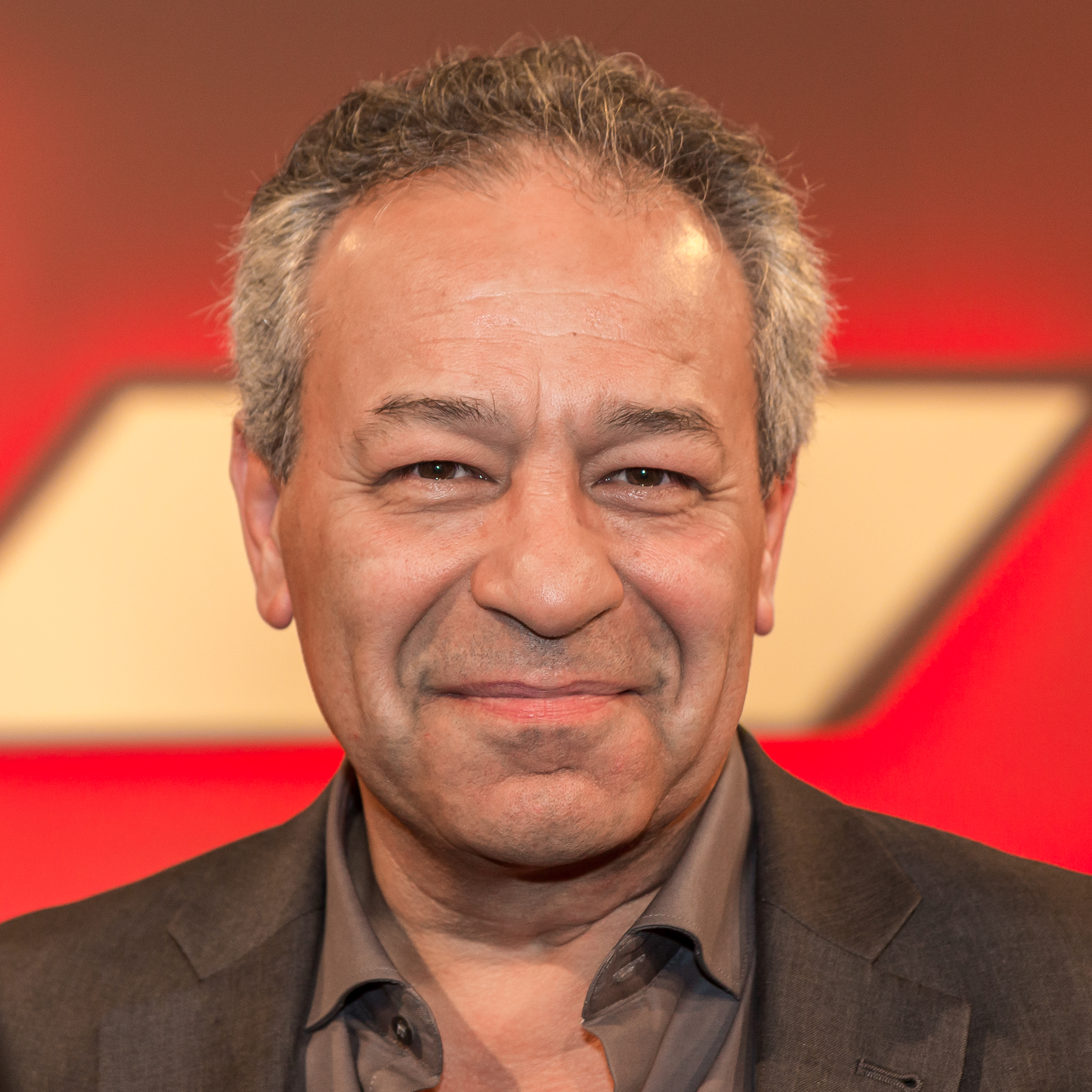
- Bademsoy in 2017
- Born: 14 October 1958 (age 67); Mersin, Turkey
- Occupation: Actor
- Years active: 1979–present

Tayfun Bademsoy (born 14 October 1958) is a Turkish-born German actor who currently has over 250 TV and cinema productions. He is known for his appearance in many crime-scene series. In his first Hollywood role, he played the role of Atlantic Records founder Ahmet Ertegun in the movie Beyond the Sea. Bademsoy is also the voice actor who serves as the character Sayid's German voice in the American TV series Lost.

== Biography ==
He is the son of a Turkish immigrant who came to Berlin, Germany, in 1969 to work. In 1980, he and his mother, Sabahat Bademsoy, appeared in leading roles in the television film Zuhause unter Fremden, produced for the SFB television channel. He subsequently continued his career in film and television.

In 1979, he graduated from the Martin-Buber-Oberschule in Berlin. The following year, he enrolled at Technical University of Berlin, where he studied for ten semesters. He gained wider recognition in 1983 for his performance as a Turkish youth in Klassen Feind, a stage adaptation directed by Peter Stein. He subsequently performed at major theatres, including the Frankfurter Schauspielhaus and Berlin's Renaissance Theater.

In addition to acting, he has worked as a voice actor in films and in radio plays. In 1995, he founded an agency representing foreign actors in Germany and managed it for ten years. He has also worked on short films, commercials and image films. He has continued his stage work since 2010.

Bademsoy began his acting career with a leading role in the television film Zuhause unter Fremden, produced by Sender Freies Berlin. In Peter Stein's 1983 stage production of Klassen Feind, and later in the Klassen Feind (film), he played a Turkish student who engages in verbal confrontations with his classmates while they wait for their teacher, who never arrives.

Since 1979, Bademsoy has appeared in more than 350 television and film productions, predominantly crime series, including several episodes of Tatort.

== Filmography ==
=== Films ===
- Zuhause unter Fremden (1978, TV film)
- The Man in Pyjamas (1981)
- Class Enemy (1983)
- Fire for the Big Dragon (1984, TV film)
- Treffer (1984)
- Die Abschiebung (1985, TV film)
- Schmetterlinge (1988)
- Noel Baba (1989, TV film)
- Ich liebe Deutschland (1991, TV film)
- Heart in the Hand (1992)
- Gefährliche Verbindung (1993, TV film)
- Reise in die Nacht (1998, TV film)
- Tuareg (1999, Short)
- Anam (2001)
- Lassie (2002, Short)
- Liebe Zartbitter (2002, TV film)
- Zoe's Arkadas (2002)
- Süperseks (2004)
- Beyond the Sea (2004)
- Zeit der Wünsche (2004, TV film)
- Maria an Callas (2006)
- Pandora's Box (2008)
- Thank You Mr. President (2008, Short)

=== TV series ===
- Tatort (Voll auf Hass) (1987)
- Magic (1990, 4 Episodes)
- Ein starkes Team (1994–2009, 40 Episodes)
- Tatort (Der Entscheider) (1996)
- Die Straßen von Berlin (1998)
- Schimanski (Schimanski muß leiden) (2000)
- Polizeiruf 110 (2001–2011, 15 episodes)
- Tatort (Zielscheibe) (2001)
- Club der Träume (2002)
- Eva Blond - ...und die vierzig Räuber (2003)
- Tatort (Baum der Erlösung) (2008)

== Personal life ==
His mother Sabahat Bademsoy has played alongside Bademsoy in various German TV series such as Tatort. His sister Aysun Bademsoy is a documentary film maker living in Germany.
