= Aykut Kayacık =

Turkish-German actor (born 1962)

Kayacık in 2016
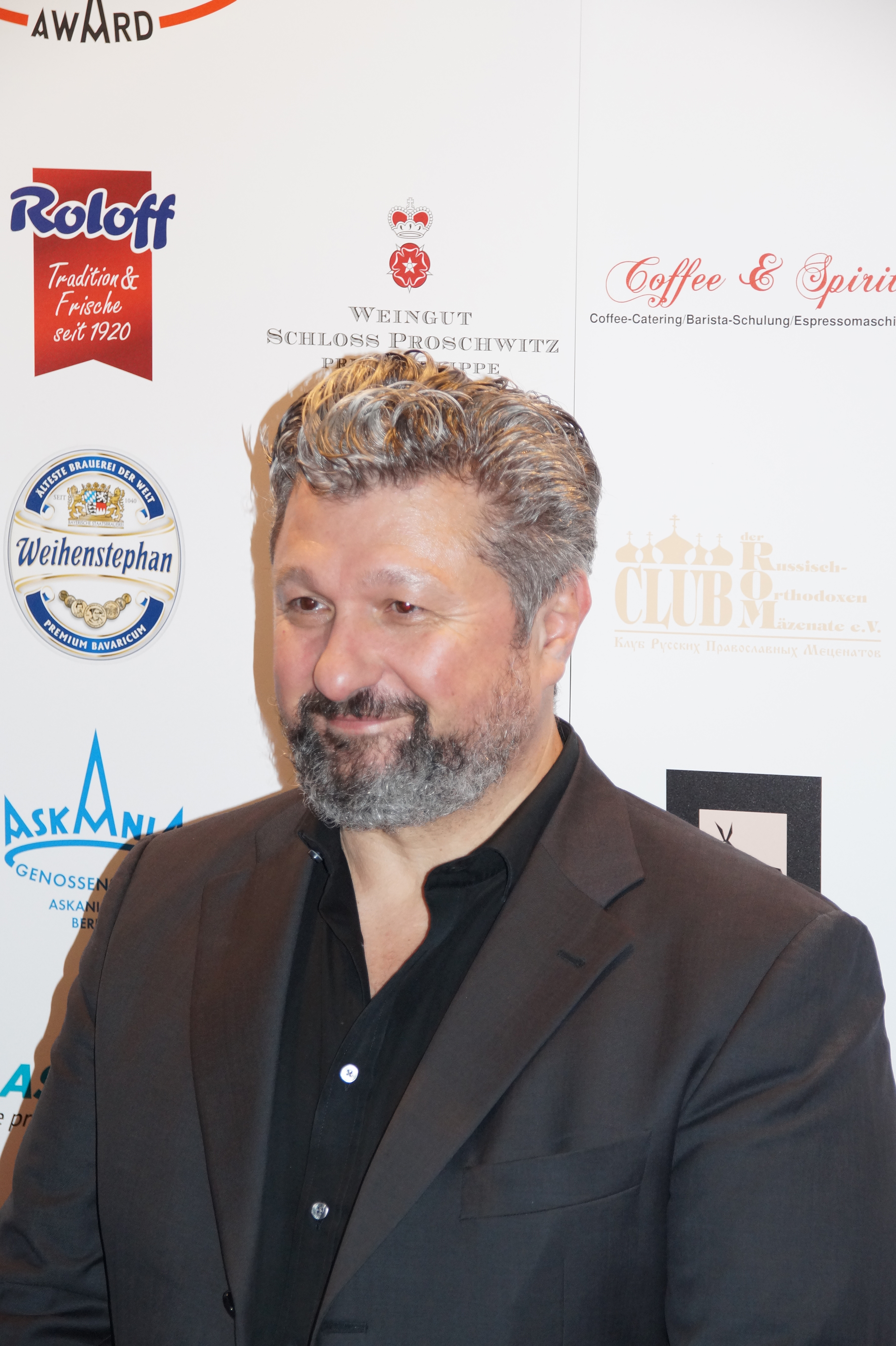
- Born: Aykut Kayacık; 1962 (age 63–64); Turkey
- Other name: Aykut Kaycik
- Years active: 1991–present
- Website: http://www.aykut-kayacik.de/

Aykut Kayacık (born 1962) is a Turkish-German actor.

== Partial filmography ==
- Superstau (1991) - Alpinist
- All Lies (1992) - Türsteher
- Dunkle Schatten der Angst (1993)
- Toms Zimmer (1995) - Barbesitzer
- Aufstand der Sandkörner (1996, Short)
- Dunckel (1998, TV Movie) - Polizist #1
- Lola and Billy the Kid (1999) - Bili's Friend
- Otto – Der Katastrophenfilm (2000)
- Trust Me (2000) - Erol
- England! (2000)
- Female 2 Seeks Happy End (2001)
- Viktor Vogel – Commercial Man (2001) - Zauberer
- The Middle of Nowhere (2001) - Dixi-Klo-Fahrer
- What to Do in Case of Fire? (2001) - Bülent
- Inspektor Rolle (2002-2004, TV series) - Orkan Örsey
- Soloalbum (2003)
- Süperseks (2004) - Broccoli Ahmet
- Neuschwanstein Conspiracy (2005, Short)
- Grosse Lügen (2007)
- Blindflug (2007) - Schrotthändler
- The Hunt for Troy (2007, TV film) - Saffet Pasha
- Viviere (2007) - Enrico Conchiglia
- Janjan (2007) - Ahmet
- Made in Europe (2007)
- Fast Track: No Limits (2008) - Sal
- Evet, I Do! (2009) - Boskin
- Gurbet – Fremde Heimat (2010) - Peter Klotzbach
- Takiye: Allah yolunda (2010) - Leiter Jimpa-Büro
- Vater Morgana (2010) - Fazeli
- Almanya: Welcome to Germany (2011) - Veli
- Zenne Dancer (2011) - Zindan
- Offroad (2012) - Taxifahrer
- Bliss (2012) - Freund Metzgerin (uncredited)
- Glanz & Gloria (2012) - Captain Warnecke
- Heiter bis wolkig (2012) - Taxifahrer
- 300 Worte Deutsch (2013) - Emre
- Das kleine Gespenst (2013) - Burgverwalter
- Willkommen bei Habib (2013) - Feridun
- The White Horse Inn (2013) - Chefkoch
- The Physician (2013) - Shah Official
- Das schaffen wir schon (2017) - Erdogan
