= Wohnen nach Wunsch =

- Country of origin: Germany

Wohnen nach Wunsch is a German television series.

== See also ==
- List of German television series
