= Nezâ Selbuz =

Turkish-German actress (born 1967)

- Born: Nezâ Selbuz; January 2, 1967 (age 59)
- Years active: 1995–present

Nezâ Selbuz (born January 2, 1967) is a Turkish-German actress.

== Filmography ==
Film
Year	Film	Role	Notes
2004	Folge der Feder!	Susan	
2004	Süperseks	Filiz	
2000	Tour Abroad	Klagefrau	
2000	Just Messing About		
1999	The Devil and Ms. D	Maria Callas	
1998	Kurz und schmerzlos	Dancer	
1998	Pastry, Pain and Politics	Hayat	
