= Demet Gül =

German-Turkish actress (born 1982)

Demet Gül (born 1982, Stuttgart, West Germany) is a German-Turkish actress.

== Life and career ==
Gül grew up as a daughter of Turkish immigrants in Stuttgart. She completed her theatre study at the Otto Falckenberg School of the Performing Arts in Munich and worked on several productions of the Bayerische Theaterakademie August Everding and the Bavarian State Opera as an actress. She played one of the main roles in the feature film Almanya: Welcome to Germany (2011).

== Filmography (selection) ==
- 2011: Almanya: Welcome to Germany
- 2013: A Spicy Kraut
- 2014: Ulan İstanbul - Turkish series
- 2016: Ask Laftan Anlamaz - Turkish series
- 2018: Arka Sokaklar - Turkish Series
- 2021: Akrep - Turkish Series
