= Stadtklinik =

- Country of origin: Germany

Stadtklinik is a German television series.

== Plot ==
In a Cologne hospital, which is also called Stadtklinik, doctors and nurses face daily medical and human problems. In addition, there are competitions, love affairs and intrigues among colleagues. Medical controversy is the order of the day for the city's clinic, as are social controversies here, for example in questions of euthanasia.

Firstly, Professor Dr. Wilhelm Himmel the head of the hospital, later he is replaced by Professor Baaden.

== See also ==
- List of German television series
