= Das Geheimnis meines Vaters =

- Genre: Drama
- Starring: Anna Voy Kunity Sven Waasner Heike Trinker
- Theme music composer: Andreas Dicke, Thomas Onderka
- Country of origin: Germany
- Original language: German
- No. of seasons: 1
- No. of episodes: 49

Production
- Producer: Kerstin Ramcke
- Running time: 25 minutes
- Production company: Studio Hamburg Production

Original release
- Network: Das Erste
- Release: 15 August – 10 November 2006

Das Geheimnis meines Vaters (The Secret of My Father) is a German television series. The telenovella was broadcast from 15 August to 10 November 2006 on Das Erste.

== Background ==
Das Geheimnis meinses Vaters was produced by Studio Hamburg Produktion GmbH and commissioned by ARD-Werbung. The telenovela, set in the world of a soap and perfume manufacturer, was created by head writers Markus Stromiedel and Frank Hemjeoltmanns, with Karen Müller serving as the chief director. Filming took place from July 3 to August 29 2006, in Hamburg (studio) and Wismar (on-location shooting). The series was notable for being the first daily series broadcast in a 16:9 widescreen format. However, it was not continued due to unsatisfactory ratings from the broadcaster.

== Storyline ==
The storyline of Das Geheimnis meines Vaters revolves around Jule, a 27-year-old woman who returns to her hometown of Wismar after her father mysteriously disappears. Determined to find him, she throws herself into the investigation, which leads her to discover the love of her life. Along the way, Jule uncovers a family secret—one that ties directly to her, making her the key to unraveling the mystery.

== Other info ==
The series is available in its entirety on DVD. Anna Voy Kunith, Sven Waasner, and Heike Trinker were the only actors to appear in all 49 episodes. Kai Albrecht (15 episodes) and Hartmut Volle (22 episodes) had the fewest appearances, while René Schoenenberger had the fewest lines, as his character was in a coma for about 25 episodes.

Several actors from the series have also appeared in other telenovelas. Anna Voy Kunith and Kai Albrecht previously starred in Sophie - Braut wider Willen (2006); Igor Jeftić was in Verliebt in Berlin (2007); Knud Riepen (2007-2008), Astrid Posner (2008), and Kai Albrecht (2009-2010) appeared in Rote Rosen; Heike Jonca was part of Anna und die Liebefrom 2008 to 2012, and Helmut Rühl also appeared in 2008. Heike Trinker (2008-2009), Mareike Lindenmeyer (2012-2013), and Kai Albrecht (2014-2016) were regular cast members on Sturm der Liebe, with Sven Waasner joining the cast in 2020. Andi Slawinski appeared in Alisa - Folge deinem Herzen in 2009. Additionally, Christian Rogler made a guest appearance as Dr. Robrahn in episodes 8-44.

== Cast ==
Actor	Character Name	Series
Anna Voy Kunith	Jule Kämpe, adopt., geb. Paula Kämpe	1–49
Sven Waasner	Kai Feldmann	1–49
Kai Albrecht	Nick Berger	1, 5, 15-26, 49
Heike Jonca	Christa Jannsen	1–49
Mareike Lindenmeyer	Sandra Locke	1–49
Christian Pätzold	Georg Kämpe	1–49
Astrid Posner	Kirsten Reinecke	1–49
René Schoenenberger	Oskar Kämpe	1, 5–49
Andi Slawinski	Thorsten Kämpe	1–49
Heike Trinker	Ingrid Kämpe, geb. Grabow	1–49
Knud Riepen	Helge Blechschmidt	1–49
Helmut Rühl	Bodo Weckert	2–49
Hartmut Volle	Wolfgang Feldmann	2–3, 7, 14-49
Reinhard Krökel	Gustav „Scholle“ Scholz	3–45, 49
Karsten Dahlem	Pit Harms	3–33, 41–49
Rainer Winkelvoss	Manfred Esser	3–49
Igor Jeftić	Robert Steinbrenner	4–49
