= Okun =

Okun may refer to:

== People ==
- Arthur Melvin Okun (1928–1980), American economist
- Brackish Okun, fictional character in the 1996 film Independence Day
- Edward Okuń (1872–1945), Polish artist
- Herbert S. Okun (1930–2011), American diplomat
- Lev Okun (1929–2015), Russian physicist
- Michael S. Okun American neurologist, neuroscientist and author
- Milt Okun (1923–2016), American music arranger
- Noam Okun (born 1978), Israeli professional tennis player
- Ronald Okun (born 1932), American pharmacologist
- Sasha Okun (1949–2025), Soviet-born Israeli artist, author and educator
- Sid Okun (1912–1986), American activist

== Other ==
- Okun's law
- Okun people

== See also ==
- Russell Okung (born 1988), American football player
