= Silhan Özçelik =

British convicted terrorist

- Born: 1996 (age 29–30); London, England
- Known for: Arrest and conviction on terrorism charges for planning to join the PKK
- Criminal penalty: 21 months at young offender institution

Silhan Özçelik (born 1996) is a British woman of Kurdish Turkish descent from Highbury, London. In 2015 she was convicted of an offence under section 5 (1) (a) of the Terrorism Act 2006 after she travelled to Belgium with the intention to join the proscribed Kurdistan Workers' Party (the PKK).

== Biography ==
On 27 October 2014, Özçelik, aged 17, travelled to Brussels on the Eurostar, leaving a letter and video for her family stating that she had left to join the PKK and hoped to volunteer as a fighter against Islamic State. Her brother stated that "we are 100 per cent sure she has gone away to carry out humanitarian and charity work and not to become a fighter against [Isis]".

On 16 January 2015, Özçelik returned from Cologne, Germany, and upon landing at London Stansted Airport was arrested and bailed the following day. In March she was remanded in custody and a protest in support of her was held outside HM Holloway Prison.

In court Özçelik claimed to have lied to her parents about joining the PKK and had actually travelled to Brussels to see a man she was in a relationship with, which was "really shameful in our community". Özçelik was found guilty, and sentenced to 21 months in a young offender institution on 20 November 2015. She unsuccessfully appealed her case.
