= Okan Patirer =

Turkish actor

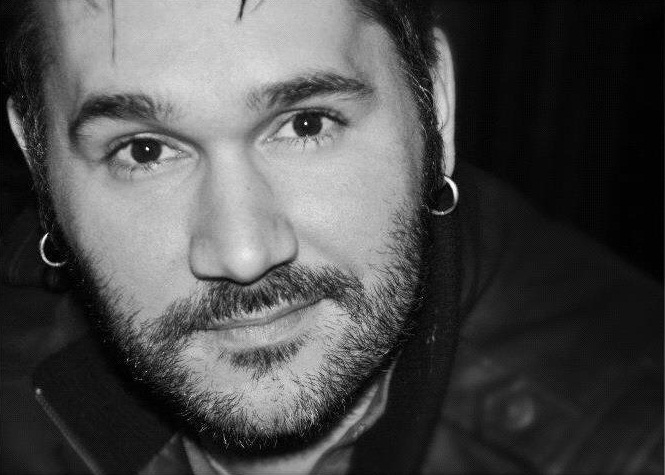
- Born: February 21, 1979 (age 46); Salzgitter, Germany
- Occupation: Actor
- Years active: 1997 - present

Okan Patirer (born 21 February 1979 in Salzgitter) is a Turkish actor.

== Filmography ==
Year	Title	Role	Notes
2008	Beşinci Boyut	İsmet	
2009	Hakkını Helal Et	Nedim	
2016	Darbe	İsmet	
2006	Memleket Hikayeleri - Cici Murat	Ercan	
2002	Kınalı Kar		
