= Alle lieben Jimmy =

- Also known as: Everybody Loves Jimmy
- Country of origin: Germany

Alle lieben Jimmy (Everybody Loves Jimmy) was a German comedy television series which was produced by Bavaria Film GmbH for RTL between 2005 and 2007.

== See also ==
- List of German television series
