= Vice Squad (TV series) =

- Die Sitte
- Country of origin: Germany

Die Sitte is a German television series.

== See also ==
- List of German television series
