= Arkadaş Theater =

German theater

Coordinates: 50°57′13″N 6°54′54″E

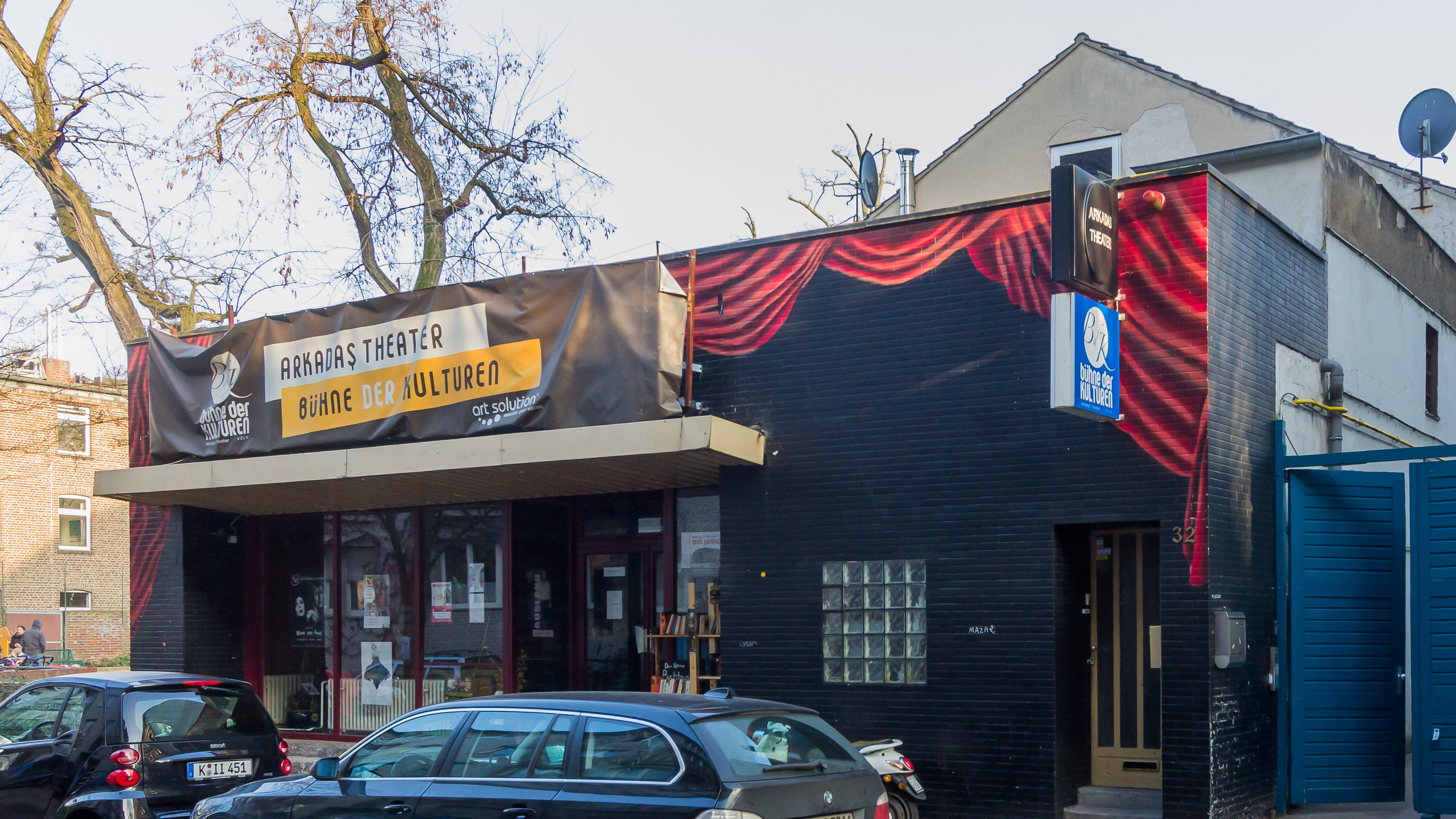
The Arkadaş Theater in 2015.

Arkadaş Theater is a theatre in Cologne, North Rhine-Westphalia, Germany.
