= Wupper-Theater =

Theatre in Wuppertal, North Rhine-Westphalia, Germany

Wupper-Theater is a theatre in Wuppertal, North Rhine-Westphalia, Germany.
