= Ercan Özçelik =

German actor

Ercan Oezcelik
- Born: 12 August 1966 (age 59); Ordu, Turkey.
- Other name: Ercan Özçelik

Ercan Özçelik (Ercan Oezcelik) (born 12 August 1966 in Ordu, Turkey) is a German actor with Turkish roots.

== Biography ==
Özçelik has worked with Hal Hartley (director), Jeff Goldblum, Parker Posey, Oliver Berben, Iris Berben, Ilja Richter, Michael Degen, Michael Karen, Demir Gökgöl and with many other great artists. He is working in German and international films - especially in comedies and dramas with black humor. Since 30 years he has been involved as an actor in German theaters of state, and in numerous international film & TV productions. For example; in the international movie FAY GRIM he played the detective-role (directed by Hal Hartley, with Jeff Goldblum, Parker Posey, etc.). Further the main role in THE DISAPPEARANCE (directed by Roger Deutsch/Gabor Holtai), and the main role of a chief commissioner in the famous ARD-TATORT series, as well as the lead role of a neurologist and surgeon in the RTL series DR. BRUCKNER.

His acting techniques are: a mix of Lee Strasberg („method“) and Dominique De Fazio („poetic theater“).

== Filmography (selected) ==
=== Films ===
- 1996: 5 Minuten Ikarus (SFB/Boomtown), director: Martin Eigler
- 1997: SADUJ (SFB/Boomtown), director: Martin Eigler
- 1997: Die Pointe (TwilightFilms), director: Jürgen Weber
- 2004: Illusion X, director: Martin Morlock
- 2004: Folge der Feder (moneypenny filmproduction), director: Nuray Sahin
- 2006: Fay Grim (ZeroFilm/Possiblefilms), director Hal Hartley
- 2008: Fünf Fische, zwei Brote, director: Alex Eslam
- 2009: Gangs (SamFilm), director: Rainer Matsutani
- 2016: The Disappearance / In The Same Garden (Ottofilms), director: Roger Deutsch, Gabor Holtai

=== Television ===
- 1990: Pfarrerin Lenau (SDR)
- 1993: Motzki (ARD), director: Thomas Nennstiel
- 1995: 1/2 Minuten (Studio Hamburg, ZDF), director: Rolf Schübel
- 1997: Reise in die Nacht (Eikon Media, ZDF), director: Matti Geschonneck
- 1998-1996: OP ruft Dr. Bruckner (Phoenix Film, RTL), director: Bielawa, Weber, Siebenmann, Bohn, u.a.
- 1999: Off Road (Berengar Pfahl Film, ARD), director: Michael Zenz
- 1999: Die Straßen von Berlin (Nova Film, ProSieben), director: Werner Masten
- 2000: Ein Vater im Alleingang (Calypso Film, Sat.1), director: Diethard Küster
- 2000-1999: Drehkreuz Airport (Nova Film, ZDF), director: Werner Masten
- 2001: The Beast (Moovie Entertainment, Sat.1), director: Oliver Berben
- 2001-2000: Die Pfefferkörner (Studio Hamburg, NDR), director: Matthias Steurer
- 2003-2001: Tatort (Maran Film, ARD), director: Oetzmann, Huber
- 2003: Eva Blond, director: Hermine Huntgeburth
- 2006: Kiss me Kismet (Rat Pack Film, ProSieben), director: Stefan Holtz
- 2007: Da kommt Kalle (Network Movie, ZDF), director: Lars Jessen
- 2007: Leipzig Homicide (UFA Film, ZDF), director: Oren Schmuckler
- 2008: GSG 9 – Ihr Einsatz ist ihr Leben (Typhoon Film, Sat.1), director: H.-G. Bücking
- 2009: Märchenstunde - 1001 Nacht (Rat Pack Film, ProSieben), director: Michael Karen
- 2011: Molly & Mops (Mungofilm, ZDF/ORF), director: Michael Karen

== Theater (selected) ==
- 1986 Zirkus, Die Insel/Badisches Staatstheater Karlsruhe, director: Kiumars Sharif
- 1986 Die Physiker, Die Insel/Badisches Staatstheater Karlsruhe, director: Kiumars Sharif
- 1987 Unsere kleine Stadt, Gengenbacher Freilichtspiele, director: Michael & Werner Wedekind
- 1988-89 Der Vogelkopp, Das Leben der Hilletje Jans, Blutsbrüder/Kinder- u. Jugendtheater Landesbühne Bruchsal, director: Parchwitz, Benkelmann, Printschitsch
- 1988 Bitterer Honig, Die Insel/Badisches Staatstheater Karlsruhe, director: Rolphe de la Croix (Schüler von Gustaf Gründgens)
- 1989–1990 Arturo Ui am Bremer Schauspielhaus, director: Andras Fricsay
- 1990 Geheime Freunde, Schillertheater Berlin, director: Airan Berg
- 1994 Katzelmacher am Nationaltheater Mannheim, director: Michael Wittenberg
- 1995 Dreigroschenlieder, Independent Productions, director: Selçuk Sazak
- 2004 Im Rausch der Tiefe, Independent Production, director: Ercan Oezcelik/Peter Bleckwehl

== Awards ==
For Die Pfefferkörner:

- 2001 Asia Pacific Broadcasting Union – The ABU Prize for Children's Programmes Television
- 2000 Golden Telix, in the Category: best Serial

For Folge der Feder!:

- 2004 International Filmfestival Mannheim-Heidelberg, Audience Award
- 2005 Ankara International Filmfestival, Best Director / Screenplay
- 2005 German Television Award, Best Cinematography

For Kiss me Kismet:

- Filmfestival Television in Baden-Baden, Prize of Jury; main Prize of the German Academy of Performing Arts; Audience Award by 3.sat
- 2007 Nomin. German Television Award
- 2007 Adolf-Grimme-Prize
