= Hülya Duyar =

Turkish actress

- Born: 26 June 1970 (age 56); Sivas, Turkey
- Citizenship: Turkey, Germany
- Occupation: Actress
- Years active: 2002–present

Hülya Duyar (born 26 June 1970) is a Turkish actress.

== Life ==
Duyar immigrated to Germany in 1978, when she was very young. In 1989, she completed her training as a hairdresser and became a make-up artist, initially at theatres. Here her talent as an actress was discovered, and she received numerous engagements all over Germany as well as abroad.

In 2000, she began her work on film and television. Her most notable movies are Süperseks (2004) and Zeit der Wünsche (2005). In addition to filming, she is also active in the fields of masking and casting.

== Filmography ==
=== As actress ===
Year	Title	Role	Notes
2002	Günlük	Frau Ott	TV film
2004	Süperseks	Hotline's boss	Film
2006	Janjan	Meryem	Film
2007	Made in Europe		Film
2009–2010	Bir Bulut Olsam	Fatma Bulut	seasons 1-2; TV series
2009	Evet, I Do!	Sülbiye	Film
2010–2011	Gönülçelen	Kadriye	seasons 1-2; TV series
2011	Zenne	Müjgan	Film
2012	Mutluluk	Friseurin	Film
2013–2016	Karagül	Emine	season 4; TV series
2014	Deliha	Fatma	Film
2014	Kuzu	Lütfiye	Film
2017	Evlat Kokusu	Müzeyyen	TV series
2017	Fazilet Hanım ve Kızları		TV series
2019	Sevgili Geçmiş	Afet	TV series
2019–2021	Doğduğun Ev Kaderindir	Sultan	TV series
2020	Eltilerin Savaşı		Film
2021	Stuck Apart	Rüya	Film
2021–2022	The Club	İsmet's mother	TV series
2022-2025	Yalı Çapkını	Şefika	TV series
2026	Kıskanmak	Döndü	TV series
2026	Nature Of Love	Adile	TV series

=== As producer ===
Year	Title	Role	Notes
2011	Zenne	co-producer	Film
2009	Türk Gibi Başla Alman Gibi Bitir	writer, producer	Film

=== As writer ===
Year	Title	Role	Notes
2009	Türk Gibi Başla Alman Gibi Bitir	writer	
