= Okan Özçelik =

Dutch footballer

Personal information
- Full name: Okan Özçelik
- Date of birth: 10 May 1992 (age 34)
- Place of birth: Utrecht, Netherlands
- Position: Winger

Youth career
- VV Maarssen
- FC Utrecht

Senior career*
Years	Team	Apps	(Gls)
2010–2012	USV Elinkwijk		
2012–2013	FC Chabab		
2013	Antalyaspor II	8	(3)
2013	Antalyaspor	1	(0)
2013–2014	USV Elinkwijk		
2014–2015	USV Hercules	19	(9)
2015	RKC Waalwijk	2	(0)
- * Club domestic league appearances and goals as of 6 September 2015

Okan Özçelik (born 10 May 1992) is a Dutch footballer who plays as a winger. He appeared in the Turkish Süper Lig for Antalyaspor and in the Dutch Eerste Divisie for RKC Waalwijk.
