= König von Kreuzberg =

- Country of origin: Germany

König von Kreuzberg is a German television series.

== See also ==
- List of German television series
