= Yasemin Şamdereli =

German film director, screen writer and actress

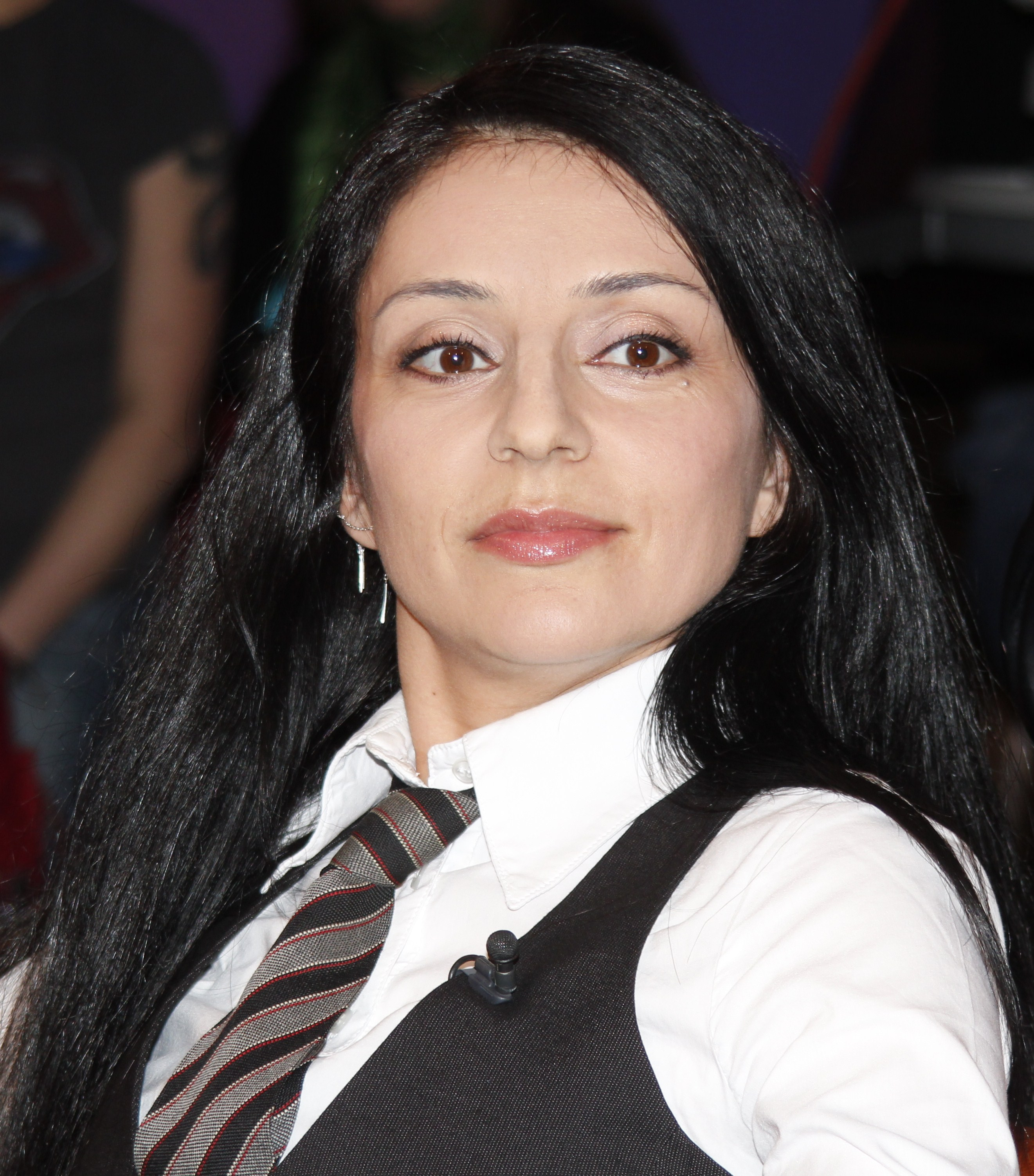
- Born: 15 July 1973 (age 52); Dortmund, West Germany

Yasemin Şamdereli (born 15 July 1973 in Dortmund, West Germany) is a German actress, screenwriter and film director. Her film Almanya - Willkommen in Deutschland had its U.S. premiere at the Berlin and Beyond Film Festival in San Francisco on 20 October 2011.

== Biography ==
Yasemin Şamdereli was born in Dortmund, West Germany on 15 July 1973, to a family of Kurdish Zaza origin. She studied at the University of Television and Film in Munich from 1993 until 2000. From 1994 to 1998, she worked as a freelance collaborator for Bavaria-Film. Until 2002 she worked as a directing assistant to international cinema films, including the Jackie Chan films Jackie Chan is Nobody (1998) and Spy against Will (2001).

== Career ==
In 2002 she directed the TV comedy Alles betürkt!. She was the co-writer of the successful television show, Turkish for Beginners. She also appeared as an actress in the short film Delicious in 2004. She was awarded the German Filmpreis in 2011 for her film, Almanya – Willkommen in Deutschland.

== Filmography ==
=== Actor ===
Film
Year	Film	Role
2012	Cinema 3	Herself
2011	The Fabulous Picture Show	Herself
2004	Delicious	Dianne

=== Director ===
Year	Film	Notes
1996	Kreuz & quer	Film
2000	Kismet	Film
2002	Alles getürkt!	TV
2004	Sextasy	Film
2007	Ich Chef du nix	TV
2011	Almanya - Willkommen in Deutschland	Film
2024	Samia	Film

=== Writer ===
Year	Film	Notes
2006	Türkisch für Anfänger	1 episode (Die, in der Axel ständig grün ist)
2004	Sextasy	
2002	Alles getürkt!	
2000	Kismet	
