= List of LGBTQ-related films of 1999 =

This is a list of lesbian, gay, bisexual, transgender or queer-related films released in 1999. It contains theatrically released films that deal with important gay, lesbian, bisexual, transgender or queer characters or issues and may have same-sex romance or relationships as a plot device.

== Films ==
Title	Director	Country	Genre	Cast	Notes
$30	Gregory Cooke	United States	Short, comedy	Sara Gilbert, Erik MacArthur and Gregory Itzin	A father buys his closeted son a night with a prostitute
24 Nights	Kieran Turner	United States	Comedy	Kevin Isola, Aida Turturro and Stephen Mailer	
After Stonewall	John Scagliotti	United States	Documentary		
Aimée & Jaguar	Max Färberböck	Germany	Romance, war, drama	Juliane Köhler, Maria Schrader, Johanna Wokalek, Elisabeth Degen, Heike Makatsch and Detlev Buck	Based on the book by Erica Fischer chronicling the lives of Lilly Wust and Felice Schragenheim during World War II
All About My Mother	Pedro Almodóvar	Spain; France	Drama	Cecilia Roth, Marisa Paredes, Antonia San Juan, Penélope Cruz and Candela Peña	
American Beauty	Sam Mendes	United States	Drama	Kevin Spacey, Annette Bening, Thora Birch, Chris Cooper	This film won the Academy Award for best picture.
Atomic Saké	Louise Archambault	Canada	Short drama	Audrey Benoit, Suzanne Clément, Noémie Godin-Vigneau	
The Attack of the Giant Moussaka	Panos H. Koutras	Greece	Comedy, sci-fi	Yannis Aggelakis, Myriam Vourou, Christos Mantakas. Gregory Patrikareas, Eugene Dimitriou and Themis Bazaka	
Beau travail	Claire Denis	France	Drama	Denis Lavant, Michel Subor and Grégoire Colin	Based on the novella Billy Budd by Herman Melville
Being John Malkovich	Spike Jonze	United States	Fantasy, comedy, drama	John Cusack, Cameron Diaz and Catherine Keener	John Malkovich and Charlie Sheen appear as themselves
Belle maman	Gabriel Aghion	France	Comedy	Catherine Deneuve, Line Renaud, Stéphane Audran	
Beloved/Friend (Amic/Amat)	Ventura Pons	Spain	Drama	Josep María Pou, Rosa Maria Sardà, Mario Gas, David Selvas and Irene Montalà	a.k.a. Beloved/Friend; based on the book Testament by Josep Maria Benet i Jornet
Below the Belt	Dominique Cardona, Laurie Colbert	Canada	Short drama	Nathalie Toriel, Cara Pifko, Tanja Jacobs	
Better Than Chocolate	Anne Wheeler	Canada	Romance, comedy	Wendy Crewson, Karyn Dwyer, Christina Cox, Ann-Marie MacDonald and Peter Outerbridge	
The Big Brass Ring	George Hickenlooper	United States	Drama	William Hurt, Nigel Hawthorne, Irene Jacob, Jefferson Mays and Miranda Richardson	The film's script was heavily rewritten by Hickenlooper and F. X. Feeney from a previous screenplay written in the early 1980s by Orson Welles and Oja Kodar
The Boondock Saints	Troy Duffy	United States	Crime, drama	Willem Dafoe, Sean Patrick Flanery, Norman Reedus, David Della Rocco and Billy Connolly	
Boys Don't Cry	Kimberly Peirce	United States	Crime, drama	Hilary Swank, Chloë Sevigny, Peter Sarsgaard, Brendan Sexton III and Alison Folland	Based on the real-life story of Brandon Teena
Burlesk King	Mel Chionglo	Philippines	Drama	Rodel Velayo, Leonardo Litton, Elizabeth Oropesa, Raymond Bagatsing and Cherry Pie Picache	2nd part of a trilogy about strippers in Manila's gay bars
But I'm a Cheerleader	Jamie Babbit	United States	Comedy, drama	Natasha Lyonne, Clea DuVall, Melanie Lynskey, RuPaul, Eddie Cibrian, Wesley Mann and Richard Moll	
Chutney Popcorn	Nisha Ganatra	United States	Comedy, drama	Nisha Ganatra, Jill Hennessy, Sakina Jaffrey and Madhur Jaffrey	
Chill Out	Andreas Struck	Germany	Drama	Tatjana Blacher, Sebastian Blomberg and Werner Heinrichmöller	
Creature	Parris Patton	United States	Documentary	Stacey "Hollywood" Dean, Filberto Ascencio, Butch Dean, Dusty Dean	Documentary by Parris Patton about trans woman Stacey Hollywood; a four-year chronicle of Stacey's transformation into womanhood, life in the West Hollywood LGBT nightclub scene, and her journey from Los Angeles back home to visit her conservative Christian family in North Carolina.
Cruel Intentions	Roger Kumble	United States	Drama, thriller	Sarah Michelle Gellar, Ryan Phillippe, Reese Witherspoon	Modern adaptation of the novel Les Liaisons dangereuses by Pierre Choderlos de Laclos
Deep Inside Clint Star	Clint Alberta	Canada	Documentary		
Le derrière	Valérie Lemercier	France	Comedy	Valérie Lemercier, Claude Rich, Dieudonné, Marthe Keller and Patrick Catalifo	
An Early Frost	Pierre Pinaud	France	Short, drama	Amandine Sroussi, Serpentine Teyssier and Laurent Manzoni	a.k.a. Gelée précoce
The Einstein of Sex: Life and Work of Dr. M. Hirschfeld	Rosa von Praunheim	Germany; Netherlands	History, drama	Friedel von Wangenheim, Ben Becker, Wolfgang Völz, Otto Sander and Meret Becker	
Election	Alexander Payne	United States	Comedy, drama	Matthew Broderick, Reese Witherspoon	Based on the novel by Tom Perrotta
External Affairs	Peter Moss	Canada	Drama	Victor Garber, Kenneth Welsh	TV movie
Fight Club	David Fincher	United States	Drama, thriller	Brad Pitt, Edward Norton, Helena Bonham Carter, Meat Loaf, and Jared Leto	Based on the novel of the same name by Chuck Palahniuk, it explores themes of homoeroticism.
The Five Senses	Jeremy Podeswa	Canada	Drama	Mary-Louise Parker, Gabrielle Rose, Molly Parker, Daniel MacIvor, Philippe Volter, Nadia Litz, Brendan Fletcher, Marco Leonardi, Pascale Bussières, Paul Soles, Richard Clarkin	
Flawless	Joel Schumacher	United States	Comedy, drama	Robert De Niro, Philip Seymour Hoffman, Barry Miller, Chris Bauer, Wilson Jermaine Heredia and Daphne Rubin-Vega	
Floating	William Roth	United States	Romance, drama	Norman Reedus, Chad Lowe, Will Lyman, Sybil Temchen and Casey Affleck	
Freeway II: Confessions of a Trickbaby	Matthew Bright	United States	Exploitation	Natasha Lyonne, Vincent Gallo, María Celedonio	
Friends & Lovers	George Haas	United States	Romance, drama	Stephen Baldwin, Danny Nucci, George Newbern, Alison Eastwood, Claudia Schiffer, Robert Downey Jr., Neill Barry, Suzanne Cryer	
Full Blast	Rodrigue Jean	Canada	Drama, musical	David La Haye, Martin Desgagné, Louise Portal, Marie-Jo Thério, Patrice Godin	Based on the novel L'Ennemi que je connais by Martin Pitre
Gendernauts - Eine Reise durch die Geschlechter	Monika Treut	Germany; United States	Documentary	Sandy Stone, Texas Tomboy, Susan Stryker and Hida Viloria	a.k.a. Gendernauts: A Journey Through Shifting Identities
Go	Doug Liman	United States	Comedy, crime	William Fichtner, Katie Holmes, Jay Mohr, Sarah Polley, Scott Wolf and features Taye Diggs, Breckin Meyer, Timothy Olyphant, Desmond Askew, Jane Krakowski, J. E. Freeman, and Melissa McCarthy	
The Green Elephant	Svetlana Baskova	Russia	Horror	Sergey Pakhomov, Vladimir Epifantsev	
Happy, Texas	Mark Illsley	United States	Crime, comedy	Jeremy Northam, Steve Zahn, Ally Walker, Illeana Douglas and William H. Macy	
Hit and Runway	Christopher Livingston	United States	Comedy	Michael Parducci, Peter Jacobson and Judy Prescott	
I Know a Place	Roy Mitchell	Canada	Short documentary	Bob Goderre	
Je vois déjà le titre	Martial Fougeron	France	Short, drama	Denis D'Arcangelo, Orazio Massaro and Michèle Moretti	aka I already see the title
Just One Time	Lane Janger	United States	Comedy	Lane Janger, Joelle Carter, Guillermo Díaz and Jennifer Esposito	
Laugh in the Dark	Justine Pimlott	Canada	Documentary	Gary Colwell, Don Morden, Doris Mehegan	
Lola and Billy the Kid	Kutlug Ataman	Germany; Turkey	Drama	Gandi Mukli, Baki Davrak, Erdal Yıldız, Murat Yılmaz, Inge Keller and Michael Gerber	Known in German as Lola und Bilidikid
Love in the Mirror (Amor nello specchio)	Salvatore Maira	Italy	Drama	Anna Galiena, Peter Stormare and Simona Cavallari	
L'un dans l'autre	Laurent Larivière	France	Short	Gérald Broclawik, François Revaclier and Isabelle Malin	aka In and Out
The Matrix	The Wachowskis	United States	Science-fiction, Action	Keanu Reeves, Laurence Fishburne, Hugo Weaving, Carrie-Anne Moss, and Joe Pantoliano	The film was confirmed by Lilly to be an allegory for transgender themes, with the Matrix being a transformation. One of the characters was intended to be male in the real world and female in the Matrix.
Memento Mori	Kim Tae-yong, Min Kyu-dong	South Korea	Horror, romance, drama	Lee Young-jin, Park Ye-jin, Kim Min-sun and Gong Hyo-jin	
My Gentleman Friends	Moze Mossanen	Canada	Docudrama	Aron Tager, David Gardner, François Klanfer, Christina Collins	
Oi! Warning	Benjamin Reding, Dominik Reding	Germany	Drama	Sascha Backhaus, Sascha Goerts, Sandra Borgmann and Jens Veith	
Piglets	Luc Feit, Marcus Sauermann	Germany	Short, comedy	Andreja Schneider, Christoph Marti and Tobias Bonn	aka Ferkel
The Pinco Triangle	Patrick Crowe, Tristan R. Whiston	Canada	Drama	Michael Fitzgerald, Lorraine Segato	
Rites of Passage	Victor Salva	United States	Drama, thriller	Dean Stockwell, James Remar, Robert Glen Keith and Jason Behr	
Second Skin	Gerardo Vera	Spain	Romance, drama	Javier Bardem, Jordi Molla, Ariadna Gil, Cecilia Roth and Mercedes Sampietro	
See You in Hell, My Darling	Nikos Nikolaidis	Greece	Drama	Vicky Harris, Valeria Christodoulidou, Paschalis Tsarouhas, Nikos Kordinos and Panos Vourlamis	
Set Me Free (Emporte-moi)	Léa Pool	Switzerland; Canada; France	Drama	Karine Vanasse, Pascale Bussières, Miki Manojlovic and Alexandre Mérineau	
The Sex Monster	Mike Binder	United States	Comedy	Mariel Hemingway, Mike Binder, Renee Humphrey (credited as Renée Humphrey)	
Skin Gang	Bruce La Bruce	Canada; Germany; United Kingdom; Japan	Drama, adult	Steve Masters, Eden Miller, Slava Mogutin, Ralph Steel and Daniel Bätscher	a.k.a. Skin Flick
Sleeping Beauties	Jamie Babbit	United States	Short	Sarah Lassez, Radha Mitchell, Clea DuVall, Vince Vieluf and Rose McGowan	
Speedway Junky	Nickolas Perry	United States	Drama	Jesse Bradford, Jordan Brower, Jonathan Taylor Thomas, Daryl Hannah, Tiffani Thiessen and Patsy Kensit	
Taboo	Nagisa Oshima	France; United Kingdom; Japan	Drama	Takeshi Kitano, Ryuhei Matsuda. Shinji Takeda and Tadanobu Asano	a.k.a. Gohatto
The Talented Mr. Ripley	Anthony Minghella	United States	Crime, drama, thriller	Jude Law, Matt Damon, Gwyneth Paltrow, Cate Blanchett, Philip Seymour Hoffman, Jack Davenport	Based on the novel of the same name by Patricia Highsmith
Three to Tango	Damon Santostefano	United States	Comedy, Romance	Matthew Perry, Neve Campbell, Dylan McDermott, Oliver Platt	
Trick	Jim Fall	United States	Comedy, romance, musical	Christian Campbell, John Paul Pitoc, Tori Spelling, Lorri Bagley, Brad Beyer, Steve Hayes and Clinton Leupp	
The Velocity of Gary	Dan Ireland	United States	Drama, comedy	Thomas Jane, Salma Hayek, Vincent D'Onofrio	a.k.a. The Velocity of Gary* *(Not His Real Name)
Where Lies the Homo?	Jean-François Monette	Canada	Documentary		
Why Not Me?	Stéphane Giusti	Spain; France; Switzerland	Comedy	Amira Casar, Julie Gayet, Bruno Putzulu, Alexandra London, Carmen Chaplin, Johnny Hallyday, Marie-France Pisier, Brigitte Roüan, Assumpta Serna and Elli Medeiros	
