= The Shadow-Line =

Short novel by Joseph Conrad

- First edition (UK)
- Author: Joseph Conrad
- Language: English
- Genre: Novel
- Publisher: J. M. Dent
- Publication date: 1917
- Publication place: United Kingdom
- Media type: Print (Hardback)
- Pages: iii, 197 pp

The Shadow-Line, a short novel set at sea, is one of Joseph Conrad's later works, written from February to December 1915. It was serialized in 1916 in New York's Metropolitan Magazine (September–October); in the English Review (September 1916—March 1917); and was published in book form in 1917 in the UK (March) and the United States (April). The novella depicts the development of a young man upon taking a ship's captaincy in the Orient; the title's "shadow line" represents the threshold of the development.

The novella is notable for its dual–narrative structure. Its full title is The Shadow-Line: A Confession, which alerts the reader to the novella's retrospective nature. The ironic constructions following from the conflict between the "young" protagonist (who is never named) and the "old" drive much of the novella's underlying points: the nature of wisdom, experience, and maturity. Conrad also extensively uses irony by comparison, in the work, with characters such as Captain Giles and the ship's steward Ransome, used to emphasise strengths and weaknesses of the protagonist.

The novel has often been cited as a metaphor of the First World War, given its timing and references to a long struggle and the importance of camaraderie. This viewpoint may also be reinforced by the knowledge that Conrad's elder son, Borys, was wounded in the First World War. Others, however, see the novel as having a strong supernatural influence, referring to various plot-lines in the novella such as the "ghost" of the previous captain potentially cursing the ship, and the madness of first mate Mr. Burns. Conrad himself, however, denied this link in his "Author's Note" (1920), claiming that although critics had attempted to show this link, "The world of the living contains enough marvels and mysteries as it is."

Georges Franju made a 1973 French television film, La ligne d'ombre, based on the novel. Andrzej Wajda made a 1976 film adaptation under the Polish title, Smuga cienia.

During a lull in the fighting in Berlin during the last few days of World War II, the author of the memoir, A Woman In Berlin (Marta Hillers), writes that she picks up a copy of The Shadow-Line, to read for the first time in many weeks.

In the 2004 novel (translated in 2005), House of Paper, by Carlos Maria Dominguez, the plot is driven by the narrator's quest for the person who sent a copy of The Shadow-Line to a recently deceased colleague.
