= Baki Davrak =

Turkish-German actor (born 1971)

- Born: 1971 (age 54–55); Bad Säckingen, Baden-Württemberg, Germany.
- Occupation: Actor
- Years active: 1999–present

Baki Davrak (born 1971) is a Turkish-German actor who is known for his leading role in the film The Edge of Heaven (Auf der anderen Seite) which won the Prix du scénario at the 2007 Cannes Film Festival.

== Life ==
Baki Davrak received his training in Hannover and Berlin theatres. Although he has worked on numerous films, he continues to act in the theater.

Baki Davrak first gained attention in Kutluğ Ataman's 1997 film Lola and Billy the Kid and Thomas Arslan's 1999 film Dealer. After these films, Baki Davrak took a break from film productions and became a care taker of a park until Fatih Akin offered him the main role as Professor Nejat, a professor of Turkish descent who teaches German, in his 2007 film The Edge of Heaven. The film won several international prizes including best screenplay, best director, best supporting actor and best supporting actress. In the same year, Baki Davrak also appeared in Harald Bergmann's film, Brinkmanns Zorn (Brinkmann's Wrath).

Baki Davrak has also appeared in numerous television series and movies including Wolffs Revier, Eva Blond, and Meine verrückte türkische Hochzeit (made into the English Kiss me Kismet), though most of the roles were small. From January 2008 until August 2009, he took on the WDR radio scene as he played the role of Nadir Taraki, the main criminal investigator on the first four installments of a radio series.

In addition to acting, Baki Davrak also writes. His first volume of poetry was to be published in 2007, but was delayed.

== Filmography ==
=== TV series ===
Year	Title	Role
2024	Kudüs Fatihi Selahaddin Eyyubi	Avram
2020–2021	Çukur	Ogeday Erdenet
2016–2017	Vatanım Sensin	Vasili
2010	Mordkommission Istanbul	Erhan Akalın
2010	Ein Fall für zwei	Valon Majko
2010	KDD – Kriminaldauerdienst	Türkischer Heiler
2009	Tatort	Kuzen
2006	Kommissarin Lucas	Cengiz Özgür
2004	Alarm für Cobra 11 – Die Autobahnpolizei	Scherge
2004	Eva Blond	?
2004	Wolffs Revier	Klaus Sänger
2000	Codename: Puma	Jens Schlegel
1999	Balko	Roman

=== Web series ===
Year	Title	Role
2020	Rise of Empires: Ottoman	Đurađ Branković

=== Film ===
Year	Title	Role
2014	Kırımlı	Bauer
2011	Praktican vodic kroz Beograd sa pevanjem i plakanjem	Orhan
2011	Bizim Büyük Çaresizliğimiz	Fikret
2010	Do Not Forget Me Istanbul	?
2007	The Edge of Heaven	Nejat Aksu
2006	Brinkmann's Wrath	Konrad
2003	Past by Night	Marc
2003	Scardanelli	Waiblinger
2001	Null Uhr 12	Polis
2001	Planet Alex	Jo
1999	Bevor der Tag anbricht	Asker
1999	Die Braut	August Goethe
1999	Dealer	Zeki
1999	Lola und Bilidikid	Murat
