= Nursel Köse =

Turkish actress

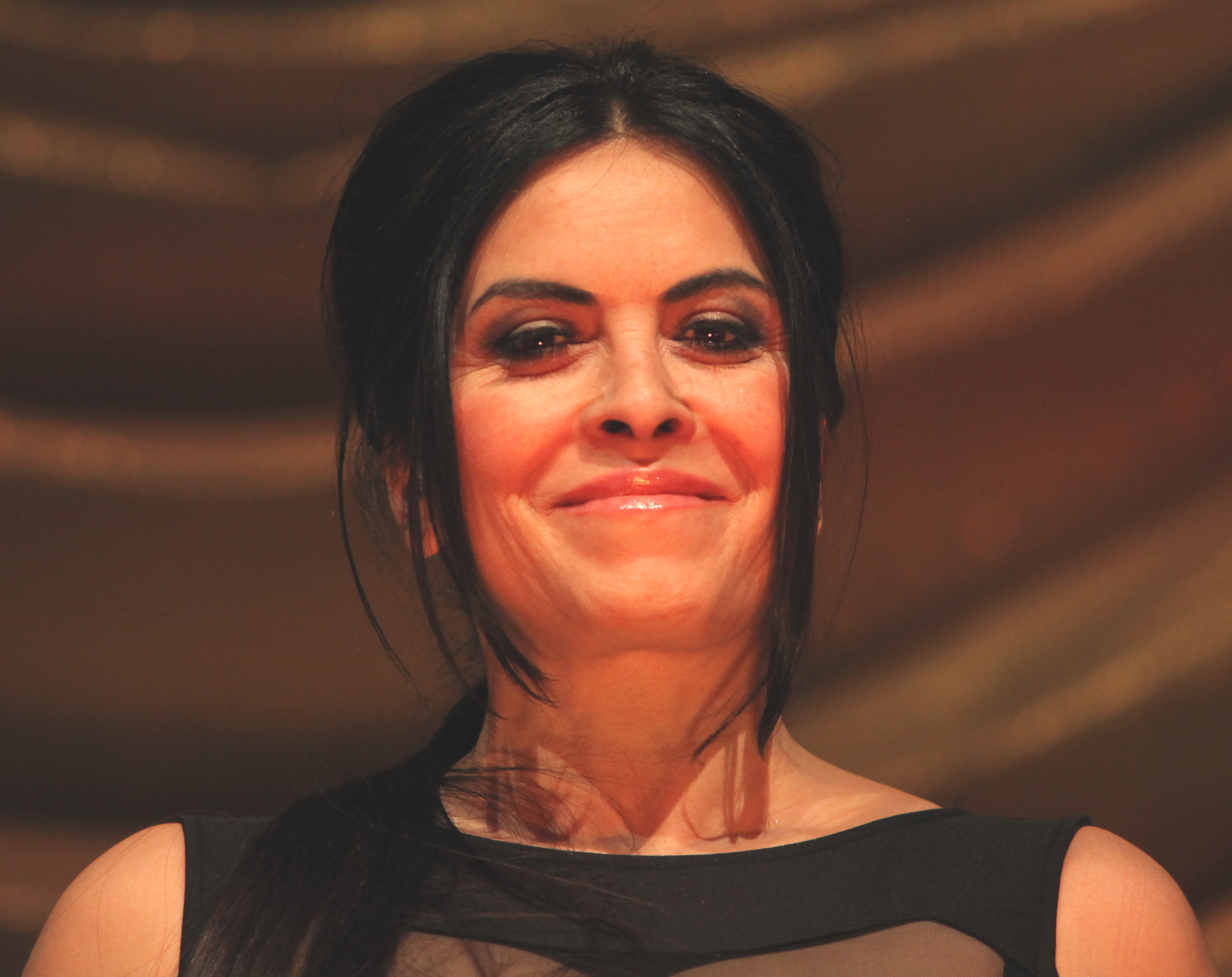
- Köse at the 2014 Berlin Film Festival
- Born: 29 March 1961 (age 65); Malatya, Turkey
- Occupation: Actress
- Years active: 1988–present
- Spouse: Ulrich Mertin (m. 2018)
- Website: nurselkoese.com

Nursel Köse (born 29 March 1961) is a Turkish-German actress. She studied and worked in Germany. Köse starred in the internationally acclaimed film The Edge of Heaven. She played Keriman Akçatepe in the TV series Paramparça.

== Filmography ==
=== Film ===
Year	Title	Role	Notes
1988	Yasemin	Emine	
2001	Anam	Anam	
2003	Une grande fille comme toi		TV film
2003	Savannah	Frau Dubonnet	TV film
2004	Kebab Connection	Hatice	
2005	Offside	Hayats Chefin	
2007	The Edge of Heaven	Yeter Öztürk	
2009	7 Avlu	Zarife	
2010	When We Leave	Gül	
2011	Kardelen	Hatice	
2011	72. Koğuş	Kuru Nedime	
2011	Merhaba	Aunt Mine	Short film
2011	Anduni		
2012	Dedeler En İyisini Bilir	Makbule	Short film
2012	Gassal		Short film
2013	300 Worte Deutsch	Aunt Damla	
2014	Kuzu	Safiye	
2015	Unterm Radar	Amira	TV film
2015	İçimde Akan Nehir	Suna	
2016	Propaganda 2		
2016	Kaçma Birader	Züleyha	
2017	Die Hölle	Hande	
2017	Ein Fisch namens Liebe	Fatma Çiller	TV film
2018	Eski Köye Yeni Adet	Hemşire	
2019	Ölü Yatırım	Nurhayat	
2022	Dilberay	Hafza	
2023	Prestij Meselesi	Fatma	

=== Television ===
Year	Title	Role	Notes
2004	Cologne P.D.	Aische Ceman	
2005	Sessiz Gece	Aylin	
2006	Köprü	Saliha	
2007	Kreuzfahrt ins Glück	Leyla Güneş	
2007	Türkisch für Anfänger	Gülcan Süleyman	
2007	Kavak Yelleri	Nur Seven	
2007	Kartallar Yüksek Uçar	Mebrure	
2007	Die Familienanwältin	Frau Yılmaz	
2008	Kalpsiz Adam	Meliha	
2008	Tatort	Immobilienmaklerin	
2008	Großstadtrevier		
2009	Mordkommission Istanbul	Yelda Akdamar	
2009	Kış Masalı		
2010	Çok Güzel Hareketler Bunlar		
2011	Al Yazmalım	Maryamhan	
2012	Kötü Yol	Bedia	
2012	München 7	Ayşe Armut	
2014–2017	Paramparça	Keriman Akçatepe	Supporting role
2018–2019	Avlu	Kudret Öztürk	Leading role
2019–2020	Güvercin	Kevsa	Leading role
2021	Arıza	İhtiyar/Bergüzar Ece	Supporting role
2021	Menajerimi Ara	Herself	Guest appearance
2021–2022	Üç Kuruş	Neriman Çaka	Leading role
2023	Aldatmak	Mualla Dicleli	Supporting role
2024	Uzak Şehir	Fikriye Gürdel	

== Books ==
- 1996: Der Liebe zum Trotz / Sevdaya İnat – Poem
- 1997: Hafızamda Oturuyorsun – Poem
- 2000: Ütopya – Poem
- 2000: WDR – Poem, Story

Awards
Preceded by Nazan Kesal	Golden Orange Award for Best Supporting Actress; 2007 for Yeter	Succeeded by Övül Avkıran
