= The Edge of Heaven (film) =

2007 drama film

- German promotional poster
- Directed by: Fatih Akın
- Written by: Fatih Akın
- Produced by: Fatih Akin; Klaus Maeck; Andreas Thiel; Jeanette Würl
- Starring: Nurgül Yeşilçay; Baki Davrak; Tuncel Kurtiz; Hanna Schygulla; Patrycia Ziolkowska; Nursel Köse
- Cinematography: Rainer Klausmann
- Edited by: Andrew Bird
- Music by: Shantel
- Production companies: Anka Film; Corazón International; Dorje Film; Norddeutscher Rundfunk
- Distributed by: The Match Factory (worldwide); Strand Releasing (US)
- Release dates: 23 May 2007 (Cannes Film Festival); 27 September 2007 (Germany); 26 October 2007 (Turkey)
- Running time: 123 minutes
- Countries: Germany; Turkey
- Languages: German; Turkish; English
- Box office: $17,804,565

The Edge of Heaven (German: Auf der anderen Seite, literally On the Other Side, Turkish: Yaşamın Kıyısında) is a 2007 Turkish-German drama written and directed by Fatih Akın. The film won the Prix du scénario at the 2007 Cannes Film Festival, was Germany's entry in the category Best Foreign Language Film at the 2007 Oscars, but was not nominated.

After making its worldwide debut at the Cannes Film Festival in France, the film was shown at several international film festivals. It was released in Germany on 27 September 2007.

== Plot ==
Yeter's Death

Retired widower Ali Aksu (Tuncel Kurtiz), a Turkish immigrant living in Bremen, Germany believes he has found a solution to his loneliness when he meets Yeter Öztürk (Nursel Köse). He offers her a monthly payment to stop working as a prostitute and move in with him. After receiving threats from two Turkish Muslims for the work she does, she decides to accept his offer. Ali's son, Nejat Aksu (Baki Davrak), a professor of German literature, does not have time to respond to the prospect of living with a woman of "easy virtue" before Ali is stricken with a heart attack. He softens to her: he learns that she has told her 27-year-old daughter she is a shoe saleswoman, sending shoes to her in Turkey to support that story, and wishes her daughter could receive an education like his.

After returning home from the hospital, Ali suspects Yeter and his son may have had a liaison. When his drunken demands of Yeter cause her to threaten to leave, he strikes her, and she dies from the blow. Ali is sent to prison.

Nejat travels to Istanbul to search for Yeter's daughter, Ayten (Nurgül Yeşilçay), and assumes responsibility for her education. Unable to locate her through her family and not having any recent photos of her, he posts flyers with Yeter's photo throughout the area, in hope that it will lead to the daughter. When he posts a flyer in a small German language bookstore that happens to be for sale, he finds himself charmed into buying it.

Lotte's Death

A plainclothes officer loses his gun on the street during a riot. A hooded figure scoops it up and is pursued on foot by a battalion of uniformed officers, barely managing to hide the contraband on a random rooftop. This is Ayten, member of a Turkish anti-government resistance group.

When her cell is raided, she flees Turkey and takes up a new identity with political allies in Bremen, Germany. However, even there, she has a falling out when she is unable to pay them money she owes, and thus finds herself on the street with barely a euro to her name. Her mother's number is lost, so she lives illegally and searches for her in local shoe shops.

Lotte, a university student, offers to help her with food, clothes, and a place to stay—a gesture which is not particularly welcomed by her mother, Susanne. Ayten and Lotte become lovers and Lotte decides to help Ayten search for her mother. The quest is cut short when a traffic stop exposes Ayten's illegal status and she attempts a claim of political asylum. Despite Susanne's financial support, Germany rules that Ayten has no legitimate fear of political persecution. She is deported and immediately imprisoned.

Lotte is devastated. She travels to Turkey to try to free Ayten, but quickly realizes how little hope there is, as she is facing 15 to 20 years in jail. Susanne pleads with her to think of her future and return home. When Lotte refuses, her mother denies her any further assistance. Lotte gravitates to Nejat's bookstore and ends up renting a spare room from him.

Finally granted a prison visit with Ayten, Lotte complies with her imprisoned lover's request and retrieves the handgun Ayten grabbed in the riot. But Lotte's bag, with the gun inside, is snatched by a crew of boys that she then chases through their neighborhood. When finally she finds them in a vacant lot, one of them is inspecting the gun. She demands he return it, but he points it at her and fires, killing her instantly.

The Edge of Heaven (literally, On the Other Side)

Upon his release, Ali is deported to Turkey, returning to his property in Trabzon on the Black Sea coast.

After her daughter's death, Susanne goes to Istanbul to see where her daughter had been living the past few months. She meets Nejat and reads her daughter's diary; she decides to take on her daughter's mission of freeing Ayten from prison. Susanne's visit to Ayten—an offer of forgiveness and support—leads the younger woman to exercise her right of repentance. As a result, she wins her freedom.

Susanne asks Nejat about the story behind a Bayram festival they hear about, learning that it commemorates Ibrahim's sacrifice of his son Ishmael. She comments that there is the same story in the Bible, where Abraham is asked to sacrifice his son Isaac. Nejat reminisces about being scared by the story as a child and asking his father if he would sacrifice him if God told him to. When asked by Susanne what his father's answer was, Nejat tells her that his father said "He would make God his enemy in order to protect me."

Nejat removes the flyer of Yeter from the shop's noticeboard. He asks Susanne to look after his shop while he is gone, and drives to Trabzon, where his father is living. Susanne offers Ayten a place to stay with her at Nejat's house. When Nejat arrives in Trabzon, his father is out fishing, so he waits for him on the beach.

== Cast ==
- Tuncel Kurtiz as Ali Aksu, a Turkish immigrant to Germany
- Baki Davrak as Nejat Aksu, Ali's son, a Turkish German university professor
- Nursel Köse as Yeter Öztürk, a Turkish immigrant to Germany
- Nurgül Yeşilçay as Ayten Öztürk, Yeter's daughter, a Turkish student and rebel
- Patrycia Ziolkowska as Charlotte "Lotte" Staub, a German student
- Hanna Schygulla as Susanne Staub, Lotte's mother
- İdil Üner as Ärztin
- Erkan Can as Cousin Ufuk
- Turgay Tanülkü as Cem

== Production ==
Filming took place in Bremen and Hamburg, Germany; at Taksim and Kadıköy in Istanbul; and on the Black Sea coast in Trabzon, Turkey.

== Reception ==
The film received positive reviews from Western critics. Review aggregator Rotten Tomatoes reported that 90% of critics gave the movie positive reviews, based on 77 reviews, with an average rating of 7.8/10. The website's critical consensus reads, "Evocative and complex, this story of struggling immigrants in Germany will stay with you after you leave the theater." Metacritic reported the film had an average score of 85 out of 100, based on 26 reviews, indicating "universal acclaim".

=== Top ten lists ===
The film appeared on many US critics' top ten lists of the best films of 2008.

- 2nd - Sean Axmaker, Seattle Post-Intelligencer
- 2nd - Stephen Holden, The New York Times
- 2nd - Steve Rea, The Philadelphia Inquirer
- 2nd - Wesley Morris, The Boston Globe
- 3rd - Dana Stevens, Slate
- 4th - Ann Hornaday, The Washington Post
- 5th - A. O. Scott, The New York Times
- 5th - Michael Sragow, The Baltimore Sun
- 6th - J. R. Jones, Chicago Reader
- 6th - Owen Gleiberman, Entertainment Weekly
- 6th - Rick Groen, The Globe and Mail
- 7th - Ann Hornaday, The Washington Post
- 9th - Anthony Lane, The New Yorker
- 9th - Stephen Farber, The Hollywood Reporter
- 9th - Tasha Robinson, The A.V. Club
- 10th - Kirk Honeycutt, The Hollywood Reporter

== Awards and nominations ==
After winning the Best Screenplay Award at the 2007 Cannes Film Festival, the film won the Lino Brocka Award in the International Cinema category at the 2007 Cinemanila International Film Festival in the Philippines. Five awards followed at Antalya Golden Orange Film Festival (best director, editing, supporting actor, supporting actress and special jury award), and then it won:

- On 24 October 2007, the European Parliament's newly established LUX prize for European cinema;
- On 10 November 2007, the Critics Award at the European Cinema Festival, in Seville;
- On 1 December 2007, the best screenplay award at European Film Awards, with nominations for best director and best film;
- In January 2008, the Grand Prix of the Belgian Syndicate of Cinema Critics;
- the Best Supporting Actress award to Hanna Schygulla from the National Society of Film Critics.

== See also ==
- Cinema of Germany
- Cinema of Turkey

Awards
Preceded by Volver	Cannes Film Festival Prix du scénario 2007	Succeeded by Le silence de Lorna
Preceded by new creation	Lux Prize for European Cinema; 2007	Succeeded by Le silence de Lorna
Preceded by Takva	Golden Orange; Dr. Avni Tolunay Jury Special Award for Best Picture; 2007	Succeeded by incumbent
