= A Woman in Berlin =

1954 memoir by Marta Hillers

- First English Language edition
- Author: Marta Hillers
- Genre: Memoir
- English publication date: 1954

A Woman in Berlin (German: Eine Frau in Berlin) is a memoir by German journalist Marta Hillers (1911–2001), originally released anonymously in 1954. The identity of Hillers as the author was not revealed until 2003, after her death. The memoir covers the period between 20 April and 22 June 1945 in Berlin during the capture and occupation of the city by the Red Army. The work depicts the widespread rape of civilians by Soviet soldiers, including the rape of the author. It also looks at a woman's pragmatic approach to survival, which involved relying on Soviet officers for protection.

The first English edition appeared 1954 in the United States, where it was very successful, and was followed rapidly by translations into Dutch, Italian, Danish, Swedish, Norwegian, Spanish, and Japanese. When finally published in German in 1959, the book was either "ignored or reviled" in Germany. Based upon the reception within her home country, Hillers refused to have another edition of the work published during her lifetime.

In 2003, two years after Hillers' death, a new edition of the book was published in Germany, again anonymously. It met with wide critical acclaim and was on bestseller lists for more than 19 weeks. Jens Bisky, a German literary editor, identified the anonymous author that year as German journalist Marta Hillers, who had died in 2001. This revelation caused a literary controversy, and questions of the book's authenticity were explored. The book was published again in English in 2005 in the United Kingdom and the United States. It has been translated into seven other languages.

The book was adapted as a 2008 German feature film, directed by Max Färberböck and starring Nina Hoss. It was released in the United States as A Woman in Berlin in 2008.

Coincidentally, also in 2008, the English translation of the book by Philip Boehm (Virago, 2005) was dramatised as a one-woman monologue, by the playwright Iain McClure, and staged at the New Works, New Worlds Festival at the Arches Theatre, Glasgow in 2009.

== Overview ==
The memoir describes a journalist's personal experiences during the occupation of Berlin by the Soviets at the end of World War II. She describes being gang raped by Russian soldiers and deciding to seek protection by forming a relationship with a Soviet officer; other women made similar decisions. The author described it as "sleeping for food." Conditions in the city were cruel, as women had no other protection against assaults by soldiers. "...when the Woman and her neighbours go to a Soviet commander to complain about the rapes and to seek his aid in stopping them, he merely laughs."

The book is known for its "unsentimental" tone in describing sexual assault but, as a New York Times critic pointed out, "the rapes are by no means all of [the book]. We are also given the feeling inside a bomb shelter, the breakdown of city life and civil society, the often surreal behavior of the enemy, soldiers' arms lined with looted wristwatches, the forced labor clearing out the rubble piles that marks the beginning of the road back."

== Plot summary ==
The "chronicle" of the unnamed Narrator begins with the end of the war reaching Berlin. There is constant artillery and the Narrator lives in an attic apartment that belongs to a former colleague that let her stay since he is on leave. Her original apartment was bombed and destroyed. While she lives off meager food coupons, all of her thoughts are of food and her gnawing hunger. All of the Berliners spend their time either in the basement air raid shelters, their apartments, standing in lines for food, or raiding food stocks when the rations do not suffice. Spending time in the basement shelter, the Narrator gets to know her fellow "cave dwellers" and a kind of camaraderie forms. When a series of bombing destroys her apartment, a pharmacist's Widow allows the narrator to live at her place.

All of a sudden there is silence when the Red Army reaches their street. The Soviets set camp outside and spend their first days comparing stolen watches and bicycles. Eventually the soldiers enter the buildings and basement air raid shelters asking for alcohol and choosing women to rape. The Narrator works as a sort of translator and mediator for women in the basement who are pursued for rape. She tries to convince the men to not rape women and seeks a commander to plead to stop the rapes but minimal effort is offered to the women. Two men outside of the basement rape the narrator after her fellow Germans close and lock the door behind her. Many families desperately hide their young daughters to preserve their virginity. Four Soviet soldiers barge into the widow's apartment and one soldier, named Petka, rapes the Narrator. After raping the Narrator, Petka begins his "Romeo babble" where he expresses a liking for the Narrator and how he hopes to return later that day. That same day the widow's tenant Herr Pauli arrives and settles in his bed. His male presence offers some but very limited protection against the Soviet sexual predators. Another Russian soldier, described as old, enters the apartment and rapes the narrator in an exceptionally demeaning manner as he opens up her mouth to spit in it and then throws a half opened pack of cigarettes on the bed as payment.

This rape experience creates some sort of turning point for the Narrator, who decides after vomiting and crying that she has to use her brains to help her situation. She decides that she needs to "find a single wolf to keep away the pack" and heads outside to find some higher-ranked Soviet to have an exclusive sexual relationship with so that she does not get viciously and spontaneously raped every day by different men. Out in the street she meets Anatol, a lieutenant from Ukraine. She flirts with him briefly and they agree to meet at her place at 7 pm. That night Petka arrives with some of his friends and makes himself at home. Petka and his friends shock the Widow and the Narrator as they place their food straight on the table, throw bones to the floor, and spit casually. Despite the Narrator's worries that Petka and Anatol might clash over her, when Anatol comes he is at ease in her apartment and she discovers that his rank means very little to the Soviets. Over the next days, Anatol comes to have sex with the narrator and a "taboo" is formed in that the Soviets know that she is claimed. Anatol and his men come and go as they please and the widow's apartment is considered "Anatol's men's restaurant" but a restaurant where they bring the food. The Narrator and the Widow get food that the Soviets bring and they benefit from the protection of Anatol's men against other Soviet soldiers. The Narrator also meets educated Soviet soldiers, such as Andrei, and has many conversations about politics, fascism, and such. Petka shows up completely drunk in a fit of rage against the Narrator and tries to hurt her but due to his drunkenness the Widow and the Narrator manage to push him out of the apartment. Among the many Soviet visitors of the apartment, a pale blond lieutenant who has a lame leg and a clear dislike of the narrator rapes her one night, completely ignoring the "taboo" with Anatol. He arrives another day with a Major and after conversing and drinking champagne; he asks the narrator if the major pleases her. The Narrator realizes she has little choice considering Anatol has left and eventually decides to have sex with the major. She accepts the relationship with the major and does not call it rape since it is consensual. The Major is very pleasant, shares his life with her, and brings her food and supplies such as candles. The Narrator contemplates her status as she agrees to have sexual relationships in return for goods and protection.

Eventually, Berlin completely surrenders and the Soviet soldiers leave the street. The city begins to undergo reconstruction and the German women are rallied to work under orders to clear the rubble and to search for zinc. The Narrator gets pulled off to do laundry and for the last days of work she works tirelessly with other women while being teased by Soviet soldiers. Once the job ends, the Narrator finds out through a friend called Ilse that a Hungarian plans to start a press. The Narrator works with the Hungarian and others to start planning the products. Gerd, the Narrator's boyfriend from before the war, shows up and clashes with her on her change in mindset after the war and her discussion of her rapes. Gerd believes that she has lost her mind and has changed immensely from before. The chronicle ends with the Narrator brooding on her relationship with Gerd.

== Characters ==
The Narrator

The unnamed Narrator is a woman who recounts her life through eight weeks in Berlin at the end of the war. She describes herself as a thirty year old "pale faced blonde always dressed in the same winter coat". The Narrator lives alone at first in an abandoned apartment but then moves in with the Widow when the Soviets arrive. She was a journalist before the war that traveled to numerous countries and speaks different languages, including a bit of Russian and French. Her understanding of the Russian language proved useful during the invasion as she served as one of few lines of communication between those residing in Berlin and the Soviet soldiers as if she was "placed on the front line" herself. During the stay of the Soviets she is subject to numerous horrific rape attacks which leads her to seek a sexual relationship with lieutenant Anatol and then the Major in order get some sort of "protection" from all other Soviet soldiers. These relationships also give her access to food. After the Soviets leave, she works with German women to clear the rubble, clean clothes, and eventually finds a job with a Hungarian starting a press.

Widow

The Widow lives with the Narrator and Herr Pauli throughout the occupation of the Soviets. She is a fifty-year-old woman who lived a more bourgeois proper life before the war. During the occupation she shares house tasks and worries with the Narrator and understands the sexual relationships the Narrator has. The Widow looks up to Herr Pauli and eventually asks the Narrator to move out when Herr Pauli is frustrated with sharing food with the Narrator.

Anatol

Anatol is the Ukrainian lieutenant with whom the narrator first seeks a sexual relationship with in order to avoid constant attacks by random Soviet soldiers. He is kind and very large and strong. He works in a dairy farm in Russia and is overall very uneducated and unrefined.

Herr Pauli

Herr Pauli is the Widow's tenant. From when he arrives from the war he mostly stays in bed and socializes with the Soviets that come in. He enjoys the goods that the Soviets bring but gets increasingly bothered by the Narrator's presence after her relationships with the Russians end and she eats the potatoes that belong to the Widow. He eventually asks the Widow to tell the Narrator to leave, which she does. Herr Pauli expresses his strong optimistic or pessimistic views on the recovery of Germany, which the Widow generally endorses.

Petka

Petka is a Soviet soldier who rapes the Narrator. After raping the Narrator he commences his "Romeo babble" as he expresses how he likes her and insists on coming back often. He makes himself and his friends at home in the Widow's apartment where they eat and drink plenty, and do not exhibit any manners.

The Major

The Major is introduced to the Narrator by the pale blond lieutenant with the lame leg. The Major is very pleasant and courteous to the narrator and the Widow and Herr Pauli. While he wanted a sexual relationship with the Narrator, he made it a point for her to know that if his presence did not please her he would leave immediately. He shares many details of his life with the Narrator and has a consensual sexual relationship with her for the last days before the Soviets leave. He provides the Narrator, the Widow, and Herr Pauli with plenty of supplies.

== Themes ==
Rape

The Narrator explores the significance and impact of rape on her life throughout A Woman in Berlin. Throughout all of her rapes, she clearly describes suffering and numbness and anger. However, she "laugh[s] at the face of lamentation" and says that she is alive and that life goes on when the Widow apologizes for not intervening enough. She contemplates after and realizes that her previous fear of the word "rape" has disappeared. After being raped she comes to the realization that it is not the worst thing in the world despite typical beliefs. Nevertheless, the Narrator reveals a feeling of uncleanliness and repulsion at her own skin after being raped by so many men. The Narrator also broods on her consensual sexual relationships that she has with Anatol and then the Major. She mentions that "By no means could it be said that the major is raping me" and that she is "placing [herself] at his service of [her] own accord". She definitely does not think that she is doing it for love, and she scorns at the way the term rape has become weak and empty. She agrees that to some extent she does it for the "bacon, butter, sugar, candles, canned meat" that the major supplies, and she considers the idea that she is a whore. While she does not have any objections towards prostitution, she acknowledges that she would never be in this situation in peacetime and concludes that this consensual sexual relationship is one that is only morally acceptable for herself in the circumstance of war.

Deutsche Welle noted that the book shows "for many women the end of the war did not bring peace as the physical and mental scars remained fresh was something the author realized when her boyfriend returned from the war. 'For him I've been spoiled once and for all,' she stated soberly, when despite all the joy of reunion, she remained 'ice cold' in bed." The different experiences of women and men created a postwar divide.

Harvard Law professor Janet Halley writes, "Not surprisingly, it is typical to read A Woman in Berlin as a story about rape. However, there is another way to read this text: as a book about the complete destruction of the Woman’s social world and its gradual, halting, and, by the end, only partial replacement by a new one. On this reading, rape is immersed into the fact of national collapse, wartime defeat; rape is an element of her world but not its metonym and certainly not its totality."

== Publication history ==
Hillers showed her manuscript to friends, and author Kurt Marek (C. W. Ceram) arranged for the book's translation into English (by James Stern) and publication in the United States in 1954. He also wrote an introduction, dated August 1954. Hillers married and moved from Germany to Geneva, Switzerland in the 1950s. She first had her book published in German in 1959 by the Swiss firm Helmut Kossodo. Both editions were published anonymously, at her request. This memoir was the only book Hillers published.

== Critical reception ==
Hillers' work was either "ignored or reviled" in Germany in 1959. It was too early to examine German suffering, and some readers were horrified at the pragmatism of German women taking Soviet officers for protection. "Accused of besmirching the honour of German women," Hillers refused to have the book republished in her lifetime.

After Hillers died in 2001, the book was republished in 2003, again anonymously, with an introduction by Hans Magnus Enzensberger, a noted poet and essayist. Enzensberger acknowledges the critics' claim that the author had a "shameless immorality." Due to such reaction, he noted that the author did not wish for the book to be rereleased until after her death. It was noted for "its dry, laconic tone and lack of self-pity. "The writer is too reflective, too candid, too worldly for that," Luke Harding of The Observer wrote." Harding notes that the author wrote: "I laugh right in the middle of all this awfulness. What should I do? After all, I am alive, everything will pass!"

The memoir was a bestseller for more than 19 weeks in Germany. Since the late 20th century, German writers and historians have explored common Germans' suffering during World War II. Gunter Grass published Crabwalk, about thousands of fatalities when a refugee ship was sunk by a Russian submarine, and W. G. Sebald published On the Natural History of Destruction, reflecting on the estimated 600,000 civilian deaths due to Allied bombing of German cities.

A Woman in Berlin was published again in English in 2005, with an introduction by Antony Beevor, a prominent British historian who has published on the Battle of Berlin. He describes it hyperbolically as "the most powerful personal account to come out of World War II."

== Identity of author ==
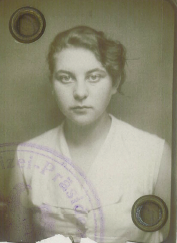
Hillers in the 1930s

In September 2003, Jens Bisky (a German literary editor) identified the anonymous author as journalist Marta Hillers, who had died in 2001. Revelation of Hillers' identity brought controversy in the literary world. Her publisher Enzensberger was angry that her privacy had been invaded. He did not accede to requests by journalists to review the writer's original diary materials. Writing in the Berliner Zeitung, Christian Esch said that if the work were to be fully accepted as authentic, people had to be able to examine the diaries. He said the book's text indicated that changes were made between the initial handwritten diaries and the typed manuscript. It had been translated into English and published for the first time nearly a decade after the events, in 1954 in English and in 1959 in German. He noted there were minor discrepancies between editions.

Prior to republication of the diary in 2003, Enzensberger hired Walter Kempowski, an expert on diaries of the period, to examine Hillers' "original notes and typescript"; Kempowski declared them authentic. After questions from journalists, Enzensberger released Kempowski's report in January 2004. Kempowski had noted that the author's version of events was supported by numerous other sources. He noted that Hillers had added material to the typescript and the published book that were not found in the diary, but editors and critics agree this is a normal part of the revision and editing process.

Antony Beevor, a British historian who wrote a 2002 work on the Battle of Berlin, affirmed his belief in the book's authenticity when it was published in English in 2005. He said it conformed to his detailed knowledge of the period and other primary sources he had used. Beevor wrote the introduction to the new 2005 English edition of the book.

== Adaptations ==
A film adaptation of the book was made in 2008, directed by Max Färberböck and starring Nina Hoss as the anonymous Woman. Its title in Germany was Anonyma - Eine Frau in Berlin. It was released in the US as A Woman in Berlin.

Unconnected to the film, a dramatization of the English translation of the book by Philip Boehm, published by Virago in 2005, was written as a one-woman monologue, by Iain McClure, in 2008 and staged at the New Works, New Worlds Festival at the Arches Theatre, Glasgow, in 2009. To obtain one-off permission for his production, McClure was required to submit successive re-drafts of his play script to the German publisher, Eichborn, right up to the day of first performance, to ensure that no content was included, even imaginary, which might compromise the author's anonymity. The production was directed by Deborah Neville and performed by Molly Taylor. It received a "Highly commended" review from the Scottish Arts Council.

== See also ==
- Battle of Berlin
- Operation Barbarossa
- Joy Division (2006 film)
- The Good German
