= Juliane Köhler =

German actress

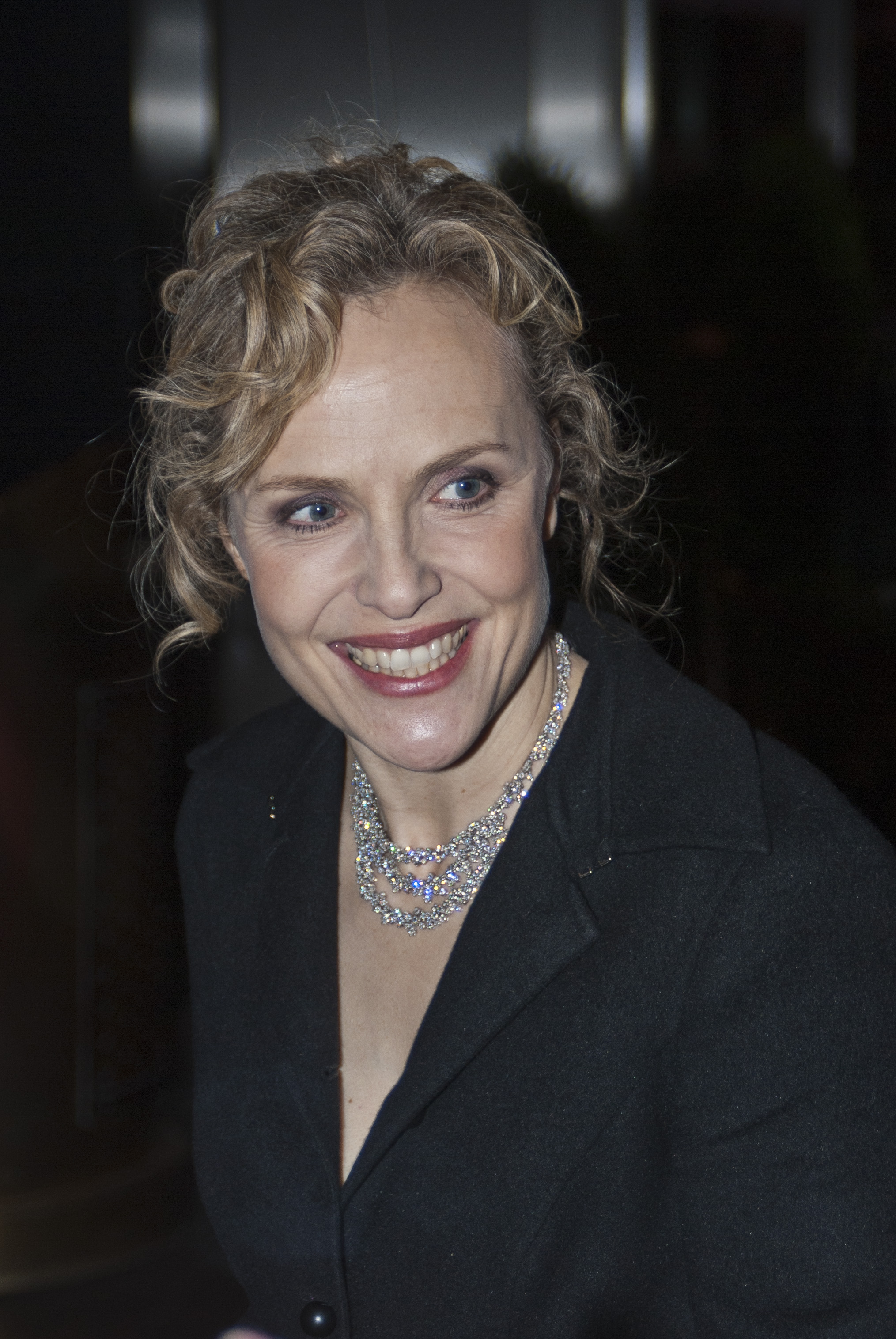
- Juliane Köhler in 2009 Berlin International Film Festival
- Born: 6 August 1965 (age 60); Göttingen, Lower Saxony, West Germany
- Occupation: Actress
- Years active: 1985–present

Juliane Köhler (born 6 August 1965) is a German theatre, television and film actress. She was born in Göttingen to a puppeteer. During the period from 1985 to 1988, she studied under Uta Hagen in New York City and attended HB Studio. She also received ballet instruction in Munich. Since her first appearance at Hanover's Lower Saxon State Theatre in 1988, she has regularly appeared in German theatre productions. She performed in an ensemble cast of the Bavarian State Theatre during 1993–1997. She left the company because her filming of Aimée & Jaguar interfered with rehearsals for a production of Das Käthchen von Heilbronn. She later returned to Munich to participate with the Munich Kammerspiele.

She has starred in the 1999 film Aimée & Jaguar (as Lilly Wust, or Aimée); the 2001 film Nowhere in Africa (as Jettel Redlich); the 2004 film Downfall (as Eva Braun); the 2008 film Haber as Clara, the wife of Fritz Shimon Haber; Christina in Eden Is West (2009) and starred in Two Lives (2012) as Katrine Evensen Myrdal.

== Selected filmography ==
Year	Title	Role	Notes
1998	Aimée & Jaguar	Lilly Wust	
1999	Annaluise & Anton	Bettina Pogge	
2001	Nowhere in Africa	Jettel Redlich	
2004	Downfall	Eva Braun	
2006	Life Actually	Katharina Krüger	
2008	A Woman in Berlin	Elke	
2008	Adam Resurrected		
2008	Haber	Clara Haber	
2009	Eden Is West		
2010	A Quiet Life		
2011	Promising the Moon	Sofia Schleier	
2012	Two Lives	Katrine Evensen Myrdal	
2016	The King's Choice	Diana Müller	
2021	France	Mme Arpel	Post-production

== Awards ==
- 1998 Bavarian Film Award for Best Actress, Aimée & Jaguar.
- 1999 49th Berlin International Film Festival - Silver Bear for Best Actress
- 2014 Two Lives was Germany's official submission to the Best Foreign Language Film category of the 86th Academy Awards in 2014.
