= Two Lives (film) =

2012 film

- Film poster
- Directed by: Georg Maas; Judith Kaufmann
- Written by: Georg Maas
- Starring: Juliane Köhler
- Cinematography: Judith Kaufmann
- Release dates: 19 October 2012 (Norway); 19 September 2013 (Germany)
- Running time: 97 minutes
- Countries: Germany; Norway
- Languages: Norwegian; German

Two Lives (German: Zwei Leben) is a 2012 war drama film written and directed by Georg Maas, and starring Juliane Köhler, with Liv Ullmann. Set in Norway and Germany, it is loosely based on an unpublished novel by Hannelore Hippe since released as Ice Ages. The film explores the history of the Lebensborn or war children, born in Norway and raised in Germany. It explores the life of a grown woman who had claimed to have escaped from East Germany, where she was raised, and her Norwegian mother, with whom she is reunited.

Two Lives won The Grand Prize and the BIFF Award for the Best Film at the Biberach Independent Film Festival, the Audience Award at the International Filmfest Emden, and was nominated for the International Debut Award at the Göteborg International Film Festival. The film was selected in 2013 as the German entry for the Best Foreign Language Film at the 86th Academy Awards, and made the January shortlist.

== Plot ==
It is based on the novel Ice Ages, by German author Hannelore Hippe. She was inspired by reports in the late 1980s of the discovery of the half-burned body of a young woman near Bergen, and there was speculation as to her identity. This was just before the fall of the Berlin Wall and reunification of Germany.

The film gradually unravels the story of Katrine Evensen Myrdal, a happily married woman with a grown daughter and granddaughter, and of her mother Åse Evensen. Katrine is known to have escaped from East Germany and made her way to Norway as a young woman to be reunited with her birth mother, Åse Evensen.

The film explores the cases of Lebensborn or war children, born from unions between German soldiers and Norwegian women, who were taken away after birth to be raised in Germany. Some were adopted by German families; others raised in orphanages. Both societies had shunned the Lebensborn children and their mothers after the war; in Norway, women known to have had relationships with Germans during the Occupation were sometimes incarcerated in work camps. In East Germany, some war children were recruited by the Stasi as agents. Given false identities, they "escaped" to Norway as adults to be reunited with their birth mothers, claiming places of war children and serving as spies. Reportedly there are still such Lebensborn agents in Norway who have not been discovered.

== Cast ==
- Juliane Köhler as Katrine Evensen Myrdal
- Klara Manzel as Young Katrine Evensen
- Sven Nordin as Bjarte Myrdal
- Thorbjørn Harr as Young Bjarte Myrdal
- Liv Ullmann as Åse Evensen
- Ken Duken as Sven Solbach
- Julia Bache-Wiig as Anne Myrdal
- Rainer Bock as Hugo
- Thomas Lawincky as Kahlmann
- Vicky Krieps as Kathrin Lehnhaber
- Dennis Storhøi as Lawyer Hogseth
- Ursula Werner as Hiltrud Schlömer
- Jürgen Rißmann as Detective Lattoch

== See also ==
- List of submissions to the 86th Academy Awards for Best Foreign Language Film
- List of German submissions for the Academy Award for Best Foreign Language Film
