= A Woman in Berlin (film) =

2008 film

- Nina Hoss
- Directed by: Max Färberböck
- Written by: Max Färberböck
- Produced by: Gunter Rohrbach
- Starring: Nina Hoss; Yevgeny Sidikhin
- Music by: Zbigniew Preisner
- Release date: 2008
- Running time: 126 minutes
- Countries: Germany, Poland
- Languages: German, Russian

A Woman in Berlin (German: Anonyma – Eine Frau in Berlin), known as The Downfall of Berlin – Anonyma in the UK, is a 2008 German film directed by Max Färberböck, starring Nina Hoss and Yevgeny Sidikhin. It is based on the memoir, Eine Frau in Berlin, published anonymously (by Marta Hillers) in 1959 in German, with a new edition in 2003. (It was also published in English in 1954 and 2005, and in seven other languages.)

It deals with the treatment of civilians in Soviet-occupied Berlin in the final days of World War II and its immediate aftermath. The film shows a darker side of the Red Army, with its troops repeatedly harassing civilians and raping women, and shows how they integrated themselves into one neighborhood of German civilians.

The film premiered at the 2009 Berlin Film Festival and was praised for its portrayal of a morally complex and brutal period.

== Plot ==
The protagonist is a journalist who has traveled to many European nations. By the onset of World War II, she found herself in Berlin and had to stay there until the Soviets came.

In the first scene, she is shown running to an underground shelter while the Red Army closes in. A battalion of Soviet soldiers orders them by loudspeaker to give up all weapons, and is ambushed by some German soldiers. The battalion's general defies an order to go further.

The soldiers come across the underground shelter and do not immediately hurt anyone. The protagonist asks them what they want in Russian and they invite her (and some other young women) outside promising food. She spends a few minutes outside, then the Soviets start sadistically chasing and forcibly dragging out some of the women. She too is kissed by one of the soldiers but escapes outside.

She goes to the commanding officer to complain but is rebuffed. Later she is raped by a Soviet soldier. The Red Army battalion stays in the neighborhood over a few days (under the guise of strengthening their flanks) and continuously torments the residents with music, loud speeches and arbitrary house searches at all hours of the day. She and other women, including her friend Ilsa, are repeatedly harassed and/or raped by numerous soldiers, and some women in the neighborhood commit suicide out of desperation.

Again she is rebuffed by another commanding officer. After initially rejecting her, the married officer, Andrei Rybkin is gradually seduced by her. She starts writing her account which she has been narrating throughout the film. She has a cool, practical approach to her life and has been part of an informal community that developed among survivors in her apartment building. A young man living at the apartment complex promises to steal food from the Soviets for her.

The Soviets suddenly show up with a huge feast at the apartment complex, which is interrupted by another raid looking for the young man. They torture some of the residents because no one speaks up. Many surviving German men are sent to exile in Siberia. Other women in the flats also take particular officers or soldiers for protection against being raped by soldiers at large. With her connections to the officers she gets access to high quality foods and beverages. She hosts parties with some of her pre-war friends where they revel at the food. A Russian soldier tells her about how German soldiers brutally murdered all the children in his hometown.

May 8th comes around and the German Instrument of Surrender is spoken by a German officer in their neighborhood. The Soviets loudly rejoice and cheer, singing the Soviet national anthem. Ilsa's husband Frederich wants to leave for Siberia, his homeland, but is emotionally begged by Ilsa not to. The soldiers host another fish dinner and the women seem pleased that Hitler is dead. The young man is thrown down the staircase by a Soviet soldier who he shot after he tried to rape his girlfriend. The building is again searched and they find the grenade he was hiding (in violation of the orders), the girlfriend is executed.

The Soviets order everyone in the building to come down and they host another party, getting drunk and dancing with the women, against the wishes of the landlady. The older men ponder what will come of their country. The protagonist and Andrei discuss their marriage aspirations. Frederich poisons himself. Andrei is arrested, and they share a painful last goodbye before he is to be deported to Siberia.

== Cast ==
- Nina Hoss as The Anonymous Woman
- Yevgeny Sidikhin as Andrej Rybkin
- Irm Hermann as Witwe
- Rüdiger Vogler as Eckhart
- Ulrike Krumbiegel as Ilse Hoch
- Rolf Kanies as Friedrich Hoch
- Jördis Triebel as Bärbel Malthaus
- Roman Gribkov as Anatol
- Juliane Köhler as Elke
- Samvel Muzhikyan as Andropov
- August Diehl as Gerd
- Aleksandra Kulikova as Masha
- Viktor Zhalsanov as the Asian Red Armyman
- Oleg Chernov as first rapist
- Eva Löbau as Mrs. Wendt
- Anne Kanis as runaway girl
- Sebastian Urzendowsky as young soldier

== Reception ==
The film received strong reviews for its brutal truthfulness.

=== German critics ===
The Lexikon des internationalen Films was divided in its assessment, writing: "The ambitious adaptation of this unique historical document captures the laconic style of the source material and—particularly regarding the depiction of sexual violence—relies on suggestion rather than explicit detail. However, the film quickly succumbs to the constraints of genre conventions, melodramatically playing out the protagonist’s attempt (in a superbly acted performance) to secure a high-ranking officer as protection against the mob, resulting in all-too-familiar clichés and imagery."

Andrian Kreye reviewed the film for the Süddeutsche Zeitung and was clearly impressed: "Above all, Färberböck and his producer Günter Rohrbach achieved a masterstroke by staging a taboo subject of German history in a way that makes palpable the contemporary fears of plummeting from a cosmopolitan, prosperous life into an archaic state where might makes right."

Rüdiger Suchsland’s assessment of the film for Telepolis argued it came across as exaggerated and bordering on polemical. He elaborated: “Films like this exist not because the creators were interested in the subject matter, but because someone wants to make money and looks for themes that ‘sell’—because a producer wants to jump on a bandwagon that is already rolling along safely and at high speed, and has the funds to purchase the rights. […] The result is a mainstream prestige project—a polished, high-gloss German drama about tragic fate of the kind we know all too well (one is tempted to say ‘ad nauseam’); featuring impeccable German actresses—even in supporting roles—with smudges of dirt on their faces and visibly scratchy fabric against their pale skin, as if they were performing a Hauptmann play, all set amidst neatly arranged rubble.”

Writing for epd Film, Claudia Lenssen wrote that director Färberböck sought to navigate the tricky issue of addressing “sexual violence by Red Army soldiers”—without relativizing Wehrmacht atrocities or downplaying the role of women in Nazi Germany—by attributing to the film’s protagonist feelings for a Russian major. The heroine is portrayed as “one of those guarded Nina Hoss characters who knows how to weather the drama like an indestructible sculpture.” “Benedict Neuenfels’ decorative lighting and Zbigniew Preisner’s sentimental, illustrative score,” she noted, “add a layer of artificial, decorative gloss to the whole affair, despite some fascinating individual scenes."

=== American critics ===
On the review aggregator website Rotten Tomatoes, 82% of 33 critics' reviews are positive, with an average rating of 7/10. The website's consensus reads: "With a powerful lead performance by star Nina Hoss, A Woman in Berlin sheds a light on the moral complications of war." Metacritic, which uses a weighted average, assigned the film a score of 74 out of 100, based on 16 critics, indicating "generally favorable" reviews.

The Washington Post described it as "A clear-eyed portrait of a highly charged chapter in Germany's history, a history that once again proves rewarding fodder for an alert artistic imagination." The reviewer wrote that after the film portrays the initial rapes and assaults against German women by Soviet soldiers, it takes a "much more somber and morally complex turn." The protagonist and her mostly women neighbors must "navigate a city that's become a physical and psychic no-man's land."

Roger Ebert wrote that "Yes, she profits from their liaison, and yes, he eventually takes up her offer. But for each there is the illusion that this is something they choose to do....The woman and man [Andrei] make the best accommodation they can with the reality that confronts them."

The Austin Chronicle praised Hoss "in a supremely complex and modulated performance." It described the film as "that rarest of wartime dramas: an intimate, sorrowful glimpse into the heart and loins of the hellish aftermath of war."

The film won Best International Film at the 24th Annual Santa Barbara International Film Festival.

=== Analysis ===
In her analysis of the film’s reception in Germany and Russia, Yuliya von Saal—a historian at the Institute of Contemporary History in Munich—summarized that the film attempts a joint German-Russian approach to the subject of sexual violence and seeks "to give a face to the rape victims through Nina Hoss, without demonizing the Red Army." Russian critics were described as perceiving the film as serving to relativize German crimes and inverting the roles of perpetrator and victim; a film that left out the approximately 27 million Soviet war dead resulting from the German war of annihilation known as Operation Barbarossa, while "portraying the Red Army as a force of drunken mass rapists and relativizing German crimes." In Germany, conversely, the film was largely viewed as a tedious, politically correct "mainstream prestige project" in which the sexual violence inflicted upon German women by Soviet soldiers was downplayed through a "melodramatic—bordering on kitschy—" romantic storyline. Because the film treated the historical context somewhat carelessly, it could not avoid the risk of "creating an antithesis to one's own culpability" and, like no other, reflects the "difficulties and fears involved in dealing with this highly complex, extremely sensitive, and politically fraught subject."

== See also ==
- Lists of German films
