= Erica Fischer =

Austrian writer (born 1943)

Erica Fischer (born 1 January 1943 in St. Albans) is an Austrian writer, translator, and women's rights activist. She is best known for her book Aimée & Jaguar. Eine Liebesgeschichte, Berlin 1943 (1994), about Lilly Wust and Felice Schragenheim, which was adapted into the 1999 film Aimée & Jaguar. The book won Fischer a Lambda Literary Award in 1996. In 2009, Fischer was the recipient of the Hedwig Dohm certificate from the Association of Women Journalists.
