= Inge Keller =

German actress (1923–2017)

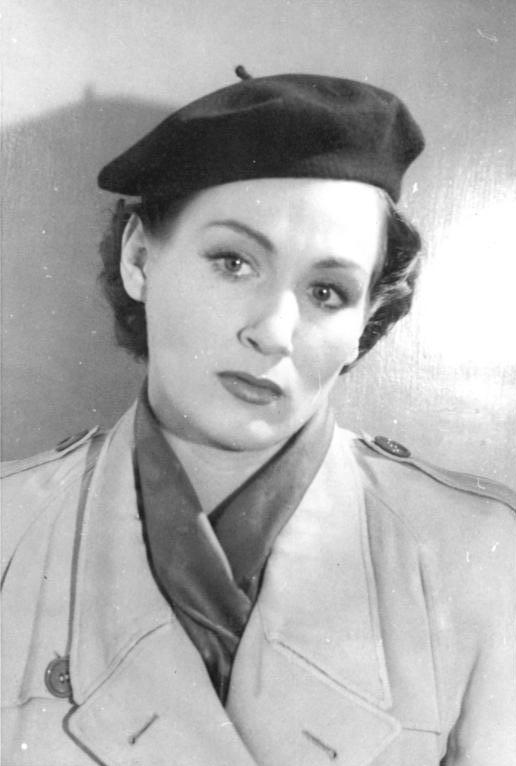
- Keller in a publicity photo for The Last Year (1951)
- Born: 15 December 1923; Friedenau, Berlin, Germany
- Died: 6 February 2017 (aged 93); Berlin, Germany
- Occupation: Actress
- Years active: 1942–2017
- Spouse: Karl-Eduard von Schnitzler (m. 1952; div. 1956)
- Children: Barbara
- Awards: Golden Orange Award for Best Supporting Actress (1999)

Inge Keller (15 December 1923 – 6 February 2017) was a German stage and film actress whose career on stage and screen spanned seventy years. She was one of the most prominent performers in the former German Democratic Republic. Thomas Langhoff described her as "perhaps the most famous actress of the German Democratic Republic—a star." Deutschlandradio Kultur reporter Dieter Kranz called her "a theater legend".

Internationally, Keller was known for her portrayal of the older Lilly Wust in the Golden Globe nominated Aimée & Jaguar. She won the Award for the Best Supporting Actress in the 36th International Antalya Golden Orange Film Festival for her participation in the film Lola and Billy the Kid.

In 2006, Keller received the Order of Merit of Berlin from Mayor Klaus Wowereit.

== Early life ==
Keller was born to an affluent family in Berlin in 1923. Her father owned a quarry, and her mother was an industrialist's daughter. She had an older sister and a younger brother. Keller began studying acting on a whim, after a friend recommended it, and her family did not object.

== Career ==
=== Debut ===
She made her debut on stage at the Kurfürstendamm Theater on 18 November 1942. In 1943, she became a member of the cast in the Freiberg State Theater, and then moved to the Theater Chemnitz in 1944. Alongside all other theaters in Nazi Germany, the latter was closed down on 1 September 1944, when Joseph Goebbels decided to "extend the Total War into the cultural sphere." Keller lost her exempt status as an actress (as did all artists who were not in the God's Gifted List) and was called up for the Reich Labour Service. She entered a sham marriage to avoid conscription, and divorced soon afterwards. Keller told interviewer Günter Gaus that she was "simply too lazy" to join.

=== Breakthrough ===
After the war, Keller returned to act in Freiberg, then in the Soviet Occupation Zone, where she remained until 1947. In 1948, she moved to the Hebbel Theater in Kreuzberg, West Berlin. Soon after, director Boleslaw Barlog was impressed by her and accepted her into the Schlosspark Theater in Steglitz, where she received her first major role, that of Waltraut 'Pützchen' von Mohrungen, in The Devil's General. She depicted the character in 250 performances of the play. In all these institutions she also frequently portrayed the character of Inge Ruoff in Friedrich Wolf's Professor Mamlock. At that time, she met and became romantically involved with Karl-Eduard von Schnitzler, whom she followed to East Berlin in 1950. There, she joined the Deutsches Theater, on the stage of which she made her first appearance on 23 December 1950. She remained a member of the ensemble for fifty years.

=== Height of career ===
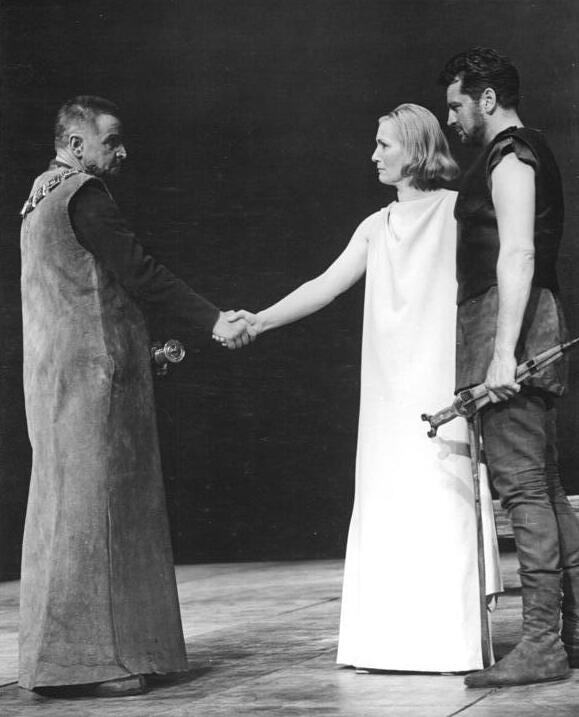
Keller as Iphigenia in a rehearsal on 2 October 1963, two days before the premiere

She and von Schnitzler married in 1952, but divorced in 1956; they had one daughter, Barbara, who also became an actress. In the same year, Keller also became a member of the National Front's National Council.

During her long career in the Deutsches Theater, she depicted a large variety of roles. In 1952, she first portrayed Eliza Doolittle in George Bernard Shaw's Pygmalion, directed by Rudolf Noelte. Keller appeared as Doolittle in 472 performances through the years. In 1953, she depicted Emilia in Wolfgang Heinz's production of Othello, with Ernst Busch as Iago. Some other important roles she had in the 1950s included Goneril in Wolfgang Langhoff's 1957 staging of King Lear and Masha in his 1958 production of Three Sisters. In addition to theater, she also appeared in cinema and television, with a first notable role in Kurt Maetzig's 1950 film The Council of the Gods.

On 30 March 1960, Keller received the Art Prize of the German Democratic Republic. On 6 October 1961, she received the National Prize of East Germany, 1st class, for her participation in the television miniseries Conscience in Turmoil: she played the wife of an army officer (Erwin Geschonneck) who chose to surrender Greifswald to the Red Army without a shot, saving the city from ruin. The series was based on the life of Colonel Rudolf Petershagen.

On 4 October 1963, she first performed what was described as "the role of her life", that of the title character in Iphigenia in Tauris, Langhoff's last production before his death. Langhoff's son and theater director in his own right Thomas described her depiction of the Greek princess as "incomparable to anything". Der Tagesspiegel columnist Christoph Funke commented: "Keller turned that role into an unprecedented epitome in the portrayal of strong, self-aware women."

In 1977, she received the National Prize once again. On 24 April 1981, she first appeared in one of her most remembered roles from the 1980s, as Julie in Danton's Death. On 18 November 1983, she performed Mrs. Alving in the East Berlin premiere of Ghosts, another of her stock characters from that decade, with Ulrich Mühe as Oswald.

=== Later career ===
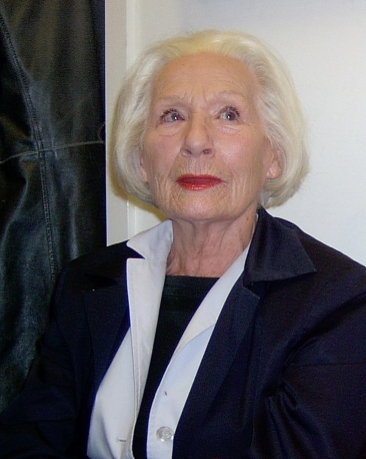
Inge Keller, October 2006

In 1999, Keller portrayed the older Lilly Wust in the Golden Globe nominated Aimée & Jaguar. She won the Award for the Best Supporting Actress in the 36th International Antalya Golden Orange Film Festival for her participation in the film Lola and Billy the Kid. In 2000, she received the Caroline Neuber Prize of the City of Leipzig for her "outstanding performance in theater, cinema and television". On 23 July 2000, she performed on the stage of the Deutsches Theater for the last time, delivering the monologue of Elisabeth Matrei in Ingeborg Bachmann's Three Ways to the Lake. She then became an honorary member of the theater, though she continued to act as a guest.

In late 2012, she depicted Tilla Durieux in the play Tilla, by Christoph Hein which ran at the Deutsches Theater, directed by Gabrielle Heinz, daughter of Wolfgang Heinz.

== Honors ==
On 1 October 2006, Keller received the Order of Merit of Berlin from Mayor Klaus Wowereit.

== Death ==
Keller died in her sleep at a Berlin nursing home on 6 February 2017, aged 93.

== Filmography ==
- 1949:Quartet of Five
- 1950: Der Rat der Götter
- 1951: The Last Year
- 1951: Zugverkehr unregelmäßig
- 1960: Das Leben beginnt
- 1961: Gewissen in Aufruhr (TV miniseries)
- 1963: Jetzt und in der Stunde meines Todes
- 1964: Wolf unter Wölfen (TV)
- 1965: Karla
- 1967: Frau Venus und ihr Teufel
- 1969: Nebelnacht
- 1970: Unterwegs zu Lenin
- 1973: Die Brüder Lautensack (TV)
- 1980: Die Verlobte
- 1984: Ärztinnen
- 1986: Weihnachtsgeschichten (TV)
- 1990: Marie Grubbe
- 1999: Aimée und Jaguar
- 1999: Lola and Billy the Kid
- 2012: Das Kindermädchen
