= Haber (film) =

- Directed by: Daniel Ragussis
- Written by: Daniel Ragussis
- Produced by: Daniel Ragussis; Shannon Factor; Chris Spanos; Brian Hwang
- Starring: Christian Berkel; Juliane Köhler; Mark Margolis; Wolf Kahler
- Cinematography: Carlos Veron
- Edited by: Sara Corrigan
- Music by: Simon Taufique
- Release date: August 5, 2008 (Rhode Island International Film Festival)
- Running time: 0h 34m
- Country: United States
- Language: English

Haber is a 2008 American short-film written and directed by Daniel Ragussis. The film recounts the work of Fritz Haber in developing chemical weapons for the German Army during World War I.

== Plot ==
Fritz Shimon Haber was a German Jewish scientist and professor with a dual legacy, whose life illustrates the moral complexity facing scientists. Born and raised Jewish, his longing to be accepted as a true German and his intense ambition in his career led him to convert to Lutheranism.

In 1918, he won a Nobel Prize, for developing an industrial scale process for the fixation of nitrogen from the atmosphere into ammonia, used to both create synthetic fertilizers used in agriculture, and explosives used in wars. Synthetic fertilizers themselves, while first seen as purely a positive development by increasing short term food productivity, have brought their own problems such as corporate agribusiness and soil depletion.

The film turns on Haber's drafting by the German government to develop the chlorine gas used at Ypres and elsewhere, an early form of chemical warfare, which was even then banned by the Hague Conventions.

Haber's wife Clara Immerwahr was a promising chemist herself, who, in keeping with gender relations back in her time, had sacrificed her own career to support his, as well as raise a family. She felt oppressed by his domineering personality in their relationship, disapproved of Haber's use of science to engineer a horrible death for soldiers, and committed suicide. The day after she took her life, Haber left to supervise the introduction of chemical warfare to the Eastern Front.

== Cast ==
- Christian Berkel as Fritz Shimon Haber
- Juliane Köhler as Clara Haber
- Mark Margolis as Bremer
- Wolf Kahler as Ludendorff

== Production ==
The film was first conceptualised by Ragussis whilst watching a documentary about Fritz Haber. He spent the first year on research, collecting information on the life of Fritz Haber and his wife, Clara, as well as subjects relating to him - such as World War I, German culture and society, and Jewish life in Germany.

Ragussis spent the second year on promotional efforts and fundraising. He developed film materials and applied for grants, which were accepted, and sought donations for the remainder of the budget.

Pre-production took place the following year leading up to the shoot; including hiring crew, finding locations, extensive additional period research, and casting, culminating with the casting of German actors Christian Berkel and Juliane Kohler as Haber and his wife Clara. The shooting of the film took place in just three weeks in June 2005, and was mostly shot in and around New York City, although the climactic gas attack sequence was shot with the help of the Great War Association in Newville, PA. After that, post-production began, and lasted for an additional two years. The film was released in festivals in 2008, screening at the Telluride Film Festival and winning the Best of the Fest Award at LA Shorts Fest. It continued to screen at several more festivals worldwide into 2009.

== Awards ==
- Los Angeles International Short Film Festival - Best Of Festival Award - Winner
- Rhode Island International Film Festival - Grand Prize - Winner
- Columbia University Film Festival – Best Cinematography - Winner
- The Alfred P. Sloan Foundation - Screenwriting Award - Winner
- The Jerome Foundation - New York City Media Arts Grant - Winner
- National Board of Review - Motion Pictures Award - Winner
