= Lola and Billy the Kid =

- German DVD cover
- Directed by: Kutluğ Ataman
- Written by: Kutluğ Ataman
- Produced by: Martin Hagemann
- Starring: Gandi Mukli; Baki Davrak; Erdal Yıldız; Murat Yılmaz; Inge Keller; Michael Gerber
- Cinematography: Chris Squires
- Edited by: Ewa J. Lind
- Music by: Arpad Bondy
- Production companies: Boje Buck Produktion; Westdeutscher Rundfunk; Zero Film GmbH
- Distributed by: Picture This Entertainment; Good Machine International; Turkish Film Channel
- Release dates: 11 March 1999 (Germany); 2 June 1999 (United States)
- Running time: 93 minutes
- Country: Germany
- Languages: German; Turkish

Lola and Billy the Kid (German: Lola und Bilidikid) is a 1999 film scripted and directed by Kutluğ Ataman and produced in Germany. It has a Rotten Tomatoes rating of 40%.

== Plot ==
Seventeen-year-old Murat, from Turkey but living in Berlin, Germany with his mother and older brother Osman, seems to be struggling with his sexuality while Osman, head of the household since the father's death and a taxi driver, strongly urges Murat to lose his virginity to a woman. However, suspecting that Murat is gay and believing that his Turkish background makes him lesser of a person, some boys from Murat's school harass and beat him.

Meanwhile, Lola, a Turkish male who dresses as a female, argues with his boyfriend, a “macho” Turkish male named Bilidikid (Billy), about returning to Turkey. Billy wants Lola to get a sex reassignment (from male to female) and move with him, but Lola refuses, knowing that if he had the surgery, Billy would leave him.

After discovering that Lola is his brother who was disowned by Osman and their father for being gay, Murat runs away from home and meets Lola in the bar in which he works. The two begin to develop a relationship, but Lola mysteriously disappears, leaving Murat at the mercy of Billy, who uses Murat in his business of earning money for receiving oral intercourse.

Soon thereafter, Lola is discovered dead in a river. Billy convinces Murat that he knows who killed Lola, but thinks that they need to take the matter into their own hands rather than letting the police deal with the matter. Two friends of Lola, who also work at the bar, reveal to Murat that when Osman discovered that Lola was gay, Osman raped her. When Lola stood up to him, Osman threw her out of the house. The friends warn Murat that Billy is the same type of person that Osman is.

Murat dresses as Lola, using Lola's red wig to feign his identity. Murat, with Billy lingering in the background, confronts the boys that Billy says are guilty of murdering Lola. After chasing these three boys, Billy castrates one boy and stabs a second one, just as the second boy shoots him, killing them both. Murat is left with the third boy, who says they had no knowledge of Lola's murder.

Upon his return home, Murat discovers that Osman was, in fact, the one who murdered Lola. Hearing Murat's accusation and Osman's admittance of guilt, the boys’ mother slaps Osman and, accompanied by Murat, leaves their home, discarding her hijab.

== Subplot ==
Iskender, a friend of Lola and Billy who is also Turkish, meets a rich German man, Friedrich, for oral intercourse in a park. The two continue to see each other fairly regularly, but Friedrich is far more interested in a relationship than Iskender. However, after the death of Lola, Iskender admits to Friedrich that he would like to have a committed relationship with Friedrich. Friedrich's mother is not pleased with the relationship, as she is protective of her son, and tempts Iskender with more wealth than he has ever known if he will only leave Friedrich. Iskender wants nothing of her money or wealth; he only wants Friedrich. Hearing the love that Iskender has for her son, Friedrich's mother decides that Iskender passed her test and, therefore, approves of their relationship.

== Cast ==
- Gandi Mukli as Lola
- Baki Davrak as Murat
- Erdal Yıldız as Bilidikid
- Hasan Ali Mete as Osman
- Murat Yilmaz as Iskender
- Michael Gerber as Friedrich Schmidt
- Inge Keller as Ute Schmidt

== Critical response ==
The film was nominated for six awards at five different Film Festivals in 1999 and 2000, winning a total of five awards:

- Antalya Golden Orange Film Festival, 1999

Golden Orange for Best Supporting Actress (Inge Keller); tied with Serra Yilmaz for Harem Suarѐ

- Istanbul International Film Festival, 1999

People’s Choice Award for International Competition (Kulug Ataman)

- Torino International Gay and Lesbian Film Festival, 1999

Best Feature Film (Kutlug Ataman)

- Ankara international Film Festival, 2000

Best Cinematography (Christopher Squires)
Best Director (Kutlug Ataman)

The film was also nominated at the Stockholm Film Festival of 1999 for a Bronze Horse, losing to Benoît Mariage’s Les Convoyeurs Attendent. Lola and Billy the Kid was also one of five films which won the Jury Award at the 1999 Berlin Festival in recognition of the exceptional quality and diversity of gay and lesbian German films in that year's Berlinale.

On Rotten Tomatoes the film has a 40% based on reviews from 5 critics.

== Production ==
Ataman originally wanted to shoot the movie in Istanbul. However, he had difficulties finding supporters for his project there. Consequently, Lola and Billy the Kid was filmed entirely in Berlin.

Written and directed by Kutlug Ataman and produced by Martin Hagemann, this film was released by Picture This Entertainment in both Turkish and German and included English subtitles. The approximate running time of this film is 93 minutes and is not rated. Since its original release in Germany in 1999, the film has been rereleased in approximately ten other countries including the United States, Turkey, France and Italy.
