= Stacey Hollywood =

American actress, model and LGBTQ nightclub personality

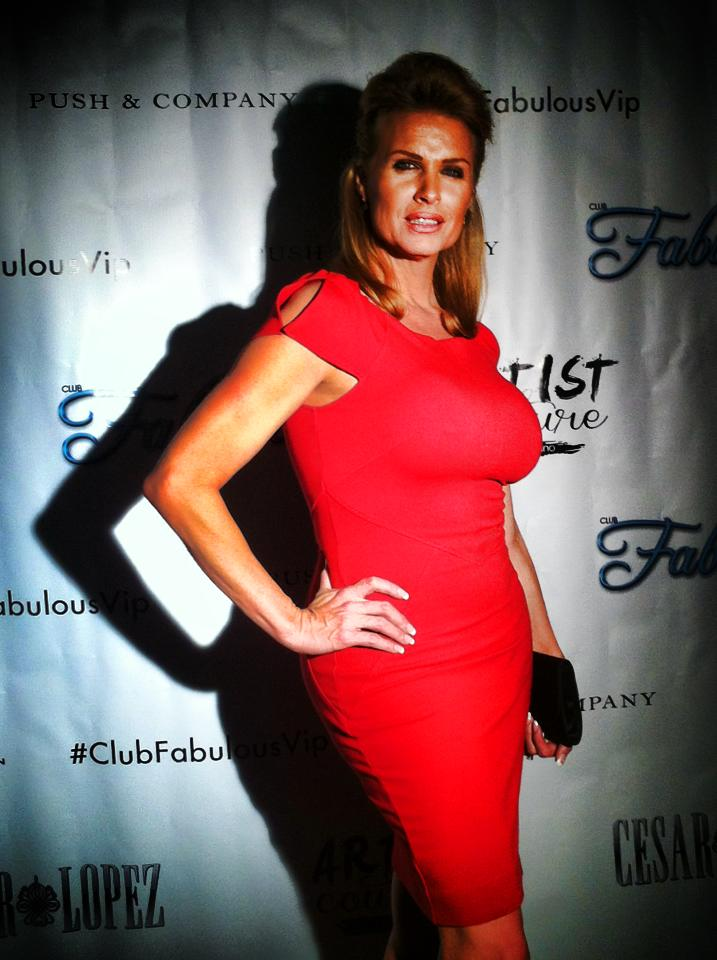
- Stacey Hollywood at Lesbian Gay Bi Transgender party in 2013
- Born: July 3, 1968 (age 58); North Carolina, United States
- Occupations: club promoter, nightclub personality, performance artist, actress, model, singer
- Years active: 18

Stacey Hollywood is an American transgender woman, actress, model, and well-known LGBT nightclub personality. In West Hollywood during the 1990s she became a prominent club promoter, hosting full-to-capacity nights at Club Arena, one of the largest nightclubs in Los Angeles. She was featured on a popular 1998 house music club dance track with Club Arena's resident DJ Irene that was originally released on vinyl and later on a CD compilation.

Stacey Hollywood is the subject of Parris Patton's 1999 documentary Creature, an in-depth look at the young life and transformation of this transgender woman who grew up in rural North Carolina and moved to Hollywood. The film follows her over four years and includes interviews with her conservative Christian parents. It was nominated for a GLAAD Media Award for Outstanding Documentary and received a nomination for Best Documentary at the Chicago International Film Festival.

== Discography ==
- "Weatha Beatin Hoochie Bitch" (1998)
- "Weatha Beatin Hoochie Bitch 2005" (2005)

== Films ==
- Creature (1999) as herself
