= Felice Schragenheim =

Jewish resistance fighter during World War II

- Born: Felice Rahel Schragenheim; 9 March 1922; Berlin, Germany
- Died: between 31 December 1944 and March 1945 (aged 22–23); Bergen, Germany
- Other names: Felice Schröder (alias); Jaguar (alias)
- Partner: Lilly Wust

Felice Rahel Schragenheim (9 March 1922 – between 31 December 1944 and March 1945) was a Jewish resistance fighter during World War II. She is known for her tragic love story with Lilly Wust. She was murdered either on a death march from Gross-Rosen concentration camp to Bergen-Belsen concentration camp or not later than March 1945 in Bergen-Belsen.

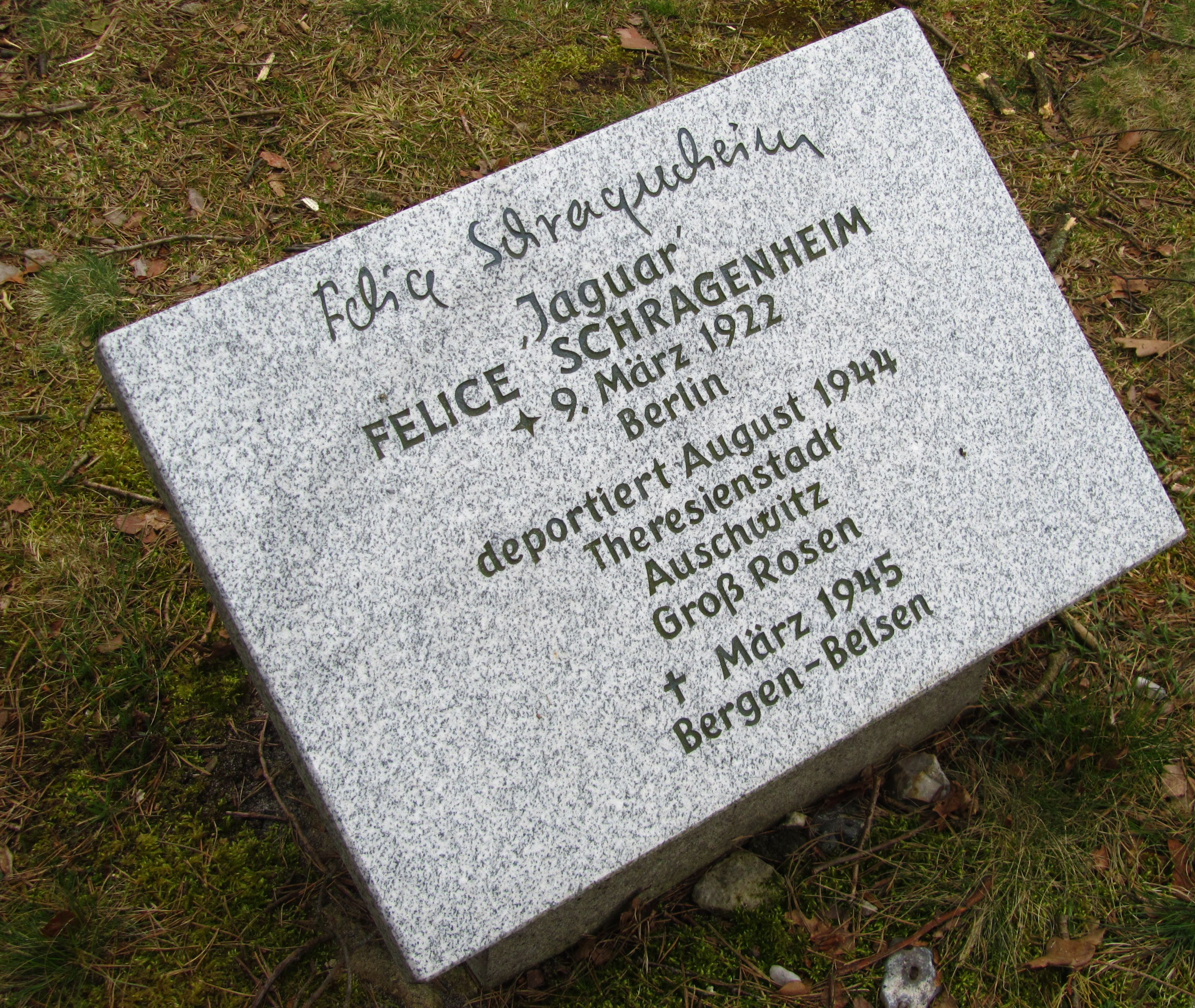
Memorial stone at concentration camp Bergen-Belsen historical site

The story of the relationship between Schragenheim and Wust is portrayed in the 1999 film Aimée & Jaguar, and in a book of the same name by Erica Fischer. It is also the subject of the 1997 documentary Love Story: Berlin 1942.

Schragenheim was deported from Berlin to KZ Theresienstadt (now Czech Republic) on 8 September 1944 by the Nazi Gestapo secret police (transport nr. I/116). On 9 October 1944, she was deported from Theresienstadt to the extermination facility KZ Auschwitz Birkenau to be murdered (transport nr. Ep). As the gas chambers and crematoria were dismantled and blown up between November 1944 and January 1945, the mass extermination in Auschwitz came to an end, gradually. The inmates, including Schragenheim, were taken on a death march to KZ Groß-Rosen, maybe later to a death march to KZ Bergen-Belsen. The date and place of her death are unknown. Officially, the date of her death was defined as 31 December 1944 by a Berlin court in 1948. Relatives set a memorial stone in Bergen-Belsen, naming "March 1945" as the date of her death.

== Early life ==
According to Yad Vashem, which has based its profile of Schragenheim on data presented in the German Federal Archives publication, "The Memorial Book of the Federal Archives for the Victims of the Persecution of Jews in Germany (1933-1945)", Schragenheim was born in Berlin, Germany on 9 March 1922. Her leftist Jewish parents worked as dentists. Her father, Albert Schragenheim, had served in World War I as a member of the German army. Her mother, Erna Schragemheim, died in 1930 from a traffic accident, and her father died from a heart attack in 1935. By July 1944, her stepmother, Kate Hammerschalg, moved to Palestine to escape persecution and her sister Irene was living in England.

== World War II ==
Employed during her early 20s as an editorial assistant by a Berlin-based publishing company which was sympathetic to the Nazi regime, Felice Schragenheim joined the German resistance to Nazism. As a member of the resistance, Schragenheim smuggled information, procured weapons, and smuggled Jewish children out of the country.

Facing increased scrutiny by Nazi officials for her resistance work in 1942, Schragenheim was introduced by an acquaintance, who was employed as a housekeeper in the Berlin household of Günther Wust, a Nazi soldier, to Wust's wife, Charlotte Elisabeth "Lilly" Wust, who was residing in Berlin-Schmargendorf with her four children while her husband was away at war. Initially introduced by her alias "Felice Schröder", she eventually grew close enough to Wust to confide in her. Telling Wust her true name and revealing her history as a Jewish member of the German Resistance, Schragenheim soon fell in love.

Their courtship was traditional, according to Kate Connolly, the Berlin correspondent for The Guardian US at the time of her 2001 interview with Lilly Wust. After their introduction, Schragenheim "would come to tea at Lilly's almost daily, bringing flowers and poems. In between, the two would write to each other." When Wust was hospitalized with dental sepsis in March 1943, Schragenheim "brought red roses every day.... On March 25, the two became 'engaged', signing written declarations of their love, which they sealed with a marriage contract three months later."

The couple began living together at Wust's home in Berlin after Wust filed for divorce from her husband in 1942. They remained a couple until July 1944 when Schragenheim was reported to Nazi officials and captured by the Gestapo. Arrested at the home she shared with Wust, Schragenheim was taken to the Schulstrasse transit camp in Berlin; held there until 4 September 1944, she was subsequently deported to the Theresienstadt concentration camp in Czechoslovakia. Despite the danger, Wust made repeated visits to, and exchanged love letters with, Schragenheim at Schulstrasse. Schragenheim also was inspired to write a love poem for Wust.

While Schragenheim was imprisoned at Theresienstadt, Wust attempted to arrange a visit, but was refused by the camp's commandant. Before the couple could reunite, Schragenheim was deported to the Auschwitz concentration camp. Sent on one or two death marches in December 1944, according to various historical accounts (one from Auschwitz to the Gross-Rosen concentration camp and the other from Gross-Rosen to the Bergen-Belsen concentration camp), Schragenheim is believed to have died on New Year's Eve (31 December 1944), according to historians at Yad Vashem. Although her exact fate was never able to be determined, a Berlin court issued a ruling in 1948 which set her official death date as 31 December 1944.

== Memorials ==
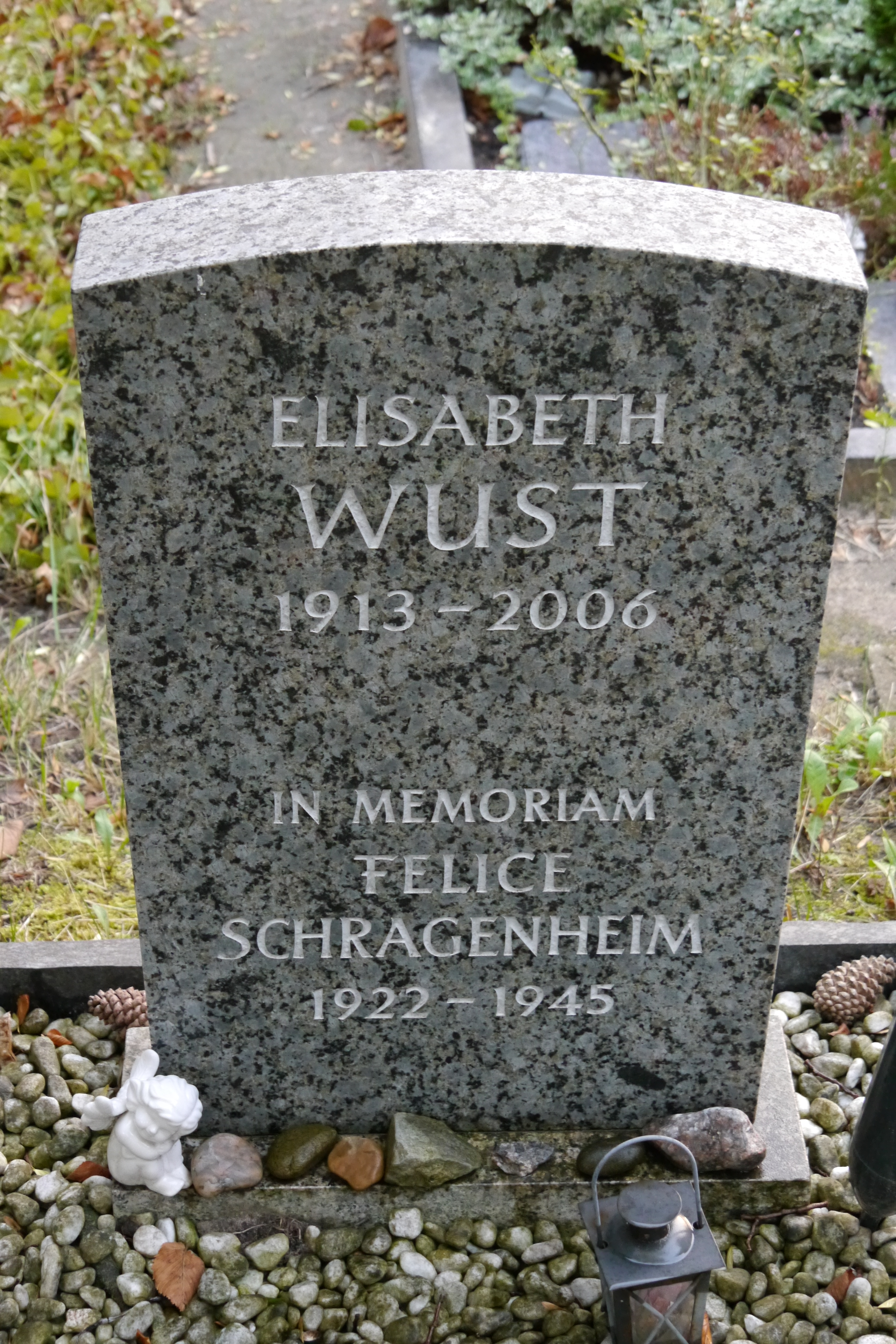
Gravestone of Elisabeth "Lilly" Wust, Dorfkirche Giesensdorf, Lichterfelde (Berlin), Germany (CC-by-SA 3.0).

Elisabeth Wust went on to survive Felice Schragenheim by more than sixty years. After her death on 31 March 2006 and subsequent burial at Dorfkirche Giesensdorf (the cemetery of the Giesensdorf village church), in Lichterfelde (Berlin), Germany, a headstone memorializing her relationship with Schragenheim was placed on her grave.

Schragenheim's relatives established a memorial for her, placing a memorial stone at the site of the former Bergen-Belsen concentration camp; this marker notes that Schragenheim's death occurred in March 1945.

== Legacy ==
During the early to mid-1990s, Lilly Wust sold the rights to the story of her love affair with Felice Schragenheim to Austrian journalist Erica Fischer, who studied Schragenheim's poetry and the couple's letters, researched the couple's lives further, and then wrote the 1994 book, Aimée & Jaguar: A Love Story, Berlin 1943, which was then adapted for the screen, becoming the 1999 film, Aimée & Jaguar. As of 2018, Fischer's book had been translated into 20 languages.

Interviewed in 2001, the 89-year-old Wust recalled:

It was the tenderest love you could imagine.... I was fairly experienced with men, but with Felice I reached a far deeper under-standing of sex than ever before. ... There was an immediate attraction, and we flirted outrageously. ... I began to feel alive as I never had before....She was my other half, literally my reflection, my mirror image, and for the first time I found love aesthetically beautiful, and so tender. ... Twice since she left, I've felt her breath, and a warm presence next to me. I dream that we will meet again - I live in hope.
