= Creature (1999 film) =

American documentary film (1999) directed by Parris Patton

- Theatrical release poster
- Directed by: Parris Patton
- Produced by: Don Lepore
- Starring: Stacey Hollywood, Filberto Ascencio, Butch Dean, Dusty Dean
- Cinematography: John Travers
- Edited by: Parris Patton
- Music by: Chad Smith
- Production company: Grapevine Films
- Distributed by: 7th Art
- Release date: June 3, 1999
- Running time: 76 minutes
- Country: United States
- Language: English

Creature is a 1999 documentary film that was directed by Parris Patton. The film was released on June 3, 1999, and follows the life of American transgender actor, model, and club personality Stacey "Hollywood" Dean.

== Synopsis ==
Born as Kyle Dean in a conservative area of North Carolina, Stacey "Hollywood" Dean was never truly accepted in her high school and was always called "creature" because of her desire to become a woman. Ostracized, Stacey left her home town to go to Hollywood, hoping to find more acceptance there. Four years later Stacey is returning home to visit with her parents in her new persona as Stacey Hollywood.

== Cast ==
- Stacey "Hollywood" Dean as herself
- Filberto Ascencio as Barbarella
- Butch Dean as himself
- Dusty Dean as herself

== Reception ==
Critical reception has been positive and the documentary received praise from The Advocate. Film Threat gave Creature four stars, praising Patton for not including a voiceover narration and saying that it was "the purest form of documentary: it simply presents its subject, lets the people talk and does no moralising or manipulation at all." Variety also gave a positive review and they expected that the film would "garner strong interest from small-screen programmers and enjoy thriving vid life as an inspiration to those similarly inclined, as well as limited illumination for those mystified by the milieu."

Creature premiered at the 1999 Seattle International Film Festival and was later nominated for a GLAAD Media Award for Outstanding Documentary. It received a Best Documentary nomination at the 1999 Chicago International Film Festival and in 2002 was broadcast on Cinemax.
