= Gandi Mukli =

German actor

Gandi Mukli (born 1968, Munich, West Germany) is a German actor of Syrian descent.

== Life ==
Mukli was born in 1968 in Munich to a Syrian father and a Turkish mother. He grew up in Munich and lives in Cologne. His early roles were in small films such as, among other things, Ein Stückchen Himmel and Kir Royal.

After his debut cinematic appearance in the Kadir Sözen film Winterblume (1997), he played the leading role in the Kutluğ Ataman film Lola und Bilidikid in 1998. Films and TV roles were followed. His most recent work was Kiss me Kismet (2006) and Evet, I Do! (2009). Between 1998 and 2004, he had several roles in the ARD TV series Lindenstraße.

The Migration Audio Archive contains an autobiographical text of Mukli.
