= Eva Blond =

- Starring: Corinna Harfouch; Erdal Yıldız; Herbert Knaup; Gottfried Breitfuss
- Country of origin: Germany
- No. of episodes: 6

Original release
- Network: Sat.1
- Release: 2002 – 2006

Eva Blond is a German television series that follows the detective Eva Blond (Corinna Harfouch) and her colleague Alyans (Erdal Yıldız). It aired from 2002 to 2006 on Sat.1.

== See also ==
- List of German television series
