= Aimée & Jaguar =

1999 film

- Film poster
- Directed by: Max Färberböck
- Written by: Max Färberböck; Erica Fischer (book); Rona Munro
- Produced by: Hanno Huth; Günter Rohrbach; Lew Rywin
- Starring: Maria Schrader; Juliane Köhler
- Cinematography: Tony Imi
- Edited by: Barbara Hennings
- Music by: Jan A. P. Kaczmarek
- Distributed by: Senator Film
- Release date: 10 February 1999
- Running time: 125 minutes
- Country: Germany
- Language: German

Aimée & Jaguar is a 1999 German drama film set in Berlin during World War II. It was written and directed by Max Färberböck and based on Erica Fischer's book chronicling the actual lives of Lilly Wust and Felice Schragenheim during that time. Before Fischer's bestseller, American journalist, author, and noted Holocaust researcher Charles Brady tracked down Wust, who had previously been thought to be a victim of the Holocaust. It was over a year and a half, however, before Wust was able to confide in Brady and tell him her whole story. They remained close friends for 20 years until her death in 2006.

Fischer's book contains photos of the many letters shared between herself and Wust, and of official correspondence after World War II in regard to Felice's whereabouts. The movie stars Juliane Köhler as Lilly Wust and Maria Schrader as Felice Schragenheim, as well as Johanna Wokalek, Elisabeth Degen, Heike Makatsch and Detlev Buck.

== Plot ==
The film explores the lives of Felice Schragenheim (Maria Schrader), a Jewish woman who has assumed a false name and belongs to an underground organization, and Lilly Wust (Juliane Köhler), a married mother of four who is unsatisfied with her philandering Nazi officer husband.

The film begins in 1997, with an 83-year-old Lilly (played by Inge Keller) taking up residence in a dilapidated flat that once served as an underground hideout. Brought to a retirement home, Lilly encounters her old maid Ilse (played by Johanna Wokalek in the 1940s scenes and by Kyra Mladeck in 1997 scenes), who was rounded up during 1945, and is already a tenant.

In 1943 Felice, assuming a false last name and working as a journalist at a Nazi newspaper, meets Lilly via her friend and sometime lover Ilse, who works as Lilly's housekeeper. Instantly smitten, she takes the initiative in the love affair by sending flagrant letters to Lilly and signing her name as Jaguar, much to Ilse's dismay. One fateful afternoon Felice, Ilse and their friends Klara and Lotte are accosted by German soldiers. All but Lotte manage to escape. After Lotte is shot dead, the soldiers find no identification on her body except a photograph of her and Felice. Lonely due to the absence of her husband at the front, Lilly engages in a series of affairs with other men, but is disillusioned by her callous treatment at the hands of her latest lover, another Nazi officer. She grows closer to Felice, who attempts to kiss her during a New Year's Eve Party in her Berlin apartment after Lilly discovers her husband with Ilse. Lilly rejects Felice but, as her husband tries to make amends the following morning, Lilly realizes she has never loved him and reconciles with Felice.

With her husband again away at war, Lilly and Felice begin a shaky but intense relationship. The film features both erotic encounters and sentimental love poems (quoted from the book) and, during one love scene, Felice proclaims Lilly Aimée to her Jaguar. On Lilly's birthday, Felice and her friends throw a party in her apartment that culminates in a lesbian orgy. Lilly is mortified when she sees Ilse and Felice kissing drunkenly, and is further disillusioned when Felice rejects her advances for the night. The next morning, Lilly's husband arrives on special leave for his wife's birthday only to witness the aftermath of the previous night's events. Although enraged, he vows to not punish her for her indiscretion so long that their marriage and life remain intact, but Lilly instead surprises him by asking for a divorce. Afraid that Lilly's husband may turn them in, Felice and her friends stop seeing Lilly for the sake of their own survival. Heartbroken, Lilly holes up in her apartment, eventually sending her children away to safety, and erupts in anger when Felice finally visits her after several weeks. Felice reveals the truth that she is Jewish and feared for her life, and the two make up.

After the 20 July Plot, Felice and her friends fear for their lives and arrange to flee Germany before they are rounded up. At the last moment, Felice decides to stay in spite of the danger so that she may remain with Lilly. After a day of frolicking in the countryside, the two return to Lilly's apartment, where Felice is captured by the Gestapo, who have identified her through the photograph of her and Lotte. She is sent to Theresienstadt concentration camp, from where she still manages to correspond with Lilly, but all contact is lost by the end of 1944.

Lilly and Ilse reminisce about times past as the film ends. Lilly, though saddened by the tragedy that she has caused her friends and lovers, is unable to imagine how her life could have been any different, given her obsessive live-for-today-for-tomorrow-we-die mentality, common among besieged Berliners. Lilly Wust lived in Berlin until her death on 31 March 2006. The tagline of the film is "Love Transcends Death".

== Cast ==
- Maria Schrader as Felice Schragenheim (Jaguar)
- Juliane Köhler as Lilly Wust (Aimée)
- Johanna Wokalek as Ilse
- Heike Makatsch as Klärchen
- Elisabeth Degen as Lotte
- Detlev Buck as Günther Wust
- Inge Keller as Lilly Wust (1997)
- Kyra Mladeck as Ilse (1997)
- Sarah Camp as Frau Kappler
- Klaus Manchen as Herr Kappler
- Margit Bendokat as Frau Jäger
- Jochen Stern as Werner Lause
- Peter Weck as Chefredakteur Keller
- Lia Dultzkaya as Hulda
- Dani Levy as Fritz Borchert
- Rüdiger Hacker as Ernst Biermösel

== Awards ==
Köhler and Schrader shared win of the Silver Bear for Best Actress at the 49th Berlin International Film Festival. The film was also nominated for the Golden Globe Award for Best Foreign Film.

== See also ==
- List of submissions to the 72nd Academy Awards for Best Foreign Language Film
- List of German submissions for the Academy Award for Best Foreign Language Film
