= Marta Hillers =

German journalist and writer (1911– 2001)

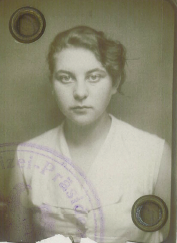
Marta Hillers

Marta Hillers (May 26, 1911 – June 16, 2001) was a German journalist, and the author of the memoir Eine Frau in Berlin (A Woman in Berlin), published anonymously in 1959 and 2003 in German. It is the diary of a German woman from 20 April to 22 June 1945, during and after the Battle of Berlin. The book details the author's rape, in the context of mass rape by the occupying forces, and how she and many other German women chose to take a Soviet officer as a protector.

The book was first published in English in 1954 in the United States. When it was published in Germany in 1959, the author was accused of "besmirching the honour of German women." Hillers refused to have another edition published in her lifetime. Having married and moved to Switzerland, Hillers left journalism and did not publish another major work. She died in 2001.

A new edition of her book was published posthumously in Germany in 2003, again anonymously. It met wide critical acclaim and was on the bestseller list for weeks. A controversy broke out when a literary editor revealed the author as Hillers. No one else has been suggested. New English editions were published in the United Kingdom and the United States in 2005, as well as in seven other languages.

The book was adapted as a film and released first in 2008 in Germany and Poland. In the United States it is known as A Woman in Berlin. Coincidentally, also in 2008, the English translation of the book by Philip Boehm (Virago, 2005) was dramatised as a one-woman monologue, by the playwright Iain McClure, and staged at the New Works, New Worlds Festival at the Arches Theatre, Glasgow, in 2009.

== Early life and education ==
Marta Hillers was born in Krefeld, Germany, on May 26, 1911. After attending local schools, she studied in Paris at the Sorbonne. She later travelled extensively throughout Europe, including the Soviet Union. She spoke French and some Russian in addition to her native German.

== Career ==
Hillers worked as a journalist in Berlin, writing for magazines and newspapers. She also did some minor work for the Nazi regime but is not believed to have been a Party member.

In 1945 she was in Berlin when the Soviets captured it. During this period, she kept a diary, describing how the women, children, and elderly men survived in the city in those days. In her diary entry of the 11 May 1945 she made an inventory:

On the one hand things are good for me. I’m fresh and healthy. I have not suffered any physical harm. I have the feeling that I’m excellently equipped for life, as if I had webbed feet for the mud. I am adapted to the world. I’m not delicate…On the other side there are only minuses. I no longer know what I’m supposed to do in the world. I’m indispensable to no one. I’m just standing around, waiting. I can see neither goal nor task before me.

In later entries she describes that she and other women of any age were repeatedly raped by Red Army soldiers. To protect themselves, she and other women took Soviet soldiers as protectors; she chose the highest-ranking man she could find, and described this as "sleeping for food." An estimated 100,000 women in Berlin were raped during the occupation. She stopped writing the diary at the end of June following the return of her fiancé Gerd from the war.

Following the war and encouraged by a friend, she had her memoir published in English in the United States in 1954. She kept her identity anonymous. Hillers married in the 1950s and moved to Basel, Switzerland. In 1959, she had her memoir published in German in Switzerland, again anonymously. Based on the negative reviews it received in Germany and accusations about her having offended the honor of German women, she refused to have any new editions published in her lifetime. She died on June 16, 2001, in Basel. A Woman in Berlin was her only major work.

== A Woman in Berlin ==
With the aid of German author Kurt Marek, Hillers published her book in the United States in 1954. Marek agreed to her wish to be anonymous and arranged for a translation into English. In 1955 the book was published in the United Kingdom by Secker and Warburg.

In 1959 Hillers published her memoir in German, by a Swiss publisher, Kossodo, and again insisted on anonymity. The book received hostile reviews in Germany and did not sell well. Hillers (whose name was not revealed at this time) was accused of "besmirching the honour of German women", of "shameless immorality" and of anti-communist propaganda. One review accused her of falsifying her account and of doing a "disservice to Berlin women."

Hans Magnus Enzensberger, who published the 2003 German edition, wrote about the book's reception in the postwar years:

"German readers were obviously not ready to face some uncomfortable truths... German women were not supposed to talk about the reality of rapes; and German men preferred not to be seen as impotent onlookers when the victorious Russians claimed their spoils of war. The author's attitude was an aggravating factor: devoid of self-pity, with a clear-eyed view of her compatriots' behaviour before and after the Nazi regime's collapse, everything she wrote flew in the face of the reigning post-war complacency and amnesia."

After this controversy, Hillers refused to allow the book to be republished in her lifetime. It circulated in Germany in photocopied form and was popular among German feminists in the 1970s. Hans Magnus Enzensberger, a poet and essayist, had learned that Hannelore Marek held the copyright and had agreed to Hillers' prohibition against publication in her lifetime. She contacted him when the former journalist died.

Enzensberger, a poet and essayist, arranged publication of a new edition of Eine Frau in Berlin as part of his Die Andere Bibliothek series. In 2005, the memoir was republished in a new English translation, by Virago Press, a feminist publishing house in London and in the United States by Macmillan. It became a best seller in both German and English editions.

Journalists quickly investigated in 2003 to determine the identity of the author. Jens Bisky, the literary editor of the Süddeutsche Zeitung, wrote in September 2003 that Hillers may have been the anonymous author. He wrote a profile of her life, noting that she was a journalist who worked on magazines and newspapers during the Nazi era and had done some minor work for the Nazi government. He thought she was likely not a member of the Nazi Party. Hannelore Marek, who holds the copyright, did not confirm that Hillers was the author of A Woman in Berlin. Enzensberger denounced Bisky's comments as "Skandal-journalismus". No other candidate for the authorship of the book has been suggested.

Marek had noted in his afterword to the 1954 English edition that the book was based on a typescript drawn from handwritten notes. His widow, Hannelore Marek, kept these after his death in 1971. At the time of the Bisky revelations in 2003, Christian Esch, writing in the Berliner Zeitung, noted differences between the editions and the Marek-held notes. He said that if the diary were to be accepted as a fully authentic work, the originals would have to be examined by experts.

Subsequently, an examination of the notes was done by Walter Kempowski on behalf of the publishing house. He concluded that it was a genuine diary of the war period. He noted the typescript and the published book contain material not in the diary, but this is not unusual as books are prepared for publication. Antony Beevor, a British historian who wrote a "magisterial book" on the Battle of Berlin, confirmed his belief in the book's authenticity. He said it conformed to his own detailed knowledge of the period and the other primary sources he has accumulated. The book has been published in seven languages in addition to English and German.

The book was adapted as a German feature film. Max Färberböck directed Anonyma - Eine Frau in Berlin (2008), starring Nina Hoss as the Woman; it was first released in Germany and Poland. The film was released in the United States as A Woman in Berlin (2009).

Unconnected to the film, a dramatisation of the English translation of the book by Philip Boehm, published by Virago in 2005, was written as a one-woman monologue, by Iain McClure, in 2008 and staged at the New Works, New Worlds Festival at the Arches Theatre, Glasgow, in 2009. To obtain one-off permission for his production, McClure was required to submit successive re-drafts of his play script to the German publisher, Eichborn, right up to the day of first performance, to ensure that no content was included, even imaginary, which might compromise the author's anonymity. The production was directed by Deborah Neville and performed by Molly Taylor.

== English language editions of the memoir ==
- A Woman in Berlin, New York: Harcourt, Brace, Jovanovich, 1954.
- A Woman in Berlin, London: Martin Secker and Warburg, 1955.
- Eine Frau in Berlin, Geneva: Kossodo, 1959
- Eine Frau in Berlin, diary from 20 April to 22 June 1945, Die Andere Bibliothek Band Nr. 221, ISBN 3-8218-4534-1
- A Woman in Berlin, 2005 paperback, 320 pages, Virago Press Ltd, ISBN 1-84408-112-5
- A Woman in Berlin: Eight Weeks in the Conquered City: A Diary, edited by Philip Boehm, New York: Macmillan, 2005
