= Mordkommission Istanbul =

- Starring: Erol Sander, Oscar Ortega Sánchez
- Country of origin: Germany

Original release
- Release: 2008

Mordkommission Istanbul (Istanbul Homicide Unit) is a German television series.

== Plot ==
Istanbul police inspector Mehmet Özakin is in charge of murder investigations, mostly in the Turkish city. A very modern Turk, he uses up to date Western methods, without prejudice, assisted by Mustafa Tombul. Even his private life is progressive, his wife Sevim being on the former imperial capital's university staff.

== See also ==
- List of German television series
