= Max Färberböck =

German filmmaker

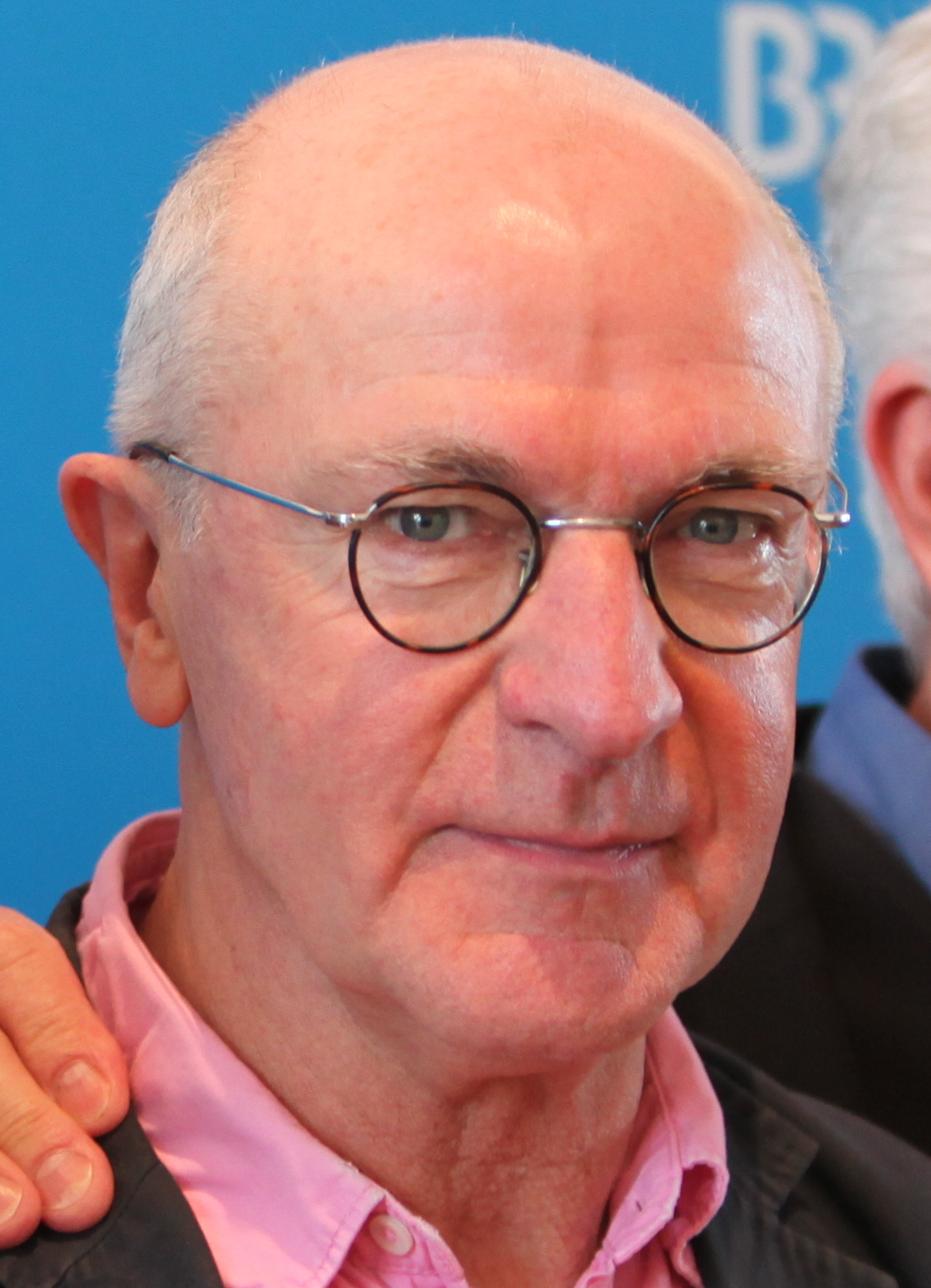
- Born: 22 September 1950 (age 75); Brannenburg, Bavaria, West Germany
- Occupations: Film director, screenwriter
- Years active: 1990–present

Max Färberböck (born 22 September 1950) is a German film director and writer. He was born in Brannenburg, Bavaria. He began his career at theaters in Buenos Aires and in Italy. He later studied at the University of Television and Film in Munich and worked for Constantin Film and as an assistant for Peter Zadek at the Deutsches Schauspielhaus in Hamburg. After producing several plays at theaters in Hamburg, Heidelberg and Cologne, he began to write and direct episodes for the TV series Der Fahnder.

Later Färberböck produced several TV films, before making his first feature film, Aimée & Jaguar (1998). It was nominated for the Golden Globe Award for Best Foreign Language Film. The film was also nominated for the Golden Bear at 49th Berlin International Film Festival.

He directed A Woman in Berlin (2008), based on the memoir by the same name. A new edition had been published in Germany in 2003, two years after the author's death. This controversial work dealt with the experiences of women in Berlin in the last weeks of the Battle of Berlin and occupation by Soviet Union troops at the end of World War II. The author is reputed to be the late journalist, Marta Hillers, who died in 2001.

== Selected filmography ==
- Der Fahnder (1990, TV series, 3 episodes)
- Schlafende Hunde (1992, TV film)
- Einer zahlt immer (1993, TV film)
- Bella Block: Die Kommissarin (1994, TV series episode)
- Bella Block: Liebestod (1995, TV series episode)
- Aimée und Jaguar (1999)
- Jenseits (2002, TV film)
- September (2003)
- A Woman in Berlin (2008)
- Bella Block: Vorsehung (2009, TV series episode)
- Tatort: Am Ende des Flurs (2014, TV series episode)
- Tatort: Der Himmel ist ein Platz auf Erden (2015, TV series episode)
- Tatort: Mia san jetz da wo's weh tut (2016, TV series episode)
- Tatort: Ich töte niemand (2018, TV series episode)
- Tatort: Die Nacht gehört dir (2020, TV series episode)
