= Lilly Wust =

German writer

Charlotte Wust
- Born: Charlotte Elisabeth Kappler; 1 November 1913; Berlin, Germany
- Died: 31 March 2006 (aged 92); Berlin, Germany
- Burial place: Dorfkirche Giesensdorf, Lichterfelde, Berlin, Germany
- Other names: Aimée, Lilly
- Spouse: Günther Wust
- Partner: Felice Schragenheim
- Children: 4 (Bernd, Eberhard, Reinhard, Albrecht)
- Awards: Federal Cross of Merit

Charlotte Elisabeth Wust (née Kappler; 1 November 1913 – 31 March 2006) was a German housewife, the wife of a German banking accountant and soldier during World War II. She was known for her romantic relationship with Felice Schragenheim, a Jewish member of the German Resistance. The story of their relationship is portrayed in the 1999 film Aimée & Jaguar, and in a book of the same name by Erica Fischer.

She was declared Righteous Among the Nations on 31 August 1995 by Yad Vashem for her efforts to rescue Jewish women and shield them from Nazi persecution during World War II.

== Early life ==
Wust was born in 1913 to a "traditional Berlin family". Her parents were former members of the Communist Party, but she grew up uninterested in politics. Wust had crushes on women during her adolescence, although she did not realize this until later in life. Around her 20th birthday, she fell in love with and married her husband, Günther, a banking accountant with Nazi sympathies. However, the marriage was ultimately an unhappy one for both Elisabeth and Günther, and both entered into extramarital affairs. One of these affairs resulted in Elisabeth's youngest son.

Following the birth of her fourth child, Wust became eligible for the Mother Cross, which also allowed her to employ a housekeeper, a position that was filled by Inge Wolf, a member of the German Resistance.

== World War II and the rescue of Jewish women from Nazi persecution ==
Following the outbreak of World War II, Wust's husband left home to serve in the Wehrmacht, although he was able to make visits home around every two weeks. Wust resided in Berlin-Schmargendorf with her four children and housekeeper Inge Wolf. Wolf introduced Wust to a 20-year-old woman named Felice Schragenheim (alias Felice Schröder) in November 1942. Wust began hosting gatherings of Wolf and Schragenheim's friends, many of whom were also members of the Resistance. After spending time with her and falling in love with her, Wust learned that Schragenheim was in need of protection from Nazi authorities due to her status as a member of the German Resistance and as a Jewish woman.

Their courtship was traditional, according to Kate Connolly, the Berlin correspondent for The Guardian US at the time of her 2001 interview of Lilly Wust. After their introduction, Schragenheim "would come to tea at Lilly's almost daily, bringing flowers and poems. In between, the two would write to each other." When Wust was hospitalized with dental sepsis in March 1943, Schragenheim "brought red roses every day.... On March 25, the two became 'engaged', signing written declarations of their love, which they sealed with a marriage contract three months later".

Interviewed in 2001, the 89-year-old Wust recalled her time with Schragenheim:

It was the tenderest love you could imagine.... I was fairly experienced with men, but with Felice I reached a far deeper under-standing of sex than ever before....There was an immediate attraction, and we flirted outrageously.... I began to feel alive as I never had before....She was my other half, literally my reflection, my mirror image, and for the first time I found love aesthetically beautiful, and so tender...

The couple began living together, and Wust filed for divorce from her husband in the summer of 1943; they remained a couple until July 1944, when Schragenheim was reported to Nazi officials and captured by the Gestapo. Arrested at the home she shared with Wust, Schragenheim was taken to the Schulstrasse transit camp in Berlin and held there until 4 September 1944. She was then deported to the Theresienstadt concentration camp in Czechoslovakia. Despite the danger, Wust made repeated visits to Schragenheim at Schulstrasse, and also attempted to arrange a visit with her at Theresienstadt, but was refused by the camp's commandant. According to Yad Vashem historians, "Wust had only been able to escape punishment [for hiding Schragenheim in her home] because she was the mother of four young children whose father was missing in action".

Just over a month later, on 9 October 1944, Schragenheim was transported to the Auschwitz concentration camp after being sentenced to death. She is believed to have died on 31 December 1944. Other historians have indicated that, sometime in December 1944, Schragenheim and others prisoners were sent by Auschwitz officials on a death march to the Gross-Rosen concentration camp and also possibly on a second death march to the Bergen-Belsen concentration camp. Although her exact fate was never able to be determined, a Berlin court issued a ruling in 1948 which set her death date as 31 December 1944.

As a result of her involvement with Schragenheim, Elisabeth Wust faced increased scrutiny and harassment by Nazi officials, and was required to check in with local police every two days after Schragenheim's arrest, but this increased danger only strengthened Wust's resolve to shield other women at risk of a fate similar to that being experienced by Schragenheim. After meeting Lucie Friedländer, Katja Lazerstein, and Dr. Rosa Ohlendorf three weeks before Christmas in 1944, Wust then began hiding the women in an upper level of her Berlin home. All three of the rescued women went on to survive the war; however, Friedländer, having been so badly traumatized by her experiences, ultimately committed suicide.

== Post war life and death ==
Following the war, Wust attempted suicide and later entered into an "absurd marriage taken in panic" which lasted 11 months. Wust never entered into a relationship with another woman.

One of Wust's sons, Everhard, emigrated to Israel in 1961.

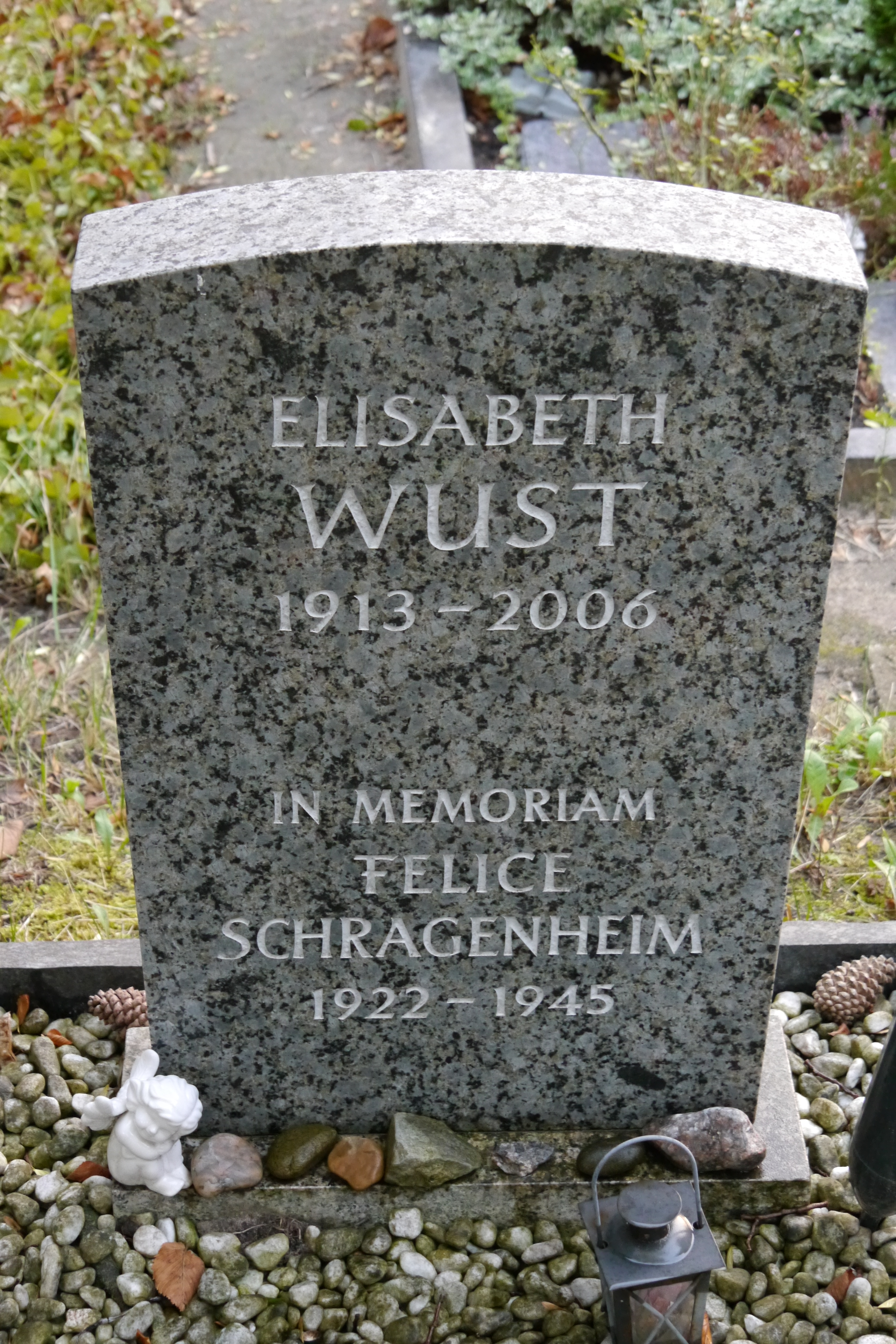
Gravestone of Elisabeth "Lilly" Wust, Dorfkirche Giesensdorf, Lichterfelde (Berlin), Germany (CC-by-SA 3.0).

Elisabeth Wust died at the age of 92 on 31 March 2006, due to complications from old age. She was buried at Dorfkirche Giesensdorf (the cemetery of the Giesensdorf village church), in Lichterfelde (Berlin), Germany. Her gravestone also serves as a memorial marker for Schragenheim.

== Legacy and honors ==
In 1981, in honor of her efforts to hide Schragenheim three women during the war, Wust was given the German Federal Service Cross. The publicity around this award brought Wust relationship with Schragenheim to light.

During the early to mid-1990s, Elisabeth Wust sold the rights to the story of her love affair with Felice Schragenheim to Austrian journalist Erica Fischer, who studied Schragenheim's poetry and the couple's letters, researched the couple's lives further, and then wrote the 1994 book, Aimée & Jaguar: A Love Story, Berlin 1943, which was then adapted for the screen, becoming the 1999 film, Aimée & Jaguar. Wust expressed approval of both the book and the film. As of 2018, Fischer's book had been translated into 20 languages.

On 31 August 1995, Elisabeth Wust was declared Righteous Among the Nations by Yad Vashem for her efforts to shield Jewish women from Nazi persecution.
