= Simon Block =

British screenwriter and producer

- Occupations: Screenwriter; Producer
- Known for: Home Fires; Hotel Babylon

Simon Block is a British screenwriter and producer best known for his work on the Julie Summers-inspired ITV series Home Fires.

== Career ==
Block wrote on several popular dramas, such as Lewis, New Tricks and Hotel Babylon, being a recurring writer with his writing credits appearing Series 3 Episode 1, Series 2 Episode 8 and Series 2 Episode 2. Block wrote the first episode of Series 1 of Home Fires alongside Julie Summers who inspired the show with her book. It is about the life of Women's Institute members on the Home Front during the Second World War. The first series is set between September 1939 and early 1940. However following the first episode Block became the main writer, writing 10 episodes to date.

He co-wrote the historical drama The Physician, based on the novel of the same name by Noah Gordon. The film stars Tom Payne, Ben Kingsley (as physician Avicenna), Stellan Skarsgård, Olivier Martinez and Emma Rigby. In 2015, Block wrote three episodes for the historical TV drama A.D. The Bible Continues: "The Tomb Is Open", "The Body Is Gone" and "The Spirit Arrives". In 2020, he wrote the Second World War television film The Windermere Children.
