= The Last Jew (disambiguation) =

The Last Jew is a 2000 novel by American writer Noah Gordon.

The Last Jew (Hebrew: היהודי האחרון, romanized: Ha-Yehudi Ha'Aharon) may also refer to:

- The Last Jew (Kaniuk novel) (2006) by Yoram Kaniuk
- The Last Jew (1946) by Ya'akov Winschel, an alternative history after the Nazis won World War II
