= Anno Saul =

German screenwriter and film director (born 1963)

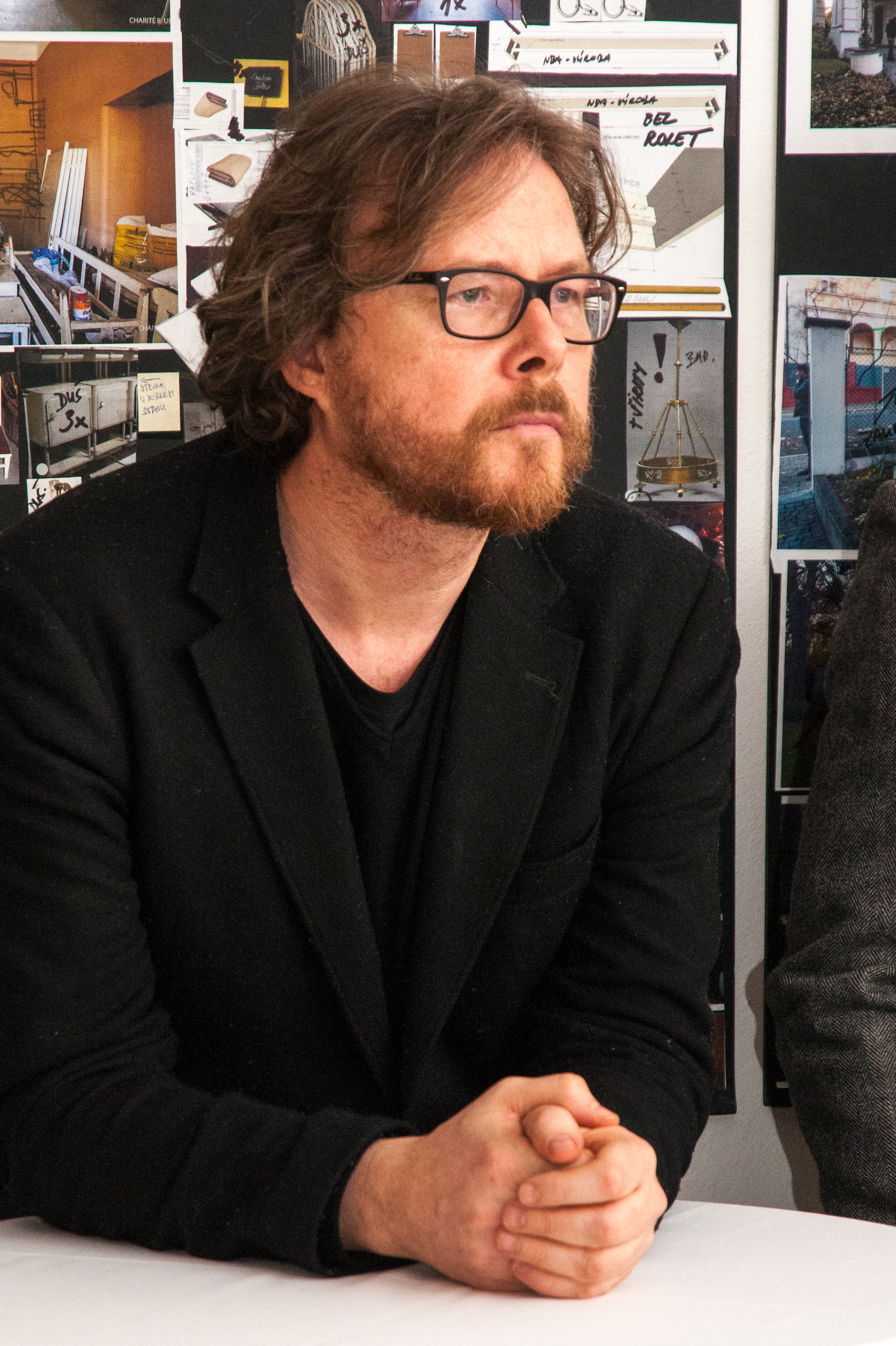
Saul in 2018

Anno Saul (born 14 November 1963) is a German screenwriter and film director.

== Biography ==
Born in Bonn, West Germany, the son of a physician, Saul studied at the Peter-Joerres-Gymnasium in Bad Neuenahr-Ahrweiler and afterwards, graduating from the Munich School of Philosophy, and then, from 1985 to 1990, filmed a feature film at the University of Television and Film Munich. In 1987, he created a Bayerischer Rundfunk teleplay.

In 1991, Saul received the Max Ophüls film festival prize for the film Unter Freunden. After several television films, he filmed his feature film debut, Grüne Wüste ("Green Desert"), in 1998 with Martina Gedeck. After his television film Novizin, he directed his second feature film, Kebab Connection, based on a book by Fatih Akin, Ruth Thoma and Jan Berger. In 2006, he directed the movie Where Is Fred? with Til Schweiger, Jürgen Vogel, Christoph Maria Herbst, and Alexandra Maria Lara. This was followed in 2009 by the mystery thriller The Door with Mads Mikkelsen, Jessica Schwarz, and Thomas Thieme. In 2013, he also directed the comedy Therapy Crashers with Marie Bäumer, Milan Peschel, Fahri Yardım, and Josefine Preuß.

Saul was a lecturer at the Internationale Filmschule Köln. Since 2010, he has been a full member of the board of directors of the Deutsche Filmakademie in the field of directing. He lives in Berlin.

== Awards ==
- 1991: Max-Ophüls-Preis for Unter Freunden
- Publikumspreis at the Cinequest Film Festival in San Jose, California, United States, for Grüne Wüste
- 2010: Hauptpreis "Best Picture" at the Tromsø International Film Festival for The Door
- 2010: "Le Grand Prix" at the Festival international du film fantastique de Gérardmer for The Door
- 2010: The "Silver Melias" at the Brussels International Fantastic Film Festival for The Door

== Filmography ==
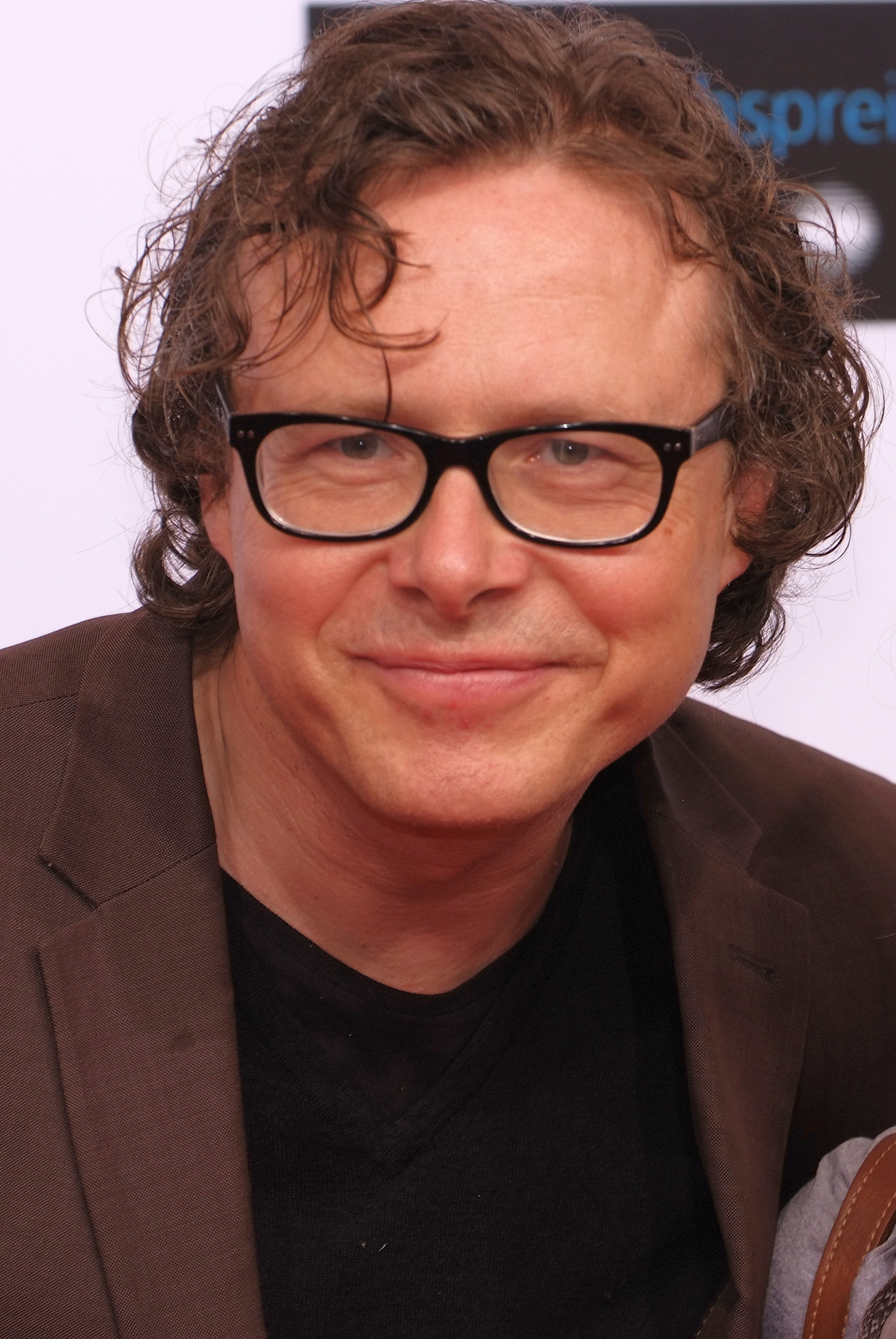
Saul in 2012

- 1990: Unter Freunden (short)
- 1996: Und morgen fängt das Leben an (TV film)
- 1997: Alte Liebe, alte Sünde (TV film)
- 1998: Blind Date – Flirt mit Folgen (TV film)
- 1998: Zur Zeit zu zweit (TV film)
- 1999: Grüne Wüste
- 2002: Die Novizin (TV film)
- 2005: Kebab Connection
- 2006: Where Is Fred?
- 2007–2014: Der Kommissar und das Meer (TV series, 7 episodes, including pilot)
- 2009: The Door
- 2011–2015: Reiff für die Insel (TV series, 3 episodes, including pilot)
- 2014: Therapy Crashers
- 2013–2018: Nord Nord Mord (TV series, 5 episodes)
- 2016–2017: München Mord (TV series, 3 episodes)
- 2019: Charité (TV series, 6 episodes)
