= The Physician (2013 film) =

- Theatrical release poster
- German: Der Medicus
- Directed by: Philipp Stölzl
- Written by: Philipp Stölzl; Simon Block; Christoph Müller
- Screenplay by: Jan Berger
- Based on: The Physician by Noah Gordon
- Produced by: Wolf Bauer; Nico Hofmann
- Starring: Tom Payne; Ben Kingsley; Stellan Skarsgård; Olivier Martinez; Emma Rigby
- Cinematography: Hagen Bogdanski
- Edited by: Sven Budelmann
- Music by: Ingo Ludwig Frenzel
- Production companies: UFA Cinema; Degeto Film; Beta Cinema
- Distributed by: Universal Pictures International
- Release date: 25 December 2013
- Running time: 150 minutes (Theater); 180 minutes (TV series)
- Country: Germany
- Language: English
- Budget: $32 million
- Box office: $57,284,237

The Physician (German: Der Medicus) is a 2013 English-language German historical drama film based on the novel of the same name by Noah Gordon. The film, co-written and directed by Philipp Stölzl, focuses on an orphan from an 11th-century English town whose mother died of side sickness. The boy vows to study medicine and decides to travel to Persia.

The film stars Tom Payne, Ben Kingsley (as physician Ibn Sina), Stellan Skarsgård, Olivier Martinez, and Emma Rigby in lead roles.

== Plot ==
In medieval Europe, the Church is fighting against 'black magic'. The medical knowledge of Greek physicians like Hippocrates and Galen had been lost to the medicine of medieval Europe. In 11th-century England, travelling barber surgeons attempted to supply medical care to the ordinary population, often at the risk of the Church persecuting them for witchcraft.

Robert Cole has an extraordinary gift, where he can sense when someone left untreated has a terminal illness. He notices this for the first time when he feels it as a little boy when his sick mother is dying of side sickness, a disease of which he was unaware. The young orphan joins an itinerant barber-surgeon who calls himself Barber. Barber teaches him the basics of medieval medicine, with services such as cupping therapy, bloodletting, and dental extraction. Even as an apprentice Rob recognizes the limitations of these simple practices. When Barber suffers from a cataract, Rob consults a Medicus for him. This Jewish doctor completely heals Barber of his cataracts. He learns a little bit of Jewish culture. He speaks with two children, Jesse and Benjamin. There, Rob sees for the first time a world map, and learns of the famous Ibn Sina, who teaches medicine in distant Kakuyid Persia. So he decides to train there to become a physician. During the Islamic Golden Age, the medicine in the medieval Islamic world is far more advanced than in Europe. The doctor, scientist and philosopher Ibn Sina teaches in Isfahan, the most important school for aspiring practitioners in the world at that time.

Rob is told Christians are forbidden to enter Muslim lands while Jews are tolerated. Upon arriving in Egypt, Rob therefore circumcises himself and calls himself Jesse ben Benjamin, pretending to be a Jew (Rob is, in fact, a Christian). In a caravan he meets Rebecca who reads to him from a book about Aladdin and Sinbad the Sailor. The caravan experiences a sandstorm, so Rob almost dies. When, after arriving in Isfahan, he asks for admission to the hospital and school of Ibn Sina, he is rejected and thrown out and beaten by guards. Lying in the street with a cut and a concussion he is found by the Guardian, so then he is taken in as a patient.

In a bimaristan (hospital) and madrasa (college), he is treated by Ibn Sina and admitted as a student to learn the basics of scientific medicine as well as other sciences and philosophy (including Aristotelian and Islamic philosophy). Rob learns to perform a medical history and medical examination including pulse diagnosis, the leech treatment, the use of opium, including the analgesic effect, and surgical procedures. After the Shah refuses a peace treaty with the Seljuks, the Seljuks send a man infected with the Black Death to deliberately infect the city. Thousands begin to die after being cared for by Ibn Sina and his students. Only by Rob's discovery and rapid application of basic hygienic principles is the plague overcome. Rob suggests that oriental rat fleas may be the carriers of the Black Death, and with rat poison the pest may be suppressed. Rob is reunited with Rebecca, who has come down with the plague, and is able to bond with her since her husband temporarily abandons the city, leaving her to become sick. Rob nurses her back to health, Rebecca makes a full recovery, and she and Rob become romantically involved and engage in extramarital sex right before Rebecca must return to her husband, who has returned to the city. Rebecca is impregnated as a result, and her husband eventually discovers this, which leads to her being sentenced to death by stoning.

The Christian, Jewish and Islamic religions influence the evaluation of medical science, and a conflict is sparked by the ethical assessment of the autopsy on the human body. As a Zoroastrian dies of side sickness, Rob learns from him that Zoroastrianism does not prohibit an adherent from undergoing autopsy after death. Rob secretly performs an autopsy on his body to deepen his knowledge of anatomy and to discover the inflamed vermiform appendix. When the mullahs discover what he has done, both Rob and Ibn Sina are sentenced to death for necromancy. Rebecca is about to be stoned for adultery when the Shah is apparently stricken with side sickness. Rob and Ibn Sina are freed so that Rob will perform an appendectomy, using anesthesia, on the Shah. Before beginning the surgery, Rob arranges for Rebecca to be rescued from her impending execution.

Isfahan is betrayed by the mullahs to the Seljuks, since they want to drive the Jewish community and Ibn Sina's madrasa out of the city. Mullah soldiers then arrive to attack the hospital. Ibn Sina heads to the burning library and transfers his medical writings to Rob Cole, and also awards him the medical title 'Hakim'. Ibn Sina then stays to die in the burning library.

Rob Cole, as well as others, escape through a gate the Shah has told them about while he and his men go to make a last stand against the Seljuks. Rob returns with Rebecca, as his wife, to London and establishes a hospital. The old Barber, Cole's first teacher, learns from a little boy about his former pupil's return and fame. The Barber then asks the boy to take him to see his old pupil as the film ends.

== Cast ==
- Tom Payne as Rob Cole/Jesse Ben Benjamin
- Emma Rigby as Rebecca
- Stellan Skarsgård as Barber
- Ben Kingsley as Ibn Sina
- Olivier Martinez as Shah Ala ad-Daula
- Michael Marcus as Mirdin
- Elyas M'Barek as Karim
- Fahri Yardım as Davout Hossein
- Makram Khoury as Imam
- Stanley Townsend as Bar Kappara
- Adam Thomas Wright as Young Rob Cole
- Peter Bankole as Mano Dayak
- Renu Setna as Quasim

== Release ==
The film premiered on 25 December 2013 in German theaters. It was an immediate box-office hit and earned the producers a Bogey Award for more than 1,000 visitors per copy on its opening weekend and 1 million visitors within ten days.

It was also released as an extended two-part mini-series for the German public TV ARD.

=== Critical reception ===
Critics for the movie were overall positive for its visuals and interesting subjects while it is criticized for its historical inaccuracies and simplistic romanticism. Peter Debruge praised the film for being "a hearty historical epic that pits intellectual progress against the stifling influence of world religions". Ben Kingsley's acting was deemed successful in portraying the Islamic scholar Avicenna. The visuals and the scene design of the movie were appreciated. Although the environment and costume design were approved, the historical inaccuracies were observed negatively. The movie is criticized for its "old fashioned story structure", "simplistic emotional ploys and reductive characterizations" and the script's inaccuracies; such as the altered timeline, the misdepiction of Islamic laws and organization, and the unrealistic comparison of Avicenna with his student (the protagonist).

== Sequel ==
A sequel, The Physician II, was announced in 2024 and released in 2025. Tom Payne reprises his role as Rob Cole, with the plot set after his return to London.
