= Jan Berger (screenwriter) =

German screenwriter

Jan Berger (born 1970 in Berlin) is a German screenwriter. He studied German studies and philosophy before he began to work as a screenwriter in 1997. In 2008 he received the Grimme-Preis for Offside.

== Filmography ==
- Apokalypso – Bombenstimmung in Berlin (1999) (TV Movie)
- Die Verwegene – Kämpfe um deinen Traum (2000) (TV Movie)
- Sumo Bruno (2000)
- Kebab Connection (2004)
- Boo, Zino & the Snurks (2004)
- Spielerfrauen (2005)
- FC Venus (2005)
- Offside (2005)
- FC Venus (2006)
- Die Tür (2009)
- We Are the Night (2010)
- The Physician (2013)
- The White Horse Inn (2013)
- Winnetou – Eine neue Welt (2016)
- Winnetou – Das Geheimnis vom Silbersee (2016)
- Winnetou – Der letzte Kampf (2016)
- Robbi, Tobbi und das Fliewatüüt (2016)
- Subs (2018)
