= Denis Moschitto =

German actor (born 1977)

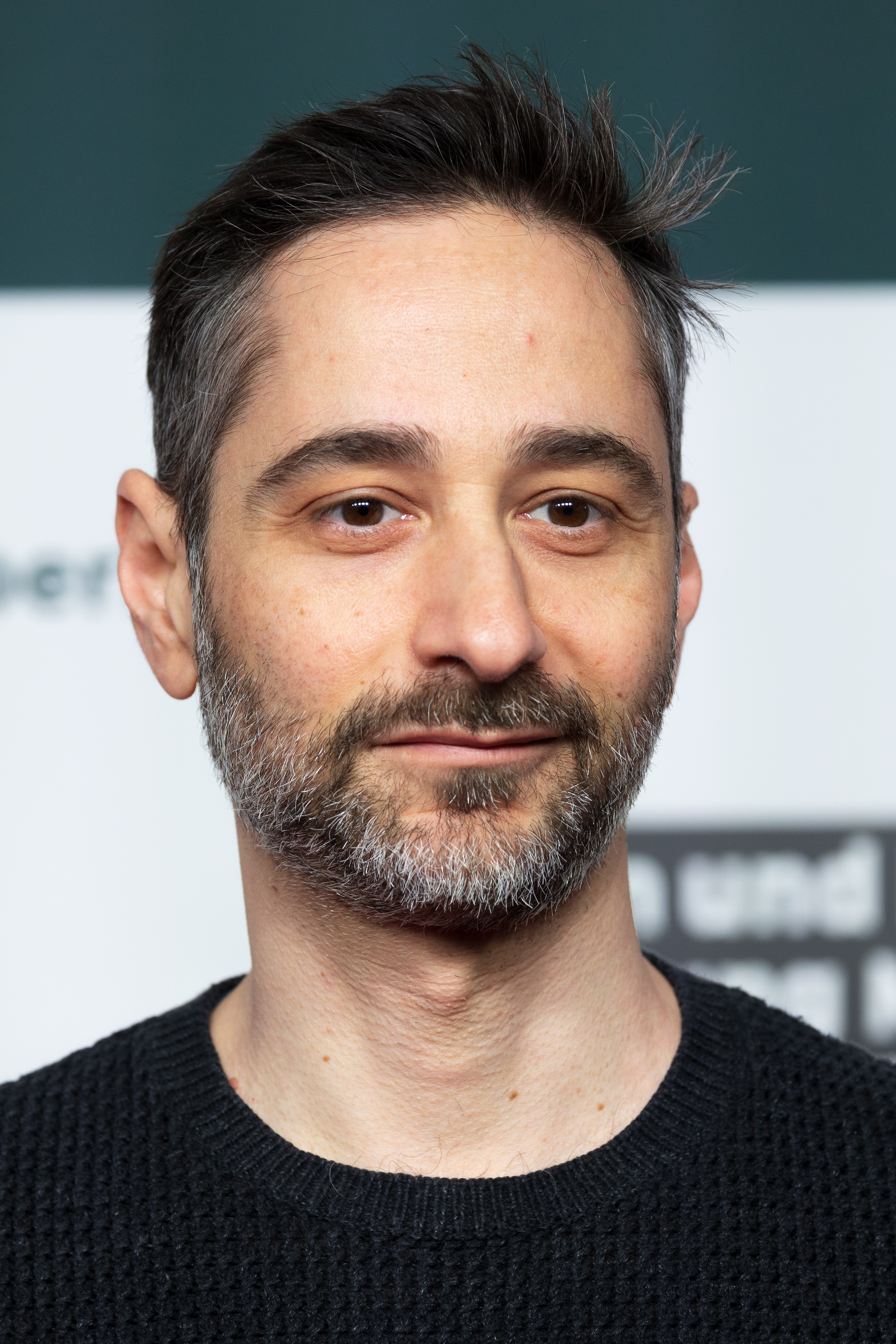
- Moschitto in 2023
- Born: 22 June 1977 (age 49); Cologne, West Germany
- Years active: 1999–present

Denis Moschitto (born 22 June 1977) is a German actor best known for his roles in Kebab Connection (2005), Chiko (2008) and In the Fade (2017).

== Early life ==
Moschitto was born in Cologne, West Germany, to an Italian father and a Turkish mother. In the early 1990s, he was active on the demoscene as a tracker musician under the moniker Merlin M.

== Career ==
Moschitto made his movie debut in 1999 in Rolf Schübel's Gloomy Sunday. In the following years, Moschitto was mainly seen in youth films and "coming of age" movies such as No More School (2000) or No Regrets (2001), where the son of an Italian father and a Turkish mother most often appeared as the cunning Italian or Turkish sidekick to the main protagonists.

Moschitto played his first leading role in the comedy Süperseks as a Hamburg-based Turk who sets up a phone sex hotline for fellow countrymen. Moschitto then played another leading role in a comedy as a wannabe star movie director in Anno Saul's film Kebab Connection. The drama Chiko, produced by Fatih Akin, features Moschitto as a small-time gangster from Hamburg who wants to get "to the top" by all means.

Besides his work as an actor, Moschitto is the co-author of the computer books Hackerland and Hackertales and a musician with the bands "Scoopex" and "Shining-8".

== Personal life ==
Moschitto is friends with actors Jessica Schwarz and Daniel Brühl. They shared an apartment in Cologne for a while. He is also a vegetarian since 2003.

== Filmography ==
- 1999: Gloomy Sunday
- 2000: No More School
- 2001: No Regrets
- 2003: Northern Star
- 2003: Die Klasse von '99
- 2003: Play It Loud!
- 2005: Süperseks
- 2005: Kebab Connection
- 2007: Meine böse Freundin
- 2008: Chiko
- 2008: 1½ Knights: In Search of the Ravishing Princess Herzelinde
- 2009: Tatort: Familienaufstellung
- 2009: Germany 09
- 2011: Woman in Love
- 2011: Almanya – Welcome to Germany
- 2013: Closed Circuit
- 2014: Coming In
- 2017: Wild Mouse
- 2017: In the Fade
- 2019: Bella Germania
- 2020: Dem Horizont so nah
- 2022: Over & Out
- 2022: Rheingold

== Awards ==
In 2003, Moschitto won the Günter-Strack-Fernsehpreis award as the Best Young Actor. In 2009, he was nominated for the German Film Award as Best Actor for his performance in Chiko
