= Lössl =

Lössl is a German-language surname. It may refer to:

- Claudia Lössl (born 1966), German actress
- Jonas Lössl (born 1989), Danish professional footballer
