= Yardım (surname) =

Yardım (IPA: [jɑɾˈd̪ɯm], literally "help, assistance, aid") is a Turkish surname and may refer to:

- Ahmet Cemil Yardım (1893–1966), Turkish politician
- Barbaros Yardım (born 1950), Turkish former footballer
- Fahri Yardım (born 1980), Turkish-German actor
- Mehmet Nuri Yardım (born 1960), Turkish journalist
- Ümit Yardım (born 1961), Turkish diplomat
