= Altes Geld =

Austrian dark comedy television series

- Genre: Dark comedy
- Created by: David Schalko
- Country of origin: Austria
- Original language: German
- No. of seasons: 1
- No. of episodes: 8

Production
- Running time: 60 minutes (including commercials)

Original release
- Network: ORF eins
- Release: 2015 – 2015

Altes Geld (German: Old Money) is an Austrian TV dark comedy series created by David Schalko, revolving around the dysfunctional and wealthy Viennese family.

== Plot ==
When Rolf Rauchensteiner, patriarch of a rich Viennese dynasty, discovers that he will die soon unless he receives a new liver, he decides that his inheritance will go to whoever finds him a new liver. This creates havoc in the dysfunctional family, as everyone scrambles to find a liver and the head doctor who could help him refuses to do so. There are also other issues, since his wife Liane is having affairs with both her stepson Zeno and the family doctor, his Jewish sister decides to sue for restitution and his daughter Jana is infatuated with his son Jakob. Over the course of the eight episodes, other storylines develop such as Jakob's girlfriend Kerstin being arrested for murder, Zeno gambling his wealth away and Rolf's assistant Brunner losing the trust of his wife Barbara.

== Main cast ==
- Udo Kier as Rolf Rauchensteiner, billionaire industrialist
- Sunnyi Melles as Liane Rauchensteiner, Rauchensteiner's second wife
- Nicholas Ofczarek as Zeno Rauchensteiner, Rauchensteiner's son from his first marriage
- Manuel Rubey as Jakob Rauchensteiner, Rolf and Liane Rauchensteiner's son
- Nora Waldstätten as Jana Rauchensteiner, Rolf and Liane Rauchensteiner's daughter
- Edita Malovčić as Tania, Zeno's girlfriend
- Thomas Stipsits as Herwig Brunner, Rolf Rauchensteiner's assistant
- Ursula Strauss as Barbara Brunner, Herwig Brunner's wife
- Robert Palfrader as Kralicek, Rolf Rauchensteiner's security
- Yohanna Schwertfeger as Kerstin Bachmann, Jakob Rauchensteiner's girlfriend
- Simon Schwarz as Tscheppe, Head of the organ distribution office, Green party politician
- Cornelius Obonya as Dr. Schober, Rauchensteiner family doctor
- Florian Teichtmeister as Martin, Jana Rauchensteiner's friend
- Johannes Krisch as the Commander
- Maria Hofstätter as the Commander's wife

== Background and production ==
Altes Geld was originally broadcast on Flimmit, ORF's online platform in early 2015, before being aired on ORF eins in Austria in November. Subsequently, it aired on RTL Crime in Germany in February 2016. It also screened at the International Film Festival Rotterdam in 2016.

The main role of Rolf Rauchensteiner was played by Udo Kier. It was originally supposed to be acted by Gert Voss, before his sudden death. Like Voss, most of the other actors were from the Burgtheater in Vienna.

== Episodes ==
Season 1
No. overall	Title	Original release date
1	"Buschtrommeln"	March 27, 2015
Rolf Rauchensteiner is the patriarch of a rich Viennese dynasty. When he discovers that he will die soon unless he receives a new liver, his wife is distraught and they decide to bring the family together for a conference.
2	"Alpha"	March 27, 2015
Rolf Rauchensteiner announces to the gathered family that whoever brings him a new liver will then receive his inheritance.
3	"Lederhaut"	March 27, 2015
The mayor is threatened with blackmail, Zeno's gambling lands him in hot water, Rauchsteiner's assistant Brunner is unable to hide his double life from his wife.
4	"Unter Löwen"	March 27, 2015
Rauchensteiner's sister decides to sue him, Zeno's gambling gets him into hotter water, and Jakob and Jana remake their acquaintance.
5	"Der Biber"	March 27, 2015
Rauchensteiner's condition becomes much worse, Zeno is kidnapped, Brunner speaks to his wife, Jakob discovers a potential liver donor.
6	"Der Mensch im Tier"	March 27, 2015
The search for a liver continues. Kerstin leaves jail then is arrested for murder. The Commander's wife urges him not to kill Zeno.
7	"Chloroform"	March 27, 2015
Zeno is lobotomized, Doctor Shober and his wife decide to blackmail the Rauchensteiners, Rolf Rauchensteiner receives a liver transplant.
8	"Schneeweisses Herz"	March 27, 2015
The series ends with Rolf Rauchensteiner alive and well after the transplant, as Jakob reluctantly steps into his shoes. Tina's attempt to marry Zeno is stymied, Jana has a miscarriage, Kerstin is still in jail.

== Reception ==
Screen Anarchy reviewed the series after it played at the International Film Festival Rotterdam, saying "Altes Geld is a caustic satire, a hilarious thriller, and a spectacularly sadistic soap all in one". The Guardian said "the deadpan style recalls the work of Yorgos Lanthimos". For Wunschliste the series was fascinating but the unlikeable characters made it hard to watch.

Altes Geld won a silver medal at the New York TV and Film Awards and a Gold Panda at the Sichuan Television Festival.
