= Reyhan Şahin =

German rapper

Lady Bitch Ray
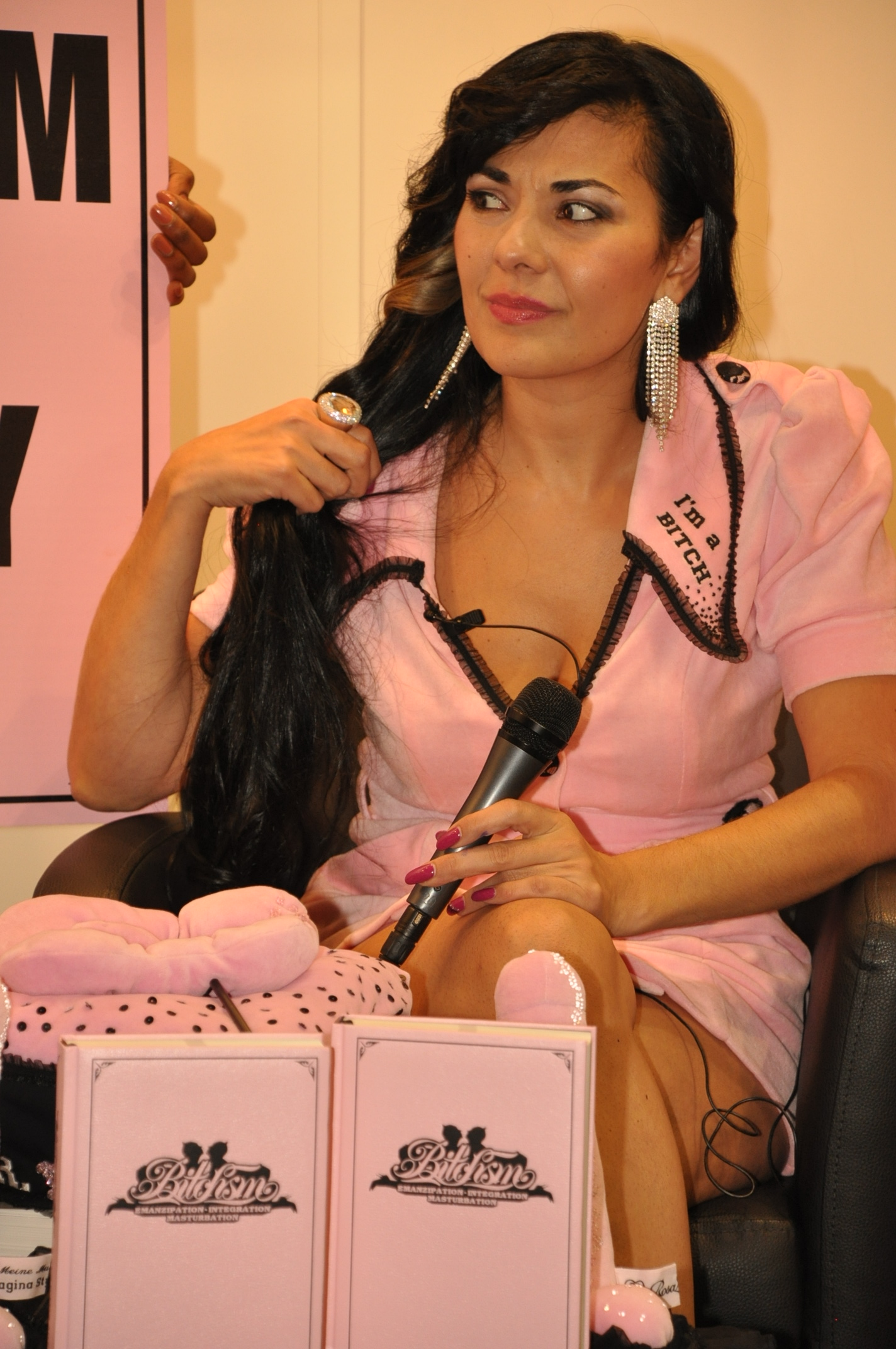
- Şahin in 2012

Background information
- Born: Reyhan Şahin; 1980 (age 45–46); Bremen, West Germany
- Genres: Hip-hop, dirty rap
- Occupations: Rapper, author, linguist
- Label: Vagina Style Records

Reyhan Şahin (born 1980), known professionally as Lady Bitch Ray or Doctor Bitch Ray, is a Turkish-German rapper, author, linguist and former radio host.

== Biography ==
Şahin was born in Bremen, West Germany. Her parents are Alevis and come from Sivas, Turkey. Before Reyhan was born, her parents immigrated to Germany and she grew up in the working-class neighborhood Gröpelingen in Bremen. Her father is a dede and worked as a welder in a local shipyard after his arrival in 1972. Şahin began rapping at the age of twelve. She completed high school with the Abitur (the high school diploma in Germany qualifying students for university).

=== Academic career ===
Şahin studied Linguistics and German Studies at the University of Bremen and graduated with a master's degree in linguistics in 2005. Her master's thesis on "Jugendsprache anhand der Darstellung der Jugendkultur Hip-Hop" (Youth Language based on the Representation of the Youth Culture of Hip-Hop) was published in an anthology edited by her department chair with Brockmeyer University Publishing.

She then completed her doctorate in 2012 with a dissertation on "Die Bedeutung des muslimischen Kopftuchs in Deutschland" (The Meaning of the Muslim Hijab in Germany). During this time, she taught the course "Introduction to Dress Semiotics" at the University of Bremen as an adjunct lecturer in the winter semester of 2007/08. For her dissertation she received a second prize in the subject group Humanities and Cultural Studies at the Deutschen Studienpreis (German Study Award) 2013. Her doctoral supervisor was Wolfgang Wildgen. Şahin was a member of the Research Center for Media and Communication starting in June 2012, and in this framework was a post-doctoral fellow of the University of Hamburg's Young Researchers Initiative through December 2013 In her new project she is researching the representation of Muslim women in the social networks.

=== Media career ===
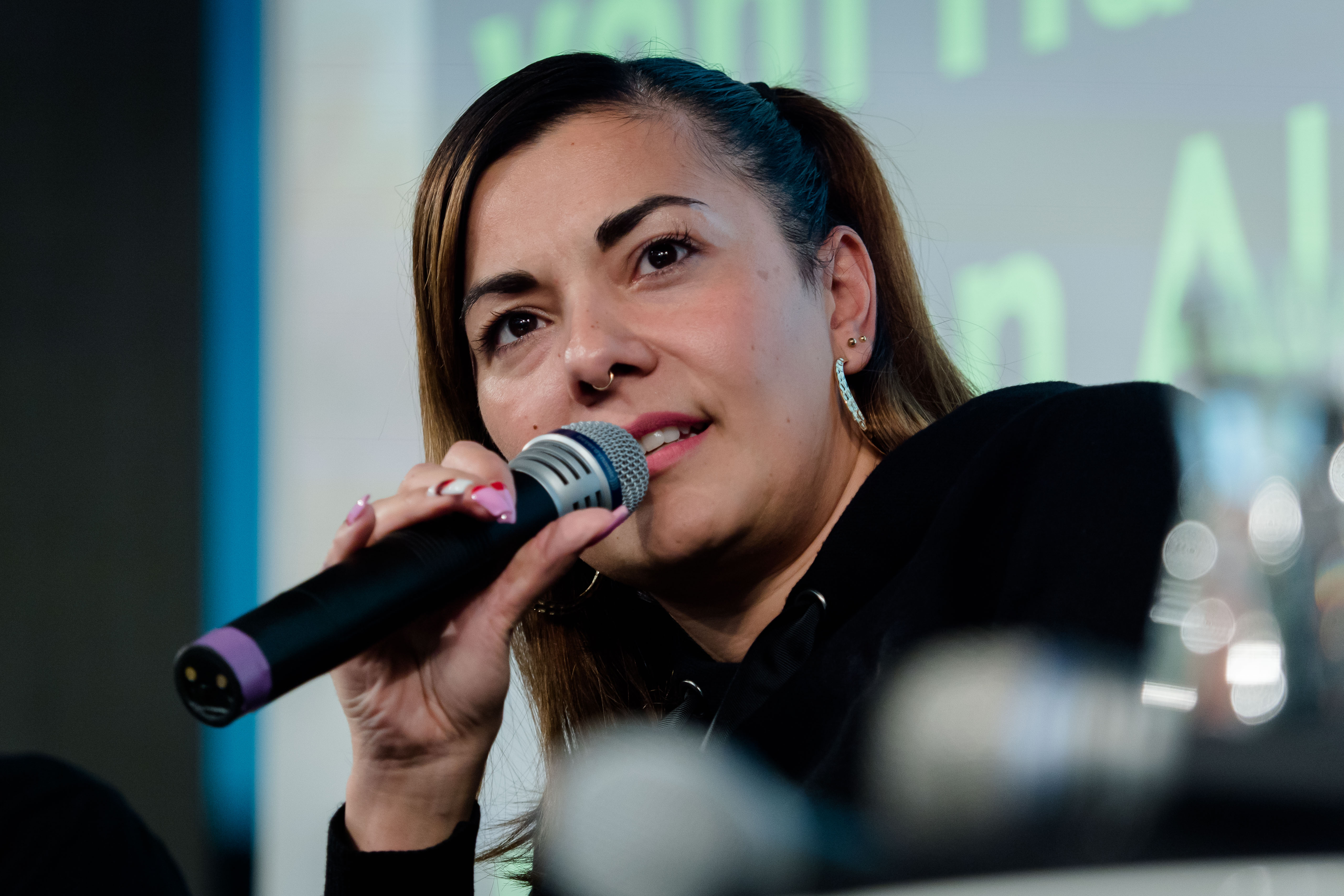
Şahin in 2018

Şahin worked for four years at the public radio program Funkhaus Europa as a freelancer and moderator. She was terminated in May 2006 by Radio Bremen which produces Funkhaus Europa together with WDR, because they believed her rap lyrics had "pornographic content." Şahin had posted a song entitled Hengzt Arzt Orgi, which is about a fictional sex orgy with the rappers King Orgasmus One, Bass Sultan Hengzt and Frauenarzt, on the internet for free. After the radio station found out about this, Şahin was given the choice of removing the song from the web or leaving the station. This fact was popularized by Bild, among others. In contrast, the New York Post and The Sun reported the collaboration was terminated because her style of dress was too skimpy. According to the Hindustan Times and Spiegel Online, Şahin fought the separation from Radio Bremen through legal means. In May 2008, the Bremen Regional Labor Court, presided over by Judge Waldemar Reinfelder, ruled in favor of Radio Bremen.

Subsequently, Şahin released the track Ich hasse dich (I hate you), in which she makes insulting remarks about pop stars Jeanette Biedermann, Sarah Connor and music producer Melbeatz. In her third rap release, Ich tret' dein Arsch, she insults the Berlin rapper Kool Savas. In the song, the rapper used the beat of Savas' single Komm mit mir (come with me), which had been already released. The hip-hop magazine Juice reported on Lady Bitch Ray in 2006 and she then released the song Deutsche Schwänze (German Dicks) on a Juice CD. Şahin initially marketed her products mainly online. In 2006, she hosted the pay-per-view talk show Große Fische, kleine Fische (Big Fish, Little Fish) in which she interviewed guests such as B-Tight, Henning Wehland and Jan Delay. On 8 March 2007 Lady Bitch Ray founded her own label, Vagina Style Records. The first releases, distributed exclusively on the internet, were the EP Vorhang auf on 30 March and the single Mein Weg (My Way) on 7 December 2007. Her website on Myspace got 3.7 million views by April 2010.

Şahin first became known to a broad German public in late 2007 through an appearance on Menschen bei Maischberger. As Lady Bitch Ray, Şahin was a guest on an edition of the Austrian late-night show Willkommen Österreich, which aired on January 10, 2008. There, she poured a glass of water over Ulf Poschardt, who had also been invited and had previously criticized her. Poschardt then left the show prematurely. At the time of the elections in Hessen, Şahin wrote an article for the Spiegel Online site on the controversy over juvenile delinquency that had been initiated by Prime Minister Roland Koch in January 2008. However, much of the text did not deal with youth violence, but with the controversy surrounding her person and dubbed Şahin's critics "garden Nazis."

Şahin made her debut as an actress in the 2008 German feature film Chiko, in which she plays a prostitute. The film premiered in the Panorama section at the 2008 Berlinale. On 24 April 2008 she promoted the film on the entertainment program Schmidt & Pocher. After the first broadcast of the edition, MDR and BR dropped the usual replays of the program. Spiegel Online suspected the reason for this cancellation was the artist's scandalous choice of language and subject matter: Şahin gave Pocher a can in the broadcast that allegedly contained her vaginal secretions. The broadcast then came under criticism and was ended after the end of the year. In June 2008 Şahin made a guest appearance in the 7th episode of MySpace's internet soap opera Candy Girls; with reference to the protection of minors, parts of Şahin's spoken contributions were initially faded out, and later the entire episode was taken off the air.

Her agency announced in May 2009 that Şahin would be taking a career break due to health problems. The reason for this was a breakdown at the university library in Bremen on 18 August 2008. In an interview with the daily newspaper Die Welt in September 2012, Şahin announced that she was suffering from severe depression.

Şahin took part in the show Hell's Kitchen in summer 2014 and won it. In 2015, she starred in Newtopia, a German reality TV show.

In 2019 her book Yalla, Feminism was published.

== Reception ==
Şahin is received differently in the mass media: the Turkish Daily News characterizes her as "controversial"; Bettina Lehnert said on Rundfunk Berlin-Branderburg online that she "provokes" with "pornographic" texts. Ursula Moreno suspects in the Spanish El Mundo that she has made a name for herself primarily through obscenities. According to the Süddeutsche Zeitung, guestbook entries on her website range from "You're a disgrace for every Turkish woman" to "She's full of power, sexy, I'm scared of her. Respect!!!""

The Bremen city magazine citybeat attests that she is a woman who "suffers from a penetrating urge to present herself and [...] desperately wants to make a career, no matter what the price." The Hamburger Abendblatt criticized her internet broadcast as "tasteless," and the taz objected that her "coarse, revealing appearance [...] hardly triggers discussions about integrations" but "rather about emancipation and taste." The online magazine Europolitan even denies her any feminine emancipation effect.

In mid-2008, Şahin's accusation that Charlotte Roche had plagiarized Şahin's literary style in her debut novella Feuchtgebiete was prominently discussed in the German print media.

About her taboo-violating lyrics, the rapper says she is concerned with Turkish-female emancipation; Şahin sees herself as the antithesis of male-chauvinist rappers like Sido or Bushido. She expressed her displeasure with how German-Turkish women are viewed in Germany in an interview with the taz. Sonja Pohlmann and Caroline Fetscher from the Tagesspiegel agree with her insofar as they see Lady Bitch Ray as a representative of the "alpha girls," a new generation of hedonistic feminists. Sociologist Paula-Irene Villa sees her as a "successful example of women's empowerment."

Şahin's appearance on Menschen bei Maischberger was met with a particularly broad media response. In the course of the broadcast, Şahin explained that she propagates the emancipation of women and a "vaginal self-determination" in her songs and sees her self-deprecating designation as a bitch as progress in terms of emancipation. Spiegel editor Christian Buß saw in her appearance a justification for Şahin's emancipatory criticism of her male rap colleagues. Peer Schader of the Frankfurter Allgemeine Zeitung, on the other hand, described Şahin in the arts section as a "poor provocative sausage in a golden glittery bowel" with "poisonous narrow-mindedness." The Tagesspiegel, which praised her music as "professional," noted that she was not concerned with demonstrating mechanisms of provocation and marketing – rather, she used them quite openly. They also said her strategy of attracting attention to herself therefore works. Markus Löning, a member of the Bundestag, stated that it was a "scandal" because of what he considered to be the low standard of the show.

Reviews of Şahin's musical works are rare. Alexander Rudolph complained in the Tages-Anzeiger that Şahin's academic career meant that her appearance as a gangsta rapper was inauthentic.

In 2008, rapper Schwartz released an album called Lady Bitch Gay, which contains several diss tracks against Şahin.

== Discography ==
- "Ich hasse dich" ("I hate you") (release date unknown)
- "Du bist krank" ("You're sick") (unknown)
- "Suck It" (unknown)

At this time released EPs

- "Fick mich EP" ("Fuck me EP") (2006)
- "Vorhang auf!" ("Curtains open!") (30 March 2007)
- "Mein Weg" ("My way") (6 December 2007)

== Literature ==
- Şahin, Reyhan (2006): "Jugendsprache im Hip Hop", in Possession, Quantitative Typologie und Semiotik: Georgisch, Irisch, Türkisch, edited by Thomas Stolz, Bochum: Brockmeyer. ISBN 3-8196-0674-2
