= Kebab Connection =

- Directed by: Anno Saul
- Written by: Ralph Schwingel; Fatih Akın; Ruth Toma; Jan Berger; Anno Saul
- Produced by: Stefan Schubert
- Starring: Denis Moschitto; Nora Tschirner
- Distributed by: Universum Film
- Release dates: October 2004 (Hof International Film Festival); 21 April 2005 (Germany)
- Running time: 96 minutes
- Country: Germany
- Languages: German; Turkish; Greek
- Budget: 2 400 000 €

Kebab Connection is a 2004 German-Turkish comedy film with some slapstick that is set in Hamburg and directed by Anno Saul.

== Plot ==
Ibo (Denis Moschitto) is a young Turkish-German man who is an aspiring filmmaker. A clash of cultures and pre-parental anxiety ensues after Ibo's German girlfriend, Titzi (Nora Tschirner), announces that she's pregnant. Ibo's father (Güven Kıraç) is upset at his son for wanting to start a family with a non-Turkish German woman while Titzi is upset at Ibo over his hesitance in taking on fatherly responsibilities. Other themes are the competition of a Turkish kebab restaurant and a Greek taverna, a gang trying to extort the owner of the kebab restaurant, Ibo's quest to make the first German Kung-Fu movie and the pursuit of both Titzi and her roommate at a prestigious drama academy.

== Cast ==
- Denis Moschitto - Ibo
- Nora Tschirner - Titzi
- Güven Kıraç - Ibo's father
- Hasan Ali Mete - Onkel Ahmet
- Adnan Maral - Kirianis
- Fahri Yardım - Lefty
- Adam Bousdoukos - Valid
- Cem Akın - Altan
- Nursel Köse - Hatice
- Tatjana Velimirov - Stella
- Romina Fütterer - Ayla
- Sibel Kekilli - Italian woman
- Kida Khodr Ramadan - Özgür

== See also ==
- Yasemin
- Terrorism and Kebab
