= Michael Marcus (actor) =

English actor

- Born: Michael Marcus Morgan
- Occupation: Actor
- Years active: 2007–present

Michael Marcus Morgan, better known as Michael Marcus, is an English actor. He is best known for his portrayal of Henry Tudor in the TV series The White Queen (2013). He also had supporting roles in The Physician (2013) and The Theory of Everything (2014).

== Career ==
In 2011 Marcus appeared in two episodes of the third season of Misfits as Peter, an avid comic book reader with the power of Future Illustration. He later appeared in the ten-part BBC One historical drama The White Queen, the 2013 adaptation of Philippa Gregory's novels in The Cousins' War series. Marcus played the role of Henry Tudor, the Lancastrian claimant to the throne who later started the line of Tudor monarchs.

In early April 2014 it was announced that Marcus would play the lead role of Valentine in the Royal Shakespeare Company's production of The Two Gentlemen of Verona. Marcus described his character as a man "who sort of seems to be running away from something rather than going towards something. But I think [he] tries to convince himself that actually what he wants is out there in Milan and not at home".

== Filmography ==
=== Film ===
Year	Title	Role
2013	The Invisible Woman	Charley Dickens
2013	The Physician	Mirdin
2014	The Theory of Everything	Ellis

=== Television ===
Year	Title	Role	Notes
2007	Nearly Famous	Pete	1 episode
2007 - 2008	Casualty	Mike Prickard / Drew Meadway	"Reality Bites" (as Mike) "No Return" (as Drew)
2011	Misfits	Peter	2 episodes
2013	The White Queen	Henry Tudor	3 episodes
2013	Ripper Street	Sebastian Ferranti	1 episode
2013	Lucan	James Fox	TV movie (2 parts)
2016	Siblings	Sebastian	1 episode
2019-2022	War of the Worlds	Dan Ward	seasons 1 & 3

=== Theater ===
Year	Title	Role	Notes
2014	The Two Gentlemen of Verona	Valentine	Royal Shakespeare Company
