= Boo, Zino & the Snurks =

Boo, Zino & The Snurks
- German theatrical release poster
- Directed by: Lenard Fritz Krawinkel; Holger Tappe
- Written by: Jan Berger; Donald McEnery; Bob Shaw
- Produced by: Lenard Fritz Krawinkel; Holger Tappe
- Edited by: Alexander Soskin; Fabian Mueller
- Music by: Michael Kamen
- Production companies: Ambient Entertainment; Recorded Picture Company; Morena Films
- Distributed by: Warner Bros. Pictures (Germany); Entertainment Film Distributors (United Kingdom); Barton Films (Spain)
- Release dates: 18 March 2004 (Germany); 15 October 2004 (United Kingdom); 29 November 2006 (Spain)
- Running time: 91 minutes
- Countries: Germany; United Kingdom; Spain
- Languages: German; English
- Budget: $25 million
- Box office: $2.8 million

Boo, Zino & The Snurks (also known as Back to Gaya and The Snurks) is a 2004 animated fantasy film directed by Lenard Fritz Krawinkel and Holger Tappe. It is the first CGI-animated film to be produced in Germany.

== Plot ==
The film opens with a narrator's voice describing a beautiful world of Gaya, which takes place in a TV show called The Adventures of Boo & Zino, where the inhabitants called Zeldons, a community of small, big-eared humanoids live in. In their world, the land's energy, light, and life source is entirely sustained by a magical crystal orb known as the Dalamite.

Boo, a brilliant, intelligent yet easily frightened inventor and his best friend Zino, a brave but slightly arrogant local hero, frequently clash with the Snurks (Galger, Zek, and Bramph), a trio of goblin-like humanoid creatures who envy Boo and Zino's fame. After a chaotic race, which the Mayor's rebellious daughter, a princess named Atlanta was involved in, had been won by Zino, disaster strikes.

In the real world, a mad, creepy scientist Professor N. Icely, furious by the show for getting his former science show canceled due to low audience ratings, seeks venegance by using his reality-bending machine to steal the Dalamite from the world of Gaya for himself. Knowing that their world would be doomed without it, the Snurks attempts to take advantage of stealing the Dalamite for a chance to become heroes ends up leaping into the closing energy vortex along with it, before Boo, Zino, and Atlanta ends up leaping into it as well to save their homeland.

Upon arrival, the heroes find themselves stranded in the real world, where they navigate the dangers of the human city due to their small size, dealing with sewer rats and ordinary human obstacles.

After banding back together as a group, they find and break into a TV store, where they see the news on one of the screens showing their animation creator, Albert Drollinger, being interviewed. To seek answers for their appearance on Earth, they eventually seek out to him inside of his own mansion to ask for help. Though Drollinger is initially terrified at first by the characters, he immediately calms down after the group asks for answers about how they got to the human world. As Drollinger shared his wisdom, the group learns for the first time ever in their lives, they possess free will and are no longer bounded by script, meaning they have the freedom to do as they wish without any intervention.

Unfortunately, Icely, who has been seeking out cordinates of the characters' and the Dalamite's whereabouts, intervenes their conversation, steals the Dalamite, and tazing Drollinger, Atlanta, and the Snurks before kidnapping them, leaving Boo and Zino free to finish the mission.

At the abandoned laboratory, Drollinger, tied up and seated, regains consciousness. Icely expresses to Drollinger about his science show being canceled, and was tossed out to the street due to low audience ratings, blaming his show of Boo & Zino for its success and the viewers, claiming the show more entertaining. To enact his revenge, he intends to use the raw power of the Dalamite to fuel a weapon that would flood the world with molten lava through home television sets. Boo and Zino infiltrate the lab and overcomes Icely's massive robot guardian, and free their friends. Working together with the Snurks and Atlanta, Boo eventually gets the courage and manages to turn Icely's reality-bending machine against him, sending him to the world where a volcanic eruption occurred.

The device reverses the portal, sending the characters back into the television realm, where Gaya would be restored while Boo, who at first, bid farewell to Zino, stays behind. Zino attempts to use a mutli-functional slingshot (which Boo invented) to catch the calamite but misses. Boo is about to free the Dalamite but a freak accident happens. But when Drollinger encourages Boo to catch the Dalamite and says "Go for it," Boo ends up in the vortex with the Dalamite in his hands, and enters back to Gaya with everyone else.

Back in Gaya, the land is restored back to its rightful place, saving their civilization. The Mayor is happy to see his daughter Atlanta again, and Zino, having Gaya saved. But when he tells Atlanta she must "kiss the hero," she kisses Zek (who had a crush on Atlanta throughout the film), much to the Zeldons dismay. Disgusted, the Mayor orders the guards to have Zek arrested, but Atlanta, with the rest of the Snurks, Boo, and Zino at her aid, stands up to her father, telling him Zek is a hero and risked his life to save Gaya. As Boo also stands up to the Mayor saying if Zek gets arrested, then all of them should be, too. Then the Mayor, realizing their motives, grants them all medals.

The Zeldons and Snurks celebrate the freedom of Gaya.

In the mid-credits scene, Galger uses a cellphone to call Drollinger (who struggled to come up with new ideas), and gives him new story ideas and suggestions for future episodes of The Adventures of Boo & Zino, much to Drollinger's delight.

== Voice cast ==
=== German ===
- Michael Herbig as Boo
- Vanessa Petruo as Alanta
- Sebastian Höffner as Zeck
- Torsten Münchow as Zino
- Wolfgang Völz as Mayor
- Claudia Lössl as E.N.I.A.C.

=== English ===
- Alan Marriott as Boo
- Emily Watson as Alanta
- Glenn Wrage as Zino
- John Schwab as Zeck
- Patrick Stewart as Albert Drollinger
- Bob Saker as Mayor Guyban
- Stephan Lander as Dr. N. Icely
- John Guerrasio as Galger
- Redd Pepper as Bramph
- Dan Russell as Chad, Fred
- Kate Robbins as Valerie. Female Gayan
- Lorelei King as Female Gayan

== Production ==
The film was animated in Alias Autodesk Maya 4
