= Chiko =

- DVD Cover
- Directed by: Özgür Yıldırım
- Written by: Özgür Yıldırım
- Produced by: Fatih Akın; Klaus Maeck
- Starring: Denis Moschitto; Moritz Bleibtreu; Volkan Özcan; Fahri Ogün Yardım; Reyhan Şahin; Lilay Huser; Philipp Baltus; Henny Reents; Hans Löw; Simon Goerts
- Cinematography: Matthias Bolliger
- Edited by: Bouke Schottert
- Production companies: Corazón International; Norddeutscher Rundfunk
- Distributed by: Mongrel Media; Alfa Dilms; Falcom Media
- Release date: 17 April 2008; (Berlinale)
- Running time: 92 minutes
- Country: Germany
- Languages: German; Turkish
- Budget: €1.5 million

Chiko is a German 2008 film written and directed by Özgür Yıldırım.

== Plot ==
Issa, also known as Chiko, is a Turkish immigrant man living in Hamburg with best friend Tibet, strongly aspires to achieve wealth and respect by any means. Meeting Brownie, a music producer and drug dealer, then tasks Chiko and Tibet with selling several kilograms of marijuana for him. However, when Brownie discovers that Tibet has been skimming profits, hammers a nail into Tibet's foot as punishment. Chiko then decides to avenge Tibet by shooting Brownie but he is unable to carry out the attempt at the opportunity, instead hiding the gun and accepting an offer from Brownie for a lucrative cocaine deal. Tibet desiring revenge, lies to mutual friend Curly to get him drive him to Brownie, but when following Brownie, they instead drive away when Chiko turns up and recognizes them. Chiko and Tibet then argue with Tibet inadvertently shooting Curly injured, with a hubristic Chiko embarking on a extravagance spree, leasing an upscale apartment, a sports vehicle and opening an eponymous restaurant. At Chiko's request, Brownie even fires the prostitute Meryem from his service who Chiko has fallen in love with and then letting her move into the apartment with him.

Tibet, no longer on speaking terms with Chiko and still living with his mother, has renal disease, dependent on regular dialysis and is sinking deeper into addiction. Seeking revenge on Brownie, he then lies in wait at his recording studio and opens fire at him missing him. Brownie demands that Chiko execute Tibet but he pretends to do so and instead hides Tibet in a mosque with a permitting imam. Brownie, learning that Tibet is still alive, sends his thugs to Tibet's mother to find out where he is, only to then fatally beat her. Informing Tibet of his mother's death, Chiko then drives to Brownie and executes him in front of his wife and child. Initially considering escaping alone, Chiko then decides to go over to Tibet to convince him to go with him. But before Chiko can persuade his grief-stricken friend, takes revenge by fatally stabbing Chiko hugging him.

== Awards ==
- Özgur Yıldırım won a Best Screenplay award, Sebastian Thümler won a Best Editing award. In addition, Denis Moschitto was nominated for Best Actor award, and the film was nominated for Best Feature award.
- Matthias Bolliger was nominated for the 2008 German Camera Award in the feature film category of the 2009 German Film Awards.
- Özgür Yıldırım won an award in the category Best Screenplay of the 2008 Nordic Film Days Lübeck 2008.
- Denis Moschitto won an award for Best Actor, and Volkan Özcan won the “Special Jury Prize” for Best Newcomer of the 2008 Turkish Film Festival of Germany.
- The film won the Young Lion award of the 2008 Hachenburger Film Festival.

== Cast ==
- Denis Moschitto as Chiko
- Moritz Bleibtreu as Brownie
- Volkan Özcan as Tibet
- Fahri Ogün Yardım as Curly
- Reyhan Şahin as Meryem
- Lilay Huser as Tibets Mutter
- Philipp Baltus as Scholle
- Henny Reents as Reji
- Hans Löw as Sascha
- Simon Goerts as Jimmi

== Production ==
Filming took place in Hamburg and Hannover.

== Reception ==
=== Critical response ===
According to critic aggregation review site Rotten Tomatoes, it has a film score of 63% based on 19 reviews. According to Pamela Jahn of Electric Sheep; "... its uneven blend of social criticism, domestic drama and gangster tragedy illustrates just how difficult it is to capture that distinctive Scarface quality."
