= Winnetou (2016 film) =

2016 German television film

- Based on: Winnetou series by Karl May
- Screenplay by: Jan Berger; Alexander M. Rümelin
- Directed by: Philipp Stölzl
- Starring: Nik Xhelilaj; Wotan Wilke Möhring
- Composer: Heiko Maile
- Country of origin: Germany
- Original language: German

Production
- Editor: Sven Budelmann

Original release
- Network: RTL
- Release: December 2016

Winnetou (full German title: Winnetou – Der Mythos lebt) is a German television miniseries directed by Philipp Stölzl and starring Nik Xhelilaj and Wotan Wilke Möhring. It is based on three adventure novels by Karl May. It has been broadcast in three parts on RTL in late December 2016.

== Cast ==
- Nik Xhelilaj as Winnetou
- Wotan Wilke Möhring as Old Shatterhand
- Mario Adorf as Santer Sr.
- Michael Maertens as Santer Jr.
- Jürgen Vogel as Rattler
- Iazua Larios as Nscho Tschi
- Katarina Strahinic as Ochina
- Milan Peschel as Sam Hawkens
- Jani Zombori Banovac Apachie kringer
- Valim Kleber as Häuptling der Hoppa
