= Fabian Hinrichs =

German actor

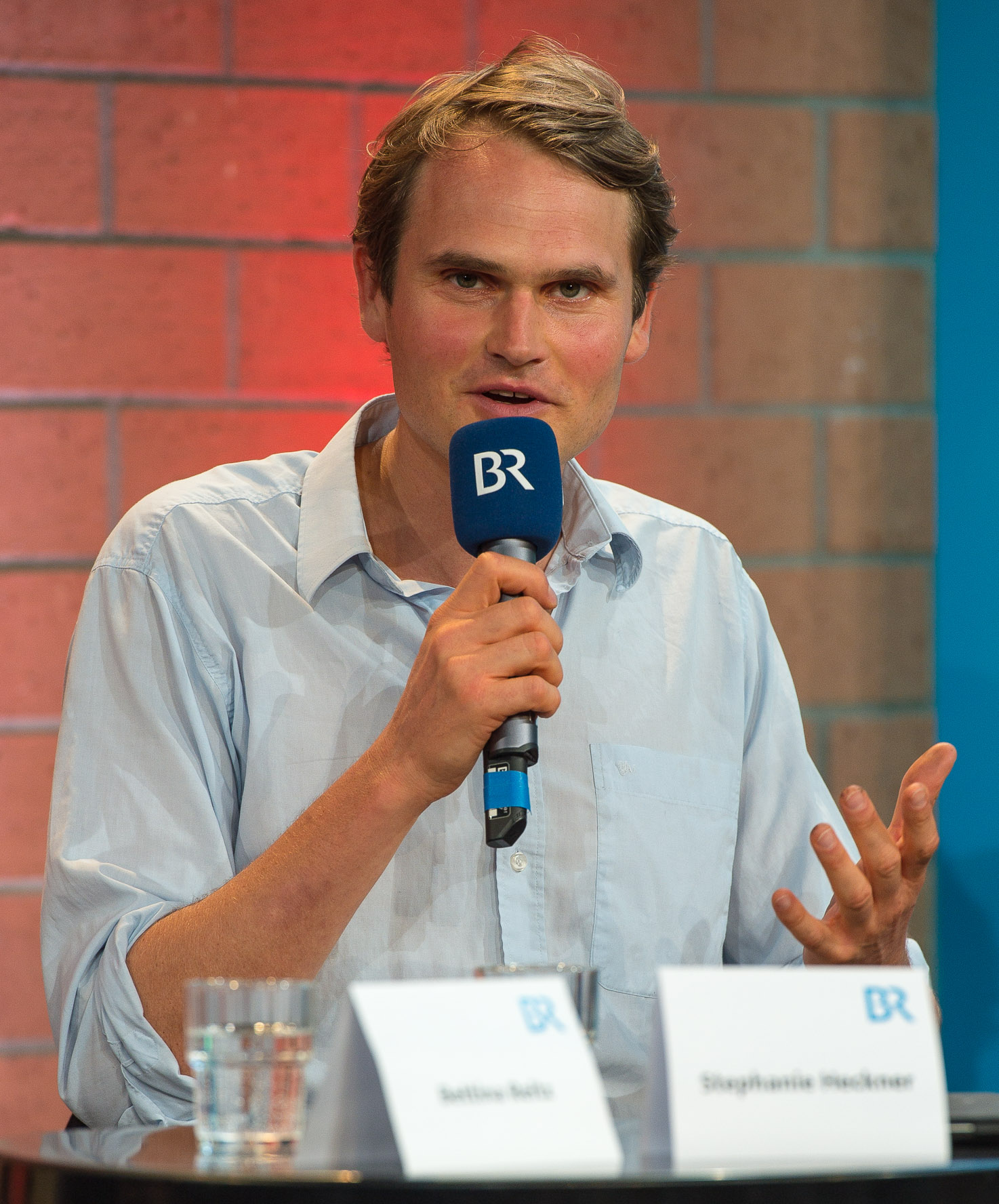
- Born: Fabian Hinrichs; 1974 (age 51–52); Hamburg, West Germany
- Occupation: Actor
- Years active: 2003–present

Fabian Hinrichs (born 1974) is a German actor. He is probably best known for his performance as Hans Scholl in Sophie Scholl – The Final Days, which was nominated for Academy Award for Best Foreign Language Film.

Hinrichs has also been a member of the German Film Academy and the European Film Academy. From 2000 to 2006, he was a member of the Volksbühne Berlin ensemble.

== Filmography ==
Title	Year	Role	Notes
Gun-Shy	2003	Lukas Eiserbek	Schussangst
Großstadtrevier	2004	Paul	(TV Series; 1 episode)
Blackout	2005	Tom Schulze	(Short Film)
Sophie Scholl – The Final Days	2005	Hans Scholl	Sophie Scholl – Die letzten Tage; New Faces Award for Best Actor
The Wedding Party	2005	Alexander Halberstadt	Die Bluthochzeit
Neandertal	2006	Richard	
Bella Block	2006	Malte Preis	(TV Series; 1 episode)
The Criminalist	2006	Marc Bucholz	(TV Series; 1 episode) Der Kriminalist
Bloch	2007	Michael Liebknecht	(TV Series; 1 episode)
Sooner or Later	2007	Daniel	Früher oder später
Der Dicke	2007	Markus Levian	(TV Series; 1 episode) Der Dicke
Jenny Berlin	2008	Olli Blank	(TV Series; 1 episode) Einsatz in Hamburg
The Best Is Yet to Come	2008	Tom Mailinger	(TV Film) Das Beste kommt erst
Love and Other Hazards	2009	Henning Linker	(TV Film) Liebe und andere Gefahren
Dutschke	2009	Peter Schneider	(TV Film)
Tatort	2009	Dr. Wolf / Thies Nowak	(TV Series; 2 episodes); Nominated—German Television Award for Best Supporting Actor
Gravity	2009	Frederick Feinermann	Schwerkraft; Max Ophüls Film Festival Special Prize for Best Actor; Nominated—German Film Award for Best Actor
66/67: Fairplay Is Over	2009	Florian	66/67 – Fairplay war gestern
My Land	2010	Sommer	(TV Film) Mein Land
Countdown – The Hunt Begins	2010	Jürgen Stolz	(TV Series; 1 episode) Countdown – Die Jagd beginnt
Hochzeitspolka	2010	Jonas	
Leipzig Homicide	2010	Daniel Jaboweit	(TV Series; 1 episode)
The Daredevil	2010	Christoph Weber	(TV Film) Die Draufgänger
Fatal News	2015	Olaf Nissen	(TV Film) Der Fall Barschel
Wackersdorf	2018	Karlheinz Billinger	(Film)

== Awards and nominations ==
Award	Year	Category	Nominated work	Result
New Faces Award	2005	Best Actor	Sophie Scholl – The Final Days	Won
German Television Awards	2009	Best Supporting Actor	Crime Scene	Nominated
Max Ophüls Film Festival	2009	Special Prize for Best Actor	Gravity	Won
German Film Awards	2010	Best Actor	Gravity	Nominated
Theatre Today Awards	2010	Actor of the Year	I Look Into Your Eyes, Societal Context of Delusion!	Won
