= Gravity (2009 film) =

2009 film by Maximilian Erlenwein

- Directed by: Maximilian Erlenwein
- Starring: Fabian Hinrichs; Jürgen Vogel
- Release date: August 2009
- Running time: 1h 37min
- Country: Germany
- Language: German

Gravity (German: Schwerkraft) is a 2009 German crime film directed by Maximilian Erlenwein.

It was awarded the Max Ophüls Prize in 2010.

== Plot ==
The adapted bank employee Frederik Feinermann is torn from his orderly life when a bank customer shoots himself before his eyes. Instead of going on with his life, as suggested by his emotionally cold boss, as if nothing had happened, he breaks into this one. To get his credit card back, which was lost in the apartment, he seeks the help of an old friend, the former prisoner Vince Holland.

From the initially one-off campaign, a series of burglaries develops, in which the two rob customers of Frederik's Bank at night. He gets deeper and deeper into crime, in which he can live out his dark side, while Vince actually wanted to end his criminal career.

At the same time, Frederik finally finds the courage to approach his childhood sweetheart Nadine, who ended their relationship seven years ago, apparently by chance, because he has never overcome his love for her.

Vince is meanwhile haunted by Reinier Grimm, a man from his earlier criminal days, who threatens him. Frederik has finally won back his childhood love and wants to live out their childhood dream, a trip to Iceland, with her. Before he sets off on the trip, however, he wants to prevent Vince from finally solving his problems with Grimm. However, Frederik cannot stop Vince who shoots Reinier Grimm after a fight on his estate.

Back at the train station, Frederik is finally overwhelmed by the police. Mrs. Reicherts, one of Frederik's colleagues, had betrayed him. The film ends with Frederik, in handcuffs, and Nadine smiling at each other at the train station.

== Cast ==
- Fabian Hinrichs - Frederick Feinermann
- Jürgen Vogel - Vince
- Nora Waldstätten - Nadine
- Jule Böwe - Sonja
- Jeroen Willems - Reinier Grimm
- Thorsten Merten - Kollath
- Eleonore Weisgerber - Frau Reicherts
- Judith Engel - Frau Schneider
- Henning Peker - Herr Schneider
- Fahri Yardım - Chef im Lager
