= Nora Waldstätten =

Austrian actress (born 1981)

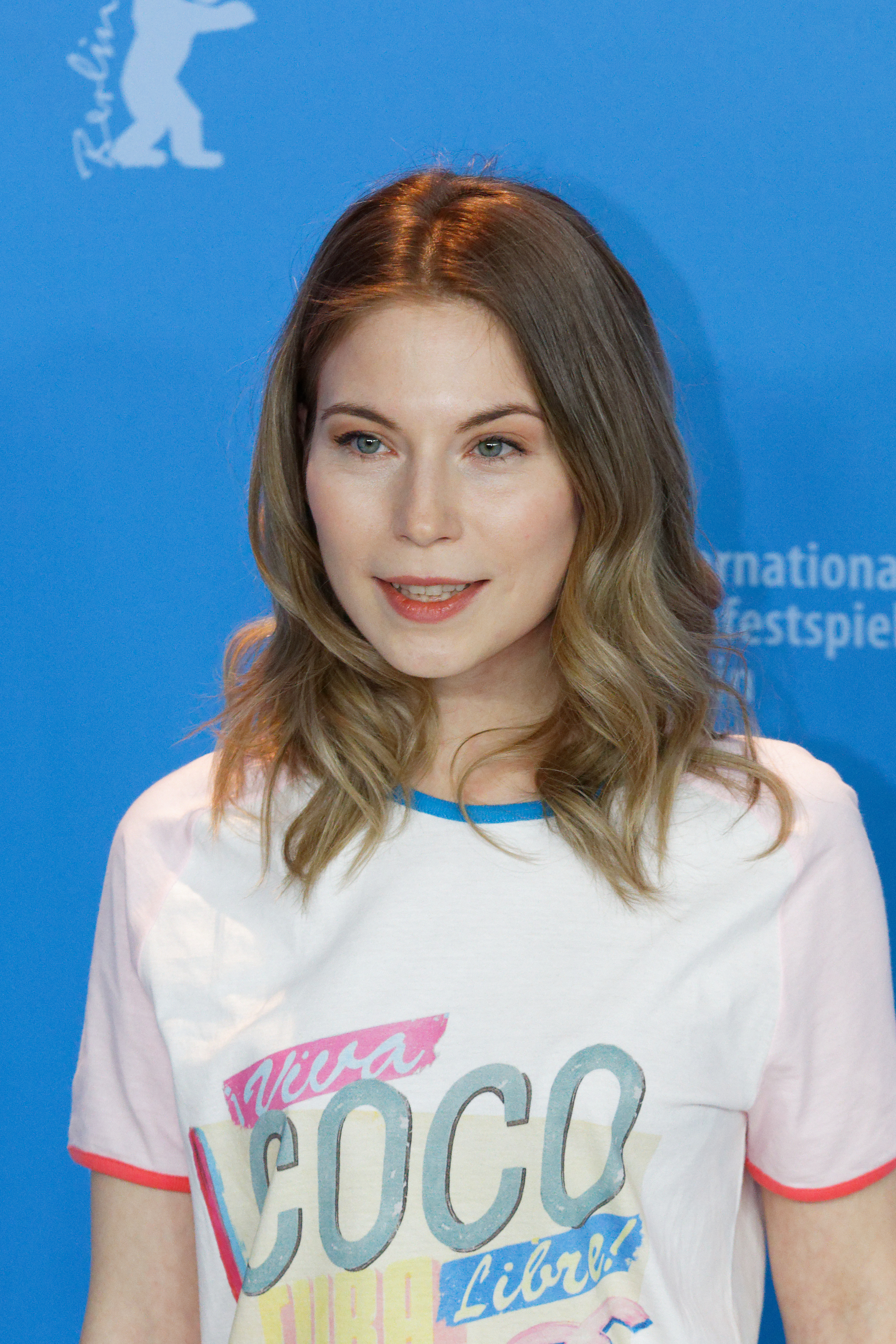
- Waldstätten in 2017
- Born: Nora Marie Theres Beatrice Elisabeth von Waldstätten; 1 December 1981 (age 44); Vienna, Austria
- Other name: Nora von Waldstätten
- Occupation: Actress
- Years active: 2004–present

Nora Marie-Theres Beatrice Elisabeth Waldstätten (Note: Note, there is no substantiation in current sourcing for the hyphenation in "Marie-Theres".) (Note: This full name, preceded by "Baronesse" and sans the hyphen, appears in a personal disclosure to an English news publication, the Daily Express, as quoted in the Rheinische Post.) (Note: Note, a titular reference to "Baroness" and the presented name, "Nora Marie Theres von Waldstätten", appears in the Antje Wewer (31 October 2010) citation, an interview in Süddeutsche Zeitung.) (born 1 December 1981) is an Austrian actress, also formerly known in German productions as Nora von Waldstätten.

== Early life and education ==
Born Nora Marie Theres Beatrice Elisabeth von Waldstätten in Vienna, Austria, on 1 December 1981, Nora Waldstätten was raised in Baden bei Wien, Austria, the third of four children in a family descended from old Austrian nobility. That ancestry included an "Ur-Ur-Ur-Großmutter, die Baronin von Waldstätten" (a baroness and great-great-great-grandmother), a purported patron of Mozart, and a great-grandfather, Egon Freiherr von Waldstätten, an Austrian military general, Court and State Councillor, and scholarly military writer with a decorated career as an officer (e.g., in World War I). (Note: As source of these details, see Egon von Waldstätten.) (Note: The only current source of this career information for Egon Freiherr von Waldstätten is the German Wikipedia, from which no verifiable sources are available for transfer in, in support of the appearing description. (Their lack of utility of these dated German-language sources, as verifiable here, lies in their incompleteness—lack of volume numbers, page numbers, digital locations, etc.))

As a child, Waldstätten attended the Akademietheater and the Burgtheater, the latter becoming like a second home ("wurde fast ihr zweites Zuhause"); after an unsuccessful period taking aim at being a prima ballerina, she became active at the Stadttheater (Stadttheater Baden), where she had her first speaking role.

Waldstätten left Austria for Berlin, Germany at 19, and in the early 2000s relocated to Prenzlauer Berg, and began to study acting at Berlin University of the Arts soon after, a course of study that she pursued from 2003-2007. She brought with her into her studies a measure of shyness, insecurity, and fear, the latter of which she is described as having learned to overcome through her acting studies. Writing for Der Tagesspiegel in April 2017, Katja Hübner states that, "die Schauspielschule bot ihr einen Schutzraum, in dem sie sich ausprobieren konnte [drama school offered her a safe space, in which she could experiment]". In that period, she is described as having practiced monologues alongside fellow actress Jutta Lampe, and having sung musical pieces of Bertolt Brecht and Billy Joel.

== Career ==
=== Film and television work ===
While in her first year of her acting studies, she took on her first commercial film role.

In 2004 and 2005, Waldstätten had small roles, credited as von Waldstätten, in Constantin von Jascheroff's Jargo, and Christoph Hochhäusler's Falsche Bekenner. In 2008, she co-starred alongside Sabrina Ouazani in Irene von Alberti's German-Moroccan film, Tangerine. As described by Antje Wewer of the Süddeutsche Zeitung, she first became more widely known through her role as a student murderer in the episode "Herz aus Eis" [Heart of Ice] (2009), in the series, Tatort, a police procedural. She received the New Faces Award in 2009 for her performance in that series. In addition, she acted in the film Schwerkraft (Gravity, 2009), for which she was honored with the Max Ophüls Prize for best female newcomer, at the 31st Max Ophüls Film Festival (January 2010).

In a drama with international casting, Waldstätten appeared as the role of Magdalena Kopp in Olivier Assayas' 2010 miniseries, Carlos, about the convicted Venezuelan murderer and terrorist, "Carlos the Jackal"; the role was honored at the 2010 Cannes Film Festival, and was awarded a Golden Globe in 2011. In 2011 she appeared in a short film as a testimonial for the Austrian beverage bottler Vöslauer.

In 2012, she starred in the international TV adaptation of Ken Follett's novel World Without End, and in 2015 in the Austrian TV series Altes Geld. In 2016, she starred in Olivier Assayas' 2016 work, Personal Shopper with Kristen Stewart and Lars Eidinger, which won Best Director award for Assayas at Cannes.

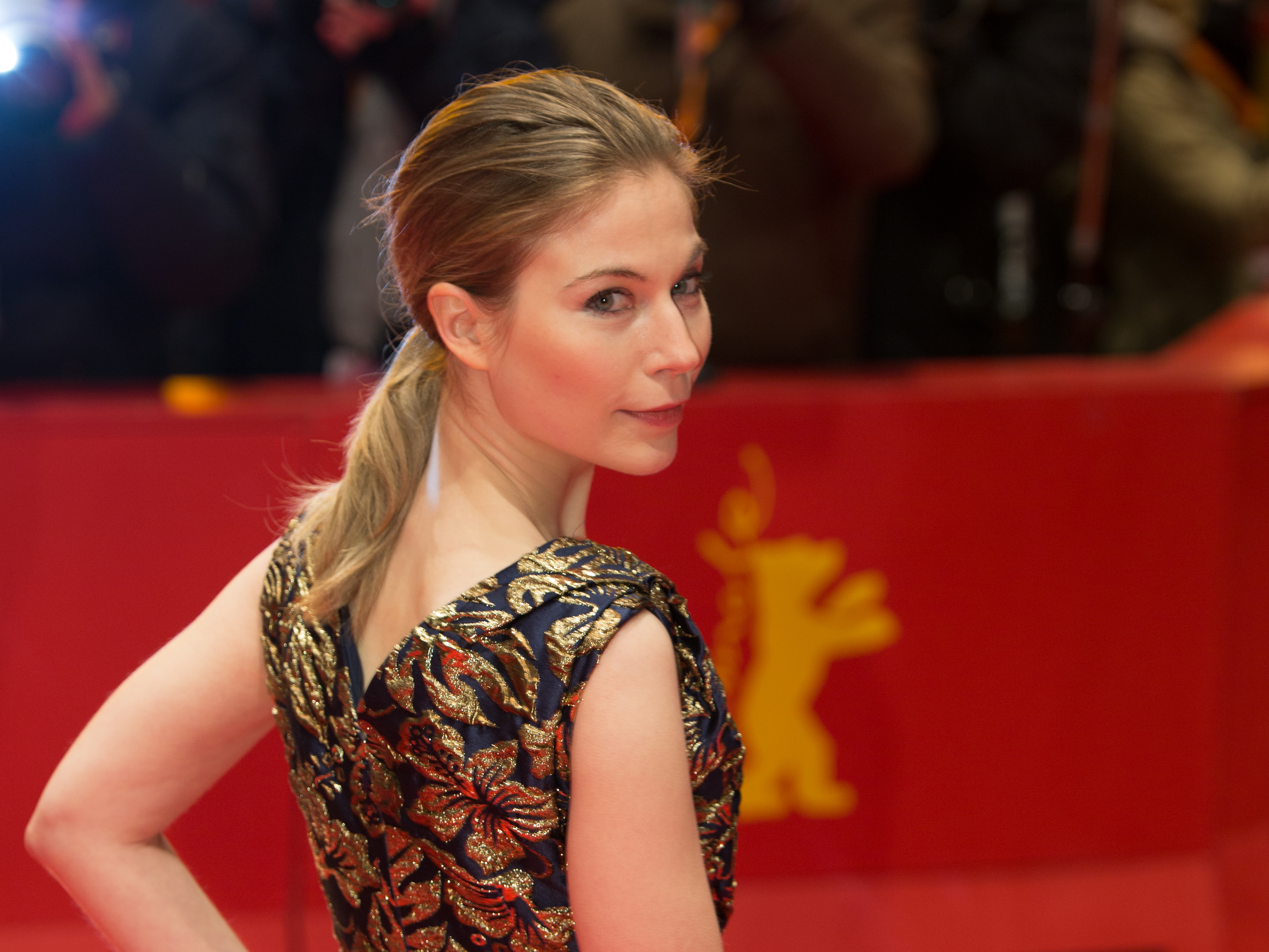
Waldstätten at the Berlinale 2017

Between 2014 and 2022, Waldstätten starred alongside Matthias Koeberlin in 15 feature-length episodes of the German-Austrian TV crime series Murder by the Lake.

=== Theatrical work ===
Since 2007, Waldstätten has played in several productions at the Deutsches Theater in Berlin. There, she appeared in the Jelinek play Über Animals. In 2010, she also appeared in two plays at the Schauspiel Köln.

== Personal life ==
With regard to the presentation of her name, Waldstätten's view, also shared by Hübner, is that an Austrian law that eliminated the nobility in that country also forbade use of noble titles; hence, while at the beginning of her career in Germany, Waldstätten used "von Waldstätten" as a stage name, as of 2010, Waldstätten was generally not using the "von" of her birth name, publicly. In Germany, where use of the "von" is not restricted, she continued to use it until the end of 2016.

As of this date, Waldstätten lived in Berlin.

== Awards and recognition ==
Awards That Waldstätten has Won
Year	Award	Category	Nominated work	Result	Citation
2009	New Faces Award	Best Young Actress	Tatort, Ep. "Herz aus Eis"	Won	
2010	Max Ophüls [Film Festival] Prize	Best Female Newcomer	Gravity [Schwerkraft]	Won	
2015	Film Festival Cologne Awards	International Actors Award	Life Eternal	Won	
