= The Door (2009 film) =

2009 film

- German poster
- Directed by: Anno Saul
- Written by: Akif Pirinçci (novel)
- Produced by: Ralph Schwingel; Bjoern Vosgerau
- Starring: Mads Mikkelsen; Jessica Schwarz
- Cinematography: Bella Halben
- Edited by: Andreas Radtke
- Music by: Fabian Römer
- Release date: 26 November 2009
- Running time: 118 minutes
- Country: Germany
- Language: German

The Door (German: Die Tür) is a 2009 German science fiction thriller film directed by Anno Saul and starring Mads Mikkelsen and Jessica Schwarz.

== Plot ==
An artist who, after losing his daughter, discovers a mysterious doorway leading to the past.

== Cast ==
- Mads Mikkelsen as David Andernach
- Jessica Schwarz as Maja Andernach
- Valeria Eisenbart as Leonie Andernach
- Thomas Thieme as Siggi Butschma
- Tim Seyfi as Max Oelze
- Stefan Gebelhoff as Paul Wiegand
- Suzan Anbeh as Susanne Wiegand
- Heike Makatsch as Gia
