= Claudia Lössl =

German actress (born 1966)

- Born: 2 October 1966 (age 59); Munich, West Germany
- Occupation: Actress
- Years active: 1987–present
- Known for: Boo, Zino & the Snurks
- Notable work: Tatort, Forsthaus Falkenau

Claudia Lössl (born 2 October 1966) is a German actress best known for her work in Boo, Zino & the Snurks and for dubbing the voices of actresses such as Penélope Cruz, Naomi Watts and Renée Zellweger in German releases of English-language films.

== Life and career ==
In Hamburg, Lössl received her education as an actor. In 1987, she was cast in Married... with Children (1987–1997), for which she provided the German voiceover for actress Christina Applegate as Kelly Bundy for ten years. She also synchronizes voices in animated films.

== Dubbing roles ==
=== Movies ===
For actress Penélope Cruz:

- 1997: Live Flesh as Isabel Plaza Caballero
- 1999: All About My Mother as Maria
- 2008: Elegy as Consuela Castillo
- 2009: Broken Embraces as Lena
- 2011: Pirates of the Caribbean – Foreign Tides as Angelica
- 2013: The Counselor as Laura
- 2013: I'm So Excited as Jessica
- 2014: Twice Born as Gemma
- 2016: Zoolander 2 as Valentina
- 2017: Murder on the Orient Express as Pilar Estravados

For actress Naomi Watts:

- 2005: King Kong as Ann Darrow
- 2007: Eastern Promises as Anna
- 2009: The International as Eleanor Whitman
- 2009: Mother and Child as Elizabeth
- 2010: Fair Game as Valerie Plame
- 2011: Dream House as Ann Patterson
- 2011: J. Edgar as Helen Gandy
- 2013: Diana as Princess Diana
- 2014: While We're Young as Cornelia
- 2015: Demolition as Karen Moreno
- 2016: Shut In as Mary Portman

=== Others ===
- 1993: Marisa Tomei in Untamed Heart as Caroline
- 1994: Renée Zellweger in Love and a .45 as Starlene Cheatham
- 1996: Jennifer Jason Leigh in Bastard Out of Carolina as Anney Boatwright
- 1997: Drew Barrymore in Wishful Thinking as Lena
- 1998: Drew Barrymore in The Wedding Singer as Julia Sullivan
- 1998: Emmanuelle Seigner in RPM as Michelle Claire
- 1998: Teri Polo in A Father for Brittany as Kim Lussier
- 1999: Alicia Silverstone in Blast from the Past as Eve Rustikoff
- 2000: Christina Applegate in The Brutal Truth as Emily
- 2000: Lindsay Sloane in Bring It On as Big Red
- 2001: Kristy Swanson in Soul Assassin as Tessa Jansen
- 2001: Teri Polo in The Unsaid as Barbara Lonigan
- 2002: Renée Zellweger in Chicago as Roxanne Hart
- 2002: Jennifer Jason Leigh in Hey Arnold!: The Movie as Bridget
- 2002: Lucy Liu in Ballistic: Ecks vs. Sever as Agent Sever
- 2002: Lucy Liu in Cypher as Rita Foster
- 2002: Rebecca Romijn in Rollerball as Aurora
- 2002: Roselyn Sánchez in Boat Trip as Gabriella
- 2003: Kristy Swanson in Silence as Dr. Julia Craig
- 2003: Missi Pyle in Bringing Down the House as Ashley
- 2003: Elizabeth Perkins in Finding Nemo as Cora (Coral)
- 2004: Dina Spybey in The Haunted Mansion as Emma
- 2005: Christina Applegate in Suzanne's Diary for Nicholas as Dr. Suzanne Bedford
- 2005: Julie Benz in 8mm 2 as Lynn
- 2005: Marisa Tomei in Factotum as Laura
- 2005: Joy Bryant in London as Mallory
- 2005: Renée Zellweger in Cinderella Man as Mae Braddock
- 2005: Mary McCormack in Madison as Bonnie McCormick
- 2005: Victoria Pratt in Tatort as Tara Jeffries
- 2005: Polly Shannon in Stone Cold as Abby Taylor
- 2005: Jane Sibbett in Buffalo Dreams as Blaine Townsend
- 2006: Mariya Poroshina in Day Watch as Svetlana
- 2006: Rebecca Romijn in Man About Town as Nina Giamoro
- 2006: Polly Shannon in Jesse Stone: Night Passage as Abby Taylor
- 2007: Radha Mitchell in Rogue as Kate Ryan
- 2008: Julie Benz in Punisher: War Zone as Angela
- 2008: Sarah Clarke in Twilight as Renée Dwyer
- 2009: Radha Mitchell in Thick as Thieves as Alex
- 2010: Sarah Clarke in The Twilight Saga: Eclipse as Renée Dwyer
- 2010: Kristen Wiig in MacGruber as Vicki St. Elmo
- 2011: Julie Benz in Ricochet as Elise Laird
- 2011: Brooke Shields in Chalet Girl as Caroline
- 2012: Kristen Wiig in Girl Most Likely as Imogene Duncan
- 2013: Connie Britton in Angels Sing as Susan Walker
- 2014: Marisa Tomei in The Rewrite as Holly Carpenter
- 2014: Sarah Paulson in 12 Years a Slave as Mistress Epps
- 2015: Christina Applegate in Vacation as Debbie Griswold
- 2015: Kristen Wiig in Hateship, Loveship as Johanna Parry

== Acting filmography ==
- 1989: Forsthaus Falkenau (TV series, 8 episodes)
- 1992: Happy Holiday (TV series, 1 episode)
- 1994–1995: Ein Fall für zwei (TV series, 2 episodes)
- 1995: Dr. Stefan Frank – Der Arzt, dem die Frauen vertrauen (TV series, episode "Dr. Frank und die Killerbakterien")
- 1996: Großstadtrevier (TV series, episode "Gute Nachbarschaft")
- 2002: Tatort: Der Fremdwohner (TV film)
- 2002: Finanzamt Mitte – Helden im Amt (TV series, 8 episodes)
- 2003: Der Ermittler (TV series, episode "Tödliches Wiedersehen")
- 2006: Das total verrückte Wunderauto (TV film)
- 2007: Die Copiloten (TV film)
- 2007: Die Lawine (TV film)
- 2008: Die Rosenheim-Cops (TV series, episode "Der Tod coacht mit")
- 2009: Tatort: Um jeden Preis (TV film)
