= Thomas Thieme =

German actor (born 1948)

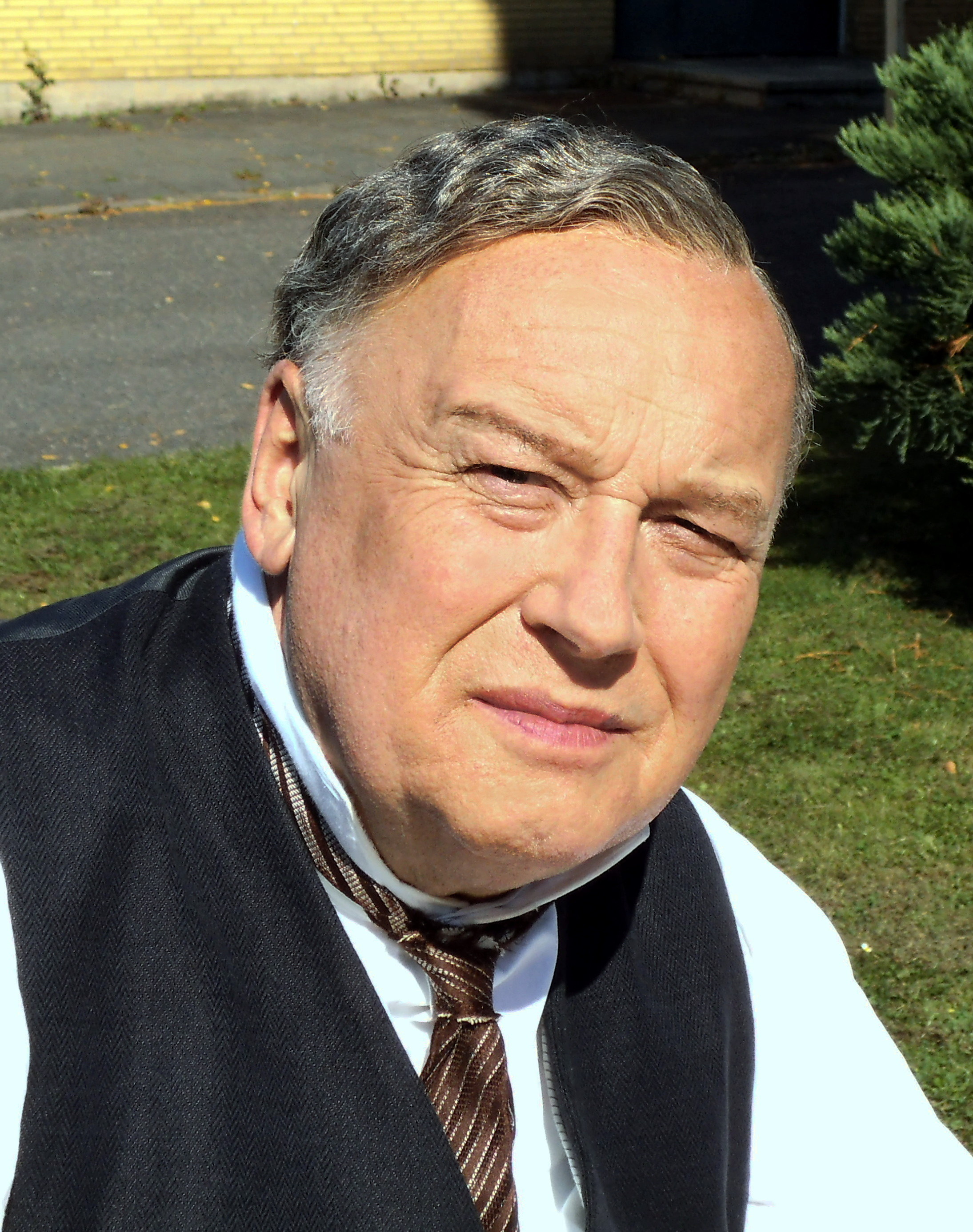
- Thieme in 2014
- Born: 29 October 1948 (age 77); Weimar, Soviet occupation zone in Germany
- Occupation: Actor
- Years active: 1973–present

Thomas Thieme (born 29 October 1948) is a German actor. He is considered to be a prolific stage actor and also appeared in more than 100 film and television productions since 1973.

In his film and television appearances, Thieme often plays powerful but morally dubious characters. He is perhaps best-known internationally for his roles as Martin Bormann in Downfall (2004) and as Communist minister Bruno Hempf in the Oscar-winning The Lives of Others, for which he was compared to Sydney Greenstreet by Roger Ebert in his review. He played former Bayern Munich boss Uli Hoeneß, who had to spend time in jail for tax evasion, in the 2015 television film Der Patriarch. He had a recurring role in the successful series Babylon Berlin as the police chief Karl Zörgiebel.

== Filmography ==
Film
Year	Title	Role	Notes
1973	Education Before Verdun		TV miniseries
1975	Lotte in Weimar	Kestner - Young	
1982	Das Fahrrad		
1998	Fat World	Gustl	
2001	Taking Sides	Reichsminister	
2003	Eierdiebe	Hans Schwarz	
2003	Hamlet_X	Polonius #2	
2004	Downfall	Martin Bormann	
2006	The Lives of Others	Kulturminister Bruno Hempf	
2007	The Hunt for Troy	Emperor William I	TV film
2007	Duel at Night	Ludwig Wellingsen	TV film
2008	The Baader Meinhof Complex	Richter Dr. Prinzing	
2009	Effi Briest	Herr von Briest	
2009	Männersache	Ingo Kloos	
2009	Krupp: A Family Between War and Peace	Gustav Krupp von Bohlen und Halbach	TV miniseries
2009	Berlin 36	Hans von Tschammer und Osten	
2009	Murder on Amrum	Heinz Koops	TV film
2009	The Door	Siggi Butschma	
2009	Der Mann aus der Pfalz	Helmut Kohl	TV film
2009	Beloved Berlin Wall	Stasi-Major Kutzner	
2011	If Not Us, Who?	Will Vesper	
2011	Lessons of a Dream	Dr. Roman Bosch	
2011	Hotel Lux	Georgi Dimitrov	
2011	Bastard	Alexander Decker	
2012	Frauensee	The Old Fisherman	
2012	Strangers and Lovers	Karl Ferber	TV film
2012	Rommel	Generalfeldmarschall Günther von Kluge	TV film
2013	Hotel Adlon: A Family Saga	Gustaf Schadt	TV miniseries
2013	Robin Hood	Rainer Van Kampen	
2013	The Berlin File	Siegmund	
2013	George	Paul Wegener	TV film
2014	The King's Surrender	Harthmann	
2014	The Cold Heart	Holländer-Michel	TV film
2014	Besondere Schwere der Schuld	Heinz Braun	TV film
2014–2015	Ein Fall für Zwei	Dr Oskar Renners	7 episodes
2015	Look Who's Back	Senderchef Kärrner	
2016	Fritz Lang	Ernst Gennat	
2017	Old Agent Men	Locke	
2017–2020	Babylon Berlin	Karl Zörgiebel	TV series
2018	Parfum	Internatsleiter	TV series
2018	Die Affäre Borgward	Carl F. W. Borgward	TV film
2019	The Audition	Walter	
