= Fahri Yardım =

German actor (born 1980)

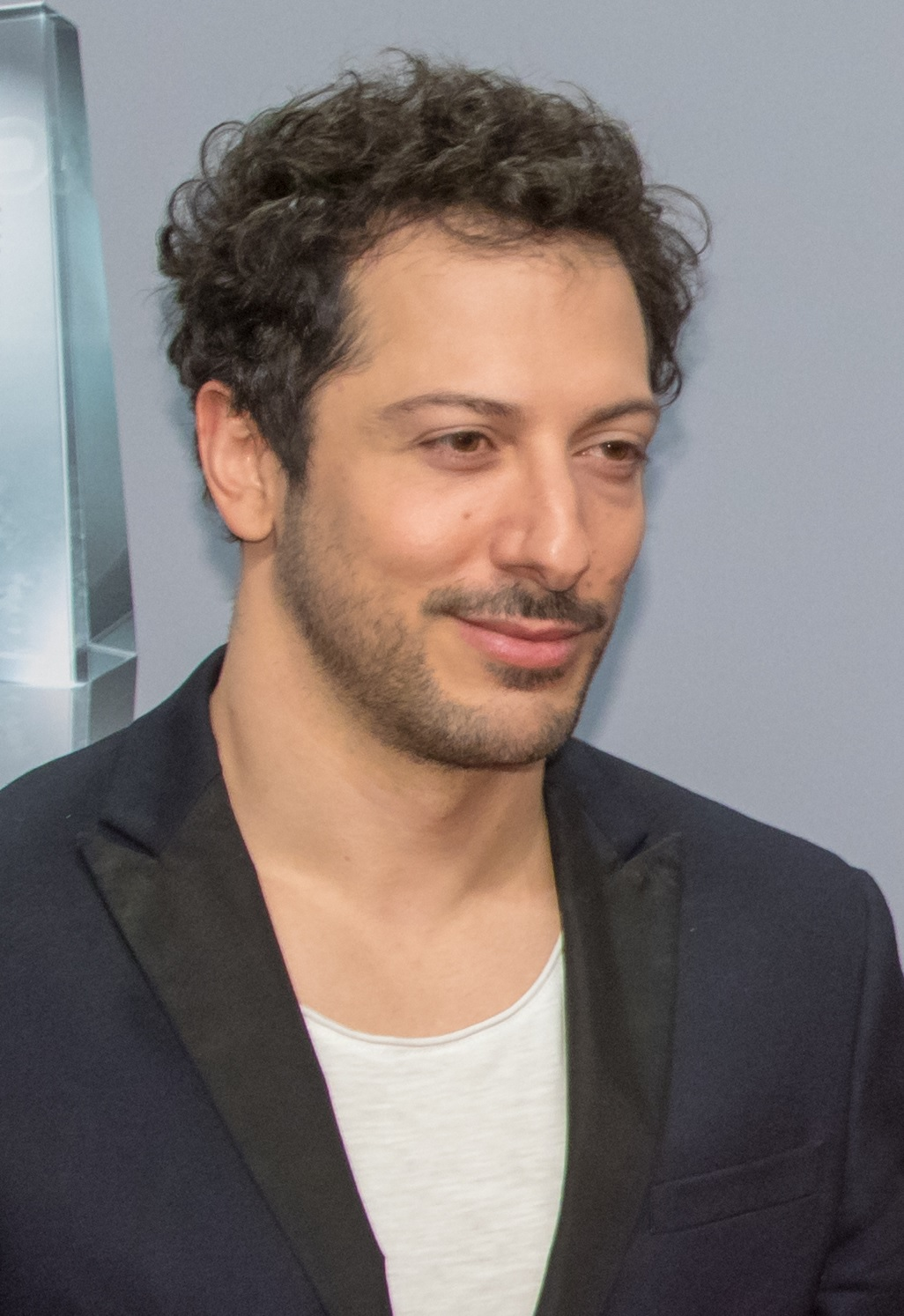
Yardım in 2018

Fahri Ogün Yardım (born 7 August 1980) is a German actor.

== Biography ==
Yardım was born in Hamburg, West Germany, where his parents moved from Turkey.

He is best known for his portrayal of Hüseyin in Almanya – Welcome to Germany and as investigator Yalcin Gümer in the German crime television series Tatort alongside Til Schweiger.

In 2013, he had a supporting role in the adventure film The Physician, which became an immediate box office hit in Germany.

== Selected filmography ==
Year	Title	Role	Notes
2004	Kebab Connection	Lefty	Film
2007	Rabbit Without Ears	Mucki	Film
2008	Chiko	Curly	Film
2009	Gravity		Film
2009	66/67: Fairplay Is Over	Tamer	Film
2011	Almanya – Welcome to Germany	Young Hüseyin	Film
2011	Kokowääh	Pizza deliverer	Film
2012	Don't You Believe It!	Paolo Barsotti / Vincenzo Barsotti	Film
2012	Men Do What They Can	Bronko Steiner	Film
2013	Tatort: Willkommen in Hamburg	Yalcin Gümer	TV series episode
2013	The Physician	Davout Hossein	Film
2014	Therapy Crashers	Daniel Lukas	Film
2014	Everything Is Love	Kerem	Film
2015	Half Brothers	Yasin	Film
2018	Dogs of Berlin	Erol Birkan	TV series
2018	Cut Off	Ender Müller	Film
2025	Delicious	John	Screened in Panorama at the 75th Berlin International Film Festival in February 2025.
2026	Extrawurst	Erol Oturan	Cinema film
