= Noah Gordon (novelist) =

American novelist (1926–2021)

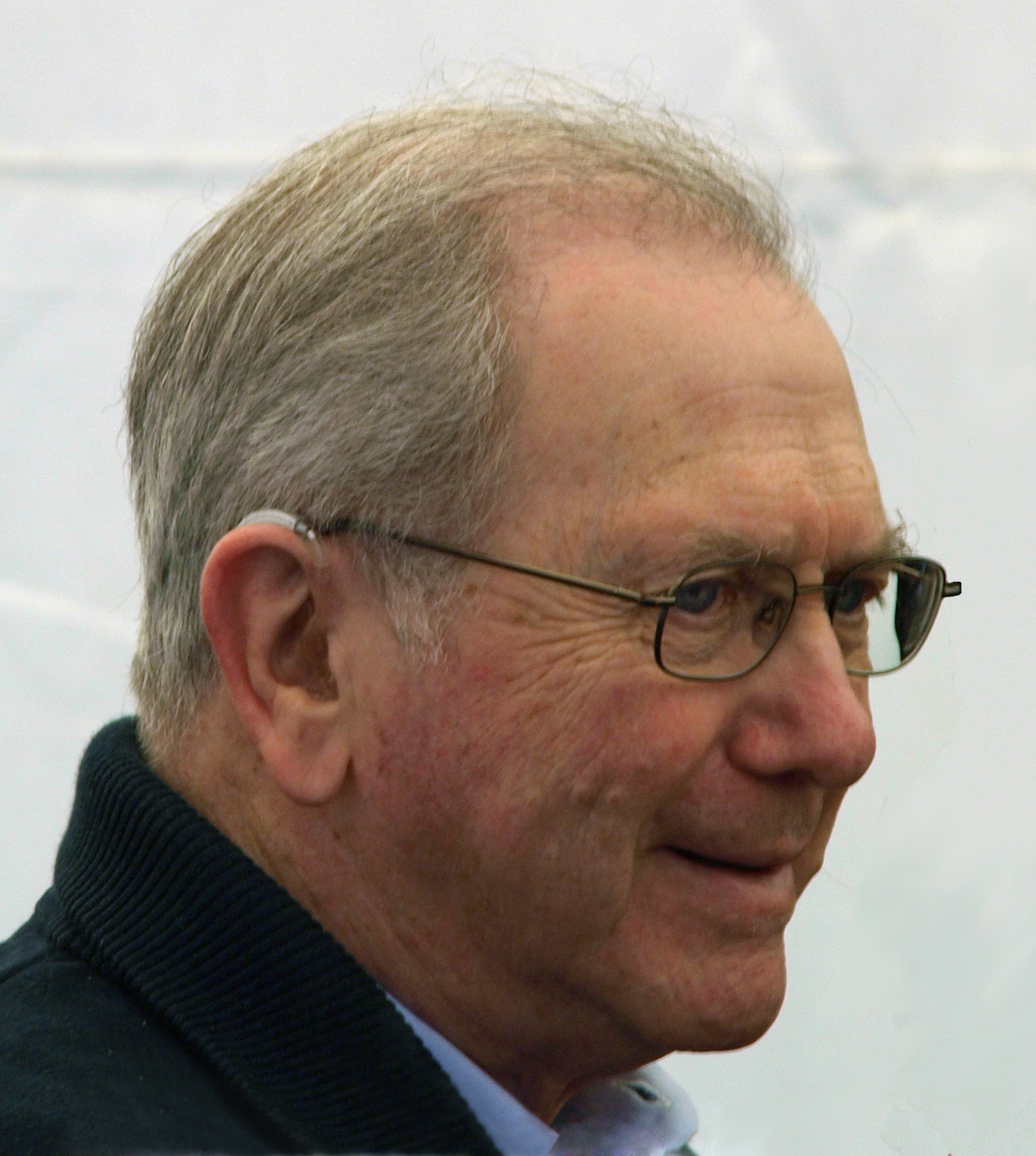
- Gordon introducing his book The Winemaker in Barcelona in 2008
- Born: November 11, 1926; Worcester, Massachusetts, U.S.
- Died: November 22, 2021 (aged 95); Dedham, Massachusetts, U.S.
- Occupation: Novelist
- Spouse: Lorraine Seay
- Children: 3

Noah Gordon (November 11, 1926 – November 22, 2021) was an American novelist.

== Early life and career ==
Gordon was born in Worcester, Massachusetts, on November 11, 1926, the son of a pawnbroker. He served in the US Army at the end of World War II. He reported for the Worcester Telegram until he was hired by the Boston Herald in 1959.

== Works and reception ==
Some of the topics covered within his novels include medical history and medical ethics. Later he began to focus more on themes relating to the Inquisition and Jewish cultural history.

Gordon's debut novel, The Rabbi, spent 26 weeks on The New York Times Best Seller list in 1965. When publishing The Physician, the book was picked up by Random House - Germany, which promoted the book in Europe, where Gordon became very popular in Spain and Italy. His novel The Last Jew won "Que Leer Prize" (Spain) and "Boccaccio Literary Prize" (Italy).

Though Gordon's reception internationally has been quite strong, as of 2015, the Boston Globe described Gordon as relatively unknown in the United States. New York Times writer Carey Goldberg described a similar tension between Gordon's widespread popularity in Germany and relative lack of awareness in the United States in 1996. The reasons for the European success of his novel The Physician were discussed in The Forward.

His novel Shaman won the first James Fenimore Cooper Prize for Best Historical Fiction in 1993.

== Personal life ==
Gordon had three children with his wife, Lorraine (née Seay). He died on November 22, 2021, in Dedham, Massachusetts, at the age of 95.

== Novels ==
- The Rabbi (1965)
- The Death Committee (1969)
- The Jerusalem Diamond (1979)
- The Last Jew (2000)
- Sam and Other Animal Stories (2002) (children's stories)
- The Winemaker (2007)

=== Cole family trilogy ===
- The Physician (1986) (film adaption in 2013)
- Shaman (1992)
- Matters of Choice (1995)
