= The Last Jew =

2000 novel by Noah Gordon

- First edition cover
- Author: Noah Gordon
- Publisher: St. Martin's Press
- Publication date: August 1, 2000
- ISBN: 0-312-26504-2

The Last Jew is a 2000 novel by American writer Noah Gordon. It is about the Jews in 15th-century Spain, in the time of the Inquisition, when they were expelled. It tells the story of the life of a Jewish boy named Yonah Toledano. He is the last of his line of renowned Jewish artists and bankers.

== Plot summary ==
The year is 1492 and Spain is in the grip of the Inquisition. The Church has sponsored anti-Jewish sentiment in the populace, culminating in the expulsion by royal edict of the entire Jewish community from their homes of many generations. Those that have not converted are forced to leave.

However, 15-year-old Yonah Toledano has been left behind. He has lost family members to the troubles, both his father, a celebrated Spanish silversmith, and his brother. On a donkey named Moise, he journeys, remaining a Jew, growing to manhood across Spain to escape his fate.

== Literary significance and reception ==
According to Publishers Weekly, Gordon "illuminates the choices history forces on individuals—and, not incidentally, creates a grand, informative adventure and a completely engaging, unsentimental portrait of a turbulent time."

"This is an excellent, abundant tapestry of a historical novel that will keep readers on the edges of their seats." — The Providence Journal

"Consistently superb ... The new novel showcases Gordon's strength as a writer of provocative historical fiction." — The San Francisco Chronicle

"Gordon is a natural storyteller, and, given the novel's fascinating setting and a more-than-likeable hero, this superior historical novel should have a place in all libraries." — Library Journal

== Awards and nominations ==
- Que Leer Prize winner (Spain)
- Boccaccio Literary Prize winner (Italy)

== Literature ==
- "The Last Jew Noah Gordon's official entry". Archived from the original on October 20, 2007.
