= 66/67: Fairplay Is Over =

2009 film

- German poster
- Directed by: Jan-Christoph Glaser; Carsten Ludwig
- Screenplay by: Carsten Ludwig
- Produced by: Alexander Bickenbach; Bickenbach Manuel; Jon Handschin
- Starring: Fabian Hinrichs; Christoph Bach; Melika Foroutan; Maxim Mehmet
- Edited by: Sarah Levine
- Music by: Dirk Dresselhaus
- Distributed by: Farbfilm-Verleih
- Release dates: 29 October 2009 (Hof International Film Festival); 19 November 2009 (Germany)
- Running time: 115 minutes
- Country: Germany
- Language: German

66/67: Fairplay Is Over (German: 66/67: Fairplay war gestern) is a 2009 German drama film directed by Carsten Ludwig and Jan-Christoph Glaser. The film tells the story of a group of hooligans of the German football club Eintracht Braunschweig.
