= The Physician =

1988 novel by Noah Gordon

- Cover of the 1st American Edition
- Author: Noah Gordon
- Cover artist: Wendell Minor
- Language: English
- Series: Cole Family series
- Genre: Historical novel
- Publisher: Simon & Schuster
- Publication date: August 7, 1986
- Publication place: United States
- Media type: Print (Hardback & Paperback)
- Pages: 608 pp (first edition, hardback)
- ISBN: 978-0-671-47748-6 (first edition, hardback)
- OCLC: 13269822
- Dewey Decimal: 813/.54 19
- LC Class: PS3557.O68 P49 1986

The Physician is a novel by Noah Gordon. It is about the life of a Christian English boy in the 11th century who journeys across Europe in order to study medicine among the Persians. The book was initially published by Simon & Schuster on August 7, 1986. The book did not sell well in America, but in Europe it was many times a bestseller, particularly in Spain and Germany, selling millions of copies in translation. Its European success caused its subsequent sequelization. The film rights to the book were purchased.

== Plot summary ==
=== Part One: Barber's Boy ===
It is the year 1020. Rob Cole is the eldest of many children. His father is a Joiner in the Guild of Carpenters in London. His mother, Agnes Cole, is his father's wife. Robert has a particular Gift: he can sense when someone is going to die. When his mother and father both die, the Cole household is parceled out to various neighbors and friends. The Cole children are parceled out likewise.

Rob is taken by the only one who wants him: a traveling barber-surgeon who goes only by the name of Barber. He is a fleshy man with fleshy appetites and a very great zest for life. Over the next years, he takes Rob as his apprentice. He teaches the boy how to juggle, to draw caricatures, to tell stories, to entertain a crowd, to sell the nostrum on which they make their living. He also teaches the boy all he knows of medicine—which is little.

When Barber dies, Rob takes over his traveling medicine show. But he is restless, desiring to know more about the ways of medicine. He meets a Jewish physician in Malmesbury who tells him of schools (Madrasahs) in Córdoba, Toledo, even in far-away Persia, where the medical and scientific learning of the Muslims is taught. Unfortunately, besides being worlds away, the schools do not admit Christians—and even if they did, no country in Christendom would allow a person with such heathen learning to return.

In a moment of epiphany, Rob decides that he shall take on the guise of a Jewish student, so that he can travel to Persia and study at the feet of Avicenna (Ibn Sina). This decision carries its own risks: while Jews generally were allowed more freedom in the Muslim world than they were in Christian Europe, Rob would still have to cross Europe, where Jews were routinely faced with blood libels, expulsions, forced conversions and killings.

=== Part Two: The Long Journey ===
Rob travels, as a Christian, from London throughout Europe to Constantinople. Here he becomes Jewish in appearance, and travels eastwards with a group of Jewish merchants, learning their ways as best he can.

He also meets a young woman called Mary Margaret Cullen, who was traveling with her father, in search of superior Turkish sheep. The pair falls in love and become occasional lovers, but as Mary, by her father, proposes marriage to Rob, he dismisses her, saying that he needed to study medicine and telling her all his plans. The Cullens leave the caravan and Rob continues his journey.

=== Part Three: Isfahan ===
Rob arrives in the city of Isfahan, in the heart of the Abbasid Caliphate (in present-day Iran), and tries to enter into the school of physicians there. He is not allowed access. He struggles to survive in the city, homeless, while searching for a way to enter the school.

=== Part Four: The Maristan ===
A chance encounter with the Shah of Persia opens for Rob the door to the school of physicians (Bimaristan). Here he begins the study of medicine—the first formal study he has ever had in his life. At the same time he immerses himself in the life of a Persian Jew.

=== Part Five: The War Surgeon ===
Comparable to a surgical residency or similar term of practicum, Rob goes to a war-torn (and plague-torn) land to practice his medical knowledge. His journeys with the Shah's armies take him as far as India, where he encounters elephants, spices, and Wootz steel. He makes friends among the Muslim students of the school.

Upon his return he encounters Mary, who lost her father. As she has nowhere to go, and once they seem to love each other, although she is Christian, they form a liaison, and are secretly wed. Mary doesn't deal well with the new city, as she is neglected for being red-haired. Regardless of all, Mary gets pregnant and has the child while Rob is in India, acting as a doctor and for the first time touching a corpse's heart.

=== Part Six: Hakim ===
He is passed as a physician and helps to instruct new physicians in the school. Rob and Mary's son is named Robert James Cole. She, at one point, is visited by Ibn Sina, who tells her that the Shah requested her presence, otherwise he'd kill Rob. Mary understood that it meant that the Shah intended to have sex with her, and goes to him. After having sex with Shah, she gets pregnant. When the child, named Thomas Scott, is born, the Shah sends him a rug, and Rob realizes that Thomas is not his son. Mary, however, tells him that she kept them both alive, and leaves his bedroom. However, when Mary beats him for thinking that he had been with prostitutes, the two are able to tell the truth and reconcile themselves.

Soon afterwards, Avicenna dies, and Isfahan is conquered by a rival king. Rob, his wife and children flee the rape and pillage and make their laborious way back to England.

=== Part Seven: The Returned ===
Rob struggles to locate his lost brothers and sisters, likewise to make his place amongst the terribly ignorant physicians of London. Despairing, he returns with his wife and family to Scotland, where he acts as physician to his wife's people high in the hills.

== Awards and nominations ==
- 1999, Madrid Book Fair attendees called The Physician, "one of the ten most beloved books of all time".

== Film, TV or theatrical adaptations ==
While Gordon's novel was not a huge hit in the U.S., it topped best-seller lists across continental Europe and a motion picture was in development in Europe for UFA Cinema and Universal Pictures. The German film director Philipp Stölzl was positioned to direct the historic epic, which has secured €3.3 million ($4.6 million) in regional and federal German funding. The production was scheduled for summer 2012 on location in Quedlinburg, Morocco and Romania.

The film premiered in German theaters on 25 December 2013. It was an immediate box-office hit and earned the producers two Bogey Awards, one for more than 1,000 visitors per copy on its opening weekend, and a second Bogey for 1 million visitors within ten days.

The film was also released as two-part mini-series for the German public TV ARD and later as a complete movie.

The Physician had a musical made in Spain. It's composed by Ivan Macias and adapted by Felix Amador. In 2017-2018 a concert version was done and did a tour through some Spanish cities., Adrián Salzedo as Rob y Talía del Val as Mary. In October 17 it was the world premier of El médico el musical in Madrid, with Adrián Salzedo as Rob, Sofía Escobar as Mary, Joseán Moreno as Barber and Alain Damas as Sha. In September 2019, Gerónimo Rauch and Daniel Diges alternate the role of Rob. In 12 of January 2020 El médico did the last performance in Madrid and was going to go to Barcelona, but due the pandemic this was cancelled. A new production by Dario Regattieri was premiered in December 22 of 2021 in Sevilla to do a tour. Rob was play by Guido Balzareti and Mary by Cristina Picos. The tour finished in Zaragoza in 26 of February 2023. On 6 November 2024 El medico was back at the stages and for the first time in Barcelona, this time with Federico Salles as Rob and Alba Cuartero as Mary. After finished this season in Barcelona, the musical did a mini tour. The tour will finish in Zaragoza the 18 of May. Out of Spain, in 2016 there was a first musical of this book composed by Dennis Martin and premiered in schlosstheater in Fulda, Germany, called Der medicus, with Friedrich Rau as Rob and Sabrina Weckerlin as Mary. The version of Ivan Macias and Felix Amador was premiered in 2022 in Metské Divadlo, in Brno, Chequia, directed by Stanislav Moša and with Libor Matouš and Richard Pekárek alternating in the role of Rob, and Kristýna Daňhelová and Esther Mertová in the role of Mary. In Munich, Germany, was premiered in 2023, also with Stanislav Moša as director, Bosse Vogt as Rob and Miriam Neumaier as Mary. This summer the musical will return to Germany, this time in Plauen, in Theater Plauen Zwickau. The directors will be Jose Luis Sixto and Francesc Abós, Friedrich Rau as Rob and Elisabeth Birgmeier as Mary.
