= Böhse Onkelz discography =

- Studio albums: 16
- Extended plays: 3
- Live albums: 6
- Compilation albums: 4
- Singles: 9
- Video albums: 5
- Music videos: 2

This is the discography for the German rock band Böhse Onkelz. According to record certifications and additional sources they have sold over 5,338,000 records and 425,000 videos/DVDs in their career. E.I.N.S. is their most successful album with over 510,000 units sold. Seven of their albums peaked at number one on the German albums chart. The Onkelz are one of the most bootlegged bands with over 250 bootlegs circulating as of 2005. Their albums spent 311 weeks on the German albums chart.

== Albums ==
=== Studio albums ===
| Year | Title | Peak chart positions | | | Notes |
| Year | Title | GER | AUT | SWI | Notes |
|---|---|---|---|---|---|
| 1984 | Der nette Mann | — | — | — | Release date: 1984; Sales: 2,000 indexed in 1986 |
| 1985 | Böse Menschen – Böse Lieder | — | — | — | Release date: 1985; Sales: 4,000 |
| 1987 | Onkelz wie wir... | 31 (3 We.) | — | — | Release date: 1987; Re-release: 2 November 2007; Sales: 16,000 |
| 1988 | Kneipenterroristen | 3 (6 Wo.) | 18 (2 Wo.) | 45 (2 Wo.) | Release date: 10 October 1988; Sales: 30,000 |
| 1990 | Es ist soweit | — | — | — | Release date: 1 August 1990; Sales: 60,000 |
| 1991 | Wir ham' noch lange nicht genug | — | — | — | Release date: 26 August 1991; Sales: 250,000 |
| 1992 | Heilige Lieder | 5 (13 We.) | 7 (7 We.) | — | Release date: 31 August 1992; Sales: 250,000 |
| 1993 | Weiß | 10 (13 We.) | 16 (16 We.) | 37 (2 We.) | Release date: 4 October 1993; Sales: 250,000 |
| 1993 | Schwarz | 12 (13 We.) | 15 (16 We.) | 38 (2 We.) | Release date: 4 October 1993; Sales: 250,000 |
| 1995 | Hier sind die Onkelz | 5 (27 We.) | 12 (16 We.) | 25 (4 We.) | Release date: 25 September 1995; Sales: 330,000 |
| 1996 | E.I.N.S. | 4 (19 We.) | 6 (16 We.) | 32 (5 We.) | Release date: 23 October 1996; Sales: 510,000 |
| 1998 | Viva los tioz | 1 (24 We.) | 3 (10 We.) | 10 (6 We.) | Release date: 4 September 1998; Sales: 350,000 |
| 2000 | Ein böses Märchen | 1 (22 We.) | 2 (9 We.) | 11 (9 We.) | Release date: 20 March 2000; Sales: 370,000 |
| 2002 | Dopamin | 1 (23 We.) | 4 (12 We.) | 13 (8 We.) | Release date: 15 April 2002; Sales: 150,000 |
| 2004 | Adios | 1 (17 We.) | 6 (12 We.) | 4 (10 We.) | Release date: 26 July 2004; Sales: 200,000 |
| 2016 | Memento | 1 (22 We.) | 1 (16 We.) | 1 (11 We.) | Release date: 28 October 2016 |
| 2020 | Böhse Onkelz | 1 (… We.) | 1 (… We.) | 1 (… We.) | Release date: 28 February 2020 |

=== Live albums ===
| Year | Title | Peak chart positions | | | Notes |
| Year | Title | GER | AUT | SWI | Notes |
|---|---|---|---|---|---|
| 1992 | Live in Vienna | 61 (1 We.) | 38 (2 We.) | — | Release date: 16 March 1992; Sales: 250,000 |
| 1997 | Live in Dortmund | 5 (32 We.) | 9 (14 We.) | 39 (3 We.) | Release date: 21 August 1997; Sales: 300,000 |
| 2001 | 20 Jahre – Live in Frankfurt | 19 (5 We.) | — | — | Release date: 22 October 2001; Sales: 75,000 |
| 2005 | Live in Hamburg | 1 (24 We.) | 7 (15 We.) | 28 (7 We.) | Release date: 11 April 2005; Sales: 100,000 |
| 2017 | Live in Dortmund II | 3 (12 We.) | 4 (7 We.) | 8 (6 We.) | Release date: 26 May 2017 |
| 2024 | 40 Jahre Onkelz – Live im Waldstadion | 1 (… We.) | 4 (… We.) | 53 (… We.) | Release date: 26 January 2024 |

=== Compilations ===
| Year | Title | Peak chart positions | | | Notes |
| Year | Title | GER | AUT | SWI | Notes |
|---|---|---|---|---|---|
| 1994 | Gehasst, verdammt, vergöttert | 47 (9 We.) | 13 (16 We.) | 36 (5 We.) | Release date: 21 October 1994; Sales: 250,000 |
| 2001 | Gestern war heute noch morgen | 3 (26 We.) | 13 (13 We.) | 24 (7 We.) | Release date: 5 March 2001; Sales: 150,000 |
| 2011 | Lieder wie Orkane | 7 (11 We.) | — | — | Release date: 2 December 2011 |
| 2015 | 35 Jahre Böhse Onkelz – Symphonien und Sonaten | 5 (9 We.) | 18 (2 We.) | 22 (1 We.) | Release date: 11 December 2015 |
| 2018 | Kneipenterroristen (30 Jahre Kneipenterroristen – Neuaufnahme 2018) | 15 (… We.) | — | — | Release date: 10 October 2018 |

=== Extended plays ===
| Year | Title | Peak chart positions | | | Notes |
| Year | Title | GER | AUT | SWI | Notes |
|---|---|---|---|---|---|
| 1985 | Mexico | — | — | — | Release date: 1985; Sales: 8,000 |
| 1989 | Lügenmarsch | — | — | — | Release date: 1989 |
| 1997 | Danke für nichts – Biography EP | — | — | — | Release date: 1997; Sales: 25,000 |

=== Sampler ===
- 1982: Soundtracks zum Untergang 2 (Neuer deutscher Punk-Underground)

== Singles ==
| Year | Title | Peak Chart positions | | | Notes |
| Year | Title | GER | AUT | SWI | Notes |
|---|---|---|---|---|---|
| 1981 | "Kill the Hippies – Oi" | — | — | — | Release date: 1981 |
| 1992 | "Ich bin in dir" Heilige Lieder | — | — | — | Release date: 1992; Sales: 45,000 |
| 1995 | "Finde die Wahrheit"; Hier sind die Onkelz | — | — | — | Release date: 1995 |
| 1998 | "Terpentin"; Viva los Tioz | 7 (11 We.) | 8 (10 We.) | — | Release date: 3 August 1998; Sales: 200,000 |
| 2000 | "Dunkler Ort"; Ein böses Märchen… …aus tausend finsteren Nächten | 2 (10 We.) | 17 (7 We.) | 22 (7 We.) | Release date: 31 January 2000; Sales: 250,000 |
| 2002 | "Keine Amnestie für MTV"; Dopamin | 2 (11 We.) | 8 (11 We.) | 25 (8 We.) | Release date: 18 February 2002 |
| 2004 | "Onkelz vs. Jesus"; Adios | 2 (10 We.) | 9 (12 We.) | 16 (9 We.) | Release date: 20 June 2004; Sales: 150,000 |
| 2015 | "Wir bleiben" | 4 (4 We.) | 32 (1 We.) | — | Release date: 4 September 2015 |
| 2016 | "Irgendwas für nichts" Memento | 58 (1 We.) | — | — | Release date: 21 October 2016 |

=== Other releases ===
- 1998: Shape CD (ticket for the 1998 tour)
- 2005: Wenn du wirklich willst (played in the last scene and the credits of the film Kombat Sechzehn from Mirko Borscht)

== Videography ==
=== VHS ===
- 1985: Böse Menschen – Böse Lieder
- 1987: Onkelz wie wir
- 1992: Live in Vienna (Ger 2)
- 1994: B.O.S.C Fan-Video
- 1997: Live in Dortmund (Ger 1)
- 2000: Dunkler Ort + Clip – Making of
- 2000: Tourfilm 2000 (Ger 1)

=== DVDs ===
| Year | Title | Peak chart positions | | | Notes |
| Year | Title | GER | AUT | SWI | Notes |
|---|---|---|---|---|---|
| 2001 | Tourfilm 2000 | 1 | — | — | Release date: 12 March 2001; Sales: 100,000 |
| 2001 | 20 Jahre – Live in Frankfurt | 2 | — | — | Release date: 2001; Sales: 75,000 |
| 2005 | La Ultima / Live in Berlin | 1 (14 We.) | — | 77 (1 We.) | Release date: 19 June 2005; Sales: 100,000 |
| 2007 | Vaya Con Tioz | 1 (32 We.) | 2 (8 We.) | 45 (1 We.) | Release date: 16 February 2007; Sales: 100,000 |
| 2008 | Live in Vienna | — | — | — | Release date: 2008; Sales: 50,000 |
| 2008 | Live in Dortmund | — | — | — | Release date: 2008; Sales: 50,000 |

- 2004: Adios DVD

=== Music videos ===
| Year | Title | Director |
|---|---|---|
| 2000 | "Dunkler Ort"; Ein böses Märchen... ...aus tausend finsteren Nächten | Frederik Gunnarson |
| 2004 | "Onkelz vs. Jesus"; Adios | |

== Unauthorised releases ==
| Year | Title | Peak chart positions | | | Notes |
| Year | Title | GER | AUT | SWI | Notes |
|---|---|---|---|---|---|
| 1994 | Könige für einen Tag | — | 16 (7 We.) | — | Release date: 3 April 1994 |
| 1996 | Nur die Besten sterben jung | 86 (3 We.) | — | — | Release date: 15 June 1996 |
| 1998 | Buch der Erinnerung | 58 (19 We.) | — | — | Release date: 4 Mai 1998 |
| 2001 | Wir schrieben Geschichte | 44 | — | — | Release date: 25 June 2001 |
| 2003 | Fahrt zur Hölle! | 38 (2 We.) | — | 66 (2 We.) | Release date: 21 July 2003; Sales: 20,000 |

=== Other releases ===
- 1986: No Surrender! Vol. 2, 'Rock-o-Rama' (banned in Germany because of songs from the debut album)
- 1988: Freitag Nacht, 'Rock-o-Rama'
- 1988: Hässlich, 'Rock-o-rama' (banned in Germany because of songs from the debut album)
- 1989: Hass / Was kann ich denn dafür, 'Street Rock’n’Roll'
- 1989: Stolz / Singen und Tanzen, 'Street Rock’n’Roll'
- 1990: 6. für Deutschland, 'Metal Enterprises'
- 1992: 6. für Deutschland Vol. II, 'Metal Enterprises'
- 1994: Fanatorium
- 1995: Digital World (Best of 1991–1993), 'Bellaphon'
- 1995: Heilige Lieder GOLD – Limited Edition, 'Bellaphon'
- 1998: Buch der Erinnerung, 'Bellaphon'

== Record certifications ==
Gold certification

- Germany
  - 1995: for the album Heilige Lieder
  - 1996: for the album E.I.N.S.
  - 1996: for the album Hier sind die Onkelz
  - 1997: for the album Wir ham' noch lange nicht genug
  - 1997: for the video Live in Dortmund
  - 1997: for the video Live in Vienna
  - 1998: for the album Live in Dortmund
  - 2000: for the single "Dunkler Ort"
  - 2000: for the album Ein böses Märchen aus tausend finsteren Nächten
  - 2001: for the album Gestern war heute noch morgen
  - 2003: for the album Gehasst, verdammt, vergöttert
  - 2003: for the album Live in Vienna
  - 2003: for the album Schwarz
  - 2003: for the album Weiß
  - 2005: for the album Live in Hamburg
  - 2005: for the DVD La Ultima / Live in Berlin
  - 2006: for the DVD Böhse Onkelz Tour 2000
  - 2020: for the album Böhse Onkelz
- Austria
  - 1998: for the album Viva los Tioz
  - 1998: for the album Hier sind die Onkelz
  - 1998: for the album E.I.N.S.

Platinum certification

- Germany
  - 2000: for the album Ein böses Märchen aus tausend finsteren Nächten
  - 2003: for the video Live in Vienna
  - 2005: for the DVD La Ultima / Live in Berlin
  - 2006: for the album E.I.N.S.
  - 2006: for the DVD 20 Jahre - Live in Frankfurt
  - 2006: for the DVD Böhse Onkelz Tour 2000
  - 2006: for the video Live in Dortmund
  - 2016: for the album Memento

3× Gold certification

- Germany
  - 2005: for the DVD La Ultima / Live in Berlin
  - 2006: for the DVD 20 Jahre - Live in Frankfurt

2× Platinum certification

- Germany
  - 2007: for the DVD La Ultima / Live in Berlin

| Country | Gold | Platinum |
|---|---|---|
| Germany | 24 | 10 |
| Austria | 3 | 0 |
| total | 26 | 9 |
