= Live in Dortmund II =

Live album by Böhse Onkelz
- Released: 26 May 2017
- Venue: Westfalenhalle, Dortmund
- Genre: Hard rock
- Length: 98:50
- Label: Matapaloz
- Producer: Böhse Onkelz

Böhse Onkelz chronology
| Memento (2016) | Live in Dortmund II (2017) | Kneipenterroristen (30 Jahre Kneipenterroristen – Neuaufnahme 2018) (2018) |

Live in Dortmund II is the 10th live album by the German hard rock band Böhse Onkelz. It was released on 26 May 2017 by the band-owned label Matapaloz. The predecessor Live in Dortmund was published in 1997.

== Content ==
The album contains cuts from the band's live performances at the Dortmunder Westfalenhalle on 24 and 25 November 2016 during their Memento tour. Both concerts had an attendance of approximately 15,000 people.

== Cover artwork ==
The cover is mostly blue and shows the band's guitarist Matthias Röhr, leaning forward, standing in the spotlight. His guitar touches the ground. In the upper half of the cover is the typical Böhse Onkelz lettering in white, and in the lower half the album's title is featured in blue.

== Critical reception ==
Manuel Berger of laut.de gave the album 3 out of 5 stars. The band plays in top form, he says, especially Kevin Russell, whose vocals prove that he has recovered fully health- and voicewise. But he was missing the songs "Der Junge mit dem Schwefelholz" and "Nach allen Regeln der Sucht" from the new studio album Memento, while he identifies the ballads "Wieder mal nen Tag verschenkt" and "Wo auch immer wir stehen" as the weaker songs.

== Chart performance ==
Live in Dortmund II entered the German albums chart on 2 June 2017 on no. 3 and stayed in the top 100 for twelve weeks. In Austria, the album peaked at no. 4 and in Switzerland at no. 8. In the 2017 Germany year-end albums chart, Live in Dortmund II placed no. 84.

== Track listing ==
CD1

1. "Intro" – 1:27
2. "Gott hat ein Problem" (God's got a problem) – 5:02 (first published on Memento, 2016)
3. "10 Jahre" (Ten years) – 3:06 (Es ist soweit, 1990)
4. "Finde die Wahrheit" (Find the truth) – 3:55 (Hier sind die Onkelz, 1995)
5. "Irgendwas für nichts" (Something for nothing) – 3:24 (Memento, 2016)
6. "Nie wieder" (Never again) – 4:07 (Kneipenterroristen, 1988)
7. "Gehasst, verdammt, vergöttert" (Hated, damned, praised) – 3:05 (Heilige Lieder, 1992)
8. "Auf die Freundschaft" (To friendship) – 4:09 (Memento, 2016)
9. "Schutzgeist der Scheiße" (Guardian Spirit of Shit) – 4:48 (Ein böses Märchen, 2000)
10. "Lieber stehend sterben" (Prefer to die standing) – 3:48 (Gehasst, verdammt, vergöttert, 1994)
11. "Nur die Besten sterben jung" (Only the good die young) – 3:53 (Wir ham' noch lange nicht genug, 1991)
12. "Jeder kriegt was er verdient" (Everybody gets what he deserves) – 4:35 (Memento, 2016)
13. "Dunkler Ort" (Dark place) – 4:04 (Ein böses Märchen, 2000)
14. "Wieder mal 'nen Tag verschenkt" (Another day wasted) – 4:02 (Wir ham´noch lange nicht genug, 1991)

CD2

1. "52 Wochen" (52 weeks) – 3:11 (Memento, 2016)
2. "Danke für nichts" (Thanks for nothing) – 3:38 (Hier sind die Onkelz, 1995)
3. "Bomberpilot" (Bomber Pilot) – 3:29 (Onkelz wie wir, 1987)
4. "Wo auch immer wir stehen" (Wherever we stand) – 6:36 (Memento, 2016)
5. "Mach's dir selbst" (Do it yourself) – 3:30 (Memento, 2016)
6. "Auf gute Freunde" (To good friends) – 7:19 (E.I.N.S., 1996)
7. "Wir ham' noch lange nicht genug" (We have by no means had enough) – 4:03 (Wir ham' noch lange..., 1991)
8. "Kirche" (Church) – 5:48 (E.I.N.S., 1996)
9. "Mexico" (Mexico) – 3:02 (Mexico, 1985)
10. "Erinnerungen" (Memories) – 5:26 (Onkelz wie wir, 1987)

== Personnel ==
- Kevin Russell – vocals
- Stephan Weidner – additional vocals, bass guitar
- Matthias Röhr – guitar
- Peter Schorowsky – drums

== Charts ==
=== Weekly charts ===
Weekly chart performance for Live in Dortmund II
| Chart (2017) | Peak position |
|---|---|
| Austrian Albums (Ö3 Austria) | 4 |
| German Albums (Offizielle Top 100) | 3 |
| Swiss Albums (Schweizer Hitparade) | 8 |

=== Year-end charts ===
Year-end chart performance for Live in Dortmund II
| Chart (2017) | Position |
|---|---|
| German Albums (Offizielle Top 100) | 84 |
