= Dopamin =

Studio album by Böhse Onkelz
- Released: 15 April 2002
- Recorded: 2002
- Genre: Hard rock
- Length: 46:22
- Label: Rule23
- Producer: Stephan Weidner, Michael Mainx

Böhse Onkelz chronology
Gestern war heute noch morgen	Dopamin	Adios

Professional ratings
Review scores
Source	Rating
Rock Hard	(8.0/10)

"Keine Amnestie für MTV"

Dopamin is the fifteenth studio album by German rock band Böhse Onkelz. It was released in 2002. The album was entirely recorded on the Spanish island Ibiza and mastered in the Abbey Road Studios in London.

== Personnel ==
- Vocals: Kevin Russell
- Bass, Vocals, Keyboards: Stephan Weidner
- Guitar: Matthias Röhr
- Drums: Peter Schorowsky

== Track listing ==
1. Die Firma (The company)
2. Narben (Scars)
3. Macht für den der sie nicht will (Power to those who don't want it)
4. Mutier mit mir (Mutate with me)
5. Keine Amnestie für MTV (No amnesty for MTV)
6. Wie kann das sein (How can it be)
7. Nr. 1 (Number one)
8. Stand der Dinge (State of Affairs)
9. Ich weiß wo du wohnst (I know where you live)
10. Keine Zeit (No time)
11. Jetzt oder nie (Now or never)
12. Nur wenn ich besoffen bin (Only when I'm drunk)

== Track notes ==
=== "Die Firma" ===
The typical leading song of an Onkelz album: A self-praising anthem for the band and their fans.

=== "Narben" ===
A song of scars and the way they remind its owner of old times. "A book written in skin"

=== "Macht für den der sie nicht will" ===
Song against lying politicians, who are only interested in political power. "On the front for the nazis, they were informers of the Stasi, and today they say there's democracy".

=== "Mutier mit mir" ===
A song to make a change in life and start over new. "This is the time to be reborn"

=== "Keine Amnestie für MTV" ===
The Böhse Onkelz and MTV stood in contact several times, MTV wanted to make an MTV Masters about this band. The Persian reporter became acquainted with the whole history of the Onkelz. Two days before MTV sent the Masters, they suspended the reporter and cut the whole Masters in a "public-suited" format, which means that none of the reproaches against the Onkelz could be cleared up.

=== "Wie kann das sein" ===
A song against the sex-tourism to Southeast-Asia, especially against those who abuse children.

=== "Nr. 1" ===
Against Klaus Walter, a German journalist known for his critical attitude against the band.

=== "Stand der Dinge" ===
A song about the melancholy of life without change and the will to escape from it.

=== "Ich weiß wo du wohnst" ===
A song about stalking.

== Single ==
=== Keine Amnestie für MTV ===
==== Track listing ====
1. Keine Amnestie für MTV
2. Narben
3. Coz I Luv You
4. Je t'aime... moi non plus

== Charts ==
=== Weekly charts ===
Chart (2002)	Peak position
Austrian Albums (Ö3 Austria)	4
German Albums (Offizielle Top 100)	1
Swiss Albums (Schweizer Hitparade)	13

=== Year-end charts ===
Chart (2002)	Position
Austrian Albums (Ö3 Austria)	70
German Albums (Offizielle Top 100)	15

== Certifications ==
Region	Certification	Certified units/sales
Germany (BVMI)	Gold	150,000^{^}
^{^} Shipments figures based on certification alone.
