= List of number-one hits of 2016 (Germany) =

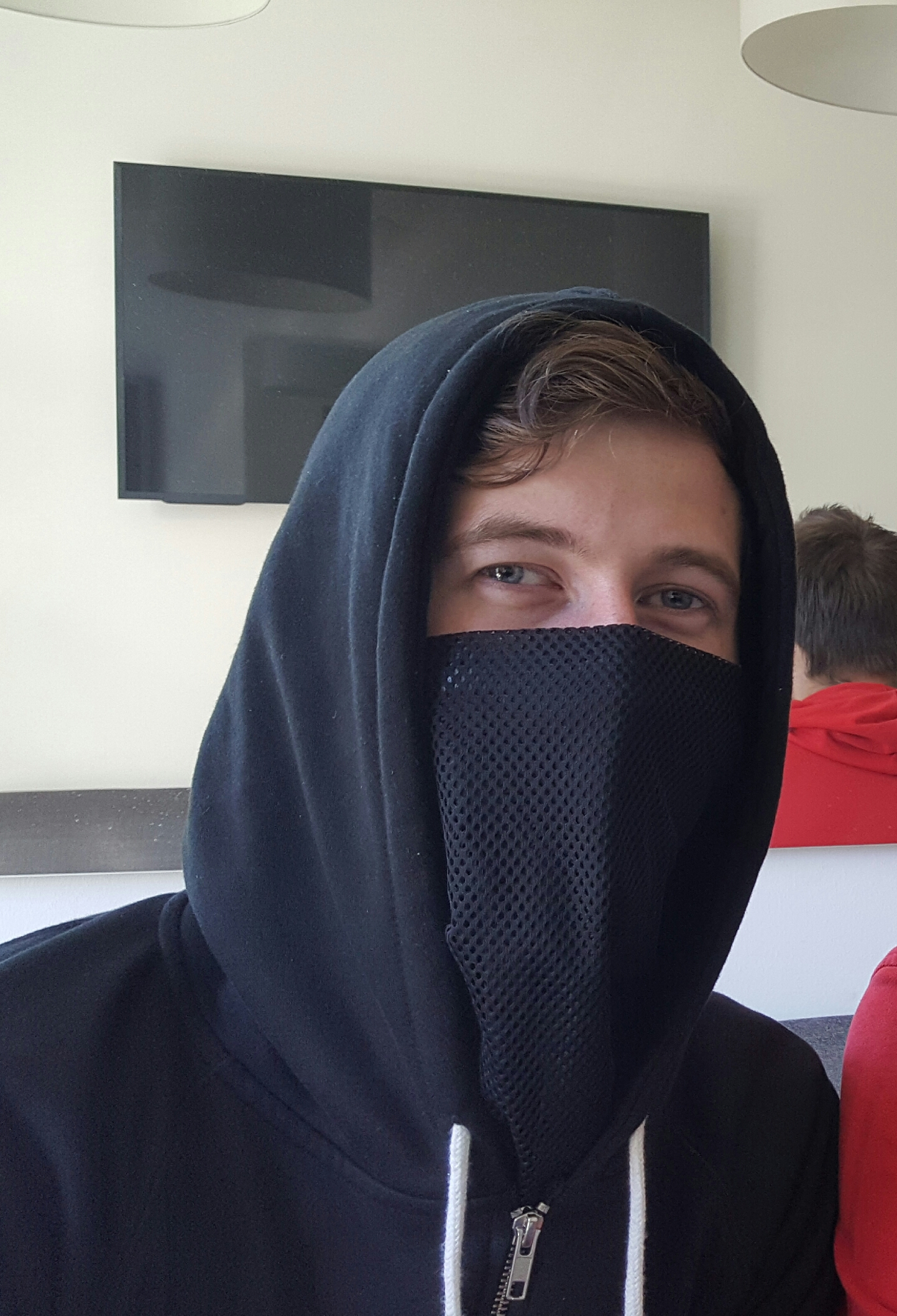
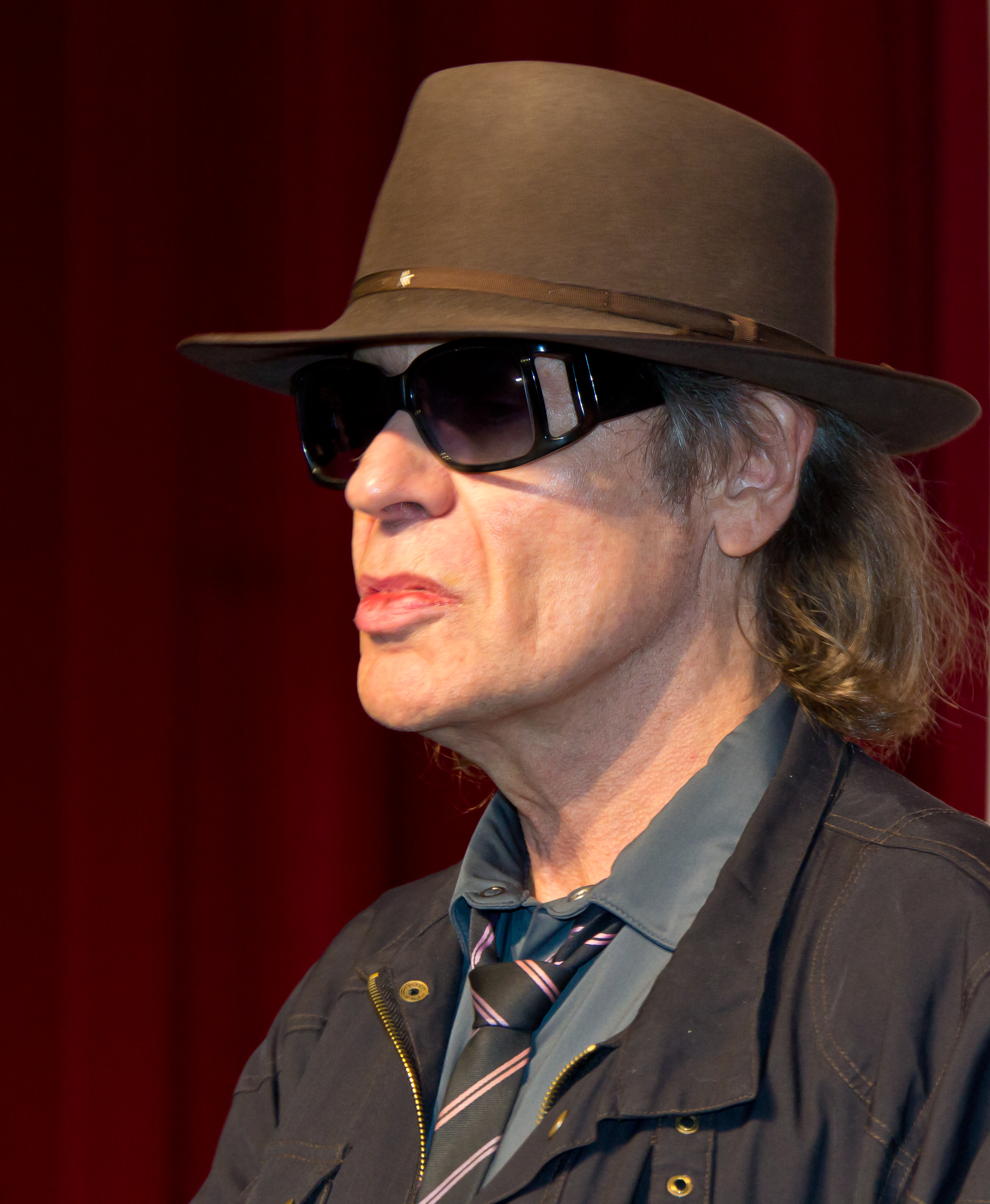
Alan Walker's "Faded" became the best-performing single of 2016, while Udo Lindenberg's "Stärker als die Zeit" became the best-performing album of the year.

The Media Control charts are record charts compiled by Media Control on behalf of the German record industry. They include the "Single Top 100" and the "Album Top 100" chart. The chart week runs from Friday to Thursday, and the chart compilations are published on Tuesday for the record industry. The entire top 100 singles and top 100 albums are officially released the following Friday by Media Control. The charts are based on sales of physical singles and albums from retail outlets as well as permanent music downloads.

== Number-one hits by week ==
Key
†	Indicates best-performing single and album of 2016

Issue date	Song	Artist(s)	Ref.	Album	Artist(s)	Ref.
1 January	"Hello"	Adele		25	Adele	
8 January	"Hello"	Adele		25	Adele	
15 January	"Catch & Release (Deepend Remix)"	Matt Simons		Blackstar	David Bowie	
22 January	"Stimme"	EFF		Leben II	Azad	
29 January	"Stimme"	EFF		Cemesis	Summer Cem	
5 February	"Stimme"	EFF		0,9	SSIO	
12 February	"Faded" †	Alan Walker		Im Westen nix Neues	Prinz Pi	
19 February	"Faded" †	Alan Walker		Engtanz	Bosse	
26 February	"Faded" †	Alan Walker		Freudensprünge	Fantasy	
4 March	"Faded" †	Alan Walker		Future	Schiller	
11 March	"Faded" †	Alan Walker		Bibi & Tina – Mädchen gegen Jungs	Peter Plate, Ulf Leo Sommer & Daniel Faust	
18 March	"Faded" †	Alan Walker		Bibi & Tina – Mädchen gegen Jungs	Peter Plate, Ulf Leo Sommer & Daniel Faust	
25 March	"Faded" †	Alan Walker		Alles nix Konkretes	AnnenMayKantereit	
1 April	"Faded" †	Alan Walker		Jomsviking	Amon Amarth	
8 April	"Faded" †	Alan Walker		Nicht von dieser Welt 2	Xavier Naidoo	
15 April	"Faded" †	Alan Walker		Seelenbeben	Andrea Berg	
22 April	"Cheap Thrills"	Sia featuring Sean Paul		Seelenbeben	Andrea Berg	
29 April	"Cheap Thrills"	Sia featuring Sean Paul		Seelenbeben	Andrea Berg	
6 May	"One Dance"	Drake featuring Wizkid & Kyla		Stärker als die Zeit †	Udo Lindenberg	
13 May	"Glücksmoment"	Prince Damien		Stärker als die Zeit †	Udo Lindenberg	
20 May	"Can't Stop the Feeling!"	Justin Timberlake		Stärker als die Zeit †	Udo Lindenberg	
27 May	"Can't Stop the Feeling!"	Justin Timberlake		Labyrinth	Kontra K	
3 June	"Can't Stop the Feeling!"	Justin Timberlake		High & Hungrig 2	Gzuz & Bonez MC	
10 June	"This Girl"	Kungs vs. Cookin' on 3 Burners		Seal the Deal & Let's Boogie	Volbeat	
17 June	"This One's for You"	David Guetta featuring Zara Larsson		Seal the Deal & Let's Boogie	Volbeat	
24 June	"This Girl"	Kungs vs. Cookin' on 3 Burners		Böhse für's Leben	Böhse Onkelz	
1 July	"This Girl"	Kungs vs. Cookin' on 3 Burners		Quid pro quo	In Extremo	
8 July	"Don't Be So Shy (Filatov & Karas Remix)"	Imany		Mikrokosmos	257ers	
15 July	"Don't Be So Shy (Filatov & Karas Remix)"	Imany		Ellipsis	Biffy Clyro	
22 July	"Don't Be So Shy (Filatov & Karas Remix)"	Imany		Bleib unterwegs	Laith Al-Deen	
29 July	"Don't Be So Shy (Filatov & Karas Remix)"	Imany		Wie ein Feuerwerk	Die Amigos	
5 August	"Don't Be So Shy (Filatov & Karas Remix)"	Imany		Afraid of Heights	Billy Talent	
12 August	"Don't Be So Shy (Filatov & Karas Remix)"	Imany		Lady in Gold	Blues Pills	
19 August	"Don't Be So Shy (Filatov & Karas Remix)"	Imany		Der Holland Job	Coup	
26 August	"Don't Be So Shy (Filatov & Karas Remix)"	Imany		#Zwilling	Die Lochis	
2 September	"Don't Be So Shy (Filatov & Karas Remix)"	Imany		Advanced Chemistry	Beginner	
9 September	"Don't Be So Shy (Filatov & Karas Remix)"	Imany		Vibe	Fler	
16 September	"Let Me Love You"	DJ Snake featuring Justin Bieber		Palmen aus Plastik	Bonez MC & RAF Camora	
23 September	"Let Me Love You"	DJ Snake featuring Justin Bieber		Leuchtfeuer	Schandmaul	
30 September	"Human"	Rag'n'Bone Man		Palmen aus Plastik	Bonez MC & RAF Camora	
7 October	"Human"	Rag'n'Bone Man		Sorceress	Opeth	
14 October	"Human"	Rag'n'Bone Man		Sturm & Stille	Sportfreunde Stiller	
21 October	"Human"	Rag'n'Bone Man		Neuanfang	Clueso	
28 October	"Human"	Rag'n'Bone Man		Immer noch Mensch	Tim Bendzko	
4 November	"Human"	Rag'n'Bone Man		Memento	Böhse Onkelz	
11 November	"Human"	Rag'n'Bone Man		Von Mensch zu Mensch	Unheilig	
18 November	"Human"	Rag'n'Bone Man		DREAMS	Shindy	
25 November	"Human"	Rag'n'Bone Man		Hardwired... to Self-Destruct	Metallica	
2 December	"Human"	Rag'n'Bone Man		Abstand	KC Rebell	
9 December	"Human"	Rag'n'Bone Man		Blue & Lonesome	The Rolling Stones	
16 December	"Rockabye"	Clean Bandit featuring Sean Paul & Anne-Marie		Imperator	Kollegah	
23 December	"Human"	Rag'n'Bone Man		Weihnachten	Helene Fischer & The Royal Philharmonic Orchestra	
30 December	"Rockabye"	Clean Bandit featuring Sean Paul & Anne-Marie		Weihnachten	Helene Fischer & The Royal Philharmonic Orchestra	

== See also ==
- List of number-one hits (Germany)
- List of German airplay number-one songs
