= Memento (Böhse Onkelz album) =

Studio album by Böhse Onkelz
- Released: 28 October 2016
- Studio: WireWorld (Nashville, Tennessee)
- Genre: Hard rock
- Length: 56:38
- Label: Matapaloz
- Producer: Matt "Gonzo" Roehr; Stephan Weidner; Michael Mainx (co-producer)

Böhse Onkelz chronology
Onkelz wie wir... (re-recording) (2007)	Memento (2016)	Böhse Onkelz (2020)

Memento is the 16th studio album and at the same time the comeback album of the German hard rock band Böhse Onkelz. It was released on 28 October 2016 on their then newly-founded label Matapaloz.

== Title ==
The title of the album Memento is Latin for "remember". The band was inspired to choose this name by the movie Memento.

== Cover ==
The band had asked their supporters in July 2016 to send them pictures of their Onkelz-tattoos, promising them that all pictures would be printed on the CD or the booklet. With that, they wanted to thank their fans for the years of support and show the strong bonds between them and their fans.

== Track listing ==
1. "Gott hat ein Problem" (Engl. "God's got a problem") – 5:01
2. "Frei" ("Free") – 4:23
3. "Markt und Moral" ("Market and morals"), 3:55
4. "Jeder kriegt was er verdient" ("Everybody gets what he deserves") – 4:49
5. "Mach's dir selbst" ("Do it yourself") – 3:31
6. "Irgendwas für nichts" ("Something for nothing") – 3:26
7. "Wo auch immer wir stehen" ("Wherever we are") – 6:38
8. "Es ist sinnlos mit sich selbst zu spaßen" ("It's pointless to have fun only by yourself") – 4:40
9. "Der Junge mit dem Schwefelholz" ("The boy with the match") – 7:43
10. "Nach allen Regeln der Sucht" ("By the rules of addiction") – 5:05
11. "Auf die Freundschaft" ("To friendship") – 4:09
12. "52 Wochen" ("52 weeks") – 3:18

== Personnel ==
- Kevin Russell – vocals
- Stephan Weidner – additional vocals, bass guitar
- Matthias Röhr – guitar
- Peter Schorowsky – drums
- Paul Taylor – piano

== Charts ==
=== Weekly charts ===
Chart (2016)	Peak position
Austrian Albums (Ö3 Austria)	1
Belgian Albums (Ultratop Wallonia)	96
German Albums (Offizielle Top 100)	1
Swiss Albums (Schweizer Hitparade)	1

=== Year-end charts ===
Chart (2016)	Position
Austria (Ö3 Austria Top 40)	25
Germany (Official German Charts)	8
Switzerland (Schweizer Hitparade)	55
Chart (2017)	Position
Germany (Official German Charts)	59

== Certifications ==
Region	Certification	Certified units/sales
Germany (BVMI)	Platinum	200,000^{‡}
^{‡} Sales+streaming figures based on certification alone.
