= Ein böses Märchen =

Böhse Onkelz album

Studio album by Böhse Onkelz
- Released: 20 March 2000
- Recorded: 2000
- Genre: Hard rock
- Length: 53:23
- Label: Rule23 Recordings
- Producer: Stephan Weidner, Michael Mainx

Böhse Onkelz chronology
Viva los tioz	Ein böses Märchen	Tour 2000

Ein böses Märchen ...aus tausend finsteren Nächten (German for An evil fairytale from thousand darkly nights) is the German hard rock band Böhse Onkelz 14th album. It was released in 2000 under the new, from the Onkelz founded label rule23 Recordings.

== Track listing ==
1. Onkelz 2000
2. Dunkler Ort (Dark place)
3. Exitus
4. Schutzgeist der Scheiße (Guardian spirit of shit)
5. Lüge (Lie)
6. Knast (Prison)
7. C'est la vie (That's life)
8. Danke (Thanks)
9. Es ist wie es ist (It is how it is)
10. Zuviel (Too much)
11. Gesichter des Todes (Faces of death)
12. Panamericana (Instrumental)

Professional ratings
Review scores
Source	Rating
Rock Hard	(8.0/10)

== Single ==
=== Dunkler Ort ===
==== Track listing ====
1. Dunkler Ort
2. Schutzgeist der Scheiße
3. Das Signum des Verrats (re-recording from the song of the album Böse Menschen - Böse Lieder)

== Charts ==
Chart (2000)	Peak position
Austrian Albums (Ö3 Austria)	2
German Albums (Offizielle Top 100)	1
Swiss Albums (Schweizer Hitparade)	11

== Certifications ==
Region	Certification	Certified units/sales
Germany (BVMI)	Platinum	300,000^{^}
^{^} Shipments figures based on certification alone.
