= Weiß & Schwarz =

Two 1993 studio albums by Böhse Onkelz

Studio album by Böhse Onkelz
- Released: 4 October 1993
- Recorded: 1993
- Genre: Hard rock
- Length: 48:06 (White); 50:17 (Black)
- Label: Bellaphon Records
- Producer: Stephan Weidner

Böhse Onkelz chronology
Heilige Lieder	Weiß & Schwarz	Gehasst, verdammt, vergöttert

Cover of Schwarz

Professional ratings
Review scores
Source	Rating
Rock Hard	(8.5/10)

Weiß & Schwarz (German for White & Black) is a work consisting of two albums by German rock band Böhse Onkelz. Both were released at the same time in 1993. The track numbering begins with 1 through 12 on Weiß and ends with 13 through 23 on Schwarz.

== Track listing ==
=== Weiß ===
1. "Lieber stehend sterben" (Rather die standing)
2. "Entfache dieses Feuer" (Spark this fire)
3. "Das Wunder der Persönlichkeit" (The wonders of the personality)
4. "Fahrt zur Hölle" (Go to hell)
5. "Alles F. a. M." (All cunts except for mom)
6. "Willkommen" (Welcome)
7. "Für immer" (Forever)
8. "Deutschland im Herbst" (Germany in autumn)
9. "Es" (It)
10. "Sie hat 'nen Motor" (She's got a motor)
11. "Tribute to Stevie"
12. "Schöne neue Welt" (Beautiful new world)

=== Schwarz ===
- 13. "Erkennen Sie die Melodie" (Do you recognize this melody)
- 14. "Wenn wir einmal Engel sind" (If we're once angels)
- 15. "So geht's dir (deine Hölle)" (This is how you feel (Your hell))
- 16. "Der Himmel kann warten" (Heaven can wait)
- 17. "Ich bin wie ich bin" (I am as I am)
- 18. "Das Messer und die Wunde" (The knife and the wound)
- 19. "1000 Fragen" (1000 questions)
- 20. "Ich bin du" (I'm you)
- 21. "Worte der Freiheit" (Words of freedom)
- 22. "Das Rätsel des Lebens" (The mystery of life)
- 23. "Baja"

== Track notes ==
=== Das Wunder der Persönlichkeit ===
No one should have an idol or make all things that his idol do, one should live his own life.

=== Fahrt zur Hölle ===
Another song against the press. The Spiegel had interchanged the bandphotos of 1984 and 1992, other newspapers and magazines would not believe that the Onkelz weren't and aren't Nazis.

=== Alles F.a. M. ===
Full length title: "Alles Fotzen außer Mutti". A song that shows that a pervert man who hates women can't accept that he is the only one who thinks wrong.

=== Für immer ===
As Weidner says, this is a very personally song about the end of a love story.

=== Deutschland im Herbst ===
This song was written as a reaction of the attacks by neo-Nazis on asylum-seekers' houses in Mölln, Rostock-Lichtenhagen and Hoyerswerda. The press had seen some photos of the attackers, who wore Onkelz merchandise and wrote that the Onkelz were guilty for these attacks. The band wanted to make it understood that they condemn such attacks.

The song is introduced with a broadcast news message (translated):

Rostock. After yesterday's excesses before the central approach place for asylum seekers in Mecklenburg-Western Pomerania around 1,000 mostly young right-wing extremists today also battled against the police on the road. By the—in parts—civil war similarly riots the attackers had thrown with stones, bottles and fireworks against the safety men. More than 110 officials were partly heavily injured. The right-wing extremists, who came from across the federal republic, broke into the floor of the asylum-seekers' homes, and ignited—with applause from around 2,000 onlookers—some apartments. The police arrested around 60 persons. The foreign countries reacted—in remembering to the national-socialistic Germany—to the continuous riots in the quarter of Lichtenhagen with concern about increasing hatred of strangers.

Lyrics from the song:

I see brown* shit killing ...
I hear stupid slogans from idiots and losers ...

* Brown was the colour of Hitler's Nazi Party (NSDAP).

=== Sie hat 'nen Motor ===
A fun-song about Weidners Harley Davidson and his Chevrolet.

=== Tribute to Stevie ===
Gonzo and Weidner were fans of Stevie Ray Vaughan, who died in 1990. This instrumental was composed by Gonzo and it's the only known track which wasn't composed by Weidner.

=== Schöne neue Welt ===
"Listen, folks and people: Hit yourself! Hate your neighbour for you want to be independent! Kill your brother! Rape your wife! You speak the same language, but you can't trust each other. 'Beautiful' new world - our enemies are we self. That's how dreams are dying". The central message is to stop wars all over the world.

"Schöne neue Welt" rather means "Brave new world" (as the novel by Aldous Huxley). The translation "Beautiful new world" however is a kind of one-to-one translation, showing the exact meaning of the German words (for better understanding).

=== So geht's dir (deine Hölle) & Das Messer und die Wunde ===
Both are written for the murderer of Andreas "Trimmi" Trimborn, a good friend of the band, who was stabbed by a Bundeswehr soldier in June 1990.

=== Ich bin wie ich bin ===
A song about personal freedom, expressing the thought that no society should oppress one's own personality.

=== Worte der Freiheit ===
Written to all former East German residents, who grumble and cry after the re-union of Germany didn't went as well as planned (economically).

== Charts ==
Chart (1993)	Peak position
Austrian Albums (Ö3 Austria)	16
German Albums (Offizielle Top 100)	10
Swiss Albums (Schweizer Hitparade)	37

== Certifications ==
Region	Certification	Certified units/sales
Germany (BVMI)	Gold	250,000^{^}
^{^} Shipments figures based on certification alone.
