= Wir ham' noch lange nicht genug =

Studio album by Böhse Onkelz
- Released: 26 August 1991
- Recorded: 1991
- Genre: Hard rock
- Length: 57:44
- Label: Bellaphon
- Producer: Stephan Weidner

Böhse Onkelz chronology
Es ist soweit	Wir ham' noch lange nicht genug	Live in Vienna

Wir ham' noch lange nicht genug (German for "We're not done yet") is the eighth album by the German rock band Böhse Onkelz. It was released in 1991.

Professional ratings
Review scores
Source	Rating
Rock Hard	(8.0/10)

== Track listing ==
1. Wir ham' noch lange nicht genug (We're not done yet)
2. Eine dieser Nächte (One of these nights)
3. Das ist mein Leben (This is my life)
4. Nur die Besten sterben jung (Only the best ones die young)
5. Ganz egal (It doesn't matter)
6. Zieh' mit den Wölfen (Go with the wolves)
7. Zeig' mir den Weg (Show me the way)
8. Das erste Blut (First blood)
9. Wieder mal 'nen Tag verschenkt (Another wasted day)
10. Ach, Sie suchen Streit (Ah, you're looking for trouble)
11. 3'52"
12. Wir sind immer für Euch da (We are always here for you)
13. Wir sind nicht allein (We are not alone)
14. Lt. Stoned

== Track notes ==
Nur die Besten sterben jung
This song was written in memory of Andreas "Trimmi" Trimborn, the band's best friend. He was murdered on 16 June 1990, after the Onkelz and Trimmi had gone into the "Speak Easy", a tavern in Frankfurt-Sachsenhausen.

Ganz egal
The murderer of Trimmi was not convicted by the court. Stephan Weidner would appeal to his certain one.

Zeig' mir den Weg
"If you know all better, show me the way" A song against the press, who condemn the Onkelz further as a Nazi-band.

3'52"
An instrumental track. The band could not find a name for it and named it after its duration.

== Certifications ==
Region	Certification	Certified units/sales
Germany (BVMI)	Gold	250,000^{^}
^{^} Shipments figures based on certification alone.
