= E.I.N.S. =

Studio album by Böhse Onkelz
- Released: 23 October 1996
- Recorded: 1996
- Genre: Hard rock
- Length: 64:19
- Label: Virgin Schallplatten
- Producer: Stephan Weidner

Böhse Onkelz chronology
Hier sind die Onkelz	E.I.N.S.	Live in Dortmund

Professional ratings
Review scores
Source	Rating
Rock Hard	(8.5/10)

E.I.N.S. (German for "O.N.E.") is the twelfth album by German rock band Böhse Onkelz . It was released in 1996. The album title is not an abbreviation: the dots between the letters should be seen to strengthen and emphasise the word eins ("one").

"E.I.N.S." was voted several times into the Top 10 of the column "Best metal album of all time" from several German magazines like Rock Hard or Metal Hammer.

The cover shows a morphed face with one ear (Kevin Russell), one eye (Matthias "Gonzo" Röhr), nose (Peter "Pe" Schorowsky) and mouth (Stephan Weidner). The followed tour had the name "Unter dem Auge des Gonz" (Under the eyes of Gonz), and at the back of the stage was to see a huge eye.

== Track listing ==
1. Danket dem Herrn (Thank the Lord)
2. Nichts ist so hart wie das Leben (Nothing is as tough as life)
3. Wie tief willst Du noch sinken (How deep do you want to sink)
4. Ihr sollt den Tag nicht vor dem Abend loben (Don't praise the day before the evening)
5. Zu nah an der Wahrheit (Too close to the truth)
6. Meister der Lügen (Master of lies)
7. Kirche (Church)
8. Flammen (Flames)
9. Koma - Eine Nacht, die niemals endet (Coma - A night that never ends)
10. Auf gute Freunde (To good friends)
11. Regen (Rain)
12. Zeit zu gehn (Time to go)
13. Enie Tfahcstob rüf Ediona-RAP (A egassem rof sdiona-RAP)

== Track notes ==
=== Danket dem Herrn ===
In this typical opener song, where the band celebrates itself and their fans, there are bible quotes at some lines. "Duftende Blumen in Feldern voll Scheiße" (Smelling flowers in fields full of shit) can be found in the Book of Isaiah as "All meat is grass, and all his goodness is like a tree at a field". Through the bible writers view, the fields had to be fertilized. The quote "Perlen vor die Säue" (Pearls before the sows) comes from the Gospel of Matthew. The line "Uns liegt das Herz auf der Zunge" (Our hearts are lying at our tongues) is a changed quote from Job, "My heart is telling the sincere words". The self designation "die fantastischen Vier" (The fantastic four) comes from the song "Onkelz wie wir" from the same-named album.

=== Ihr sollt den Tag nicht vor dem Abend loben ===
This song is written for two bands, which saying or singing every time they can something against the Onkelz: Die Ärzte and Die Toten Hosen. The Ärzte sang "zwischen Störkraft und den Onkelz steht ne Kuschelrock-LP" (between Störkraft and the Onkelz stands a Kuschelrock-CD) (From: "Schrei nach Liebe", 1993). Campino of the Tote Hosen compared the Onkelz with "Landser booklet lyrics". Störkraft and Landser are two neonazi bands from Germany.

"Ihr sollt den Tag nicht vor dem Abend loben" rather means "Don't count your chickens before they are hatched", though the translation in this title is more or less a one-to-one translation, showing the real meanings of the words used.

=== Meister der Lügen ===
Meister der Lügen (Masters of lies) is a song against the press.

=== Kirche ===
In opinion of the band, this song is addressed only to the Roman Catholic Church and not against the Christians. Stephan Weidner has the opinion, that the church "should distribute their money to the poor and not their compassion" and that "the organized religion is the biggest obstacle at the way to peace." The song itself requests to not use the church as a sprag. The sentence "Wer keine Angst vor dem Teufel hat, braucht auch keinen Gott" (Who doesn't fear the devil, doesn't need a god) comes from the novel "The Name of the Rose" (Umberto Eco, 1980).

=== Enie Tfahcstob rüf Ediona-RAP ===
A journalist from the daily newspaper "Darmstädter Echo" believed they had found a scandal, when they saw that title of one of the Onkelz' songs, which (in their opinion) was read backwards as "Arier On". In fact, the song title isn't Noreira but Noreia, the name of a Celtic god. In reaction to this and other witch hunts, the band released a song on the "E.I.N.S." album called "Enie Tfahcstob rüf ediona-RAP" - backwards "Eine Botschaft für Paranoide" (A message for the paranoid). This features Stephan Weidner delivering a message backwards, which can be heard if the song is played in reverse:

(translated) Congratulations. Must've been a lot of work playing this song backwards. Either you are one of the paranoid assholes we've created this song for, or you're simply curious. For the former, let me say: Anyone expecting satanic or fascist messages to be played backwards on our records must be downright silly and, what's more, probably has a persecution complex. You poor creature, we really feel sorry for you! Better lock yourself up and throw away the key.

== Charts ==
=== Weekly charts ===
Chart (1996)	Peak position
Austrian Albums (Ö3 Austria)	6
German Albums (Offizielle Top 100)	4
Swiss Albums (Schweizer Hitparade)	32

=== Year-end charts ===
Chart (1996)	Position
German Albums (Offizielle Top 100)	87

== Certifications ==
Region	Certification	Certified units/sales
Austria (IFPI Austria)	Gold	25,000^{*}
Germany (BVMI)	Platinum	500,000^{^}
^{*} Sales figures based on certification alone.^{^} Shipments figures based on certification alone.
