= Gehasst, verdammt, vergöttert ... die letzten Jahre =

Gehasst, verdammt, vergöttert

Greatest hits album by Böhse Onkelz
- Released: 31 October 1994
- Recorded: 1991–1994
- Genre: Rock
- Length: 67:29 (CD 1); 15:38 (CD 2)
- Label: Bellaphon Records
- Producer: Böhse Onkelz

Böhse Onkelz chronology
Weiß & Schwarz	Gehasst, verdammt, vergöttert	Hier sind die Onkelz

Gehasst, verdammt, vergöttert ... die letzten Jahre (lit. "Hated, doomed and adored ... the last years") is the first best-of album of the German rock band Böhse Onkelz.

== Critical reception ==
The album was reviewed by Metal Hammer and Rock Hard.

== Track listing ==
CD 1
No.	Title	Length
1.	"Lieber Stehend Sterben"	3:58
2.	"Gehasst, Verdammt, Vergöttert"	3:05
3.	"Wir Ham' Noch Lange Nicht Genug"	4:42
4.	"Ich Bin In Di"	3:51
5.	"Mexico"	2:50
6.	"Heilige Lieder"	4:44
7.	"Wenn Wir Einmal Engel Sind"	3:59
8.	"Wieder Mal 'Nen Tag Verschenkt"	4:06
9.	"Scheissegal"	2:36
10.	"Schöne Neue Welt"	4:36
11.	"Nur Die Besten Sterben Jung"	3:56
12.	"Ich Lieb' Mich"	1:23
13.	"Erinnerungen"	4:23
14.	"Deutschland Im Herbst"	4:33
15.	"Für Immer"	5:36
16.	"Ich Bin Wie Ich Bin"	4:47
17.	"Die Böhsen Onkelz Geben Sich Die Ehre (Unveröffentlicht)"	4:24
Total length:		67:29

CD 2
No.	Title	Length
18.	"Worte Der Freiheit"	5:40
19.	"Nenn' Mich Wie Du Willst"	3:28
20.	"Entfache Dieses Feuer"	3:14
21.	"Das Ist Mein Leben"	3:16
Total length:		15:38

== Charts ==
Weekly chart performance
Chart (1994–1995)	Peak position
Austrian Albums (Ö3 Austria)	13
German Albums (Offizielle Top 100)	47
Swiss Albums (Schweizer Hitparade)	36
