= Heilige Lieder =

Studio album by Böhse Onkelz
- Released: 31 August 1992
- Recorded: 1992
- Genre: Hard rock
- Length: 59:23
- Label: Bellaphon Records
- Producer: Böhse Onkelz

Böhse Onkelz chronology
Wir ham' noch lange nicht genug (1991)	Heilige Lieder (1992)	Weiß (1993)

Single cover

Heilige Lieder is the ninth studio album by German rock band Böhse Onkelz, released 1992 through Bellaphon Records.

== Critical reception ==
Professional ratings
Review scores
Source	Rating
Rock Hard	8.5/10

In 2005, the album was ranked number 360 in Rock Hard magazine's book The 500 Greatest Rock & Metal Albums of All Time.

== Track listing ==
No.	Title	Length
1.	"Intro Oratorium"	1:31
2.	"Heilige Lieder"	4:44
3.	"Buch der Erinnerung"	4:37
4.	"Nenn' mich wie du willst"	4:22
5.	"Ich bin in dir"	3:51
6.	"Scheißegal"	2:36
7.	"Diese Lieder"	5:11
8.	"Gestern war heute noch morgen"	3:49
9.	"Schließe deine Augen (und sag mir was du siehst)"	5:28
10.	"Gehasst, verdammt, vergöttert"	3:06
11.	"Ein langer Weg"	4:20
12.	"Noreia"	3:24
13.	"Der Schrei nach Freiheit"	3:45
14.	"Angst ist nur ein Gefühl"	4:38
15.	"Wir schreiben Geschichte"	4:01

== Track notes ==
=== "Scheißegal" ===
The song deals with what is actually legal and what is illegal to do in today's society with regard to other people's reactions toward your actions. Scheißegal, meaning something like I don't give a shit, sung by the band deals with the fact that today you are bound to certain behaviours in our society and that you have to act in such way you can be accepted as a member of it. The band tries to tell the audience that they do not care about what people think about their actions and that this behaviour is not right.

== Charts ==
Chart (1992)	Peak position
Austrian Albums (Ö3 Austria)	7
German Albums (Offizielle Top 100)	5

== Certifications ==
Region	Certification	Certified units/sales
Germany (BVMI)	Gold	250,000^{^}
^{^} Shipments figures based on certification alone.
