= Viva los tioz =

Studio album by Böhse Onkelz
- Released: 4 September 1998
- Recorded: 1998
- Genre: Hard rock
- Length: 67:01
- Label: Virgin Schallplatten
- Producer: Böhse Onkelz

Böhse Onkelz chronology
Live in Dortmund	Viva los tioz	Ein böses Märchen

Professional ratings
Review scores
Source	Rating
Rock Hard	(8.5/10)

Viva los tioz (Spanish for Long Live the Unclez) is the 13th album by German rock band Böhse Onkelz. It was released in 1998 and within 48 hours reached number one in the Media Control Charts.

== Track listing ==
1. "Matapalo - Parte uno"
2. "Viva los Tioz" (Long Live the Unclez)
3. "Leere Worte" (Empty Words)
4. "Weit weg" (Far Away)
5. "Das Geheimnis meiner Kraft" (The Secret of My Strength)
6. "Scheisse passiert" (Shit Happens)
7. "Terpentin" (Turpentine)
8. "Ohne mich" (Without Me)
9. "Der Platz neben mir - Part 1+2" (The Place Next to Me)
10. "Der Preis des Lebens" (The Price of Life)
11. "Bin ich nur glücklich, wenn es schmerzt?" (Am I Only Happy When It Hurts)
12. "Wenn du wirklich willst" (If You Really Want)
13. "Matapalo - Parte dos"

== Track notes ==
=== Matapalo - Parte uno ===
Instrumental introduction, which ends with a message in Spanish from the movie "Mars Attacks". This part is spoken by the spanish voice actor of Jack Nicholson.

"Buenas tardes conciudadanos americanos! Perdonenme por interruptir sus progamas favoritos, pero debo de hacer una declaracion de la mayor importancia. En mi vida me han pasado muchas cosas importantes, viviendo un momento historico. No solo para mi, sino para toda la humanidad..."
"Good evening fellow American citizens! Please forgive me for interrupting your favorite programs, but I have a very important message for you. In my life many important things have happened to me, and now I’m experiencing a historical moment. Not only for me, but for all mankind..."

=== Terpentin ===
This song was covered by Pro-Pain for their album Run for Cover.

=== Ohne mich ===
The Onkelz always had to justify themselves. The message of this song is that extremism (right-wing or left-wing) cannot be the right way.

=== Matapalo - Parte dos ===
This instrumental is the continuation of the intro. It begins with a message from Pozo, a friend of the band and ends in instrumental sound. The message is:

"Tu puedes arriesgarlo todo por algo, que incluso no entiendes cuando lo tienes. Algunos piensan que pueden medirte por tus enemigos. Si fuese así, respetados debemos ser"
"You can risk it all for something you don't even understand when you have it. Some think you can be judged from your enemies. If that is so, we should be respected."

== Single ==
=== Terpentin ===
==== Track listing ====
1. "Terpentin"
2. "Weit weg"
3. "11/97" (instrumental)

== Charts ==
Chart (1998)	Peak position
Austrian Albums (Ö3 Austria)	3
German Albums (Offizielle Top 100)	1
Swiss Albums (Schweizer Hitparade)	10

== Certifications ==
Region	Certification	Certified units/sales
Austria (IFPI Austria)	Gold	25,000^{*}
Germany (BVMI)	Gold	250,000^{^}
^{*} Sales figures based on certification alone.^{^} Shipments figures based on certification alone.
