= Mexico (EP) =

EP by Böhse Onkelz
- Released: 1985
- Recorded: 1985
- Genre: Oi!, ska, hardcore punk
- Length: 22:31
- Label: Rock-O-Rama
- Producer: Böhse Onkelz

Böhse Onkelz chronology
Böse Menschen - Böse Lieder	Mexico	Onkelz wie wir...

Mexico is an EP and the third album by German rock band Böhse Onkelz. It was released in 1985. After Mexico, the band left Rock-O-Rama and the skinhead attitude.

== Track listing ==
1. "Mexico"
2. "Das Tier in mir" (The animal inside of me)
3. "Stöckel & Strapse" (Stilettos and hats)
4. "In jedem Arm ne..." (In every arm a ...)
5. "Gesetze der Straße" (Laws of the Street)

== Track notes ==
=== Mexico ===
After "Frankreich '84" was embargoed, the band wrote a new song for the 1986 FIFA World Cup. "Señoritas in arm, Tequila lukewarm / troubled by diarrhea and hunted by flies / In the land of the cactus, we will be - you will see - world champion, world champion again." Mexico is one of the biggest countries. The song is often sung by German soccer fans by matches, so for example at the World Cup match of Germany vs. Sweden in 2006.

=== Stolz (schnelle Version) (Pride - fast version) ===
This song is the same as on the album Der nette Mann, but it's a harder and faster version.

=== Stöckel & Strapse ===
A song about sex - they won't it "normal".

=== In jedem Arm ne... ===
"In every arm a woman" is the full title.

=== Gesetze der Straße ===
A song about violence on the street.

== Charts ==
2026 chart performance for Mexico
Chart (2026)	Peak position
German Albums (Offizielle Top 100)	2
German Rock & Metal Albums (Offizielle Top 100)	2
