= Adios (Böhse Onkelz album) =

Studio album by Böhse Onkelz
- Released: 26 July 2004
- Recorded: 2004
- Genre: Hard rock
- Length: 56:56
- Label: Rule23
- Producer: Die Gestalten

Böhse Onkelz chronology
Dopamin (2002)	Adios (2004)	Live in Hamburg (2005)

Professional ratings
Review scores
Source	Rating
laut.de	4/5 stars
Rock Hard	8.5/10
CDStarts.de	6.0/10

Adios is the sixteenth studio album by German rock band Böhse Onkelz. It was released in 2004.

In 2005, the album was ranked number 393 in Rock Hard magazine's book of "The 500 Greatest Rock & Metal Albums of All Time".

== Track listing ==
No.	Title	Length
1.	"Feuer"	3:34
2.	"Immer auf der Suche"	2:58
3.	"Superstar"	2:29
4.	"Sowas hat man"	5:00
5.	"Ja, ja"	3:35
6.	"Lass mich gehn"	4:01
7.	"Fang mich"	2:46
8.	"Einmal"	4:20
9.	"Kinder dieser Zeit"	3:04
10.	"Hass-tler"	4:23
11.	"Onkelz vs. Jesus"	3:29
12.	"Überstimuliert"	3:58
13.	"Prinz Valium"	2:47
14.	"Ihr hättet es wissen müssen"	5:21
15.	"A.D.I.O.Z." (instrumental)	5:11

== Track notes ==
=== Superstar ===
A song criticizing the pop music talent shows in television like Popstars or Deutschland sucht den Superstar (the German version of American Idol).

=== Ja, Ja ===
Refers to an idiom, which means "Kiss my ass".

=== Kinder dieser Zeit ===
Whether hip hop, metal or other fans - all should stand united.

=== Hass-tler ===
The title is a wordplay from Hass (Hate) and Hitler. "You are the Hass-tler: Paranoid and confused / You are the Hass-tler: One time pierced through brain"

=== Onkelz vs. Jesus ===
A song about their wrong confidence being more famous than Jesus.

== Singles ==
=== Track listing ===
1. Onkelz vs. Jesus
2. Superstar
3. My Generation (The Who cover)
4. Prinz Valium (instrumental)

== Charts ==
=== Weekly charts ===
Chart (2004)	Peak position
Austrian Albums (Ö3 Austria)	6
German Albums (Offizielle Top 100)	1
Swiss Albums (Schweizer Hitparade)	4

=== Year-end charts ===
Chart (2004)	Position
German Albums (Offizielle Top 100)	11

== Certifications ==
Region	Certification	Certified units/sales
Germany (BVMI)	Platinum	200,000^{^}
^{^} Shipments figures based on certification alone.
