= Kneipenterroristen =

Studio album by Böhse Onkelz
- Released: 10 October 1988
- Recorded: 1988
- Genre: Hard rock
- Length: 39:34
- Label: Metal Enterprises
- Producer: Böhse Onkelz and Ingo Nowotny

Böhse Onkelz chronology
Onkelz wie wir...	Kneipenterroristen	Lügenmarsch

Kneipenterroristen (German for Pub Terrorists) is the fifth album by German rock band Böhse Onkelz. It was released in 1988.

== Track listing ==
1. Kneipenterroristen (Pub Terrorists)
2. Religion
3. Lack + Leder (Lacquer and Leather)
4. So sind wir (That's How We Are )
5. Tanz der Teufel (Dance of the Devils)
6. 28
7. Guten Tag (Good Day; or here: Have a Nice Day)
8. Nie wieder (Never Again)
9. Freddy Krüger
10. Ein guter Freund (A Good Friend)

== Track notes ==
=== Kneipenterroristen ===
A song about vandalism and "terrorism" in taverns and pubs.

=== Religion ===
The band condemn religion in this song, because wars were led and humans were burned in its name.

=== So sind wir ===
A song, which glorifies the band. "That's how we are, and that is our life / what could be better than to be an Onkel (uncle)"

=== 28 ===
Singer Kevin lived this time in Frankfurt in an appartement in the Weberstraße 28. There were celebrated wild parties and consumed drugs. Gonzo and Stephan wanted to catch the heights and depths in this appartement into an instrumental song, which became the house number as title.

=== Nie wieder ===
Some friends of the band went to jail. The Onkelz didn't want to go this way and wrote a song about it.

=== Freddy Krüger ===
A song about the singers "good friend" Freddy Krüger.

=== Ein guter Freund ===
Cover version of the same-named song by Heinz Rühmann, Willy Fritsch and Oskar Karlweis from 1930. This song is only included on CD as a bonus track.

== Charts ==
Chart (2018)	Peak position
Austrian Albums (Ö3 Austria)	18
German Albums (Offizielle Top 100)	3
Swiss Albums (Schweizer Hitparade)	45
