= Stephan Weidner =

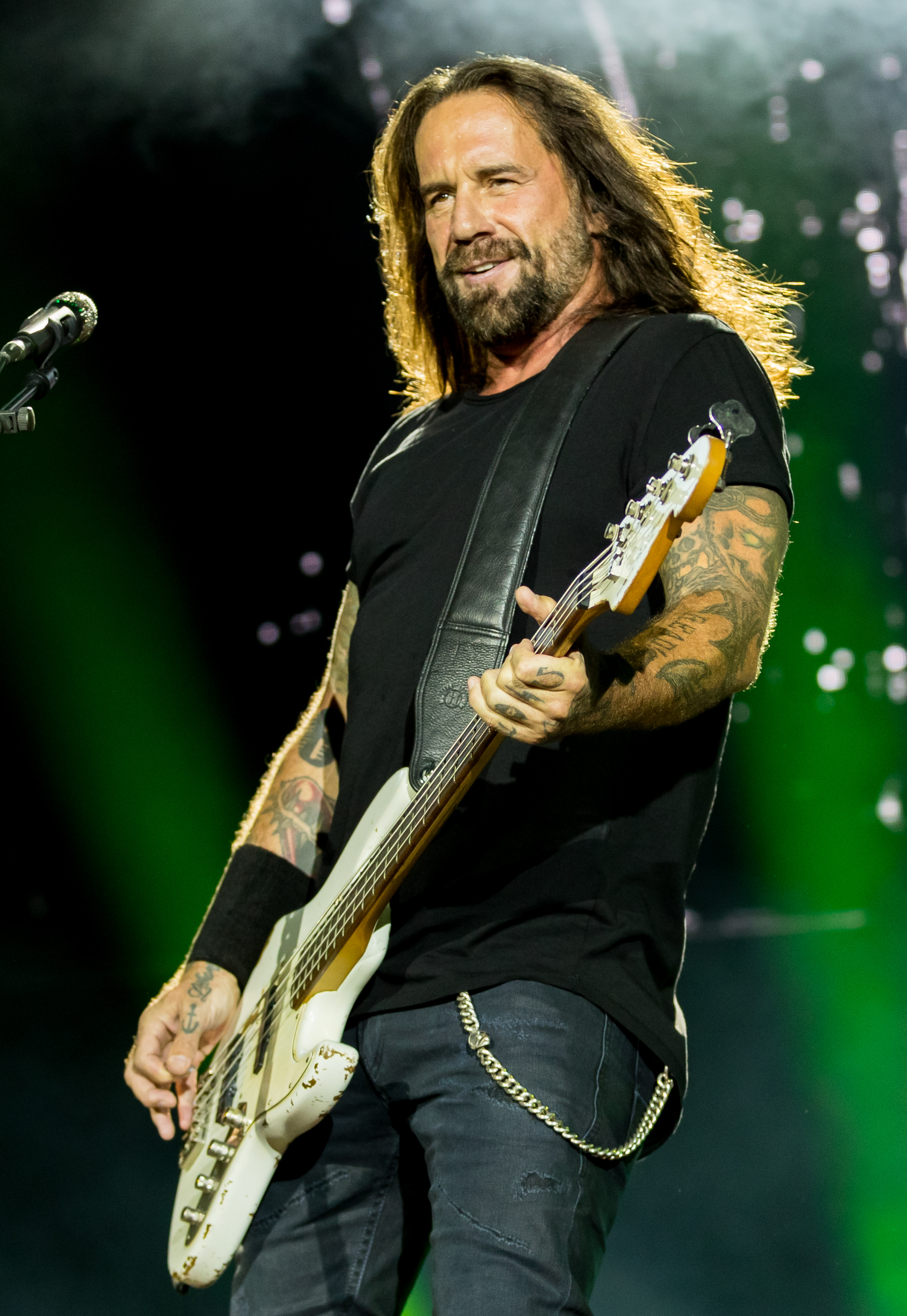
- Weidner in 2019

Background information
- Also known as: Der W
- Born: 29 May 1963 (age 62); Alsfeld, West Germany (now Germany)
- Genres: Hard rock
- Occupations: Musician, songwriter, producer
- Instruments: Bass, vocals
- Years active: 1980–present
- Label: Rule23 Recordings
- Formerly of: Böhse Onkelz; Nordend Antistars
- Website: www.der-w.de

Stephan Weidner (born 29 May 1963), also known as Der W, is a German musician, songwriter and producer. From 1980 to 2005, he was the bassist, songwriter and leader of the German rock band Böhse Onkelz. He was also a singer with Nordend Antistars, a collaboration with Sub7even singer Daniel Wirtz. In April 2008, Weidner's first solo album Schneller, Höher, Weidner was released.

== Early life ==
Weidner was raised by his father Tex Weidner with two half brothers and two sisters in an impoverished family. Conflicts with a school principal resulted in Weidner being banned from school. His father then moved the family to Hösbach near Aschaffenburg in Bavaria. There Weidner first met the musicians (Kevin Russell and Peter "Pe" Schorowsky) who would later become the first line-up for Weidner's band, Böhse Onkelz. Weidner failed to graduate and subsequently did not pursue a career, instead taking a variety of odd-jobs including working as a bartender in a tavern connected to a brothel owned by Weidner's father.

== Musical career ==
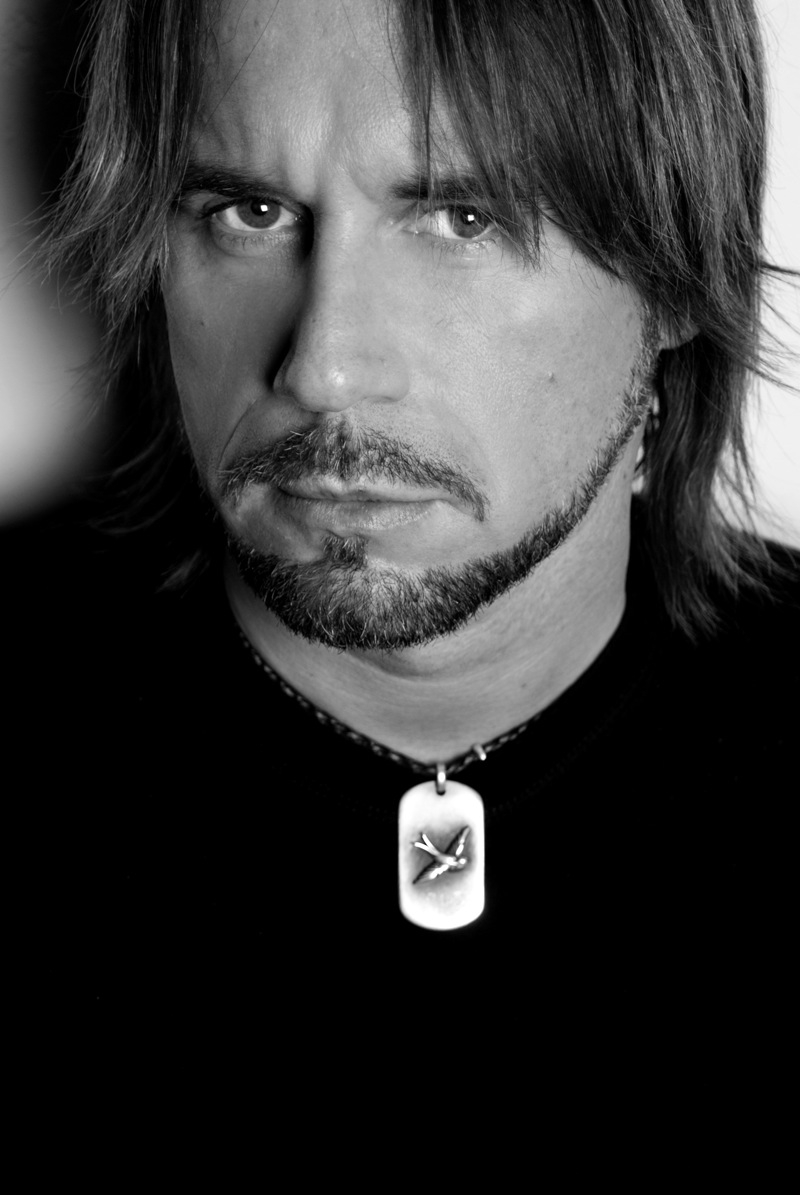
Weidner in 2009

=== Böhse Onkelz ===
In 1980, the 17-year-old Weidner founded the band Böhse Onkelz ("Evil Uncles") with Kevin Russell and Peter "Pe" Schorowsky. Weidner initially played guitar in the band. After Matthias "Gonzo" Röhr joined the band, Weidner moved to the bass. The band modeled itself as a Nazi-Skin band. Weidner particularly felt a connection to the Oi!-punk movement, but also to the original, political skinhead and hooligan movements that had come to Germany from England early in the 1980s. This inspiration expressed itself in Weidner's songs with lyrics that often glorified violence, racism and the use of force. Conflicts with Punks and Antifascists nationwide, local Turkish residents and the increasing right-wing shift of the skinhead movement were reflected in the band's music, leading to xenophobic lyrics and the band's subsequent popularity with those movements.

In 1983, Weidner married and struggled to find work. The first commercial releases of Böhse Onkelz earned little money. Their first album Der nette Mann was banned in Germany. For the album Böse Menschen – Böse Lieder, the band never received any money. Meanwhile, they continued to break way from the skinhead movement due to the increasingly restrictive dress codes and regulations associated with those movements, particularly as those trends conflicted with the sense of freedom embraced by the punk movement.

Weidner's lyrics continued to grow musically. In the song "Erinnerung" he expressed his feelings about his earlier life. Nonetheless, his reputation as a "right-wing skinhead rocker" remained. Weidner remained faithful to his influences both musically and in his lifestyle, as expressed in his writings and interviews with the press. This attitude often led to conflicts with the press. His refusal to rename the band was seen as a sign that Böhse Onkelz had not done enough to clearly distance itself enough from the skinhead movement. This conflict with the media culminated in songs such as "Meister der Lügen" (Master of Lies) or "Danke für nichts" (Thanks for Nothing). Weidner's refusal to give interviews outside of the music press at that time is part of the "mythos Onkelz".

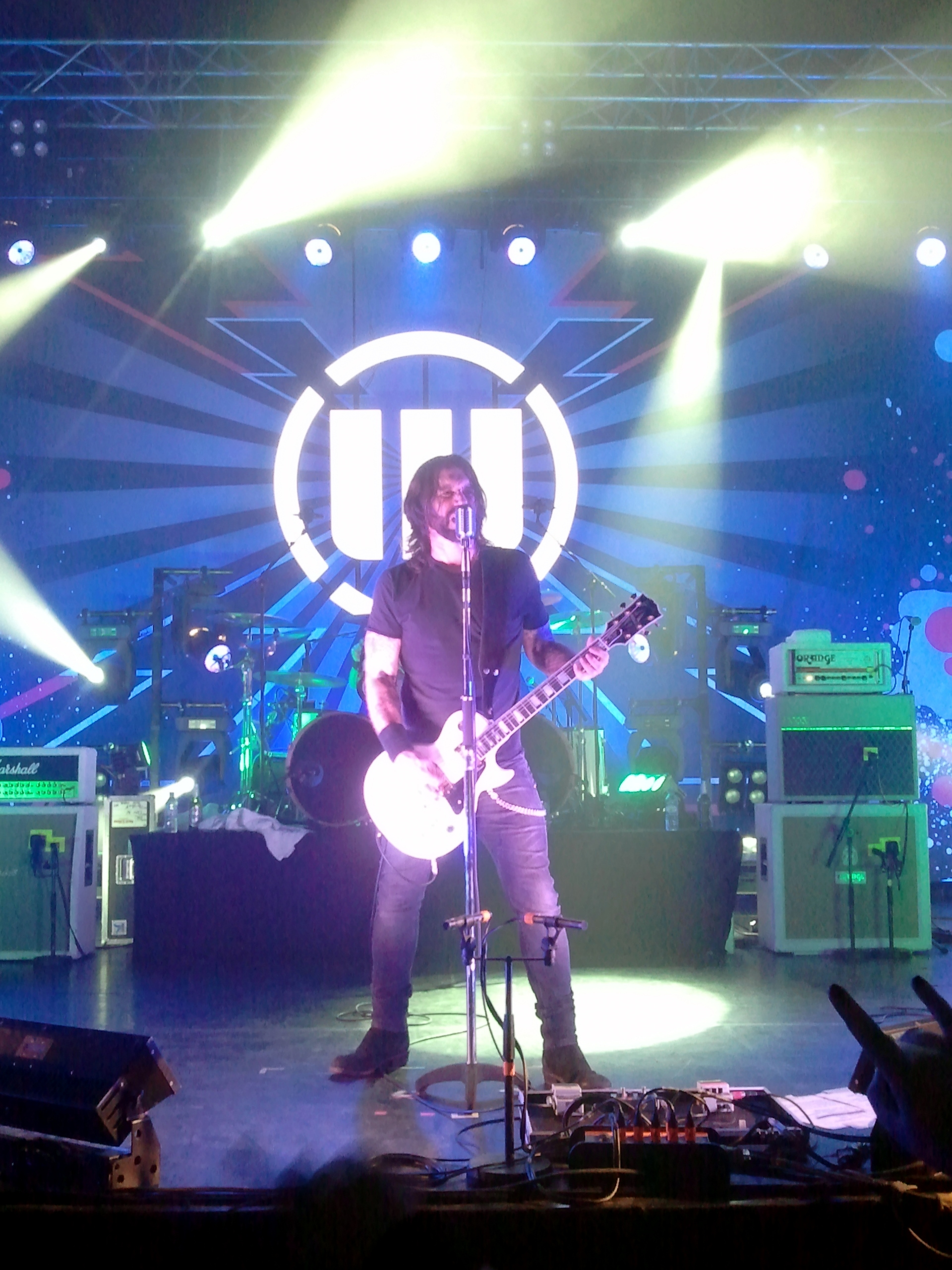
Weidner performing in 2013

In 1993, at MTV's "Free Your Mind" event, Weidner and Campino (of the band Die Toten Hosen) discussed the influence of xenophobia on their music and their fans. Though the public was skeptical of Weidner's reform, his success continued to increase. After a gig with the Rolling Stones at Hanover in 2003, Weidner stated that he would not spend his old age on the stage. In 2005, Böhse Onkelz split up. In 2014, they made their comeback in front of 400,000 people.

=== Nordend Antistars ===
On 15 May 2006, Weidner (along with Daniel Wirtz of Sub7even) released the songs Unser Stadion – Unsere Regeln ("Our Stadium – Our Rules") and Gewinnen kann jeder ("Anyone Can Win") under the band name Nordend Antistars as arena anthems for the 2006 FIFA World Cup.

=== Guest musician ===
Weidner has been a guest artist on a number of tracks from other bands:

- He played bass on Dance 2 Trance's "Remember Exxon Valdez" from the album Moon Spirits (1992)
- He provides background vocals on Pro-Pain's "Godspeed" from the album Fistful of Hate (2004)
- He provides background vocals on Sub7even's "F *** About" on the album Lovechainsnrockets (2006)
- He sings the refrain on Pro-Pain's "Hour of the Time" from the album No End in Sight (2008)

=== Solo career as 'Der W' ===
On 25 April 2008, Weidner released his first solo album Schneller, Höher, Weidner ("Faster, Higher, Weidner"), for which he recorded some songs with American heavy metal band Pro-Pain. From March 2009 until April 2009, he toured Germany, Austria and Switzerland to promote this album. Opening acts included Pro-Pain, Danish rock band D-A-D, and German rock band Skew Siskin.

For his live performance, Weidner's band consisted of Rupert Keplinger, Dirk Czuya, Henning Menke and JC Dwyer.

=== Producer ===
In addition to producing for Böhse Onkelz, Weidner also produced for:

- 2000: Suprasod: Suprasod
- 2006: Nordend Antistars: Unser Stadion, unsere Regeln (single)
- 2006: Sub7even: Lovechainsnrockets
- 2009: Eschenbach: Eschenbach

== Personal life ==
Weidner was married and has two children (a son and a daughter). He currently lives in Portugal and Ibiza, Spain.

In addition to his music projects, Weidner also designs clothes. He aims to create fashion with subtle messages that help the wearer to express his or her own style. The clothes (criticized as being overly expensive as compared to similar clothing lines) are sold through an online store called W Couture.

== Discography ==
=== Albums ===
- 2008: Schneller, höher, Weidner (Faster, Higher, Weidner)
- 2010: Autonomie! (Autonomy!)
- 2012: III
- 2016: IV
- 2022: V

=== Singles ===
- 2008: "Geschichtenhasser" (Story Hater)
- 2010: "Sterne" (Stars)
- 2011: "Was ist denn hier nicht los?" (What Is Not Going On Here?)

== Awards ==
- 2009: Echo nomination: Artist / Artist / Group of the Year Rock / Alternative (National)
