= Der nette Mann =

Studio album by Böhse Onkelz
- Released: 1984
- Recorded: 1984
- Genre: Oi!, ska, hardcore punk
- Length: 37:11; 29:12 (2020 reissue)
- Label: Rock-O-Rama
- Producer: Böhse Onkelz and Herbert Egoldt

Böhse Onkelz chronology
Der nette Mann	Böse Menschen – Böse Lieder

Der nette Mann (German for "The nice man") is the debut album by German rock band Böhse Onkelz. It was released in 1984. Der nette Mann is considered the first album of the German skinhead subculture.

In August 1986 six of its 14 tracks were deemed to either promote violence (Fußball und Gewalt, Der nette Mann, Dr. Martens Beat), Nazi-ideology (Frankreich '84, Böhse Onkelz) or pornography (Mädchen) by the German Federal Department for Media Harmful to Young Persons (which means, it is not to be sold to minors, not to be put on public display, not to be advertised).

Shortly after the 'indexing', the album was additionally embargoed due to purported "glorification of violence" in its lyrics, making it altogether illegal to sell the album in Germany. As of today, this decision ceased to come into effect, the indexing still stands.

Original copies of the album (2,000 were sold) are regarded as rarities and have a value of more than €350.

In 1988 Rock-O-Rama re-released the album without permission by the band under the new title Freitag Nacht without the indexed tracks.

In 2019, the band asked the Federal Department for Media Harmful to Young Persons for a re-examination of the album and in December 2019 three songs (Der nette Mann, Mädchen, Böhse Onkelz) were taken off the index.

On 28 December 2020, the album was officially reissued for the first time as part of the group's Onkelz: 40 Jahre boxset, albeit omitting the tracks "Frankreich '84", "Fussball + Gewalt" and "Dr. Martens Beat", after the Onkelz lobbied to have the album removed from the Index. This new version of the album is called Der nette Mann von nebenan (The nice man from next door).

== Track listing ==
1. Frankreich '84 (France '84)
2. Fußball + Gewalt (Soccer and Violence)
3. Der nette Mann (The Nice Man)
4. Deutschland (Germany)
5. Singen und Tanzen (Singing and Dancing)
6. Mädchen (Girl)
7. Tanz auf deinem Grab (Dance on Your Grave)
8. Dr. Martens Beat
9. Vereint (United)
10. Freibier (Free Beer)
11. Stolz (Pride)
12. Freitag Nacht (Friday Night)
13. Böhse Onkelz
14. Alkohol (Alcohol)

== Track notes ==
=== Frankreich '84' ===
This song's theme is the UEFA Euro 1984 in France. The band indeed had tickets to some of the games, but got into trouble with the French border police.

"Frankreich '84" was one of the tracks, because of which the whole album was embargoed. The term "Frankreichüberfall" (France Assault i.e. assault on France), is reminiscent of the German attack on France in World War II. The Bundesprüfstelle für jugendgefährdende Schriften (German Federal Department for Media Harmful to Young Persons) concluded that "Frankreich '84 is forcing violence and glorifying the Nazi regime" and is demeaning to the French national team and supports Nazi tendencies.

=== Fußball + Gewalt ===
This song is about the battles between football hooligans.

=== Der nette Mann ===
This track is concerned with child abuse, told from the perspective of the criminal himself. "Ich bin der nette Mann von nebenan, und jeder könnt' es sein. Schaut mich an, schaut mich an, ich bin das perverse Schwein." ("I am the nice man from next door / and everyone could it be / Look at me, look at me / I am the pervert pig"). Although the band intended the song as a statement against child molesters, the Bundesprüfstelle reached the conclusion, that its lyrics propagate violence towards children. Nevertheless, the band performed this song until their dissolution on several concerts, deliberately facing paying hefty fines each time.

=== Deutschland ===
This is an over-patriotic song. The Böhse Onkelz were - so they say - unpolitical skinheads at this time. "Deutschland" begins with the lines "Auch zwölf dunkle Jahre in deiner Geschichte macht unsre Verbundenheit mit dir nicht zunichte. Es gibt kein Land frei von Dreck und Scherben, hier sind wir geboren, hier wollen wir sterben" ("Also twelve dark years in your history destroyed not our solidarity to you / There's no state free from dirt and debris. Here are we born, here we want to die."). Critics state, that this is in fact a deliberate belittlement of the Nazi years.

At a concert in Lübeck in 1985 singer Kevin changed the lyrics to "Schwarz-Weiß-Rot wir stehn zu dir" (Black-white-red, we stand to you) instead of "Schwarz-Rot-Gold wir stehn zu dir" (Black-red-gold, we stand to you), with the former being the colours of the banned Reichskriegsflagge as opposed to the official federal German flag. The rest of the band allegedly distanced itself from the singer and the changed lyrics after the concert (although they claimed this years after the incident).

=== Mädchen ===
This song was deemed sexist. "Mädchen, Mädchen, komm und spreiz die Beine / Mädchen, Mädchen, du weißt schon, was ich meine" ("Girl, girl, come and spread your legs / girl, girl, you know what I mean") and "Mädchen, Mädchen, nimm ihn in den Mund" ("Girl, girl, take it in your mouth") are some examples. "Mädchen" was another factor in the embargo because of the "pornographic content" of these lyrics.

=== Dr. Martens Beat ===
Also a contributing factor to the album being embargoed. According to the Bundesprüfstelle the song supports and propagates violence. Doc Martens are shoes with steel caps, mostly worn by skinheads by this time. One example of this song's lyrics: "Dr. Martens Beat, Dr. Martens Beat / Der Klang einer Stahlkappe, die dich in der Fresse trifft." ("Doc Martens beat, Doc Martens beat / The sound of a steel cap hitting your trap.")

=== Stolz ===
The song describes the subculture of the skinheads and the living with it.

=== Böhse Onkelz ===
The band says, with this song they wanted to glorify themselves. "Wir trinken mit links und herrschen mit der rechten / Wir sind die Herrscher Frankfurts, Könige der Nacht" ("We drink with left, and rule with the right / We are the ruler of Frankfurt, kings of the night.") Because of the line "Wir sind Böhse Onkelz und machen, was uns gefällt / Heute gehört uns Deutschland, morgen die ganze Welt ("We are Böhse Onkelz and do what we want / Today we rule Germany, and tomorrow the whole world) this song was a contributing factor to the album being embargoed. The Bundesprüfstelle detected a glorification of Nazi-ideology.
