= Böhse Onkelz =

German rock band

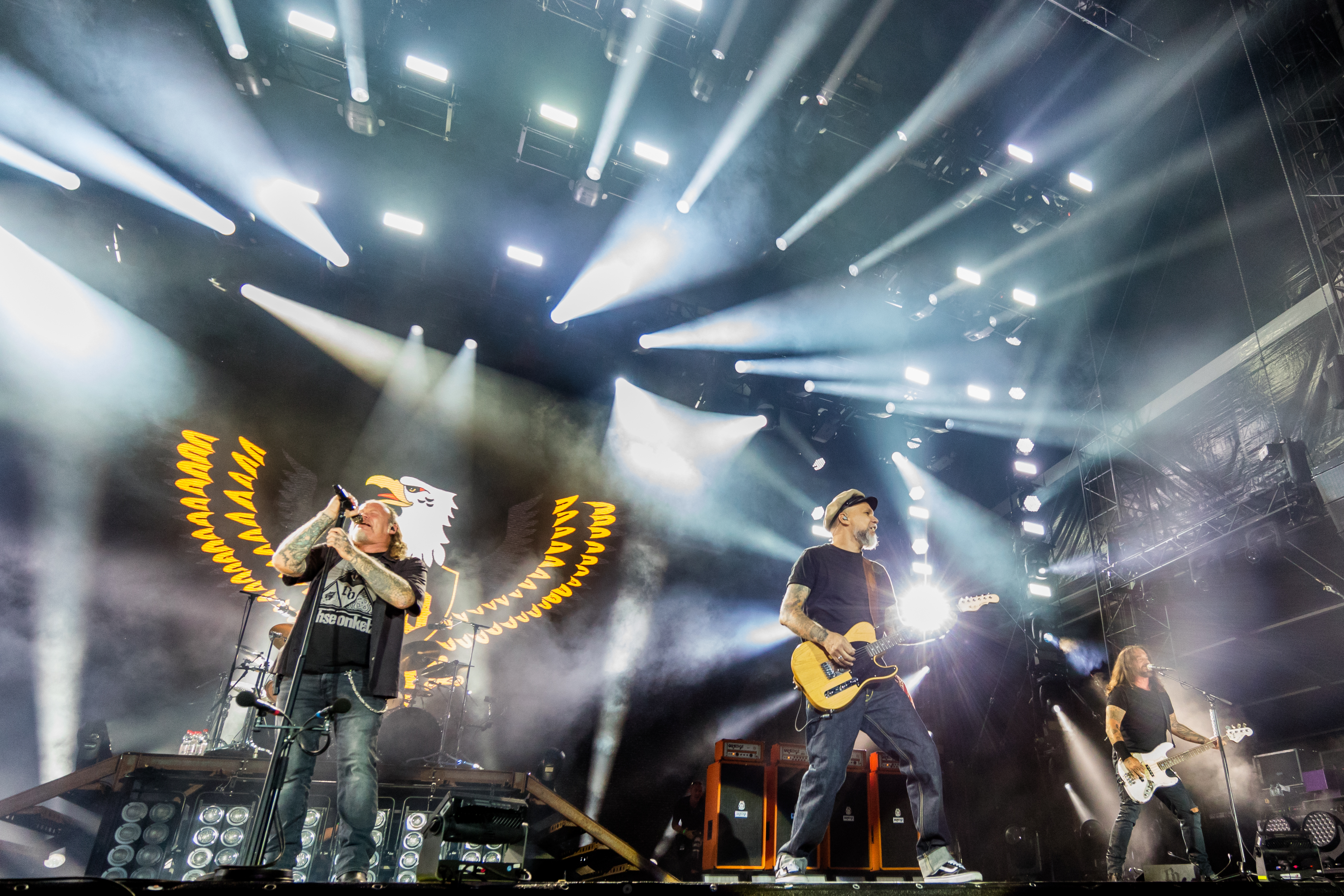
- Böhse Onkelz performing in 2019

Background information
- Origin: Frankfurt, Germany
- Genres: Hard rock, German rock Early: Punk, Oi!
- Years active: 1980–2005, 2014–present
- Labels: Rock-O-Rama (1984–1986); Metal Enterprises (1987–1990); Bellaphon Records (1991–1994); Virgin Records (1995–2000) rule23 Recordings (2000–2005)
- Members: Stephan "Der W" Weidner; Kevin Russell; Peter "Pe" Schorowsky; Matthias "Gonzo" Röhr
- Website: onkelz.de

Böhse Onkelz (German pronunciation: [ˈbøːzə ˈʔɔŋkl̩ts]; sensational spelling of böse Onkel; German for "evil uncles") is a German rock band formed in Frankfurt in 1980 and initially active until 2005. The band reunited in 2014. Despite mass-media criticism concerning their past as skinheads, several of their later records topped the German album charts (selling over 5,338,000 records and 425,000 videos or DVDs). E.I.N.S., released in 1996, was their most successful album, with over 510,000 sales.

== History ==
=== 1980–1981: Founding ===
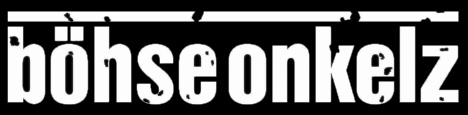
The band logo

Inspired by bands like the Sex Pistols and the Ramones, Böhse Onkelz began in November 1980 in Hösbach as a punk rock band. Founding members were Stephan "Der W" Weidner, Kevin Russell and Peter "Pe" Schorowsky. According to the official band biography, its name originated when teenagers in their neighbourhood warned their younger siblings about them with the words Vorsicht, da sind die bösen Onkels! Their name was an intentionally incorrect spelling of "evil uncles" (böse Onkel). Before that, they called themselves "Beulenpest" (bubonic plague) for two weeks (as seen on the Tour 2000 film). Initially, the band played primarily in the Frankfurt am Main area.

Böhse Onkelz maintained its initial lineup until Matthias Röhr (nicknamed "Gonzo", after the Ted Nugent album of the same name) joined them in 1981. Musically he was the most experienced of the group, having played guitar for six years and playing in other bands (such as Antikörper). Since Weidner played guitar, Matthias started out on bass; however, they switched instruments before their first recordings for the punk sampler Soundtracks zum Untergang 2.

=== 1981–1985: Skinhead scene ===
Soundtracks zum Untergang 2 (Soundtracks for the Downfall, Vol. 2) was a left-wing-oriented punk sampler, on which Böhse Onkelz featured in the band's first widely released recording. However, the movement behind that sampler - which at that time has been seen as being apolitical - moved further towards anarchism, so the band lost interest in that subculture. Football became more important in their lives, particularly the fights surrounding it.

The band initially considered itself part of the (originally nonpolitical) Oi! subgenre, but it made its first shift to the political right during the early 1980s. The album Der nette Mann was released in 1984 by the Rock-O-Rama label, which had left its punk roots behind and concentrated on records by neo-Nazi and far-right bands. This album was 'indexed' in September 1986 because of its (alleged) sexism and glorification of violence. The album also contained the patriotic songs "Stolz" ("Pride") and "Deutschland" ("Germany"), which endeared the band to the far-right scene. The album was followed by Böse Menschen – Böse Lieder in 1985. Shortly after the release of the Mexico EP in late 1985, the band split with Rock-O-Rama; it had been defrauded of royalties and was concerned about the growing far-right reputation of the label, which did not represent its viewpoint.

In 1985, Böhse Onkelz appeared in the TV movie Zagarbata by Tabea Blumenschein. The film was a ZDF co-production, directed by Christoph Dreher, about the skinhead and punk subcultures of the early 1980s.

=== 1986–1992: Banning and media attention ===
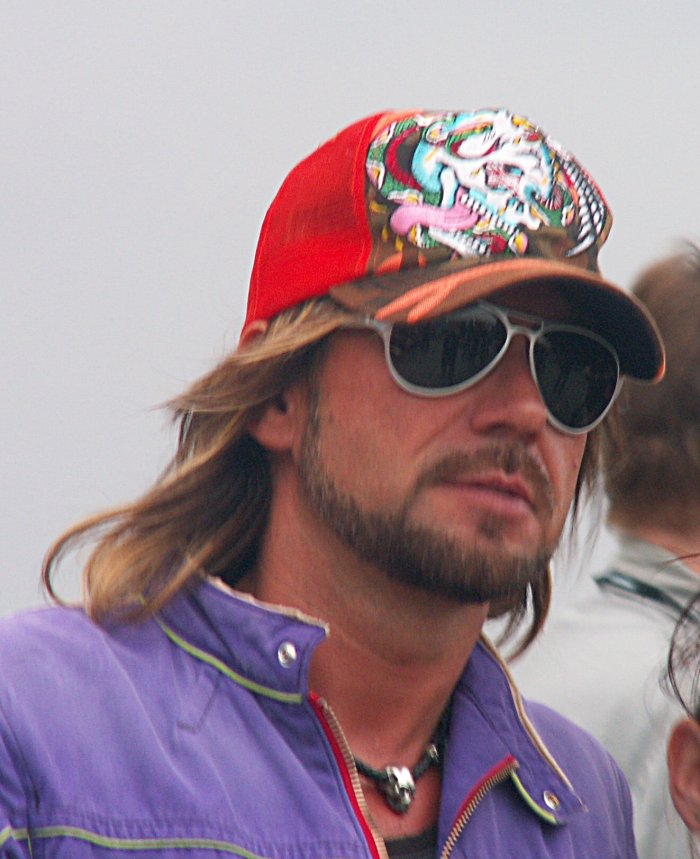
Stephan Weidner, songwriter, bassist and leader of the Onkelz

Apart from the indexing of Der nette Mann in 1986, things were calm around the band after its departure from the skinhead scene. After one charity concert, there were no live performances until 1989. In 1987 they released the album Onkelz wie wir..., followed by Kneipenterroristen in 1988. The albums contained songs about drinking and violence, but were richer musically and lyrically. Despite Russell's alcohol and heroin addictions, the band continued to work together. During this period the band was ignored by the media; however, this changed with the growing album sales of Es ist soweit, Wir ham’ noch lange nicht genug and Heilige Lieder.

On 16 June 1990 the band's best friend, Andreas "Trimmi" Trimborn, was stabbed to death during an incident at a bar in Frankfurt's Sachsenhausen district. Two days later, Böhse Onkelz supporters located the assailant: a Bundeswehr soldier whose father held high military rank. The killer was acquitted; the judge stated that Böhse Onkelz and its entourage were known to be violent, and the stabbing was committed in self-defense. Even today, all witnesses reject the claim that Trimmi threatened the killer and his companion (both of whom had allegedly snorted cocaine minutes before the incident). Russell fell into a deep depression over the loss of his friend, masking his grief with drugs and alcohol; his substance-abuse habits became so destructive that he almost died. The songs "Nur die besten sterben jung" ("Only the best die young") and "Der Platz neben mir" ("The place beside me") were written for Trimmi.

=== 1992–1997: Commercial success and criticism ===
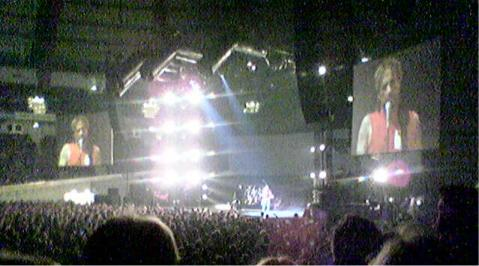
Onkelz on tour in 2004 (second Dortmund concert

In 1992, with no marketing, the album Heilige Lieder rose to No. 5 on the German LP charts. Despite its increasing commercial success, the band bore the stigma of being part of the right wing until its end. The Onkelz faced considerable criticism, which led to radio stations refusing to play their songs. Many observers did not believe that the band had "seen the light", considering their exit from the skinhead scene as a stratagem to avoid bans and prosecution. The band's reputation suffered, due to several poorly researched articles written about them. In response, Weidner wrote songs such as "Fahrt zur Hölle" ("Go to Hell") for Weiß and "Danke für nichts" ("Thanks for Nothing") for Hier sind die Onkelz (Here are the Onkelz).

Large department stores, such as Media Markt, World of Music (WOM) and Saturn, refused to sell their albums. By the end of the 1990s, however, Media Markt and WOM relented. Only Saturn refused to sell them until the band's final album, Adios in 2005 (which, with their other later albums, topped the charts for several weeks).

Since the early 1990s the Onkelz repeatedly took public positions against extremism of any kind, referring to themselves as outsiders with no political affiliation. In 1993, on their album Weiß (referring to the Riot of Rostock-Lichtenhagen), the band recorded its first song clearly disapproving of right-wing extremism: "Deutschland im Herbst" ("Germany in Autumn"). Singing about "braune Scheiße" ("brown scum") (referring to the colour of the NSDAP), "ich sehe blinden Hass, blinde Wut, feige Morde, Kinderblut" ("I see blind hatred, blind anger, cowardly murders, children's blood") and "blinde Parolen von Idioten und Verlierern" ("blind slogans from idiots and losers"). The song "Ohne mich" ("Without me") from their 1998 album Viva los Tioz speaks out against right- and left-wing extremism. The lyrics of the first verse argue that anti-fascists were, in fighting the band, not seeing their real enemy and were no better than fascists (at whom the second verse, which consists mostly of swearing, is directed). The band also acknowledges its past in the skinhead scene, singing: "Ihr seid dumm geboren, genau wie ich. Doch was ich lernte, lernt ihr nicht." ("You were born dumb just like me. But what I learned, you did not.")

In 1994 the band moved to Virgin Records (its first major label), for which they released the album Hier sind die Onkelz a year later; it reached No. 5 on the album charts. The 1996 album E.I.N.S. followed (No. 4 on the charts), and its title was interpreted by some in the media as Eigentlich immer noch Skins (In Fact, Still Skins). The album featured a song, "Enie Tfahcstob rüf Ediona-RAP", addressing this criticism. E.I.N.S was named in reader polls of music magazines (Rock Hard and Metal Hammer) one of the top 10 Best Metal Album of All Time (although it was not their best-seller). Since the mid-1990s, the band referred to their fans as "nephews" and "nieces", strengthening the communal spirit expressed in the song "Danke" from their album Ein böses Märchen...aus tausend finsteren Nächten.

In 1996, Böhse Onkelz recorded their second live album – Live in Dortmund – at the Dortmund Westfalenhalle.

=== 1997–2004: No. 1 on the charts ===
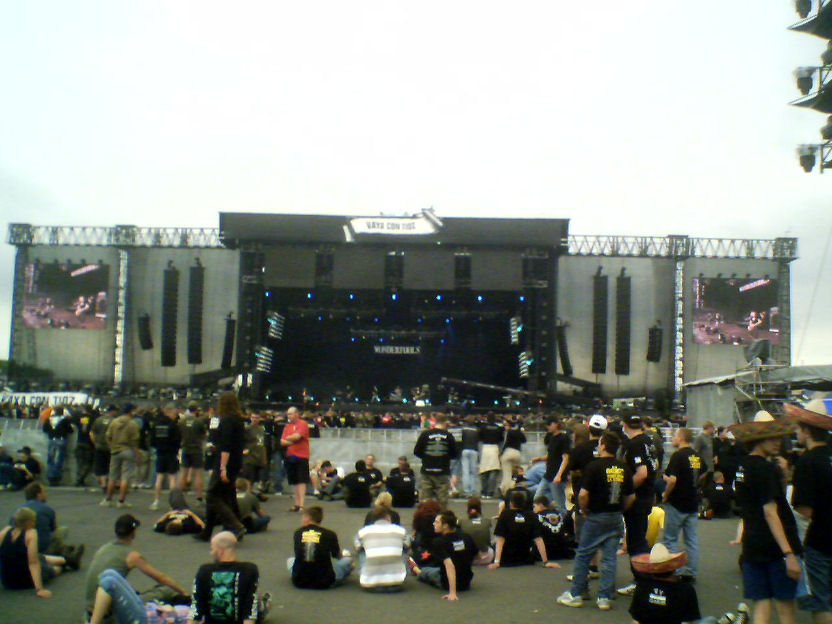
Supporting act Wonderfools at Vaya Con Tioz

The band has a large fan base, and is one of the most successful German music groups. In 1998, they sold about 300,000 copies of the album Viva los tioz within the first 48 hours after release. In 2000 they released Ein böses Märchen, their first album under their new record label (rule23 Recordings) and produced their first music video for the single "Dunkler Ort", which was broadcast on MTV. Later, an MTV Masters special about the Onkelz was made (which the band disliked). In 2002 they released the diss track "Keine Amnestie für MTV" ("No Amnesty for MTV"), indicating that they would never work together in the future. In 2002 the Onkelz released the album Dopamin, which was recorded on the Spanish island of Ibiza and mastered at Abbey Road Studios in London.

On 8 August 2003, despite negative publicity, the Böhse Onkelz were a supporting act for The Rolling Stones at their concert in the open-air arena at the Hanover Fairground. That year they played a club tour in Germany under their alias, "Los Tioz" (Spanish for "Die Onkelz").

=== 2004–2005: Disbandment ===
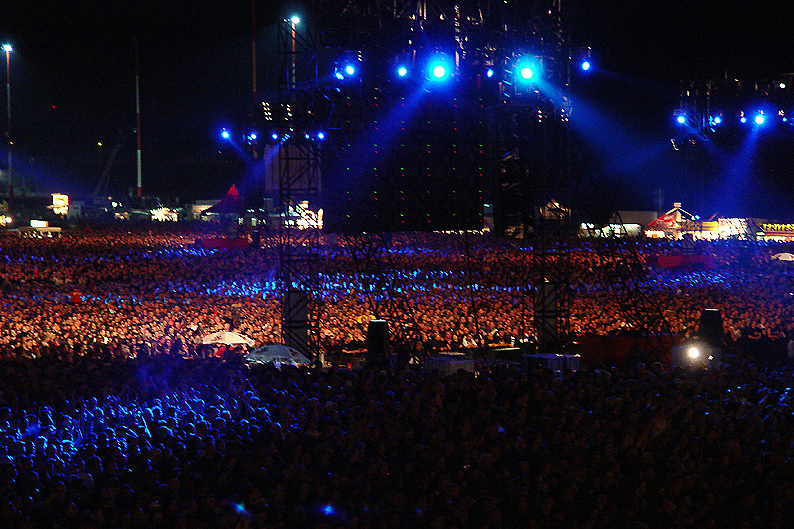
120,000 fans at final concert in Lausitzring, Germany

When the band's five-year contract with Virgin ended in 2003 they found a new distributor in SPV GmbH for their final album, Adios. On 24 May 2004 the Onkelz officially announced their retirement from the music business. After the release of the album, a performance at the Wacken Open Air in August 2004 and the sold-out "La Ultima" tour, their farewell show took place on 17 and 18 June 2005 at the EuroSpeedway Lausitz (in Lusatia, Brandenburg) under the name Vaya Con Tioz before an audience of approximately 120,000. It was the largest open-air show by a German band in history. Supporting bands included Motörhead, Machine Head, JBO, In Extremo, Psychopunch, Children of Bodom, Pro-Pain and the Onkelz cover bands Enkelz and Kneipenterroristen.

=== 2005–2013: Aftermath ===
On 16 February 2007 their last concert was released on four DVDs entitled Vaya Con Tioz (Spanish for "go with the Onkelz"), a play on "Vaya con dios" ("Go with God"). In 2008 it was given an Echo (music award) in the category Musik-DVD-Produktion (national). In November 2007 the Onkelz released a new version of their album Onkelz wie wir... as their only chance to regain musical rights for their songs (which still belonged to their former label, Metal Enterprises. Weidner and Röhr have since released two solo albums and one Live album.

On New Year's Eve 2009, Russell was involved in a hit-and-run auto accident under the influence of drugs in which two young men were seriously injured. On 4 October 2010, he was sentenced to two years and three months in prison by the Frankfurt am Main court.

Events concerning Böhse Onkelz are organised in Germany, such as G.O.N.D. (Größte Onkelz Nacht Deutschlands) (Biggest Onkelz Night of Germany) which has been held since 2006. In 2011, around 20,000 people attended.

=== 2014: Comeback ===
In late 2013 the E.I.N.S GmbH was founded by the two band members Matthias "Gonzo" Röhr and Peter "Pe" Schorowsky. E.I.N.S. GmbH was founded for planning and realizing concerts. From 20 January rumors began to spread around, that the band plans a comeback. On 1 February 2014 they launched a trailer on their official website, stating they would play a concert together and revealed the date and the location, which will be on 20 June on the German race track Hockenheimring. Later, the band posted a statement on Facebook in which they announced, that further things (like a tour or a new album) could happen, if the fans do want so.

== Music and lyrics ==
The band's musical style has changed several times. Originally they played punk rock, beginning with their demo album. They were heavily inspired by punk bands (such as the Sex Pistols and the Ramones) and Oi! bands like Sham 69, Cock Sparrer and Angelic Upstarts. Their music was stylistically similar to Oi! during the early and mid-1980s, and later to heavy metal and hard rock. Russell's vocals have been a distinctive part of the band's style.

On later albums, the band experimented with a variety of musical styles. The song "1000 Fragen" ("1000 Questions") is a tribute to The Doors, featuring metaphysical lyrics and organ music. On the album Viva los tioz they combined hard rock rhythms with electronic music. An Indian sitar was used in the song "Einmal" from the album Adios. The nickname of guitarist "Gonzo" is derived from the album Double Live Gonzo by Ted Nugent (an influence on Gonzo). He and Stephan Weidner were also fans of American blues rock musician Stevie Ray Vaughan, to whom they dedicated the instrumental "Tribute to Stevie" on their 1993 album Weiß.

The first song on most of their albums serves as an introduction to the band. Many of their songs are directed against their critics (particularly journalists)—for example, "Danke für nichts", "Zeig mir den Weg", "Jaja", "Keine Amnestie für MTV". In earlier years, the Onkelz also sang drinking songs such as "Heute trinken wir richtig", "Alkohol" and "Freibier".

The lyrics of later albums concern the meaning of life, as a line from "Finde die Wahrheit" demonstrates: "Denn die Wege sind lang, und selbst der Tod ist nicht ihr Ende, wach endlich auf!" ("For the paths are long, and even death isn't their end, wake up already!"). Similar songs include "Wieder mal 'nen Tag verschenkt", "Stand der Dinge", "Das Problem bist Du" and "Dunkler Ort". The trial of the murderer of Andreas "Trimmi" Trimborn was mentioned in several songs ("Nur die Besten sterben jung", "So geht's Dir (Deine Hölle)", "Das Messer und die Wunde", "Ganz egal" and "Der Platz neben mir").

Other subjects addressed in the band's lyrics are individualism, finding oneself and self-love. In "Wenn Du wirklich willst", they sing "Sei du selbst, steh zu dir, die Wahrheit wird gelebt und nicht doziert. Du bist was du warst und du wirst sein was Du tust, beginne dich zu lieben, und du findest, was du suchst" ("Be yourself, stand for you, the truth is lived and is not taught. You are what you were and you will be what you do, begin to love yourself and you will find what you are searching for."). Songs like "Das Wunder der Persönlichkeit", "Mutier mit mir", "Ich mache was ich will" and "Ich bin wie ich bin" are other examples.

In later albums the past is repeatedly addressed, often concerning the wild experiences of band members. The song "Erinnerungen" contains the lines Ich erinner' mich gern an diese Zeit, eine Zeit die man nie vergißt. Doch ich muss mein Leben leben, meinen Weg alleine gehn, mach's gut, Du schöne Zeit, auf Wiederseh'n ("I gladly remember that time, a time that you never forget. But I have to live my life, have to go my way alone. Farewell, beautiful time, goodbye"), referring to the band's exit from the skinhead scene. The songs "Ein langer Weg", "Scheiße passiert", "Nie wieder", "Flammen", "Deutschland im Herbst", "Buch der Erinnerungen" and "Ohne mich" have a similar motif.

== Accusations of right-wing extremism ==
The band has been accused—despite many protests—of extreme right-wing tendencies, with their 1981 song "Türken raus" cited as an example. This song was written during their punk phase, and the band says it was written as a reaction to a specific Turkish gang with whom they often fought. Critics claim that the song does not refer to a specific group, but demands that "all Turks have to go". The band contends that it was only an example of their primitive way of thinking at that time. The 1983 song "Deutschland den Deutschen" ("Germany For Germans") is also often mentioned; however, the band says that this song was also written in reaction to their experiences on the street.

Another song from 1981, "SS-Staat" ("SS State") on Kill the Hippies – Oi!, is (according to the band) "a glaringly provocative anti-Nazi song". Due to poor recording quality, the line "SS-Staat im Staate, wir wollen's nicht erleben" ("SS state in the state, we don't want to experience it") can be misunderstood as "SS-Staat im Staate, wir wollen's mit erleben" ("SS state in the state, we want to experience it").

"Türken raus" and "Deutschland den Deutschen" were never officially released; they were distributed by copying the demo tapes. Weidner said: "The lyrics were stupid, and of course there was never a release of this song; of course, there will be never such a release."

The first two records of the band were released on the Rock-O-Rama label, during the mid 80's mostly known by releasing neonazi bands like Skrewdriver.

The band has denied all right-wing accusations since 1985, and has written several songs against extremism, totalitarianism and racism. Later political songs promote independent opinion and oppose hatred.

== Band members ==
- Kevin Russell – lead vocals (1980–present)
- Stephan Weidner – bass, vocals (1980–present)
- Peter Schorowsky – drums, percussion (1980–present)
- Matthias Röhr – guitars (1981–present)
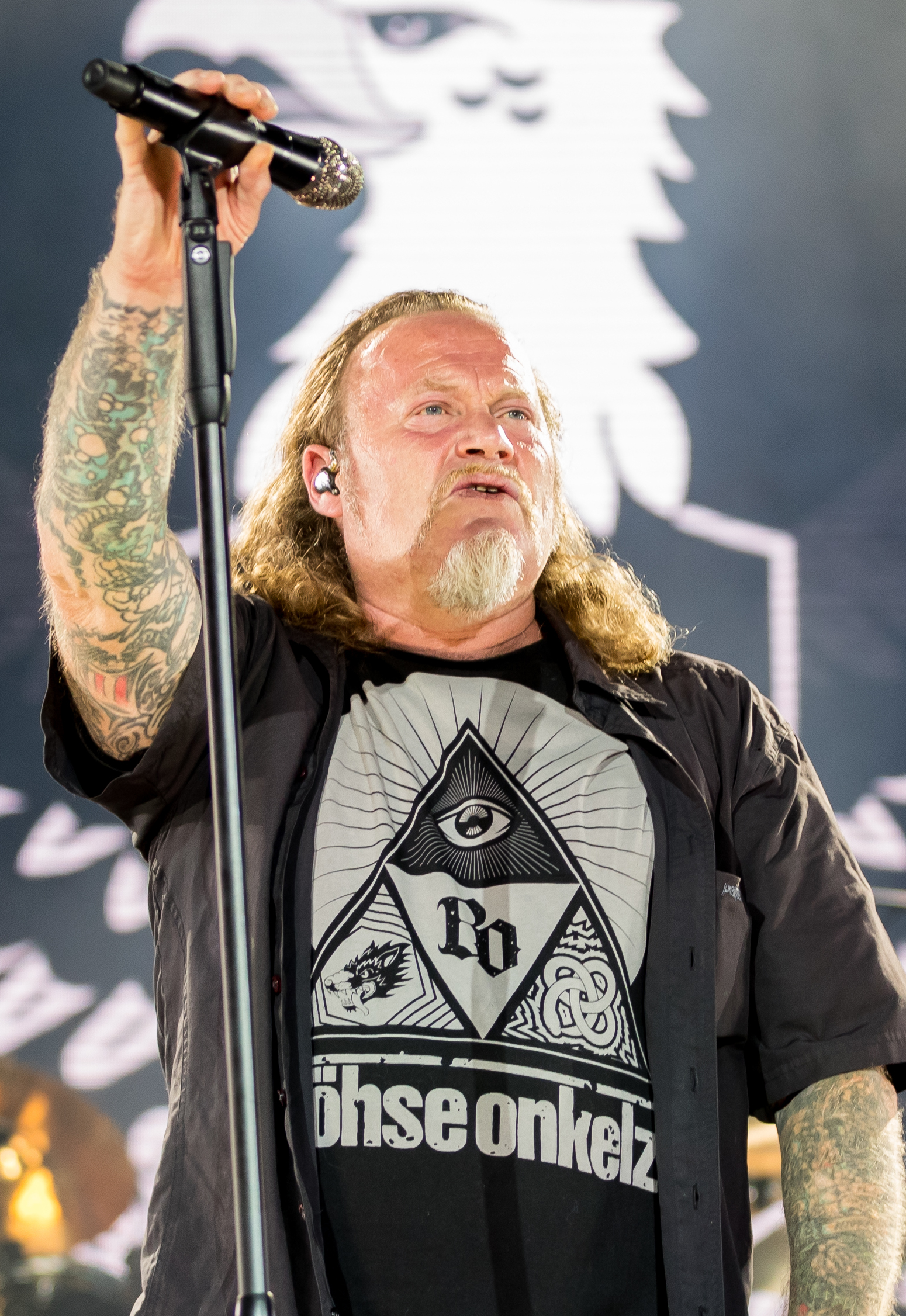
Kevin Russell (2019)

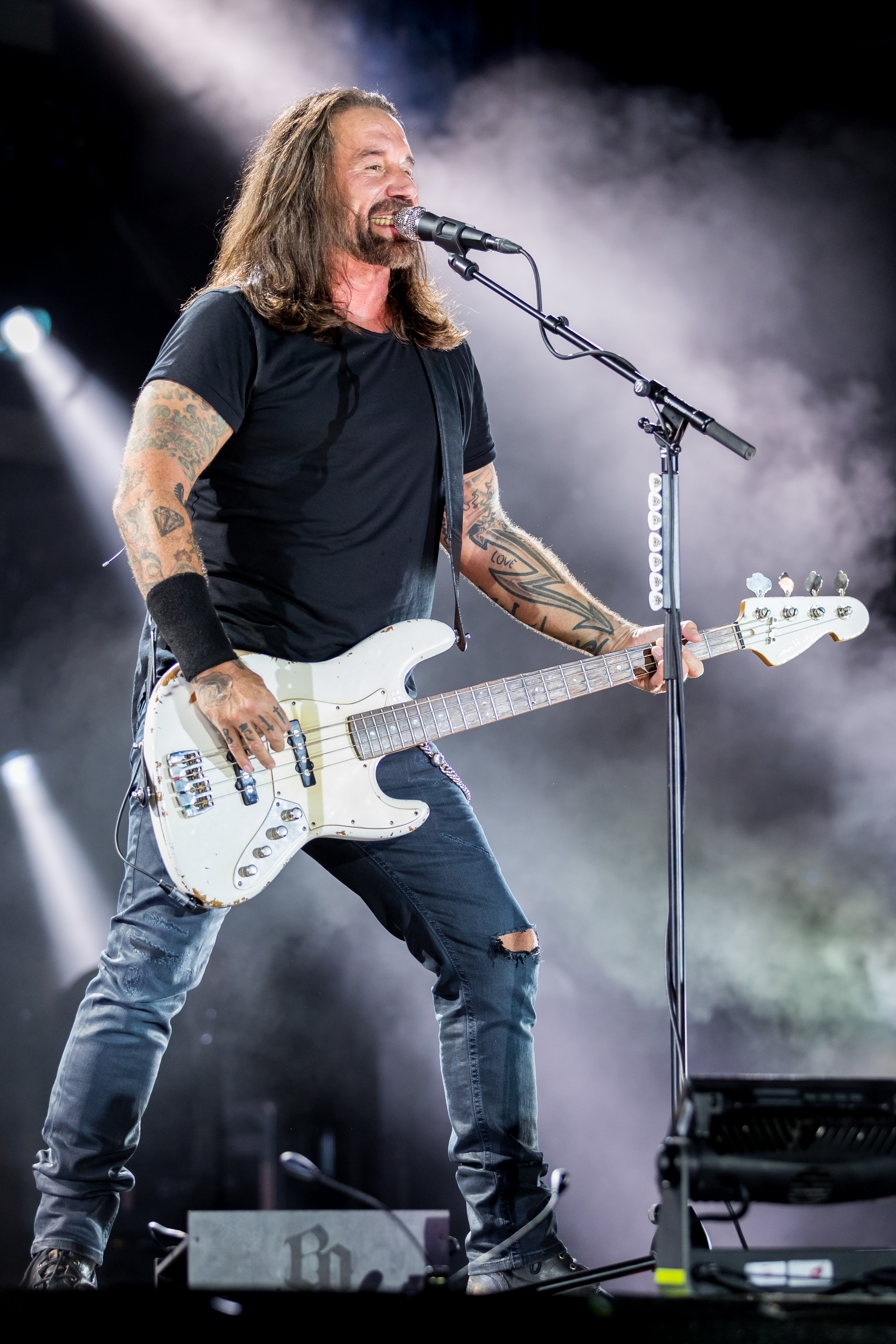
Stephan Weidner (2019)

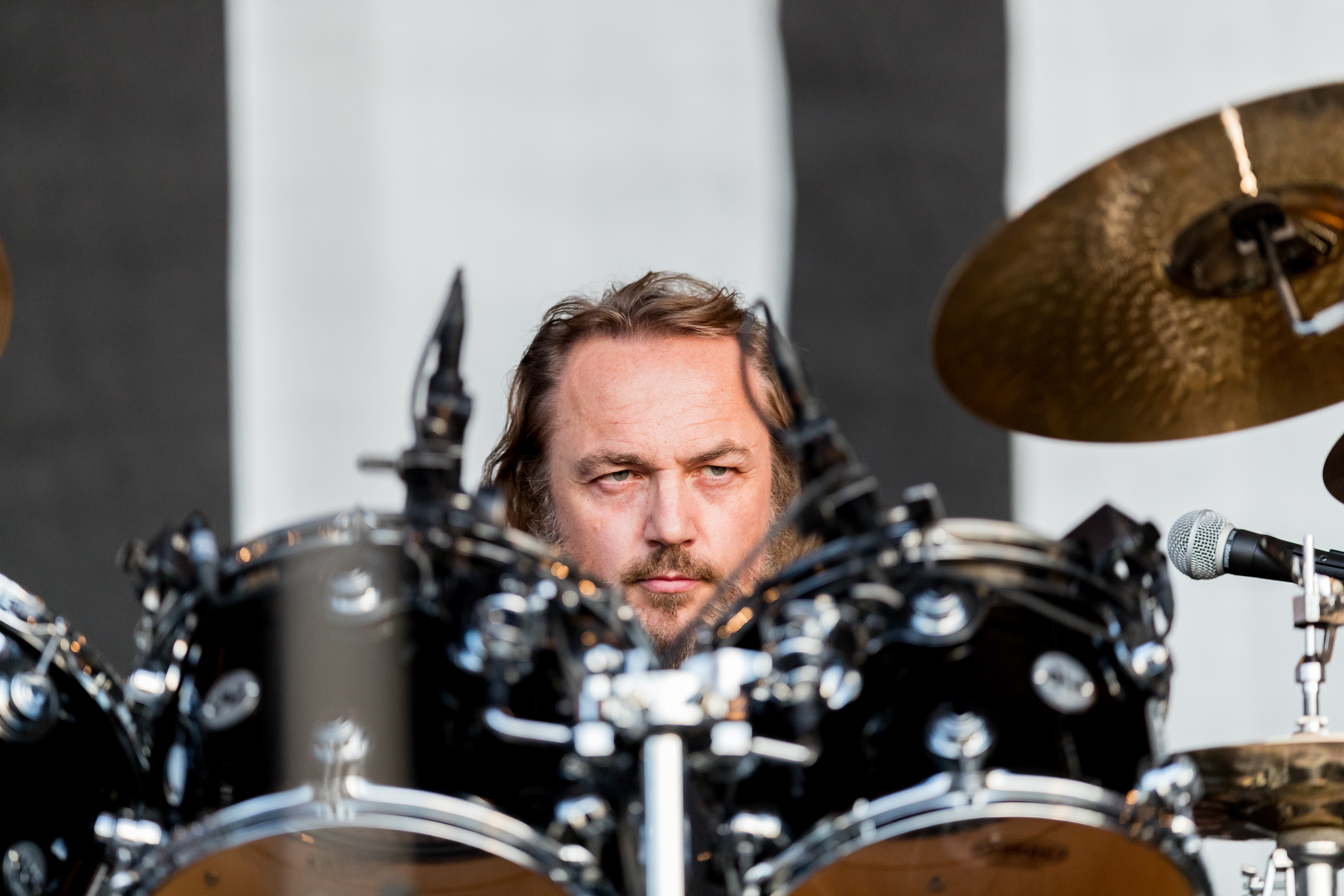
Peter Schorowsky (2018)

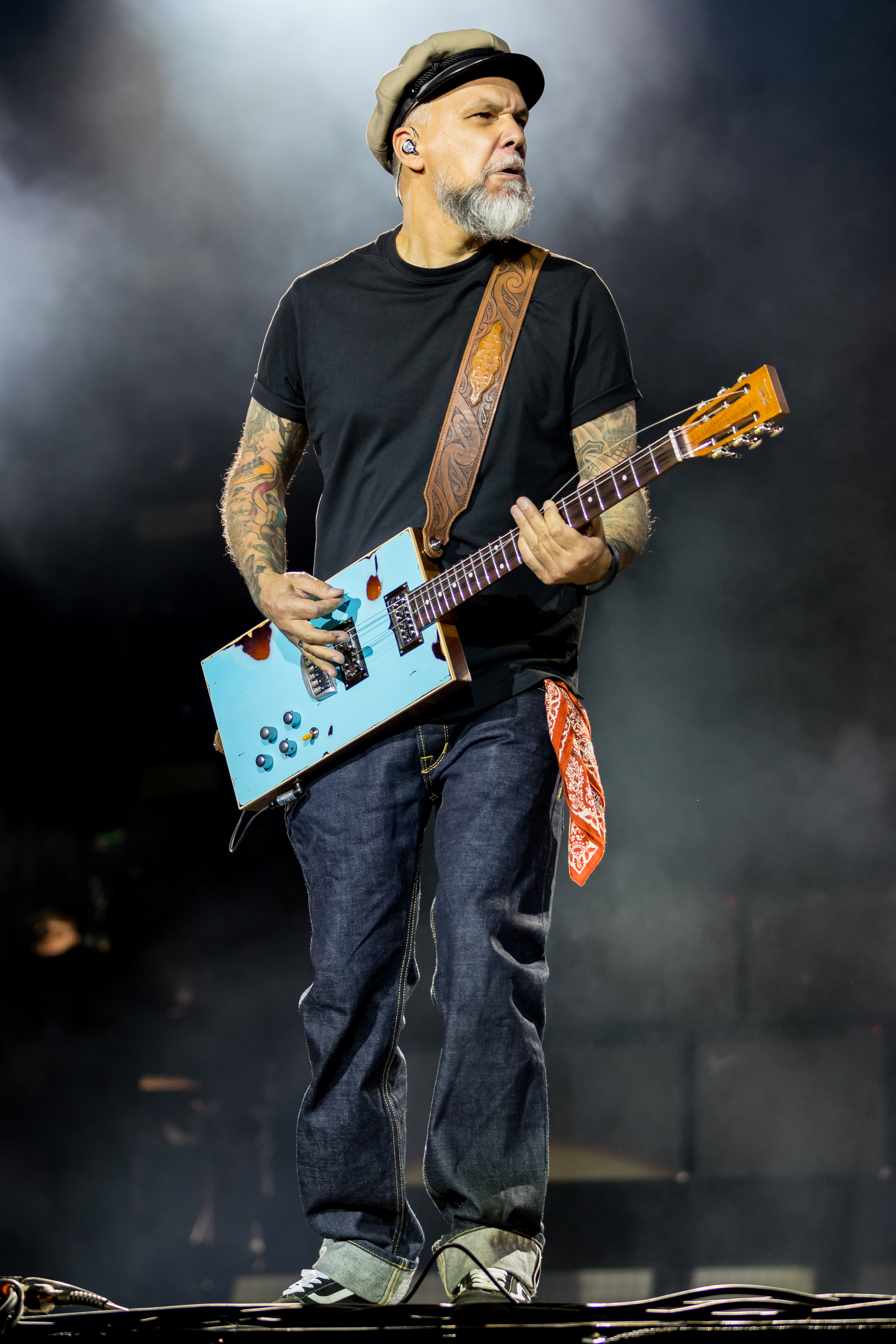
Matthias Röhr (2019)

== Discography ==
=== Studio albums ===
- 1984: Der nette Mann (banned in Germany) (Rock-O-Rama Records)
- 1985: Böse Menschen – Böse Lieder (Rock-O-Rama Records)
- 1987: Onkelz wie wir... (Metal Enterprises)
- 1988: Kneipenterroristen (Metal Enterprises)
- 1990: Es ist soweit (Metal Enterprises)
- 1991: Wir ham' noch lange nicht genug (Bellaphon Records)
- 1992: Heilige Lieder (Bellaphon Records)
- 1993: Weiß (Bellaphon Records)
- 1993: Schwarz (Bellaphon Records)
- 1995: Hier sind die Onkelz (Virgin Records)
- 1996: E.I.N.S. (Virgin Records)
- 1998: Viva los tioz (Virgin Records)
- 2000: Ein böses Märchen … aus tausend finsteren Nächten (Rule 23)
- 2002: Dopamin (Rule 23)
- 2004: Adios (Regel 23, formerly Rule 23)
- 2007: Onkelz wie wir (re-recording, Rule 23)
- 2016: Memento (Matapaloz)
- 2020: Böhse Onkelz (Matapaloz)

Since 2001, the albums released on the Bellaphon label have been distributed by SPV/regel23. The albums from the Metal Enterprises era (Kneipenterroristen, Es ist soweit, and the EP Lügenmarsch) have been distributed with a different cover by SPV/regel23 since March 2005. The album Onkelz wie wir… was re-recorded and released on 2 November 2007. On 4 December 2009, a remastered version of Onkelz wie wir... was released as Onkelz wie wir (Black Edition) by Reflex Distribution & Media (Intergroove), which bought the rights from Metal Enterprises.

=== Singles ===
- 1981: Kill the Hippies – Oi (I EM OI; two copies)
- 1992: Ich bin in dir
- 1995: Finde die Wahrheit
- 1998: Terpentin
- 1998: Shape CD (ticket for the tour of 98)
- 2000: Dunkler Ort
- 2002: Keine Amnestie für MTV
- 2004: Onkelz vs. Jesus

== Awards and record certifications ==
=== Awards ===
Year	Presenter	Awards	Result
1999	Echo	Rock/Pop: group of the year national	Nominated
2001	Echo	Rock/Pop: group of the year national	Nominated
2003	Echo	Rock/Pop: group of the year national	Nominated
2005	Echo	Rock/Pop: group of the year national	Nominated
2006	Echo	Music-DVD-Production national: La Ultima / Live in Berlin	Nominated
2008	Echo	Music-DVD-Production national: Vaya Con Tioz	Won
2015	Echo	Music-DVD-Production national: Nichts ist für die Ewigkeit – Live am Hockenheimring 2014	Nominated

=== Record certifications ===
Gold Certification

- Germany
  - 1995: for the album Heilige Lieder
  - 1996: for the album E.I.N.S.
  - 1996: for the album Hier sind die Onkelz
  - 1997: for the album Wir ham' noch lange nicht genug
  - 1997: for the video Live in Dortmund
  - 1997: for the video Live in Vienna
  - 1998: for the album Live in Dortmund
  - 2000: for the single "Dunkler Ort"
  - 2000: for the album Ein böses Märchen aus tausend finsteren Nächten
  - 2001: for the album Gestern war heute noch morgen
  - 2003: for the album Gehasst, Verdammt, Vergöttert
  - 2003: for the album Live in Vienna
  - 2003: for the album Schwarz
  - 2003: for the album Weiß
  - 2005: for the album Live in Hamburg
  - 2005: for the DVD La Ultima / Live in Berlin
  - 2006: for the DVD Böhse Onkelz Tour 2000
- Austria
  - 1998: for the album Viva los Tioz
  - 1998: for the album Hier sind die Onkelz
  - 1998: for the album E.I.N.S.

Platinum Certification

- Germany
  - 2000: for the album Ein böses Märchen aus tausend finsteren Nächten
  - 2003: for the video Live in Vienna
  - 2005: for the DVD La Ultima / Live in Berlin
  - 2006: for the album E.I.N.S.
  - 2006: for the DVD 20 Jahre – Live in Frankfurt
  - 2006: for the DVD Böhse Onkelz Tour 2000
  - 2006: for the video Live in Dortmund
  - 2020: for the album Memento

3× Gold Certification

- Germany
  - 2005: for the DVD La Ultima / Live in Berlin
  - 2006: for the DVD 20 Jahre – Live in Frankfurt

2× Platinum Certification

- Germany
  - 2007: for the DVD La Ultima / Live in Berlin

Country	Gold	Platinum
Germany	24	9
Austria	3	0
total	26	9
