= Böse Menschen – Böse Lieder =

Studio album by Böhse Onkelz
- Released: 1985
- Recorded: 1985
- Genre: Oi!, ska, hardcore punk
- Length: 37:24
- Label: Rock-O-Rama
- Producer: Böhse Onkelz

Böhse Onkelz chronology
Der nette Mann	Böse Menschen – Böse Lieder	Mexico (EP)

Böse Menschen – Böse Lieder (German for Evil People – Evil Songs) is the second album by the German rock band Böhse Onkelz. It was released in 1985. It sold 4,000 copies.

== Track listing ==
1. Heute trinken wir richtig (Today we're really gonna drink)
2. Das Signum des Verrats (The sign of betrayal)
3. Stunde des Siegers (The hour of the victor)
4. Was kann ich denn dafür (What can I do for it)
5. Ein Mensch wie du und ich (A human like you and me)
6. Keiner wusste, wie's geschah (Nobody knew how it happened)
7. Hässlich, brutal und gewalttätig (Ugly, brutal and violent)
8. Nennt mich Gott (Call me god)
9. 7 Tage ohne Sünde (7 days without a sin)
10. Hass (Hate)

== Track notes ==
=== Heute trinken wir richtig ===
Literally "Today we drink right", but means "Today we drink a lot"; a song about extreme alcohol consumption.

=== Das Signum des Verrats ===
"The sign of betrayal" - referring to the punk and skinhead scene, which drifted into left-wing (punks) and right-wing (skinheads) circles and so betrayed their own basic idea.

=== Stunde des Siegers ===
"The hour of victory" - meaning that everyone will have the chance to strike back and to change their life.

=== Was kann ich denn dafür ===
"What can I do for it, that we're so beautiful" - in this song the band glorifies itself.

=== Ein Mensch wie du und ich ===
"A human like you and me" - a song about perverts.

=== Keiner wusste, wie's geschah ===
"Nobody knew how it happened" - about the band and its arising celebrity in the scene.

=== Hässlich, brutal und gewalttätig ===
"We wear all swastikas / Skinheads have only violence in sense / Is it that you want to hear / that we're brainless fighters?" - the song implies that skinheads are not all neonazis, and the refrain "We are ugly, brutally and violating" gives the song an ironic note.

=== Nennt mich Gott ===
"Call me God".

=== 7 Tage ohne Sünde ===
"7 days without sin" - meaning seven days without sex, because the person concerned has a sexually transmitted infection.

=== Hass ===
"Hate" - an anti-political song. "Workless youths are today normal, the rich more richer, all other is the same".
