= Matthias Röhr =

German musician

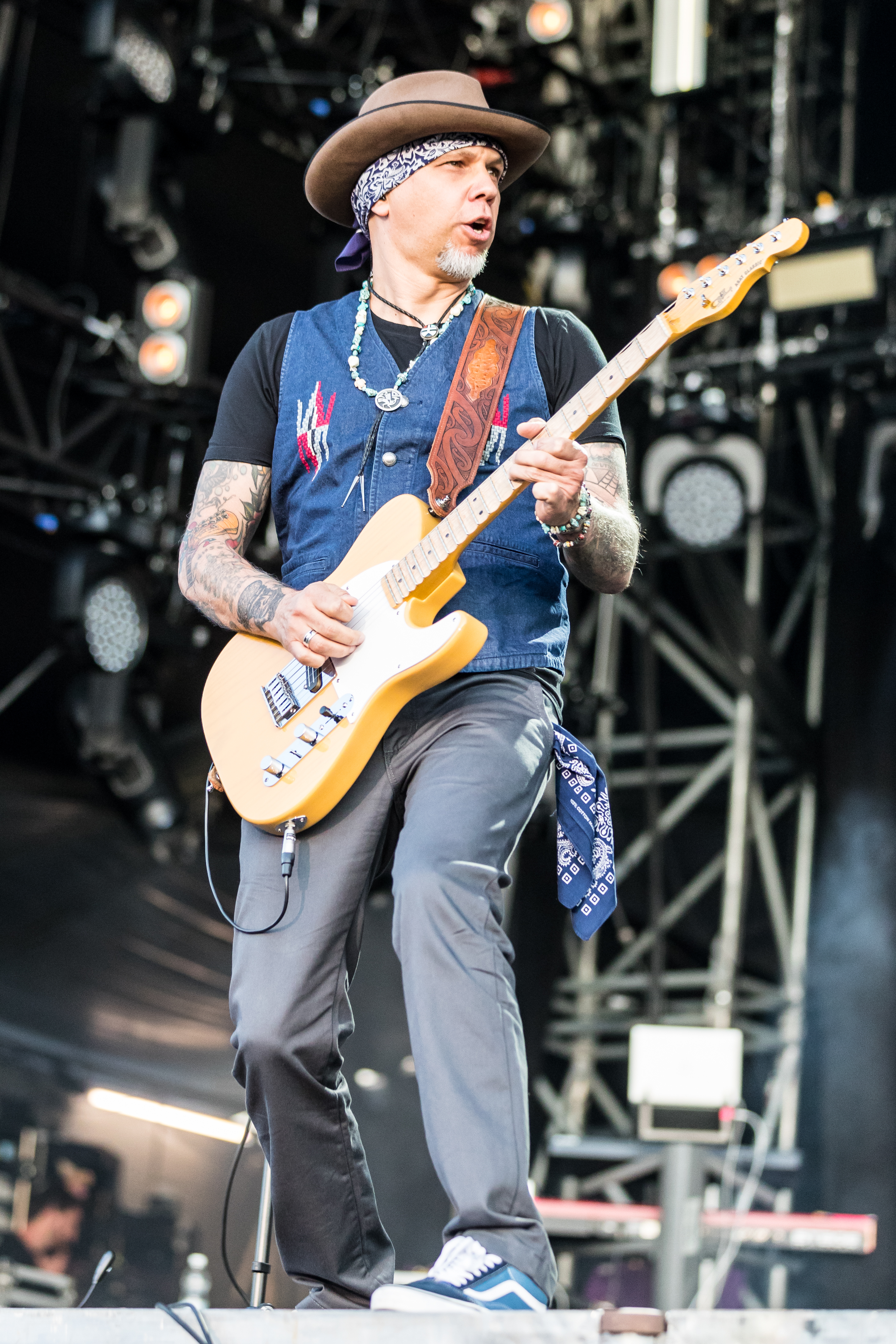
- Röhr in 2018

Background information
- Also known as: Gonzo; Matt Roehr
- Born: 16 April 1962 (age 63); Frankfurt, West Germany
- Genres: Hard rock
- Instrument: Guitar
- Years active: 1980–present
- Labels: Rule23 Recordings
- Member of: Böhse Onkelz
- Website: gonzomusic.com

Matthias "Gonzo" Röhr (born 16 April 1962) is a German musician who has been the guitarist of the rock band Böhse Onkelz since 1981. His stage name derives from Double Live Gonzo!, an album by Ted Nugent. When Böhse Onkelz split up between 2005 and 2014, he was known as Matt Roehr.

== Early life ==
Röhr grew up in the area of Frankfurt in a strictly Catholic family. The four Röhr brothers and sisters rarely saw their father due to his work schedule in a grocery store and later in his own kiosk in Frankfurt. The family moved often within the Frankfurt area.

== Career ==
Röhr began playing the guitar at age 12. Despite his strict education and his youth, Röhr discovered what was important in his life. The repetitive church visits and the ministers, who always tried to make him a better man, were not parts of the life he wanted, but the music was. He and his friends pooled their money to pay for guitar lessons. After a few weeks he left the lessons, because he wanted to play "real" music and not folk music or endless scales. Soon after, he sold his guitar, bought an electric bass guitar and joined a school band. When he entered the Frankfurt punk scene in 1980, he had already played in several bands. In 1981, he joined the Böhse Onkelz as the bass guitar player. After the first album, Soundtrack zum Untergang 2, he switched to guitar and played it until the band split up in 2005.

In August 2006, he played guitar for Rose Tattoo at the Wacken Open Air for the deceased Peter Wells.

In April 2007, Röhr began recording his first solo album BARRA DA TIJUCA, which took him four months in studios in Brazil (Rio de Janeiro) and the U.S. (Miami, New York). He joined forces with the rock singer Charlie Huhn (Ted Nugent, Humble Pie, Gary Moore, Foghat) and Brazilian and German top musicians. The album was released in Europe in October 2007 by GonzomusicRecordingCo (GRC). In 2010, Röhr released his second studio album Out of the Great Depression.

== Personal life ==
Röhr and his wife Verena lived in Dublin from 2015 to 2020.

== Discography ==
For the Böhse Onkelz albums see Böhse Onkelz discography.

- 2007: Barra da Tijuca
- 2008: UHAD2BTHERE! Live
- 2010: Out of the Great Depression
- 2011: Blitz & Donner
- 2013 - Zuflucht vor dem Sturm

== Books ==
Meine letzten 48 Stunden mit den Böhsen Onkelz, Matthias Röhr, ISBN 3-931624-36-6
