= Kevin Russell (musician) =

British rock singer

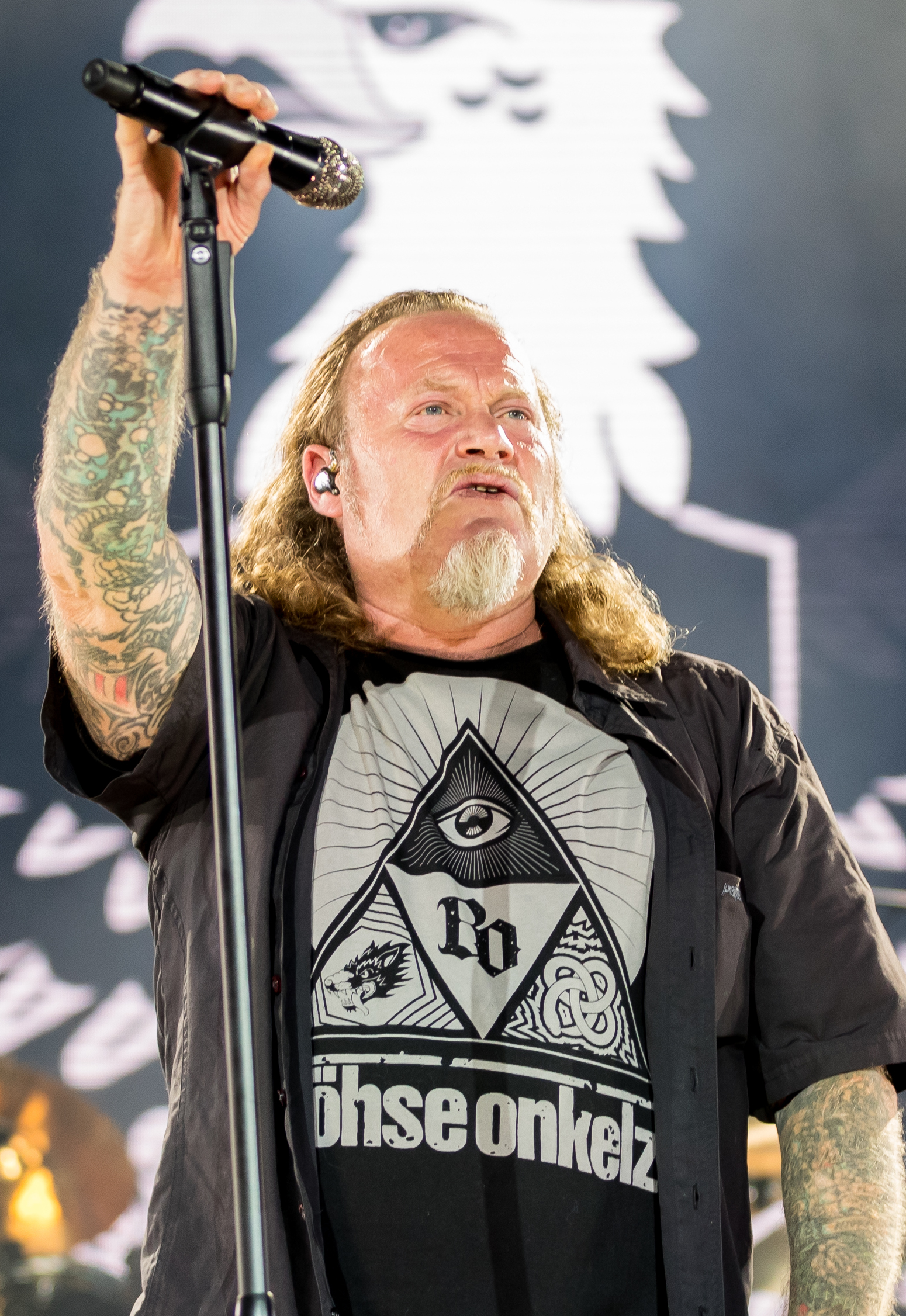
- Russell in 2019

Background information
- Born: Kevin Richard Russell; 12 January 1964 (age 62); Hamburg, West Germany
- Genres: Hard rock, German rock, punk
- Occupation: Singer
- Years active: 1980–present
- Member of: Böhse Onkelz

Kevin Richard Russell (born 12 January 1964) is a British singer who is the lead vocalist and one of the three founding members of the German rock band Böhse Onkelz. Despite being born in Germany and singing exclusively in German, he does not hold German citizenship.

Russell was the band's lead singer from 1980 until the group broke up in 2005. He was also the lead singer of Veritas Maximus, which was founded in 2012. In 2014, Böhse Onkelz reunited with Russell as their lead singer again.

== Personal life ==
Russell's father is from England, his mother is German.

In October 2010, Russell was sentenced to two years and three months in prison for his role as driver in a hit-and-run accident near Frankfurt, driving under the influence of drugs and seriously injuring two people.

Since 1986, Russell works as a tattoo artist. For example, the tattoo illustration on the cover of the 1992 album The Madman's Return of the German Eurodance group Snap! came from him.
