= Onkelz wie wir... =

Onkelz wie wir…

Studio album by Böhse Onkelz
- Released: 1987
- Recorded: 1986–1987
- Genre: Hard rock
- Length: 32:03
- Label: Metal Enterprises
- Producer: Böhse Onkelz and Ingo Nowotny

Böhse Onkelz chronology
Mexico	Onkelz wie wir…	Kneipenterroristen

Onkelz wie wir... (German for Unklez (uncles) Like Us) is the fourth album by German rock band Böhse Onkelz, released in 1987. A newly recorded version of the album was released on 2 November 2007.

Professional ratings
Review scores
Source	Rating
Rock Hard	(7.0/10)
CDStarts.de	(7/10)
Pressure Magazine	(5/6)

== Track listing ==
1. Onkelz wie wir (Onkelz Like Us)
2. Von Glas zu Glas (From Glass to Glass)
3. Erinnerungen (Memories)
4. Bomberpilot (Bomber Pilot)
5. Dick + Durstig (Fat and Thirsty)
6. Falsche Propheten (False Prophets)
7. Am Morgen danach (The Morning After)
8. Schöner Tag (Beautiful Day)
9. Heut' Nacht (Tonight)
10. !

== Track notes ==
=== Onkelz wie wir ===
Like many Onkelz songs, "Onkelz wie wir" glorifies the band.

=== Von Glas zu Glas ===
A song about alcohol, and the phenomenon of girls appearing prettier from glass to glass.

=== Erinnerungen ===
This song is an elegiac goodbye to the old days. "I love to recall those times / Times I'll never forget / But I have to live my life, go my own way / Take care, good old days / Farewell."

=== Bomberpilot ===
An ironic song about the insanity of wars.

=== Dick + Durstig ===
This song is about alcohol, as well as the band's lead singer Kevin, who weighed about 240 pounds around this time.

=== Falsche Propheten ===
This song is against following all kinds of "false prophets", whether they are religious or political figures, or the band itself.

=== Am Morgen danach ===
The morning after heavy drinking.

=== Schöner Tag ===
Another song about alcohol.

=== Heut' Nacht ===
A song about murderous obsession.

=== ! ===
A fast guitar instrumental. The working title was "Speed".

== Charts ==
Chart (2007)	Peak position
German Albums (Offizielle Top 100)	16
