= Peter Schorowsky =

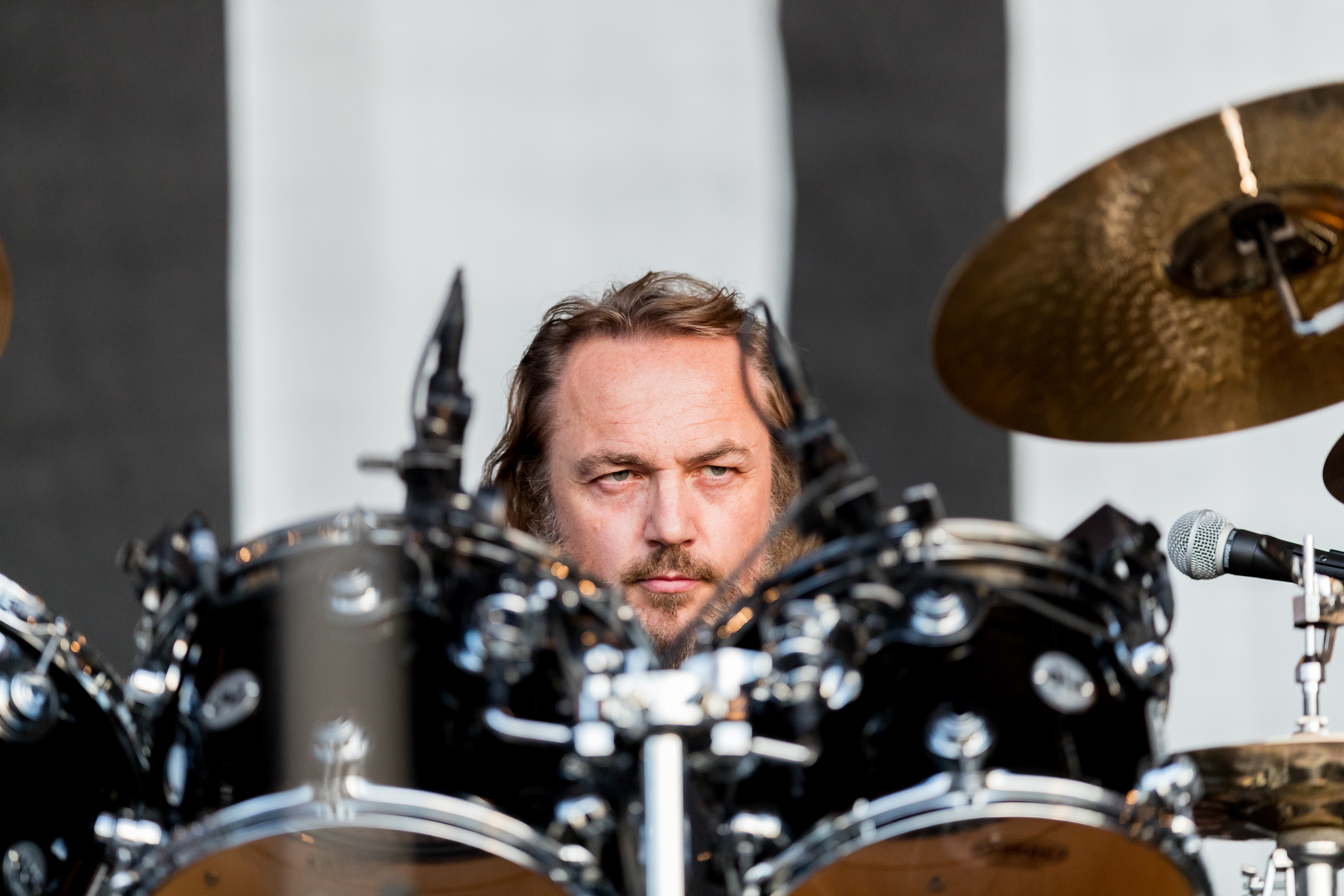

Background information
- Also known as: Pe
- Born: 15 June 1964 (age 62); Hösbach, Bavaria, West Germany (now Germany)
- Genres: Hard rock
- Occupation: Musician
- Instrument: Drums
- Years active: 1980–present
- Label: Rule23 Recordings
- Member of: Böhse Onkelz

Peter "Pe" Schorowsky (born 15 June 1964) is a German musician and a founding member of the rock band Böhse Onkelz. He played drums until the band's split in 2005.

== Biography ==
Schorowsky is the second of four brothers born to a Catholic family in the Baviarian town of Hösbach. After completing his formal education, he trained as a welder. He currently lives with his family in Oberägeri, Switzerland.

He met Stephan Weidner and Kevin Russell in his hometown of Hösbach. In November 1980, they formed Böhse Onkelz, with Schorowsky on drums. After the band left the Oi! music scene, they achieved considerable success from the 1990s until the band's breakup in 2005.

In 2005, Schorowsky released his first book with the title Sophisticated: Aliens, Fliegenschiss & Mamas BH. ISBN 3-00-016280-1.
