= Xavier Naidoo discography =

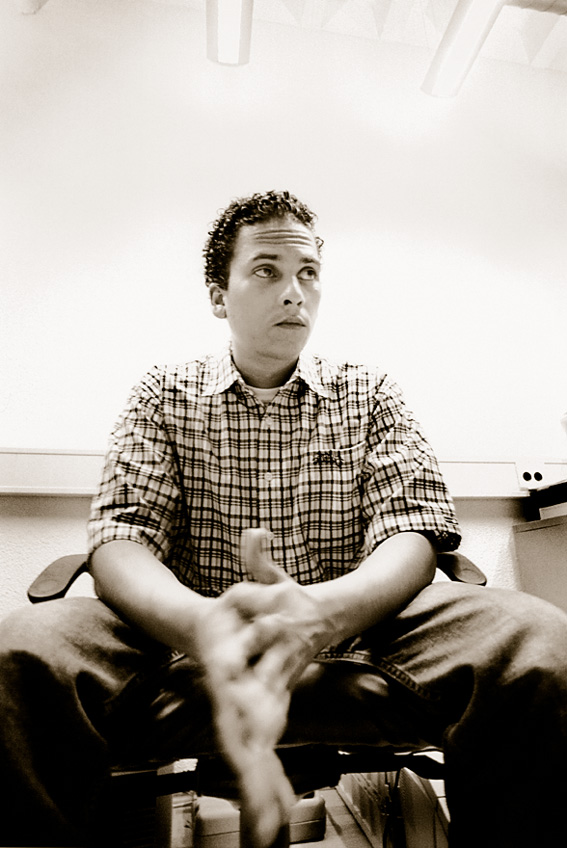
- Studio albums: 8
- Live albums: 4
- Singles: 33

German singer Xavier Naidoo began his music career in the early 1990s. His debut studio album, Seeing Is Believing, was released in 1994, consisting mostly of cover versions of traditional tracks and soul songs from the 1960s and 1970s. Released in the United States only, it failed to chart on the Billboard 200 and thus, was never released in Europe. Following a fall-out with main producer Nicole Dürr, he signed with Frankfurt am Main-based Pelham Power Productions (3P) and began appearing as a background vocalist on several of his label-mates' albums. Naidoo's second studio album Nicht von dieser Welt, produced unter the guidance of Moses Pelham and Martin Haas, was released in May 1998. The album peaked at number one on the German Albums Chart and sold more than a million copies. Its singles included his debut single "20.000 Meilen", the top twenty entries "Nicht von dieser Welt" and "Seine Straßen" as well as top five hit "Sie sieht mich nicht", which served as the theme song for the feature film Asterix & Obelix Take On Caesar (1999). A gold-certified live album of his first concert tour, simply titled Live (1999), reached the top ten in Germany the following year.

His third effort, the double album Zwischenspiel – Alles für den Herrn, was released on his own label Naidoo Records in March 2002 after his departure from 3P. An instant success, it debuted atop the charts in both Austria and Germany and was certified double platinum by the Bundesverband Musikindustrie (BVMI). Three of its four singles, including "Wo willst du hin?" and "Abschied nehmen", became top five hits on the singles charts. In 2003, he collaborated with American rapper RZA on his compilation album The World According to RZA; their single "Ich kenne nichts (das so schön ist wie du)" reached number-one on the German Singles Chart and the top three in Austria and Switzerland, becoming his highest-charting single up to that point. The same year, his second live album ...Alles Gute vor uns... was released to gold status and top ten success.

Naidoo's fourth album Telegramm für X was released in November 2005. It reached number-one in Austria, Germany, and Switzerland was certified quadruple platinum by the BVMI. The album produced the top three singles "Dieser Weg" and "Was wir alleine nicht schaffen", while his second number-one hit "Danke", a song about the 2006 FIFA World Cup, was included on a reissue of the album. Alles kann besser werden, his fifth studio album, was released in 2009. It became his fifth number-one album in Germany, and reached the three in Austria and Switzerland. "Alles kann besser werden", its lead single, reached number six on the German Singles Chart though subsequent singles were less successful.

Gespaltene Persönlichkeit, a collaboration album with rapper Kool Savas, was released in 2012. It debuted at number atop the charts in Germany and Switzerland and was certified platinum by the BVMI. Single "Schau nicht mehr zurück" entered the top three in both countries. The same year, Naidoo's first compilation album Danke fürs Zuhören – Liedersammlung 1998–2012 was released to number-one success throughout German-speaking Europe. Mordsmusik, a dubstep album produced under his pseudonym Der Xer, and Bei meiner Seele were both released the following year. The latter album peaked at number one in Austria and Germany and featured the same-titled top two hit.

A highly demanded producer, songwriter and guest vocalist, Naidoo has collaborated with several musicians and musical projects, including all-male vocal group Söhne Mannheims, the Christian music project Zeichen der Zeit, the transnational anti-racism project Brothers Keepers, and the cast of the television series Sing meinen Song – Das Tauschkonzert, the German version of The Best Singers series. Among his most successful appearances rank Brothers Keepers's "Adriano (Letzte Warnung)".

== Albums ==
=== Studio albums ===
List of studio albums, with selected chart positions and certifications
Title	Details	Peak chart positions			Certifications
Title	Details	GER	AUT	SWI	Certifications
Seeing Is Believing	Released: 7 September 1993; Format: CD (United States only); Label: Megaphon Music	—	—	—	
Nicht von dieser Welt	Released: 30 August 1998; Format: CD; Label: 3P, Epic Records	1	5	12	AUT: Platinum; GER: 2× Platinum; SWI: Platinum
Zwischenspiel – Alles für den Herrn	Released: 25 March 2002; Format: CD; Label: Naidoo Records	1	1	3	AUT: Platinum; GER: 2× Platinum; SWI: 2× Platinum
Telegramm für X	Released: 25 November 2005; Format: CD, digital download; Label: Naidoo Records	1	1	1	GER: 4× Platinum; SWI: 3× Platinum
Alles kann besser werden	Released: 9 October 2009; Format: CD, digital download; Label: Naidoo Records	1	3	2	GER: 2× Platinum; SWI: Gold
Mordsmusik (as Der Xer)	Released: 8 March 2013; Format: CD, digital download; Label: Naidoo Records	62	44	—	
Bei meiner Seele	Released: 31 May 2013; Format: CD, digital download; Label: Naidoo Records	1	1	3	GER: Platinum; AUT: Gold
Tanzmusik (Xavier lebt hier nicht mehr) (as Der Xer)	Released: 12 December 2014; Format: CD, digital download; Label: Naidoo Records	—	—	—	
Nicht von dieser Welt 2	Released: 1 April 2016; Format: CD, digital download; Label: Naidoo Records	1	1	1	GER: Gold
Für dich.	Released: 24 November 2017; Format: CD, digital download; Label: Naidoo Records	3	6	5	
Hin und weg	Released: 19 July 2019; Format: CD, digital download; Label: Naidoo Records	3	8	4	
"—" denotes an album that did not chart or was not released in that territory.

==== Collaborative albums as Xavas ====
(Xavas being Xavier Naidoo and Kool Savas)

Title	Details	Peak chart positions			Certifications
Title	Details	GER	AUT	SWI	Certifications
Gespaltene Persönlichkeit	Released: 21 September 2012; Format: CD, digital download; Label: Naidoo Records, Essah Entertainment	1	3	1	GER: Platinum

=== Live albums ===
Title	Details	Peak chart positions			Certifications
Title	Details	GER	AUT	SWI	Certifications
Live	Released: 1 November 1999; Format: CD; Label: 3p, Epic Records	9	18	33	GER: Gold
...Alles Gute vor uns...	Released: 2 June 2003; Format: CD; Label: Naidoo Records	8	2	11	AUT: Gold; GER: Gold; SWI: Gold
Wettsingen in Schwetzingen - MTV Unplugged	Released: 19 September 2008; Format: CD, digital download; Label: Naidoo	1	2	1	AUT: Gold; GER: Platinum; SWI: Gold
Alles kann besser werden – Live	Released: 12 November 2010; Format: CD, digital download; Label: Naidoo	1	15	2	GER: Gold
Hört, Hört! Live von der Waldbühne	Released: 28 November 2014; Format: CD, digital download; Label: Naidoo	10	19	28	
Nicht von dieser Welt 2 – Allein mit Flügel live	Released: 28 October 2016; Format: CD, digital download; Label: Naidoo	1	—	—	
Danke fürs Zuhören 2 – Nicht von dieser Welt Tour – Die Zweite 2017	Released: 22 November 2019; Format: CD, digital download; Label: Naidoo	35	57	—	

== Singles ==
=== As lead artist ===
Title	Year	Peak chart positions			Certifications	Album
Title	Year	GER	AUT	SWI	Certifications	Album
"20.000 Meilen"	1998	32	—	—		Nicht von dieser Welt
"Nicht von dieser Welt"	1998	19	—	—		Nicht von dieser Welt
"Führ mich ans Licht"	1998	27	35	40		Nicht von dieser Welt
"Sie sieht mich nicht"	1999	2	11	5	GER: Platinum	Nicht von dieser Welt
"Eigentlich gut" (featuring Illmat!c & Bruda Sven)	1999	32	—	—		Nicht von dieser Welt
"Bis an die Sterne (Live)"	1999	—	—	—		Nicht von dieser Welt
"Seine Straßen"	2000	15	40	37		Nicht von dieser Welt
"Wo willst du hin?"	2002	3	13	11		Zwischenspiel / Alles für den Herrn
"Bevor du gehst"	2002	5	14	49		Zwischenspiel / Alles für den Herrn
"Wenn ich schon Kinder hätte" (featuring Curse)	2002	47	49	—		Zwischenspiel / Alles für den Herrn
"Abschied nehmen"	2002	5	6	43		Zwischenspiel / Alles für den Herrn
"Ich kenne nichts (das so schön ist wie du)" (with RZA)	2003	1	2	3	AUT: Platinum; GER: Gold; SWI: Gold	Zwischenspiel / Alles für den Herrn
"Dieser Weg"	2005	2	2	3	GER: Gold	Telegramm für X
"Bist du am Leben interessiert" (featuring Tone)	2006	27	32	24		Telegramm für X
"Zeilen aus Gold"	2006	32	49	66		Telegramm für X
"Danke"	2006	1	34	100	GER: Gold	Telegramm für X
"Was wir alleine nicht schaffen"	2006	2	10	29	GER: Platinum	Telegramm für X
"Wann" (featuring Cassandra Steen)	2008	35	29	—		Wettsingen in Schwetzingen
"Alles kann besser werden"	2009	6	16	28		Alles kann besser werden
"Halte durch"	2010	29	—	—		Alles kann besser werden
"Ich brauche dich"	2010	30	40	—		Alles kann besser werden
"Wild vor Wut" (featuring Naturally 7)	2010	73	—	—		Alles kann besser werden
"Bitte hör nicht auf zu träumen" (featuring Naturally 7 & Cassandra Steen)	2010	22	71	49	GER: Gold	Alles kann besser werden
"Schau nicht mehr zurück" (with Kool Savas as XAVAS)	2012	2	14	3	GER: Gold	Gespaltene Persöhnlichkeit
"Wage es zu glauben" (with Kool Savas as XAVAS)	2012	34	45	37		Gespaltene Persöhnlichkeit
"Bei meiner Seele"	2013	2	19	23	GER: Gold	Bei meiner Seele
"Der letzte Blick"	2013	37	51	70		Bei meiner Seele
"Hört, hört"	2014	49	61	48		Bei meiner Seele
"Frei"	2016	64	—	—		Nicht von dieser Welt 2
"Das lass' ich nicht zu"	2016	—	—	—		Nicht von dieser Welt 2
"Der Fels"	2016	—	—	—		Nicht von dieser Welt 2
"Nimm mich mit"	2017	—	—	—		Für dich.
"Für dich"	2018	—	—	—		Für dich.
"Ich danke allen Menschen"	2019	32	47	18		Hin und weg
"Welt" (featuring Kontra K)	2019	73	—	—		Hin und weg
"Gute Zeiten" (featuring MoTrip)	2019	—	—	—		Hin und weg
	"—" denotes a single that did not chart or was not released in that territory.					

=== Other charted songs ===
Title	Year	Peak chart positions			Album
Title	Year	GER	AUT	SWI	Album
"Lass nicht los" (with Kool Savas as XAVAS)	2012	—	45	—	Gespaltene Persöhnlichkeit
"Die Zukunft trägt meinen Namen" (with Kool Savas as XAVAS)	2012	—	47	—	Gespaltene Persöhnlichkeit
"Wenn es Nacht ist" (with Kool Savas as XAVAS)	2012	—	52	—	Gespaltene Persöhnlichkeit
"Amoi seg' ma uns wieder"	2014	12	3	5	Sing meinen Song - Das Tauschkonzert (Sampler)
"Du bist das Licht"	2014	46	44	52	Sing meinen Song - Das Tauschkonzert (Sampler)
"Hallelujah"	2014	27	20	36	Sing meinen Song - Das Weihnachtskonzert (Sampler)
"Mitten unterm Jahr"	2015	31	15	34	Sing meinen Song – Das Tauschkonzert Vol. 2 (Sampler)
"Weck mich auf 2016"	2016	69	75	—	Sing meinen Song – Das Tauschkonzert, Vol. 3 (Sampler)
	"—" denotes a single that did not chart or was not released in that territory.				

=== As a featured artist ===
Title	Year	Peak chart positions			Album
Title	Year	GER	AUT	SWI	Album
"Freisein" (Sabrina Setlur introducing Xavier Naidoo)	1997	23	—	—	Die Neue S-Klasse
"Skillz" (Illmat!c featuring Moses Pelham & Xavier Naidoo)	1999	75	—	—	Still Ill
"3P (Licence 2 Kill)" (3P feat. Setlur, T. Hofmann, Pelham, Illmat!c & Naidoo)	2000	32	—	—	3P: Revolution
"Alles" (Sabrina Setlur featuring Xavier Naidoo)	2000	16	—	86	Anatomy soundtrack
"Way to Mars" (Sommersault featuring Xavier Naidoo)	2001	30	—	—	By Your Side
"Gib mir Musik" (Edo Zanki & Friends)	2001	44	—	—	Jetzt komm ich
"Du, nur du" (Ben Becker & Xavier Naidoo)	2001	54	—	—	Bis an alle Sterne (Sampler)
"Jeanny" (Reamonn featuring Xavier Naidoo)	2001	18	31	86	Dream No. 7
"Über sieben Brücken musst du gehen" (Erkan Aki & Xavier Naidoo)	2001	40	51	58	Zeit der großen Gefühle
"Tu me manques" (Stress featuring Xavier Naidoo)	2003	—	—	20	Tu me manques
"Tage und Stunden" (Bintia featuring Xavier Naidoo)	2004	24	49	71	B-Ständig
"With You" (Majestic 12 featuring Xavier Naidoo)	2006	68	74	—	Majestic
"Sehnsucht" (Schiller featuring Xavier Naidoo)	2008	13	7	—	Sehnsucht
"Aura" (Kool Savas featuring Xavier Naidoo)	2011	14	33	13	Aura
"Danke" (Nico Suave featuring Xavier Naidoo)	2014	20	—	—	Unvergesslich
"Ich tue es aus Liebe" (Seven featuring Xavier Naidoo)	2016	—	—	59	Best Of 2002-2016 (Limited 2CD 2nd Version International)
"Nur mit dir" (Shirin David featuring Xavier Naidoo)	2019	8	—	11	Supersize
"Freisein" (Juju featuring Xavier Naidoo)	2019	91	—	—	Bling Bling
	"—" denotes a single that did not chart or was not released in that territory.				

== Other appearances ==
=== Album ===
Title	Year	Artist(s)	Album
"Freisein"	1997	Xavier Naidoo	Die neue S-Klasse
"3P (Licence 2 Kill)"	1998	M. Pelham, T. Hofmann, Illmati!c, S. Setlur, Naidoo	3P: Revolution / Evolution
"Skillz"	1999	Illmati!c, Xavier Naidoo	Still Ill
"Lied (Du, nur du)"	2001	Ben Becker, Xavier Naidoo	Wir heben ab
"Soulmusic"	2001	Curse, Xavier Naidoo	Von innen nach aussen
"Gib mir Musik"	2001	Edo Zanki, Xavier Naidoo	Jetzt komm ich
"Über sieben Brücken musst du gehen"	2001	Erkan Aki, Xavier Naidoo	Zeit der großen Gefühle
"Flashgott"	2001	Jan Delay, Xavier Naidoo, Dennis Dublate	Searching for The Jan Soul Rebels
"Jeanny"	2001	Reamonn, Xavier Naidoo	Dream No. 7
"Way to Mars"	2001	Sommersault, Xavier Naidoo	By Your Side
"Tanz"	2003	Harris, Xavier Naidoo	Dirty Harry
"Digital Garden"	2003	Metaphysics, Xavier Naidoo	Digital Garden
"Ich kenne nichts (das so schön ist wie du)"	2003	RZA, Xavier Naidoo	The World According to RZA
"Tu me manques"	2003	Stress, Xavier Naidoo	Tu me manques
"Tage und Stunden"	2004	Bintia, Xavier Naidoo	B-Ständig
"None of This"	2004	Jam & Spoon, Xavier Naidoo	Tripomatic Fairytales 3003
"Serious"	2004	Kool & The Gang, Xavier Naidoo, Mousse T.	The Hits: Reloaded
"Dieses Mal (Sommer unseres Lebens)"	2004	Melbeatz, Xavier Naidoo	Rapper's Delight
"2. Bildungsweg"	2004	Melbeatz, Tone, Xavier Naidoo	Rapper's Delight
"Dir allein"	2005	BAP, Xavier Naidoo	Dreimal zehn Jahre
"Was hab ich dir angetan?"	2005	Kool Savas, Azad, Xavier Naidoo	One
"Ich wünsch mir"	2005	Olli Banjo, Xavier Naidoo	Schizogenie
"Schick mir 'nen Engel"	2005	Tone, Xavier Naidoo	Zukunftsmusik
"Weisse Taube"	2006	Azad, Xavier Naidoo	Game Over
"Schall und Rauch"	2006	Al Di Meola, Xavier Naidoo	Vocal Rendezvous
"Hörst du mich?"	2006	D-Flame, Xavier Naidoo	F.F.M.
"With You"	2006	Majestic 12, Xavier Naidoo	Majestic
"Ich gehör nicht dir"	2007	Bass Sultan Hengzt, Xavier Naidoo	Der Schmetterlingseffekt
"Euer Sohn"	2007	Pal One, Xavier Naidoo	Fokus: Rap
"People Like Them"	2007	Tomcraft, Xavier Naidoo	For the Queen
"Sternschnuppa"	2008	Bucher & Schmid, Xavier Naidoo	Iisziit
"Stell dir vor"	2008	Curse, Xavier Naidoo	Freiheit
"Im Herz"	2008	Franky Kubrick, Xavier Naidoo	Dramaking
"Siagst as"	2008	Hubert von Goisern, Xavier Naidoo	s'Nix
"Nothing Else Matters"	2008	Jazzkantine, Xavier Naidoo	Hell's Kitchen
"50 Ways to Leave Your Lover"	2008	Joana Zimmer, Xavier Naidoo	Showtime
"Sehnsucht"	2008	Schiller, Xavier Naidoo	Sehnsucht
"So leb' dein Leben"	2008	Tony Marshall, Xavier Naidoo	Wie nie
"All the Shakin'"	2009	Andreas Vollenweider, Xavier Naidoo	Air
"Lass mich nicht hier"	2009	Cassandra Steen, Xavier Naidoo	Darum leben wir
"Bettler & König"	2009	Karel Gott, Xavier Naidoo	Leben
"Großes Problem"	2009	Monroe, Xavier Naidoo, Samy Deluxe	Movement
"Der Mond ist aufgegangen"	2009	Pe Werner, Xavier Naidoo	Im Mondrausch
"Mein Traum"	2009	Tone, Xavier Naidoo	Phantom
"Liebe bringt den Schmerz"	2009	Vicky Leandros, Xavier Naidoo	Möge der Himmel
"Spiegel"	2010	Bligg, Xavier Naidoo	Bart aber herzlich
"Schöner Tod"	2010	Marq, Xavier Naidoo	Wunder
"Mein Weltbild"	2010	Olli Banjo, Xavier Naidoo	Kopfdisco
"Was bringt unsere Liebe um?"	2011	Kitty Kat, Xavier Naidoo	Pinkmafia
"Believer"	2011	Marla Glen, Xavier Naidoo	Humanology

=== Soundtrack ===
Title	Year	Artist(s)	Film
"Sie sieht mich nicht"	1999	Xavier Naidoo	Astérix & Obélix Take On Caesar
"Alles"	2000	Sabrina Setlur, Xavier Naidoo	Anatomy
"One Way"	2006	Xavier Naidoo	One Way
"Wild vor Wut"	2010	Xavier Naidoo	Animals United
