= Sabrina Setlur discography =

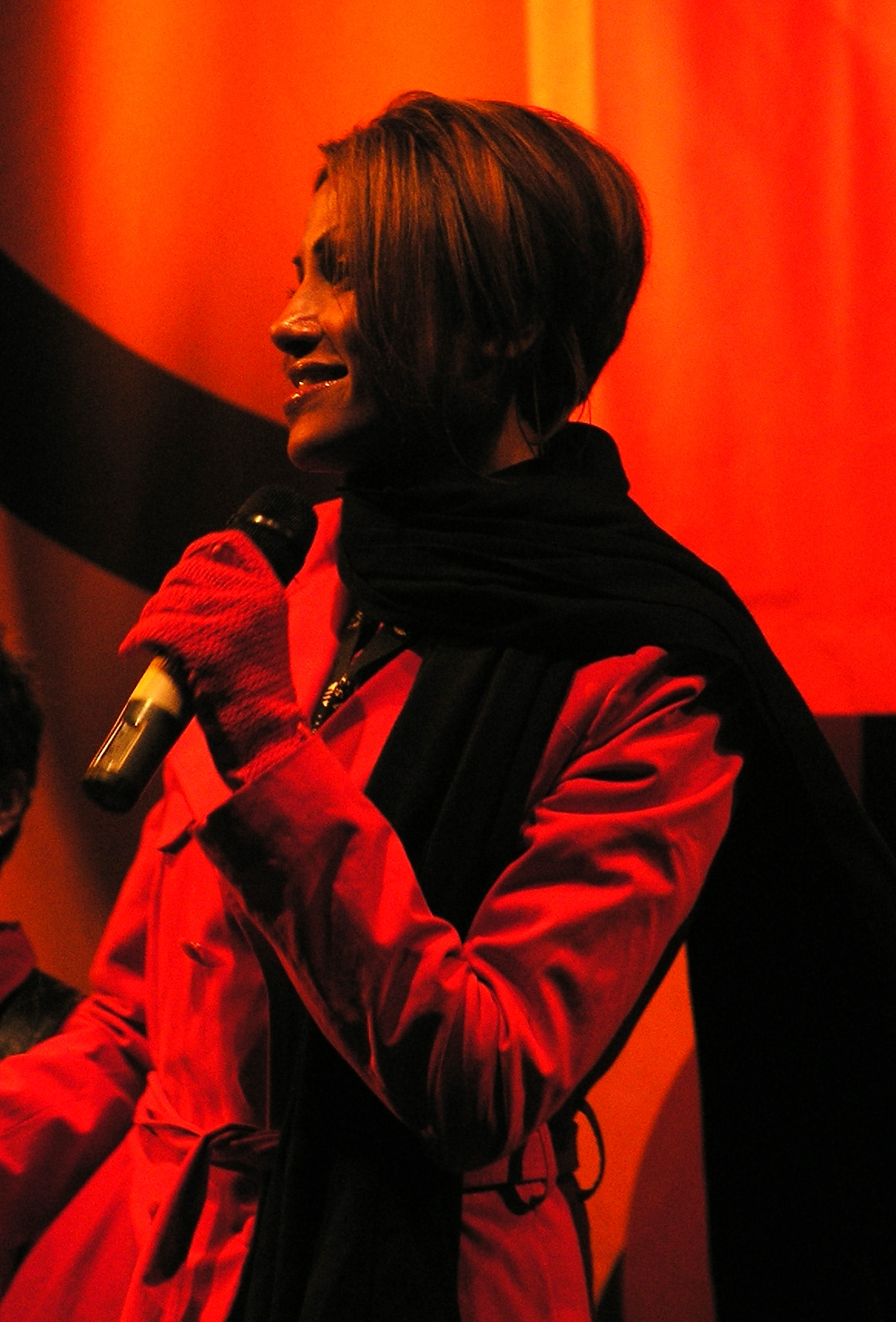
- Setlur in 2007
- Studio albums: 5
- Compilation albums: 1
- Singles: 20

This is the discography of German rapper Sabrina Setlur.

== Albums ==
=== Studio albums ===
List of albums, with selected chart positions and certifications
Title	Album details	Peak chart positions			Certifications
Title	Album details	GER	AUT	SWI	Certifications
S ist soweit	Released: 6 February 1995; Label: 3P; Formats: CD	11	—	—	
Die neue S-Klasse	Released: 24 March 1997; Label: 3P; Formats: CD	10	19	19	GER: Gold
Aus der Sicht und mit den Worten von...	Released: 1 October 1999; Label: 3P; Formats: CD, digital download	3	29	26	GER: Gold
Sabs	Released: 3 November 2003; Label: 3P; Formats: CD, digital download	11	65	74	
Rot	Released: 24 August 2007; Label: 3P; Formats: CD, digital download	32	—	100	

=== Compilation albums ===
List of albums, with selected chart positions and certifications
Title	Album details	Peak chart positions			Certifications
Title	Album details	GER	AUT	SWI	Certifications
10 Jahre – Das Beste von 1995 bis 2004	Released: 24 January 2005; Label: 3P; Formats: CD	61	—	—	

== Singles ==
=== As lead artist ===
List of singles as lead artist, with chart positions and certifications, showing year released and album name
Title	Year	Peak chart positions			Certifications	Album
Title	Year	GER	AUT	SWI	Certifications	Album
"Hier kommt die Schwester" / "Pass auf"	1995	—	—	—		S ist soweit
"Ja klar" (featuring Rödelheim Hartreim Projekt)	1995	14	—	—		S ist soweit
"Du liebst mich nicht"	1997	1	3	3	BVMI: Gold	Die neue S-Klasse
"Glaubst du mir?"	1997	17	—	31		Die neue S-Klasse
"Nur mir"	1997	27	—	—		Die neue S-Klasse
"Freisein" (introducing Xavier Naidoo)	1997	23	—	—		Die neue S-Klasse
"Folge dem Stern" (featuring Illmat!c and Bruda Sven)	1998	99	—	—		Die neue S-Klasse
"Ich leb' für Dich"	1999	27	—	43		Aus der Sicht und mit den Worten von …
"Hija" (featuring Cora E. and Brixx)	1999	35	—	—		Aus der Sicht und mit den Worten von …
"Letzte Bitte"	2000	81	—	—		Aus der Sicht und mit den Worten von …
"Alles" (featuring Xavier Naidoo)	2000	16	—	86		non-album single
"Keine ist"	2001	54	—	—		Pop 2001
"Ich bin so"	2003	23	63	89		Sabs
"Liebe" (featuring Glashaus and Franziska)	2003	52	—	—		Sabs
"Baby"	2004	22	—	—		Sabs
"Mein Herz"	2005	65	—	—		Sabs
"Lauta"	2007	25	—	—		Rot
"I Think I Like It"	2007	85	—	—		Rot
"—" denotes a recording that did not chart or was not released in that territory.

=== As featured performer ===
Year	Title	Chart Positions		Album
Year	Title	GER	SWI	Album
1999	"Bring My Family Back" (Faithless featuring Sabrina Setlur)	48	39	Sunday 8PM / Saturday 3AM
