= List of number-one hits of 2005 (Germany) =

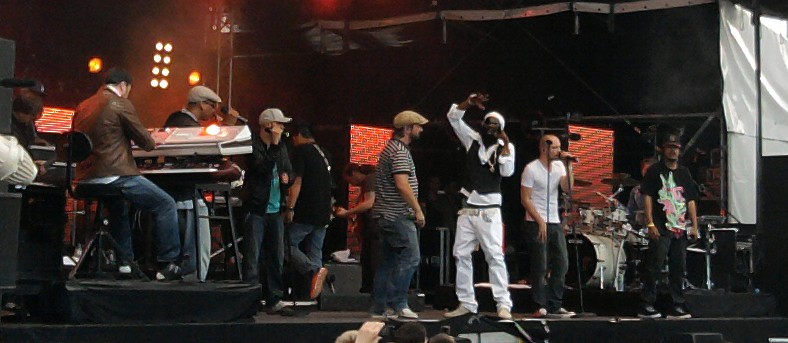
Schnappi's "Schnappi, das kleine Krokodil" became the best-performing single of 2005, while Söhne Mannheims's "Noiz" became the best-performing album of the year.

This is a list of songs which reached number one on the German Media Control Top100 Singles chart in 2005.

== Number-one hits by week ==
Key
†	Indicates best-performing single and album of 2005

Issue date	Song	Artist	Ref.	Album	Artist	Ref.
3 January	"Schnappi, das Kleine Krokodil"†	Schnappi		Greatest Hits	Robbie Williams	
10 January	"Schnappi, das Kleine Krokodil"†	Schnappi		Greatest Hits	Robbie Williams	
17 January	"Schnappi, das Kleine Krokodil"†	Schnappi		Your Dark Side	Nu Pagadi	
24 January	"Schnappi, das Kleine Krokodil"†	Schnappi		Max Mutzke	Max Mutzke	
31 January	"Schnappi, das Kleine Krokodil"†	Schnappi		Noiz†	Söhne Mannheims	
7 February	"Schnappi, das Kleine Krokodil"†	Schnappi		Noiz†	Söhne Mannheims	
14 February	"Schnappi, das Kleine Krokodil"†	Schnappi		Laut & leise	Peter Maffay	
21 February	"Schnappi, das Kleine Krokodil"†	Schnappi		Laut & leise	Peter Maffay	
28 February	"Schnappi, das Kleine Krokodil"†	Schnappi		Laut & leise	Peter Maffay	
7 March	"Schnappi, das Kleine Krokodil"†	Schnappi		Nahaufnahme	Westernhagen	
14 March	"Liebe ist"	Nena		Nahaufnahme	Westernhagen	
21 March	"From Zero to Hero"	Sarah Connor		The Massacre	50 Cent	
28 March	"Liebe ist"	Nena		Unterwegs	Yvonne Catterfeld	
4 April	"From Zero to Hero"	Sarah Connor		Naughty but Nice	Sarah Connor	
11 April	"From Zero to Hero"	Sarah Connor		Am Ende der Sonne	Farin Urlaub	
18 April	"Let Me Love You"	Mario		Von hier an blind	Wir Sind Helden	
25 April	"Candy Shop"	50 Cent featuring Olivia		Live in Hamburg	Bohse Onkelz	
2 May	"Candy Shop"	50 Cent featuring Olivia		Von hier an blind	Wir Sind Helden	
9 May	"Candy Shop"	50 Cent featuring Olivia		Devils & Dust	Bruce Springsteen	
16 May	"Cowboy"	Ch!pz		Devils & Dust	Bruce Springsteen	
23 May	"Cowboy"	Ch!pz		Von hier an blind	Wir Sind Helden	
30 May	"Lonely"	Akon		Mezmerize	System of a Down	
6 June	"Lonely"	Akon		Mezmerize	System of a Down	
13 June	"Lonely"	Akon		Monkey Business	The Black Eyed Peas	
20 June	"Lonely"	Akon		X&Y	Coldplay	
27 June	"Lonely"	Akon		Never Gone	Backstreet Boys	
4 July	"Lonely"	Akon		La Ultima / Live in Berlin	Bohse Onkelz	
11 July	"Lonely"	Akon		X&Y	Coldplay	
18 July	"Lonely"	Akon		X&Y	Coldplay	
25 July	"Maria"	US5		X&Y	Coldplay	
1 August	"Maria"	US5		Fijación Oral, Vol. 1	Shakira	
8 August	"Maria"	US5		Power of the Sound	Söhne Mannheims	
15 August	"Maria"	US5		Banaroo's World	Banaroo	
22 August	"La Camisa Negra"	Juanes		Power of the Sound	Söhne Mannheims	
29 August	"Durch den Monsun"	Tokio Hotel		Mi sangre	Juanes	
5 September	"Durch den Monsun"	Tokio Hotel		Mi sangre	Juanes	
12 September	"Durch den Monsun"	Tokio Hotel		Mi sangre	Juanes	
19 September	"Durch den Monsun"	Tokio Hotel		A Bigger Bang	The Rolling Stones	
26 September	"Durch den Monsun"	Tokio Hotel		A Bigger Bang	The Rolling Stones	
3 October	"Don't Cha"	Pussycat Dolls featuring Busta Rhymes		Have a Nice Day	Bon Jovi	
10 October	"Don't Cha"	Pussycat Dolls featuring Busta Rhymes		Have a Nice Day	Bon Jovi	
17 October	"Tripping"	Robbie Williams		Have a Nice Day	Bon Jovi	
24 October	"Tripping"	Robbie Williams		Schrei	Tokio Hotel	
31 October	"Tripping"	Robbie Williams		Playing the Angel	Depeche Mode	
4 November	"First Day of My Life"	Melanie C		Intensive Care	Robbie Williams	
11 November	"First Day of My Life"	Melanie C		Rosenrot	Rammstein	
18 November	"Hung Up"	Madonna		Intensive Care	Robbie Williams	
25 November	"Hung Up"	Madonna		Confessions on a Dance Floor	Madonna	
2 December	"Hung Up"	Madonna		Confessions on a Dance Floor	Madonna	
9 December	"Hung Up"	Madonna		Telegramm für X	Xavier Naidoo	
16 December	"Hung Up"	Madonna		Telegramm für X	Xavier Naidoo	
23 December	"Hung Up"	Madonna		Telegramm für X	Xavier Naidoo	
30 December	"Hung Up"	Madonna		Intensive Care	Robbie Williams	

== See also ==
- List of number-one hits (Germany)
- List of German airplay number-one songs
