= SABS =

SABS may refer to:

- South African Boilermakers' Society, a former trade union
- South African Bureau of Standards
- Southern Appalachian Botanical Society
- St. Andrews Biological Station, a Fisheries and Oceans Canada research centre
- Stabilised Automatic Bomb Sight, a World War II bombsight used by the RAF Bomber Command
- Sultan Abu Bakar School, Pahang, Malaysia
- Sisters of the Adoration of the Blessed Sacrament, a congregation of the Syro-Malabar Catholic Church, founded in 1908 by Thomas Kurialacherry

== See also ==
- Sabs, a 2003 album by Sabrina Setlur
