= Nicht von dieser Welt 2 =

Studio album by Xavier Naidoo
- Released: 1 April 2016
- Genres: Pop; soul; R&B
- Label: Naidoo
- Producers: Martin Haas; Moses Pelham

Xavier Naidoo chronology
Tanzmusik (2014)	Nicht von dieser Welt 2 (2016)	Nicht von dieser Welt 2 - Allein mit Flügel live (2016)

Nicht von dieser Welt 2 ("Not from This World 2") is the sixth studio album by German singer Xavier Naidoo, released via his Naidoo Records label on 1 April 2016 in German-speaking Europe. Titled as the sequel and serving as a thematical extension to his 1998 breakthrough album Nicht von dieser Welt, it marked Naidoo's reunion with long-time contributor and former mentor Moses Pelham, who wrote and executive produced most of the album with his songwriting collective.

Upon its release, Nicht von dieser Welt 2 debuted atop the album charts in Austria, Germany, and Switzerland, becoming Naidoo's second album to do so following 2005's Telegramm für X. However, though it has since been certified gold by the Bundesverband Musikindustrie (BVMI), indicating sales in excess of 100,000 copies, the album ranks among his lowest-selling albums. Nicht von dieser Welt 2 produced several regular and promotional singles of which leading single "Frei" became the only one to chart, reaching number 64 on the German Singles Chart.

== Track listing ==
Standard edition
No.	Title	Writer(s)	Length
1.	"Nicht von dieser Welt – Die Rückkehr"	Moses Pelham; Martin Haas; Xavier Naidoo	2:56
2.	"Renaissance der Liebe"	Pelham; Haas; Naidoo	3:57
3.	"In meinen Armen"	Pelham; Haas; Naidoo; Markus Onyuru	5:27
4.	"Der Fels"	Pelham; Haas; Onyuru	4:23
5.	"Das lass' ich nicht zu"	Pelham; Haas; Naidoo	4:41
6.	"Dem Himmel noch näher"	Pelham; Haas	4:52
7.	"Kopf" (featuring Moses Pelham)	Pelham; Haas	3:56
8.	"Frei"	Pelham; Haas	4:09
9.	"Wiedersehen"	Pelham; Haas	5:03
10.	"Ich will leben"	Pelham; Haas; Onyuru	4:47
11.	"Das Prinzip" (featuring Moses Pelham)	Pelham; Haas; Bayz Benzon	4:56
12.	"Latein"	Pelham; Haas; Naidoo	4:25
13.	"Nicht von dieser Welt – Epilog"		1:42
14.	"Amazing Grace"	John Newton	2:44

Deluxe edition
No.	Title	Writer(s)	Length
15.	"Mit Dir"	Pelham; Haas; Benzon	4:13
16.	"Zeichen (Dann Los)"	Pelham; Haas; Naidoo	4:04
17.	"Kein Land"	Pelham; Haas; Naidoo	4:10
18.	"Noch immer mehr als Gold wert"	Pelham; Haas; Naidoo	4:14

== Charts ==
=== Weekly charts ===
Chart (2016)	Peak position
Austrian Albums (Ö3 Austria)	1
German Albums (Offizielle Top 100)	1
Swiss Albums (Schweizer Hitparade)	1

=== Year-end charts ===
Chart (2016)	Position
German Albums (Offizielle Top 100)	27
Swiss Albums (Schweizer Hitparade)	44

== Certifications ==
Region	Certification	Certified units/sales
Germany (BVMI)	Gold	100,000^{‡}
^{‡} Sales+streaming figures based on certification alone.

== Release history ==
Region	Date	Format	Label
Austria	1 April 2016	Digital download, CD	Naidoo Records
Germany	1 April 2016	Digital download, CD	Naidoo Records
Switzerland	1 April 2016	Digital download, CD	Naidoo Records
