= Drei =

Drei (German: "three") may refer to:

- Drei (Glashaus album), a 2005 album by pop band Glashaus
- Drei (Emika album) (stylised form: DREI), a 2015 album by electronic artist Emika
- Three (2010 film), a German film called Drei in German
- Drei Oesterreich, Austrian mobile phone provider

== People with the surname ==
- Alisa Drei (born 1978), Finnish figure skater
- José Luis Drei (born 1973), Brazilian football player
- Umberto Drei (1925–1996), Italian racing cyclist
