= Live in Hamburg =

Live in Hamburg may refer to:

- Live in Hamburg (Roger Chapman album), 1979
- Live in Hamburg (Maria McKee album), 2004
- Live in Hamburg (Böhse Onkelz album), 2004
- Live in Hamburg (Wishbone Ash album), 2007
- Live in Hamburg (Scooter Album), 2010
- Live in Hamburg (Saga album), 2016
