= Sabs =

Studio album by Sabrina Setlur
- Released: 3 November 2003
- Label: 3P
- Producer: Moses Pelham; Martin Haas

Sabrina Setlur chronology
Aus der Sicht und mit den Worten von… (1999)	Sabs (2003)	Rot (2007)

Sabs is the fourth studio album by German rapper Sabrina Setlur. Produced by Moses Pelham and Martin Haas, it was released by 3P on 2 November 2003 in German-speaking Europe, coinciding with Setlur's role as a judge on Popstars – Das Duell. Her first album in four years, it debuted and peaked at number 11 on the German Albums Chart, but was less successful than her previous albums.

== Track listing ==
All song written by Moses Pelham, and Martin Haas.

No.	Title	Writer(s)	Length
1.	"S muss weitergehen (Intro)"	Setlur; Pelham; Haas	1:43
2.	"Ich bin so"	Setlur; Pelham; Haas	4:16
3.	"Mein Herz"	Setlur; Pelham; Haas	4:06
4.	"Du bist auserwählt (Interlude)"	Setlur; Pelham; Haas	0:22
5.	"Die Auserwählte"	Setlur; Pelham; Haas	5:08
6.	"Was immer du da tust"	Setlur; Pelham; Haas; Illmatic	4:38
7.	"Am Tag danach (Interlude)"	Setlur; Pelham; Haas	0:19
8.	"Allein"	Setlur; Pelham; Haas	3:48
9.	"Bis ich wieder rappen will (Interlude)"	Setlur; Pelham; Haas	1:12
10.	"Setlurflow"	Setlur; Pelham; Haas	4:30
11.	"Feel So Bad"	Setlur; Pelham; Haas	4:10
12.	"Liebe" (featuring Glashaus & Franziska)	Setlur; Pelham; Haas	4:35
13.	"Keine macht S besser"	Setlur; Pelham; Haas	3:52
14.	"An alle" (featuring Moses Pelham, Illmat!c, Cassandra Steen & Franziska)	Setlur; Pelham; Haas; Illmatic	3:21
15.	"Wichtige Meldungen (Interlude)"	Setlur; Pelham; Haas	0:40
16.	"Das Wichtigste"	Setlur; Pelham; Haas; Illmatic	4:14
17.	"Ja!"	Setlur; Pelham; Haas	3:58
18.	"Baby"	Setlur; Pelham; Haas	3:35

== Charts ==
Chart (2003)	Peak position
Austrian Albums (Ö3 Austria)	65
German Albums (Offizielle Top 100)	11
Swiss Albums (Schweizer Hitparade)	74
