= Metal on Metal (song) =

1977 song by Kraftwerk

Song by Kraftwerk

from the album Trans-Europe Express
- Released: March 1977
- Recorded: 1976
- Studio: Kling Klang (Düsseldorf, Germany)
- Genre: Electronic; industrial-funk
- Length: 2:11
- Label: Kling Klang
- Composer: Ralf Hütter
- Producers: Ralf Hütter; Florian Schneider

"Metal on Metal" (German: "Metall auf Metall") is an instrumental by Kraftwerk from their 1977 album Trans-Europe Express. This track, combined with "Abzug", the track immediately succeeding it (and considered part of "Metal on Metal" on English pressings), forms an extended coda to "Trans-Europe Express".

== Sampling controversy ==
Producer Moses Pelham sampled two seconds of the song and re-used it in the 1997 song "Nur mir" performed by German rapper Sabrina Setlur. Pelham lost in court to Ralf Hütter and Florian Schneider of Kraftwerk for copyright infringement, but was acquitted after an appeal.

In a 2016, The Guardian reported that the court found in favor of Setlur. However, in July 2019, the European Court of Justice (ECJ) overturned the appeal, ruling in favour of Kraftwerk. The ruling means that samples which are recognisable infringe copyright law where no permission has been sought from the rightsholder. However, there is no infringement if the sample is unrecognisable. The case was referred back to the German court who gave the final decision. The German court decided that the sample was recognisable. However, as copyright law had changed in the meantime, this ruling only applied to the timeframe December 22, 2002 and June 7, 2021.

The new copyright law included an exception for pastiches. A new case was brought fourth through the German legal system and finally to the ECJ to determine how a pastiche is defined, and whether sampling can be considered a pastiche. On June 17, 2025, the Advocate General to the ECJ concluded that, while there isn't a strong case for a sampling to be considered a pastiche, current copyright law doesn't adequately provide a balance between the freedom of the arts and intellectual property protection and requested the court to do a more thorough analysis on this balance.
