= Glashaus (album) =

Album by Glashaus

Studio album by Glashaus
- Released: 2 April 2001
- Genre: Pop; soul; R&B
- Label: 3p; Intergroove
- Producer: Moses Pelham; Martin Haas

Glashaus chronology
Glashaus (2001)	Glashaus 2 (2002)

Glashaus (transl. Glass House or Greenhouse) is the debut studio album by German band Glashaus. It was released on 2 April 2001 via Pelham Power Productions (3p) and Intergroove Records. Produced by band members Moses Pelham, and Martin Haas, the album peaked at number 20 on the German Albums Chart and spawned the top five hit "Wenn das Liebe ist", which was certified gold by the Bundesverband Musikindustrie (BVMI).

== Track listing ==
No.	Title	Length
1.	"Weckruf"	2:08
2.	"Trost (es tut weh)"	4:36
3.	"Solange"	4:32
4.	"Was immer es ist"	3:32
5.	"Dann bin das ich"	4:06
6.	"Liebst du mich?"	3:37
7.	"Wenn das Liebe ist"	5:47
8.	"Dein Vater kommt"	4:50
9.	"Fliegen"	5:12
10.	"So anders"	4:37
11.	"Flieht aus der Mitte Babylons"	2:58
12.	"Nur du"	4:24
13.	"Wir sind eins"	4:13
14.	"Was immer jetzt geschieht"	4:46
15.	"Bis dann"	1:12

== Charts ==
=== Weekly charts ===
Chart (2001)	Peak position
German Albums (Offizielle Top 100)	20

=== Year-end charts ===
Chart (2001)	Position
German Albums (Offizielle Top 100)	48
