= Drei (Glashaus album) =

Studio album by Glashaus
- Released: 9 May 2005
- Recorded: 2004–2005
- Genre: Pop; soul; R&B
- Length: 69:21
- Label: 3p; Intergroove
- Producer: Moses Pelham; Martin Haas

Glashaus chronology
Glashaus 2 (2002)	Drei (2005)	Neu (2009)

Drei (Three) is the third studio album by German band Glashaus. Entirely written and produced by Moses Pelham and Martin Haas, it was released on 8 May 2005 via 3p Records. Drei debuted and peaked at number 4 on the German Albums Chart, becoming the trio's highest-charting album to date. It marked Cassandra Steen's final album with the band until her hiatus.

== Track listing ==
No.	Title	Length
1.	"Drei"	1:53
2.	"Ich komm' zu Dir"	3:28
3.	"Haltet die Welt an"	5:02
4.	"In mir"	4:19
5.	"Mos Lied"	4:03
6.	"Du"	3:09
7.	"Sag, dass das nicht wahr ist"	4:40
8.	"Das letzte Mal"	4:57
9.	"Mit aller Kraft"	4:37
10.	"Solange du da bist"	4:33
11.	"Bis zum Mond und zurück"	6:14
12.	"Is' nur Kino"	4:25
13.	"Glashausgroove"/"Neues Leben"	4:24
14.	"Wenn sie weint"	4:52
15.	"Ich liebe"	9:16

== Personnel ==
- Martin Haas - keyboard
- Ken Taylor - bass
- Raphael Zweifel - strings

== Production ==
- Executive producers: Martin Haas, Moses Pelham
- Producer: Martin Haas, Moses Pelham
- Vocal assistance: Ali & Stauros, Julian Dettmering, Philipp Heilmann, Paul-Jakob Dettmering, Karl Haas, Benjamin Haas-Formell, Maximilian Haas-Formell, Charles Simmons
- Mixing: Martin Haas, Moses Pelham
- Mixing assistance: Birger Pucs
- Mastering: Chris Athens
- A&R: Moses Pelham
- Art Direction: Jens Klingelhöfer, Nachtwandler, Moses Pelham

== Charts ==
=== Weekly charts ===
Chart (2005)	Peak position
German Albums (Offizielle Top 100)	4
Swiss Albums (Schweizer Hitparade)	61
