= Yasmin Yusuff =

Malay actress

- Born: Yasmin binti Yusuff; 1955 (age 70–71); Cardiff, Wales
- Education: University of Bradford
- Beauty pageant titleholder
- Title: Miss Kuala Lumpur Universe 1978; Miss Malaysia Universe 1978
- Hair colour: Dark brown
- Eye colour: Brown
- Major competitions: Miss Malaysia Universe 1978 (Winner); Miss Universe 1978 (Unplaced)

Yang Hormat Dato' Yasmin Yusuff, DIMP (born 1955), is a former beauty queen, veteran actress and singer in Malaysia. Yasmin is one of the few well-known Malay pageant contestants who won the Miss Universe Malaysia title back in 1978, she competed in Miss Universe 1978.

== Career ==
Yasmin is a Malay song singer and senior radio presenter. She has released two albums, Yasmin (1979) and Harapan (1981), and acted in TV dramas and movies. Among her films are Mekanik, Selubung, Ringgit Kassorga, Gol dan Gincu, Susuk, Hooperz and Pisau Cukur. She has been involved in producing Cuci the Musical 1 and 2, and Lat Kampung Boy the Musical. She has also been the owner of a casting agency since 1986.

Due to her mellifluous voice, she was roped in to do voice-overs for countless radio and TV advertisements. She was a part-time announcer for Radio 4 for 13 years till 1999, before joining Rediffusion and Encorp. Yusoff is also an award-winning DJ who was voted Most Popular Radio DJ in 1997 by a Malay Mail reader poll. That same year, she won the Malaysian Music Academy (AIM) award in recognition of her contributions to radio – the first and only time the award has been given out.

She represented Malaysia at the Miss Universe 1978 competition in Acapulco, Mexico, where she won second runner-up for Best National Costume.

== Personal life ==
Yasmin is the eldest of 3 daughters to a Malay Malaysian father and German mother. Her father was then studying in the United Kingdom. She graduated with a degree in Human Purposes and Communications from the University of Bradford, United Kingdom.

Yasmin completed her secondary education in Sultan Abu Bakar School (SABS), Kuantan.

Yasmin married her fiancé and long-time British boyfriend Amarjit Chhina.

== Discography ==
- Yasmin (1979)
  - Tom Tom Bak Johari Salleh (Dunia Muzik WEA Sdn Bhd)
  - Papaku Johari Salleh (Dunia Muzik WEA Sdn Bhd)
  - Boneka Johari Salleh (Dunia Muzik WEA Sdn Bhd)
  - Jangan Dikau Merenung Lagi Johari Salleh (Dunia Muzik WEA Sdn Bhd)
  - Kau Johari Salleh (Dunia Muzik WEA Sdn Bhd)
  - Dahaga Johari Salleh (Dunia Muzik WEA Sdn Bhd)
  - Gadis Kota Johari Salleh (Dunia Muzik WEA Sdn Bhd)
  - Tiada Guna Berpura Johari Salleh (Dunia Muzik WEA Sdn Bhd)
  - Kehilangan Johari Salle (Dunia Muzik WEA Sdn Bhd)
  - Azimat Johari Salleh (Dunia Muzik WEA Sdn Bhd)
- Harapan (1981)
  - Pahit Ku Sangka Manis
  - Goyang Goyang, Dansa Bersama
  - Cinta Pandang Pertama
  - Laguku Untuk Mu
  - Hati Yang Sepi
  - Meminta Pada Yang Ada
  - Sekarang Aku Gembira
  - Jangan Biarkan
  - Cinta Anak Muda
  - Sayang
  - Alive

== Honour ==
- Pahang
  - Knight Companion of the Order of the Crown of Pahang (DIMP) – Dato' (2008)
