= Rot (album) =

Studio album by Sabrina Setlur
- Released: 24 August 2007
- Recorded: July 2006 – August 2007
- Studio: USP Studios, Frankfurt
- Genre: Rap; hip-hop; electro
- Length: 67:08
- Label: 3p (No. 134)
- Producer: Martin Haas; Moses Pelham

Sabrina Setlur chronology
10 Jahre (2005)	Rot (2007)

Professional ratings
Review scores
Source	Rating
CD Starts	6/10 stars
CineastenTreff	2/4 stars
Laut.de	3/5 stars
LetMeEntertainYou	4/5 stars
Tiscali	3/5 stars
Valve Magazine	2.5/5 stars

Rot (German for Red) is the fifth studio album by German rapper Sabrina Setlur, released by 3p Records on 24 August 2007. It was entirely co-produced by Martin Haas and Moses Pelham, with additional contribution by Bayz Benzon. The album was critically acclaimed, but widely failed to receive any commercial success yet, becoming Setlur's lowest-charting studio album to date.

== Track listing ==
No.	Title	Length
1.	"Das Leben in Rot" (Intro)	1:31
2.	"Lauta"	4:33
3.	"Discolampen" (featuring Moses Pelham)	5:53
4.	"Rot"	4:31
5.	"I Think I Like It"	4:03
6.	"Lass mich los"	3:18
7.	"Überleben"	3:08
8.	"Dieses Mal"	5:20
9.	"Fühlt sich gut an"	4:10
10.	"Im roten Raum"	4:14
11.	"Als sei nix gewesen"	4:45
12.	"Bald vielleicht O.K."	4:25
13.	"Am Feuer"	5:31
14.	"Das Leben in Rot" (Outro)	7:30

== Credits and personnel ==
- Amir Amjee Azar — vocals
- Bayz Benzon — keyboard
- Karl Hass — vocals
- Martin Haas — keyboard, vocals
- Sebastian Hämer — vocals
- Kaye-Ree — vocals
- Kaygin — vocals
- Julia Liebe — vocals
- Alli Neander — guitar
- Charles Simmons — vocals
- Miriam Skroban — vocals
- Dominik Stegmüller — vocals
- Bergitta Victor — vocals

=== Production ===
- Concept: M. Pelham, S. Setlur
- Product coordination: M. Pelham
- Product communication: Liesa Bartolome, Alex Besparis, Melanie Buddenhagen, Gwen-Marie Eigenweill, Sascha Ewert, Christian Ficke, Hasan Günay, Felix Heiden, Luise Kemmner, Julia Martin, Markus Onyuru, M. Pelham, S. Setlur, Yvonne Setlur
- Business affairs & legal: Dr. Udo Kornmeier, Andreas Walter
- Mastering: Chris Athens (at Sterling Studios in New York City)
- Songbook: G. Eigenweill, S. Ewert, M. Pelham, Jens Wurche
- Logo & artwork: H. Günay, M. Pelham
- Photography: Katja Kuhl

== Charts ==
Chart (2007)	Peak position
German Albums (Offizielle Top 100)	32
Swiss Albums (Schweizer Hitparade)	100
