= Bei meiner Seele =

Studio album by Xavier Naidoo
- Released: 31 May 2013
- Genres: Pop; soul; R&B
- Label: Naidoo
- Producer: Jules Kalmbacher

Xavier Naidoo chronology
Mordsmusik (2013)	Bei meiner Seele (2013)	Tanzmusik (2014)

Bei meiner Seele ("Upon My Soul") is the fifth studio album by German singer Xavier Naidoo, released on his Naidoo Records label on 31 May 2013 in German-speaking Europe.

== Track listing ==
All songs produced by Jules Kalmbacher.

No.	Title	Writer(s)	Length
1.	"Bei meiner Seele (DJ Release Remix)"	Naidoo; Kalmbacher; Alexander Laios	3:43
2.	"Höchste Zeit"	Naidoo; Kalmbacher	2:58
3.	"Junge"	Farin Urlaub	3:33
4.	"Autonarr"	Naidoo; Kalmbacher	3:07
5.	"Hört, hört"	Naidoo; Kalmbacher	3:33
6.	"Der letzte Blick"	Naidoo; Kalmbacher	3:47
7.	"Das Aufgebot"	Naidoo; Kalmbacher	4:46
8.	"Phrasen für dich"	Naidoo; Kalmbacher	2:21
9.	"So schön wie früher"	Naidoo; Kalmbacher	4:42
10.	"Stiller (Teilhaber)"	Naidoo; Kalmbacher	3:49
11.	"Woran kann ich den Menschen erkennen"	Naidoo; Kalmbacher	4:04
12.	"Deine Last" (featuring Moses Pelham)	Naidoo; Kalmbacher; Pelham	5:09
13.	"Bei meiner Seele"	Naidoo; Kalmbacher	4:50

== Charts ==
=== Weekly charts ===
Chart (2013)	Peak position
Austrian Albums (Ö3 Austria)	1
German Albums (Offizielle Top 100)	1
Swiss Albums (Schweizer Hitparade)	3

=== Year-end charts ===
Chart (2013)	Position
Austrian Albums (Ö3 Austria)	29
German Albums (Offizielle Top 100)	17
Swiss Albums (Schweizer Hitparade)	64

== Certifications and sales ==
Region	Certification	Certified units/sales
Austria (IFPI Austria)	Gold	7,500^{*}
Germany (BVMI)	Platinum	200,000^{^}
^{*} Sales figures based on certification alone.^{^} Shipments figures based on certification alone.

== Release history ==
Region	Date	Format	Label
Austria	31 May 2013	Digital download, CD	Naidoo Records
Germany	31 May 2013	Digital download, CD	Naidoo Records
Switzerland	31 May 2013	Digital download, CD	Naidoo Records
