= Hin und weg (album) =

Studio album by Xavier Naidoo
- Released: 19 July 2019
- Label: Naidoo

Xavier Naidoo chronology
Für dich. (2017)	Hin und weg (2019)

Hin und weg (German: Back and Forth) is the eighth studio album by German singer Xavier Naidoo, released via Naidoo Records on 19 July 2019 in German-speaking Europe. Upon its release, it debuted at number three on the German Albums Chart.

== Track listing ==
No.	Title	Writer(s)	Producer(s)	Length
1.	"Alle meine Sinne"	Xavier Naidoo; Joachim Piehl; Levin Dennler; Martin Peter Willumeit; Jonas Nikolaus Lang	Jugglerz	4:19
2.	"Anmut" (featuring Klotz)	Naidoo; Piehl; Jonathan Selle; Salvatore Mineo; Willumeit; Lang	Jugglerz	3:29
3.	"Aufgeregt"	Naidoo; David Hofmann; Piehl; Willumeit; Lang	Jugglerz	4:06
4.	"Blut, Schweiss und Tränen"	Naidoo; Piehl; Willumeit; Lang	Jugglerz	3:28
5.	"Diese Eine"	Naidoo; Hofmann; Piehl; Willumeit; Lang	Jugglerz	4:07
6.	"Eine Nacht"	Naidoo; Piehl; Willumeit; Lang	Jugglerz	2:55
7.	"Gute Zeiten" (featuring MoTrip)	Naidoo; Piehl; Philip Meckseper; Willumeit; Lang; Mohamed Moussaoui	Jugglerz; Jr Blender	3:35
8.	"Ich danke allen Menschen"	Naidoo; Hofmann; Piehl; Willumeit; Lang	Jugglerz	3:05
9.	"Ich packe meine Sachen"	Naidoo; Hofmann; Piehl; Willumeit; Lang; Tim Wilke; David Kraft	Jugglerz; The Cratez	3:43
10.	"Keine Meile"	Naidoo; Piehl; Levin Dennler; Willumeit; Lang	Jugglerz; Wainvel	3:10
11.	"Königin" (featuring Chefket)	Naidoo; Piehl; Sevket Dirican; Willumeit; Lang; Desiree Dorothy Mishoe	Jugglerz	3:37
12.	"Licht und Farbe"	Naidoo; Hofmann; Piehl; Willumeit; Lang	Jugglerz	3:28
13.	"Mein Glück ist besiegelt"	Naidoo; Piehl; Willumeit; Lang; Felix Volk	Jugglerz	3:24
14.	"Welt" (featuring Kontra K)	Naidoo; Piehl; Willumeit; Lang; Felix Volk; Maximilian Diehn	Jugglerz	4:47

== Charts ==
Chart (2019)	Peak position
Austrian Albums (Ö3 Austria)	8
German Albums (Offizielle Top 100)	3
Swiss Albums (Schweizer Hitparade)	4

== Release history ==
Region	Date	Format	Label
Austria	19 July 2019	Digital download, CD	Naidoo Records
Germany	19 July 2019	Digital download, CD	Naidoo Records
Switzerland	19 July 2019	Digital download, CD	Naidoo Records
