= Nicht von dieser Welt =

Studio album by Xavier Naidoo
- Released: 30 May 1998
- Studios: USP Tonstudios, Frankfurt am Main, Germany
- Genres: Pop; soul; R&B
- Length: 59:01
- Label: 3P
- Producers: Martin Haas; Moses Pelham

Xavier Naidoo chronology
Seeing Is Believing (1994)	Nicht von dieser Welt (1998)	Live (1999)

Nicht von dieser Welt ("Not from This World") is the debut studio album by German singer Xavier Naidoo, released on by Pelham Power Productions (3P) on 30 May 1998 in German-speaking Europe.

== Track listing ==
All songs produced by Moses Pelham and Martin Haas.

No.	Title	Writer(s)	Length
1.	"Seid ihr mit mir?"	Haas; Pelham	4:08
2.	"20.000 Meilen"	Naidoo; Haas; Pelham	3:33
3.	"Ernten was man sät"	Naidoo; Haas; Pelham; Michael Herberger	4:49
4.	"Führ mich ans Licht"	Naidoo; Kalmbacher	4:35
5.	"Könnt ihr mich hören?"	Haas; Pelham	6:27
6.	"Nicht von dieser Welt"	Naidoo; Richard Geppert	4:21
7.	"Freisein (Nachtschicht am Meer)"	Haas; Pelham; Setlur	5:20
8.	"Gute Aussichten" (featuring Moses Pelham)	Haas; Pelham	4:14
9.	"Flugzeuge im Bauch"	Herbert Grönemeyer	3:47
10.	"Ich kann dich sehen" (featuring Sabrina Setlur)	Naidoo; Haas; Pelham; Setlur	4:25
11.	"Mich belogen"	Naidoo; Kalmbacher	5:24
12.	"This Is Not America"	David Bowie; Pat Metheny; Lyle Mays	3:40
13.	"Eigentlich gut"	Naidoo; Haas; Pelham	4:12
14.	"Sag es laut"	Naidoo; Haas	2:46

== Charts ==
=== Weekly charts ===
Chart (1998–1999)	Peak position
Austrian Albums (Ö3 Austria)	5
German Albums (Offizielle Top 100)	1
Swiss Albums (Schweizer Hitparade)	12

=== Year-end charts ===
Chart (1998)	Position
German Albums (Offizielle Top 100)	17
Chart (1999)	Position
Austrian Albums (Ö3 Austria)	11
German Albums (Offizielle Top 100)	2
Swiss Albums (Schweizer Hitparade)	28

== Certifications and sales ==
Region	Certification	Certified units/sales
Austria (IFPI Austria)	Platinum	50,000^{*}
Germany (BVMI)	2× Platinum	1,000,000^{^}
Switzerland (IFPI Switzerland)	Platinum	50,000^{^}
^{*} Sales figures based on certification alone.^{^} Shipments figures based on certification alone.

== Release history ==
Region	Date	Format	Label
Austria	30 May 1998	Digital download, CD	3P
Germany	30 May 1998	Digital download, CD	3P
Switzerland	30 May 1998	Digital download, CD	3P
