= Seeing Is Believing (album) =

Studio album by Xavier Naidoo
- Released: 7 September 1994
- Genre: Pop; soul; R&B
- Label: Megaphon
- Producer: Nicole Dürr

Xavier Naidoo chronology
Seeing Is Believing (1994)	Nicht von dieser Welt (1998)

Seeing Is Believing is the debut studio album by German singer Xavier Naidoo, released by Megaphon Music on 7 September 1994 in the United States.

== Track listing ==
No.	Title	Writer(s)	Length
1.	"In Every Head"		3:59
2.	"Seeing Is Believing"		3:02
3.	"Wet Eyes"		4:59
4.	"The Game"		4:22
5.	"Passion"		3:54
6.	"Crying"		4:12
7.	"Good-Bye"		4:13
8.	"Who I Am"		3:34
9.	"It's Over"		4:37
10.	"Ave Maria"		5:42
11.	"Stand By Me"	Naidoo; Kalmbacher	1:50

== Release history ==
Region	Date	Format	Label
United States	7 September 1994	Digital download, CD	Megaphon Music
