= Für dich. (Xavier Naidoo album) =

2017 album

Studio album by Xavier Naidoo
- Released: 24 November 2017
- Genre: Pop; soul; R&B
- Label: Naidoo

Xavier Naidoo chronology
Nicht von dieser Welt 2 - Allein mit Flügel live (2016)	Für dich. (2017)	Hin und weg (2019)

Für dich. ("For You.") is the seventh studio album by German singer Xavier Naidoo, released by Naidoo Records on 24 November 2017 in German-speaking Europe. Upon its release, it debuted at number three on the German Albums Chart. It had been Naidoo's first album for 20 years that failed to top the charts.

== Track listing ==
No.	Title	Length
1.	"Nimm mich mit"	3:57
2.	"Zuhause"	3:57
3.	"Für dich"	3:59
4.	"Allein"	3:47
5.	"Gib mir Liebe"	3:10
6.	"Drück diesem Leben deinen Stempel auf"	4:24
7.	"Bei dir sein"	4:01
8.	"Stille"	4:57
9.	"Solange ich noch darf"	3:35
10.	"Hoch entwickelt"	3:58
11.	"Tropfen für Tropfen"	3:51
12.	"Bereit für die Liebe"	4:42
13.	"Was ist schon für immer"	3:54
14.	"Mach dir keine Sorgen"	4:08

== Charts ==
=== Weekly charts ===
Chart (2017)	Peak position
Austrian Albums (Ö3 Austria)	6
German Albums (Offizielle Top 100)	3
Swiss Albums (Schweizer Hitparade)	5

=== Year-end charts ===
Chart (2017)	Position
German Albums (Offizielle Top 100)	89

== Release history ==
Region	Date	Format	Label
Austria	24 November 2017	Digital download, CD	Naidoo Records
Germany	24 November 2017	Digital download, CD	Naidoo Records
Switzerland	24 November 2017	Digital download, CD	Naidoo Records
