= Alles kann besser werden =

Studio album by Xavier Naidoo
- Released: 9 October 2009
- Genre: Pop; soul; R&B
- Label: Naidoo
- Producer: Xavier Naidoo; B. Davis; Mathias Grosch; Michael Herberger; Milan Martelli; Monroe; Neil Palmer; Rnrfactory; Aiko Rohd; Florian Sitzmann; Philippe van Eecke

Xavier Naidoo chronology
Wettsingen in Schwetzingen (2008)	Alles kann besser werden (2009)	Alles kann besser werden – Live (2010)

Alles kann besser werden ("Everything Can Get Better") is the fifth studio album by German singer Xavier Naidoo, released by Naidoo Records on 9 October 2009 in German-speaking Europe.

== Track listing ==
Hell 1 – Disc 1
No.	Title	Writer(s)	Producer(s)	Length
1.	"Alles kann besser werden"	Naidoo; Matthew Tasa; Milan Martelli; Janet Grogan	Martelli	3:41
2.	"Mut zur Veränderung" (with Danny Fresh)	Naidoo; Danny Fresh; Michi Vajna; Ruben Rodriguez	Rnrfactory	5:08
3.	"Sterne"	Naidoo; Mathias Grosch	Grosch	3:22
4.	"Alles lebt"	Naidoo; Philippe van Eecke	van Eecke	3:35
5.	"Der Kreis"	Naidoo; Michael Herberger	Naidoo; Herberger	4:50
6.	"Ich brauche dich"	Naidoo; Neil Palmer; Rodriguez; Ben Abarbanel-Wolff; Stu Krause	Rnrfactory	3:58
7.	"Meine Muse" (with Olli Banjo)	Naidoo; Rodriguez; Oliver Otubanjo	Rnrfactory	3:49
8.	"Shine Like a Star"	Naidoo; Herberger	Naidoo; Herberger	5:00
9.	"Wild vor Wut" (with Naturally 7)	Naidoo; Herberger	Naidoo; Herberger	3:10
10.	"Königin"	Naidoo; Herberger	Naidoo; Herberger	3:27
11.	"Sie kommt zurück"	Naidoo; Herberger	Naidoo; Herberger	3:58
12.	"Bitte hör nicht auf zu träumen"	Naidoo; Tasa; Martelli	Martelli	4:10

Hell 2 – Disc 2
No.	Title	Writer(s)	Producer(s)	Length
1.	"In Too Deep"	Naidoo; Metaphysics; Ernest Gold; W.T. Davis	B. Davis	3:50
2.	"Was hab ich falsch gemacht"	Naidoo; Palmer	Palmer	4:06
3.	"Ich warte bis du kommst"	Naidoo; Herberger	Naidoo; Herberger	4:30
4.	"Gib dich nicht auf"	Naidoo; Herberger	Naidoo; Herberger	4:57
5.	"Europa"	Naidoo; Palmer	Palmer	4:46
6.	"Halte durch"	Naidoo; Aiko Rohd	Rohd	4:00
7.	"Befreit"	Naidoo; Rohd	Rohd	4:24
8.	"Ich kann nicht weinen"	Naidoo; van Eecke	van Eecke	6:03
9.	"Für dich öffnen sie die Tore"	Naidoo; Palmer; Tino Oac; Davis; Azad Azadpour; Daniel Stoyanow; Toni Jurcic	B. Davis	5:19
10.	"So Calm"	Naidoo; Palmer; Davis	Palmer; Davis	6:02

DunkHell – Disc 3
No.	Title	Writer(s)	Producer(s)	Length
1.	"Intro: Du musst es nicht tun"	Naidoo; Martelli	Martelli	2:21
2.	"Das war noch nicht alles"	Naidoo; Palmer; Davis	Davis	3:50
3.	"Söldnerlied (Drogen und Gold)"	Naidoo; Rohd	Rohd	4:30
4.	"Sie verdienen einen besonderen Schutz"	Naidoo; Florian Sitzmann	Sitzmann	5:13
5.	"Schiff ahoi"	Naidoo; Davis; Grosch	Davis; Grosch	5:30
6.	"Holt die Seeleute heim"	Naidoo; Grosch	Grosch	5:27
7.	"Raus aus dem Reichstag"	Naidoo; Herberger	Naidoo; Herberger	6:22
8.	"Verschieden"	Naidoo; van Eecke	van Eecke	3:38
9.	"Goldwaagen/Goldwagen"	Naidoo; Herberger	Naidoo; Herberger	3:33
10.	"Aufklärungsarbeit"	Naidoo; Willem Bock; Detlev Nottodt; Matthias Thurow	Monroe	3:25
11.	"Ruth Maude"	Naidoo; Herberger	Naidoo; Herberger	3:25
12.	"Seltsamer Junge"	Naidoo; Herberger; Andreas Bayless	Naidoo; Herberger	4:06
13.	"Long and Winding Road"	Naidoo; Grosch	Grosch	4:06

== Charts ==
=== Weekly charts ===
Chart (2009)	Peak position
Austrian Albums (Ö3 Austria)	3
German Albums (Offizielle Top 100)	1
Swiss Albums (Schweizer Hitparade)	2

=== Year-end charts ===
Chart (2009)	Rank
Austrian Albums (Ö3 Austria)	58
German Albums (Official Top 100)	24
Swiss Albums (Schweizer Hitparade)	74
Chart (2010)	Rank
German Albums (Official Top 100)	8
Swiss Albums (Schweizer Hitparade)	87
Chart (2011)	Rank
German Albums (Official Top 100)	60

== Certifications and sales ==
Region	Certification	Certified units/sales
Germany (BVMI)	2× Platinum	400,000^{^}
Switzerland (IFPI Switzerland)	Gold	15,000^{^}
^{^} Shipments figures based on certification alone.

== Release history ==
Region	Date	Format	Label
Austria	9 October 2009	Digital download, CD	Naidoo Records
Germany	9 October 2009	Digital download, CD	Naidoo Records
Switzerland	9 October 2009	Digital download, CD	Naidoo Records
