= Sultan Abu Bakar School =

Sekolah Menengah Kebangasaan Sultan Abu Bakar
- SABS Kuantan

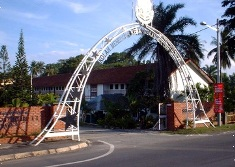
- Front entrance of school

Location
- Jalan Beserah, 25300 Kuantan; Kuantan, Pahang; Malaysia
- 3°49′34″N 103°20′15″E

Information
- Type: Secondary School
- Motto: Alah Bisa Tegal Biasa (Through Endeavour We Succeed)
- Established: August 16, 1957; 68 years ago
- Principal: Haji Asruddin Bin Haji.Abas
- Grades: Form 1 - Pre University
- Language: Malay
- Colours: Blue, yellow, red, white
- Publication: Citarasa

Sultan Abu Bakar School (SMK Sultan Abu Bakar/SABS/SMKSAB) is a secondary school situated in Kuantan, Pahang, Malaysia. It is entitled as a Premier School by the Malaysian Ministry of Education due to its excellence in academic and co-curriculum. Nowadays, the Ministry of Education accepts UPSR candidates who got Sekolah Kebangsaan(SK) not less than 3A and Sekolah Jenis Kebangsaan(SJK) not less than 5A.

== History ==
In 1955, when Kuantan was made the state capital, a new site was chosen for the school in Jalan Beserah. A site near Jalan Beserah, with the area of 10 acres (40,000 m^{2}), was the new site for the school. Construction started in 1956. The school was officially opened on 16 August 1957 by the then Sultan of Pahang, Al-Marhum Sultan Abu Bakar Riayathuddin Al Muadzam Shah Ibni Al-Marhum Sultan Abdullah Al Muktasim Billah. Datuk Idris bin Babjee was the first principal of the school.

== Motto ==
Through Endeavour We Succeed, "Alah Bisa Tegal Biasa"

== Gallery ==
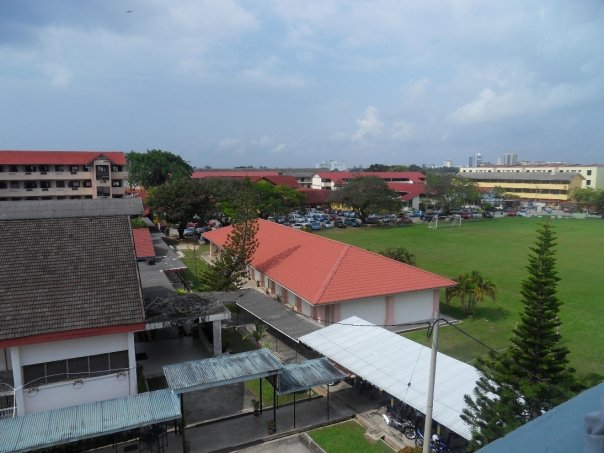
View From Block M

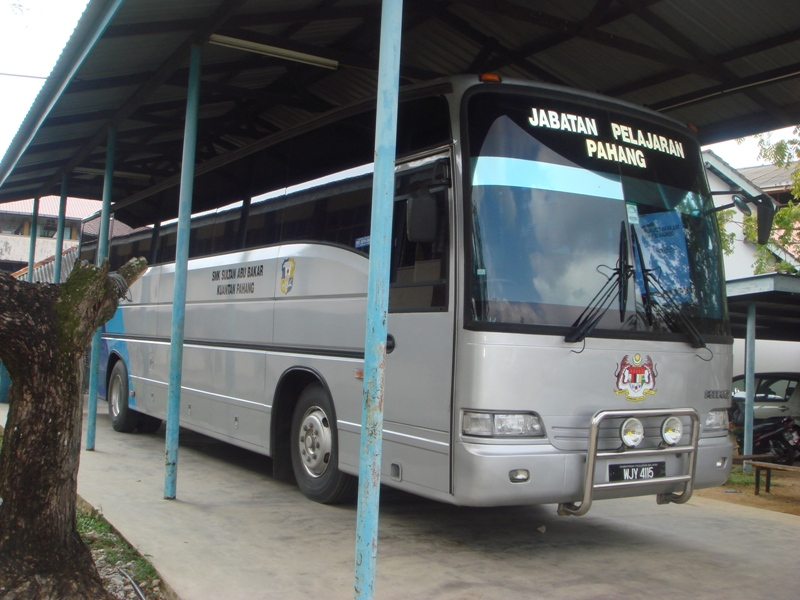
School bus

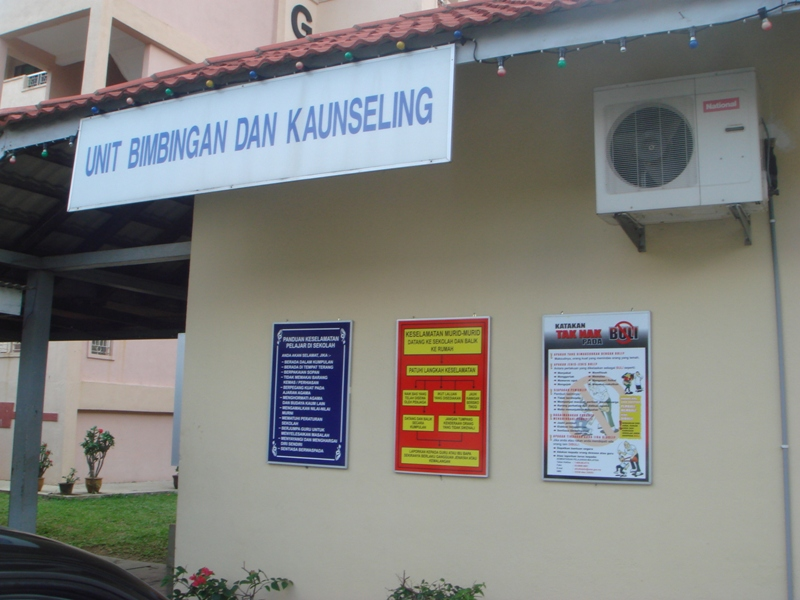
Bimbingan and Kaunseling

== Notable alumni ==
- Siti Zaharah Sulaiman - former Minister
- Jamaluddin Jarjis - former Malaysian Science, Technology and Innovation Minister
- Sudirman Arshad - Malaysian singer
- Yasmin Yusoff - former Miss Malaysia
- Colin Kirton - Malaysian actor/director * Weng Cho Chew - Malaysian-American distinguished professor of electrical engineering at Purdue University
