= Rödelheim Hartreim Projekt =

The Rödelheim Hartreim Projekt ("Rödelheim Hard-Rhyme Project"), for short RHP, was a mid-1990s German rap group from Rödelheim, a part of Frankfurt. The group comprised two members, Moses P. (Moses Pelham) and Thomas H. (Thomas Hofmann). They were among the first groups to garner commercial success by rapping in German, while stylistically leaning more towards American gangsta rap.

== Band history ==
Moses Pelham had already had moderate success as a teenager with his first English language single Twilight Zone in 1989, before hitting a brick wall in his attempts to market his self-produced second album. In 1993 he teamed up with his old friend Thomas Hofmann, whom he had met on a basketball court, to form the Rödelheim Hartreim Projekt. They recorded their album that year with producers Martin Haas, who had worked on Moses's unreleased second album, and Robert Sattler and supported by future stars Xavier Naidoo and Sabrina Setlur. The album, entitled Direkt aus Rödelheim ("Straight out of Rödelheim", an allusion to N.W.A's Straight Outta Compton), surprisingly sold an impressive 160,000 copies in 1994. In 1995, when Schwester S. (a.k.a. Sabrina Setlur) released her debut album, RHP collaborated with her on the single Ja Klar ("Yeah, right") which entered the Top 10 of the German Media Control charts.

In 1996 the group released their second and last album, Zurück nach Rödelheim ("Back to Rödelheim"), which entered the charts at 3rd position and sold 180,000 copies. The first single extracted from the album, Höha, Schnella, Weita ("Higha, Fasta, Furtha") received a lot of airplay and was also fairly successful. It was this year that Moses split with the group's former label, Universal Music, for his own new label, Pelham Power Productions (3p). From around then on, RHP factually ceased to exist, while Moses Pelham now concentrated on marketing his label's artists and on his own solo career.

== Discography ==
- Direkt aus Rödelheim (1994)
- Live aus Rödelheim (1995)
- Zurück nach Rödelheim (1996)
