= Sabrina Setlur =

German rapper

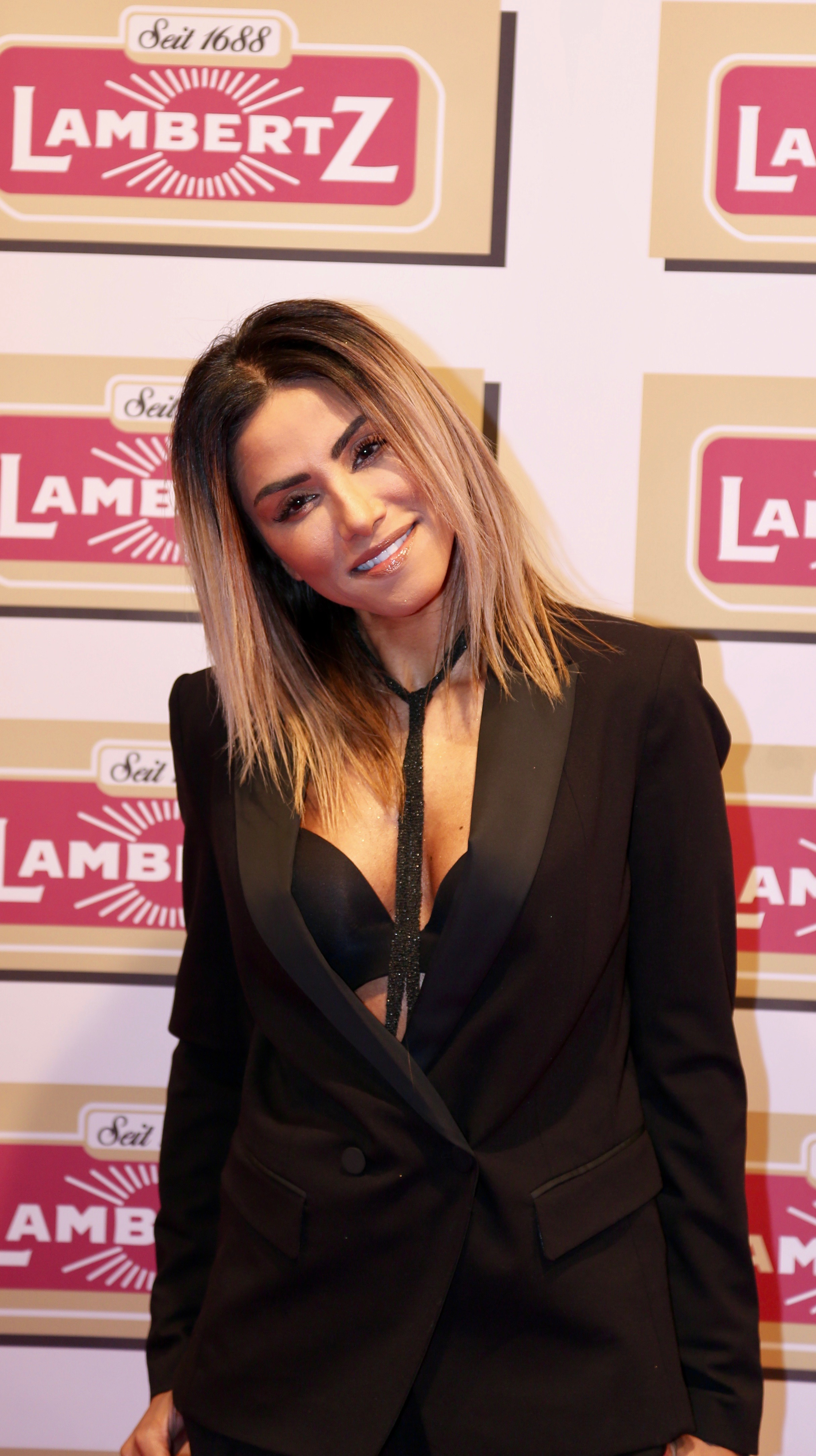
- Setlur at the Lambertz Monday Night 2017

Background information
- Also known as: Sabs, Schwester S.
- Born: 10 January 1974 (age 52); Frankfurt, West Germany
- Genres: Hip-hop, pop rap
- Occupations: Rapper, singer, songwriter
- Years active: 1993–present
- Label: 3p/Intergroove
- Website: sabrinasetlur.de

Sabrina Setlur (born 10 January 1974), formerly known as Schwester S., is a German rapper. Her debut was in 1995 under the guidance of 3p Records executive and mentor Moses Pelham, producer of her breakthrough single "Ja Klar". Following the drop of her pseudonym and a number-one single, "Du liebst mich nicht", in 1997, a series of hit records established her position as Germany's "best known and highest-selling female rap act" to date.

Setlur is the only artist to date to have ever won three ECHO Awards for "Best National Female Artist". According to several sources, she has sold more than two million albums and singles domestically.

Her most recent album was released in 2007.

== Early life ==
Setlur is the elder of two sisters born to Krishnan Setlur, a Kannadiga banker, and his wife Theresa, a Malayali nurse, in Frankfurt am Main, West Germany. She and her four-years-younger sister Yvonne were primarily raised in Bad Soden am Taunus, where Setlur became acquainted with future Rödelheim Hartreim Projekt members Thomas Hofmann and Moses Pelham in her high school years. After a spontaneous performance of Dr. Dre's "Nuthin' But a "G" Thang" in 1993 Hofmann and Pelham asked her to contribute a verse to the early Rödelheim Hartreim Projekt track "Wenn Es Nicht Hart Ist". As she had never rapped before, Setlur reportedly hesitated; but soon accepted their invitation into the recording studio. Impressed by her talent, Pelham offered her a record contract with Pelham Power Productions, and as a result Setlur quit studying business administration and instead signed a deal with 3p Records.

== Career ==
=== 1990s ===
In 1995, Setlur released the Moses Pelham-produced double A single "Hier kommt die Schwester/Pass auf" under the pseudonym Schwester S. Her breakthrough single was "Ja klar" from her debut album S ist soweit (ranking #11), which was released in February 1995. In 1996, she won the ECHO award for "Best Female Artist". In addition, she began her own hip-hop broadcast on the radio station hr3.

After 3p's sudden major label change in 1997, Setlur released her second album Die neue S-Klasse under her birth name in February of the same year. It debuted at #10 on the albums chart and spawned Setlur's first and only #1 single "Du liebst mich nicht", whose sales earned her another ECHO and a Comet award for "Best Female Artist" in 1998, as well as a golden record for more than 300.000 units sold. In the meantime, Setlur was featured on the singles by Faithless' "Bring My Family Back" and then-newcomer Xavier Naidoo's "Freisein".

In 1999, Setlur's third album Aus der Sicht und mit den Worten von... outperformed the success of its predecessors when it peaked at #3 on the German albums chart. Though its singles could not link to previous accomplishments, the album's sales earned Setlur her third ECHO for "Best Female Artist" in 2000. A few months later, she constantly hit the headlines when paparazzi revealed her relationship to former tennis star Boris Becker. The couple separated shortly afterwards, but due to conflicting rumours about anorexia, Setlur's name maintained popular in magazines and papers. "I was suddenly in the newspaper, not because of my job, only because we were together", said Setlur in an interview with online magazine Spiegel Online. "Suddenly they wrote stuff about me, which hasn't something to do with my job".

=== 2000s ===
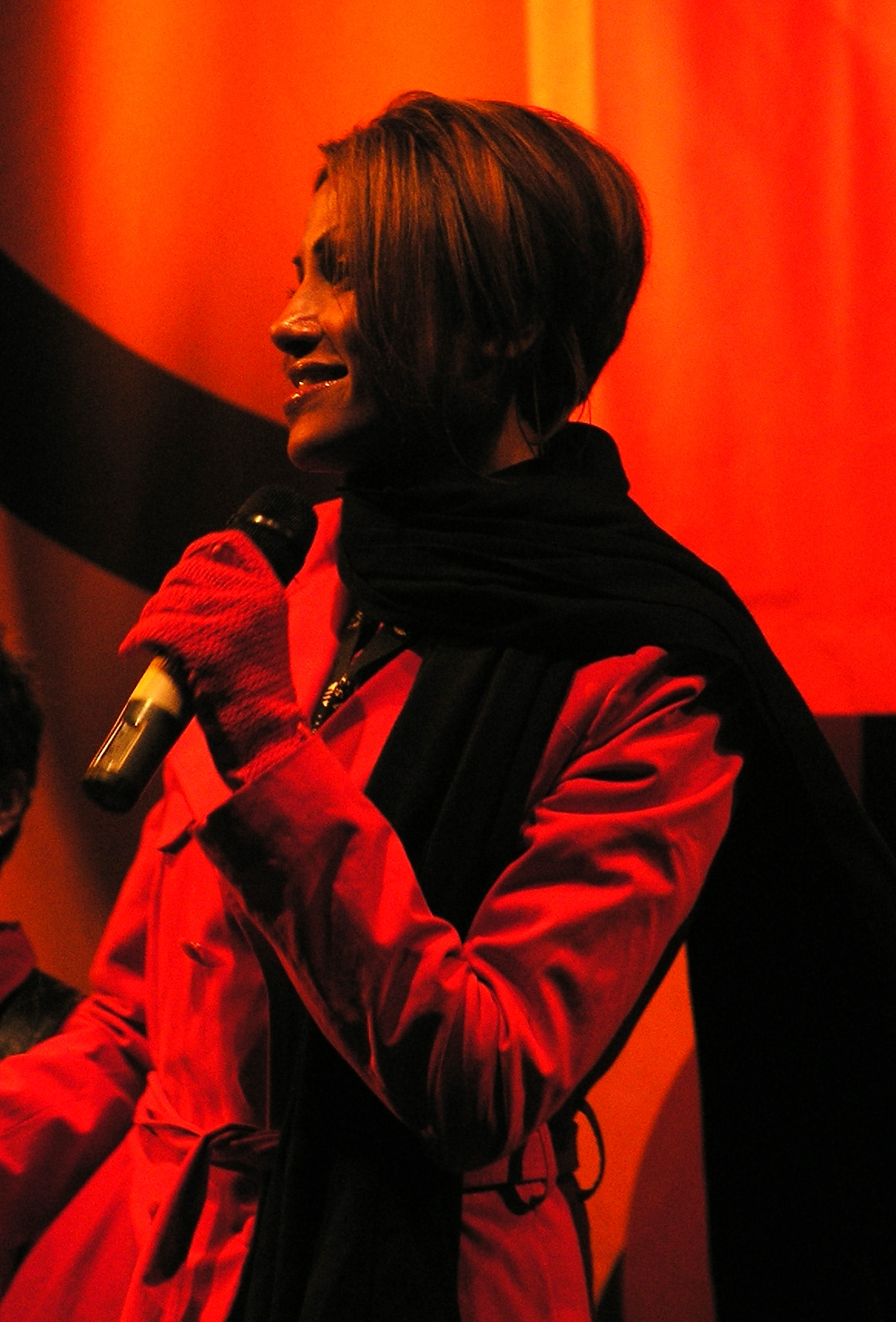
Setlur performing live in Wiesbaden in 2007

Setlur channeled much of her heavily media-discussed experiences into the production of her fourth studio album Sabs. Released in November 2003, the CD received a mixed reception from most professional music critics, with Laut calling it "a chavvy and antiquated [but] good rap album" and CDStarts declaring it a "insignificant [but] practiced comeback". Promoted by Setlur's engagement as a judge on the third installment of the German reality television series Popstars - Das Duell (which created both the male quartet Overground and the girl group Preluders), the album spawned four moderately successful singles, including "Liebe", a collaboration with Glashaus and labelmate Franziska. Setlur used to contend for the Eurovision Song Contest 2004 in Istanbul. Following several weeks of promotional appearances, Setlur entered the competition on 19 March 2004 with the album's second single, and although considered as a favourite by the media, Setlur failed to place within the top 5, eventually falling against singer Max Mutzke and his song "Can't Wait Until Tonight".

In early 2005, she released a best-of compilation titled 10 Jahre Sabrina Setlur. It features all of her singles (by then fifteen) as well as the album tracks "Ich bin raus" (taken from S ist soweit) and "Ohne Worte" (from Aus der Sicht und mit den Worten von...) but did not include new material. The song "Mein Herz", originally released on Sabs, was used as single to promote the album.

Returning from yet another musical hiatus, Setlur's fifth studio album Rot was released on 24 August 2007.

== Kraftwerk ==
In 1999, veteran band Kraftwerk filed a lawsuit against Sabrina Setlur's producers Moses Pelham and Martin Haas, for the use of a two-second sample from the song "Metal on Metal" on their 1977 album Trans-Europe Express in Setlur's 1997 song "Nur mir".

In May 2016, Kraftwerk lost in German court.

Though later in July 2019, Kraftwerk won the legal case in the European Court of Justice.

After the case went back through German courts, a new German copyright exception for "pastiche" took effect in June 2021. When the litigation returned to the European Court of Justice, the EU judges clarified in April 2026 that the "pastiche" exception allows for unauthorized sampling even if the sample remains recognizable, as long as it engages in a recognizable artistic or creative dialogue with the original work.

Because of this 2026 EU interpretation, Germany's Federal Court of Justice finalized the dismissal of Kraftwerk's remaining claims in September 2026.

== Discography ==
- S ist soweit (1995)
- Die neue S-Klasse (1997)
- Aus der Sicht und mit den Worten von... (1999)
- Sabs (2003)
- Rot (2007)

== Awards ==
- 1995 - Comet (VIVA): "Best Hip Hop Artist 1995"
- 1996 - ECHO: "Best National Artist 1995"
- 1997 - Comet (VIVA): "Best National Act 1997"
- 1998 - Comet (VIVA): "Best National Video" for "Glaubst Du mir"
- 1998 - ECHO: "Best National Artist 1997"
- 1999 - Silber Otto: "Best Hip Hop Act"
- 1999 - RSH-Gold: "Best Teamwork" (with Xavier Naidoo)
- 2000 - Goldene Kamera: "Outstanding Achievements in German Pop Music"
- 2000 - Regenbogen Award: "Most Valuable Artist in Hip Hop"
- 2000 - ECHO: "Best National Artist"
- 2008 - German Multimedia Award for her website rot.fm (supporting her fifth studio album Rot)
