= Live in Hamburg (Böhse Onkelz album) =

Live album by Böhse Onkelz
- Released: 2005
- Recorded: 5 October 2004
- Genre: Hard rock
- Length: 150:32
- Label: Rule23
- Producer: Stephan Weidner

Böhse Onkelz chronology
Adios	Live in Hamburg	La Ultima / Live in Berlin

Professional ratings
Review scores
Source	Rating
CDStarts.de	(9/10)

Live in Hamburg is the fifth live album by German rock band Böhse Onkelz. It was recorded on 5 October 2004 at the Color Line Arena in Hamburg. The concert was the last concert of the tournament "La Ultima".

== Track listing ==
=== CD 1 ===
1. Intro
2. Hier sind die Onkelz
3. Lieber stehend sterben
4. Finde die Wahrheit
5. Ich bin in dir
6. Buch der Erinnerung
7. Danket dem Herrn
8. Ja, Ja
9. Onkelz vs. Jesus
10. Wieder mal 'nen Tag verschenkt
11. Terpentin
12. Nichts ist für die Ewigkeit
13. Firma
14. Danke für nichts
15. Superstar

=== CD 2 ===
1. Nur die Besten sterben jung
2. Nie wieder
3. Immer auf der Suche
4. Stunde des Siegers
5. So sind wir
6. Für immer (Version 2004)
7. Heilige Lieder
8. Gehasst, verdammt, vergöttert
9. Erinnerungen
10. Feuer
11. Auf gute Freunde
12. Kirche
13. Mexico
14. Ihr hättet es wissen müssen
15. A.D.I.O.Z

== Year-end charts ==
Year	Country	Chart	Rank
2005	Germany	IFPI	26
