= Söhne Mannheims =

German band

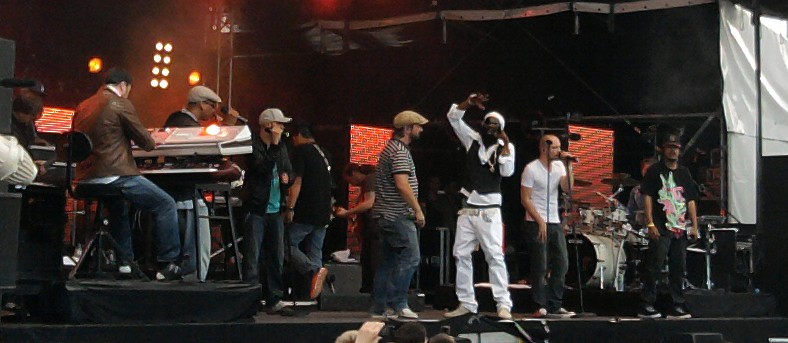
- Söhne Mannheims performing in 2010

Background information
- Origin: Mannheim, Germany
- Genres: Pop, soul, hip pop
- Years active: 1995-present
- Label: Söhne Mannheims (Edel Music)
- Members: Marlon B. FireVerse; Andreas Bayless; Ralf Gustke; Bernd Herrmann; Michael Klimas; Kosho; Henning Wehland; Metaphysics; Tino Oac; Florian Sitzmann
- Past members: Uwe Banton; Claus Eisenmann; Robbee Mariano; J-Luv; Jah MC; Jah Meek; Rolf Stahlhofen; Pbc; Edo Zanki; Billy Davis; Michael Herberger; Xavier Naidoo
- Website: soehne-mannheims.de

Söhne Mannheims (German: [ˈzøːnə ˈmanhaɪms]; Sons of Mannheim) is a German pop and soul band founded 1995 in Mannheim by Xavier Naidoo and others.

== History ==
The Group was founded in 1995 by Xavier Naidoo, Claus Eisenmann, Robbee Mariano and others.

In 2000 they released their first studio album Zion. The biggest hit from this album was "Geh Davon Aus" (it translates as "Assume That"). After several solo projects by the group members, they met in the studio to record their second album, Noiz. Their second big hit was the song "Und Wenn ein Lied" ("And When a Song"), which stood at number 2 on the German single-chart for the whole winter of 2005. After a lot of concerns, they released the live-album Power of the Sound.

With the Single Wenn du schläfst, which appeared early in 2005, they helped the project World Vision Deutschland and encouraged their fans to join with the slogan: "Erhebt eure Stimme gegen Armut!" ("Raise your voice against poverty!").

Claus Eisenmann left the band in 2006 because he appeared in a TV commercial and violated the band's philosophy. Eisenmann given reason was that Naidoo has led the band as a "dictator".

From the 12 January 2007 until the 10 February 2007 they made a Club-Tour through Europe. They began in Belgium with a stop in Bielefeld. On the concerts from this tour they sang songs from the album Iz On, which was released in 2009. The Concerts were fully sold out in Germany, Austria and Switzerland. Since the 10 March 2007 they gave one more time 6 concerts under the title Zwischenräume – Zweiklang im Einklang together with the Southwest German Radio Symphony Orchestra.

On 31 August 2007 they released the compilation Söhne, Mond und Sterne, which contains songs of the band members. With this selection they wanted to show the diversity of their style directions. But the album could only reach the Austrian charts.

One year later, also in August they released their first number-one-hit Das hat die Welt noch nicht gesehen.

The studio album Iz On appeared on 10 July 2009. It was planned for 2008, but they shifted it to 2009 to release a recording for MTV Unplugged, which was released in September as Dubble-CD and in October as Dubble-DVD.

The fourth studio album was released on 13 May 2011 Barrikaden von Eden. iTunes classified it in the Pop genre but it also has techno-songs and ballads.

On 15 July 2011 appeared Freiheit. The song was dedicated to the Amnesty International. Amnesty International made a video with them, because they had existed fifty years.

In February 2013, they participated on the predetermining for the Eurovision Song Contest for Germans, but lost to Cascada.

On 20 April 2018, it was announced that their founding member and bassist Robbee Mariano had died.

== Discography ==
=== Albums ===
==== Studio albums ====
List of albums, with selected chart positions and certifications
Title	Album details	Peak chart positions			Certifications
Title	Album details	GER	AUT	SWI	Certifications
Zion	18 December 2000; Label: Söhne Mann; Format: CD, digital download	4	3	13	BVMI GER: Platinum; IFPI AUT: Gold; IFPI SWI: Gold
Noiz	Released: 14 June 2004; Label: Söhne Mann; Format: CD, digital download	1	1	4	BVMI GER: 3× Platinum; IFPI AUT: 2× Platinum; IFPI SWI: Platinum
Iz On	Released: 10 July 2009; Label: Söhne Mannheims; Format: CD, digital download	3	4	4	BVMI GER: Gold; IFPI AUT: 2× Platinum; IFPI SWI: Platinum
Barrikaden von Eden	Released: 13 May 2011; Label: Söhne Mannheims Gmbh; Format: CD, digital download	2	2	2	BVMI GER: Gold
ElyZion	Released: 21 January 2014; Label: Söhne Mannheims Gmbh; Format: CD, digital download	9	4	9	
MannHeim	Released: 21 April 2017; Label: Söhne Mannheims Gmbh; Format: CD, digital download	6	8	10	

==== Concert albums ====
List of albums, with selected chart positions and certifications
Title	Album details	Peak chart positions			Certifications
Title	Album details	GER	AUT	SWI	Certifications
Power of the Sound	Released: 8 August 2005; Label: Söhne Mannheims; Format: CD, digital download	1	1	5	BVMI GER: Gold; IFPI AUT: Gold
Wettsingen in Schwetzingen MTV Unplugged	Released: 19 September 2008; Label: XN-Tertainment; Format: CD, digital download	1	2	1	BVMI GER: Platinum; IFPI AUT: Gold; IFPI SWI: Gold

==== Compilations ====
List of albums, with selected chart positions and certifications
Title	Album details	Peak chart positions		
Title	Album details	GER	AUT	SWI
Söhne, Mond & Sterne	Released: 31 August 2007; Label: Söhne Mann; Format: CD, digital download	—	1	—
Evoluzion – Best of	Released: 27 March 2015; Label: Söhne Mannheims GmbH; Format: CD, digital download	7	18	20

=== Singles ===
List of singles, with selected chart positions, certifications and albums
Title	Year	Peak chart positions			Certifications	Album
Title	Year	GER	AUT	SWI	Certifications	Album
"Wir haben euch noch nichts getan"	2000	—	—	—		Zion
"Geh' davon aus"	2000	2	11	8		Zion
"Dein Glück liegt mir am Herzen"	2001	55	—	—		Zion
"The Power of the Sound"	2001	98	—	—		Zion
"Mein Name ist Mensch"	2003	50	—	—		Familienalbum
"Vielleicht"	2004	9	5	23		Noiz
"Dein Leben / Babylon System"	2004	42	41	58		Noiz
"Und wenn ein Lied"	2004	2	2	3	BVMI GER: Gold; IFPI AUT: Gold	Noiz
"Wenn du schläfst"	2005	21	27	29		Noiz
"Das hat die Welt noch nicht gesehen"	2008	1	4	3		MTV Unplugged – Wettsingen in Schwetzingen
"Iz On"	2009	15	56	67		Iz On
"Ich wollt nur deine Stimme hör'n"	2009	13	37	96		Iz On
"Wenn du mich hören könntest"	2009	—	—	—		Iz On
"Ist es wahr (Aim High)"	2011	27	64	—		Barrikaden von Eden
"Freiheit"	2011	77	—	70		Barrikaden von Eden
"Für dich"	2011	98	—	—		Barrikaden von Eden
"Gesucht & Gefunden"	2012	51	44	57		non-album single
"One Love"	2013	56	—	—		non-album single
"Großstadt"	2014	—	—	—		ElyZion
"Augenblick"	2014	—	—	—		ElyZion
"Wir leisten es gern"	2014	—	—	—		ElyZion
"Back to You"	2014	—	—	—		ElyZion
"Was ist geblieben"	2015	—	—	—		Evoluzion – 20 Jahre
"Rosenblätter"	2015	—	—	—		Evoluzion – 20 Jahre
"Sunshine"	2015	—	—	—		non-album single
"Guten Morgen"	2017	—	—	—		MannHeim
"Wir leben im Jetzt"	2017	—	—	—		MannHeim

List of other charted songs, with selected chart positions, showing year released and album name
Title	Year	Peak chart positions		Album
Title	Year	GER	SWI	Album
"Zurück zu dir"	2004	—	75	Noiz
"Marionetten"	2017	56	—	MannHeim

=== DVDs ===
List of albums, with selected chart positions and certifications
Title	DVD details	Peak chart positions			Certifications
Title	DVD details	GER	AUT	SWI	Certifications
Power of the Sound (live)	Released: 8. August 2005; Label: Söhne Mann; Format: CD, digital download	*	1	*	BVMI GER: Gold
Wettsingen in Schwetzingen MTV Unplugged	Released: 21. November 2008; Label: Söhne Mann; Format: CD, digital download	*	1	2	BVMI GER: Gold
"*" Sales were count to the album.

== Awards ==
- ECHO - "Best National Group" (2005)
