= Zwischenspiel – Alles für den Herrn =

Studio album by Xavier Naidoo
- Released: 25 March 2002
- Genre: Pop; soul; R&B
- Label: Naidoo
- Producer

Xavier Naidoo chronology
Live (1999)	Zwischenspiel – Alles für den Herrn (2002)	Alles Gute vor uns (2003)

Zwischenspiel – Alles für den Herrn (lit. "Interlude – Everything for the Lord") is the second studio album by German singer Xavier Naidoo, released on his Naidoo Records label on 25 March 2002 in German-speaking Europe. In 2016, it was awarded a double platinum certification from the Independent Music Companies Association, which indicated sales of at least 800,000 copies+ throughout Europe.

== Track listing ==
Zwischenspiel – Disc 1
No.	Title	Writer(s)	Length
1.	"Wo willst du hin?"	Naidoo; Michael Herberger	4:15
2.	"Auf Herz und Nieren"	Naidoo; Herberger	4:22
3.	"Wir gehören zusammen"	Naidoo; van Eecke	4:11
4.	"Abschied nehmen"	Naidoo; Herberger	7:01
5.	"Kein Königreich"	Naidoo; Herberger	3:39
6.	"Wir haben alles Gute vor uns"	Naidoo; Herberger	5:33
7.	"Alle Männer müssen kämpfen"	Naidoo; Neil Palmer	5:29
8.	"That's The Way Love Is"	Byron Burke; Herb Lawson; Byron Stingily	4:38
9.	"Brief"	Naidoo; Herberger	5:14
10.	"Don't Give Up"	Peter Gabriel	6:28
11.	"Gut aufgepasst"	Xavier; W.T. David	4:20
12.	"Wenn ich schon Kinder hätte" (with Curse)	Naidoo; Herberger; Michael Kurth	4:49
13.	"Kleines Lied (Kinderlied)"	Naidoo; Herberger	3:31
14.	"Die Dinge singen hör ich so gern"	Schönherz; Fleer; Rilke	3:50
15.	"Keep Your Eyes On Me"	Naidoo	5:00

Alles für den Herrn – Disc 2
No.	Title	Writer(s)	Length
1.	"Himmel über Deutschland"	Naidoo; Herberger	6:15
2.	"Ich lass sie sterben"	Naidoo; Herberger	3:46
3.	"Bevor du gehst"	Naidoo; Herberger	5:15
4.	"I'd Be Waiting"	Naidoo; Herberger; Metaphysics	4:04
5.	"Sie ist im Viereck angelegt"	Naidoo; Herberger; Metaphysics	3:59
6.	"Eyes R Shut"	Naidoo; Philippe van Eecke	5:35
7.	"Der Geist ist willig"	Naidoo; Jim Sengendo; W.T. Davis	4:24
8.	"Mägde und Knechte"	Naidoo; Davis	4:37
9.	"Der Herr knickt alle Bäume"	Naidoo; Davis; Marlon James	3:52
10.	"Wer weiss schon was der Morgen bringt"	Naidoo; Davis	3:43
11.	"Alles für den Herrn"	Naidoo; Davis; Uwe "Banton" Schäfer	3:54
12.	"Wo driften wir hin"	Naidoo; Davis	4:10
13.	"Klagelieder"	Naidoo; Davis	3:53
14.	"Lied (Du nur, Du)" (with Ben Becker)	Schönherz; Fleer; Lucas; Dehnhardt; Mende; Rainer Maria Rilke	4:20
15.	"Wenn du es willst (Mir sind die Hände gebunden)"	Naidoo; Herberger	6:29

== Charts ==
=== Weekly charts ===
Chart (2002)	Peak position
Austrian Albums (Ö3 Austria)	1
German Albums (Offizielle Top 100)	1
Swiss Albums (Schweizer Hitparade)	3

=== Year-end charts ===
Chart (2002)	Rank
Austrian Albums (Ö3 Austria)	10
German Albums (Official Top 100)	4
Swiss Albums (Schweizer Hitparade)	32

== Certifications and sales ==
Region	Certification	Certified units/sales
Austria (IFPI Austria)	Gold	15,000^{*}
Germany (BVMI)	2× Platinum	600,000^{^}
Switzerland (IFPI Switzerland)	2× Platinum	80,000^{^}
^{*} Sales figures based on certification alone.^{^} Shipments figures based on certification alone.

== Release history ==
Region	Date	Format	Label
Austria	25 March 2002	Digital download, CD	Naidoo Records
Germany	25 March 2002	Digital download, CD	Naidoo Records
Switzerland	25 March 2002	Digital download, CD	Naidoo Records
