= Telegramm für X =

Studio album by Xavier Naidoo
- Released: 24 November 2005
- Genre: Pop; soul; R&B
- Length: 72:40
- Label: Naidoo Records

Xavier Naidoo chronology
Zwischenspiel – Alles für den Herrn (2002)	Telegramm für X (2005)	Alles kann besser werden (2009)

Telegramm für X ("Telegram for X") is the fifth studio album by German singer Xavier Naidoo, released by Naidoo Records on 24 November 2005 in German-speaking Europe. In 2016 it was awarded a double platinum certification from the Independent Music Companies Association, which indicated sales of at least 800,000 copies+ throughout Europe.

== Track listing ==
1. Und – 4:20
2. Bitte frag' mich nicht – 5:07
3. Dieser Weg – 4:04
4. Zeilen aus Gold – 5:31
5. Oh My Lady – 5:40
6. Seelenheil – 4:31
7. Wo komm ich her – 4:57
8. Bist du am Leben interessiert – 5:56
9. Abgrund – 4:58
10. Bist du aufgewacht – 4:08
11. Sie sind nicht dafür – 4:27
12. In DEINE Hände – 6:10
13. Du bist wie ein Segen – 4:27
14. Was wir alleine nicht schaffen – 3:44
15. Danke – 7:20

== Charts ==
=== Weekly charts ===
Chart (2005)	Peak position
Austrian Albums (Ö3 Austria)	1
German Albums (Offizielle Top 100)	1
Swiss Albums (Schweizer Hitparade)	1

=== Year-end charts ===
Chart (2005)	Rank
Austrian Albums (Ö3 Austria)	27
German Albums (Official Top 100)	89
Swiss Albums (Schweizer Hitparade)	77
Chart (2006)	Rank
Austrian Albums (Ö3 Austria)	4
German Albums (Official Top 100)	3
Swiss Albums (Schweizer Hitparade)	5
Chart (2007)	Rank
German Albums (Official Top 100)	44

== Certifications and sales ==
Region	Certification	Certified units/sales
Germany (BVMI)	4× Platinum	800,000^{^}
Switzerland (IFPI Switzerland)	3× Gold	60,000^{^}
^{^} Shipments figures based on certification alone.

== Release history ==
Region	Date	Format	Label
Austria	24 November 2005	Digital download, CD	Naidoo Records
Germany	24 November 2005	Digital download, CD	Naidoo Records
Switzerland	24 November 2005	Digital download, CD	Naidoo Records
