= Cora E. =

German nurse and hip-hop artist

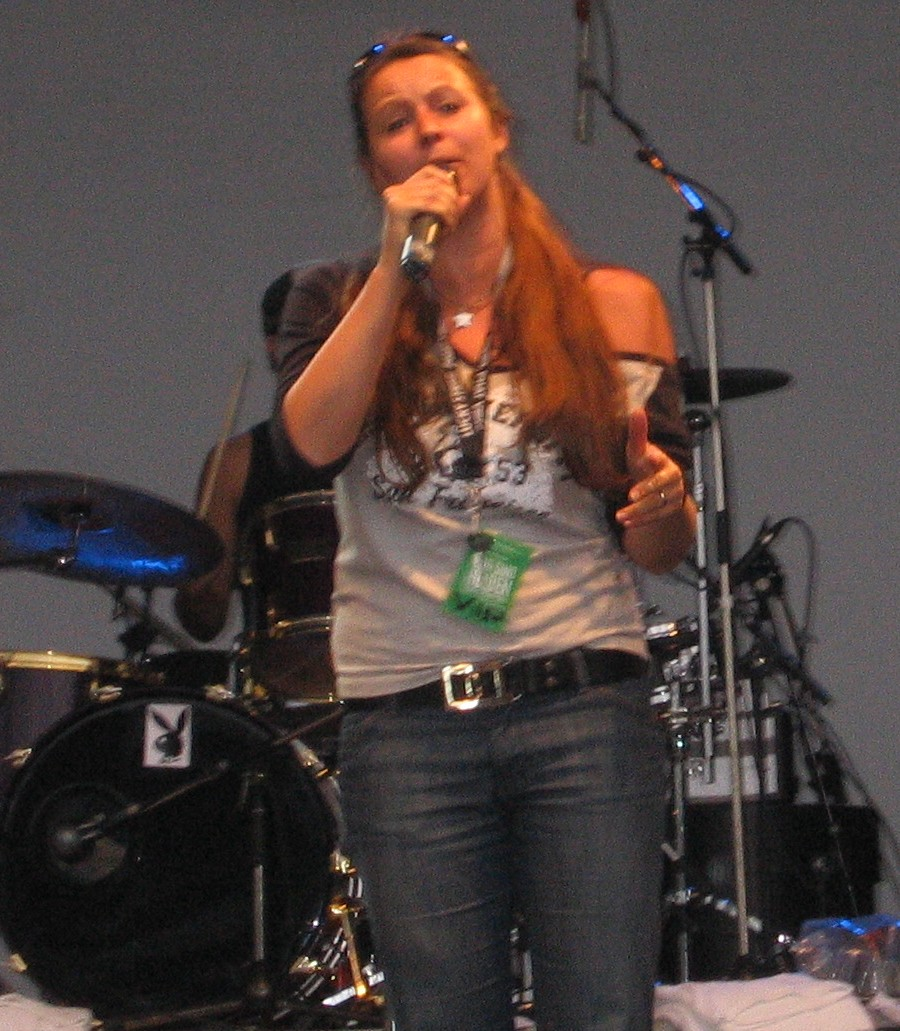
Cora E.

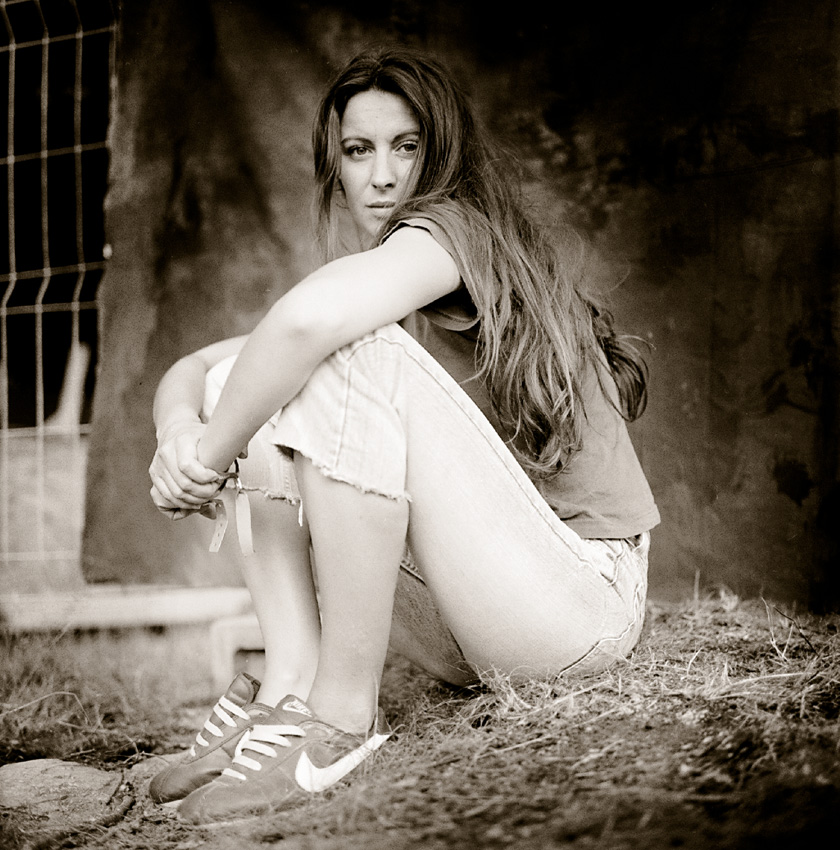
Cora E. (2000)

Cora E. (born Sylvia Macco; 1968 in Kiel, West Germany) is a former nurse turned hip-hop artist who emerged in the early underground German hip hop culture. At the time that she came to prominence, she was not only one of the originators, but she was also one of the few females in the industry. She was one of the very few old-school acts to be taken on by a major record label after she released two singles with Buback record company. She wrote her own lyrics, and worked independently. Many pegged her as a rapper but she called herself a "hip hopper." Despite this, she and another traditionalist group Advanced Chemistry insisted that rap and hip-hop are inseparable. The social criticisms based on personal experience in her music link her to other hip-hop artists in Germany, such as Advanced Chemistry. Her old school sound interested EMI. She had success with the record company and her first single Schlüsselkind (Latchkey Kid) was a hit.

Her first single with EMI, "Schlüsselkind" (Latchkey Kid), was released in December 1996 and was able to achieve wide airplay. The song featured a relatively unpolished production style and traditional delivery, with lyrics that attempted at social criticism via her personal experience by linking a description of her own childhood to the problems of children of working parents. Cora E. was the only female rap star who wrote all of her own lyrics. The song was a tribute to the transformative power of hip-hop and directly refers to its country of origin, the United States:

I almost drowned but was lucky the wave from the United States threw me back onto land/

Started to live, became active, and dreamed for the first time without being asleep/ There was something waiting for me and I went for it/ Something that I could get and I stayed on it and that's how it began that I was able to achieve something/

I wanted to rap like Shante.

— Cora E. (English Translation)
