= Xavier Naidoo =

German singer (born 1971)

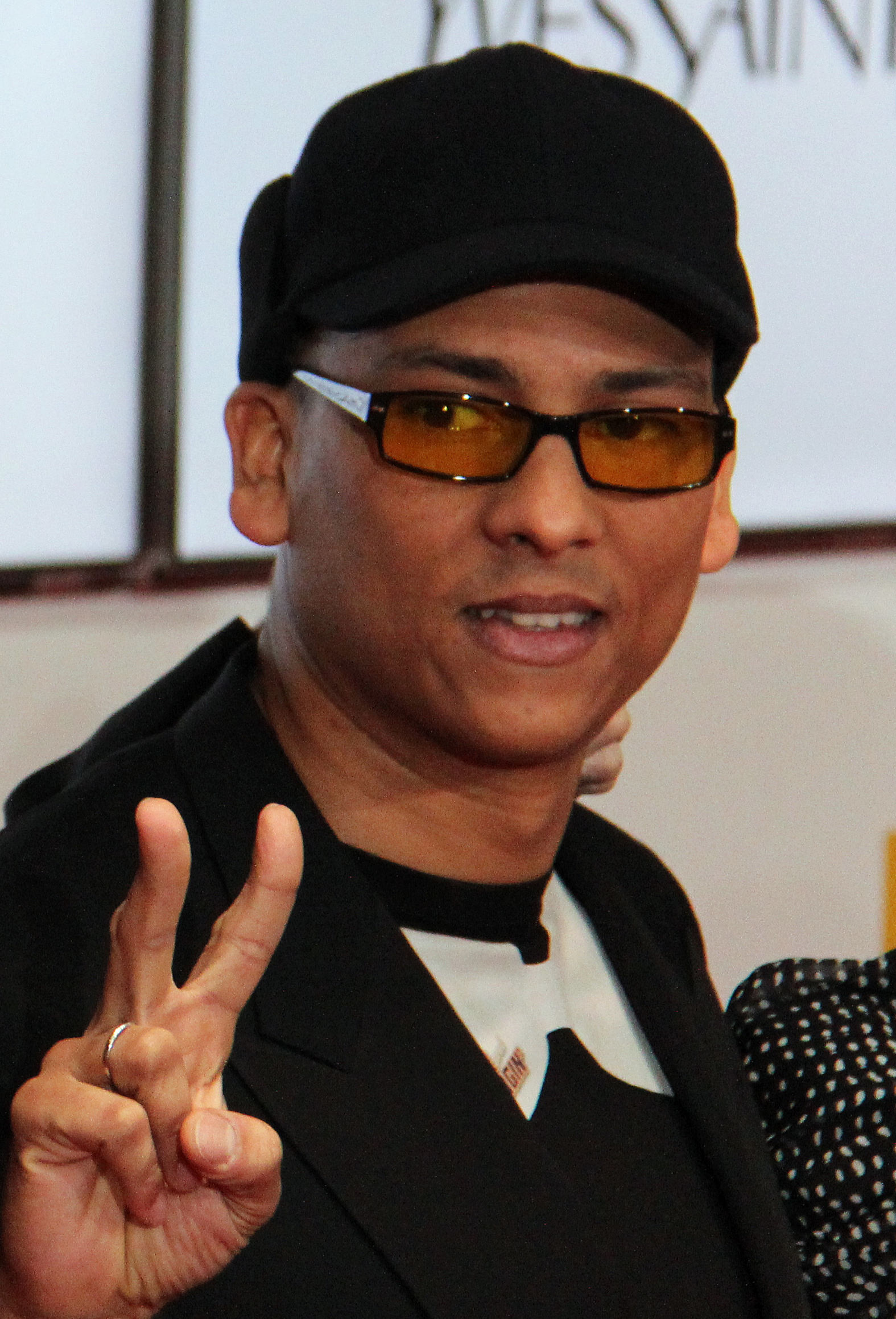
- Naidoo in 2012

Background information
- Born: Xavier Kurt Naidoo; 2 October 1971 (age 55); Mannheim, Baden-Württemberg, West Germany
- Genres: Soul, R&B, pop
- Occupations: Singer, songwriter, record producer
- Years active: 1993–present
- Labels: 3P Records, Naidoo Records
- Website: xaviernaidoo.de

Xavier Kurt Naidoo (German: [ˈkseːviɐ naɪˈduː]; born 2 October 1971) is a German soul and R&B singer, songwriter and record producer. He is a founding member of German band Söhne Mannheims, and started two record labels, Beats Around the Bush and Naidoo Records. Naidoo also has a successful solo career. His debut album Nicht von dieser Welt (1998) has sold over 1 million records, and all his next six albums Zwischenspiel – Alles für den Herrn (2002), Telegramm für X (2005), Alles kann besser werden (2009), Danke für's Zuhören (2012), Bei meiner Seele (2013) und Nicht von dieser Welt 2 (2016) reached number 1 on the German album charts. Most of his songs are in German, but he has also released a few English songs.

He has been the subject of multiple controversies due to the content of his songs, political statements, adherence to conspiracy theories, propagation of far-right talking points as well as his use of homophobic, antisemitic, and racist tropes. Naidoo is also a climate change denier.

== Early life ==
Naidoo was born and raised in Mannheim, to Catholic South African parents. His mother, a seamstress, was of Irish and Egyptian descent while his father, a welder, was of Indian Telugu and German ancestry. Naidoo grew up in Mannheim's Wallstadt borough and as a child, he was a choirboy.

== Career ==
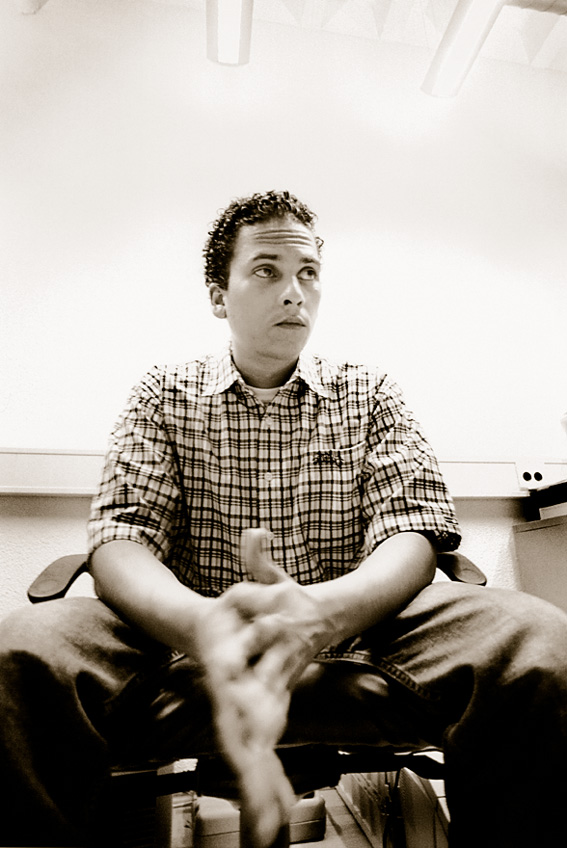
Naidoo in 2002

While in school, Naidoo joined Celebration Gospel Choir, a gospel music group, and Just 4 Music, a regional band. After graduating Realschule and training as a cook, he worked as a bouncer and swimsuit model. After relocating to the United States, Naidoo released his first full-length English-language album Seeing Is Believing under his stage name Kobra in 1994. Between 1995 and 1998, he also acted in several musicals. He currently resides in Heidelberg in his native Germany.

After working as a backing vocalist for the Rödelheim Hartreim Projekt and 3P label mates Sabrina Setlur and Illmat!c, Naidoo released his first German-language album Nicht von dieser Welt in 1998, for which he won an ECHO Award and an MTV Europe Music Award. Selling more than one million copies in total, it produced six singles, including "Seine Straßen" and "Sie sieht mich nicht", the latter of which served as the theme song for Astérix & Obélix Take on Caesar (1999). After his highly publicized departure from 3P, his third studio album Zwischenspiel – Alles für den Herrn was released in 2002. It spawned the top five hit singles "Wo willst du hin?" and "Abschied nehmen" and led to a collaboration with Wu-Tang Clan member and producer RZA, with whom he released his first number-one single "Ich kenne nichts (das so schön ist wie du)" in 2003.

Known for his soulful voice and his Christian lyrics, he has collaborated with several famous artists such as Deborah Cox and Swiss artist Stress. Naidoo was with Söhne Mannheims (Sons of Mannheim) earlier before he became famous, after his popularity increased he went back to the band and wanted to help them to become famous too, which worked. Nowadays he switches back and forth with doing some solo music or recording an album and going on tour with Söhne Mannheims. He joined groups like Brothers Keepers and the charity project (Signs of the Times) in early 2013

In 2012, he also collaborated in Xavas, a duo formation with Kool Savas, a Turkish-German rapper in the album Gespaltene Persönlichkeit. The two had already worked together on a number of other releases.

In 2013, Xavier released "Eye Opener" on the vocal collaboration album "Features" by Kris Menace.

== Eurovision Song Contest invitation and withdrawal ==
On 19 November 2015, Naidoo was announced as the German representative in the Eurovision Song Contest 2016. His entry was due to be chosen from six competing entries in a national final in February.

However, his selection proved controversial. Naidoo's right-wing political views, coupled with homophobic lyrics in his 2012 song (featuring Kool Savas) "Wo sind sie jetzt", led to calls for his selection to be reconsidered. Within a day, an online petition had gathered nearly 15,000 signatories. Claudia Roth, a vice-president of the Bundestag for the German Green Party, also criticised the decision, citing the poor timing, with right-wing political causes gaining popularity in the wake of the migrant crisis. On 21 November, German broadcaster NDR revealed that Germany had withdrawn the singer's participation.

== Political views ==
Xavier Naidoo has spoken at a meeting of the Reichsbürgerbewegung, denies the legal existence of the Federal Republic of Germany and claims Germany is a country occupied by enemy, foreign forces. During the event he also denied the official account of the September 11 attacks, stating that "simply put, whoever believes what was reported about this event is not seeing clearly". Naidoo has blamed the Rothschild family for Germany's 20th-century history.

Naidoo gave similar opinions in a live interview on ARD-Morgenmagazin, public service breakfast television in 2015.

In March 2020, two video clips of Naidoo were released on social media, showing him singing one of his songs in the aftermath of the anti-migrant 2018 Chemnitz protests with altered lyrics. In these he stated about the migrants who recently arrived in Germany: "Your daughters, your children shall suffer; Shall have to undress next to wolves in the gym; While you stand around placidly doing nothing" and "Far and wide, not a man in sight, who can save this country yet". Naidoo was subsequently fired by the TV-station RTL where he worked as a judge on the casting show Deutschland sucht den Superstar.

Naidoo also propagates climate change denial. He regarded the Fridays for Future movement as orchestrated by the Antichrist. According to Naidoo the proof is to be found in the name of the movement, which abbreviates to "FFF", the letter "F" being the sixth in the alphabet, therefore symbolizing the number of the beast.

Naidoo also denies the existence of the COVID-19 pandemic and is a strong opponent of the obligation to wear facemasks in certain public places that was introduced by the German government. He voiced these opinions in a video he published via Telegram in July 2020. In this same video, Naidoo announced his intention to sue the German government over its alleged faking of the pandemic.

On 21 April 2022, in a video posted to his social media accounts, Naidoo distanced himself from radical and antisemitic views and apologised for previous utterances. He said that the war Russia is waging against Ukraine has opened his eyes, since his wife is originally Ukrainian, and he had to take in refugees from her family. This led him to question his former sources of information.

== Musical themes ==
=== Ethos ===
Naidoo's music has been claimed to feature a utopian, pan-theistic ideology through which he expressed his own political anxieties and stances. Although he explores Christian, Muslim, and Rastafarian modes of living, his work has been asserted to be strongly grounded in Old Testament narratives and apocalyptic sentiments. Applying these to situations faced specifically in a "black German" context, Naidoo has called for solutions not from the state, but from cross-cultural spiritual collectives. For example, in the lyrics and video for "Seine Straßen", the power of the state in terms of protection and surveillance is said to pale in comparison to higher spiritual powers.

His lyrics have also featured antisemitic slurs and homophobic sentiments. His 2012 song "Wo sind" implied that homosexuals were pedophiles.

=== Mixed German and Asian identity ===
Although Naidoo does not engage directly with his own mixed German and Asian identity in his music, he was integral to the formation of an Afro-German presence in German popular culture. Specifically, his work with Glashaus can be said to have originated a distinctly Afro-German form of R&B, one which addressed the issues faced by black Germans without invoking black Germans specifically. Not only did Naidoo experiment with sounds from around the black diaspora, notably working with RZA, but was also a member of Brothers Keepers, an explicitly Afro-German and explicitly political collective. As lead singer on "Adriano", one of Brothers Keepers' most well-known songs, he has been seen to stand with the Afro-German collective and setting the tone for their message.

== Discography ==
=== Studio albums ===
- Seeing Is Believing (1993)
- Nicht von dieser Welt (1998)
- Zwischenspiel – Alles für den Herrn (2002)
- Telegramm für X (2005)
- Alles kann besser werden (2009)
- Mordsmusik (2013) (as Der Xer)
- Bei meiner Seele (2013)
- Tanzmusik (Xavier lebt hier nicht mehr) (2014) (as Der Xer)
- Nicht von dieser Welt 2 (2016)
- Für dich. (2017)
- Hin und weg (2019)

=== Live albums ===
- Live (1999)
- Alles Gute vor uns (2003)
- Wettsingen in Schwetzingen - MTV Unplugged (2008)
- Alles kann besser werden - Live in Oberhausen (2010)

== Filmography ==
- Tatort – Die kleine Zeugin (TV, 2000)
- Auf Herz und Nieren (2001)

=== Musical ===
- Human Pacific (1995)
- People (1998)

=== Television ===
- The Voice of Germany (2011–2012, coach) (ProSieben, Sat.1)
- Deutschland sucht den Superstar (2019–March 2020, judge) (RTL)

== Awards ==
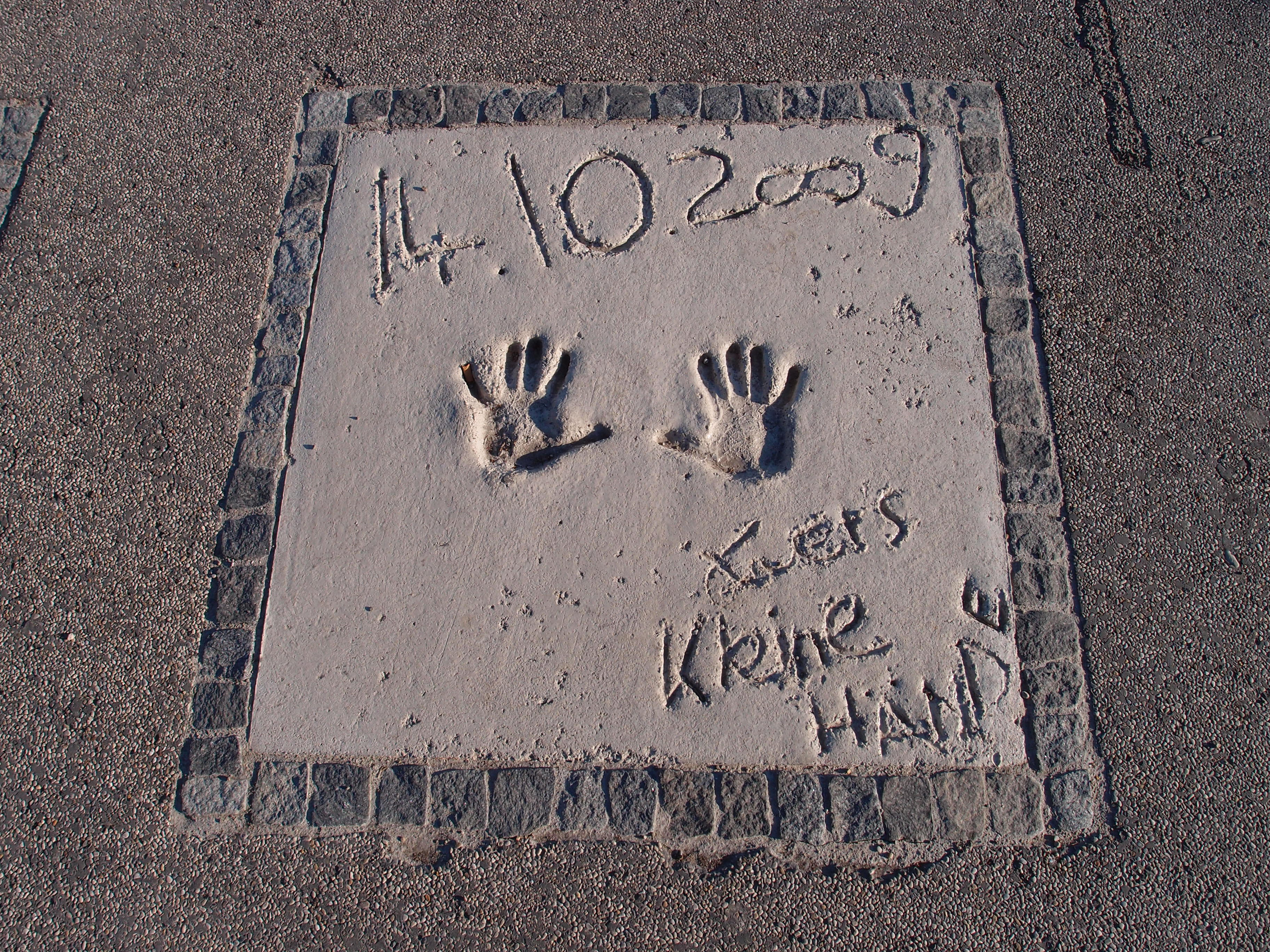
Naidoos handprints at the Munich Olympic Walk of Stars

- 1999: MTV Europe Music Award – "Best German Act"
- 2000: ECHO – "Best National Male Artist – Rock/Pop"
- 2002: Goldene Stimmgabel
- 2002: Comet – "Best Act National"
- 2002: MTV Europe Music Award – "Best German Act"
- 2004: Amadeus Award – "Record of the Year" for "Ich kenne nichts (Das so schön ist wie Du)"
- 2006: Goldene Kamera – "Pop National"
- 2006: ECHO - "Best National Male Artist - Rock/Pop"
- 2014: Das Goldene Brett vorm Kopf ("Golden blockhead") for the "most astonishing pseudo-scientific rubbish"
