= Glashaus =

German pop/soul band

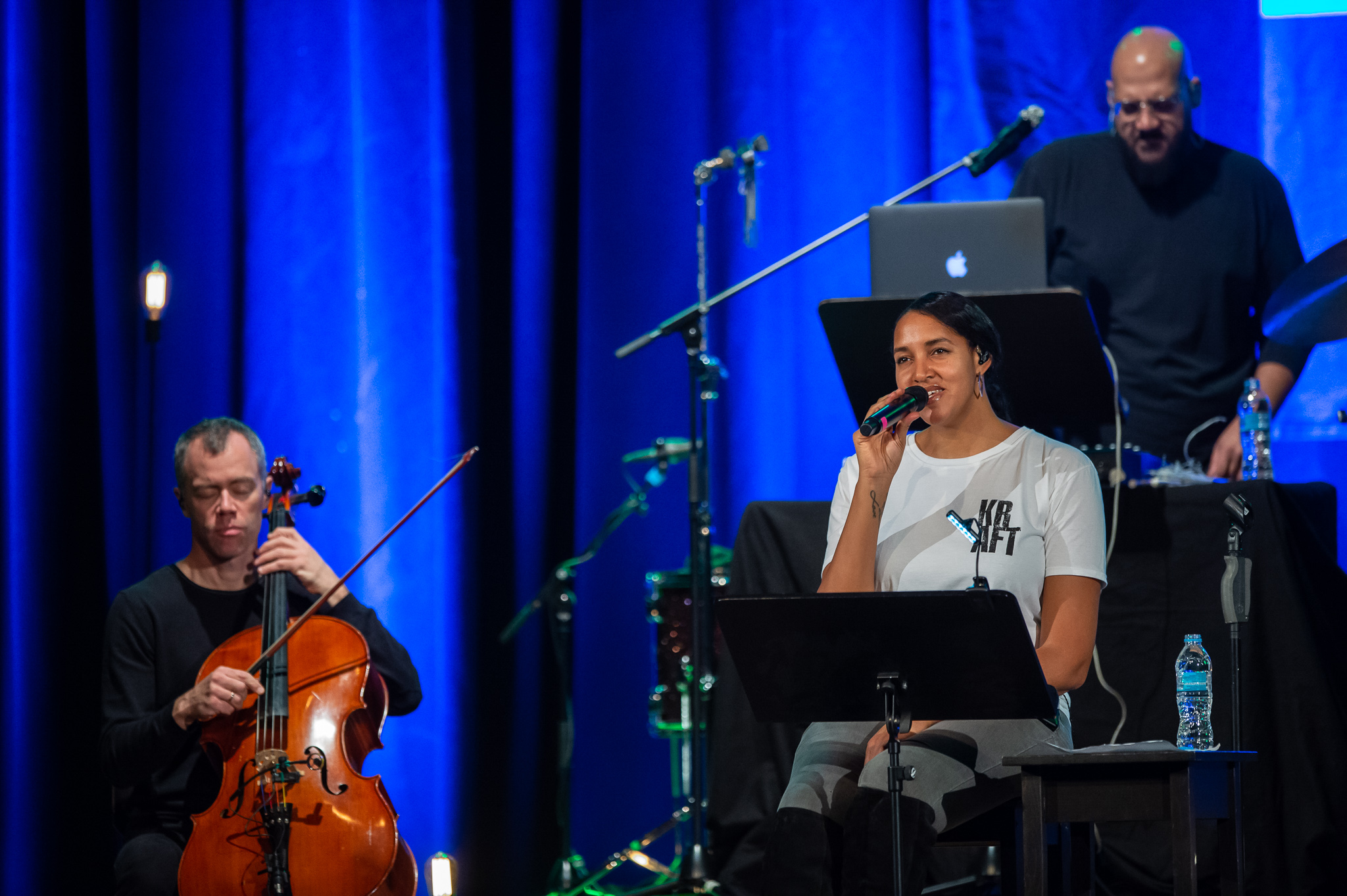
- Glashaus in 2019

Background information
- Origin: Germany
- Genres: Pop-soul; hip hop
- Years active: 2001–present
- Labels: 3p
- Members: Martin Haas; Moses Pelham; Cassandra Steen
- Past members: Peppa Singt (2008–2016)
- Website: imglashaus.de

Glashaus is a German band consisting of lead singer Cassandra Steen, songwriter and rapper Moses Pelham, and producer Martin Haas. The trio is best known for their mixture of R&B, soul and pop music with lyrics in German language.

== History ==
In 2000, while searching for new talented singers, producers and label partners Moses Pelham and Martin Haas were introduced to vocalist Cassandra Steen (by then principally known for her appearances on the latest album by Freundeskreis). Although they soon started working on what was to be Steen's solo album, the project moved into a collaborative endeavor and as a result the trio decided to form a band – later named Glashaus.

After months of recording Glashaus finally released their debut single "Wenn das Liebe ist" in 2001. The song became the band's biggest hit to date when it debuted at No. 21 on the German singles charts, reaching its peak position of No. 5 in its third week. While the following singles, "Was immer es ist", Selig cover "Ohne dich", and "Trost (es tut weh)", failed to chart or sell notably, they helped keeping the band's self-titled debut album in the German media charts for over 30 weeks and got the band nominated for three ECHO Award.

== Discography ==
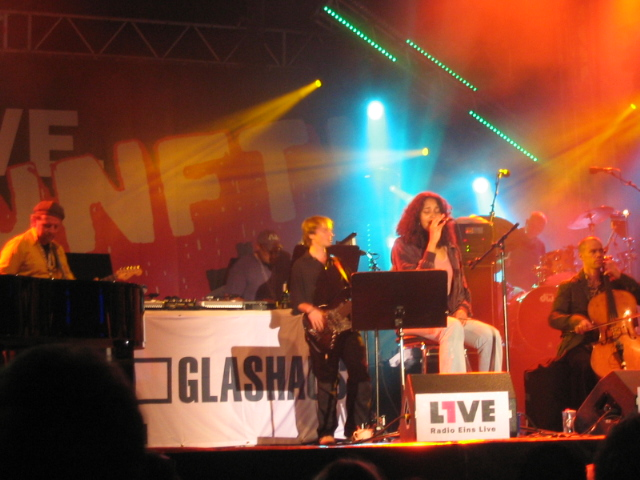
Glashaus in 2005

=== Studio albums ===
Title	Album details	Peak positions		
Title	Album details	GER	AUT	SWI
Glashaus	Released: 2 April 2001; Label: 3p; Formats: CD, digital download	20	—	—
Glashaus II (Jah Sound System)	Released: 19 August 2002; Label: 3p; Formats: CD, digital download	16	53	83
Drei	Released: 9 May 2005; Label: 3p; Formats: CD, digital download	4	—	61
Neu	Released: 6 November 2009; Label: 3p; Formats: CD, digital download	53	—	—
Kraft	Released: 28 April 2017; Label: 3p; Formats: CD, digital download	16	—	—

=== Compilation albums ===
Title	Album details	Peak positions		
Title	Album details	GER	AUT	SWI
Live in Berlin	Released: 25 November 2002; Label: 3p; Formats: CD, digital download	—	—	—
Von Herzen – Das Beste	Released: 10 November 2006; Label: 3p; Formats: CD, digital download	72	—	—

=== Singles ===
Title	Year	Peak positions			Certifications	Album
Title	Year	GER	AUT	SWI	Certifications	Album
"Wenn das Liebe ist"	2001	5	27	18	BVMI: Gold	Glashaus
"Was immer es ist"	2001	48	—	—		Glashaus
"Ohne dich"	2001	43	—	—		non-album single
"Trost (es tut weh)"	2001	99	—	—		Glashaus
"Bald (und wir sind frei)"	2002	77	—	—		Glashaus II (Jah Sound System)
"Land in Sicht"	2002	—	—	—		Glashaus II (Jah Sound System)
"Ich bring' dich durch die Nacht"	2002	—	—	—		Glashaus II (Jah Sound System)
"Haltet die Welt an"	2005	11	—	—		Drei
"Du"	2005	47	—	—		Drei
"Is' nur Kino"	2005	60	—	—		Drei
"In meinem Leben"	2006	96	—	—		Von Herzen – Das Beste
"Das hier"	2009	43	—	—		Neu
"Licht"	2010	52	—	—		Neu
"Fühlt sich wie sterben an"	2016	—	—	—		Kraft
"Kraft"	2017	—	—	—		Kraft
"Gegen den Strom"	2017	—	—	—		Kraft
