= Moses Pelham =

German rapper (b. 1971)

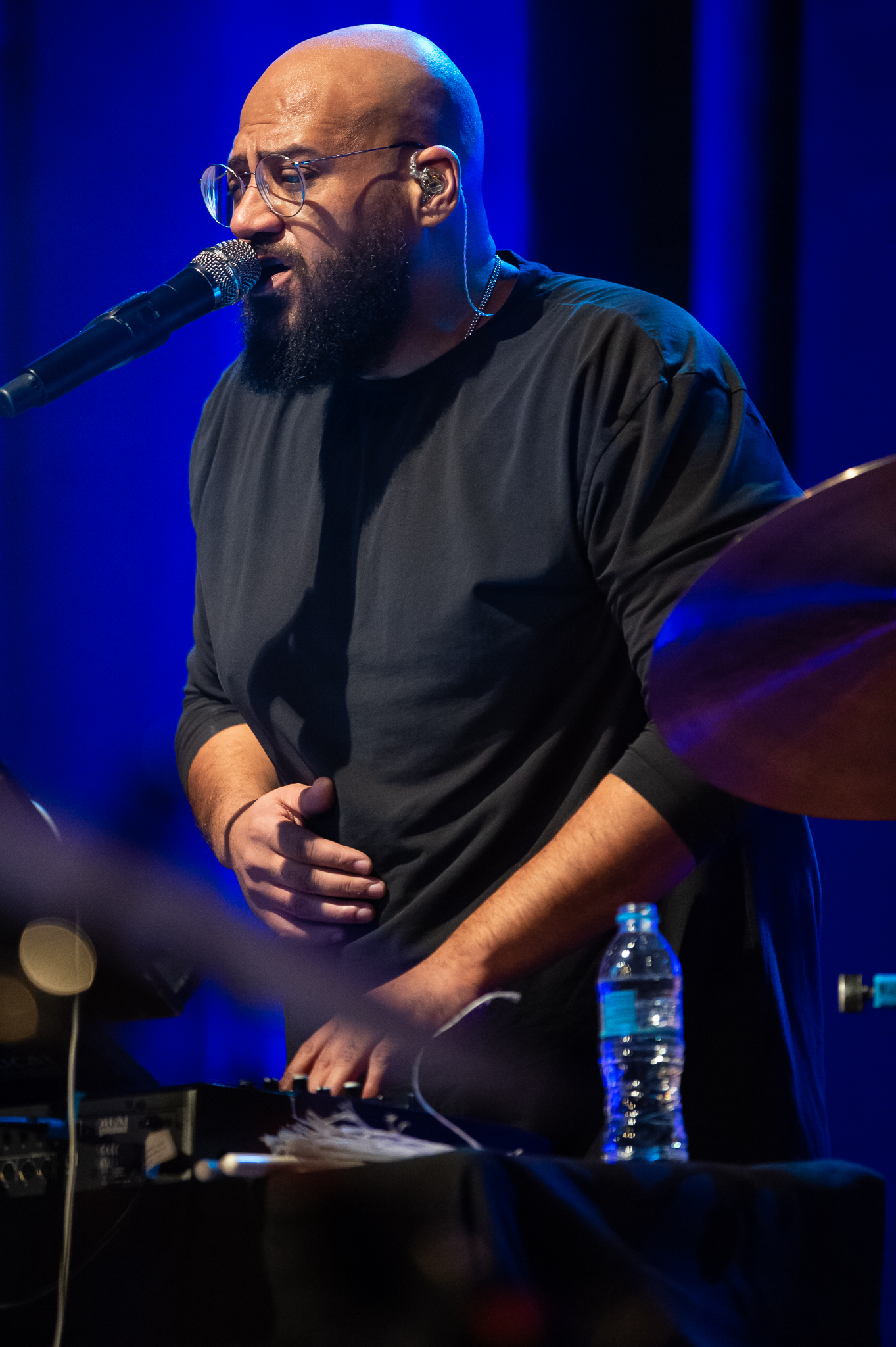
Pelham in 2019

Moses Pelham (born 24 February 1971 in Frankfurt) is a German rapper, singer and producer.

In 1993, together with Thomas Hofmann in Frankfurt, he started the Rödelheim Hartreim Projekt. Pelham is a member of the German band Glashaus.

== Works ==
=== Albums ===
- 1989: Raining Rhymes
- 1992: The Bastard Lookin' 4 the Light (1992 produced, but first published in 2000)
- 1994: Rödelheim Hartreim Projekt – Direkt aus Rödelheim (with Thomas Hofmann)
- 1995: Rödelheim Hartreim Projekt – Live aus Rödelheim (with Thomas Hofmann)
- 1996: Rödelheim Hartreim Projekt – Zurück nach Rödelheim (with Thomas Hofmann)
- 1998: Geteiltes Leid I
- 2004: Geteiltes Leid II
- 2012: Geteiltes Leid III
- 2017: Herz
- 2020: Emuna
- 2021: Nostalgie Tape

=== Singles ===
- 1988: Ay-Ay-Ay (What We Do for Love) (with Rico Sparx)
- 1988: Twilight Zone
- 1989: Can This Be Love
- 1989: Raining Rhymes
- 1990: Muscles (with Harold Faltermeyer)
- 1998: Hartreim Saga
- 1998: Schnaps für alle
- 1999: Skillz (with Illmat!c & Xavier Naidoo)
- 1999: Mein Glück
- 2000: Bonnie & Clyde 2000 (with Cora E.)
- 2004: Ein schöner Tag
- 2004: 77 Minutes of Strugglin (with Illmat!c & Kool Savas)
- 2006: Gott liebt mich
- 2009: Strugglin' (2009 ISAS Remix) (with Illmat!c, Kool Savas & Cassandra Steen)
- 2012: Für die Ewigkeit
- 2019: Notaufnahme
- 2020: Weiße Fahne
- 2020: Wunder (with Faiz Mangat)
- 2020: Juli
- 2020: Emuna (acoustic) (with Stefanie Kloß)
- 2020: Backstein
- 2020: Du
- 2021: Lappen wie Du

== Lawsuit with Kraftwerk ==
Pelham used for his 1997 song "Nur mir" a two-second sample of Kraftwerk's "Metall auf Metall" from 1977. As a result, Kraftwerk sued Pelham for copyright infringement. The case continued for over 20 years, with Pelham ultimately losing in 2020. However, as copyright law changed shortly afterwards, the ruling doesn't apply to the current law, and the lawsuits for the use of the sample after June 2021 continue.
