= Lenka Pichlíková-Burke =

Czech-American actress (born 1954)

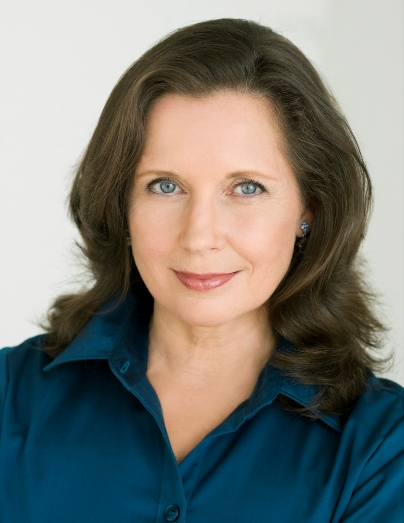
- Lenka Pichlíková-Burke
- Born: July 28, 1954 (age 71); Prague, Czechoslovakia
- Occupations: Actress, mime artist, university professor, translator
- Spouse: Marcus B. Burke
- Children: M. K. Francis Burke, Nicholas A. B. Burke (sons)
- Parent(s): Karel Pichlík (father), Anna Hodková, born Málková (mother)

Lenka Pichlíková – Burke (born July 28, 1954) is a Czech-American actress. She is the seventh generation of her family to appear onstage since the 18th century, her great-uncle was the noted national actor, Ladislav Pešek. While in Czechoslovakia, she performed on stage in many theatres, played in twelve films, and created over 40 television roles, rising to the rank of Advanced Master Artist. In addition to performing as a speaking actress, she was also involved professionally in classic pantomime. Since the 1980s she has resided in the United States. In the United States, she has performed onstage in speaking roles as well as in pantomime productions for more than 25 years. Since 1988, she has been a member of the Actors' Equity Association, the union which represents professional actors. In 2006 she was named the "Best Mime" of Fairfield County, Connecticut. She teaches performing arts, dramatic literature, and cultural history, and translates plays.

== Biography and work ==
=== Czechoslovak period ===
In 1977, Lenka Pichlíková finished her studies at the Faculty of Theatre of the Academy of Performing Arts in Prague. She was a member of the Jiří Wolker Theatre company in Prague, where she had originally performed at the age of nine. She subsequently worked in the companies of the Theatre on the Balustrade, The Drama Club, and The Vinohrady Theatre in Prague, and performed as a guest artist in the National Theatre in Prague. Among her roles during this period was Petrunjela in Uncle Maroje by Marin Držić, and two roles in Insect Play by Karel and Josef Čapek (DISK Theatre – Faculty of Theatre), further Bianca in Shakespeare's The Taming of the Shrew (Jiří Wolker Theatre), Anna in Vladislav Vančura's Peevish Summer (The Vinohrady Theatre), Anička in Josef Tajovský's Women's Law (The Drama Club). In addition to acting onstage, she was a member of Ladislav Fialka's mime company at the Theatre on the Balustrade. She performed in a joint mime-acting production, Broom in Confusion, based on works by Molière (Milan Lukeš, Evald Schorm, and Ladislav Fialka, 1981).

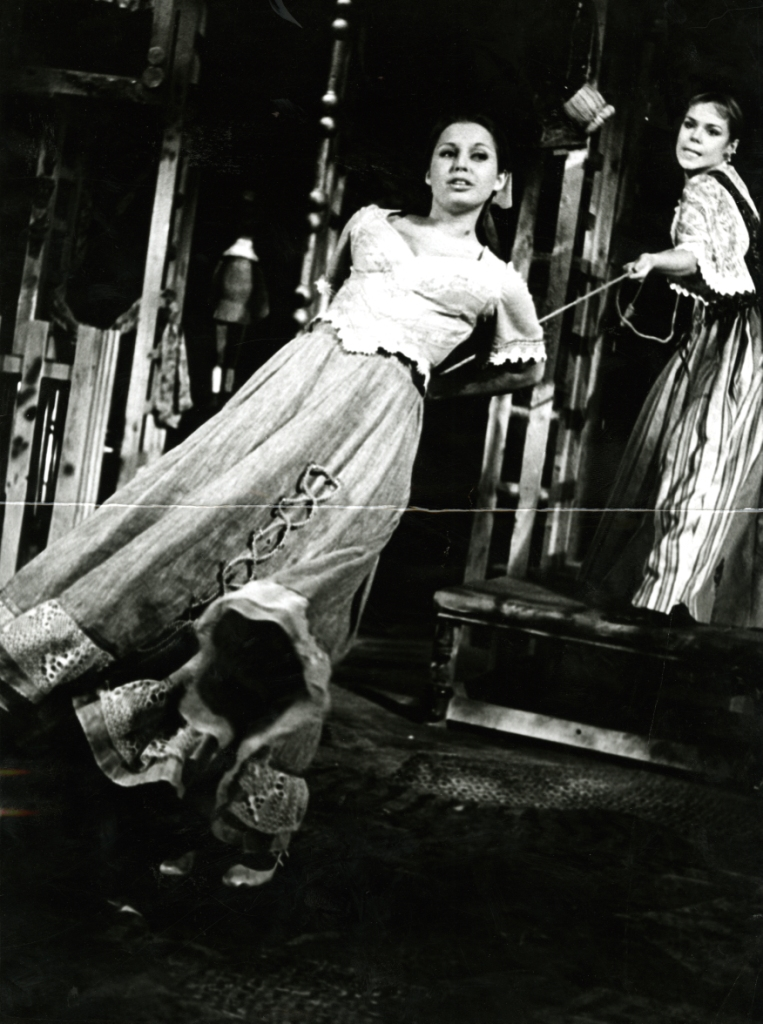
Lenka Pichlíková as Bianca and Dagmar Veškrnová as Katherina in The Taming of the Shrew (Jiří Wolker Theatre, 1978).

During her career in Czechoslovakia, Lenka Pichlíková created over 40 television roles and performed in 12 Czech and European co-production feature films. The most successful of these was The Trumpet's Song, directed by Ludvík Ráža, in which she played the main role. The film, originally produced for Czechoslovak Television, won first prize (The Golden Nymph award) at the Festival de Télévision de Monte-Carlo in 1981. She also played in films by Karel Kachyňa (Meeting in July, Counting Sheep, Time for a Check-up, Otakar Vávra (Dark Sun), Viktor Polesný (Birthday – a film that was suppressed by communist officials), and in Jiří Krejčík's and Evald Schorm's comedies. For German television, she appeared in the series directed by Franz Peter Wirth, A Square of Sky (Ein Stück Himmel), which was based on the experiences of Janina Dawidowicz from the Warsaw ghetto; in Die Schmuggler von Rajgrod, directed by Konrad Petzold; and in several segments of the series, The Invisible Sight (Das Unsichtbare Visier), directed by Peter Hagen.

=== American period ===
Since coming to the United States in 1982, Lenka Pichlíková has acted in both university and professional theaters, including productions accredited by the Actors' Equity Association. Her roles include Masha in Chekhov's The Seagull (Theatre West, Fort Worth, Texas), Yelena in Uncle Vanya and Hilda in Ibsen's The Master Builder (University Theater, Richardson, Texas), Lea in Wendy Kesselman's My Sister in This House (Undermain Theater, Dallas, Texas), Joan in Bertolt Brecht's Saint Joan of the Stockyards (Dance Theater Workshop, New York City), Ophelia in Müller's Hamletmachine (Theater for the New City, New York City), and Tamara Sachs in Ronald Harwood's Taking Sides (Stamford Theatre Works, Connecticut). Other roles include Rosebud in Natalie Needs a Nightie and Christina in Drop Zone (Kweskin Theater, Stamford).

Subsequently, Lenka Pichlíková studied with Marcel Marceau in the United States, and has performed as a mime in Mexico, France, Texas, New York, and throughout Connecticut. She was a member of the blacklight theatre company, Ta Fantastika, during their New York City period, 1982 – 1984 (the company is now located in Prague). In 1987, she performed as the lead narrator and mime in segments of The Magic Game, produced in Mexico and performed throughout the southwest United States. She has also created a character dance role, the Duchess, in the original ballet, Alice in Wonderland by Laurie Gage (East Coast Youth Ballet, Stamford). Her mimodrama, Medea, and her mime performance piece, Seven Deadly Sins and a Virtue (the latter inspired by the Baroque statues at the historical spa of Kuks, Czech Republic) have been presented in several states. Medea, for which she wrote, directed, and played the lead, was featured in Connecticut's International Festival of Arts and Ideas in 2001. In 2006, she wrote and performed in the one-person drama, Three Women of Faith, based on the lives of the Abbess Hildegard of Bingen, Queen Sofia of Bavaria (protector of the church reformer, Jan Hus), and Katharina von Bora Luther (Martin Luther's wife and co-worker). In 2006, she was named the Best Mime of Fairfield County, Connecticut by the area news media. In 2014 she performed in her own translation a play by Anna Hodkova, Gertrude, which is a one-woman show about queen Gertrude from Shakespeare's Hamlet.

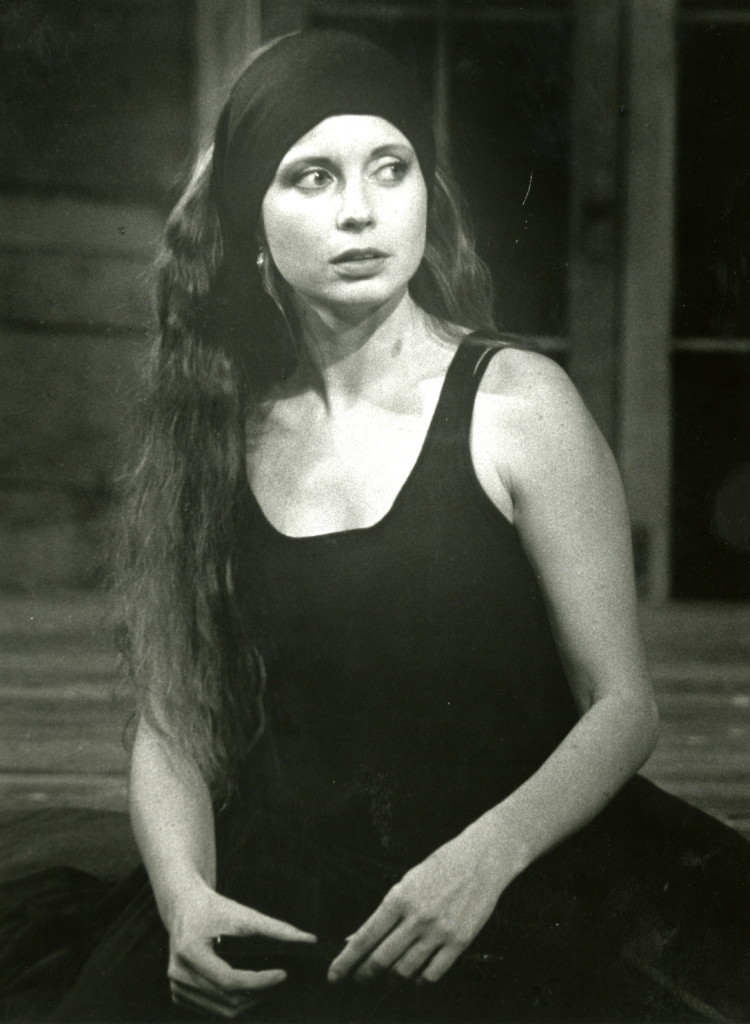
Lenka Pichlíková as Masha in Chekhov's The Seagull (Theatre West, Fort Worth, Texas).

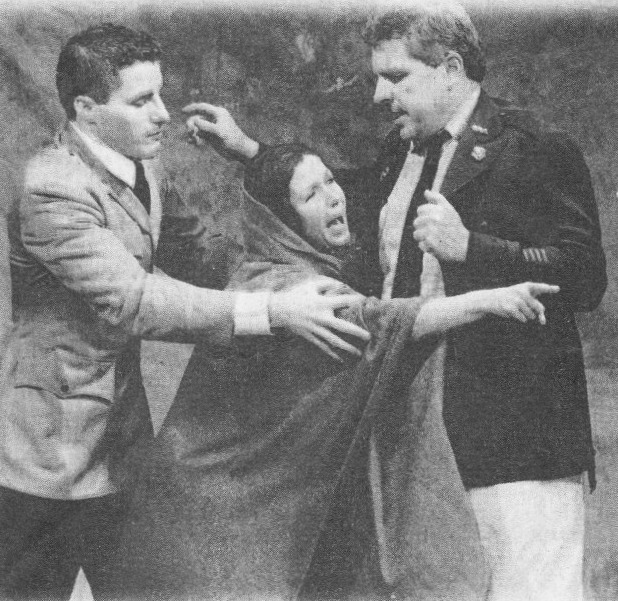
Lenka Pichlíková (at center) as Tamara Sachs in Taking Sides (Stamford Theatre Works, Connecticut, 1999).

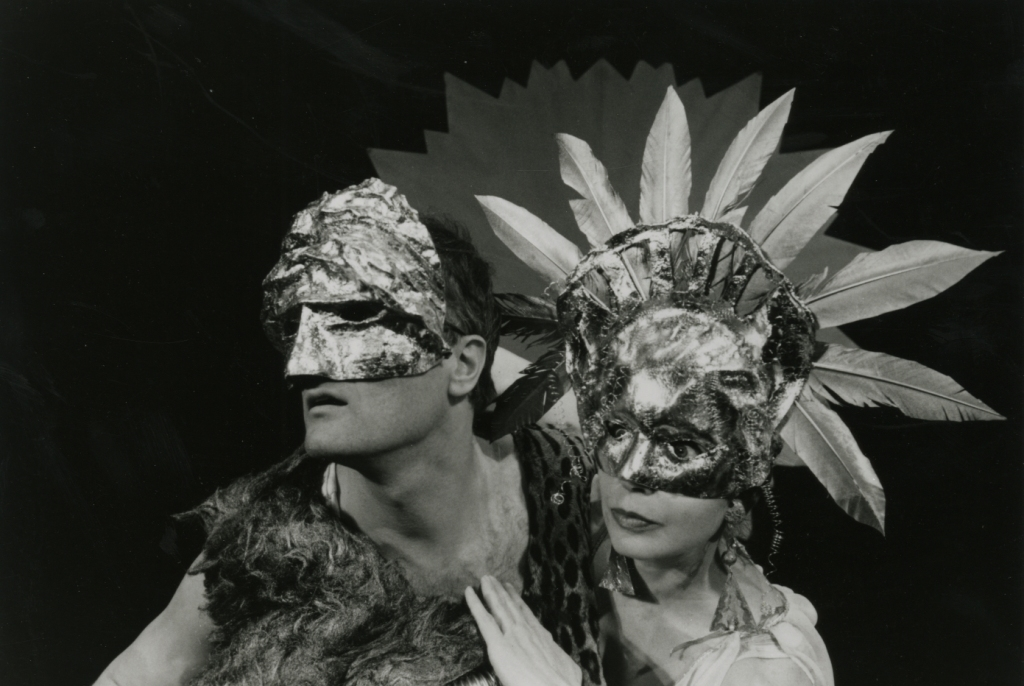
Lenka Pichlíková and Patrick McCluskey in mimodrama Medea (International Festival of Arts and Ideas, 2000).

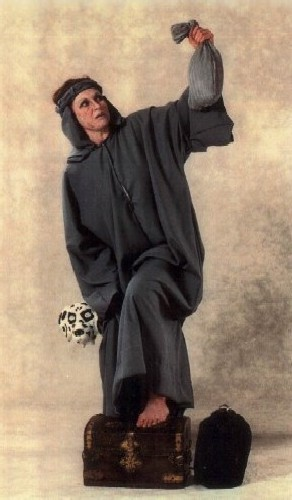
Lenka Pichlíková as Greed in mime performance Seven Deadly Sins and One Virtue (2002).

Lenka Pichlíková currently devotes herself to her own one-person shows, mimodramas, and schools performances, as well as to acting in independent films, teaching, directing, and coaching actors.

Among her recent activities and performances are the following:

- One-woman shows such as Katharina Luther for diverse audiences.
- Hundreds of interactive schools performances and shows for young audiences, including
  - Mother Goose (nursery rhymes and activities for preschool), recipient of grants for underserved communities;
  - Time for Mime (a classic pantomime learning performance), recipient of grants for underserved communities,
  - A Visit from Mrs. Claus (Holiday Storyteller – Christmas / Hanukkah);
  - Kids Kanga-Rules (two-person schools performance on social interaction, manners, and preventing bullying), recipient of grants for underserved communities.
- Workshops, artist-in-residence projects, and arts enrichment programs under the sponsorship of the Connecticut Commission for Culture and Tourism, local schools and boards of education, and private foundations.
- Directing stage plays and musical theatre for adolescents, college students, and adults, including works such as CATS, The Boy Friend, and Pictures from the Insects' Life.
- Directing children's theatre in elementary schools and regional theatres, including works such as Willy Wonka & the Chocolate Factory.
- Featured roles in independent films, including Keep the Lights On (Ira Sachs), Chasing Lost Youth (Nicole Cobb), Apples (Brunella Steger), Butterfingers (Milan Roganovic) and Trophy Kids (Josh Sugarman).
- Television commercials and infomercials, including The Pearl, Diamond Radiance, Amgen Pharmaceuticals, and McNamara Skin Products.
- Translating plays, including Joyce Carol Oates's Tone Clusters and Eclipse, from In Darkest America.
- Scholarly investigations, such as Josef Čapek, Czech Modernist Innovator, for the New York Art Resources Consortium.
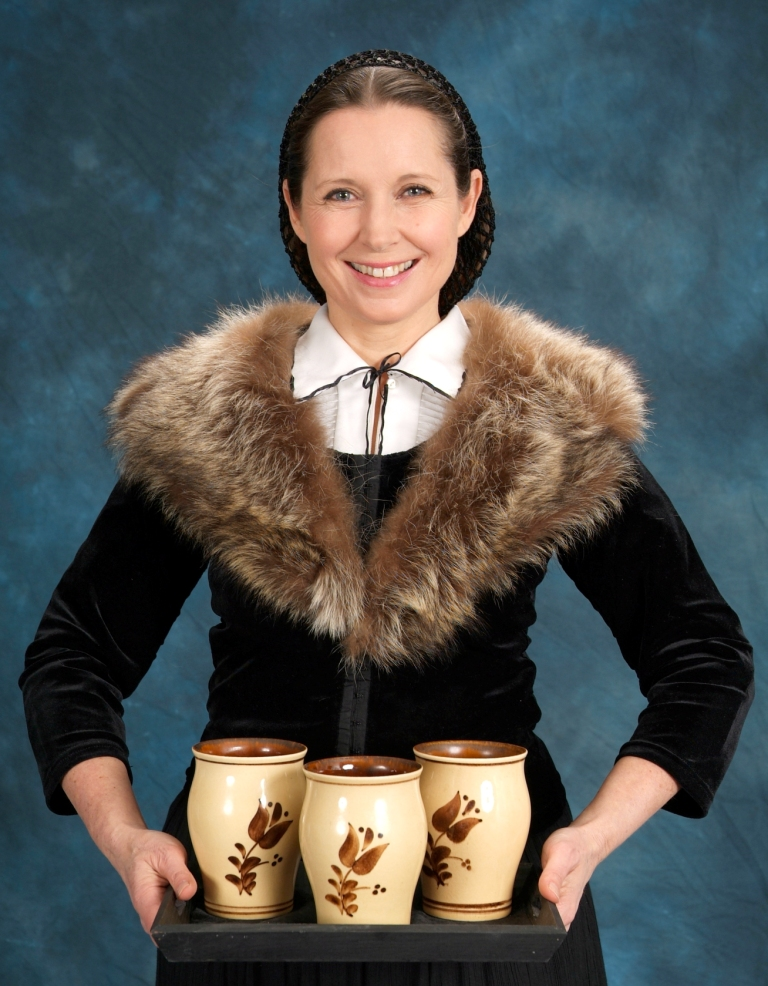
Lenka Pichlíková as Katharina Luther (2010).

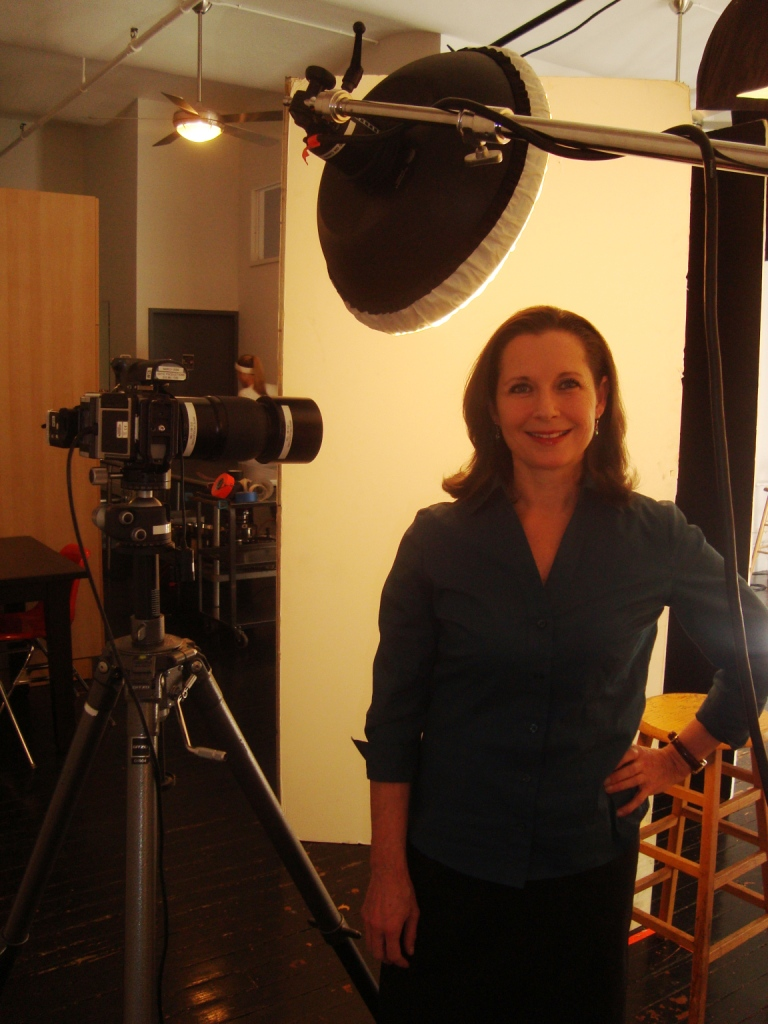
Lenka Pichlíková on location for XXXXX infomercial (New York City 2011).

Lenka Pichlíková teaches acting, other performing arts, dramatic literature, and cultural history in the Conservatory of Theatre Arts, State University of New York at Purchase, at Fairfield University in Connecticut, and at other colleges, as well as having taught in the former School of Performing Arts of Stamford Theatre Works, a professional acting company, also in Connecticut.
