= Herbstmilch =

Herbstmilch may refer to:

- Autumn milk, a type of German soured milk
- Herbstmilch (novel), a 1985 autobiographical novel
- Herbstmilch (film), film based on the novel
