= Lena Beyerling =

German actress

- Born: September 27, 1995 (age 30); Magdeburg, Germany
- Occupations: actor and dubbing artist

Lena Beyerling (born September 27, 1995 in Magdeburg) is a German actor and dubbing artist.

== Life ==
Lena Beyerling first appeared in the media in 1999 in commercials and in 2000 in reports about her family. She played her first film role in the mini TV series Alicia!, which aired in 2002. Since then, she has appeared occasionally in other commercials and in various roles in TV series and films. In July 2005, she appeared as a godmother at the German Film Award ceremony in the Best Children's and Youth Film category on ARD. In 2005/06, she appeared in the Brauner production Der letzte Zug. Under the direction of Vilsmaier, she played the role of Nina Neumann. In 2006, she was a children's reporter for RTL-Exclusiv and MDR.

In September 2006, she sang "Der kleine Eskimo" together with her brother Laurin. The Finnish folk song interpreted by the siblings was released by the record company of producer Jack White. In 2006/07, the siblings appeared with the song in several television shows such as the Weihnachtsshow der Volksmusik

Lena Beyerling was in the spotlight for the first time as a presenter in the fall of 2007. Together with Inka Bause, she hosted the program "Der lange Samstag" on MDR under the motto "Vorsicht Kinder!". In this program, she solicited donations for the construction of a children's hospice and has since been the youngest ambassador for the Stiftung Kinderhospiz Mitteldeutschland Nordhausen. In October 2008, together with Peter Sodann, she performed the ground-breaking ceremony for the construction of the hospice, which was started with the donations. Together with Stefan Mross, she reported from the red carpet of the Henne gala.

== Filmography (selection) ==
- 2002: Alicia! (TV)
- 2002: SOKO Leipzig - Einsame Herzen, Enttäuschte Liebe (TV)
- 2003: Schöne Lügen (TV)
- 2004: Unterwegs (cinema)
- 2005: Wolffs Revier – Herzblut (TV)
- 2005: Die Liebe eines Priesters (TV)
- 2005: LiebesLeben (TV)
- 2006: Der letzte Zug (cinema)
- 2006: In the name of the law (TV)
- 2006: SOKO Wismar – Alone at Home (TV)
- 2007: Die Blüten der Sehnsucht (TV)
- 2007: Die Alpenklinik – Eine Frage des Herzens (TV)
- 2008: Little Dodo (cinema, voice – rhino "Patna")
- 2008: Rosamunde Pilcher - Melodie der Liebe (TV)
- 2008: SOKO Wismar - Lillis Papa (TV)
- 2011: Liebe ohne Minze (TV movie)
