= Werner Stocker (actor) =

German actor (1955–1993)

- Werner Stocker as Darius in Highlander: The Series
- Born: April 7, 1955; Flintsbach am Inn, Bavaria, West Germany
- Died: May 27, 1993 (aged 38); Munich, Bavaria, Germany
- Years active: 1982–1993
- Awards: Bavarian Film Award for Best Young Actor; 1988 Herbstmilch

Werner Stocker (April 7, 1955 – May 27, 1993) was a German actor. He studied acting at the Neue Münchner Schauspielschule and at the Otto Falckenberg School of the Performing Arts.

Stocker appeared in the 1987 American television film The Dirty Dozen: The Deadly Mission.

He is probably best known to English-speaking audiences for his role as Darius, the immortal monk who was Duncan's friend in the first season of "Highlander: The Series" in 1993. It was his final role as he died from a brain tumour in 1993 shortly after finishing filming for the series.

== Highlander: The Series ==
Stocker featured in the fantasy hit Highlander: The Series as Darius, a 2,000-year-old immortal priest.

The script of the episode "Band of Brothers" describes Darius as a monk with a "hideously ugly face", but when the producers cast the part, they chose Stocker, who did not fit this description. Creative Consultant David Abramovitz explains, "Darius, originally in the script, was written as almost to look like the Hunchback of Notre Dame, to be physically ugly and with a glorious soul. And when I got to France, I noticed that they cast this young, handsome German actor named Werner Stocker. I said, 'Wait a minute. What's going on here? He's supposed to be ugly.' And it seemed that the Germans, who were putting up a great deal of money, didn't want the only German actor in the show to be ugly; so he wasn't ugly. And this was one of the cases where politics won out and it didn't hurt anything because he was wonderful in the part."

Associate Creative Consultant Donna Lettow says about Darius' character development, "It was always planned that Darius would die in "The Hunters". The original plan for Darius was that he would reappear in flashbacks, much like Fitzcairn does now." Abramovitz confirms, "Darius would have played a bigger part in the show, but Werner passed away." Stocker's unexpected illness effectively prevented this. Producer Bill Panzer remembers that Stocker "had announced that he had a brain tumor," and that it happened "before we started shooting ["The Hunters"], just before. It involved a tremendous amount of rewriting." The season 1 promotional booklet recounts, "Just days before going into production actor Werner Stocker was stricken ill and was unable to work. By now the character of Darius had become an integral part of the story and the writers had to scramble to adjust the story line." Abramovitz recalls, "This was the episode when we learned that Werner Stocker was extremely ill. (...) I got a call at three o'clock in the morning, saying Werner would not be available, we were shooting in a day and a half, and there was fear if we were going to have to shut down. I went into work, wrote twenty-five straight hours, without a break, and got out a script and the show went on and it turned out pretty well." The promotional booklet further says, "Footage from previous episodes was successfully used to fill in for the absent actor and the season finale went on to mark a huge shift in the Highlander saga, forever altering the future of the series with the introduction of "Hunters" and "Watchers"."

Commenting on Stocker's performance as Darius, Abramovitz says, "He had an elegance, presence, and I was happy with the episode "Band of Brothers"." Adrian Paul thinks, "[He] had a very ethereal quality himself and I think Werner played [Darius] very well." The promotional booklet reports that Darius was "played with soulful grace by (...) Stocker. Stocker was an instant hit with fans." Stocker died on May 27, 1993, of a brain tumor. The episodes "Unholy Alliance" and "Unholy Alliance Part Two" are dedicated to him.

== Awards ==
- 1983 German Actor Award (Deutscher Darstellerpreis) as Best Young Actor
- 1988 Bavarian Film Award (Bayerischer Filmpreis) shared with Dana Vávrová for Herbstmilch, Best Young Actors
- 1989 German Film Award in Gold shared with Dana Vávrová

== Filmography ==
- 1977 - Les rebelles (TV miniseries)
- 1980 - The Ungrateful, directed by Franz Josef Wild (TV film)
- 1980 - SOKO 5113 (TV series) "Rosis Brüder" Part 1 and Part 2
- 1981 - Exil, directed by Egon Günther (TV miniseries)
- 1981 - Der Richter, directed by Stephan Meyer (TV film) ... Edwin
- 1981 - Collin, directed by Peter Schulze-Rohr (TV film) ... Peter Urack
- 1982 - Warum hast du so trauige Augen, directed by Tom Toelle (TV film)
- 1982 - Die Weiße Rose, directed by Michael Verhoeven ... Christoph Probst
- 1982 - Die fünfte Jahreszeit (TV miniseries) ... Leopold Perwanger
- 1984 - Derrick (TV series) - Season 11, Episode 02: "Die Verführung" ... Willi Stein
- 1984 - Abenteuer aus dem Englischen Garten, directed by Margit Saad (TV film) ... Emil
- 1984 - A Man Like E.V.A., directed by Radu Gabrea ... Walter/Armand
- 1984 - Rambo Zambo, directed by Reinhard Donga (TV film) ... Xaver
- 1984 - The Old Fox (TV Series) - Episode 80: "Reihe 7 Grab 11" ... Ludwig Huber
- 1984 - Die Wiesingers, directed by Bernd Fischerauer (TV series, Episodes 1-10) ... Ferdinand Wiesinger
- 1984 - The Last Civilian, directed by Laurent Heynemann (TV film) ... Hungrich
- 1985 - Die Unbekannten im eigenen Haus, directed by Bernd Fischerauer (TV film) ... Luska
- 1985 - Flight into Hell, directed by Gordon Flemyng (TV miniseries) ... Adolph Klausmann
- 1985 - November Moon, directed by Alexandra von Grote ... Hoffmann
- 1986 - Schafkopfrennen, directed by Bernd Fischerauer (TV miniseries) ... Kalle Grossmann
- 1986 - Now or Never, directed by Christel Buschmann ... Tom
- 1987 - The Dirty Dozen: The Deadly Mission, directed by Lee H. Katzin (TV film) ... SS Sergeant
- 1987 - Aquaplaning, directed by Eva Hiller (TV film) ... Herrmann Ort
- 1988 - Der Condor, directed by Jobst Oetzmann (Short)
- 1988 - Die Wiesingers, directed by Bernd Fischerauer (TV series, Episodes 10-20) ... Ferdinand Wiesinger
- 1988 - Ein Fall für zwei (TV Series) Episode 59: "Die einzige Chance" ... Thomas Stelzer
- 1989 - SOKO 5113 (TV series) "Der große Bruder" ... Richard
- 1989 - Herbstmilch, directed by Joseph Vilsmaier ... Albert Wimschneider
- 1990 - The Private War of Lucinda Smith, directed by Ray Alchin (TV miniseries) ... Hans
- 1991 - Lex Minister, directed by Peter Patzak
- 1991 - Rama dama, directed by Joseph Vilsmaier ... Hans Stadler
- 1991 - Saint Peter's Snow, directed by Peter Patzak ... Dr. Amberg
- 1992 - Far from Berlin, directed by Keith McNally ... Dieter Hausmann
- 1992 - Shadows of Love, directed by Christoph Vorster ... Tom
- 1992 - Samba Syndrom, directed by Achim Lenz
- 1992 - Terror Stalks the Class Reunion, directed by Clive Donner ... Franz
- 1993 - Rosenemil, with Dana Vávrová, directed by Radu Gabrea ... Emil Lehmann
- 1993 - Highlander (TV series)

The Hunters (1993) … Darius
Saving Grace (1993) … Darius
The Beast Below (1993) … Darius
For Tomorrow We Die (1993) … Darius
Band of Brothers (1993) … Darius

== See also ==
- List of brain tumor patients
