= Harald Feller (organist) =

German organist, choral conductor, composer and academic

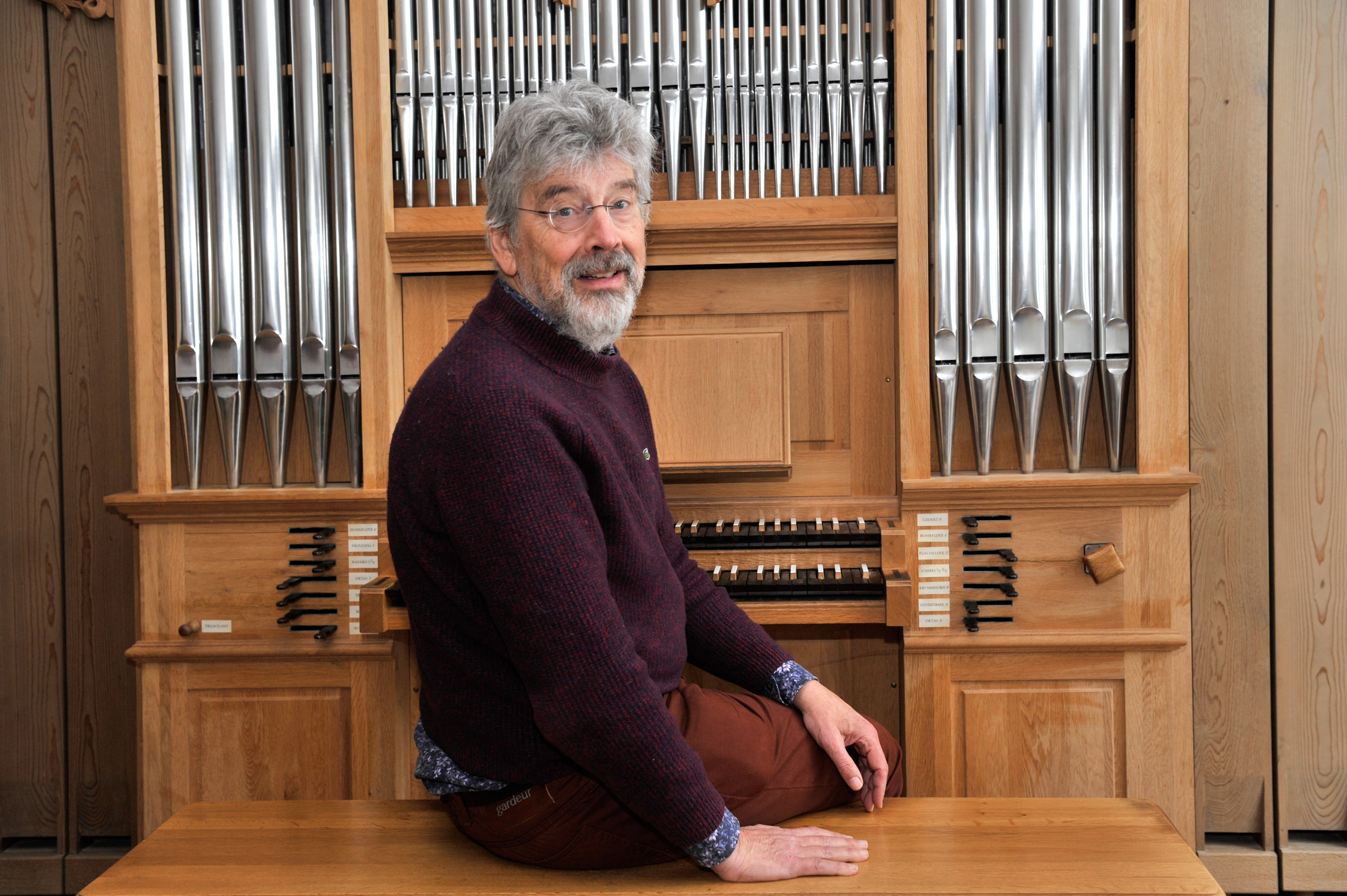
- Harald Feller (2022)
- Born: 1951 (age 73–74); Munich, Bavaria, Germany
- Occupations: Organist; Choral conductor; Composer; Academic teacher
- Organizations: Hochschule für Musik und Theater München

Harald Feller (born 1951 in Munich) is a German organist, choral conductor and composer teaching at the Hochschule für Musik und Theater München. He was awarded the 1983 Grand Prix du Disque Liszt.

== Career ==
Feller studied organ at the University of Music and Performing Arts Munich with Franz Lehrndorfer and church music and deepened his studies with Marie-Claire Alain in Paris. In 1978 he took over a teaching position at the Hochschule für Musik und Theater Munich and in 1980 became a lecturer at the Hochschule für Katholische Kirchenmusik und Musikpädagogik Regensburg. Since 1983 he has been professor for organ at the Hochschule für Musik und Theater Munich.

Feller can boast international concert activity and CD and radio recordings. He recorded the organ parts for the film Brother of Sleep.

== Awards ==
- Stipendium der Studienstiftung des Deutschen Volkes
- Förderpreis für Musik des Bayerischen Staates
- Grand Prix international du disque Liszt
- Deutsches Studienzentrum in Venedig (Venice)

== Competitions ==
- 1976: Felix Mottlpreis München
- 1978: Felix Mendelssohn Bartholdy Prize
- 1979: 3rd prize in the competition of the Internationale Orgelwoche Nürnberg
- 1983: Improvisation prize in Haarlem (Netherlands)
- 2007: Composition Prize for the 100th Anniversary of the Berlin Cathedral.

== Compositions ==
Organ solo

- Diptychon (Bärenreiter)
- Danse sacrée (Verlag Böhm und Sohn)
- Te Deum for Organ (Schott)
- Poème funèbre for Organ (Schott)
- Due pezzi per l’organo
- „Gregorianische Miniaturen“
- „Suite Leonesa“
- Meditationsfantasie (Verlag Böhm und Sohn)
- „Nada“
- 4 pieces about BACH
- Fantasy for 2 organs
- For Young Persons Guide to the Organ (Schott)

Organ and other instruments

- Fantasy about a theme by J. Brahms for trumpet and organ (Schott)
- Sonate für Trompete und Orgel
- "Ettaler Sonata" for flute and organ
- "Panta rhei" for percussion and organ
- "Danse macabre" for percussion and organ
- Adagio for cello and organ

Organ and Orchestra

- Concertino festivo for organ, 8 brass instruments and percussion
- Concerto for Organ and Orchestra
- Symphony for Organ and Orchestra

Piano solo

- Die Planeten
- Three piano pieces on Gregorian themes
- Toccata
- Concertino for two pianos
- 4 Nocturnes
- Krabat - Suite, Twelve light character pieces based on literary motifs from the novel of the same name by Otfried Preußler
- Ragtime

Cembalo solo

- Toccata
- Suite
- Un petit concert for 3 Cembali

Chamber music

- Fantasy for trombone quartet (Edition Brand)
- 2 miniatures for oboe, piano, cello and double bass
- Sonata for flute and piano
- Heptameron for flute and piano
- Suite for flute and piano
- Gedanken for flute and piano (harp)
- Fantasy for 13 brass players
- Variations on an Old English Song for piccolo flute and Marimba
- Mouvements for bassoon, tuba, piano and accordion
- Prière for English horn and string quintet (or Organ)
- 5 miniatures for flute solo

Sacred Music

Choir a cappella

- Two Advent motets
- 4 Christmas motets for four- to eight-voice mixed choir (Verlag Helbling)
- Two motets after texts by Hildegard von Bingen (Verlag Helbling)
- Motet based on biblical texts for four-part mixed choir
- "Mantra" for 7-part mixed choir
- 22. Psalm for 8-part mixed choir
- "Missa mundi" for 7-voice mixed choir
- "Missa brevis" for 7-voice mixed choir
- Missa for 4-8-part mixed choir
- "In Nativitate Domini" for 3 male voices
- "Ave Maria" for 8-voice mixed choir
- "Our Father" for 7-voice mixed choir
- "Gott unser Ursprung" (J.Henkys) (Strube-Verlag)
- choral movements after the choral arrangements of Brahms
- carols

Choir with Instruments

- "Missa a 3" three-part mixed choir, flute, string sextet and organ (Verlag Strube)
- "Agnus Dei" for 4-6-part mixed choir, 4 brass instruments and organ
- "Missa canonica" for four-part mixed choir (solos ad lib.), 5 strings and organ
- Missa in Nativitate Domini for Soloists, choir and orchestra
- Feldafinger Messe for 7-part mixed choir, orchestra and organ
- Credo for 4 to 6-part mixed choir, orchestra and organ (own version, for choir and organ)
- Si è congedato (Text: Heinz Grill) Music for a deceased for four-part mixed choir and organ
- 3 Spirituals for four-part mixed choir and piano
- Messe brève for soprano solo, three-part women's (children's) choir and organ (Strube)
- Christmas song phrases

Soli with Instruments

- Canti mariani four Marienmotetten for mezzo-soprano, countertenor and orchestra (organ version)
- Requiem for 3 male voices and string sextet
- Michaelshymne (text Heinz Grill) for soprano, harp and organ
- Sonnengesang des St. Franziskus for soprano, mezzo-soprano, baritone and organ (orchestral version with solos and choir)
- Mass 85 for three female voices, organ and harp

Liturgical music

- children's mass (Schott)
- Veni creator for 4-8-part mixed choir, large orchestra, parish singing and organ
- O sacrum convivium for baritone solo, four-part mixed choir, orchestra, organ and parish singing

Oratorical and scenic works

- Tolle lege or the Conversion of Augustin for 4-7-part mixed choir, 8 brass instruments, percussion and organ
- Oberuferer Christgeburtspiel for solos, choir and instruments

Secular choral music

- 5 choirs after texts by Christian Morgenstern for 4-part mixed choir
- 3 choirs after lyrics by Rilke
- Six German folk songs for eight-part mixed choir

Lieder

- Ave Maria for soprano (tenor) and organ (Schott)
- Der immerwährende Seelenkalender (Rudolf Steiner) for baritone (Mezzosopran) and piano (Stephan Wunderlich Verlag)
- Lieder after texts by R. Steiner and H. Grill for voice and piano
- Sanskrit song movements for voice and piano (Stephan Wunderlich-Verlag)
- Psalm 125 for soprano and organ
- 7 Christmas Songs for soprano and piano (orchestra)

Adaptations

for organ solo

- Johann Sebastian Bach: Sinfonia for BWV 29 Ratswahlkantate
- Franz Liszt: Von der Wiege bis zum Grabe (Schott)
- Franz Liszt: Notturno No. 3
- Wolfgang Amadeus Mozart: Ouverture
- Wolfgang Amadeus Mozart: Adagio-Allegro-Adagio
- John Williams: Star-Wars-Suite

Instrumental music

- Ludwig van Beethoven: 3 flute clock pieces as sonata for flute and organ (2nd version with piano)
- Johannes Brahms: Herzlich tut mich verlangen for 4 cellos
- Johannes Brahms: Fugue in A flat minor for 4 cellos
- Johann Baptist Georg Neruda: Concert for Trumpet and organ
- Henry Purcell: Sonata for trumpete and orgen
- Max Reger: Adagio from the cello solo suite, arranged for 4 cellos
- Christian Heinrich Rinck: Flute concerto for flute and organ
- Gioachino Rossini: Fantasy for clarinet and organ
- Robert Schumann: 4 sketches for 2 pianos
- Louis Vierne: Clair de lune and Naiades for flute, strings and harp
- Lefébure-Wély: 4 pieces for 8 brass instruments
- Works by Mozart, Rossini, Vierne, Vivaldi, Gluck for flute and organ

Vocal music

- Felix Mendelssohn Bartholdy: Dominica il post Pascha for female voices, strings and organ
- Otto Nicolai: Ein feste Burg (for 4 trumpets, 4 trombones, four-part mixed choir, organ) (Verlag Strube)
- Max Reger: Requiem op. 144 for alto solo, choir and organ
- Louis Roessel: Kavatine for soprano, four-part mixed choir and organ (Verlag Helbling)
- Geistl. Songs by G. Bizet, A. Dvorak, H. Wolf and Max Reger for soprano, harp and organ
- Sacred songs, Arias and duets (by Beethoven, Brahms, G. Fauré, C. Franck, Mendelssohn, Mozart) for soprano and organ
- Sacred songs by Brahms, Beethoven, Wolf, Reger for soprano or baritone and chamber orchestra

Miscellaneous

- "Rag" for chamber orchestra
- "Communio" for flute and strings
- "Ohrensausen" (Gustav Meyrinck) Melodrama for narrator and piano

== Discography (selection) ==
- Franz Liszt / Julius Reubke. Harald Feller an der Klais-Orgel des Münsters zu Ingolstadt (Calig; 1981)
- Concerts for Trumpet and Organ / Konzerte für Trompete und Orgel. Works of Purcell, Krebs, Neruda, Schilling. With Bernhard Schmid, trumpet (Aurophon; 1989)
- Die Orgel im Dom zu Passau. Works of Bach, Liszt, Schumann, Reger (Ars Musici; 1989)
- Richard Wagner. Bearbeitungen für Orgel. Arrangements of Liszt, Karg-Elert, Lemare, Feller (Ars Musici; 1991)
- Olivier Messiaen. La Nativité Du Seigneur (Calig; 1993)
- Olivier Messiaen, Maurice Duruflé, Charles Tournemire. Messe De La Pentecôte (Calig; 1993)
- Berühmte Orgelwerke des Barock – Famous Baroque Organ Pieces. Works of Carl P. E. Bach, Haydn, Händel. With the Capella Istropolitana (Classica D'Oro; 1994)
- Orgelimprovisationen zum Film „Schlafes Bruder“. Film music by Hubert von Goisern und Enjott Schneider (Ariola; 1995)
- Marcel Dupré. Chemin de la Croix (Calig, 1996)
- Phantômes: An Organ Spectacular. Works of Bach, Rossini, Vierne, Rota, Williams, Schneider (Oehms Classics; 2006)
- Geistliche Lieder der Romantik – Sacred Songs of the Romantic Period. With Susanne Bernhard, soprano; Maria Graf, harp (Oehms Classics; 2009)
- Nun freut euch, liebe Christen – Weihnachtliche Orgelmusik. Works of Reger (Oehms Classics; 2010)
- Der immerwährende Seelenkalender. Setting of The Calendar of the Soul of Rudolf Steiner. With Andreas Burkhart, baritone; Markus Bellheim, piano (Stephan Wunderlich Verlag; 2016)
- O Magnum Mysterium – Weihnachtslieder und Chöre von Harald Feller. With Susanne Bernhard, soprano; Markus Bellheim, piano; Carl-Orff-Chor Marktoberdorf, Conductor: Stefan Wolitz; Vokalensemble Animato (Stephan Wunderlich Verlag; 2017)
