= Schlafes Bruder =

1992 novel by Robert Schneider

- 1992 paperback cover
- Author: Robert Schneider
- Language: German
- Genre: Novel
- Published: 1992
- Publisher: Reclam
- Publication place: Austria
- English publication date: 1995

Schlafes Bruder (German for 'Sleep's brother') is a novel by Austrian writer Robert Schneider, first published in German in 1992. It was an international success and was adapted into a feature film and an opera, among others.

== History ==
The plot is set in an Austrian mountain village in the 19th century. The protagonists (Elias, Peter and Elsbeth) face hardship and fate which they cannot understand nor prevent. The title is derived from Greek mythology, where Hypnos, god of sleep, is the brother of Thanatos, god of death. A chorale which Bach set to conclude his cantata Ich will den Kreuzstab gerne tragen, BWV 56, which uses the same image, plays a role in the story.

The book is the first part of a trilogy, followed by Die Luftgängerin and Die Unberührten.

The book was first published in 1992 by Reclam. It was an immediate success in Europe and has been translated into 36 languages. The first English-language edition was published by The Overlook Press in 1995 under the title Brother of Sleep.

== Plot ==
The protagonist, Johannes Elias Alder, called Elias, is born in a small mountain village in Vorarlberg. He is a gifted musician, training his voice and able to imitate all villagers. Peter, his cousin of about the same age, is fascinated by him. Elias secretly practices the organ at night, with Peter assisting him.

When the boys are twelve years old, Peter, who is abused by his father, sets fire to his parents' farm on Christmas Day. Elias, who discovers the flames first, rescues Peter's sister Elsbeth. More than half the village burns down during the fire. Elias doesn't tell anyone that Peter was the perpetrator of the fire, for love of his only friend.

Elias grows up to a good-looking and ambitious young man. After the organist and teacher commits suicide, Elias becomes his successor. He loves Elsbeth. Peter is jealous and arranges a marriage of Elsbeth and Lukas, the son of a wealthy farmer. Elias has a vision in a desperate night when he struggles with God. He loses his love for Elsbeth and becomes depressed.

When Elias is 22 years old, the cathedral organist of Feldberg listens to his organ playing and invites him to an organ festival. There, Elias plays an improvisation on the chorale "Komm, o Tod, du Schlafes Bruder" from Bach's cantata Ich will den Kreuzstab gerne tragen, fascinating all listeners. His love for Elsbeth is revived and he decides to take his own life, according to the thoughts expressed in the chorale. He tries to sleep no more and dies, buried by Peter.

== Adaptations ==
In 1995, Joseph Vilsmaier directed a film Schlafes Bruder (Brother of Sleep), with André Eisermann as Elias, Ben Becker as Peter, and Dana Vávrová as Elsbeth. It won several awards and was nominated in 1996 for the Golden Globe in "Best Foreign Language Film."

In 1994/95, Herbert Willi composed an opera Schlafes Bruder to a libretto by Robert Schneider on a commission by the Zurich Opera House to celebrate 1000 Years Austria. It premiered on 19 May 1996 and the production was invited to the Wiener Festwochen of 1996. In 2005, the German metal band Helangår set the novel to music.
