= The Last Train (2006 film) =

Der Letzte Zug The Last Train
- Theatrical release poster
- Directed by: Joseph Vilsmaier; Dana Vávrová
- Written by: Stephen Glantz
- Produced by: Artur Brauner
- Starring: Gedeon Burkhard; Lale Yavas; Lena Beyerling
- Cinematography: Helmfried Kober; Joseph Vilsmaier
- Edited by: Uli Schön
- Music by: Chris Heyne
- Production companies: Central Cinema Company Film (CCC), Diamant Film
- Distributed by: Bontonfilm
- Release dates: October 26, 2006 (2006 Hof International Film Festival); November 9, 2006 (Germany); October 11, 2007 (Czech Republic); January 11, 2008 (Spain)
- Running time: 123 minutes
- Countries: Germany; Czech Republic
- Languages: German; Hebrew; Polish; French; Ukrainian
- Budget: €2.7 million
- Box office: $427,456

The Last Train (German: Der letzte Zug) is a 2006 German film directed by Joseph Vilsmaier and Dana Vávrová, and starring Gedeon Burkhard, Lale Yavas, and Lena Beyerling.

The film depicts the fate of some of the last remaining Jews in Berlin, who in April 1943 were rounded up at the Berlin-Grunewald station and sent to the Nazi concentration camp at Auschwitz. The film stands out due to its proximity as well as the unsparing realism with which the brutality of a transport to the Auschwitz concentration camp appears.

== Casting ==
- Gedeon Burkhard, Henry Neumann
- Lale Yavas, Lea Neumann
- Lena Beyerling, Nina Neumann
- Sibel Kekilli, Ruth Zilbermann
- Roman Roth, Albert Rosen
- Brigitee Grothum, Gabrielle Hellman
- Hans-Jürgen Silbermann, Jakob Noschik
- Sharon Brauner, Erika Friedlich
- Juraj Kukura, Dr. Friedlich
- Ludwig Blochberger, Crewes

== Background ==
Der letze Zug was filmed in Germany and Czech Republic and went into production in May 2005 on a budget of €2.7 million. During filming, director Joseph Vilsmaier fell from a crane and suffered permanent, albeit minor, injuries. Production halted for two weeks while he was hospitalized. Filming resumed once Vilsmaier recovered, but his wife, actress Dana Vávrová took over directing duties while Vilsmaier supervised.

The film premiered on May 20, 2006 at the 40th Hof International Film Festival. It was widely released in theaters in Germany by The Central Cinema Company on November 9, 2006, the 68th anniversary of Kristallnacht.

The musical score by Chris Heyne utilised Jewish music, primarily in flashbacks, to establish the characters' identity in the film, as well as incorporating original orchestral underscore and pre-existing classical music.

== Reception ==
Eddie Cockrell of Variety stated it had "erratic production values and one-dimensional characterizations" and it is "destined for specialty fests and undiscerning cablers, with solid ancillary classroom use".
