= Herbstmilch (novel) =

Herbstmilch (English: Autumn Milk) is the German autobiography of Anna Wimschneider (1919–1993), a peasant woman from Lower Bavaria. It was published in 1984. Although it is the autobiography of an unknown, 'ordinary' person, the book became a huge bestseller and remained in the bestseller charts for three years.

The title derives from the Bavarian word for a type of fermented milk, from which soup is made.

== Story ==
Wimschneider tells of the hard conditions in which she grew up, on a farm. In 1927, at the age of 8, after her mother's death, she had to look after her family of 9. She later married Albert Wimschneider, but he was then conscripted and went off to war, leaving Anna to look after their farm, together with her mother-in-law.

== Film ==
The book was made into a film, titled Autumn Milk, in 1988 by Joseph Vilsmaier.
