= Die Wiesingers =

- Directed by: Bernd Fischerauer
- Starring: Irene Clarin; Hans-Reinhard Müller; Heide Ackermann; Werner Asam; Bernhard Helfrich; Diane Stolojan; Werner Stocker; Elmar Wepper; Gerd Fitz
- Country of origin: Germany
- No. of seasons: 2
- No. of episodes: 20

Production
- Producer: Hans Gottschalk
- Running time: 45 Minutes

Original release
- Network: Bayerischer Rundfunk
- Release: 1984 – 1989

Die Wiesingers is a German television series that was produced by Bayerischer Rundfunk.

== Overview ==
The series describes the life and suffering of the brewery owner family Wiesinger over a period of more than 30 years. It begins immediately before the turn of the 20th. Century, when Bavaria is still ruled by the Prince Regent, leads through the turmoil of war and revolution, shows the opportunities and risks of the 1920s and finally ends with the seizure of power by the National Socialists.

The family life of the extremely wealthy family is shaped on the one hand by the business ups and downs of the brewery, on the other hand by the difficult personality of the head of the family, Anton Wiesinger. He is a typical patriarch and tends to make important decisions for himself alone in the "silent chamber" and often not even inform the family. He behaves authoritatively and patronizing towards his adult children. While son Ferdl basically can't please him, daughter Theres is overly guarded by him. Only Toni can develop relatively unburdened in the slipstream of the siblings. Anton's first marriage to Gabriele also suffers from his frequent infidelity. After her accidental death, he marries the much younger Frenchwoman, Lisette.

Son Ferdl suffers particularly from his father's despotic traits. Although he is to become his successor in the company, he is still given little responsibility from him at the age of thirty and does not receive any recognition for his achievements. Finally, there is a serious rift between father and son. Ferdl takes a job in America and leaves Germany. From then on, Anton largely denies his existence and refers to Toni as his only son. It is only at the beginning of the twenties that a reconciliation occurs when Ferdl returns on Lisette's initiative to save the brewery with his hard dollars. This had fallen into serious difficulties during the period of inflation.

Son Toni, who had actually taken up the officer career, is brought from his father to the company after Ferdl's departure. Unlike his brother, he can successfully defend himself against Anton's interference and persuade him to withdraw from the brewery. A little later, however, the First World War breaks out and Toni volunteers to join the military. So the old Commercial Council has to take over the management of the company again. In contrast to the ubiquitous enthusiasm for war, Anton is opposed to the war from the beginning - out of concern for Toni. This is confirmed when Toni is missing in the course of the acts of war. This condition lasts so long that it is already generally considered dead. However, after the end of the war, he returns. However, it turns out that he was severely traumatized by his war experiences. He suffers from a variety of psychological problems and becomes a drug addict.

Daughter Theres suffered a riding accident as a teenager and has had a limp since then. This affects her self-esteem and has a negative impact on their lives for a long time. Thus, her relationship with the fun-loving and uncomplicated hop trader's son Franz Xaver Brandl fails, among other things, due to Theres' biased handling of the basically harmless disability. During the war, Theres works as a nurse in a military hospital, which gives her more self-confidence. At work, she gets to know the amputated teacher Wolfgang Oberlein. Later, both get married and have a daughter.

In the course of the late twenties, the family breaks apart more and more. Lisette begins an affair with Ferdl, but soon leaves him and returns to France. Anton first turns to a former lover, then to the younger sister of his first wife and loses more and more contact with reality. Toni is getting deeper and deeper into the vicious circle of dependence. The German-national-minded Wolfgang Oberlein believes he has found a political home in the up-and-coming NSDAP, which, however, comes to an abrupt end when he learns about the Jewish origin of his long-deceased father. The brewery, which has been converted into a public limited company, is infiltrated by a speculator and ultimately swallowed.

The death of the Commercial Council, which almost exactly coincides with the seizure of power by the National Socialists, finally marks the irrevocable end of an era.

== See also ==
- List of German television series
