= Robert Schneider (writer) =

Austrian writer (born 1961)

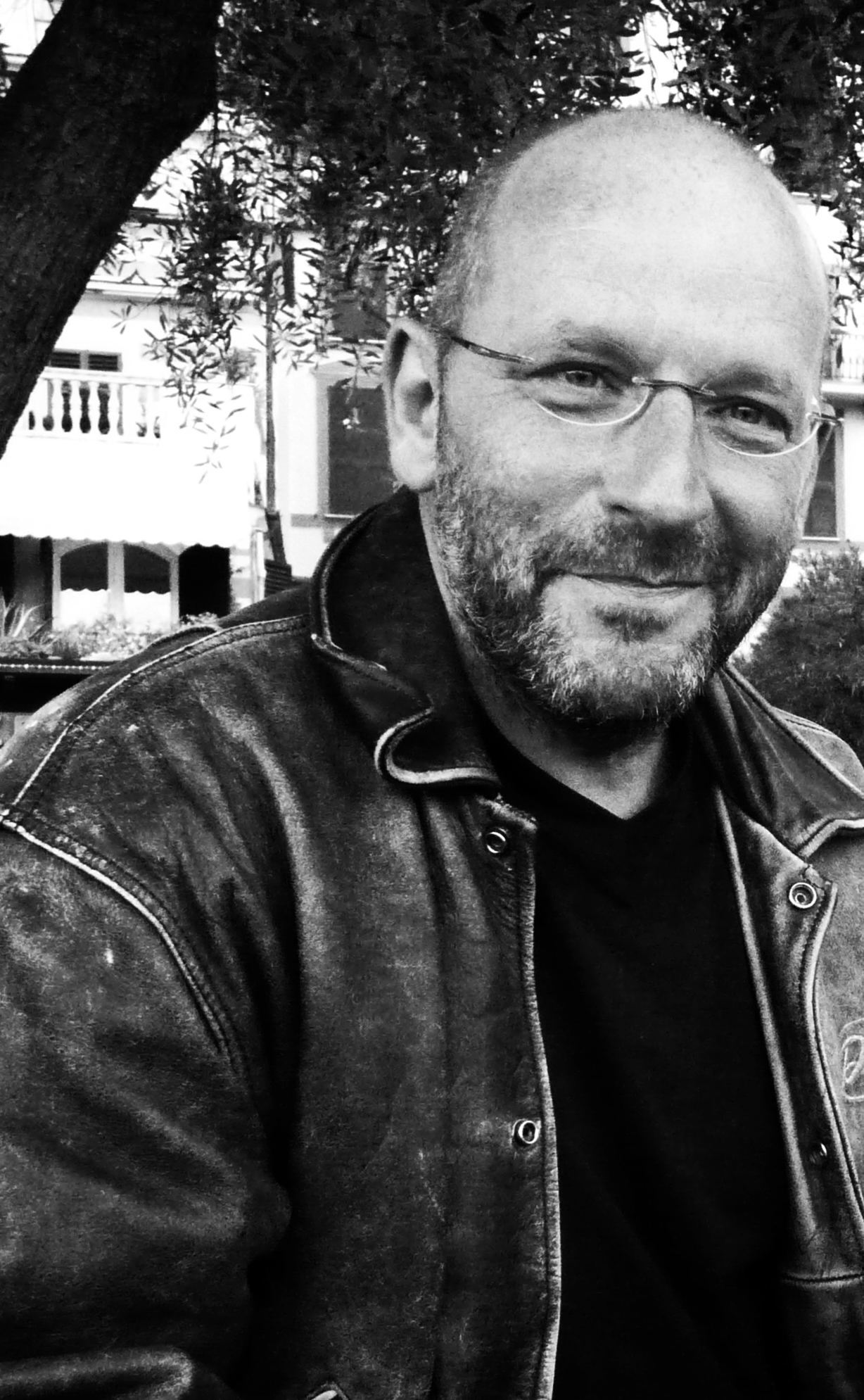
- The author when receiving L’Apocalisse in Rome, 2010
- Born: 16 June 1961 (age 64); Bregenz, Vorarlberg, Austria
- Occupations: Writer; Novelist
- Awards: Prix Médicis; Grinzane Cavour Prize

Robert Schneider (16 June 1961) is an Austrian writer, who published novels including Schlafes Bruder, texts for the theatre, and poetry. His works have been translated into many languages. Schlafes Bruder became the basis of a film, a ballet, an opera and several plays, and received international awards. Schneider withdrew from writing in 2007.

== Career ==
Born in Bregenz, Vorarlberg, Austria, Schneider was adopted at age two by a couple of peasants and grew up in the village of Meschach near Götzis, where he still lives as a freelance writer. He studied composition, theatre sciences and art history in Vienna from 1981 to 1986. He discontinued his studies to become a writer, making a living by working as a tourist guide and organist. He received several scholarships for literature.

His first novel, Schlafes Bruder (Brother of Sleep), was rejected by 24 publishers, and finally appeared in 1992 by Reclam in Leipzig. The book, telling the fictional story of the musician Johannes Elias Alder, became an international success, was translated into many languages, and was made part of school canons. A film version was made in 1995, directed by Joseph Vilsmaier, which became the basis for a ballet at the Pfalztheater in Kaiserslautern, an opera by Herbert Willi, and several plays.

Schneider's second novel, Die Luftgängerin, appeared in 1998, dealing with the rise and fall of the fictional town of Jakobsroth in the Rhine valley. The work received scathing reviews. Schneider conceived the novels as part of a trilogy, Rheintalische Trilogie (Trilogy of the Rhine Valley). He completed the trilogy with Die Unberührten, published in 2000. Based on historical events, it tells the story of two peasant children who are sent to the United States during the Great Depression. Schneider lived in the US for a while to research there. His novel Kristus tells the story of Jan Beukels (John of Leiden), an anabaptist who led the Münster rebellion. Schneider's 2007 novel Die Offenbarung (The Revelation) deals with the finding of a score by Bach, which ruins the life of the lucky musicologist from Naumburg.

Schneider named traditional Austrian storytelling until 1945 as the basis for his work. He refuses to comment on his books, saying: "Alles, was ein Schriftsteller über seine Bücher sagt, kann nur verstören. Sie müssen ihren Weg ohne ihn gehen" (Everything an author can say about his books can only unsettle. They have to go their way without him). In an interview in 2014, he said that books are media of the 19th century which do not function anymore.

== Awards ==
Schneider has received several scholarships and awards, including:

- 1990: Landespreis für Volkstheaterstücke, for Traum und Trauer des jungen H.
- 1993: Prize of the Potsdamer Theatertage, for Dreck – Über die Angst vor dem Fremden
- 1993: Alemannischer Literaturpreis
- 1993: Robert Musil scholarship of Vienna
- 1994: Literature prize of the Salzburg Easter Festival
- 1994: Prix Médicis Étranger
- 1994: Premio Grinzane Cavour
- 1994: Civis Media Prize, audio play prize of the WDR
- 1995: Marieluise-Fleißer-Preis
- 1995: Premio Itas del Libro di Montagna (Trento)
- 2008: Phantastik-Preis der Stadt Wetzlar, for Die Offenbarung

== Works ==
=== Novels ===
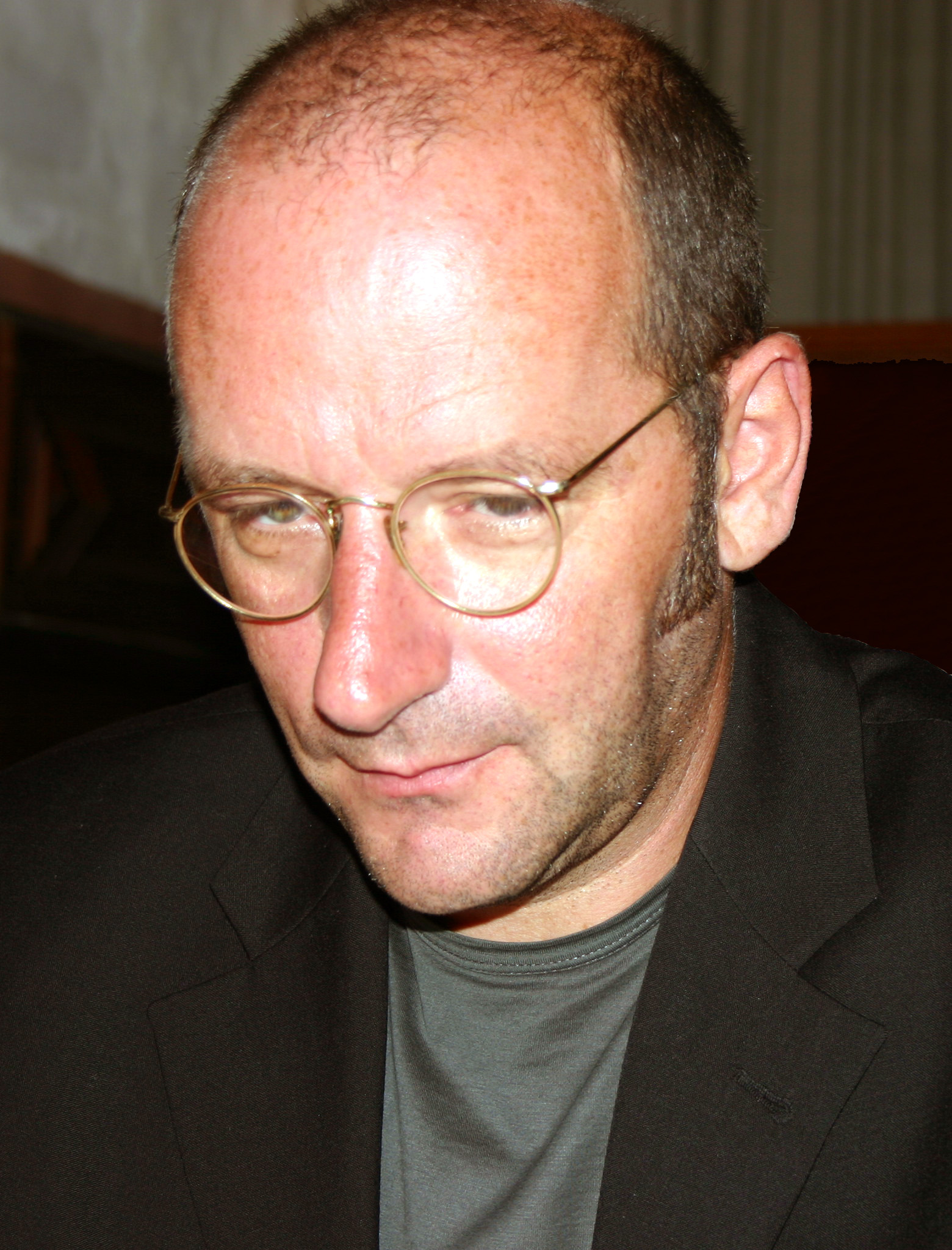
Schneider reading from Kristus in Büdingen, 2004

- Schlafes Bruder. Reclam, Leipzig 1992, ISBN 3-379-01518-0.
- Die Luftgängerin. Blessing, Munich 1998, ISBN 3-442-72578-X.
- Die Unberührten. Albrecht Knaus Verlag, München 2000, ISBN 3-8135-0161-2.
- Der Papst und das Mädchen. Novella. Reclam, Leipzig 2001, ISBN 3-379-00781-1.
- Schatten. Reclam, Leipzig 2002, ISBN 3-379-00792-7.
- Kristus. Aufbau-Verlag, Berlin 2004, ISBN 3-351-03013-4.
- Die Offenbarung. Aufbau-Verlag, Berlin 2007, ISBN 978-3-351-03212-8.

=== Drama ===
- Der falsche Prinz, comedy after the fairy-tale by Wilhelm Hauff, 1983
- Hitler mein. Eine Liebesrede, premiere: 1989, Götzis, Alte Krone
- Dreck. Monolog über die Angst vor dem Fremden, premiere: 1993, Thalia Theater (Hamburg)
- Traum und Trauer des jungen H., premiere: 1993, Schauspiel Hannover
- Alte Tage, comedy, premiere: 1994, Götzis, Am Bach
- Komödie vom deutschen Heimweh, premiere: 1999, Schauspielhaus Zürich

=== Poetry ===
- Gegengebet. 1992, Bibliothek der Provinz, Weitra 1995.
- acht preisungen. 2005, Mitteldeutscher Verlag, Halle (Saale) 2006.
