= Dana Vávrová =

Czech-German actress (born 1967)

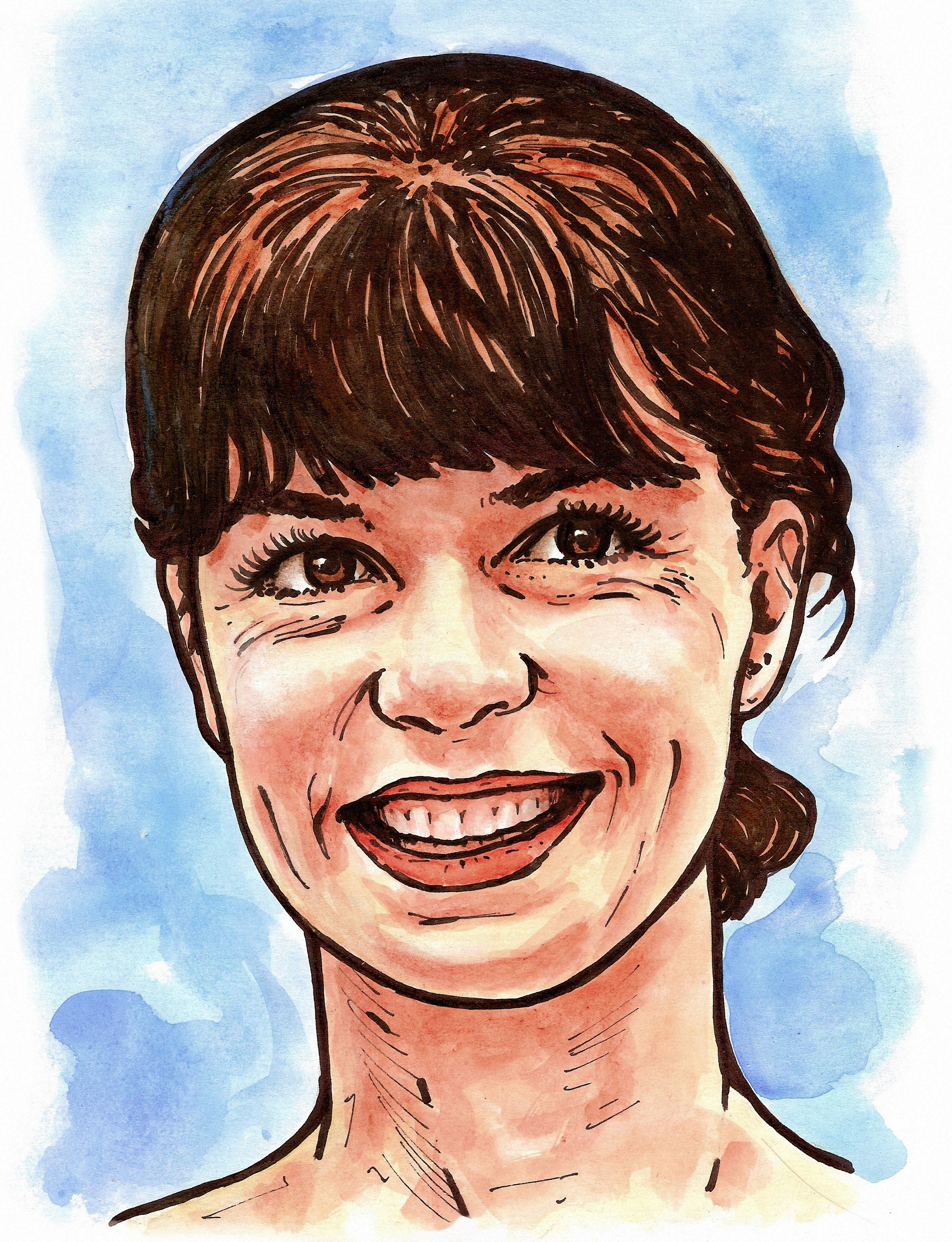
- Born: 9 August 1967; Prague, Czechoslovakia
- Died: 5 February 2009 (aged 41); Munich, Germany
- Occupations: Actress, film director
- Years active: 1976–2008
- Spouse: Joseph Vilsmaier (m. 1986)
- Children: Josefina Vilsmaier, Janina Vilsmaier, Theresa Vilsmaier
- Relatives: Hana Heřmánková (sister)

Dana Vávrová (German: [ˈdaː.na ˈva.vʁɔ.va]; 9 August 1967 – 5 February 2009) was a Czech-German actress. She was one of the most popular German actresses throughout 1980s and early 1990s. After her role in Herbstmilch as Anna Wimschneider in 1989, she became a household name in Cinema of Germany.

== Biography ==
Vávrová was born in Prague, Czechoslovakia and played her first main film role in Ať žijí duchové! (English: Long Live the Ghosts!) in 1976, having played a minor role in Jak se točí Rozmarýny. In 1979 she played a minor role in the television mini-series Arabela. In 1982, she played the main role as Janina David in the German television mini-series Ein Stück Himmel, and was awarded the Goldene Kamera, the Goldener Gong, and an Adolf Grimme Award. In this mini-series, Joseph Vilsmaier was one of the cinematographers. In parallel with her acting, she attended the Prague Conservatory from 1981 to 1985. After some further roles including the films Amadeus and Pan Tau, she played the main role of Anna Wimschneider in Herbstmilch (English: Autumn Milk) under the directorship of Joseph Vilsmaier, whom she had married in 1986. Together with Werner Stocker, she won the Bayerischer Filmpreis and the Deutscher Filmpreis for this role.

In addition to acting, she also directed films, the last one being to complete the Artur Brauner production The Last Train, (German: Der letzte Zug) after Joseph Vilsmaier, who had been directing, was involved in an accident.

Vávrová was awarded a Bundesverdienstkreuz.

The three daughters of Vávrová and Vilsmaier, Janina Vilsmaier, Theresa Vilsmaier and Josefina Vilsmaier, are also active as actresses. Vávrová's older sister, Hana Heřmánková, is a television presenter in the Czech Republic.

Dana Vávrová died of cervical cancer in Munich, Germany on 5 February 2009. She was 41 years old.

== Filmography ==
=== Actress ===
- 1977: Long Live Ghosts! (Director: Oldřich Lipský) - Leontýnka Brtník z Brtníku
- 1977: Jak se točí Rozmarýny (Director: Věra Plivová-Simková) - Zuzana
- 1979: Vražedné pochybnosti (Director: Ivo Toman) - Jana
- 1979: Kulový blesk (Director: Zdeněk Podskalský, Ladislav Smoljak)
- 1980: Koncert na konci léta (Director: František Vláčil)
- 1980: Brontosaurus (Director: Věra Plivová-Simková)
- 1980: Arabela (Director: Václav Vorlíček) - Little Red Riding Hood
- 1980: Svítalo celou noc
- 1982: Ein Stück Himmel (TV Mini Series, Director: Franz Peter Wirth)
- 1983: Kluk za dvě pětky (Director: Jaromír Borek) - Eliska
- 1984: Levé křídlo (Director: Jiří Hanibal) - Zdena
- 1984: Amadeus (Director: Miloš Forman)
- 1984: Bambinot (TV Mini Series, Director: Jaroslav Dudek)
- 1984: My všichni školou povinní (TV Mini Series, Director: Ludvík Ráža)
- 1988: Derrick (TV Series) - Bettina Rudolf
- 1988: Pan Tau (Director: Jindřich Polák) - Alena
- 1989: Autumn Milk (Director: Joseph Vilsmaier) - Anna Wimschneider
- 1991: Rama dama (Director: Joseph Vilsmaier)
- 1992: Der Nachbar (Director: Götz Spielmann) - Michaela
- 1993: Stalingrad (Director: Joseph Vilsmaier) - Irina
- 1993: Rosenemil (Director: Radu Gabrea) - Lissy
- 1995: Pizza Arrabiata (Director: Jochen Richter) - Laura
- 1995: Brother of Sleep (Director: Joseph Vilsmaier) - Elsbeth
- 1997: Comedian Harmonists (Director: Joseph Vilsmaier) - Ursula Bootz
- 2000: The Conception of My Younger Brother - Marie
- 2000: Bear on the Run (Director: Dana Vávrová) - Briefträgerin
- 2002: The Damned - Michaela Holubová
- 2002: August der Glückliche (TV Movie, Director: Joseph Vilsmaier)
- 2003: Getting a Life (TV Movie, Director: Vivian Naefe) - Tatjana Berkhoff
- 2004: Der Vater meines Sohnes (TV Movie, Director: Dagmar Damek) - Stella Fröhlich
- 2004: Rock Crystal (Director: Joseph Vilsmaier) - Susanne
- 2004: Grenzverkehr (Director: Stefan Betz) - Helena
- 2006: Ein Hauptgewinn für Papa (TV Movie, Director: Bodo Fürneisen) - Anja Lohse
- 2007: Lamento (Director: René Sydow, Daniel Hedfeld) - Christiane Reitz
- 2008: Ship of No Return: The Final Voyage of the Gustloff (TV Movie, Director: Joseph Vilsmaier) - Lilli Simoneit (final film role)

=== Director ===
- 1995: Wia die Zeit vergeht (documentary film about the musician Hubert von Goisern)
- 1996: Hunger – Sehnsucht nach Liebe
- 2000: Bear on the Run
- 2006: Der letzte Zug (directed by Dana Vávrová and Joseph Vilsmaier)
