= Hubert von Goisern =

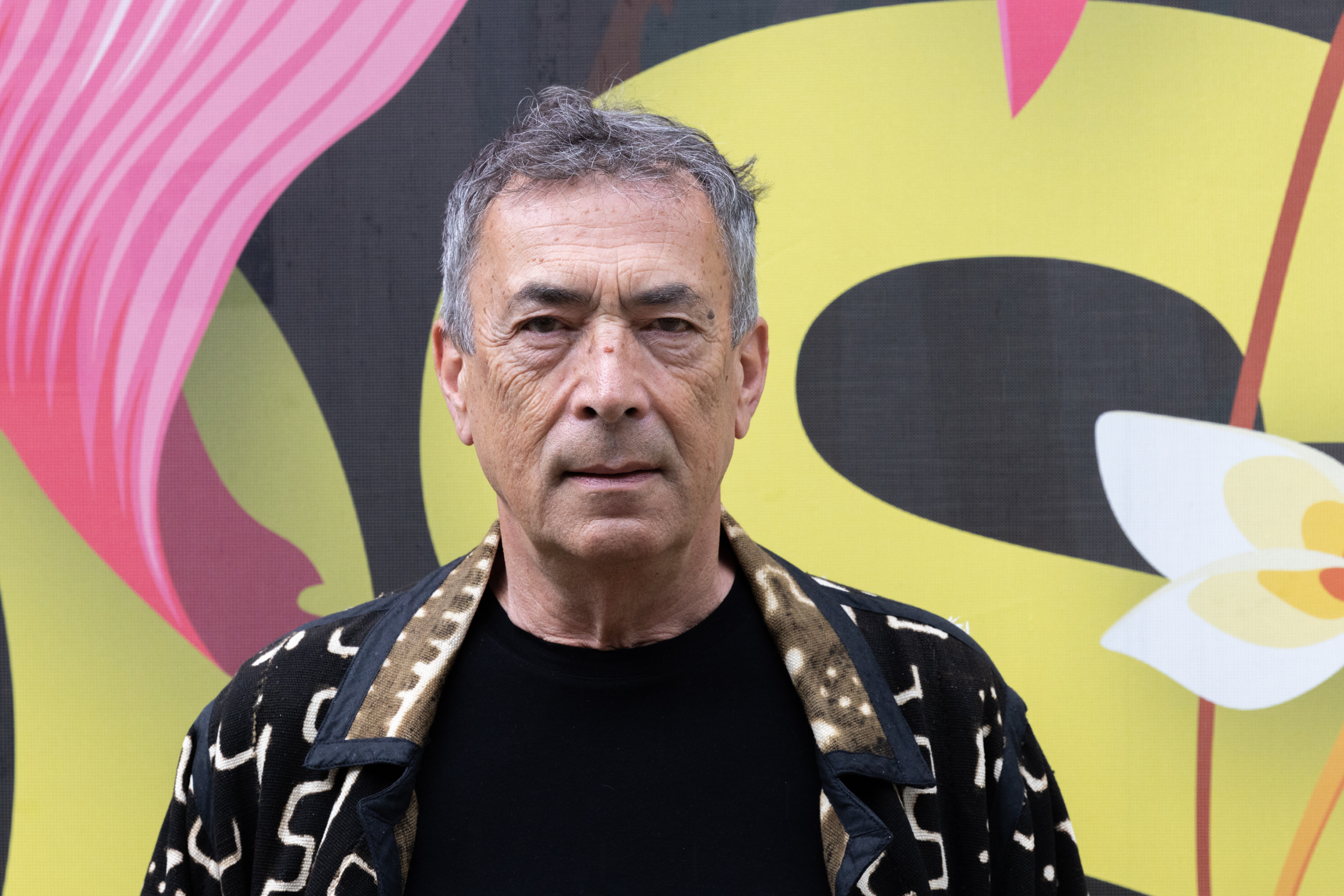
- Hubert von Goisern in 2023

Background information
- Born: Hubert Achleitner; 17 November 1952 (age 73); Bad Goisern, Austria
- Genres: Folk; folk rock; world; folk punk
- Instruments: Vocals, trumpet, guitar, clarinet, Steirische Harmonika
- Years active: 1979–present
- Labels: CBS, BMG, Ariola, Blanko Musik
- Website: www.hubertvongoisern.com

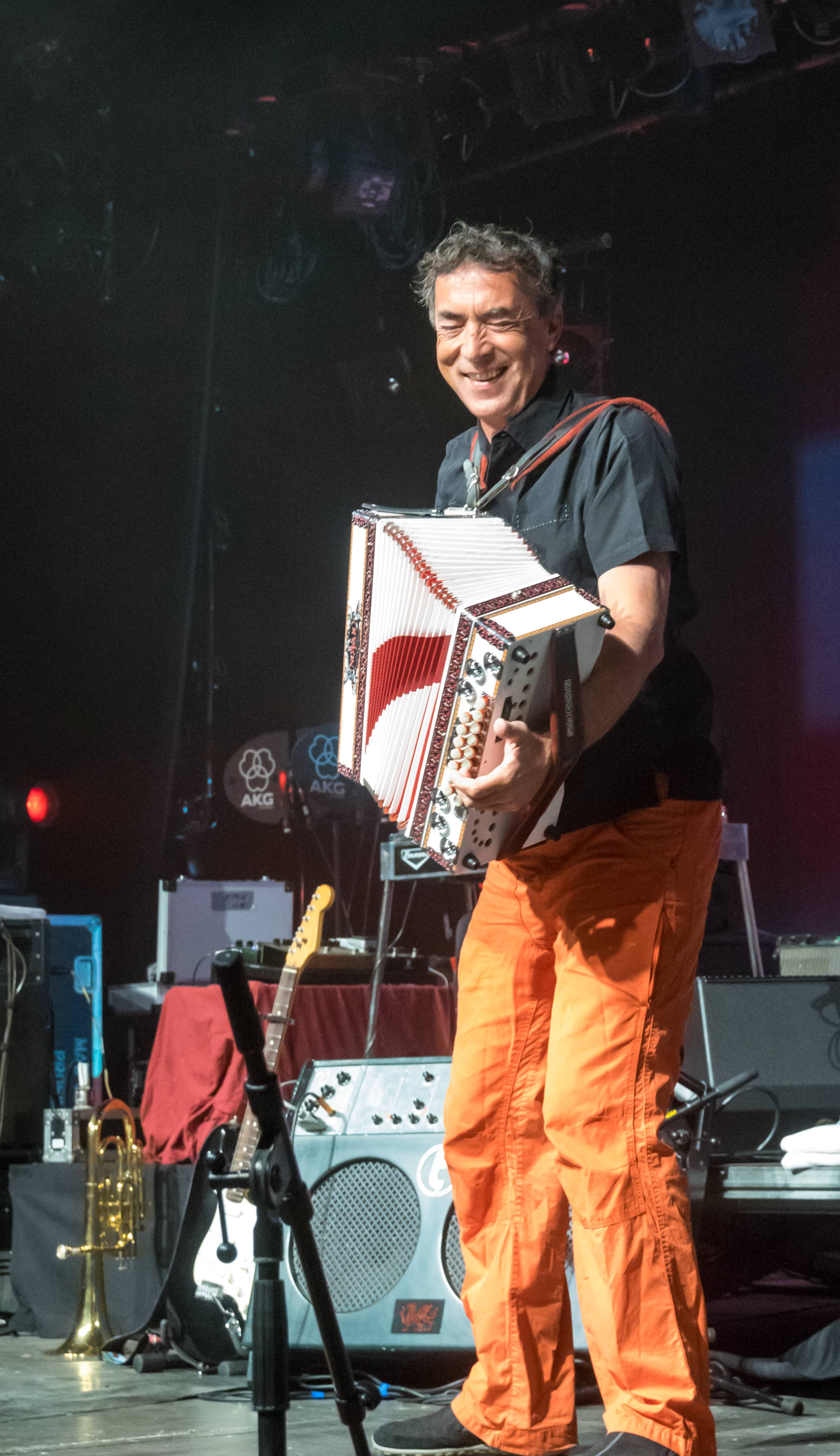
Hubert von Goisern (2015)

Hubert von Goisern (born Hubert Achleitner, 17 November 1952) is an Austrian singer-songwriter and world musician. With his mix of rock music and elements of traditional Volksmusik he has become a prominent exponent of the so-called New Volksmusik and Alpine Rock in Austria, Switzerland and Germany. His stage name von Goisern refers to his hometown. Hubert von Goisern has won numerous record certifications and several national and international awards.

== Biography ==
He was born in Bad Goisern. Already interested in music as a youth, he joined the local brass band where he learned playing the trumpet as his first instrument. When conflicts arose with the band leader about the band's repertoire and Hubert's long hair, he had to leave the band and return the trumpet. He then learned to play guitar starting with an acoustic guitar and then expanding his skills to a self-purchased electric guitar. He also took lessons in trumpet and clarinet. Other instruments like the Steirische Harmonika that was introduced to him by his grandfather were learned in private study.

=== South Africa, Canada, Philippines (1972–1983) ===
Aged 20, he left Austria with his girlfriend and relocated to South Africa where he worked in a chemical laboratory. He became involved in the struggle against apartheid but returned to Austria five years later. There he married his Canadian wife and adopted her surname Sullivan.

At the age of 27 he decided to become a professional musician. He studied guitar in Toronto for two years and learned to play flamenco music. After separating from his wife, he went on another journey and learned to play the nose flute on the Philippines. This was also where he began to develop his own musical style by incorporating elements of a foreign traditional music into the traditional music of his home country Austria.

=== Austria: the Alpinkatzen (1984–1995) ===
Back in Austria in 1984, he worked as a freelance musician and composer and studied electroacoustics and experimental music at the University of Music and Performing Arts, Vienna. In 1986 he and Wolfgang Staribacher founded the band Original Alpinkatzen. At this time he also adopted his stage name Hubert von Goisern while Staribacher was Wolfgang von Wien. Beginning with small performances in clubs and pubs, they published a studio album Alpine Lawine [Alpine Avalanche] in 1988 on CBS using the moniker "Alpinkatzen featuring Hubert von Goisern".

Together with Wolfgang Ambros, Joesi Prokopetz and Manfred Tauchen the Alpinkatzen performed the Watzmann tour, a stage adaption of the audio drama Der Watzmann ruft [Mount Watzmann is calling]. Afterwards the band parted with Wolfgang Staribacher. Hubert von Goisern kept his stage name and continued the project with a number of new musicians: Stefan Engel (keys), Wolfgang Maier (drums), Reinhard Stranzinger (guitar) and Sabine Kapfinger (vocals). Kapfinger became later known as "Alpine Sabine" and eventually "Zabine". At first she participated in studio recordings only, but taught von Goisern how to yodel.

The band had a breakthrough in 1992 with their album Aufgeigen stått niederschiassen [Striking up instead of shooting down] that featured the tracks "Heast as nit" (Austrian German for "don't you hear it"), "Weit, weit weg" [far, far away], and "Koa Hiatamadl" (dialectal for "no herder girl"). "Koa Hiatamadl" received extended airplay and peaked at No. 2 in the Austrian singles charts. The Alpinkatzen toured across German language countries and became one of the most successful Alpenrock bands.

In 1994, the second album Omunduntn (dialectal for "Up and down") was released. It contains the track "Goisern" which is a German language adaption of Ray Charles' song "Georgia", and also reworked versions of the songs "Cocaine" and "Kren & Speck" [horse radish and bacon] from the Alpinkatzen's first album Alpine Lawine. A new tour was conducted through Austria, Switzerland and Germany. Another quick tour included performances in Paris, San Antonio and Austin, Texas, and New York City. It was the last concert tour by the Alpinkatzen. Their last concert was given on 1 November 1994. Shortly before, a performance at the Circus Krone Building had been filmed by director Joseph Vilsmaier and his wife Dana Vávrová. The documentary Wia die Zeit vergeht [how time passes by] was presented at the 1995 Munich Festival and was later published on VHS and DVD. The concert at Circus Krone was declared the farewell performance by the band.

=== Fashion and film ===
Apart from his musical activities, von Goisern had created two fashion lines together with his friend Klaus Höller, which were produced by Modehaus Meindl. Like his music, these collections were meant to interpret traditional elements in a modern way.

Von Goisern made his debut as an actor in the 1995 television drama Hölleisengretl by director Jo Baier. He played the husband of protagonist Gretl (Martina Gedeck), and wrote the film score together with Austrian singer-songwriter Stefan Melbinger. Due to the Omunduntn tour he was unable to accept another acting offer for the role of Elias in Vilsmaier's film Brother of Sleep (German title: Schlafes Bruder), but he wrote the film score together with Winfried Grabe and Enjott Schneider. Other film music by Hubert von Goisern includes the scores for two films by Austrian actor and director Julian Pölsler in 1991, and a television film Die Fernsehsaga – Eine steirische Fernsehgeschichte [the TV saga – a Styrian television tale] (1995).

The soundtrack for the children's television film Ein Rucksack voller Lügen [A backpack full of lies] was published in 1996 as Ein Sack voller Lügen [A bag full of lies].

=== Africa and Tibet (1997–1998) ===
Hubert von Goisern had been introduced to anthropologist Jane Goodall by their common friend, publisher Michael Neugebauer. Intrigued by her work and eventually invited by her for a visit to Gombe Stream National Park, von Goisern travelled to Tanzania in 1996 for the first time. During another voyage, a documentary film was made in cooperation with the Austrian ORF and German Bayerischer Rundfunk broadcasters: Von Goisern nach Gombe [From Goisern to Gombe]. The soundtrack Gombe was published on CD in 1998.

Tseten Zöchbauer, chairwoman of the Austrian organisation Save Tibet introduced von Goisern to artists of the India-based Tibetan Institute of Performing Arts (TIPA). Subsequently, he accompanied and presented their Austrian tour. Afterwards he planned a voyage to Tibet and invited Zöchbauer, who had left her native country aged two, to come along. For six weeks they travelled through Tibet and later, in an ORF interview, reported on the status of the Tibetan people, culture, and relationship with their Chinese national government.

Together with Wolfgang Spannberger he later travelled to Dharamshala, Himachal Pradesh, India, where the Central Tibetan Administration is located. There they met Tenzin Gyatso, the 14th Dalai Lama. With a mobile sound studio they recorded traditional Tibetan music performed by artists of TIPA. These recordings and other songs from a recording session with Tibetan guest musicians in Salzburg, Austria, were released in 1998 on the album Inexile [in exile]. The Dalai Lama followed an invitation by Hubert von Goisern and visited him in Bad Ischl in 1998.

=== Restart (1999–2006) ===
In 1999, Hubert von Goisern worked again on recordings for an album of his own. The tracks for Fön [Foehn wind] were recorded with a new band in the summer of 2000. The album was released the same year. In early 2001, the band went on a promotional tour starting in Linz, and Trad, a compilation of Austrian folk songs, was released.

In May 2001, Hubert von Goisern received his first Amadeus Austrian Music Award as best national rock/pop artist. In his acceptance speech, which turned out to have been edited by ORF prior to airing, he criticised the Austrian music industry for a lack in supporting Austrian artists.

Following the Fön tour, Hubert von Goisern played a number of concerts in Egypt and West African countries. In Assiut he shared the stage with Mohamed Mounir, one of the best-known Egyptian musicians, who fuses elements of traditional Sufi music and modern rock. During his tour through West Africa, von Goisern was accompanied by a film team that recorded a documentary Grenzenlos [Without Borders] about connecting the meetings of the Austrian musicians with various African artists. In the summer of 2002, a concert tour was made in Germany, and the album Iwasig [Above] was released.

The same year, when the Dalai Lama performed a kalachakra ceremony in Graz, Austria, Hubert von Goisern and Tseten Zöchbauer presented several Sounds of Tibet concerts with TIPA artists.

After an indoors concert tour through Austria, Germany, Switzerland and Italy, the band recorded the album Trad II in a studio that had been custom-built in an abandoned hotel on Mount Krippenstein in the Dachstein Mountains. The subsequent concerts included locations in Sarajevo and Cape Verde. In 2003, von Goisern toured with Mohamed Mounir through Germany, Austria and Switzerland. After presenting Trad II on Mount Krippenstein in October 2003, von Goisern went on the Trad II tour in 2004.

In January 2005, Hubert von Goisern and his band performed at the Festival au Désert in Mali together with balafon player Kele Tigi. Again, this trip was recorded on film and was later shown as Warten auf Timbuktu (Waiting for Timbuktu).

After the numerous tours of the past years, von Goisern turned to different activities. Examples include the presentation of a sound installation in a cave of the Dachstein mountains. In November 2005 he recorded the duet Rita mir zwei with Wolfgang Niedecken which was released on the anniversary album of the German band BAP: Dreimal zehn Jahre [Three times ten years].

In April 2006, the Freedom Party of Austria used von Goisern's song "Heast as nit" [Don't you hear it?] in an election campaign. Hubert von Goisern then published an open letter to party leader Heinz-Christian Strache, demanding that the Freedom Party stopped using his songs. The letter included a statement: "I stand for an open, tolerant society, for the destruction of fear of the unknown and new, and not for the fomentation thereof. I stand for looking changes in the eye and looking forward, not for the attempt to stop time, or to even turn it back; that is the content of 'Heast as nit...'."

=== Linz Europe Tour 2007–2009 ===
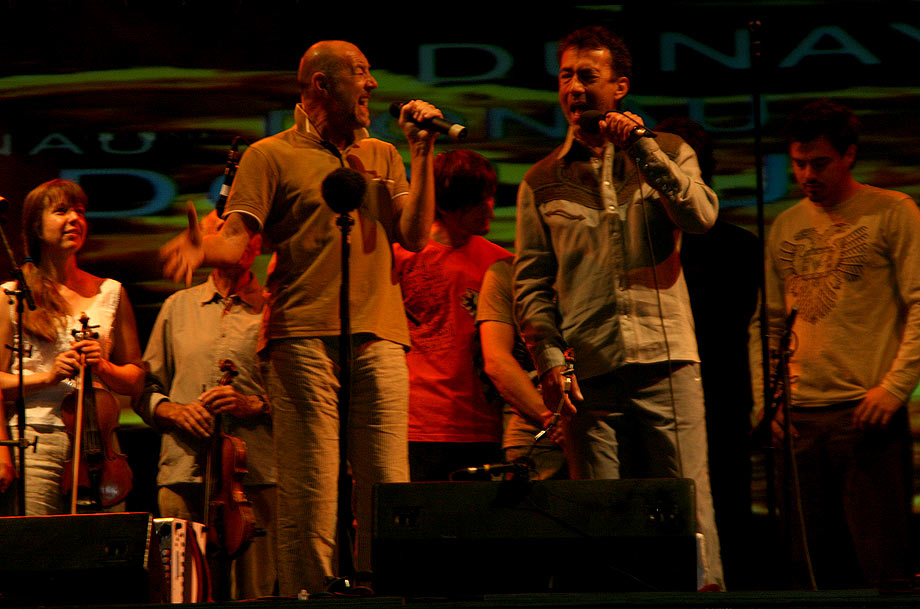
Willi Resetarits (left), Hubert von Goisern (right) and band members of Hohtraxlecker Sprungschanzenmusi at the 2007 Donauinselfest

In 2007, von Goisern started the Linz Europe Tour 2007–2009 which was a promotional tour for Linz as European Capital of Culture 2009. The planning had already begun in 2005. Until 2009, he navigated several European rivers with a convoy of three ships, including a cargo ship converted to a floating stage, a towboat MS Wallsee, and a houseboat. This included concerts with local musicians in numerous towns along the route. Performances were made at the 2007 Donauinselfest in Vienna (featuring Willi Resetarits), The first part of the tour lead down the river Danube to its delta at the Black Sea. In 2008, a documentary DVD of this tour was released: Goisern goes East.

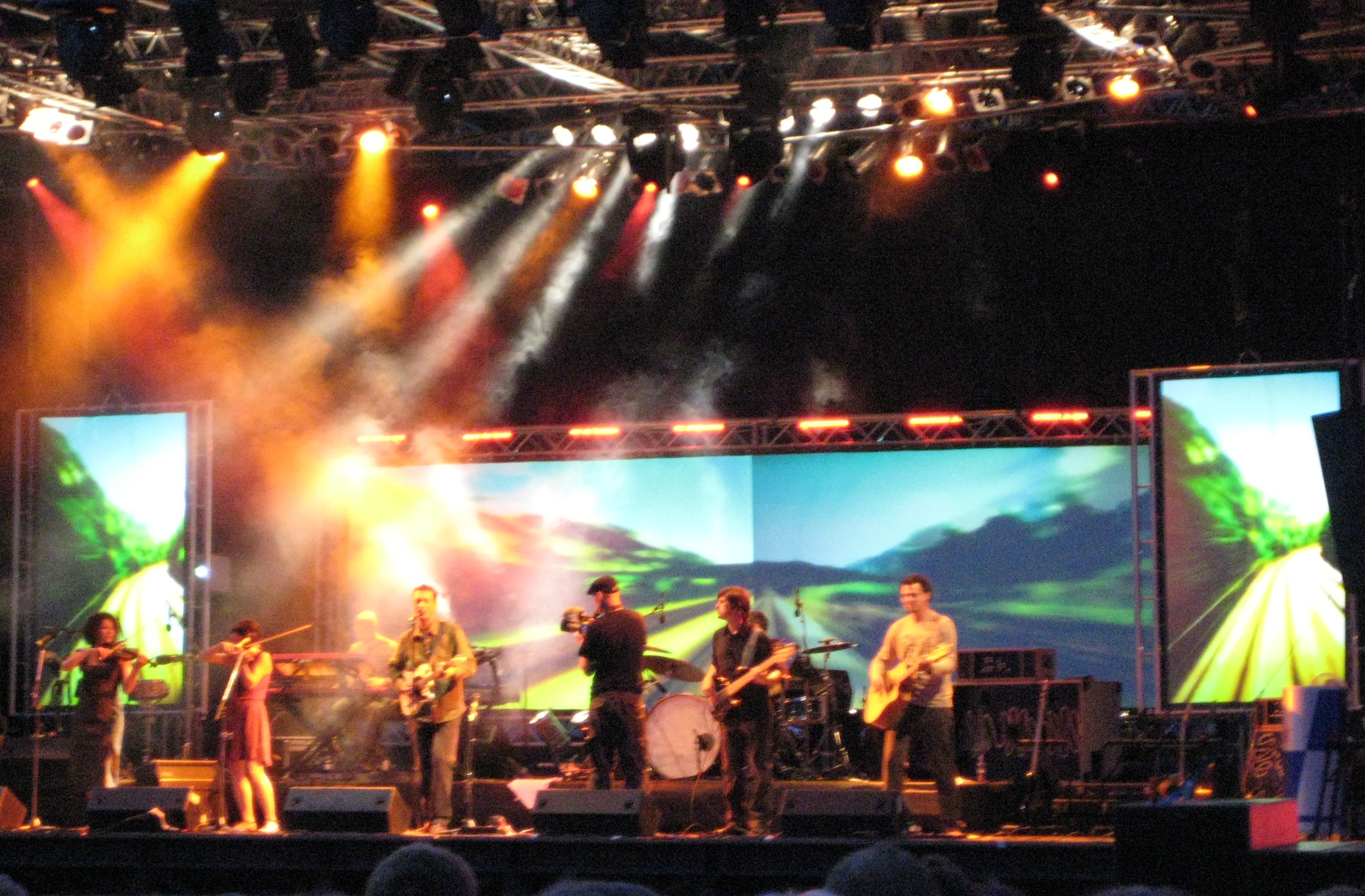
Hubert von Goisern performing in Passau, Germany, in June 2007

In 2008, the second leg of the tour went upstream the Danube via Passau and Regensburg, through the Rhine–Main–Danube Canal, and downstream the Rhine to Rotterdam in the Netherlands. Simultaneously the album s'Nix [The Void] was released. The river tour ended with a three-day-long celebration in Linz, the ships' homeport. Participating musicians included Klaus Doldinger, BAP, Haindling, Konstantin Wecker and Xavier Naidoo.

Von Goisern wrote a logbook Stromlinien [Streamlines] about this tour. It was published in 2010.

=== Entwederundoder ===
From late 2010 to spring 2011, Hubert von Goisern toured pubs and inns in Austria and Germany. Live recordings and a documentary were broadcast by the Salzburg-based station Servus TV in August 2011. Soon after, the album Entwederundoder [Either and or] was released that reached the top 20 charts in Austria and Germany. Hitradio Ö3 put the track "Brenna tuat's guat" [It burns well] on the playlist. The single reached position No. 1 in the Austrian within a few weeks, outperforming the previous success "Koa Hiatamadl". "Brenna tuat's guat" got a platinum certification in Austria in 2012 and was also a success in Germany where it was von Goisern's first single in the charts. The album was awarded three platinum certifications in Austria and gold in Germany.

== Music ==
=== Style ===
Hubert von Goisern is counted among the exponents of the so-called "Neue Volksmusik", lit. "New Folk Music". He is however more often associated with "Alpenrock" or "Alpine rock". His music fuses modern rock and traditional Alpine music. His style is significant for stressing the sound of the harmonica which is then balanced by electric guitars.

Other influences include traditional African music as recorded on Gombe as well as Brazilian samba and also funk. The latter genres have helped von Goisern develop from Alpine music towards world music.

=== Lyrics ===
The lyrics of Hubert von Goisern's songs are often political and critical of society. An example are the references to far right politician Jörg Haider who hailed also from Goisern, and whose Freedom Party enjoyed high polls during the late 20th century and early 2000s.

== Discography ==
=== Albums ===
==== Alpinkatzen feat. Hubert von Goisern ====
- 1988: Alpine Lawine [Alpine avalanche]

==== Hubert von Goisern und die Alpinkatzen ====
Year	Title	Type	Peak positions			Certifications
Year	Title	Type	AUT	GER	SWI	Certifications
1992	Aufgeigen stått niederschiassen [Striking up instead of shooting down]	studio album	1	47	25	AUT: 1 × Gold, 6 × Platinum GER: 1 × Gold
1994	Omunduntn [Up and down]	studio album	1	25	18	AUT: 1 × Platinum GER: 1 × Gold
1995	Wia die Zeit vergeht… [How time goes by]	live album (2 CDs)	4	27	27	AUT: 1 × Gold
2006	Wia die Zeit vergeht…	live album (DVD)	—	—	—	GER: music video award

==== Hubert von Goisern ====
Studio albums

Year	Title	Peak positions		Certifications
Year	Title	AUT	GER	Certifications
1998	Inexil [In exile]	15	—	
2000	Fön [Foehn wind]	4	33	AUT: 1 × Gold
2002	Iwasig [Above]	5	52	AUT: 1 × Gold
2008	S'Nix [The Void]	2	40	
2011	EntwederUndOder [Either and or]	2	13	AUT: 3 × Platinum GER: 1 × Gold
2015	Federn	2	6	

Live albums

Year	Title	Peak positions	
Year	Title	AUT	GER
2005	Ausland [Overseas]	30	—
2005	Haut und Haar (double album) [fig.: Neck and crop]	24	—
2017	Federn Live 2014–2016	40	—

Compilations

Year	Title	Peak positions		Certifications
Year	Title	AUT	GER	Certifications
2000	Eswaramoi 1992–1998 [Once upon a time 1992–1998]	19	—	AUT: 1 × Gold
2001	Trad	6	52	
2002	Trad II	10	73	
2006	Derweil 1988–2006 [Meanwhile, 1988–2006]	17	68	AUT: 1 × Gold

Soundtracks

Year	Title	Peak positions	
Year	Title	AUT	GER
1995	Schlafes Bruder	23	—
1996	Ein Sack voller Lügen [A bag full of lies]	—	—
1998	Gombe	14	74

DVD

- 2003: Iwasig [Above] (live)
- 2003: Grenzenlos [Without borders]
- 2005: Ausland [Overseas] (live)
- 2008: Goisern goes East

== Bibliography ==
- Hubert von Goisern (2010). Stromlinien [Streamlines] (in German). St. Pölten: Residenz Verlag. ISBN 978-3-7017-3186-2.

== Awards and nominations ==
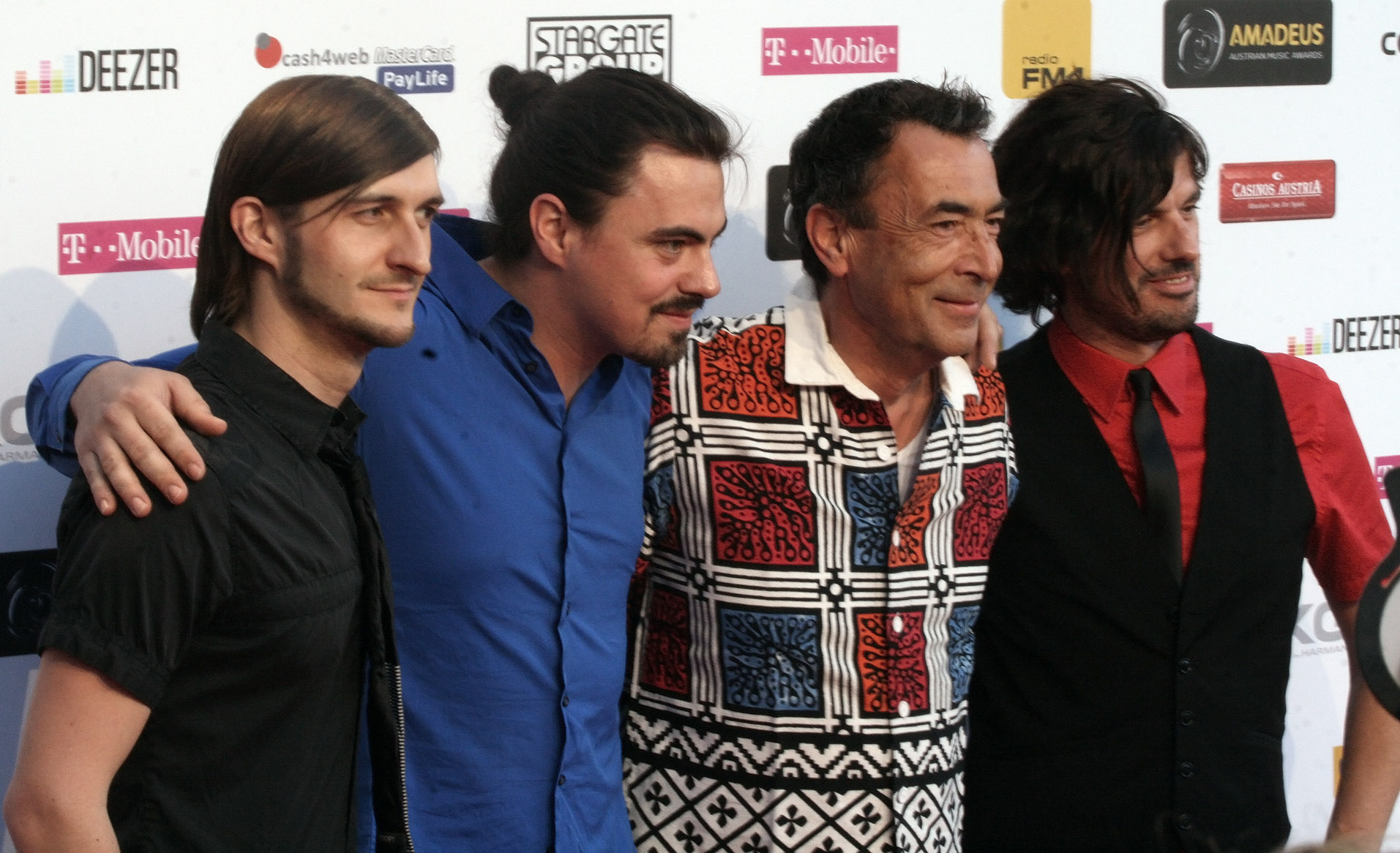
Hubert von Goisern and his band at the 2012 Amadeus Austrian Music Awards

Von Goisern has won multiple Amadeus Austrian Music Awards by IFPI Austria, and RUTH, the German World Music Prize. In 2004, he was granted an honorary citizenship by his hometown Bad Goisern.

Year	Award	Category	Work	Result
2001	Amadeus Austrian Music Award	National Rock/Pop Artist	Fön	Won
2002	Amadeus Austrian Music Award	National Jazz/Blues/Folk Album of the Year	Trad	Won
2003	Amadeus Austrian Music Award	National Rock/Pop Artist	Iwasig	Nominated
2005	Amadeus Austrian Music Award	National Jazz/Blues/Folk Album of the Year	Trad II	Nominated
2006	Amadeus Austrian Music Award	National Jazz/Blues/Folk Album of the Year	Ausland	Nominated
2011	Deutsche RUTH (German World Music Prize)	Artists rooted in German traditional music	Mit Haut und Haar	Won
2012	Amadeus Austrian Music Award	Album of the year	EntwederUndOder	Won
2012	Amadeus Austrian Music Award	National Rock/Pop Artist	EntwederUndOder	Won
2013	Amadeus Austrian Music Award	Honorary award for genre-crossing, unifying music		Won
2016	Amadeus Austrian Music Award	Artist of the year	Federn	Won
