= The Dirty Dozen: The Deadly Mission =

1987 American made-for-TV movie

- Official DVD cover
- Genre: Action; War
- Written by: Mark Rodgers
- Directed by: Lee H. Katzin
- Starring: Telly Savalas; Ernest Borgnine; Vince Edwards; Bo Svenson; Wolf Kahler; Vincent Van Patten; Randall "Tex" Cobb
- Music by: John Cacavas
- Country of origin: United States
- Original language: English

Production
- Executive producer: David Gerber
- Producer: Mel Swope
- Production locations: Kostanjevica na Krki, Slovenia; Zagreb, Croatia; Brezice, Slovenia
- Cinematography: Tomislav Pinter
- Editors: Ronald J. Fagan; Ronald LaVine; Richard E. Rabjohn
- Running time: 94 minutes
- Production companies: MGM/UA Television; Jadran Film

Original release
- Network: NBC
- Release: March 1, 1987

The Dirty Dozen: The Deadly Mission is a 1987 made-for-TV film and is the second sequel to the original The Dirty Dozen. It features an all-new 'dirty dozen,' this time under the leadership of Major Wright (Telly Savalas, playing a different role than in the 1967 film).

Learning of a Nazi plot to attack Washington, D.C., with a deadly nerve gas, Major Wright leads twelve convicts on a suicide mission deep into occupied France to destroy the secret factory where the poison is made.

== Plot ==
Major Wright is informed by Major General Worden that the Germans have the capability to launch V-2 rockets filled with nerve gas against the Allies. Wright is ordered to recruit convicts and parachute them into France near the monastery at Saint-Michel, deep behind enemy lines, to destroy the nerve gas and rescue enslaved scientists. Wright selects twelve convicts for his Deadly Dozen: Joe Stern, Eric "Swede" Wallan, Ernesto "Pops" Ferucci, brothers Ronald and David Webber, Maurice Fontenac, Martinez, Francis Kelly, Ballews, Sturdivant, Chacon, Spencer and Hallet. They receive one week of training under Wright and Sergeant Holt.

In France, Colonel Krieger captures Resistance leader Paul Verlaine and his British contact, who has parachuted in with news of the Deadly Dozen's mission. Krieger executes them and Pierre Claudel, a scientist at the monastery loyal to Vichy and the Nazis, reports Verlaine had conversed with lead scientist George Flamands. Krieger orders increased security at the monastery. General Worden reveals the intelligence leak and increased security to Wright, and informs him that the dozen will enter France by sea, as air flights to France are heavily monitored.

The Dozen come ashore and meet their contact, Marie Verlaine, the daughter of Paul Verlaine, with her fellow resistance fighters. Marie informs Wright that the scientists' families have been brought to the monastery, complicating their rescue. To avoid Krieger's security, Wright decides to travel by river, and Sturdivant is killed when the unit takes control of a patrol boat. They arrive at a resistance safe house and rest while Major Wright and Fontenac infiltrate the monastery dressed as monks to inform Flamands of their plan.

Wright and Fontenac re-enter the monastery to trigger the attack, while the others infiltrate the compound. During the ensuing firefight, Wright destroys the communications center, Stern infiltrates the basement and Fontenac opens the back door allowing Marie, Swede, Martinez and the resistance in with the explosives. Ferucci is wounded while Chacon and Spencer are killed. The group discovers the scientists' families and Fredric Flamands, George Flamands' son, learning that Flamands and his wife Julia have been taken to a recital at a villa as guests of a German general. Wright evacuates all of them and goes with Stern to the villa to rescue the Flamands. The rescued scientists and families travel by truck to rendezvous with a British plane, and Wright sends two additional trucks driven by Martinez, Ballews, and the Webber brothers as decoys.

Major Wright and Stern, posing as German officers, enter the villa and remove Flamands and head to the rendezvous point. German patrols destroy the decoy trucks, and both the Webber Brothers, Martinez and Ballews are killed. Realizing they've been tricked, Krieger races his men to the plane and fire at it as the scientists and families embark. Fontenac carries the panicked Fredric to safety but a mortar shell wounds Fontenac and knocks Fredric out. Wallan manages to save Fredric and Kelly. Fontenac sacrifices himself by drawing fire from approaching patrols, giving the plane time to load and take-off for England.

Major Wright and Sergeant Holt survive, and surviving convicts Joe Stern, Eric 'Swede' Wallan, Ernesto 'Pops' Ferucci, and Francis Kelly receive pardons.

== Cast ==
- Telly Savalas as Major Wright
- Ernest Borgnine as Major General Sam Worden
- Vince Edwards as Sergeant Holt
- Bo Svenson as Maurice Fontenac
- Vincent Van Patten as Ronald Webber
- James Van Patten as David Webber
- Randall "Tex" Cobb as Eric "Swede" Wallan
- Gary Graham as Joseph Stern
- Wolf Kahler as Colonel Krieger
- Thom Mathews as Francis Kelly
- Emmanuelle Meyssignac as Marie Verlaine
- Paul Picerni as Ernesto "Pops" Ferucci
- Branko Blaće as Martinez
- Bernard Woringer as Georges Flamands
- David Horovitch as Pierre Claudel
- Pavle Balenović as Ballews
- Matko Raguž as Sturdivant
- Mario Barbarić as Chacon
- Milan Ristić as Spencer
- Sam Douglas as Hallet
- Werner Stocker as SS Sergeant
- Vili Matula as Krieger's Aide
- Ivo Krištof as Lieutenant Karl Hoffler
- Božidar Smiljanić as Paul Verlaine
- Meg Wynn Owen as Julia Flamands
- Jay Bura as Fredric Flamands, Georges's Son
