= Brother of Sleep =

1995 German film

Schlafes Bruder
- Film poster
- German: Schlafes Bruder
- Directed by: Joseph Vilsmaier
- Written by: Robert Schneider
- Produced by: Danny Krausz; Peter Sterr
- Starring: André Eisermann; Dana Vávrová; Ben Becker; Jochen Nickel
- Cinematography: Joseph Vilsmaier
- Edited by: Alexander Berner
- Music by: Enjott Schneider; Hubert von Goisern; Harald Feller
- Distributed by: Senator
- Release date: 8 September 1995 (TIFF)
- Running time: 127 minutes
- Country: Germany
- Language: German
- Box office: $6 million (Germany)

Brother of Sleep (German: Schlafes Bruder) is a 1995 German film directed by Joseph Vilsmaier and based on the novel Schlafes Bruder by Austrian writer Robert Schneider. It was chosen as Germany's official submission to the 68th Academy Awards for Best Foreign Language Film, but did not manage to receive a nomination.

== Cast ==
- André Eisermann as Elias
- Dana Vávrová as Elsbeth
- Ben Becker as Peter
- Jochen Nickel as Köhler Michel
- Jürgen Schornagel as Kurat Benzer
- Paulus Manker as Lehrer Oskar
- Lena Stolze as Oskarin
- Michael Mendl as Nulf
- Eva Mattes as Nulfin
- Peter Franke as Seff
- Michaela Rosen as Seffin
- Detlef Bothe as Lukas
- Angelika Bartsch as Burga
- Heinz Emigholz: Haintz

== Reception ==
It was the fourth most popular German film of the year with a gross of 9.9 million Deutsche Mark ($6 million).

== See also ==
- List of submissions to the 68th Academy Awards for Best Foreign Language Film
- List of German submissions for the Academy Award for Best Foreign Language Film
