= Böhse Onkelz (album) =

Studio album by Böhse Onkelz
- Released: 28 February 2020
- Genre: Hard rock
- Length: 55:03
- Label: Mataploz
- Producer: Böhse Onkelz; Michael Mainx

Böhse Onkelz chronology
Memento (2016)	Böhse Onkelz (2020)

Böhse Onkelz (stylized in all-lowercase on the cover) is the 17th studio album of the German hard rock band Böhse Onkelz. The album is named after the band itself and was released on 28 February 2020. It is the second studio album after their comeback in 2014 and was published by the band-owned label Matapaloz.

== Content ==
On the album, the band looks back on its 40-year-long history since its inception in 1980. The song "Kuchen und Bier" deals with this topic especially. There are songs about relationships ("Des Bruders Hüter") and social criticism ("Du hasst mich! Ich mag das!" and "Rennt!"). The "Prolog" is spoken by German actor Ben Becker.

== Reception ==
Manuel Berger of laut.de gave the album 2 of 5 points. It would only contain topics that had been covered by the band for decades and from each the band could make a best-of alone. Especially drums and guitars would sound very uninspired throughout the whole album. The songs themselves are mostly filling material, standard songs and copies of older songs, mostly without any creativity. Only the songs "Kuchen und Bier" and "Die Erinnerung tanzt in meinem Kopf" were given positive reviews.

The music magazine Metal Hammer awarded the album 6.5 of 7 points. Author Matthias Weckmann describes the songs as sharp-edged, rocking, introvert, self-ironic, dashing, demanding and gleeful. They aren't as experimental as on the predecessor but they're full of the attitude that rocked this country for the last 40 years. The song "Wie aus der Sage" is recommended highly.

== Track listing ==
1. "Prolog" (Engl. "Prologue") – 0:34
2. "Kuchen und Bier" ("Cake and beer") – 4:30
3. "Des Bruders Hüter" ("Brother's keeper") – 4:22
4. "Ein Hoch auf die Toten" ("A toast for the dead") – 4:19
5. "Prawda" ("Truth") – 4:14
6. "Saufen ist wie Weinen" ("Drinking is like crying") – 4:28
7. "Wie aus der Sage" ("Like a myth") – 5:13
8. "Du hasst mich! Ich mag das!" ("You hate me! I like that!") – 4:12
9. "Rennt!" ("Run!") – 4:46
10. "Wer schön sein will muss lachen" ("You have to laugh to be beautiful") – 5:41
11. "Der Hund den keiner will" ("The dog nobody wants") – 3:30
12. "Flügel für dich" ("Wings for you") – 4:29
13. "Die Erinnerung tanzt in meinem Kopf" ("The memory is dancing in my head") – 4:45

== Personnel ==
- Kevin Russell – vocals
- Stephan Weidner – additional vocals, bass guitar
- Matthias Röhr – guitar
- Peter Schorowsky – drums
- Michael Mainx – acoustic guitar
- Vincent Roehr – strings arrangement
- Ben Becker – spoken words

== Charts ==
=== Weekly charts ===
Chart (2020)	Peak position
Austrian Albums (Ö3 Austria)	1
German Albums (Offizielle Top 100)	1
Spanish Albums (PROMUSICAE)	95
Swiss Albums (Schweizer Hitparade)	1

=== Year-end charts ===
Chart (2020)	Peak position
Austrian Albums (Ö3 Austria)	29
German Albums (Offizielle Deutsche Charts)	2
Swiss Albums (Schweizer Hitparade)	68

== Certifications ==
Region	Certification	Certified units/sales
Germany (BVMI)	Gold	100,000^{‡}
^{‡} Sales+streaming figures based on certification alone.
