= Taking Sides (play) =

1995 play by Ronald Harwood

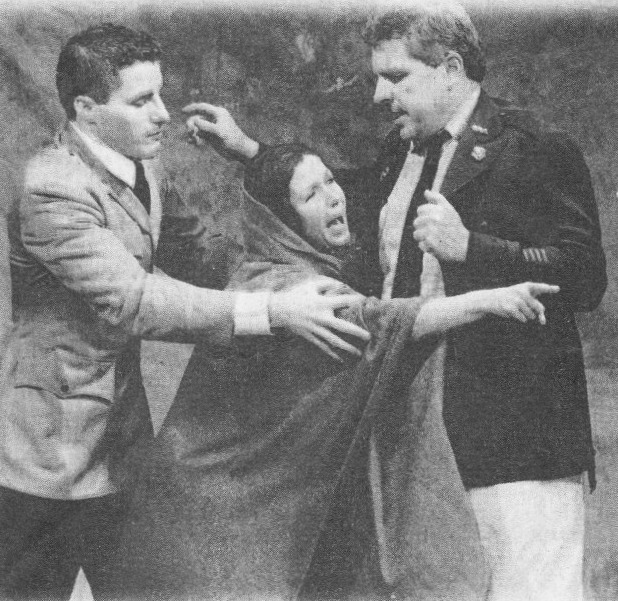
- Lenka Pichlíková (at center) as Tamara Sachs in Taking Sides (Stamford Theatre Works, Connecticut, 1999).
- Original language: English
- Written by: Ronald Harwood
- Based on: Diary of Wilhelm Furtwängler
- Characters: Wilhelm Furtwängler; Major Steve Arnold; Lieutenant David Wills; Emmi Straube; Tamara Sachs; Helmuth Rode
- Subject: Investigation of Furtwängler
- Genre: Historical drama
- Setting: 1946 post-World War II Berlin, Germany

Premiere
- Date: 15 May 1995
- Place: Minerva Theatre, Chichester
- Directed by: Harold Pinter

Taking Sides is a 1995 play by British playwright Ronald Harwood, about the post-war United States denazification investigation of the German conductor and composer Wilhelm Furtwängler on charges of having served the Nazi regime. Harwood drew among other things on a detailed diary kept by Furtwängler of his interrogation sessions. Although the investigation that is the focus of the play resulted in formal charges being brought against Furtwängler, he was eventually cleared by the tribunal.

== Original London production ==
The original West End theatre production was performed at the Criterion Theatre in Piccadilly Circus, London. It starred Daniel Massey as Wilhelm Furtwängler and Michael Pennington as Major Steve Arnold. Massey was nominated for the Laurence Olivier Award for Best Actor in 1996 for his role as Furtwängler. Harwood was also nominated for the Laurence Olivier Award for Best New Play. The cast had originally performed the play at the Minerva Theatre in Chichester, which was directed by Harold Pinter. It premiered there on 18 May 1995. The play then transferred to the West End and premiered on 3 July 1995.

== Broadway ==
When the play transferred to Broadway for a limited run in 1996, Ed Harris took over the role of Major Steve Arnold, and Daniel Massey reprised his award-winning role as Wilhelm Furtwängler. The first of 15 previews of the production commenced on 4 October 1996 and the show officially opened at the Brooks Atkinson Theatre on 17 October 1996. 85 performances of the play were shown before the production closed on 29 December 1996. For his performance in the role of Furtwängler, Massey was nominated for the Drama Desk Award for Outstanding Actor in a Play.

== Film adaptation ==
In 2001, the play was adapted into a motion picture of the same name, directed by Hungarian director István Szabó. Harwood wrote the screenplay for the film himself. Taking Sides premiered at the Toronto International Film Festival on 13 September 2001 and was released to cinemas in the US and UK, on 5 September 2003 and 21 November 2003 respectively. The film stars Harvey Keitel as Major Steve Arnold and Stellan Skarsgård as Furtwängler.
