= The Conception of My Younger Brother =

2000 film

- Directed by: Vladimír Drha
- Written by: Vladimír Drha
- Starring: Dana Vávrová
- Cinematography: Vladimir Krepelka
- Release date: 20 January 2000
- Running time: 90 minutes
- Country: Czech Republic
- Language: Czech

The Conception of My Younger Brother (Czech: Početí mého mladšího bratra) is a 2000 Czech drama film directed by Vladimír Drha. It was entered into the 22nd Moscow International Film Festival.

== Cast ==
- Dana Vávrová as Marie
- Jiří Bartoška as Josef Plachý
- Vladimír Dlouhý
- Miroslav Ballek as Tonda
- Jana Brejchová
- Marie Durnová as Zdena Plachá
- Antonie Hegerlíková
- Jirí Hálek
- Jirí Hána as Bridegroom
- Martha Issová
- Vítězslav Jandák as Narrator
- Jitka Jezková as Bride
- Jaroslava Obermaierová
- Filip Rajmont as Postman
- František Řehák
- Miroslav Simunek
- Jirí Sláma
- Lenka Termerová
