= Ein Stück Himmel =

- Genre: Drama, War
- Based on: A Square of Sky by Janina David
- Written by: Leo Lehman, Günter Kunert
- Directed by: Franz Peter Wirth
- Starring: Dana Vávrová as Janina David
- Composer: Eugen Thomass
- Country of origin: Germany
- Original language: German
- No. of seasons: 1
- No. of episodes: 8

Production
- Cinematography: Gernot Roll
- Production company: Bavaria Atelier GmbH

Original release
- Network: ARD
- Release: 19 April – 7 June 1982

Ein Stück Himmel is a German television series based on Janina David's autobiography A Square of Sky: A Jewish Childhood in Wartime Poland.

== See also ==
- List of German television series
