= Autumn Milk =

1989 film

Autumn Milk (German: Herbstmilch) is a 1989 film directed by Joseph Vilsmaier. It is based on the autobiography of Anna Wimschneider.

The film was bestowed awards at the 39th German Film Awards in Berlin: the silver Filmband for the film and the golden Filmband for new talent for the leading actress Dana Vávrová. It also won new talent awards for Dana Vávrová and Werner Stocker at the 10th Bavarian film prize.

It was a great box-office success, with over two million viewers.

== Plot ==
This cinematic adaptation of the autobiography of Anna Wimschneider depicts her life's experiences and workaday routines as a woman born on a farm in Lower Bavaria, Germany in the 1920s. Anna's mother died young in childbirth and Anna had to take her place and work very hard. At a Nazi Party rally she meets young Albert, who owns a farm. They realize that they both don't believe in fascism and go to a coffee bar where he starts wooing her. Against her prior decision to leave farm life as soon as possible, she agrees to marry him, hoping that her life will become easier on Albert's farm.
