= Janina David =

Holocaust survivor and writer (1930–2023)

Janina Dawidowicz (19 March 1930 – 22 October 2023), better known as Janina David, was a Polish-British Holocaust survivor, writer and translator.

== Biography ==
Janina David was born in Kalisz, Poland on 19 March 1930. The only child to a Jewish Polish family, she moved with them to Warsaw in 1939. After she escaped from the Warsaw Ghetto in 1943, taking refuge with a Polish family of Henryk Rajski and then in a convent, and her parents had died as victims of the Holocaust, she left Poland in 1946 and moved to Paris with an uncle. She then emigrated to Australia where she completed school and studied at the University of Melbourne, gaining a B.A. She then took Australian citizenship. In 1958, she moved to London, where she was a social worker in hospitals. In 1959 she began to write her three-volume autobiography, A Square of Sky, A Touch of Earth and Light over the Water. From 1978, she worked as an author and translator of children's and young people's books, and of radio plays, for the BBC and others. David died on 22 October 2023, at the age of 93.

== Books ==
- 1964 A Square of Sky: A Jewish Childhood in Wartime Poland
- 1966 A Touch of Earth: A Wartime Childhood
- 1995 Light Over the Water: Post-war Wanderings 1946-48 ISBN 978-0-903431-14-9
- 1969 Part of the Main ISBN 978-0-09-096040-8
- 1992 A Square of Sky: A Wartime Childhood from Ghetto to Convent (a republication of A Square of Sky and A Touch of Earth in a single volume) ISBN 978-0-907871-73-6

== Film ==
Franz Peter Wirth filmed Leo Lehmann's adaptation of the book A Square of Sky as the 1982 mini-series Ein Stück Himmel for the ARD and the leading actress Dana Vávrová became popular in Germany in the role of Janina David.

== Theatre ==
Janina David's autobiography A Square of Sky was the basis for a theatre show with the same title.

== Honours ==
- 1982 - Goldener Gong for Ein Stück Himmel, together with Dana Vávrová and Franz Peter Wirth
