= Franz Peter Wirth =

German film director and screenwriter 1919-1999

- Born: 22 September 1919; Munich
- Died: 17 October 1999 (aged 80); Berg, Upper Bavaria
- Occupations: Film director, screenwriter
- Years active: 1954–1999

Franz Peter Wirth (22 September 1919 in Munich – 17 October 1999 in Berg, Upper Bavaria) was a German film director and screenwriter. His film Helden was nominated for an Academy Award for Best Foreign Language Film in 1958.

== Selected filmography ==
=== Film ===
- 1958: … und nichts als die Wahrheit — (based on The Deruga Case by Ricarda Huch)
- 1958: Arms and the Man — (based on Arms and the Man by George Bernard Shaw)
- 1959: People in the Net — (based on a story by Will Tremper)
- 1959: Ein Tag, der nie zu Ende geht
- 1960: The Woman by the Dark Window
- 1961: Girl from Hong Kong — (based on a novel by Heinrich Hauser)
- 1963: Bekenntnisse eines möblierten Herrn — (based on a novel by Oliver Hassencamp)
- 1964: A Man in His Prime — (based on a novel by Rudolf Schneider)
- 1973: Oh Jonathan – oh Jonathan! — (remake of It Started with Eve)

=== Television ===
- 1954: Das Brot des Malers Luschek – (screenplay by Peter Adler)
- 1954: Oskar kommt mit der dritten Stadtbahn – (based on a radio play by Max Gundermann)
- 1954: Der Weihnachtsgast – (based on a play by Charles Vildrac)
- 1955: Chiarevalle wird entdeckt – (based on a play by Nicola Manzari)
- 1955: Unruhige Nacht – (based on Arrow to the Heart by Albrecht Goes)
- 1955: Das Telefon oder Die Liebe zu dritt – (based on The Telephone by Gian Carlo Menotti)
- 1955: Alle meine Söhne – (based on All My Sons by Arthur Miller)
- 1956: Meine Schwester und ich – (based on Meine Schwester und ich)
- 1956: Der Hexer – (based on The Ringer by Edgar Wallace)
- 1956: Schmutzige Hände – (based on Dirty Hands by Jean-Paul Sartre)
- 1956: Der schöne Gleichgültige – (based on Le Bel Indifférent by Jean Cocteau)
- 1956: Jeanne oder Die Lerche – (based on The Lark by Jean Anouilh)
- 1957: Korruption – (based on Corruzione al Palazzo di giustizia by Ugo Betti)
- 1957: Der Richter und sein Henker – (based on The Judge and His Hangman by Friedrich Dürrenmatt)
- 1957: Bernarda Albas Haus – (based on The House of Bernarda Alba by Federico García Lorca)
- 1958: Glaube Liebe Hoffnung – (based on a play by Ödön von Horváth)
- 1958: The Caucasian Chalk Circle – (based on The Caucasian Chalk Circle by Bertolt Brecht)
- 1958: Der Tod des Handlungsreisenden – (based on Death of a Salesman by Arthur Miller)
- 1959: Konto ausgeglichen – (based on The Embezzler by James M. Cain)
- 1959: Raskolnikoff – (based on Dostoevsky's Crime and Punishment)
- 1961: Hamlet – (based on Shakespeare's Hamlet)
- 1961: Alle meine Söhne – (based on All My Sons by Arthur Miller)
- 1961: Zahlungsaufschub – (based on Payment Deferred by C. S. Forester)
- 1961: Der Fall Winslow – (based on The Winslow Boy by Terence Rattigan)
- 1962: Der Hausmeister – (based on The Caretaker by Harold Pinter)
- 1962: Wallenstein – (based on Wallenstein by Friedrich Schiller)
- 1962: Zaubereien oder Die Tücke des Objekts
- 1963: Was Ihr wollt – (based on Shakespeare's Twelfth Night)
- 1963: Don Carlos – (based on Don Carlos by Friedrich Schiller)
- 1964: Der Hund des Generals – (based on a play by Heinar Kipphardt)
- 1964: Karl Sand – (film about Karl Ludwig Sand)
- 1964: Die Geschichte von Joel Brand – (based on the story of Joel Brand, written by Alexander Weissberg-Cybulski)
- 1965: Der arme Mann Luther – (based on a radio play by Leopold Ahlsen)
- 1965: Der Ruepp – (based on a novel by Ludwig Thoma)
- 1965: Antigone – (based on Antigone by Jean Anouilh)
- 1965: Rückkehr von den Sternen – (based on Revenu de l'étoile by André Obey)
- 1966: Herzliches Beileid – (based on Feu la mère de Madame by Georges Feydeau)
- 1966: Geschlossene Gesellschaft – (based on No Exit by Jean-Paul Sartre)
- 1966: Der Regenmacher – (based on The Rainmaker by N. Richard Nash)
- 1966: Ein Schloß – (based on a play by Ivan Klíma)
- 1967: Flucht ohne Ausweg (TV miniseries) – (based on a novel by Kenneth Donald)
- 1967: Das Attentat – Der Tod des Engelbert Dollfuss – (docudrama about the Austrian July Putsch 1934)
- 1967: Nathan the Wise – (based on Nathan the Wise by Gotthold Ephraim Lessing)
- 1967: Der schöne Gleichgültige – (based on Le Bel Indifférent by Jean Cocteau)
- 1967: Walther Rathenau – Untersuchung eines Attentats – (docudrama about the assassination of Walther Rathenau)
- 1968: Schinderhannes – (based on Schinderhannes by Carl Zuckmayer)
- 1968: Schmutzige Hände – (based on Dirty Hands by Jean-Paul Sartre)
- 1968: Die Schlacht bei Lobositz – (based on a play by Peter Hacks)
- 1968: Othello – (based on Shakespeare's Othello)
- 1969: Alte Kameraden – (screenplay by George Hurdalek)
- 1969: Die Zimmerschlacht – (based on a play by Martin Walser)
- 1969: Al Capone im deutschen Wald – (based on a novel by Michail Krausnick about Bernhard Kimmel)
- 1969: Verraten und verkauft – (based on a novel by Donald MacKenzie)
- 1970: Das Haus Lunjowo – (docudrama about the National Committee for a Free Germany)
- 1970: Die Marquise von B. – (film about Madame de Brinvilliers)
- 1971: Change – (based on a play by Wolfgang Bauer)
- 1971: Willy und Lilly – (screenplay by Manfred Bieler)
- 1971: Operation Walküre – (docudrama about the 20 July plot)
- 1971: Die Messe der erfüllten Wünsche – (based on a novella by Vladimír Páral)
- 1972: Die rote Kapelle (TV miniseries) – (series about the Red Orchestra)
- 1972: Eisenwichser – (based on a play by Heinrich Henkel)
- 1972–1973: Alexander Zwo (TV miniseries)
- 1973: Nicht einmal das halbe Leben – (based on a novel by Alexandr Kliment)
- 1974: Der zerbrochene Krug – (based on The Broken Jug by Heinrich von Kleist)
- 1974: Synchron oder Man kann auch anders – (screenplay by Robert Neumann)
- 1974: Plus minus null
- 1974: Strychnin und saure Drops – (anthology film, screenplay by Leopold Ahlsen)
- 1975: Tatort: Wodka Bitter-Lemon
- 1975: Der Biberpelz – (based on The Beaver Coat by Gerhart Hauptmann)
- 1975: Derrick: Paddenberg
- 1975: Der Wittiber – (based on a novel by Ludwig Thoma)
- 1975: Ein schönes Paar – (based on a play by John O'Hare)
- 1975: Baby Hamilton oder Das kommt in den besten Familien vor – (based on a play by Maurice Braddell and Anita Hart)
- 1975: Die Verschwörung des Fiesco zu Genua – (based on Schiller's Fiesco)
- 1976: Julia und Romeo – (What if Romeo and Juliet survived?)
- 1976: Insel der Rosen – (based on a play by Sławomir Mrożek)
- 1976: Minna von Barnhelm – (based on Minna von Barnhelm by Gotthold Ephraim Lessing)
- 1976: Derrick: Risiko
- 1976: Die Leute von Feichtenreut – (based on a novel by Hannes Burger)
- 1977: Emigranten – (based on a play by Sławomir Mrożek)
- 1977: Roulette – (based on a play by Pavel Kohout)
- 1977: Generale – Anatomie der Marneschlacht – (screenplay by Sebastian Haffner, docudrama about the Battle of the Marne)
- 1977: Ein Mann wird jünger – (based on a play by Italo Svevo)
- 1978: Wallenstein (TV miniseries) – (based on a Wallenstein biography by Golo Mann)
- 1979: The Buddenbrooks (TV miniseries) – (based on Buddenbrooks by Thomas Mann)
- 1980: Tatort: Mit nackten Füßen
- 1982: Ein Stück Himmel (TV miniseries) – (screenplay by Günter Kunert and Leo Lehman, based on the autobiography of Janina David)
- 1982: Georg Thomallas Geschichten (TV series, 2 episodes)
- 1982: Egmont – (based on Goethe's Egmont)
- 1983: Deep Water – (based on Deep Water by Patricia Highsmith)
- 1984: Vor dem Sturm (TV miniseries) – (based on a novel by Theodor Fontane)
- 1984: Hildes Endspiel – Eine Vorstadtballade
- 1984: Don Carlos – (based on Don Carlos by Friedrich Schiller)
- 1984: Geld oder Leben – (anthology film)
- 1984–1985: Polizeiinspektion 1 (TV series, 6 episodes)
- 1986: Die Wächter (TV miniseries) – (based on The Guardians by John Christopher)
- 1986: Spätes Erröten – (based on The Understanding by Angela Huth)
- 1986: Zerbrochene Brücken – (based on the autobiography of Lily Braun)
- 1987: Derrick: Koldaus letzte Reise
- 1987: Wallenstein – (based on Wallenstein by Friedrich Schiller)
- 1987: Derrick: Mordfall Goos
- 1988: Familienschande – (based on Family Skeletons by Patrick Quentin)
- 1989: Karambolage
- 1990: Notenwechsel
- 1990: Derrick: Solo für Vier
- 1992: Dornberger
- 1992–1993: Weißblaue Geschichten (TV series, 2 episodes)
- 1994–1995: Frankenberg (TV series, 15 episodes)
- 1996: Der Mann ohne Schatten (TV series, 2 episodes)
- 1996: Adieu, mon ami – (based on a novel by Barbara Noack)
- 1997: Sophie – Schlauer als die Polizei (TV series, 6 episodes)
- 1998: Die Unbestechliche (TV series, 3 episodes)
- 1999: Typisch Ed!
