= Joseph Vilsmaier =

German film director (1939–2020)

- Born: 24 January 1939; Munich, Bavaria, Nazi Germany
- Died: 11 February 2020 (aged 81); Munich, Bavaria, Germany
- Occupation: Film director
- Years active: 1970–2020

Joseph Vilsmaier (pronounced [ˈjoːzɛf ˈfɪlsmaɪ.ɐ], 24 January 1939 – 11 February 2020) was a German film director who began his career as a technician and cameraman. He is internationally known for films such as Comedian Harmonists.

== Life ==
Born in Munich. Vilsmaier attended a boarding school near Augsburg. He then trained as a technician to make film cameras, and studied piano at the Musikhochschule München. He was a member of a jazz group. After working as a technician, he moved into film, first as a material and camera assistant, then from 1961 as a cameraman. He filmed episodes of television series such as Tatort.

His debut film as director, Herbstmilch in 1988, starring his wife, Dana Vávrová, was a huge success. In 1995, he directed Schlafes Bruder, after the novel by Robert Schneider. In 1997, he directed Comedian Harmonists which became an international success. For the films he directed, Vilsmaier was also the producer and first cameraman.

While filming Der Letzte Zug in 2005, probably the last film produced by Artur Brauner, he was injured when he fell off a camera tower. Subsequently, his ability to work was limited, and his wife took over directing the film. The couple was awarded the special jury prize at the 2006 Bavarian Film Awards for Der letzte Zug.

Vávrová died on 5 February 2009. The couple had three daughters, Janina, Theresa, and Josefina, all of whom became actresses and starred in a number of their films.

Vilsmaier died on 11 February 2020.

== Awards ==
- Bavarian Film Awards
  - 1990 Best Production
  - 1992 Bavarian Film Awards, Best Producing, Best Cinematography
  - 1995 Bavarian Film Award, Best Production
  - 1997 Bavarian Film Award, Best Director
  - 2006 Bavarian Film Award, Special Prize
- 18th Moscow International Film Festival
  - Nominated – Stalingrad

== Filmography ==
Vilsmaier directed films and television films, including:

- Herbstmilch (1989)
- Rama dama (1990)
- Stalingrad (1993)
- Charlie & Louise – Das doppelte Lottchen (1994)
- Schlafes Bruder (1995)
- And Nobody Weeps for Me (1996)
- Comedian Harmonists (1997)
- Marlene (2000)
- Leo & Claire (2001)
- Rock Crystal (2004)
- The Last Train (Der letzte Zug) (2006)
- Ship of No Return: The Final Voyage of the Gustloff (2008, TV film)
- The Legend of Brandner Kaspar (2008)
- Nanga Parbat (2010)
- Russisch Roulette (2012, TV film)
- The Perjured Farmer (2012, TV film)
- Bavaria – Traumreise durch Bayern (2012)
