= List of LGBTQ-related films of 2004 =

This is a list of lesbian, gay, bisexual, transgender or queer-related films released in 2004. It contains theatrically released films that deal with important gay, lesbian, bisexual, transgender or queer characters or issues and may have same-sex romance or relationships as a plot device.

== Films ==
Title	Director	Country	Genre	Cast	Notes
3 Dancing Slaves	Gaël Morel	France	Drama	Nicolas Cazalé, Stéphane Rideau, Thomas Dumerchez, Salim Kechiouche, Bruno Lochet, Vincent Martinez, Jackie Berroyer, Aure Atika, Nicolas Paz, Mathias Olivier, Gary Mary, Geordie Piseri-Diaz, Clément Dettli, Pierre Vallin and Janine Ribollet	
The 24th Day	Tony Piccirillo	United States	Thriller	James Marsden, Scott Speedman, Sofía Vergara, Barry Papick, Charlie Corrado, Jarvis W. George, Scott Roman, Jeffrey Frost, Jona Harvey, Thea Chaloner and Brian Campbell	Based on Piccirillo's play of the same name
7 mujeres, 1 homosexual y Carlos	Rene Bueno	Mexico; United States	Comedy, drama	Mauricio Ochmann, Adriana Fonseca, Ninel Conde, Luis Felipe Tovar, Wasiq Rashid, Verónica Segura, Sujosh Basak, David Eduardo, Beatriz Llamas, Paco Rocher and Anaís Belén	a.k.a. 7 women, 1 homosexual and Carlos
Agnes and His Brothers	Oskar Roehler	Germany	Comedy, drama	Martin Weiß, Moritz Bleibtreu, Herbert Knaup, Katja Riemann, Tom Schilling, Suzan Anbeh, Vadim Glowna, Margit Carstensen, Lee Daniels, Marie Zielcke, Oliver Korittke, Martin Semmelrogge, Martin Feifel, Sven Martinek and Til Schweiger	a.k.a. Agnes und seine Brüder
Aishite Imasu 1941: Mahal Kita	Joel Lamangan	Philippines	Drama	Judy Ann Santos, Raymart Santiago, Jay Manalo, Dennis Trillo, Marco Alcaraz, Angelu de Leon, Jacklyn Jose, Yasmien Kurdi, Anita Linda, T.J. Trinidad, Iya Villania, Tony Mabesa, Domingo Landicho, Jim Pebanco and Virginia Joshen	a.k.a. I love You
Alexander	Oliver Stone	United States	Drama	Colin Farrell, Jessie Kamm, Connor Paolo, Angelina Jolie, Val Kilmer, Anthony Hopkins, Elliot Cowan, Robert Earley, Jared Leto, Patrick Carroll, Rosario Dawson, Christopher Plummer, David Bedella, Fiona O'Shaughnessy, Brian Blessed, Gary Stretch, John Kavanagh, Nick Dunning, Marie Meyer, Mick Lally, Joseph Morgan, Ian Beattie, Jonathan Rhys Meyers, Morgan Christopher Ferris, Denis Conway, Peter Williamson, Neil Jackson, Aleczander Gordon, Garrett Lombard, Chris Aberdein, Rory McCann, Tim Pigott-Smith, Raz Degan, Erol Sander, Stéphane Ferrara, Tadhg Murphy, Francisco Bosch, Annelise Hesme, Toby Kebbell, Laird Macintosh, Féodor Atkine, Bin Bunluerit, Jaran Ngramdee and Brian McGrath	Based on the life of Alexander the Great and a book about him by Robin Lane Fox
Anatomy of Hell	Catherine Breillat	France	Adult, drama	Amira Casar, Rocco Siffredi, Catherine Breillat, Alexandre Belin, Manuel Taglang, Jacques Monge, Claudio Carvalho, Carolina Lopes, Diego Rodrigues, João Marques, Bruno Fernandes, Maria Edite Moreira and Maria João Santos	a.k.a. Anatomie de i'enfer; based on Breillat's novel Pornocratie
Andrew and Jeremy Get Married	Don Boyd	United Kingdom	Documentary	Andrew Thomas, Jeremy Trafford and Hanif Kureishi	Nominated for the British Independent Film Award for best British documentary.
Bad Education	Pedro Almodóvar	Spain	Drama	Gael García Bernal, Fele Martínez, Raúl García Forneiro, Daniel Giménez Cacho, Javier Cámara, Petra Martínez, Leonor Watling, Lluís Homar, Francisco Boira, Nacho Pérez, Juan Fernández and Alberto Ferreiro	a.k.a. La mala educación
Bear Cub	Miguel Albaladejo	Spain	Comedy, drama	José Luis García Pérez, David Castillo, Daniel Llobregat, Diana Cerezo, Arno Chevrier, Empar Ferrer, Elvira Lindo and Mario Arias	a.k.a. Cachorro
Billy's Dad Is a Fudge-Packer	Jamie Donahue	United States	Short, comedy	Spencer Daniels, Robert Gant, Cady Huffman, Alex Borstein, Gina Rodgers and D. C. Douglas	
The Blackwater Lightship	John Erman	United States	Drama	Dianne Wiest, Gina McKee, Keith McErlean, Angela Lansbury, Marijka Bardin, Sean Campion, Barry Cassin, Angela Harding, Laura Hughes, Ruth McCabe, Frank McCusker, Maria McDermottroe, Dearbhla Molloy, Brían F. O'Byrne, Kevin O'Dwyer, David Parnell, Sam Robards and Macdara Ó Fátharta	Lansbury received an Emmy nomination for it in 2004.
Blood	Jerry Ciccoritti	Canada	Drama	Jacob Tierney, Emily Hampshire	Based on the play of the same name by Tom Walmsley
Brother to Brother	Rodney Evans	United States	Drama	Anthony Mackie, Roger Robinson, Alex Burns, Kevin Jackson, Billoah Greene, Brad Bailey, Brian Everett Chandler, Shantell Herndon, Ryan Michelle Bathe, Duane Boutte, Lawrence Gilliard Jr., Oni Faida Lampley, James Martinez, Lucas Papaelias, Daniel Sunjata, Ray Ford, Randy Frazier, Carlton J. Smith, Lance Reddick, Chad L. Coleman, Leith M. Burke, Aunjanue Ellis, Anthony Briatico, Reid Mihalko, Bent-Jorgen Perlmutt, Richard Bekins, Adam Wade, Bradley Cole, Raphael Peacock, Lizan Mitchell, Tom Wiggin, J. Kyle Manzay, Michael Duvert, Tracie Thoms, Curtis McClarin and Michael Mosley	
Butterfly	Yan Yan Mak	Hong Kong	Drama	Josie Ho, Eric Kot, Yuan Tian, Stephanie Che, Yat Ning Chan, Joman Chiang, Kenneth Tsang, Pauline Yam, Carl Ng, Yuen-Leung Poon, Redbean Lau, Brenda Chan, King-Suen Chan, Kathi DeCouto, Alice Lee, Nicky Shih, Stanley Tam and Wong Sin Ting Zeni	a.k.a. Hu die; based on the novel The Mark of Butterfly by Xue Chen
Calvaire	Fabrice Du Welz	Belgium; France; Luxembourg	Drama, horror	Laurent Lucas, Brigitte Lahaie, Gigi Coursigny, Jean-Luc Couchard, Jackie Berroyer, Philippe Nahon, Philippe Grand'Henry, Jo Prestia, Marc Lefebvre, Alfred David-Pingouin, Alain Delaunois, Vincent Cahay and Johan Meys	Known in English as The Ordeal
Cazuza - O Tempo Não Pára	Walter Carvalho, Sandra Werneck	Brazil	Drama, biography	Daniel de Oliveira, Marieta Severo, Reginaldo Faria, Andréa Beltrão, Leandra Leal, Emílio de Mello, Cadu Fávero, André Gonçalves, Arlindo Lopes, Dudu Azevedo, André Pfeffer, Eduardo Pires, Maria Flor, Fernanda Boechat, Pierre Santos, Victor Hugo, Débora Falabella, Maria Mariana and André Moraes	a.k.a. Cazuza - Time Doesn't Stop
Changing Times	André Téchiné	France	Drama	Catherine Deneuve, Gérard Depardieu, Gilbert Melki, Malik Zidi, Lubna Azabal, Nadem Rachati, Tanya Lopert, Nabila Baraka and Idir Elomri	a.k.a. Les temps qui changent
Colour Blossoms	Yonfan	Hong Kong	Drama	Teresa Cheung, Keiko Matsuzaka, Harisu, Carl Ng and Sho Yokouchi	a.k.a. Toh sik
Connie and Carla	Michael Lembeck	United States	Comedy	Nia Vardalos, Toni Collette, David Duchovny, Stephen Spinella, Alec Mapa, Christopher Logan, Robert Kaiser, Ian Gomez, Robert John Burke, Boris McGiver, Nick Sandow, Dash Mihok, Chelah Horsdal, Debbie Reynolds and Greg Grunberg	
Crutch	Rob Moretti	United States	Drama	Eben Gordon, Rob Moretti, Juanita Walsh, Jennifer Laine Williams, Jennifer Katz, James A. Earley, Robert Bray, Laura O'Reilly, Tim Loftus, Sylvia Norman, Frankie Faison and Tia Dionne Hodge	
D.E.B.S.	Angela Robinson	United States	Comedy	Sara Foster, Jordana Brewster, Meagan Good, Devon Aoki, Jill Ritchie, Geoff Stults, Jimmi Simpson, Holland Taylor, Michael Clarke Duncan, Jessica Cauffiel, Aimee Garcia, Jennifer Carpenter and Scoot McNairy	Based on a 2003 short film of the same name by same writer
De-Lovely	Irwin Winkler	United States; United Kingdom	Drama	Kevin Kline, Ashley Judd, Jonathan Pryce, Kevin McNally, Sandra Nelson, Allan Corduner, Peter Polycarpou, Keith Allen, James Wilby, Kevin McKidd, Richard Dillane, John Barrowman, Peter Jessop, Edward Baker-Duly, Jeff Harding and Caroline O'Connor	Based on the life and career of Cole Porter
Dorian Blues	Tennyson Bardwell	United States	Comedy	Michael McMillian, Lea Coco, Steven Charles Fletcher, Mo Quigley, Austin Basis, Ryan Kelly Berkowitz, Chris Dallman, Carl Danna, Leslie Elliard, Sian Heder, Cody Nickell and Jeff Paul	
Eating Out	Q. Allan Brocka	United States	Comedy, drama, romance	Rebekah Kochan, Ryan Carnes, Jim Verraros, Scott Lunsford, Emily Stiles, Natalie Burge, Billy Shepard, John Janezic, Stafford "Doc" Williamson, Jillian Nusbaum, Murph Michaels and Martie van der Voort	
Enduring Love	Roger Michell	United Kingdom	Thriller	Daniel Craig, Rhys Ifans	Based on novel of the same name by Ian McEwan
Enter the Phoenix	Stephen Fung	Hong Kong	Comedy	Eason Chan, Daniel Wu, Karen Mok, Chapman To, Law Kar-ying, Stephen Fung, Yuen Biao, Nicholas Tse, Jackie Chan, Brian Lee, Michael Chan, Philip Ng, Chapman To, Sam Lee, Sammi Cheng, Hayama Go, Chan Wai-Man, Lee Lik-Chi, Glen Chin, Maggie Lau, Koey Wong, Tenky Kai Man Tin, Courtney Wu, Ankee Leung and Sam Hoh	a.k.a. Da lao ai mei li
Ethan Mao	Quentin Lee	Canada; United States	Drama, thriller	Jun Hee Lee, Raymond Ma, Julia Nickson-Soul, Kevin Kleinberg, Jerry Hernandez and David Tran	
Eulogy	Michael Clancy	United States; United Kingdom; Germany	Comedy, drama	Zooey Deschanel, Hank Azaria, Famke Janssen, Kelly Preston, Ray Romano, Debra Winger, Jesse Bradford, Glenne Headly, Piper Laurie, Rip Torn, Rance Howard, Paget Brewster, Eric Peirpoint, Sherman Howard, René Auberjonois, Claudette Nevins, Matthew Feder, Allisyn Ashley Arm, Michael Panes, Michael Chapman, Vincent Castellanos and Brian Posehn	
Everyone	Bill Marchant	Canada	Comedy	Matt Fentiman, Mark Hildreth, Brendan Fletcher, Katherine Billings, Michael Chase, Suzanne Hepburn, Bill Marchant, Cara McDowell, Andrew Moxham, Stephen Park, Carly Pope, Tom Scholte, Nancy Sivak, Debra Thorne and Anna Williams	
Formula 17	Yin-jung Chen	Taiwan	Comedy	Tony Yang, Duncan Lai, Jin Qin, Jason Chang, Dada Ji, James Yun, Jeff Locker, Ladder Yu, Huang Guan-Jie and Yang Tze-Long	a.k.a. 17 sui de tian kong
Girl Play	Lee Friedlander	United States	Comedy	Robin Greenspan, Lacie Harmon, Mink Stole, Dom DeLuise, Katherine Randolph, Lauren Maher, Gina DeVivo, Shannon Perez, Dominic Ottersbach, Julie Briggs, Peter Ente, Graham T. McClusky, Skye Emerson, Jessica Golden, Lynn A. Henderson and Sara Bareilles	
Girlfriend	Karan Razdan	India	Drama	Isha Koppikar, Amrita Arora, Aashish Chaudhary, Sumeet Nijhawan, Shantanu Chappana and Dolly Malhotra	
Grande École	Robert Salis	France	Drama	Gregori Baquet, Alice Taglioni, Jocelyn Quivrin, Élodie Navarre, Arthur Jugnot, Salim Kechiouche, Éva Darlan, Lakshantha Abenayake, Yasmine Belmadi, Jacques Collard, Jo Prestia, Jamal Hadir, Gilbert Desveaux, Arnaud Binard, Adan Jodorowsky, Jean-Michel Cannone, Hanifa Mizi-Alloua, Eva Saint-Paul, Jean-Loup Wolff, Eric Seigne and Pierre Aussedat	Screenplay by Salis and Jean-Marie Besset, based on the latter's play The Best of Schools
Guys and Balls	Sherry Hormann	Germany	Comedy, drama	Eileen Eilender, Leon Breitenborn, Dietmar Bär, Saskia Vester, Anna Koesling, Steven Wellmann, Melody Sitta, Jan Giffel, Maximilian Brückner, Willi Thomczyk, Jochen Stern, Judith Hoersch, Carlo Ljubek, Mirko Lang, Tobias van Dieken, Simon Solberg, Felix Vörtler, Lisa Maria Potthoff, Hans Löw, Nikolai Will, Rolf Zacher, Mariele Millowitsch, Ute Maria Lerner, Nicholas Bodeux, David Rott, Heppi Pohl, Dirk Koch, Andreas Schmidt, Michael Kleiber, Hans-Joachim Bauer, Billey Demirtas, Markus John, Christian Berkel and Charly Hübner	a.k.a. Männer wie wir
Harry + Max	Christopher Münch	United States	Drama	Bryce Johnson, Cole Williams, Rain Phoenix, Katherine Ellis, Roni Deitz, Tom Gilroy, Michelle Phillips, Justin Zachary, Max Piscioneri and Mark L. Young	
Head in the Clouds	John Duigan	United Kingdom; Canada	Drama	Charlize Theron, Jolyane Langlois, Penélope Cruz, Stuart Townsend, Thomas Kretschmann, Steven Berkoff, David La Haye, Karine Vanasse, Gabriel Hogan, John Jorgensen and Christine Solomon	
Hidden Fuhrer: Debating the Enigma of Hitler's Sexuality	Fenton Bailey, Randy Barbato	United States	Documentary	Interviewees; Geoffrey Giles, Brigitte Hamann, Ron Rosenbaum, Ralf Dose and Michelangelo Signorile	Based on Lothar Machtan's 2001 book The Hidden Hitler that claimed Adolf Hitler was a homosexual
A Home at the End of the World	Michael Mayer	United States	Drama	Colin Farrell, Dallas Roberts, Robin Wright Penn, Sissy Spacek, Matt Frewer, Erik Scott Smith, Harris Allan and Asia Vieira	Screenplay by Michael Cunningham, based on his novel of the same name
Home of Phobia	Ryan Shiraki	United States	Drama	Sam Huntington, Kaitlin Doubleday, Marla Sokoloff, Mike Erwin, Heather Matarazzo, Jud Tylor and John Goodman	a.k.a. Freshman Orientation
Hellbent	Paul Etheredge-Ouzts	United States	Horror	Dylan Fergus, Bryan Kirkwood, Hank Harris, Andrew Levitas, Matt Phillips, Kent Bradley James, Wren T. Brown, Nina Landey, Samuel A. Levine, Kris Andersson, Shaun T. Benjamin, Baron Rogers, Miguel Angel Caballero, Blake Davis, Jerry Farmer, Rafael Feldman, Yan Feldman, Jazzmun, Jamila Jones, Texas Terri, Dionne Lea, Paul Lekakis, Michael Louden, Ryan McTavish, John P. Petrelli, Joe Sabatino, Stanton Schnepp, Nick Collins, Danny Seckel, Rachel Sterling, Eric Stiles and Colton Ford	
Ice Men	Thom Best	Canada	Drama	Martin Cummins, David Hewlett, Greg Spottiswood, James Thomas, Ian Tracey, Brandy Ledford, Thea Gill, Galen Dineen, Henry Dineen, Justin Heeley, Keith Jackson and Travis Ryder	
Imaginary Heroes	Dan Harris	United States; Germany; Belgium	Drama	Sigourney Weaver, Jeff Daniels, Emile Hirsch, Michelle Williams, Deirdre O'Connell, Ryan Donowho and Kip Pardue	
Jack	Lee Rose	United States	Drama	Anton Yelchin, Stockard Channing, Ron Silver	TV movie; teleplay by A. M. Homes, based on his novel of the same name
Jailbait	Brett C. Leonard	United States	Drama	Stephen Adly Guirgis, Michael Pitt, Laila Robins, David Zayas, Eric Trosman, Brian Albanese, Brad Lee Wind and Ray Wineteer	
John and Michael	Shira Avni	Canada	Animated, short	Brian Davis (narrator)	
Keep Not Silent	Ilil Alexander	Israel	Documentary	3 Lesbians; Yudit, Miriam-Ester and Ruth	a.k.a. Et Sheaava Nafshi, it won the Israeli Academy award for Best Documentary Film 2004
Kinsey	Bill Condon	United States	Drama	Liam Neeson, Benjamin Walker, Matthew Fahey, Will Denton, Laura Linney, Peter Sarsgaard, Chris O'Donnell, Timothy Hutton, John Lithgow, Tim Curry, Oliver Platt, Dylan Baker, William Sadler, John McMartin, John Krasinski, Lynn Redgrave, Julianne Nicholson, Veronica Cartwright, Kathleen Chalfant, Heather Goldenhersh, David Harbour, Judith J.K. Polson, Leigh Spofford, Jenna Gavigan, Luke MacFarlane and Bill Buell	
Love in Thoughts	Achim von Borries	Germany	Drama	Daniel Brühl, August Diehl, Anna Maria Mühe, Jana Pallaske, Thure Lindhardt, Verena Bukal, Julia Dietze, Buddy Elias, Luc Feit, Marius Frey, Holger Handtke, Jonas Jägermeyr, Roman Kaminski, Christoph Luser, Tino Mewes, Thomas Neumann, Thomas Schendel, Fabian Oscar Wien and Jürgen Wink	
Love on the Side	Vic Sarin	Canada; United States	Romance, comedy	Marla Sokoloff, Jennifer Tilly, Monika Schnarre, Dave Thomas, Jonathan Cherry, Marnie Alton, Barry Watson, Peter Benson, Kee Chan, Len Doncheff, Aaron Grain, Jesse Moss, Alvin Sanders, Frank C. Turner, Matthew Safran and Yvette Yip	
Mango Kiss	Sascha Rice	United States	Comedy, romance	Danièle Ferraro, Michelle Wolff, Sally Kirkland, Dru Mouser, Tina Marie Murray, Shannon Rossiter, Joe Mellis, Malia Spanyol, Windy Morgan Bunts, Dominique Zeltzman, Lena Zee, Alicia Simmons-Miracle, Laura Baca, Max Miller, Walter Barry, Chris Villa, Delphine Brody and Katherine Armstrong	Co-written by Sarah Brown, based on her play Bermuda Triangles
The Merchant of Venice	Michael Radford	United States; United Kingdom; Italy; Luxembourg	Drama, romance	Al Pacino, Jeremy Irons, Joseph Fiennes, Lynn Collins, Zuleikha Robinson, Kris Marshall, Charlie Cox, Heather Goldenhersh, Mackenzie Crook, John Sessions, Gregor Fisher, Ron Cook, Allan Corduner, Anton Rodgers, David Harewood and Jules Werner	Based on the play of the same name by William Shakespeare
My Summer of Love	Pawel Pawlikowski	United Kingdom	Drama, romance, thriller	Natalie Press, Emily Blunt, Paddy Considine, Dean Andrews, Michelle Byrne, Paul-Anthony Barber, Lynette Edwards and Kathryn Sumner	Based on the novel of the same name by Helen Cross
Mysterious Skin	Gregg Araki	United States; Netherlands	Drama	Joseph Gordon-Levitt, Chase Ellison, Brady Corbet, Michelle Trachtenberg, Jeff Licon, Mary Lynn Rajskub, Elisabeth Shue, Bill Sage, Chris Mulkey, Lisa Long, Richard Riehle, Kelly Kruger, Rachael Nastassja Kraft and Billy Drago	Based on the novel of the same name by Scott Heim; 2004 Bergen International Film Festival – Jury Award, 2006 Icelandic Queer Film Festival - Best Fictional Work
Producing Adults	Aleksi Salmenperä	Finland; Sweden	Comedy, drama	Minna Haapkylä, Kari-Pekka Toivonen, Minttu Mustakallio, Tommi Eronen, Pekka Strang and Dick Idman	a.k.a. Lapsia ja aikuisia – Kuinka niitä tehdään?
Prom Queen: The Marc Hall Story	John L'Ecuyer	Canada	Comedy, drama	Aaron Ashmore, Mac Fyfe, Tamara Hope, Trevor Blumas and Dave Foley	
The Raspberry Reich	Bruce LaBruce	Germany; Canada	Comedy	Susanne Sachße, Daniel Bätscher, Andreas Stich, Dean Monroe, Anton Z. Risan, Daniel Fettig, Gerrit, Joeffrey, Ulrike Schirm, Keith Levy, Stephan Dilschneider, Pünktchen, Sven Reinhard, Genesis P-Orridge, Naushad, Huseyin Gunus, Alfredo Holz, Claus Matthes, Rafael Caba, Mischka Kral, Marco Volk, Darius Sautter Aschkanpour and Daniel Hendricksen	
Rice Rhapsody	Kenneth Bi	Singapore Hong Kong Australia	Comedy Drama	Sylvia Chang, Martin Yan, Mélanie Laurent, LePham Tan, Andy Mok, Craig Toh, Alvin Chiang, Maggie Q, Ivy Ling Po, Chin Han, Samuel Chong and Steph Song	
Ryan	Chris Landreth	Canada	Documentary	Ryan Larkin	
The Sadness of Johnson Joe Jangles	Jeffrey St. Jules	Canada	Short drama	Zachary Bennett, Gregory White, Soo Garay	
Saved!	Brian Dannelly	United States	Comedy, drama	Jena Malone, Mandy Moore, Macaulay Culkin, Eva Amurri, Patrick Fugit, Elizabeth Thai, Chad Faust, Martin Donovan, Heather Matarazzo, Mary-Louise Parker and Dave Rosin	
Saving Face	Alice Wu	United States	Comedy, drama	Lynn Chen, Michelle Krusiec, Joan Chen, Jin Wang, Guang Lan Koh, Jessica Hecht, Ato Essandoh, Wang Luoyong, David Shih, Brian Yang, Nathaniel Geng and Mao Zhao	
She Hate Me	Spike Lee	United States	Comedy, drama	Anthony Mackie, Kerry Washington, Ellen Barkin, Monica Bellucci, Brian Dennehy, Woody Harrelson, Bai Ling, John Turturro	
Shiner	Christian Calson	United States	Drama	Scott Stepp, Derris Nile, Ryan Soteres, Carolyn Crotty, Seth Harrington, David Zelina, Nicholas King and Conny Van Dyke	
Simon	Eddy Terstall	Netherlands	Comedy, drama	Cees Geel, Marcel Hensema, Rifka Lodeizen, Nadja Hüpscher, Eva Duijvestein, Daan Ekkel, Dirk Zeelenberg, Stijn Koomen, Johnny de Mol, Maria Kooistra, Femke Lakerveld, Natasja Loturco, Araba Walton, Medi Broekman, Dennis Rudge, Helena Remeijers, Esmarel Gasman, Wilhelmija Lamp, Klavertje Patijn, Ron Schuitemaker, Jenayden Adriaan, Lisa Kuil, Laura Dozzelne, Jeroen Willems, Aaron Wan, Howard van Dodemont, Henk Kreekel, Nico Huisman, Emmanuel K. Obinna, Troy Patterson, Matt Kosokoff and Pee Chantrarangsan	
Sissy Boy Slap Party	Guy Maddin	Canada	Experimental short	Louis Negin, Noam Gonick, John K. Samson	New recreation of Maddin's lost 1994 film of the same title.
The Ski Trip	Maurice Jamal	United States	Romance, comedy	Daren Fleming, Cassandra Cruz, John Rankin, Nathan Hale, Haaz Sleiman	A sequel in 2008, was film Friends & Lovers: The Ski Trip 2 but never found a distributor
So Happy Together	Joel Lamangan	Philippines	Comedy, drama	Kris Aquino, Eric Quizon, Tonton Gutierrez, Gloria Diaz, Cogie Domingo, Nova Villa, Jay-R, Mark Herras, Jennylyn Mercado, Yasmien Kurdi, Rainier Castillo, Linda Gordon, Miguel Garcia, Carlo Maceda, Paolo Paraiso, Clint Pijuan, Richard Quan, Douglas Robinson, Jon Romano and Jojo Vinzon	
Stage Beauty	Richard Eyre	United Kingdom; Germany; United States	Drama	Billy Crudup, Claire Danes, Tom Wilkinson, Rupert Everett, Zoe Tapper, Richard Griffiths, Hugh Bonneville, Ben Chaplin, Edward Fox, Alice Eve, Stephen Marcus and Tom Hollander	Screenplay by Jeffrey Hatcher, based on his stage play Compleat Female Stage Beauty
Star Appeal	Cui Zi'en	China	Science fiction, drama	Yu Bo, Guifeng Wang, Xiwen Zhang and Jian Hou	
Straight-Jacket	Richard Day	United States	Comedy	Matt Letscher, Carrie Preston, Adam Greer, Veronica Cartwright, Jack Plotnick, Michael Emerson and Sam Pancake	Based on Day's play of the same name; pastiche of the romantic comedy films starring Rock Hudson and Doris Day
Strange Fruit	Kyle Schickner	United States	Drama	Kent Faulcon, Berlinda Tolbert, David Raibon, Christopher Warren, Sam Jones, Vergil J. Smith, Shane Woodson, Ed Brigadier, Charlie Schroeder, Jared Day, Jon Finck, Ron Bottitta, Christopher May, Cecile M. Johnson, Emily Gorgen, Earl Thompson, Harace Carpenter, Leon Morenzie, Ron Allen, Walt Turner, Wilbert Lewis, Gavin Lewis, Carlo Daquin, Tommy Cole, Tory Andrews, Arthur LeBlanc, Randy Maggiore, Lakesha Lenoir, Ted Duhon, Agnes DeRouen, Richard Pushkin and David L. Corrigan	
Stupid Boy (Garçon stupide)	Lionel Baier	France; Switzerland	Comedy, drama	Pierre Chatagny, Natacha Koutchoumov, Rui Pedro Alves and Lionel Baier	
Sugar	John Palmer	United States	Drama	Andre Noble, Marnie McPhail, Haylee Wanstall, Jeffrey Parazzo, Michael Barry and Brendan Fehr	
Summer Storm	Marco Kreuzpaintner	Germany	Comedy, drama	Robert Stadlober, Kostja Ullmann, Alicja Bachleda-Curuś, Miriam Morgenstern, Jürgen Tonkel, Tristano Casanova, Marlon Kittel, Hanno Koffler, Ludwig Blochberger, Alexa Maria Surholt and Joseph M'Barek	a.k.a. Sommersturm
Take a Deep Breath	Dragan Marinkovic	Serbia and Montenegro	Drama	Ana Franić, Jelena Đokić, Mira Furlan, Bogdan Diklić, Branislav Tomašević, Nikola Đuričko, Goran Šušljik, Ana Sakić, Bojan Dimitrijević, Jelena Helc, Tatjana Torbica, Danijela Mihailović, Mihajlo Bata Paskaljević and Petar Kralj	a.k.a. Disi duboko
Touch of Pink	Ian Iqbal Rashid	United Kingdom; Canada	Comedy, drama	Jimi Mistry, Suleka Mathew, Kristen Holden-Ried, Kyle MacLachlan, Veena Sood, Brian George, Liisa Repo-Martell, Raoul Bhaneja, Malika Mendez, Linda Thorson, Andrew Gillies and Dean McDermott	
Tropical Malady	Apichatpong Weerasethakul	Thailand; France; Germany; Italy	Drama	Banlop Lomnoi, Sakda Kaewbuadee, Huai Dessom, Sirivech Jareonchon and Udom Promma	a.k.a. Sud pralad
Tying the Knot	Jim de Sève	United States	Documentary	Uses archive footage of politician Bob Barr, lawyer Mary Bonauto, Brian Brown from National Organization for Marriage, Rev. Pat Bumgardner, George W. Bush, Judge Charles Canady, Tampa mayoral candidate Jane E. Castor, Bill Clinton, Jeff Cook-McCormac, Francis Ford Coppola, evangelical Christian James C. Dobson, lawyer Karen Doering and Arthur Evans (author)	Examines same sex marriage
Walk on Water	Eytan Fox	Israel; Sweden	Drama	Lior Ashkenazi, Knut Berger, Caroline Peters, Gideon Shemer, Carola Regnier	
Wanted!	Franziska Meletzky	Germany	Drama	Dagmar Manzel, Grażyna Szapołowska, Jörg Schüttauf, Berndt Stübner, Ramona Kunze-Libnow, Helge Lang, Detlef Kapplusch, Kirsten Block, Matthias Brenner, Simone Kabst, Frank Auerbach, Marcus Kaloff, Wolfgang Boos, Marylu Poolman and Daniel Schröder	a.k.a. Nachbarinnen
Wilby Wonderful	Daniel MacIvor	Canada	Comedy, drama	James Allodi, Maury Chaykin, Paul Gross, Rebecca Jenkins, Sandra Oh, Elliot Page, Callum Keith Rennie and Daniel MacIvor	
Wild Side	Sébastien Lifshitz	France; Belgium; United Kingdom	Drama	Stéphanie Michelini, Yasmine Belmadi, Edouard Nikitine, Josiane Stoléru, Aurélie Guichard, Antony Hegarty, Liliane Nataf and Christophe Sermet	
Wild Things 2	Jack Perez	United States	Thriller	Susan Ward, Leila Arcieri, Isaiah Washington, Linden Ashby, Anthony Denison, Joe Michael Burke, Katie Stuart, Faith Salie, Marc Macaulay, Ski Carr, Dylan Kussman, Kimberly Atkinson, Ron Dean, Adrianna Banovich and Kathy Neff	
You I Love	Olga Stolpovskaja, Dmitry Troitsky	Russia	Comedy	Damir Badmaev, Lyubov Tolkalina, Yevgeny Koryakovsky, Nina Agapova, Emanuel Michael Waganda	a.k.a. Ya lyublyu tebya
