= Engel & Joe =

2001 film by Vanessa Jopp

- Directed by: Vanessa Jopp
- Produced by: Michael Eckelt; Hieronymus Proske; Volker Stolberg
- Narrated by: Kai Hermann; Vanessa Jopp; Oliver Simon
- Cinematography: Judith Kaufmann
- Edited by: Martina Matuschewski
- Music by: Beckmann
- Release date: 25 October 2001
- Running time: 93 minutes
- Country: Germany
- Language: German

Engel & Joe is a German film directed by Vanessa Jopp which was released on 25 October 2001.

== Cast ==
- Robert Stadlober as Engel
- Jana Pallaske as Joe
- Lena Sabine Berg as Meret, Joe's mother
- Mirko Lang as Alex
- Stefanie Mühlhan as Spasti
- Nadja Bobyleva as Asi
- Heike Brentano as Social worker
