= Marlon Kittel =

German actor

- Born: Marlon Kittel; 11 December 1983 (age 42); Essen, West Germany
- Occupations: stuntman and Actor
- Years active: 1998–present

Marlon Kittel (born December 11, 1983, in Essen) is a German actor.

== Life and work ==
Marlon Kittel started working for the film industry as a stuntman for the German TV series Der Clown before he was discovered as an actor. Since 1999, he has had roles in more than a dozen movies and has made a number of appearances on German TV series, such as The Old Fox and Polizeiruf 110. His popularity increased when the 2004 movie Summer Storm came to the cinemas. Marlon played a gay character named Leo. It was the second time he had appeared in a movie with Robert Stadlober (after Play It Loud!, 2003). It was also the second time playing a gay character. His first appearance in such a role was in the short movie Freunde (The Whiz Kids, 2000). Kittel has also had roles in over 20 German television movies and shows between 2006–2013, and has been a voice actor in several audio dramas.

== Personal ==
Besides acting, Kittel plays the piano, saxophone and drums. He speaks English fluently and also has some Spanish and French abilities. He has basic knowledge of how to dance the Flamenco. He also exercises and plays ice hockey, fencing, apparatus gymnastics, handball, inline skating, karate, kick boxing, rock climbing, parkour, paddling, sailing, skiing, snowboarding, tennis, and wind surfing. In an interview in 2010, he stated that he prefers to work instead of getting welfare.

== Filmography ==
=== Short films ===
Year	Title	English Title	Role(s)
2000	Rillenfieber	Grooves Fever	Dani
2000	Freunde (The Whiz Kids; a gay short film)	The Whiz Kids; a gay short film	Marco
2007	Wilde Vögel fliegen	Wild Birds Fly	Tobi
2010	Die Fortgeworfenen	The Fort Cast	
2010	Haltlos - Losing Ground	Haltlos - Losing Ground	Boy

=== Films ===
Year	Title	English Title	Role
2000	Anna Wunder	Anna Wonder	Mickey
2002	Der Felsen	A Map of the Heart	Olaf
2002	Paule und Julia	Paule and Julia	Paule
2003	Verschwende deine Jugend	Play It Loud	Freddie
2003	Schwarzfahrt	Black Ride	
2004	Sommersturm	Summer Storm	Leo
2005	Die Bluthochzeit	The Wedding Party	Arne
2006	Der Feind im Inneren	Joy Division	Max
2009	Unter Bauern – Retter in der Nacht	Saviors in the Night	Klemens Aschoff
2009	Parkour	Parkour	Nonne
2011	Nimmersatt	Glutton	Felix
2011	Feueralarm	Fire Alarm	Thomas
2012	Gewissenskrieg	War of Conscience	Tom Rüger

=== Television Movies ===
Year	Title	English Title	Role(s)
1999	Der Sommer mit Boiler	The Summer with Boiler	
2001	Die Sitte	Sitte L	Benny
2004	Klassenfahrt – Geknutscht wird immer	The School Trip	Eric von Brückenstein
2004	Emilia - Familienbande	Emilia - Family Ties	Sebastian Steinbach
2006	Die Sturmflut	Storm Tide	Gert (uncredited)
2006	Der Untergang der Pamir	The Sinking of the Pamir	Josef Pütz
2006	Brennendes Herz	Burning Heart	Henry
2008	Die Zeit, die man Leben nennt	This Life is Yours	Felix
2008	Code 21	Code 21	*Segment: Besser Kabul
2009	Hoffnung für Kummerow	Hope for Kummerow	Alex
2013	Die Polizistin-Siggis Sommer	The Policewoman-Siggis Summer	Jürgen Beier

*He was in this segment of the movie.

=== Television series ===
Year	Title	English Title	Role(s)
1998	Der Clown	The Clown	Krüger
2001	Siska	Siska	Andrea Klein and Holger Schneller
2001	Die Kumpel	The Buddy	
2001	Der Alte	The Old Fox	Max Färber and Hansi Walter
2003	SK Kölsch		Sascha Krebs
2001-2003	Mein Leben & Ich	My Life and I	Manuel
2004	Wolffs Revier	Wolff's Turf	Simon
2004	Einmal Bulle, immer Bulle	Once a Cop, always a Cop	
2005	Ein starkes Team	A Strong Team	Lars Wittgenstein
2006	Wilsberg	Wilsberg	Sven Siegert
2003-2007	SOKO Köln	Cologne P.D.	Björn Römer and Sebastian Weber
2007	Notruf Hafenkante	Hamburg Dockland	Sören
2008	Die Familienwältin		Michael Seifert
2008	Da kommt Kalle	Here Comes Kalle	Lucas Berthold
2008	Der Bergdoktor	Mountain Medic	Tobias
2006-2008	Polizeiruf 110	Police Call 110	Bastian Kräner and Kal Menken
2008	Die Gerichtsmedizinerin	The Medical Examiner	Kai Makalowski
2008	Stolberg (Kommissar Stolberg)		Ramon Hartwig
2008-2009	Tatort		Daniel Roßhaupter and Benjamin
2009	Großstadtrevier		Torben Lüders
2009	Ihr Auftrag, Pater Castell	The Fifth Commandment	Gunnar Feld
2009	Stubbe – Von Fall zu Fall	Stubbe - from Case to Case	Hannes Trautmann
2010	Küstenwache	Coast Guard	Nick Abel
2010	Der Kriminalist	The Criminalist	Kay Franke
2010	Die Bergwacht	The Mountain Rescue	Ronnie
2011	Unsere Mütter, unsere Väter	Generation War	Joseph
2011	SOKO Leipzig	Leipzig Homicide	Thomas Vander
2012	Die Draufgänger	The Daredevil	Lars Möller
2012	Letzte Spur Berlin		Karsten Tillmann
2012	Der letzte Bulle	The Last Cop	Kevin Schmitz
2013	Doc meets Dorf	Doc Meets Dorf	Finn
2013	SOKO Wismar		Robert Brand
2013	Löwenzahn	Dandelion	Rob Kutscher (the reporter)

=== Audio Dramas ===
Year	Title	English Title	Role(s)
2006	Romeo und Giulietta	Romeo and Juliet	
2006	Märchenmarathon	Fairy Tale Marathon	
2007	Die Unruhe der Stella Federspiel	The Restlessness of Stella Federspiel	
2007	Der Heisseste Tag des Jahres	The Hottest Day of the Year	
2007	1974	1974	
2008	Die Tore der Welt	"The Gates of the World" or "World Without End"	
2008	Schnaps im Teekessel	Shot in the Kettle	
2009	Sexmonster	Sex Monster	
2009	12 Stunden Hassel	12-Hour Hassle	
2010	Krabat	Krabat	
2011	Xanadu	Xanadu	
2011	Nichts - was im Leben wichtig ist	Nothing - What is Important in Life	
2011	Angerichtet	Served	
2012	School-Shooter	School Shooter	
2012	Das sind nicht wir, das ist nur Glas	That is not Us, That is just Glass	
2013	Mord am Hindukusch	Murder in the Hindu Kush	
2013	Eine Reise ans Meer	A Trip to the Sea	

== Awards ==
Year	Film	Award	Category	Nominated or Won
2002	Paule und Julia (Paule and Julia)	International Filmfest München	Bester Nachwuchsdarsteller (Best Young Actor)	Nominated
2002	Paule und Julia (Paule and Julia)	Förderpreis Deutscher Film	Bester Nachwuchsschauspieler (Best Young Actor)	Nominated
2005	Klassenfahrt - Geknutscht wird immer (The School Trip)	Undine Award 1	Bester jugendlicher Schauspieler in einem Fernsehfilm (Best Young Actor in a Television Movie)	Nominated
2005	Summer Storm (Sommersturm)	Undine Award 2	Bester jugendlicher Nebendarsteller in einem Kinofilm (Best Young Supporting Actor in a Motion Picture)	Nominated
