= Benjamin Lebert =

German writer (born 1982)

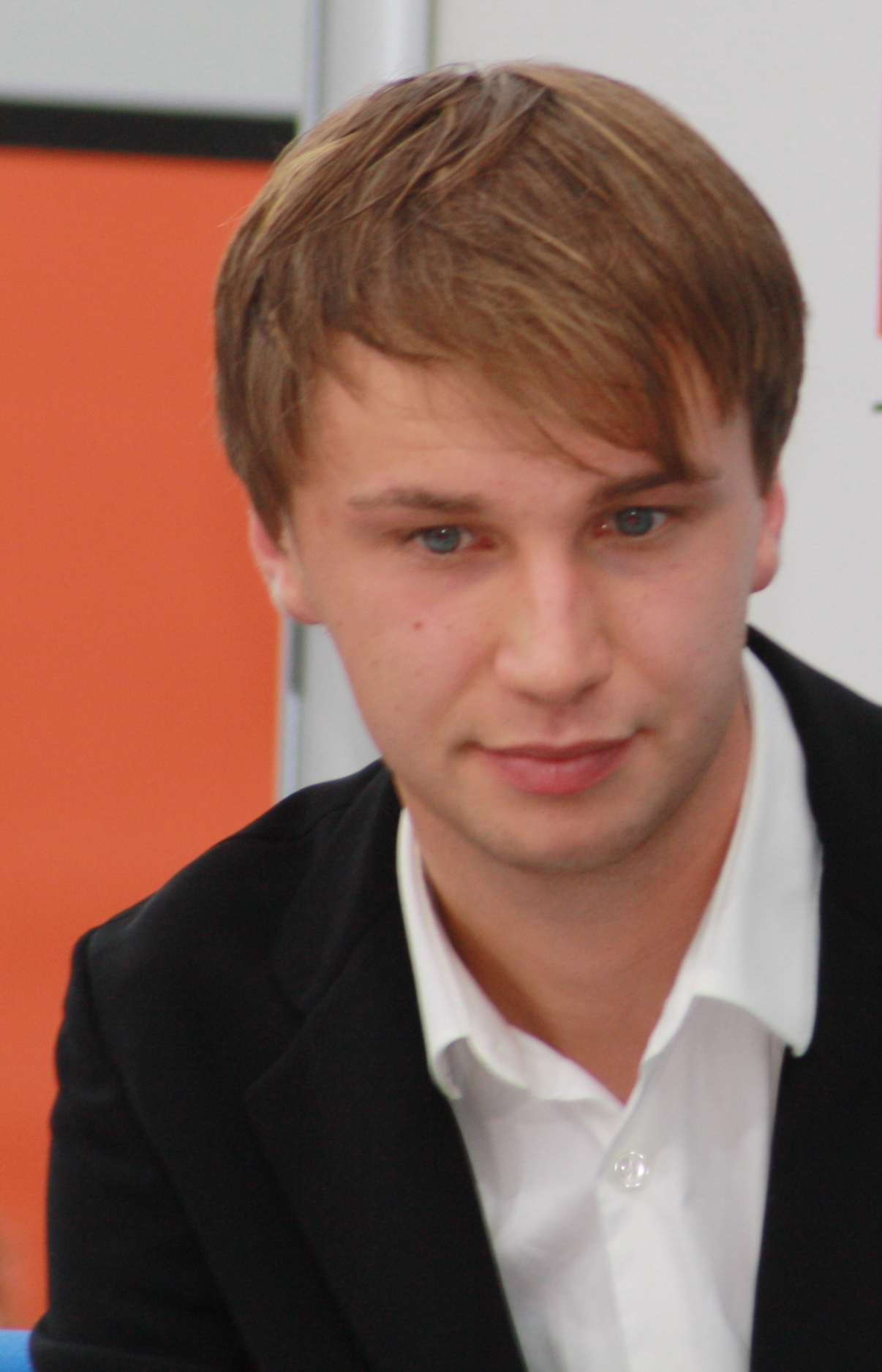
- Born: 9 January 1982 (age 44); Freiburg, West Germany
- Occupation: Writer
- Writing career
- Notable work: Crazy

Benjamin Lebert (born 9 January 1982) is a German writer. He was born in Freiburg. His first novel, Crazy, was published when Lebert was only 16 years old. The international bestseller about a handicapped teenage rebel has been licensed to 33 nations and was made into a feature film by Hans-Christian Schmid (see here), and has drawn comparisons to J.D. Salinger's Catcher in the Rye. In 2003, Lebert published a second novel, Der Vogel ist ein Rabe (The Bird Is a Raven).

Lebert lives in Hamburg.

== Background ==
Benjamin Lebert and his father were close, they bonded over the similar taste of the Rock and Roll lifestyle and music. He was influenced by American pop culture like Pink Floyd, Jekyll and Hyde (the musical), Rolling Stones, etc. In an interview with the New York Times, Lebert said his “father loves [rock and roll], has for centuries... He likes the Rolling Stones -- they're a rock group from way back.” The father and son’s love of classic rock influenced Lebert’s writing.

He first began writing journalistic articles for the young-adult supplement of the Süddeutsche Zeitung.

Lebert is partially paralyzed on the left side of his body since birth. This prevented him from performing basic tasks such as tying his shoes, using utensils, and working with his fine motor skills. When he began to write, it was based on the difficult experiences he faced every day and switching schools. Due to various academic challenges, Lebert attended several schools, including the boarding school that inspired the setting of his best-selling novel Crazy. He dropped out of school in ninth grade. After his success with the publication of the novel, he returned to school and graduated. The novel Crazy was based on his struggles while in boarding school and the friendships he made.

== Crazy. A Novel ==
The main character is also named Benjamin, nicknamed Benni. The book gets its name from one of the characters, Benni's roommate Janosch, who uses "crazy" frequently to describe events they encountered as thrilling and exciting. Benjamin’s friend group uses “crazy” as inspiration for how they want to live life. Like Lebert, Benni suffers from partial paralysis on the left side of his body and struggles achieving passing grades in school.

Lebert based his novel on his experiences attending boarding school and the people he met while there. The plot centers around Benni and his gang of friends that quickly become his family. Janosch is Benjamin’s roommate, the rest of friends include Fat Felix, Skinny Felix, Florian AKA girl, and Troy. Together the boys get into trouble and explore what it is to grow up. The novel also features Benjamin’s parents and sister. Benjamin’s mother is a doctor of alternative medicines. She protects Benjamin fiercely. Benjamin’s father is an engineer that eventually divorces his wife. He has very high expectations for Benjamin. Benjamin has a great relationship with his sister who always lets him accompany her on adventures with her lesbian friends.

This novel deals with important events such Benjamin exploring his sexuality, how he forms relationships with the other boys, how his disability impacts how he forms these relationships, and the subsequent trouble they cause together. The friends also search for life's meaning. Throughout the novel, it is evident that his friends view him as “normal,” but Benjamin constantly thinks he is not and struggles with self-esteem. In the end, he leaves the boarding school having gained some more teenage experiences and friendships.

The novel explores many adolescence-related themes e.g. teenage relationships, sexual thrives, the loss of one's virginity as well as myriad insecurities. The novel contains several parts which are often referred to as quite vulgar as for example the detailed description of how the main character Benni loses his virginity or when Benni and his classmates visit a strip club in Munich.

Stern magazine praised the novel: "No one has ever been so right-on in expressing the drama of being young. A sensation." Some critics claim the novel should not be read by teens, but should be reserved for a more mature audience that is capable of understanding the more mature themes of the novel. Other critics feel that Crazy was an accurate representation of teenage rebellion. To also quote a negative voice, a Kirkus Reviews article criticizes the generality of the characters’ adventures, and the repetition of discussions on “life, God, and sex are unfortunately both redundant and banal” The author also dismisses claims made that Crazy is similar to The Catcher and the Rye by J. D. Salinger, saying, “Salinger’s Catcher remains the gold standard. Crazy is another imitation.”

== Bibliography in English ==
- Crazy (2000), translated by Carol Brown Janeway. – New York : Knopf – 177p. ISBN 0-375-40913-0
- The Bird Is a Raven (2005), ISBN 1-4000-4284-4
- Kannst du (2006)
- Der Flug der Pelikane (2009)
- Im Winter dein Herz (2012), ISBN 978-3-455-40360-2
- Mitternachtsweg. Hoffmann und Campe, Hamburg 2014, ISBN 978-3-455-40437-1.
- Die Dunkelheit zwischen den Sternen. S. Fischer, Frankfurt am Main 2017, ISBN 978-3-10-397312-9.
