= The Raspberry Reich =

- U.S. release DVD cover art
- Directed by: Bruce LaBruce
- Written by: Bruce LaBruce
- Produced by: Jürgen Brüning
- Starring: Susanne Sachsse; Daniel Bätscher; Andreas Rupprecht; Dean Monroe; Anton Dickson; Daniel Fettig; Ulrike Schirm; Sherry Vine
- Cinematography: James Carman; Kristian Petersen
- Edited by: Jörn Hartmann
- Distributed by: Peccadillo Pictures (UK)
- Release date: 2004
- Running time: 90 minutes
- Countries: Germany; Canada
- Language: English
- Box office: $31,211

The Raspberry Reich is a 2004 film by director Bruce LaBruce which explores what LaBruce calls "terrorist chic", cult dynamics, and the "innate radical potential of homosexual expression". It is about a contemporary terrorist group who set out to continue the work of the Red Army Faction (RAF), also known as the Baader-Meinhof Gang. The group consists of several young men and a female leader named Gudrun (after Gudrun Ensslin). All of the characters are named after either original members of the Baader-Meinhof Gang or revolutionaries such as Che Guevara.

They call themselves the "Sixth Generation of the Baader-Meinhof Gang" and "The Raspberry Reich". "Reich" is a reference to communist sexologist Wilhelm Reich. In addition, the term "Raspberry Reich" was coined by RAF leader Gudrun Ensslin to refer to the oppression of consumer society. An "uncut" version of the film has been released, titled The Revolution Is My Boyfriend, edited by the gay pornographic film company Cazzo Film to include erotic scenes edited out in the original version.

== Plot ==
The core plot begins with the kidnapping of Patrick (Andreas Stitch), the son of a wealthy industrialist. Sexual and romantic entanglements push the drama forward. At the film's climax, Gudrun delivers a soliloquy on the importance of personal life in revolution. She puts particular emphasis on the breaking of heterosexual and possessive sexual norms, urging her comrades to join "The Homosexual Intifada".

The pressure of Gudrun's controlling personality causes the group to break up. Most of the urban guerrillas escape into the night. In the dénouement, the characters are visited some time later. Several have found happiness in the homosexual relationships established during their revolutionary activities. Che has become a terrorist trainer in the Middle East. Patrick escapes with Clyde, where they embark on a spree of bank robberies. This action is reminiscent of Patty Hearst's actions with the SLA. Gudrun and Holger settle down and have a child named Ulrike (after Ulrike Meinhof), whom Gudrun believes could embody the next generation of the Red Army Faction.

== Cast ==
- Susanne Sachße as Gudrun (credited as Susanne Sachsse)
- Daniel Bätscher as Holger (credited as Tim Vinzent)
- Andreas Stich as Patrick (credited as Andreas Rupprecht)
- Dean Monroe as Andreas (credited as Dean Stathis)
- Anton Z. Risan as Clyde (credited as Anton)
- Daniel Fettig as Che (credited as Damion)
- Gerrit as Helmut
- Joeffrey as Horst
- Ulrike Schirm as Neighbour 1 (credited as Ulrike S.)
- Keith Levy as Drag Queen Stage (credited as Sherry Vine)
- Stephan Dilschneider as Neighbour 2
- Pünktchen as Drag Queen Door
- Sven Reinhard as Policeman
- Genesis P-Orridge as TV Personality
- Naushad as Muslim
- Huseyin Gunus as Arab Terrorist 1 (credited as Huseyin Günus)
- Alfredo Holz as Arab Terrorist 2
- Claus Matthes as Arab Terrorist 3 / Additional Voice
- Rafael Caba as Arab Terrorist 4
- Mischka Kral as Diplomat
- Marco Volk as Chauffeur / Additional Voice
- Darius Sautter Aschkanpour as Baby
- Christoph Glaubacker as Patrick (voice)
- Andreas Stadler as Che (voice)
- Ralf Grawe as Helmut (voice)
- Mario Mentrup as Horst (voice)
- David Arnold as Additional Voice (voice)
- Daniel Hendricksen as Additional Voice (voice)

== Style ==
The film's style is propagandistic. The actors are placed in rooms wallpapered with photographs of Gudrun Ensslin, Ulrike Meinhof, Andreas Baader, and Che Guevara. This symbolises the historical connection to the RAF. At several points during the film, the action pauses while the characters recite long passages from Vaneigem's The Revolution of Everyday Life, as though they are speaking from their own thoughts. Onscreen titles are also used to convey and enhance political messages.

Pornography plays a large visual role in the film. The opening sequence features a montage of sexual acts involving the two main characters, Gudrun and Andreas. There are also plot-driven sex scenes involving the characters of Patrick and Clyde engaging in real explicit onscreen oral and anal sex acts with each other. The pornographic scenes are intended to not only arouse, but also present themes of satire and to advance character development. Dean Monroe, who played Andreas, is a longstanding gay porn star, working in the porn industry since 2000 and winning a Grabby Award in 2012.

=== Slogans ===
Slogans are used frequently to convey the politics of the Raspberry Reich. They are both an extension and parody of the slogans used by political organisations. Slogans used in the film include:

- "The Revolution is my boyfriend!"
- "Fuck me up against the wall, motherfucker!"
- "Fuck me for the Revolution!"
- "Are you revolutionary enough to give up your girlfriends?"
- "Join the homosexual intifada!"
- "No revolution without sexual revolution. No sexual revolution without homosexual revolution."
- "Out of the bedrooms into the streets!"
- "Heterosexuality is the opiate of the masses"
- Declaring things to be counter-revolutionary: "Corporate hip hop is counter-revolutionary!"; "Madonna is counter-revolutionary!"; "Cornflakes are counter-revolutionary!"; "Masturbation is counter-revolutionary!".

=== Satire ===
Humour and satire are employed to explore the gap between reality and ideals in the terrorist world. For example, some of the kidnappers—avowed vegetarians for political reasons ("meat is counter-revolutionary")—purchase burgers at a multinational corporate fast food chain drive through with their victim still in the trunk.

== Reception ==
On the review aggregator website Rotten Tomatoes, 56% of 16 critics' reviews are positive. Metacritic, which uses a weighted average, assigned the film a score of 45 out of 100, based on 5 critics, indicating "mixed or average" reviews.

Ned Martel of The New York Times rated the film 3/5 stars, describing it as "revolting and hilarious satire.".

== See also ==
- W.R.: Mysteries of the Organism, another political film which explores and relies heavily upon sexual imagery
- List of LGBT-related films of 2004
