= Cazzo Film =

German pornographic film studio based in Berlin

- Industry: Gay pornography
- Founded: 1996
- Headquarters: Berlin, Germany
- Products: Pornographic films
- Website: www.cazzofilm.com

Cazzo Film is a German pornographic film studio based in Berlin. The company has been producing gay pornographic films since 1996.

== History ==
Cazzo Film was founded in 1996 by Jörg Andreas and Jürgen Brüning, and the first film to be released was Berlin Techno Dreams. Since then, the studio has released over 80 films under the Cazzo name, and releases by specialty studios Coxxx, Prick and Spielfilme. All of these movies are released by Cazzo Film.

Andreas was the studio's co-owner and most prolific director. Brüning also directed some films for Cazzo before creating his own studio, Wurstfilm, in 2003. Among other notable directors are Bruce LaBruce, Hans Peter Hagen and Sven Jungbluth. Managing Director Felix Kamp, is Producing and Directing new “extreme hardcore” films like Berlin Kink and “fetish” film Berlin Sneakers, Berlin OMG and more

Cazzo Film has created dual versions of some of its films, one a "softcore" or theatrical version with less explicit sexual content, and another a "hardcore" or X-rated feature with a greater focus on pornographic content. LaBruce's 2006 Coxxx film The Revolution Is My Boyfriend is an X-rated continuation of his prior 2004 Peccadillo Pictures film, The Raspberry Reich. LaBruce directed both the hardcore Skingang for Cazzo as well as the softcore Skin Flick for Spielfilme in 1999 with the same storylines and actors. Andreas directed a similar pair of films, the X-rated Eingelocht (In the Hole) and the softcore Gefangen (Locked Up) in 2004. The less explicit versions of these films are intended to reach a wider audience and were shown in various film festivals around the world.

The studio releases films under the Cazzo Film label in Germany and elsewhere in Europe. In the United States, Cazzo Film has partnered with various American gay adult film companies to release their movies. All Worlds, Centaur and Raging Stallion are among the American studios who have distributed some of Cazzo's films in the U.S., although others remain unreleased in America.

"Cazzo" is the Italian vulgar term for male genitalia.

== Awards ==
Cazzo Film has won numerous awards, including a "Grabby" award for Best International Video in 2005 for Countdown. This was the American title given to Sven Jungbluth's 2004 release Thom Barron Calling by Centaur Films, who distributed the movie in the U.S. This film, which is based on Tom Tykwer's 1998 mainstream German film Lola rennt (Run Lola Run), was also nominated for six GayVN Awards. The studio has also earned multiple European Gay Porn Awards, including Best Overall Film for Fuck Fiction in 2007.

== See also ==
- List of male performers in gay porn films
- List of pornographic movie studios
- List of gay porn magazines
