= 78 Days =

- Serbian: 78 dana
- Directed by: Emilija Gašić
- Screenplay by: Emilija Gašić
- Produced by: Miloš Ivanović; Andrijana Sofranic Sucur
- Starring: Milica Gicić; Tamara Gajović; Viktorija Vasiljević; Pavle Čemerikić; Goran Bogdan; Jelena Đokić
- Cinematography: Inés Gowland
- Edited by: Jovana Filipovic
- Production company: Set Sail Films
- Release date: 29 January 2024 (IFFR)
- Running time: 82 minutes
- Country: Serbia
- Language: Serbian

78 Days (Serbian: 78 dana) is a Serbian drama film, directed by Emilija Gašić and released in 2024. The film centres on the coming of age of sisters Sonja (Milica Gicić), Dragana (Tamara Gajović) and Tijana (Viktorija Vasiljević) during the Kosovo War in 1999, whose relationship becomes disrupted when Sonja and Dragana find themselves rivals for the affections of Mladen (Pavle Čemerikić), a young man from Belgrade who has moved to town with his family.

The cast also includes Goran Bogdan as the girls' father Stefan who is drafted into military service, Jelena Đokić as their mother Nada, and Maša Ćirović as Mladen's younger sister Lela who befriends Tijana despite their older siblings' conflicts, as well as Danijel Cvetkovic, Biljana Konstantinovic, Mile Cvijovic, Ivana Simovic and Andrija Martinovic in supporting roles.

The film premiered in January 2024 at the 53rd International Film Festival Rotterdam.

== Awards ==
The film won the Glocal Images Best Film Award at the 2024 Cyprus Film Days, and both the Golden Tower for best film and the Gorki List Audience Award at the 2024 Palić European Film Festival.

At the 2024 Vancouver International Film Festival, it won the Vanguard Award.
