= Crazy (2000 film) =

- Directed by: Hans-Christian Schmid
- Written by: Hans-Christian Schmid; Michael Gutmann; Benjamin Lebert (novel)
- Starring: Robert Stadlober; Tom Schilling
- Cinematography: Sonja Rom
- Edited by: Hansjörg Weißbrich
- Music by: Kai Fischer; Christoph Kaiser
- Release date: 8 June 2000
- Running time: 97 mins
- Country: Germany
- Language: German

Crazy is a 2000 German drama film directed by Hans-Christian Schmid. It is based on the autobiographical book by Benjamin Lebert, published in 1999. The film is a drama about a 16-year-old boy named Benjamin who, after experiencing some academic problems, transfers to a boarding school in an attempt to improve his grades. When he reaches the new school, he has difficulty acclimating to his new environment along with some coming of age issues, when he falls in love with a dreamy school girl named Malen. The part of Benjamin was played by Robert Stadlober.

== Cast ==
- Robert Stadlober - Benjamin Lebert
- Tom Schilling - Janosch Schwarze
- Oona Devi Liebich - Malen
- Julia Hummer - Marie
- Can Taylanlar - Troy
- Christoph Ortmann - Kugli
- Joseph Bolz - Dünner Felix
- Willy Rachow - Florian
- Dagmar Manzel - Juliane Lebert, Benjamin's mother
- Burghart Klaußner - Klaus Lebert, Benjamin's father
- Mira Bartuschek - Paula Lebert, Benjamin's sister
- Jörg Gudzuhn - Herr Falkenstein
- Katharina Müller-Elmau - Frau Westphalen
- Karoline Herfurth - Anna
