= Jelena Đokić =

Serbian actress

- Јелена Ђокић
- Born: 24 May 1977 (age 49); Split, SR Croatia, SFR Yugoslavia
- Education: University of Montenegro
- Occupation: Actress
- Years active: 2003–present

Jelena Đokić (Serbian Cyrillic: Јелена Ђокић; born 24 May 1977) is a Serbian actress. She appeared in more than twenty films since 2003.

She was born in Split, finished elementary school in Mladenovac, high school in Herceg Novi, and the acting academy in Cetinje. She lives and works in Belgrade.

== Selected filmography ==
Year	Title	Role	Notes
2003	Loving Glances		
2004	Take a Deep Breath	Lana	
2008	The Tour		
2009	Wait for Me and I Will Not Come	Dejana	
2024	78 Days (78 dana)	Nada	
