= The Ski Trip =

- Directed by: Maurice Jamal
- Written by: Maurice Jamal
- Produced by: Ronald Hysten
- Starring: Maurice Jamal; Daren Fleming; Cassandra Cruz; John Rankin; Emanuel Xavier; Nathan Hale; Haaz Sleiman
- Production company: Indican Pictures
- Release date: October 19, 2004
- Running time: 84 minutes
- Country: United States
- Language: English

The Ski Trip is a 2004 LGBT independent romantic comedy movie written and directed by openly gay entertainer Maurice Jamal. It was released on DVD on July 11, 2006.

== Friends & Lovers: The Ski Trip 2 ==
In 2008 a sequel to the original film was released with Jamal, Fleming, Cruz, and Rankin reprising their roles. However, the sequel was never picked up by a distributor.
