= Miriam Morgenstern =

German actress and singer

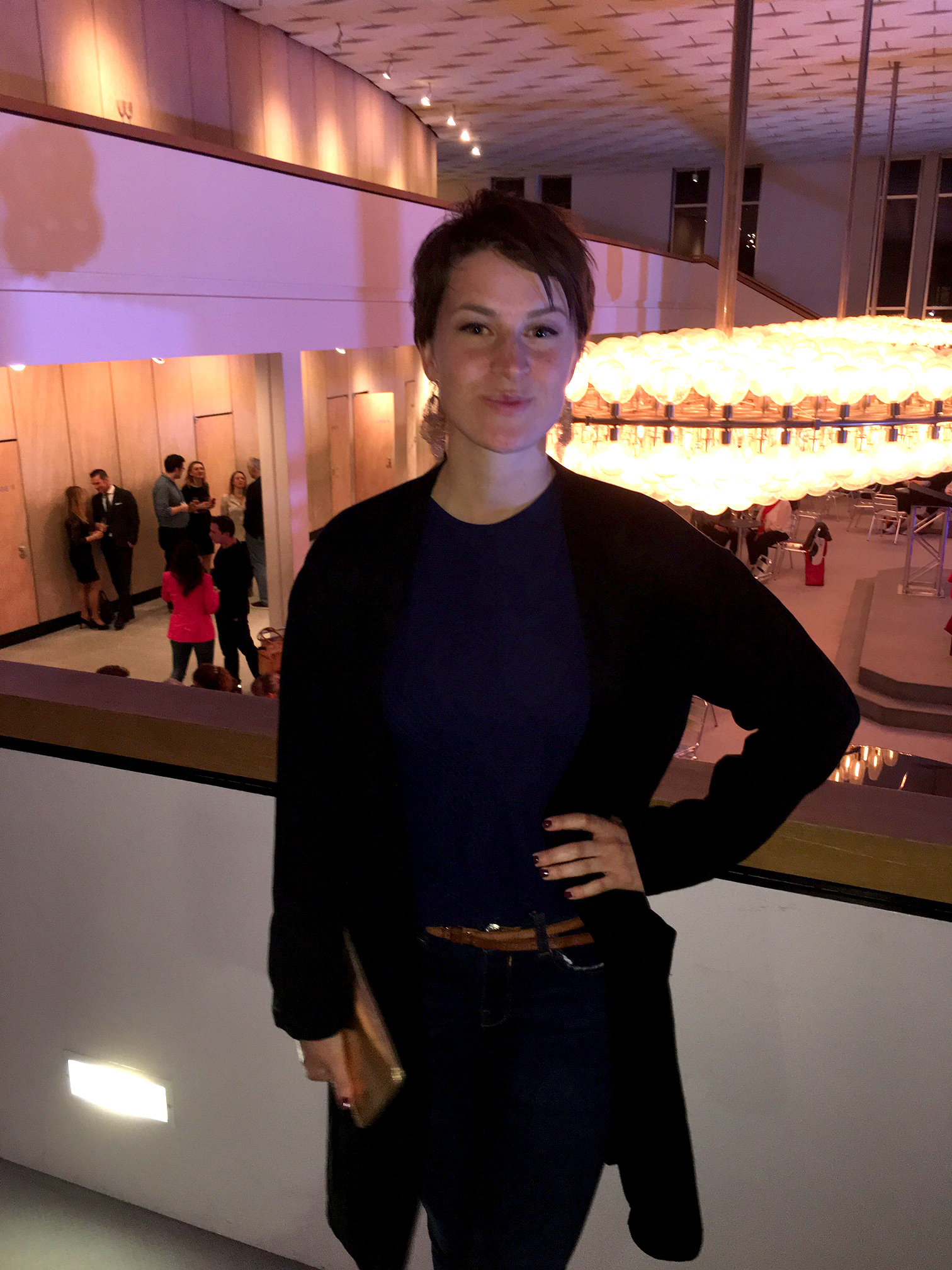
- Miriam Morgenstern in February 2017
- Born: May 20, 1987 (age 38); Gräfelfing, West Germany
- Occupations: Actress, singer

Miriam Morgenstern (born 20 May 1987) is a German actress and singer.

== Filmography ==
- 2001: Das Duo
- 2002: Family Affairs
- 2004: Summer Storm
- 2005: Weißblaue Wintergeschichten
- 2005: Kommissarin Lucas
- 2005: Nachtschicht – Der Ausbruch
- 2006: Der beste Lehrer der Welt
- 2011: Für immer 30
