= Dylan Fergus =

American actor, producer and director

- Born: Dylan John Fergus; January 4, 1980 (age 46); San Francisco, California, U.S.
- Occupations: Actor, producer, director
- Years active: 2002–present

Dylan John Fergus (born January 4, 1980, in San Francisco, California), is an American actor, producer and director. Fergus is currently an executive producer at Bloomberg Media. He is best known for his role as Noah Bennett on the daytime soap opera Passions.

== Biography ==
Prior to Passions, he briefly portrayed the role of Tim Dillon on All My Children in 2002. He also starred in 2004's Hellbent, the first gay slasher horror film.

Fergus graduated from Monta Vista High School in Cupertino, California in 1998. He studied acting at Carnegie Mellon School of Drama, graduating in 2002. In 2010, he studied film directing at the California Institute of the Arts, graduating in 2013.
