= Dmitry Troitsky =

Russian businessperson

- Born: St. Petersburg
- Education: B.A. & B.Sc
- Alma mater: Leningrad Shipbuilding Institute
- Occupation: Businessperson
- Organization: O'KEY Group

Dmitry Troitsky is a Russian businessperson and co-owns O'KEY Group (retail chain) along with his partner Dmitry Korzhev. As of per Forbes list 2011, he is the 1,140th richest person in the world and 94th richest person in Russia. Troitsky has net worth of $1.0 billion. He is a first generation entrepreneur and his wealth is self made.

== Background ==
Troitsky has obtained Bachelor of Arts & Bachelor of Science degrees from Leningrad Shipbuilding Institute. His company (O'KEY Group) was listed on London Stock Exchange in 2010 and the current market capitalization is $3.0 billion.

== History ==
Dmitry Troitsky & Dmitry Korzhev started working together as students. Their first venture was car sales that lead to formation of Mega-auto company in 1993. Mega-auto is now one of the biggest car dealers in Saint Petersburg. In 1995 Dmitry Troitsky & Dmitry Korzhev founded juice producing plant (Multon). Multon was sold to Coca-Cola after 10 years for $500 million. In 2001 they both co-founded O-Key chain of supermarkets.

== See also ==
- Forbes list of billionaires (2011)
- Business magnate
- Entrepreneur
- Billionaire
- List of countries by the number of billionaires
