= Nathan Hale Williams =

American film producer (born 1976)

- Born: 1976 (age 49–50); Chicago, Illinois
- Education: University of Illinois at Urbana–Champaign; The George Washington University Law School
- Occupations: Film producer, television producer, entertainment attorney, actor, former model

Nathan Hale Williams (born 1976) is an American film producer, television producer, entertainment attorney, actor and former model.

== Early life and education ==
Born and raised in Chicago, Illinois, Williams began appearing in regional theatrical productions, tours, commercials and television shows at the age of eight. A classically trained dancer, Williams continued to perform and study at the University of Illinois at Urbana–Champaign. After graduation, he attended The George Washington University Law School where he was the president of the Student Bar Association, a Dean’s Fellow and the recipient of the GW Law Alumni Association Award for Outstanding Scholarship and Leadership.

== Career ==
Williams is the executive producer of Dirty Laundry, which was released in theaters nationwide in December 2007. In 2008, Dirty Laundry was nominated for an NAACP Image Award and a GLAAD Award. In 2006, Dirty Laundry took the top two honors, Best Picture and Best Actor (Loretta Devine), at the American Black Film Festival. In 2004, Williams produced and starred in the award-winning film, The Ski Trip, which was Logo's first original motion picture. Currently, Nathan is in pre-production for his next feature film, Homecourt Advantage, based on the best-selling novel of the same name written by his producing partner, Crystal McCrary Anthony and Rita Ewing. Anthony and Williams adapted the screenplay and are set to shoot summer 2010.

For television, Williams is the creator and executive producer of My Model Looks Better Than Your Model, hosted by America’s Next Top Model winner Eva Marcille Pigford. As well, he is the executive producer of Leading Men and Leading Women (formerly Real Life Divas). Leading Women was nominated for a 2010 NAACP Image Award for Outstanding Television Series – News/Information. In 2009, Williams produced and directed a three-part Black History Month documentary series, INSIDE: Black Culture. He also directed and produced commercials for Isabella Fiore Handbags (starring Veronica Webb) and Jumpstart (starring LL Cool J).

As a personality/actor, Williams has appeared on Showtime's American Candidate, The Guiding Light, My Two Cents and The Bev Smith Show. He has been featured in Black Enterprise, Crain’s, Ebony, Jet, the Chicago Tribune, The Advocate, the New York Blade, Clik Magazine, Pulse!, Bleu, UneQ, the Chicago Defender and several online publications. In November 2007, Williams appeared on the cover of NEXT Magazine, which is the most widely circulated weekly LGBT publication in the world. In addition, Williams and his projects have been featured in Variety, The Hollywood Reporter, the New York Times, the LA Times, Essence Magazine, LA Weekly and HX Magazine. Williams co-stars in the Sundance Channel reality series Girls Who Like Boys Who Like Boys which debuted in December 2010. In 2016 Williams became a writer/co-director for the film 90 Days with co-director Jennia Fredrique. In 2020 Williams directed the film titled All Boys Aren't Blue.

== Bibliography ==
By Nathan Hale Williams

- Williams, Nathan w/co-author Leal, Jesus (2021). TRUE DIVERSITY: Going Beyond The Pie Graph. ISBN 978-1098360382
- Williams, Nathan w/co-author Brooks, Marion (2018). What You Don't Know Is Hurting You: 4 Keys to a Phenomenal Career. ISBN 978-1543937039
- Williams, Nathan (2017). The Girl's Best Friend: A Collection of Essays on Love, Life, & Sharing Your Light. ASIN: B077NKPXKQ
- Williams, Nathan (2015). Ladies Who Lunch & Love. ISBN 978-0692488225
- Williams, Nathan w/co-author McCrary, Crystal (2012). Inspiration: Profiles of Black Women Changing Our World. ISBN 978-1584799597

== Personal life ==
Williams is a member of various legal professional associations and a member of the board of the Harlem United Community AIDS Center. He currently resides in New York City. He is gay.
