= Tristano Casanova =

German actor (born 1983)

- Born: Tristan Alessandro Casanova; October 13, 1983 (age 41); Munich, West Germany
- Occupation: Actor

Tristano Alessandro Casanova (born 13 October 1983) is a German actor.

== Early life ==
Casanova was born in Munich to Italian and American parents.

== Filmography ==
- 1993: Himmel und Hölle
- 1994: 110 Unterwegs im Streifenwagen
- 1996: Ausflug in den Schnee
- 1996: Emmeran
- 2000: Der Runner
- 2000: Die Nacht der Engel
- 2000: Vater wider Willen
- 2001: Jenny & Co
- 2002: Verlorenes Land
- 2003: Die Stimmen
- 2003: Skifahren unter Wasser
- 2004: Sommersturm
- 2004: Stärker als der Tod
- 2005: Gefühlte Temperatur
- 2006: Liebe, Babys und ein großes Herz
