= Michael Louden =

American actor (1964–2004)

- Born: April 21, 1964; Marblehead, Massachusetts, U.S
- Died: September 4, 2004 (aged 40)
- Occupation(s): Actor, Television Host
- Years active: 1988–2004

Michael Louden (April 21, 1964 – September 4, 2004) was an American actor and television host.

== Career ==
Louden was born in Marblehead, Massachusetts and went on to become an actor. He studied theater at the University of North Carolina at Chapel Hill but graduated from Juilliard. He started as a 1988-day player on daytime soap Another World but his most notable role was Duke Kramer on As the World Turns. Duke was a moody young man who discovered his father was the volatile John Dixon (allowing Louden many scenes with theater powerhouse Larry Bryggman). Duke went on to medical school as well as a lengthy relationship with Lien Hughes, played by future ER star Ming-Na Wen. Louden played the role from 1988 to 1990 and for a brief visit in 1993.

Louden had a small part on One Life to Live in 1995 as a court reporter. Among the handful of his other film and TV appearances was a role in the 2000 film Space Cowboys. In 2003 he briefly hosted the video game show Arena on the G4 network. In Hellbent in 2004, he was a cop-loving drag queen. While working at G4, Michael became very involved with the Black Rabbit Society.

He continued to work in theater and independent film until his sudden death from a brain aneurysm.

== Filmography ==
Year	Title	Role	Notes
1988-90,1993	As the World Turns	Duke Kramer	
1989	Rude Awakening	La Fleck Model	
1995	The Langoliers	Richard Logan	2 episodes
1998	New York Undercover	Foreman	
2000	Space Cowboys	Young Pilot #1	
2000	Arli$$		1 episode
2001	Intermission	Richard	Short film
2003	Arena	Himself	Co-host
2004	Hellbent	Cop-loving drag queen	
2004	Garden of Eden	Digger	Short film
