= Hellbent (film) =

- Theatrical release poster
- Directed by: Paul Etheredge-Ouzts
- Written by: Paul Etheredge-Ouzts
- Produced by: Steven J. Wolfe; Josh Silver
- Starring: Dylan Fergus; Bryan Kirkwood; Hank Harris; Andrew Levitas; Matt Phillips; Nick Name
- Cinematography: Mark Mervis
- Edited by: Steve Dyson; Claudia Finkle
- Music by: Michael G. Shapiro
- Production company: Sneak Preview Entertainment
- Distributed by: Regent Releasing
- Release dates: June 26, 2004 (San Francisco International Lesbian and Gay Film Festival); September 16, 2005 (United States)
- Running time: 85 minutes
- Country: United States
- Language: English
- Box office: $183,066

Hellbent is a 2004 American slasher film written and directed by Paul Etheredge-Ouzts. Hellbent played the gay and lesbian film festival circuit throughout 2004 and 2005 before a limited theatrical release on September 16, 2005. The film's success helped spark a wave of similarly themed "gay slasher" films.

== Plot ==
The night before Halloween, a gay couple are making out in a car when a bare-chested killer in a devil mask appears and decapitates them with a sickle.

Halloween finds Eddie at his job as a police technician talking with his police officer sister. He distributes flyers about the murders and dresses in his father's police uniform for a Halloween costume. While distributing the flyers, he meets Jake in a tattoo shop.

Eddie meets with his friends Chaz, Joey, and Tobey, and they head for the West Hollywood Halloween Carnival. They visit the murder scene, where the devil-masked killer appears. They taunt him because they think he is cruising them.

Eddie and his friends enter the carnival, and Eddie sees Jake coming in as well. Eddie leaves to find Jake. Joey sees a man on whom he has had a crush on for weeks entering one of the dance venues. Chaz encourages Joey to talk to the man, but when he does Joey is cruelly turned down. Chaz goes to the restroom with Joey to console him, then waits for Joey outside. Chaz takes ecstasy and leaves when he sees an attractive man walk past. Joey's crush comes into the bathroom and apologizes, leaving Joey ecstatically happy. Just then, the killer emerges from a bathroom stall and decapitates Joey, taking his head as a trophy.

Chaz goes into another dance venue, where the killer catches up with him on the dance floor. In his drugged state, Chaz does not realize that the killer is slashing his torso with the scythe. The killer then decapitates Chaz while the crowd dances on (thinking it is a Halloween gag).

Tobey, drunk and angry that no one is hitting on him while he is in his Halloween drag, spots the killer, who is still carrying Joey and Chaz's heads in trick or treat bags. Tobey pursues the killer, who dismisses him. When Tobey partially removes his drag costume, the killer returns and decapitates him as well.

Eddie finally finds Jake. They go to the first dance venue but find it closed following the discovery of Joey's body. Jake climbs over a tall chain-link fence to retrieve his motorcycle, and Eddie goes after him. On his motorcycle, Jake heads for the exit to circle around and return to Eddie. The killer finds Eddie inside the closed dance venue and attacks him. Eddie locks himself in a shallow chain-link enclosure. The killer slashes at Eddie with his scythe; the tip of the blade just touches Eddie's glass eye. Jake arrives with a police officer, and the killer leaves.

Eddie and Jake give their statements at police headquarters. Jake learns that Eddie wanted to be a policeman like his father, but he had lost an eye in a training accident and having a glass eye means he cannot join the force. The two go to Eddie's place and start having sex. Jake handcuffs Eddie to his bed and searches for condoms. As Jake is returning, the killer stabs him and leaves him for dead. Eddie hears the struggle and calls out. As the killer approaches and Eddie struggles with the cuffs, Jake hits the killer from behind with a baseball bat. Eddie slips a hand out of the cuffs, tends to Jake's wound, and heads off to call an ambulance, but the killer wakes and disables the phone. Eddie runs to the kitchen. He finds a knife but also finds the heads of Joey, Chaz, and Tobey in a closet. Eddie evades the killer and retreats to his bedroom, locking Jake and himself in. As the killer chops at the door, Eddie retrieves his father's gun and some bullets. Eddie pushes Jake onto the fire escape and loads the gun. The killer breaks down the door and attacks Eddie, knocking him out the window and over the fire escape railing. As Eddie dangles from the fire escape, the killer turns toward Jake. Eddie fires the gun, grazing Jake (as Eddie lacks the stereoscopic vision and depth perception to aim well). Eddie fires again, hitting the killer in the forehead.

Jake is taken to the hospital in an ambulance, and Eddie promises to be there when he wakes up. Eddie's sister gloats over the fallen killer, but Eddie realizes the man is still alive. In the final moment, the killer opens his eyes and grins hideously, disclosing that he has Eddie's artificial eye clenched between his teeth.

== Cast ==
- Dylan Fergus as Eddie
- Bryan Kirkwood as Jake
- Hank Harris as Joey
- Andrew Levitas as Chaz
- Matt Phillips as Tobey
- Kent Bradley James as Nick Name
- Nina Landey as Maria
- Samuel Aarons as Mikey
- Kris Andersson as White Pepper
- Shaun Benjamin as police officer
- Baron Rogers as Jared Reynolds
- Miguel Caballero as Jorge
- Blake Davis as frat guy
- Jerry Farmer as tattoo artist
- Rafael Feldman as Jared's friend
- Yan Feldman as Jared's friend #2
- Jazzmun as Black Pepper
- Jamila Jones as waitress
- "Texas" Terri Laird as tattoo shop woman
- Dionne Lea as Dog Owner
- Paul Lekakis as billboard admirer
- Michael Louden as cop-loving drag queen
- Ryan McTavish as fireman
- John Petrelli as leatherman
- Joe Sabatino as office cop
- Stanton Schnepp as EMT guy
- Nick Collins as super bitch drag queen
- Danny Seckel as Top hat
- Rachel Sterling as girl in car
- Eric Stiles as boy in car
- Colton Ford as Nickname band member (uncredited)

== Production ==
=== Conception ===
I wasn't casting these characters (and their issues) as representatives of the gay community at large. In the traditional slasher movie, murder is portrayed as punishment—often for premarital sex. In Hellbent, I didn't want the audience to equate gay sex with death (premarital sex is all we gays have). Instead, I opted to give each of the characters a specific fatal flaw that my killer exploits: use of sense-deadening recreational drugs, addiction to attention, flight-instinct overwhelmed by romantic bliss. I certainly don't judge their behavior—they're just kids, after all. No one's getting punished for their human failings, in my mind.

— Writer-director Paul Etheredge-Ouzts on his approach to the character in Hellbent

About 2000, executive producers Michael Roth (Circuit), Joseph Wolf (Fade to Black, Hell Night, Halloween II, Halloween III: Season of the Witch), and Karen Lee Wolf (Children of the Living Dead) conceived the idea of a serial killer horror film featuring homosexual characters. They had a concept involving Halloween, a masked murderer, and the use of West Hollywood, California, as the location in mind. Paul Etheredge-Ouzts, an art director who had worked with Roth on two films, was working in the trio's production office. After reading a portion of a romantic comedy script Etheredge-Ouzts had written, the producers asked him to write and direct their gay-themed horror film. It was to be a micro budget picture with a minimal advertising budget.

Etheredge-Ouzts had never written a complete script before, nor had he directed a film. To prepare to write the script, Etheredge-Ouzts viewed as many horror films from the 1980s as he could locate. From these, he identified a film structure and stock character types ("the final girl", "the ingénue", "the slut", "the tough guy"), turning each type into a gay version of the heterosexual trope. Rather than write characters who are LGBT stereotypes or whose sexuality is their critical, defining personality trait, Etheredge-Ouzts wrote characters whose sexuality appeared incidental to them. "The young men in Hellbent have moved beyond worrying about whether 'it's ok to be gay' or not," he later said.

Etheredge-Ouzts kept the killer as anonymous as possible. He wanted the audience to project their fears onto the murderer, assigning a motive and background to him themselves. Adding details seemed to rob the character of menace, he felt. This approach led Etheredge-Ouzts to cut the killer's lines from the film, as he worried that a portion of the audience would not find whichever voice was used to be frightening.

He began working on a visual style for the film which would help disguise its low budget. The 1959 Brazilian-French film Black Orpheus was an initial guide, with the work of photographers James Bidgood and Pierre et Gilles and the 1953 science fiction film Invaders from Mars providing later inspiration. (Note: The wooded location where the first murder occurs in the film was specifically chosen because it had a slight hill with a wooden fence beside it, which was remarkably similar to a key location seen repeatedly in Invaders From Mars.) He also worked closely with production designer Matthew Flood Ferguson and cinematographer Mark Mervis to work out how to capture the "surreal, carnival atmosphere of Halloween".

=== Second unit footage and music ===
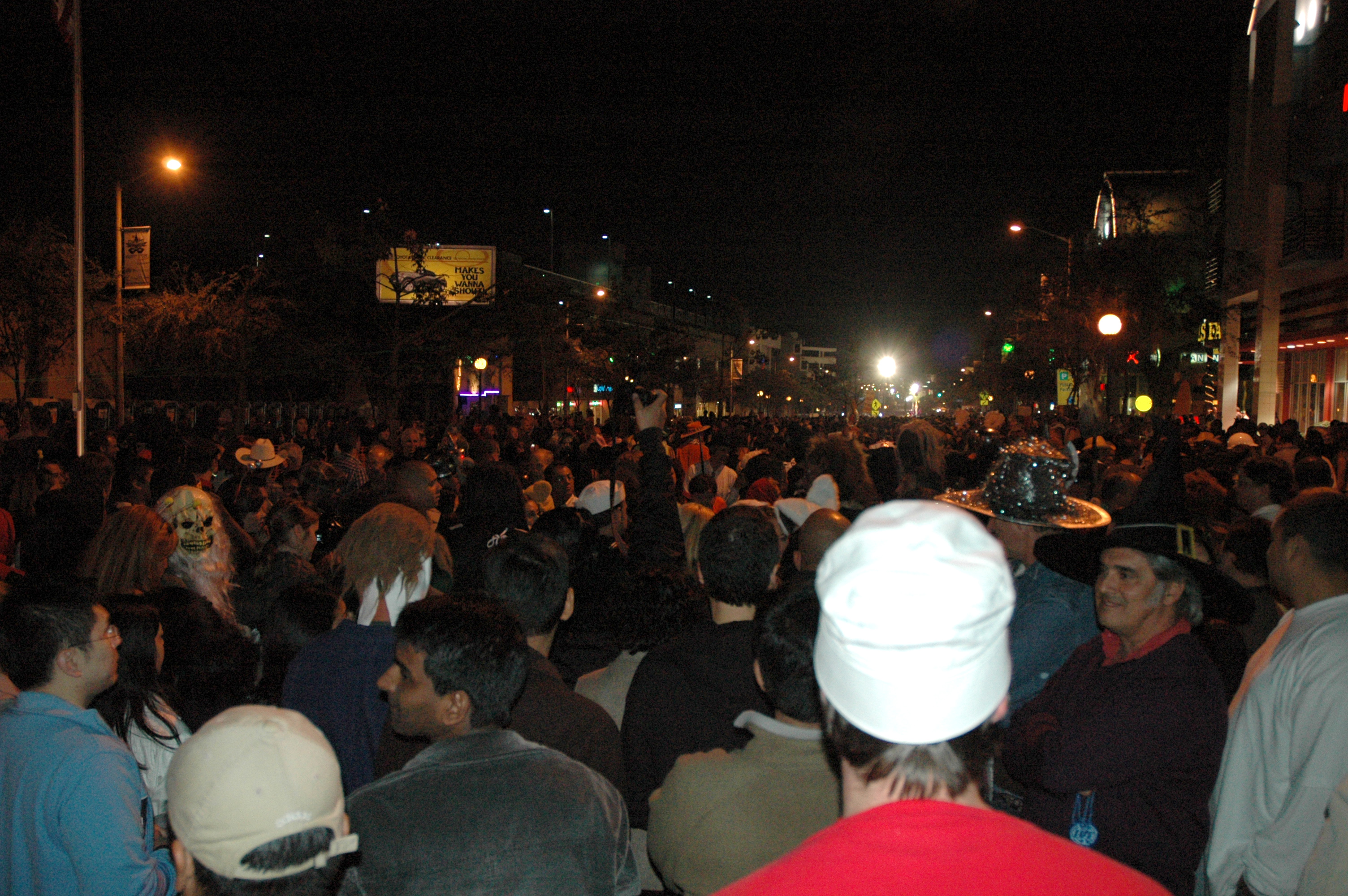
Throng at the entrance to the West Hollywood Halloween Carnival in 2006. The Hellbent film crew shot extensive footage at this event in 2001.

Second unit filming on Hellbent began in October 2001. Etheredge-Ouzts only had a concept for the film and no script yet, but had already decided he did not want to use stock footage in the motion picture. The second unit was sent to the 2001 West Hollywood Halloween Carnival to "shoot anything cool." Although six hours of footage was shot, less than two minutes of it appear in the film.

As Etheredge-Ouzts and music supervisor John Norris began planning the music for the film, Etheredge-Ouzts read an article about the queercore (gay punk music) scene in Los Angeles. The article mentioned queercore band Nick Name and the Normals, and Etheredge-Ouzts contacted Name to see if he would be interested in writing music for the film. Working with Name helped Etheredge-Ouzts to further define the motion picture's aesthetics, characters, and themes. At some point, Name, who had been an Abercrombie & Fitch model, was asked to play the serial killer in the film, and he agreed. Through Name, Etheredge-Ouzts came to know Texas Terri, whom he cast as the tattoo artist. Only later did Etheredge-Ouzts discover that Texas Terri was a punk rock musician and singer, after which he asked her to contribute to the soundtrack as well.

=== Script and casting ===
The script was finished some time in early to mid 2002. Live filming occurred on Santa Monica Boulevard in West Hollywood, and a wooded location in Los Angeles was used as the scene of the first crime. Several sets were built to depict the carnival and streets. Several scenes were filmed in Los Angeles buildings (including a local church used as 'The Meatlocker') redressed to look like carnival venues.

Casting occurred shortly before principal photography began. Etheredge-Ouzts sought a racially diverse cast of handsome men who were "regular guys" who didn't "play gay". Because the shooting schedule was so tight, actors were cast who did not require rehearsal time. Casting concluded two days before principal photography began, leaving just enough time to costume the actors. Although the lead character, Eddie, was intended to be Latino, none of the other characters had been written with an ethnicity in mind. However, only a small number of racial and ethnic minority actors auditioned for the film, and none of them had the requisite acting skills. At one point, Etheredge-Ouzts claimed, 30 non-white actors were scheduled to audition and none of them showed up. This left the production with an all-white cast. The director attributed the lack of interest by minority actor to an unwillingness to play a gay character. Dylan Fergus was cast just two days before principal photography began. Although unhappy with Fergus' haircut, the production team decided against cutting his hair. If the haircut didn't turn out right, there was no time for his hair to grow back.

=== Principal photography and title ===
Principal photography occurred in October 2002, and involved a cast and crew of about 30 individuals. The shoot occurred without any major incidents. None of the main cast, all of whom were heterosexual, had any problems with portraying gay characters, or engaging in same-sex kissing or sex-play. Actor Dylan Fergus ("Eddie") found it difficult to kiss co-star Bryan Kirkwood ("Jake") at the end of the day due to Kirkwood's five o'clock shadow, and actor Matt Phillips ("Tobey") fell several times while wearing high-heeled footwear.

Etheredge-Ouzts had never been able to devise an appropriate title for the film by the end of 2002. The producers proposed holding an online contest to allow the public to name the film (sight unseen). The contest began running in September 2003. Etheredge-Ouzts was dismayed to discover that most of the suggestions were very poor; many were sexually inappropriate, some far too campy, and others too topical (which meant they would not stand the test of time). Among the suggestions received were Boy Meets Knife, Queer Eye for the Dead Guy, and 28 Gays Later. Among the final eight submissions received on the final day of the contest was the title Hellbent. Etheredge-Ouzts chose Hellbent for the title because it was aggressive and simple, as well as a play on words (referring both to the devil-masked killer and the "bent" [e.g., gay] victims). The title was also flexible, in that it could refer to the killer, the victims' recklessness, or the fast pacing of the picture.

=== Soundtrack ===
Hellbent features original as well as licensed songs by queercore bands Nick Name and the Normals, Best Revenge, Pansy Division, and Three Dollar Bill. The music has been described as "equal doses of club tracks and Korn-style nu metal."

== Release ==
=== Theatrical release ===
Hellbent screened at about 30 LGBTQ film festivals in the United States between June 2004 and April 2006. It was commercially released in 39 theaters, largely small or independent cinemas, on September 16, 2005, grossing $183,066 ($301,783 in 2025 dollars) domestically. Initially marketed as a "gay slasher film", Hellbent was later marketed as a "queer slasher film" to emphasize its groundbreaking nature. The Hellbent advertising campaign also claimed the motion picture was the "first" gay slasher film. However, this is not an accurate claim, as the gay slasher films Make a Wish (2002), Dead Guys (2003), and High Tension (2003) all preceded it.

The film's success and popularity spawned a number of similarly themed motion pictures, creating a new genre of film called "queer horror".

=== Home video release ===
Hellbent was released as a Region 1 DVD on September 1, 2006. It has also been released in Region 2. A Region 4 DVD was issued on February 27, 2007.

== Critical reception ==
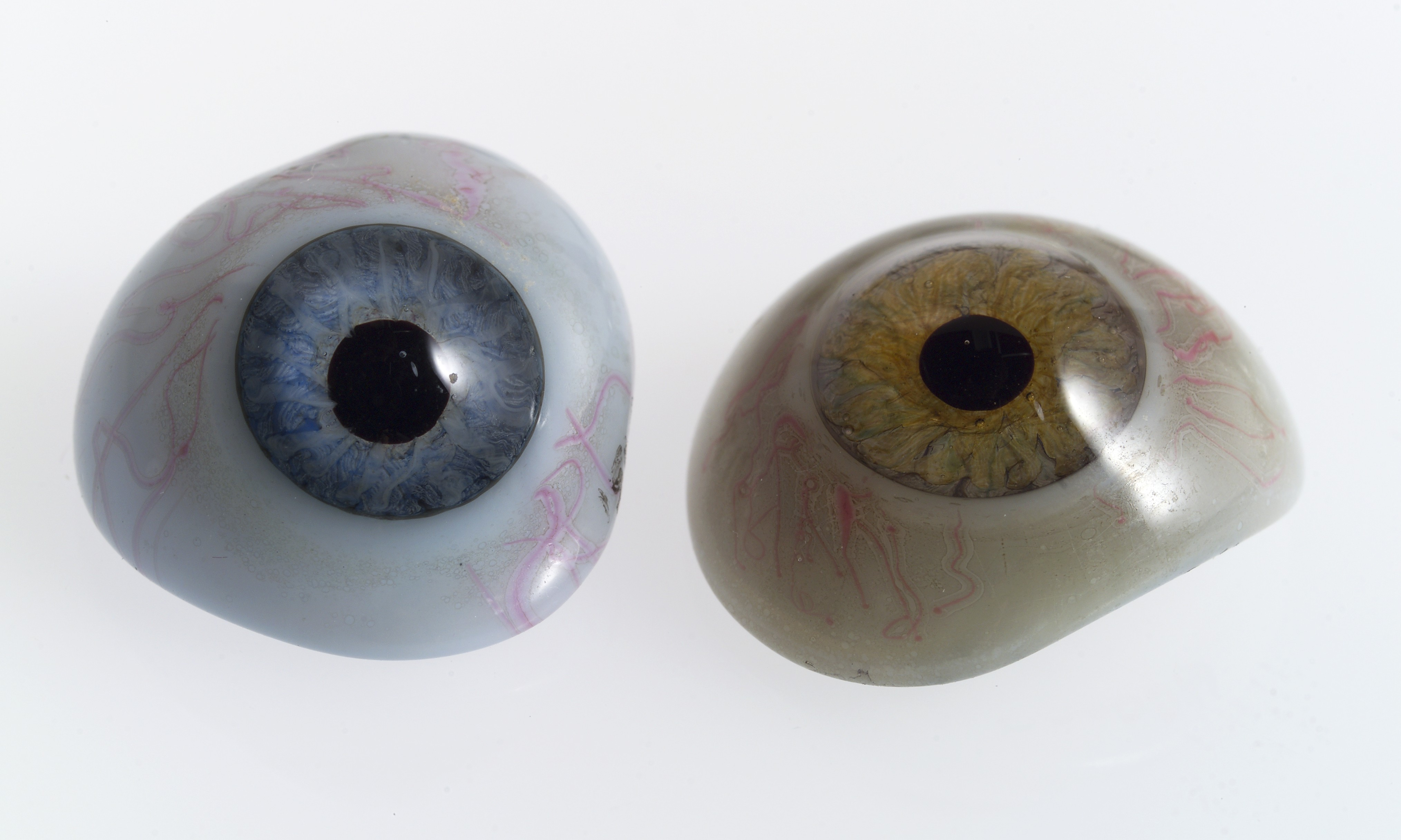
One reviewer found the serial killer's fetishization of the hero's glass eye funny and intriguing.

Reviews for Hellbent were mixed. Rotten Tomatoes gives the film a score of 49% based on reviews from 43 critics, with an average rating of 5.5/10. The site's consensus reads: "Hellbent is proof that gay slasher films can be just as tedious and mediocre as straight ones". Dennis Harvey, writing in Variety, called it a "straight-ahead slasher pic" that was "fun—if minor horror fun—[and] ably handled by first-time feature helmer Paul Etheredge-Ouzts." Harvey found the film mostly formulaic, but did enjoy the finale. Laura Kern of The New York Times called the film "amusing" and "watchable". Reviewer Ed Gonzalez at Slant Magazine called the picture "better than most films of its ilk", and praised the death scenes—which he called "some of the juiciest and most convincing decapitation sequences since Argento's Trauma". Writing for IndieWire, critic Michael Koresky found the film lacking in nuance, "more efficient than innovative", and even somewhat stale, yet said it was pleasurable and gleeful and managed to catch the audience's attention. Peter Hartlaub was more critical of the film in his review, concluding that Hellbent was not smart, not scary, and numbingly predictable. In contrast, The Seattle Times film reviewer Jeff Shannon thought the film novel and praised it for returning to the simple tropes of early horror films. He enjoyed the combination of gore and humor, although Hartlaub did not find that the humor redeemed the film.

Although critic Dennis Harvey found the script full of plot holes, they were no more so than in the average slasher film. He criticized the main character of Eddie as bland, but had good words for Andrew Levitas' performance as the hedonistic Chaz. Laura Kern found the dialogue corny, but had very positive words for the way each character was brought to life (which, she felt, made it all the more difficult to watch each person die). Critics Jeff Shannon and Peter Hartlaub also found the characters well-developed, and Hartlaub thought the performances by Dylan Fergus and Matt Phillips were the best in the film. Chicago Tribune film critic Michael Wilmington similarly enjoyed the way the film presented the audience with various stereotypes (drag queen, leatherman, sex addict) and then killed them off, leaving the most fully realized character alive.

Reviewer Laura Kern called the decision to reveal little about the killer "a smart one." Jeff Shannon was more ambivalent, but thought the murderer's fetishization of Eddie's artificial eye funny and intriguing. Critic Michael Koresky, however, was more equivocal, calling this element of the film both its greatest strength and its most nagging weakness.

Critic Ed Gonzalez enjoyed what he called the script's "frank expressions of frustrated gay identity." He had praise for the way the film used Eddie's "bad eye" as a motif for his sexual insecurities, self-obsession, and emotional damage. He described it as a "uniquely perverse obsession with disability." Film scholar Claire Sisco King was more mixed in her appraisal, arguing that the film had a marked ambivalence homosexual identity. By rejecting certain LGBT stereotypes (like the "flaming queen"), the motion picture limits "how gay" is acceptable, undercutting its claim to be "queer" (e.g., radical and non-normative) and reinforcing heteronormative ideas about masculinity. (Note: King cites as an example the Tobey character's story arc. Tobey is a handsome, athletic, well-endowed underwear model who has tired of being sexually objectified. He dresses in drag in an attempt to find someone interested in him as a person, not his body. King points out that, when the serial killer shows no interest in him, Tobey tells the killer that he's actually handsome and masculine. This serves to undercut Tobey's desire to be loved for himself. Moreover, it is only after Tobey removes his wig that the killer shows interest in him. King claims that this "attempt to blur gender boundaries" is now seen as "a regrettable (and dangerous) mistake"—"valorizing masculinist identity formations and punishing those that fall outside this narrow framework.") Although writer-director Paul Etheredge-Ouzts sought to avoid the typical slasher film trope of punishing the sexually active, King concludes that he did just the opposite: the sexually inhibited Eddie repeatedly tells his friends not to have sex. The sexually active friends all die, and Eddie (whose sole attempt to have sex in the film is interrupted before it begins) survives. Reviewer Jeff Shannon disagreed, arguing that the flair and humor with which the killings occur avoided the "sex-equals-death" trope of most horror films. He pointed to the death-throes of Chaz's headless body, which he said received the biggest laugh from the audience at his screening.

The production design and cinematography also won some praise from critics. Claire Sisco King called the use of real footage unconventional and disruptive in a positive way. The editing was described as akin to that of a music video, and critic Laura Kern found it effectively paced. Michael Koresky described Joey's death scene in the red-drenched bathroom very effectively staged, although Peter Hartlaub found that the lighting obscured the action rather than enhancing it. Except for the strobe light effects during Chaz's death and the moment when the killer's scythe touches Eddie's glass eye, Kern found the special effects only average.

Albert Nowicki included the film on his list of "best Halloween movies of all time" for Prime Movies.
