= Ludwig Blochberger =

German actor (born 1982)

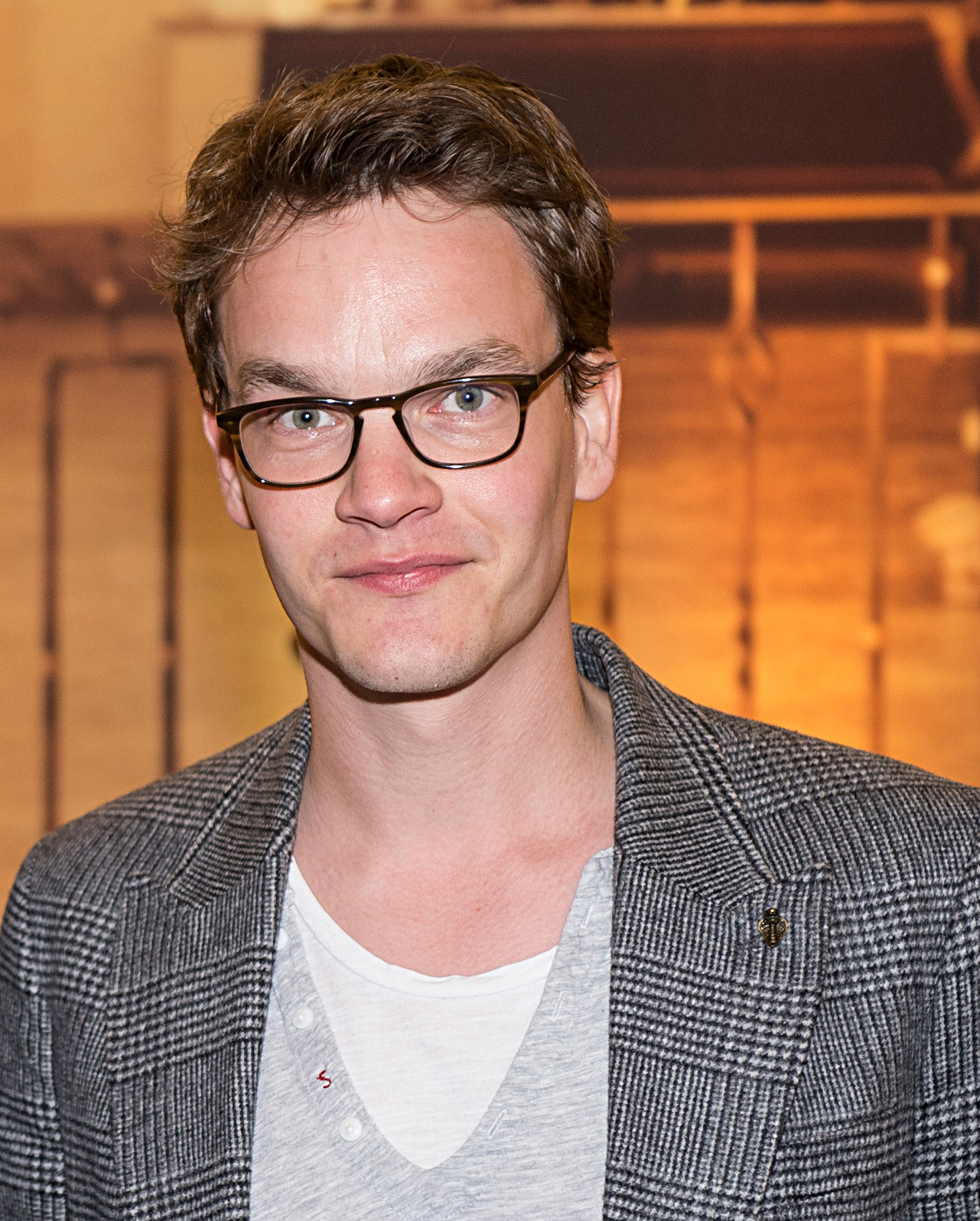
- Ludwig Blochberger in 2014
- Born: 3 December 1982 (age 43); East Berlin, East Germany
- Education: Ernst Busch Academy of Dramatic Arts
- Occupation: Actor

Ludwig Blochberger (born 3 December 1982) is a German actor. He is best known for his appearance in the coming of age movie Summer Storm dealing with issues around sexual orientation. He also appeared on German TV drama programmes including The Old Fox, Tatort and Brittany Mystery. Furthermore he portrayed the Chancellor Helmut Schmidt, in the TV documentary drama Helmut Schmidt - Lebensfragen.

== Early life ==
Ludwig Blochberger was born in 1982 in East Berlin. His father Lutz Blochberger (an actor and director) and his mother Gitta Blochberger (a puppeteer) studied at this time at the Ernst Busch Academy of Dramatic Arts in Berlin. In 1984, the family moved to Dresden, due to the theater engagements of the two parents. In 1990, Ludwig attended the Kreuzschule in Dresden for one year. Then in 1992 they moved to Vienna, and he stayed with the Vienna Boys' Choir until 1995. With this famous Austrian boys choir, he got to know the world early via the joint concert tours (Japan, Australia, USA). In 1995, he had his first theater appearance, he participated in the open air theater in Chur (in Switzerland) in the theater production of Woyzeck. Then he could continue with other performances at the Vienna Burgtheater, among other things, he played Prince Edward III in the production of Edward II, directed by Claus Peymann. In 1999, Ludwig returned to his native Berlin and in 2000, he starred in the multi-award-winning TV three-part mini-series The Manns - Novel of a Century, as the role of 'Klaus Heuser', alongside actor Armin Mueller-Stahl. In the same year, he ended his school career and one year later began his acting studies at the Ernst Busch Academy of Dramatic Arts.

While still a drama student, he was in the cinema production of Summer Storm (directed by Marco Kreuzpaintner) and also in the 2006 Oscar-winning film The Lives of Others (directed by Florian Henckel von Donnersmarck). Then in the TV movie Der Vater meiner Schwester, (directed by Christoph Stark), a family drama in which Ludwig starred together with Katharina Schüttler and Christian Berkel, which premiered at the Munich Film Festival and earned him an Undine Award nomination for Best Young Actor (TV). In 2005, he completed his acting training and worked in three episodes of Tatort, among others, he played a leading role as directed by Niki Stein. In the movie The Last Train (directed by Joseph Vilsmaier & Dana Vávrová), he played the unscrupulous SS Obersturmführer Crewes, who escorted one of the last deportation trains to Auschwitz.

Among his most important theatrical works to date include the productions of director Hans Neuenfels, who in 2005 brought him to Bochum for his world premiere of Schumann, Schubert und der Schnee, an "opera for piano" at the Ruhrtriennale (arts festival in Ruhr). Ludwig played the role of Franz Schubert alongside the baritone singer Olaf Bär in this fictional encounter between the two musical geniuses. For this production, there is also a 60-minute film documentary by director Enrique Sánchez Lansch Sound of the Ruhr. In 2007, Neuenfels cast him in the title role of Baal, written by Bertolt Brecht, at the Münchner Volkstheater. In the same year Ludwig also played for the first time under the direction of his father Lutz Blochberger, in the main role in the world premiere of the tragicomedy Heil Hitler!, by the playwright Rolf Hochhuth at the Academy of Arts, Berlin.

In 2013 Italien film director Liliana Cavani cast him as Pope Innocent III in her film adaptation “Francesco” (2013). Furthermore he portrayed the former German Chancellor Helmut Schmidt in the TV documentary drama “Helmut Schmidt - Questions of Life” directed by Ben von Grafenstein. From 2013 to 2015 Blochberger starred as Riwal in the German crime series “Inspector Dupin” based on the novels by author Jean-Luc Bannalec which were filmed in Brittany (France). From 2015 to 2021 he then starred in the crime series “The Old Fox” as commissioner Tom Kupfer. In “The End of Dreams” (2023) directed by Olga Chajdas he was playing the commandant of the Auschwitz concentration camp, Rudolf Höss. The docudrama series was filmed at the original location in Poland. Since 2024 he is performing a solo concert reading of “The Book of Those Killed by Neil Young” by Navid Kermani where he sings and plays songs by Neil Young live on guitar.

== Personal life ==
Ludwig Blochberger is father of a Portuguese-German son, born in 2021. He is a three time Berlin Marathon finisher.

== Filmography ==
=== Film ===
Year	Title	Director	Role	Notes
2001	Mein lieber Herr Gesangsverein	Marcel Neudeck	Alexander	(Short)
2004	Summer Storm	Marco Kreuzpaintner	Oli	
2006	The Lives of Others	Florian Henckel von Donnersmark	Benedikt Lehmann	
2006	The Last Train	Joseph Vilsmaier, Dana Vávrová	Crewes	
2008	The Reader	Stephen Daldry	Seminar Group Student	
2008	The Anarchist's Wife	Marie Noëlle, Peter Sehr	Luis (voice)	
2009	Effi Briest	Hermine Huntgeburth	Nienkerken	
2009	21:37	Michal Ostatkiewicz	Werberegisseur	
2012	Endspiel - Das Ende des Theaters	Robert Besta	Marco	(Short)
2013	Abbitte eines Mörders	Julian Cohn	Pater	(Short)
2019	A Gschicht über d'Lieb	Peter Evers	Thomas	

=== Television ===
Year	Title	Role	Notes
1998	Wie eine schwarze Möwe	Carl Theodor	(TV Movie)
2001	The Manns - Novel of a Century	Klaus Heuser	(TV Mini-Series)
2002	Liebling, bring die Hühner ins Bett	Kai Teuffel	(TV Movie)
2002	Dr. Sommerfeld – Neues vom Bülowbogen	Hajo Henisch	TV series, 1 episode
2003	Wolff's Turf	Jakob Zinner	TV series, 1 episode
2003	Tage des Sturms	Jugendlicher	(TV Movie)
2003	Die Stimmen	Heiko Adler	(TV Movie)
2003	Die Cleveren	Frank Walberg	TV series, 1 episode
2004	Die Konferenz	Victor Leysen	(TV Movie)
2004	Die Versuchung	Matthias Brendel	(TV Movie)
2005	Die Wache	Mark	TV series, 1 episode
2005	Der Vater meiner Schwester	Paul Schneider	(TV Movie)
2005	Die letzte Schlacht	Hannes Schachelhuber	(TV Movie)
2005 - 2006	Arme Millionäre	Hartwig von Thurnberg	TV series, 3 episodes
2005 - 2012	Tatort	Alexander Kern (2005)/ Lukas Eckermann (2005)/ Manuel Dettmer (2006)/ Sebastian Lesniak (2012)	TV series, 4 episodes
2005 - 2013	Leipzig Homicide	Bernd Michels (2005)/ Torsten Flimm (2013)	TV series, 2 episodes
2006	Schumann, Schubert und der Schnee ('Schumann, Schubert and the Snow')	Franz Schubert	(TV Movie)
2006 - 2014	SOKO Wismar	Pepe Passlack (2006)/ Pfleger Michael (2014)	TV series, 2 episodes
2006 - 2019	Cologne P.D.	Holger Meyer (2006)/ Dietmar Reichenbach (2011)/ David Becker (2019)	TV series, 3 episodes
2007	Die Todesautomatik	FDJ-Funktionär	(TV Movie)
2007	Alarm für Cobra 11 - Die Autobahnpolizei	Billy the Kid	TV series, 1 episode
2007 - 2017	Vienna Crime Squad	Ben Steiner (2007)/ Johannes Ebner (2017)	TV series, 2 episodes
2008	Stolberg	Eddi von Westhofen	TV series, 1 episode
2008	Notruf Hafenkante	Christoph Wagner	TV series, 1 episode
2008	Der Kriminalist	Lars Wolkenhaar	TV series, 1 episode
2008	Küstenwache	Hannes Börnsen	TV series, 1 episode
2008-2018	The Old Fox	Matthias Holt (2008)/ Moritz Fuchs (2010)/ Fabian Ferencz (2014)/ (Tom Kupfer 2015-2018)	TV series, 27 episodes
2009	Liebling, weck die Hühner auf	Kai Teuffel	(TV Movie)
2009	Polizeiruf 110	Hagen Dietrich	TV series, 1 episode
2009	Der Raketenmann - Wernher von Braun und der Traum vom Mond	Wernher von Braun 1928-1945	(TV Movie documentary)
2009	Ein geheimnisvoller Sommer	Paul	(TV Movie)
2009	Ein starkes Team	Armin	TV series, 1 episode
2009 - 2014	SOKO Kitzbühel	Flo Hacker (2009)/ Moritz Nowak (2014)	TV series, 2 episodes
2010	Until Nothing Remains	Chris	(TV Movie)
2011	Der Staatsanwalt	Boris Glatt	TV series, 1 episode
2011	Tango	Jens	(TV Short)
2011	Nord Nord Mord	Claus Niebecker	TV series, 1 episode
2011	Danni Lowinski	Burkhard Adam	TV series, 1 episode
2011	Doctor's Diary	Johannes Minze	TV series, 1 episode
2012	Ein Fall für zwei	Felix Lessing	TV series, 1 episode
2012	Lena Fauch	Max Trautenwolf	TV series, 1 episode
2012	Spreewaldkrimi	René Müller	TV series, 1 episode
2012	Die Chefin	Florian Koch	TV series, 1 episode
2013	Helmut Schmidt - Lebensfragen	Helmut Schmidt (aged 23–35)	(TV Movie)
2013	Stuttgart Homicide	Alexander Konrad	TV series, 1 episode
2013	Bloch	Lukas Rudolf	TV series, 1 episode
2013	Letzte Spur Berlin	Tom Zielke	TV series, 1 episode
2013	Generation War	Freitag	TV Mini-series, 1 episode
2013	Mein Kampf mit Hitler - 'Machtergreifung' 1933	Sebastian Haffner	(TV Movie)
2014	Francesco	Papa Innocenzo III	(TV Movie)
2014	Murder by the Lake	Jonas Zimmermann	TV series, 1 episode
2014 - 2018	Commissaire Dupin	Inspector Riwal	TV series, 5 episodes
2015	Kommissarin Heller	Maik Voigt	TV series, 1 episode
2016	Hidden Identity	David Wendt	(TV Movie)
2017	München Mord - Auf der Straße, nachts, allein	Lukas Finke	(TV Movie)
2017	Die Spezialisten - Im Namen der Opfer	Frank Singer	TV series, 1 episode
2018	Commissaire Dupin	Inspector Riwal	(TV Movie)
