= Dixie Longate =

American drag queen

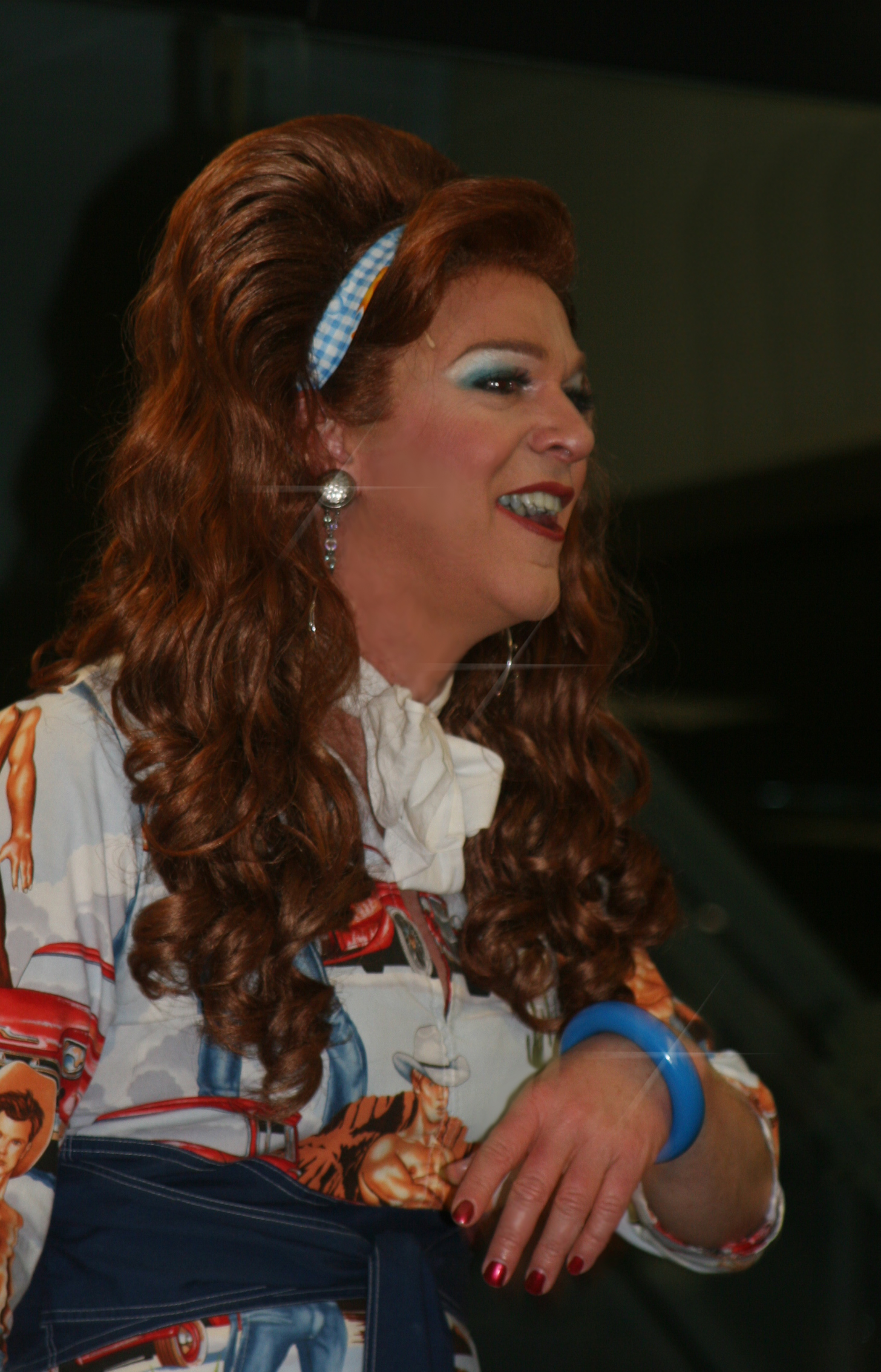
- Dixie Longate at the Thousand Oaks Civic Arts Plaza in Thousand Oaks, California in February of 2020 following her performance of "Dixie's Tube Top"
- Born: 1969 (age 56–57); Ohio, USA
- Other name: Kris Andersson
- Occupations: Writer; performer; Tupperware sales representative
- Years active: 2004-present
- Notable work: Dixie's Tupperware Party
- Website: http://www.dixiestupperwareparty.com/about/

Dixie Longate is the drag persona of American actor, writer, comedian, and drag performer Kris Andersson who, since 2006 has been performing a solo act called Dixie's Tupperware Party in five countries while engaging with her audience to sell actual Tupperware products.

Andersson's role as "Dixie" began as a dare in 2004 from a friend to sell Tupperware while in drag. Andersson accepted the challenge, and went on to become Tupperware's number one sales representative in both the United States and Canada while developing the show. In 2007 Andersson participated in a three-month residency at New York's Ars Nova theater to further develop his work and his character, and in 2008 was nominated for a Drama Desk Award for Outstanding Solo Performance.

Andersson also has appeared on TV series and films such as Hellbent in 2004 as 'White Pepper'.

== Filmography ==
=== Film ===
Year	Title	Role	Notes
1997	Titanic	Dancer	
1997	Scream 2	Dancer	(billed as 'Jon Kristien Andersson')
2001	The Gristle	Desk Clerk	
2002	The Moment After	Dixie Longate (Drag Queen #1)	Short film
2003	Girls Will Be Girls	Receptionist	
2004	Hellbent	White Pepper	
2004	Rapid Guy Movement	Farrah 31 (Drag Queen)	(Short)
2004	Subway Cafe	Chester Springfield	
2004	I Audition	Ron	(Short)
2006	Courts mais GAY: Tome 12	Farrah 31 (Drag Queen) (segment "Rendez-vous")	

=== Television ===
Year	Title	Role	Notes
1999	Tracey Takes On...	Classroom Dancer	TV series
2003-2004	American Dreams	Bandstand Lead Singer / Zombie #5	TV series, 2 episodes
2016	The Call Room	Dixie Longate	TV series, 1 Episode
