= Bojan Dimitrijević (actor) =

Serbian actor and politician (born 1973)

- Бојан Димитријевић

Member of the National Assembly
- Incumbent
- Assumed office 17 November 2026

Personal details
- Born: 4 November 1973 (age 53) Leskovac, SR Serbia, SFR Yugoslavia
- Party: Independent
- Other political affiliations: Student List (2026–present)
- Occupation: Actor

Bojan Dimitrijević (Serbian: Бојан Димитријевић; born 4 November 1973) is a Serbian actor and politician. He is best known for playing Pikac, a drug addict, in the television series Vratiće se rode. Elected on the Student List in the 2026 parliamentary election, he has been a member of the National Assembly since 17 November 2026.

== Acting career ==
Dimitrijević's film credits include Nataša (2001), Boomerang (2001), Država mrtvih (2002), Diši duboko (2004), Sivi kamion crvene boje (2004) and Jesen stiže, dunjo moja (2004).

His theatre roles include parts in productions of Trainspotting and Shopping and Fucking at the Bitef Theatre.

He appears in the music video for Skunk Anansie's "My Ugly Boy", from their 2010 album Wonderlustre.

== Political career ==
Dimitrijević was placed 138th on the Student List for the 25 October 2026 snap parliamentary election. The list won 140 of the 250 seats, and the Republic Electoral Commission allocated him a mandate on 6 November 2026. His mandate was confirmed at the constitutive session of the 15th convocation on 17 November 2026, and he is a member of the Student List parliamentary group.
