= Mirko Lang =

German actor (born 1978)

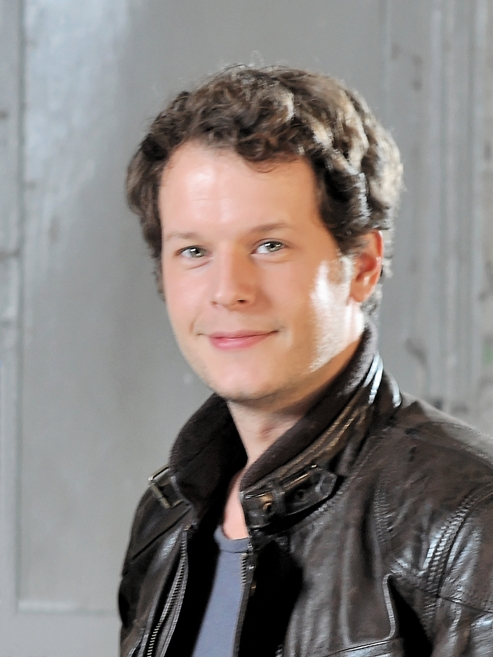
- Mirko Lang (2010)
- Born: October 5, 1978 (age 47); Bremen, West Germany

Mirko Lang is a German actor, who has appeared in many different screenplays, television shows, as well as stage productions. Born in October 1978 in Bremen, West Germany, he currently lives in Berlin. After doing his Abitur he started studying music and theatre in Hannover, where he also had his first appearances on stage. While still studying, he starred in several motion pictures including Engel & Joe (where he had a leading part) and Das Wunder von Bern, which was a popular German movie. He finished studying in 2002 and won a Talent Award for being the best talented young actor in Germany. Since then, he has been working as an independent actor.

== Movie appearances ==
- Born Guilty (2005)
- Aeon Flux (2004)
- Blood of the Templars (2004)
- Männer wie wir (2003)
- Das Wunder von Bern (2002)
- Engel & Joe (2001)

== Theatrical appearances ==
- Shakespeare’s Was ihr wollt (2004–05)
- Astrid Lindgren’s Brüder Löwenherz (2002–04)
- Die Nibelungen (2002)
- Winner & Loser (2001–05)
