= Summer Storm (2004 film) =

- Theatrical release poster
- Directed by: Marco Kreuzpaintner
- Written by: Thomas Bahmann; Marco Kreuzpaintner
- Produced by: Jakob Claussen
- Starring: Robert Stadlober; Kostja Ullmann; Alicja Bachleda-Curuś; Miriam Morgenstern
- Cinematography: Daniel Gottschalk
- Edited by: Hansjörg Weißbrich
- Music by: Niki Reiser
- Distributed by: X Verleih AG (though Warner Bros. Pictures)
- Release date: 2 September 2004
- Running time: 94 minutes
- Country: Germany
- Language: German
- Budget: €2.7 million ($3.5 million)
- Box office: $2,085,166

Summer Storm (German: Sommersturm) is a 2004 German coming-of-age comedy-drama film directed by Marco Kreuzpaintner, starring Robert Stadlober, Kostja Ullmann, Alicja Bachleda-Curuś, and Miriam Morgenstern. The story is set to the background of a rowing regatta, which climaxes into a summer storm.

== Plot ==
Teams from all across Germany descend on a quiet camping ground for a week of training leading up to a final rowing competition. The plot follows the members of the RSC rowing club from southern Germany as they train for the regatta.

The boys are excited by the prospects of camping with a female rowing team from Berlin. However, by a stroke of fate, the Berlin girls' team cancels and is replaced by Queerschlag ("Queerstrokes"), a gay youth rowing team, and these boys are out, proud, and vocal about it.

Amidst the occasionally tense interactions between the members of his team and those of Queerschlag, Tobi is himself forced to confront his long-time feelings for his close friend and teammate Achim, who is already romantically involved with his girlfriend Sandra. Spurned by Achim, Tobi is devastated, but is partly consoled by his new friendship with Queerschlag member Leo.

The tension between the members of the two teams culminates in a scene set to the backdrop of a summer storm, during which Leo confronts Tobi about his homosexuality in front of his teammates. Tobi denies being gay, and, in an attempt to defend him, one of his teammates tells Tobi's girlfriend Anke to tell the rest of his teammates so. Anke, the only person to whom Tobi has confided his secret, remains silent.

Ultimately, Tobi comes out to his teammates and his rowing team, who seem to accept Tobi no matter what, and they go on to compete with Queerschlag in the final regatta.

== Cast ==
- Robert Stadlober as Tobi
- Kostja Ullmann as Achim
- Alicja Bachleda-Curuś as Anke
- Miriam Morgenstern as Sandra
- Jürgen Tonkel as Hansi
- Tristano Casanova as Georg
- Marlon Kittel as Leo
- Hanno Koffler as Malte
- Ludwig Blochberger as Oli
- Alexa Maria Surholt as Susanne
- Joseph M'Barek as Ferdinand "Ferdi"

== Critical reception ==
Summer Storm received mixed reviews, currently holding a 48% rating on review aggregator website Rotten Tomatoes based on 31 reviews. On Metacritic, the film has a 51/100 rating, signifying "mixed or average reviews".

According to Dennis Harvey of Variety, the film have "…psychologically sharp writing and performances".

Michael Wilmington of Chicago Tribune said that "Summer Storm is a contemporary teen summer romance with a modern sexual twist" and "believable characters".

Steve Murray of The Atlanta Journal-Constitution "Summer Storm nicely captures the awkward confusion of first-time sexual encounters (gay or straight) and the collateral wounds caused by deceiving others and oneself".

German website Kabeleins praised the film for being "beautifully produced" and actors as "very authentically played".

London-based branch of Time Out wrote that "...the story's main strength lies in its characters..."

TV Guide's Alexander Ryll called the film "An observant and sensitively played drama about adolescent sexuality, unrequited love and heartbreak", while Kevin Thomas of Los Angeles Times said that "Kreuzpaintner displays a natural gift with actors and a clarity in storytelling that result in a fresh take on what otherwise might have been a familiar coming-of-age story." Ella Taylor of LA Weekly also commented on the film, calling it "A lovely wallow in the sweaty pains and joys of mostly gay adolescent love".

== Accolades ==
- Summer Storm received the audience award of the Filmfest München 2004.
- Director (Marco Kreuzpaintner), New Faces Award, Germany, 2005
- Best Young Actor – Film (Robert Stadlober)

== Soundtrack ==
The soundtrack contains the smash hit "Willkommen" from the album Herz by the German duo Rosenstolz; the single made the German Top 10 charts in September 2004.

1. "Blonde on Blonde" by Nada Surf
2. "Shake the Foundation" by Radio 4
3. "Willkommen" by Rosenstolz
4. "Los, Wixen" by Niki Reiser
5. "Auf ins Bergische" by Niki Reiser
6. "We'll Never Know" by Roman Fischer
7. "Maltes Kuss" by Niki Reiser
8. "Flames" by VAST
9. "Verwirrt" by Niki Reiser
10. "Achim" by Niki Reiser
11. "Getaway" by Roman Fischer
12. "Jim's Theme" by Niki Reiser
13. "Coming Out" by Niki Reiser
14. "Catch Me" by Kerosin
15. "We Oh We" by The Hidden Cameras
16. "Crooked Lines" by The Go-Betweens
17. "For Lovers" by Wolfman/Pete Doherty
18. "The Power of Love" by Frankie Goes to Hollywood
19. "Sommersturm" by Niki Reiser
20. "The Summer We Had" by Nova International
21. "Go West" by Nova International
