= Robert Stadlober =

Austrian actor

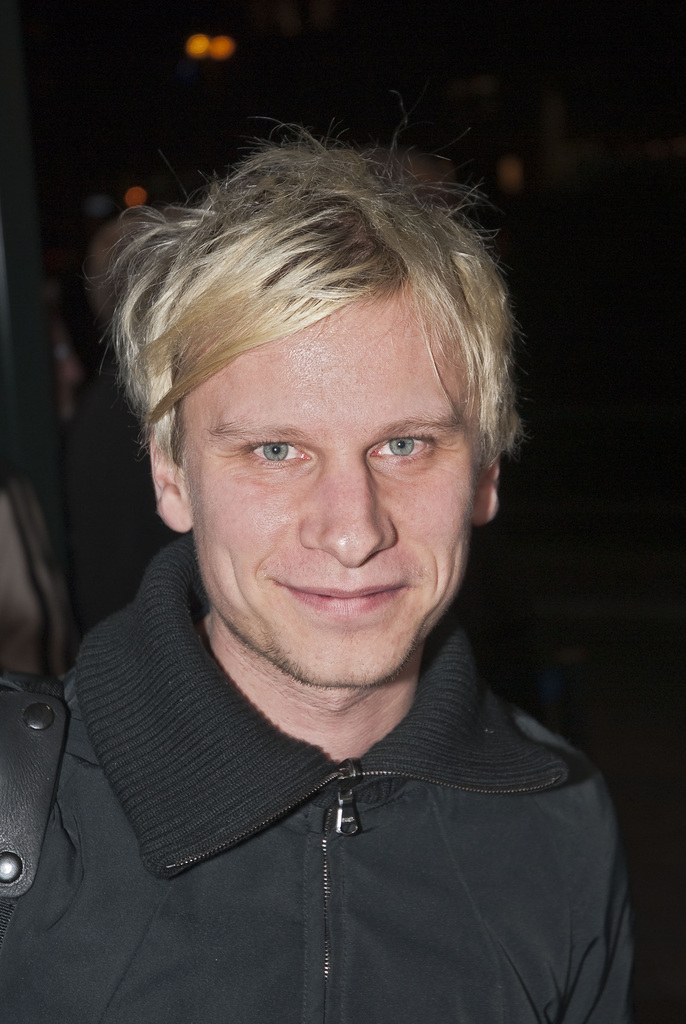
- Stadlober at the 58th Berlin International Film Festival (2008)
- Born: Friesach, Carinthia, Austria
- Occupations: Actor; musician
- Years active: 1995–present
- Relatives: Anja Stadlober (sister)

Robert Stadlober is an Austrian actor and musician.

== Life and career ==
Robert Stadlober was born in Friesach in the Austrian province of Carinthia, and grew up in Puchfeld in the Steiermark (Austria) and in Berlin (Germany). As a child, he worked as a voiceover artist for several films and he acted in different TV productions and motion picture films also. His largest success is playing the main role as Benjamin Lebert, a partially disabled teenager at a boarding school, in the film Crazy (2000). Later, he starred in Summer Storm (2004), a gay coming-of-age story set at a rowing summer-camp. Although The Advocate has claimed that he is bisexual, Stadtlober himself objects to such labelling, saying that he's just had some homosexual experiences and that this is normal.

He was awarded the "best young actor" award at the Montreal World Film Festival in 2004 for his portrayal in Summer Storm.

He is also a singer and musician. He used to be in the rock Band Gary with David Winter and Rasmus Engler where he was the lead singer and played the guitar. He is now a third of Indie band Escorial Gruen.

Further, since 2007 he also runs the independent record label Siluh records.

Until 2007, he made three movies together with Tom Schilling: Crazy (2000), Play It Loud! (2003) and Black Sheep (2006).

Stadlober currently lives in Berlin (2008). His sister is Anja Stadlober, also an actress.

== Filmography ==
Year	Title	Role	Notes
1995	Ausweglos	Kristof Heincke	TV movie
1996	Alarm für Cobra 11 - Die Autobahnpolizei	Matthias	TV series (Season 1, Episode 9: Endstation für alle)
1996	Bibi Blocksberg	Micky (voice)	TV series (Season 1, Episode 3: Bibi Blocksberg als Babysitter)
1996	Nach uns die Sintflut	Benjamin Rittberg	TV movie
1996	Hallo, Onkel Doc!	Micky Möller	TV series (Season 3, Episode 9: Die Übermacht)
1997	Corinna Pabst – Fünf Kinder brauchen eine Mutter	Marco Pabst	TV movie
1997	Mama ist unmöglich	Tobias	TV series (Season 1, Episode 7: Mama ahoi!; Episode 11: Alles aus Liebe; Episode 13: (K)ein Fall für Mama)
1998	Der letzte Zeuge	Felix Deven	TV series (Season 1, Episode 4: Denn sie wissen, was sie tun)
1998	Schimanski	Rumpelstilzchen	TV series (Season 1, Episode 5: Rattennest)
1998	Kai Rabe gegen die Vatikankiller	Junge 1	
1998	Alphateam – Die Lebensretter im OP	Ronald Köppke	TV series (Season 3, Episode 24: Sehnsucht nach Liebe)
1999	Polizeiruf 110	Mark	TV series (Season 28, Episode 3: Mörderkind)
1999	Operation Phoenix – Jäger zwischen den Welten	Roman Arendt	TV series (Season 1, Episode 7: Der Erlkönig)
1999	Die Todesgrippe von Köln	Jan Kessler	TV movie
1999	Sonnenallee	Wuschel	
1999	Die Cleveren	Marcel Nowak	TV series (Season 1, Episode 5: Das Mörderkind)
1999	Die Wache	Leo Labowski	TV series (Season 6, Episode 16: Dornröschen)
2000	Der Sommer mit Boiler	Unnamed role	TV movie
2000	Bella Block	Unnamed role	TV series (Season 1, Episode 7: Abschied im Licht)
2000	Crazy	Benjamin Lebert	
2000	Liebst du mich	Paul	TV movie
2001	180°	Benni	
2001	Enemy at the Gates	Spotter	
2001	Heidi	Student	
2001	Engel & Joe	Engel	
2002	Blackberry	Andre	
2002	Verdammt verliebt	Sven Maibach	TV series (Season 1, Episode 1: Küss' niemals deinen besten Freund; Episode 2: Frösche und Prinzen)
2002	Klaustrophobie	Klaus Kinski	Short film
2002	Noch fünf Stunden	Kocke	Short film
2002	Sophiiiie!	Toby	
2003	Play It Loud!	Vince	
2003	The Danube	Bruno	
2004	Felix Ende	Felix Ende	
2004	Summer Storm	Tobi	
1999–2005	Tatort	Unnamed role	TV series (Episode 411: Kinder der Gewalt) (1999)
1999–2005	Tatort	Freddy Knopf	TV series (Episode 416: Licht und Schatten) (1999)
1999–2005	Tatort	Erwin Feichtner	TV series (Episode 604: Der Teufel vom Berg) (2005)
2006	The Crown Prince	Emperor Wilhelm II of Germany	TV movie
2006	Die Frau vom vierten Foto unten rechts	Ramon	Short film
2006	Black Sheep	Breslin	
2006	Peer Gynt	Peer Gynt	TV movie
2007	Free to Leave	Ferdinand	
2008	Berlin by the Sea	Tom	
2008	Krabat	Lyschko	Also known as Krabat and the Legend of the Satanic Mill
2008	Love Me Forever	Billy Smith	
2009	Flores negras	Unnamed role	
2009	Live Wire	Cheesie	
2009	Tender Parasites	Jakob	
2009	Rahel – Eine preußische Affäre	Prince Louis Ferdinand	TV movie
2009	Rumpelstiltskin	Rumpelstilzchen	TV movie
2010	Jew Suss: Rise and Fall	Lutz	
2010	Der Mann, der über Autos sprang	Julian	
2010	Kottan ermittelt: Rien ne va plus	Alfred Schrammel	
2011	Adam's End	Adam	
2011	The Way to Live	Mirko	
2012	Say Goodbye to the Story	Unnamed role	Short film
2012	Mary of Nazareth	Hircanus	TV movie
2012	Fly Away	Mittwoch	
2012	SOKO 5113	Benno Ortmann	TV series (Season 38, Episode 12: Dominiks Bauchgefühl)
2013	Steirerblut	Mike	TV movie (in production)
2014	Diplomacy	Lieutenant Bressensdorf	
2014	Kafka's The Burrow	Wachmann	
2017	Trench 11	Reiner	Horror film
2018	Mack the Knife: Brecht's Threepenny Film	Kurt Weill	
2018–2020	Das Boot	Smut	TV series
2019	Berlin, I Love You	Damiel	
2022	The Silent Forest	Konrad Dallmann	Movie
2024	Andrea Gets a Divorce	Walter	Josef Hader director

== Voiceovers ==
- Grosse Pause (Recess) – T.J. Detweiler (First two seasons only)
- Das wandelnde Schloss (Howl's Moving Castle) (as Howl)
