= Gestern war heute noch morgen =

Box set by Böhse Onkelz
- Released: 5 March 2001
- Genre: Heavy metal, Hard rock
- Length: 73:47 / 75:08 / 57:38
- Label: rule23
- Producer: Böhse Onkelz

Böhse Onkelz chronology
20 Jahre - Live in Frankfurt	Gestern war heute noch morgen	Dopamin

Gestern war heute noch morgen (German for "Yesterday, today was still tomorrow") is a song compilation of the German rock band Böhse Onkelz. It was released on three CDs. The box reached the third position in the German Media Control Charts which is really rare for best-ofs.

== Track listing ==
CD 1 - Gestern - the classic from 1988–2000

1. "Dunkler Ort"
2. "Finde die Wahrheit"
3. "Kirche"
4. "Nichts ist für die Ewigkeit"
5. "Onkelz 2000"
6. "So sind wir"
7. "Terpentin"
8. "Wir ham' noch lange nicht genug"
9. "Hier sind die Onkelz"
10. "Auf gute Freunde"
11. "Danket dem Herrn"
12. "Danke für Nichts"
13. "Lieber stehend sterben"
14. "Nur die Besten sterben jung"
15. "Kneipenterroristen"
16. "Nie wieder"
17. "Das ist mein Leben"

CD 2 - Heute - the favourite songs of the band

1. "Das Wunder der Persönlichkeit"
2. "Ich"
3. "Für immer"
4. "Du kannst alles haben"
5. "Ein langer Weg"
6. "Entfache dieses Feuer"
7. "Schutzgeist der Scheiße"
8. "Worte der Freiheit"
9. "Koma"
10. "Deutschland im Herbst"
11. "Regen"
12. "1000 Fragen"
13. "Bin ich nur glücklich, wenn es schmerzt"
14. "Weit weg"
15. "Schrei nach Freiheit"

CD 3 - Morgen - old songs, re-recordings, B-sides and live tracks

1. "Ich bin in dir" - Version 2001
2. "Wieder mal 'nen Tag verschenkt" - Version 2001
3. "Ein Mensch wie du und ich" (Re-recording)
4. "Das Tier in mir" (Re-recording)
5. "Heut Nacht" (Re-recording)
6. "Mexico" (Original version)
7. "Lügenmarsch"
8. "Stöckel und Strapse"
9. "Heute trinken wir richtig"
10. "11/97"
11. "Erinnerungen" - Live in Berlin June 2000
12. "Könige für einen Tag"
13. "Stunde des Siegers"
14. "Benutz mich"
15. "Wie tief willst du noch sinken"

== Reception ==
Professional ratings
Review scores
Source	Rating
Metal Hammer	5/7 stars

Matthias Mineur of the music magazine Metal Hammer rated the album five out of seven stars.

== Chart performance ==
Chart performance for Gestern war heute noch morgen
Chart (2001)	Peak position
German Albums (Offizielle Top 100)	3
Austrian Albums (Ö3 Austria)	13
Swiss Albums (Schweizer Hitparade)	24
