= List of Warner Bros. theatrical animated feature films =

This is a list of theatrical animated feature films produced or released by Warner Bros., a division of Skydance Corporation. Warner Bros. releases films from Warner-owned and non-Warner owned animation studios. Most films listed below were produced by Warner Bros. divisions, but Warner Bros. has also released films produced by other production companies, such as United Productions of America and Don Bluth Ireland Ltd. Additionally, Warner Bros.'s Japanese division has helped co-produce and release anime films in that country, such as Summer Wars and Puella Magi Madoka Magica: The Movie.

Note: Although Warner Bros. handled overseas theatrical distribution of Disney films from 1988 to 1992 (e.g. Who Framed Roger Rabbit, Oliver & Company, Beauty and the Beast), Disney titles are not included in this list. The same applies to most Universal-era Dreamworks Animation titles where Warner Bros. theatrically distributes them in select territories (e.g. Forgotten Island).

== Films ==
Color legend
Warner Bros. Cartoons (1964)	
Warner Bros. Animation (1981–present)	
Warner Bros. Feature Animation (1996–2003)	
Rothkirch Cartoon Film (1999–2021)	
Cartoon Network Studios (2002–present)	
Warner Animation Group (2014–2026); Warner Bros. Pictures Animation (2026–present)	
Other Warner Bros. Studio	
Third-party studio	
An adult animated production	^{A}
Distribution only	^{D}
Live-action/animation hybrid sold as animation	^{S}
Produced for video release, but given a brief theatrical release shortly before its video release.	^{V}

=== American releases ===
Title	Original theatrical release date (Note: Listed are the original theatrical release dates in the United States (or other non-U.S. territories) when the film was contributed by the Warner Bros. Different distributors are attributed and credited for distributing each film throughout the history of the Warner Bros.)	Animation studio
Gay Purr-ee^{[D]}	October 24, 1962	United Productions of America (UPA)
The Incredible Mr. Limpet^{[S]}	March 28, 1964	Warner Bros. Cartoons
Treasure Island^{[D]}	July 10, 1973 (Note: Limited release in the United States.)	Filmation
Oliver Twist^{[D]}	July 10, 1974	Filmation
The Bugs Bunny/Road Runner Movie	September 28, 1979	Chuck Jones Enterprises
The Looney Looney Looney Bugs Bunny Movie	November 20, 1981	Warner Bros. Animation
Hey Good Lookin'^{[A]}	October 1, 1982	Bakshi Productions
Bugs Bunny's 3rd Movie: 1001 Rabbit Tales	November 19, 1982	Warner Bros. Animation
Twice Upon a Time^{[D]}	August 5, 1983	Lucasfilm and Korty Films (Note: Released by The Ladd Company)
Daffy Duck's Fantastic Island	August 5, 1983	Warner Bros. Animation
Rainbow Brite and the Star Stealer^{[D]}	November 15, 1985	DIC Audiovisuel
Daffy Duck's Quackbusters	September 24, 1988	Warner Bros. Animation
The Nutcracker Prince^{[D]}	November 21, 1990	Lacewood Productions
Rover Dangerfield^{[D]}	August 2, 1991	Hyperion Animation
Batman: Mask of the Phantasm	December 25, 1993	Warner Bros. Animation (Note: Released under the Warner Bros. Family Entertainment label.)
Thumbelina^{[D]}	March 30, 1994	Sullivan Bluth Studios
A Troll in Central Park^{[D]}	October 7, 1994	Sullivan Bluth Studios
Space Jam^{[S]}	November 15, 1996	Warner Bros. Feature Animation, Northern Lights Entertainment and Courtside Seats Productions
Cats Don't Dance^{[D]}	March 26, 1997	Turner Feature Animation and David Krischner Productions
Quest for Camelot	May 15, 1998	Warner Bros. Feature Animation
Jack Frost^{[S]}^{[D]}	December 11, 1998	Azoff Entertainment and The Canton Company
The King and I^{[D]}	March 19, 1999	Rich Animation Studios and Rankin/Bass Productions
The Iron Giant	August 6, 1999	Warner Bros. Feature Animation
Pokémon: The First Movie^{[D]}	November 12, 1999 (Note: Original release date was July 18, 1998) (Note: Released by Warner Bros. Pictures in North America)	OLM, Inc. and The Pokémon Company (English dub handled by 4Kids Entertainment)
Pokémon: the Movie 2000^{[D]}	July 21, 2000 (Note: Original release date was July 17, 1999)	OLM, Inc. and The Pokémon Company (English dub handled by 4Kids Entertainment)
Pokémon 3: The Movie^{[D]}	April 6, 2001 (Note: Original release date was July 8, 2000)	OLM, Inc. and The Pokémon Company (English dub handled by 4Kids Entertainment)
Cats & Dogs^{[S]}	July 4, 2001	Village Roadshow Pictures, Chris Bender, Cat Fight Pictures, Zide/Perry Productions, Mad Chance and NPV Entertainment
Osmosis Jones^{[S]}	August 10, 2001	Warner Bros. Feature Animation and Conundrum Entartainment
Scooby-Doo^{[S]}	June 14, 2002	Mosaic Media Group
The Powerpuff Girls Movie^{[D]}	July 3, 2002	Cartoon Network Studios
Kangaroo Jack^{[S]}	January 17, 2003	Castle Rock Entertainment and Jerry Bruckheimer Films
Looney Tunes: Back in Action^{[S]}	November 14, 2003	Warner Bros. Feature Animation
Scooby-Doo 2: Monsters Unleashed^{[S]}	March 26, 2004	Mosaic Media Group
Clifford's Really Big Movie^{[D]}	April 23, 2004	Scholastic Entertainment and Big Red Dog Productions
Yu-Gi-Oh! The Movie: Pyramid of Light^{[D]}	August 13, 2004	Gallop (English dub handled by 4Kids Entertainment)
The Polar Express^{[D]}	November 10, 2004	Castle Rock Entertainment, Shangri-La Entertainment, Playtone and ImageMovers
Tom and Jerry: The Fast and the Furry^{[V]}	September 3, 2005	Turner Entertainment Co.and Warner Bros. Animation
Corpse Bride^{[D]}	September 23, 2005	Tim Burton Productions and Laika
Scooby-Doo! in Where's My Mummy?^{[V]}	December 13, 2005	Turner Entertainment Co.and Warner Bros. Animation
A Scanner Darkly^{[A]}^{[D]}	July 7, 2006	Thousand Words, Section Eight Productions, Detour Filmproduction and 3 Arts Entertainment (Note: Released by Warner Independent Pictures)
The Ant Bully^{[D]}	July 28, 2006	Legendary Pictures, Playtone and DNA Productions
Happy Feet^{[S]}^{[D]}	November 17, 2006	Village Roadshow Pictures and Animal Logic
TMNT^{[D]}	March 23, 2007	Imagi Animation Studios and The Weinstein Company
Aqua Teen Hunger Force Colon Movie Film for Theaters ^{[A]}	April 13, 2007	Williams Street; distribution by First Look Pictures
Star Wars: The Clone Wars^{[D]}	August 15, 2008	Lucasfilm Animation
Shorts^{[S]}^{[D]}	August 21, 2009	Imagenation Abu Dhabi, Media Rights Capital and Troublemaker Studios
Cats & Dogs: The Revenge of Kitty Galore^{[S]}	July 30, 2010	Village Roadshow Pictures And Rhythm & Hues Studios
Legend of the Guardians: The Owls of Ga'Hoole^{[D]}	September 24, 2010	Village Roadshow Pictures and Animal Logic
Yogi Bear^{[S]}	December 17, 2010	De Line Pictures, Sunswept Entertainment and Rhythm & Hues Studios
A Very Harold & Kumar 3D Christmas^{[S]}	November 4, 2011	New Line Cinema, Mandate Pictures and Kingsgate Films
Happy Feet Two^{[S]}^{[D]}	November 18, 2011	Village Roadshow Pictures and Dr. D Studios
The Lego Movie^{[S]}	February 7, 2014	Warner Animation Group and Village Roadshow Pictures
Regular Show: The Movie^{[V]}	August 14, 2015	Cartoon Network Studios
Batman: The Killing Joke^{[A]}^{[V]}	July 25, 2016	Warner Bros. Animation and DC Entertainment
Storks	September 23, 2016	Warner Animation Group and RatPac Entertainment
Batman: Return of the Caped Crusaders^{[V]}	October 10, 2016	Warner Bros. Animation and DC Entertainment
The Lego Batman Movie	February 10, 2017	Warner Animation Group, DC Entertainment and RatPac Entertainment
Batman and Harley Quinn^{[A]}^{[V]}	August 14, 2017	Warner Bros. Animation and DC Entertainment
The Lego Ninjago Movie^{[S]}	September 22, 2017	Warner Animation Group and RatPac Entertainment
Paddington 2^{[D]}^{[S]}	January 12, 2018	StudioCanal and Heyday Films
Ready Player One^{[S]}	March 29, 2018	Village Roadshow Pictures, Amblin Entertainment and Amblin Partners
Batman Ninja^{[A]}^{[V]}	June 15, 2018	Warner Bros. Animation, DC Comics, YamatoWorks and Barnum Studio
Teen Titans Go! To the Movies	July 27, 2018	Warner Bros. Animation and DC Entertainment
Smallfoot	September 28, 2018	Warner Animation Group and Zaftig Films
The Death of Superman^{[A]}^{[V]}	January 13, 2019	Warner Bros. Animation and DC Entertainment
Reign of The Supermen^{[A]}^{[V]}	January 13, 2019	Warner Bros. Animation and DC Entertainment
The Lego Movie 2: The Second Part^{[S]}	February 8, 2019	Warner Animation Group
Pokémon Detective Pikachu^{[S]}^{[D]}	May 10, 2019	Legendary Pictures and The Pokémon Company
Scooby-Doo! Return to Zombie Island^{[V]}	September 3, 2019	Warner Bros. Animation
Scoob!	May 15, 2020 (Note: Released on Premium VOD in the United States and Canada on May 15, 2020) (Note: It was later released in theaters in select countries with relaxed COVID-19 restrictions beginning July 8, 2020.)	Warner Animation Group
We Bare Bears: The Movie^{[V]}	June 30, 2020	Cartoon Network Studios
Tom & Jerry^{[S]}	February 26, 2021	Warner Animation Group
Space Jam: A New Legacy^{[S]}	July 16, 2021	Warner Animation Group
Catwoman: Hunted^{[A]}^{[V]}	May 10, 2022	Warner Bros. Animation and DC Entertainment
DC League of Super-Pets	July 29, 2022	Warner Animation Group, DC Studios and Seven Bucks Productions
The Lord of the Rings: The War of the Rohirrim^{[A]}	December 13, 2024 (Note: Released by New Line Cinema through Warner Bros. Pictures.)	Warner Bros. Animation, New Line Cinema and Sola Entertainment
The Day the Earth Blew Up: A Looney Tunes Movie	March 14, 2025	Warner Bros. Animation (distribution by Ketchup Entertainment)
Batman Ninja vs. Yakuza League^{[A]}^{[V]}	March 18, 2025	Warner Bros. Animation, DC Entertainment, YamatoWorks and Barnum Studio
A Minecraft Movie^{[S]}	April 4, 2025	Legendary Pictures, Mojang Studios, Vertigo Entertainment, On the Roam
Aztec Batman: Clash of Empires^{[A]}^{[V]}	September 18, 2025 (Note: Owned by Disney (via 20th Century Studios))	Ánima, Warner Bros. Animation, DC Studios, Chatrone and Particular Crowd
Coyote vs. Acme^{[S]}	August 28, 2026	Warner Animation Group, Troll Court Entertainment and Keylight Pictures (distribution by Ketchup Entertainment)
The Cat in the Hat	November 6, 2026	Warner Bros. Pictures Animation and Dr. Seuss Enterprises

=== Upcoming ===
Title	Release date	Production companies
Animal Friends^{[S]}^{[D]}	January 22, 2027	Legendary Pictures, Maximum Effort and Prime Focus
Bad Fairies	May 21, 2027	Warner Bros. Pictures Animation, Locksmith Animation and Sketchshark Productions
A Minecraft Movie Squared^{[SL]}	July 23, 2027	Legendary Pictures, Mojang Studios, Vertigo Entertainment, On the Roam and Xbox Pictures
Margie Claus	November 12, 2027	Warner Bros. Pictures Animation and On the Day Productions
Oh, the Places You'll Go!	March 17, 2028	Warner Bros. Pictures Animation, Bad Robot Productions and Dr. Seuss Enterprises
The Hello Kitty Movie^{[S]}	July 21, 2028	Warner Bros. Pictures Animation, New Line Cinema, Sanrio, and FlynnPictureCo.
Dynamic Duo	September 22, 2028	Warner Bros. Pictures Animation, DC Studios, Swaybox, and 6th & Idaho
The Lunar Chronicles	November 3, 2028	Warner Bros. Pictures Animation and Locksmith Animation
Undated
Untitled Care Bears film^{[SL]}^{[D]}	TBA	GoldDay, Good Fear and Authentic Brands Group
Emily The Strange	TBA	Warner Bros. Pictures Animation, Bad Robot and Dark Horse Entertainment
The Ice Dragon	TBA	Warner Bros. Pictures Animation
Meerkat Manor	TBA	Warner Bros. Pictures Animation, The Green Room and Oxford Scientific Films
Meet the Flintstones	TBA	Warner Bros. Pictures Animation
Prehistoria	TBA	Warner Bros. Pictures Animation and SpindleHorse Toons
Thisby Thestoop	TBA	Warner Bros. Pictures Animation
Untitled Looney Tunes film	TBA	Warner Bros. Pictures Animation
Untitled Speedy Gonzales film	TBA	Warner Bros. Pictures Animation and Mexopolis
Untitled The Powerpuff Girls film	TBA	Warner Bros. Pictures Animation and Cartoon Network Studios
Untitled Thundercats film	TBA	Warner Bros. Pictures Animation
Untitled Tom and Jerry film	TBA	Warner Bros. Pictures Animation and Turner Entertainment Co.

=== International releases ===
Title	Original theatrical release date (Note: All of the following films are released by Warner Bros. outside North America)	Animation studio
The Pebble and the Penguin^{[D]}	April 12, 1995 (Note: Internationally released by Warner Bros., released by Metro-Goldwyn-Mayer in US.)	Don Bluth Ireland Ltd. (Note: Co-produced with Metro-Goldwyn-Mayer in post-production after MGM's acquisition of the film.)
The Fearless Four^{[D]}	October 2, 1997	Munich Animation
South Park: Bigger, Longer & Uncut^{[A]}	June 30, 1999 (Note: Copyright owned by Warner Bros. and Paramount Pictures. The former also received credit in the US release.)	Comedy Central Films, Scott Rudin Productions and Paramount Pictures
Tobias Totz and his Lion	September 30, 1999	Rothkirch Cartoon-Film and Munich Animation
Serafín: La película^{[SA]}^{[D]}	July 13, 2001	Coyoacán Films and Videocine
The Little Polar Bear	April 11, 2003	Rothkirch Cartoon-Film
Back to Gaya^{[D]}	March 18, 2004	Ambient Entertainment
Laura's Star	February 11, 2005	Rothkirch Cartoon-Film
Xuxinha and Guto against the Space Monsters	December 25, 2005	Diler & Associados, Xuxa Produções, and Globo Filmes
The Little Polar Bear 2 – The Mysterious Island	June 8, 2006	Rothkirch Cartoon-Film
Brave Story	July 8, 2006	Gonzo
The Trip to Panama	September 21, 2006	Rothkirch Cartoon-Film
The Ugly Duckling and Me!^{[D]}	December 21, 2006 (Germany)	A. Film A/S, TV2 Denmark, Futurikon and Magma Films
The Reef^{[D]}	February 9, 2007	Starz Animation
Two Times Lotte	May 10, 2007	Trickompany Filmproduktion and Lunaris Film- und Fernsehproduktion
Beowulf^{[A]}^{[D]}	November 16, 2007	ImageMovers and Paramount Pictures
Little Dodo	January 1, 2008	Rothkirch Cartoon-Film
The Sky Crawlers^{[D]}	August 2, 2008	Production I.G and Sony Pictures
Summer Wars^{[D]}	August 1, 2009	Madhouse and Funimation Entertainment
Laura's Star and the Mysterious Dragon Nian	September 24, 2009	Rothkirch Cartoon-Film
Bird Idol^{[D]}	April 23, 2010	Goel Screencraft and Irealities Technology
Gintama: The Movie^{[D]}	April 24, 2010	Aniplex and Sunrise
The Illusionist^{[D]}	August 20, 2010 (Note: Released in UK by Warner Bros., released by Sony Pictures Classics in US.)	Django Films and Sony Pictures Classics
Ramayana: The Epic^{[D]}	October 15, 2010	Maya Digital Media
Nintama Rantarou Movie: Ninjutsu Gakuen Zenin Shutsudou! no Dan^{[D]}	March 12, 2011	Ajia-do Animation Works
Little Ghostly Adventures of Tofu Boy^{[D]}	April 29, 2011	「豆富小僧」制作委員会
The Prodigies^{[SA]}^{[D]}	May 15, 2011	Method Animation, LuxAnimation and DQ Entertainment
Buddha: The Great Departure^{[D]}	May 28, 2011	Tezuka Productions and Toei Animation
Top Cat: The Movie	September 16, 2011	Ánima Estudios
Laura's Star and the Dream Monsters	October 13, 2011	Rothkirch Cartoon-Film
Berserk: The Golden Age Arc I – The Egg of the King^{[D]}	February 4, 2012	Studio 4°C
Berserk: The Golden Age Arc II – The Battle for Doldrey^{[D]}	June 23, 2012	Studio 4°C
The Life of Budori Gusuko^{[D]}	July 7, 2012	Tezuka Productions
Puella Magi Madoka Magica the Movie Part 1: Beginnings^{[D]}	October 6, 2012	Aniplex
Puella Magi Madoka Magica the Movie Part 2: Eternal^{[D]}	October 13, 2012	Aniplex
Miffy the Movie^{[D]}	January 30, 2013	Telescreen Filmproducties, KRO and A. Film Production
Berserk: The Golden Age Arc III – The Advent^{[D]}	February 1, 2013	Studio 4 °C
Sammy's Great Escape^{[D]}	February 15, 2013	nWave Pictures
A Certain Magical Index: The Movie – The Miracle of Endymion^{[D]}	February 23, 2013	J.C.Staff and Funimation Entertainment
Gintama: The Movie: The Final Chapter: Be Forever Yorozuya^{[D]}	July 6, 2013	Aniplex and Sunrise
No-Eared Bunny and Two-Eared Chick	September 26, 2013	Rothkirch Cartoon-Film
Puella Magi Madoka Magica the Movie Part III: Rebellion^{[D]}	October 26, 2013	Aniplex
Giovanni's Island^{[D]}	February 22, 2014	Production I.G
The Nut Job^{[D]}	August 1, 2014 (Note: Released in the U.K. by Warner Bros., released by Open Road Films in US.)	ToonBox Entertainment
Space Brothers #0^{[D]}	August 9, 2014	A-1 Pictures
Mortadelo and Filemon: Mission Implausible^{[D]}	November 28, 2014	Ilion Animation Studios
Paddington^{[D]}^{[SL]}	January 6, 2015 (Spain)	StudioCanal, Heyday Films, TF1 Films Production and Anton Capital Entertainment
Mole Family - Haunted Forest^{[S]}	January 23, 2015	Arzum Film Animasyon and Warner Bros Turkey
Ghosthunters: On Icy Trails^{[SL]}	April 2, 2015	Warner Bros. Film Productions Germany, Lucky Bird Pictures, Immer Wieder Gerne Film, Lotus Film, Ripple World Pictures and Fish Blowing Bubbles
Asterix: The Mansions of the Gods^{[D]}	April 30, 2015 (Spain)	M6 Films, Belvision and Grid Animation
Top Cat Begins	October 30, 2015	Ánima Estudios
Mole Family 2 - The Spell of the Shadow^{[SL]}	January 22, 2016	Arzum Film Animasyon and Warner Bros Turkey
selector destructed WIXOSS	February 13, 2016	J.C.Staff
Accel World: Infinite Burst^{[D]}	July 23, 2016	Sunrise
The Little Prince^{[D]}	August 5, 2016	ON Animation Studios
My Dearest Brother: Have Aliens Arrived?^{[D]}	October 7, 2016	Portakal Animasyon
Monster Strike The Movie^{[D]}	December 10, 2016	Liden Films
Napping Princess^{[D]}	March 18, 2017	Signal.MD
The Nut Job 2: Nutty by Nature^{[D]}	August 11, 2017	ToonBox Entertainment
Monster Family	August 24, 2017	Rothkirch Cartoon-Film, Ambient Entertainment GmbH, United Entertainment, Mack Media, Agir, Sky Cinema Original Films, VideoBack
DC Super Heroes vs. Eagle Talon	October 21, 2017	DC Entertainment And DLE
Haikara-San: Here Comes Miss Modern Part 1	November 11, 2017	Nippon Animation
Luis and the Aliens^{[D]}	August 24, 2018 (UK and Ireland)	A-Film APS, Ulysses Films and Fabrique D'Images
Monster Strike The Movie: Journey Beyond the Sky^{[D]}	October 5, 2018	Orange
Haikara-San: Here Comes Miss Modern Part 2	October 19, 2018	Nippon Animation
White Snake^{[D]}	January 11, 2019	Light Chaser Animation Studios
Is It Wrong to Try to Pick Up Girls in a Dungeon?: Arrow of the Orion^{[D]}	February 15, 2019	J.C.Staff
The Wonderland^{[D]}	April 26, 2019	Aniplex and Signal.MD
Ni no kuni^{[V]}^{[D]}	August 23, 2019	OLM, Inc. and Level 5
Steven Universe: The Movie^{[V]}	October 24, 2019 (Argentina, Paraguay, and Uruguay)	Cartoon Network Studios
The Kangaroo Chronicles^{[SL]}^{[D]}	March 5, 2020	X Filme Creative Pool, ZDF, Trixter and Arri Media
Cats & Dogs 3: Paws Unite!^{[SL]}^{[D]}	September 15, 2020	Mad Chance and Creative BC
Ben 10 Versus the Universe: The Movie^{[V]}	October 10, 2020 (United Arab Emirates)	Cartoon Network Studios
Gintama: The Final^{[D]}	January 8, 2021	Bandai Namco Pictures
Moonbound^{[D]}	June 24, 2021	Brave New Work, Coop99 Filmproduktion and Little Dream Entertainment
Monster Family 2	October 15, 2021	Rothkirch Cartoon-Film, Ambient Entertainment GmbH, Sky Cinema Original Films,
Bubble^{[D]}	May 13, 2022	Wit Studio
Hui Buh and the Witchs Castle^{[SL]}	November 3, 2022	Rat Pack Filmproduktion
Kingdom of Gold, Kingdom of Water^{[D]}	January 27, 2023	Madhouse
Mummies^{[D]}	February 24, 2023	Atresmedia Cine
Suzume^{[D]}	March 8, 2023 (Note: Released in the Philippines & Thailand by Warner Bros., released by Crunchyroll & Sony Pictures Releasing in US.)	CoMix Wave Films, Story Wave
Maboroshi^{[D]}	September 15, 2023	MAPPA
Digimon Adventure 02: The Beginning^{[D]}	November 8, 2023 (Note: Released in Thailand by Warner Bros., released by Fathom Events in US.)	Toei Animation, Yumeta Company
The Boy and the Heron^{[D]}	December 8, 2023	Studio Ghibli
Spy x Family Code: White^{[D]}	February 22, 2024 (Malaysia) (Note: distributed in select international markets, Released theatrically in Malaysia by Warner Bros. Pictures, released by Crunchyroll in US.)	Wit Studio CloverWorks
Buffalo Kids^{[D]}	August 14, 2024	Atresmedia Cine
Look Back^{[A]}^{[D]}	October 25, 2024 (India)	Studio Durian, Avex Pictures And Shueisha
Ne Zha 2^{[D]}	January 29, 2025 (Note: Released in Southeast Asia and India by Warner Bros., released by CMC Pictures in US with A24 distributing the English dub version.)	Beijing Enlight Media, Beijing Enlight Pictures. Chengdu Coco Cartoon
Mobile Suit Gundam GQuuuuuuX: Beginning^{[D]}	February 28, 2025 (India)	Studio Khara And Sunrise
Tom and Jerry: Forbidden Compass	July 2, 2025 (Note: Released Internationally By Warner Bros. Pictures, released by Viva Kids in US.)	China Film Group and Origin Animation
Nintama Rantaro: Invincible Master Of The Dokutake Ninja^{[D]}	July 18, 2025 (India)	Ajia-do Animation Works
Grand Prix of Europe^{[D]}	July 24, 2025 (Note: Released theatrically in Germany by Warner Bros. Pictures, released by Viva Kids in US.)	Mack Magic
All You Need Is Kill^{[D]}	January 9, 2026	Studio 4°C
Gintama: Yoshiwara in Flames^{[D]}	February 13, 2026	Bandai Namco Pictures

== Highest grossing films ==
This list does not include films combining live-action with animation.

Rank	Film	Gross	Studio	Year	Ref.
1	The Lego Movie	$468,060,692	Warner Animation Group	2014	
2	Happy Feet	$384,335,608	Animal Logic	2006	
3	The Lego Batman Movie	$311,950,384	Warner Animation Group	2017	
4	The Polar Express	$311,365,072	ImageMovers	2004	
5	Smallfoot	$214,040,103	Warner Animation Group	2018	
6	DC League of Super-Pets	$204,840,004	Warner Animation Group	2022	
7	The Lego Movie 2: The Second Part	$191,306,508	Warner Animation Group	2019	
8	Storks	$183,388,953	Warner Animation Group	2016	
9	Tom & Jerry	$136,536,687	Warner Animation Group	2021	
10	The Lego Ninjago Movie	$123,164,177	Warner Animation Group	2017	

== See also ==
- List of Warner Bros. films

== Notes ==
Release Notes

Studio/Production Notes
