= List of Warner Bros. International films (2000–2009) =

The following is a list of foreign films produced, co-produced, and/or distributed by Warner Bros. internationally in the 2000s. This does not include direct-to-video releases or films released under joint ventures (e.g Warner Sogefilms). For the German films Warner Bros. co-distributed with X Verleih AG, see X Filme Creative Pool.

== 2000 ==
Release Date	Title	Country	Notes
February 10, 2000	Total Loss	Netherlands	distribution only; produced by Lemming Film, VPRO and Ma.Ja.De. Filmproduktion
March 31, 2000	The Prince's Manuscript	Italy	theatrical distribution only; produced by Sciarlò and RAI-Radiotelevisione Italiana
April 20, 2000	I Love You, Baby	Germany	co-production with Two Guys and a Girl Entertainment Productions
August 12, 2000	Sakuya: Slayer of Demons	Japan	co-production with TOWANI
September 28, 2000	The Little Vampire	Germany	distribution under Warner Bros. Family Entertainment only; produced by Cometstone Pictures and Stonewood Communications
November 9, 2000	Gran Paradiso	Germany	co-production with Letterbox Filmproduktion and Monty Film
December 15, 2000	Xuxa Popstar	Brazil	co-production with Globo Filmes and Xuxa Produções

== 2001 ==
Release Date	Title	Country	Notes
January 25, 2001	Little Otik	Czech Republic	distribution only; produced by Athanor, Barrandov Biografia, FilmFour and Illumination Films
January 26, 2001	Tomorrow	Italy	theatrical distribution only; produced by Rai Cinema
February 2, 2001	Vizontele	Turkey	theatrical distribution only; produced by Beşiktaş Kültür Merkezi and Bocek Yapim
February 7, 2001	Would I Lie to You? 2	France	distribution in France, Belgium and French-speaking Switzerland only; produced by M6 Films, TPS Star and TF1 Films Production
July 13, 2001	Serafín: La película	Mexico	theatrical co-distribution with Videocine under Warner Bros. Family Entertainment only; produced by Coyoacán Films
August 31, 2001	Bufo & Spallanzani	Brazil	
October 4, 2001	The Little Polar Bear	Germany	distribution under Warner Bros. Family Entertainment only; co-production with Rothkirch Cartoon-Film
December 6, 2001	Miss Minoes (Note: Owned by In The Air)	Netherlands	distribution in the Netherlands, Belgium, Germany and Austria under Warner Bros. Family Entertainment only; produced by Bos Bros. Film-TV Productions and AVRO
December 14, 2001	Xuxa e os Duendes	Brazil	co-production with Globo Filmes, Diler & Associados, TeleImage and Xuxa Produções

== 2002 ==
Release Date	Title	Country	Notes
February 22, 2002	Feuer, Eis & Dosenbier	Germany	co-production with Hofmann & Voges Entertainment
April 10, 2002	Le Boulet	France	French and Spanish distribution only; co-production with La Petite Reine, France 2 Cinéma and France 3 Cinéma
August 29, 2002	Auf Herz und Nieren	Germany	distribution only; produced by Mr. Brown Entertainment and Senator Film Produktion
September 25, 2002	Ma femme s'appelle Maurice	France	distribution only; produced by Comédie Star and France 2 Cinéma
October 3, 2002	Yes Nurse! No Nurse!	Netherlands	distribution only; produced by Bos Bros. Film-TV Productions and AVRO
October 31, 2002	Febbre da cavallo - La mandrakata	Italy	co-production with International Video 80 and Solaris International
December 13, 2002	Xuxa e os Duendes 2: No Caminho das Fadas	Brazil	co-production with Globo Filmes, Diler & Associados and Xuxa Produções

== 2003 ==
Release Date	Title	Country	Notes
January 10, 2003	It Can't Be All Our Fault	Italy	co-production with Virginia Film Sr
March 12, 2003	He's in the Army Now	Turkey	theatrical distribution only; produced by ANS
March 19, 2003	Chouchou (Note: Owned by StudioCanal)	France	distribution only; produced by Les Films Christian Fechner and France 2 Cinéma
May 16, 2003	Lost Love	Italy	distribution only; produced by L'Ottava and Sidecar
July 2, 2003	Small Voices	Philippines	distribution only; produced by College Assurance Plan Philippines, Teamwork productions and Sky Island Films
August 1, 2003	The Man of the Year	Brazil	distribution only; produced by Conspiração Filmes, Estúdios Mega, MegaColor and Quanta Centro de Produções Cinematográficas
August 23, 2003	The Battling Angel	Japan	theatrical distribution only; co-production with TOWANI
September 11, 2003	Turn Left, Turn Right	Hong Kong	co-production with Mediacorp Raintree Pictures and Milkyway Image
September 26, 2003	Young Adam (Note: U.K. distribution rights owned by Icon Film Distribution)	United Kingdom	distribution only; produced by Recorded Picture Company, UK Film Council, Scottish Screen and HanWay Films
October 29, 2003	Sea of Silence	Netherlands	distribution in the Netherlands and Belgium only; produced by Isabella Films, Sophimages, Lichtblick Film and Zentropa
December 19, 2003	Xuxa Abracadabra	Brazil	co-production with Globo Filmes, Diler & Associados, TeleImage and Xuxa Produções

== 2004 ==
Release Date	Title	Country	Notes
January 23, 2004	Vizontele Tuuba	Turkey	theatrical distribution only; produced by Beşiktaş Kültür Merkezi
January 30, 2004	A Summer Show	Brazil	co-production with Diler & Associados and Xuxa Produções
March 3, 2004	Malabar Princess	France	French and Belgian distribution only; produced by Epithète Films and France 3 Cinéma
March 12, 2004	Three Steps Over Heaven	Italy	distribution only; produced by Cattleya
March 18, 2004	Back to Gaya	Germany	distribution only; produced by Ambient Entertainment, Recorded Picture Company and Morena Films
March 19, 2004	Love Returns	Italy	distribution only; produced by Bianca Film
March 31, 2004	L'Incruste	France	distribution only; produced by Les Films Christian Fechner, France 2 Cinéma and Zagzig Productions
May 29, 2004	Cutie Honey	Japan	theatrical distribution only; co-production with TOWANI
June 3, 2004	Double Zéro	France	distribution only; produced by La Petite Reine
September 10, 2004	Redeemer	Brazil	co-production with Conspiração Filmes
September 17, 2004	Trauma	United Kingdom	distribution only; produced by BBC Films, Isle of Man Film and Little Bird Productions
September 23, 2004	Laura's Star	Germany	distribution under Warner Bros. Family Entertainment only; co-production with Rothkirch Cartoon-Film and Comet Film
September 30, 2004	Süperseks	Germany	distribution only; produced by Magnolia Filmproduktion, Valerian Film, Studio Babelsberg Motion Pictures and Zweites Deutsches Fernsehen
October 6, 2004	Le Carton	France	co-production with Source Films
October 27, 2004	A Very Long Engagement	France	co-production with 2003 Productions, Tapioca Films and TF1 Films Production distributed in North America by Warner Independent Pictures
November 10, 2004	Dogora: Ouvrons les yeux	France	theatrical distribution only; produced by Epithète Films and Zoulou Films
November 17, 2004	Tow Truck Pluck	Netherlands	distribution only; produced by Bos Bros. Film-TV Productions and AVRO
December 17, 2004	Xuxa e o Tesouro da Cidade Perdida	Brazil	co-production with Globo Filmes, Diler & Associados and Xuxa Produções

== 2005 ==
Release Date	Title	Country	Notes
January 28, 2005	When Luck Breaks the Door	Turkey	theatrical distribution only; produced by Öger Productions and Böcek Yapım
February 2, 2005	The Ex-Wife of My Life	France	co-production with Ice 3 and Josy Films
February 2, 2005	Lepel	Netherlands	distribution only; produced by Lemming Film, Egoli Tossell Film, Zephyr Films and NPS
March 17, 2005	Skřítek	Czech Republic	distribution only; produced by Vorel Film and Studio Mirage
March 18, 2005	Habana Blues	Spain	distribution in Spain, Portugal, Latin America and Italy only; produced by Maestranza Films, Instituto Cubano del Arte e Industria Cinematográficos and Pyramide Productions
March 30, 2005	L'Antidote	France	distribution only; produced by Les Films Christian Fechner and France 2 Cinéma
April 8, 2005	Queens	Spain	co-production with Lucky Red and Fortissimo Films
April 29, 2005	L'uomo perfetto	Italy	distribution only; produced by Cattleya
April 29, 2005	La Ultima Noche	Mexico	co-distribution with Videocine only; produced by Coyoacán Films
September 2, 2005	Chick Thing	Brazil	co-production with Diler & Associados and SBT Filmes
September 8, 2005	Be with Me	Singapore	distribution only; produced by Zhao Wei Films
September 28, 2005	Grey Souls	France	French and Belgian distribution only; produced by Epithète Films and France 2 Cinéma
September 29, 2005	The Little Polar Bear 2: The Mysterious Island	Germany	distribution under Warner Bros. Family Entertainment only; co-production with Rothkirch Cartoon-Film and MaBo Filmproduktion
September 30, 2005	Romanzo Criminale	Italy	Italian and French distribution only; produced by Cattleya and Babe Films
October 12, 2005	Winky's Horse	Netherlands	distribution in the Netherlands, Belgium and Swedish/Norwegian home video only; produced by Bos Bros. Film-TV Productions, MMG Film & TV Production and AVRO
December 7, 2005	Gruesome School Trip	Netherlands	distribution only; produced by Bos Bros. Film-TV Productions and AVRO
December 25, 2005	Xuxinha e Guto contra os Monstros do Espaço	Brazil	co-production with Diler & Associados, Xuxa Produções, Labocine and Globo Filmes

== 2006 ==
Release Date	Title	Country	Notes
January 5, 2006	The Thief Lord	Germany	distribution in Germany, Austria, the U.K. and Ireland under Warner Bros. Family Entertainment only; co-production with Comet Film, Delux Productions and Future Films
February 1, 2006	French Fried Vacation 3	France	theatrical distribution only; produced by Les Films Christian Fechner
February 3, 2006	The Bodyguard's Cure	Italy	distribution only; produced by Colorado Film
March 17, 2006	Volver	Spain	Spanish theatrical and Italian distribution only; produced by El Deseo
April 7, 2006	Alien Autopsy	United Kingdom	distribution only; produced by Ealing Studios and Fragile Films
April 21, 2006	Remake	Spain	distribution only; produced by Ovídeo TV and Patagonik Film Group
April 29, 2006	Catch a Wave	Japan	
May 25, 2006	Pan's Labyrinth	Spain	Spanish and Latin American distribution only; produced by Estudios Picasso, Tequila Gang, Esperanto Filmoj and Sententia Entertainment
June 17, 2006	Death Note	Japan	theatrical distribution only; co-production with Nippon Television
June 21, 2006	L'Entente Cordiale	France	distribution only; produced by Les Films Christian Fechner and France 2 Cinéma
July 8, 2006	Brave Story	Japan	distribution only; produced by Gonzo
August 4, 2006	Zuzu Angel	Brazil	distribution only; produced by Globo Filmes, Toscana Audiovisual and Lereby Produções
September 15, 2006	Salvador	Spain	theatrical distribution only; produced by Future Films
September 1, 2006	Efectos secundarios	Mexico	co-production with Videocine
September 21, 2006	The Trip to Panama	Germany	distribution under Warner Bros. Family Entertainment only; co-production with Rothkirch Cartoon-Film, Papa Löwe Filmproduktion and MABO Pictures Filmproduktion
November 3, 2006	Death Note 2: The Last Name	Japan	theatrical distribution only; co-production with Nippon Television
December 12, 2006	The Ugly Duckling and Me!	Germany	distribution under Warner Bros. Family Entertainment only; produced by A. Film A/S, Magma Films, TV2 Denmark and Futurikon
December 15, 2006	Xuxa Gêmeas	Brazil	co-production with Globo Filmes, Diler & Associados, 20th Century Fox and Xuxa Produções; distributed by 20th Century Fox

== 2007 ==
Release Date	Title	Country	Notes
February 1, 2007	Eight Miles High	Germany	distribution only; produced by Babelsberg Film, Neue Bioskop Film, On the Road and Babelsberg Studio
February 2, 2007	Miguel y William	Spain	distribution only; produced by Zebra Producciones
March 8, 2007	Rudy: The Return of the Racing Pig	Germany	distribution under Warner Bros. Family Entertainment only; produced by Relevant Film, ARD and WDR
March 9, 2007	Ho voglia di te	Italy	distribution only; produced by Cattleya
April 20, 2007	My Brother Is an Only Child	Italy	distribution only; produced by Cattleya and Babe Films
April 27, 2007	I Love Miami	Spain	distribution only; produced by Producciones X Marca
May 10, 2007	Two Times Lotte	Germany	distribution under Warner Bros. Family Entertainment only; co-production with Trickompany Filmproduktion and Lunaris Film- und Fernsehproduktion
June 22, 2007	Thieves	Spain	distribution only; produced by Pentagrama Films, Telecinco Cinema and Maestranza Films
September 10, 2007	The Orphanage	Spain	distribution only; produced by Rodar y Rodar and Telecinco Cinema
September 28, 2007	Mrs Ratcliffe's Revolution	United Kingdom	distribution only; produced by Assassin Films, Pioneer Pictures and UK Film Council
September 28, 2007	O Homem Que Desafiou o Diabo	Brazil	distribution only; produced by Globo Filmes, L.C Barreto Produções and Cinematográficas
October 10, 2007	Where Is Winky's Horse?	Netherlands	distribution in the Netherlands, Belgium and Swedish/Norwegian home video only; produced by Bos Bros. Film-TV Productions, MMG Film & TV Production and AVRO
October 26, 2007	Days and Clouds	Italy	distribution only; produced by Lumiere & Co, Amka Films and RTSI Televisione svizzera
November 9, 2007	Suso's Tower	Spain	distribution only; produced by Mediapro
December 5, 2007	The Red Inn	France	distribution only; produced by Les Films Christian Fechner
December 20, 2007	Rabbit Without Ears	Germany	co-production with Barefoot Films and SevenPictures Film
December 21, 2007	Sultans of South	Mexico	distribution only; produced by Salamandra Films, Castelao Producciones and Filmax
December 21, 2007	Xuxa em Sonho de Menina	Brazil	co-production with PlayArte Conspiraçao Filmes and Globo Filmes

== 2008 ==
Release Date	Title	Country	Notes
January 1, 2008	Little Dodo	Germany	distribution under Warner Bros. Family Entertainment only; co-production with Rothkirch Cartoon-Film and Comet Film
January 10, 2008	Berlin by the Sea	Germany	distribution only; produced by Alin Filmproduktion and Red Cloud Filmproduktion
January 18, 2008	The Oxford Murders	Spain	Spanish and Italian distribution only; produced by Telecinco Cinema and Tornasol Films
February 9, 2008	L: Change the World	Japan	theatrical distribution only; co-production with Nippon Television
February 13, 2008	The Maiden and the Wolves	France	distribution only; produced by Epithète Films, France 3 Cinéma, France 2 Cinéma and Auvergne-Rhône-Alpes Cinéma
April 3, 2008	Love, Soccer and Other Catastrophes	Italy	distribution only; produced by Cattleya
April 10, 2008	The Red Baron	Germany	distribution only; produced by Niama Film
April 11, 2008	Chef's Special	Spain	distribution only; produced by Canguro Films
April 16, 2008	Passe-passe	France	distribution only; produced by Tabo Tabo Films
April 19, 2008	Sushi King Goes to New York	Japan	theatrical distribution only; produced by Office Crescendo, Dentsu and TV Asahi
April 28, 2008	Morrison Gets a Baby Sister	Netherlands	distribution only; produced by Bos Bros. Film-TV Productions and AVRO
June 25, 2008	2 Alone in Paris	France	distribution only; produced by Trésor Films
June 25, 2008	Hoe overleef ik mezelf?	Netherlands	distribution only; produced by Bos Bros. Film-TV Productions and NPS
August 2, 2008	The Sky Crawlers	Japan	theatrical distribution only; co-production with Production I.G, Polygon Pictures and NTV
August 20, 2008	The Girl from Monaco	France	distribution only; produced by Canal+ and Soudaine Compagnie
September 19, 2008	Saas Bahu Aur Sensex	India	distribution only; produced by PLA Entertainment
September 26 2008	My Prison Yard	Spain	distribution only; produced by El Deseo
October 9, 2008	U-900	Germany	distribution only; produced by Wiedemann & Berg Filmproduktion
October 10, 2008	Sexykiller	Spain	co-production with Mediapro and Antena 3 Films
October 17, 2008	Under the Salt	Mexico	distribution only; produced by Películas Imaginarias
October 25, 2008	Ichi	Japan	theatrical distribution only; co-production with Tokyo Broadcasting System, Geneon Entertainment, Sedic International, Dentsu, Lawson Ticket, Kodansha, Mainichi Broadcasting System, Horipro, Asahi Shimbun and Oxybot
October 28, 2008	Mustafa	Turkey	theatrical distribution only; produced by NTV
October 31, 2008	We Can Do That	Italy	distribution only; produced by Rizzoli Film and RTI
November 14, 2008	Navidad S.A.	Mexico	co-distribution with Videocine only; produced by Lemon Studios and Salamandra Films
November 19, 2008	A Day at the Museum	France	distribution only; produced by Epithète Films, Mon Voisin Productions and France 3 Cinéma
November 28, 2008	Solo un padre	Italy	distribution only; produced by Cattleya
December 6, 2008	252: Signal of Life	Japan	theatrical distribution only; co-production with Nippon Television
December 18, 2008	1½ Knights: In Search of the Ravishing Princess Herzelinde	Germany	co-production with Barefoot Films, Lionheart Entertainment and SevenPictures Film
December 25, 2008	Buddenbrooks	Germany	distribution only; produced by Bavaria Film

== 2009 ==
Release Date	Title	Country	Notes
January 16, 2009	Chandni Chowk to China	India	co-production with Ramesh Sippy Entertainment and People Tree Entertainment
February 6, 2009	The Secret of Moonacre	United Kingdom	distribution only; produced by Velvet Octopus, UK Film Council, Forgan-Smith Entertainment, Spice Factory, LWH Films, Eurofilm Stúdió, Davis Films, Grand Allure Entertainment and Aramid Entertainment
February 26, 2009	Killing Is My Business, Honey	Germany	co-production with Rat Pack Filmproduktion
March 12, 2009	Hilde	Germany	distribution only; produced by Egoli Tossell Film, MMC Independent and Pictorion Pictures
March 18, 2009	Broken Embraces	Spain	Spanish theatrical and Italian distribution only; produced by El Deseo
March 27, 2009	I mostri oggi	Italy	distribution only; produced by Colorado Film and Dean Film
April 8, 2009	Road to Santiago	Spain	distribution only; produced by Antena 3 Films, Lazona, and Zircozine
April 10, 2009	Tutta colpa di Giuda	Italy	distribution only; produced by Rossofuoco and Fargo Film
April 17, 2009	Invitation Only	Taiwan	theatrical distribution only; produced by Three Dots Entertainment
April 17, 2009	Insignificant Things	Mexico	distribution only; produced by Tequila Gang, Manga Films and Media Films
April 18, 2009	Oppai Volleyball	Japan	theatrical co-distribution with Toei only; produced by Avex Entertainment
April 22, 2009	Coco Before Chanel	France	distribution in France, Latin America, Spain, Germany, Austria, Italy, Japan, Australia and New Zealand only; produced by Haut et Court, Ciné-@ and France 2 Cinéma
April 30, 2009	Phantom Pain	Germany	co-production with Film1, Barefoot Films and Neue Bioskop Film
May 1, 2009	Goemon	Japan	co-distribution with Shochiku only
August 28, 2009	I Do ... Knot	Mexico	distribution only; produced by Hispana de Producción and Second Try Films
September 1, 2009	Summer Wars	Japan	theatrical distribution only; produced by Madhouse
September 7, 2009	The Story of Me	Brazil	distribution only; produced by Ramalho Filmes
September 18, 2009	The Firm	United Kingdom	distribution only; produced by Vertigo Films
September 24, 2009	Laura's Star and the Mysterious Dragon Nian	Germany	distribution under Warner Bros. Family Entertainment only; co-production with Rothkirch Cartoon-Film, 3D Animagics Entertainment and Comet Film
October 9, 2009	Men in the City	Germany	distribution only; produced by Wiedemann & Berg Filmproduktion
October 28, 2009	Micmacs	France	distribution only; produced by Epithéte Films, Tapioca Films and France 3 Cinéma
November 19, 2009	Beloved Berlin Wall	Germany	distribution only; produced by Relevant Film and Tradewind Pictures
November 26, 2009	Helen	Germany	distribution only; produced by Egoli Tossell Film and Insight Film Studios
December 3, 2009	Rabbit Without Ears 2	Germany	co-production with Barefoot Films and SevenPictures Film
December 12, 2009	Mega Monster Battle: Ultra Galaxy Legend	Japan	theatrical distribution only; produced by Tsuburaya Productions
December 18, 2009	12 Paces Without a Head	Germany	co-production with Wüste Film and Magnolia Filmproduktion
December 23, 2009	The Last Station	Germany	distribution only; produced by Egoli Tossell Film, Zephyr Films, The Andrei Konchalovsky Production Center and SamFilm

== See also ==
- List of Warner Bros. theatrical animated feature films
- List of Warner Bros. films (2000–2009)
