= Matthias Lechner =

German production designer and art director

- Born: Matthias F. Lechner; 1970 (age 55–56); Mannheim, Baden-Württemberg, West Germany
- Known for: art director production designer set designer
- Notable work: Help! I'm a Fish; Laura's Star; Zootopia; The Sea Beast (2022 film)

Matthias Florian Lechner (born 1970) is a motion picture production designer and art director. He worked as an art director and designer on the animated films Zootopia, Help! I'm a Fish and Escape from Planet Earth, as well as Laura's Star, among other films. He was born in Mannheim, Germany, and lives in Ventura, California.

== Filmography ==
=== Art director ===
- Ralph Breaks the Internet
- Zootopia
- Escape from Planet Earth
- Space Chimps
- Werner - gekotzt wird später
- Help! I'm a Fish

=== Set designer/Workbook ===
- No-Eared Bunny and Two-Eared Chick
- Laura's Star and the Dream Monsters
- Laura's Star and the Mysterious Dragon Nian
- Kleiner Dodo
- The Little Polar Bear 2: The Mysterious Island
- Laura's Star
- Globi and the Stolen Shadows
- Troll Story
- Karlsson on the Roof - TV
- Derrick – Die Pflicht ruft
- Ottifants - Das Gold des Stoertebecker
- Pippi Longstocking

=== Co-Director ===
- Junior TV

=== Layout-Supervisor ===
- Quest for Camelot
- Werner: Eat My Dust!!!
- Ottifants TV'

=== Layout-Artist ===
- Jungledyret Hugo 2
- Felidae

=== Background-Painter ===
- Der kleene Punker
