= Laura's Star =

Laura's Star may refer to:

- Lauras Stern (Laura's Star), a German children's book series
- Laura's Star (2004 film), a German animated feature film, based on the children's book
- Laura's Star (2021 film), a German film, a live-action remake of the 2004 film

== See also ==
- Laura's Star and the Mysterious Dragon Nian, a 2009 sequel to the 2004 film
- Laura's Star and the Dream Monsters, a 2011 sequel to the 2004 film
