= Man Arenas =

European-American production designer

- Born: Jacinto Manuel Arenas Cofiño; 1966 (age 59–60); Brussels, Belgium
- Known for: Production designer Cartoonist
- Notable work: Yaxin the faun The Gruffalo; Laura's Star
- Awards: Révélation – Festival B.D. Sollies-Ville; 2010 Yaxin et le Faune
- Website: manarenas.com dodecaden.com

Man Arenas is an animation production designer, art director and comic book illustrator. Currently working at Netflix, he has previously worked as a production designer on Help! I'm a Fish, The Gruffalo, and Laura's Star, among others. He was born in Brussels BE, and lives in Burbank, CA.

== Background ==
Man Arenas started his career in Brussels in 1988, working for the animation company S.E.P.P. in the visual development department for several animated TV series related to the most famous comic book characters. Since then, he has worked on many animated feature films for companies such as Warner Bros. Family Entertainment, A. Film A/S, Thilo Rothkirch Cartoon Film, Vanguard Animation or Studio Soi.

== Filmography ==
=== Production Designer ===
- Laura's Star
- The Gruffalo
- The Shark and the Piano
- The Little Polar Bear 2 – The Mysterious Island

=== Art director ===
- Kleiner Dodo

=== Set and Character designer/Workbook ===
- The Gruffalo
- Help! I'm a Fish
- Space Chimps
- Laura's Star
- Derrick – Die Pflicht ruft
- Laura's Star in China
- Kleiner Dodo
- The Little Polar Bear 2 – The Mysterious Island
- Werner - gekotzt wird später
- Ottifants - Das Gold des Stoertebecker

=== Layout-Artist ===
- Help! I'm a Fish
- Laura's Star
- The Abrafaxe – Under The Black Flag

=== Background-Painter ===
- The Gruffalo (film)
