= Serafín (TV series) =

- Genre: Telenovela
- Written by: Carlos Daniel González; Ricardo Fiallega; Janely Lee
- Directed by: Salvador Sánchez; Manolo García
- Starring: Enrique Rocha; Maribel Guardia; Eduardo Santamarina; Guillermo García Cantú; Rafael Rojas; María Fernanda Morales; Jordi Landeta
- Opening theme: "Está en ti" by Marco Antonio Solís
- Composer: Alejandro Zepeda
- Country of origin: Mexico
- Original language: Spanish
- No. of episodes: 80

Production
- Executive producer: José Alberto Castro
- Producer: Ernesto Hernández
- Editors: Juan Ordóñez; Héctor Flores; Alejandro Iglesias
- Production company: Televisa

Original release
- Network: Canal de las Estrellas
- Release: August 30 – December 17, 1999

Related
- Serafín: La película (2001)

Serafín, is a Mexican telenovela fused with 3D animation for any characters produced by José Alberto Castro for Televisa in 1999.

Maribel Guardia, Eduardo Santamarina, María Fernanda Morales and Jordi Landeta star as the main protagonists, while Guillermo García Cantú and Enrique Rocha as the main antagonists. A film sequel to the series was released in 2001.

== Plot ==
Serafín is a happy and good-natured angel, with one small flaw: he is very mischievous. One day in Heaven he gets into so much trouble that he is sent to Earth to learn how to be a Guardian Angel. When he arrives on earth, Serafín is very frightened by what he sees, and not knowing what to do, he finds refuge and help in an old abandoned house in Mexico City. Once there, Serafín meets Pepe, a very unhappy boy, who lives with his mother Carmen, his grandfather Joaquin, and his abusive stepfather Raul. Serafín is determined to bring happiness into Pepe's life and becomes his Guardian Angel. Together they learn great life lessons and experience the most incredible adventures.

Pepe and Serafín are put to the test when a mysterious man and his two companions move into the abandoned house. No one suspects that the man is Lucio Fernández, a dark agent of the devil. Lucio's mission is to wipe every scrap of love from the face of the Earth, and he is prepared to destroy any angel or child who dares to cross his path, for they are the embodiment of innocence, friendship and love. As time goes by, Lucio employs every villain on earth in order to accomplish his mission. Only the love, perseverance, friendship and affection of Pepe and his friends, guided by Serafín, can save the day.

== Cast ==
- Maribel Guardia as Carmen Quiñones de Salgado
- Eduardo Santamarina as Miguel Armendariz
- Jordi Landeta as Pepe Salgado Quiñones
- Maria Fernanda Morales as Serafín (voice)
- Jacqueline Andere as Alma de la Luz
- Enrique Rocha as Lucio Fernández
- Pedro Armendáriz Jr. as Pensador (voice)
- German Robles as Don Baúl (voice)
- Carmen Montejo as Gigi (voice)
- Evita Muñoz "Chachita" as Coco (voice)
- Polo Ortín as Tacho (voice)
- Patricio Castillo as Krako (voice)
- Jorge Van Rankin as Pomin (voice)
- Guillermo García Cantú as Raúl Salgado
- Alejandra Obregón as Helga de Armendariz
- Rafael Rojas as Enrique
- Mónica Dossetti as Edith
- Eduardo Rodríguez as Bernal
- Jessica Salazar as Marcela Fernandez
- Adrián Vázquez as Jacobo
- Eduardo Rivera as Juancho
- Marisol Centeno as Angélica
- Miguel Pizarro as Joaquín
- Miguel Galván as Roque
- Aída Pierce as Bárbara
- Daniel Arevalo as Javier
- Mariana Botas as Ana
- José Roberto Lozano as Eddy
- Paulina Martell as Lulú
- Jorge Arizmendi as Pancho
- Yurem Rojas as Cachito
- Eduardo Vaughan as Guampi
- María Alicia Delgado as Cachita
- Rosita Pelayo as Sandy
- Sergio DeFassio as Reintegro
- Luis Xavier as David
- Arlette Pacheco as Raquel
- Javier Herranz as Dany
- María Morena as Cecilia
- Alicia Montoya as Cruz
- Alejandra Meyer as Felicitas
- Ana Luisa Peluffo as Abuela Esther
- Juan Carlos Nava as Calixto Meneses
- Martha Mijares as Nena Gamba
- Julio Vega as Aníbal
- Horacio Almada as Lombardo
- Manuel Benítez as Lalo
- Andrés Bonfiglio as Chaparro
- Álvaro Carcaño asEvelio
- Eugenio Derbez as Lonje Moco
- Consuelo Duval as Lupe

== Soundtrack ==
Serafín (Música Original de la Telenovela)

Soundtrack album by Various artists
- Released: 1999
- Length: 35:13
- Label: Fonovisa

No.	Title	Performer(s)	Length
1.	"Está En Ti"	Marco Antonio Solís	3:54
2.	"El Ángel De La Guarda"	Noelia	2:08
3.	"Lucio El Malo"	Enrique Rocha	3:01
4.	"¿Dónde Estás Papá?"	Jordi Landeta	4:20
5.	"La Lámpara Coco"	Evita Muñoz	4:10
6.	"La Pelota"	Sparx	2:52
7.	"Pequeño Amigo"	Maribel Guardia	4:42
8.	"La Gárgola Krako"	Enrique Rocha	2:21
9.	"Tacho"	Gustavo Lima	3:44
10.	"Imaginar"	Marco Antonio Solís	4:01
Total length:			35:13

== Accolades ==
Year	Award	Category	Nominated	Result	Ref
2000	Premios Bravo	Best Children's Producer	José Alberto Castro	Won	
2000	Premios Bravo	Best Characterization of a Villain	Enrique Rocha	Won	
