= Laura's Star (2021 film) =

German film

- German theatrical release poster
- Directed by: Joya Thome
- Written by: Claudia Seibl
- Based on: Lauras Stern by: Klaus Baumgart; Laura's Star; by Michael Mädel; Piet De Rycker
- Produced by: Maya Gräfin Rothkirch; Christian Becker
- Starring: Emilia Kowalski; Michel Johann Koch; Jonas May; Luise Heyer; Ludwig Trepte
- Cinematography: Daniela Knapp
- Edited by: Jamin Benazzouz
- Music by: Hans Zimmer; Nick Glennie-Smith; Henning Lohner
- Production companies: Westside Filmproduktion; Rothkirch Cartoon-Film; Warner Bros. Film Productions Germany
- Distributed by: Warner Bros. Pictures
- Release date: 9 December 2021
- Running time: 79 minutes
- Country: Germany
- Language: German
- Box office: $1,182,221

Laura's Star (German: Lauras Stern) is a 2021 German film directed by Joya Thome. It is a live-action remake of the 2004 animated film Laura's Star, based on the book series by Klaus Baumgart.

== Cast ==
- Emilia Kowalski as Laura
- Michel Johann Koch as Tommy
- Jonas May as Max
- Luise Heyer as Mama
- Ludwig Trepte as Papa

== Release ==
=== Home media ===
The film was released on Blu-ray and DVD on 12 May 2022 by Warner Bros. Home Entertainment. As of 2024, the film occasionally available on Warner Bros. Discovery's Max and Netflix.
