= Nick Glennie-Smith =

English composer and conductor (1951–2026)

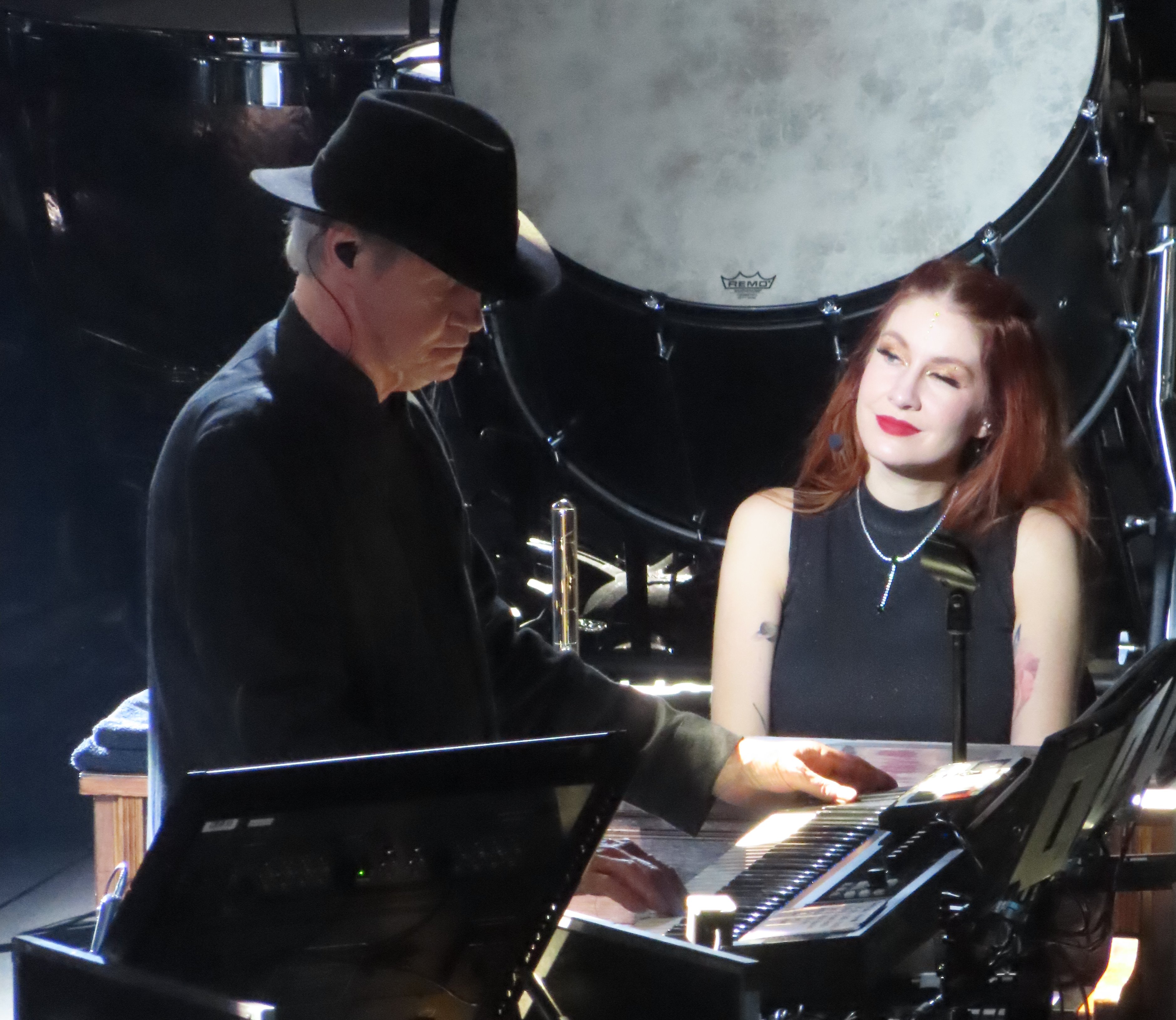
- Glennie-Smith (left) and Molly Rogers in 2023

Background information
- Born: Nicholas Hugh Glennie-Smith; 3 October 1951; London, England
- Died: 16 August 2026 (aged 74) Charlottesville, Virginia, U.S.
- Genres: Progressive rock; rock
- Occupations: Musician; composer; conductor
- Instruments: Keyboards; guitar
- Years active: 1975–2026

Nicholas Hugh Glennie-Smith (3 October 1951 – 16 August 2026) was an English film score composer, conductor and musician, who was a frequent collaborator with Hans Zimmer, contributing to scores including The Rock (nominated for the Academy Award for Best Sound), the 2006 historical film Children of Glory and the 1993 spy thriller Point of No Return. Glennie-Smith also composed the scores for the films Home Alone 3 (1997), The Man in the Iron Mask (1998), We Were Soldiers (2002), Secretariat (2010), the score for the Disney direct-to-video animated film The Lion King II: Simba's Pride (1998), Lauras Stern (2004), The Little Polar Bear 2: The Mysterious Island and A Sound of Thunder (both 2005).

Glennie-Smith was a part of Hans Zimmer's film score company Remote Control Productions, for which he conducted music for the soundtracks on Transformers (2007–2017), X-Men: First Class and Pirates of the Caribbean: On Stranger Tides (both 2011). He was Zimmer's accompanist on the score for Man of Steel (2013).

He was the master composer of the music in the French theme park le Puy du Fou. He collaborated with the former Pink Floyd bassist, Roger Waters. He worked on Waters' score for the 1986 film When the Wind Blows, then provided some of the keyboard overdubbing for the song "The Powers that Be" on Waters' 1987 Radio K.A.O.S. album. He performed at the 1990 concert The Wall Live in Berlin as a keyboardist alongside Peter Wood. He also toured in the 1980s with Cliff Richard, again playing keyboards. In 1987, he was responsible, with producer Vic Coppersmith-Heaven and singer Kenny Young, for the album Transmissions under the group name Gentlemen Without Weapons.

== Life and musical career ==
Nicholas Hugh Glennie-Smith was born in London on 3 October 1951. In 1975, he started his musical career with the band Wally, performing keyboards on their second album, Valley Gardens. In 1980, he played keyboards on Leo Sayer's album Living in a Fantasy. Also in 1980, he started recording and touring with Cliff Richard, appearing on three albums, I'm No Hero (synthesizer), Wired for Sound (engineer, piano on one song), and The Rock Connection (synthesizer on one song).

Glennie-Smith is also known for his contributions to Roger Daltrey's solo albums, Under a Raging Moon (1985), and Can't Wait to See the Movie (1987), and Paul McCartney's solo albums Press to Play (1986), and Flowers in the Dirt (1989).

He also worked with many other artists including Phil Collins, Tina Turner, Elvis Costello, Pharrell Williams, Nik Kershaw, Duane Eddy, Katrina & the Waves, and The Adventures.

Glennie-Smith died in Charlottesville, Virginia on 16 August 2026, at the age of 74.

== Filmography ==
=== As primary composer ===
Year	Title	Director(s)	Studio(s)	Notes
1996	Two If by Sea	Bill Bennett	Morgan Creek Productions; Warner Bros. Pictures	
1996	The Rock	Michael Bay	Hollywood Pictures	with Hans Zimmer & Harry Gregson-Williams
1997	Fire Down Below	Félix Enríquez Alcalá	Warner Bros. Pictures	—N/a
1997	Home Alone 3	Raja Gosnell	20th Century Fox	—N/a
1997	Cyclops, Baby	D. J. Caruso	Touchstone Pictures	Short film
1998	The Man in the Iron Mask	Randall Wallace	Metro-Goldwyn-Mayer; United Artists	—N/a
1998	The Lion King II: Simba's Pride	Darrell Rooney	Walt Disney Studios Home Entertainment; DisneyToon Studios	Direct-to-video film
1998	Max Q	Michael Shapiro	Touchstone Television; ABC	Television film
1999	Michelle Kwan Skates to Disney's Greatest Hits	Steve Binder	ABC Family	Television film. Reuses music from The Jungle Book (1967), The Aristocats (1970), The Little Mermaid (1989), Aladdin (1992), Hocus Pocus (1993), The Lion King (1994), Hercules (1997), Mulan (1998), and The Lion King II: Simba's Pride (1998).
2000	Highlander: Endgame	Doug Aarniokoski	Dimension Films	with Stephen Graziano
2001	Attila	Dick Lowry	Alphaville Films	Gerard Butler
2002	We Were Soldiers	Randall Wallace	Paramount Pictures	—N/a
2004	Ella Enchanted	Tommy O'Haver	Miramax Films	—N/a
2004	Laura's Star	Piet De Rycker; Thilo Rothkirch	Warner Bros. Pictures	with Hans Zimmer and Henning Lohner
2005	A Sound of Thunder	Peter Hyams	Warner Bros. Pictures	—N/a
2005	The Little Polar Bear 2 – The Mysterious Island	Piet De Rycker; Thilo Rothkirch	Warner Bros. Pictures; Rothkirch Cartoon Film	with Hans Zimmer
2006	Children of Glory	Krisztina Goda	C2 Pictures	—N/a
2010	Secretariat	Randall Wallace	Walt Disney Pictures	—N/a
2013	A Belfast Story	Nathan Todd	Adnuco Pictures	—N/a
2014	Heaven Is for Real	Randall Wallace	TriStar Pictures	—N/a
2021	Laura's Star	Joya Thome	Warner Bros. Pictures	with Hans Zimmer and Henning Lohner

=== With others ===
Year	Title	Director(s)	Composer(s)	Role
1986	When the Wind Blows	Jimmy T. Murakami	Roger Waters	Musician: Synthesizers
1990	Rosencrantz & Guildenstern Are Dead	Tom Stoppard	Stanley Myers	Musician: Synthesizers
1991	Cold Heaven	Nicolas Roeg	Stanley Myers	Musician: Synthesizers
1991	K2	Franc Roddam	Hans Zimmer; Chaz Jankel	Composer of Additional Music
1993	Calendar Girl	John Whitesell	Hans Zimmer	Composer of Additional Music
1993	Cool Runnings	Jon Turteltaub	Hans Zimmer	Orchestrator & Composer of Additional Music
1993	The House of the Spirits	Bille August	Hans Zimmer	Orchestrator & Musician: Piano
1994	Monkey Trouble	Franco Amurri	Mark Mancina	Composer of Additional Music
1994	The Lion King	Roger Allers Rob Minkoff	Hans Zimmer	Choral Conductor & Composer of Additional Music
1994	Renaissance Man	Penny Marshall	Hans Zimmer	Orchestrator & Composer of Additional Music
1994	Drop Zone	John Badham	Hans Zimmer	Composer of Additional Music
1995	Bad Boys	Michael Bay	Mark Mancina	Composer of Additional Music
1995	Crimson Tide	Tony Scott	Hans Zimmer	Orchestrator & Conductor
1995	Beyond Rangoon	John Boorman	Hans Zimmer	Conductor & Composer of Additional Music
1995	Two Deaths	Nicolas Roeg	Hans Zimmer	Conductor
1995	Nine Months	Chris Columbus	Hans Zimmer	Composer of Additional Music
1996	The Preacher's Wife	Penny Marshall	Hans Zimmer	Composer of Additional Music
1997	Smilla's Sense of Snow	Bille August	Harry Gregson-Williams; Hans Zimmer	Composer of Additional Music
2000	The Tigger Movie	Jun Falkenstein	Harry Gregson-Williams	Conductor
2000	Mission: Impossible 2	John Woo	Hans Zimmer	Musician: Synthesizers
2001	Just Visiting	Jean-Marie Poiré	John Powell	Composer of Additional Music
2002	D-Tox	Jim Gillespie	John Powell	Composer of Additional Music
2002	The New Guy	Ed Decter	Ralph Sall	Composer of Additional Music
2003	Pirates of the Caribbean: The Curse of the Black Pearl	Gore Verbinski	Klaus Badelt; Hans Zimmer	Composer of Additional Music
2004	Thunderbirds	Jonathan Frakes	Ramin Djawadi; Hans Zimmer	Conductor
2004	King Arthur	Antoine Fuqua	Hans Zimmer	Conductor & Composer of Additional Music
2006	The Da Vinci Code	Ron Howard	Hans Zimmer	Choral Conductor & Composer of Additional Music
2006	Pirates of the Caribbean: Dead Man's Chest	Gore Verbinski	Hans Zimmer	Conductor & Composer of Additional Music
2006	Déjà Vu	Tony Scott	Harry Gregson-Williams	Conductor & Composer of Additional Music
2007	Pirates of the Caribbean: At World's End	Gore Verbinski	Hans Zimmer	Conductor & Composer of Additional Music
2007	Transformers	Michael Bay	Steve Jablonsky	Conductor
2007	License to Wed	Ken Kwapis	Christophe Beck	Conductor
2007	The Simpsons Movie	David Silverman	Hans Zimmer	Conductor
2008	Vantage Point	Pete Travis	Atli Örvarsson	Conductor
2008	The Forbidden Kingdom	Rob Minkoff	David Buckley	Conductor
2008	Beverly Hills Chihuahua	Raja Gosnell	Heitor Pereira	Conductor
2009	Angels & Demons	Ron Howard	Hans Zimmer	Conductor
2009	Imagine That	Karey Kirkpatrick	Mark Mancina	Conductor
2009	Surrogates	Jonathan Mostow	Richard Marvin	Conductor
2009	It's Complicated	Nancy Meyers	Hans Zimmer; Heitor Pereira	Conductor
2009	Transformers: Revenge of the Fallen	Michael Bay	Steve Jablonsky	Conductor
2010	A Nightmare on Elm Street	Samuel Bayer	Steve Jablonsky	Conductor
2010	You Again	Andy Fickman	Nathan Wang	Conductor
2010	How Do You Know	James L. Brooks	Hans Zimmer	Conductor
2011	Rango	Gore Verbinski	Hans Zimmer	Conductor
2011	Pirates of the Caribbean: On Stranger Tides	Rob Marshall	Hans Zimmer	Conductor
2011	A Little Bit of Heaven	Nicole Kassell	Heitor Pereira	Conductor
2011	Winnie the Pooh	Stephen Anderson Don Hall	Henry Jackman	Conductor
2011	X-Men: First Class	Matthew Vaughn	Henry Jackman	Conductor
2011	Your Highness	David Gordon Green	Steve Jablonsky	Conductor
2011	Transformers: Dark of the Moon	Michael Bay	Steve Jablonsky	Conductor
2012	Battleship	Peter Berg	Steve Jablonsky	Conductor
2012	Savages	Oliver Stone	Adam Peters	Conductor
2012	Wreck-It Ralph	Rich Moore	Henry Jackman	Conductor
2013	G.I. Joe: Retaliation	Jon M. Chu	Henry Jackman	Conductor
2013	This Is the End	Seth Rogen Evan Goldberg	Henry Jackman	Conductor
2013	Gangster Squad	Ruben Fleischer	Steve Jablonsky	Conductor
2013	Despicable Me 2	Pierre Coffin; Chris Renaud	Heitor Pereira; Pharrell Williams	Conductor
2013	Man of Steel	Zack Snyder	Hans Zimmer	Conductor
2013	The Lone Ranger	Gore Verbinski	Hans Zimmer	Conductor
2013	Pacific Rim	Guillermo del Toro	Ramin Djawadi	Conductor
2013	Captain Phillips	Paul Greengrass	Henry Jackman	Conductor
2014	Winter's Tale	Akiva Goldsman	Hans Zimmer; Rupert Gregson-Williams	Conductor
2014	300: Rise of an Empire	Zack Snyder	Junkie XL	Conductor
2014	The Amazing Spider-Man 2	Marc Webb	Hans Zimmer; Pharrell Williams; Johnny Marr; Mike Einziger; Junkie XL; Steve Mazzaro; Andrew Kawczynski	Conductor
2014	Million Dollar Arm	Craig Gillespie	A. R. Rahman	Conductor
2014	Transformers: Age of Extinction	Michael Bay	Steve Jablonsky	Conductor
2015	Run All Night	Jaume Collet-Serra	Junkie XL	Conductor
2015	Pixels	Chris Columbus	Henry Jackman	Conductor
2015	The Little Prince	Mark Osborne	Hans Zimmer; Richard Harvey	Conductor
2015	Black Mass	Scott Cooper	Junkie XL	Conductor
2016	Deadpool	Tim Miller	Junkie XL	Conductor
2016	Batman v Superman: Dawn of Justice	Zack Snyder	Hans Zimmer; Junkie XL	Conductor
2017	Fist Fight	Richie Keen	Dominic Lewis	Conductor
2017	Sandy Wexler	Steven Brill	Rupert Gregson-Williams	Conductor
2017	Pirates of the Caribbean: Dead Men Tell No Tales	Joachim Rønning; Espen Sandberg	Geoff Zanelli	Conductor
2017	Despicable Me 3	Pierre Coffin Kyle Balda	Heitor Pereira	Conductor
2017	Transformers: The Last Knight	Michael Bay	Steve Jablonsky	Conductor
2017	Hans Zimmer: Live in Prague	Tim Van Someren	Hans Zimmer	Musical director
2017	Geostorm	Dean Devlin	Lorne Balfe	Conductor
2017	Jumanji: Welcome to the Jungle	Jake Kasdan	Henry Jackman	Conductor
2018	Game Over, Man!	Kyle Newacheck	Steve Jablonsky	Conductor
2018	Smallfoot	Karey Kirkpatrick	Heitor Pereira	Conductor
2018	Goosebumps 2: Haunted Halloween	Ari Sandel	Dominic Lewis	Conductor
2018	Ralph Breaks the Internet	Rich Moore; Phil Johnston	Henry Jackman	Conductor
2018	Aquaman	James Wan	Rupert Gregson-Williams	Conductor
2019	Dark Phoenix	Simon Kinberg	Hans Zimmer	Conductor
2019	The Lion King	Jon Favreau	Hans Zimmer	Conductor
2019	Maleficent: Mistress of Evil	Joachim Rønning	Geoff Zanelli	Conductor
2019	Jumanji: The Next Level	Jake Kasdan	Henry Jackman	Conductor
2020	Bad Boys for Life	Adil El Arbi; Bilall Fallah	Lorne Balfe	Conductor
2020	Bloodshot	David S. F. Wilson	Steve Jablonsky	Conductor
2022	Minions: The Rise of Gru	Kyle Balda	Heitor Pereira	Booth Reader
2022	Bullet Train	David Leitch	Dominic Lewis	Conductor
2022	The Son	Florian Zeller	Hans Zimmer	Conductor
2022	Strange World	Don Hall	Henry Jackman	Conductor
2024	Despicable Me 4	Chris Renaud	Heitor Pereira	Booth Reader
2024	Dear Santa	Bobby Farrelly	Rupert Gregson-Williams	Booth Reader
2024	Mufasa: The Lion King	Barry Jenkins	Dave Metzger	Songs Conductor
2026	Jumanji: Open World	Jake Kasdan	Henry Jackman	Conductor, posthumous release
