= Tomoko Tane =

Japanese singer

Tomoko Tane (種ともこ, Tane Tomoko; born November 7, 1961) is a Japanese singer, songwriter, and arranger. She debuted in 1985 and has recorded various singles and albums. She sung "Mermaid in Blue" for the television film Sango-sho Densetsu: Aoi Umi no Erufii (Coral Reef Legend: Elfie of the Blue Sea). In 1990, her album Ureshii Hitokoto (うれしいひとこと) peaked at position five on the Japanese charts. She sang the opening song "Message #9" and credits track "Love Song" of the 1998 anime series Gasaraki. She also is the performer in "Rainbow Song", the ending theme to the Japanese dub of The Little Polar Bear.
