= Valley Gardens (album) =

Studio album by Wally
- Released: 1975
- Studio: Morgan Studios, London
- Genre: Rock
- Label: Atlantic
- Producer: Bob Harris, Wally

Wally chronology
Wally (1974)	Valley Gardens (1975)

Valley Gardens is an album by Wally. It carries on in a similar vein to their debut album, Wally, including a side-long track, "The Reason Why". Dispensing with the production skills of Rick Wakeman, this time around the album is produced by Bob Harris.

== Track listing ==
Side One
No.	Title	Writer(s)	Length
1.	"Valley Gardens"	Paul Gerrett, Pete Cosker	9:45
2.	"Nez Perce"	Roy Webber	5:05
3.	"The Mood I'm In"	Roy Webber	7:05

Side two
No.	Title	Length
1.	"The Reason Why": I. "Nolan" (Pete Sage, Roy Webber); II. "The Charge" (Nick Glennie-Smith, Pete Sage); III. "Disillusion" (Roy Webber)"	19:20

== Personnel ==
Wally

- Roy Webber – lead vocals, acoustic guitar
- Nick Glennie-Smith – keyboards, vocals
- Pete Sage – electric violin, bass guitar, mandolin
- Pete Cosker – lead electric and acoustic guitars, vocals, bass guitar
- Paul Middleton – lap steel guitar, bass guitar
- Roger Narraway – drums, percussion

Guests

- Ray Wherstein – saxophone
- Jan Glennie Smith – vocals (tracks 3 to 4.3)
- Madeline Bell – vocals

=== Production credits ===
- Produced by Bob Harris, Wally
- Engineered by Paul Tregurtha
- Recorded at Morgan Studios, London
