= Wally (album) =

Studio album by Wally
- Released: 1974
- Studios: Morgan Studios, London
- Genre: Progressive rock
- Label: Atlantic
- Producers: Bob Harris, Rick Wakeman

Wally chronology
Wally (1974)	Valley Gardens (1975)

Wally is the 1974 first album by the band Wally. While the band fitted broadly into the progressive rock category, there was more than a hint of country / rock about the album, especially with Paul Middleton's steel guitar. The album is very much of its time, and shows influences of The Byrds, Crosby, Stills & Nash and the like. Wally, produced by Bob Harris and Rick Wakeman was not a huge commercial success, but has gained and maintained a loyal following, to the extent that the album has recently been re-released on CD.

Roy Webber has returned to music after many years involved in his original profession of graphics, and recorded a new album with Will Jackson in 2006.

The track "The Martyr" was released as a single in 1975.

== Track listing ==
Side one

1. "The Martyr" (Paul Gerrett) – 8:05
2. "I Just Wanna Be a Cowboy" (Roy Webber) – 4:09
3. "What to Do" (Roy Webber) – 7:38

Side two

1. "Sunday Walking Lady" (Roy Webber) – 2:45
2. "To the Urban Man" (Jim Slade, Roy Webber) – 13:58
3. "Your Own Way" (Alan Craig, Roy Webber, strings arranged by Bob Harris & Rick Wakeman) – 5:39

== Personnel ==
Wally

- Roy Webber – lead vocals, acoustic guitar
- Pete Cosker – lead electric and acoustic guitars, vocals, bass guitar
- Paul Gerrett – Fender Rhodes electric piano, Hammond organ, Mellotron, harmonium, grand piano, harpsichord, vocals
- Pete Sage – electric violin, bass guitar, mandolin
- Paul Middleton – lap steel guitar, bass guitar
- Roger Narraway – drums, percussion

=== Production credits ===
- Produced by Bob Harris, Rick Wakeman
- Engineered by Paul Tregurtha
- Recorded at Morgan Studios, London
- String arrangements on "Your Own Way" by Bob Harris, Rick Wakeman
