= Serafín: La película =

2001 film by René Cardona III

- Theatrical release poster
- Directed by: René Cardona III
- Written by: Xavier Robles
- Based on: Serafín by Xavier Robles
- Produced by: José Alberto Castro; Eckehardt Von Damm
- Starring: María Fernanda Morales; Jordi Landeta; Sherlyn
- Music by: Pablo Arellano
- Production company: Coyoacán Films
- Distributed by: Warner Bros. Pictures; Videocine
- Release date: July 13, 2001 (Mexico)
- Running time: 91 minutes
- Country: Mexico
- Language: Spanish

Serafín: La película, is a 2001 Mexican film written by Xavier Robles and directed by René Cardona III and was produced by Coyoácan Films and distributed by Warner Bros. Pictures under their Family Entertainment label. It is a sequel to the telenovela of Televisa Serafín produced by José Alberto Castro in 1999.

== Plot ==
Serafín, is the story of a small, kindly guardian angel who protects a group of children called "the gang".Together they will undertake an adventure side of strange characters and will face the evil Lucio, who is now accompanied by his girlfriend named flame.

== Cast ==
- María Fernanda Morales as Serafín (voice)
- Jordi Landeta as Pepe
- Sherlyn as Elisa
- Pedro Armendáriz Jr. as Thinker (voice)
- Nayeli Dainzú as Flama
- Consuelo Duval as Lindaflor (voice)
- Miguel Galván as Roque
- Roberto Navarro as Tomás
- Germán Robles as Don Baúl (voice)
- Enrique Rocha as Lucio
- Yurem Rojas as Cachito
- Jorge Van Rankin as Pomín (voice)
- Julio Vega as Aníbal
- Horacio Villalobos as Hongo #2
- Evita Muñoz as Coco (voice)
