= Wally (band) =

English progressive rock band

- Origin: Harrogate, England
- Genres: Progressive rock
- Years active: 1971–1976; 2008–2011
- Labels: Atlantic
- Members: Roy Webber; Nick Glennie-Smith; Will Jackson; Paul Middleton; Frank Mizen; Pete Sage; Phil Dean; Roger Narraway
- Past members: Alan Craig; Mike Smith; Paul Gerrett; Pete Cosker
- Website: wallymusic.co.uk

Wally was an English progressive rock band, led by the singer-songwriter Roy Webber, which originated in the early 1970s.

== Career ==
In 1973, after playing the northern pub rock circuit that included venues in Manchester, Harrogate, Leeds and Bradford, they entered a New Act competition organised by the music paper Melody Maker making it to the finals at London's Roundhouse. They did not win – that honour went to Druid – but they caught the eye of one of the judges, "Whispering" Bob Harris.

Their "runners-up" prize was the chance to record a session for Harris's BBC radio show, The Monday Program. He took the band under his wing and set up a recording contract with Atlantic Records. Their debut album, Wally (1974) was co-produced by Harris, along with Rick Wakeman who had seen one of the band's warm up gigs before the Roundhouse final.

After its release the band, now managed by Brian Lane, best known as the manager of Yes, embarked on a series of tours taking in most of Britain, Japan and the United States. They supported Yes at a headline London concert at the Alexandra Palace and also made an appearance on BBC's television music show The Old Grey Whistle Test in 1973.

On their second album, Valley Gardens (1975), Nick Glennie-Smith replaced Paul Gerrett on keyboards. However, by that time continual touring had taken its toll, and the band eventually split after Atlantic decided to cut their losses and pulled the plug.

In 1975, the band performed in Japan, as the backing band of French singer Michel Polnareff.

Webber set up a graphic design company, primarily working for Yorkshire Television but also with the Royal Armouries Museum. Violinist/bassist/mandolinist Pete Sage went to Germany to work as a sound engineer for the pop group Boney M. Keyboardist Nick Glennie-Smith was proposed as potential replacement for Rick Wakeman in Yes and went on to be a leading session musician and soundtrack composer. Guitarist Pete Cosker died in 1990, as a result of a heroin overdose. Drummer Roger Narraway metamorphosed into a talented lead guitarist, and Paul Middleton retreated to the North Yorkshire Dales, becoming a carpenter and venturing out occasionally to play with Roy Webber in a country rock band, Freddie Alva and the Men from Delmonte. He now gigs on a regular basis with his own band, 'The Angst Band', featuring fellow bandmember Frank Mizen on pedal steel, guitar and banjo. Paul Gerrett died of a heart attack in 2008.

After a thirty-year hiatus, the surviving members of the original line-up – augmented by Frank Mizen on pedal steel and Will Jackson on guitar – performed to a sell out crowd in April 2009 in their home town of Harrogate. A DVD of the concert was released later that year.

A third album, Montpellier (2010) comprising reworkings of demos from the band's earlier incarnation, along with new material by both Roy Webber and Paul Middleton, was released in February 2010, and a second "reunion" concert took place in April. Funds from ticket sales will be used to erect a permanent memorial to Pete Cosker and Paul Gerrett. A recording of the 2010 reunion has been released as a live album entitled, To the Urban Man (2010) and a third reunion concert was scheduled for 2011, again in the band's home town of Harrogate.

== Band members ==
- Roy Webber – lead vocals, guitar (1971–1976, 2008–2011)
- Nick Glennie-Smith – keyboards (1974–1976, 2008–2011)
- Pete Sage – electric violin, bass (1971–1976, 2008–2011)
- Will Jackson – lead guitar (2008–2011)
- Frank Mizen – pedal steel, banjo, bass (2008–2011)
- Paul Middleton – steel guitar, bass, vocals (1971–1976, 2008–)
- Roger Narraway – drums, percussion (1971–1976, 2008–2011)
- Phil Dean – electric guitar as concert guest (2008–2011)
- Pete Cosker – lead electric and acoustic guitars, vocals (1971–1976, died in 1990)
- Paul Gerrett – Fender Rhodes electric piano, Hammond organ, Mellotron, harmonium, grand piano, harpsichord, vocals (1971–1974, died in 2008)
- Mike Smith – drums (1972–1973)
- Alan Craig – Bass Guitar and harmony vocals (1971–1972)

== Albums ==
- Wally (1974) Atlantic Records
- Valley Gardens (1975) Atlantic Records
- Montpellier (2010) self-released
- To the Urban Man (2010, Live 2CD) self-released
