= Rudy: The Return of the Racing Pig =

2007 German children's film

- Theatrical release poster
- Directed by: Peter Timm
- Written by: Peter Timm
- Based on: Rennschwein Rudi Rüssel by Uwe Timm
- Produced by: Günter Rohrbach; Heike Wiehle-Timm
- Starring: Sebastian Koch; Sophie von Kessel
- Cinematography: Achim Poulheim
- Edited by: Barbara Hennings
- Music by: Marcel Barsotti
- Production companies: Relevant Film; ARD; WDR
- Distributed by: Warner Bros. Pictures
- Release date: 8 March 2007
- Running time: 97 minutes
- Country: Germany
- Language: German
- Box office: $2.1 million

Rudy: The Return of the Racing Pig (German: Rennschwein Rudi Rüssel 2 - Rudi rennt wieder!) is a 2007 German children's film written and directed by Peter Timm. It is a sequel to the 1995 film Rudy: The Racing Pig.

The film was released in Germany on 8 March 2007 by Warner Bros. Pictures under their Family Entertainment label.

== Cast ==
- Sebastian Koch as Thomas Bussmann
- Sophie von Kessel as Anja Grusig
- Maurice Teichert as Nickel Bussmann
- Sina Richardt as Feli Grusig
- Dominique Horwitz as Bomber
- Andreas Schmidt as Spacko
- Waldemar Kobus as Polizist
- Wolfgang Völz as Fritz
- Volker Michalowski as Trucker
