= The Little Polar Bear =

Franchise

The Little Polar Bear (in Dutch: Lars de kleine ijsbeer) is a franchise about a polar bear cub named Lars who first starred in a number of books written by Dutch author, Hans de Beer.

The first of several animated adaptations of the books is a Japanese original video animation, released on April 28, 1990, with animation production by I.G Tatsunoko (now known as Production I.G).

It later became an animated TV series for BBC TV and WDR Lars, der kleine Eisbär, in the 1990s. The show proved to be popular in Germany. The show was later revived between 2001 and 2003.

== Original BBC TV series adaptation ==
The Little Polar Bear
- Genre: Animation
- Created by: Hans de Beer (novel)
- Written by: Birgit Quastenberg; Josef Schelle; Hans de Beer
- Directed by: Theo Kerp
- Voices of: Susan Sheridan; Jimmy Hibbert; Vanessa Feltz
- Theme music composer: Manfred Schoof
- Composer: Robert Ash for Kick Production Ltd.
- Countries of origin: Germany; Netherlands; United Kingdom
- Original languages: German; English
- No. of episodes: 26

Production
- Executive producer: Siegmund Grewenig
- Producer: Theresa Plummer-Andrews
- Running time: 5-6 minutes
- Production companies: Rothkirch/Kringel Cartoon Film; SWF/SRG; AVRO; Bos Bros. Film-TV Productions; BRTN; Cobo-Fonds

Original release
- Network: BBC One (UK); Das Erste (Germany); AVRO (Netherlands)
- Release: 1992 – 1995

In the mid-1990s, there was a TV adaptation for the BBC, WDR and AVRO, featuring the voice talents of Susan Sheridan and Jimmy Hibbert. The animation of the series was provided by Sinan Gungor.

=== Voices ===
- Susan Sheridan - Lars, Lena, Peeps, Mummy Polar Bear
- Jimmy Hibbert - Daddy Polar Bear, various male voices
- Vanessa Feltz - Brownie Brown Bear

=== Characters ===
- Lars - the little polar bear, main character of the show
- Frieda, Lars' mother
- Mika, Lars' father
- Lena - the Arctic hare
- Peeps - the snow goose
- Brownie - the little brown Bear

=== Episodes ===
No.	Cartoons	Original release date
1	"The Ice Floe"	1994
Lars is carried across the sea on a drifting sheet of ice, until he reaches an island. There he makes friends with Hippo and is given a lift home by Orca.
2	"The Snow Storm"	8 February 1994 (production); 1994 (TV)
While playing in the snow, Lars meets Lena. They both get trapped in a snow storm, but Lars manages to find his way home.
3	"The Egg"	1994
Lars stumbles across a goose egg and warms it, till out hatches a gosling he names Peeps.
4	"The Polar Station"	1994
Lars ventures into the Polar Station. Lena is almost caught by a man, but Lena and Lars make their escape back to the safety of their home.
5	"The Net"	1994
While swimming, Lars is caught in a fish net and loaded onto a fishing freighter. He is met by the ship's cat Nemo, who helps him off the ship.
6	"The Trap"	1994
In a game of hide n' seek, Lena and Peeps get caught in a cage trap. Lars manages to release them and take them to safety from the hunting dogs.
7	"The Mission"	1994
Lars goes to the forest to get some honey medicine for his ill parents. Daddy Brown Bear provides the medicine and Brownie accompanies Lars back home.
8	"The Hunter"	1994
Lars and Brownie are captured by a hunter. Lars releases himself and Brownie, then they release all the other captured animals, before making their way home.
9	"The Ice Cave"	1994
While exploring, Lars, Lena and Peeps plunge deep into an ice grotto. They make a hasty exit as the cave collapses and Orca takes them to safety.
10	"The Labyrinth"	1994
Lena and Peeps are carried off into an ice labyrinth surrounded by thick fog. As Lars finds them, the fog disperses.
11	"The Weather Balloon"	1994
As Lars examines a weather balloon, Peeps gets carried off in it. The seagulls save Peeps, while Lars recovers the seagull's bell clapper.
12	"The Boat"	1994
Lena finds a deserted boat and with Lars and Peeps on board, she sails the sea. After fighting over a life belt, Lars jumps overboard with it and then saves Lena and Peeps from being crushed between two icebergs.
13	"The Barrel"	1994
On a journey to find fish, Lars comes across a wooden barrel full of dried herrings. Lena helps Lars to move it, to provide food for Daddy and Mummy Polar Bear.
14	"The Book"	1994
Lars, Lena and Peeps find a Treasure Chest hidden beneath a thick layer of snow. Inside the chest they see a scrapbook which contains various pictures of themselves. Lars and Lena start fighting over who the treasure belongs to, but eventually manage to share the contains with each other, then bury them once again.
15	"The Honeycomb"	1994
Lars' friend the Brown Bear Brownie shows Lars a towering tree where the two friends try to gather honey from inside the comb, then escape as the angry bees chase them down. Lars and Brownie hide in a cave behind a waterfall.
16	"The Flower"	1994
Lars stumbles across a rare flower and patiently waits for it to grow. Lena and Peeps help Lars protect the flower.
17	"The Teddy Bear"	1994
In the icy land of the North Pole, Lars, Lena and Peeps come across a box, and find a teddy bear. Then they start playing house with it, but Peeps feels left out when trying to join in the fun.
18	"The White Bear"	1994
Brownie introduces Lars to his two younger siblings, but they aren't nice to Lars and tease him to the point where the poor Lars breaks down in tears. Brownie spanks his two brothers, but then Lars, Brownie and his brothers are being chased by a hunter on a snow mobile. They hide in the snow in order to camouflage themselves. One of the two little Brown Bears comments that being a white bear isn't so bad after all.
19	"The Concert"	1994
Lars invites Lena and Peeps to play along with his musical number.
20	"The Competition"	1994
One day when Lars arrives home, he meets a younger Polar Bear, Björn, who starts bullying him. Daddy Polar Bear interrupts their fighting and starts a competition to see who is stronger. Björn swims down a chasm into a shipwreck to recover an anchor, but gets stuck inside a hole in the wreckage. Lars saves Björn from suffocation and the two become friends.
21	"The Camp Fire"	1994
Lars and Brownie catch some fish in the forest. Brownie shows Lars how to make a campfire, but Lars is a little clumsy with it and hurts his paw.
22	"The Polar Night"	1994
Lars tells his friends about an old legend in which a very rare ray of sunlight would shine down upon an old igloo. Lars, Lena and Peeps follow him to the igloo, and after scaring away a large group of noisy birds, the discover the igloo, where the ray of sunlight shines down on them through a hole in the igloo remains.
23	"Playing Tricks"	1994
Lars awakens his friends at midnight to pull various pranks on the seagulls, who are sleeping on top of the floating buoy.
24	"Stomach Ache"	1994
When Lena and Peeps visit Lars to play, they discover him lying in his secret playing den, groaning. After Lars tells them he has stomach ache, Lena and Peeps try to cure and distract him. However, later Lena starts to suspect that Lars is simply pretending to be sick in order to get his friends' attention.
25	"In Love"	1994
While watching a herd of travelling Polar Bears, Lars meets the love of his life, an adorable Polar Bear girl named Oxana. They play together and fall in love with each other. The next day, Lars is shocked to discover that Oxana is part of the very same travelling herd he watched the day prior, and watches her disappear while she sits on the back of one of the elder bears. Oxana promises Lars she will return once the winter season arrives, but the poor Lars is still saddened by their unexpected divorce.
26	"The Sled Dog"	1994
Lars, Lena and Peeps discover a big sled dog race, and help out a small Husky when his sled gets stuck in an ice crack.

== Film ==
For its first film, subtitled Der Kinofilm, Warner Bros. and animation studio Rothkirch Cartoon Film bought the rights to adapt the children's books into a feature-length film, released in 2001.

Following the success of the feature, several direct-to-video features were released, one of the new characters included was a tiger cub. In 2005, another film, The Little Polar Bear 2: The Mysterious Island (German: Der kleine Eisbär 2: Die geheimnisvolle Insel), was released and also proved successful.

The score to The Little Polar Bear was composed by Nigel Clarke and Michael Csányi-Wills and recorded by the Royal Philharmonic Orchestra in London and was nominated for several awards. The Japanese version uses Tomoko Tane's "Rainbow Song" as the ending theme.

== Sequels ==
- The Little Polar Bear: Lars and the Little Tiger (2002)
- The Little Polar Bear: The Dream of Flying (2003)
- The Little Polar Bear: Nanouk's Rescue (2003)
- The Little Polar Bear: A Visitor from the South Pole (2004)
- The Little Polar Bear: The Mysterious Island (2005)
