= The Little Polar Bear (film) =

- German theatrical release poster
- Directed by: Thilo Graf Rothkirch; Piet De Rycker
- Written by: Piet De Rycker; Bert Schrickel; Thomas Wittenburg
- Based on: The Little Polar Bear by Hans de Beer
- Produced by: Thilo Graf Rothkirch; Willi Geike
- Starring: Dirk Bach; Jeanette Biedermann; Jochen Busse; Anke Engelke; Mike Krüger; Ingolf Lück; Vanessa Petruo
- Music by: Nigel Clarke; Michael Csányi-Wills
- Production companies: Rothkirch Cartoon-Film; Warner Bros. Filmproduktion
- Distributed by: Warner Bros. Pictures
- Release date: 4 October 2001
- Running time: 77 minutes
- Country: Germany
- Language: German
- Box office: $14.8 million

The Little Polar Bear (German: Der kleine Eisbär) is a 2001 German animated film directed by Thilo Graf Rothkirch and Piet De Rycker, based on the books of the same name. The film was distributed in Germany by Warner Bros. Pictures through their Family Entertainment label on 4 October 2001.

Warner Bros. also produced an English dub of the film that was released in the United States and United Kingdom in 2003.

== Plot ==
Lars is a little polar bear cub who lived in the North Arctic with his parents. One day, Lars is rescued by a young seal named Robby and they become close friends. They witness three polar bears, Brutus, Bert and Boris about to attack Robby's herd so Lars and Robby save them by falling down an avalanche.

The adult bears chase Lars and Robby and they hide in an old shipwreck. Knowing that Mika's son is friends with a seal, they demand Mika to talk to him and punish him but the walrus, Sophocles refuses and tells him to talk with Lars and let the others get rest.

Lars overhears and refused to listen to his father that polar bears and seals cannot be friends so they resumed on being friends with Robby. Understanding that they cannot be separated. Brutus held up a meeting telling that everything went upside down because of them. Nina argued that they cannot be separated because of their bond. However, their argument was interrupted when the four lemmings commented that the world is glum and one of the lemmings with a red nose started to fall and was rescued by a penguin named Caruso. Sophocles admitted that if he can find a way to cheer the lemmings, they can settle their differences. Lars suggested that the seals can gather fish for the bears so they can be protected. With the new rules settled, Robby and Lars can be together.

Later that night, Lars has gotten separated from his father when a piece of the ice broke, leaving him alone at sea. He was taken to the south where he meets Henry the hippo who takes him home with the help up Marcus, the eagle, and Samson the orca.

Upon returning, Lars and his friends learned that the fish have disappeared and they knew they needed to head to the human village to see if the humans have any. Lars was rescued by an Inuit girl named Lena, who recognized him when she saw him and Robby playing the other day. He also began to learn that a ship, which the humans call the Black Mouth has been eating everyone's fish. After he returned home, Lars was scolded by Mika for going to the human settlement. He tried to explain his father that the Black Mouth was stealing the fish but he refused. To prove his father wrong, he runs away.

Meanwhile, Brutus, Bert and Boris have not eaten any fish and Brutus suggested they should stick with the old rules. However, their plans are interrupted when they see the Black Mouth heading their way and devouring all the seals, including Robby, and the polar bears. Lars, realizing that he needs to save them, has to lure the ship to the rock so it can be damaged. While he leads the ship to the rock, Gretta and Anna are alerted by Peeps, telling that Lars is in trouble. Caruso is also warned by the Lemmings.

They quickly rescued Lars from being devoured by the Black Mouth and successfully destroyed it, freeing the seals, polar bears and fish. Lena realized that her dream came true and visits Lars, thanking him for everything to save the Arctic.

== Voice cast ==
Character	German version	English version
Lars	Mijail Verona	Wesley Singerman
Robby	Maximilian Artajo	Brianne Siddall
Kalle	Jochen Busse	Daran Norris as Brutus
Nalle	Mike Krüger	Neil Kaplan as Bert
Palle	Bernd Stelter	Tom Fahn as Boris
Mika	Ingolf Lück	Michael McConnohie
Greta	Jeanette Biedermann	RuDee Sade
Caruso	Dirk Bach	Joe Ochman
Pieps	Sandro Blümel	Sandy Fox
Lena	Adak Azdasht	Rebecca Forstadt as Anna
Henry	Harry Rowohlt	Steve Blum
Manili	Vanessa Petruo	Kimberly J. Brown as Lena
Sopho / Sophocles	Wolfgang Völz	Ralph Votrian
Großmutter	Barbara Adolph	Edie Mirman as Grandmother
Mutter Eisbär	Anke Engelke	Mari Devon as Nina
Lemmings	Hans Werner Olm; Johann König; Thomas Hackenberger; Roberto Capitoni	Joshua Seth; R. Martin Klein; Edie Mirman; Peter Lurie
Seagulls / Möwe	Santiago Ziesmer; Hans Werner Olm; Frank Schaff	Steve Kramer; Jason Spisak; Robert Axelrod

Additional English voices

- Steve Bulen
- Richard Cansino
- Melora Harte
