= Tobias Totz and his Lion (film) =

- German theatrical release poster
- Directed by: Thilo Graf Rothkirch; Piet De Rycker
- Written by: Thilo Graf Rothkirch; Piet De Rycker; Bert Schrickel
- Starring: Jürgen von der Lippe; Nena; Ingolf Lück; Mirco Nontschew; Hape Kerkeling
- Music by: Nikolaus Glowna; Siggi Mueller
- Production companies: Rothkirch/Cartoon Film; Munich Animation; Bioskop Film; Stupid Studio; Warner Bros. Film Gmbh
- Distributed by: Warner Bros.
- Release dates: 30 September 1999 (Germany); 21 February 2000 (Belgium)
- Running time: 77 minutes
- Countries: Germany; Belgium
- Languages: German; Flemish

Tobias Totz and his Lion (German: Tobias Totz und sein Löwe), (Dutch: Tobias Totz en Leeuw) is a 1999 animated film directed by Thilo Graf Rothkirch and Piet De Rycker. It was released on 30 September 1999 by Warner Bros. under their Family Entertainment label.

== Voice cast ==
=== German voice cast ===
- Jürgen von der Lippe as Tobias Totz
- Nena as Lea
- Ingolf Lück as Gino
- Mirco Nontschew as Luigi
- Hape Kerkeling as Paul Pommes

=== Flemish voice cast ===
- Hubert Damen
- Marc de Bel
- Matthias Schoenaerts
- Isabelle Averens

== Home media ==
The film was released on DVD by Warner Home Video in September 2000.
