= The Fearless Four (film) =

- Theatrical release poster
- Directed by: Michael Coldewey; Eberhard Junkersdorf; Jürgen Richter; Wolfgang Urchs
- Written by: Bert Henry; Dagmar Kekulé; Georg Reichel; Markus Urchs
- Based on: Town Musicians of Bremen by Brothers Grimm
- Produced by: Eberhard Junkersdorf
- Starring: Bernd Schramm; Sandra Schwarzhaupt; Mario Adorf; Joachim Kemmer; Peer Augustinski
- Narrated by: Klausjürgen Wussow
- Edited by: Uli Schön
- Music by: Péter Wolf
- Production companies: Munich Animation; Bioskop Film
- Distributed by: Warner Bros.
- Release date: 2 October 1997
- Running time: 87 minutes
- Country: Germany
- Language: German
- Budget: $13-15 million

The Fearless Four (German: Die furchtlosen Vier) is a 1997 German animated musical film loosely based on the folk tale of the "Town Musicians of Bremen" by the Brothers Grimm, about four funny animals that all have one thing in common: they want to sing, but can't for assorted reasons. Combining traditional animation with computer animation, the film was produced by Munich Animation and released by the German unit of Warner Bros. under the Warner Bros. Family Entertainment label. Producer Eberhard Junkersdorf won a Bavarian Film Award in 1998 for "Best Production".

== Plot ==
A bloodhound Buster prefers to sing and dance instead of hunting foxes. When his owners plan to sell him to Mix Max, a food factory, Buster escapes. On his journey, he encounters an old donkey named Fred whose job is replaced by a machine, a Siamese cat named Gwendolyn who fled from her late owner's jealous heirs, and a rooster named Tortellini who was kicked out by his wife for an affair with a duck.

On their journey, they discuss their collective aspirations for stardom and ending up heading to Bremen, not Paris as they originally thought. An owl warns them that Bremen is controlled by evil scientist Dr. Greed, President of Mix Max, who has banned music. However, after hearing them sing, his assistants, Platini and Ackerman, convince Greed to use their talent to improve the factory's image by singing a jingle advertising his sausages. Despite their newfound fame, the animals tire of singing the same jingle over and over, and attempt a change in their career, but their idea gets rejected. The animals later learn Mix Max owns their voices and their freedom.

After an attempt to fight back, the animals are imprisoned. A mouse named Mozart tries to help them escape, but fails to due to his small size. They eventually escape by Tortellini pulling Buster's tail and leads to him breaking the bars in anger. While escaping the factory, the animals see Mix Max's scheme of caging animals to make their way to be slaughtered to make their sausages and promise to save them. The four animals protest at Dr. Greed's reelection campaign, inspiring the people to riot. After Dr. Greed, Platini, and Ackerman escape, the animals trick and scare them by looking like an eight-eyed monster, and trapping them under a movable tiled floor. The caged animals are freed and the Mix Max factory is destroyed. Tortellini, Fred, and Buster move into Gwendolyn's new estate, with the latter two admitting their feelings for each other.

== Cast ==
Character	(Germany) Original German	(United States) (Canada) English dub
Buster the dog	Bernd Schramm (speaking voice); Hartmut Engler (singing voice)	James Ingram
Gwendolyn the cat	Sandra Schwarzhaupt	Oleta Adams
Fred the donkey	Mario Adorf	B.B. King
Tortellini the rooster	Joachim Kemmer	Zucchero
Dr. Trevor Greed	Peer Augustinski	Ian James Corlett
Platini	Hans-Werner Bussinger	Garry Chalk
The Baron	Klaus Sonnenschein	Garry Chalk
Mozart	Ranja Helmy	Kathleen Barr
Taxidermy Representative	Lutz Riedel	Robert O. Smith
The Miller	Tom Deininger	Garry Chalk
The Host	unknown	Michael Donovan
1st Assistant	unknown	Ian James Corlett
2nd Assistant	unknown	Scott McNeil
The Heiress	Katharina Thalbach	Louise Vallance
The Heir	Georg Tryphon	Michael Donovan
Guards	unknown	Scott McNeil; Garry Chalk; Michael Donovan
Hunters	Horst Lampe; Till Hagen	Scott McNeil; Ian James Corlett
Big Mother Berta	unknown	Kathleen Barr
Ackerman	Michael Walke	Richard Newman
Dr. Sevenbrains	Ulrich Voß	Robert O. Smith
Wasps	unknown	Louise Vallance; Kathleen Barr
Samantha	Dagmar Altrichter	Kathleen Barr
The Manager	Tobias Meister	Scott McNeil
The Recording Director	Stefan Krause	Scott McNeil
Mr. Slithers, Dr. Trevor Greed's Snake	Uwe Paulsen	Rick Jones
Powertool	Frank Zander	Kevin Dorsey
The Narrator	Klausjürgen Wussow	Christopher Graze

== Production ==
Production began in March 1995 (when Munich Animation was founded) and ended in December 1996. 150 people globally worked on the film, which included animators from the computer animation field working on the backgrounds, the robot centaur (Powertool) and the vehicles. The 2D animation was colored digitally. The film was produced and recorded for an English audience, and was later dubbed into German for its original release.

== Release ==
In North America, the English version was released on Warner Home Video on May 7, 1998, but the VHS went quickly out of print and remains extremely rare. Germany received a DVD release twice; a regular release, and one from Warner Kids (a label for family-friendly Warner Bros. films) using the original title, Die Bremer Stadtmusikanten; neither DVD has any English audio and subtitle options. A much easier-to-find PAL VHS was released in the United Kingdom on July 19, 1999. Despite being virtually unknown in the United States and in most of the world, the English dub is currently available on sources such as Vudu, iTunes, Amazon Prime Video and the Microsoft Store. In 2018, South Korea released a DVD with an English dub in it. It is unknown if Warner Bros. will bring out a Region 1 DVD release in the United States.

The original German-language version (with NTSC format) was uploaded by its YouTube channel, Movies [SnoopyPBG 2nd Channel], on November 15, 2021.

=== Deleted scenes ===
Various scenes were deleted from the original version, or shortened, when distributed outside Germany (making the international cut 81 minutes), as follows:

- Scenes in which Dr. Greed attempts to hire an assassin to kill the owner of a rival company are removed entirely.
- The scene in which Fred is tortured by the "tickle torture" machine was greatly shortened in some versions outside Germany, and completely removed in others.
- A scene where Gwendolyn openly seduces Platini with a song was cut from international releases, most likely due to the suggestion of bestiality.
- A brief shot in which a bee lands on a magazine photo of a woman's breast was eliminated.
- The German version's ending shows the animals, including Mozart the mouse, drinking wine to celebrate their victory and their future as travelling musicians. This was removed in some international releases.

=== Merchandise ===
Stuffed animals, a soundtrack, Bullyland figures, books and other items were produced for the film's release in Germany.

=== Broadcast ===
The film was broadcast on HBO in 1999, and on Encore in North America. It was also seen on channels such as AB3 (France), Cartoon Network (United Kingdom), Teletoon (Canada), YTV and Treehouse TV.
