= María Fernanda Morales =

Mexican voice actress

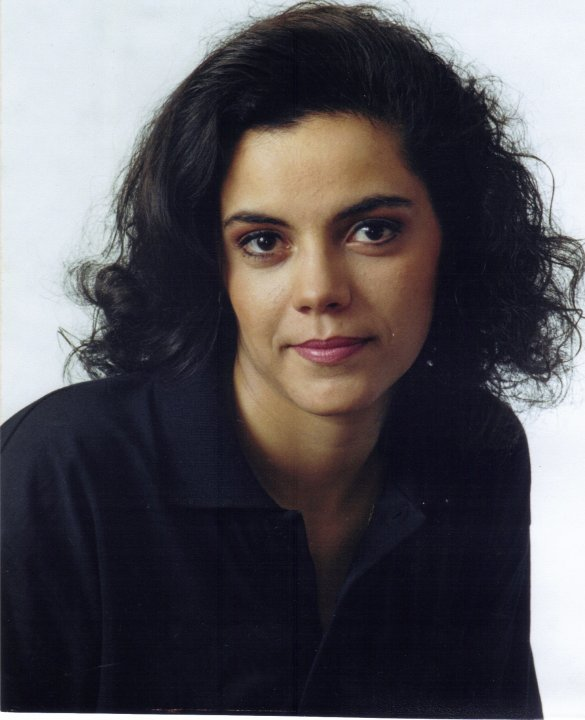
- Born: María Fernanda del Carmen Morales Ponce de León; November 7, 1970 (age 56); Mexico City, Mexico
- Occupation: Voice actress

María Fernanda del Carmen Morales Ponce de León (born November 7, 1970, in Mexico City) is a Mexican voice actress. Morales is most known for the voice of Saori Kido in Saint Seiya, Chip in Chip 'n Dale Rescue Rangers, Kimi Finster in Rugrats and All Grown Up!, and Sailor Venus in Sailor Moon among other works she has worked on.

== Roles ==
=== Television animation ===
- All Grown Up! (Kimi Finster (Dionne Quan)
- Bob the Builder (Wendy (Kate Harbour)
- Captain N: The Game Master (Princess Lana (Venus Terzo)
- Chip 'n Dale Rescue Rangers (Chip (Tress MacNeille)
- Corrector Yui (Yui Kasuga (Makiko Ōmoto)
- Talespin (Molly Cunningham (Janna Michaels), Princess Lotta L'Amour (Kath Soucie))
- Daria (Quinn Morgendorffer) (Wendy Hoopes)
- DuckTales (Hugo, Paco and Luis (Russi Taylor)
- Ed, Edd y Eddy (Johnny (second voice) (David Paul Grove)
- Rugrats (Kimi Finster (Dionne Quan)
- Pokémon (Flannery) (Rio Natsuki)
- Sailor Moon (Sailor Venus (Rika Fukami)
- Sailor Moon Crystal (Sailor Venus (Shizuka Itō)
- Saint Seiya (Athena (Saint Seiya) (Keiko Han, Fumiko Orikasa)
- Zatch Bell! (Kido, Li-en)
- Invader Zim (Tak)

=== OVA ===
- Baby Einstein (Narrator for videos)
- FernGully: The Last Rainforest (Crysta (Samantha Mathis))
- FernGully 2: The Magical Rescue (Crysta (Laura Elrich))
- The Lion King 1½ (Adult Nala (Moira Kelly))
- The Lion King II: Simba's Pride (Nala (Moira Kelly))
- Once Upon a Forest (Abigail) (Ellen Blain)
- The Iron Giant (Annie Hughes) (Jennifer Aniston)
- Mickey's Magical Christmas: Snowed in at the House of Mouse (Chip and Hugo, Paco and Luis (Tress MacNeille and Tony Anselmo))

=== Theatrical animation ===
- Kiki's Delivery Service (Ursula (Minami Takayama))
- Rock-a-Doodle (Peepers (Sandy Duncan))
- The Lion King (Adult Nala (Moira Kelly))
- A Goofy Movie (Stacey (Jenna von Oy))
- Los Caballeros del Zodíaco: La Película (Athena)
- Space Jam (Lola Bunny (Kath Soucie))
- Final Fantasy: The Spirits Within (Aki Ross (Ming-Na))
- The Road to El Dorado (Chel (Rosie Perez))

=== Live action ===
- Spider-Man 2 (Ursula Ditkovich (Mageina Tovah))
- Spider-Man 3 (Ursula Ditkovitch (Mageina Tovah))
