= Warner Bros. Family Entertainment =

Label of Warner Bros. Entertainment

- Type: Label
- Industry: Film
- Founded: 1993; 33 years ago
- Defunct: 2011; 15 years ago
- Fate: Label retired
- Successors: Studio: Warner Bros. Pictures; Warner Bros. Pictures Animation; Warner Bros. Animation; Library: Warner Bros.
- Headquarters: 411 North Hollywood Way, Burbank, California, U.S.
- Area served: Worldwide
- Products: Motion pictures
- Parent: Warner Bros.

Warner Bros. Family Entertainment was the family label of Warner Bros. Entertainment Inc. It was founded in 1993 and released numerous theatrical and direct-to-video family-oriented films and television shows before the label was retired in 2011.

== History ==
The division was founded under Time Warner Entertainment in 1993 to produce more family-friendly films after its 1987 distribution deal with the Walt Disney Company in which Warner Bros. International released Disney films theatrically (e.g. The Little Mermaid, Beauty and the Beast as well as reissues such as Cinderella) in many overseas territories from 1988 to 1992. The first theatrical film released under the Family Entertainment label was Dennis the Menace, released in the summer of 1993. The film proved to be a huge hit at the box office, grossing over $50 million at the domestic box office despite receiving negative reviews from critics. Following it was Free Willy, which was also released in the summer of 1993 and would also be a huge box office hit, grossing over $75 million domestically.

Other 1993 releases included a live-action film adaptation of the book The Secret Garden, which didn't perform as well as the previous two films but still garnered over $30 million at the domestic box office, and George Balanchine's The Nutcracker. The last 1993 theatrical release from Warner Bros. Family Entertainment was Batman: Mask of the Phantasm, and it wasn't a success at the box office, getting only $5 million at the box office compared to its $6 million budget, due to a lack of promotion from Warner Bros.

In 1994, it was the worst year for Warner Bros. Family Entertainment, where it was home to numerous box-office bombs. In the early part of 1994, Warner Bros. released Thumbelina, which was a major box-office bomb. Another 1994 film was a live-action rendition of the book Black Beauty, which was another box-office bomb for the studio, grabbing only nearly $5 million at the box office. Following it was A Troll in Central Park, which garnered less than $1 million at the box office. The last two films in 1994 were Little Giants, which performed better, but only received nearly $20 million domestically and Richie Rich, which was a box-office success, grossing over $76 million for its $40 million budget.

In 1995, it brought a live-action rendition of the book A Little Princess, which only got over $10 million in its domestic release. Other films that year included international distribution of The Pebble and the Penguin, which was a box-office bomb, grossing nearly $4 million, and Born to Be Wild, which also garnered nearly $4 million. However, the biggest success of 1995 for the company was the sequel to Free Willy, Free Willy 2: The Adventure Home, which, although not nearly as successful as the first film, was a minor success, garnering over $30 million.

In 1996, it saw Warner Bros. Family Entertainment's biggest hit yet, Space Jam, which garnered over $90 million domestically. The following year, the division released Turner Feature Animation's Cats Don't Dance (inherited from Turner Pictures as a result of Time Warner's merger with Turner Broadcasting), which bombed at the box office with over $3 million earned stemming from a lack of promotion. The next 1997 film was the third Free Willy film, Free Willy 3: The Rescue, which performed poorly, grossing over $3 million.

In 1998, it released Warner Bros. Feature Animation's Quest for Camelot, which would be a box-office bomb, but grossed more than previous films released by the company, grossing nearly $23 million domestically. In 1999, Warner Bros. Family Entertainment released two more films, the poorly performed The King and I, which only grossed nearly $12 million, and Brad Bird's The Iron Giant, which was also a box-office bomb, grossing over $23 million. The film itself was planned to be released under the banner, but director Brad Bird was against it for a multitude of reasons, especially the serious tone, Bugs Bunny being an ill-fit to open the film, and that the words "Family Entertainment" would have made this be marketed solely as a kids film, so Bird and the crew made a custom Warner Bros. Feature Animation logo instead. The Iron Giant would, however, go on to become a cult classic through video releases and television airings. The only film released under Warner Bros. Family Entertainment in 2000 was My Dog Skip, which became the company's first major box-office success in nearly four years, grossing nearly $35 million, although the film itself would use the main Warner Bros. Pictures logo instead.

Warner Bros. continued to release family films later in the 2000s as well as the 2010s, but the logo for its Family Entertainment subsidiary was no longer used in the United States.

Warner Bros. Family Entertainment continued operations in Germany until 2011, after releasing Laura's Star and the Dream Monsters.

Though made before Warner Bros. created the label, it also covers the VHS releases of Calamity Jane, The Incredible Mr. Limpet, The Wizard of Oz, Willy Wonka and the Chocolate Factory, Superman, Bugs Bunny's 3rd Movie: 1001 Rabbit Tales, The NeverEnding Story, The Goonies, Daffy Duck's Quackbusters, All Dogs Go to Heaven (the 1996 UK VHS release only), The NeverEnding Story, The NeverEnding Story II: The Next Chapter, Rover Dangerfield, Curly Sue, and Lois & Clark: The New Adventures of Superman.

== Notable theatrical movies ==
- Dennis the Menace (1993, co-production with Hughes Entertainment)
- Free Willy (1993, co-production with Regency Enterprises)
- The Secret Garden (1993)
- George Balanchine's The Nutcracker (1993, co-production with Elektra Entertainment and Regency Enterprises) (Note: Owned by Disney (via 20th Century Studios))
- Batman: Mask of the Phantasm (1993, co-production with DC Entertainment)
- Thumbelina (1994, produced by Don Bluth Entertainment)
- Black Beauty (1994)
- A Troll in Central Park (1994, produced by Don Bluth Entertainment)
- Little Giants (1994, co-production with Amblin Entertainment)
- The NeverEnding Story III (1994, German, French and U.K. distribution only)
- Richie Rich (1994, co-production with Silver Pictures, Davis Entertainment and The Harvey Entertainment Company)
- Born to Be Wild (1995)
- A Little Princess (1995)
- Free Willy 2: The Adventure Home (1995, co-production with Regency Enterprises)
- The Amazing Panda Adventure (1995)
- The Pebble and the Penguin (1995, non-US distribution only, produced by Don Bluth Entertainment)
- It Takes Two (1995, North American distribution only, produced by Rysher Entertainment) (Note: Owned by Vine Alternative Investments, with distribution rights currently handled by Paramount Pictures)
- Space Jam (1996, co-production with Warner Bros. Feature Animation)
- The Adventures of Pinocchio (1996, German theatrical distribution only)
- Shiloh (1996, co-distribution with Legacy Releasing)
- Cats Don't Dance (1997, co-production with Turner Entertainment Co.)
- A Rat's Tale (1997, co-production with Augsburger Puppenkiste and Monty Film)
- Mijn Franse tante Gazeuse (1997, Dutch distribution only, produced by Bos Bros. Film-TV Productions and AVRO) (Note: Owned by In The Air)
- The Fearless Four (1997, co-production with Munich Animation, Stardust Pictures London, and Bioskop Film)
- Air Bud (1997, UK distribution only)
- Free Willy 3: The Rescue (1997, co-production with Regency Enterprises)
- Quest for Camelot (1998, co-production with Warner Bros. Feature Animation)
- The Flying Liftboy (1998, Dutch distribution only, produced by Bos Bros. Film-TV Productions, Delux Productions and AVRO)
- The King and I (1999, distribution only, produced by Morgan Creek Entertainment) (Note: Owned by Morgan Creek Entertainment, with international rights licensed to Revolution Studios; home media, television and streaming rights are sub-licensed to Sony Pictures, with select distribution rights also sub-licensed to Relativity Media)
- Shiloh 2: Shiloh Season (1999, co-distribution with Legacy Releasing)
- The Iron Giant (1999, co-production with Warner Bros. Feature Animation)
- Tobias Totz and his Lion (1999)
- Pokémon: The First Movie (1999, co-distribution with Kids' WB only, produced by 4Kids Entertainment)
- My Dog Skip (2000, co-production with Alcon Entertainment)
- Pokémon the Movie 2000 (2000, co-distribution with Kids' WB only, produced by 4Kids Entertainment)
- The Little Vampire (2000, German distribution only, produced by Cometstone Pictures)
- Serafín: La película (2001, Mexican distribution only)
- Pokémon 3: The Movie (2001, co-distribution with Kids' WB only, produced by 4Kids Entertainment)
- The Little Polar Bear (2001)
- Miss Minoes (2001, Dutch and German distribution only, produced by Bos Bros. Film-TV Productions and AVRO)
- Little Longnose (2003, German distribution only, produced by Melnitsa Animation Studio)
- 4 Freunde und 4 Pfoten (2003)
- Laura's Star (2004)
- The Little Polar Bear 2: The Mysterious Island (2005)
- The Thief Lord (2006, non-US distribution only)
- The Trip to Panama (2006)
- The Ugly Duckling and Me! (2006, German distribution only)
- Rudy: The Return of the Racing Pig (2007)
- Two Times Lotte (2007)
- Little Dodo (2008)
- Laura's Star and the Mysterious Dragon Nian (2009)
- Laura's Star and the Dream Monsters (2011)

== Notable direct-to-video movies ==
Release date	Title	Notes
1990s
March 11, 1992	Tiny Toon Adventures: How I Spent My Vacation	with Amblin Entertainment
November 21, 1995	The Snow Queen	with Martin Gates Productions
1996	The Snow Queen's Revenge	with Martin Gates Productions
March 17, 1998	Batman & Mr. Freeze: SubZero	with DC Comics
June 16, 1998	The Mighty Kong	
July 14, 1998	Dennis the Menace Strikes Again	with Outlaw Productions
September 22, 1998	Scooby-Doo on Zombie Island	with Hanna-Barbera
November 3, 1998	Richie Rich's Christmas Wish	with Saban Entertainment and The Harvey Entertainment Company
October 5, 1999	Scooby-Doo! and the Witch's Ghost	with Hanna-Barbera
December 21, 1999	Wakko's Wish	with Amblin Entertainment
2000s
August 26, 2000	The Scarecrow	with Rich Animation Studios
September 12, 2000	Tweety's High-Flying Adventure	
October 3, 2000	Scooby-Doo and the Alien Invaders	with Hanna-Barbera
December 12, 2000	Batman Beyond: Return of the Joker	with DC Comics
October 9, 2001	Scooby-Doo and the Cyber Chase	with Hanna-Barbera
March 12, 2002	Tom and Jerry: The Magic Ring	with Turner Entertainment Co.
September 3, 2002	Oliver Twist	re-release
February 11, 2003	Baby Looney Tunes' Eggs-traordinary Adventure	
March 4, 2003	Scooby-Doo! and the Legend of the Vampire	
September 30, 2003	Scooby-Doo! and the Monster of Mexico	
October 21, 2003	Batman: Mystery of the Batwoman	with DC Comics
June 22, 2004	Scooby-Doo! and the Loch Ness Monster	
October 5, 2004	¡Mucha Lucha!: The Return of El Maléfico	with Fwak! Animation
November 16, 2004	Kangaroo Jack: G'Day U.S.A.!	with Castle Rock Entertainment
January 18, 2005	Tom and Jerry: Blast Off to Mars	with Turner Entertainment Co.
February 8, 2005	Aloha, Scooby-Doo!	
October 11, 2005	Tom and Jerry: The Fast and the Furry	with Turner Entertainment Co.; released theatrically in select cities by Kidtoon Films
October 18, 2005	The Batman vs. Dracula	with DC Comics; television film
December 13, 2005	Scooby-Doo! in Where's My Mummy?	released theatrically in select cities by Kidtoon Films
June 20, 2006	Superman: Brainiac Attacks	with DC Comics
August 22, 2006	Tom and Jerry: Shiver Me Whiskers	with Turner Entertainment Co.
September 15, 2006	Teen Titans: Trouble in Tokyo	with DC Comics; television film
September 19, 2006	Scooby-Doo! Pirates Ahoy!	
November 14, 2006	Bah, Humduck! A Looney Tunes Christmas	
September 4, 2007	Chill Out, Scooby-Doo!	
October 2, 2007	Tom and Jerry: A Nutcracker Tale	with Turner Entertainment Co.

== Notable television shows ==
- Tiny Toon Adventures (1990–1995 (including specials), with Amblin Entertainment)
- Merrie Melodies Starring Bugs Bunny & Friends (1990–1994)
- Taz-Mania (1991–1995)
- Batman: The Animated Series (1992–1995, with DC Comics)
- Animaniacs (1993–1998, with Amblin Entertainment)
- Free Willy (1994, with Nelvana and Regency)
- Freakazoid! (1995–1997, with Amblin Entertainment)
- Pinky and the Brain (1995–1998, with Amblin Entertainment)
- The Sylvester & Tweety Mysteries (1995–2002)
- That's Warner Bros.! (1995–1996)
- Road Rovers (1996–1997)
- Superman: The Animated Series (1996–2000, with DC Comics)
- Waynehead (1996–1997, with Nelvana)
- Bugs 'n' Daffy (1996–1998)
- The Daffy Duck Show (1996–1997)
- The Legend of Calamity Jane (1997–1998)
- The New Batman/Superman Adventures (1997–2000, with DC Comics)
- The New Batman Adventures (1997–1999, with DC Comics)
- Histeria! (1998–2000)
- Pinky, Elmyra & the Brain (1998–1999, with Amblin Entertainment)
- Batman Beyond (1999–2001, with DC Comics)
- The Big Cartoonie Show (1999–2000)
- Detention (1999–2000)
- Static Shock (2000–2004, with DC Comics)
- Justice League (2001–2004, with DC Comics)
- The Zeta Project (2001–2002, with DC Comics)
- Baby Looney Tunes (2002–2005)
- ¡Mucha Lucha! (2002–2005)
- Ozzy & Drix (2002–2004)
- What's New, Scooby-Doo? (2002–2006)
- Duck Dodgers (2003–2005)
- Teen Titans (2003–2006, with DC Comics)
- Xiaolin Showdown (2003–2006)
- The Batman (2004–2008, with DC Comics)
- Justice League Unlimited (2004–2006, with DC Comics)
- Coconut Fred's Fruit Salad Island! (2005–2006)
- Johnny Test (2005–2014; first season only) (Note: Owned by WildBrain)
- Firehouse Tales (2005–2006)
- Krypto the Superdog (2005–2006, with DC Comics)
- Loonatics Unleashed (2005–2007)
- Legion of Super Heroes (2006–2008, with DC Comics)
- Shaggy & Scooby-Doo Get a Clue! (2006–2008)
- Tom and Jerry Tales (2006–2008, with Turner Entertainment Co.)
