= Munich Animation =

- Industry: Animation
- Genre: Traditional and CGI Animation
- Founded: March 1995
- Headquarters: Munich, Germany

Munich Animation is a German animation studio based in Munich, Germany. It produces traditional and CGI animation for feature films, short films, television, advertising and games. The studio's notable features include The Fearless Four and Help! I'm a Fish.

== Filmography ==
Note: This section only lists films entirely produced by the company.

- The Day of the Cat (2010)
- Wo ist Fred? (2006)

=== Traditionally animated films ===
- Jester Till (2003)
- The Shark and the Piano (2001) – Short
- Help! I'm a Fish (2000)
- Tobias and His Lion (1999)
- The Fearless Four (1997)
