= Two Times Lotte (2007 film) =

2007 German film by Toby Genkel

- German theatrical release poster
- Directed by: Toby Genkel
- Screenplay by: Rolf Dieckmann
- Based on: Lisa and Lottie by Erich Kästner
- Produced by: Peter Zenk; Stephan D. Hansch; Thomas Walker
- Starring: Céline Vogt; Carin C Tietze; Anja Kling
- Music by: J.P. Genkel
- Production companies: Trickompany Filmproduktion; Warner Bros. Film Productions Germany; Lunaris Film- und Fernsehproduktion
- Distributed by: Warner Bros. Pictures
- Release date: 10 May 2007
- Running time: 80 minutes
- Country: Germany
- Language: German
- Box office: $2 million

Two Times Lotte (German: Das doppelte Lottchen) is a 2007 German animated film directed by Toby Genkel. It is an adaptation of 1949 children's novel Lisa and Lottie by Erich Kästner.

The film was released in Germany on 10 May 2007 by Warner Bros. Pictures under their Family Entertainment label, where it grossed over $2 million at the box office. It received positive reviews.

== Plot ==
When Louise and Lotte meet they quickly realize that they are twins separated after birth. They switch identities, meet their unknown parent, respectively, and try to find out about the divorce. Bad news: Dad plans to marry another woman.

== Voice cast ==
- Céline Vogt as Luise/Lotte
- Carin C Tietze as Mother
- Andreas Fröhlich as Father
- Anja Kling as Irene Gerlach
- Wolfgang Völz as Dr. Strobele
- Jovita Dermota as Resi
- Axel Milberg as Narrator
