= Miguel Galván =

Mexican comedian and actor

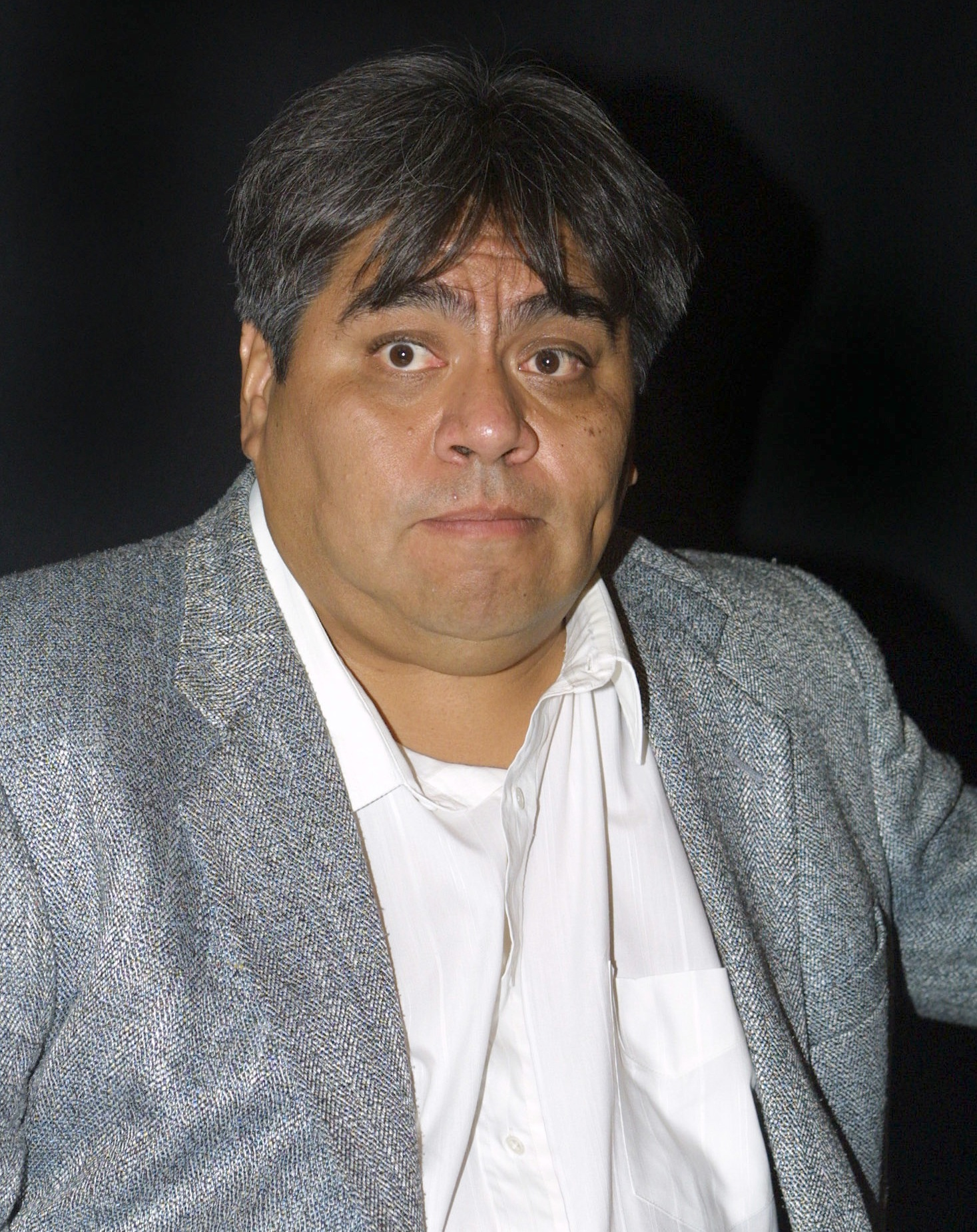
Miguel Galván

Miguel Eduardo Galván Meza (October 13, 1957 – April 14, 2008) was a Mexican comedian and actor, known for his appearances on TV shows like La Parodia and La Hora Pico. He died due to a respiratory arrest in a hospital.

== Biography ==
He was born in Juan Aldama, Zacatecas, and studied to be an architect before taking three years of theatre classes. He rose to fame in a TV commercial for the defunct bank Bital (now HSBC México) where he played a filthy but comic prison inmate. His nickname La Tartamuda (The Stutterer, a comparison with the onomatopoeia of a gun firing bullets) originated from this part.

He acted in films including Perdita Durango (1997), Sexo, pudor y lágrimas (1999) and Mejor que la vida (2008), although he was most famous for his TV work. He starred in La Hora Pico (Rush Hour), first aired in 2000. In the show, he took the role of many characters such as La Madre Sota (Spanish word-play, "the big mother"), El Pollero. In La Parodia he played characters like Shrek, Carmelita Salinas (after Carmen Salinas), Laura (after Laura Bozzo), and others, starring along with Arath de la Torre, Angélica Vale and "Los Masca Brothers", Freddy and Germán Ortega.

He also starred in several Mexican soap operas. In 2003, he co-starred with Andrea Legarreta and Eduardo Capetillo in the children's soap opera ¡Vivan los niños!, and in 2007 on Destilando Amor which marked his last TV appearance.

== Death ==
He suffered from diabetes and hypertension. He was hospitalized when he fainted after a theatrical performance. He had three hemodialysis sessions, but his health continued to deteriorate and he died on Monday, April 14, 2008. He was cremated, and, following his wishes, half of his ashes went to a church in Lindavista, the other half were scattered in the sea off Acapulco.
