= Lauras Stern =

Children's book series by Klaus Baumgart

- Countries of origin: Germany; South Korea
- Original languages: German; Korean
- No. of episodes: 52

Original release
- Network: KBS1
- Release: 22 November 2002 – 2011
- Network: ZDF
- Release: 21 November 2003 – 2012

Lauras Stern (Laura's Star) is a German children's book series by Klaus Baumgart. It was first published in October 1996. The story is about the five year old Laura who finds an injured star. After patching it up, they go on several adventures together. The popular series was animated into a children's television series, that ran from November 22, 2002 until 2011. In 2004 a motion-picture film of the same name was released. Two sequels were released in 2009 and 2011.

== See also ==
- List of German television series
