= No-Eared Bunny and Two-Eared Chick =

2013 German animated film

No-Eared and Two-Eared Chick
- Theatrical release poster
- Directed by: Maya Gräfin Rothkirch; Til Schweiger
- Screenplay by: Thilo Graf Rothkirch; Klaus Baumgart; Til Schweiger
- Produced by: Maya Gräfin Rothkirch; Thilo Graf Rothkirch; Tom Zickler; Til Schweiger
- Cinematography: Ralph Niemeyer
- Edited by: Erik Stappenbeck
- Music by: Dirk Reichardt
- Production companies: Rothkirch/Cartoon-Film; Co-production: Warner Bros Entertainment Germany; Barefoot Films
- Distributed by: Warner Bros. Pictures
- Release date: 26 September 2013
- Running time: 75 minutes
- Country: Germany
- Language: German
- Box office: $2.8 million

No-Eared Bunny and Two-Eared Chick (German: Keinohrhase und Zweiohrküken) is a 2013 German animated children's film directed by Maya Gräfin Rothkirch and Til Schweiger (who also acted as producers), based on a screenplay by Thilo Graf Rothkirch, Klaus Baumgart and Schweiger. Produced by Rothkirch Cartoon-Film in co-production with Warner Bros Entertainment Germany and Barefoot Films, the soundtrack was composed by Dirk Reichardt. No-Eared Bunny and Two-Eared Chick was released in German cinemas on 26 September 2013 by Warner Bros. Pictures, and had a worldwide box office gross of $2,875,527. It received mixed to negative reviews from critics.

== Premise ==
A bunny born without ears is ostracised by the other bunnies in his town. One day, he finds an egg lying on his doormat. When the Two-Eared Chick finally hatches from the egg, a close friendship flourishes between the two. However, an evil fox threatens their livelihood.

== Release ==
No-Eared Bunny and Two-Eared Chick was released in German cinemas on 26 September 2013 by Warner Bros. Pictures, where it had an opening gross of $394,998 from 576 theatres. By 30 September, the film had received 42,000 admissions from 589 theatres. No-Eared and Two-Eared Chick ended its German theatrical run with a total gross of $2,416,348. In Belgium and Austria, released on 25 September and 27 September respectively, No-Eared Bunny and Two-Eared Chick grossed an additional $459,179, giving the film a final box office gross of $2,875,527.
