= Laura's Star and the Dream Monsters =

2011 German 3D animated film

- German theatrical release poster
- Directed by: Thilo Graf Rothkirch; Ute von Münchow-Pohl
- Written by: Rolf Giesen; Sabine Mädel; Thilo Rothkirch; Ute von Münchow-Pohl
- Based on: Lauras Stern by Klaus Baumgart
- Produced by: Thilo Graf Rothkirch; Maya Gräfin Rothkirch
- Starring: Annabel Wolf; Sandro Iannotta
- Cinematography: Ralph Niemeyer
- Edited by: Erik Stappenbeck
- Music by: Henning Lohner
- Production companies: Rothkirch/Cartoon-Film; Warner Bros. Film Productions Germany; MABO Pictures Filmproduktion; Comet Film
- Distributed by: Warner Bros. Pictures (Note: Although the Warner Bros. Family Entertainment branding and logo appear on all promotional material, the logo doesn't appear in the film itself.)
- Release date: 13 October 2011
- Running time: 62 minutes
- Country: Germany
- Language: German
- Box office: $3 million

Laura's Star and the Dream Monsters (German: Lauras Stern und die Traummonster) is a 2011 German 3D animated film directed by Thilo Graf Rothkirch and Ute von Münchow-Pohl. It's the third sequel to Laura's Star, based on the book by Klaus Baumgart. It was preceded by Laura's Star and the Mysterious Dragon Nian.

The film was released in Germany on 13 October 2011 by Warner Bros. Pictures and it was their final film to be released under their Family Entertainment label. The film received positive reviews and grossed over $3 million at the box office.

== Voice cast ==
- Annabel Wolf as Laura
- Sandro Iannotta as Tommy
- Emma Grimm as Sophie
- Luca Kämmer as Ben
- Désirée Nick as Tentakel
- Martin Schneider as Beule
- Markus Maria Profitlich as Fresso
- Bernhard Hoëcker as Stielauge
- Oliver Kalkofe as Chefmonster
- Brit Gülland as Mama
- Heinrich Schafmeister as Papa

== Release ==
The film was released on DVD and Blu-ray by Warner Home Video on 30 March 2012.
