= Laura's Star and the Mysterious Dragon Nian =

2009 German animated film

- German theatrical release poster
- Directed by: Thilo Graf Rothkirch; Piet De Rycker
- Written by: Thilo Graf Rothkirch; Piet De Rycker; Rolf Giesen
- Based on: Lauras Stern by Klaus Baumgart
- Produced by: Thilo Graf Rothkirch; Maya Gräfin Rothkirch
- Starring: Annabel Wolf; Sandro Iannotta; Mariann Schneider; Dirk Bach
- Edited by: Erik Stappenbeck
- Music by: Guy Cuyvers; Henning Lohner
- Production companies: Rothkirch Cartoon-Film; MABO Pictures Filmproduktion; 3D Animagics Entertainment; Warner Bros. Film Productions Germany
- Distributed by: Warner Bros. Pictures (Germany); Shanghai Media Group (China)
- Release date: 24 September 2009 (Germany)
- Running time: 76 minutes
- Countries: Germany; China
- Language: German
- Box office: $4.2 million

Laura's Star and the Mysterious Dragon Nian (German: Lauras Stern und der geheimnisvolle Drache Nian) is a 2009 German animated film directed by Thilo Graf Rothkirch and Piet De Rycker. It is a sequel to the 2004 film Laura's Star, based on the book series by Klaus Baumgart.

The film was released in Germany on 24 September 2009 by Warner Bros. Pictures under their Family Entertainment label, and grossed over $4.2 million at the box office. The film received positive reviews from critics. It was followed by Laura's Star and the Dream Monsters in 2011.

== Synopsis ==
Laura is traveling to China with her family because her mother is participating in an important concert on her cello with Chinese musicians for the Chinese New Year. Her flying star flies with them, but crashes and is found by a Chinese girl named Ling-Ling. She eventually finds Laura because her aunt is also performing at the concert.

The Star then brings a Dragon costume, Nain, to life, and they have fun. However, the dragon is being pursued by a dark, demonic, cloud-shaped force, which, according to an old Chinese legend, wants to prevent spring from ever coming again. The girls attempt to stop the cloud from taking over the dragon.

== Voice cast ==
- Annabel Wolf as Laura
- Mariann Schneider as Ling-Ling
- Dirk Bach as Dragon Nian
- Sandro Iannotta as Tommy
- Brit Gülland as Mama
- Heinrich Schafmeister as Papa
- Susanne Dobrusskin as Aunt

== Release ==
=== Home media ===
The film was released on DVD and Blu-ray by Warner Home Video on 12 March 2010.
