= Little Dodo =

- Theatrical release poster
- Directed by: Thilo Graf Rothkirch; Ute von Münchow-Pohl
- Based on: Kleiner Dodo, was spielst du? by Hans de Beer
- Produced by: Thilo Graf Rothkirch; Maya Gräfin Rothkirch
- Starring: Mario Adorf; Rick Kavanian; Lena Beyerling; Sandro Iannotta
- Music by: Henning Lohner
- Production companies: Rothkirch Cartoon-Film; MABO Pictures Filmproduktion; Comet Film; Warner Bros. Film Productions Germany
- Distributed by: Warner Bros. Pictures
- Release date: 1 January 2008
- Running time: 76 minutes
- Country: Germany
- Language: German
- Box office: $4.5 million

Little Dodo (German: Kleiner Dodo) is a 2008 German animated film directed by Thilo Graf Rothkirch and Ute von Münchow-Pohl, based on the book, Kleiner Dodo, was spielst du? by Dutch author Hans de Beer.

It was released in Germany on 1 January 2008 by Warner Bros. Pictures under their Family Entertainment label. the film received positive reviews and it grossed over $4 million at the box office.

== Plot ==
The little orangutan Dodo, who loves all kinds of noises and imitates them, one day finds a strange object (a thingamajig) that had fallen from a truck. The old orangutan Darwin, who used to live with humans, explains to him that it is a violin and introduces him to the secrets of the instrument. With his violin playing, Dodo not only makes his friends laugh. When a severe drought breaks out, he discovers the great secret of his music.

He proves his courage when his friend and teacher is injured. Dodo undertakes the difficult journey to the human settlement to get medicine for his friend. On the way back, he is able to calm and then heal an injured tiger with the help of his music.

== Cast ==
- Sandro Iannotta as Dodo
- Mario Adorf as Darwin
- Rick Kavanian as Arnold
- Lena Beyerling as Patna
- Volker Wolf as Dodopapa
- Frauke Pollmann as Dodomama
- Thomas Hackenberg as Maki

== Release ==
The film was released on DVD by Warner Home Video on 5 September 2008.

== See also ==
- Life Is a Miracle, Song written for the film, sung by pop group No Angels.
