= The Little Polar Bear 2: The Mysterious Island =

- Theatrical release poster
- German: Der Kleine Eisbär 2: Die Geheimnisvolle Insel
- Directed by: Thilo Graf Rothkirch; Piet De Rycker
- Written by: Rolf Giesen; Bert Schrickel; Thomas Wittenburg
- Based on: The Little Polar Bear by Hans de Beer
- Produced by: Thilo Graf Rothkirch; Maya Gräfin Rothkirch
- Music by: Hans Zimmer; Nick Glennie-Smith
- Production companies: Rothkirch Cartoon-Film; Warner Bros. Film Productions Germany; MaBo Filmproduktion
- Distributed by: Warner Bros. Pictures
- Release date: 29 September 2005
- Running time: 81 minutes
- Country: Germany
- Language: German
- Box office: $9.6 million

The Little Polar Bear 2: The Mysterious Island (German: Der Kleine Eisbär 2: Die Geheimnisvolle Insel) is a 2005 German animated adventure film and the sequel to The Little Polar Bear. It is a film about a little polar bear who makes friends with other Arctic creatures.

The film was distributed in Germany by Warner Bros. Pictures through their Family Entertainment label on 29 September 2005.

== Plot ==
Lars the little polar bear accidentally ends up traveling to the Galapagos archipelago, accompanied by his friends Robby the seal and Caruso the penguin. In the tropical paradise, they meet all sorts of strange and funny animals: birds, crabs and turtles. But when scientists attempt to catch Lars and his mysterious new friend, he'll need the help of all of his friends in order to thwart their plans.

== Voice cast ==
Character	Original actor	English dubbing actor
Lars	Maximilian Artajo	Anjella Macintosh
Greta	Céline Vogt	Helena Roman
Robby	Leander Wolf	Suzy Cooper
Iguanita	Anke Engelke	Anjella Macintosh
Caruso	Dirk Bach	Ben Bishop
Maria	Joy Gruttmann	Melanie Cooper
Kalle	Atze Schröder	Ben Bishop as Brutus
Nalle	Bastian Pastewka	Ray Gillon as Bert
Palle	Oliver Kalkofe	Ben Bishop as Boris
Pepe	Ralf Schmitz	Ray Gillon
Booby	Mirco Nontschew	Ben Bishop
Darwina	Eva Mattes	Anjella Macintosh
Anna	Adak Azdasht	Anjella Macintosh
Pieps	Lisa Mitsching	Anjella Macintosh
Mika	Ingolf Lück	Ben Bishop
Frieda	Anke Engelke	Helena Roman as Nina
Chuco	Max von der Groeben	Max Baldry as Chico
Mother	Brit Gülland	Anjella Macintosh
Carlson	Simon Gosejohann	Tim Everett
Bill	Elton	Ray Gillon
Captain	Tetje Mierendorf	Ben Bishop
Lava Lizard	Birgit Lechtermann	Madga Rodriguez
Little Lizard	Lisann Lechtermann	Ben Bishop
George	Harry Rowohlt	Ray Gillon
Lemmings	Roberto Capitoni; Johann König; Thomas Hackenberg; Michael Koslar	Tim Everett; Ray Gillon; Trevor Swanscott
