= Laura's Star (2004 film) =

2004 German animated feature film

- German theatrical release poster
- Directed by: Thilo Graf Rothkirch; Piet De Rycker
- Written by: Michael Mädel; Piet De Rycker
- Based on: Lauras Stern by Klaus Baumgart
- Produced by: Thilo Graf Rothkirch; Maya Gräfin Rothkirch
- Starring: Mirco Nontschew; Eva Mattes; Heinrich Schafmeister
- Music by: Hans Zimmer; Nick Glennie-Smith
- Production companies: Rothkirch Cartoon-Film; Warner Bros. Film Productions Germany; MABO Pictures Filmproduktion; Comet Film
- Distributed by: Warner Bros. Pictures
- Release date: 23 September 2004
- Running time: 80 minutes
- Country: Germany
- Language: German
- Budget: €10 million
- Box office: $8.7 million

Laura's Star (German: Lauras Stern) is a 2004 German animated feature film produced and directed by Thilo Graf Rothkirch. It is based on the children's book Lauras Stern by Klaus Baumgart. It was released by the German distribution unit of Warner Bros. Pictures under their Family Entertainment label.

== Synopsis ==
Laura is a seven-year-old country girl who just moved with her family to a big city. On her first night in her new neighborhood, she sees a shooting star falling to Earth. Laura finds the star in a park and discovers that it is a living being. The star has severed one of its points during its crash landing. Laura takes the star back home in order to reattach its point with a Band-Aid.

Laura and her younger brother Tommy discover the little star has superpowers and can do amazing things, such as making people fly and bringing inanimate objects to life. However, over time, both notice that the longer the star stays on Earth, the weaker it becomes; its color gradually fades and its powers fail. The siblings and their next-door neighbor Max eventually find a way to send the little star back into outer space.

== Voice cast ==
- Céline Vogt as Laura
- Sandro Iannotta as Tommy
- Maximilian Artajo as Max
- Brit Gülland as Mama
- Heinrich Schafmeister as Papa
- Mirco Nontschew as Mechanical Cat / Bear
- Martin Reinl as Mini Rabbit
- Eva Mattes as Sun
- Peter Fitz as Moon
- Mogens von Gadow as Caretaker
- Hildegard Krekel as Cleaning Woman
- Adrian Wilms as Harry
- Carolin Von der Gröben as Harrys Bande
- Adrian Killian as Harry's Gang Member
- Tobias Klausmann as Harry's Gang Member

== Music ==
The film features the songs "Stay" and "Touch the Sky" by the German band Wonderwall and a film score by Hans Zimmer and Nick Glennie-Smith.

== Accolades ==
- Outstanding Children or Youth Film, German Film Awards, 2005
- Adult Jury Prize – Animated Feature Film or Video, Chicago International Children's Film Festival, 2005

== Home media ==
The film was released direct-to-video in the U.S. on 26 September 2006 by Warner Home Video.

== Sequels and remake ==
In September 2009, Warner Bros. released a sequel, Laura's Star and the Mysterious Dragon Nian, and in October 2011, another one, titled Laura's Star and the Dream Monsters. A live-action remake of the film was released in 2021.
