= Yeti in popular culture =

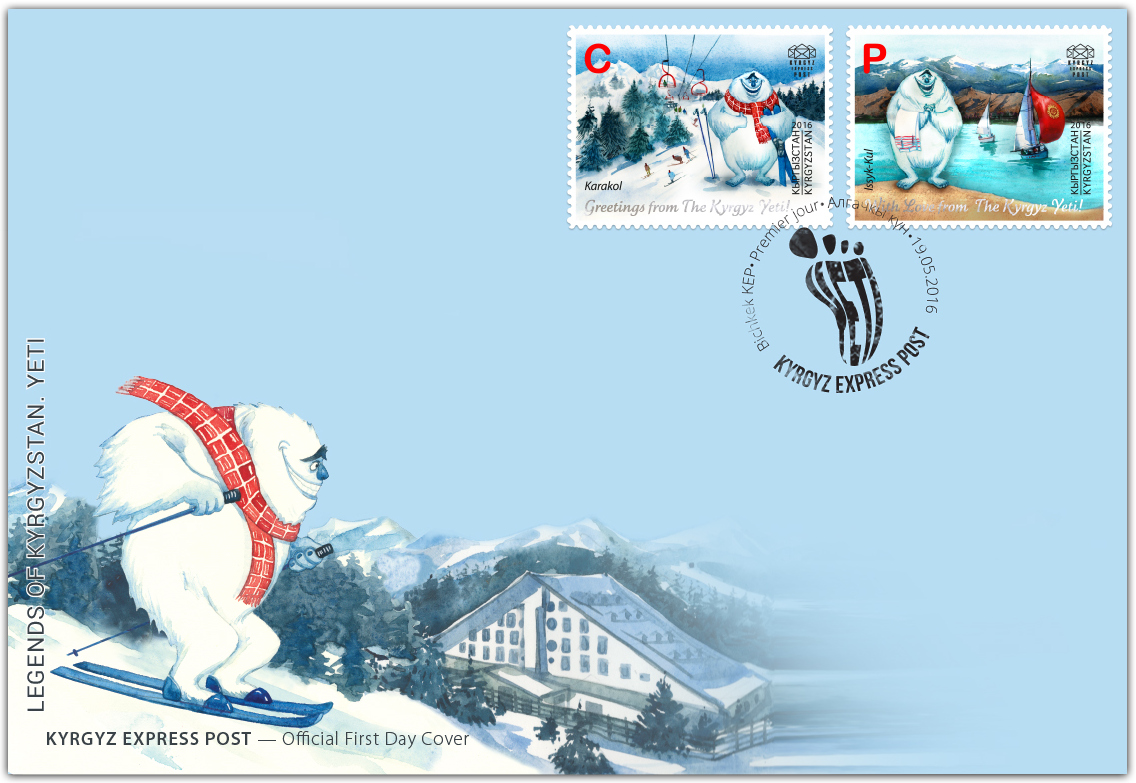
2016 Kyrgyz envelope and stamps dedicated to yeti

The Yeti is an ape-like creature purported to inhabit the Himalayan mountain range in Asia. In Western popular culture, the creature is commonly referred to as the Abominable Snowman. It has regularly been depicted in popular culture of the region as well as in films, literature, music, video games pertaining to the region.

The Himalayan nation Nepal selected Yeti as the mascot for the Visit Nepal 2020.

== Films and television ==
- Pekka ja Pätkä lumimiehen jäljillä (1954), or Pete and Runt on the Trail of the Abominable Snowman, a Finnish comedy film directed by Armand Lohikoski, as an entry into the 13 films long Pekka Puupää series.
- The Snow Creature (1954), film directed by W. Lee Wilder
- The Creature (1955), television play written by Nigel Kneale and directed by Rudolph Cartier. Later remade by Hammer Horror in 1957 as The Abominable Snowman, directed by Val Guest.
- Half Human, or Beast Man Snow Man (1955), film directed by Ishiro Honda
- "The Abominable Snowman", a 1955 episode of Colonel March of Scotland Yard in which members of a British mountaineering club are being menaced by a Yeti.
- Man Beast (1956), film directed by Jerry Warren
- The Abominable Snow Rabbit (1961), an animated short film directed by Chuck Jones and Maurice Noble, introduced Hugo the Abominable Snowman.
- Bumble is the Abominable Snow Monster from the 1964 Christmas television special Rudolph the Red-Nosed Reindeer. He later influenced the portrayal of the yeti who appeared near the end of the film Monsters, Inc.
- Jonny Quest, episode 25 "Monsters In the Monastery" (1965), animated science fiction adventure television series
- In the Doctor Who serials The Abominable Snowmen (1967) and The Web of Fear (1968), multiple robotic Yeti are used as servants of the Great Intelligence, the main antagonist of both stories. One of these Yeti would also be featured in the 20th anniversary special "The Five Doctors".
- Shriek of the Mutilated (1974), film directed by Michael Findlay
- Yeti: Giant of the 20th Century, a 1977 Italian-Canadian giant monster film directed by Gianfranco Parolini (as Frank Kramer), co-written by Parolini, Marcello Coscia, and Mario di Nardo
- The Werewolf and the Yeti (1975), film directed by Miguel Iglesias Bonns, starring Paul Naschy
- Ajooba Kudrat Ka (1991), film directed by Shyam Ramsay and Tulsi Ramsay
- Bullyparade (1997-2002), German comedy series created by Michael Herbig
- Monsters, Inc. (2001), animated film by Disney/Pixar directed by Pete Docter, when the main characters James P. "Sulley" Sullivan (voiced by John Goodman) and Mike Wazowski (voiced by Billy Crystal) are banished by Randall Boggs (voiced by Steve Buscemi), Jeff Fungus (voiced by Frank Oz) and Mr. Henry J. Waternoose III (voiced by James Coburn) takes Boo (voiced by Mary Gibbs) to the secret lab to have her screams extracted to the scream canisters with the scream extractor in the scare and laugh company Monsters, Inc. after being banished in the Himalayas and are rescued by a friendly Abominable Snowman also known as Yeti (voiced by John Ratzenberger) who was among the monsters exiled from Monstropolis.
- The film Monkeybone (2001) features a Yeti (portrayed by Doug Jones) who works at the box office of Down Town's nightmare-showing movie theater called the Morpheum Theater.
- Yeti: A Love Story (2006), film directed by Adam Deyoe and Eric Gosselin
- Lissi und der wilde Kaiser (2007), German animation film, directed by Michael Herbig
- Yeti: Curse of the Snow Demon (2008), telefilm directed by Paul Ziller
- The Mummy: Tomb of the Dragon Emperor (2008), directed by Rob Cohen, where a trio of Yetis helps the heroes fight the villains. This depiction of the Yeti bears a mammalian face.
- Regular Show (2010-2017) features Skips, an immortal yeti, as one of the main characters.
- Snow Beast (2011), film starring John Schneider, features a Yeti-like creature,
- Abominable Christmas (2012), animated telefilm directed by Chad Van De Keere
- Yoko (2012), film directed by Franziska Buch
- Deadly Descent: The Abominable Snowman (2013), telefilm directed by Marko Mäkilaakso
- V.V. Argost, the main antagonist in The Secret Saturdays, is a yeti who seeks to acquire the power of the entity Kur.
- The Disney XD Series Pair of Kings episode "Yeti, Set, Snow" features a tribe of Yetis who live on the snow-capped mountains of Kinkow and are one of the known tribes there.
- In 2016 the Travel Channel released, in the series Expedition Unknown, a special four-part episode titled "Hunt for the Yeti":
- In the 2017 Bengali film Yeti Obhijaan, there is a prologue of gigantic teeth which, as of Yeti, is a primary plot point. Also there are different sightings and PoVs (like Tintin in Tibet) of Yeti is shown through the movie.
- Bullyparade: The Movie (2017), German comedy film, directed by Michael Herbig
- Smallfoot (2018), an animated film directed by Karey Kirkpatrick and Jason Reisig, is focused on Yetis. This depiction of the Yeti has them at 20 ft with no visible noses and horns on their heads.
- Abominable (2019), animated film directed by Jill Culton and Todd Wilderman, has a young Yeti named Everest (vocal effects provided by Joseph Izzo) as a central character. The adult Yetis are shown to be around 30 ft.
- Missing Link (2019), animated film directed by Chris Butler, features a kingdom of Yeti who live in the Himalayas and are led by a paranoid Yeti elder (voiced by Emma Thompson).
- The TV series Mickey Mouse Funhouse features a Yeti (vocal effects provided by Dee Bradley Baker) who resides in the Adventure World of Winter Mountain and sports a dog-like face and ape-like body.
- An episode of The Loud House titled "Snow News Day" detailed an Abominable Snowman sighting in Royal Woods. Liam Hunnicutt later recognizes the Abominable Snowman as his long-lost sheep Roxanne, who was trained to walk on its hind legs and has overgrown wool. Roxanne is eventually reunited with Liam and sheered.

== Literature ==
- Alternate history author Harry Turtledove has written stories as part of the "State of Jefferson Stories" titled "Visitor from the East" (May 2016), "Peace Is Better" (May 2016), "Typecasting" (June 2016), and "Three Men and a Sasquatch" (2019) where Yetis, Sasquatches, and other related cryptids are real. However, unlike common popular depictions of such creatures as less evolved primates, they are essentially another race of human beings, and have been integrated into society.
- ""Wild Man"", a song by Kate Bush from her 2011 album 50 Words for Snow.
- A Yeti serves as a pivotal character in Hergé's 1958-1959 comic book Tintin in Tibet, where it is depicted as an enormous, intelligent and sensitive ape-like creature who saves and protects the young Chinese who is the only survivor of a plane crash.
- Goosebumps has a story called "The Abominable Snowman of Pasadena" where this Abominable Snowman was found in Alaska in a block of ice and can deal with the unmelting snow and ice as seen later in the story. While the Abominable Snowman was a neutral character who was described to have brown fur, a half-human, half-gorilla face, and is around the size of an 11-year-old, the version seen in the films Goosebumps and Goosebumps 2: Haunted Halloween was shown to be 8 ft. with white fur and an ape-like face and is loyal to Slappy the Dummy. Both versions are shown to like trail mix.
- The Yeti are prominently featured in King of the Cloud Forests, a 1987 children's fantasy and adventure novel written by Michael Morpurgo.
- The Abominable is a book by Dan Simmons published in 2013. The Abominable Snowman is a key plot point in the book while also not the main focus of this survival horror fiction.

== Radio ==
- Yehti, a 1955 episode of The Goon Show written by Spike Milligan and Eric Sykes, in which protagonist Neddie Seagoon goes Yeti hunting in Yorkshire.
- "Abominable Snowman", a 1953 episode of the radio thriller series Escape, in which a group of explorers hunt for the creature.

== Video games ==
- In the video game Mr. Nutz, the title character goes through a series of levels before meeting his nemesis Mr. Blizzard who is a yeti.
- The character Bentley and his younger brother Bartholomew in the Spyro video game series are yetis. Both characters were introduced in 2000's Spyro: Year of the Dragon. Additionally, a yeti appears as a level antagonist in both 1999's Spyro 2: Ripto's Rage! and Spyro: Year of the Dragon.
  - The Spyro spinoff series Skylanders also features Slam Bam (voiced by Fred Tatasciore), a four-armed yeti with ice powers, as one of many playable characters, debuting in the first game, Skylanders: Spyro's Adventure.
- In the 2006 video game Titan Quest, Yetis appear as beast enemies in Act III (Orient).
- There is an expansion to the video game Far Cry 4, named "Valley of the Yetis", dedicated to finding a relic in the Himalayas that turns people into Yetis.
- SkiFree by Chris Pirih features a yeti who can eat the player if the player reaches more than 2000m down the slope.
- The 2006 video game The Legend of Zelda: Twilight Princess features a yeti couple who live in an abandoned mansion atop a snowy mountain.
- Mega Man Star Force 2 features a boss by the name of Yeti Blizzard.
- Plants vs. Zombies and most of its sequels and spinoffs have a Yeti Zombie and variants of it.
- Clash of Clans added the Yeti as a troop in 2019.

== Others ==
- Yeti folklore is the theme of Walt Disney World Resort's attraction, Expedition Everest - Legend of the Forbidden Mountain was located in Asia at Disney's Animal Kingdom in Bay Lake, Florida just outside of Orlando, Florida. The Yeti is first depicted in statues, and art in the ride's queue as the guardian of the Forbidden Mountain. Near the ride's station, riders pass through a "Yeti Museum" featuring real Yeti footprint casts, and photos from a "Lost Expedition". The Yeti is then depicted as a destructive creature as seen on the ride sabotaging the railroad. It features a 25-foot-tall (7.6 m) audio-animatronic Yeti which appears near the end of the ride attacking the guests. The creature is depicted more accurately to Tibetan descriptions of the Yeti as a brown coated Ape like creature. Imagineers designed the Yeti based on Gigantopithecus, and the Snub-nosed monkey.
- Disneyland's Matterhorn Bobsleds features a Yeti dubbed Harold by the imaginers that was added to the ride in 1978 after the ride opened. Around the mountain, footprint casts depicting an unknown animal are shown along with a warning sign of the Yeti being spotted. The Yeti is shown 3 times during the ride first on the lift hill, and twice as an animatronic. The creature's original design was depicted as an ape like creature with bright red eyes, a cat like face, dark blue skin, and white fur. In 2015, the design was updated into a more gorilla like animal.
- Yetis is the mascot of Cleveland Community College in Shelby, North Carolina.
- Yeti Airlines is a prominent domestic airline in Nepal.
- In Monster High, the Yeti has a daughter named Abbey Bominable.
- Utah Yeti is one of the names finalised for the Utah NHL Team in an online voting.
