= Diana Herold =

German photomodel and actress (born 1974)

Diana Herold (born 27 January 1974 in Sangerhausen) is a German model, presenter, and actress. She became known for her dance interludes and mostly silent appearances in the comedy programme Bullyparade on ProSieben. She also appeared in several films by the comedian Michael "Bully" Herbig.

== Life ==
After a commercial apprenticeship, Diana Herold was discovered in 1997 by a casting agency for Bullyparade, for which she worked until the programme was cancelled in 2002. In 1998, she was an assistant to Reinhold Beckmann in Guinness - Die Show der Rekorde for Das Erste.

In 2002, Herold appeared in an extra role in the film Der Schuh des Manitu, and in 2004 as an extra in (T)Raumschiff Surprise. She also appeared in the ProSieben reality soap opera Die Alm in 2004. She also appeared as a presenter on the DSF television channel from 2005 to 2006. She then hosted a call-in quiz programme on the former television channel Das Vierte in 2006.

She received her first major supporting role in 2007 in the crime thriller Murder in bester Gesellschaft. In it, she played Armin Rohde's girlfriend who pretends to be Russian.

In 2008, Herold took part in the cookery show The Perfect Celebrity Dinner and in 2010 she was a participant in the smoking cessation docu-soap Don't smoke on the water. In September 2013, she also took part in the styling documentary Promi Shopping Queen and won with 34 points. In 2002 and 2017, photo series of her appeared in Playboy. In 2020, she and her husband Michael Tomaschautzki were participants in Das Sommerhaus der Stars - Kampf der Promipaare.

Herold has a daughter (* 1994) and a son (* 2010). She lives in Schwabach. In 1993 she married for the first time and in 2017 the business economist Tomaschautzki, the father of her son.. She later qualified as a mental health coach.

== Films ==
- 2000: Models (TV film)
- 2001: Der Schuh des Manitu
- 2002: Das Bully Spezial - Traumschiff (short film)
- 2002: Das Bully Spezial - Sissi (short film)
- 2004: (T)Raumschiff Surprise - Periode 1
- 2005: Macho im Schleudergang (TV film)
- 2017: Bullyparade - Der Film
- 2017: Macho Man 2

== TV series ==
- 1997-2002: Bullyparade
- 2002: Blondes Gift
- 2007: Murder in Best Company (eine Folge)
- 2008: Maja (one episode)
- 2009: Heilfasten auf St. Lucia
- 2010: Ein Haus voller Töchter (one episode)

== Reality TV formats ==
- 1998: Guinness Show of Records
- 2000: The Ingo Appelt Show (one episode)
- 2004: Die Alm (first season)
- 2008: Das perfekte Promi-Dinner (one episode)
- 2010: Don't smoke on the water
- 2013: Promi Shopping Queen (one episode)
- 2020: Das Sommerhaus der Stars - Kampf der Promipaare
- 2021: Die Festspiele der Reality Stars - Wer ist die hellste Kerze?
