= Das Kanu des Manitu =

2025 German parody film

- Theatrical release poster
- German: Das Kanu des Manitu
- Directed by: Michael Herbig
- Written by: Michael Herbig
- Based on: Winnetou by Karl May; Bullyparade by Michael Bully Herbig
- Produced by: Michael Herbig
- Starring: Michael Herbig; Christian Tramitz; Rick Kavanian; Sky du Mont; Jasmin Schwiers; Jessica Schwarz; Friedrich Mücke
- Production companies: Constantin Film; herbX film; SevenPictures
- Distributed by: Constantin Film
- Release date: 14 August 2025 (Germany)
- Running time: 88 minutes
- Country: Germany
- Language: German

Das Kanu des Manitu (transl. Manitou's Canoe) is a 2025 German Western parody film directed by Michael "Bully" Herbig, based on a screenplay by him, Christian Tramitz, and Rick Kavanian. The film is a sequel to Der Schuh des Manitu (2001); which is based on skits from the TV series Bullyparade (1997–2002), which in turn are based on the Winnetou novels of Karl May. Starring Herbig, Tramitz, Kavanian, and Sky du Mont reprising their roles from the first film, with Jasmin Schwiers, Jessica Schwarz and Friedrich Mücke joining the cast, the film follows the Apache chief Abahachi and his cowboy blood brother Ranger who are being framed by a ruthless gang and must team up with old friends to find a legendary canoe before a grand conspiracy destroys the West.

The comedy film was released in German cinemas on 14 August 2025. With more than 5 million admissions, it is the most successful German film of 2025, the most successful German film since the COVID-19 pandemic, and the 13th most successful German film since 1990.

== Plot ==
When a train is robbed, the description of the perpetrators points to the two friends Abahachi and Ranger. The completely unsuspecting blood brothers are therefore arrested by Sheriff Kane and his deputy Sheriff Ratford. Since they are also accused of other robberies, they are to be executed on the gallows the next day.

Behind the robberies is a new seven-member gang led by a woman known only as the Boss. Two members of the gang had disguised themselves as Abahachi and Ranger for camouflage. On behalf of a mysterious oil baron, the gang is now supposed to take possession of the legendary canoe of Manitou, which belongs to the Apache tribe. Because they need an Apache for this, they plan to shoot Abahachi from the gallows the next day and kidnap him as he escapes.

Meanwhile, Dimitri learns that his two friends are to be executed. Although he is in the middle of preparations for the opening of a Greek restaurant, he immediately sets off. His new employee Mary also travels with him, saving his life during a robbery. Mary and Dimitri develop feelings for each other during their journey.

When Abahachi and Ranger stand in front of the gallows, Abahachi is first shot free by the bandits, but Ranger is also saved thanks to a shot from Dimitri. Mary and Ranger use an invented language to communicate. A little later, Abahachi, Ranger, Dimitri and Mary arrive at a secret meeting place. It turns out that Mary is Ranger's daughter.

The very next morning, the group is tracked down and captured by the Boss' gang. Together they ride to the cave where Abahachi's father once hid Manitou's canoe. According to legend, the canoe is said to give eternal life to the person who crosses the lake with it. The Boss sends Abahachi, Ranger and Mary into the cave, while Dimitri is held hostage. In the cave, the three friends have to face a series of life-threatening tests.

In his search for the escaped blood brothers, Sheriff Kane comes across Abahachi's gay twin brother Winnetouch, who has now opened a rumba dance school. During the interrogation by the sheriff, smoke signals produced by Dimitri rise into the air. Winnetouch realizes that his brother needs help and sets off for the cave together with the sheriff.

In the cave, the final test requires that the one who acquires the canoe must be a real Apache. Abahachi then confesses his long-standing secret that he is in fact not of Native American descent, but of Bavarian-Asian descent. After the villain Santa Maria raided the settler trek with his parents, the Apaches adopted him and Winnetouch. Mary points out that the exam requires being a true Apache, which is different from real Apache. Abahachi and his friends manage to get into the canoe. As the water level rises, they are washed out of the cave into the nearby lake.

When the friends get out of the lake, the oil baron arrives, turning out to be Santa Maria who survived the end of the first film because the pit was not deep enough. A little later, Winnetouch reaches the place. The battle-hardened Winnetouch succeeds in incapacitating the gang, and Sheriff Kane recognizes the innocence of Abahachi and Ranger.

However, Santa Maria, unnoticed by everyone except Abahachi, makes off with the canoe. He does not expect eternal life from the canoe, but only the most lucrative sale possible. Santa Maria and Abahachi fight first on horseback, then in a train. In the process, the canoe shatters. In addition, the train is directed onto the wrong tracks and falls down a high cliff with both of them. Abahachi is able to jump off the train at the last moment. In addition, he got the treasure from the previous film.

Dimitri and Mary marry. With Ranger at his side, Abahachi confesses his true origins to the Apaches. The Apaches, however, make him understand that they have always known about it and that he is still one of them.

In the post-credit scene, Santa Maria can be seen surviving again thanks to a parachute.

== Cast ==
- Michael Herbig: Abahachi / Winnetouch
- Christian Tramitz: Ranger
- Rick Kavanian: Dimitri / Deputy Ratford
- Jasmin Schwiers: Mary
- Jessica Schwarz: The Boss
- Friedrich Mücke: Sheriff Kane
- Sky du Mont: Santa Maria
- Daniel Zillmann: Little Rock
- Tutty Tran: Bullet
- Tobias van Dieken: Serge
- Pit Bukowski: Dynamite
- Akeem van Flodrop: J.K.
- Merlin Sandmeyer: Wolfgang
- Waldemar Kobus: Engine driver Lukas
- Jacob Katana: Prince
- Sabrina Schieder: Young woman
- Jan van Weyde: Judge
- Ilona Schulz: Mrs Wolf
- Anna Thalbach: Fortune teller (voice)

== Production ==
Filming took place over 44 days of filming from 26 August to 2 November 2024, in Munich, Almería, Valencia and Santa Fe, New Mexico. The cave recreated for the filming replaced the arena from the film Asterix and Obelix vs. Caesar in the Bavaria Filmstadt, which had been located there since 1999. 800 cubic metres (28,000 cu ft) of polystyrene were used for the construction.

The film was produced by herbX film by Michael Herbig, distributed by Constantin Film. The production was supported by the German Federal Film Board, the German Film Fund, and the FilmFernsehFonds Bayern. RTL was also involved.

Alexander Dittner was responsible for the editing and the music was again written by Ralf Wengenmayr. The production design was designed by Bernd Lepel, the costume design by Anke Winckler, the make-up design by Anna Freund and Tanja Holznagel and the sound by Roland Winke. Sky du Mont decided during filming to end his film career after this film. In the last minutes of the film, Friedrich Schoenfelder can be heard again as the narrator, but he died in 2011; with the help of artificial intelligence and with the consent of his widow, a voice profile was generated from archive recordings to create the appropriate tone of voice.

Three years before the release of the film, Herbig had said in the talk show 3 nach 9 on Radio Bremen that he was not planning a parody of the Karl May films: "The comedy police have become so strict" that the shooting of a comedy has become much more difficult, "because you have the feeling that you are stepping on people's toes very quickly". In an interview, Herbig added that discussions about political correctness and cultural appropriation had inspired him and his team to specifically look for ways to undermine this. The indigenous medicine man to whom Abahachi confesses his story at the end is played by Alan Tafoya, a real Jicarilla Apache of the Red Side Plains People. The scene was filmed in their territory at the Ghost Ranch in northern New Mexico. Other topics such as feminism and ableism are also addressed in the film.

In an interview, Herbig revealed that the film cost €13–18 million.

== Release ==
It premiered on 12 August 2025, at the Mathäser Filmpalast in Munich, and the film was released in German cinemas on 14 August 2025. The film was also released in IMAX format.

The film was released on Prime Video on 15 December 2025, and was released on DVD and Blu-ray on 2 January 2026.
