= Christian Tramitz =

German actor (born 1955)

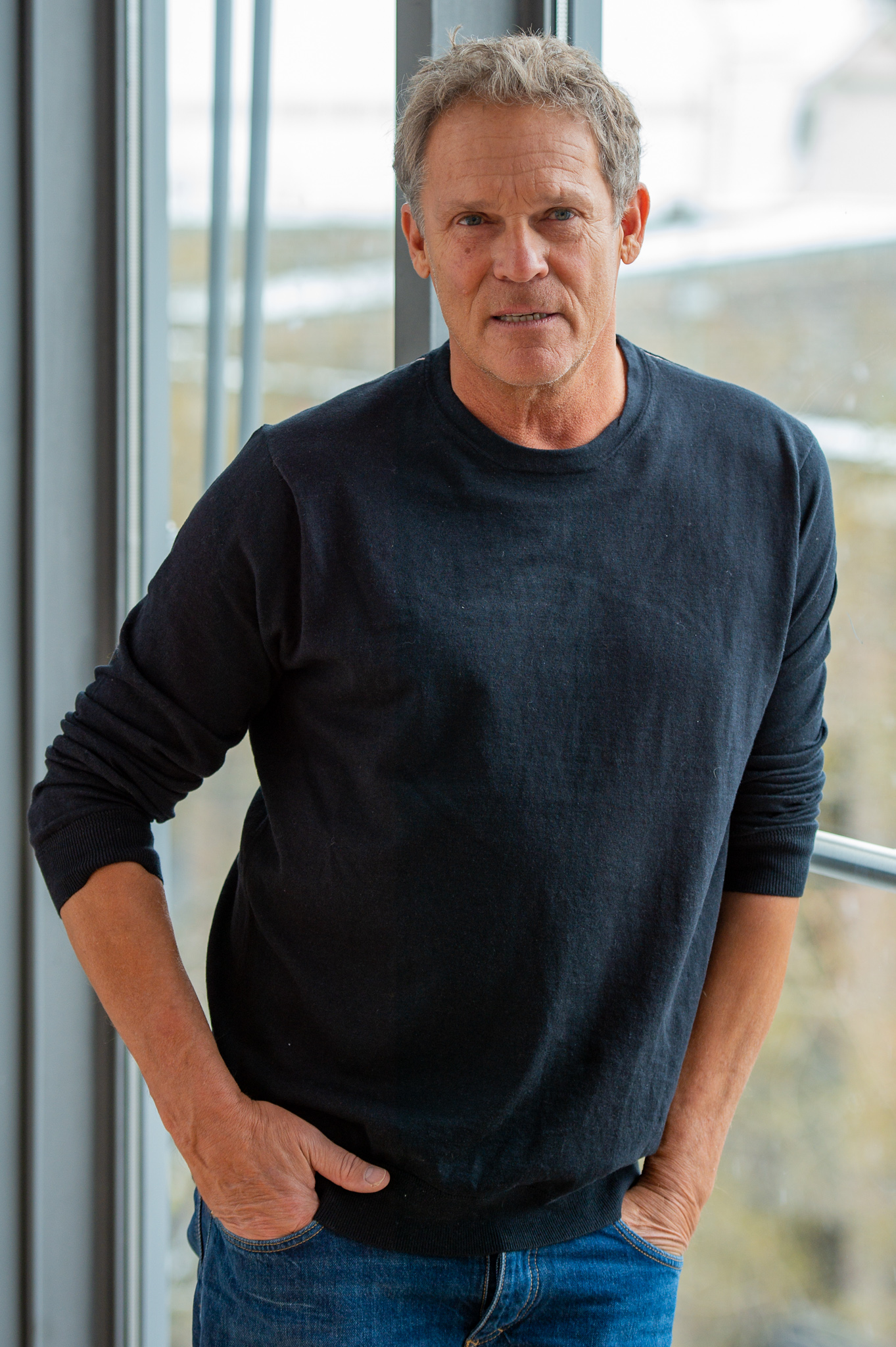
- Tramitz in 2019
- Born: 13 July 1955 (age 71); Munich, West Germany
- Occupations: Actor, voice actor, comedian
- Years active: 1981–present

Christian Tramitz (born 13 July 1955) is a German actor and comedian.

== Early life ==
Born in Munich, Bavaria, Tramitz is the grandson of Austrian actor Paul Hörbiger and first cousin once removed of actress Christiane Hörbiger. His parents are film producer Rudolf Tramitz and Monica (née Hörbiger). Actress Mavie Hörbiger is a cousin.

Instead of starting an acting career at once, he first began to study history of art, philosophy and drama. Apart from that he took lessons in acting from Ruth von Zerboni and violin lessons in the Munich "Musikkonservatorium".

== Career ==
Tramitz made his first media experience at the Munich radio station "Radio Gong", where he, together with Michael "Bully" Herbig presented the show Die Bayern Cops. In December 1996, he appeared in the German television program Isar 3, which was based on Die Bayern Cops. From 1997 on, he was a member of the German comedy TV series Bullyparade with Herbig and Rick Kavanian.

=== Tramitz and Friends ===
After the end of Bullyparade in 2002, Tramitz got his first own comedy show named Tramitz and Friends on ProSieben in 2004.

In this show he performed different sketches with various other famous actors including Annett Fleischer or Helmfried von Lüttichau.

=== Voice acting ===
Tramitz used to dub various actors and voice acted different animated characters in the 1980s, like Matt Dillon (for example in Wild Things or One Night at McCool's), Captain Gray Edwards (Final Fantasy, originally spoken by Alec Baldwin), Jackie Chan (Half a Loaf of Kung Fu, Police Story 3), John Cusack (Class), John Ritter (Noises Off), Ben Stiller (If Lucy Fell), David Schwimmer (Six Days, Seven Nights) as well as Ted McGinley as Jefferson D'Arcy in Married... with Children, Jim J. Bullock as Neal Tanner in ALF, Greg Evigan as Jake Cardigan in TekWar as well as Stiletto Mafioso in Danger Mouse.

Apart from that he also dubbed Ted Mosby in How I Met Your Mother, Asterix in Asterix and the Vikings and Chick Hicks in Cars.

He later became the German voice cast of Scrad/Charlie (Johnny Knoxville) in Men in Black II.

== Private life ==
In 2004, Tramitz married his second wife, Annette, and has a daughter and a son with her. He also has twins from his first marriage to German publicist Christiane Tramitz. Christian Tramitz lives in Münsing at Lake Starnberg.

== Filmography ==
=== Cinema ===
- 2000: Erkan & Stefan
- 2001: Der Schuh des Manitu
- 2004: Traumschiff Surprise – Periode 1
- 2004: 7 Dwarves – Men Alone in the Wood
- 2006: Französisch für Anfänger
- 2006: 7 Zwerge – Der Wald ist nicht genug
- 2007: Neues vom Wixxer
- 2007: Lissi und der wilde Kaiser
- 2007: Tell
- 2007: Keinohrhasen
- 2008: Falco – Verdammt, wir leben noch!
- 2008: Freche Mädchen
- 2009: Mord ist mein Geschäft, Liebling
- 2010: Jerry Cotton
- 2015: Gut zu Vögeln
- 2015: Ghosthunters on Icy Trails (also writer)
- 2015: Beautiful Girl
- 2015: Traumfrauen
- 2017: Bullyparade – Der Film
- 2018: Feierabendbier
- 2022: Die Geschichte der Menschheit - leicht gekürzt

=== Television ===
- 1988: Three D
- 1995: Der Höschenmörder
- 1995: Polizeiruf 110, episode 177, Roter Kaviar
- 1996: Der Bulle von Tölz, episode 5: Tod am Altar (as Father Martin Petermeier)
- 1997: Der Bulle von Tölz, episode 7: Bei Zuschlag Mord (as auctionator)
- 1997: Hunger – Sehnsucht nach Liebe
- 1997–2002: Bullyparade
- 2000: Zwei Brüder – Mörderische Rache
- 2002: Finanzamt Mitte – Helden im Amt
- 2002: Was ist bloß mit meinen Männern los?
- 2003: Crazy Race
- 2003: MA 2412 – Die Staatsdiener
- 2004: Tramitz & Friends (2nd Season 2005, 3rd Season 2007)
- 2006: Agathe kann's nicht lassen – Die Tote im Bootshaus
- 2006: Die ProSieben Märchenstunde – Zwerg Nase
- 2006: Die ProSieben Märchenstunde – Rotkäppchen
- 2006: Crocodile Alert
- 2006: Ladyland
- 2006: Rettet die Weihnachtsgans
- 2007: Die ProSieben Märchenstunde – Schneewittchen
- 2007: Die ProSieben Märchenstunde – Des Kaisers neue Kleider
- 2007: Treasure Island
- 2008: H3 – Halloween Horror Hostel
- 2008: Alarm für Cobra 11, episode Auf eigene Faust
- 2011: Stankowski's Millions
- since 2011: Hubert und Staller / (since 2019) Hubert ohne Staller

=== Dubbing ===
- 1981: Danger Mouse (Stilleto)
- 1990: Saber Rider and the Star Sheriffs (Colt)
- 1991: Tropical Heat (Nick Sloughter)
- 1991-1997: Married... with Children (Jefferson D'Arcy)
- 1991-1992: Darkwing Duck (Steelbeak)
- 1995-2001: Xena: Warrior Princess – narrator at the opening
- 2000: South Park: Bigger, Longer & Uncut Phillip
- 2002: Final Fantasy: The Spirits Within (Captain Gray Edwards)
- 2002: Men in Black II (Scrad/Charlie)
- 2003: Finding Nemo (Marlin)
- 2005: Steamboy
- 2005: Herbie: Fully Loaded
- since 2005: How I Met Your Mother (old Ted from 2030, narrator)
- 2006: Asterix and the Vikings (Asterix)
- 2006: Cars (Chick Hicks)
- 2007: Lissi und der wilde Kaiser (Kaiser)
- 2008: Tinker Bell (Boble)
- 2008: The Simpsons (Sideshow Bob)
- 2008: Bolt (Bolt)
- 2008: Ponyo (Fujimoto)
