= Jumbo Schreiner =

German actor, presenter and dripmaster

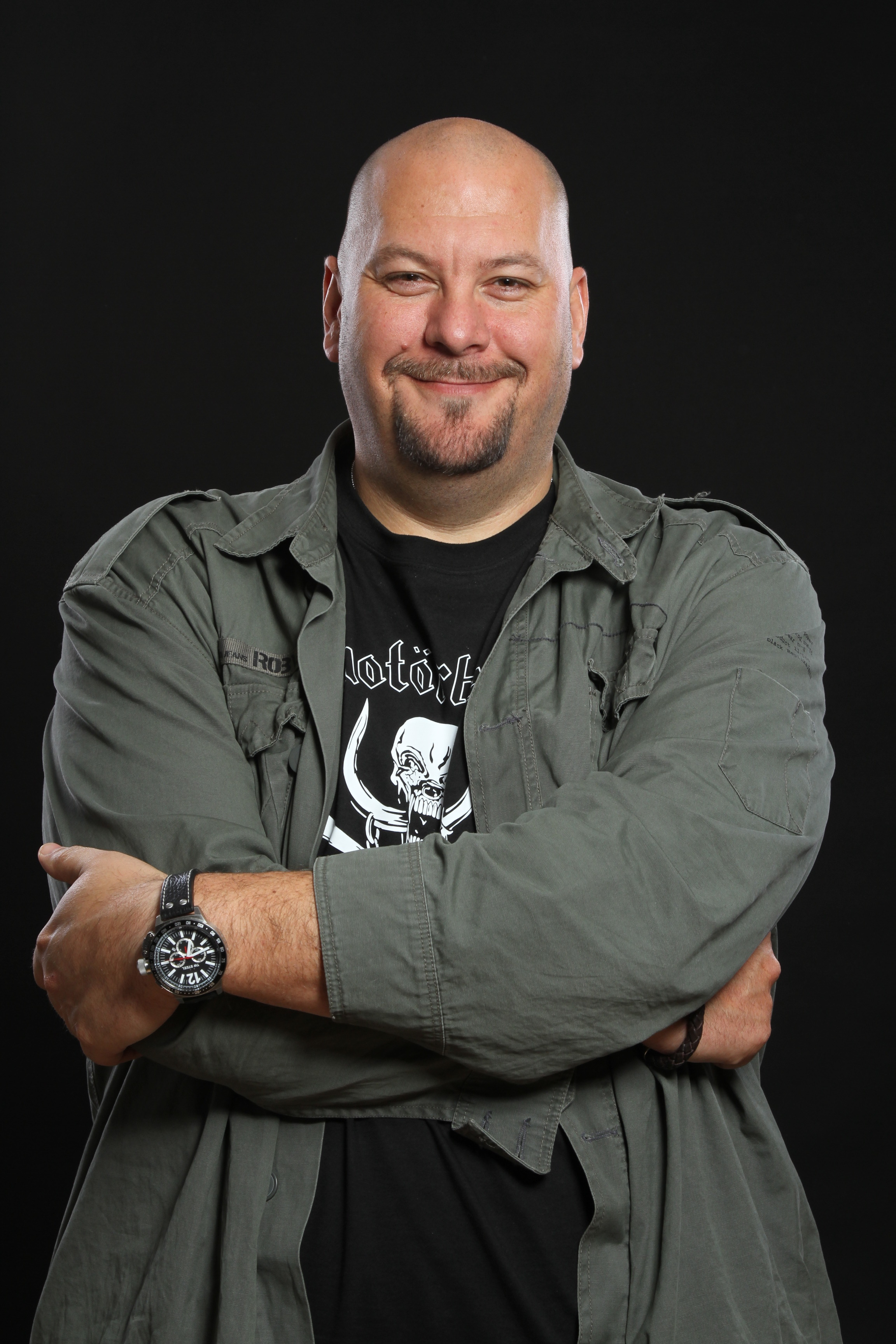
Schreiner in 2010

Thomas "Jumbo" Schreiner (born 24 November 1967 in Munich) is a German actor and presenter

== Filmography ==
- Nitro (2006) as The Bonehead
- The Wild Soccer Bunch 3 (2006) - Bodyguard B
- Tramitz & Friends (2005) - Guard
- Die Anonymen Mobiholiker (short, 2005)
- C(r)ook (2004) - Tyson
- Traumschiff Surprise – Periode 1 (2004) - Bad knight
- Bully & Rick (2004) as Jumbo
- Bomb 'n Venice (2001, as Thomas Schreiner) - Igor's bodyguard
- Bullyparade (2000–2001) - The Rocker
- Erkan & Stefan (2000) - Corvette Branko (uncredited)
- Tatort (2000, as Thomas Schreiner) - Latino
