= Bullyparade: The Movie =

2017 German parody film by Michael Herbig

- Theatrical release poster
- Directed by: Michael Herbig
- Written by: Michael Herbig
- Based on: Bullyparade by Michael Bully Herbig
- Produced by: Michael Herbig
- Starring: Michael Herbig; Christian Tramitz; Rick Kavanian; Sky du Mont
- Cinematography: Torsten Breuer
- Edited by: Alexander Dittner
- Music by: Ralf Wengenmayr
- Production companies: Herbx Film; Warner Bros. Film Productions Germany
- Distributed by: Warner Bros. Pictures
- Release date: 17 August 2017
- Running time: 96 minutes
- Language: German
- Box office: $16 million

Bullyparade: The Movie (German: Bullyparade – Der Film) is a 2017 German parody movie. Directed by Michael Herbig, it is a film adaptation of his ProSieben television show Bullyparade and features parodies of popular films and television series such as Star Trek, Star Wars, Barbarella, Sissi, Winnetou, Django Unchained, and The Wolf of Wall Street.

== Plot ==
The movie consists of five episodes that refer to elements of the TV show Bullyparade:

- Back to the Zone: A parody of Back to the Future, the Saxon brothers Jens and Jörg Kasirske want to prevent the fall of the Berlin wall in the year 1989 and the concert of David Hasselhoff which happened at this event. With a modified Trabant, they travel back in time to take part in the press conference of Günter Schabowski which is also visited by the Czech reporters Pavel Pipovič and Bronko Kulička.
- Winnetou in love: Blood brothers Winnetou and Old Shatterhand argue during a conference with other Native American tribes and diverge.15 years later, Winnetou wants to marry Annette, daughter of General Motors. Old Shatterhand, who now operates a boat hire in the desert, should be his best man. But Shatterhand is chased by the bounty hunters Dr. Schmitz and his hand puppet Tschango, because he shot Abraham Lincoln by mistake. As the blood brothers arrive at Annette and General Motors, Old Shatterhand notices that Motors only wants to gain the land of the Apache. He can convince Winnetou to prevent this transaction.
- Sissi – Menopause of an Empress: Emperor Franz, empress Sissi and their field marshal are in search for a weekend house and have to stay in a Haunted house, because the estate agent arrives to late.
- Lutz of Wall Street: Lutz was caught while travelling without paying. Now he needs to pay 60 dollars fee or he has to go to prison. With the help of the broker Mr. Moneymaker, he earns many million dollars at the Wall Street with his laughter. Unluckily, Lutz spends all of the money.
- The Planet of Woman: The crew of the (T)Raumschiff Surprise (U.S.S. Hasselhoff) around Captain Kork, Mr. Spuck and Schrotty should protect the planet of women of the clone army around King Clone, because they try to cut the women's hair to use it for toupees. Later, they get help by the beverage suppliers Sigi Solo and the Yeti.

== Cast ==
Role	Actor/Actress
Narrator	Andreas Fröhlich
Winnetou	Michael Herbig
Castanet 1	Michael Herbig
Sissi	Michael Herbig
King Ludwig	Michael Herbig
Lutz	Michael Herbig
Brigitte Spuck	Michael Herbig
Sigi Solo	Michael Herbig
C.L.A.U.S	Michael Herbig
Jens Kasirske	Rick Kavanian
Pavel Pipovič	Rick Kavanian
Dr. Schmitz	Rick Kavanian
Tschango	Rick Kavanian
Castanet 3	Rick Kavanian
Registrar	Rick Kavanian
Field marshal	Rick Kavanian
Dimitri	Rick Kavanian
Löffler	Rick Kavanian
Schrotty	Rick Kavanian
King Clone	Rick Kavanian
Clones	Rick Kavanian
Yeti	Rick Kavanian
James Beam	Rick Kavanian
Jörg Kasirske	Christian Tramitz
Bronko Kulička	Christian Tramitz
David Hasselhoff	Christian Tramitz
Old Shatterhand	Christian Tramitz
Castanet 2	Christian Tramitz
Franz	Christian Tramitz
Mr. Moneymaker	Christian Tramitz
Captain Jürgen Thorsten Kork	Christian Tramitz
Annette	Cornelia Ivancan
General Motors	Sky du Mont
Lieutenant	Alexander Schubert
Costa	Irshad Panjatan
Babsirella	Jeanne Goursaud
Susirella	Jasmin Lord
Monirella	Laura Berlin
Mozzarella	Jane Chirwa
Doublerella 1	Denise Balaz
Doublerella 2	Desire Balaz
Bridesmaid	Ivanka Brekalo
Medicine man	Robert Alan Peckard
Tschimalis	Larimar López Arcos
Apanatschi	María Del Pilar Gómez
Chief of the Kiowa	Laurence Burton
Chief of the Assiniboine	Vincente Raul Gonzalez
Barmaid Mary Ann	Diana Herold
Farmer Nancy	Valentina Zell
Asian investor	Kim Girschner
Waiter	Jürgen Klaar
Ronaldo	Steffen Jung
Simultaneous translator	Rahul Chakraborty
Anchorman	Liu Hao
Advisor	Meikel Engelmann

=== Cameos ===
- Stefan Mross as Sergeant Mross (Winnetou in Love)
- Til Schweiger as Sheriff Chiller (Winnetou in Love)
- Elyas M'Barek as Chief of the Sioux (Winnetou in Love)
- Jürgen Vogel as Patient Prince Otto / Klaus Kinski (Menopause of an Empress)
- Matthias Schweighöfer as Stockbroker (Lutz of Wall Street)
- Lena Meyer-Landrut as Brunette siren of the Planet of woman (The Planet of Women)
- Lena Gercke as Blonde siren of the Planet of woman (The Planet of Women)
- Peter Maffay as himself (The Planet of Women)

== See also ==
- Bullyparade
- Karl May film adaptations
