= List of highest-grossing films in Germany =

This list charts the most successful films at cinemas in Germany by admissions. It also lists the most popular German productions in terms of box office sales, in euros and admissions. The Jungle Book, initially released in 1968 but with subsequent reissues, is Germany's biggest film of all time since 1963 in terms of admissions with 27.3 million tickets sold, nearly 10 million more than Titanic's 18.8 million tickets sold. It has grossed an estimated $108 million in Germany making it the third highest-grossing film of all time in Germany behind only Avatar (2009) ($137 million) and Titanic (1997) ($125 million). Der Schuh des Manitu (2001) is the highest-grossing German production with a gross of €63 million and a record (since 1962) 11.7 million admissions. The 1953 East German film Die Geschichte vom kleinen Muck had the most admissions for a film from East Germany with almost 13 million.

== Most successful films by admissions ==
The table below lists the most successful films in Germany since 1963 in terms of admissions. The Jungle Book is Germany's biggest film of all time in terms of admissions with 27.3 million tickets sold, nearly 10 million more than Titanic's 18.8 million tickets sold.

Rank	Title	Year	Admissions
1	The Jungle Book	1968	27,290,763
2	Titanic	1998	18,812,740
3	Once Upon a Time in the West	1969	13,012,746
4	Doctor Zhivago	1966	12,750,000
5	Harry Potter and the Philosopher's Stone	2001	12,595,323
6	Trinity Is Still My Name	1972	12,267,000
7	The Lord of the Rings: The Fellowship of the Ring	2001	11,930,785
8	The Lion King	1994	11,899,893
9	Der Schuh des Manitu	2001	11,721,183
10	Avatar	2009	11,311,518
11	The Aristocats	1971	11,294,126
12	Thunderball	1965	11,250,000
13	The Silence	1964	11,000,000
14	The Lord of the Rings: The Two Towers	2002	10,753,596
15	Pretty Woman	1990	10,625,337
16	The Lord of the Rings: The Return of the King	2003	10,442,102
17	Goldfinger	1965	10,250,000
18	Avatar: The Way of Water	2022	10,198,391
19	Treasure of Silver Lake	1962	10,000,000
20	Apache Gold	1963	10,000,000
21	The Rescuers	1977	9,767,049
22	Harry Potter and the Chamber of Secrets	2002	9,728,779
23	Jurassic Park	1993	9,395,450
24	Independence Day	1996	9,272,424
25	Traumschiff Surprise – Periode 1	2004	9,165,932
26	The Intouchables	2012	9,162,715
27	Star Wars: The Force Awakens	2015	9,060,311
28	You Only Live Twice	1967	9,000,000
29	Star Wars: Episode I – The Phantom Menace	1999	8,962,516
30	Finding Nemo	2003	8,839,084

=== Highest-grossing films prior to 1963 ===
The most successful films released prior to 1963 based on theatrical rentals in Deutschmarks to February 1984 were: (Note: For comparison with the table above, Variety reported the following films released after 1963 with rentals of over 18 million Deutschmarks by February 1984: Doctor Zhivago 39 million DM The Jungle Book 33 million DM E.T. the Extra-terrestrial 25 million DM The Rescuers 22 million DM From Here to Eternity 20 million DM Once Upon A Time in the West 18 million DM Jaws 18 million DM Octopussy 18 million DM)

Rank	Title	Year	Rentals DM
1	Ben-Hur	1959	32.0
2	Gone With the Wind	1939	30.0
3	The Bridge on the River Kwai	1957	24.0
4	From Here to Eternity	1953	20.0

== List of highest-grossing German productions ==
Rank	Title	Year	Gross €
1	Der Schuh des Manitu	2001	65,131,251
2	Fack ju Göhte 2	2015	63,053,180
3	Honig im Kopf	2014	58,753,283
4	Fack ju Göhte	2013	55,020,105
5	Fack ju Göhte 3	2017	53,379,757
6	Traumschiff Surprise – Periode 1	2004	51,276,038
7	The Perfect Secret	2019	47,029,498
8	The Hunger Games: Mockingjay - Part 2	2015	41,957,829
9	Keinohrhasen	2007	40,480,446
10	Good Bye, Lenin	2003	38,971,731

=== Most successful German productions by admissions ===
The following are the most successful German productions ranked by admissions in Germany since 1962, excluding those produced in East Germany between 1945-1990 (see separate list below).

Rank	Title	Year	Admissions
1	Der Schuh des Manitu	2001	11,721,183
2	Treasure of Silver Lake	1962	10,000,000
3	Apache Gold	1963	10,000,000
4	Traumschiff Surprise – Periode 1	2004	9,165,932
5	Otto – Der Film	1985	8,776,026
6	Fack ju Göhte 2	2015	7,698,547
7	Old Shatterhand	1964	7,500,000
8	Fack ju Göhte	2013	7,383,322
9	Honig im Kopf	2014	7,274,964
10	Schulmädchen-Report	1970	7,000,000

=== Most successful films in East Germany based on admissions ===
Below is a list of the most successful films produced in the Soviet occupation zone of Germany (1945–49) and East Germany (1949-1990). Films prior to 1949 include admissions from West Berlin and the west zones.

Rank	Title	Year	Admissions
1	Die Geschichte vom kleinen Muck	1953	12,998,352
2	Ehe im Schatten	1947	12,888,153
3	Heart of Stone	1950	9,779,526
4	The Sons of Great Bear	1966	9,422,395
5	Raid	1947	8,090,000
6	Snow White	1961	7,597,495
7	Street Acquaintances	1948	6,469,627
8	The Murderers Are Among Us	1946	6,468,921
9	The Merry Wives of Windsor	1950	6,090,329
10	My Wife Makes Music	1958	6,052,050

== See also ==
- Lists of highest-grossing films
- Goldene Leinwand
