= Goldene Leinwand =

German award

The Goldene Leinwand (Golden Screen) is an award created in 1964 by the HDF ("Hauptverband Deutscher Filmtheater e.V.", literally translated "Main Association For Movie Theatres") and the journal Filmecho/Filmwoche.

Like a Golden Record, it is a sales certification.

The Goldene Leinwand is to be bestowed upon film distributors for having provided a film of feature length which sold more than 3,000,000 tickets within 18 months.

== Categories ==
- Goldene Leinwand (“Golden Screen”) for 3 million tickets within 18 months
- Goldene Leinwand mit Stern (“Golden Screen with Star”) for 6 million tickets within 18 months
- Goldene Leinwand mit 2 Sternen (“Golden Screen with Two Stars”) for 9 million tickets within 18 months
- Goldene Leinwand mit 3 Sternen (“Golden Screen with Three Stars”) for 12 million tickets within 18 months
- Goldene Leinwand Sonderausgaben (“Golden Screen Special Editions”) for 15 or 18 million tickets within 18 months
- Goldene Leinwand mit Stern und Brillanten (“Golden Screen with Star and Diamond”) for a series of 6 coherent films that altogether sold more than 30 million tickets
- Goldene Leinwand für besondere Verdienste (“Honorary Golden Screen”)
- Goldene Leinwand Pin (“Honorary Golden Screen as Pin”)

Titanic is the only feature film that was awarded special editions for 15 and/or 18 million tickets.

The James Bond film series (1983), Star Wars (2005) and the Harry Potter film series (2009) were awarded a "Goldene Leinwand mit Stern und Brillanten".

== Awards ==
=== Goldene Leinwand ===
Year	Films
1969	The Jungle Book
1970	The Love Bug
1973	The Aristocats
1976	Robin Hood
1978	Star Wars: A New Hope, The Rescuers
1979	Grease, Superman
1980	The Wild Geese
1981	Star Wars: The Empire Strikes Back
1982	The Fox and the Hound
1983	E.T. the Extra-Terrestrial
1984	Star Wars: Return of the Jedi
1985	Ghostbusters, Gremlins, Indiana Jones and the Temple of Doom
1986	Back to the Future
1989	Who Framed Roger Rabbit
1990	Back to the Future Part II, Indiana Jones and the Last Crusade
1991	Home Alone, The Little Mermaid
1992	The Rescuers Down Under
1993	Beauty and the Beast, Home Alone 2: Lost in New York, Jurassic Park
1994	Aladdin, Free Willy, The Lion King, Mrs. Doubtfire
1995	Casper
1996	Babe, Pocahontas
1997	The Hunchback of Notre Dame, Men in Black
1998	Hercules, Mulan
1999	A Bug's Life, The Mummy, Star Wars: Episode I – The Phantom Menace, Tarzan
2001	Shrek
2006	Ice Age: The Meltdown

=== Goldene Leinwand mit Stern ===
Year	Films
1994	Aladdin, The Lion King
1996	Babe
1997	Men in Black
2000	Star Wars: Episode I – The Phantom Menace
2012	The Intouchables, Ice Age 4: Continental Drift, Skyfall
2013	The Hobbit: An Unexpected Journey
2014	Fack ju Göhte, The Hobbit: The Desolation of Smaug
2015	Head Full of Honey, Minions, Fack ju Göhte 2, Spectre, Star Wars: The Force Awakens
2018	Fack ju Göhte 3

=== Goldene Leinwand mit Stern (Sonderversion) ===
Year	Films
1981	The Aristocats
1984	Once Upon a Time in the West, Papillon, From Here to Eternity, The Bridge on the River Kwai, The Twelve Tasks of Asterix
1988	The Jungle Book

=== Goldene Leinwand mit 2 Sternen ===
Year	Films
1994	Jurassic Park
1995	The Lion King
1996	Independence Day
1998	Titanic
2001	Der Schuh des Manitu, Harry Potter and the Philosopher's Stone
2002	The Lord of the Rings: The Fellowship of the Ring
2003	Harry Potter and the Chamber of Secrets, The Lord of the Rings: The Two Towers
2004	The Lord of the Rings: The Return of the King, Traumschiff Surprise – Periode 1
2010	Avatar
2012	The Intouchables
2015	Star Wars: The Force Awakens

=== Goldene Leinwand für besondere Verdienste ===
Year	People
1967	Walt Disney (posthumous)

== See also ==
- List of highest-grossing films in Germany
