= Jessika Cardinahl =

German actress, painter and sculptor

- Born: 1965 (age 60–61); Hamburg, West Germany
- Occupations: Actress; painter; sculptor
- Spouse: Al Corley (m. 1989; div. 1999)
- Children: 3

Jessika Cardinahl (born 1965) is a German actress, painter and sculptor.

== Biography ==
Cardinahl began her career as a model at the age of 16 at the Parkersed modeling agency. She came into contact with acting through film producer Horst Wendlandt. She was seen alongside Otto Waalkes in Otto - Der Film in 1985 and Otto - Der Liebesfilm in 1992. After playing small roles in US films and TV series (Northern Exposure, Chicago Hope) and shooting TV spots as a model for directors such as David Fincher or Joe Pytka, she has been working as a freelance painter and sculptor since 2002. In addition to various exhibitions in Los Angeles, New York City, Munich, Hamburg and Berlin, her works can be seen in the Children's Hospital in Los Angeles.

In the Summer of 2019, she and her partner Quentin Parker took part in the reality show Das Sommerhaus der Stars, where they were the first couple to voluntarily leave the house.

== Personal life ==
Cardinahl was married in 1989 to actor Al Corley (Dynasty), whom she met in 1984 and with whom she moved to the United States. Together they opened a restaurant in New York City. The two have three children together and separated in the late 1990s. Cardinahl is committed to promoting disabled children. She has been with the architect Quentin Dart Parker since 2001.
