= King of the Cloud Forests =

1987 British children's novel

- First edition cover
- Author: Michael Morpurgo
- Audio read by: Michael Morpurgo
- Language: English
- Genre: Fantasy; adventure; juvenile fiction
- Publisher: Heinemann
- Publication date: 1987
- Publication place: United Kingdom
- Media type: Print
- Pages: 146
- ISBN: 0-434-95201-X Hardback
- OCLC: 20428726

King of the Cloud Forests is a children's fantasy and adventure novel written by Michael Morpurgo. It was first published in the United Kingdom by Heinemann in 1987. It was released on audiobook in 2007, with Morpurgo providing the narration. It was shortlisted for a Carnegie Medal in 1987, and the novel was also adapted into a thirty-minute animated short in 2002.

== Plot ==
When the Japanese invade China in 1941, fourteen-year-old Ashley Anderson's father sends his son away with Uncle Sung, an old family friend from Tibet. Their intended destination is England, where Ashley's grandmother lives. In order to get there, they must travel through Tibet, Nepal, and India. Uncle Sung has to disguise Ashley though as a Tibetan boy, due to foreigners being suspect in the countries they are trekking through. When the disguise fails, they escape into the Himalaya mountains where they become stranded during a fierce blizzard. Their refuge is a small hut. When their food supply begins to rapidly diminish, Uncle Sung sets out to get help, leaving Ashley fighting for survival against hunger, snowstorms, and wolves. When Uncle Sung fails to return, Ashley is eventually rescued by the Yetis, and goes to live with them in their cave. After living with them for a while, it changes his outlook on life, and he is faced with making a difficult decision: remain with the Yeti, or head back out into the mountains to search for his Uncle, so he can continue on to England to live with his grandmother. He decides to leave and is reunited with Uncle Sung and learns that his father was killed during the invasion.

== Background ==
Morpurgo said he was inspired to write the novel, after reading an article written by an Austrian mountain climber who had triumphed over K2, the second-highest mountain on Earth after Mount Everest, and he had reported seeing a yeti during his journey.

== Release ==
The novel was first published in the United Kingdom by Heinemann in 1987, and it was shortlisted for a Carnegie Medal that same year. In December 2007, an audiobook was released (ISBN 978-1-4056-5574-3), featuring Morpurgo as the narrator. It included a four disc box-set that was produced by Chivers Children's Audio Books, with distribution handled by BBC Audiobooks.

== Adaption ==
In 2002, it was adapted into a thirty-minute animated short for television. The short was directed by Jean-Jacques Prunès, and it was co-produced by Les Films de l'Arlequin and France 3. The short was awarded an Artistic Prize at the Festival du Cinéma Nature & Environnement de Grenoble, a Best Television Special prize at the Auch Short Film Festival, and a Television Special Prize at the Annecy International Animation Film Festival. Additionally, the short was presented at the MIPCOM trade show for the television industry, held at the Palais des Festivals et des Congrès in Cannes, France.

== Reviews ==
I write my novels in longhand, sitting up in bed, just like Robert Louis Stevenson did.

— Michael Morpurgo

In her review for the School Library Journal, Mary Mueller said the novel is a "gentle fantasy in which the yeti seem very real and are portrayed as intelligent, kindly creatures. Most of the humans are somewhat one dimensional, but the action moves swiftly. Even though some events happen too neatly, Morpurgo ties up all the loose ends". The Emergency Librarian Magazine stated in their review, that what Morpurgo has written in this novel is "an imaginative, well-written adventure and fantasy story".

Ethel Twichell from Horn Book Magazine; Keith Barker from The Times Educational Supplement and Rita Padden from the Lassen County Times, all gave the book a favourable review, and the consensus amongst the three writers was "this novel is a good adventure for teenagers", and Padden also commented it "has an exotic setting and an unusual plot".

In an audiobook review, Susan Allison from Kliatt opined that "like the famous classics Peter Pan and The Secret Garden, this introduces characters that share with us life lessons, a commentary on the nature of life in the modern versus the natural world". She concluded by saying "Morpurgo's delivery not only draws us into the story, but also leaves us with much to think about". In another audiobook review, Kathy Miller from the School Library Journal called the novel an "unusual and engaging story". She also noted that Morpurgo who narrates the audiobook, has an "appealing voice and his British accent are perfect for this story told by Ashley". Overall, she recommended it for middle-grade students.

AudioFile Magazine wrote in their audiobook review that "Morpurgo delivers this charming and endearing tale in a British accent and steady pace. He masterfully manipulates the monosyllabic utterances of the yetis to illustrate the intention behind their often indiscernible words. Though he has a mature voice, he also executes Ashley's hopeful disposition well".

== See also ==
- List of works by Michael Morpurgo
- Yeti in popular culture
