= Schwarzbraun ist die Haselnuss =

18th-century German folk song

"Schwarzbraun ist die Haselnuss" (Auburn Is the Hazelnut) is a German folk song. It dates to 18th-century Franconia, although similar motifs are known since the 16th century. It was used as a marching song by German troops in all German armies since then.

The song remained popular in the post-war period. The most well-known version is by pop singer Heino, which appears on his 1971 album Schwer war der Abschied. The first verse of the song was performed by Otto Waalkes for the 1985 film Otto – Der Film, as an allusion to Michael Jackson's music video "Thriller". Erwin Halletz used the chorus in his song "Immer wenn ich traurig bin" for Heinz Erhardt in his role as Willi Hirsekorn in the 1970 comedy film That Can't Shake Our Willi!. It was also covered by the African-American vocal ensemble Golden Gate Quartet.

== Lyrics ==
Schwarzbraun ist die Haselnuss,
Schwarzbraun bin auch ich, ja, bin auch ich.
Schwarzbraun muss mein Mädel sein;
Gerade so wie ich!
Refrain:
𝄆 Holderi, juwijuwidi, ha ha ha,
Holderi, juwijuwidi. 𝄇

Mädel hat mir Busserl geb'n,
Hat mich schwer gekränkt, ja, schwer gekränkt.
Hab ich's ihr gleich wiedergeb'n;
Ich nehm ja nichts geschenkt!
Refrain

Mädel hat nicht Hof noch Haus,
Mädel hat kein Geld, ja, hat kein Geld.
Doch ich geb sie nicht heraus;
Für alles in der Welt!
Refrain

Schwarzbraun ist die Haselnuss,
Schwarzbraun bin auch ich, ja, bin auch ich.
wenn i eine heirat'n tu,
so muß sie sein wie du.
Refrain

Auburn is the hazel nut,
auburn am I too, yes I am,
auburn must my true love be,
exactly just like me!
Refrain

My sweetheart came and gave me a kiss,
which greatly offended me, yes offended,
I swiftly gave it back to her,
I don't accept gifts.
Refrain

Sweetheart has no home, no hearth,
sweetheart has no gold, yes no gold.
But I'd never give her up
for all that's in the world!
Refrain

Auburn is the hazel nut,
Auburn am I too, yes am I too.
If I should marry a girl
she must be like you!
Refrain

== In popular culture ==
The song appears on the soundtrack of Hearts of Iron IV, a grand strategy game set before and during World War II. It also appears about 30 minutes into the 1974 film The Odessa File, where it is sung at the reunion of the Siegfried Division.
