= Die Geschichte vom kleinen Muck =

Die Geschichte von dem kleinen Muck
- Directed by: Wolfgang Staudte
- Written by: Peter Podehl (screenplay); Wilhelm Hauff (fairy tale)
- Starring: Thomas Schmidt; Johannes Maus; Alwin Lippisch
- Distributed by: Deutsche Film AG (DEFA)
- Release date: 23 December 1953 (East Germany)
- Running time: 100 minutes
- Country: East Germany
- Box office: 13 million admissions (East Germany)

Die Geschichte vom Kleinen Muck (English: The Story of Little Muck) is a 1953 feature film directed by Wolfgang Staudte, adapted from the 19th century fairy tale, Little Muck, written by Wilhelm Hauff. It was the most successful film in East Germany.

== Plot ==
An old artisan in a Middle Eastern town finds himself the brunt of abuse from the townspeople, due to his hunch-back. The children, who call him wicked, chase him and corner him in his shop. He locks them in and tells them they can only leave once they have listened to his story. It turns out the old man used to be called Little Muck in his youth. As a boy, Muck is kind and benevolent, despite being discriminated against by everyone.

When his caring father dies, his greedy relatives ransack his house and threaten Muck. Muck escapes and sets out in search of a merchant who can supposedly sell happiness. He wanders across the desert, only to find the house of a wicked woman who traps him. Before escaping he takes her magical boots and staff. These boots allow Muck to run faster than anyone else in the land.

He immediately seeks out the Sultan, and with the help of his boots, he becomes the Sultan's chief runner, delivering messages. His staff also has the power to find buried treasures. His employment with the Sultan leads to the youth encountering some ethical problems. Eventually, he is framed for thievery and thrown out. Despite these circumstances, Muck returns and helps his virtuous friend, Hassan, win the heart of the lovely Princess Amarza.

Once Muck has finished his retrospective, the children display a newfound respect for him, and they help him with his work.

== Themes ==
There are several morals to be found in the film. The film's main antagonists are agents of greed and occasionally senseless violence, such as the Sultan when he declares war on a neighbouring state for no other reason than the planet's orbit. The sultan exclaims: "You have the audacity to tell me that the sun comes up earlier in the neighboring country of sultan Wasil Husain than in mine?" The Sultan also lives a life of excessive luxury, and is largely apathetic to the misfortunes of others. He once claims "I counted the slaves in the bath today. There were only 31! I'm not going to have to dry myself, am I?"

Muck's relatives are also excessively greedy and disrespectful to Muck's father. The moment the old man dies, these relatives show up and threaten an obviously traumatized Muck.

Conversely, Muck remains generous and kind throughout the movie. He feels sympathy for the runner he puts out of work, he frees a slave girl, and he even defies the Sultan's orders by disregarding the declaration of war he was supposed to deliver.

Despite these exploits, he is still a social pariah, up until he shares his story with everyone else. These instances of social commentary are fairly subtle throughout, and the film remains light-hearted and whimsical.

== Reception ==
From the movie's release in 1953 to the fall of the GDR in East Germany, Kleiner Muck remained the number one selling film of the Ministry of Foreign Trade. It attracted 12,998,153 viewers in the country alone.

Director Wolfgang Staudte was originally slotted to work on the film Mutter Courage und ihre Kinder, but due to disagreements, he never started work on the project and took up Kleiner Muck as an interim project.

== Filmic techniques and diegesis ==
The film's fictional world is whimsical and fanciful. The colours of the sets are bright throughout the film, with the exception of a brief dungeon scene. Most of the camera-work is done at close range, and there are very few panoramas in the film. The background sets are often intentionally exaggerated. Ideal middle-eastern towns border with sand dunes and lush palaces in an escapist representation of the Orient.

The costumes and make-up are equally exaggerated, probably due to the film not taking itself too seriously. The cast is for the most part German, and these German actors are tasked with portraying Arabs. The make-up is fairly obvious, while the hair-styles and clothes donned by the film's antagonists are meant to be sources of light ridicule. Special effects are also used, specifically with regards to the story's magical elements. Muck's incredible speed is shown as he runs in fast-forward. His staff hovers, and donkeys' ears grow out of heads.

Despite the film's production in a totalitarian state, the film does not contain any obvious propaganda or political messages. The dialogue and events of the diegesis remain apolitical throughout.
