= Rettet die Weihnachtsgans =

2006 film

- Genre: Family
- Created by: Tobias Stille
- Developed by: Goldkind Filmproduktion
- Directed by: Jörg Grünler
- Composer: Stephan Massimo
- Country of origin: Germany
- Original language: German

Production
- Executive producer: Jochen Ketschau
- Producer: Sven Burgemeister .... producer
- Cinematography: Hans Grimmelmann
- Editor: Andreas Herzog

Original release
- Release: 12 December 2006

Rettet die Weihnachtsgans (English: Saving the Christmas Goose) is a 2006 German family television film. It was first broadcast on 12 December 2006.

== Cast ==
- Markus Krojer as Rudi Wasmeier
- Leslie-Vanessa Lill as Sophia Helfer
- Christian Tramitz as Heinrich Helfer
- Katharina Müller-Elmau as Monika Helfer
- Gesine Cukrowski as Nina
- Götz Otto as Alfred
- Franziska Schlattner as Hanna Wasmeier
- August Schmölzer as Xaver Wasmeier
- Monika Baumgartner as Käthe
- Kevin Iannotta as Peter
- Norbert Heckner
- Alexander Onken
- Martin Walch
- Hans-Jürgen Stockerl
