= Reclaim Your Brain =

Reclaim your Brain
- Directed by: Hans Weingartner
- Written by: Katharina Held; Hans Weingartner
- Produced by: Barbara Albert; Martin Gschlacht; Jessica Hausner; Antonin Svoboda; Hans Weingartner
- Starring: Moritz Bleibtreu; Elsa Sophie Gambard; Milan Peschel
- Cinematography: Christine A. Maier
- Edited by: Andreas Wodraschke
- Music by: Adem Ilhan; Andreas Wodraschke
- Production companies: Coop99 Filmproduktion; Kahuuna Films; Österreichischer Rundfunk
- Release dates: 11 September 2007 (TIFF); 15 November 2007 (Germany)
- Running time: 130 minutes
- Country: Germany
- Language: German

Reclaim Your Brain (German: Free Rainer – Dein Fernseher lügt) is a 2007 German film directed by Hans Weingartner. The film stars Moritz Bleibtreu as Reiner, a television producer who has become rich and successful off trashy television programming; one day, however, Pegah (Elsa Sophie Gambard) crashes her car into his as revenge for her grandfather committing suicide as a result of one of his shows, leading him on a crusade to make more intelligent programming and uncover a vast conspiracy in the broadcast industry to keep the quality level of television shows low.

== Cast ==
- Moritz Bleibtreu - Rainer
- Elsa Sophie Gambard - Pegah
- Milan Peschel - Phillip
- Gregor Bloéb - Maiwald
- Tom Jahn - Bernd
- Irshad Panjatan - Gopal
