= Mord ist mein Geschäft, Liebling =

- Theatrical release poster
- Directed by: Sebastian Niemann
- Written by: Dirk Ahner; Sebastian Niemann
- Produced by: Christian Becker
- Starring: Rick Kavanian; Nora Tschirner; Christian Tramitz; Bud Spencer; Franco Nero
- Cinematography: Gerhard Schirlo
- Edited by: Moune Barius
- Music by: Egon Riedel
- Production companies: Rat Pack Filmproduktion; Warner Bros. Film Productions Germany; B.A. Filmproduktion; Babelsberg Film; Beta Film; Erfttal Film; Studio Babelsberg
- Distributed by: Warner Bros. Pictures
- Release date: 26 February 2009 (Germany)
- Running time: 107 minutes
- Country: Germany
- Language: German
- Box office: $3,866,555

Mord ist mein Geschäft, Liebling (Killing Is My Business, Honey) is a 2009 German screwball comedy film directed by Sebastian Niemann. The film stars Rick Kavanian, Nora Tschirner, Christian Tramitz, Bud Spencer and Franco Nero, and it follows a suave, but lonely german hitman who assumes the identity of an author he recently assassinated to pursue a romantic relationship with the writer's editor. It is the last film to feature Spencer before his death in 2016.

== Plot ==
Enrico Puzzo (Franco Nero) is an eccentric Italian author who claims he knows the Mafia from inside. Based on these allegations he wrote a book and sold it under a pen name to a German publishing house. Puzzo lives in an expensive hotel, where he doesn't hesitate to threaten employees with his pistol in case something isn't to his liking. He also consumes a great deal of cocaine, sometimes even at broad daylight on the balcony of his hotel suite. As crazy as he is, he writes on a typewriter and sends a unique typescript to his publisher who is already about to have a huge press conference on this book. That is when Toni Ricardelli (Rick Kavanian), a German-born hitman of suave behaviour, comes into play. He intercepts the script just in time, leaving the publisher Christopher Kimbel (Hans-Michael Rehberg) empty-handed. Not the mafia, but the publisher is embarrassed.

Editor Julia Steffens (Nora Tschirner) loses her job because of this fiasco. But she is encouraged by her fiancé, Christoper Kimbel's son Bob (Janek Rieke) to try redeem herself. To do so she travels to Italy for she wants to persuade Enrico Puzzo to write it all again. Before she gets to him, Toni Ricardelli does. She nearly catches Toni in the act of killing Puzzo. Yet Toni is enchanted by her innocent charm and her cute clumsiness. Julia thinks he was Puzzo and he eventually indulges her because he is in love and just wants to be with her by all means.

She takes Ricardelli to Germany, where he asks his blind uncle Pepe (Bud Spencer) to make up some stories and to have them written down by a restaurant owner. But now mafia boss Salvatore Marino (Günther Kaufmann) also believes Ricardelli was the unknown author and wants to have him killed. Trying to achieve that he hires a bunch of killers including Ricardelli's old rival Helmut Münchinger (Christian Tramitz). Fortunately Münchinger is always distracted by phone calls of his beloved wife on his mobile phone. In the end Bob Kimbel marries his secretary Lisa (Jasmin Schwiers) and Toni Ricardelli lives to marry Julia Steffens.

== Cast ==
- Rick Kavanian as Toni Ricardelli
- Nora Tschirner as Julia Steffens
- Janek Rieke as Bob Kimbel
- Hans-Michael Rehberg as Christopher Kimbel
- Christian Tramitz as Helmut Münchinger
- Ludger Pistor as Dr. Gruber
- Günther Kaufmann as Salvatore Marino
- Bud Spencer as Pepe
- Jasmin Schwiers as Lisa
- Franco Nero as Enrico Puzzo
- Wolfgang Völz as Henry von Göttler
- Axel Stein as Dirk
- Chi Le as Maria
- Nela Panghy-Lee as Mercedes
- Wolf Roth: Paolo Rossi
- Oscar Ortega Sánchez as Garcia 'El Toro'
- Doris Kunstmann as Frau Eisenstein

== See also ==
- Code Name: The Cleaner
