= Bullyparade =

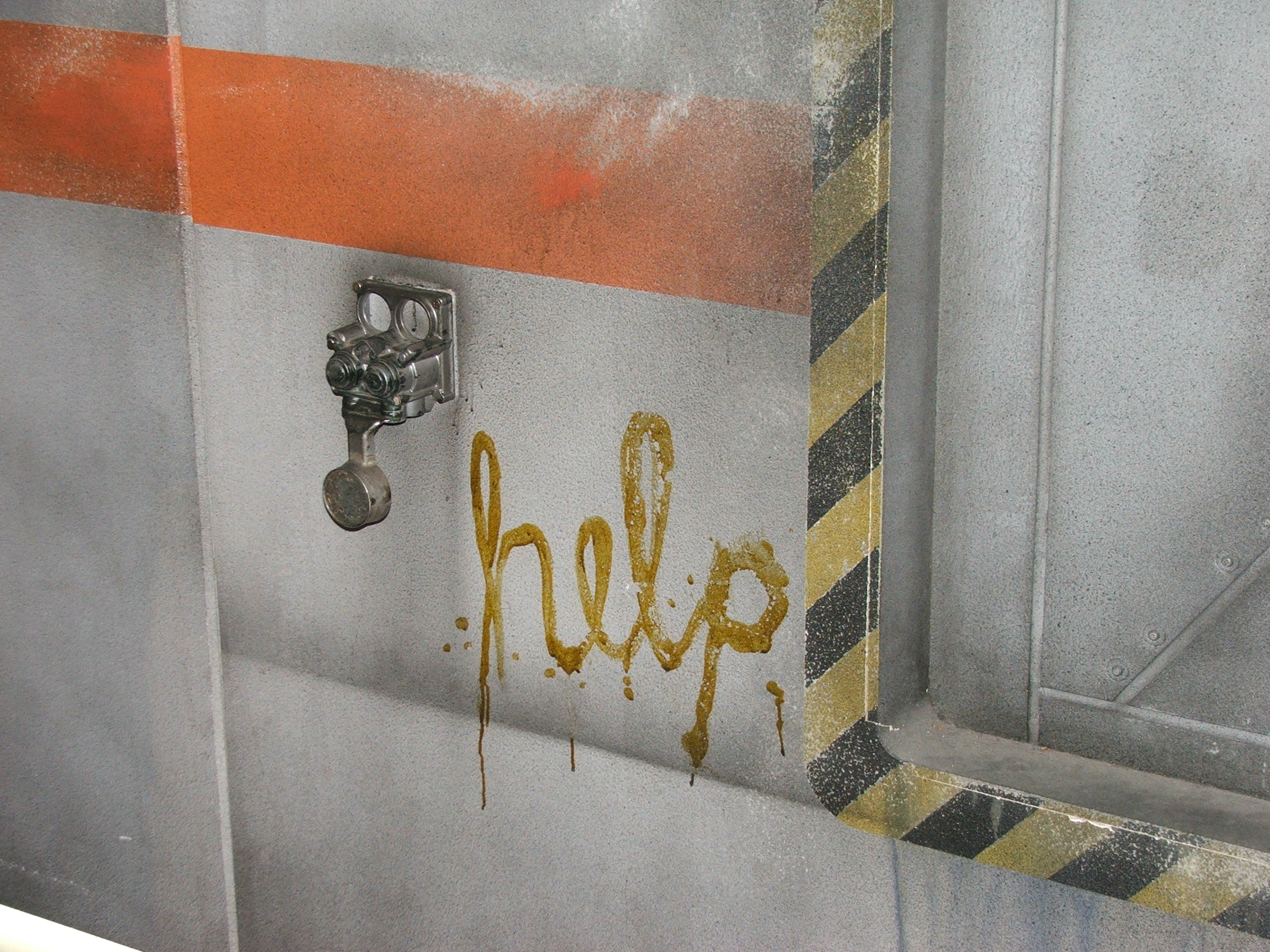
- Genre: Sketch comedy Surreal comedy Satire; Black comedy
- Created by: Michael "Bully" Herbig
- Written by: Michael "Bully" Herbig; Christian Tramitz; Rick Kavanian
- Directed by: Michael "Bully" Herbig
- Starring: Michael "Bully" Herbig; Christian Tramitz; Rick Kavanian; Diana Herold
- Opening theme: "Hollywood Follies"
- Composer: Ray Davies
- Country of origin: Germany
- No. of series: 6
- No. of episodes: 90

Production
- Running time: 25 minutes

Original release
- Network: ProSieben
- Release: 24 May 1997 – 5 December 2002

Related
- Der Schuh des Manitu (T)Raumschiff Surprise - Periode 1 Lissi und der wilde Kaiser; Bully & Rick; Tramitz and Friends

Bullyparade was a German late night comedy sketch show which aired from 1997 to 2002 on German channel ProSieben. Michael Herbig, Rick Kavanian and Christian Tramitz were the main cast of the show. Herbig also directed, produced and mainly developed the show, while all three comedians wrote the sketches and characters.

== History and concept ==
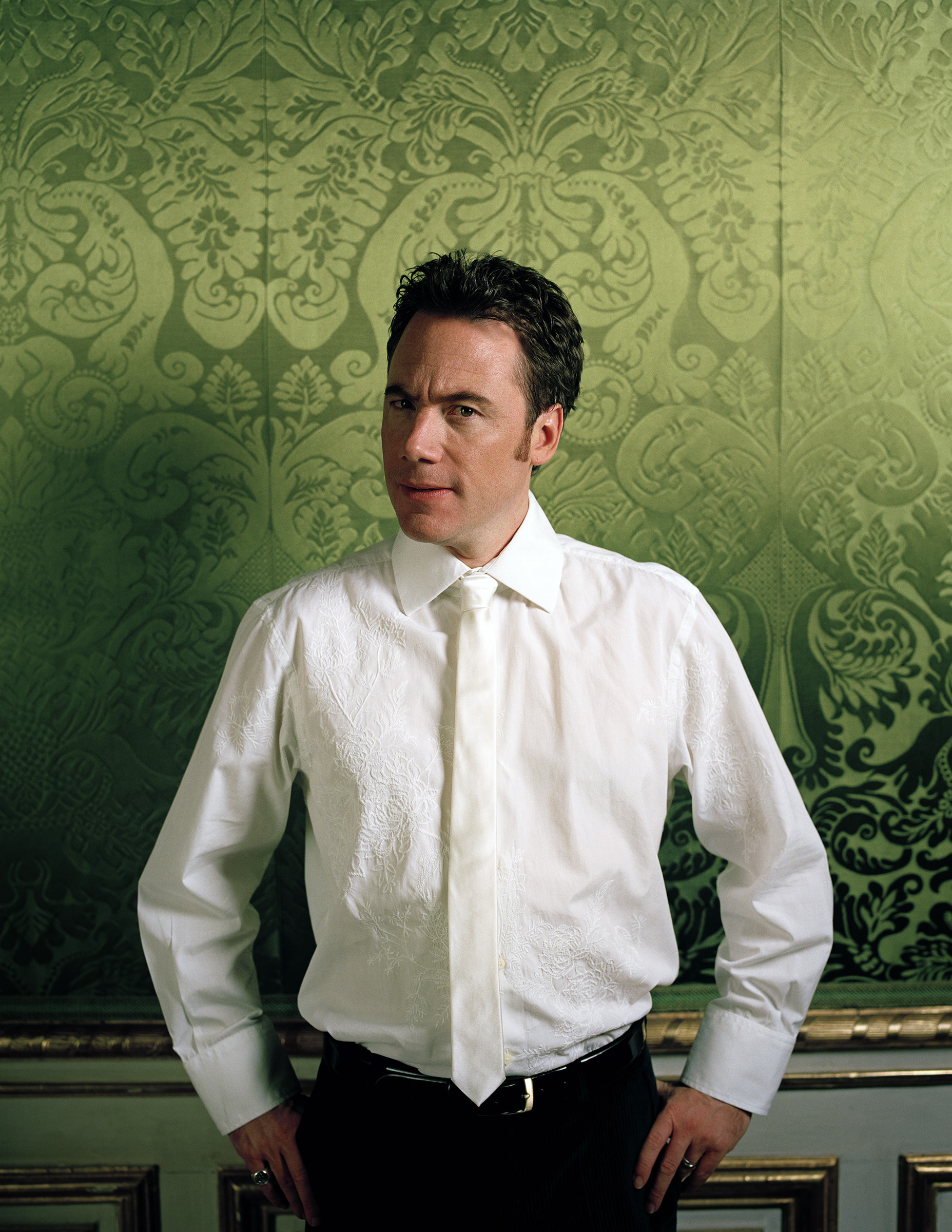
Michael "Bully" Herbig (2007)

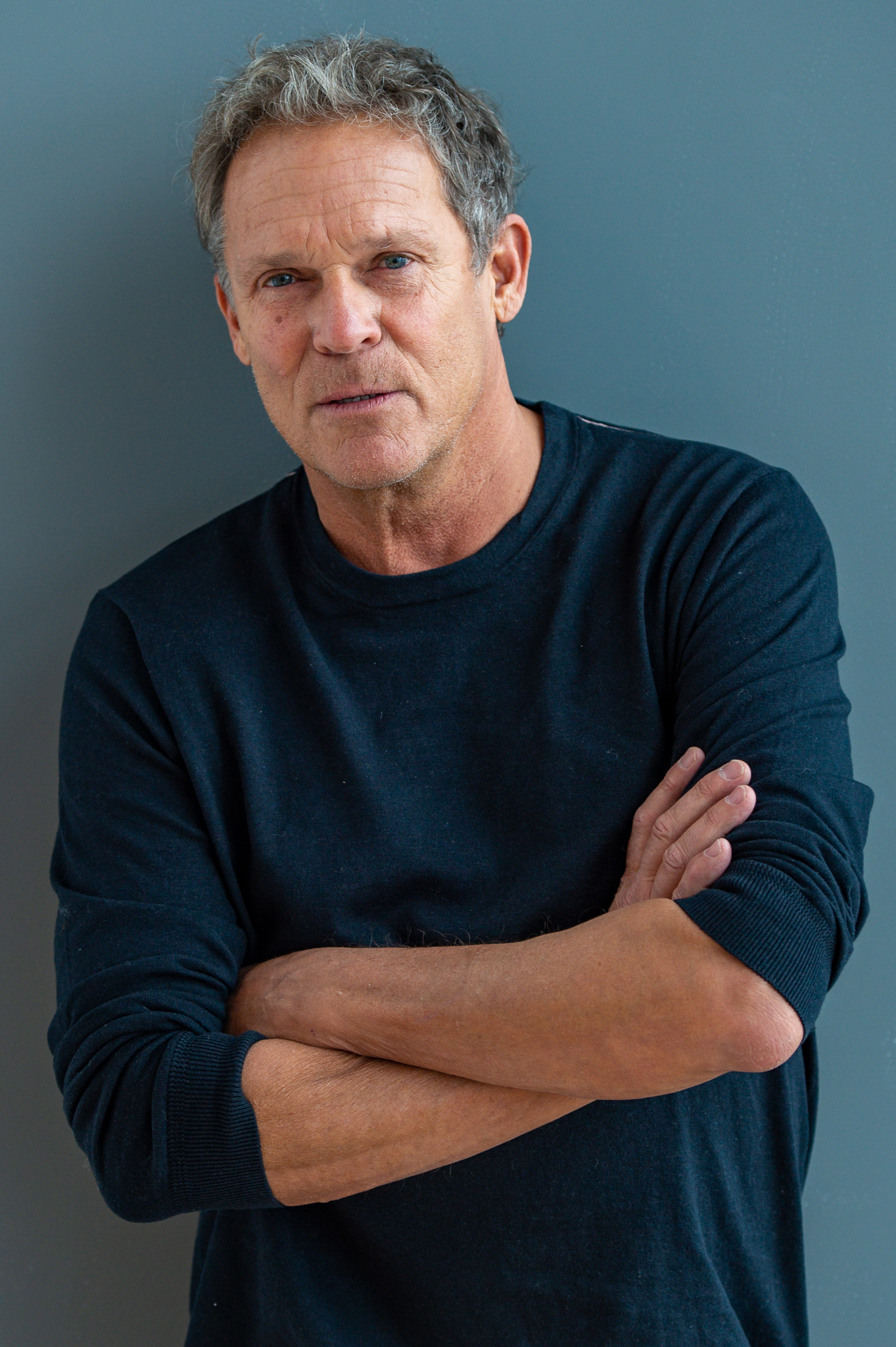
Christian Tramitz (2019)

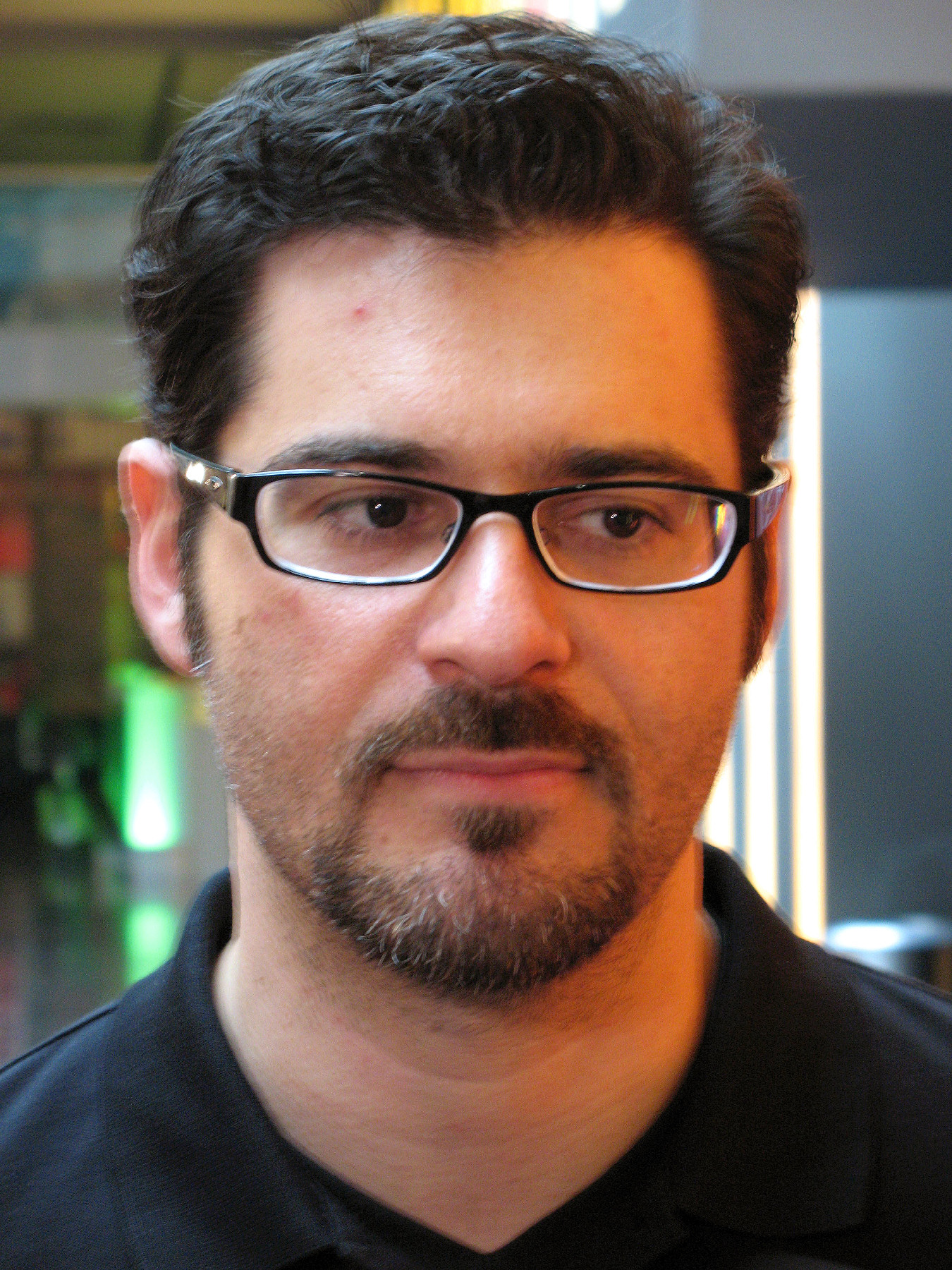
Rick Kavanian (2007)

The weekly show featured both taped and live performed sketches. Most sketches were part of a series of sketches featuring special characters and settings. The show had a high rate of running gags, and depictions of daily news, international pop culture parodies as well as European and German public figures. While Michael Herbig acted as host, director and producer, all three comedians wrote the sketches, developed the characters and acted in a wide variety roles. With rising success the show was aired with a studio band in front of a live audience.

In Germany, Bullyparade gained strong cult followings even long time after it had been canceled; its status and popularity can be compared to Monty Python's Flying Circus in the UK. One thing it had in common with the Flying Circus was the frequent use of drag by the main cast.

Due to the regional origin and the background of its creators, Bullyparade is strongly associated with Southern German humor. The dialects and accents used on the show are depicting cultural peculiarities from many different regions all over Germany, Austria, South Tyrol, and Switzerland.

== Cast ==
- Michael Herbig, (born 29 April 1968) is a German comedian, actor and filmmaker. His nickname "Bully" (in German commonly associated with the VW Bully, rather than the English term) became part of his stage name as a comedian. He directed, produced and co-wrote all sketches. His characters and parodies on Bullyparade include Bully, Franz Beckenbauer, Winnetou, Sissi, Mr. Spuck (based on Spock), Jesus, Mrs. Schnürrlein, and Heidi.
- Christian Tramitz (born 29 July 1955) is a German-Austrian actor, voice actor, musician, and comedian. His characters and parodies on Bullyparade include Emperor Franz Joseph I of Austria, Reinhold Messner, Toni Polster, Old Shatterhand, Captain Kork (based on James T. Kirk), Peter Lustig, Bernd Bond (based on James Bond), and Arnold Schwarzenegger as The Terminator.
- Rick Kavanian (Richard Horatio Kavanian), born 26 January 1971, in Munich, is a German actor, comedian, author and voice actor of Armenian descent. Wearing his glasses for all roles regardless of historical periods or circumstances became his signature look on the show. Some of his characters include the Yeti, a variety of minor Star Trek characters, Jürgen Klinsmann, Greek TV presenter and bandit Dimitri, Batman, many female characters and due to his fluent English, some English-speaking characters.

Released in 2001, the movie Der Schuh des Manitu, also directed by Herbig and written by the trio, is a parody of Spaghetti Westerns and the successful 1960s film adaptations of the Winnetou books written by Karl May. It's based on the show's successful Winnetou sketches, featuring all three comedians in various characters. The movie became the highest-grossing German movie on the domestic market of all time.

In 2004, Michael Herbig produced a second movie, (T)Raumschiff Surprise - Periode 1, which was also based on sketches parodying sci-fi shows like Star Trek and also had great success, becoming the second highest-grossing German movie on the domestic market (as of 2026, it remains the 6th highest-grossing German film). Some characters and sides from the first movie are revisited, or shown from a different perspective. The movie also parodies elements from Star Wars, time travel movies, The X-Files and many other franchises.

A third movie titled Lissi und der wilde Kaiser (2007) was based on the Bullyparade sketch series "Wechseljahre einer Kaiserin" (Menopause of an Empress) was released in 2007. It's based on the Austrian Sissi films starring Romy Schneider, depicting a cheesy version of the in real life tragic life story of Sissi. While Herbig and Tramitz dressed up as the royal couple for the sketches, they are just voicing animated characters in the movie.

In 2017, on the occasion of the show's 20th anniversary, the fourth movie Bullyparade - The Movie was released, featuring different shorelines following the most popular characters from the show and the previous movies. It also shows a variety of new characters never shown before, such as Dr. Schmitz, based on Christoph Waltz' character Dr. King Schultz from Django Unchained.

In 2025, Herbig directed and produced a fifth movie, Das Kanu des Manitu, which is a sequel to Der Schuh des Manitu. Set several years after its predecessor, it follows the main characters from the first film, as well as the new character Mary, as they fight a ruthless gang that searches for a legendary canoe. The film became the most successful German movie on the domestic market of the year 2025 and the most successful German movie since the COVID-19 pandemic.

While Herbig, Tramitz and Kavanian play the many different main characters in the movies, the cast is expanded by other actors playing similar/recurring roles over the course of all four movies. These are mainly Sky du Mont playing villains (Western bandit leader "Santa Maria", US Army General Motors, Duke William the Last), Til Schweiger (Rock Finished-Over, a Space Taxidriver turned Knight), Irshad Panjatan playing apparent villains turned out to be harmless, comedian Anke Engelke angry female relatives to the main cast and famous German actresses Anja Kling, Marie Bäumer and Jasmin Schwiers as strong and independent female leads.

== Recurring characters and sketches (selection) ==
- Unser (T)Raumschiff (Our Dream/Spaceship)
  Based on Star Trek (with Tramitz as "Kork" (sounds like "Cock" in the characters' dialect); Herbig as "Mr. Spuck" ("Spit") and Kavanian as Bones, "Schrotty" ("Junk") and "Solo"), the depiction of the characters is stereotypically gay. The sketches also depict aspects of Star Wars and German soap Das Traumschiff.
- Winnetou MXXXIV
  parody of the German Winnetou movie franchise based on the novels by Karl May (with Tramitz as Old Shatterhand and Herbig as Winnetou), depicting stereotypical aspects of spaghetti Westerns, all characters speaking in strong South Bavarian dialects.
- Sissi - Wechseljahre einer Kaiserin (Sissi - Menopause of an Empress)
  Parody of (the Sissi film trilogy starring Romy Schneider, with Tramitz as Emperor Franz, Herbig as Sissi and Kavanian as Field Marshal.
- The Terminator
  Tramitz parodies Schwarzenegger's role.
- James Bond
  Tramitz as "Bernd Bond" and Herbig as Q.
- Pavel and Bronko
  A made up Czech talk show.
- Latrine - die Soap auf dem Klo
  Soap opera where three guys live next to each other in compartments of a public restroom.
- Yeti am Mittag (Yeti at noon)
  Talkshow hosted by the Yeti (Kavanian), featuring different guests, mostly Reinhold Messner (Herbig).
- Ronny, Lutz und Löffler
  are three alternative permanent students
- Christian und Daniel – Piloten aus Leidenschaft (Passionate Pilots)
  Tramitz and Herbig depicting the glamorous cockpit lives of two Boeing 747 pilots.
- Heidi
  Based on Swiss children's novel character Heidi (Herbig), an orphaned girl living with her grandfather (Tramitz) and showing interest in everyday life questions and Ziegenpeter (Kavanian).
- Kasirske Brothers
  Presentations by DDR-nostalgic brothers Jens and Jörg Kasirske from Dresden.

== Guest appearances ==
Over time and with its raise in popularity the show featured prominent guests such as DJ BoBo, Olli Dittrich, Anke Engelke, Erkan und Stefan, Herbert Feuerstein, Sky du Mont, DJ Ötzi, Bastian Pastewka, Stefan Raab and Sasha.
