= Michael "Bully" Herbig =

German comedian and actor (born 1968)

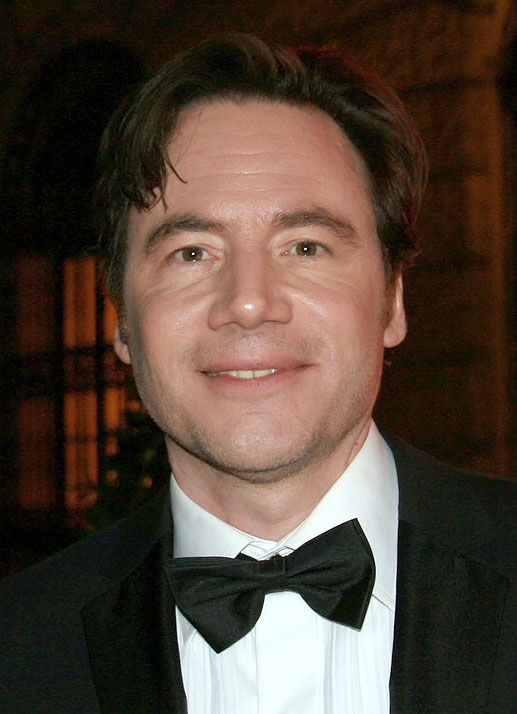
- Herbig in 2012
- Born: Michael Herbig; 29 April 1968 (age 58); Munich, West Germany
- Occupations: Comedian; actor; filmmaker; businessman
- Years active: 1992–present
- Spouse: Daniela (m. 2003)
- Children: 1

Michael Herbig (born 29 April 1968), nicknamed Bully, is a German comedian and actor.

== Career ==
His career began in 1992 with regular appearances on radio (more than 800), leading to appearances on various television shows. He gained wider fame as writer, actor and director of the comedy show Bullyparade. The sketch show featured him as the host, his good friend Rick Kavanian, Christian Tramitz, and Diana Herold as a dancer and occasional actress in the skits. The show featured many different themes, including stereotypical gay archetypes in a Star Trek parody, an homage to westerns, and of the Austrian empress Elisabeth of Bavaria, informally known as Sissi. On the show, he let the audience vote which theme to use for each of his movies based upon characters from the show. The first, the 2001 Der Schuh des Manitu ("Manitou's Shoe") was seen by over 11.7 million people, one of the most successful German films to date. His second film, (T)Raumschiff Surprise – Periode 1 (2004) was also a commercial success, cementing his career.

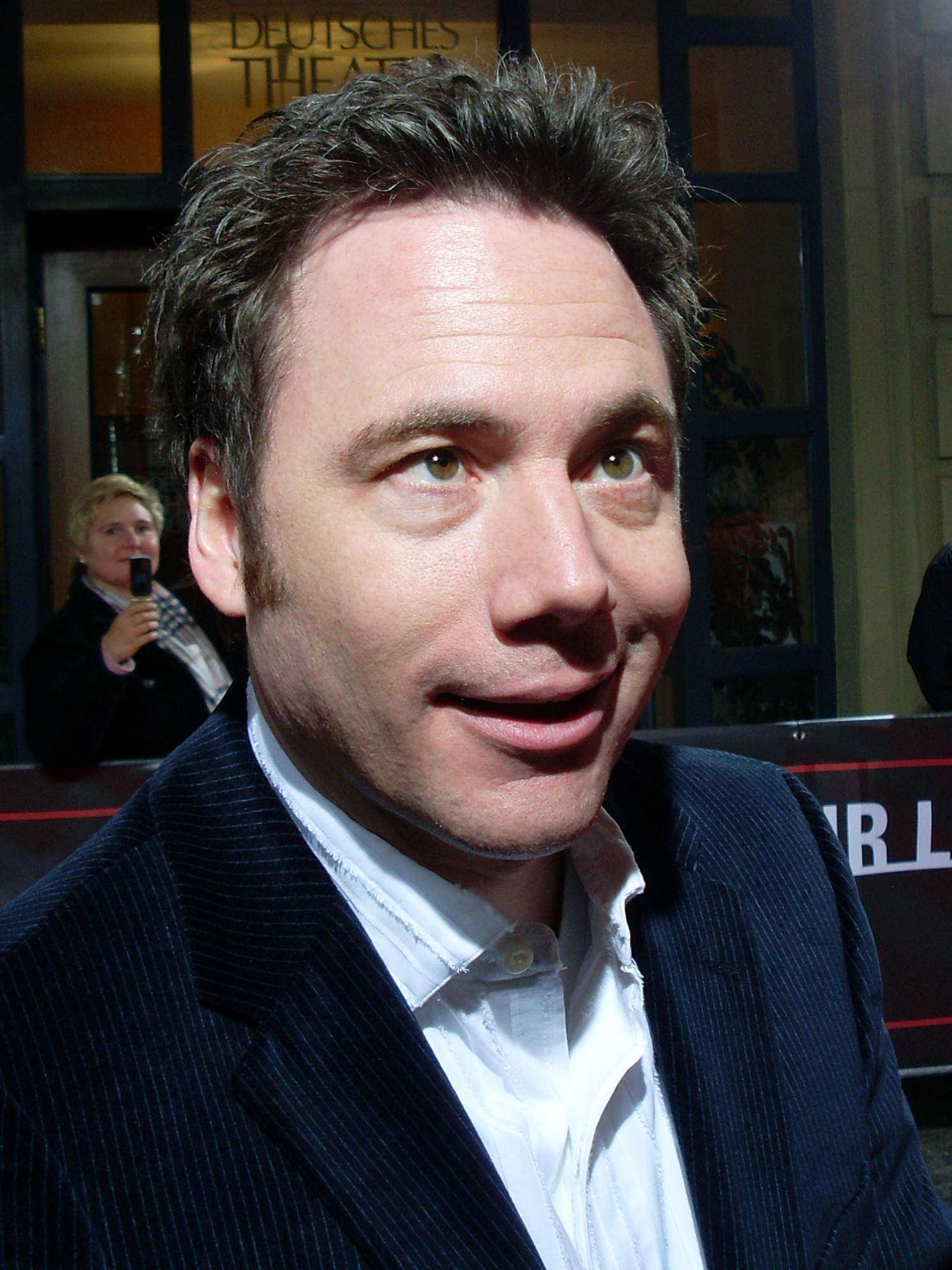
Herbig making a silly face, 2008

In January 2008, Variety reported that Herbig was set to film a live-action adaptation of animated series Vicky the Viking. The film, carrying the same name as the animated series, was released in 2009.

In 2018, the film Balloon was released, in which he had written, directed, and produced. It was his first dramatic directorial work. The movie depicted the balloon escape of the Strelzyk and Wetzel families, from East to West Germany in 1979.

Herbig voiced Sheriff Woody in the German dubs of Toy Story 3 and 4, after the character's former German dubber Peer Augustinski had a stroke in 2005 and died in 2014.

Since April 2021, Herbig has hosted Last One Laughing: Germany on Amazon Prime.

== Awards ==
- 2001 Bavarian Film Awards (Special Prize)

== Filmography ==
Year	Title	Notes
1997	Easy Bully (TV)	Director, producer, writer and starring
1997–2002	Bullyparade (TV series)	Director, producer, writer and starring
1999	Die Bademeister (TV film)	Starring
2000	Erkan & Stefan	Director
2001	Manitou's Shoe	Director, producer, writer and starring
2001	The Emperor's New Groove	German voice of Kuzco
2002	More Ants in the Pants	Supporting
2004–2007	Bully & Rick (TV series)	Director, producer, writer and starring
2004	Boo, Zino & the Snurks	Voice of Buu
2004	(T)Rraumschiff Surprise – Periode 1	Director, producer, writer and starring
2005	Robots	German voice of Fender
2006	Hui Buh: The Goofy Ghost	Voice and model for the CGI main character
2007	Lissi and the Wild Emperor	Writer, director and starring
2008	Asterix at the Olympic Games	Supporting
2008	Bully sucht die starken Männer! (TV)	Judge in casting show for the movie "Vicky [...]"
2008	The Legend of Brandner Kaspar	Starring
2009	Vicky the Viking	Director and starring
2010	Toy Story 3	German voice of Woody
2011	Hotel Lux	Starring
2012	Zettl	Starring
2013	The Incredible Burt Wonderstone	Supporting
2013	Buddy	Director, producer, writer and starring
2016	Vier gegen die Bank	Starring
2017	Bullyparade – The Movie	Director, producer, writer and starring
2018	Tabaluga	Starring
2018	Balloon	Director
2019	Toy Story 4	German voice of Woody
2020	Der Boandlkramer und die ewige Liebe	Starring
2022	A Thousand Lines	Director
2022	Hui Buh und das Hexenschloss	Voice of Hui Buh
2025	Manitou's Canoe	Director, producer, writer and starring
