= Sky du Mont =

German actor

- Du Mont in 2025
- Born: Marco Claudio Cayetano Bremme Neven du Mont; 20 May 1947 (age 79); Buenos Aires, Argentina
- Other name: Sky DuMont
- Spouses: Helga Lehner (m. 1972, divorced); Diane Stolojan (m. 1992; div. 1995); Cosima von Borsody (m. 1995; div. 2000); Mirja du Mont (m. 2000; div. 2016)
- Children: 3
- Website: www.skydumont.de

Marco Claudio "Cayetano" Bremme Neven du Mont (Spanish: [kaʝeˈtano ˈneβen du ˈmon]; born 20 May 1947) colloquially Sky du Mont is an Argentine-born German actor, voice actor and author.

== Early life ==
Du Mont was born 20 May 1947 in Buenos Aires, Argentina, one of two children, to Klaus Christian Bremme (1921–2013), a publisher, and English-born Chiquita Neven du Mont (1921–2018), into the affluent DuMont Schauberg family. He had an older brother, Christian Bremme (1943–2023), who gave him the nick name "Sky".

His parents divorced when he was only four years old and his mother returned to Europe in 1952. Du Mont was subsequently raised in England and completed his Matura in Switzerland. Du Mont had a brief and early career as an estate agent in London, which came to an abrupt end after his work permit was not renewed.

He ultimately permanently settled in Munich, Germany, where he attended acting school from 1969 to 1972.

== Career ==
In Germany, he is well known for playing suave and urbane, sometimes villainous or shady upper class characters since the 1970s. He appeared in three of the commercially most successful German film comedies of all time: In Otto – Der Film (1985) as an aristrocratic-looking swindler, as the villain "Santa Maria" in the Western comedy Der Schuh des Manitu (2001) and in Traumschiff Surprise – Periode 1 (2003), where he reprised his role as "Santa Maria" and played a second role as "William der Letzte" (William the Last), an English duke in the Middle Ages.

In international cinema, Sky du Mont portrayed the Hungarian businessman Sandor Szavost in Stanley Kubrick's Eyes Wide Shut (1999) and played one of the Nazi killers in The Boys from Brazil (1978). Other international roles include Count Galeazzo Ciano in the US-miniseries The Winds of War (1983), Claus von Stauffenberg in the sequel War and Remembrance (1989), and a recurring role in the soap opera General Hospital in the 1980s. Du Mont also made an uncredited appearance in Das Boot as the officer aboard the resupply ship Weser to whom the U-96 second watch officer demonstrates depth-charging. While he only appears in the background in the theatrical and director's cut, his full appearance is featured in the uncut mini-series.

Du Mont also serves as the German narrator of the children's series Thomas & Friends. He is also known for his voiceover work for commercials. After filming Das Kanu des Manitu, he announced his retirement of acting.

== Personal life ==
Sky du Mont lives in Hamburg and has been married four times. In 2016, he separated from his wife Mirja Du Mont, who is also the mother of two of his three children, Tara Neven du Mont and Fayn Neven du Mont. His third and oldest son is named Clemens Neven du Mont.

He was a member of the Free Democratic Party and supported them in campaigns, but left them in early 2018.

== Selected filmography ==
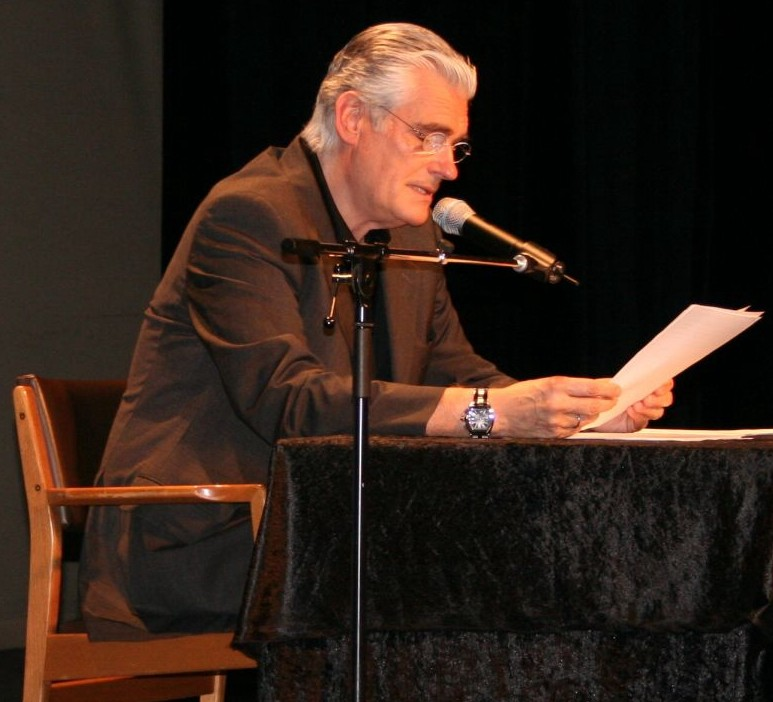
Sky du Mont reading Confessions of Felix Krull in 2005

Films and Miniseries

- 1976: Silence in the Forest
- 1978: The Boys From Brazil (credited as "Guy Dumont")
- 1979: Avalanche Express
- 1979: Goetz von Berlichingen of the Iron Hand
- 1981: Lion of the Desert
- 1982: Night Crossing
- 1982: Inside the Third Reich (TV miniseries)
- 1983: The Winds of War (TV miniseries)
- 1983: Deep Water (TV film)
- 1985: Otto – Der Film
- 1986: Love with the Perfect Stranger
- 1986: Franza
- 1988-1989: War and Remembrance (TV miniseries)
- 1992: Judith Krantz's Secrets (TV miniseries)
- 1999: Eyes Wide Shut, as Sandor Szavost
- 2000: Manila
- 2001: Der Schuh des Manitu
- 2004: Traumschiff Surprise – Periode 1
- 2011: Stankowski's Millions (TV film)
- 2012: The Marriage Swindler and His Wife (TV film)
- 2014: Die Schlikkerfrauen (TV film)
- 2017: Bullyparade – Der Film
- 2025: Das Kanu des Manitu

Television Series

- 1976: Derrick - Season 3, Episode 2: "Tod des Trompeters"
- 1978: Derrick - Season 5, Episode 6: "Klavierkonzert"
- 1980: Derrick - Season 7, Episode 6: "Die Entscheidung"
- 1982: Derrick - Season 9, Episode 7: "Hausmusik"
- 1984: Derrick - Season 11, Episode 4: "Drei atemlose Tage"
- 1984: Scarecrow and Mrs. King - Season 2, Episode 2: "The Times They Are a Changin"
- 1985: Derrick - Season 12, Episode 1: "Der Mann aus Antibes"
- 1986: Derrick - "Der Augenzeuge"
- 1988: Derrick - "Die Stimme"
- 1988: Derrick - "Die Mordsache Druse"
- 1989: General Hospital as Claudio Maldonado
- 1992: Derrick - "Mord im Treppenhaus"
- 1993: Derrick - "Ein Objekt der Begierde"
- 1994: Derrick - "Der Schlüssel"
- 1995: Derrick - "Ein Mord und lauter nette Leute"
- 1996: Derrick - "Zeuge Karuhn"
- 2005: Arme Millionäre
