= Rick Kavanian =

German actor, comedian, author, and voice actor (born 1971)

Richard "Rick" Kavanian
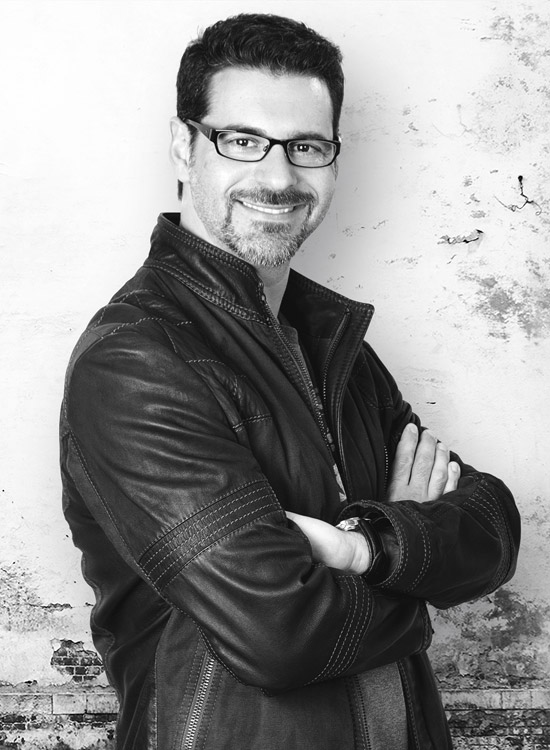
- Kavanian in 2015
- Born: Richard Horatio Kavanian; 26 January 1971 (age 55); Munich, West Germany
- Occupations: Actor; comedian; author; dubber
- Website: http://www.rick-kavanian.de/

Richard Horatio Kavanian (born 26 January 1971) is a German actor, comedian, author and voice actor. He is famous for his cooperation with Michael Herbig, which led to many popular movie comedies and parodies, e.g. Manitou's Shoe.

== Life ==
Rick Kavanian grew up with his parents, both Armenian, who emigrated from Bucharest to Munich in the 1950s, and his grandmother. As a child he learned to speak Romanian from his parents who used to live in Romania, Armenian from his grandmother and German and English in school.

From 1990 to 1994 Kavanian studied political science, North American history and psychology in Munich and Augsburg. The cooperation with Michael Herbig began in 1990, when both worked as authors and speakers for a German comedy radio show. In 1995 Kavanian moved to New York City and studied acting at the Lee Strasberg Theatre Institute. After his return to Germany, he played several roles alongside Herbig in the TV comedy show Easy Bully, which later served as the basis for the successful TV comedy show Bullyparade. Henceforth, Kavanian starred in several comedy movies, had many TV appearances and began his work as a successful stand-up comedian.

Kavanian lives in Munich with his wife Ilka. His personal idol is the British actor Peter Sellers.

== Filmography ==
as movie actor

- 2001: Manitou's Shoe
- 2001: Feuer, Eis & Dosenbier
- 2002: Erkan & Stefan gegen die Mächte der Finsternis
- 2004: Traumschiff Surprise – Periode 1
- 2006: Hui Buh: The Goofy Ghost
- 2007: Lissi und der wilde Kaiser
- 2007: Keinohrhasen
- 2008: 1½ Knights – In Search of the Ravishing Princess Herzelinde
- 2009: Mord ist mein Geschäft, Liebling
- 2010: Otto's Eleven
- 2017: Bullyparade: The Movie
- 2018: Jim Button and Luke the Engine Driver
- 2020: The Magic Kids: Three Unlikely Heroes
- 2020: Jim Button and the Wild 13
- 2021: Beckenrand Sheriff

as voice actor

- 1999: Austin Powers 2 (German voice of Austin Powers (Mike Myers))
- 2000: Happy Texas (German voice of Steve Zahn)
- 2000: South Park (German voice of Phillip (Trey Parker))
- 2002: Austin Powers 3 (German voice of Austin Powers, Dr. Evil, Fat Bastard and Goldmember (Mike Myers))
- 2004: Harold & Kumar (German voice of Kumar)
- 2005: Madagascar (German voice of Marty (Chris Rock))
- 2006: Cars (German voice of Luigi)
- 2006: Happy Feet (German voice of Ramon)
- 2006: Das hässliche Entlein & ich (German voice of Ratso)
- 2007: Lissi und der wilde Kaiser (several voices)
- 2007: Meet the Robinsons
- 2008: Kleiner Dodo
- 2008: The Love Guru (German voice of Mike Myers)
- 2008: Madagascar 2 (German voice of Marty (Chris Rock))
- 2010: Toy Story 3 (German voice of Rex)
- 2011: Cars 2 (German voice of Luigi)
- 2011: Happy Feet 2 (German voice of Ramon)
- 2012: Hotel Transylvania (German voice of Dracula)
- 2015: Hotel Transylvania 2 (German voice of Dracula)
- 2017: Cars 3 (German voice of Luigi)
- 2018: Hotel Transylvania 3: Summer Vacation (German voice of Dracula)
- 2018: Tabaluga

as actor and author on television

- 1996: Easy Bully
- 1997–2002: Bullyparade
- 2004–2006: Bully & Rick
- 2008–2009: Kosmopilot
- 2011-: Die Klugscheisser
