= Otto – Der Film =

1985 Germany comedy film

- Directed by: Xaver Schwarzenberger, Otto Waalkes
- Written by: Bernd Eilert, Robert Gernhardt, Peter Knorr, Otto Waalkes
- Produced by: Horst Wendlandt
- Starring: Otto Waalkes; Jessika Cardinahl; Elisabeth Wiedemann; Sky du Mont; Peter Kuiper
- Cinematography: Xaver Schwarzenberger
- Edited by: Jutta Hering
- Music by: Herb Geller
- Production company: Rialto Film
- Distributed by: Tobis Film
- Release date: 18 July 1985
- Running time: 85 minutes
- Country: West Germany
- Language: German

Otto – Der Film (German: Otto, the movie) is a West German comedy film from 1985, starring Otto Waalkes. With 14.5 million sold tickets it is among the most successful German movies.

It was shot at the Spandau Studios in West Berlin, with sets designed by the art director Hans Jürgen Kiebach. Location shooting took place around Hamburg.

== Plot ==
The film starts with debris floating in the middle of the ocean, including a toilet seat, through which Otto emerges and begins to relate how he has gotten to be in this situation.

Otto, a young East Frisian country boy, comes to the big city to make his fortune. Unfortunately, his naivety nearly ruins everything from the start as he falls victim to a loan shark—conveniently going under the name of "Shark"—from whom he borrows the capital to start his own forwarding business; the resulting debt of 9,876 DM and 50 Pfennig becomes a constant object of worry and temptation for Otto throughout the film.

During one of his earlier attempts to make money, Otto inadvertently saves the life of Silvia von Kohlen und Reibach, the young prospective heiress of an enormous family fortune. Otto is introduced to the Kohlen und Reibachs to receive their gratitude, but Otto is quick to note that he could use their wealth to pay back his debt. But every chance he gets slips through his fingers, either owing to the callings of his conscience (such as when he attempts to shoot a hare for a reward which matches his debts exactly) or by dumb luck (when the wine he receives from the Kohlen und Reibachs turns out to be quite valuable, but only after a wine lover has consumed a considerable quantity of it).

Silvia and Otto also find themselves drawn to each other, but their main obstacle against their getting together is Silvia's stern mother, Konsulin ("Consul") von Kohlen und Reibach, who wishes her daughter to marry someone from their social class. She has already identified a suitable candidate in Ernesto, a handsome South American millionaire.

In the end, Otto realizes his true affections for Silvia only after she and her mother prepare to depart for Rio de Janeiro for Silvia's wedding to Ernesto. On his way to tell Silvia about his feelings, Otto gets mixed up in a bank robbery committed by disputatious Sonnemann and Haenlein. Otto later smuggles himself aboard the plane the Kohlen und Reibachs are on, but among the passengers are also the two bankrobbers. Otto, disguised as the radio operator, attempts to inform Interpol but instead hits the pilot's announcement system, prompting Sonnemann and Haenlein to hijack the plane. Unfortunately, the two break out into another argument, in which course they knock out both pilots, so they force Otto to fly. This of course results in mayhem when Otto sends the plane rolling, subduing the two bankrobbers in the process; Otto reveals his presence and his love to Silvia, who happily joins him in the cockpit, and Konsulin von Kohle und Reichbach has to learn to her shock that "Ernesto" is really a fraud named Harald.

Otto subsequently attempts to land the passenger jet on an aircraft carrier, but of course fails spectacularly, thus looping back to the film's beginning sequence. Fortunately, all passengers on the plane, including Silvia and her mother, reach a tropical island, where they receive the warm welcome of a polonaise from the local carnival-obsessed natives and Otto and Silvia finally become an item.

== Cast ==
- Otto Waalkes: Otto
- Jessika Cardinahl: Silvia von Kohlen und Reibach
- Elisabeth Wiedemann: Konsulin von Kohlen und Reibach
- Sky du Mont: Ernesto (aka Harald)
- Peter Kuiper: Shark
- Karl Lieffen: Flopmann
- Tilly Lauenstein: madam
- Gottfried John: Sonnemann
- Andreas Mannkopff: Haenlein
- Lutz Mackensy: springbok owner
- Johannes Heesters: wine lover
- Günther Kaufmann: soldier "Bimbo"
- Panos Papadopulos: Stavros
- Wilken F. Dincklage: barkeeper
- Erich Bar: rocker

== Reception ==
The film was a box office success and had a record opening in West Germany with 768,535 admissions in its first weekend.

== Notes ==
- In German, the terms in the name "Kohlen und Reibach" are informal terms for "money" and "profit", used here as a parodic statement playing off the name of industrial dynasty von Bohlen und Halbach.
- The film features a parody of Michael Jackson's music video Thriller, except that the zombie dancers are replaced here with lookalikes of the German folksinger Heino adapting the song's tunes to the lyrics of Heino's version of "Schwarzbraun ist die Haselnuss".
- The polonaise song played during the appearance of the island natives is a recording of Gottlieb Wendehals' Polonäse Blankenese, which was a German chart hit in 1982.

== Sequels ==
Otto – Der neue Film (Otto: The New Movie), released in July 1987, had an even better opening weekend with admissions of 1,042,876, another German record. This was followed by Otto – Der Außerfriesische (Otto: The Alien from East Frisia) (1989); Otto – Der Liebesfilm (Otto: The Romance Film) (1992); and Otto – Der Katastrofenfilm (Otto: The Disaster Movie) (2000). Otto – Der Liebesfilm was the highest grossing German film of 1992 with 2.8 million admissions and a gross over $10 million.
