= Traumschiff Surprise – Periode 1 =

2004 film by Michael Herbig

(T)Raumschiff Surprise – Periode 1
- Theatrical release poster
- Directed by: Michael Herbig
- Written by: Michael Herbig; Alfons Biedermann; Rick Kavanian
- Based on: Star Trek by Gene Roddenberry Bullyparade by Michael Bully Herbig
- Produced by: Michael Herbig; Patty Saffeels; Michael Waldleitner
- Starring: Michael Herbig; Rick Kavanian; Christian Tramitz; Anja Kling; Til Schweiger; Sky du Mont
- Cinematography: Stephan Schuh
- Edited by: Alexander Dittner
- Music by: Ralf Wengenmayr; Stefan Raab
- Production company: Herbx Film
- Distributed by: Constantin Film
- Release date: 22 July 2004
- Running time: 87 minutes
- Country: Germany
- Language: German

(T)Raumschiff Surprise – Periode 1 ("Dream/Spaceship Surprise — Period 1") is a 2004 German comedy film by Michael "Bully" Herbig. It is a spoof of the 1960s American television series Star Trek and parodies several science fiction films. The film follows the eccentric crew of the spaceship Surprise in the year 2304, who must travel back in time to the year 2004 to save Earth from a Martian invasion.

As a spiritual successor to Der Schuh des Manitu, the film is based on a recurring skit from Herbig's TV show Bullyparade, "Unser (T)Raumschiff". The title and plot allude to Raumschiff Enterprise, the German title of Star Trek. Raumschiff is the German word for spacecraft; Traumschiff means "dream ship", which was also a reference to Das Traumschiff, a German television series, similar to the series The Love Boat.

== Plot ==
The movie begins at a place which appears to be Nevada's legendary Area 51. A visiting general is led down into an underground complex where he is shown a captured alien. The alien resembles a chubby Vulcan in a cowboy costume, and greets the general with a "What are you looking at so stupidly?".

The next scene opens 300 years later, in 2304. Earth is under attack by the fleet of the Mars Regulator and his asthmatic right hand (and son) Jens Maul. With most of Earth's forces destroyed, the Queen Metapha (from "metaphor", played by Anja Kling) of Earth and her secretaries debate their last options. They decide to call for the crew of the Surprise, Earth's last available, penis-and-testicles-shaped starship, to travel 300 years back in time. Their mission is to destroy a UFO which had crashed in Nevada in 2004. Its technology had enabled mankind to colonize Mars in the first place, hence its destruction would prevent the attack 300 years later. (A similar theme appears in the Terminator movie series.)

At first, Captain Kork is very reluctant to follow the order to return to Earth immediately (because he, Spuck and Schrotty intend to try out for a 'Miss Waikiki' contest), but ultimately, he changes his mind. Technical problems ("damage done by martens") prevent direct transport, however, so Kork orders Schrotty to call a space taxi. The taxi is driven by Rock (played by Til Schweiger), who is found attractive by both Kork and Spuck. Rock manages to break through the Martian blockade, but during the action, the taxi is chased and damaged heavily, finally crashing beside the Queen's palace. Kork, Spuck and Schrotty are advised on their mission and are then seated into the time machine, which looks like an old sofa. When the Regulator's forces attack the capital city, Rock and Metapha join Kork and Spucky "in" the device, while Schrotty remains behind. Jens Maul acquires the time machine's manual, builds his own and follows the foursome back in time.

Under constant harassment by Jens Maul, the travellers have a couple of unplanned sojourns. In 1304 Britain, they are forced to participate in a tournament held by Lord William the Last (Sky du Mont), then in Nevada during the Wild West era, they run afoul of Santa Maria (du Mont in a reprisal of his role in Der Schuh des Manitu). Upon arrival in the West, the time sofa is smashed by a speeding train, but the group captures Maul's time machine and uses it to reach the year 2004. Once more, they encounter Maul, who has painstakingly reassembled the ruined time sofa, and witness the UFO (which turns out to be no bigger than a football) crashing. A beer-guzzling alien the size of a human hand emerges and, in its haste to consume more alcohol, it begins to choke. Spucky tries to help by offering Maul's asthma spray, but the pressure created by the device blows up the creature. The group obliterates the UFO and scrambles onto the sofa, just as the local military arrives. The control panel shows an overload of 76.375 kilograms – Spucky's exact weight. With a heavy heart, Spucky remains behind.

The story switches back to Area 51, where Spuck has just finished telling his tale. The government officials are not convinced until Spuck provides proof in the form of a futuristic piece of technology, a thermometer with a vibrating alarm, which he had inserted just before departure. As Kork, Rock and Metapha get back to the future, Spuck is already awaiting them. Spuck has survived because he's a Vulcanette, who have extraordinarily long lifespans, and has been busy re-decorating Earth within the last 300 years (it is now all in pink). Kork and his men get to participate in the Miss Waikiki contest after all - but the ever-relentless Jens Maul has the last word.

== Cast ==
- Michael "Bully" Herbig as Mr. Spuck / (Brigitte Spuck)
- Rick Kavanian as Jens Maul/Schrotty/Pulle
- Christian Tramitz as Jürgen T. Kork
- Anja Kling as Queen Metapha
- Til Schweiger as Rock Fertig-Aus (Rock Finished-Over, actually Rock Finished, but divorced from a certain Ms Over and once having decided for a double family name)
- Sky du Mont as William the Last/Santa Maria
- Hans-Michael Rehberg as Regulator Rogul
- Christoph Maria Herbst as William the Last's Adviser
- Siegfried Terpoorten as Jim
- Tim Wilde as John
- Hans Peter Hallwachs as Consul Kanon
- Reiner Schöne as Senator Bean
- Anton Figl as Popowitsch
- Stacia Widmer as Miss Bora Bora
- Errol Trotmann-Harewood as General Baby
- Andreas Seifert as Captain of the Mars-Troops
- Albee Lesotho as Cleaner-Spy
- Jumbo Schreiner as the big knight at William's Court

== Production and allusions ==
After the success of Der Schuh des Manitu, Michael "Bully" Herbig had asked his Bullyparade audience to decide his next movie project. Open for selection were: a sequel to Der Schuh des Manitu; (T)Raumschiff Surprise; a movie about another regular sketch in the show centered on Sissi (which was eventually realized as the animated film Lissi und der wilde Kaiser); a "Movie No One Would Ever Expect" with the same name; or an advice to Herbig to keep his hands off making movies altogether. The majority chose the space theme.

(T)Raumschiff Surprise parodies the (mostly science fiction) films Star Trek, Star Wars: Episode I – The Phantom Menace, The Fifth Element, Back to the Future, The Time Machine, Independence Day, A Knight's Tale, Men in Black, Minority Report, High Noon, The Matrix, E.T. the Extra-Terrestrial, and Twelve Monkeys. (T)Raumschiff Surprise has a prequel scene to Der Schuh des Manitu when the protagonists travel back in time to the wild west. They meet Santa Maria (the antagonist of Der Schuh des Manitu) who offers the Apaches a new saloon for sale, a central scene in Der Schuh des Manitu.

The scene in which Kork and Spuck attempt to beam off the Surprise by stepping onto several lighted numbered floor panels, is a reference to the German TV children's game show Eins, Zwei oder Drei (the German version of Runaround). The panels are part of a triple-choice quiz system, and any children who stand on the correct panel (i.e. with the number of the correct answer) may collect points for their respective team.

=== Characters ===
Several characters from the original Star Trek movie are parodied. The main characters speak with a very strong Bavarian accent in the German soundtrack. Herbig once described the movie as "a group of girl-roommates on adventure". The names are all parodies of the original characters of Star Trek. Captain Kork (Christian Tramitz) is a take on Captain Kirk, korken means "to cork"); Mr. Spuck (Michael "Bully" Herbig) is a take on Spock, Spucke means "spit"; and the engineer, Schrotty (Rick Kavanian) is a play on Scotty, Schrott means "trash / junk". The characters act stereotypically gay. Kavanian also plays Jens Maul, a play on Darth Maul, Maul means "maw", despite the fact the character looks like Darth Vader, and Doc Pulle who is a parody of Leonard McCoy's character's German nickname, Pille, which means "pill". Pulle is a German colloquialism for "bottle", as in "eine Pulle Rum" (a bottle of rum) or "eine Pulle Bier" (a bottle of beer).

== Soundtrack ==
The title and incidental music was composed by Ralf Wengenmayr. The closing title song, Space Taxi by Stefan Raab featuring Spucky, Kork and Schrotty, was released as a single which reached No. 2 in Austria and Germany and No. 7 in Switzerland.

== Awards ==
- 2004 - Bambi
- 2004 - Deutscher Comedypreis (Bester Comedian: Michael "Bully" Herbig)
- 2004 - Deutscher Comedypreis (Beste Kino-Komödie)
- 2004 - Goldene Leinwand mit Stern
- 2004 - Box Office Germany Award (Bogey) in platinum
- 2005 - DIVA-Award - Der Deutsche Kinopreis (Publikumspreis)

== Critical response ==
While popular at large with the audience, there has been some negative criticism. Some critics said there was a lack of wit that had made Der Schuh des Manitu popular.
