= Irshad Panjatan =

Irshad Panjatan (born 7 September 1931) is an Indian actor and veteran mime artist, based in Berlin, who introduced the art form to India during the 1960s. He started his career as stage actor, acted in few Bollywood films, and later received acclaim as mime artist. He toured through West-Asian and European countries in 1971, which led him to Berlin, where he settled down. Over the years he has even acted in a few Hollywood and German films, Manitou's Shoe (2001), Free Rainer (2007), God is No Soprano (2003) and Iron Sky (2012).

== Early life and family ==
Panjatan was born in Hyderabad, where he grew up with seven siblings, including his elder brother, Dr. Abid Hussain (1926 – 2012), who later became an economist, civil servant and diplomat.

== Career ==
Panjatan started his career as an aviation engineer, however he left the city for Delhi in 1950 to pursue his passion for theatre and acting. He trained in Kathakali under Raghavan Nair and later under Narendra Sharma, a disciple of Uday Shankar. He started his career as an actor with the Hindustani Theatre, the theatre group of Begum Qudsia Zaidi. In 1957, he enacted a night theft scene in play Charudatta, in which he used no dialogues. However, a review of Marg magazine, called it "..very good Pantomime", this intrigued him and ventured into learning the art form. Soon, he happened to see a local mime artist perform on the streets of Delhi, and in the next hour he learned all that he could from him, and started practicing and improvising on his own.

He performed his first mime play in 1962 in Delhi, thus introducing mime to India in the 1960s, which earned him wide acclaimed. Hindustani Theatre closed and he began to focus mainly on mime, though he also acted in a few Bollywood films during this period, including K.A. Abbas's Saat Hindustani (1969), wherein he played a role of a Portuguese spy.

Though trained in the Marcel Marceau style, he developed his individualistic style and language, and soon he started touring with his solo mime act. The Films Division also made some public service documentary with him, including Kilonewala (1971) and Six, Five, Four, Three, Two (on Family Planning), before he left for his tour outside India, to West Asian and European countries. After leaving India, he first performed at the Lahore Women's college and eventually reached Germany where he later settled, and has continued performing as a solo artist ever since. Over the years, he has acted in a few German and Hollywood films, Iron Sky and God is no Soprano, Der Schuh des Manitu (Manitou's Shoe) (2001), Hans Christian Andersen: My Life as a Fairy Tale (2003) and Reclaim Your Brain (2007).

He married Ingrid Sattler in 1975, and opened a mime school in Berlin, where he continues to live. He gave his last mime performance in December 2008 in Pune at the annual 'Theatre Beyond Words' festival organized by Amol Palekar, where he performed his solo act, 'Walk of Life'. Five years later in July 2012, while visiting family in his home town, he gave a lecture-demonstration on mime in Hyderabad at Lamakaan.

== Filmography ==
=== Film ===
- Aasmaan Mahal (1965)
- Bambai Raat Ki Bahon Mein (1967) - Sevakram
- Saat Hindustani (1969)
- Heer Raanjha (1970)
- Chhoti Bahu (1971) - Servant
- Bikhre Moti (1971) - Raju
- Der Schuh des Manitu (2001, Manitou's Shoe) - Häuptling Listiger Lurch
- Der Ärgermacher (2003, The Troublemaker) - Der Inder
- God is No Soprano (2003)
- Kebab Connection (2004) - Indischer Taxifahrer
- Free Rainer (2007, Reclaim Your Brain) - Gopal
- Iron Sky (2012) - Indian Representative
- The Physician (2013) - Pharmacist
- Marry Me - Aber bitte auf Indisch (2015) - Ankur
- Buddha's Little Finger (2015) - Buddha
- Bullyparade: Der Film (2017) - Costa

=== Television ===
- Hans Christian Andersen: My Life as a Fairy Tale (2003, TV Movie) - Flunky
