= Der Schuh des Manitu =

2001 film by Michael Herbig

- Theatrical release poster
- Directed by: Michael Herbig
- Written by: Michael Herbig
- Based on: Winnetou by Karl May; Bullyparade by Michael Bully Herbig
- Produced by: Michael Herbig
- Starring: Michael Herbig; Christian Tramitz; Rick Kavanian; Sky du Mont; Marie Bäumer; Hilmi Sözer
- Cinematography: Stephan Schuh
- Edited by: Alexander Dittner
- Music by: Ralf Wengenmayr
- Production companies: Constantin Film; herbX film; SevenPictures
- Distributed by: Constantin Film
- Release date: 19 July 2001 (Germany)
- Running time: 82 minutes (original edition); 88 minutes (extended edition)
- Country: Germany
- Language: German
- Budget: €4.5M (~€3.1M in 2021)
- Box office: US$75.5M

Der Schuh des Manitu (transl. Manitou's Shoe) is a 2001 German Western parody film. Directed by Michael Herbig, it is a film adaptation of the Winnetou sketches from his ProSieben television show Bullyparade. The film stars Herbig and Christian Tramitz as a Apache chief and his cowboy blood brother who must hunt for a legendary treasure to pay off a tribal debt before a band of ruthless outlaws beats them to it. Rick Kavanian, Sky du Mont, Marie Bäumer, and Hilmi Sözer also star in supporting roles.

With earnings of about €65 million (US$70 million) and as of 30 April 2002, 11.7 million visitors in cinemas, it is one of the most successful German movies after the Second World War. A sequel, Das Kanu des Manitu, was released in 2025, with Herbig, Tramitz, Kavanian, and du Mont reprising their roles.

== Plot ==
Abahachi (Michael Herbig), chief of the Apache, and his blood brother Ranger (Christian Tramitz) are an inseparable pair since Ranger saved Abahachi from a speeding train at an unguarded railroad crossing. When they aim to buy a pub with the monetary help of Shoshone chief Stinking Lizard (Listiger Lurch in the German original, lit. 'Cunning Amphibian') through supposed Wyoming real estate agent Santa Maria (Sky du Mont), the deal as well as the pub, which turns out to be just a prop-up facade, collapse.

Santa Maria kills Stinking Lizard's son (Falscher Hase in the German original, lit. 'Fake Hare', German vernacular for meatloaf), who was supposed to deliver the loan. Stinking Lizard believes Santa Maria's claims that Abahachi and Ranger killed the chief's son, and upon their return to the Shoshone tribe, the two find themselves unjustly charged with murder.

While bound to a stake right next to Ranger, awaiting their execution and nonetheless having one of their frequent squabbles, Abahachi remembers a secret treasure kept inside a large, shoe-shaped rock called Manitou's Shoe, a reference to Treasure of Silver Lake, which Abahachi intends to recover in order to reimburse Stinking Lizard. The map leading to the treasure was left to Abahachi by Chief Grey Star, his deceased grandfather, also Herbig, in the extended "Extra Large" version.

In a drunken bout following his demise it was divided into four parts, which were distributed among Abahachi himself; his effeminate gay twin brother Winnetouch (also Herbig), the proprietor of a beauty ranch; Abahachi's Greek friend Dimitri (Rick Kavanian); and his former "hough school" honey — and Ranger's fledgling love interest — Ursula ("Uschi").

Unfortunately, Santa's right-hand man Hombre overhears the blood brothers' plans, and Santa plans to get the treasure for himself. They enable the two captives' escape, in which they inadvertently kill Stinking Lizard's pet rabbit, prompting the Shoshone chief to declare war on them and unbury a folding chair in lieu of a hatchet.

To gather the other parts of the map, Abahachi and Ranger travel across the land to meet with Winnetouch on his all-pink ranch-turned-beauty-plaza, the Powder Rouge Ranch (Puder Rosa, a pun on Bonanza's Ponderosa). Winnetouch eventually remembers who Abahachi gave the other map pieces to, setting Abahachi and Ranger on Uschi's and Dimitri's trail. The trio notices Santa Maria's gang surrounding them, so Winnetouch dresses up as Abahachi to distract them, while Abahachi and Ranger ride off to gather the other pieces of the map.

Knowing they are short on time, they decide to split up; Abahachi goes to find Dimitri, while Ranger seeks out Uschi. Meanwhile, Winnetouch is captured and held at the Powder Rose Ranch under Hombre's watch, but the two grow closer as they spend time together.

Just as Uschi, whom Ranger finds as a singer in a bar, gets ready to give Ranger her piece of the map, Santa Maria finds and captures them. When the two of them don't show up at the meeting point, Abahachi and Dimitri, whom Abahachi found as the proprietor of a dingy bar, decide to go rescue them. During the rescue attempt Abahachi gets captured as well, bringing Santa Maria in possession of all the map pieces. He takes off with his gang to head for the treasure, taking Uschi with him since she tattooed the map on her back, and because he has taken an interest in her, leaving the others tied up in the ranch house which he sets on fire. Before they burn to death, Dimitri comes to their rescue.

Santa Maria finds the mountain in which the treasure is hidden and goes inside, leaving his gang to guard the entrance. Abahachi, Winnetouch and Ranger manage to save Uschi and convince Hombre to join them. While Dimitri distracts the rest of the gang, the others go after Santa Maria. They get the treasure, a diamond necklace, from Santa Maria, who triggers and drowns in a mud trap.

In the ensuing shenanigans, they lose the necklace. Upon their exit of the mountain they find themselves surrounded by the Shoshone and Santa Maria's gang. In the subsequent fight, Santa Maria's gang is defeated. Hombre clears Abahachi's name and returns the embezzled gold to Stinking Lizard, ending the hostilities.

In the end, each character realizes their dream and Uschi, while pregnant with her and Ranger's child, urges him to set off with Abahachi, and both heroes ride into the sunset for new adventures.

== Cast ==
- Michael Herbig as Abahachi/Winnetouch/Grey Star (extended version only)
- Christian Tramitz as Ranger
- Sky du Mont as Santa Maria
- Marie Bäumer as Uschi
- Rick Kavanian as Dimitri
- Hilmi Sözer as Hombre
- Irshad Panjatan as Schoschone-Chieftain Listiger Lurch (lit. 'Cunning Amphibian')
- Oliver Wnuk as Jack
- Tim Wilde as John
- Siegfried Terpoorten as Jim
- Robinson Reichel as Joe

Uncredited Actors

- Natalia Avelon as young Uschi
- Friedrich Schoenfelder as the Narrator
- Diana Herold as Blonde native woman

== Main characters ==
Abahachi, chief of the Apache is a pun on aber hatschi (lit. 'but achoo'), which is what some Germans say when somebody sneezes. It is also hinting at Winnetou and the Half-Breed, which is an original movie based on the works of Karl May from the 60s, and a character from Karl May's books called Apanatschi.

Ranger, the name of his blood brother sounds very much like Stewart Granger, the actor that played Old Surehand in three of the Karl May films. Moreover, it's an allusion to a character of the American Western named Lone Ranger. He was also fighting in the name of justice and was normally accompanied by his Native American friend Tonto.

Abahachi's homosexual twin called Winnetouch is a persiflage on Winnetou. His beauty farm called Puder Rosa Ranch (lit. 'Powder Pink Ranch') is a play on the name of the ranch in the Western TV series Bonanza that was owned by the Cartwright family and was called Ponderosa Ranch.

The seductive beauty called Uschi is named after Uschi Glas, the actress that played the Native American girl Apanatschi in Winnetou and the Half-Breed.

The grandfather is called Grauer Star (cataract; literally "Grey Starling" or "Grey Star") and might be modelled on the wise and white-haired character Klekih-petra ('White father') from the film Apache Gold. Moreover, as Abahachi's Grampa he's obviously grey haired and, being a sought-after singer on stage, also a star.

The name of the businessman, Santa Maria, is a play on the name of the villain Santer from the trilogy of the Winnetou movies based on the works of Karl May and the main character in the movie The Oil Prince. Hombre, the name of his henchman, is probably taken from the US Western Hombre that stars Paul Newman.

The chef of the restaurant called Dimitri is alluding to a Mexican character as his tavern is in Texas. He might also be hinting at the film The Frisco Kid. Another possible interpretation might be the play on the Mediterranean type in Spaghetti Western. The character had already appeared in the German TV show Bullyparade where he played a host in the series called Klatschcafé mit Dimitri (lit. 'Gossiping with Dimitri'). His phrase wenn ich nicht irre (transl. if I'm not mistaken) also reminds of the character Sam Hawkens from the Karl May movies of the 60s.

== Background ==
The film borrows from the parodies of Mel Brooks like Robin Hood: Men in Tights, Blazing Saddles, and Dracula: Dead and Loving It. Its humour consists largely of blatant anachronisms, scenes such as the character Ranger getting stopped by a sheriff for "fast riding" and being asked for his "riding license", or Santa Maria connecting the dots on a map by using a feather with a marker-tip. Greek character Dimitri owns a mule named Apollo 13 (his twelve brothers — and subsequently, he as well — were killed by speeding trains), and for lack of a hatchet the Shoshones, a Native American tribe, dig out a seemingly dispensable folding-chair as a replacement.

The film has several references to the Karl May films of the 1960s and to Herbig's own TV show. It features many puns that are difficult to translate into English. In the German version, Abahachi, Ranger and Winnetouch all speak with a clearly Bavarian accent that is predominant in the Bullyparade-Show, which is mentioned by the barkeeper at the saloon by "You must be Ranger, the man with the Southern States slang".

Many scenes were shot in Almería, Spain, at the same places that can be seen in many movies of Sergio Leone. Most of the Indians in the movie are actually Spanish. The Shoshone chief is played by an East Indian, for humorous effect, and his two advisors are Native Americans. According to Herbig's comments, some Spanish can be heard on the DVD, and he was never entirely sure if the Spanish actors really knew what kind of movie they were participating in.

The Mexican Hombre is played by Hilmi Sözer, a Turkish-German actor. Diana Herold, a photo model and regular extra performer on Herbig's show Bullyparade, performs a cameo role as a blonde native woman. The role of Abahachi's and Winnetouch's mother was performed by German comedian Anke Engelke in the film's Extra Large version; and French actor Pierre Brice (in his role as Winnetou) is humorously referred to as their father. The "guest" appearance by Winnetou author Karl May was performed by Alexander Held.

Michael Herbig's following movie, the science fiction parody Traumschiff Surprise – Periode 1, features a prequel scene to Der Schuh des Manitou due to time travel.

== Winnetou novels ==
Der Schuh des Manitu parodies a series of wild west adventure novels of the 19th century German author Karl May.

The main topic of these novels is the deep friendship of a fictional Mescalero Apache chief (Winnetou) and his German companion and blood-brother, (Old Shatterhand), who are both exemplary virtuous and stand together to keep the peace between Indians and immigrating White settlers. Der Schuh des Manitu spoofs the friendship motif in the Winnetou novels and in their 1960s film adaptations which has largely led to high, but sometimes idealised and cliché-ridden admiration of Native Americans in Germany. Many shots of the original Winnetou movies feature Old Shatterhand and Winnetou riding side by side, accompanied by romantic orchestral music (which also happens in the parody).

Winnetou's main objection against European settlers is their greed. He dislikes that they want to take all the land for themselves and cannot share with the natives. A recurring opponent is the bandit Santer who kills Winnetou's father and sister, probably the namesake of Santa Maria in the parody.

There is also a movie called Winnetou und das Halbblut Apanatschi (transl. Winnetou and the Crossbreed) based not on a May novel but using his characters – the name of the movie's main character Abahachi is probably based on this. So is the name of Uschi, Abahachis's old love, hinting to the name of actress Uschi Glas who used to play Apanatschi.

== Connections ==
The plot of the movie is closely related to productions based on the works of Karl May such as the film Treasure of Silver Lake. The recurring pattern consists of the "evil white man", who tricks the "good white man". The Native Americans then think the good man is evil and thus dig up the hatchet, which leads to fights about a secret treasure. In the end, only Winnetou and Old Shatterhand can save the day.

Similarities to other film classics and cultural events of the 60s are also part of the movie. For example, when the chief of the Shoshones called Cunning Amphibian (Listiger Lurch) carries a bunny in his arms. This is similar to how Ernst Stavro Blofeld once held a cat in the James Bond movies or how the artist Joseph Beuys explains pictures to a dead hare in order to teach philosophical concepts.

One of the film's running gags is Winnetouch, riding ladie's style and holding a parasol, constantly admonishing his horse Shá:ckèlinè (for Jaqueline) not to move too fast for otherwise she would be having to puke again.

The movie makes further references to spaghetti western by Sergio Leone, Dances With Wolves by Kevin Costner, the mining cart ride from the second Indiana Jones movie by Steven Spielberg as well as different scenes from Terminator 2. The theme playing before The Shoe of the movie first appears is reminiscent of the Indiana Jones movies. On the zither, Winnetouch plays the Harry Lime Theme from the movie The Third Man, when he, Abahachi and Ranger are on the Powder Rose Ranch. Later, when Uschi and Ranger are captured by Santa Maria, Ranger plays Moon River from Breakfast at Tiffany's on his harmonica.

This way, Der Schuh des Manitu uses components from different genres:

The comedy film appeals to people who have experienced the simple TV age with three programs and have been socialized with Karl May's stories (he makes a short appearance) and shows like The Virginian and Gunsmoke. Like spaghetti westerns it was filmed in Almería in Spain and there are lots of men with stubbly faces and a cigarette butt or a harmonica in their mouth, posing like Clint Eastwood and Charles Bronson. Especially the many funny details, quotes and jokes are reminiscent of Asterix comics.

In Karl May's short appearance he presents his book Treasure of Silver Lake, that also features a ride on a draisine. When Santa Maria dies in a mud trap, Winnetouch quotes Wilhelm Busch's children's classic Max and Moritz.

In the end the Shoshone appear at Manitou's Shoe and sing a song to the melody the soldiers in Stanley Kubrick's Full Metal Jacket sing while marching. In the last scene of the movie the narrator mentions Uschi and Ranger's child being called Stan Laurel.

== Production ==
The movie was shot in early summer of 2000 in the desert in southern Spain, as well as the Arri-Studios in Munich. Bully Herbig explained,

the biggest compromise would have been [former] Yugoslavia, but that wasn't 'Western' to me. I would have loved to shoot in America. I searched literally everywhere, South Africa, Australia, Morocco until we landed on the holy ground of Sergio Leone. I flew in, looked at it and said – this is it, 100 percent.

Consequently, the majority of the movie was shot in Almería in southern Spain. The filming ended on 19 June 2000.

== Reviews ==
The Lexikon des Internationalen Films (transl. Encyclopedia of international Movies) called the movie a,

parody in proper style that bases itself on the Karl May movies of the 60s even to the smallest technical details and presents itself as a completely mindless revue without fear of using trivialities and dirty jokes in order to entertain in a superficial and silly way. The mechanics of old cinema cliches are only being exposed in order to spread the new cliches of the current comedy culture.

The movie generally earns praise for how accurately it implements stylistic elements of the Karl May adaptations and spaghetti westerns. The specific jokes however, are often characterized as silliness of only mediocre quality. The acting performances are rated rather lowly apart from very few exceptions.

According to Spiegel Online, Herbig seems "to have trusted in the Winnetou sketches of his TV-show Bullyparade also working on the big screen, which is not always the case." Spiegel Online perceives Sky Du Mont's performance as the most outstanding one of the movie. The acting abilities of the other actors were "below-average." Nevertheless, Spiegel Online acknowledged Herbig's "highly professional" staging.

Pierre Brice, lead of the Karl May films, and his eastern German counterpart Gojko Mitić reject the comedy due to it ridiculing and disparaging the culture of the Native Americans. Brice still praised Herbig's directing.

The TV magazine Prisma called the movie "irrelevant" and says: "The main characters speak Bavarian, are completely brainless and make abysmal jokes, that almost could not be worse."

The Stern in January 2009 called the movie a "Blockbuster whose only funny point is an extremely gay Native American."

== Sequel ==
In January 2024, the filming of a sequel, titled Das Kanu des Manitu (lit. 'Manitou's Canoe') was announced, in which Herbig, Tramitz and Kavanian reprised their roles from Der Schuh des Manitu. The film premiered in Germany on 14 August 2025. It proved as similarly successful as its predecessor, scoring over three million visitors in four weeks and earning the Goldene Leinwand.
