= Lissi und der wilde Kaiser =

- Directed by: Michael Herbig
- Written by: Alfons Biedermann; Michael Herbig
- Based on: Sissi by Ernst Marischka; Bullyparade by Michael Bully Herbig
- Release date: 25 October 2007
- Running time: 85 minutes
- Country: Germany
- Language: German

Lissi und der wilde Kaiser (Lissi and the Wild Emperor) is a 2007 German animated film comedy parody of the Sissi films.

== Plot ==
A yeti makes a pact with the devil to kidnap the most beautiful girl in the world. This turns out to be the Princess Lissi, who is clearly the Bavarian Princess and later Empress Elisabeth of Austria, and much of the film is taken up with subplots related to the court and to the romantic relationship between Elisabeth and her husband. The "wild" emperor of the title is thus Franz Joseph I of Austria, though it is also a play on the "Wilder Kaiser", a ridge in the Austrian Kaiser Mountains.

The film had more than 2 million viewers at cinemas in Germany alone, and more than 3 million in Europe overall.
