= List of Warner Bros. films (2000–2009) =

The following is a list of films distributed by Warner Bros. Pictures in the 2000s. This list does not include direct-to-video releases, nor does it include films Warner Bros. gained the rights to as a result of mergers or acquisitions.

== 2000 ==
| Release Date | Title | Notes |
|---|---|---|
| January 12, 2000 | My Dog Skip | distribution under Warner Bros. Family Entertainment only; produced by Alcon Entertainment |
| January 28, 2000 | The Big Tease | co-production with Crawford P. Productions and I Should Coco Films |
| February 18, 2000 | The Whole Nine Yards (Note: Owned by Morgan Creek Entertainment, with international distribution rights licensed to Revolution Studios and home media, television and streaming rights licensed to Sony Pictures, with select distribution rights also sub-licensed to Relativity Media and Shout! Studios) | North American, U.K., Irish and South African distribution with Morgan Creek Productions only; produced by Franchise Pictures, Rational Packaging and Lansdown Films |
| March 22, 2000 | Romeo Must Die | co-production with Silver Pictures |
| April 7, 2000 | Ready to Rumble | distribution outside France, Germany, Austria and Switzerland only; co-production with Bel-Air Entertainment, Outlaw Productions and Tollin/Robbins Productions |
| April 21, 2000 | Gossip (Note: Co-owned by Alcon Entertainment) | distribution outside Australia, New Zealand, Greece, Cyprus and Singapore only; co-production with Village Roadshow Pictures, NPV Entertainment and Outlaw Productions |
| May 12, 2000 | Battlefield Earth | distribution in North America, the U.K., Ireland, South Africa, France, Germany, Austria, Switzerland, Scandinavia, the Benelux, Italy, Spain and Andorra with Morgan Creek Productions only; produced by Franchise Pictures and JTP Films |
| June 30, 2000 | The Perfect Storm | co-production with Baltimore Spring Creek Pictures and Radiant Productions |
| July 19, 2000 | The In Crowd | distribution in North and Latin America, the U.K., Ireland, France, Spain, Andorra, Eastern Europe and Asia excluding Japan only; produced by Morgan Creek Productions |
| July 21, 2000 | Pokémon: The Movie 2000 (Note: Owned by Nintendo of America) | distribution outside Asia under Kids' WB/Warner Bros. Family Entertainment only; produced by Nintendo and 4Kids Entertainment |
| August 4, 2000 | Space Cowboys | distribution outside Australia, New Zealand, Greece, Cyprus and Singapore only; co-production with Village Roadshow Pictures, Clipsal Films, Malpaso Productions and Mad Chance Productions |
| August 11, 2000 | The Replacements | distribution outside France, Germany, Austria and Switzerland only; co-production with Bel-Air Entertainment and Dylan Sellers Productions |
| August 25, 2000 | The Art of War | U.S., U.K. and Irish distribution with Morgan Creek Productions; produced by Franchise Pictures, Amen Ra Films and Filmline International |
| September 15, 2000 | Bait | distribution only; produced by Castle Rock Entertainment and 3 Arts Entertainment |
| September 15, 2000 | Into the Arms of Strangers: Stories of the Kindertransport | Winner of the Academy Award for Best Documentary Feature co-production with Sabine Films and United States Holocaust Memorial Museum |
| September 22, 2000 | The Exorcist: The Version You've Never Seen | re-release co-production with Hoya Productions; Inducted into the National Film Registry in 2010 |
| September 27, 2000 | Best in Show | distribution only; produced by Castle Rock Entertainment |
| October 6, 2000 | Get Carter (Note: Co-owned by Morgan Creek Entertainment, with international distribution rights licensed to Revolution Studios, which has sub-licensed television and streaming rights to Sony Pictures) | distribution in North and Latin America, the U.K., Ireland, South Africa, France, Germany, Austria, Scandinavia, the Benelux, Italy and Spain with Morgan Creek Productions only; produced by Franchise Pictures and The Canton Company |
| October 20, 2000 | Pay It Forward | distribution outside France, Germany, Austria and Switzerland only; co-production with Bel-Air Entertainment and Tapestry Films |
| November 10, 2000 | Red Planet | distribution outside Australia, New Zealand, Greece, Cyprus and Singapore only; co-production with Village Roadshow Pictures, NPV Entertainment and The Mark Canton Company |
| December 8, 2000 | Proof of Life | distribution outside France, Germany, Austria and Switzerland only; produced by Castle Rock Entertainment, Bel-Air Entertainment and Anvil Films |
| December 22, 2000 | Miss Congeniality | distribution outside Australia, New Zealand, Greece, Cyprus and Singapore only; produced by Castle Rock Entertainment, Village Roadshow Pictures, NPV Entertainment and Fortis Films |

== 2001 ==
| Release Date | Title | Notes |
|---|---|---|
| January 19, 2001 | The Pledge | distribution in North America, the U.K., Ireland, South Africa, France, Germany, Austria, Scandinavia, the Benelux, Italy, Spain and India with Morgan Creek Productions only; produced by Franchise Pictures and Clyde Is Hungry Films |
| February 2, 2001 | Valentine | distribution outside Australia, New Zealand, Greece, Cyprus and Singapore only; co-production with Village Roadshow Pictures, NPV Entertainment and Dylan Sellers Productions |
| February 16, 2001 | Sweet November | distribution outside France, Germany, Austria and Switzerland only; co-production with Bel-Air Entertainment and 3 Arts Entertainment |
| February 23, 2001 | 3000 Miles to Graceland | distribution in North America, the U.K., Ireland, South Africa, France, Germany, Austria, Scandinavia, the Benelux and India with Morgan Creek Productions only; produced by Franchise Pictures and Lightstone Entertainment |
| March 2, 2001 | See Spot Run | distribution outside Australia, New Zealand, Greece, Cyprus and Singapore only; co-production with Village Roadshow Pictures, NPV Entertainment and Robert Simonds Productions |
| March 3, 2001 | Chain of Fools | distribution outside France, Germany, Austria and Switzerland only; produced by Bel-Air Entertainment, City Block Films and Weaver/Lord Productions; direct-to-video in the U.S. |
| March 16, 2001 | Exit Wounds | distribution outside Australia, New Zealand, Greece, Cyprus and Singapore only; co-production with Village Roadshow Pictures, NPV Entertainment and Silver Pictures |
| April 6, 2001 | Pokémon 3: The Movie | distribution outside Asia under Kids' WB/Warner Bros. Family Entertainment only; produced by Nintendo and 4Kids Entertainment |
| April 27, 2001 | Driven | distribution in North America, the U.K., Ireland, South Africa, France, Germany, Austria, Scandinavia, the Benelux and Italy only; produced by Franchise Pictures |
| May 4, 2001 | The Dish | North American distribution only; produced by Working Dog and Distant Horizon |
| May 18, 2001 | Angel Eyes | distribution in North and Latin America, the U.K., Ireland, South Africa, France, Germany, Austria, Scandinavia, the Benelux, Italy, Spain and India with Morgan Creek Productions only; produced by Franchise Pictures and The Canton Company |
| June 8, 2001 | Swordfish | distribution outside Australia, New Zealand, Greece, Cyprus and Singapore only; co-production with Village Roadshow Pictures, NPV Entertainment and Silver Pictures |
| June 29, 2001 | A.I. Artificial Intelligence (Note: Skydance now owns worldwide rights to this film, having acquired Paramount Global in 2025 and Warner Bros. Discovery in 2026.) | worldwide theatrical and international home video distribution only; co-production with DreamWorks Pictures, Amblin Entertainment and Stanley Kubrick Productions |
| July 4, 2001 | Cats & Dogs | distribution outside Australia, New Zealand, Greece, Cyprus and Singapore only; co-production with Village Roadshow Pictures, NPV Entertainment, Mad Chance Productions and Zide/Perry Productions |
| August 10, 2001 | Osmosis Jones | co-production with Warner Bros. Feature Animation and Conundrum Entertainment |
| August 17, 2001 | American Outlaws | distribution in North and Latin America, the U.K., Ireland, France, Italy, Spain, Andorra, Hungary, Romania, Bulgaria, the Czech Republic, Slovakia, former Yugoslavia and Asia excluding Japan only; produced by Morgan Creek Productions |
| August 24, 2001 | Summer Catch | co-production with Tollin/Robbins Productions |
| September 7, 2001 | Rock Star | distribution outside France, Germany, Austria and Switzerland only; co-production with Bel-Air Entertainment and Maysville Pictures |
| September 28, 2001 | Hearts in Atlantis | distribution outside Australia, New Zealand, Greece, Cyprus and Singapore only; produced by Castle Rock Entertainment, Village Roadshow Pictures and NPV Entertainment |
| October 5, 2001 | Training Day | distribution outside Australia, New Zealand, Greece, Cyprus and Singapore only; co-production with Village Roadshow Pictures, NPV Entertainment and Outlaw Productions |
| October 26, 2001 | Thirteen Ghosts | North American distribution only; co-production with Columbia Pictures and Dark Castle Entertainment |
| November 9, 2001 | Heist | distribution in North and Latin America, the U.K., Ireland, France, Germany, Austria, Scandinavia, the Benelux, Italy and India with Morgan Creek Productions only; produced by Franchise Pictures and Indelible Pictures |
| November 16, 2001 | Harry Potter and the Sorcerer's Stone | released as Harry Potter and the Philosopher's Stone outside the U.S.; co-production with Heyday Films, 1492 Pictures and Duncan Henderson Productions |
| November 30, 2001 | The Affair of the Necklace | distribution in North and Latin America, the U.K., Ireland, Australia, New Zealand, France and Italy only; produced by Alcon Entertainment |
| December 7, 2001 | Ocean's Eleven | distribution outside Australia, New Zealand, Greece, Cyprus and Singapore only; co-production with Village Roadshow Pictures, NPV Entertainment, Jerry Weintraub Productions and Section Eight Productions |
| December 19, 2001 | The Lord of the Rings: The Fellowship of the Ring | Nominee of the Academy Award for Best Picture; Nominee of the Golden Globe Award for Best Motion Picture – Drama distribution in Germany, Austria, Switzerland, Eastern Europe, Russia, Latin America excluding Mexico and select Asian territories including India only; produced by New Line Cinema and WingNut Films |
| December 21, 2001 | The Majestic | distribution outside Australia, New Zealand, Greece, Cyprus and Singapore only; produced by Castle Rock Entertainment, Village Roadshow Pictures, NPV Entertainment and Darkwoods Productions |
| December 28, 2001 | Charlotte Gray | North American distribution only; produced by FilmFour, Senator Film, Ecosse Films and Pod Film |

== 2002 ==
| Release Date | Title | Notes |
|---|---|---|
| January 25, 2002 | A Walk to Remember (Note: Co-owned by Vine Alternative Investments, with distribution rights currently licensed to Resurgence Media Group and Shout! Studios) | North American distribution only; produced by Pandora, Gaylord Films (uncredited), and Di Novi Pictures |
| February 8, 2002 | Collateral Damage | distribution outside France, Germany, Austria and Switzerland only; co-production with Bel-Air Entertainment |
| February 22, 2002 | Queen of the Damned | distribution outside Australia, New Zealand, Greece, Cyprus and Singapore only; co-production with Village Roadshow Pictures, NPV Entertainment and Material Pictures |
| March 8, 2002 | The Time Machine | international distribution only; co-production with DreamWorks Pictures, Parkes, MacDonald Productions and Arnold Leibovit Entertainment |
| March 15, 2002 | Showtime | distribution outside Australia, New Zealand, Greece, Cyprus and Singapore only; co-production with Village Roadshow Pictures, NPV Entertainment, Material Pictures and Tribeca Productions |
| March 29, 2002 | Death to Smoochy | distribution outside the U.K. and Ireland only; produced by FilmFour, Senator International and Mad Chance Productions |
| April 19, 2002 | Murder by Numbers | distribution only; produced by Castle Rock Entertainment and Schroeder/Hoffman Productions |
| April 26, 2002 | The Salton Sea | distribution only; produced by Castle Rock Entertainment, Darkwoods Productions and Humble Journey Films |
| May 24, 2002 | Insomnia | North American, French, German and Austrian distribution only; produced by Alcon Entertainment, Witt/Thomas Productions and Section Eight Productions |
| June 7, 2002 | Divine Secrets of the Ya-Ya Sisterhood | co-production with Gaylord Films and All Girl Productions |
| June 14, 2002 | Scooby-Doo | co-production with Hanna-Barbera Productions, Mosaic Media Group and Atlas Entertainment |
| June 21, 2002 | Juwanna Mann | distribution outside Australia, New Zealand, South Africa, Scandinavia and Poland only; produced by Morgan Creek Productions |
| July 3, 2002 | The Powerpuff Girls Movie | distribution only; produced by Cartoon Network Studios |
| July 19, 2002 | Eight Legged Freaks | distribution outside Australia, New Zealand, Greece, Cyprus and Singapore only; co-production with Village Roadshow Pictures, NPV Entertainment and Electric Entertainment |
| August 9, 2002 | Blood Work | co-production with Malpaso Productions |
| August 16, 2002 | The Adventures of Pluto Nash | distribution outside Australia, New Zealand, Greece, Cyprus and Singapore only; produced by Castle Rock Entertainment, Village Roadshow Pictures, NPV Entertainment and Bregman Productions |
| August 16, 2002 | Possession | international distribution only; co-production with USA Films, Baltimore Spring Creek Pictures and Contagious Films |
| August 30, 2002 | FeardotCom (Note: Distribution rights co-owned by Resurgence Media Group) | North American distribution with Franchise Pictures only; produced by MDP Worldwide, ApolloMedia, Fear.Com Productions and Carousel Film Company |
| September 6, 2002 | City by the Sea | North American, U.K. and Irish distribution only; produced by Franchise Pictures and Brad Grey Pictures |
| September 20, 2002 | Ballistic: Ecks vs. Sever | North American, U.K., Irish, Australian and New Zealand distribution only; produced by Franchise Pictures and Chris Lee Productions |
| October 11, 2002 | White Oleander | North American distribution only; co-production with Pandora, Gaylord Films (uncredited) and John Wells Productions |
| October 18, 2002 | Welcome to Collinwood | North American distribution only; co-production with Pandora, Gaylord Films (uncredited), H5B5 Media AG and Section Eight Productions |
| October 25, 2002 | Ghost Ship | distribution outside Australia, New Zealand, Greece, Cyprus and Singapore only; co-production with Village Roadshow Pictures, NPV Entertainment and Dark Castle Entertainment |
| November 6, 2002 | Femme Fatale (Note: Owned by StudioCanal) | North American, U.K., Irish, Australian, New Zealand and Scandinavian distribution only; produced by Quinta Communications and Epsilon Motion Pictures |
| November 15, 2002 | Harry Potter and the Chamber of Secrets | co-production with Heyday Films and 1492 Pictures |
| December 6, 2002 | Analyze That | distribution outside Australia, New Zealand, Greece, Cyprus and Singapore only; co-production with Village Roadshow Pictures, NPV Entertainment, Baltimore Spring Creek Pictures, Face Productions and Tribeca Productions |
| December 18, 2002 | The Lord of the Rings: The Two Towers | Nominee of the Academy Award for Best Picture; Nominee of the Golden Globe Award for Best Motion Picture – Drama distribution in Germany, Austria, Switzerland, Eastern Europe, Russia, Latin America excluding Mexico and select Asian territories including India only; produced by New Line Cinema and WingNut Films |
| December 20, 2002 | Two Weeks Notice | distribution outside Australia, New Zealand, Greece, Cyprus and Singapore only; produced by Castle Rock Entertainment, Village Roadshow Pictures, NPV Entertainment and Fortis Films |

== 2003 ==
| Release Date | Title | Notes |
|---|---|---|
| January 17, 2003 | Kangaroo Jack | distribution only; produced by Castle Rock Entertainment and Jerry Bruckheimer Films |
| February 21, 2003 | Gods and Generals | distribution only; produced by Ted Turner Pictures and Antietam Filmworks |
| February 28, 2003 | Cradle 2 the Grave | co-production with Silver Pictures |
| March 21, 2003 | Dreamcatcher | distribution outside Australia, New Zealand, Greece, Cyprus and Singapore only; produced by Castle Rock Entertainment, Village Roadshow Pictures, NPV Entertainment and Kasdan Pictures |
| March 28, 2003 | Blue Collar Comedy Tour: The Movie | distribution only; produced by Pandora, Gaylord Films and Parallel Entertainment |
| April 4, 2003 | What a Girl Wants | co-production with Gaylord Films, Di Novi Pictures and Gerber Pictures |
| April 16, 2003 | A Mighty Wind | distribution only; produced by Castle Rock Entertainment |
| April 18, 2003 | Malibu's Most Wanted | co-production with Karz Entertainment |
| May 15, 2003 | The Matrix Reloaded | distribution outside Australia, New Zealand, Greece, Cyprus and Singapore only; co-production with Village Roadshow Pictures, NPV Entertainment and Silver Pictures |
| May 23, 2003 | The In-Laws | North American, U.K. and Irish distribution only; produced by Franchise Pictures, Gerber Pictures and Furthur Films |
| June 20, 2003 | Alex & Emma | North American, U.K. and Irish distribution only; produced by Franchise Pictures and Escape Artists |
| July 2, 2003 | Terminator 3: Rise of the Machines (Note: Currently owned by Sony Pictures (via Columbia Pictures), which also distributed in most international territories) | North American distribution only; produced by Intermedia Films, IMF, C2 Pictures and Mostow/Lieberman Productions |
| August 1, 2003 | I'll Be There | distribution outside Australia, New Zealand, South Africa, Scandinavia and Poland only; produced by Morgan Creek Productions |
| August 15, 2003 | Grind | North American distribution only; produced by Pandora, Gaylord Films, Gerber Pictures and 900 Films |
| September 12, 2003 | Matchstick Men | co-production with ImageMovers, Scott Free Productions, Rickshaw Productions and LivePlanet |
| October 15, 2003 | Mystic River | Nominee of the Academy Award for Best Picture; Nominee of the Golden Globe Award for Best Motion Picture – Drama distribution outside Australia, New Zealand, Greece, Cyprus and Singapore only; co-production with Malpaso Productions, Village Roadshow Pictures and NPV Entertainment |
| November 5, 2003 | The Matrix Revolutions | distribution outside Australia, New Zealand, Greece, Cyprus and Singapore only; co-production with Village Roadshow Pictures, NPV Entertainment and Silver Pictures |
| November 14, 2003 | Looney Tunes: Back in Action | co-production with Warner Bros. Feature Animation, Baltimore/Cold Spring Creek Pictures and Goldmann Pictures |
| November 21, 2003 | Gothika | North American and Japanese distribution only; co-production with Columbia Pictures and Dark Castle Entertainment |
| December 5, 2003 | The Last Samurai | co-production with Radar Pictures, The Bedford Falls Company and Cruise/Wagner Productions |
| December 12, 2003 | Love Don't Cost a Thing | distribution only; produced by Alcon Entertainment |
| December 12, 2003 | Something's Gotta Give | international distribution only; co-production with Columbia Pictures and Waverly Films |
| December 17, 2003 | The Lord of the Rings: The Return of the King | Winner of the Academy Award for Best Picture; Winner of the Golden Globe Award for Best Motion Picture – Drama distribution in Germany, Austria, Switzerland, Eastern Europe, Russia, Latin America excluding Mexico and select Asian territories including India only; produced by New Line Cinema and WingNut Films |

== 2004 ==
| Release Date | Title | Notes |
|---|---|---|
| January 9, 2004 | Chasing Liberty | distribution only; produced by Alcon Entertainment and Trademark Films |
| January 16, 2004 | Torque | distribution outside Australia, New Zealand, Greece, Cyprus and Singapore only; co-production with Village Roadshow Pictures and Original Film |
| January 30, 2004 | The Big Bounce | distribution only; produced by Shangri-La Entertainment and Material Films |
| February 20, 2004 | Clifford's Really Big Movie | distribution only; produced by Scholastic Entertainment and Big Red Dog Productions |
| March 3, 2004 | NASCAR 3D: The IMAX Experience | co-production with IMAX |
| March 5, 2004 | Starsky & Hutch | North American distribution only; co-production with Dimension Films, AR-TL, Richie-Ludwig Productions, Weed Road Pictures and Red Hour Productions |
| March 12, 2004 | Spartan | North American, U.K. and Irish distribution only; produced by Franchise Pictures, Apollomedia, Quality International and Signature Pictures |
| March 19, 2004 | Taking Lives | distribution outside Australia, New Zealand, Greece, Cyprus and Singapore only; co-production with Village Roadshow Pictures and Atmosphere Pictures |
| March 26, 2004 | Scooby-Doo 2: Monsters Unleashed | co-production with Hanna-Barbera Productions and Mosaic Media Group |
| April 9, 2004 | The Whole Ten Yards | North American, U.K., Irish and French distribution only; produced by Franchise Pictures and Cheyenne Enterprises |
| May 7, 2004 | New York Minute | co-production with Dualstar Productions and Di Novi Pictures |
| May 14, 2004 | Troy | co-production with Radiant Productions and Plan B Entertainment |
| June 4, 2004 | Harry Potter and the Prisoner of Azkaban | co-production with Heyday Films and 1492 Pictures |
| July 16, 2004 | A Cinderella Story | co-production with Dylan Sellers Productions and Clifford Werber Productions |
| July 23, 2004 | Catwoman | distribution outside Australia, New Zealand, Greece, Cyprus and Singapore only; co-production with Village Roadshow Pictures and Di Novi Pictures |
| August 13, 2004 | Yu-Gi-Oh! The Movie: Pyramid of Light (Note: Owned by Konami, with U.S. distribution rights owned by Cineverse and internationally by Sony Pictures via Crunchyroll) | distribution outside Asia only; produced by 4Kids Entertainment and Studio Gallop |
| August 20, 2004 | Exorcist: The Beginning | distribution in North and Latin America, the U.K., Ireland, South Africa, France, Germany, Austria, Spain, Andorra, Hungary, Romania, Bulgaria, the Czech Republic, Slovakia, former Yugoslavia and Asia excluding Japan only; produced by Morgan Creek Productions |
| September 17, 2004 | Funky Monkey | distribution only; produced by Franchise Pictures |
| November 10, 2004 | The Polar Express | distribution only; produced by Castle Rock Entertainment, Shangri-La Entertainment, Playtone, ImageMovers and Golden Mean Productions |
| November 24, 2004 | Alexander | distribution in North and Latin America, the U.K., Ireland, Australia, New Zealand, South Africa and Italy only; produced by Intermedia Films, IMF Productions, Moritz Borman Productions and Ixtlan |
| December 10, 2004 | Ocean's Twelve | distribution outside Australia, New Zealand, Greece, Cyprus and Singapore only; co-production with Village Roadshow Pictures, Jerry Weintraub Productions and Section Eight Productions |
| December 15, 2004 | Million Dollar Baby | Winner of the Academy Award for Best Picture; Nominee of the Golden Globe Award for Best Motion Picture – Drama; North American and South African distribution only; co-production with Lakeshore Entertainment, Malpaso Productions and Ruddy Morgan Organization |
| December 25, 2004 | The Aviator | Nominee of the Academy Award for Best Picture; Winner of the Golden Globe Award for Best Motion Picture – Drama distribution in the U.S. on home media, Canada, Latin America, Australia, New Zealand, South Africa and China only; co-acquisition with Miramax Films; produced by Initial Entertainment Group, Forward Pass, Appian Way Productions and IMF Productions |

== 2005 ==
| Release Date | Title | Notes |
|---|---|---|
| January 14, 2005 | Racing Stripes | North American distribution only; produced by Alcon Entertainment |
| January 21, 2005 | The Phantom of the Opera | Nominee of the Golden Globe Award for Best Motion Picture – Musical or Comedy; North American distribution only; produced by Odyssey Entertainment, Really Useful Films and Scion Films |
| February 18, 2005 | Constantine | distribution outside Australia, New Zealand, Greece, Cyprus and Singapore only; co-production with Village Roadshow Pictures, The Donners' Company, Batfilm Productions, Weed Road Pictures and 3 Arts Entertainment |
| March 24, 2005 | Miss Congeniality 2: Armed and Fabulous | distribution outside Australia, New Zealand, Greece, Cyprus and Singapore only; produced by Castle Rock Entertainment, Village Roadshow Pictures and Fortis Films |
| May 6, 2005 | House of Wax | distribution outside Australia, New Zealand, Greece, Cyprus and Singapore only; co-production with Village Roadshow Pictures and Dark Castle Entertainment |
| May 20, 2005 | Dominion: Prequel to the Exorcist | distribution in North and Latin America, the U.K., Ireland, France, Germany, Austria, Spain, Andorra, Eastern Europe and Asia only; produced by Morgan Creek Productions |
| June 1, 2005 | The Sisterhood of the Traveling Pants | distribution only; produced by Alcon Entertainment, Di Novi Pictures, Martin Chase Productions and Alloy Entertainment |
| June 15, 2005 | Batman Begins | co-production with Legendary Pictures, DC Comics and Syncopy Inc. |
| July 15, 2005 | Charlie and the Chocolate Factory | distribution outside Australia, New Zealand, Greece, Cyprus and Singapore only; co-production with Village Roadshow Pictures, The Zanuck Company, Plan B Entertainment and Theobald Film Productions |
| July 22, 2005 | The Island | international distribution only; co-production with DreamWorks Pictures and Parkes/MacDonald Productions |
| July 29, 2005 | Must Love Dogs | co-production with Ubu Productions and Team Todd |
| August 5, 2005 | The Dukes of Hazzard | distribution outside Australia, New Zealand, Greece, Cyprus and Singapore only; co-production with Village Roadshow Pictures and Gerber Pictures |
| September 2, 2005 | A Sound of Thunder | North American, U.K. and Irish distribution only; produced by Franchise Pictures, Apollomedia, QI Quality International, Crusader Entertainment and Baldwin Entertainment Group |
| September 23, 2005 | Corpse Bride | co-production with Tim Burton Productions and Laika Entertainment |
| September 30, 2005 | Duma | co-production with Gaylord Films and John Wells Productions |
| October 21, 2005 | North Country | co-production with Participant Productions, Industry Entertainment and Nick Wechsler Productions |
| November 11, 2005 | Kiss Kiss Bang Bang | distribution only; produced by Silver Pictures |
| November 18, 2005 | Harry Potter and the Goblet of Fire | co-production with Heyday Films |
| December 9, 2005 | Syriana | co-production with Participant Productions, Section Eight Productions and 4M Productions |
| December 25, 2005 | Rumor Has It… | distribution outside Australia, New Zealand, Greece, Cyprus and Singapore only; co-production with Village Roadshow Pictures, Section Eight Productions and Spring Creek Pictures |

== 2006 ==
| Release Date | Title | Notes |
|---|---|---|
| February 10, 2006 | Firewall | distribution outside Australia, New Zealand, Greece, Cyprus and Singapore only; co-production with Village Roadshow Pictures, Beacon Pictures and Thunder Road Films |
| March 3, 2006 | Deep Sea | co-production with IMAX |
| March 3, 2006 | 16 Blocks | distribution in North America, the U.K., Ireland, South Africa, Germany and Austria only; produced by Millennium Films, Emmett/Furla Films, Cheyenne Enterprises, Equity Pictures, Nu Image Entertainment and The Donners' Company; co-distributed by Alcon Entertainment in North America |
| March 17, 2006 | V for Vendetta | co-production with Virtual Studios, Silver Pictures, Vertigo (DC Comics) and Anarchos Productions |
| March 31, 2006 | ATL | co-production with Overbrook Entertainment |
| May 12, 2006 | Poseidon | co-production with Virtual Studios, Weed Road Pictures, Radiant Productions, Next Entertainment, Irwin Allen Productions and Synthesis Entertainment |
| June 16, 2006 | The Lake House | distribution outside Australia, New Zealand, Greece, Cyprus and Singapore only; co-production with Village Roadshow Pictures and Vertigo Entertainment |
| June 28, 2006 | Superman Returns | co-production with Legendary Pictures, DC Comics, Peters Entertainment and Bad Hat Harry Productions |
| July 21, 2006 | Lady in the Water | co-production with Legendary Pictures and Blinding Edge Pictures |
| July 28, 2006 | The Ant Bully | co-production with Legendary Pictures, Playtone and DNA Productions |
| August 25, 2006 | Beerfest | co-production with Legendary Pictures, Gerber Pictures, Cataland Films and Broken Lizard |
| September 1, 2006 | The Wicker Man | North American, German and Austrian distribution only; produced by Millennium Films, Saturn Films, Emmett/Furla Films, Equity Pictures and Nu Image Entertainment; co-distributed by Alcon Entertainment in North America |
| October 6, 2006 | The Departed | Winner of the Academy Award for Best Picture; Nominee of the Golden Globe Award for Best Motion Picture – Drama distribution outside the U.K., Ireland, France, French-speaking Belgium, Italy, the CIS, Hong Kong and Taiwan only; co-production with Plan B Entertainment, Initial Entertainment Group, Vertigo Entertainment and Media Asia Films |
| October 20, 2006 | The Prestige | international distribution outside Japan only; co-production with Touchstone Pictures, Newmarket Films and Syncopy Inc. |
| October 20, 2006 | Flags of Our Fathers | international distribution only; co-production with DreamWorks Pictures, Malpaso Productions and Amblin Entertainment; distributed in North America by Paramount Pictures |
| November 17, 2006 | Happy Feet | Winner of the Academy Award for Best Animated Feature; Nominee of the Golden Globe Award for Best Animated Feature Film distribution outside Australia, New Zealand, Greece, Cyprus and Singapore only; co-production with Village Roadshow Pictures, Kennedy Miller Productions and Animal Logic |
| November 22, 2006 | The Fountain | North American distribution only; co-production with Regency Enterprises, Protozoa Pictures, New Regency Productions and Foy, Inc. |
| December 8, 2006 | Blood Diamond | co-production with Virtual Studios, Spring Creek Pictures, Bedford Falls Productions and Initial Entertainment Group |
| December 8, 2006 | Unaccompanied Minors | distribution outside Australia and New Zealand only; co-production with Village Roadshow Pictures and The Donners' Company |
| December 15, 2006 | The Good German | co-production with Virtual Studios and Section Eight Productions |
| December 20, 2006 | Letters from Iwo Jima | Nominee of the Academy Award for Best Picture co-production with DreamWorks Pictures, Malpaso Productions and Amblin Entertainment |
| December 22, 2006 | We Are Marshall | co-production with Legendary Pictures, Thunder Road Films and Wonderland Sound and Vision |

== 2007 ==
| Release Date | Title | Notes |
|---|---|---|
| February 14, 2007 | Music and Lyrics | distribution outside Australia, New Zealand, Greece, Cyprus and Singapore only; produced by Castle Rock Entertainment, Village Roadshow Pictures and Reserve Room |
| February 23, 2007 | The Astronaut Farmer | North American, U.K. and Irish distribution only; produced by Spring Creek Pictures and Polish Brothers Construction |
| March 2, 2007 | Zodiac | international distribution only; co-production with Paramount Pictures and Phoenix Pictures |
| March 9, 2007 | 300 | co-production with Legendary Pictures, Virtual Studios, Atmosphere Pictures MM and Hollywood Gang Films |
| March 23, 2007 | TMNT | distribution in North America, the U.K., Ireland, France, Italy, Spain, Andorra, the Benelux, Japan and China only; produced by Imagi Animation Studios; international distribution by The Weinstein Company |
| April 5, 2007 | The Reaping | distribution outside Australia, New Zealand, Greece, Cyprus and Singapore only; co-production with Village Roadshow Pictures and Dark Castle Entertainment |
| April 20, 2007 | In the Land of Women | North American, U.K. and Irish distribution only; produced by Castle Rock Entertainment and Anonymous Content; |
| May 4, 2007 | Lucky You | distribution outside Australia, New Zealand, Greece, Cyprus and Singapore only; co-production with Village Roadshow Pictures, Deuce Three Productions and Di Novi Pictures |
| June 8, 2007 | Ocean's Thirteen | distribution outside Australia, New Zealand, Greece, Cyprus and Singapore only; co-production with Village Roadshow Pictures, Jerry Weintraub Productions and Section Eight Productions |
| June 15, 2007 | Nancy Drew | co-production with Virtual Studios and Jerry Weintraub Productions |
| July 3, 2007 | License to Wed | distribution outside Australia, New Zealand, Greece, Cyprus and Singapore only; co-production with Village Roadshow Pictures, Robert Simonds Productions, Phoenix Pictures, Underground Films and Management and Proposal Productions |
| July 11, 2007 | Harry Potter and the Order of the Phoenix | co-production with Heyday Films |
| July 27, 2007 | No Reservations | distribution outside Australia, New Zealand, Greece, Cyprus and Singapore only; produced by Castle Rock Entertainment and Village Roadshow Pictures |
| August 17, 2007 | The Invasion | distribution outside Australia, New Zealand, Greece, Cyprus and Singapore only; co-production with Village Roadshow Pictures, Silver Pictures and Vertigo Entertainment |
| September 14, 2007 | The Brave One | distribution outside Australia, New Zealand, Greece, Cyprus and Singapore only; co-production with Village Roadshow Pictures and Silver Pictures |
| September 21, 2007 | The Assassination of Jesse James by the Coward Robert Ford | co-production with Virtual Studios, Scott Free Productions and Plan B Entertainment |
| October 12, 2007 | Michael Clayton | Nominee of the Academy Award for Best Picture; Nominee of the Golden Globe Award for Best Motion Picture – Drama; North American distribution only; produced by Samuels Media, Castle Rock Entertainment, Mirage Enterprises and Section Eight Productions |
| October 26, 2007 | Rails & Ties | distribution only; produced by Malpaso Productions |
| November 9, 2007 | Fred Claus | co-production with Silver Pictures, David Dobkin Pictures and Jessie Nelson Productions |
| November 16, 2007 | Beowulf | international distribution only; produced by Shangri-La Entertainment and ImageMovers; distributed in North America by Paramount Pictures |
| November 21, 2007 | August Rush | North American distribution only; co-production with Southpaw Entertainment, Odyssey Entertainment and CJ Entertainment |
| December 14, 2007 | I Am Legend | distribution outside Australia, New Zealand, Greece, Cyprus and Singapore only; co-production with Village Roadshow Pictures, Heyday Films, Weed Road Pictures, Overbrook Entertainment and Original Film |
| December 21, 2007 | P.S. I Love You | North American distribution only; produced by Alcon Entertainment, Wendy Finerman Productions and Grosvenor Park Productions |
| December 21, 2007 | Sweeney Todd: The Demon Barber of Fleet Street | Winner of the Golden Globe Award for Best Motion Picture – Musical or Comedy international distribution only; co-production with DreamWorks Pictures, Parkes/MacDonald Productions and The Zanuck Company; distributed in North America by Paramount Pictures |
| December 21, 2007 | Mama's Boy | North American, Australian and New Zealand distribution only; produced by Carr-Santelli Productions |
| December 25, 2007 | The Bucket List | co-production with Zadan/Meron Productions |

== 2008 ==
| Release Date | Title | Notes |
|---|---|---|
| January 4, 2008 | One Missed Call | distribution outside Japan only; produced by Alcon Entertainment, Kadokawa Pictures, Equity Pictures and Intermedia Films |
| February 8, 2008 | Fool's Gold | co-production with De Line Pictures and Bernie Goldmann Productions |
| March 7, 2008 | 10,000 B.C. | co-production with Legendary Pictures, Centropolis Entertainment and The Mark Gordon Company (uncredited) |
| April 11, 2008 | Chaos Theory | North American distribution only; produced by Castle Rock Entertainment, Lone Star Film Group and Frederic Golchan Productions |
| April 25, 2008 | Harold & Kumar Escape from Guantanamo Bay | distribution in the U.S., South Africa, Germany, Austria, Switzerland, Eastern Europe, the CIS and Singapore only; produced by New Line Cinema and Mandate Pictures |
| May 9, 2008 | Speed Racer | distribution outside Australia, New Zealand, Greece, Cyprus and Singapore only; co-production with Village Roadshow Pictures, Silver Pictures and Anarchos Productions |
| May 30, 2008 | Sex and the City | distribution in the U.S., Chile, South Africa, Germany, Austria, Switzerland, Eastern Europe, the Baltics, the CIS, India, Singapore and Thailand only; produced by New Line Cinema and HBO Films |
| June 20, 2008 | Get Smart | distribution outside Australia, New Zealand, Greece, Cyprus and Singapore only; co-production with Village Roadshow Pictures, Mosaic Media Group, Mad Chance Productions and Callahan Filmworks |
| July 2, 2008 | Kit Kittredge: An American Girl | U.S., Italian and Spanish distribution only; produced by Picturehouse, New Line Cinema, HBO Films and American Girl Films |
| July 11, 2008 | Journey to the Center of the Earth | distribution in the U.S., Chile, Germany, Austria, Switzerland, the Benelux, Eastern Europe, the Baltics, the CIS, China and Singapore only; produced by New Line Cinema and Walden Media |
| July 18, 2008 | The Dark Knight | co-production with Legendary Pictures, DC Comics and Syncopy Inc. Inducted into the National Film Registry in 2020 |
| August 6, 2008 | The Sisterhood of the Traveling Pants 2 | distribution only; produced by Alcon Entertainment, Di Novi Pictures, Martin Chase Productions and Alloy Entertainment |
| August 15, 2008 | Star Wars: The Clone Wars (Note: Owned by Disney (via Lucasfilm Ltd.)) | distribution only; produced by Lucasfilm and Lucasfilm Animation |
| September 12, 2008 | The Women | U.S. co-distribution with New Line Cinema only; produced by Picturehouse, Inferno Distribution, Double Edged Entertainment, Jagged Films and Shukovsky English Entertainment |
| September 26, 2008 | Nights in Rodanthe | distribution outside Australia, New Zealand and Singapore theatrically only; co-production with Village Roadshow Pictures and Di Novi Pictures |
| October 3, 2008 | Appaloosa | distribution in the U.S., South Africa, Germany, Austria, Switzerland, Eastern Europe, the CIS and Singapore only; produced by New Line Cinema, Axiom Films and Groundswell Productions |
| October 10, 2008 | Body of Lies | co-production with Scott Free Productions and De Line Pictures |
| October 24, 2008 | Pride and Glory | distribution in the U.S., Chile, South Africa, Germany, Austria, Switzerland, Eastern Europe, the Baltics, the CIS, Japan and Singapore only; produced by New Line Cinema, Solaris Entertainment, O'Connor Brothers and Avery Pix |
| October 31, 2008 | RocknRolla | distribution outside France only; produced by Dark Castle Entertainment and Toff Guy Films |
| November 12, 2008 | Slumdog Millionaire | Winner of the Academy Award for Best Picture; Winner of the Golden Globe Award for Best Motion Picture – Drama; North American and Chinese co-distribution with Fox Searchlight Pictures only; produced by Film4 Productions and Celador Films |
| November 26, 2008 | Four Christmases | distribution in the U.S., Chile, Germany, Austria, Switzerland, Italy, the Benelux, Eastern Europe, the Baltics, the CIS, Turkey, India, Hong Kong, Japan and Singapore only; produced by New Line Cinema and Spyglass Entertainment |
| December 12, 2008 | Gran Torino | distribution outside Australia, New Zealand, Greece, Cyprus and Singapore theatrically only; co-production with Village Roadshow Pictures, Double Nickel Entertainment and Malpaso Productions |
| December 19, 2008 | Yes Man | distribution outside Australia, New Zealand, Greece, Cyprus and Singapore theatrically only; co-production with Village Roadshow Pictures, Heyday Films and The Zanuck Company |
| December 25, 2008 | The Curious Case of Benjamin Button | Nominee of the Academy Award for Best Picture; Nominee of the Golden Globe Award for Best Motion Picture – Drama international distribution only; co-production with Paramount Pictures and The Kennedy/Marshall Company |

== 2009 ==
| Release Date | Title | Notes |
|---|---|---|
| January 23, 2009 | Inkheart | distribution in the U.S., Chile, South Africa, Germany, Austria, Switzerland, Eastern Europe, the Baltics, the CIS, India and Singapore only; produced by New Line Cinema |
| February 6, 2009 | He's Just Not That into You | distribution in the U.S., Chile, Peru, Germany, Austria, Switzerland, Eastern Europe, the Baltics, the CIS, Turkey, Japan, India, Singapore and Thailand only; produced by New Line Cinema and Flower Films |
| February 13, 2009 | Friday the 13th | North American distribution only; produced by New Line Cinema, Paramount Pictures and Platinum Dunes |
| February 13, 2009 | Under the Sea | co-production with IMAX |
| March 6, 2009 | Watchmen | North American distribution only; co-production with Paramount Pictures, Legendary Pictures, DC Comics, Lawrence Gordon Productions, Lloyd Levin Productions and Cruel and Unusual Films |
| April 10, 2009 | Observe and Report | co-production with Legendary Pictures and De Line Pictures |
| April 17, 2009 | 17 Again | distribution outside Canada, Mexico, Brazil, Argentina, Colombia, Ecuador, Uruguay, Venezuela, the U.K., Ireland, Australia, New Zealand, France, Spain, Andorra, the Benelux, Portugal, the Nordics, Greece, Cyprus, the Middle East, Israel, Taiwan, Malaysia and the Philippines only; produced by New Line Cinema and Offspring Entertainment |
| May 1, 2009 | Ghosts of Girlfriends Past | distribution in the U.S., Mexico, Chile, Peru, Central America, South Africa, Germany, Austria, Switzerland, Italy, Eastern Europe, the Baltics, the CIS, Israel, Turkey and Asia excluding Taiwan and the Philippines only; produced by New Line Cinema |
| May 21, 2009 | Terminator Salvation | North American distribution only; produced by The Halcyon Company, Moritz Borman Productions and Wonderland Sound and Vision |
| June 5, 2009 | The Hangover | Winner of the Golden Globe Award for Best Motion Picture – Musical or Comedy co-production with Legendary Pictures and Green Hat Films |
| June 26, 2009 | My Sister's Keeper | distribution outside Brazil, Argentina, Colombia, Ecuador, Uruguay, Venezuela, the U.K., Ireland, Australia, New Zealand, France, Spain, Andorra, Scandinavia, Greece, Cyprus, Japan, Taiwan and the Philippines only; produced by New Line Cinema |
| July 15, 2009 | Harry Potter and the Half-Blood Prince | co-production with Heyday Films |
| July 24, 2009 | Orphan | distribution outside the U.K., Ireland, Germany and Austria only; produced by Dark Castle Entertainment and Appian Way Productions |
| August 14, 2009 | The Time Traveler's Wife | distribution in the U.S., Chile, Peru, Bolivia, Central America, Germany, Austria, Switzerland, the Benelux, Eastern Europe, the Baltics, the CIS, Turkey, India, Japan, Singapore and Thailand only; produced by New Line Cinema, Plan B Entertainment and Nick Wechsler Productions |
| August 21, 2009 | Shorts | co-production with Imagenation Abu Dhabi, Media Rights Capital and Troublemaker Studios |
| August 28, 2009 | The Final Destination | distribution outside Brazil, Argentina, Colombia, Ecuador, Uruguay, Venezuela, the U.K., Ireland, Australia, New Zealand, France, Spain, Andorra, Scandinavia, Greece, Cyprus, Japan, Taiwan and the Philippines only; produced by New Line Cinema, Practical Pictures and Zide/Perry Productions |
| September 11, 2009 | Whiteout | distribution outside the U.K., Ireland and France only; produced by Dark Castle Entertainment |
| September 18, 2009 | The Informant! | co-production with Participant Media, Groundswell Productions, Section Eight Productions and Jaffe/Braunstein Enterprises |
| October 2, 2009 | The Invention of Lying | North American distribution only; produced by Radar Pictures, Media Rights Capital and Lynda Obst Productions |
| October 6, 2009 | Trick 'r Treat | distribution only; produced by Legendary Pictures and Bad Hat Harry Productions |
| October 16, 2009 | Where the Wild Things Are | distribution outside Australia, New Zealand, Greece, Cyprus and Singapore theatrically only; co-production with Legendary Pictures, Village Roadshow Pictures and Playtone |
| November 6, 2009 | The Box | North American distribution only; produced by Radar Pictures, Media Rights Capital and Darko Entertainment |
| November 20, 2009 | The Blind Side | Nominee of the Academy Award for Best Picture distribution only; produced by Alcon Entertainment and Gil Netter Productions |
| November 25, 2009 | Ninja Assassin | distribution outside France only; co-production with Legendary Pictures, Dark Castle Entertainment, Silver Pictures and Anarchos Productions |
| December 11, 2009 | Invictus | co-production with Spyglass Entertainment, Revelations Entertainment, Mace Neufeld Productions and Malpaso Productions |
| December 25, 2009 | Sherlock Holmes | distribution outside Australia, New Zealand, Greece, Cyprus and Singapore theatrically only; co-production with Village Roadshow Pictures, Silver Pictures and Wigram Productions |

== See also ==
- List of Warner Bros. International films (2000–2009)
- List of New Line Cinema films
- List of films based on DC Comics publications
- List of Warner Bros. theatrical animated feature films
- Category:Lists of films by studio
