= Catherine Hyde =

Catherine Hyde may refer to:

- Catherine Ryan Hyde (born 1955), American novelist and short story writer
- Catherine Hyde, Duchess of Queensbury (1701-1777), English socialite
