= Pay It Forward (novel) =

1999 novel by Catherine Ryan Hyde

- First edition
- Author: Catherine Ryan Hyde
- Illustrator: Laurent Linn
- Language: English
- Subject: Fiction, romance
- Publisher: Simon & Schuster
- Publication date: 1999
- Media type: Print
- Pages: 261 pages
- Awards: "Best Books for Young Readers" in 2001
- ISBN: 978-143-917040-3 (Additional ISBNs: 0-7432-0389-5, 978-0-7432-0389-0, 978-1-4481-2699-6, 978-1-4767-9638-3, 978-1-4711-0532-6)

Pay It Forward is a novel by Catherine Ryan Hyde, released in 1999 which was adapted into the motion picture Pay It Forward which released theatrically and to DVD in 2000–2001. A Young Reader's Edition adapted specifically for middle school students was released in 2014. The novel has been translated into 20 languages for publication in more than thirty countries and was chosen among the Best Books for Young Adults in 2001 by the American Library Association.

== Plot summary ==
When 12-year-old Trevor McKinney begins seventh grade in Atascadero, California, his social studies teacher, Reuben St Clair, gives the class an assignment to devise and put into action a plan that will change the world for the better. Trevor's plan is a charitable program based on the networking of good deeds. He calls his plan "Pay It Forward", which means the recipient of a favor does a favor for three others. However, it needs to be a major favor that the receiver cannot complete themselves.

Trevor first begins by helping Jerry, a jobless man who was unable to find a home. However, he seemingly forgets to complete three favors and ends up in prison. Next, Trevor directly helps Mr. St. Clair. Finally, he helps Mrs. Greenberg, who eventually dies. However, without Trevor's knowledge, Mrs. Greenberg had helped three friends by giving them $8,333 in her will. One of them, Matt, meets an injured gangster in an alleyway, named Sidney G. Matt told him about Pay It Forward but told him not to do it. After helping the man, it turns out that gangster helped another man, who also spared the life of his lifetime rival as his favor. Trevor dies after being stabbed by a skinhead whose companions were assaulting two gay men, Gordie and Sandy.

Seeing the chain, Chris Chandler, a reporter, connects the dots and finds Trevor. Even further, Trevor's mother, whose father had left, strikes up a relationship with Mr. St. Clair, and Jerry is heard from again, helping a lady not to commit suicide. The novel details how Trevor's "Pay It Forward" attempts are successful or not successful and how some of the "Pay It Forward" chains result in happenings such as Trevor meeting the President, and Trevor's untimely death, which was made by one last person to help in his Pay It Forward 'project' which soon turned into "The Movement".

== Differences from the film ==
The primary differences are related to setting and character. Instead of the mother being a down-and-out recovering alcoholic in Las Vegas, Nevada, the original story was based in Atascadero, California, a city not far from the home of Catherine Ryan Hyde.

The teacher's burns, rather than being inflicted by his father, are the result of napalm wounds suffered during service, presumably during the Vietnam War. Trevor's discovery comes from a different source (dropping crime rates in one of the state prisons) and that Trevor's story draws enough attention for him to get to meet the President of the United States before his death near Washington, DC area. The conclusion of the book draws from Arlene McKinney and Mr. St. Clair's continuing relationship and an act of their own "paying it forward".

Several of the characters from the book are combined. The character of Eugene Simonet (originally Reuben St. Clair) was African-American in the novel; in the film, he was portrayed by the white actor Kevin Spacey.

In the novel, unlike the film, Trevor goes to the president for his project.
