= Atascadero Lake =

- Location within California Location within the United States
- Location: San Luis Obispo County, California
- Coordinates: 35.4646574°N 120.6665377°W
- Type: reservoir
- Surface area: 0.12 km^{2} (0.05 sq mi)
- Settlements: Atascadero, California

Atascadero Lake is a 30-acre reservoir (12 ha) in San Luis Obispo County, California, United States. Along with Parole Canyon, it is one of two major drainages of the Atascadero Creek - Mid Salinas watershed.

The lake’s total capacity is 210 acre-feet (68 million gallons). The runoff from the lake is spilling into the overflow channel, which leads into Atascadero Creek.

== Statistics ==
Maximum Depth: 13 Feet

Average Depth: 6.85 Feet

Maximum Volume: 68,100,000 Gallons

=== Notable Events ===
Date	Capacity	Notes
1962		Lake scraped to further enlarge and deepen the basin, and this sediment was used to create the island.
2015-09-01	0%	Goats able to graze the lakebed.
2017-02-09	100%	Overflowing into spillway.
2023-03-26	100%	
