= Aristide Petrilli =

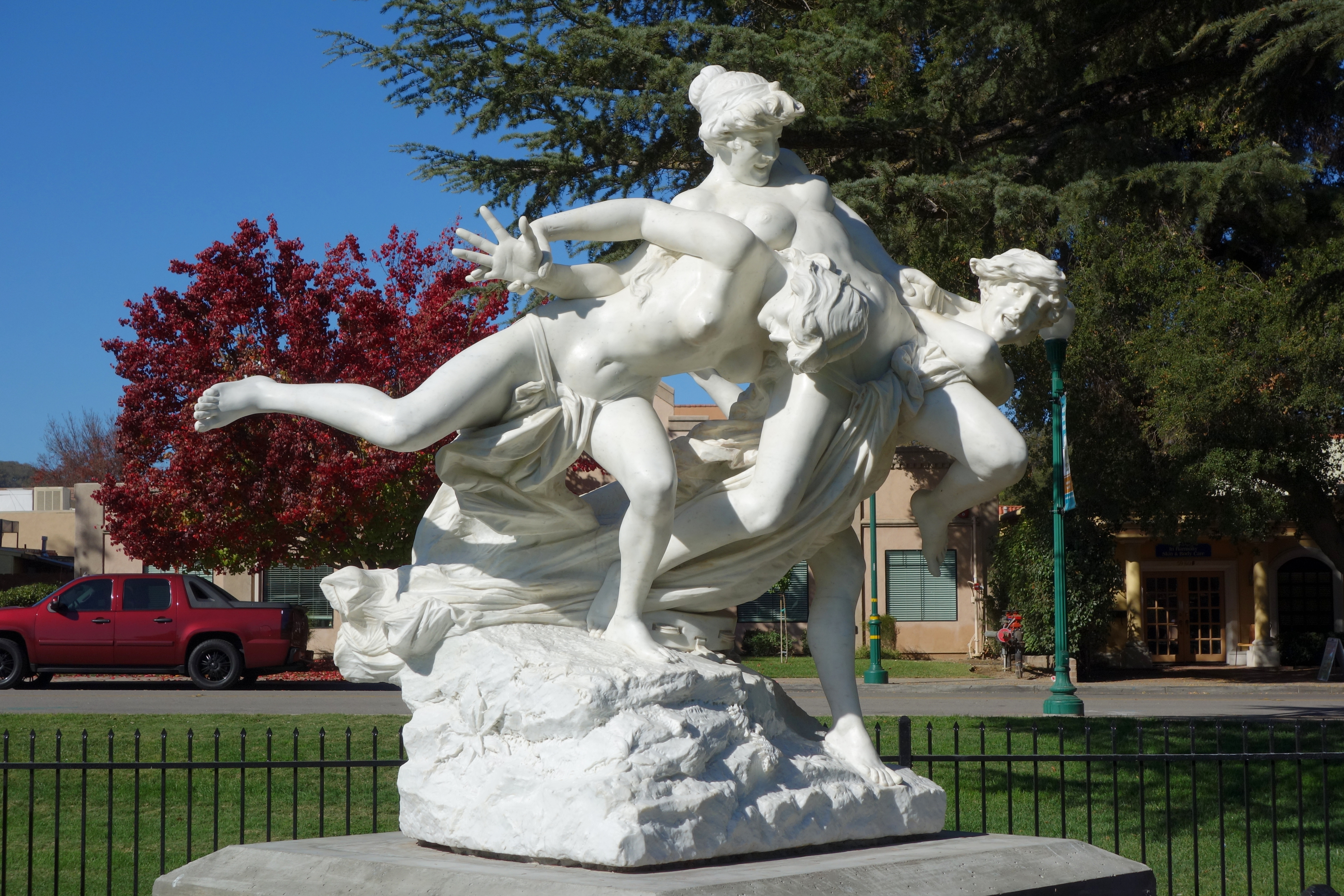
Wrestling Bacchantes, circa 1904

Aristide Petrilli (1868-1930?) was an Italian sculptor active from the late 1800s to early 1900s.

Petrilli was born in Tivoli, Lazio, and studied in Florence at the Art Institute and subsequently the Accademia di Belle Arti di Firenze from 1889 to 1890. He worked with Raffaello Romanelli before establishing his own studio at via Serragli, 152, in Florence. He specialised in romanticized figures of classical and historical themes, often using coloured marbles or bronze or gilt highlights, and is most remembered for his maidens in the Renaissance style.

Petrilli's works were exhibited in the Salon of the Société des Artistes Français in 1896 (n° 3744 "Deux haut-reliefs" and n° 3745 "L'Empereur Napoléon Bonaparte"). He subsequently exhibited a bust of Joan of Arc at the Paris Exposition Universelle (1900), and Wrestling Bacchantes at the 1904 Louisiana Purchase Exposition (St. Louis World's Fair). The Wrestling Bacchantes is now displayed in the Atascadero, California Sunken Gardens, and several other pieces at the Hearst Castle. His realistic bronze Ritratto di Giacomo Puccini is now in Montevarchi, Italy. It is also reported that in 1924 he created the plaque commemorating the Caduti per la Soc. Sportiva Sempre Avanti in Florence.
