= Central Coast Zoo (California) =

- Interactive map of Central Coast Zoo
- 35°28′00″N 120°40′13″W
- Date opened: 1955; 1963 (at current location)
- Location: Atascadero, California, United States
- Land area: 5 acres (2.0 ha)
- No. of animals: 100+
- No. of species: 45
- Annual visitors: 72,000
- Memberships: AZA
- Website: www.centralcoastzoo.org

The Central Coast Zoo (formerly Atascadero Children's Zoo and most recently Charles Paddock Zoo) is a five-acre (2.0 ha) community zoo located in San Luis Obispo County, California, in the City of Atascadero on the Central Coast. It was home to an endangered male Malayan tiger named Menderu, who died in 2025.

Accredited since 1991, the zoo is one of the smallest zoos accredited by the Association of Zoos and Aquariums (AZA).

== History ==
The Central Coast Zoo was started by Charles "Chuck" Paddock, a county park ranger, in the county animal shelter in 1955. Paddock would nurse wild animals back to health, and by 1959 his menagerie contained over 125 birds and mammals. In 1963 the animals were moved to the current location adjacent to the Atascadero Lake Park, just off State Route 41, and the new zoo was named Atascadero Children's Zoo.

In 1979, the City of Atascadero took over management of the zoo after it was incorporated. The name was changed to Charles Paddock Zoo in honor of its founder in 1980.

In 2010, while the zoo was under review for re-accreditation, it started a series of renovations and maintenance updates including new roofs, repaving, new public fencing, and a long list of other smaller projects. A new entrance to the zoo was opened on 9 November 2010. In April 2019, the zoo opened the Thelma Vetter Red Panda Experience, home to red pandas, Asian ratsnakes, and various birds.

In June 2025, the zoo's name was changed to the Central Coast Zoo, which was considered the fan-favorite name after discussion by the City Council, city staff, the Friends of the Charles Paddock Zoo, TJA Advertising Agency, local tourism agencies and community members as part of the zoo's 70th anniversary.

== Exhibits and animals ==
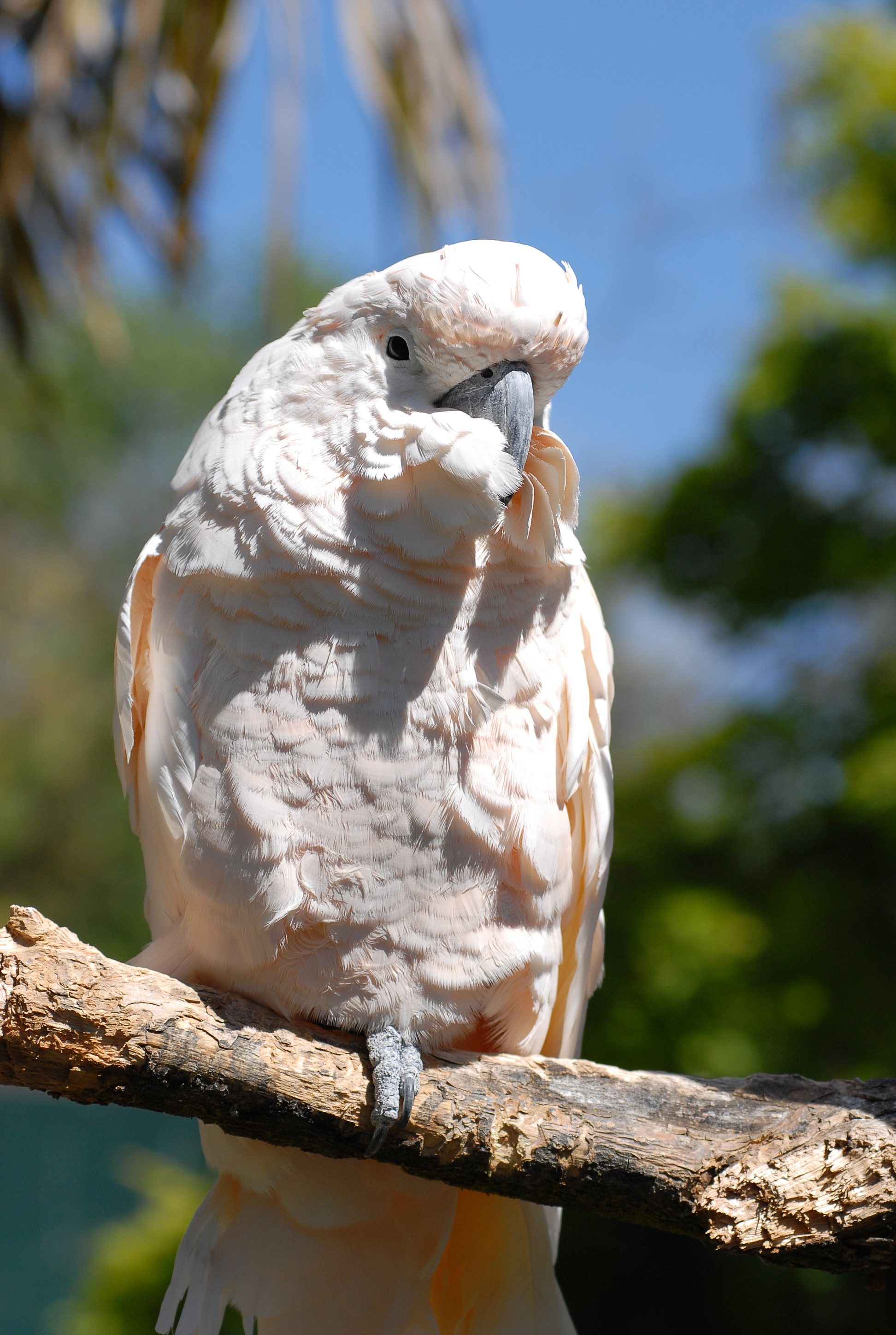
Salmon-crested cockatoo (Cacatua moluccensis)

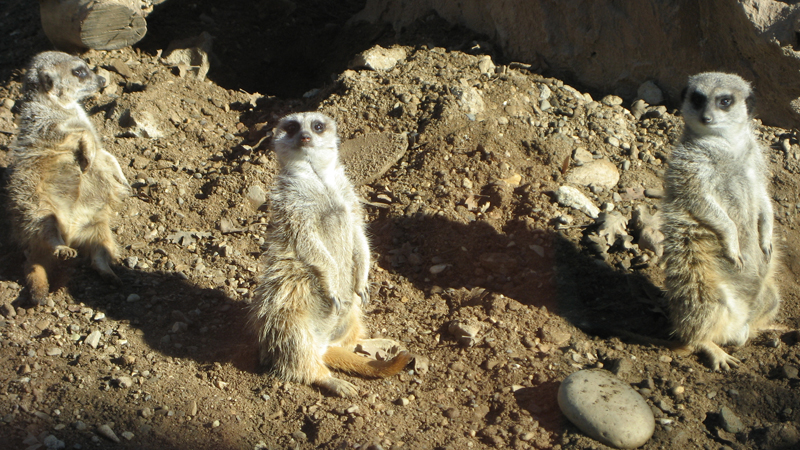
Meerkats (Suricata suricatta)

The zoo is home to more than 100 animals representing 45 species.

Birds

Birds at the zoo include black-necked stilt, Inca tern, Mandarin duck, ring-necked parakeet, ringed teal, roseate spoonbill, scarlet ibis, Sulawesi ground dove, and white-faced whistling duck in the aviary, blue and gold macaw, double yellow-headed amazon parrot, salmon-crested cockatoo, and scarlet macaw at the Parrot Pond, as well as burrowing owl, Caribbean flamingo, emu, great horned owl, and helmeted guineafowl.

Mammals

Mammals at the zoo include Jacob's sheep in the barnyard, titi monkey in the South American exhibit, and African crested porcupine, Bennett's wallaby, black-handed spider monkey, Channel Island fox, fossa, Malayan tiger, mara (Patagonia cavy), prehensile-tailed porcupine, Prevost's squirrel, red river hog, red ruffed lemur, slender-tailed meerkat, and white-fronted marmoset.

Reptiles and amphibians

Reptiles and amphibians at the zoo include Aldabra giant tortoise, Burmese python, carpet python, desert tortoise, European pond turtle, giant Asian hill tortoise, Gila monster, South American red-footed tortoise, and African bullfrog (burrowing frog).

== The Central Coast Zoo Society ==
The Central Coast Zoo Society, originally formed in 1962 as the Children's Zoo Friendship Society, has formed partnerships with both the City of Atascadero and the Zoo Director to "support and promote the Charles Paddock Zoo, its exhibits, the educational and scientific programs, and the conservation and preservation of wildlife."

== Projects ==
Plans for the future include a new fisher exhibit and a new Indo-Burma exhibit to include a tiger, red pandas, and a reptile house for Komodo dragons.
