= Love in the Present Tense =

2006 novel by Catherine Ryan Hyde

- First edition (US)
- Author: Catherine Ryan Hyde
- Language: English
- Subject: Fiction
- Published: 2006
- Publisher: Random House (US); Black Swan (UK)
- Media type: Print
- Pages: 304
- ISBN: 978-0552773645

Love in the Present Tense is a novel by Catherine Ryan Hyde, released in 2006.

== Plot ==
The story mainly concerns Mitch, who is, at the start, a 25 year old internet entrepreneur, and Leonard, initially a 5-year-old boy. Leonard's mother leaves him with Mitch each day, but one day she departs, never to return. The story is told from the perspectives of these two protagonists, at various parts of their lives (together with a few chapters contributed by Leonard's mother: Pearl). The story deals with various aspects and types of love.
