= Atascadero, California =

City in California, United States

- City
- City of Atascadero
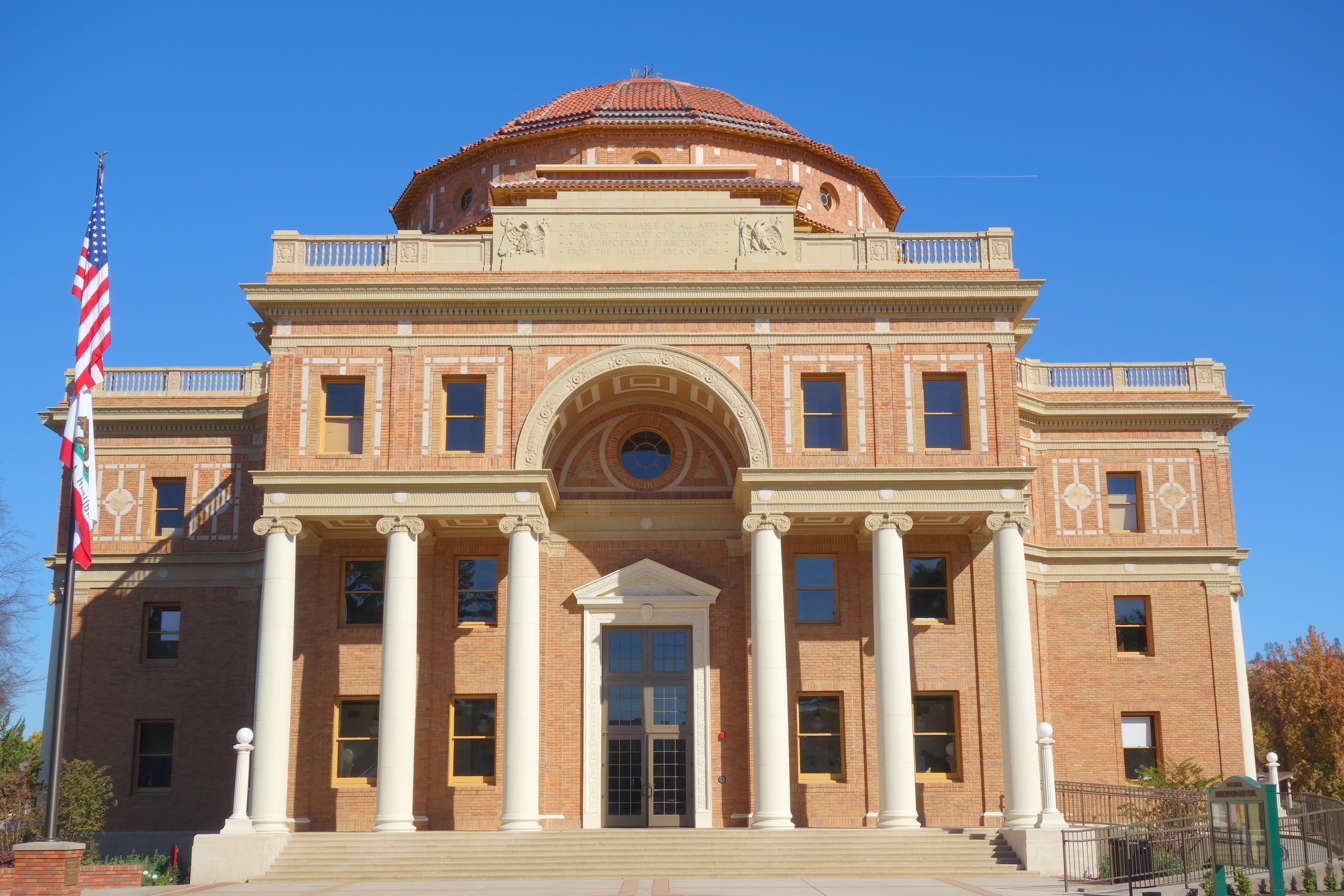
- Atascadero City Hall, built 1914–1918

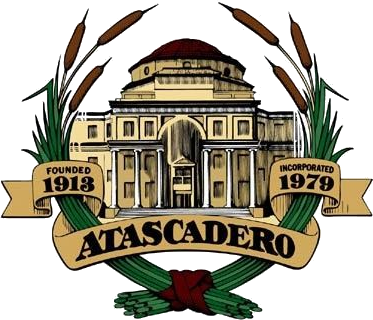
- Seal
- Interactive map of Atascadero, California
- Location in California Location in the United States
- Coordinates: 35°29′22″N 120°40′15″W
- Country: United States
- State: California
- County: San Luis Obispo
- Founded: 1913
- Incorporated: July 2, 1979
- Founder: Edward Gardner Lewis
- Named for: Spanish for bog or mire

Government
  - Type: Council–manager
  - Body: Atascadero City Council
  - Mayor: Charles Bourbeau
  - City manager: Jim Lewis
  - Council members: Mark Dariz (mayor pro tem); Susan Funk; Heather Newsom; Seth Peek
  - State assemblymember: Dawn Addis (D)
  - State senator: John Laird (D)
  - U.S. representative: Jimmy Panetta (D)

Area
  - Total: 26.14 sq mi (67.69 km^{2})
  - Land: 26.07 sq mi (67.52 km^{2})
  - Water: 0.062 sq mi (0.16 km^{2}) 0.24%
- Elevation: 879 ft (268 m)

Population (2020)
  - Total: 29,773
  - Density: 1,142.0/sq mi (440.92/km^{2})
- Time zone: UTC−8 (Pacific)
  - Summer (DST): UTC−7 (PDT)
- ZIP Codes: 93422–93423
- Area codes: 805/820
- FIPS code: 06-03064
- GNIS feature IDs: 1660277, 2409745
- Website: www.atascadero.org

Atascadero is a city in San Luis Obispo County, California, United States. It lies in the inland part of the Central Coast, between the Salinas River and the Santa Lucia Range, at the junction of U.S. Route 101 and State Route 41. Its population was 29,773 at the 2020 census.

The area has historical connections to the Salinan and Northern Chumash peoples. Publisher Edward Gardner Lewis founded the Atascadero Colony in 1913 as a planned agricultural community. Its development included orchards, a water system, a printing plant and a civic center. The colony also imposed racially restrictive property covenants. Atascadero incorporated as a city in 1979.

The former colony administration building serves as City Hall. Other institutions include Atascadero State Hospital, the Central Coast Zoo and the Atascadero Unified School District. Major employment sectors include healthcare and social services, retail, accommodation and food services, and education. Parks and open spaces include Atascadero Lake Park, Sunken Gardens and Stadium Park. The city has a Mediterranean climate, with hot, dry summers and cooler, wetter winters.

== Name ==
The Spanish name Atascadero means "bog" or "mire". The Obispeño name has been recorded as tsiskikiye, meaning "place of much water".

== History ==
=== Indigenous history ===
Atascadero lies in an area associated with both Salinan and Northern Chumash histories. A cultural resources study prepared for the city's general plan describes historical Salinan occupation and the neighboring Obispeño Chumash to the south. It notes disagreement among ethnographers over the boundary between their territories and the possibility that boundaries changed over time. Salinan communities traded with the Yokuts to the east and Chumash communities to the south.

Oak woodlands, streams and the surrounding hills provided food and materials. The city's interpretation of Salinan history at Atascadero Lake describes the preparation of acorns with mortars and pestles and the use of willow, tule and fern roots in basketry. It identifies plants around the lake that Salinan people continue to use, including several species of oak, and also describes pine nuts, buckeye nuts and choke cherries as food resources.

Spanish colonization and the mission system disrupted Indigenous communities throughout the region. Introduced diseases reduced Salinan and Chumash populations, while livestock and colonial agriculture displaced hunting and gathering areas. After mission secularization in the 1830s, land grants transferred much of the territory to private owners.

Indigenous communities maintain connections with the area. The Salinan Tribe of San Luis Obispo and Monterey Counties has an office in Atascadero. The tribe describes its members' continuing hunting, fishing and gathering practices and its educational work to preserve cultural knowledge and protect ancestral lands. In the wider San Luis Obispo County region, the YTT Northern Chumash Tribe conducts language revitalization and cultural preservation work. Its language program provides learning opportunities, mentors and other resources for tribal members.

=== Ranchos and the planned colony ===
During the Mexican period, Governor Juan Alvarado granted Rancho Atascadero to Trifon Garcia in 1842. The neighboring Rancho Asuncion was granted to Pedro Estrada in 1845. Land that became the Atascadero Colony subsequently formed part of J. H. Henry's ranch. In 1913, Edward Gardner Lewis, who had previously developed University City, Missouri, purchased land at $37.50 an acre and began promoting a planned settlement. He hired specialists in agriculture, engineering and town planning.

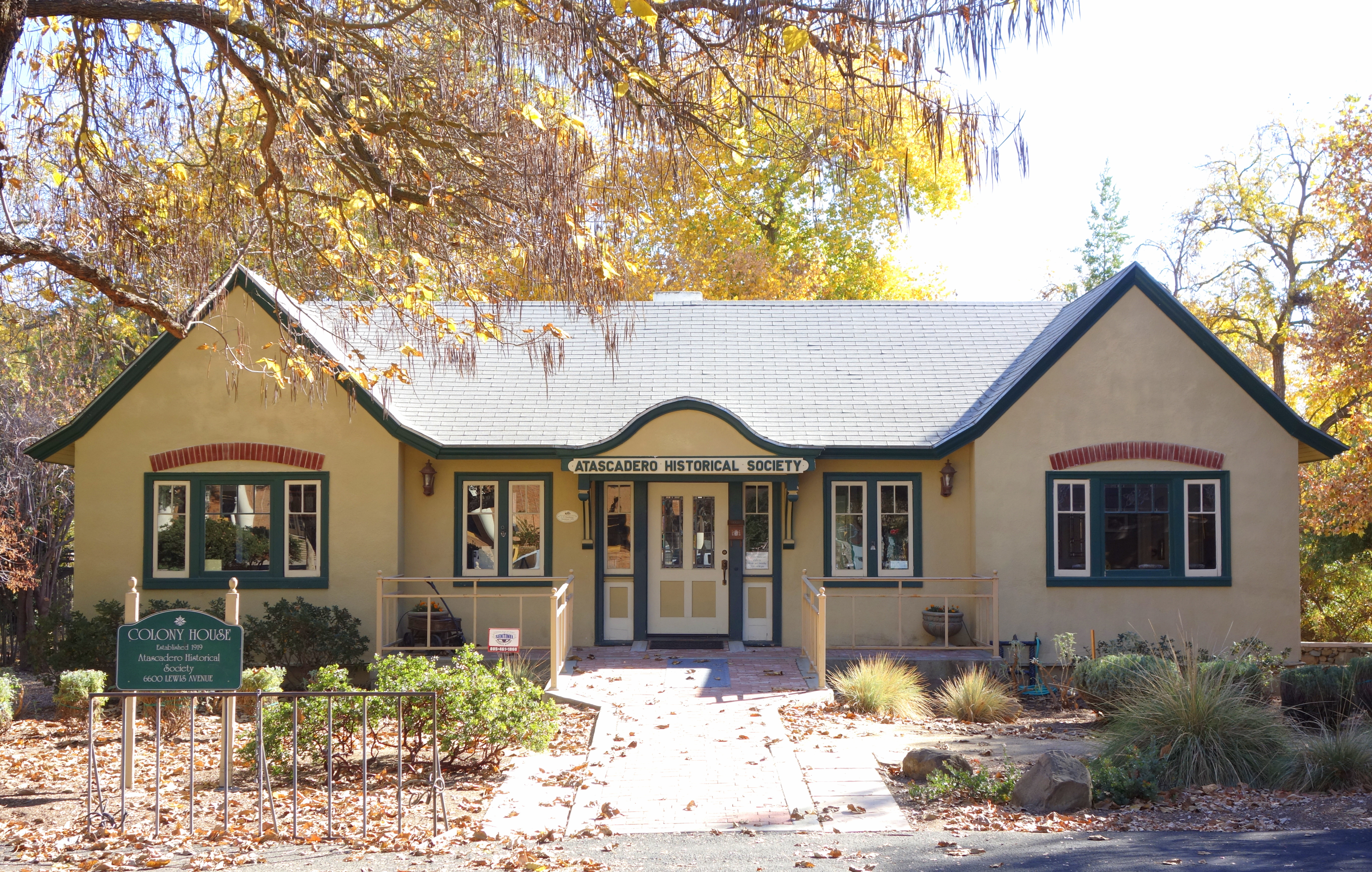
Colony House, operated by the Atascadero Historical Society

The colony's design combined residential lots, orchard tracts and a central business and civic district. Water lines and roads were installed as the property was subdivided. In her account of the settlement, colonist Marguerite Travis described a tent camp prepared for prospective buyers in 1914 and another for arriving settlers in 1915. Temporary facilities included shops, a laundry and a tent for public meetings and entertainment. Orchards included pears, peaches, apples, apricots and plums. A road through the Santa Lucia Mountains connected the colony to the coast at Morro Bay. Lewis's associated development company built the Cloisters hotel and beach cottages there.

The colony's property system excluded nonwhite residents. A 1914 deed restricted purchases to white people, and a 1920 deed also barred nonwhite occupancy and transfers. Such covenants were later made unenforceable by the 1948 Supreme Court ruling in Shelley v. Kraemer and prohibited by the Fair Housing Act of 1968. A 2023 county review of discriminatory property records identified these Atascadero deeds among the county's early examples.

The Printery, completed in 1915, housed the Woman's Publishing Company. It operated rotogravure presses that produced the Illustrated Review, women's magazines and newspaper inserts. Architect Walter D. Bliss designed the building, whose interior included murals by Ralph Holmes. The printing operation employed both men and women. The Atascadero News began publication in the Printery in 1916.

=== Civic buildings and later development ===
The colony administration building, now City Hall, was constructed between 1914 and 1918. Designed by Bliss & Faville, it used locally manufactured bricks with concrete, steel and terra cotta. The building contained colony offices and later housed schools, county offices and veterans' facilities. It is California Historical Landmark No. 958. Its plan takes the form of a Greek cross, with central rotundas. The Colony Holding Corporation's bankruptcy in the 1920s ended its use as the corporation's headquarters.

The Carlton Hotel developed as a commercial and hotel building in the late 1920s. Its lower floor contained shops, with hotel rooms above. A renovation completed in 2004 restored much of the exterior and added a third floor. Atascadero State Hospital opened in 1954. Atascadero incorporated on July 2, 1979, as a general-law city.

A house in Atascadero was used to test inventor Harold Hay's Skytherm system of passive solar heating and cooling. Shallow, enclosed water ponds on the roof were alternately covered and exposed by movable insulation panels. Exposure to sunlight provided winter heating, while exposure to the night sky allowed summer cooling. The occupied experimental house was documented in the Los Alamos Scientific Laboratory's 1976 Pacific Regional Solar Heating Handbook.

On December 22, 2003, the magnitude 6.5 San Simeon earthquake severely damaged City Hall. The upper portion of the building had less reinforcement than the lower floors, complicating its repair. Restoration included rebuilding damaged upper masonry, strengthening the structure and reinstating historic architectural features. The city used a converted bowling alley as temporary City Hall during the repairs. After ten years of closure, City Hall reopened in August 2013. The Printery was also left vacant after the earthquake. A nonprofit foundation formed in 2015 and acquired the property in 2017 to undertake stabilization and restoration.

== Geography ==
Atascadero occupies part of the upper Salinas Valley, with the Salinas River to the east and the Santa Lucia Range to the west. Its landscape includes oak woodland, grassland and chaparral. The city's open spaces provide habitat within the developed area; Atascadero Lake is a stopover for migrating waterfowl.

According to the Census Bureau's 2020 gazetteer, Atascadero covers 26.133 square miles (67.68 km^{2}), including 26.071 square miles (67.52 km^{2}) of land and 0.062 square miles (0.16 km^{2}) of water. Water accounts for approximately 0.24 percent of the total area. The United States Geological Survey records an elevation of 879 feet (268 m) for the populated place.

The city's open-space system includes both public parks and land held by conservation organizations. Oak woodland and chaparral occur on hillsides around the developed valley, while riparian habitats follow the river and creeks. The biological resources assessment for the general plan identifies blue oak–foothill pine, coast live oak woodland, annual grassland and freshwater habitats among the area's vegetation communities.

=== Climate ===
Atascadero has a Mediterranean climate, with hot, dry summers and cool, wet winters. Its inland conditions differ from those of the county's coastal communities. There is a substantial difference between daytime and nighttime temperatures. The water company's 2020 urban water management plan describes days with afternoon temperatures of 95 to 100 °F (35 to 38 °C) followed by nights and early mornings in the 50 to 59 °F (10 to 15 °C) range. Irrigation produces a strong seasonal variation in water demand: the plan reports summer monthly use at roughly three to four times winter use.

== Demographics ==
Historical population
Census	Pop.	Note	%±
1950	3,443		—
1960	5,983		73.8%
1970	10,290		72.0%
1980	16,232		57.7%
1990	23,138		42.5%
2000	26,411		14.1%
2010	28,310		7.2%
2020	29,773		5.2%
Sources: county historical census compilation; U.S. Census Bureau.

The 2020 census counted 29,773 residents, compared with 28,310 in 2010. Figures before the city's 1979 incorporation refer to the unincorporated community.

=== 2020 census ===
The population density in 2020 was 1,142.0 inhabitants per square mile (440.9/km^{2}). The census reported that 98.7 percent of residents lived in households, 0.8 percent in noninstitutionalized group quarters and 0.5 percent in institutional group quarters. Of the population, 90.5 percent lived in urban areas and 9.5 percent in rural areas.

The median age was 41.5 years. Residents under 18 accounted for 20.9 percent of the population; 6.6 percent were aged 18–24, 26.7 percent were 25–44, 25.4 percent were 45–64 and 20.4 percent were 65 or older. There were 95.7 males for every 100 females, and 93.2 males for every 100 females aged 18 or older.

The census counted 21,947 White residents, 462 Black or African American residents, 361 American Indian and Alaska Native residents, 910 Asian residents, 38 Native Hawaiian and other Pacific Islander residents, 1,894 residents of some other race and 4,161 residents of two or more races. Hispanic or Latino residents of any race numbered 5,850, or 19.6 percent of the population.

There were 11,670 households, of which 30.0 percent included children under 18. Married-couple households accounted for 52.5 percent, cohabiting-couple households for 6.9 percent, female householders without a spouse or partner for 24.2 percent, and male householders without a spouse or partner for 16.4 percent. People living alone made up 23.7 percent of households; 10.8 percent consisted of someone aged 65 or older living alone. The average household size was 2.52. There were 8,030 family households, representing 68.8 percent of all households.

The city had 12,227 housing units, with an average density of 469.0 units per square mile (181.1 units/km^{2}). Of these, 11,670 units (95.4 percent) were occupied and 557 (4.6 percent) were vacant. Owner-occupied units accounted for 64.6 percent of occupied housing, and rented units for 35.4 percent. The homeowner vacancy rate was 0.9 percent and the rental vacancy rate was 4.4 percent.

=== 2020–2024 estimates ===
The American Community Survey (ACS) estimated a population of 29,712 for the 2020–2024 five-year period. Approximately 21.0 percent of residents were under 18 and 18.5 percent were 65 or older. The estimated median age was 40.4 years.

Racial composition, 2020–2024 ACS estimates
Race	Estimated population	Percentage
White alone	21,061	70.9%
Black or African American alone	307	1.0%
American Indian and Alaska Native alone	121	0.4%
Asian alone	1,214	4.1%
Native Hawaiian and other Pacific Islander alone	4	<0.1%
Some other race alone	2,240	7.5%
Two or more races	4,765	16.0%

The ACS separately estimated that 6,692 residents, or 22.5 percent, were Hispanic or Latino of any race. These survey estimates cover a five-year period and are distinct from the 2020 census counts.

There were an estimated 11,579 households and 12,180 housing units. Family households accounted for 7,860 households, while 2,943 consisted of one person. Of occupied housing units, 7,485 were owner-occupied and 4,094 were rented. Median household income was estimated at $91,429 and per capita income at $61,687, in 2024 dollars. About 11.4 percent of residents for whom poverty status was determined lived below the poverty threshold.

An estimated 75.9 percent of residents were born in California, 15.5 percent in another state, 0.9 percent abroad to American parents, and 7.6 percent were foreign-born. Among residents aged five and older, 86.7 percent spoke only English at home and 10.4 percent spoke Spanish. Among adults aged 25 and older, 93.4 percent had completed high school or an equivalent credential, and 31.6 percent held at least a bachelor's degree.

== Economy ==
A 2023 regional broadband study reported 1,421 businesses in Atascadero in 2022. The largest industries by employment were healthcare and social services, retail, accommodation and food services, and education. Nearly 70 percent of businesses employed four people or fewer, while Atascadero State Hospital was the largest single employer.

Atascadero State Hospital is a state-operated forensic psychiatric hospital. It opened in 1954 and provides treatment to patients committed through the courts or correctional system rather than through voluntary admissions. The Department of State Hospitals reports approximately 2,140 employees at the facility, including clinical, administrative and support staff.

The city's downtown commercial area includes El Camino Real and the historic civic center. The El Camino Real Downtown Parking and Safety Enhancements Project redesigned approximately 0.6 miles (0.97 km) of the corridor, with changes to parking, pedestrian facilities and the streetscape. The approximately $12 million project began in June 2024 and was celebrated with a downtown block party in June 2025. Improvements included bicycle parking, lighting, medians and pedestrian crossings. During construction, some downtown merchants reported reduced customer traffic and difficulty attracting shoppers, while others said their businesses had not experienced a decline.

The surrounding North County region supports wineries, breweries, cider producers and other agricultural and food businesses, alongside cycling and other outdoor recreation.

== Arts and culture ==
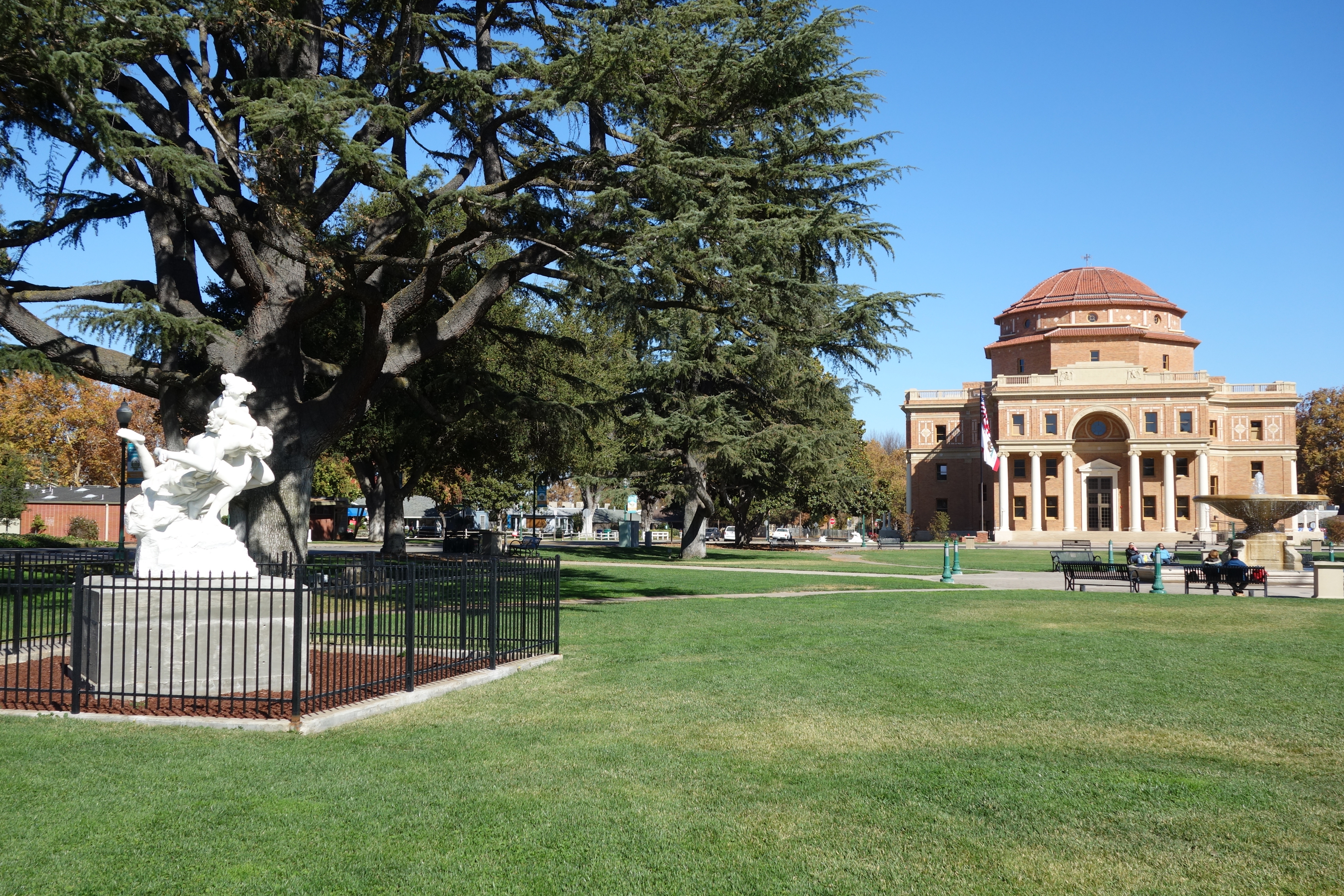
Sunken Gardens and City Hall

The Atascadero Historical Society maintains the Colony House Museum in a 1919 colony home and exhibits in City Hall. The Printery's surviving murals and printing history are also part of the city's historic preservation work.

Colony Days began in 1973, with a parade added in 1974. The community celebration includes floats and local organizations. Other recurring events include the Tamale Festival, Lakeside Wine Festival, summer concerts, the Cruisin' Weekend car events and Winter Wonderland.

The Sunken Gardens were inspired by the Grand Basin at the 1904 St. Louis World's Fair. The park contains a central fountain and the sculpture Wrestling Bacchantes, purchased by Lewis for the colony.

The Atascadero Regional Library moved to its Capistrano Avenue building in June 2014. Part of the county library system, it provides adult and youth services, public computers and study and meeting spaces. Facilities also include a Memory Lab and a teen study area.

=== In literature and film ===
Catherine Ryan Hyde's novel Pay It Forward is set in Atascadero. City Hall was used in the filming of My Blue Heaven; parts of its interior were painted pink and blue for the production.

In the 2017 Netflix series Godless, Roy Goode's older brother Jim lives in Atascadero and invites Roy to join him there.

== Parks and recreation ==
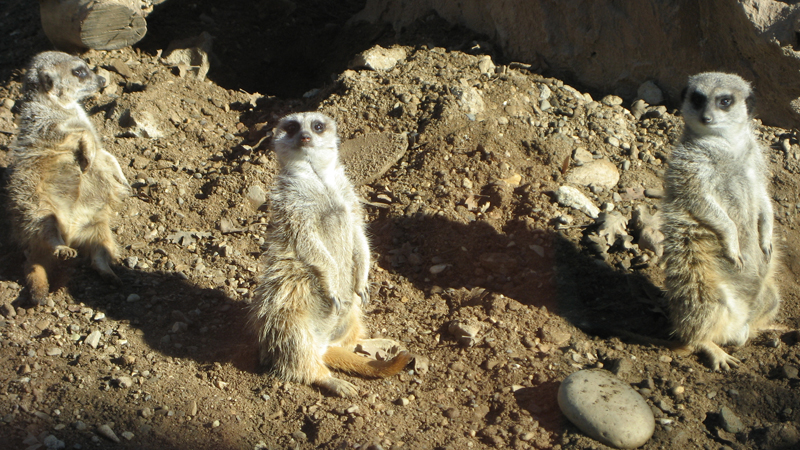
Meerkats at the zoo, then known as Charles Paddock Zoo, in 2006

Atascadero Lake Park has walking paths, playgrounds, fishing and boating facilities, the Faces of Freedom veterans' memorial and the Central Coast Zoo. The zoo originated in 1955 with park ranger Charles Paddock's care of injured animals and moved to its lake-side site in 1963. Formerly named Charles Paddock Zoo, it adopted the name Central Coast Zoo in June 2025. It is accredited by the Association of Zoos and Aquariums.

Colony Park and Paloma Creek Park contain sports fields and courts. Apple Valley Park provides open space and walking areas, while A-Town Park has indoor and outdoor facilities for skateboarding and scooters. Joy Playground, at Colony Park, opened in April 2019 through a partnership between the city and Parents for Joy. It was designed for use by children and adults with disabilities as well as other visitors. The 18,000-square-foot (1,700 m^{2}) Colony Park Community Center includes a gymnasium and spaces for youth activities, arts, dance and meetings.

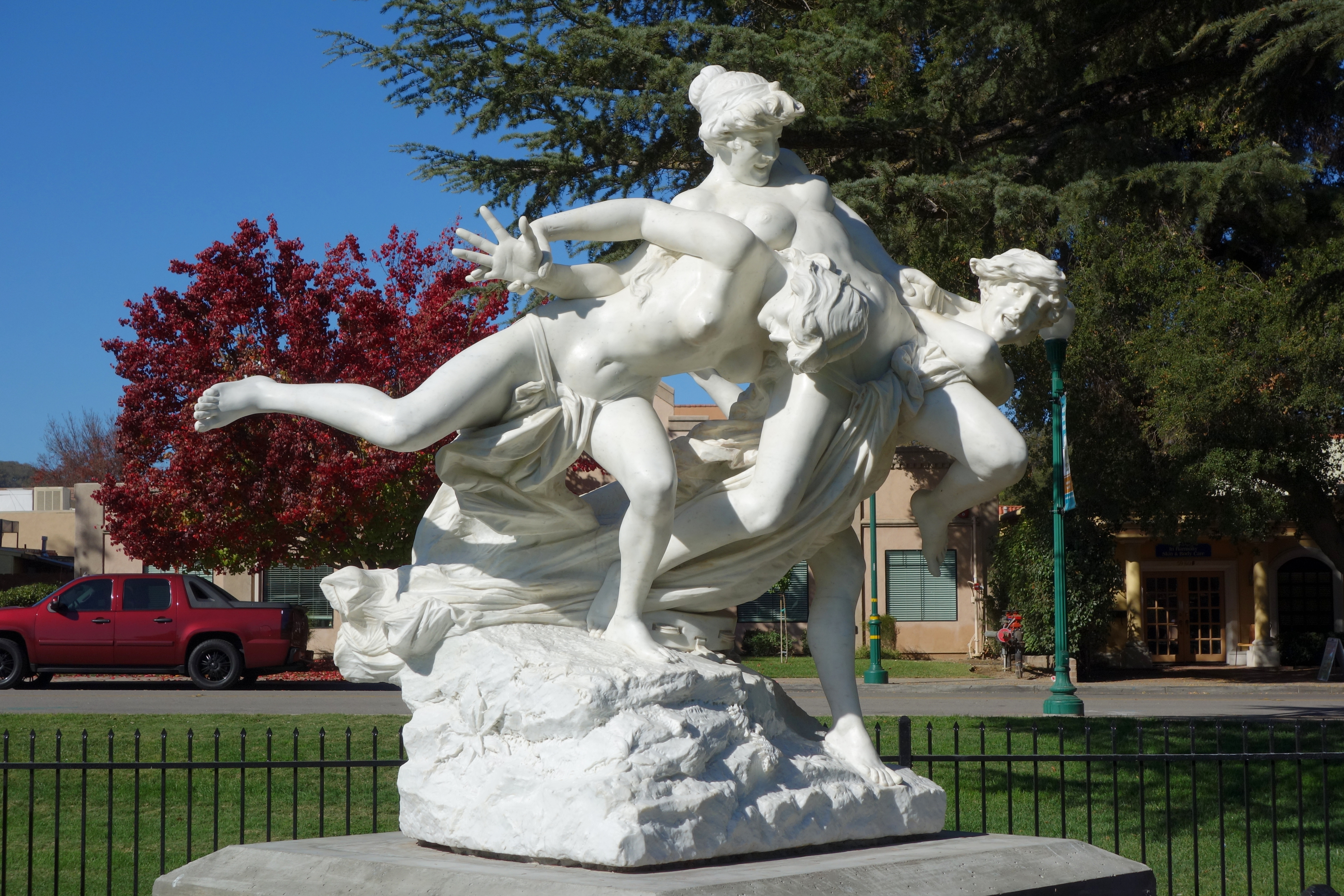
Wrestling Bacchantes by Aristide Petrilli in Sunken Gardens

Stadium Park and Pine Mountain provide hillside trails and views across the city. The Atascadero Land Preservation Society owns and maintains Three Bridges Oak Preserve, a 100-acre (40 ha) open space with hiking, cycling and equestrian trails. The organization acquires and protects undeveloped land and native trees. Heilmann Regional Park, operated by the county, includes picnic areas, a playground, disc golf, tennis and pickleball. It adjoins Chalk Mountain Golf Course. Outside the city, Lake Nacimiento provides boating, fishing, waterskiing and camping in the Santa Lucia Mountains.

== Government ==
Atascadero is a general-law city with a council–manager government. Its council has five members elected at large: a mayor serving a two-year term and four council members serving staggered four-year terms. The mayor presides over meetings, while the council sets policies and oversees municipal programs and services. The city also has an elected treasurer, whose term is four years.

As of September 2026, Charles Bourbeau is mayor; Mark Dariz is mayor pro tem; and Susan Funk, Heather Newsom and Seth Peek hold the other council seats. Jim Lewis is city manager. The council appoints the manager to direct daily operations, supervise city departments, administer the budget and implement municipal policies.

In the California State Legislature, Atascadero is represented in the 17th Senate district by John Laird and in the 30th Assembly district by Dawn Addis. In the United States House of Representatives, it is in California's 19th congressional district, represented by Jimmy Panetta.

== Education ==
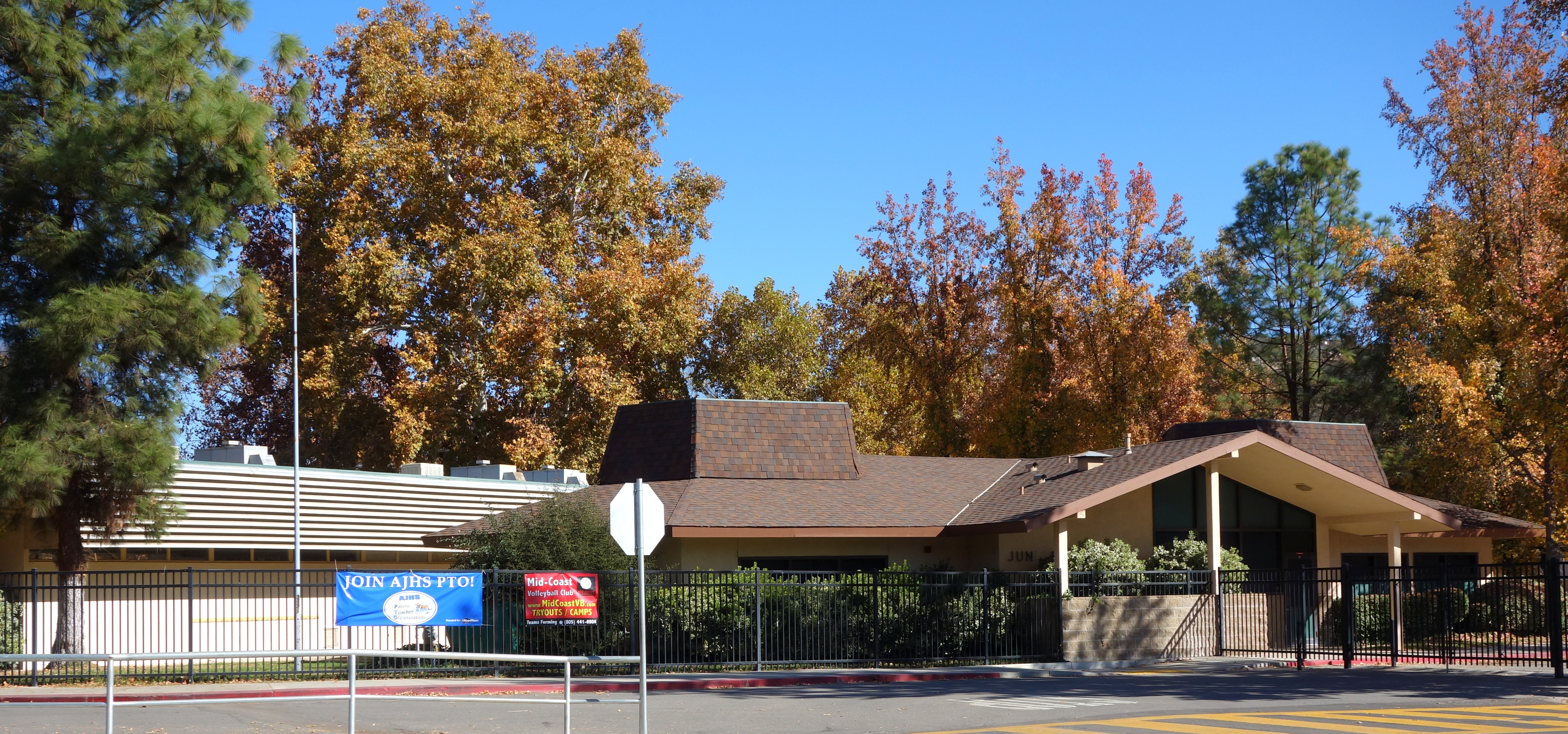
Atascadero Junior High School building in 2013

The Atascadero Unified School District serves the city and surrounding rural communities. Its 2024–2025 accountability plan described approximately 4,300 students across 12 schools, with a district area of 1,213 square miles (3,140 km^{2}). The district includes seven elementary schools, the Fine Arts Academy, Atascadero Middle School, Atascadero High School, Paloma Creek High School and an independent-study high school program.

Elementary schools in the city include Monterey Road, San Benito Road, Santa Rosa Road and San Gabriel Road. The district also operates Santa Margarita, Creston and Carrisa Plains elementary schools outside the city. The Fine Arts Academy serves grades four through eight, and Paloma Creek provides continuation high school education. The private North County Christian School adopted the name Brookside Christian Academy in 2025.

San Joaquin Valley College opened an Atascadero campus in 2018. Its 2023 catalog listed the campus as no longer enrolling new students.

== Infrastructure ==
=== Transportation ===
U.S. Route 101 is the principal north–south highway through Atascadero, connecting it with Paso Robles to the north and San Luis Obispo to the south. State Route 41 connects the city with Morro Bay across the Santa Lucia Range and with inland routes toward the San Joaquin Valley. The route to the coast developed from the colony's road to its beach properties.

The San Luis Obispo Regional Transit Authority operates Route 9 through Atascadero, linking the city with San Miguel, Paso Robles, Templeton, Santa Margarita and San Luis Obispo. The Atascadero Transit Center is a stop on the route. Amtrak Thruway Route 18, subsequently branded as Gold Runner, provided a connection through Atascadero between the Central Coast and Hanford. The operator announced its discontinuation after May 31, 2026.

The Union Pacific Railroad's Coast Line passes through Atascadero. Amtrak's Coast Starlight uses the line, with passenger stations in Paso Robles and San Luis Obispo rather than Atascadero. Commercial air service for the area is available at San Luis Obispo County Regional Airport.

=== Water and public safety ===
The Atascadero Mutual Water Company supplies the city and adjoining unincorporated areas. Its wells draw groundwater, supplemented by water from Lake Nacimiento that is released into a recharge basin. The company began receiving Nacimiento water in summer 2012; downstream wells extract a mixture of native groundwater and the recharged supply. Its service system included about 240 miles (390 km) of pipelines and nine storage tanks in 2020.

In November 2025, an environmental review described a proposed treatment plant for PFAS detected in the company's production wells along the Salinas River. The planned facility would be at the company's existing corporation yard near State Route 41 and Sycamore Road. In April 2026, the company adopted new water and PFAS rates, citing treatment-plant costs, operations and regulatory compliance.

Atascadero Fire and Emergency Services operates two stations and responds to fires, medical emergencies, traffic collisions, hazardous-material incidents and technical rescues. San Luis Ambulance and neighboring fire agencies also participate in emergency responses within the city. The city's police dispatch center handles emergency calls and dispatches police, fire and medical responses. Wildfire prevention work includes vegetation management in open spaces adjoining residential areas. A 2025 project in Stadium Park and Pine Mountain brought together the city fire department, San Luis Obispo Fire Safe Council and Atascadero Land Preservation Society to remove hazardous brush and trim trees, with funding from a state wildfire-prevention grant.
