= Pay It Forward (film) =

2000 American film by Mimi Leder

- Theatrical release poster
- Directed by: Mimi Leder
- Screenplay by: Leslie Dixon
- Based on: Pay It Forward by Catherine Ryan Hyde
- Produced by: Peter Abrams; Robert L. Levy; Steven Reuther
- Starring: Kevin Spacey; Helen Hunt; Haley Joel Osment; Jay Mohr; James Caviezel; Jon Bon Jovi; Angie Dickinson
- Cinematography: Oliver Stapleton
- Edited by: David Rosenbloom
- Music by: Thomas Newman
- Production companies: Bel-Air Entertainment; Tapestry Films
- Distributed by: Warner Bros. Pictures
- Release date: October 20, 2000
- Running time: 123 minutes
- Country: United States
- Language: English
- Budget: $40 million
- Box office: $55.7 million

Pay It Forward is a 2000 American romantic drama film directed by Mimi Leder. The film is based loosely on the novel of the same name by Catherine Ryan Hyde. It is set in Las Vegas, and it chronicles 12 year-old Trevor McKinney's launch of a goodwill movement known as "pay it forward". It stars Haley Joel Osment as Trevor, Helen Hunt as his alcoholic single mother Arlene McKinney, and Kevin Spacey as his physically and emotionally scarred social studies teacher Eugene Simonet. The film was released on October 20, 2000, and received mixed to unfavorable reviews from critics, who praised the performances (particularly from Spacey, Hunt and Osment), but deemed it "emotionally manipulative" and panned its third act. The film was a box office disappointment, grossing $55.7 million worldwide against a $40 million budget.

== Plot ==
Trevor McKinney begins the seventh grade in Las Vegas. His social studies teacher, Eugene Simonet, assigns the class to put into action a plan that will change the world for the better. Trevor calls his plan "pay it forward", which means the recipient of a favor does a favor for three others rather than paying it back. However, it needs to be a favor that the recipient cannot complete themselves. Trevor implements the plan himself, forming a branch of good deeds. Trevor's first deed is letting a homeless man named Jerry live in his garage, and Jerry pays the favor forward by doing car repairs for Trevor's mother, Arlene, though Jerry later disappoints Trevor by moving out and returning to drug use.

Meanwhile, Arlene confronts Eugene about Trevor's project after discovering Jerry in their house. Trevor then selects Eugene as his next "pay it forward" target and tricks Eugene and Arlene into a romantic dinner date. This also appears to fail, and Trevor and Arlene argue about her love for Ricky, her alcoholic ex-husband, to the point where Arlene slaps Trevor in a fit of anger. Eugene and Arlene are brought together again when Trevor runs away from home.

Trevor's school assignment marks the beginning of the story's chronology, but the opening scene in the film shows one of the later favors in the "pay it forward" tree, in which a man gives a car to Los Angeles journalist Chris Chandler. As the film proceeds, Chris traces the chain of favors back to its origin as Trevor's school project. After her date with Eugene, Arlene pays Jerry's favor forward by forgiving her own mother, Grace, for her mistakes in raising Arlene, and Grace, who is homeless, helps a gang member escape from the police. The gang member then saves an asthmatic girl's life in a hospital, and the girl's father gives Chris his new car.

Chris finally identifies Trevor as the originator of "pay it forward" and conducts a recorded interview in which Trevor describes his hopes and concerns for the project. Eugene, hearing Trevor, realizes that he and Arlene should be together. As Eugene and Arlene reconcile with an embrace, Trevor notices his friend Adam being bullied. He pays forward to Adam by rushing into the scene and fighting the bullies while Eugene and Arlene rush to stop him. One of the bullies pulls out a switchblade as another one pushes Trevor against him, stabbing Trevor in the stomach. Trevor later dies from the stab wound at the hospital.

Trevor's death and the spreading "Pay It Forward" movement are then reported in the news. The movie ends with Arlene and Eugene mourning Trevor's death at Arlene's home when they see thousands of people affected by the "Pay It Forward" movement, including students from Trevor's school, gathering outside in a vigil in Trevor's honor.

== Cast ==
- Kevin Spacey as Eugene Simonet, Trevor's social studies teacher, and an emotionally and physically scarred man. As a teenager, he suffered abuse from his father (including lighting him on fire) and still has burns visible on his face and torso. He begins the film as a shy recluse, self-conscious about his deformities, but eventually, he enters a relationship with Trevor's mother Arlene, and overcomes his fears. He sets an assignment for Trevor's class, asking them to change the world for the better. He is changed significantly from the novel, where there was an African-American man named Reuben St. Clair who had been injured in the Vietnam War.
- Helen Hunt as Arlene McKinney, Trevor's mother, a recovering alcoholic. She works two jobs in Las Vegas, one as a cocktail waitress and the other as a change attendant in a casino. She is given a second chance by her son when he sets her up with his teacher.
- Haley Joel Osment as Trevor McKinney, Arlene's son and Eugene's student. He creates a plan for "paying forward" favors as a social studies project. He not only affects the life of his struggling single mother, but sets in motion an unprecedented wave of human kindness which grows into a national phenomenon.
- Jay Mohr as Chris Chandler, a reporter who traces the "pay it forward" movement from Los Angeles back to Trevor. He interviews Trevor and writes a magazine column about the movement after Trevor's death.
- James Caviezel as Jerry, a homeless drug addict whom Trevor attempts to help as part of the "pay it forward" movement. Although Trevor believes his attempts have failed once Jerry relapses into drug use, Jerry eventually pays it forward by saving a woman who is about to kill herself by jumping off a bridge.
- Jon Bon Jovi as Ricky McKinney, Trevor's abusive and alcoholic father who has left the family. Arlene often allows him to return to the family despite the abuse; however, she learns throughout the film to reject him and protect Trevor and herself from violence.
- Angie Dickinson as Grace, Arlene's mother and Trevor's maternal grandmother. Although she was a negligent parent to Arlene, almost forcing them to live on the street, Arlene eventually forgives her as part of the "pay it forward" movement.
- Marc Donato as Adam, Trevor's friend who has been bullied his whole life at school. Trevor pays it forward to him by preventing him from being bullied; however, Trevor is fatally stabbed in the process.
- David Ramsey also stars as Sidney Parker, also involved in the "pay it forward" movement, as does Gary Werntz (director Mimi Leder's real-life husband) as Mr. Thorsen. Kathleen Wilhoite also stars as Bonnie, Arlene's sponsor and mentor.

== Production ==
Leslie Dixon adapted the screenplay from the book of the same name by Catherine Ryan Hyde, which was available as an open writing assignment. Dixon struggled with the adaptation of the book in part because of multiple narrative voices within it. Specifically, the reporter, the central character in the film, does not show up until halfway through the novel. Stuck, Dixon considered returning the money she was paid for the assignment. She eventually hit upon the idea to start with the reporter and trace the events backward. Dixon presented the idea to Hyde who in turn liked it so much that she decided to change the then-unpublished novel's plot structure to mirror the film's. In the novel, the character of Eugene Simonet was originally an African-American man named Reuben St. Clair. The role was offered to Denzel Washington, but he turned it down to do Remember the Titans instead. Kevin Spacey was contacted next and accepted the role of Eugene Simonet.

In November 1999, it was announced that Haley Joel Osment had been cast as Trevor McKinney.

Though the book is set in Atascadero, California, location scout Maggie Mancuso noted the movie initially placed the story in Tucson, Arizona, then later the film production changed the setting to Las Vegas, Nevada, to "show Las Vegas life off the Strip." Filming took place between February and April 2000 in Las Vegas and in studio in Los Angeles, California, with additional shooting (for the bridge scene) taking place in Portland, Oregon.

=== Music ===
The film's soundtrack was composed and created by Thomas Newman and was released by Varèse Sarabande on October 31, 2000. The soundtrack was generally praised by critics, and is considered to be fitting with the theme of the film.

The track listing of the soundtrack is:

- "Possibility" (2:34)
- "Car Trouble" (1:08)
- "Washer Vodka" (1:53)
- "Cereal Bum" (1:04)
- "Come Out Jerry" (1:10)
- "Fixture Vodka" (1:37)
- "Rat Bastard" (0:57)
- "One Kiss" (1:47)
- "Tardiness" (2:11)
- "In Recovery" (1:03)
- "Jaguar" (1:04)
- "Dumpster" (1:11)
- "Sleepover" (4:33)
- "Cosmic Aristotle" (1:56)
- "Euphemism" (1:06)
- "Pay It Forward" (1:06)
- "Night and Day and Night" (1:09)
- "Asthma" (0:59)
- "Powers of Three" (1:03)
- "Desert Drive" (1:35)
- "Wasted Air" (1:42)
- "The Bad Thing" (0:51)
- "Gasoline" (1:40)
- "Velocity Organ" (1:27)
- "I Forgive You" (2:26)

In addition, the song "Calling All Angels" by Jane Siberry is played at the end of the film and is included on the soundtrack.

== Reception ==
=== Box office ===
The film opened at #4 at the North American box office making $9,631,359 million USD in its opening weekend, behind Remember the Titans, Bedazzled and Meet the Parents, the latter of which was on its third week of release at the number one spot.

=== Critical response ===
On Rotten Tomatoes, the film has an approval score of 39% based on 127 reviews, with an average rating of 5.7/10. The consensus reads, "Pay It Forward has strong performances from Spacey, Hunt, and Osment, but the movie itself is too emotionally manipulative and the ending is bad." On Metacritic, the film has a score of 40 out of 100 based on reviews from 34 critics, indicating "mixed or average reviews". Audiences polled by CinemaScore gave the film an average grade of "A" on an A+ to F scale.

Roger Ebert of the Chicago Sun-Times gave the film two and a half out of four stars, stating "With a cleaner story line, the basic idea could have been free to deliver. As it is, we get a better movie than we might have, because the performances are so good: Spacey as a vulnerable and wounded man, Hunt as a woman no less wounded in her own way, and Osment, once again proving himself the equal of adult actors in the complexity and depth of his performance. I believed in them and cared for them. I wish the movie could have gotten out of their way."

Entertainment Weekly's Lisa Schwarzbaum gave it a "D" grade, calling it "reprehensible" for using "shameless cliches of emotional and physical damage" and then "blackmailing audiences into joining the let's-be-nice 'movement'" in order to be transparent Oscar bait.

== See also ==
- List of films set in Las Vegas
