= Carlton Hotel (Atascadero, California) =

The Carlton Hotel
- Interactive map of the The Carlton Hotel area
- Hotel chain: Tribute Portfolio

General information
- Location: United States, 6005 El Camino Real; Atascadero, California
- Coordinates: 35.48937°N 120.6699°W
- Opening: 1929 / 2005

Technical details
- Floor count: 3

Other information
- Number of rooms: 52
- Number of suites: 2
- Number of restaurants: 2
- Number of bars: 1
- Facilities: 3 meeting rooms "Back Porch Bakery" "Nectar & Noble"
- Parking: Private and Public

Website
- [carltonca.com]

The Carlton Hotel is a luxury hotel located in Atascadero, California, along the state's Central Coast in San Luis Obispo County. Construction began in 1928, with the hotel officially opening its doors in 1929. After several decades of local popularity and notoriety, by the early 1980s the property had fallen into deep disrepair.

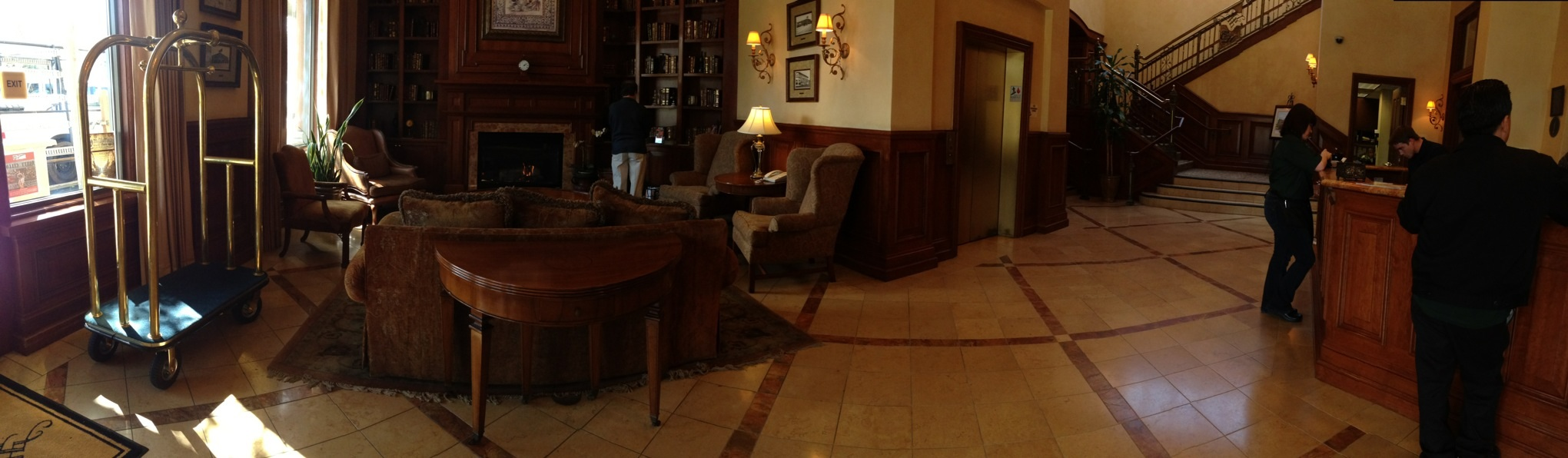
Panorama view of the lobby of the Carlton Hotel in Atascadero.

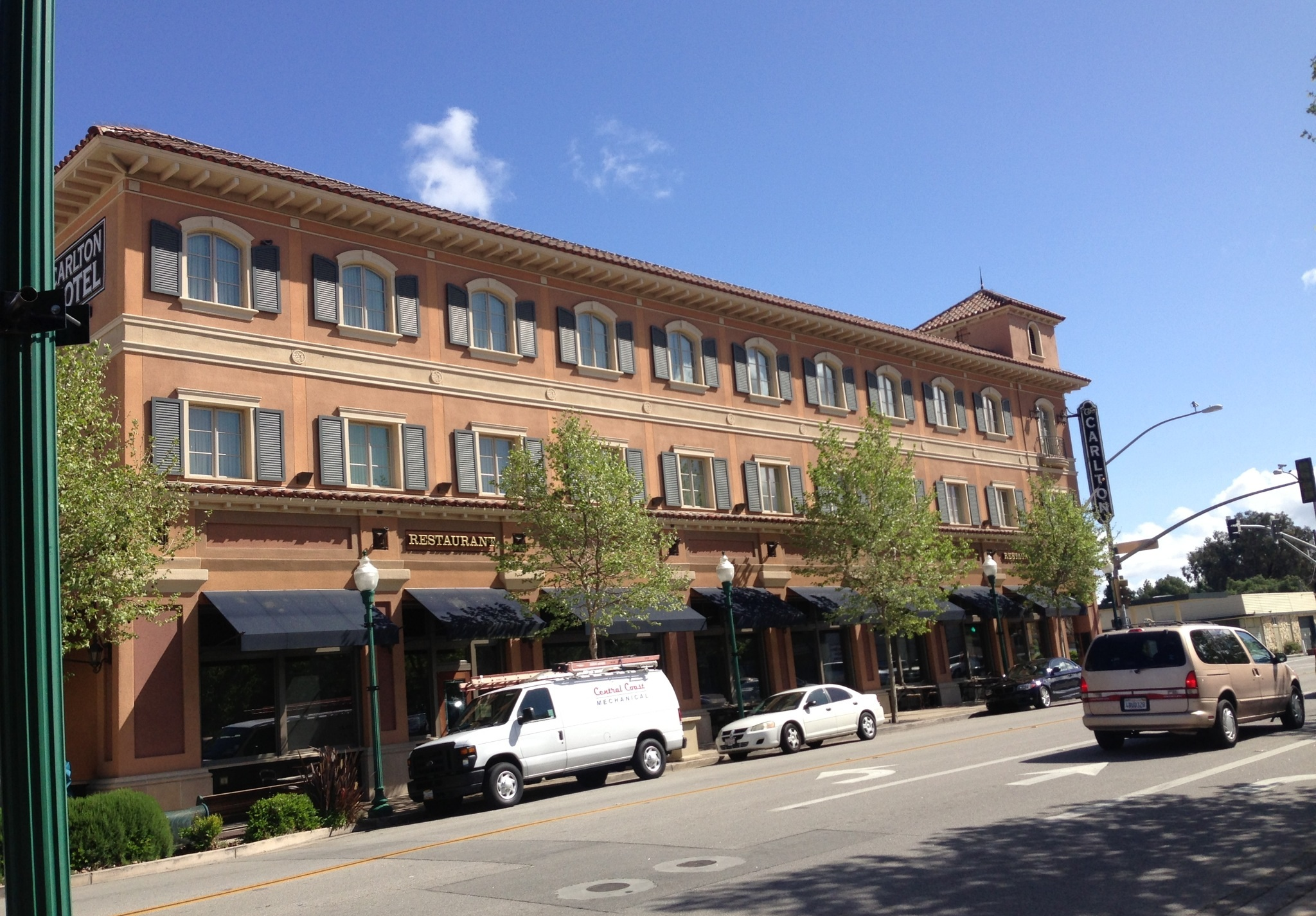
Exterior of the Carlton Hotel in Downtown Atascadero as seen on Tuesday, April 7, 2015.

During this time, the dilapidation had degenerated into such extent that several local bands would play in the dark and abandoned lobby, and the gold-plated hands of the tower clock were stolen sometime in the late 1970s.

In 1999, a joint-venture, formed between David Weyrich, David Crabtree and Steve Landaker, purchased the hotel and embarked on a renovation project. They reopened the facility in 2004.

In 2023, The Carlton was acquired by new owners, who announced they would renovate the hotel.
