= Chain of Fools (film) =

2001 film by Traktor

- DVD cover
- Directed by: Pontus Löwenhielm; Patrick von Krusenstjerna
- Written by: Bix Skahill
- Produced by: Tony Lord; Matthew Weaver; Happy Walters
- Starring: Steve Zahn; Salma Hayek; Elijah Wood; David Cross; Tom Wilkinson; David Hyde Pierce; Lara Flynn Boyle; Jeff Goldblum
- Cinematography: Frederick Elmes
- Edited by: Harvey Rosenstock
- Music by: David A. Hughes; John Murphy
- Production companies: Bel-Air Entertainment; City Block Films; Weaver/Lord Productions
- Distributed by: Warner Bros. Pictures
- Release date: March 3, 2001 (Sweden)
- Running time: 96 minutes
- Country: United States
- Language: English
- Budget: $20 million

Chain of Fools is a 2000 American heist comedy film directed by Swedish production collective Traktor. It stars Steve Zahn, Salma Hayek, Elijah Wood, David Cross, Tom Wilkinson, David Hyde Pierce, Lara Flynn Boyle, and Jeff Goldblum. Chain of Fools was scheduled for release in the United States by Warner Bros. Pictures in the fall of 2000, but it ended up only being theatrically released in Sweden on March 3, 2001. After further delays, the film was released straight to video in the US on February 15, 2005.

== Plot ==
Thomas Kresk isn't good at his job, has lost somewhere to live, and his wife dumps him for their marriage counselor. Kresk is depressed and contemplating suicide. Meanwhile, a criminal named Avnet has stolen three priceless coins and decided to blackmail Bollingsworth, his billionaire partner in crime. When Kresk overhears this, he almost gets shot while Avnet ends up impaled on a pair of barbers' scissors.

In his escalated situation, Kresk opts to steal the coins. He proceeds to hire hit man Mikey, who he discovers to be only seventeen and emotionally traumatized by his parents' suicide. Continuing, Kresk falls in love with the cop in pursuit/Playboy model Sgt. Meredith Kolko, and his nephew Scottie swallows the coins. Far in over his head, Kresk needs to deal with the strange and dangerous people around him.

== Cast ==
- Steve Zahn as Kresk
- Salma Hayek as Kolko
- Elijah Wood as Mikey
- David Cross as Andy
- Tom Wilkinson as Bollingsworth
- Orlando Jones as Miss Cocoa
- Kevin Corrigan as Paulie
- David Hyde Pierce as Mr. Kerner
- Lara Flynn Boyle as Karen
- Jeff Goldblum as Avnet
- Craig Ferguson as Melander Stevens
- John Cassini as Henchman
- Myndy Crist as Jeannie
- Michael Rapaport as Hitman
- Michael Kopsa as Senator Dove

== Production ==
The primary filming location was Vancouver, British Columbia, Canada.

== Release ==
Chain of Fools premiered in Sweden on March 3, 2001. The film was scheduled for a US release by Warner Bros. Pictures in the fall of 2000, but this never happened. It was then shelved for five years before finally released on DVD on February 15, 2005.

=== Critical reception ===
Variety said the film is "uneven but shows definite signs of promise."
