= Steven Reuther =

American film producer

- Born: Steven Daniel Reuther; November 2, 1951; St. Petersburg, Florida, U.S.
- Died: June 5, 2010 (aged 58); Santa Monica, California, U.S.
- Occupation: Producer
- Years active: 1986–2010
- Spouses: Helen Shaver (m. 1979; div. 1982) Natalie Zimmerman (m. 1989; div. 1993)
- Children: 1

Steven Daniel Reuther (November 2, 1951 – June 5, 2010) was an American producer and executive producer.

== Life and career ==
Born in St. Petersburg, Florida, in his early twenties, Reuther was rendered quadriplegic in a motor accident; after ten years of rehabilitation, he made a full recovery. Reuther came to Los Angeles, California in the late 1970s. He landed his first job in the mailroom at William Morris Agency, quickly becoming the first assistant to Stan Kamen. Leveraging his relationship with Kamen, he worked with such stars as Donald Sutherland, Jon Voight, Goldie Hawn and Sally Field.

He became an expert in film finance and structured numerous movies, pioneering the use of Canadian tax structures.

Reuther served as VP of Galactic Films, where he helped develop Adrian Lyne's 9½ Weeks. He then segued to Vestron Pictures in 1986, serving as the executive producer of Dirty Dancing and other pictures. He then partnered with Arnon Milchan at New Regency developing pictures including Sidney Lumet's Family Business, and The War of the Roses. He went on to produce and executive produce more than 35 films in partnership with Milchan, including the 1990 smash Pretty Woman, which launched Julia Roberts. In March 1994, Reuther announced that he had formed a new film production company, Douglas/Reuther Productions, in partnership with Michael Douglas and affiliated with Paramount Pictures. Douglas and Reuther also co-owned a film financing company, Constellation Films with German financer Bodo Scriba and distributor Constantin Film, to fund its movies.

In 1998, Reuther created Bel-Air Entertainment, and served as its chairman and CEO. While at Bel-Air he was most proud of his movie Pay It Forward, whose title became entered everyday culture. He also shepherded Proof of Life, Sweet November, Rock Star and Collateral Damage.

His feature film credits include Dirty Dancing (1987), Pretty Woman (1990), Sommersby (1993), The Client (1994), and Face/Off (1997), The Rainmaker (1997) and Sweet November (2001)

Reuther died on June 5, 2010, after a battle with cancer at age 58. A memorial service was held at the Self-Realization Fellowship Lake Shrine.

== Filmography ==
He was a producer in all films unless otherwise noted.

=== Film ===
Year	Film	Credit	Notes
1986	9½ Weeks	Associate producer	
1987	Dirty Dancing	Executive producer	
1987	China Girl	Executive producer	
1988	And God Created Woman	Executive producer	
1988	Call Me	Executive producer	
1988	Paramedics	Executive producer	
1989	Parents	Executive producer	
1989	Big Man on Campus	Executive producer	
1989	Hider in the House	Executive producer	
1990	Pretty Woman		
1990	Catchfire	Executive producer	
1990	Love Hurts	Executive producer	
1991	Guilty by Suspicion	Executive producer	
1992	The Mambo Kings	Executive producer	
1992	The Power of One	Executive producer	
1992	Under Siege		
1992	That Night		
1993	Sommersby		
1993	Made in America	Co-executive producer	
1993	Striking Distance	Executive producer	
1994	The Client		
1995	Boys on the Side		
1996	The Ghost and the Darkness	Executive producer	
1997	Face/Off	Executive producer	
1997	The Rainmaker		
2000	Ready to Rumble	Executive producer	
2000	The Replacements	Executive producer	
2000	Chain of Fools	Executive producer	
2000	Pay It Forward		
2000	Proof of Life	Executive producer	
2001	Sweet November		
2001	Rock Star	Executive producer	
2002	Collateral Damage		
2005	Man of the House		
2009	The Ugly Truth		Final film as a producer

Production manager

Year	Film	Role
1987	Promised Land	Executive in charge of production

Thanks

Year	Film	Role
1994	Second Best	Thanks

=== Television ===
Year	Title	Credit	Notes
2001	Watching the Detectives	Executive producer	Television film
