= Catherine Ryan Hyde =

American writer (born 1955)

- Born: 1955 (age 70–71)
- Occupations: Novelist; short story writer
- Website: www.catherineryanhyde.com

Catherine Ryan Hyde (born 1955) is an American novelist and short story writer, with more recent forays and notable success in transitioning from traditional publication towards the world of eBook publication. Her novels have enjoyed bestseller status in both the U.S. and U.K., and her short stories have won many awards and honors. Her book Pay It Forward, was later adapted into a film of the same name and her novel Electric God is currently in development.

Many of Hyde's literary works are optimistic explorations of ordinary people, characters who are troubled or down-on-their-luck or recovering from past difficulties or abuse. Many feature journeys that parallel some of Hyde's own travels, life in New York City, small towns, and 'cross country' travels and explore settings often in those areas and the American West and Southwest. Hyde's Young writings and activities deal issues such as alcoholism, social service difficulties, etc.

== Early life ==
Catherine Ryan Hyde was born in a family of writers, and lived during her early life in the Buffalo, New York area, and briefly lived in New York City, an influence which often recurs in her writing in the form of being a setting for part of or the whole story arc. She attributes her changeover from "the last kid picked" on the team towards becoming a writer to a favorite teacher, Lenny Horowitz, who later died of liver cancer. After an accelerated graduation from high school at the age of 17, Hyde worked many jobs such as being a dog trainer, a tour guide at Hearst Castle, and working in a bakery prior to dedicating herself to become a full-time writer in the early 1980s.

After relocating cross country to the Los Angeles area, she currently lives and writes and blogs from her home and areas around Cambria, California.

== Early writing career: short stories and novels ==
Early successes came from writing short stories, at one point racking up more than 122 rejections before being first published, and since then a total of more than 1500 rejections resulting in about 50 published stories.

During this time, Hyde also wrote her first novel(s) Walter's Purple Heart, her first published Novel Funeral for Horses, and an anthology of 18 short stories, Earthquake Weather. A self-described literary writer, her breakthrough novel Pay It Forward was released in 1999 (Pocket Books) and quickly became a national bestseller, and was later adapted into the film Pay It Forward (Warner Brothers), which was released in 2000.

== Pay It Forward ==
According to published interviews, the genesis of the idea for the novel came when Hyde's car caught fire in what she described as the "bad neighborhood" in which she lived, and two total strangers came to her assistance, then left before she could even thank them.

Since then Pay It Forward, has been translated into twenty languages for publication in more than thirty countries, and was chosen among the Best Books for Young Adults in 2001 by the American Library Association and continues to be among her most popular and requested works. The movie Pay It Forward (Warner Brothers) was released theatrically in 2000, starring Haley Joel Osment, Helen Hunt and Kevin Spacey.

A Young Reader's Version was released on August 19, 2014. The new version tells the same story but was extensively revised to be more complementary to lesson plans, summer reading lists for students at a middle school grade level, that is, for students at approximately the same age and maturity level as the novel's main protagonist Trevor McKinney.

== Other writing ==
Hyde's work has appeared in publications such as The Antioch Review, Michigan Quarterly Review, The Virginia Quarterly Review, The Sun, Ploughshares, and Glimmer Train. Two of her stories have been honored in the Raymond Carver Short Story Contest. She received second place in the 1998 Bellingham Review Tobias Wolff Award for Fiction. Nearly a dozen of her stories have been nominated for Best American Short Stories, the O'Henry Award, and the Pushcart Prize.

== Current writing career ==
Since the success of Pay It Forward, Hyde has gone on to publish a total of more than 24 novels, and many more short stories, including major YA works such as The Year of My Miraculous Reappearance, Becoming Chloe, and an LGBT /YA Novel Jumpstart the World, which garnered several nominations "shortlist" mentions for awards such as the "Best Read of the Year award at the British Book Awards and as a Lambda Literary Award Finalist in 2011.

== Photography ==
Catherine has been posting digital versions of wildlife in and around Cambria and on many of her travels for many years, including some of her own "pay it forward" style activities. Featured subjects include wildlife, wildflowers, sunsets, and photographs of interesting cloud formations that she refers to as "done by the Cloud Painter". Many of her best photographs are included in a special "coffee table" book of photographs called 365 Days of Gratitude. Amazon Digital Services, Inc. 2014. ASIN B00JPSS208. More recently, Hyde

== Notable activities ==
She has served on the 1998 fiction fellowship panel of the Arizona Commission on the Arts, and on the editorial staff of the Santa Barbara Review and Central Coast Magazine. She teaches workshops at the Santa Barbara, La Jolla, and Central Coast Writers Conferences.

She is founder and past president of the Pay It Forward Foundation. As a professional public speaker she has addressed the National Conference on Education, twice spoken at Cornell University, met with Americorps members at the White House, and shared a dais with Bill Clinton.

== Works ==
=== Novels ===
- Funerals for Horses (1997). "Earthquake Weather", a related short story, appears in Earthquake Weather and Other Stories (1998)
- Pay It Forward (1999; Young Reader's Edition 2014)
- Electric God (UK Edition: The Hardest Part of Love)(2000)
- Walter's Purple Heart (2002)
- Love in the Present Tense (2006)
- Becoming Chloe (2006) (Related to "Always Chloe", a novella published in the eponymous 2013 short story collection.)
- The Year of My Miraculous Reappearance (2007)
- Chasing Windmills (2008)
- The Day I Killed James (2008)
- Diary of a Witness (2009)
- When I Found You (2009)
- Second Hand Heart (2010)
- Jumpstart the World (2010)
- Don't Let Me Go (2011)
- When You Were Older (2012)
- Walk Me Home (2013)
- Where We Belong (2013)
- Take Me with You (2014)
- The Language of Hoofbeats (2014)
- Worthy (2015)
- Ask Him Why (2015)
- Leaving Blythe River (2016)
- Say Goodbye for Now (2016)
- Allie and Bea (2017)
- The Wake Up (2017)
- Heaven Adjacent (2018)
- Just After Midnight (2018)
- Have You Seen Luis Velez? (2019)
- Stay (2019)
- Brave Girl, Quiet Girl (2020)
- My Name Is Anton (2020)
- Seven Perfect Things (2021)
- Boy Underground: A Novel (2021)
- Dreaming of Flight (2022)
- So Long, Chester Wheeler (2022)
- Just a Regular Boy (2023)
- A Different Kind of Gone (2023)
- Life, Loss, and Puffins (2024)
- Rolling Toward Clear Skies (2024)
- Michael Without Apology (2025)

=== Short story collections ===
- Earthquake Weather and Other Stories (1998)
- Subway Dancer and Other Stories (2013)
- Always Chloe and Other Stories (2013). (Includes the title novella.)

=== Nonfiction ===
- 365 Days of Gratitude: Photos from a Beautiful World (2014)
- How to Be a Writer in the E-Age... and Keep Your E-Sanity (2012, with Anne R. Allen)
- The Long, Steep Path: Everyday Inspiration from the Author of Pay It Forward (2013)

=== Anthologies ===
- Best American Short Stories
- Dog Is my Co-Pilot, Crown (2003)
- Subway Dancer and Other Stories, Amazon Digital Services (2013)

== Online works ==
- Five Singing Gardeners and One Dead Stranger, nominated for Pushcart Prize
- "Hurricane Laura", Virginia Quarterly Review, Autumn 2000, pp. 721–735

== See also ==
- Leslie Feinberg
