= Martin Schneider =

German comedian and actor (born 1964)

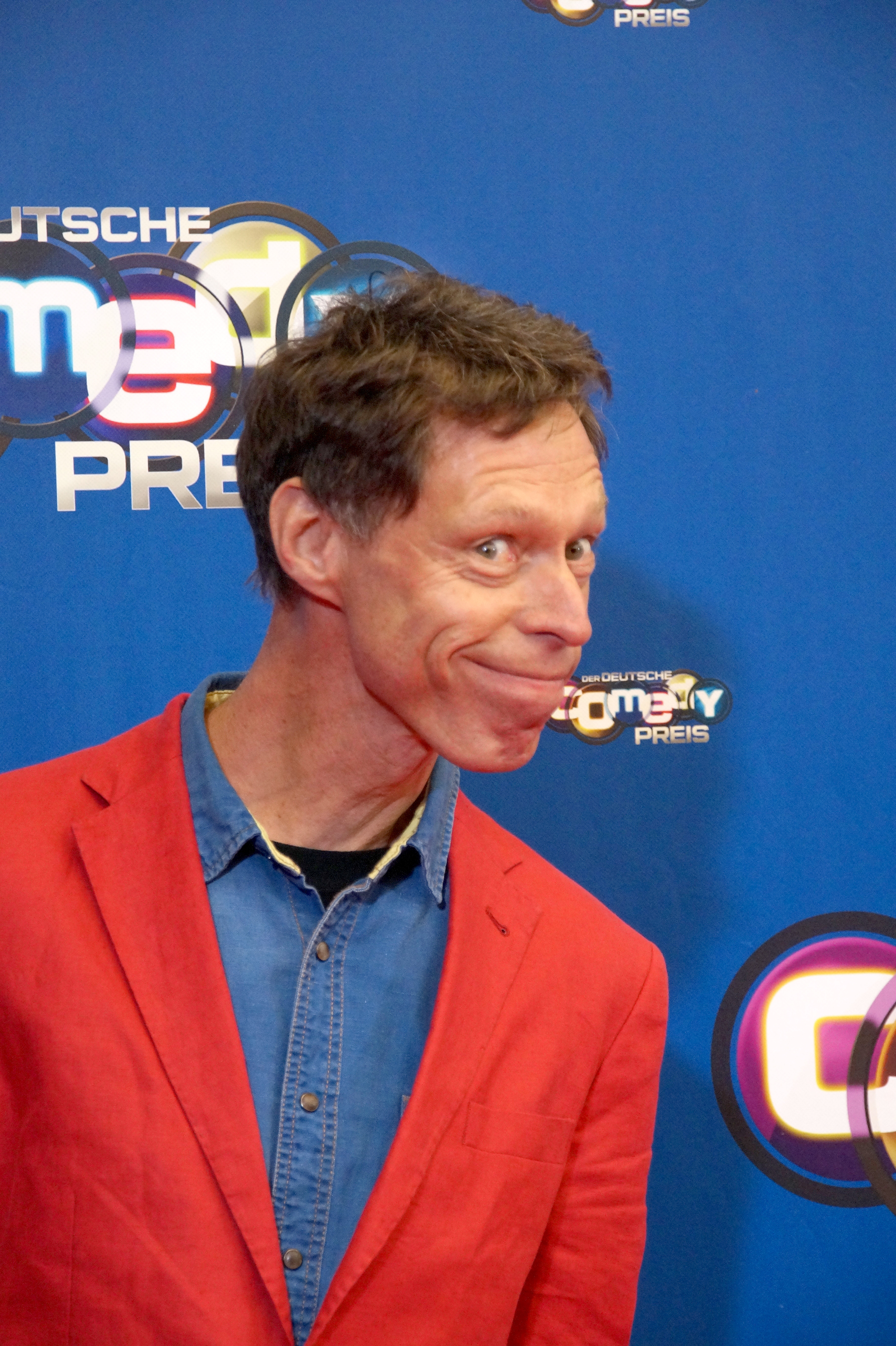
- Schneider in 2016
- Born: 25 May 1964 (age 62); Bad Homburg vor der Höhe, West Germany
- Other name: Maddin
- Occupations: Comedian, cabaret artist, actor
- Website: maddin.de

Martin Schneider (born 25 May 1964), often just called "Maddin", is a German comedian, cabaret artist and actor.

== Biography ==
Born in Bad Homburg vor der Höhe, Schneider grew up in Burgholzhausen, a district of Friedrichsdorf. He has a twin sister named Martina. Today, Schneider lives in Marburg.

At first, Schneider did an internship at the Hessischer Rundfunk. That is where he first tried doing cabaret.

In 1990, he was given his first stage job. His first programme was Gell, Sie sind spirituell? (You're Spiritual, Aren't You?).

Since 1992, Schneider has appeared in the Quatsch Comedy Club, which was still a theatre in Hamburg at that time. Later, he appeared in several television shows, including RTL Samstag Nacht and had guest appearances in 7 Tage, 7 Köpfe and Genial daneben.

He was a cast member of Comedy Factory (1996–97) on ProSieben.

Since 2004, Schneider is best friends with Cordula Stratmann in Sat.1's improvisational comedy show Schillerstraße.

Additionally, he played the dwarf "Speedy" in the October 2004 movie 7 Zwerge – Männer allein im Wald (7 Dwarves – Men Alone in the Woods) directed by Otto Waalkes, alongside Waalkes, Markus Majowski, Boris Aljinovic, Heinz Hoenig, Ralf Schmitz and Mirco Nontschew. A sequel, 7 Zwerge – Der Wald ist nicht genug (7 Dwarves – The Woods Are Not Enough), was released in October 2006.

Schneider is known for his Hessian dialect. "Aschebeschär" ("Aschenbecher" in Standard German, "ashtray" in English) has become a dictum by him. His characteristics are his quite distinctive face and his big mouth.

Schneider has released several CDs (Aschebeschär, Sischär Is Sischär!, Raggae Mann, Best of Maddin) as well as the book Im Bett mit Maddin (In Bed with Maddin).

== Filmography ==
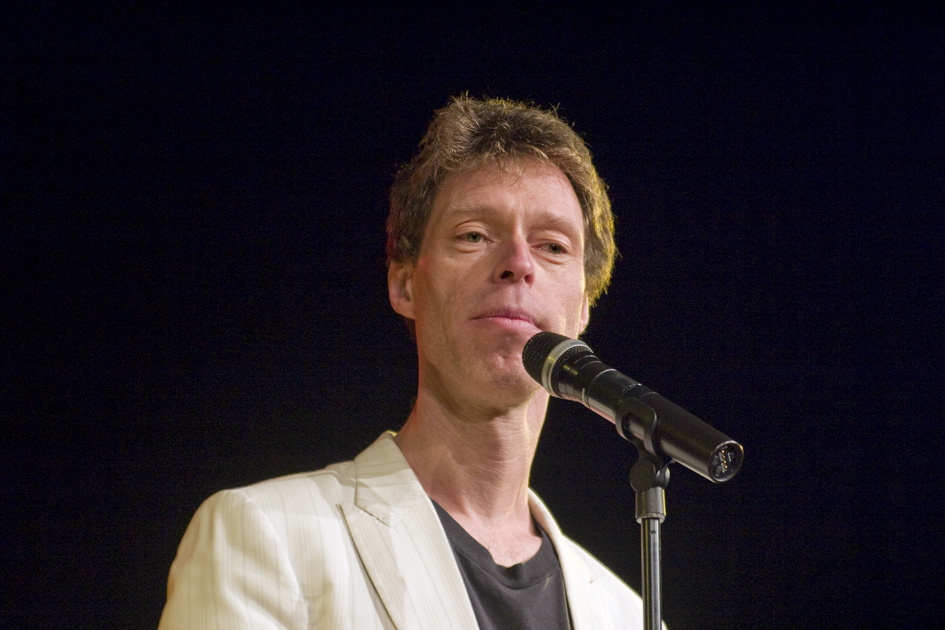
Schneider in 2009

- 1999 – Alles Bob (Everything Bob)
- 2000 – Flashback
- 2001 – Ausziehn! (Undress!)
- 2003 – Sperling und der Mann im Abseits (Sperling and the Kept Aloof) (television)
- 2004 – Germanikus (Germanicus)
- 2004 – 7 Zwerge – Männer allein im Wald (7 Dwarves – Men Alone in the Woods)
- 2004 – Crazy Race 2 – Warum die Mauer wirklich fiel (Crazy Race 2 – Why the Wall Fell Really) (television)
- 2006 – 7 Zwerge – Der Wald ist nicht genug (7 Dwarves: The Forest Is Not Enough)
- 2014 – The 7th Dwarf (Der 7bte Zwerg)
- 2015 – Kartoffelsalat – Nicht fragen!

== Literature ==
- Martin Schneider, Heidrun Buchmaier: "Im Bett mit Maddin" (In Bed with Maddin), Kurschus & Zanolli 2003, ISBN 3-86507-042-6

== See also ==
- List of German actors
- List of German comedians
- List of German writers
