= The Seventh Dwarf =

- German theatrical release poster
- Der 7bte Zwerg
- Directed by: Boris Aljinovic; Harald Siepermann
- Written by: Harald Siepermann; Daniel Welbat; Douglas Welbat
- Story by: Otto Waalkes; Bernd Eilert; Sven Unterwaldt Jr.
- Based on: Sleeping Beauty by Brothers Grimm
- Produced by: Douglas Welbat; Otto Waalkes; Bernd Eilert; Hans-Otto Mertens; Tilo Seiffert; Nikolaus Lohmann; Klaus Dohle; Matthias Triebel; Thilo Kleine
- Cinematography: Jo Heim
- Edited by: Holger Trautmann; Sascha Wolff-Täger
- Music by: Daniel Welbat; Stephan Gade
- Production companies: Zipfelmützen Film GmbH & Co. KG
- Distributed by: Universal Pictures International Germany
- Release date: 25 September 2014
- Running time: 87 minutes
- Country: Germany
- Language: German
- Box office: $15.5 million

The Seventh Dwarf (German: Der 7bte Zwerg) is a 2014 German animated musical comedy film directed by Boris Aljinovic and Harald Siepermann based upon the fairy tale Sleeping Beauty and characters from another fairy tale, Snow White and the Seven Dwarfs. It is a sequel to the films 7 Dwarves – Men Alone in the Wood (2004) and 7 Dwarves: The Forest Is Not Enough (2006), and is the first film in the series that is animated.

In the castle, Fantabularasa is a big celebration for the 18th birthday of Princess Rose, who has been cursed by the evil ice fairy, Dellamorta. If she is pricked with a sharp object before midnight, the whole kingdom will sleep for 100 years. For protection, the princess is required to wear armor. All is going well until clumsy Bobo, the seventh dwarf, makes a big mistake — and Dellamorta's curse is fulfilled. Only with a kiss of true love can the curse be lifted. Dellamorta captures the kitchen boy, Jack, who loves Rose. With the help of a dragon named Burner, the dwarves search for "Prince Charming".

The film was released in cinemas on 25 September 2014 in Germany and on 31 July 2015 in the US. The director Harald Siepermann died in February 2013 during the production of the film. It received negative reviews from critics and audiences.

== Plot ==
At Fantabularasa Castle, Princess Rose's 18th birthday is celebrated in grand style. If she doesn't prick herself on a sharp object by midnight, the curse of an evil ice fairy that puts the entire kingdom into a hundred-year sleep won't take effect. Therefore, the princess is equipped with a suit of bronze armor.

Everything goes according to plan until the clumsy Bubi, the seventh dwarf, makes a big mistake and Dellamorta's curse takes hold. To free the princess from her enforced sleep, a kiss of true love is needed. The depressed dragon Burner helps the seven-member troupe and begins the search for Prince Charming, who turns out to be the kitchen boy Jack. But he is severely punished for this by the Ice Fairy. She transforms the dragon into an ice figure and takes Jack away with her. The dwarves follow her and Bubi sadly bids a farewell to his friend Burner. As he does so, he presses his warm little hand to Burner's heart. This activates his inner flame and he begins to thaw, but the dwarves don't notice because they have already chased Jack all the way to the throne room of Fantabularasa Castle.

Bubi insists that Jack now kiss Rose, who is sleeping there. But Rose is under a magical spell cast by Dellamorta and is only freed from the spell by Bubi when he plays Rose's music box and the song reminds Jack of his true love. Dellamorta now tries by all means to prevent Jack from giving his beloved Rose the redeeming kiss. She conjures up a huge and terrifying ice figure that the little dwarves are powerless against. Bubi accidentally discovers the magic potion that the court tinkerer had prepared for her, but before he can give it to Jack, the Ice Fairy takes the bottle. The dwarves are about to give up, but suddenly Burner appears, now completely thawed and, to everyone's delight, can finally breathe fire. This melts the ice monster instantly. The dragon's fire is ineffective against Dellamorta, however, because she hurls her ice beams at him.

Amidst all the commotion, Jack tries to "fight" his way to Rose, but the Ice Fairy notices and plans to use her deadly ice beams on the kitchen boy. Bubi wants to prevent this and, not entirely intentionally but very effectively, places a large mirror between the two opponents. The beams then reflect back onto Dellamorta, transforming her into an ice figure. Now Jack can kiss Rose undisturbed, and the entire castle and its inhabitants immediately awaken from their enforced sleep.

== Cast ==
Nearly all performers of the first two films voice their characters in the German version.

Character	Voice actor (German)	Voice actor (English dub)
Princess Rose	Mia Diekow	Peyton List
Burner, the Dragon	Christian Brückner	Norm MacDonald
Dellamorta	Nina Hagen	Nina Hagen
Bobo	Ritesh Accajeea	Joshua Graham
Tschakko	Mirco Nontschew	Matt Gilbert
Cloudy	Boris Aljinovic	Al Parrish
Sunny	Ralf Schmitz	Geoff May
Cooky	Gustav Peter Wöhler	Joe Marth
Speedy	Martin Schneider	Cameron Elvin
Ralphy	Norbert Heisterkamp	Peter Karwowski
Jack, the Kitchen Boy	Henning Nöhren	James Frantowski
Snow White	Cosma Shiva Hagen	Lindsay Goodtimes
King	Peter Weck	Dave Pender

== Reception ==
On review aggregator website Rotten Tomatoes, the film holds an approval rating of 22% based on 9 reviews, and an average rating of 5/10. On Metacritic, which assigns a normalized rating to reviews, the film has a weighted average score of 20 out of 100, based on 6 critics, indicating "generally unfavorable reviews".

Deutsche Zwerge-Fans dürften nach sieben Jahren Wartezeit enttäuscht sein, denn der animierte Film ist zwar kindgerechter als die ersten beiden Filme, bietet dabei allerdings (noch) weniger witzige Momente.
German 'Dwarves fans' are likely to be disappointed after seven years of waiting, because although the animated film is more aimed at children than the first two films, it has (even) fewer funny moments.

— Filmstarts.de

Die Fans der Realfilme sollten sich klar sein, dass Der 7bte Zwerg in seinem Humor gemäßigter ist. Nina Hagen spielt die Hexe mit herrlicher Bösartigkeit. Unterm Strich gilt: Flotte Unterhaltung für Kids.
The fans of live-action films should be aware that The 7th Dwarf is more limited in its humor. Nina Hagen plays the witch with great viciousness. The bottom line is: Fast entertainment for kids.

— Kritiken.de

Sandie Angulo Chen of Common Sense Media gave the film three stars out of five, saying that "musical fairy tale has a familiar story but is fine for kids." The Staff of The Hollywood Reporter calls it the film, "a garish-looking, slapdash mashup of an animated fairy tale." It also noted that "some truly grotesque CGI animation, this utterly charmless Shout! Factory release probably will creep out kiddies […]." Justin Chang of Variety Magazine calling it "CG-animated musical mash-up of fairy tales would still be a pretty pathetic excuse for children’s entertainment," and the film "offers a witless recombination of elements from classic Grimm stories and some of the bigger U.S. toon hits of recent vintage […]." Charles Solomon of Los Angeles Times says that elements from the animated movies "ineptly stitched together into a leaden film that children will enjoy about as much as lumps in their oatmeal."

== Soundtrack ==
Der 7bte Zwerg - Das Album

Soundtrack album by Daniel Welbat
- Released: 26 September 2014
- Genre: Soundtrack
- Label: Universal Music

Track list (Soundtrack)

1. ‘Hauptthema I’
2. ‘Bakery Song’ (Kuchenback Lied)
3. ‘Kuchenschlacht’
4. ‘Hey, Dwarves ...’ (Hey Zwerge)
5. ‘Ankunft im Schloss’
6. ‘Happy Birthday’
7. ‘Dellamorta's Tango’
8. ‘Waffen!’
9. ‘Merman Rap’ (Meermänner Rap)
10. ‘Freundschaft’
11. ‘Take a Chance’ (Gib dir ne Chance)
12. ‘Pfeifen & Barbershop’
13. ‘Fairy Tales’ (Manchmal werden Märchen wahr)
14. ‘Size Doesn't Matter’
15. ‘Burner entdeckt Bubi’
16. ‘Schlittenfahrt’
17. ‘Der Hoftüftler’
18. ‘Das Drachentor’
19. ‘Geh nicht weiter’
20. ‘Schlosswalzer’
21. ‘Der Fluch’
22. ‘Eisriese’
23. ‘Hauptthema II’
