= Otto's Eleven =

2010 German family comedy film

- Theatrical release Poster
- Directed by: Sven Unterwaldt Jr.
- Written by: Bernd Eilert; Sven Unterwaldt Jr.
- Screenplay by: Otto Waalkes
- Produced by: Hans-Otto Mertens; Malte Grunert; Otto Waalkes
- Starring: Otto Waalkes; Mirco Nontschew; Rick Kavanian; Max Giermann; Arnd Schimkat; Sky du Mont; Sara Nuru; Olli Dittrich
- Cinematography: Peter von Haller
- Edited by: Stefan Essl
- Music by: Karim Sebastian Elias
- Production companies: TransWaalFilm Produktion; Warner Bros. Film Productions Germany; Zipfelmützen; Poppular Pictures
- Distributed by: Warner Bros. Pictures
- Release date: 2 December 2010
- Running time: 95 minutes
- Country: Germany
- Language: German
- Box office: $8.2 million

Otto's Eleven is a German family comedy film directed by Sven Unterwaldt Jr starring Otto Waalkes, released on 2 December 2010 by Warner Bros. Pictures.

== Plot ==
Otto is a man from a little German island, where he lives together with his friends. He gets his treasure, an expensive painting, stolen by a casino owner and his female assistant, so Otto starts travelling to the main land with his friends. Will he get it back?

== Cast ==
- Otto Waalkes as Otto
- Mirco Nontschew as Mike
- Rick Kavanian as Pit
- Max Giermann as Oskar
- Arnd Schimkat as Arthur
- Dorothea Walda as Tantchen
- Sky du Mont as Jean Du Merzac
- Stéphanie Berger as Rossdal
- Sara Nuru as Corinna
- Jennifer Weller as Ling-Lu
- Jasmin Schwiers as Jenny
- Nino Sandow as Schwarzer Peter
- Olli Dittrich as Harry Hirsch
- Sebastian Weber as Kameramann
- Hans Böhrs as Kapitän
- Paul Maximilian Schüller as Lenny
- Paula Paul as Lennys Mutter
