= Sophia Thomalla =

German media personality

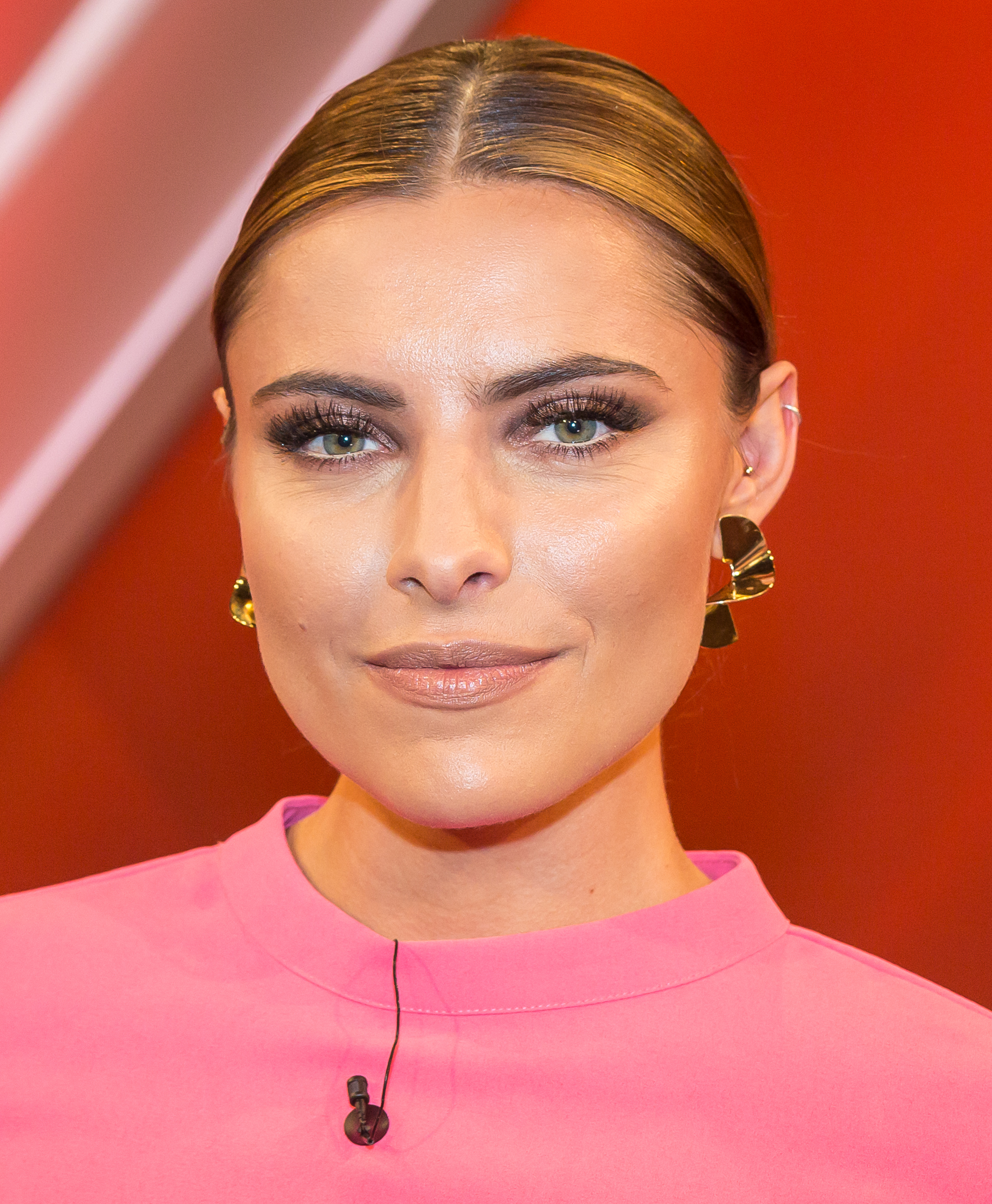
- Thomalla in 2017
- Born: 6 October 1989 (age 37); East Berlin, East Germany
- Occupations: Actress, model, TV presenter
- Years active: 2006–present
- Spouse: Andy LaPlegua (m. 2016; div. 2017)
- Relatives: Simone Thomalla (mother)

Sophia Thomalla (born 6 October 1989) is a German actress, model, and television presenter.

== Early life ==
Thomalla was born in East Berlin, East Germany on 6 October 1989, the daughter of actress Simone Thomalla and actor André Vetters. She grew up in Berlin until she was seven and moved to Cologne with her mother. After completing her fourth year of school, she and her mother moved to Kleinmachnow, then to Gelsenkirchen a year later. She also lived there after the separation of her mother from Rudi Assauer. Like her mother, Thomalla practiced kickboxing as a recreational sport; she also partook in some amateur-fights.

== Career ==
From 2007 to 2009, Thomalla attended the Constantin School for Acting, Dance, and Singing in Bochum. In 2006, she played her first television role as the daughter of Barbara Rudnik and Henry Hübchen with TV director Sigi Rothemund in the ARD crime series Commissario Laurenti.

In 2009, she applied for an open casting for the model casting show Germany's next Topmodel. In 2009 and 2010, she appeared in the Sat.1 daily soap Eine wie Keine ("One like no Other") with Chris Putzer. She was a candidate at Let's dance and won the title of Dancing Star 2010, together with her dance-partner Massimo Sinató. In 2012, Thomalla appeared in the ensemble of the comedy series Die dreisten Drei on Sat.1, alongside Oliver Beerhenke and Mirco Nontschew.

In 2010, she was ranked third in the list of FHM's Sexiest Women. Like her mother, Thomalla was photographed for the German edition of Playboy, with the pictures released in May 2012. Thomalla won first place in the online selection of Die 25 schönsten Stars in 25 Jahren ("The 25 most-beautiful Stars in 25 Years"). In the October 2015 edition of Playboy, Thomalla was portrayed together with her mother and 23 other women, including Christine Theiss, Tina Ruland, Regina Halmich, Katarina Witt, Charlotte Engelhardt, and Miriam Gössner.

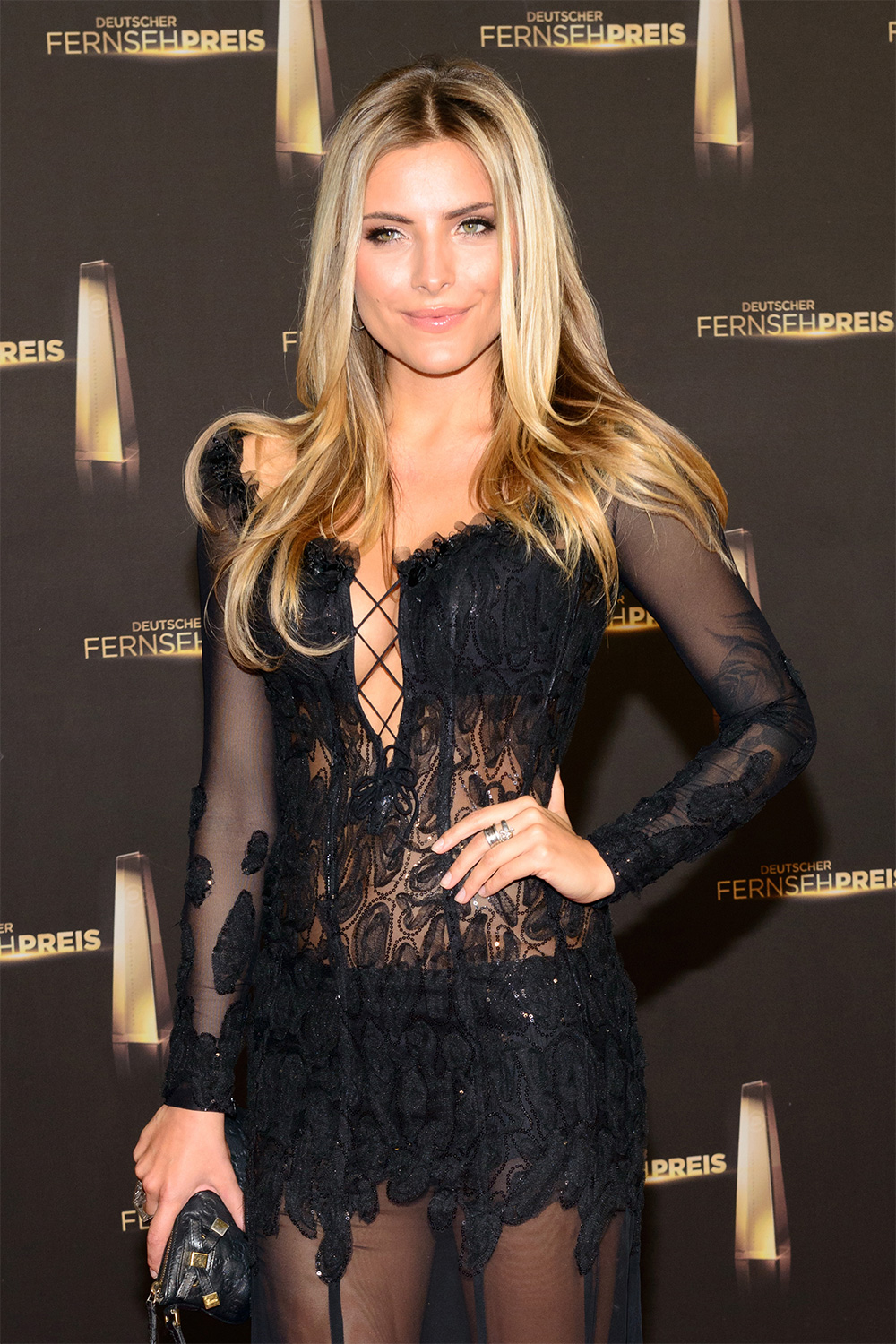
Thomalla at the German TV Awards 2014

In 2014, she advertised for the cosmetic product line of the discounter Lidl and the following year for its fashion brand. She took over additional hosting at the Wok World Cup broadcast on ProSieben in March and at the TV total Stock Car Crash Challenge in October 2015. On 30 January 2015, Thomalla hosted the 10th SemperOpernball in Dresden alongside Gunther Emmerlich. On 2 March 2015, she appeared on the talk show hart aber fair ("Tough but fair"), which dealt with the issue of gender equality. She was heavily criticized for her appearance on the show. On 8 September 2015, the issue of equality at hart aber fair in the same cast, supplemented by two other guests, was discussed again.

In 2016, Thomalla was part of the jury of the RTL dance show Dance Dance Dance, alongside DJ BoBo and Cale Kalay. Later that year, she was on the jury of the tattoo show Pain & Fame on Sixx, where the best tattoo artists in Germany competed.

== Personal life ==
Starting in 2012, Thomalla became a party member and public supporter of the Christian Democratic Union of Germany (CDU). In 2023, she declared to have left the party as the conservative CDU turned out to be too "woke" for her in the debate about misconduct allegations against her former partner, Rammstein singer Till Lindemann. Thomalla and Lindemann had dated from April 2011 to November 2015.

In the talk show Maischberger, Thomalla said about the #MeToo campaign: "I think the campaign is an insult to true rape-victims." These incidents and other comments about the #MeToo campaign sparked criticism.

On 11 March 2016, Thomalla married Norwegian singer Andy LaPlegua in Marietta, Georgia, US. In May 2017, she announced their divorce. From 2017 until 2018, Thomalla was in a relationship with British musician Gavin Rossdale. In March 2019, she began dating German football goalkeeper Loris Karius with whom she later moved to Istanbul, Turkey, where he was playing at the time. Since 2021, Thomalla has been dating German tennis-player Alexander Zverev.

== Filmography ==
- 2006–2009: Commissario Laurenti (TV series, 5 episodes)
- 2008: Unser Charly (TV series, episode: Mit allen Tricks)
- 2009: Zeit der Entscheidung - Die Soap deiner Wahl (Internet soap opera, one episode)
- 2009–2010: Eine wie keine (TV series, 3 episodes)
- 2010: Hanni & Nanni
- 2010: Countdown - Die Jagd beginnt (TV series, episode: Vom Himmel gefallen)
- 2010–2013: Der Bergdoktor (TV series, 44 episodes)
- 2011: 90 Minuten - Das Berlin-Projekt
- 2011: Der letzte Bulle (TV series, episode: Mord auf Seite 1)
- 2011: Die Trixxer
- 2012: Die Dreisten Drei - jetzt noch dreister
- 2013: Alarm für Cobra 11 - Die Autobahnpolizei (TV series, episode: Alleingang)
- 2015: Men Have to Go through This
