= Harald Siepermann =

German animator (1962–2013)

Harald Siepermann (10 June 1962 – 16 February 2013) was a German animator and character designer. His feature film credits included Who Framed Roger Rabbit, Tarzan, and Enchanted. He lectured extensively on character design and animation.

Siepermann was born in Hattingen, West Germany, in 1962. He studied illustration and art at the Folkwang University of the Arts in Essen. He then worked for advertising agencies in Düsseldorf, London, and Zurich.

He became the lead character designer for the Dutch children's television series, Alfred J. Kwak, during the 1980s. The series was based on a Dutch theatre show by Herman van Veen. Siepermann collaborated on the show's spinoff merchandise, which included comics and a line of toys, with his former Folkwang University professor, Hans Bacher, who also worked on the show. Siepermann first illustrated the title character in a 1985 poster when the theater show was running in Germany, before being used in 1987 during its performance in The Netherlands.

Siepermann's first feature film credit was for the 1988 movie, Who Framed Roger Rabbit, in which he worked as a sketch artist. He continued to work for Walt Disney Animation Studios, focusing on character design, for many of the Disney's animated features, including Mulan in 1998, Tarzan in 1999, The Emperor's New Groove in 2000, Treasure Planet in 2002, Brother Bear in 2003, and the 2007 live action film, Enchanted. His animated film credits outside of Disney included Amblimation's We're Back! A Dinosaur's Story in 1993; the Belgian-German work, Jester Till, in 2003; and Space Chimps in 2008. 2010-2013 he worked on his first directorial venture, the animated film The 7th Dwarf.

Harald Siepermann died of cancer on 16 February 2013, at the age of 50.
