= Hausmeister Krause – Ordnung muss sein =

2000s German sitcom

- Genre: Sitcom
- Starring: Tom Gerhardt - Dieter Krause Irene Schwarz - Lisbeth Krause Janine Kunze - Carmen Krause Axel Stein - Tommie Krause
- Country of origin: Germany
- No. of seasons: 8
- No. of episodes: 80

Original release
- Network: Sat.1
- Release: 18 January 1999 – 2 September 2010

Hausmeister Krause – Ordnung muss sein (lit. Janitor Krause – Order is essential) is a German sitcom created and written by and starring Tom Gerhardt in the title role that ran from 1999 to 2010 on Sat.1.

== Synopsis ==
The series parodies typical German squareness and fuddy-duddines. Half-day caretaker Dieter Krause is the embodiment of the German "square"; he is pernickety, blindly follows order, denounces others, is nosy, consistently puts his own interests above all else, acts subservient to his superiors and is brutish and unjust to those he deems below him.

He has an obsession with dachshunds, and spends most of his leisure time working for the local dachshund club Dackelclub KTC (Kölner Teckel Club) 1881 e.V.. This club is a satire on typical German club life as well as on German obedience to rules and authorities, as it is very militaristic, has a strict order of rules and formalities and is strictly ruled by order, authority, hierarchy and loyalty.

Many plot elements—mishaps, misunderstandings, and cases of mistaken identity—originate from Boulevard theatre. Often Dieter's racist and homophobic misconceptions cause him to make errors in judgement that cost him greatly. The only time his prejudices are remotely accurate is when it concerns drug users, but when he calls the police they remember his previous prejudices and ignore him. The characters in the series borrow heavily from those in Tom Gerhardt's film Voll normaaal, in many cases sharing names. The Krause family are also all characters he has performed on stage in his standup comedy sketches. In Voll normaaal, Tom Gerhardt played the roles of both Dieter and Tommie Krause; in Hausmeister Krause, the alcohol and sex obsessed manchild Tommie was played by Axel Stein and the comically promiscuous daughter Carmen is played by Janine Kunze. Other characters from Voll normaaal, such as Tommie's friend Mario, are relegated to the status of background characters. The scope of action also changed.
