= Animals United =

- German theatrical release poster.
- Directed by: Reinhard Klooss; Holger Tappe
- Written by: Oliver Huzly; Reinhard Kloos
- Based on: Die Konferenz der Tiere by Erich Kästner
- Produced by: Reinhard Klooss; Holger Tappe
- Starring: German: Ralf Schmitz; Thomas Fritsch; English: James Corden; Billie Piper; Omid Djalili; Jason Donovan; Dawn French; Stephen Fry; Jim Broadbent; Andy Serkis; Vanessa Redgrave; Joanna Lumley
- Edited by: Alexander Dittner
- Music by: David Newman
- Production companies: Constantin Film; Ambient Entertainment; Timeless Films; White Horse Pictures
- Distributed by: Constantin Film
- Release date: 7 October 2010
- Running time: 93 minutes
- Country: Germany
- Language: German
- Box office: 51,8 Mio $ (worldwide)

Animals United is a 2010 German animated adventure comedy film directed and produced by Reinhard Klooss and Holger Tappe and released on 7 October 2010. The film stars Ralf Schmitz and Thomas Fritsch as a meerkat named Billy and a lion named Socrates, who go on an epic quest to discover why their river has unexpectedly dried up. It is loosely based on the 1949 book The Animals' Conference by Erich Kästner and Walter Trier. This is the second adaptation as the first adaptation was a 2D-animated film, which was also the first German animated feature film to be in color that was released in 1969. The screenplay for the film was written by Oliver Huzly and Reinhard Kloos. An English-language dub version for Animals United stars an ensemble British cast, including James Corden, Stephen Fry and Andy Serkis.

A sequel, Pets United, was released in 2019, which exclusively brought the sequel to Netflix.

== Plot ==
In the Okavango Delta, the annual flood has failed to arrive in the Delta. The water has become scarce and the native animals including a herd of rhinos and buffaloes, including Chino and Biggie, fiercely fight over it. A grey meerkat named Billy and a lion named Socrates set out to find more water, and during their quest they enter a scary and dingy place called "The Valley of Death" and then are met by a rag-tag group of animals from across the world: a polar bear named Sushi, a kangaroo named Toby, a Tasmanian devil named Smiley, two Galápagos tortoises named Winifred and Winston, and a rooster named Charles, all of whom have had their lives ruined by humans in some way and have travelled to Africa. That night, Socrates tells Billy the tragic story of how he and his brother Mambo entered "The Valley of Death" and how Mambo was shot a strange poacher. The next morning, the animals discover the reason for the lack of water in the Delta: a dam has been constructed to supply energy for a luxury resort called the Eden Paradise Hotel which is for the Climate Conference owned by a man named Mr. Smith. The animals meet a chimpanzee named Toto who is the hotel's mascot, Toto helps the animals get their water back, however, a poacher named Hunter kidnaps Socrates, while the other animals escape.

The animals hold a conference where Winifred and Winston explain the deadly future that could be possible for animals. After the conference, however, Winifred and Winston pass away. That day, Billy and the other animals travel through "The Valley of Death" towards the dam. Hunter spots the animals and tries to stop them with a bi-plane, but is stopped by Toto. The animals then began to send a message by letting a swarm of locusts teach the humans a lesson for stealing the water by eating everything in their conference room, including their documents and their clothes. Billy rescues Socrates and they escape down a chute with the help from Toto. The animals chase Hunter and threaten to lower him to the den of tigers if he doesn't tell them why he blocked the water, ending with Billy knocking the poacher out. The water then comes out of the dam making everyone celebrate the return of the water and invite Toto to live with them. There they go to the city to hold humans accountable.

== Characters ==
=== Meerkats ===
- Billy is an adventurous, clumsy, easily scared but good-hearted meerkat who wants to find water to drink - to collect which he carries a bottle made out of an orange gourd, complete with cork. He also likes to golf, drum and sing.
- Bonnie - Billy's wife and loyal but concerned member of the meerkat family. She has tan fur and light brown eyes compared to her husband's gray fur and green eyes.
- Junior - the son of Billy and Bonnie who aspires to do some of the things his father does, such as collecting water in a gourd.
- Other meerkats - often tease Junior about his father's promise, but are convinced at the end.

=== Other animals ===
- Socrates - A vegetarian lion with a scar on his face and Billy's best friend.
- Angie - The elephant with blond hair tied in a ponytail.
- Giselle - A reticulated giraffe with makeup on her face and blond bangs on her head. She is also Angie's best friend.
- Winston - An elderly male Galápagos tortoise who has been alive for more than 700 years. He's 12 years older than his wife, Winifred. He dies shortly before the climax of the film.
- Winifred - An elderly female Galápagos tortoise and Winston's wife who is also more than 700 years old. She and her husband die shortly before the film's climax.
- Charles - The French-accented rooster who leads the other animals on some revolution against human oppression, originally served as food on a cruise ship.
- Sushi - A polar bear who has escape from her home because of global warming.
- Toby - A kangaroo with an obsession for canned beer.
- Ken - A hippie koala who's been rescued after the outback on fire.
- Smiley - The Tasmanian devil whom Toby befriends. In addition to his lack of intelligence, clumsiness and inability to speak, Smiley is notorious for his terrible flatulence, but he is also caring, friendly and loyal.
- Toto - The chimpanzee who served as an animal test subject at the hotel.
- Biggie - A red-haired southern white rhinoceros who fights Chino in a butting over water.
- Chino - An African Buffalo who fights Biggie.
- Bob - The aardvark who trumpets like an elephant.
- The Leopard - A black panther who lives in the canyon.
- Bongo - A maroon leaf monkey that works as a hairdresser for other animals and also poses as an oracle.

=== Humans ===
- Mr. Smith - the tour guide of the hotel who initially cares nothing more but making money. At the end, when the animals have got their water back, his hotel goes bankrupt.
- Maya Smith - Smith's animal-loving daughter.
- Hunter - an unnamed selfish and unscrupulous poacher, the main antagonist.

== Voice cast ==
=== German ===
- Ralf Schmitz as Billy
- Thomas Fritsch as Sokrates
- Bastian Pastewka as Angie
- Bianca Krahl as Gisela
- Margot Rothweiler as Winifred
- Peter Gröger as Winston
- Constantin von Jascheroff as Erdmännchen
- Nicola Devico Mamone as Chino
- Christoph Maria Herbst as Hahn Charles
- Oliver Kalkofe as Hoteldirektor Smith
- Frank Schaff as Erdmännchen
- Tilo Schmitz as Nashorn Biggie
- Santiago Ziesmer as Affiger Friseur Bongo

=== English dub ===
- James Corden as Billy
- Stephen Fry as Socrates
- Dawn French as Angie
- Joanna Lumley as Giselle
- Jim Broadbent as Winston
- Vanessa Redgrave as Winifred
- Billie Piper as Bonnie
- Tom Wayland as Bob
- Andy Serkis as Charles
- Jason Donovan as Toby
- Omid Djalili as Bongo
- Mischa Goodman as Junior
- Bella Hudson as Sushi
- Oliver Green as Ken
- Jason Griffith as Toto
- Sean Schemmel as Biggie
- Marc Thompson as Chino
- Oliver Wyman as Smiley
- Ruben Lloyd, Jimmy Zoppi and Gary McHenley as vultures
- Michael Glover as Mr. Smith
- Kim Holland as Maya Smith
- Veronica Taylor as The Mole
- Marc Diraison as Peter Cook the TV News Reporter
- Doug Preis as Hunter

== Production ==
The film's production began on 22 November 2008 and ended on 22 June 2010; animation was provided by the Hannover-based studio Ambient Entertainment using Autodesk-owned software. The film had over 1.5 million viewers in German cinemas. There were over 5 million visitors across Europe, including more than a million in France. It grossed over $50 million worldwide.

== Release ==
Animals United was released in theaters on 7 October 2010 in Germany.

=== Home media ===
This film was released on Blu-ray and DVD in the US on 3 April 2012 in Walmart, and elsewhere on 5 June, by Arc Entertainment.

== Reception ==
Reviews for the film were generally unfavourable, with the aggregation website Rotten Tomatoes reporting that 25% of eight critics have given the film a positive review, with an average rating 3.8 out of 10. A review in The Hollywood Reporter described the film as a "bombastic CGI-effort that aims at the big leagues, but preaches too much while entertaining too little to unite internationally."

== Soundtrack ==
Animals United (Original Soundtrack)

Soundtrack album by Various Artists
- Released: 7 December 2010
- Recorded: 2010
- Genres: Film soundtrack, pop, rock
- Length: 40:50
- Label: Königskinder Music
- Producer: David Newman

The soundtrack album for the film was composed by David Newman. It features songs performed by various artists, including Naturally 7, Charles Trénet and Xavier Naidoo. It was released on 7 December 2010 in Germany through Königskinder Music in CD and digital download formats, and is also available on iTunes.

=== Track listing ===
All musical score tracks for the film written and composed by David Newman, except where noted.

No.	Title	Performer(s)	Length
1.	"Animal Paradise"		1:52
2.	"Golfing with Caca"		1:38
3.	"King of the Road"	Naturally 7	3:56
4.	"Splish Splash"	Naturally 7	2:13
5.	"Animals March"		1:03
6.	"Billy the Scatterbrain"		1:07
7.	"La Mer"	Charles Trénet	3:24
8.	"No Water"		2:17
9.	"Drumming for Water"		2:33
10.	"A New Horizon"	Xavier Naidoo & Naturally 7	3:04
11.	"Socrates Tells the Story"		3:15
12.	"Move On Up"	Naturally 7	3:51
13.	"Hokey Pokey"	Naturally 7	2:26
14.	"Tales of the Humans"		5:43
15.	"Animals in New York"		2:16
16.	"A New Horizon (Vocal Play Version)"	Xavier Naidoo & Naturally 7	2:52
Total length:			40:50

Note: Roger Thomas of Naturally 7 provides Billy's singing voice for tracks 3 and 4.
