= Mathias Schlung =

German musical actor and comedian (born 1971)

Mathias Schlung (born 11 May 1971 in Göttingen) is a German musical actor and comedian.

After training at the Max-Reinhardt-Seminar in Vienna, he performed in the Sat.1 programs Die Dreisten Drei, Happy Friday, Nicola, and The Comedy Trap. He is also well known for his participation in Polizeiruf 110. He served until May 2007 as a professor in the Abronsius musical Dance of the Vampires. He also appeared as Abahachi in the musical Der Schuh des Manitu.

As part of the 2009 Nibelungenfestspiele in Worms, he performed in The Life of Siegfried („Das Leben des Siegfried“).
