= Olm unterwegs =

- Starring: Hans Werner Olm
- Country of origin: Germany

Olm unterwegs is a German television series that aired from January 15, 2006, to October 15, 2007, on ProSieben. Created and led by Hans Werner Olm, the show blends satire, outlandish humor and portrayal of eccentric characters by Olm himself. The show has two seasons and 17 episodes.

== See also ==
- List of German television series
