= Mirco Nontschew =

German comedian (1969–2021)

- Born: October 29, 1969; East Berlin, East Germany
- Died: December 3, 2021 (aged 52)
- Occupations: Actor; comedian

Mirco Nontschew (29 October 1969 – c. 3 December 2021) was a German comedian. He gained recognition for his role in the German comedy television series RTL Samstag Nacht (1993–1998).

== Early life ==
Nontschew was born in East Berlin, on 29 October 1969. His father Vasko Nontschew was a musician who had emigrated to East Germany from Bulgaria and his mother was a journalist. Following his parents' wishes, he learned to be a mechanic in the VEB Medizinische Geräte Berlin. On 28 July 1989, he first appeared on stage as a beatboxer and breakdancer with his group "Downtown Lyrics" in Radebeul near Dresden. He also played piano and drums. Shortly afterwards, he emigrated to West Germany.

== Career ==
In 1993, he was approached by Hugo Egon Balder, who was then looking for comedians for his new comedy television series RTL Samstag Nacht. Nontschew was the first person cast, mainly due to his talent of imitating sounds. He was a member of the sketch show for its entire run from 1993 to 1998.

In 2001, Nontschew was given his own show Mircomania alongside Janine Kunze on Sat.1. He later appeared in the German comedy films 7 Dwarves – Men Alone in the Wood (2004) and 7 Dwarves: The Forest Is Not Enough (2006) as well as other films.

From 2005, he was a frequent guest in the improvisational comedy show Frei Schnauze and in 2012, he partnered up with Sophia Thomalla as well as fellow comedian Oliver Beerhenke for a reboot of the Sat.1 show Die Dreisten Drei.

His last appearances were in 2021 as a contestant on two seasons of the Bully Herbig show LOL: Last One Laughing. He also appeared in the third season released four months after his death. The season was dedicated to him.

== Personal life ==
Nontschew had two daughters, one with his ex-wife Melanie Nontschew and one with his girlfriend Monique Bredow. He died on, or shortly before, 3 December 2021, at the age of 52.
