= Rüdiger Hoffmann =

German comedian (born 1964)

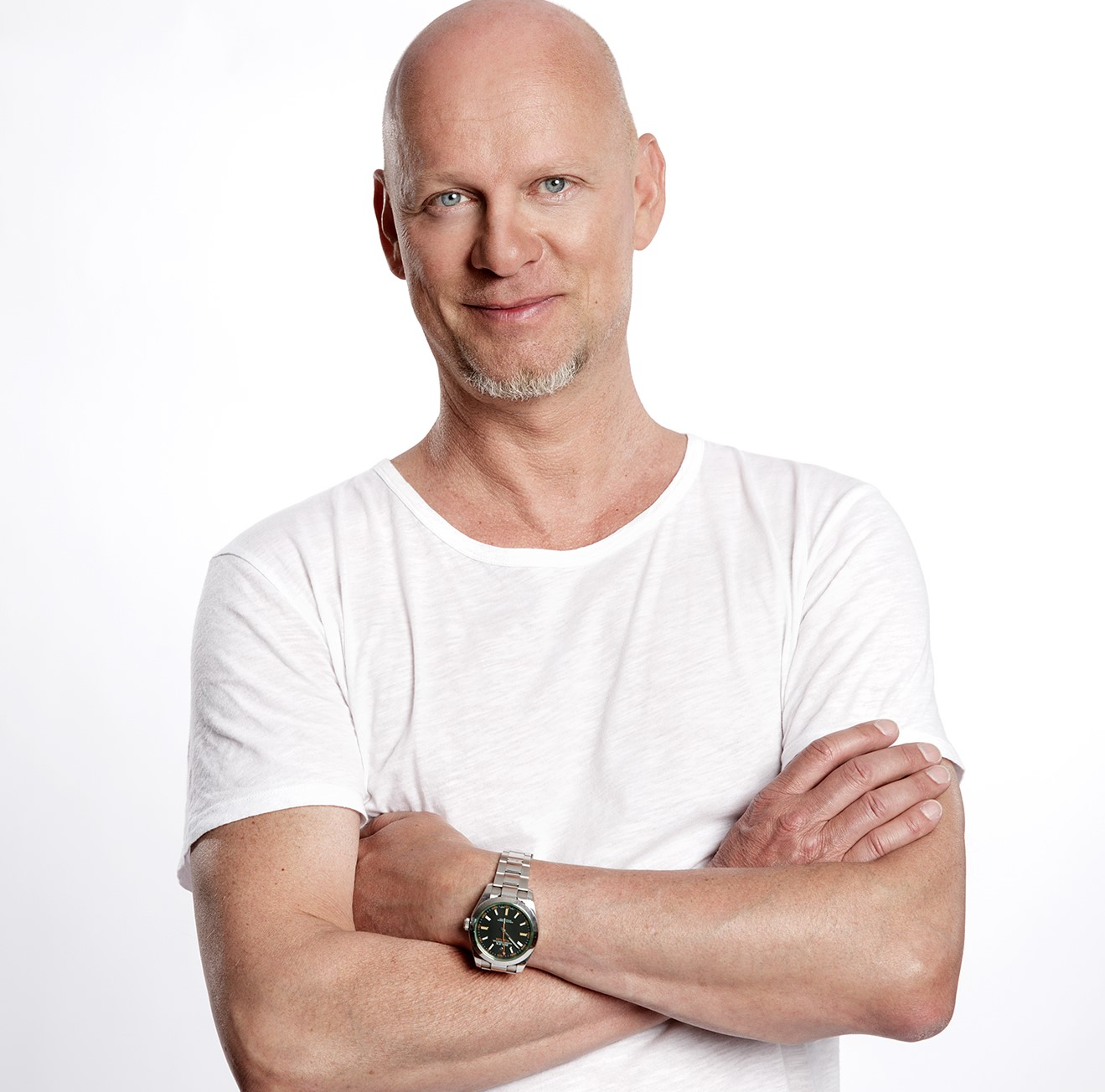
Rüdiger Hoffmann

Rüdiger Hoffmann (born March 30, 1964, in Paderborn) is a German comedian.

== Life ==
Hoffmann works as comedian on German television.

== Comedian Works by Hoffmann ==
- 1995: Der Hauptgewinner
- 1997: Es ist furchtbar aber es geht (with Jürgen Becker)
- 1998: Asien. Asien.
- 2000: Ich komme...!
- 2003: Ekstase
- 2005: Kostbarkeiten – Das Beste aus 5 Programmen
- 2006: Rüdiger Hoffmann – Das Beste vom Besten live
- 2007: Der Atem des Drachen
- 2007: Sex oder Liebe
- 2010: Das beste aus 25 Jahren
- 2010: Obwohl
- 2015: Aprikosenmarmelade

== Films ==
- 2004: 7 Dwarves – Men Alone in the Wood
- 2006: 7 Zwerge – Der Wald ist nicht genug

== Awards ==
- 1989: St. Ingberter Pfanne
- 1994: Salzburger Stier
- 1996: Goldene Schallplatte for Der Hauptgewinner
- 1999: Goldene Europa in category Comedy
- 1999: Echo in category Comedy
- 2003: Goldene Schallplatte for Ich komme …!
