= Tom Gerhardt =

German comedian and actor

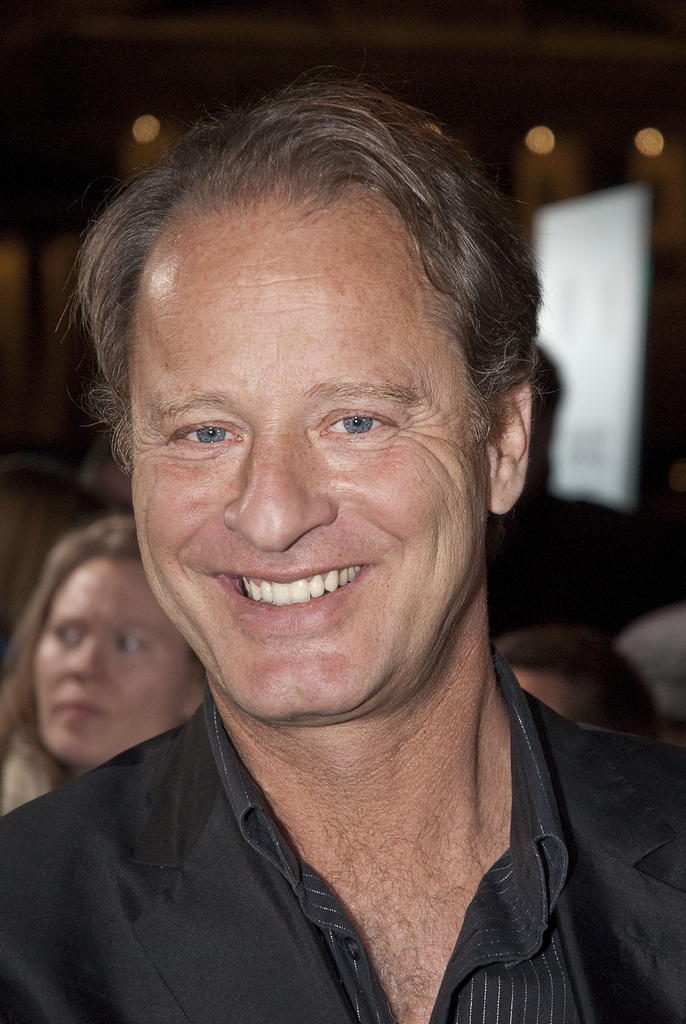
Tom Gerhardt, Berlinale 2008

Tom Gerhardt (born 12 December 1956) is a German actor and comedian.

== Life ==
Gerhardt was born in Cologne, and studied German studies and philosophy. After his university studies, Gerhardt worked for German newspaper Express in Cologne. Since the 1990s, he has worked as an actor in different films.

== Filmography ==
- 1994: Voll normaaal
- 1997: Ballermann 6
- 1998: The Polar Bear
- 2003: Pura Vida Ibiza
- 2004: Germanikus
- 2004: Resident Evil: Apocalypse
- 2005: 7 Dwarves – Men Alone in the Wood
- 2005: Siegfried
- 2009: Dinosaurier – Gegen uns seht ihr alt aus!
- 2010: Freche Mädchen 2
- 2011: Die Superbullen
- 2011: Der Blender
- 2012: Agent Ranjid rettet die Welt
- 2013: Der Schluff und das Geheimnis der goldenen Taschenuhr
- 2014: Nachbarn süß-sauer (Fernsehfilm)
- 2015: Schmidts Katze
- 2016: Volltreffer (Fernsehfilm)
- 2017: Ritter Rost 2 – Das Schrottkomplott (Stimme)
- 2018: Verpiss dich, Schneewittchen

=== Television comedy series ===
- 1999–2010: Hausmeister Krause – Ordnung muss sein
