= Simone Thomalla =

German actress (born 1965)

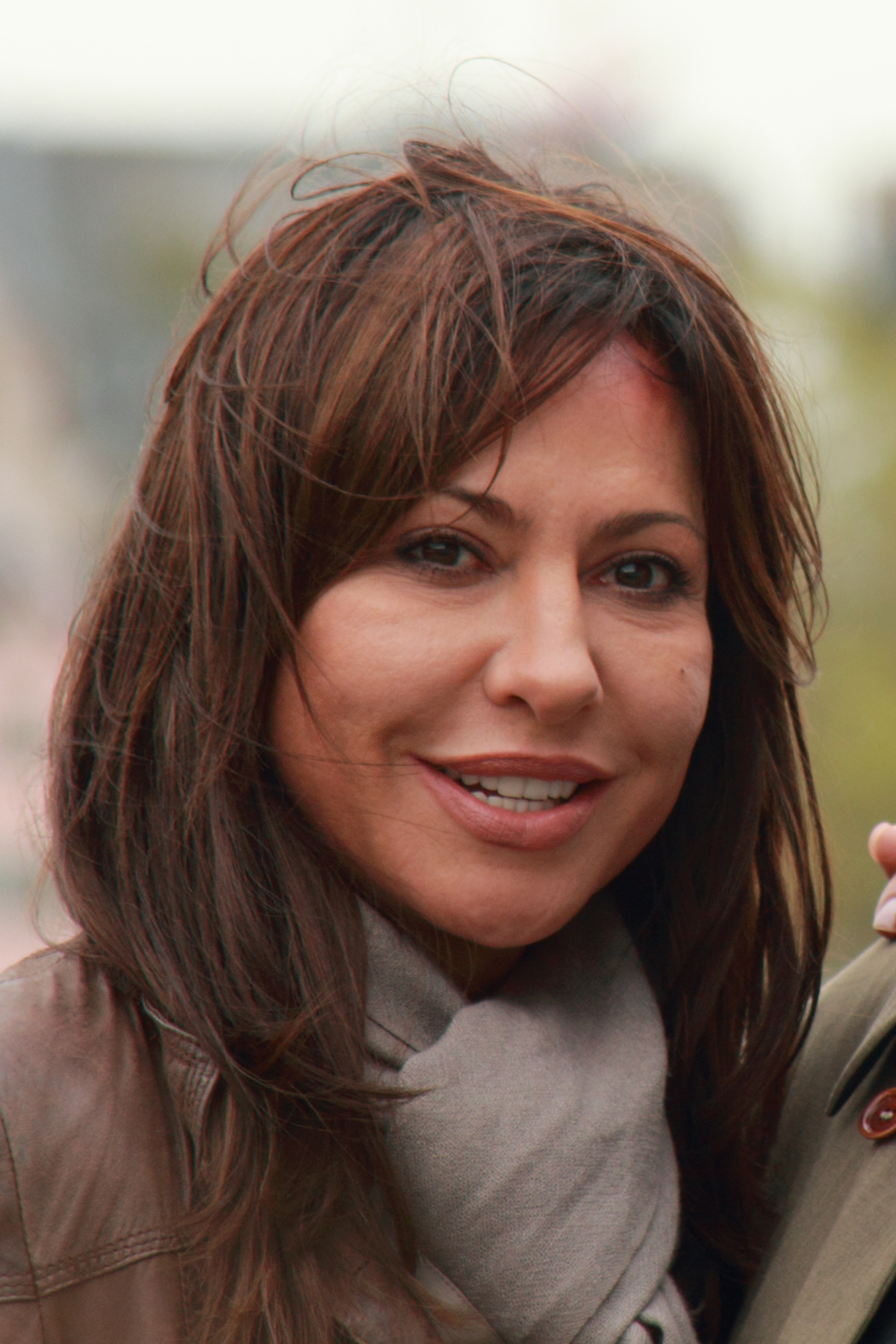
- Born: 11 April 1965 (age 61); Leipzig, East Germany
- Occupation: Actress
- Years active: 1982-present
- Spouse: André Vetters (m. 1991; div. 1995)
- Partner(s): Rudi Assauer (2000–2009); Silvio Heinevetter (2009–2021)
- Children: Sophia Thomalla

Signature
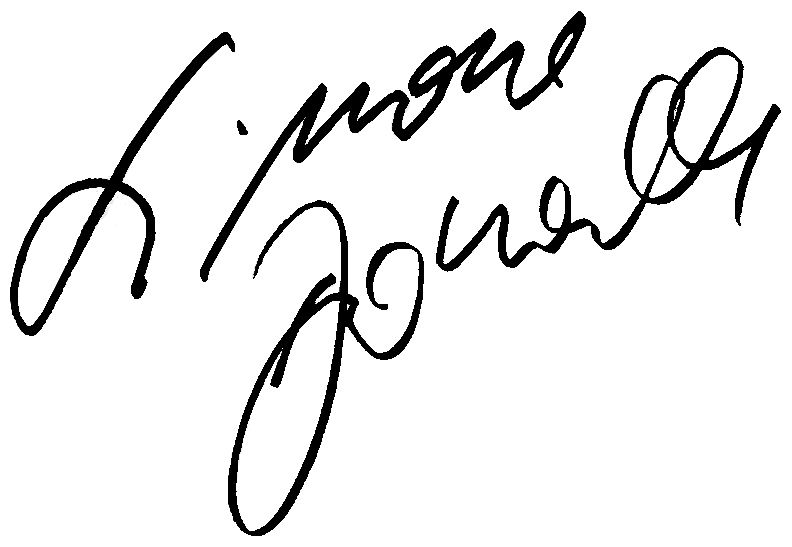

Simone Thomalla (born 11 April 1965) is a German actress.

== Career ==
As a child, Thomalla wanted to be a musician, but instead attended the Hochschule für Schauspielkunst Ernst Busch acting-school in Berlin. She began her career in 1982 in East-Germany, with the movie Abgefunden. Since then, she has had many roles in a variety of German movies and TV-series. Thomalla is well-known for appearing in commercials. She won the Goldene Kamera together with Rudi Assauer for her Veltins commercial. She played detective Eva Saalfeld in the German TV-series Tatort, as well as other roles. Playboy Germany published photos of Thomalla in their February 2010 edition.

== Personal life ==
Thomalla is the daughter of architect Alfred Thomalla. She grew up in Potsdam, East-Germany.

She gave birth to her daughter Sophia Thomalla during the East German revolution of 1989.

From 1991 to 1995, Thomalla was married to actor André Vetters. From 2000 to 2009, she was in a relationship with German soccer executive Rudi Assauer. Since 2009, she has been in a relationship with handball player Silvio Heinevetter.
