= 7 Dwarves: The Forest Is Not Enough =

2006 film

- Film poster
- German: 7 Zwerge – Der Wald ist nicht genug
- Directed by: Sven Unterwaldt
- Written by: Bernd Eilert; Sven Unterwaldt; Otto Waalkes
- Produced by: Douglas Welbat
- Cinematography: Peter von Haller
- Edited by: Norbert Herzner
- Music by: Joja Wendt
- Distributed by: Universal Pictures (though United International Pictures)
- Release date: 26 October 2006
- Running time: 95 minutes
- Country: Germany
- Language: German

7 Dwarves: The Forest Is Not Enough (original German title 7 Zwerge – Der Wald ist nicht genug) is a 2006 German comedy film directed by Sven Unterwaldt. It is a sequel to the film 7 Zwerge – Männer allein im Wald. The film is based on the fairy tale "Rumpelstiltskin" and characters from "Snow White and the Seven Dwarfs". Its title is a pun on "Die Welt ist nicht genug", the German title of the James Bond film The World Is Not Enough.

== Plot ==
Hansel and Gretel are lost in the forest. A disgusting humanlike creature scares them and they wander into the deep wood. When Bubi shows up and asks the creature for his name, the creature only reveals to be "The Evil One". Bubi sneakily follows the creature and witnesses how he dances around a fire singing a song in which he mentions his real name.

The story moves to the castle where Snow White lives, now a mother. Her husband, the jester, left a year ago to buy some cigarettes in a nearby shop. Snow White wonders why this takes so long. The Evil One enters the castle and claims the child. The day before Spliss, one of Snow White guards, rescued The Evil One from a trap. The Evil One rewarded Spliss by giving him a wish. Spliss wished to have a beautiful haircut which he got, but he did not like the color and wanted to have it blond. The Evil One agreed on condition Spliss signs a contract so Snow White's child will become his property. Snow White asks for the contract to be undone. The Evil One promises to relinquish his claim if someone can reveal his real name within 48 hours.

Snow White visits the dwarves' cabin but only Bubi still lives there. He explains this is her own fault. Some time ago she visited the dwarves in search of a new husband with a successful career. Not much later all dwarves left except Bubi. Snow White can't remember her visit. Snow White asks Bubi to reunite the dwarves and to find the name of The Evil One.

The six other dwarves work in a nearby town. Cookie, Cloudy and Sunny are innkeepers, Speedy is a firefighter, Ralfie is a brewer, Tschakko is an exterminator. Bubi persuades them to help Snow White. Their only possible help could come from The Wise Grey, but he has left for "The Fishing Palace" in another world. The dwarves find the former queen's magical mirror which transports them to the other world: modern Germany.

In the meantime, The Evil One arrives at the candy house of the witch, who is actually the former queen. She suffers from memory problems and always forgets the real name of The Evil One. So he writes it down on a paper: Rumpelstiltskin. He puts the paper in an envelope and hides it in the witch's conjuring book. The Evil One tells Snow White her baby will soon be his although he is afraid someone is in search for his real name. Through her crystal ball the witch discovers the dwarves' mission. Still mad at them and Snow White, she sends the shapeshifting Evil One to the other world to thwart it.

The dwarves find The Wise Grey in some sort of fish and chips stand. He does know The Evil One but never heard his real name. He tells them to look for it in the candy house. The dwarves return to their own world by using a magic mirror in the railway station.

The dwarves head to the candy house where they use a ruse to obtain the envelope with The Evil One's real name. They all go to Snow White. However, they were tricked into taking the wrong envelope and now believe the real name is Mother Hulda. They realize it was not Snow White who visited them to tell she is in search for a new man, but The Evil One. Eventually, Bubi says the real name is Rumpelstiltskin. He knew this the whole time and tried to tell but nobody let him speak. The dwarves also meet their former head dwarf Brummboss who became a king at the end of the first film. The king asks if he can become a dwarf again. This is rejected by the others as there are already seven dwarves.

== Cast ==
- Otto Waalkes as Bubi
- Mirco Nontschew as Tschakko
- Gustav Peter Wöhler as Cookie
- Martin Schneider as Speedy
- Boris Aljinovic as Cloudy
- Ralf Schmitz as Sunny
- Norbert Heisterkamp as Ralfie
- Axel Neumann as Rumpelstiltskin
- Cosma Shiva Hagen as Snow White
- Hans Werner Olm as Spliss
- Nina Hagen as witch
- Heinz Hoenig as king Brummboss
- Christian Tramitz as hunter
- Rüdiger Hoffmann as Ghost in the mirror
- Helge Schneider as The Wise Grey
- Olli Dittrich as Pinocchio
