= Joja Wendt =

German jazz pianist and composer

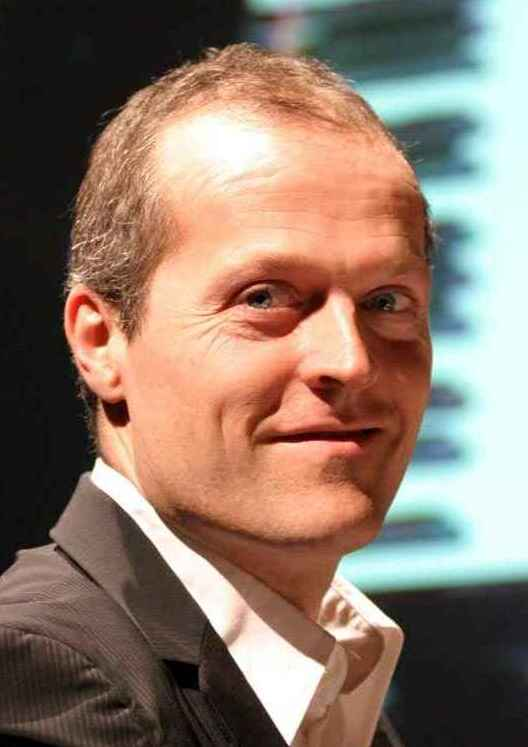
Wendt in 2005

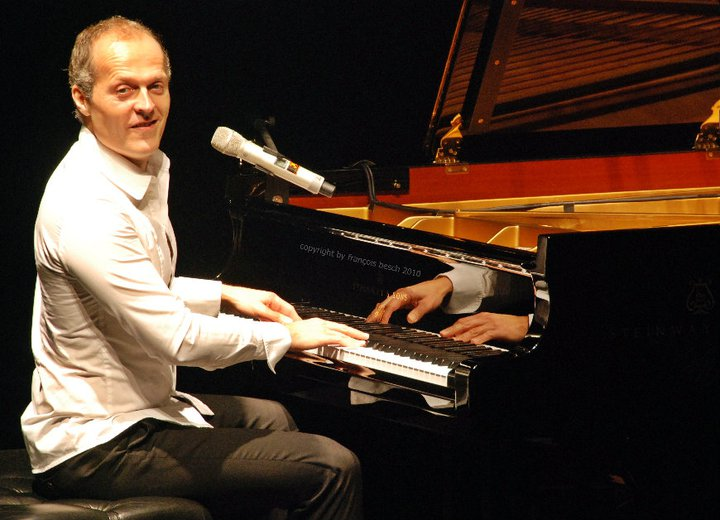
Wendt in Echternach, Luxembourg, in 2011

Joja Wendt (born 31 July 1964 as Johan Wendt) is a German jazz pianist and composer.

== Education and early career ==
Wendt was born in Hamburg. The son of a female singer and a doctor, he began playing the piano at the age of four. He decided soon after leaving school at the Lise-Meitner-Gymnasium in Osdorf, Hamburg to turn to jazz. He then played regularly in the Hamburg music pub Sperl, where he was discovered by Joe Cocker. Cocker took Wendt as the opening act of his tour of Germany, so he became known quickly throughout the country.

Important stations were concerts with Chuck Berry, whose Germany tour he accompanied on the piano, or with the band Pur in the sold-out Arena Auf Schalke, and the soundtrack to 7 Zwerge – Männer allein im Wald. After working in the Dutch town of Hilversum and studying in New York City, he returned to Hamburg, where he now lives with his wife and two children in Groß Flottbek. In addition to his passion for jazz, blues and boogie-woogie, he also cares about early musical education of children.

== Awards ==
Wendt was awarded a Louis Armstrong student award and has been included in the circle of Steinway artists by Steinway & Sons.

== Discography ==
- The Art Of Boogie-Woogie (1991)
- Cookin' (1992)
- Live (1993)
- Fifty-Fifty (1994) (feat. Inga Rumpf)
- Good Morning Blues (1995) (feat. Abi Wallenstein)
- The Art Of Early Jazz Piano (1996)
- In The 25th Hour (1996) (feat. Inga Rumpf)
- Blues On Air (1997) (feat. Abi Wallenstein)
- Live At Lloyds (1997) (feat. Inga Rumpf)
- Pacifique (1997) (feat. Les McCann)
- hummelflug.de (1998)
- L'Eglise (1999)
- Der Pianist (2000)
- Showtime (2002)
- Live! ... sehr schwer zu spielen (2003)
- The Grand Piano (2005)
- Mit 88 Tasten um die Welt (2007)
- Im Zeichen der Lyra (2011)
- Joja´s Klaviermusik (2016)

== Filmography ==
- 2004: 7 Zwerge - Männer allein im Wald
- 2005: Zibb
- 2006: Hermann & Tietjen
- 2006: 7 Zwerge - Der Wald ist nicht genug
- 2007: Volle Kanne
- 2007 - 2008: DAS!
- 2008: Happy Otto - Wir haben Grund zum Feiern ...
- 2008: Dein Song
- 2008: Wetten, dass..?
- 2008: Joja Wendt - Mit 88 Tasten um die Welt: Live
- 2008: Ein Abend für ...
- 2009: NDR Talk Show
- 2013: Heinz Erhardt ist Kult! Der große Humorist und sein Erbe
- 2013: Krömer - Late Night Show
- 2013: Deutschlands Superhirn
