= Rudi Assauer =

German football player and executive (1944–2019)

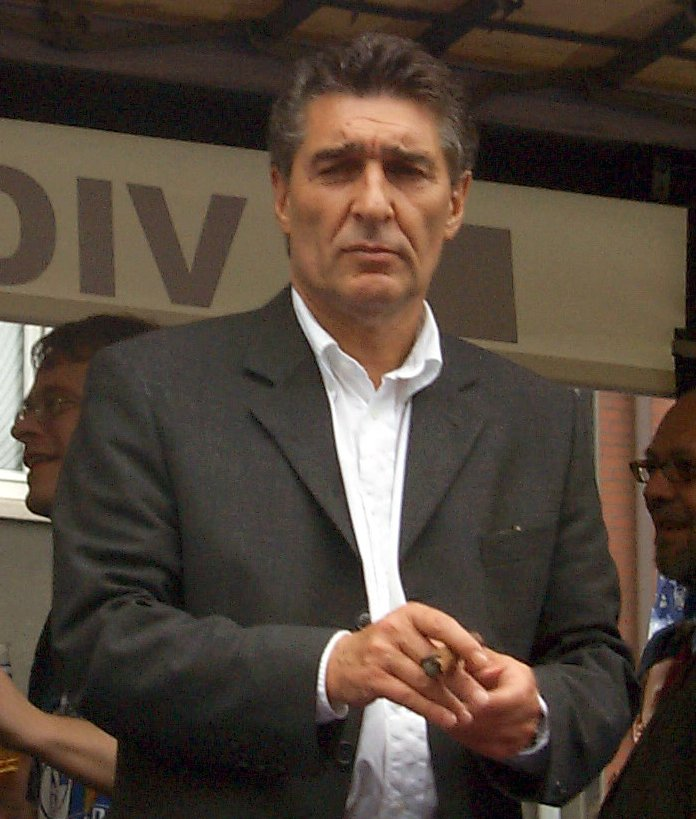
- Assauer in 2002

Personal information
- Full name: Rudolf Assauer
- Date of birth: 30 April 1944
- Place of birth: Sulzbach-Altenwald, Germany
- Date of death: 6 February 2019 (aged 74)
- Place of death: Herten, Germany
- Height: 1.80 m (5 ft 11 in)
- Position: Defender

Youth career
- 1952–1963: SpVgg Herten

Senior career*
Years	Team	Apps	(Gls)
1963–1964	SpVgg Herten	35	(7)
1964–1970	Borussia Dortmund	121	(8)
1970–1976	Werder Bremen	186	(4)
Total		342	(19)

Managerial career
- 1976–1981: Werder Bremen (general manager)
- 1977: → Werder Bremen (joint interim)
- 1980: → Werder Bremen (joint interim)
- 1981–1986: Schalke 04 (general manager)
- 1981: → Schalke 04 (joint interim)
- 1983: → Schalke 04 (interim)
- 1990–1993: VfB Oldenburg (general manager)
- 1993–2006: Schalke 04 (general manager)
- * Club domestic league appearances and goals

Rudolf "Rudi" Assauer (30 April 1944 – 6 February 2019) was a German football player and executive. After his professional career for Borussia Dortmund and Werder Bremen, Assauer served as the general manager of FC Schalke 04 for many years.

== Career ==
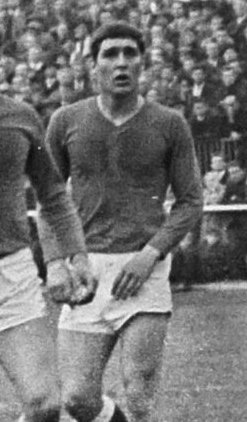
Assauer in 1965

Born in Saarland, Assauer played in 307 matches for Borussia Dortmund and Werder Bremen between 1964 and 1976. From 1976 to 1981, he remained the general manager of Werder Bremen, before leaving to work as a general manager for Schalke 04 for the first time between 1981 and 1986 (he was the interim head coach in 1981 on two occasions; firstly with Heinz Redepenning, and secondly, on his own). This first tenure ended with his dismissal, and Assauer spent four years out of football and went into real estate. He re-entered management in 1990, and in 1993, he once again became the general manager (not a coaching position) at Schalke.

Since taking over for the second time, Schalke have seen much success, including a 1997 UEFA Cup win, and victory in the DFB-Pokal finals of 2001 and 2002. Schalke narrowly lost the Bundesliga title race in 2001 in the very last minute to Bayern Munich, which was described as the most bitter moment in his career. Assauer also oversaw the development of a brand new stadium for the club. In May 2006, Assauer was suspected of giving away secret information concerning the financial problems of Schalke, so the club and Assauer parted company.

As of February 2009, he had been a player agent. His agency Assauer Sportmanagement AG represents, among others, Marc-André Kruska, Stefan Wächter, Sun Xiang and Pekka Lagerblom.

== Image and personality ==
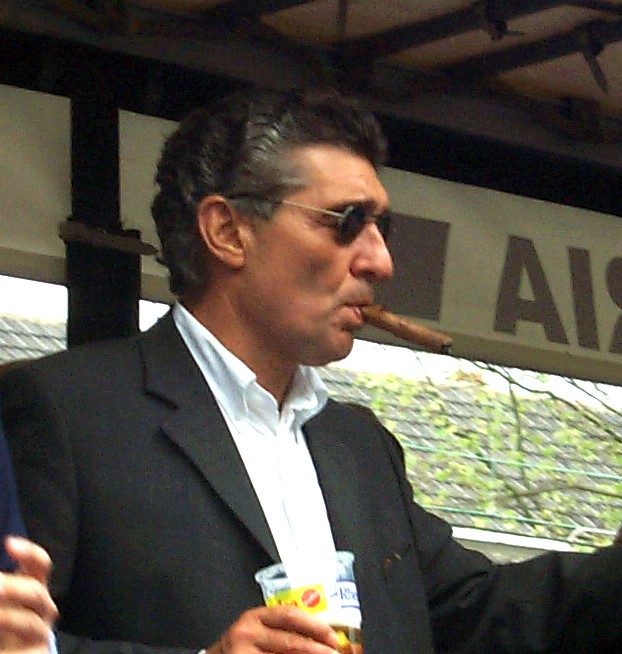
Assauer in 2002, during Schalke's DFB-Pokal victory celebrations

Assauer was one of the best-known German football executives, also because of his distinctive image and appearance. He was very outspoken with his opinions and had the image of a "macho with heart". Due to his habit of smoking a great number of cigars, he was given the nickname Stumpen-Rudi or Cheroot Rudi. He was described by Michael Meier, former chairman of Borussia Dortmund, as a Kashmir Hooligan.

In 2010, he was quoted as saying openly gay footballers should find another job. "If a player came to me and said he was gay I would say to him: 'You have shown courage'. But then I would tell him to find something else to do. That's because those who out themselves always end up busted by it, ridiculed by their fellow players and by people in the stands. We should spare them these witch hunts."

== Personal life ==
Assauer lived with the actress Simone Thomalla until January 2009.

On 31 January 2012, Assauer confirmed media reports that he, still only 67, was suffering from Alzheimer's disease. Assauer spoke openly about his disease in a number of interviews afterwards, which started a public discussion about Alzheimer's, but withdrew from the public during his last years. On 6 February 2019, his life partner Beata Schneider announced that he had died.

== Managerial statistics ==
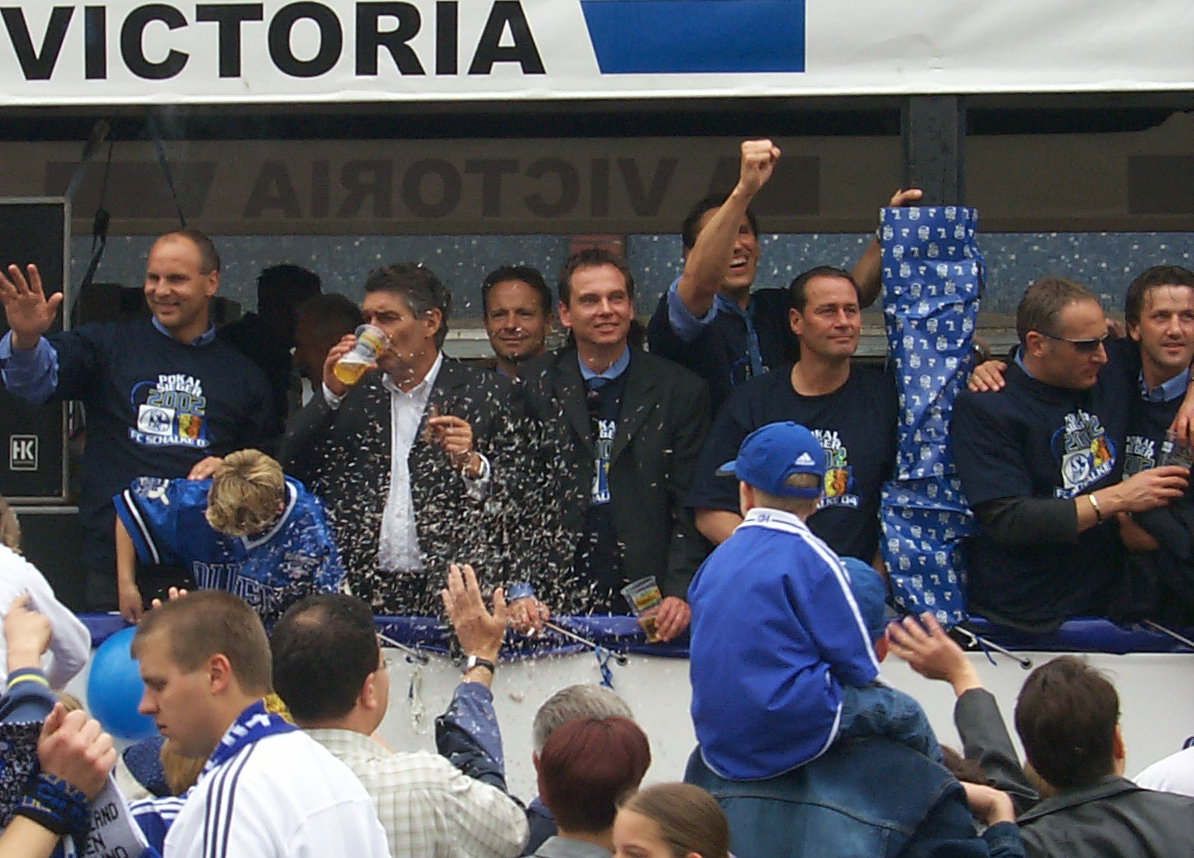
Assauer (second, left) in 2002, during Schalke's Pokal victory celebrations

Team	From	To	Record					
Team	From	To	G	W	D	L	Win %	Ref.
Werder Bremen	20 December 1977	31 December 1977	1	1	0	0	100.00	
Werder Bremen	29 January 1980	20 February 1980	1	0	0	1	0.00	
Schalke 04	26 May 1981	30 June 1981	2	0	1	1	0.00	
Schalke 04	20 January 1983	24 January 1983	1	0	1	0	0.00	
Total			5	1	2	2	20.00	—

== Honours ==
=== Player ===
Borussia Dortmund

- DFB-Pokal: 1964–65
- European Cup Winners' Cup: 1965–66
