= 7 Dwarves – Men Alone in the Wood =

2004 film by Sven Unterwaldt

7 Dwarves – Men Alone With Their Wood
- German theatrical release poster
- Directed by: Sven Unterwaldt Jr.
- Written by: Bernd Eilert, Sven Unterwaldt Jr., Otto Waalkes (novel)
- Based on: Snow White by Brothers Grimm
- Produced by: Bernd Eilert, Andreas Grosch, Andreas Schmid, Otto Waalkes, Douglas Welbat
- Starring: Otto Waalkes; Heinz Hoenig; Mirco Nontschew; Boris Aljinovic
- Cinematography: Jo Heim
- Edited by: Julia von Frihling
- Music by: Joja Wendt
- Distributed by: Universal Pictures (though United International Pictures)
- Release date: 28 October 2004
- Running time: 91 minutes (PAL-DVD version)
- Country: Germany
- Language: German

7 Dwarves – Men Alone In the Woods (German: 7 Zwerge – Männer allein im Wald) is a German comedy film, created in 2004 by Otto Waalkes, loosely based on the story of Snow White and the Seven Dwarves, while also containing parodies of many other fairy tales by the Brothers Grimm.

The film, created by the NRW Film Fund (Filmstiftung NRW), was the second most popular film in German cinemas in 2004, reaching an audience of almost 7 million, making it one of the most successful German films ever.

Its success spawned a sequel in 2006, 7 Dwarves: The Forest Is Not Enough and a computer-animated adaptation in 2014, The Seventh Dwarf.

== Plot ==
Little Red Riding Hood is picking flowers when she decides to enter Unterwaldt, a dark forest. The dwarf Bubi spies on her, but is attacked by a bear, who turns out to be the disguised dwarf Tschakko. As looking at a woman is forbidden by the dwarves, he is punished by having squirrels tickle his feet.

The dwarves have a meeting which is interrupted by "giant" Ralphie. He wants to become a member of "the seven dwarves", but this is impossible as "there are already seven dwarves". The dwarves sent Ralphie away and decide to blow up the bridge so women won't be able to enter the forest in the future. As they have had a bad experience with dynamite, they only place a sign which forbids women to pass.

Meanwhile, the ghost in the queen's magic mirror tells the queen that while she is beautiful, someone named Snow White is even more so. The queen calls the hunter, who had previously been ordered to get rid of Snow White. It turns out that the hunter took her to the orphanage.

At the orphanage, a naive Snow White still plays with her dolls. The ghost of the mirror appears in the mirror of her dollhouse and informs Snow White that a round-up has been organized to find her. Snow White runs away, and is tracked by the hunter and his dog Brutus, but after losing Snow White's track, they return to the castle. The hunter tells the queen that his dog Brutus mauled Snow White into a thousand pieces and ate her.

When the dwarves return at their cottage, they find a sleeping Snow White. They want to get rid of her, but their opinion changes after Snow White suggests that they split up the house into two parts. Snow White considered dwarves to be much smaller. They declare that the length of a dwarf is an old prejudice. It is not the length, but the lifestyle which determines whether someone is a dwarf or not. Upon this, Ralphie once again asks if he can be a dwarf, but this is again rejected as "there are already seven dwarves".

Snow White discovers why the various dwarves have an aversion to women: Sunny and Cloudy were expelled from a school play by their female teacher. Speedy fell in love with Rapunzel, but while he was climbing her left braid, Rapunzel cut it off and Speedy fell. Tschakko's aversion is caused as he can't and won't beat up women. Cookie once made vegetarian food which was not appreciated by his mother. Brumboss starts his story, but does not get further than the first sentence.

The queen consults her magic mirror and finds out that Snow White is still alive; she locks up the hunter in the dungeon. She dresses up and goes to Snow White.

While the dwarves are planning a surprise party for Snow White's 18th birthday, the queen kidnaps her. The dwarves look for her, but only find the queen's crown. They take their horse and head to the castle. Once there, they notice that Brummboss is missing. Snow White is in the dungeon and gets a visit from Brummboss, disguised as a priest. He finally tells her why he hates women. According to the midwife, his wife and child died during delivery. Brummboss, who was king, abdicated and threw away his crown. The midwife took the crown and became the new queen, as the law states that the ruler is the person who wears the crown.

Brummboss, still disguised, takes Snow White to the scaffold. Just before her execution, Brummboss reveals that he is the king who disappeared 18 years ago, and also reveals that he is Snow White's father. He puts the crown on his head and becomes king again.

The remaining dwarves return to their cottage. As they are now six, Ralphie is selected as the seventh dwarf. The dwarves decide not to help women ever again, but this promise does not stand long: Little Red Riding Hood knocks at the door and searches for help as she is lost in the wood.

== Cast ==
In alphabetical order:

- Boris Aljinovic as Cloudy
- Tom Gerhardt as Wache
- Cosma Shiva Hagen as Snow White
- Nina Hagen as The Queen
- Norbert Heisterkamp as Ralfie
- Heinz Hoenig as Brummboss
- Mavie Hörbiger as Little Red Riding Hood
- Rüdiger Hoffmann as The Mirror on the Wall
- Markus Majowski as Cookie
- Mirco Nontschew as Tschakko
- Hans Werner Olm as Spliss
- Harald Schmidt as The Best Jester Candidate
- Ralf Schmitz as Sunny
- Helge Schneider as The White Helge
- Martin Schneider as Speedy
- Atze Schröder as the Jester
- Hilmi Sözer as the Guard
- Christian Tramitz as the Hunter
- Otto Waalkes as Bubi

== Parodies ==
- Gute Zeiten, schlechte Zeiten opening theme.

== Accolades ==
- 2004: Platinum Box Office Germany Award
- 2005: The German Comedy Award (Deutscher Comedypreis) for best comedic film
- 2005: Goldene Leinwand mit Stern

== Sequel ==
On 26 October 2006, a sequel to the original film was released: 7 Zwerge – Der Wald ist nicht genug ("Seven Dwarves - The Forest Is Not Enough"). The main cast stayed the same, apart from Markus Majowski, who was unable to film due to theatre contract commitments. He was replaced by Gustav Peter Wöhler in the film.

On 25 September 2014, the animated film The 7th Dwarf was released to cinemas. The actors from the films reprised their roles.
