= Ralf Schmitz =

German comedian and actor

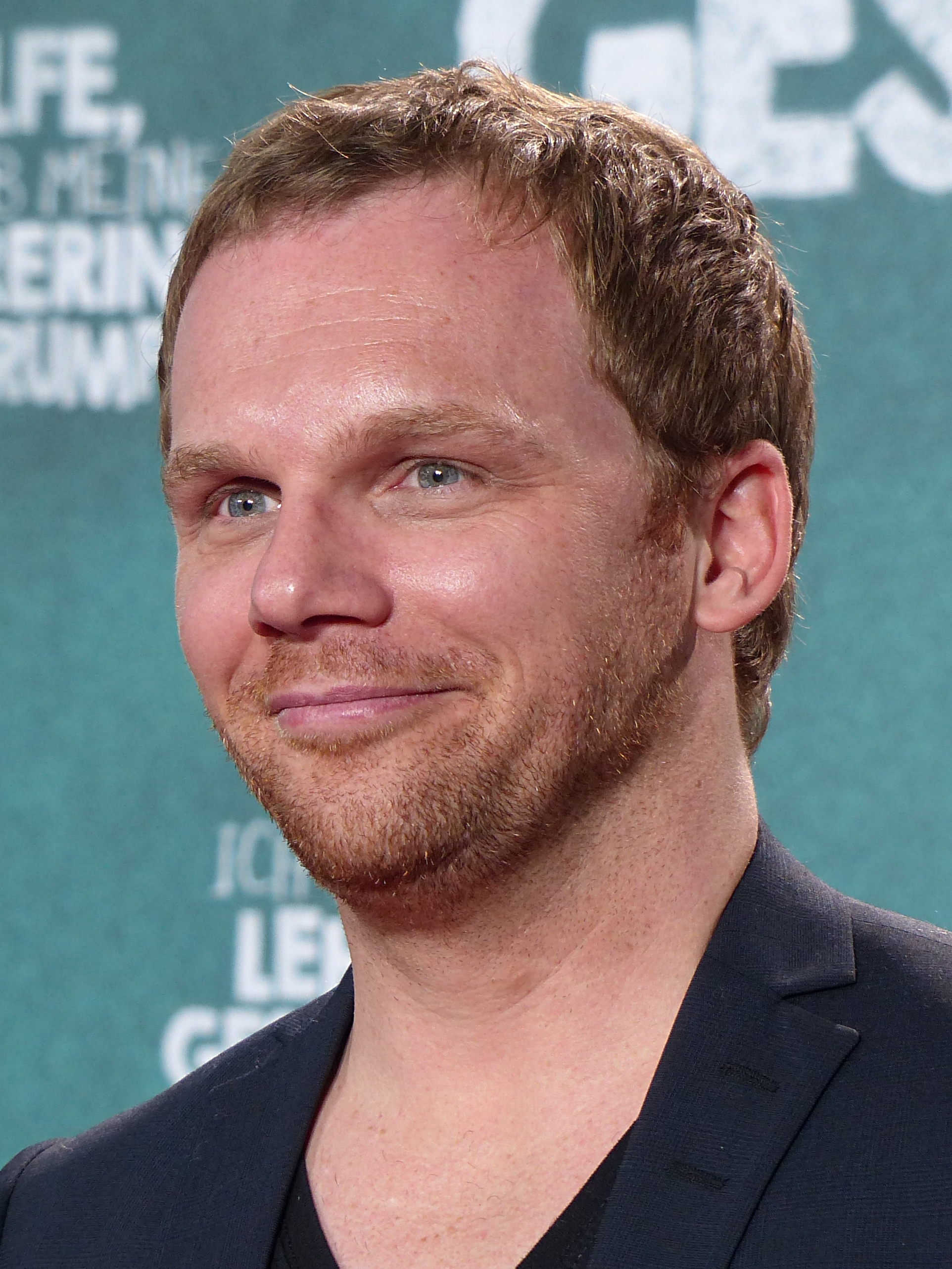
- Schmitz in 2015
- Born: 3 November 1974 (age 52); Leverkusen, North Rhine-Westphalia, West Germany
- Occupations: Comedian; Actor
- Website: Personal website

Ralf Schmitz (born 3 November 1974 in Leverkusen) is a German comedian and actor.

== Life ==
Schmitz works as an actor in German television.

== Filmography ==
- since 2003: Genial daneben – Die Comedy Arena
- 2004–2006: Schillerstraße
- 2002–2005: Die Dreisten Drei (bis Ende der 3. Staffel)
- 2005: Sag die Wahrheit
- 2005: Sarah Kuttner – Die Show
- 2006: Schmitz komm raus (2006)
- 2006–2008: Frag doch mal die Maus
- 2006: Zimmer frei!
- 2007: Eine große Nachtmusik
- 2007: Löwenzahn
- 2007: Die Sendung mit der Maus
- 2007/2008: Ein Herz für Kinder
- 2008: Kicken für Kinder
- 2008: Inas Nacht
- 2008: Happy Otto!
- 2008: Lachen mit Otto Waalkes – Der Ostfriesische Götterbote wird 60
- 2008: Jukebox Helden
- 2009: Schmitz in the City
- 2010: Bei Kerner
- 2010: Ralf Schmitz live! Schmitzophren
- 2011: Ralf Schmitz Live (RTL)
- since 2013: Take Me Out
- 2014: Hotel Zuhause

== Films ==
- 2004: 7 Zwerge – Männer allein im Wald (as Sunny)
- 2005: The Little Polar Bear 2: The Mysterious Island (dubbing, Pepe)
- 2005: Urmel aus dem Eis (as Ping Pinguin)
- 2006: Ab durch die Hecke (dubbing, Hammy)
- 2006: The Trip to Panama (Schnuddel)
- 2006: 7 Zwerge – Der Wald ist nicht genug (as Sunny)
- 2007: Shaun das Schaf (music video)
- 2008: Kung Fu Panda (dubbing, Master Crane)
- 2010: Konferenz der Tiere (dubbing, Billy)
- 2011: Kung Fu Panda 2 (dubbing, Master Crane)
- 2014: The 7th Dwarf (as Sunny)

== Books ==
- Schmitz' Katze – Hunde haben Herrchen, Katzen haben Personal. S. Fischer Verlag, September 2008. ISBN 3-596-17978-5
- Schmitz' Mama: Andere haben Probleme, ich hab' Familie. S. Fischer Verlag, September 2011. ISBN 3-596-19110-6
- Schmitz’ Häuschen: Wer Handwerker hat, braucht keine Feinde mehr. Bastei Lübbe, September 2014, ISBN 3-404-60806-2

== Awards ==
- 2003: Deutscher Comedypreis as Bester Newcomer
- 2005: Eins Live Krone as Best Comedian
