= Markus Majowski =

German actor and comedian

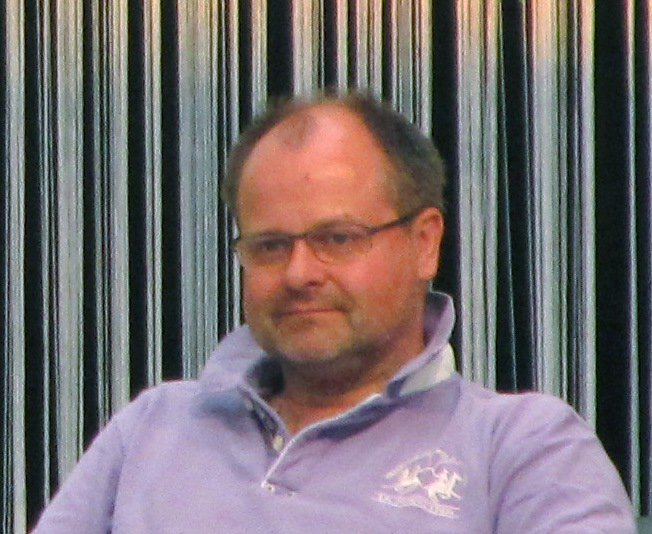
Markus Majowski2013,

Markus Majowski (29 April 1964 in West Berlin) is a German actor and comedian. Today he lives in Berlin.

== Career ==
=== Theatre and Television ===
His first television appearance was 1988 in the television series The Black Forest Clinic. Later, he had small roles in several series, Hellish Neighbors, 7 Dwarves – Men Alone in the Wood and Die Rote Meile. From 2002 to 2008, Majowski featured on the Sat.1 comedy series Die Dreisten Drei. On 13 July 2008, he starred in the German version of Come Dine with Me on VOX.

=== Advertising ===
Since 1997, Majowski has been working in advertising for German Telekom. In addition, he runs Majowski party advertising. For several years he has also been working in advertising for the poultry producer Wiesenhof.
