= Die Dreisten Drei =

- Also known as: Die Dreisten Drei – Die Comedy WG
- Genre: Comedy
- Developed by: Otto Steiner; Ulrich Brock
- Opening theme: Fatboy Slim – Brimful of Asha
- Country of origin: Germany

Production
- Running time: 22 minutes

Original release
- Network: Sat.1
- Release: January 10, 2003 – present

Die Dreisten Drei – Die Comedy WG is a German sketch comedy series, which aired from 2003 to 2008 on Sat.1 and returned in February 2012 with a new cast.

== Concept ==
The skits in Die Dreisten Drei center around every day situations or scenes, for example in a supermarket, in a park, on the bench or in a book shop. As a framework for the different skits the three are shown living together in their shared flat, usually watching TV.

== Cast ==
2002	2003	2004	2005	2006	2007	2008	2012
Markus Majowski							Oliver Beerhenke
Ralf Schmitz				Mathias Schlung		Manuel Cortez	Mirco Nontschew
Mirja Boes					Janine Kunze		Sophia Thomalla

== Awards ==
- 2004, 2005, 2006: German Comedy Award as the best sketch comedy show
- 2004: German Television Award as the best entertainment show
- 2004: Rose d’Or as the best sketch show

== See also ==
- List of German television series
