= Janine Kunze =

German actress and presenter (born 1974)

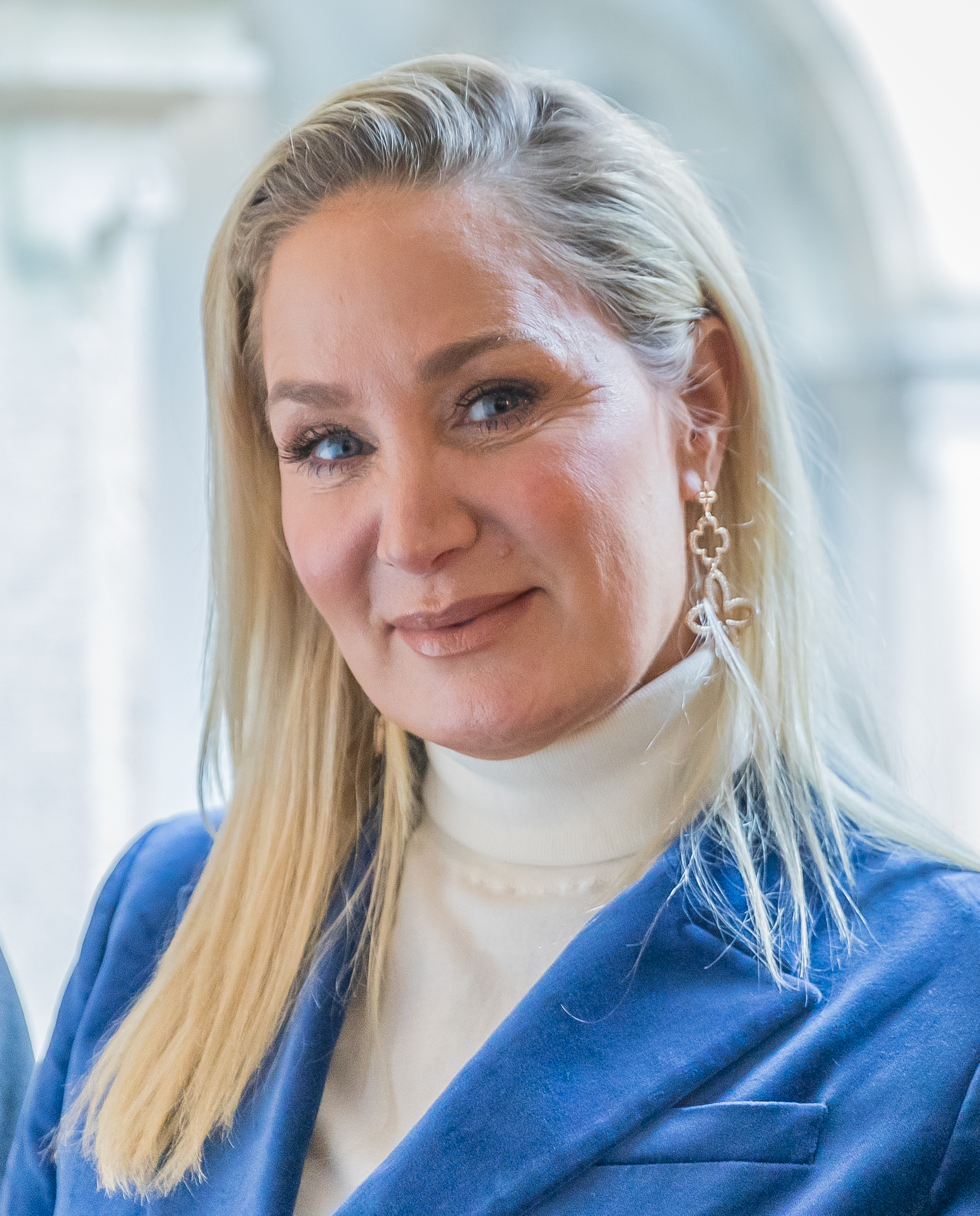
Kunze in 2025

Janine Kunze (born 20 March 1974 in Cologne) is a German actress and television presenter. She is best known for her roles in the comedy series Hausmeister Krause from 1999 to 2010, and the sketch comedy show Die Dreisten Drei from 2007 to 2008.

Kunze also appeared in Die Rote Meile, Balko, Barfuss, The Comedy Trap, Clueless Genius: The Comedy Arena, and Extreme Activity, among others. In 2011, she presented the second season of Die Alm, along with Daniel Aminati.

== Personal life ==
Kunze is married to Dirk Budach, with whom she has two daughters and one son.
