= Daniel Welbat =

Daniel Welbat (alias WellBad)
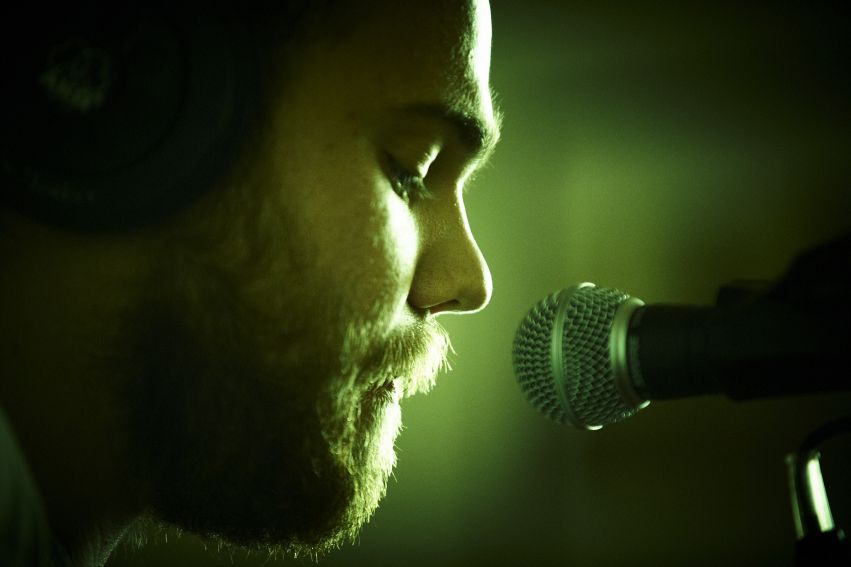
- Daniel Welbat in the Hafenklang Tonstudio Hamburg (2010)

Background information
- Born: Daniel Welbat; 7 May 1989 (age 36); Hamburg, West Germany
- Genres: Rock, blues
- Occupation(s): Singer-songwriter, musician, actor, composer
- Instrument(s): Vocals, guitar, keyboards
- Years active: 2010–present
- Labels: BlueCentral OHG, MovieCompany Musikverlag
- Website: wellbad.de

Daniel Welbat (born 7 May 1989 in Hamburg, West Germany), alias WellBad (coinage: Well+Bad), is a German blues rock musician and soundtrack composer.

== Life ==
Welbat is the son of the German producer Douglas Welbat and the actress Katja Brügger. He recorded his first songs when he was 16 years old. He was 20 years old when he founded the label Blue Central Records with his cousin. His models were Willie Dixon, The Black Keys, Eels and Tom Waits.

WellBad composed the soundtrack to the 2010 German film Vater Morgana. The recordings were made in the Hafenklang-Studios in Hamburg.

== Discography ==
EP

- 2010: Better Days (CD, Blue Central Records OHG)

Albums

- 2011: beautiful disaster (CD, Blue Central Records OHG)

Soundtracks

- 2010: Vater Morgana [Soundtrack] (Blue Central Records OHG)

== Filmography ==
- 2004: Kleider machen Leute (short film); director and screenplay
- 2009: Wittich (pilot broadcast); director, soundtrack
- 2010: Vater Morgana; soundtrack
- 2010: Die Drei Fragezeichen
