= Otto Waalkes =

German comedian (born 1948)

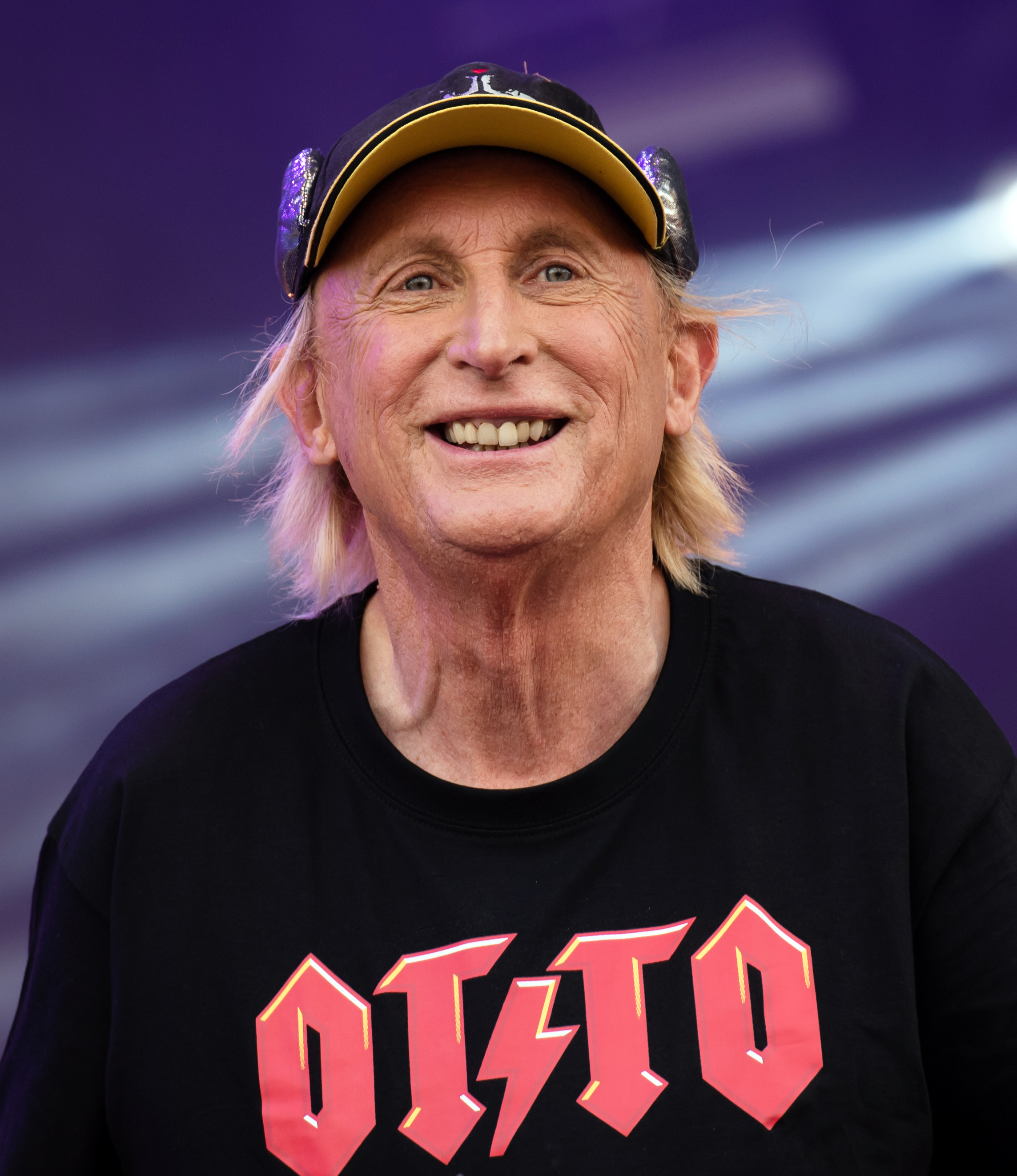
- Waalkes in 2018
- Born: Otto Gerhard Waalkes; 22 July 1948 (age 78); Emden, Germany
- Other name: Otto
- Occupations: Comedian; musician; actor; comics artist; writer; director
- Website: otto-waalkes.com

Otto Gerhard Waalkes (born 22 July 1948), or mononymously Otto, is a German comedian, actor, musician, writer, and comic book artist. He became famous in the 1970s and 1980s in Germany with his shows, books and films. His best known trademark are the 'Ottifanten' ('Ottiphants'), elephant-like comic characters of his own design. They featured on the cover of his first album release.

Waalkes also works as a voice actor, providing the German voices of Mushu in Disney's Mulan, Sid the Sloth in the Ice Age franchise, and the Grinch in The Grinch, among others.

== Life ==
Waalkes was born as the second son of Karl Waalkes, a painter and decorator, and his wife Adele (born Lüpkes). Together with his older brother Karl-Heinz, he grew up in the working-class district Transvaal in Emden (East Frisia). His parents were deeply religious Baptists and members of the Evangelic Free Church community of Emden, which taught a Bible-class that Waalkes visited regularly. He made his first public performance at the age of eleven years in a shopping mall in Emden, where he presented songs, including the Babysitter Boogie, a German version of the Baby Sittin' Boogie. He was awarded with a voucher of 30 Deutschmark and the book Mutiny on the Bounty. When Waalkes was twelve years old, he received his first guitar. In 1964, he performed for the first time in the area of Emden with his band The Rustlers, mainly covering songs by the Beatles. Waalkes was the front of the band, being the lead singer and the lead guitarist simultaneously. He toured with his band in the regions of East Frisia for five years.

In 1968, Waalkes passed his final exams (Abitur) at a boys' grammar school in Emden. After having failed to obtain a university place in Freie Malerei ("free art studies"), he started to study art education at the University of Fine Arts of Hamburg in 1970, although he never pursued a teaching profession. Among others, he was taught by Hans Thiemann, a German painter.

Waalkes' first stage performance took place in Danny's Pan, a folklore club in Hamburg where people could perform for ten minutes after having paid five Deutschmark. He lived in a commune named Villa Kunterbunt (German for Villa Villekulla) together with 14 roommates in Hamburg. Two of his roommates were Udo Lindenberg and Marius Müller-Westernhagen.

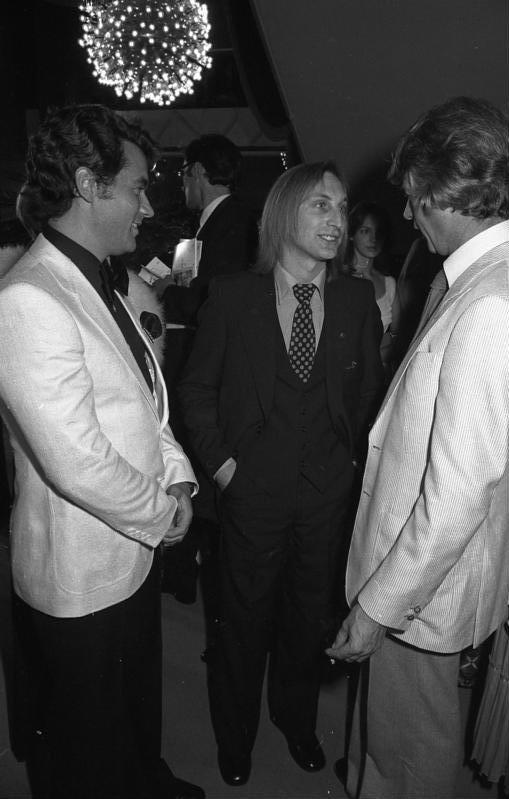
Waalkes (center) with Hans-Jürgen Bäumler (left) and Rudi Carrell in 1977

Waalkes kept performing smaller gigs with his guitar in clubs of Hamburg to finance his studies. He cracked some jokes alongside to his songs and apologized whenever he accidentally dropped the microphone due to his nervousness. Over time, his apologies became more popular than his music, so his comedic stage show started to evolve. The clubs where he performed became gradually bigger – suddenly they were not merely named Onkel Pö but Westfalenhalle.

In 1972, Waalkes met his later manager Hans Otto Mertens. In the same year, he performed his first big concert with his band The Rustlers in Hamburg, which he recorded live at his own charge. He also founded the label Rüssl Räckords with Mertens, because no other record label wanted to publish the live records of Waalkes' performance. His album LP Otto was published in the same year and was sold over 500,000 times.

Waalkes is a survivor of the MGM Grand Fire on 21 November 1980. He was residing on the 26th floor during the accident and was evacuated by firefighters during the rescue efforts.

Waalkes was married to Manuela "Manu" (born Ebelt) from 1987 to 1999. In 1987, his son Benjamin Karl Otto Gregory was born.

In 2000, Waalkes married Eva Hassmann in Jork, an actress born in 1972. According to their own statement, they had an open marriage and often lived in different places.

The couple officially split in early November 2011 and got divorced on 22 November 2012.

Waalkes lives in Hamburg-Blankenese and is officially registered as a constituent of Hamburg.

In 2023, German rapper Ski Aggu and Dutch musician Joost Klein created an edit of Waalkes' song 'Friesenjung' from 1993. The edit reached the first position of the German Singles Chart.

== Career ==
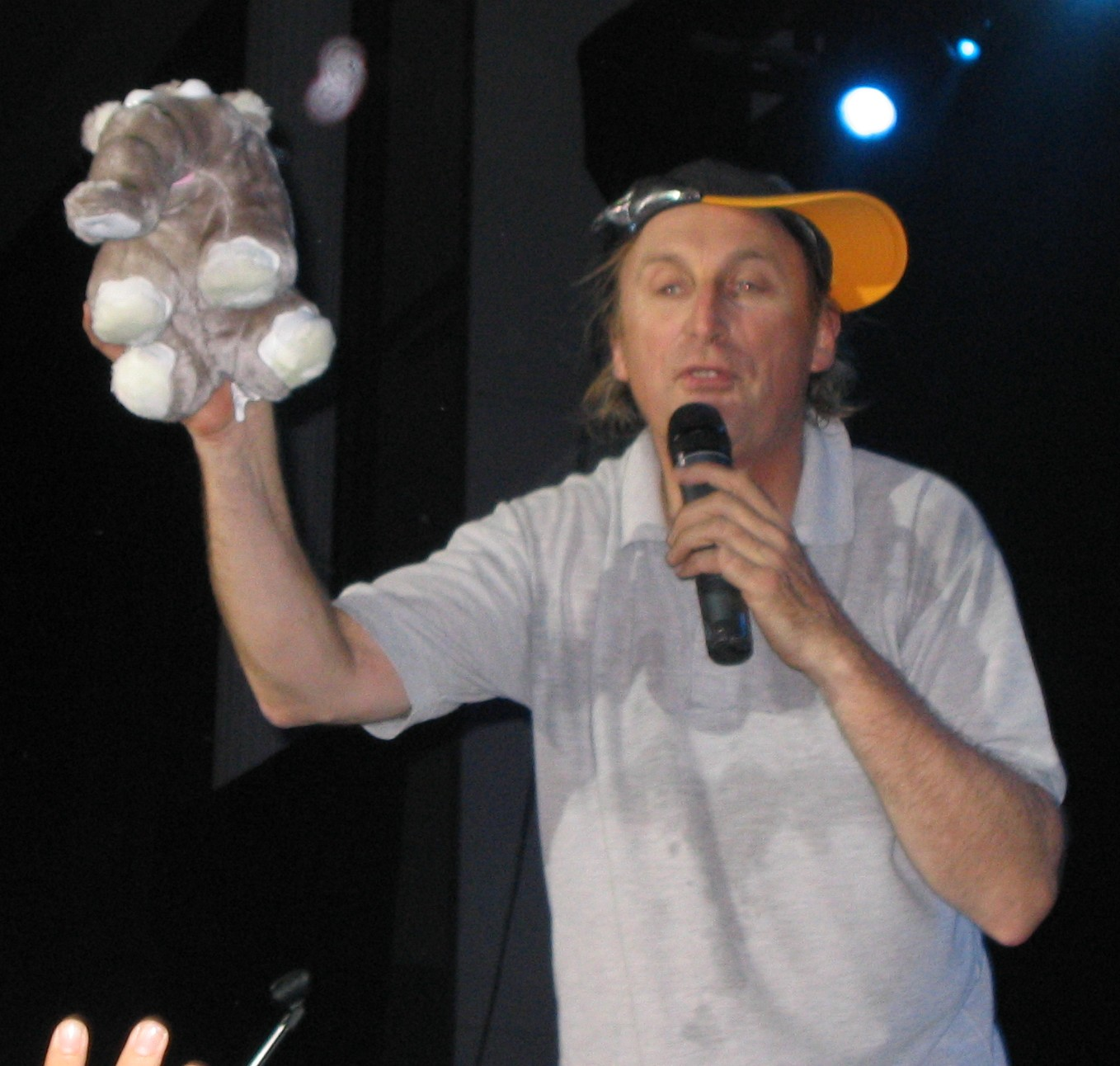
Waalkes in 2005

Waalkes' humor consists of puns and word plays as well as the use of silly and funny language, noises and body language. Parodies, for instance in form of popular songs that he revises and presents with his guitar, are typical stylistic elements. Additionally, he often imbeds satire, political innuendos and critique of time and society into his humorous performances.

His Otto-Bücher (Otto-books) are regularly published and his Otto-Langspielplatten (Otto-long-playing records) became bestsellers, whereby many records attained top spots in musical charts and shops.

Waalkes is counted among the entertainers that have influenced the general use of language. A considerable part of this refers back to his early performances, where he mainly used texts of the New Frankfurt School. For example, the sentence "Hast du mal 'ne Zigarette? Meine Schachtel steckt noch im Automaten!" ("Do you have a cigarette? My pack is still in the machine!") was firstly introduced by Waalkes. The set phrase "Einen hab' ich noch!" ("I've got another one for you!") introducing the next joke is often ascribed to him, however, it was firstly introduced by Heinz Erhardt, as many of Waalkes' set phrases are.

Waalkes played roles that became famous on their own, for example the reporter Harry Hirsch, Frau Suhrbier and the senior forestry official Oberförster Pudlich, as well as Herbert von Karamalz, who portrays a parody of Herbert von Karajan and a nod to a German brand of Malt beer.

Waalkes' most famous comic character is the Ottifant ('Ottiphant'), which he drew originally only for the cover of a record. Over time, the stick-figure developed into a distinct cartoon character with its own family. Their adventures and stories were published in several newspapers and books. Furthermore, a cartoon series, consisting of 13 episodes, depicted the Ottifanten on RTL and Super RTL in 1993. An animated cinema movie named Kommando Störtebeker portrayed the Ottifanten.

Besides his stage performances, Waalkes has appeared several times on camera as an actor or off camera as a director. His movies are parodies of current events within the scope of culture and public life and are characterized by situation comedy and caricatured individuals.

In 2018, Waalkes was awarded with the Officer's Cross of the Order of Merit of the Federal Republic of Germany for his lifework.

In June 2021, a German film version of Catweazle was released with Waalkes in the title role.

== Discography ==
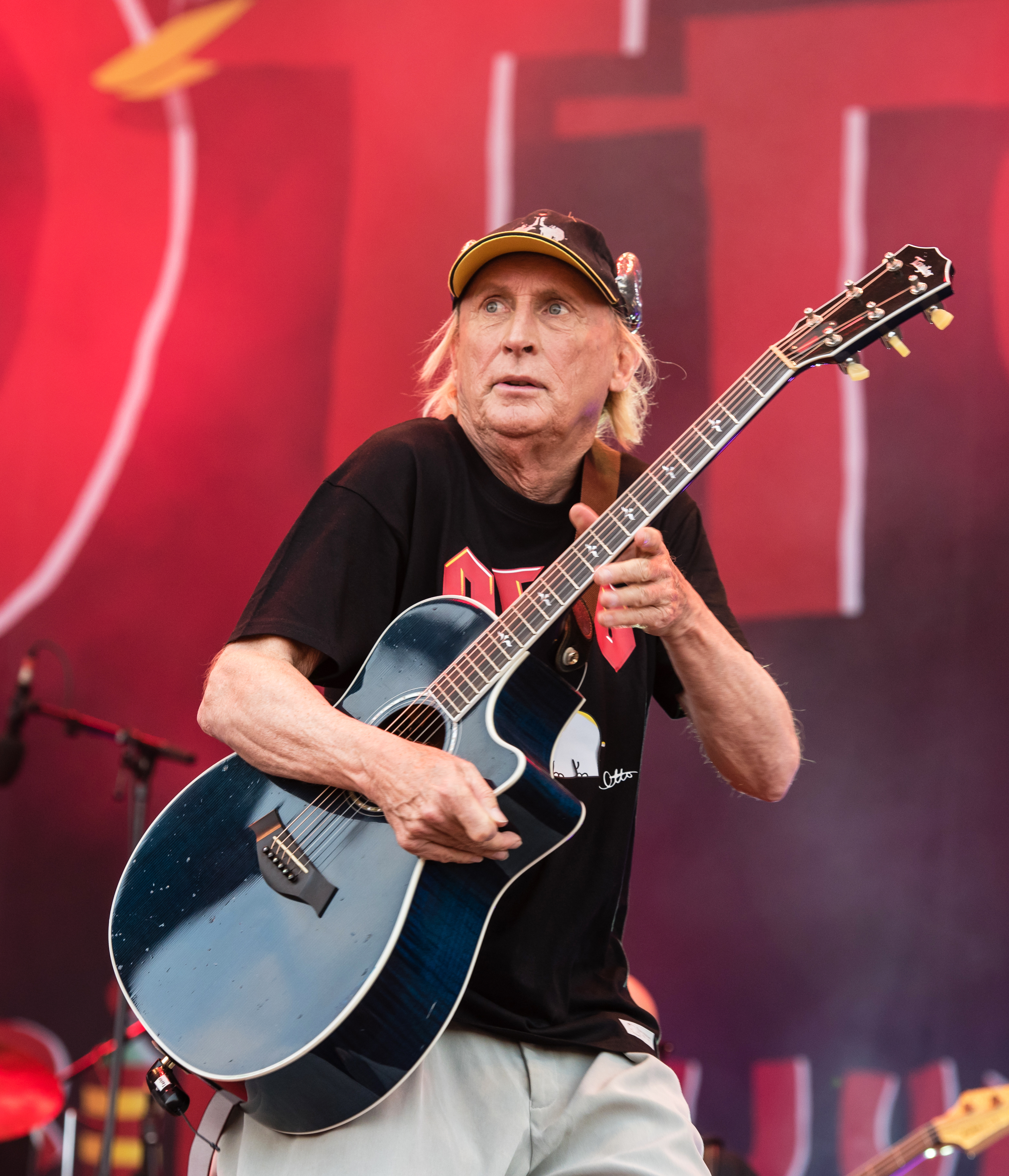
Waalkes performing in 2018

| Year | Title | Chart Positions | | | |
| Year | Title | DE | AT | CH | EU |
|---|---|---|---|---|---|
| 1973 | Otto | 1 | – | – | – |
| 1974 | Die Zweite | 1 | – | – | – |
| 1975 | Oh, Otto | 2 | 3 | – | – |
| 1976 | (Das vierte Programm) | 1 | 2 | – | – |
| 1977 | Das Wort zum Montag | 4 | 5 | – | – |
| 1978 | Ottocolor | 7 | 4 | – | – |
| 1980 | Der Ostfriesische Götterbote | 2 | 11 | – | – |
| 1981 | Otto versaut Hamburg | 7 | 4 | – | – |
| 1983 | Hilfe Otto kommt! | 4 | 1 | 8 | – |
| 1995 | Die CD – Das Allerbeste | 55 | – | – | – |
| 1996 | Das Live Album | 11 | 14 | 12 | – |
| 1998 | Einen hab ich noch | 28 | 49 | 41 | – |
| 2001 | Ostfriesland und mehr | 40 | – | – | – |
| 2002 | Only Otto | 28 | – | – | – |
| 2003 | Otto – Die DVD | 40 | – | – | – |
| 2004 | Otto – Die ersten 15 Jahre | 71 | – | – | – |
| 2006 | 100 Jahre Otto | – | – | 77 | – |
| 2006 | "Zwergensong" | 12 | – | – | 33* |

== Filmography ==
- Otto – Der Film (Otto: The Movie) (1985)
- Otto – Der neue Film (Otto: The New Movie) (1987)
- Otto – Der Außerfriesische (Otto: The Alien from East Frisia) (1989)
- Otto – Der Liebesfilm (Otto: The Romance Film) (1992)
- Mulan (1998), as Mushu (German dub only)
- St. Pauli Night by Sönke Wortmann (1999) (Cameo)
- Otto – Der Katastrofenfilm (Otto: The Disaster Movie) (2000)
- Ice Age (2002), as Sid (German dub only)
- 7 Zwerge – Männer allein im Wald (7 Dwarves – Men Alone in the Wood) (2004)
- Ice Age: The Meltdown (2006), as Sid (German dub only)
- 7 Zwerge – Der Wald ist nicht genug (7 Dwarves: The Forest Is Not Enough) (2006)
- Ice Age: Dawn of the Dinosaurs (2009), as Sid (German dub only)
- Otto's Eleven (2010)
- Ice Age: Continental Drift (2012), as Sid (German dub only)
- The 7th Dwarf (Der 7bte Zwerg) (2014)
- Kartoffelsalat – Nicht fragen! (2015)
- Help, I Shrunk My Teacher (2015)
- Ice Age: Collision Course (2016), as Sid (German dub only)
- The Grinch (2018), as The Grinch (German dub only)
- Catweazle (2021)
- The Ice Age Adventures of Buck Wild (2022), as Sid (German dub only)

== See also ==
- German television comedy
