= Hans Werner Olm =

German television and film comedian (born 1955)

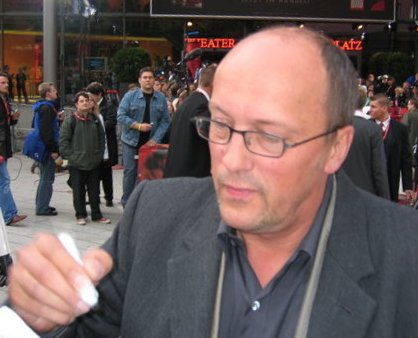
Hans Werner Olm

Hans Werner Olm (Born Hans Olm, 1 February 1955) is a German television and film comedian.

Olm was born in Bochum. His career began in 1975, when Olm travelled to Berlin to begin his comedy career in the city's clubs, striking a partnership in 1976 with Jürgen von der Lippe among others, known as the Gebrüder Blattschuss. In the following years he furthered his career as a standup comedian on a variety of television programmes, alongside German celebrities such as Mike Krüger and Gabi Decker.

Olm began with minor film roles, such as Die Supernasen 1982 with Krüger and fellow comedian Thomas Gottschalk and 1983's Sunshine Reggae auf Ibiza. His roles developed from small bit-parts to larger, more noticeable performances, such as in the comedy Schrott - Die Atzenposse.

In April 2002, he began his own television programme OLM! on the channel RTL. The characters which he brought to the small screen, including the failed ladykiller Paul Schrader and masculine yet clumsy Luise Koschinsky, led him to claim notoriety as a celebrity in German-speaking countries and to be recognised with the 2004 German Comedy Award. Despite his apparent success, and appearing in one of the most successful films of the year (7 Zwerge - Männer allein im Wald), the programme was dropped by RTL, in late 2004.

On 15 January 2006, Hans Werner Olm began a new programme on ProSieben Olm unterwegs (Olm on the Way). The familiar characters from his previous series returned, with the addition of Gunther Terbrüggen and Bademeister Bernd.

== Selected filmography ==
- Sunshine Reggae in Ibiza (1983)
- 7 Dwarves – Men Alone in the Wood (2004)

== Awards ==
- 2004 - German Comedy Award - Best Comedy Show for „OLM!“
- 2005 - German Comedy Award - for the role of "Spliss" in 7 Zwerge - Männer allein im Wald
