= Diagonale =

Annual film festival held in Graz, Austria

- Location: Graz, Austria
- Established: 1998

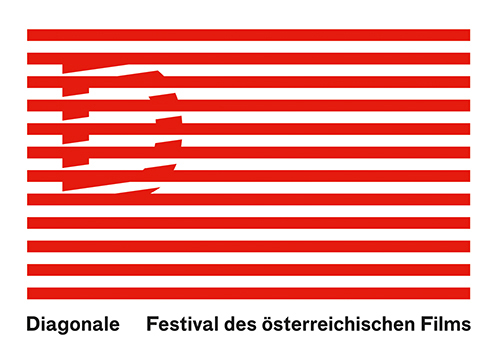
Diagonale Logo

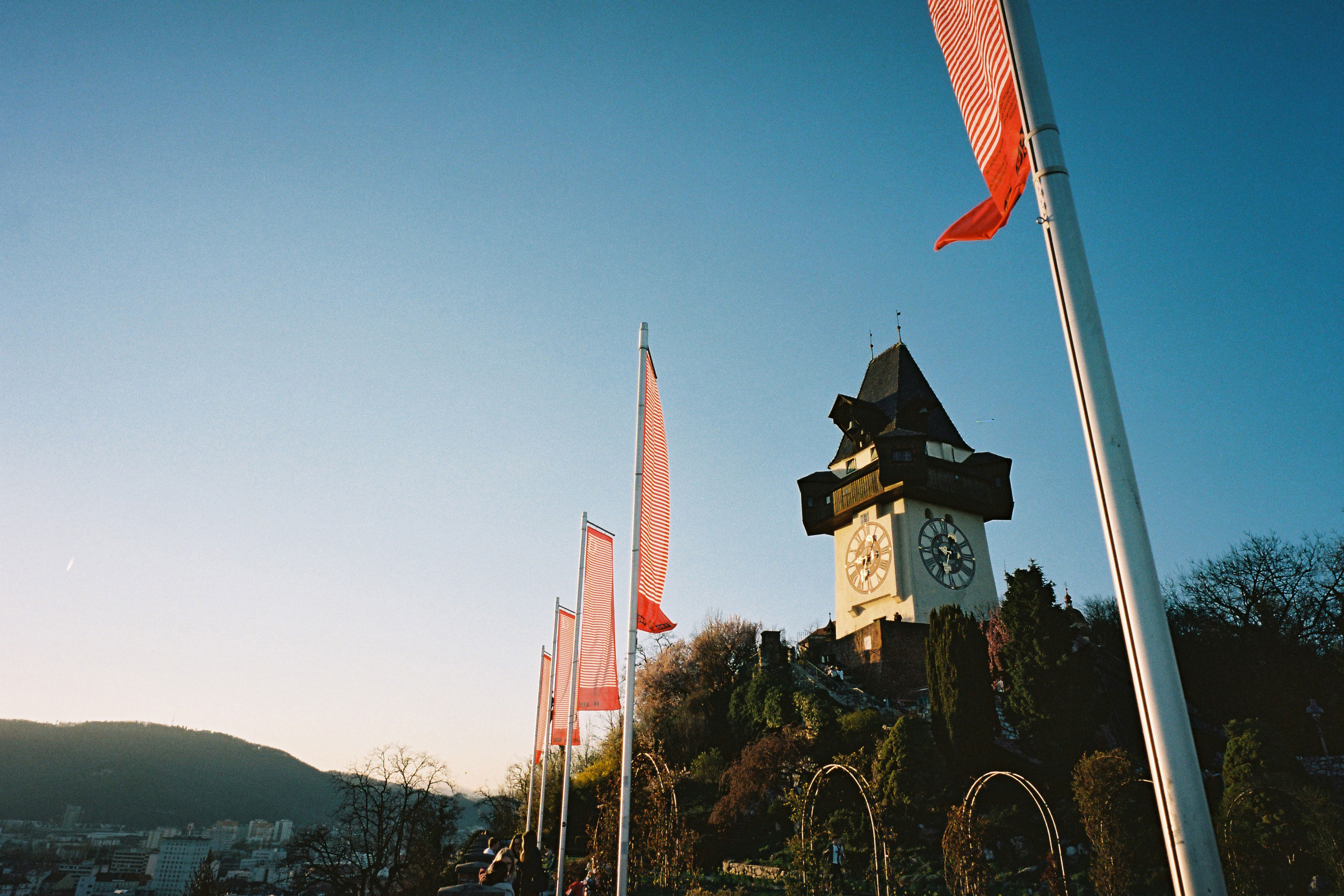
Diagonale'17 in Graz

The Diagonale (Festival of Austrian Film) is a film festival that takes place every March in Graz, Austria.

The festival was initially held under the auspices of the Austrian Film Commission in Salzburg from 1993 to 1995 but moved to Graz in 1998. Traditional cinema venues are Annenhof Kino, Schubertkino, KIZ RoyalKino, and the Filmzentrum im Rechbauerkino. At the end of the festival, expert juries award Austria's most highly endowed film prizes.

The Festival of Austrian Film has consolidated its position as a regionally based festival for film buffs that brings the industry and audience together, strengthens Austrian film, and attracts international attention.

== History ==
=== First Years ===
The first three Diagonale festivals were organized by the Austrian Film Commission in early December each year in cooperation with the Salzburg Festival in Salzburg. The festival was directed by filmmaker Peter Tscherkassky in 1993 and 1994, and Heinrich Mis (then director of the ORF program Kunst-Stücke) in 1995.

After a break, the festival moved to Graz. Its own supporting association "Forum österreichischer Film" was founded in 1998 under the leadership of Christine Dollhofer and Constantin Wulff, who presided over the association until 2003. In addition to film screenings, the program also includes discussions, audience talks, and exhibitions. In the first year in Graz, one hundred films were screened and prizes were awarded in three categories: a main prize, a prize for innovative cinema and a prize for newcomers. Later, a number of other prizes were added. In 1999, a prize for the best actor and actress was also awarded for the first time, although this was not the case again until 2008.

=== Since 2000 ===
The planning for the Diagonale 2004 initially began with a scandal, as Franz Morak, the State Secretary for the Arts responsible for the event, dismissed the previous program directors without explanation, despite their excellent performance, and replaced them with a new team without seeking consensus with the filmmakers concerned. Since this personnel selection met with opposition from nearly all filmmakers, it initially looked as if there might be two events with the same name: Morak's "official" Diagonale and an "unofficial" event set up by the media professionals themselves. Eventually, however, Morak relented and abandoned his event. After a restructuring of the sponsoring association and the willingness of numerous participants to volunteer, the Diagonale 2004 was able to take place in its usual form despite time pressure.

The background to Morak's intervention in the directorship is thought to be an attempt to make a more commercially oriented readjustment of the festival as well as a politically motivated "act of retaliation" against the film scene and the festival management, because the Diagonale positioned itself as a forum for anti-government protests and video works a few weeks after the controversial formation of the coalition between FPÖ and ÖVP in 2000. In the course of the controversy at the time over a petition printed in the festival catalog by numerous well-known filmmakers demanding the resignation of the government, the then Styrian regional councilor Hirschmann (ÖVP) even temporarily withheld the promised prize money from the state of Styria.

In the course of a restructuring by the supporting association "Forum österreichischer Film", the general assembly of the Diagonale appointed the three-person team Birgit Flos (artistic director), Robert Buchschwenter (production manager) and Georg Tillner (finance manager) as the new Diagonale management at the end of April 2004 on the suggestion of the Diagonale advisory board. After Buchschwenter and Tillner left, Oliver Testor took over the management of the festival in May 2005 until 2009.

The Diagonale 2006 took place from March 21 to 26 in Graz under the directorship of Birgit Flos. The festival center was set up in the Kunsthaus Graz for the first time in 2006. The UCI Annenhofkino, Schubertkino, KIZ RoyalKino, and the Filmzentrum im Rechbauerkino were the festival cinemas. In cooperation with the Kunsthaus Graz, the Diagonale also organized a highlight of the festival: In a tribute to the artist Maria Lassnig, her complete cinematic oeuvre was shown in newly restored copies.

In December 2006, Birgit Flos' contract was extended until the Diagonale 2008.

Also since 2006, there have been two equally endowed Grand Diagonale Prizes, for the best feature film and for the best documentary film.

==== Director Barbara Pichler (2009 to 2015) ====
From 2009 to 2015, the festival was directed by curator, publicist, and film mediator Barbara Pichler, who established the festival as a mediation and discussion platform for Austrian cinema with a more streamlined programming and increased focus on international industry networking. Her original three-year contract was initially extended by the Diagonale's sponsoring association until 2014 and later, at Pichler's own request, for only one more year until 2015. The directorship of the Diagonale from the 2016 festival onwards was put out to tender again at the beginning of April 2014. In November 2014, it was announced that the festival would be directed by the two Upper Austrians Sebastian Höglinger and Peter Schernhuber from 2016 onwards. Starting in 2009, the two had already co-directed the YOUKI International Youth Media Festival.

The Diagonale 2009 took place from March 17 to 22 and attracted 23,876 visitors. A "Personale" was dedicated to filmmaker Mara Mattuschka, while the international Tribute brought German filmmaker Stefan Krohmer to Graz. The special historical programs were devoted to the history of Austrian animated film, film restoration or focused on the almost forgotten work of the Viennese screenwriter Anna Gmeyner, who was driven into exile. In 2009, acting prizes were awarded for the third time since 1999. One was the Grand Diagonale Acting Prize to Josef Hader for his achievements in Austrian film, and the other was the Diagonale Special Jury Prize for the remarkable performance by an Austrian actress/actor in a 2008 Diagonale film to Birgit Minichmayr, who stars alongside Hader in Der Knochenmann.

With around 24,800 visitors, the Diagonale 2010 (March 16 to 21) was able to draw a positive conclusion after six festival days and 147 films and videos shown. One of the highlights of the festival was the internationally acclaimed Peter Schreiner "Personale", which presented and honored the documentary work of the Austrian filmmaker in a concentrated form. In addition, Romuald Karmakar, one of the most important voices of German cinema at the time, was a guest in Graz with his films. Special historical programs focused on the almost forgotten work of auteur filmmaker Mansur Madavi and on that of cinematographer Günther Krampf, who was forced into exile. The industry meeting was dedicated to the funding model "Film Location Austria". Two exhibitions also took place as part of the Diagonale 2010 program: "SILENT ALIEN GHOST MACHINE MUSEUM" by Norbert Pfaffenbichler at Kunstverein Medienturm and "brRRMMMWHee – extended version" by Billy Roisz at Kunsthaus Graz.

In 2011, the Diagonale took place from March 22 to 27 and was opened by Nikolaus Geyrhalter's documentary essay film Abendland. The "Personale" was dedicated to the renowned avant-garde filmmaker Peter Tscherkassky. Director and cinematographer Elfi Mikesch, a representative of European auteur cinema with Austrian roots, presented her two most recent works at the festival. The special historical program "Shooting Women. Female Pioneers of Austrian Film" with films by Valie Export, Margareta Heinrich, and others. Other specials were devoted to the Viennese animation film festival "Tricky Women" and filmmaker Linda Christanell. A wide-ranging discussion of female filmmaking took place at the Diagonale 2011 not only in the film and supporting program, but also at the level of film policy. Representatives of the film industry demanded more visibility for women in the film business as well as a quota for women in film committees and in the university sector. At the Kunstverein Medienturm, Nadim Vardag showed his exhibition "∆" at the end of the "Concept Film" series, while Sabine Marte, creator of the 2011 festival trailer, exhibited together with Clemens Hollerer under the title "Do we need to have an accident?" at Kunsthaus Graz. The trilateral industry meeting focused on the "Digital Revolution" in sales and marketing. Finally, 2011 saw the launch of "Diagonale GOES GREEN," a long-term strategy of social responsibility for the environment and sustainability.

The 15th Diagonale in Graz took place from March 20 to 25, 2012. Despite a slightly lower number of screenings and events compared to 2011, the occupancy rate rose to almost 74 percent. The Diagonale 2012 program reflected the high quality of current Austrian filmmaking in a focused selection. As always, the festival functioned as a place of encounter and exchange between the film industry and the public. In addition to many established names, numerous young filmmakers also presented their works. The Diagonale 2012 opened with a feature film debut: Spain by Anja Salomonowitz. As part of the opening, Johannes Silberschneider received the Grand Diagonale Acting Prize for his services to Austrian film culture. The highlights of the festival also included a "Personale" dedicated to the legendary avant-garde filmmaker Ferry Radax, which made his groundbreaking work accessible to a wider audience once again with a concentrated selection of films. The Israeli documentary filmmaker Avi Mograbi, was represented not only by a comprehensive film retrospective but also by the video installation "Details". The special program Carl Mayer Screenwriting Prize 2017 "Shooting Women II" on female forms of documentary, the historical special on US actor and cinematographer Charles Korvin in the series "FilmExil" as well as the eagerly awaited revival of Michael Synek's Die toten Fische from 1989 were also well received by the audience. The discussion track focused in several program points on the status quo of film criticism and different positions of film discourse. At the Kunsthaus Graz, Sofie Thorsen showed the exhibition "Schnitt A-A". As part of the industry meeting "Discussing Diversity in Independent Cinema," numerous internationally staffed panels and case studies discussed different perspectives and strategies of film promotion and exploitation against the backdrop of practical experience and initiated further activities in Austria.

In 2013, the 16th edition of the festival took place from March 12 to 17 and was opened by Ulrich Seidl's Paradies: Hoffnung. A total of 156 films were shown in 136 screenings, 98 of which were in competition. Compared to the previous year, the Diagonale had 25,051 visitors (about 18,900 cinema admissions and about 6,000 people at the supporting programs), an increase of 1,300 visitors, while the occupancy rate dropped from 74 to 72 percent. The prizes awarded were worth about 155,000 euros. After a cinematic year marked by major international successes for Austrian film, attention at the 2013 Diagonale focused on the numerous promising productions by young filmmakers, whose individual approaches provided a breath of fresh air. Highlights also included the presentation of Ulrich Seidl's Paradise Trilogy as a complete work and two "Personale" dedicated to Josef Dabernig and Michaela Grill. With Dominik Graf there was an exceptional figure of the German-language production landscape in Graz. The continuation of the "FilmExil" series focused on the film work of Viennese director, screenwriter, and producer Paul Czinner. The special program "Austrian Pulp" presented subversive Austrian underground cinema between genres. The industry meeting was devoted to "Models of Substance and Project Development" with the participation of numerous international experts.

The 17th edition of the Diagonale opened in Graz with the Austrian premiere of Johannes Holzhausen's documentary Das große Museum. While in 2013 the focus was on numerous feature film premieres, this time, in line with the trend of the production year, the documentary film moved into the spotlight with 23 productions in competition. In total, the festival screened 192 films from March 18 to 23, 2014, 106 of which were in competition. Despite bright spring weather, a slight increase in audience attendance could again be reported after six days with around 25,500 visitors. The value of the film prizes awarded amounted to around 165,000 euros. The "Personale" was dedicated to the film artist Manfred Neuwirth. The renowned French cinematographer Agnès Godard was honored with a retrospective. The special programs on James Benning, Peter Lorre, the continuation of "Austrian Pulp" and the show "Another Country" on the occasion of the fiftieth anniversary of the Austrian Film Museum were well received by the public. The motto of the industry gathering was "Digital Revolution Meets Reality." As always, the festival positioned itself as an indispensable place of encounter and exchange between the film industry and the public. Ten years after the "resistance" Diagonale, protest was once again stirring. In a petition addressed to the governing parties and the management of the ORF, numerous representatives of the film industry warned of the immediate effects of impending funding cuts.

The Diagonale 2015 took place from March 17 to 22. The festival was held for the last time under the direction of Barbara Pichler, who retired from this position after seven years. Around 27,000 visitors were registered and 50 world premieres and 25 Austrian premieres were shown. In the competition 97 films were screened, a total of 157 films were shown. The festival was opened by Karl Markovics' feature film Superwelt. A highlight was the "Personale" dedicated to documentary filmmaker Nikolaus Geyrhalter. The international tribute guest was French director and author Mia Hansen-Løve. The special film history programs were devoted to the expelled avant-garde, the work of Alfred Kaiser and the tense relationship between film and history. Other specials were devoted to the rediscovered TV series Draußen in der Stadt, written by Günter Brödl, and to the two filmmakers Florian Flicker and Michael Glawogger, who had died the year before. The industry meeting addressed issues of film financing and film funding.

==== Directors Sebastian Höglinger and Peter Schernhuber (2016–2023) ====
The Diagonale 2016 took place from March 8 to 13 and was directed for the first time by Sebastian Höglinger and Peter Schernhuber. The two relied on a balance between continuity and new impulses and set a new record with 30,200 visitors. Two new program tracks, a new image, increased cooperation with local initiatives and institutions, and a newly established festival district contributed to the renewal. A total of 158 films were screened, 107 of them in competition. The festival opened with the world premiere of Mirjam Unger's Maikäfer flieg, based on the novel by Christine Nöstlinger. The new series "Spotlight on" focused on producer Gabriele Kranzelbinder. The provocatively titled historical special program "Austria: Forget it" was dedicated to a central phase of Austrian film and contemporary history: the Waldheim years. The new festival program "In Reference", in which U.S. indie director Matt Porterfield was a guest, opened up a wide range of references within the program. The Diagonale Film Meeting developed strategies for more equality and social diversity in film and television.

In 2017, the Diagonale took place for the twentieth time in Graz from March 28 to April 2. The festival was opened by Michael Glawogger's documentary Untitled, which film editor Monika Willi completed after Glawogger's unexpected death in 2014. A total of 191 films were shown, 106 of which competed in the competition for the Diagonale awards. These had a total value of around 195,000 euros. For the first time, the Franz Grabner Prize was awarded in the categories of cinema and television documentaries as part of the Diagonale. In the programming, cross-genre short film programs, and supporting films took account of the trend toward the merging of film genres. Thus, experimental works, music videos, feature films, and documentaries were positioned in relation to each other in the competition. With 31,200 visitors, the Diagonale was able to once again increase the audience response from the previous year (2016: 30,200). There was much positive feedback on the special historical program "1000 Beat Film", which looked for influences of pop culture on Austrian film and vice versa. The series "Spotlight on" focused on the integration figure Andi Winter, a filmmaker from the supposed second tier. U.S. director Ana Lily Amirpour presented her latest work The Bad Batch in Graz and held a master class. At the Diagonale Film Meeting, industry representatives from various sectors and functions shed light on the popularity and potential of Austrian film at home. The new discussion format "Diagonale im Dialog" brought illustrious personalities of the film world to the festival cinemas for extended talks.

In 2018, the Diagonale took place from March 13 to 18, with the opening film being Murer – Anatomy of a Trial by Christian Frosch.

The 2019 Diagonale, from March 19 to 24, opened with Der Boden unter den Füßen by Marie Kreutzer.

In 2020, the Diagonale, originally scheduled for March 24 to 29, was cancelled due to the COVID-19 pandemic. The award winners were announced on June 30, 2020. Films from the program of the cancelled Festival of Austrian Film were presented in spring, summer, and fall as part of the series "Diagonale'20 – 'Die Unvollendete' on Tour" at various stations across Austria and on the web.

In April 2020, the contracts of Sebastian Höglinger and Peter Schernhuber as festival directors were extended until 2022. The dual leadership will thus preside over the Festival of Austrian Film up to and including Diagonale'22. The position of artistic director will be advertised in summer 2021.

The 2021 edition, originally scheduled for March 16 to 21, was to open with the feature film Fuchs im Bau by Arman T. Riahi. Due to the COVID-19 pandemic, the edition was postponed to June 8 to 13, 2021.

== Awards ==
The Festival of Austrian Film offers the film awards in various categories totalling over €170,000.-.

Jury awards of the Diagonale
Category	donated by	since	Endowment (in Euro, 2020)
Grand Diagonale Prize of the Province of Styria: Best Feature Film	Province of Styria/Culture; The Grand Post; Mischief Films	2006	21.000
Grand Diagonale Prize of the Province of Styria: Best Documentary Film	Province of Styria/Culture; The Grand Post; Mischief Films	2006	21.000
Diagonale Prize for Innovative Cinema by the City of Graz: Best Innovative, Experimental, or Animated Film	City of Graz/Culture; Golden Girls Filmproduktion	1998	8.500
Diagonale Prize for Short Feature: Best Short Feature Film	Muchar Upcycles; The Grand Post	2011	5.500
Diagonale Prize for Short Documentary from the Diocese of Graz-Seckau: Best Short Documentary Film	Roman Catholic Diocese of Graz-Seckau	2001	4.000
Diagonale Prize from the Youth Jury of the Province of Styria: Best Young Talent Film	Province of Styria/Youth; Stöger Kameras	1998	5.500
Grand Diagonale Prize for Acting	Verwertungsgesellschaft der Filmschaffenden	2008	Artwork
Diagonale Acting Prizes for remarkable acting by an Austrian actor in a Diagonale competition film	Verwertungsgesellschaft der Filmschaffenden	2008	3.000
Diagonale Acting Prizes for remarkable acting by an Austrian actress in a Diagonale competition film	Verwertungsgesellschaft der Filmschaffenden	2011	3.000
Awards of the professional associations
Category	donated by	since	Endowment
Diagonale Prize for Editing (Austrian Editors Association AEA): Best Artistic Editing of a Feature Film	Verwertungsgesellschaft der Filmschaffenden	2007	3.000
Diagonale Prize for Editing (Austrian Editors Association AEA): Best Artistic Editing of a Documentary Film	Verwertungsgesellschaft der Filmschaffenden	2007	3.000
Diagonale Cinematographers Prize (Austrian Association of Cinematographers AAC): Best Cinematography of a Feature Film	Verwertungsgesellschaft der Filmschaffenden	2006	3.000
Diagonale Cinematographers Prize (Austrian Association of Cinematographers AAC): Best Cinematography of a Documentary Film	Verwertungsgesellschaft der Filmschaffenden	2006	3.000
Diagonale Prize for Production Design and Costume Design (Austrian Filmdesigners Association VÖF): Best Production Design	Verwertungsgesellschaft der Filmschaffenden	2011	3.000
Diagonale Prize for Production Design and Costume Design (Austrian Filmdesigners Association VÖF): Best Costume Design	Verwertungsgesellschaft der Filmschaffenden	2011	3.000
Diagonale Prize for Sound Design (Verband österreichischer Filmtonschaffender Filmton Austria): Best Sound Design of a Feature Film	Verwertungsgesellschaft der Filmschaffenden	2013	3.000
Diagonale Prize for Sound Design (Verband österreichischer Filmtonschaffender Filmton Austria): Best Sound Design of a Documentary Film	Verwertungsgesellschaft der Filmschaffenden	2013	3.000
Other award ceremonies within the framework of the Diagonale
Category	donated by	since	Endowment
Prize for Outstanding Production Services from the Verwertungsgesellschaft für Audiovisuelle Medien (VAM) for outstanding production services in the area of film	Verwertungsgesellschaft für Audiovisuelle Medien (VAM)	2002	20.000
Audience Prize: Most Popular Diagonale Film of the Year	Kleine Zeitung	2007	3.000
Carl Mayer Screenwriting Prize	City of Graz/Culture	1990 (*)	15.000
Carl Mayer Screenwriting Prize for New Authors	City of Graz/Culture	1994 (*)	7.500
Thomas Pluch Screenwriting Prize	Bundeskanzleramt	1993	12.000
Thomas Pluch Screenwriting Prize Special Prize by the Jury	Bundeskanzleramt	2014	7.000
Thomas Pluch Screenwriting Prize for Short or Medium Length Feature Films	Bundeskanzleramt	2014	3.000
Franz Grabner Prize Cinema Documentary	Franz-Grabner-Board	2017	5.000
Franz Grabner Prize Television Documentary	Franz-Grabner-Board	2017	5.000
(*) since 2000 the award ceremony has been held as part of the Diagonale

== Award winners ==
In the context of the Diagonale, expert juries award Austria's most highly endowed film prizes, including the two Grand Diagonale Prizes of the province of Styria (€21,000 each).

=== Grand Diagonale Prize ===
Grand Diagonale Prize
Year	Director		Best Austrian Cinema film	
1998	Florian Flicker		Suzie Washington	
1999	Nikolaus Geyrhalter		Pripyat	
2000	Barbara Albert; Goran Rebić		Northern Skirts; The Punishment	
2001	Florian Flicker		Hold-Up	
2002	Fritz Lehner		Everyman's Feast	
2003	Andrea Maria Dusl		Blue Moon	
2004	Martin Bruch		handbikemovie	
2005	Jessica Hausner		Hotel	
Year	Director	Best Documentary Film	Director	Best Feature Film
2006	Tizza Covi and Rainer Frimmel; Arash T. Riahi	Babooska; Exile Family Movie	Michael Haneke	Caché
2007	Peter Schreiner	Bellavista	Jakob M. Erwa	Heile Welt
2008	Marko Doringer	Mein halbes Leben	Götz Spielmann	Revanche
2009	Constantin Wulff	In die Welt	Michael Glawogger	Das Vaterspiel
2010	Brigitte Weich and Karin Macher	Hana, dul, sed …	Tizza Covi and Rainer Frimmel	La Pivellina
2011	Ivette Löcker	Nachtschichten	Marie Kreutzer	The Fatherless
2012	Dariusz Kowalski	Richtung Nowa Huta	Sebastian Meise	Stillleben
2013	Bernadette Weigel	Fahrtwind – Aufzeichnungen einer Reisenden	Tizza Covi and Rainer Frimmel	Der Glanz des Tages
2014	Ruth Beckermann	Those Who Go Those Who Stay	Houchang Allahyari	Der letzte Tanz
2015	Nikolaus Geyrhalter	Über die Jahre	Veronika Franz and Severin Fiala	Goodnight Mommy
2016	Sigmund Steiner	Holz Erde Fleisch	Ruth Beckermann	Die Geträumten
2017	Ivette Löcker	Was uns bindet	Lukas Valenta Rinner	Die Liebhaberin
2018	Nikolaus Geyrhalter	Die bauliche Maßnahme	Christian Frosch	Murer – Anatomy of a Trial
2019	Nathalie Borgers	The Remains – Nach der Odyssee	Sara Fattahi	Chaos
2020	Sabine Derflinger	Die Dohnal	Sandra Wollner	The Trouble With Being Born

=== Diagonale Prize for Innovative Cinema ===
Diagonale Prize for Innovative Cinema by the City of Graz: Best Innovative, Experimental, or Animated Film
Year	Director	Title
1998	Kathrin Resetarits; Martin Arnold	Ägypten; Alone – Life Wastes Andy Hardy
1999	Peter Tscherkassky	Outer Space
2000	Fiona Rukschcio, Elke Groen, Wolfgang Widerhofer, and Ralph Wieser	Die Kunst der Stunde ist Widerstand
2001	Kollektiv "Die Kunst der Stunde ist Widerstand" (lit. Collective "The art of the hour is resistance") and Verein "Echo" (lit. Association "Echo")	Für ihre Medienarbeit (lit. For their work in media)
2002	Michael Palm	Sea Concrete Human – Malfunctions #1
2003	Mara Mattuschka	id
2004	Brigitta Bödenauer; Didi Bruckmayr and Michael Strohmann	don't touch me when I start to feel save; ich bin traurig
2005	Gerhard Friedl	Hat Wolff von Amerongen Konkursdelikte begangen?
2006	Tina Frank; lia; Gabriele Mathes	Chronomops; int.16/45//son01/30x1; Eine Million Kredit ist normal, sagt mein Großvater
2007	Jan Machacek and Martin Siewert; Manuel Knapp	erase remake; visibility of interim
2008	Mara Mattuschka; Johann Lurf	Running Sushi; Vertigo Rush
2009	Michael Palm	Laws of Physics
2010	Sabine Marte	B-star, untötbar! reloaded
2011	Billy Roisz	Chiles en Nogada
2012	Josef Dabernig	Hypercrisis
2013	Michaela Grill	FORÊT D'EXPÉRIMENTATION
2014	Lukas Marxt	High Tide
2015	Sasha Pirker and Lotte Schreiber	Exhibition Talks
2016	Antoinette Zwirchmayr	Josef – Täterprofil meines Vaters
2017	Katrina Daschner	Pferdebusen
2018	Johann Lurf	★
2019	Jennifer Mattes	Wreckage takes a holiday
2020	Constanze Ruhm	GLI APPUNTI DI ANNA AZZORI – Uno specchio che viaggia nel tempo

=== Diagonale Prize from the Youth Jury ===
Diagonale Prize from the Youth Jury of the Province of Styria: Best Young Talent Film
Year	Director	Title
1998	Nana Swiczinsky	Wieder Hohlung
1999	Georg Wasner	Postwendend keine Kugel ins Herz
2000	Siegfried A. Fruhauf	Höhenrausch
2001	Kerstin Cmelka	Mit mir
2002	Birgit Foerster	Au clair de la lune
2003	Sebastian Meise	Prises de vues
2004	Karl Bretschneider	Grauzone
2005	Michael Ramsauer	Echos
2006	Anna Martinetz	Stadtutopien oder die Legende von Synia
2007	Andrina Mračnikar	Der Kärntner spricht Deutsch
2008	Carola Schmidt; Jakob M. Erwa	Wir bitten Dich, verführe uns!; Honorable Mention: Tschuschen:power
2009	Marvin Kren	Schautag
2010	Hüseyin Tabak	Kick Off
2011	Max Liebich	You're Out
2012	Conrad Tambour	Der Besuch
2013	Matthias Zuder	Erbgut
2014	Britta Schoening, Michaela Taschek, and Sandra Wollner	Uns geht es gut
2015	Lukas Valenta Rinner	Parabellum
2016	Jasmin Baumgartner	Unmensch
2017	Santiago Rodriguez Duran	Revolución Solar
2018	Bernhard Wenger	Entschuldigung, ich suche den Tischtennisraum und meine Freundin
2019	Nicolas Pindeus	Zufall & Notwendigkeit
2020	Özgür Anil	Das Urteil im Fall K.

=== Diagonale Prize for Short Feature and Short Documentary Film ===
Diagonale Prize for Short Feature Film and Short Documentary Film from the Diocese of Graz-Seckau
Year	Director		Title	
2001	Joerg Burger		Moscouw	
2002	Egon Humer		Amos Vogel. Mosaik im Vertrauen	
2003	Andrina Mračnikar		Andri 1924 – 1944	
2004	Gerald Harringer		MA	
2005	Ascan Breuer, Ursula Hansbauer, and Wolfgang Konrad		Forst	
2006	Sepp Dreissinger		artgenossen. 35minutenporträts	
2007	Judith Zdesar		Bilder aus dem Tagebuch eines Wartenden	
2008	Emanuel Danesch		livesafelyineurope	
2009	Bernhard Braunstein, David Groß		Pharao Bipolar	
2010	Juliane Großheim		Die Kinder vom Friedrichshof	
Year	Director	Short Feature	Director	Short Documentary
2011	Umut Dağ	Papa	Karl-Heinz Klopf	They
2012	Catalina Molina	Unser Lied	Houchang Allahyari	Das persische Krokodil
2013	Florian Pochlatko	Erdbeerland	Friedemann Derschmidt	Das Phantom der Erinnerung
2014	Stefan Bohun	Musik	Antoinette Zwirchmayr	Der Zuhälter und seine Trophäen
2015	Jannis Lenz	Schattenboxer	Lisbeth Kovacic	minor border
2016	Maria Luz Olivares Capelle	Wald der Echos	Clara Trischler	Zuhause ist kein Ort
2017	Clara Stern	Mathias	Kristina Schranz	Spielfeld
2018	Bernhard Wenger	Entschuldigung, ich suche den Tischtennisraum und meine Freundin	Kristina Schranz	Ars Moriendi oder die Kunst des Lebens
2019	Raphaela Schmid	ENE MENE	Johannes Gierlinger	Remapping the origins
2020	Raphaela Schmid	Fische	Total Refusal (Robin Klengel, Leonhard Müllner, and Michael Stumpf)	How to Disappear

=== Diagonale Acting Prizes ===
On the initiative of the Verwertungsgesellschaft der Filmschaffenden , the Diagonale Acting Prizes have been awarded since 2008. The Grand Diagonale Acting Prize is awarded for services to Austrian film culture, whereas the Diagonale Acting Prize is awarded for a remarkable performance in a film of the respective Diagonale year. The trophy for the Grand Diagonale Acting Award is designed each year by an Austrian artist. 2008: Erwin Wurm, 2009: Elke Krystufek, 2010: Brigitte Kowanz, 2011: Peter Kogler, 2012: Elfie Semotan, 2013: Herbert Brandl, 2014: Eva Schlegel, 2015: Heimo Zobernig, 2016: Anna Paul, 2017: Stefanie Moshammer, 2018: Toni Schmale, 2019: Ashley Hans Scheirl, 2020: Daniel Spoerri.

Since 2010, the Diagonale Acting Prize has been awarded to both an actor and an actress.

Diagonale Acting Prizes
Year	Diagonale Acting Prize	Diagonale Acting Prize
1999	Roland Düringer for Hinterholz 8	Sabrina Riedel for Beastie Girl
Year	Grand Diagonale Acting Prize	Diagonale Acting Prize
2008	Karl Markovics for The Counterfeiters	Ursula Strauss for Revanche
2009	Josef Hader among others for The Bone Man	Birgit Minichmayr for The Bone Man
2010	Klaus Maria Brandauer for his lifetime achievement	Franziska Weisz for The Robber; Andreas Lust for The Robber
2011	Senta Berger for her lifetime achievement	Marion Mitterhammer for The Fatherless; Johannes Krisch for The Fatherless, Vielleicht in einem anderen Leben, and Kottan ermittelt: Rien ne va plus
2012	Johannes Silberschneider	Christine Ostermayer for Anfang 80; Michael Fuith for Michael
2013	Maria Hofstätter	Johanna Orsini-Rosenberg for Soldate Jeannette; Johannes Nussbaum for Diamantenfieber oder Kauf dir einen bunten Luftballon
2014	Georg Friedrich	Erni Mangold for Der letzte Tanz; Gerhard Liebmann for Blood Glacier, The Dark Valley, and Bad Fucking
2015	Tobias Moretti	Ulrike Beimpold for Superwelt; Murathan Muslu for Risse im Beton
2016	Erni Mangold	Ursula Strauss for Fly Away Home; Erwin Steinhauer for Thank You for Bombing
2017	Johannes Krisch	Verena Altenberger for Die beste aller Welten; Philipp Hochmair for Tomcat
2018	Ingrid Burkhard	The entire acting ensembles of L'Animale and Cops
2019	Birgit Minichmayr	Joy Alphonsus for Joy; Simon Frühwirth for Nevrland
2020	Ursula Strauss	Julia Franz Richter for Der Taucher; Dominik Warta for The Trouble with Being Born

=== Diagonale Cinematographers Prize ===
The Association of Austrian Cinematographers awarded the AAC Prize for the best camera work of the year at the Diagonale in 2004 and 2005. For the association's thirtieth anniversary in 2006, two prizes were awarded for the first time, in the categories Best Cinematography Feature Film and Documentary Film, as the Diagonale Prize Cinematography. Since 2014 they have been endowed with 3,000 euros each.

Diagonale Cinematographers Prize (Austrian Association of Cinematographers AAC)
Year	AAC Award Best Cinematography			
2004	Bernhard Keller		Struggle	
2005	Johannes Hammel and Rafael Ortega		Volver la Vista	
Year	Best Cinematography of a Feature Film		Best Cinematography of a Documentary	
2006	Martin Gschlacht	Spiele Leben	Wolfgang Thaler	Workingman's Death
2007	Bernhard Keller	Fallen	Jo Molitoris	Kurz davor ist es passiert
2008	Martin Gschlacht	Revanche	Joerg Burger	Der Weg nach Mekka
2009	Enzo Brandner	Universalove	Nikolaus Geyrhalter	7915 km
2010	Christian Berger	The White Ribbon	Peter Schreiner	Totó
2011	Leena Koppe	The Fatherless	Elfi Mikesch	MONDO LUX – Die Bilderwelten des Werner Schroeter
2012	Gerald Kerkletz	Stillleben and Michael	Joerg Burger	The Future's Past – Creating Cambodia
2013	Wolfgang Thaler and Ed Lachman	Paradise: Love	Bernadette Weigel	Fahrtwind – Aufzeichnungen einer Reisenden
2014	Thomas Kiennast	The Dark Valley	Joerg Burger and Attila Boa	Das große Museum
2015	Michael Bindlechner	Superwelt	Manfred Neuwirth	Aus einem nahen Land
2016	Gerald Kerkletz	WINWIN	Kurdwin Ayub	Paradies! Paradies!
2017	Wolfgang Thaler and Sebastian Thaler	Ugly	Attila Boa	Untitled
2018	Mariel Baqueiro	Hagazussa	Serafin Spitzer	Gwendolyn
2019	Klemens Hufnagl	Bewegungen eines nahen Bergs	Christiana Perschon	Sie ist der andere Blick
2020	Thimios Bakatakis	The Lodge	Yunus Roy Imer	Space Dogs

=== Diagonale Prize for Editing ===
Since 2005, the Austrian Editors Association (aea) has awarded a prize for the best artistic montage in a Diagonale competition film. In 2006, two editing prizes were awarded for the first time, in the categories Feature Film and Documentary Film. Since 2014, these prizes have been endowed with 3,000 euros each and are awarded by the jury of the Grand Diagonale Prize Best Feature Film and the Grand Diagonale Prize Best Documentary Film, respectively.

Diagonale Prize for Editing Austrian Editors Association AEA
Year	Best Artistic Editing			
2005	Denise Vindevogel		Darwin's Nightmare	
Year	Best Artistic Editing of a Feature Film		Best Artistic Editing of a Documentary	
2006	Nina Kusturica and Bernhard Schmid	Kotsch	Dieter Pichler	No Name City
2007	Oliver Neumann	Immer nie am Meer	Alarich Lenz	Meine liebe Republik
2008	Christoph Schertenleib	Import/Export	Martin Hasenöhrl	drent und herent
2009	Anja Schürenberg	Rimini	Michèle Barbin	Pianomania
2010	Gerhard Fillei and Joachim Krenn	New York: November (South)	Michael Palm	Jobcenter
2011	Evi Romen	My Best Enemy	Wolfgang Widerhofer	Abendland
2012	Wolfgang Widerhofer	Michael	Dieter Pichler	American Passages
2013	Peter Brunner	Mein blindes Herz	Alexandra Schneider	Fahrtwind – Aufzeichnungen einer Reisenden
2014	Karina Ressler	October November	Dieter Pichler	Das große Museum
2015	Karin Hammer	Von jetzt an kein Zurück	Wolfgang Widerhofer	Über die Jahre
2016	Dieter Pichler	Die Geträumten	Andreas Horvath	Helmut Berger, Actor
2017	Ulrike Kofler, Monika Willi and Christoph Brunner	Wild Mouse	Christin Veith and Cordula Thym	Relativ eigenständig
2018	Niki Mossböck	Licht and Life Guidance	Joana Scrinzi	Gwendolyn and Nicht von schlechten Eltern
2019	Peter Schreiner	Garten	Arthur Summereder	DIE TAGE WIE DAS JAHR
2020	Hannes Bruun	The Trouble With Being Born	Friederike Berat	WE DID WHAT HAD TO BE DONE

=== Diagonale Prize for Production Design and Costume Design ===
On the initiative of the Austrian Filmdesigners Association VÖF, prizes for film design were awarded for the first time at the Diagonale in 2011 for Best Production Design and Best Costume Design. The prizes each consist of a cash prize, 3,000 euros, donated by the Verwertungsgesellschaft der Filmschaffenden VdFS, and a bronze sculpture by the artist Lotte Schegsch.

Diagonale Prize for Production Design and Costume Design (Austrian Filmdesigners Association VÖF)
Year	Best Production Design		Best Costume Design	
2011	Andrea Schratzberger	Folge mir	Veronika Albert	Tag und Nacht
2012	Katrin Huber and Gerhard Dohr	Michael	Katharina Wöppermann	Stillleben
2013	Renate Martin and Andreas Donhauser	Paradise: Love	Monika Buttinger	Talea
2014	Christina Schaffer	Fieber	Theresa Ebner-Lazek	Die Werkstürmer
2015	Isidor Wimmer	Superwelt	Martina List	Life Eternal
2016	Laura Weiss	WINWIN	Alexandra Trummer	Jack
2017	Veronika Merlin	Die beste aller Welten	Monika Buttinger	Die Migrantigen
2018	Paul Horn	Phaidros	Peter Paradies and Moritz M. Polansky	Phaidros
2019	Andreas Sobotka und Martin Reiter	Angelo	Carola Pizzini	Joy
2020	Katharina Wöppermann	Little Joe	Monika Buttinger	Ein bisschen bleiben wir noch

=== Diagonale Prize for Sound Design ===
On the occasion of the tenth anniversary of the former Association of Austrian Sound Designers (VOESD), prizes were awarded for the first time at Diagonale 2013 for the best Sound Design in the Feature and Documentary Film categories. The prize consists of a cash prize, 3,000 euros each, donated by Verwertungsgesellschaft der Filmschaffenden VdFS.

Diagonale Prize for Sound Design (Verband österreichischer Filmtonschaffender Filmton Austria)
Year	Best Sound Design of a Feature Film		Best Sound Design of a Documentary	
2013	Gerhard Daurer, Peter Kutin and Andreas Pils	Soldate Jeannette	Max Liebich	Fahrtwind – Aufzeichnungen einer Reisenden
2014	Christoph Amann	Shirley – Visionen der Realität	José Miguel Enriquez and Alejandro de Icaza	Calle López
2015	Stefan Deisenberger	Bad Luck	Manfred Neuwirth and Christian Fennesz	Aus einem nahen Land
2016	Charlie Campagna	Los Feliz	Selma Doborac	Those Shocking Shaking Days
2017	Nahuel Palenque	Die Liebhaberin	Peter Kutin and Florian Kindlinger	Homo Sapiens
2018	Niklas Kammertöns	Hagazussa	Sergey Martynyuk	Zu ebener Erde
2019	Pia Dumont	Angelo	Florian Kindlinger	Erde
2020	Peter Kutin	The Trouble With Being Born	Florian Kofler	Sicherheit123

=== Diagonale Audience Prize ===
Diagonale Audience Prize Kleine Zeitung: Most Popular Diagonale Film of the Year
Year	Director	Title
1993	Robert Adrian Pejo	Lipstick
1994	Andreas Gruber	The Quality of Mercy
1995	Egon Humer	Emigration N.Y.
2007	Mirjam Unger	Vienna's Lost Daughters
2009	Marco Antoniazzi	Kleine Fische
2010	Hüseyin Tabak	Kick Off
2011	Arman T. Riahi	Schwarzkopf
2012	Bernd Liepold-Mosser	Griffen – auf den Spuren von Peter Handke
2013	Marco Antoniazzi and Gregor Stadlober	Schlagerstar
2014	Gloria Dürnberger	Das Kind in der Schachtel
2015	Christian Frosch	Von jetzt an kein Zurück
2016	Arash T. Riahi and Arman T. Riahi	Kinders
2017	Adrian Goiginger	Die beste aller Welten
2018	Stefan A. Lukacs	Cops
2019	Jakob Brossmann and David Paede	GEHÖRT, GESEHEN – Ein Radiofilm
2020	Not awarded.	Not awarded. The Diagonale'20 was cancelled by official decree due to the COVID-19 pandemic.
2021	Fabian Eder	Der schönste Tag
2022	Andrina Mračnikar	Verschwinden / Izginjanje
2023	Katharina Mückstein	Feminism WTF

=== Prize for Outstanding Production Services ===
The prize, worth 22,000 euros, has been awarded since 2002 by the Verwertungsgesellschaft für audiovisuelle Medien (VAM) to an Austrian film production company or film producer for outstanding production services in the area of film. Either a specific film or the annual production of a film company is honored.

Prize for Outstanding Production Services from the VAM – Verwertungsgesellschaft für Audiovisuelle Medien
Year	Awarded for	Awardee
2002	Nogo	Dor Film, Danny Krausz and Kurt Stocker
2003	Elsewhere; On the Other Side of the Bridge	Nikolaus Geyrhalter Filmproduktion and Nikolaus Geyrhalter; SK Film- und Fernsehproduktion and Josef Koschier
2004	Not awarded	–
2005	For their production output during the year	coop99
2006	Representative of their production output during the year: We Feed the World; Workingman's Death	Allegro Film; Lotus Film
2007	Dead in 3 Days	Allegro Film
2008	–	Wulf Flemming; Florian Gebhardt
2009	Lilly the Witch: The Dragon and the Magic Book; Echte Wiener	Dor Film; Bonus Film
2010	Plastic Planet; The Bone Man and Desert Flower; The White Ribbon	Neue Sentimental Film; Dor Film; Wega Film
2011	The Unintentional Kidnapping of Mrs. Elfriede Ott; The Robber	Dor Film; Nikolaus Geyrhalter Filmproduktion
2012	Breathing	Epo-Film
2013	Amour	Wega Film
2014	Alphabet; The Last of the Unjust	Prisma Film; Dor Film
2015	The Dark Valley; Macondo	Allegro Film; FreibeuterFilm
2016	Thank You for Bombing; Einer von uns	Lotus Film; Golden Girls Filmproduktion
2017	Bauer unser; Mister Universo; Wild Mouse	Allegro Film; Vento Film; Wega Film
2018	Die beste aller Welten; Hilfe, ich hab meine Eltern geschrumpft	RitzlFilm; Minifilm
2019	Womit haben wir das verdient?; Manaslu – Berg der Seelen	Mona Film; Planet Watch Film and Video Productions
2020	Little Joe; Die Dohnal	coop99; Plan C Filmproduktion and Derflinger Film

=== Carl Mayer Screenwriting Prizes ===
The Carl Mayer Screenwriting Prizes have been awarded biennially since 1990 and annually since 1998. Since 2000, the award ceremony has been held as part of the Diagonale. It goes back to an initiative by Bernhard Frankfurter and is the most highly endowed screenwriting prize in Austria with 15,000 euros (since 1999, when it was increased to 200,000 schillings). Each competition has a new theme to which the anonymously submitted, not yet filmed screenplays must relate. In addition, the fictional or documentary material must be elaborated in a way suitable for cinema, the story must be true to life, well researched and well thought out, and the cinematographic potential must be exploited in all its facets, including formally.

In the first two competitions, only the Carl Mayer Screenwriting Prize was awarded. Since 1994, a prize of 7,500 euros for new authors has also been awarded. Both prizes are donated by the City of Graz. From 2000 to 2007, the ORF prize for material suitable for television, worth 4,000 euros, was also awarded as part of the Carl Mayer Screenwriting Prizes. Prior to that, material suitable for television was merely mentioned with praise in the jury's announcement. The prizes are only awarded if the jury can identify a script from the submitted scripts that meets the criteria. For this purpose, the jury may award several prizes in some years, or two prizes for new authors instead of one main prize (as happened in 2002).

Carl Mayer Screenwriting Prize
Year	Theme	Carl Mayer Screenwriting Prize		Carl Mayer Screenwriting Prize for New Authors	
Year	Theme	Director	Title	Director	Title
1990	Exil (lit. exile)	Reinhard Jud and Martina Kudláček	Mond in Cyan	–	–
1992	Geld (lit. money)	Ernst Josef Lauscher; Nikolaus Leytner; Axel Traun	Alaska brennt; Schatz im Silbersee; Sticky Rice	–	–
1994	Krieg, Gewalt und Widerstand (lit. war, violence and resistance)	Maximilian Gruber	Der eiserne Besen	Christian Frosch	Die totale Therapie
1996	Österreich (lit. Austria)	Norbert Prettenthaler and Jeanette Rosenmaier; Florian Flicker and Michael Sturminger; Barbara Albert	Cordoba; Im Herzen Europas; Northern Skirts	−	−
1998	Sucht (lit. addiction)	Gebhard Rein	Das Wurmsterben	Sabine Derflinger	Troubles
1999	Eros (lit. Eros)	Franz Berner	Venus ohne Pelz und Maske	Zuzana Brejcha	Karla's Lover
2000	Erinnern versus Vergessen (lit. remembering versus forgetting)	Gabriele Neudecker	Namenlos	Peter Stastny and Helmut Wimmer	TikkunAkt
2001	Pfusch (lit. botched)	Gregor Stadlober	Kotsch	Richard Stradner; Arno Geiger and Tobias Albrecht	Böhmische Elefanten; Steinwald und Atamanov
2002	Wir denken. Wir sind. Wir handeln. (lit. We think. We are. We act.)	−	−	Ursula Wolschlager; Thomas Klein	Transit; Polterabend
2003	Feigheit (lit. cowardice)	−	−	Barbara Grascher; Richard Schuberth	Gehen rückwärts stumm; Nicht einmal am Mond
2004	Gier (lit. greed)	Richard Schuberth	Handy-Geschichten	Simone Schönett, Harald Schwinger	Innere Liebe
2005	Angst (lit. fear)	Andrina Mračnikar; Martin Leidenfrost and Ruth Mader	Ma Folie; Serviam – Ich will dienen	Christian Frosch	Vanitas
2006	Verführung (lit. seduction)	Thomas Weingartner	Immer nie am Meer	Lilly Jäckl	Ildiko
2007	Bewegung (lit. movement)	Thomas Reider	Stillleben	Christoph Hochenbichler and Josef Pallwein-Prettner	Fünf Leben
2008	Sexappeal (lit. sex appeal)	Markus Mörth	Pony	−	−
2009	Neid (lit. envy)	Richard Schuberth	Claudia schafft das schon	Albert Meisl	Nur ein Spiel
2010	Arm und reich (lit. poor and rich)	Wolfgang Rupert Muhr	Grossmattglocknerhorn	Henning Backhaus	Kinderszenen
2011	Aufbruch (lit. departure)	Jakob Pretterhofer	Überleben	Markus Mörth	Geschwister (2016)
2012	Empörung (lit. indignation)	Christoph Brunner; Kevin Lutz	Constantin Nikolaus; Bickermann	Hüseyin Tabak	Es war einmal in Wien
2013	Game Over (lit. game over)	Monja Art	Siebzehn	Achmed Abdel-Salam	Der Rand
2014	Verrat (lit. betrayal)	-	-	Tina Leisch; Wolfgang Rupert Muhr; Rainer Weidlinger	Vom Anblick der Waffen versprach ich mir Hände; Mehr als allein; Reise nach Mond
2015	Täuschung (lit. illusion)	Siegmund Skalar	Die Stille	Matthias Writze and Michael Podogil	The Power of Love
2016	Gnadenlos (lit. merciless)	Clara Stern	Training	Franziska Pflaum and Roman Gielke	Schneegestöber
2017	Anders (lit. different)	Evi Romen	Hochwald	Nikolaus Müller	Rote Wand
2018	Loyalität (lit. loyalty)	Johannes Höß and Clara Stern	Hacklerstreich	Tizza Covi	Artikel 640
2019	Infam (lit. infamous)	Jessica Lind	Der Tag, an dem der Regen kam	Ulrike Kofler	Full House
2020	Reiberei (lit. friction)	Josef Kleindienst	Die Verkündung	Jan Prazak	Flat Mates

Carl Mayer Screenwriting Prize: ORF prize for material suitable for TV
Year	Theme	Director	Title
2000	Erinnern versus Vergessen (lit. remembering versus forgetting)	Uwe Neuhold, Thomas Klein	Memorex
2001	Pfusch (lit. botched)	−	−
2002	Wir denken. Wir sind. Wir handeln. (lit. We think. We are. We act.)	Daniela Egger	World Wide Violence
2003	Feigheit (lit. cowardice)	Ulla Neuwirther	Lisa, Lena und Laura
2004	Gier (lit. greed)	Bernd Schneider	Abidjan
2005	Angst (lit. fear)	−	−
2006	Verführung (lit. seduction)	Susanne Rendl	Magda's Dilemma
2007	Bewegung (lit. movement)	Ulla Neuwirther	Running Sushi

=== Franz Grabner Award ===
Since 2017 the Franz Grabner Award ceremony has been held as part of the festival.

Franz Grabner Award
Year	Franz Grabner Award Cinema Documentary		Franz Grabner Award TV Documentary	
2017	Djordje Čenić and Hermann Peseckas	Unten	Andreas Pfeifer and Andreas Novak	Menschen & Mächte – Flucht in die Freiheit
2018	Ruth Kaaserer	Gwendolyn	Fritz Ofner	Die Weltherrschaft
2019	Ruth Beckermann	The Waldheim Waltz	Karin Berghammer and Krisztina Kerekes	Leben für den Tod – Menschen am Zentralfriedhof

=== Thomas Pluch Screenwriting Prizes ===
Since the beginning of the Diagonale, the Thomas Pluch Screenwriting Prize ceremony has been held as part of the festival.

== Literature ==
- Christian Cargnelli: Auch ein Jammertal steht in einer Landschaft. Von den Österreichischen Filmtagen zur Diagonale: eine Chronik der Festivals des österreichischen Films. In: Meteor, Sondernummer "Österreichischer Film", March 1998.
- Christian Cargnelli: Jammertal Revisited. Eine Chronik der österreichischen Filmfestivals Diagonale von 1998 bis Anfang 2004. In: kolik.film, Sonderheft 1, March 2004.
- Michael Meisterhofer: . Diplomarbeit. Universität Wien, Wien 2015, 3. Filmfestival Diagonale, S. 14–34 (othes.univie.ac.at [PDF; 3,1 MB]).
