= Revanche (film) =

2008 film

- Theatrical release poster
- Directed by: Götz Spielmann
- Written by: Götz Spielmann
- Produced by: Heinz Stussak; Mathias Forberg; Götz Spielmann; Sandra Bohle
- Starring: Johannes Krisch; Ursula Strauss; Irina Potapenko; Andreas Lust; Hannes Thanheiser; Hanno Pöschl
- Cinematography: Martin Gschlacht
- Edited by: Karina Ressler
- Production companies: Prisma Films; Spielmann Film
- Distributed by: Filmladen
- Release dates: 10 February 2008 (Berlinale); 16 May 2008 (Austria)
- Running time: 122 minutes
- Country: Austria
- Languages: German; Russian
- Box office: $192,451 (US)

Revanche is a 2008 Austrian thriller film written and directed by Götz Spielmann. It centers on the ill-fated love story between a Viennese ex-con (Johannes Krisch) and a Ukrainian prostitute (Irina Potapenko) who get involved in a bank robbery.

The film had its world premiere at the Panorama section of the 58th Berlin International Film Festival in February 2008. It received critical acclaim and was nominated for Best Foreign Language Film at the 81st Academy Awards.

== Plot ==
Alex, an ex-convict living in Vienna and working as muscle at a brothel, starts a relationship with Tamara, a Ukrainian prostitute who works there. Alex plans to rob a bank in a small village, then hide out with his grandfather, Hausner, who lives there, before leaving with Tamara to start a new life together. He lets an anxious and clingy Tamara accompany him on the robbery. They have a run-in with a local policeman named Robert outside the bank, and Tamara is accidentally killed when Robert fires at their fleeing car. A despondent Alex escapes and hides out at Hausner's farm as planned.

Robert's marriage to his wife, Susanne, is strained, as she is apparently unable to conceive a child, and his repressed guilt over the shooting worsens this strain. They happen to be neighbors to Hausner, with whom Susanne is good friends, and she encounters Alex while visiting him. Alex learns Susanne's husband was the shooter and begins stalking Robert with a loaded gun. An oblivious Susanne propositions Alex during a visit to the farm, and the two commence an affair. Robert suffers a panic attack at work and is put on suspension, finally opening up to Susanne about his guilt over the shooting and general self-loathing.

Alex confronts Robert in the woods, questioning him about the shooting in veiled terms. Robert admits his regret but also chastises the robber (in the third person) for needlessly bringing Tamara along. After Robert leaves, Alex throws his gun in the pond. As Hausner's health deteriorates, Alex resolves to stay at the farm and look after it in his stead. Susanne successfully gets pregnant by Alex, passing it off as Robert's child. She visits Alex to cut off their affair and recognizes a photo of Tamara, realizing Alex was the robber. Alex agrees to keep their tryst a secret and expresses no further intention of harming Robert as he returns to work on the farm.

== Cast ==
- Johannes Krisch as Alex
- Irina Potapenko as Tamara
- Andreas Lust as Robert
- Ursula Strauss as Susanne
- Hannes Thanheiser as Hausner
- Hanno Pöschl as Konecny

== Production ==
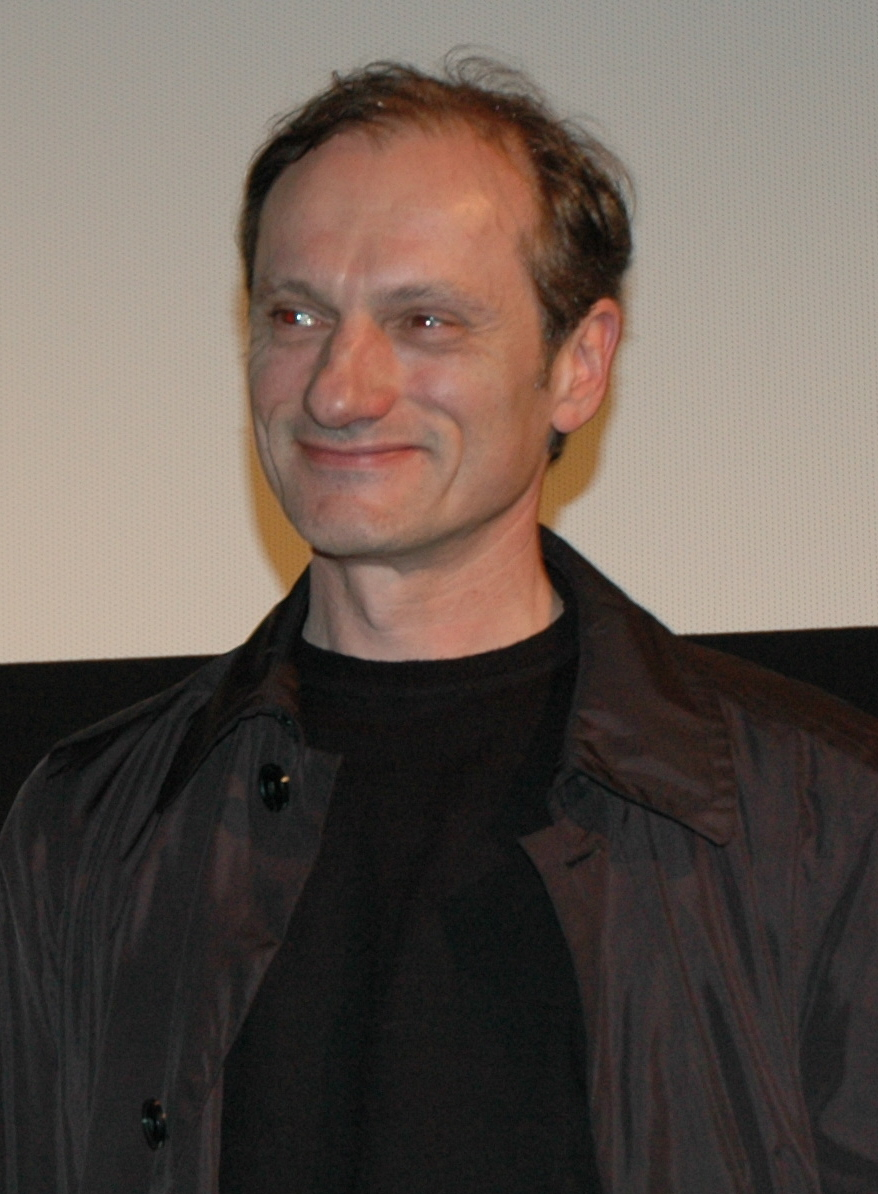
Götz Spielmann at the presentation of Revanche at the crossing Europe film festival in Linz, late April 2008

Production design was by Maria Gruber, who won the Femina Film Prize for it. Heinz Ebner was responsible for the sound. Film production was carried out entirely by the company Listo in Vienna.

Large parts of the film were shot in the area round Gföhl and Ottenschlag in the Waldviertel.

== Release ==
Film distribution in Austria is by Filmladen, while the world rights are held by The Match Factory, Cologne. The film was promoted by the Austrian Film Institute (Österreichisches Filminstitut) and the state of Lower Austria.

The film opened on 12 February 2009 in German cinemas and was subsequently released at different times in various European countries and the United States over the following months.

=== Awards submission ===
The film was submitted on 1 September 2008 by the Austrian Film Commission as the Austrian entry for selection for the Oscars in the Best Foreign-Language Film category, and on 22 January 2009 was nominated by the Academy of Motion Picture Arts and Sciences out of 67 entries as one of five films. This was the third time that Austria had submitted a film by Spielmann: the first two were The Stranger (Die Fremde) (2000) and Antares (2004). Director Götz Spielmann did not appear especially surprised at the film being short-listed, as it was "already obvious" that "'Revanche' will be unusually well received in the USA". He did not think an actual nomination impossible, but it would be a close-run thing.

=== Critical reception ===
Following the world premiere at the Berlin International Film Festival 2008 the film had excellent reviews around the world and received several awards. Variety's Alissa Simon noted:

"Elegantly spinning primal elements of guilt, revenge, faith and redemption, helmer's gripping fifth feature is prime fest material that's likely to rate Euro arthouse exposure, with further viewers in ancillary. (...) Stillness and sounds of nature play a key role in creating pic's intense atmosphere. (...) Asking the question, "Whose fault is it if life doesn't go your way?," the cleverly constructed script introduces some fresh and surprising twists and turns. (...) Impressive lensing from Martin Gschlacht, the key cinematographer for Austria's young helmers, provides simplicity and clarity, while concise cutting by Karina Ressler allows no gratuitous moments in a pic that clocks in at just over two hours. With Revanche his strongest work yet, Spielmann creates high expectations for the future."

Revanche has an approval rating of 96% on review aggregator website Rotten Tomatoes, based on 83 reviews, and an average rating of 7.89/10. The website's critical consensus states, "With Revanche, Götz Spielmann has crafted a debut as surprising as it is suspenseful". It also has a score of 84 out of 100 on Metacritic, based on 22 critics, indicating "universal acclaim".

Revanche was placed at 90 on Slant Magazine's best films of the 2000s.

=== Awards ===
In January 2009, it was announced that Revanche was nominated for the Academy Award for Best Foreign Language Film.

- Berlin International Film Festival 2008
  - European Cinemas Label as Best European Film of the Panorama section
  - Art-Cinéma-Award 2008 of the CICAE (Confédération Internationale des Cinémas D´Art et Essai)
  - Femina film award of the Verband der Filmarbeiterinnen to Maria Gruber for the production design
- Diagonale 2008:
  - Grand Award as Best Austrian feature film
  - Spezial Award of the Jury for actress Ursula Strauss
  - Diagonale-Prize of the Association of Austrian Cinematographers to Martin Gschlacht for best cinematography in a feature film
- Tromsø International Film Festival 2008 (Norway):
  - FIPRESCI Award
  - First Prize Aurora
- Palm Springs International Film Festival 2008: FIPRESCI-Award as Best Foreign Language Film of the Year

Awards from smaller film festivals: at the Filmkunstfest 2008 in Mecklenburg-Vorpommern (Fliegender Ochse as best feature film), at the Monterrey International Film Festival 2008 (Best Screenplay and Audience Award), at the Fünf Seen Filmfestival in Starnberg (First Prize Star 2008), and at the International Filmfestival Motovun (From A to A-Award).
