= Kusturica =

Kusturica is a surname. Notable people with this surname include:

- Edis Kusturica (born 1953), Bosnian entrepreneur, lawyer and former 37th president of the assembly of FK Sarajevo
- Emir Kusturica (born 1954), Serbian filmmaker, actor and musician
- Nikola Kusturica (born 2009), Serbian basketball player
- Nina Kusturica (born 1975), Bosnian-Herzegovinian-born, Austrian film director, film editor and film producer
