= Hotel (2004 film) =

2004 film

- Theatrical poster
- Directed by: Jessica Hausner
- Written by: Jessica Hausner
- Produced by: Bruno Wagner
- Starring: Franziska Weisz; Birgit Minichmayr; Marlene Streeruwitz
- Cinematography: Martin Gschlacht
- Edited by: Karina Ressler
- Production company: Coop99 Filmproduktion
- Distributed by: Neue Visionen Filmverleih
- Release dates: 17 May 2004 (Cannes); 1 April 2005 (Austria)
- Running time: 76 minutes
- Country: Austria
- Language: German

Hotel is a 2004 Austrian psychological horror film written and directed by Jessica Hausner and starring Franziska Weisz, Birgit Minichmayr, and Marlene Streeruwitz. Its plot follows a young woman who takes a job as a receptionist at a rural Alpine hotel, where the employee she replaced disappeared under unclear circumstances. It was screened in the Un Certain Regard section at the 2004 Cannes Film Festival.

== Plot ==
Irene takes a job working as a receptionist at the front desk of Waldhaus, a hotel in the Austrian Alps. As she is not a local, Irene is given room and board on the premises as part of her compensation. On her first day, Irene is shown her main duties, which include checking the hotel's basement storage and ensuring that the basement access door is locked each night. Irene's co-worker, Petra, informs her that the previous receptionist, Eva, disappeared under unclear circumstances, though Petra believes Eva simply ran off with a boyfriend.

Irene begins to date Erik, a local artist, who shows her a cave in the forest where the Lady of the Woods, a witch lynched in the 16th century, is said to reside, and which has become a local tourist attraction. According to folklore, a group of hikers disappeared near the cave in 1962. Irene is skeptical of the story. When her cherished diamond cross necklace goes missing, Irene informs her boss, Mrs. Maschek, that she believes a co-worker—possibly Petra—may have stolen it. A staff meeting is held about the incident, leading Irene to become a pariah, though her necklace is eventually returned.

After bringing Erik to the hotel one night, Irene is reprimanded by Mrs. Maschek as having guests violates her employee guidelines. While apologizing to Mrs. Liebig, an older woman who has lived and worked at the Waldhaus with her husband for many years, Irene inquires about what happened to Eva. Mrs. Liebig calmly tells Irene to leave the hotel before she begins praying the Rosary.

Unnerved, Irene requests the weekend off, which Mrs. Maschek reluctantly approves. Irene asks Petra to cover her shift, which she agrees to, under the provision that Irene allow her to borrow her cross necklace that weekend. Desperate to leave the hotel and see her parents, Irene allows Petra to have the necklace. The night she is scheduled to board a train home, Irene begins completing the final duties of the night shift, which include checking the basement. While checking on the basement access door, she inadvertently locks herself outside. After some hesitation, Irene wanders into the woods, where her screams are heard moments later.

== Cast ==
- Franziska Weisz as Irene
- Birgit Minichmayr as Petra
- Marlene Streeruwitz as Mrs. Maschek
- Peter Strauß as Mr. Kross
- Regina Fritsch as Mrs. Karin
- Rosa Waissnix as Mrs. Liebig
- Alfred Worel as Mr. Liebig
- Christopher Schärf as Erik

== Production ==
The film was shot on location at a hotel in Gösing, Austria in the fall of 2003. The reception desk featured in the film was shot at a hotel in Reichenau an der Rax, with additional photography occurring at the Parkhotel Schönbrunn in Vienna. Hausner was inspired by the Maya Deren film Meshes in the Afternoon when conceiving the dream sequences featured in the film.

== Release ==
=== Critical response ===
Hotel received mixed reviews from film critics, largely due to its ambiguous ending. Hausner commented on the reaction to the film: "Hotel is my most problematic film, in a way, because the reaction of the audience was quite controversial. Some people like the film, but a lot of people said the ending was missing; they couldn’t enjoy the fact that you cannot get any plausible explanations for what was happening. And I remember that back then I thought that was good and that was the only reason to make the film, to not give you any clue what it was about. But then with all the discussions with audiences after screenings, I more and more understood how little an audience is willing to take that."

=== Home media ===
Film Movement acquired distribution rights to Hotel, and performed a new 4K restoration of the film, releasing it in a special edition Blu-ray disc made available in September 2024 with an exclusive slipcover. The Blu-ray is scheduled for a wide release on 29 October 2024.
