= European Film Promotion =

International film promotion organization

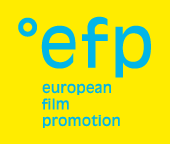
- Abbreviation: EFP
- Formation: 1997
- Location: Hamburg, Germany
- Managing Director: Sonja Heinen
- Website: www.efp-online.com

European Film Promotion (EFP) is an organisation with a mission of promoting European films internationally. A network of 38 national film promotion institutes which represent films from their respective territories. Under the EFP flag, the members team up on initiatives to promote the diversity and the spirit of European cinema and talent at key international film festivals and markets.

== Activities ==
EFP's joint promotional strategies including artistic and business-oriented platforms with a focus on three main areas: promotion of films and talent, access to international markets, and film sales support outside of Europe.

EFP has developed innovative programmes and initiatives such as the well-known programmes European Shooting Stars, introducing young talented actors to the press, industry and public at the Berlin International Film Festival, and Producers on the Move, a networking event at the Cannes Film Festival to promote and link up aspiring young producers. Further programmes concentrate on films by female directors (Europe! Voices of Women in Film at Sidney Film Festival) and young talented directors (Future Frames at the Karlovy Vary International Film Festival) or focus on outstanding documentary productions from Europe (The Changing Face of Europe at the Hot Docs Canadian International Documentary Festival, Toronto).

EFP organises and operates Europe! Umbrellas to establish a joint European presence and visibility in key international markets outside of Europe, and it also backs marketing campaigns for European films to countries outside of Europe via Film Sales Support.

== National Film Promotion Institutes ==
The following 38 organisations from 37 European countries are members of EFP:

- Albanian National Center of Cinematography (Albania)
- Association of Filmmakers of Bosnia & Herzegovina
- Austrian Films (Austria)
- British Council (United Kingdom)
- Bulgarian National Film Center (Bulgaria)
- National Centre for Cinema and the Moving Image (France)
- Croatian Audiovisual Centre (Croatia)
- Cultural Services of the Ministry of Education and Culture of Cyprus
- Czech Film Center (Czech Republic)
- Danish Film Institute (Denmark)
- Estonian Film Institute (Estonia)
- EYE International (The Netherlands)·
- Film Center Serbia (Serbia)
- Film Fund Luxembourg (Luxembourg)
- Film Centre of Montenegro
- Finnish Film Foundation (Finland)
- Flanders Image (Dutch-speaking Belgium)
- Georgian National Film Center (Georgia)
- German Films (Germany)
- Greek Film Centre (Greece)
- Hungarian National Film Fund (Hungary)
- Icelandic Film Centre (Iceland)
- Instituto de la Cinematografía y de las Artes Audiovisuales / ICAA (Spain)
- Instituto do Cinema e do Audiovisual I.P. / ICA (Portugal)
- Istituto Luce Cinecittà (Italy)
- Kosova Cinematography Center (Republic of Kosovo)
- Lithuanian Film Centre (Lithuania)
- Macedonian Film Agency (Macedonia)
- National Film Centre of Latvia (Latvia)
- Norwegian Film Institute (Norway)
- Polish Film Institute (Poland)
- Romanian Film Promotion (Romania)
- Fís Éireann/Screen Ireland (Ireland)
- Slovak Film Institute (Slovakia)
- Slovenian Film Center (Slovenia)
- Swedish Film Institute (Sweden)
- Swiss Films (Switzerland)
- UniFrance (France)
- Wallonie Bruxelles Images (French-speaking Belgium)

== History ==
Its predecessor was the European distribution organisation European Film Distribution Office (EFDO) which had been established by Dieter Kosslick and others in Hamburg in 1988 as a pilot project of the European MEDIA I funding programme. The concept of a network was taken up and further developed by the initial ten members of the European Film Promotion association when it was founded in 1997. The network's President is Martin Martin Schweighofer (Austrian Film Commission) and Sonja Heinen took over the responsibility for its management from her predecessor and EFP co-founder Renate Rose in 2017.

== Partners ==
EFP is financially supported by the Creative Europe – MEDIA Programme of the European Union and by its member organisations. The Hamburg-based office is backed by the German Federal Government Commissioner for Culture and the Media, the Film Fund Hamburg Schleswig-Holstein, and the Ministry of Culture of the City of Hamburg.

== Awards ==
=== Arab Critics' Awards for European Films ===
In 2019, EFP launched the Arab Critics' Awards for European Films in tandem with the Arab Cinema Center (ACC) and with the support of Creative Europe MEDIA. Picked up by Arab critics from a shortlist of films selected from a pool of submissions, the winner is announced at the El Gouna Film Festival.

Winners include God Exists, Her Name Is Petrunya (2019), Undine (2020), 107 Mothers (2021), EO (2022), Fallen Leaves (2023), and The Seed of the Sacred Fig (2024).

=== Latin American Critics' Award for European Films ===
In 2024, EFP established the Latin American Critics' Award for European Films. Held in cooperation with the Guadalajara International Film Festival and featuring the support of Creative Europe MEDIA, it is bestowed by a jury of Latin American members to a film out of three finalists, which are in turn selected from a set of films submitted by national film academies or committees from European countries.

Winners include The Teachers' Lounge (2024) and Deaf (2025).
