= October November =

2013 film

- Directed by: Götz Spielmann
- Written by: Götz Spielmann
- Produced by: Martin Gschlacht, Antonin Svoboda, Bruno Wagner, Götz Spielmann
- Starring: Nora von Waldstätten; Ursula Strauss; Sebastian Koch
- Cinematography: Martin Gschlacht
- Edited by: Karina Ressler
- Release date: 8 September 2013 (TIFF)
- Running time: 114 minutes
- Country: Austria
- Language: German

October November (German: Oktober November) is a 2013 Austrian drama film written and directed by Götz Spielmann. It was screened in the Contemporary World Cinema section at the 2013 Toronto International Film Festival.

== Cast ==
- Nora von Waldstätten as Sonja
- Ursula Strauss as Verena
- Peter Simonischek as Father
- Sebastian Koch as Andreas
- Johannes Zeiler as Michael
- Andreas Ressl as Hannes
