= The Trouble with Being Born (film) =

2020 film by Sandra Wollner

- Promotional release poster
- Directed by: Sandra Wollner
- Written by: Roderick Warich; Sandra Wollner
- Produced by: Lixi Frank; David Bohun; Andi G. Hess; Astrid Schäfer; Viktoria Stolpe; Timm Kröger
- Starring: Dominik Warta; Lena Watson
- Cinematography: Timm Kröger
- Edited by: Hannes Bruun
- Music by: Peter Kutin; David Schweighart
- Production companies: Panama Film; The Barricades; ZDF / Das kleine Fernsehspiel; Filmakademie Baden-Württemberg
- Distributed by: filmdelights (Austria); Eksystent Distribution (Germany)
- Release dates: 25 February 2020 (Berlinale); 18 June 2021 (Austria); 1 July 2021 (Germany)
- Running time: 94 minutes
- Countries: Austria; Germany
- Language: German

The Trouble with Being Born is a 2020 science fiction drama film directed and co-written by Sandra Wollner. An Austrian-German co-production, the film follows Elli (Lena Watson), an android made to resemble the missing daughter of Georg (Dominik Warta), the man with whom she lives.

At its premiere at the 70th Berlin International Film Festival, the film attracted controversy over its depiction of an implied sexual relationship between Georg and Elli, a childlike android made to resemble his missing daughter.

== Plot ==
Elli is a humanoid android resembling a ten-year-old girl who lives with a man named Georg in an isolated house surrounded by woodland. She calls him "Papa" and has been programmed with memories of Georg's daughter, who disappeared ten years earlier. Georg treats Elli as a replacement for his missing daughter, spending their days swimming in the pool, taking photographs and reminiscing about supposed shared experiences. Their relationship is also implied to be sexual.

Although Elli can recount childhood memories, these recollections have been programmed into her by Georg rather than personally experienced. Her artificial nature becomes apparent when Georg discovers her lying motionless in the swimming pool and subsequently reactivates her. Similar incidents suggest that she has repeatedly attempted to shut herself down, with Georg restoring her functionality each time.

One night, Elli leaves the house and wanders into the surrounding forest. After becoming lost, she reaches a road, where she is discovered by a passing motorist named Toni. Recognising that she is an android, Toni takes her to his elderly mother, Anna Schikowa. Initially uncomfortable with Elli's presence, Anna begins recounting memories of her childhood and her younger brother Emil, who died approximately sixty years earlier.

Toni subsequently modifies Elli's appearance, changing her facial features, hair and voice to resemble Emil as a young boy. The android is also supplied with memories associated with Anna's deceased brother. Anna becomes increasingly attached to Emil, treating the android as though her brother has returned.

Through their conversations, it emerges that the original Emil died following an argument with Anna during their childhood. The siblings had physically fought, and Emil ran away before being struck by a train.

Despite the modifications, Elli's previous memories have not been completely erased. Recollections of Georg and her earlier existence begin to intrude upon Emil's new identity. A television news report concerning a missing girl further disrupts the android's behaviour. Emil begins recalling Georg, their time together and the swimming pool, while simultaneously repeating memories belonging to Anna's brother. The two identities become increasingly confused.

The android's behaviour eventually deteriorates, and the circumstances surrounding the original Emil's death begin to repeat themselves. During a confrontation, Anna falls and sustains an injury. Unable to get up, she remains on the floor while Emil watches without assisting her. Her dog approaches and drinks the blood from her wound. Anna subsequently dies.

After leaving the house, Emil wanders away with the dog. The android's fragmented recollections continue, combining memories of Georg with those of the deceased Emil. Eventually, Emil reaches a railway line and steps into the path of an approaching train, which strikes and destroys the android, recreating the circumstances of the original Emil's death.

The film also returns to images of Georg searching for the missing Elli. The non-linear arrangement of the final sequences leaves their precise chronology ambiguous.

== Cast ==
- Lena Watson as Elli/Emil, an android
- Dominik Warta as Georg
- Ingrid Burkhard as Ms. Schikowa
- Jana McKinnon as Elli, Georg's human daughter
- Simon Hatzl as Toni

== Production ==
Director and co-writer Sandra Wollner has referred to the film as the "antithesis to Pinocchio". Wollner initially intended to cast a 20-year-old actress in the role of the android Elli, but after removing some of the more explicit elements from the film's script, instead chose 10-year-old actress Lena Watson, a stage name inspired by Emma Watson, for the role. The scenes in which the android is shown nude were accomplished using computer-generated imagery. Watson also wore a silicone mask and wig, which served to conceal her identity and enable her to resemble another actress who appears later in the film.

== Release and reception ==
The Trouble with Being Born had its world premiere at the 70th Berlin International Film Festival on 25 February 2020, as part of the festival's Encounters section. It was reported that several audience members walked out during the premiere. The film received the Special Jury Award in the Encounters section.

The film was released theatrically in Austria by filmdelights on 18 June 2021, followed by a German theatrical release through Eksystent Distribution on 1 July 2021.

Jonathan Romney of Screen Daily called the film "a powerful and revelatory achievement [...] complex, artfully crafted, sometimes wilfully perplexing". Jessica Kiang of Variety called it a "desperately creepy, queasy, thought-provoking film", and concluded: "Wollner's lacerating intelligence and riveting craft make this extraordinarily effed-up riff on the 'Pinocchio' legend [...] much more than empty provocation". Chris Barsanti of Slant Magazine gave the film a rating of two out of four stars, and wrote that the film "suffers from the same issue as its moody androids: enervation borne out of repetition."

The Melbourne International Film Festival decided not to screen the film at its 2020 festival, citing concerns raised by two forensic psychologists that it might "[normalise] sexual interest in children" and be "used as a source of arousal for men interested in child abuse material". The decision to remove the film from the festival line-up was criticized by film critics Peter Krausz, Tom Ryan and David Stratton.

Amid controversy in Australia, Sandra Hall of The Sydney Morning Herald described the film as "strangely moral".

== Awards and accolades ==
- 70th Berlin International Film Festival: Special Jury Award (Encounters)
- 2020 Diagonale: Grand Diagonale Prize for Best Feature Film; Best Editing for Hannes Bruun; Best Sound Design for Peter Kutin; Acting Award for Dominik Warta; Thomas Pluch Special Jury Prize for Sandra Wollner
- 2020 First Steps Award: Best Feature-Length Film for Sandra Wollner
- 2020 Vienna International Film Festival: Special Jury Prize
- 2021 Austrian Film Award: Best Feature Film; Best Director for Sandra Wollner; Best Makeup for Gaby Grünwald; Best Sound Design for Johannes Schmelzer-Ziringer, Peter Kutin and Simon Peter
