= Tag und Nacht (film) =

- Film poster
- Directed by: Sabine Derflinger
- Release date: October 2010
- Country: Austria
- Language: German

Tag und Nacht (lit. 'Day and night') is a 2010 Austrian film directed by Sabine Derflinger. The film won Best Costume at Diagonale 2011, Best Lead Actor for Anna Rot at the New York International Film Festival in 2011, and the best narrative at the Geneva Film Festival in 2012. The film concerns two Austrian women, played by Anna Rot and Magdalena Kronschläger, who consider prostitution an adventure until harsh reality intervenes.
