= Nina Kusturica =

Bosnian-born Austrian film director

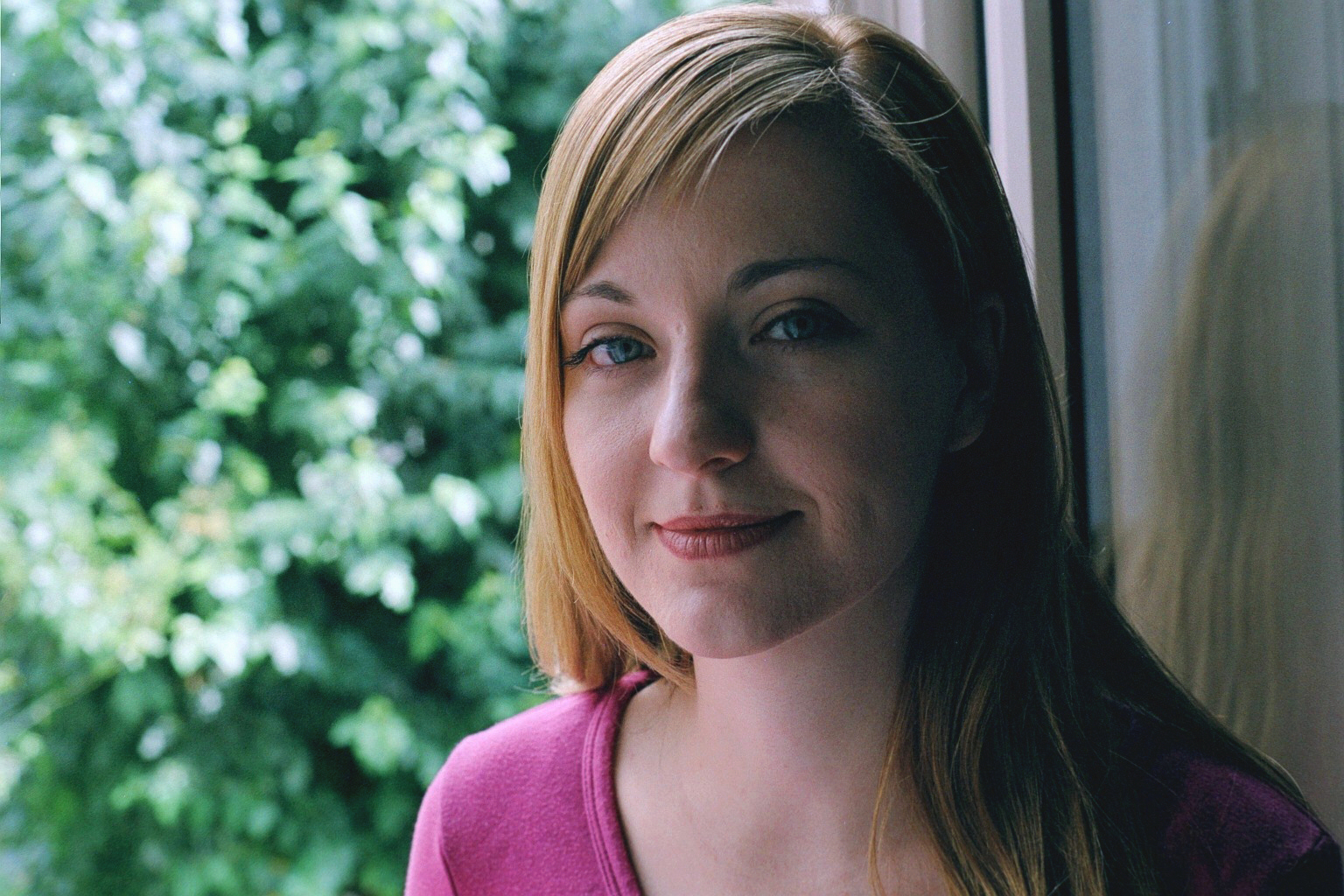
- Born: 1975 (age 50–51); Mostar, SR Bosnia and Herzegovina, SFR Yugoslavia
- Occupation: Film director
- Years active: 1997-present
- Website: http://www.littlealien.at/en_regie01.html

Nina Kusturica is a Bosnian-born Austrian film director, film editor and film producer.

== Biography ==
She studied at the University of Music and Performing Arts, Vienna to become a film director and editor and earned her degree with the film Auswege, which had its premiere at the Berlin International Film Festival in the International Forum of New Cinema. It also opened the Diagonale – the Festival of Austrian Film – in 2003. In the same year, Nina Kusturica and Eva Testor founded the production company Mobilefilm in Vienna.

In 2009, Nina Kusturica's documentary Little Alien had its premiere – once again at the Diagonale. The documentary about unaccompanied minor refugees also went on tour to reach Austrian pupils and students with a special concept consisting of the projection of the film followed by a discussion with the director and/or protagonists. In 2010, Nina Kusturica was awarded the outstanding artist award in the category of 'Intercultural Dialogue' by the Federal Ministry for Education, Arts and Culture for her special commitment.

Kusturic is involved in the Austrian citizens' initiative Machen wir uns STARK which demands a change in current politics, above all concerning integration and education.

== Filmography ==
director, producer, editor (selection)

- 1998 Ich bin der neue Star, documentary, 15 min., director, script
- 1999 Wishes, short film, 20 min., director, script
- 2000 Draga Ljiljana - Dear Ljiliana, documentary, 31 min., director, script
- 2001 Der Freiheit, short film, 14 min., director, script
- 2003 Auswege, feature film, 90 min., director, script
- 2004 24 Realities per Second, a documentary on Michael Haneke, 58 min., director, editing, production
- 2009 Little Alien, documentary, 94 min., director, script, editing

producer/editor (selection)

- 1997 Speak Easy, short film, editing
- 1999 Lesen macht tot, feature film, editing
- 2002 Laut und deutlich, documentary, editing
- 2005 Kotsch, feature film, editing
- 2007 Auf dem Strich - Paul Flora in Film documentary, production
- 2007 Vienna's Lost Daughters, feature documentary, production, editing

== Awards ==
- 2006 Diagonale, Best Editing Feature Film together with Bernhard Schmid for Kotsch
- 2010 outstanding artist award, category: intercultural dialogue, of the Federal Ministry for Education, Arts and Culture, 2010
- 2010 Feature Documentary – 2nd place, Editing – 1st place for Little Alien, International Filmfestival Los Angeles, 2010
