= Elfie Semotan =

Austrian fashion photographer (1941–2026)

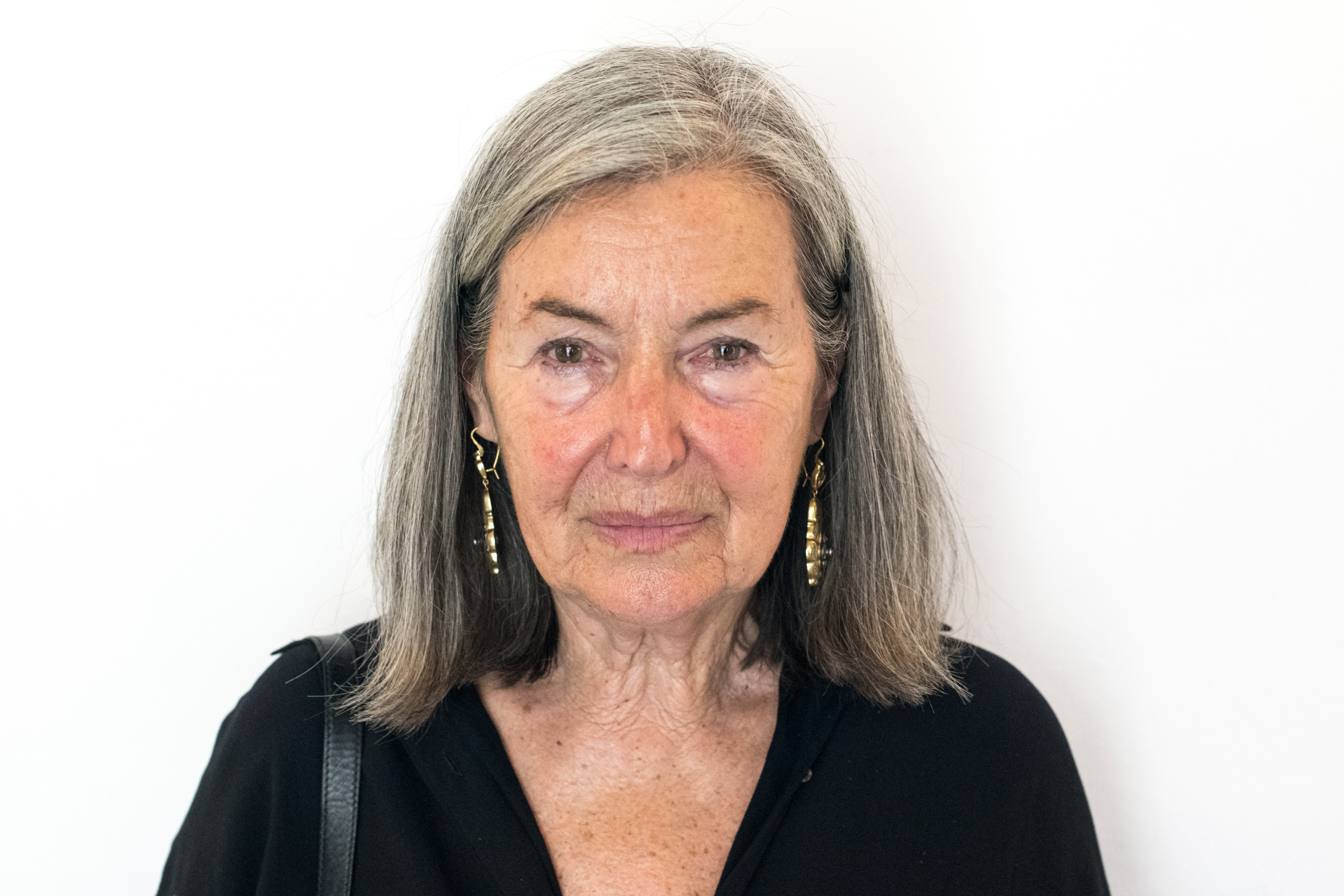
- Semotan in 2019
- Born: 25 July 1941; Wels, Reichsgau Oberdonau, Germany
- Died: 6 June 2026 (aged 84); Jennersdorf, Burgenland, Austria
- Education: Vienna Fashion School
- Occupation: Fashion photographer

Elfie Semotan (25 July 1941 – 6 June 2026) was an Austrian fashion photographer. She was a recipient of the Austrian Decoration for Science and Art (2011).

Semotan died in Jennersdorf on 6 June 2026, at the age of 84.
