= Antares (film) =

2004 film

- Directed by: Götz Spielmann
- Written by: Götz Spielmann
- Produced by: Wulf Flemming; Erich Lackner
- Starring: Petra Morzé; Andreas Patton; Hary Prinz; Susanne Wuest
- Cinematography: Martin Gschlacht
- Edited by: Karina Ressler
- Music by: Walter W. Cikan; Marnix Veenenbos
- Release date: 5 August 2004 (Locarno Film Festival)
- Running time: 105 minutes
- Country: Austria
- Languages: German; Croatian; English

Antares is a 2004 Austrian film directed by Götz Spielmann. It was Austria's submission to the 77th Academy Awards for the Academy Award for Best Foreign Language Film, but was not accepted as a nominee. The movie is a sexual drama that focuses on adultery, abusive relationships, and sexual frustration. Critics claim that the film also explores the relationship between Austria and its former empire through immigration.

== Synopsis ==
A car accident connects the lives of a nurse (Petra Morzé), a supermarket checkout girl (Susanne Wuest), and a real-estate agent (Andreas Kiendl), all involved in complex and dysfunctional relationships.

== Production ==
Asked about the explicit sex scenes between Petra Morzé and Andreas Patton, director Götz Spielmann said, "I told them I wanted them to go as far as possible, without taboos. We'd find out how far that was when we got there. Then for two days we talked through the scenes point by point, in complete detail and without inhibitions, discussed every second of these scenes - completely and candidly. What does the character feel, what gets him/her excited, why? What kind of power relationships are at work? At what point do they change? And so on... What turned out well - and this is what is often the problem in sex scenes - is that the actors were always aware that they were characters, that they were playing the story and sexuality of characters. That gives you protection, lets you take greater risks. Because of this, the shoots were very exciting and sometimes really moving."

== Reception ==
Antares was poorly received by those few critics who saw it. On Rotten Tomatoes it has an approval rating of 0% based on reviews from 5 critics.

== See also ==
- Cinema of Austria
- List of submissions to the 77th Academy Awards for Best Foreign Language Film
- List of films with a 0% rating on Rotten Tomatoes
