= Austrian Films =

NGO supporting Austrian film industry

Logo of the Austrian Film Commission

Austrian Films (formerly known as Austrian Film Commission), founded in 1987, is an organisation dedicated to promoting Austrian cinema throughout the world.

== Activities ==
Austrian Films's role is to increase awareness of Austrian film making abroad and to support the positioning and release of Austrian films on the international marketplace.

Acting both as an information clearing house and as a facilitating agency for export purposes, the organisation maintains ongoing contacts with festival directors, sales agents, buyers and distributors, as well as the press, concerning new Austrian productions. Offering a wide variety of services at the domestic and international level, Austrian Films consults with producers and creative artists attending international festivals and markets and supports their activities.

Austrian Films represents Austria in the network of European film organisations for the worldwide advertisement of European film, the European Film Promotion.

The organisation represents the Austrian film industry at all important international festivals and markets.

Until 2021, Austrian Films produced publications such as Austrian Films, the Austrian Film Guide and Austrian Film News.

The Austrian Films website provides news on current Austrian filmmaking and interviews, a film database, addresses and data on the Austrian film industry and a comprehensive list of the festival participations of Austrian films since 2002.

The first Diagonale film festivals in Salzburg (1993 to 1995) were organised by the Austrian Film Commission.

From 1992 until 2021, Martin Schweighofer was the director of the organisation. Since 2021, Anne Laurent-Delage holds this position.

== See also ==
- Location Austria – agency for promoting Austria as an international film location

== Sources and external links ==
- Austrian Films official website
- European Film Promotion
