= Michael (2011 Austrian film) =

2011 film

- Austria release poster
- Directed by: Markus Schleinzer
- Written by: Markus Schleinzer
- Produced by: Nikolaus Geyrhalter; Markus Glaser; Wolfgang Widerhofer
- Starring: Michael Fuith; David Rauchenberger
- Cinematography: Gerald Kerkletz
- Edited by: Wolfgang Widerhofer
- Music by: Lorenz Dangel
- Production companies: Cine Tirol; Filmfonds Wien; Filmstandort Austria (FISA); Nikolaus Geyrhalter Filmproduktion; ORF Film/Fernseh-Abkommen; Österreichisches Filminstitut
- Distributed by: Stadtkino Filmverleih
- Release dates: 14 May 2011 (Cannes); 2 September 2011 (Austria)
- Running time: 94 minutes
- Country: Austria
- Language: German

Michael is a 2011 Austrian drama film written and directed by Markus Schleinzer, in his directorial debut. Loosely based on the Natascha Kampusch case, it follows the offender's viewpoint. Starring Michael Fuith, as the film's title character, and David Rauchenberger as the abducted child.

The film had its world premiere in the main competition of the 2011 Cannes Film Festival. It was theatrically released in Austria on 2 September 2011 by Stadtkino Filmverleih.

== Plot ==
Michael is an insurance broker who lives a quiet, unassuming existence — and who secretly keeps a 10-year-old boy called Wolfgang in his soundproof basement. He sexually abuses the boy, but otherwise exist in a "peaceful" coexistence mirroring a perverted father–son relationship. In the evenings, after Michael locks the door and closes the blinds, Wolfgang is allowed into the living room for dinner and to watch TV. When in hospital after an accident, Michael is in a hurry to be released and return to Wolfgang. When Wolfgang gets sick Michael digs a grave in the woods, in case Wolfgang dies. However, he recovers. The boy writes a letter to his parents, to be mailed by Michael, but Michael does not send it and lies to Wolfgang, saying his parents do not want him back.

Sometimes, he takes the boy on a pleasure trip outside the town, where people do not know Michael. On one occasion, he goes on a skiing trip with friends for multiple days, leaving extra food for Wolfgang, who has water, a toilet, simple cooking facilities and a TV in his room.

Seeing that Wolfgang is lonely, Michael promises to bring another child for company. Together they assemble a bunk bed in advance. Michael attempts to abduct another boy by luring him away, but the boy is called back by his father, who scolds him for walking off with a stranger. Michael tells Wolfgang that he did not succeed in providing him a friend. One day, after watching a film in which a serial killer asks his victim if she would rather be stabbed by his knife or his penis, Michael decides to ask Wolfgang the same question, purely because he finds it funny and assumes that Wolfgang will laugh. However, when he asks Wolfgang at dinnertime, he immediately responds with "the knife," making Michael uncomfortable by forcing him to recognize that Wolfgang hates him. Eventually, Wolfgang attempts to escape by throwing boiling water into Michael's face, nearly blinding him, but does not succeed in escaping. Due to the burns inflicted upon him in the attack, Michael takes his car and attempts to seek medical attention but dies when he crashes his car enroute to the hospital. After the funeral, Michael's mother is about to discover Wolfgang when the film ends.

== Cast ==
- Michael Fuith as Michael
- David Rauchenberger as Wolfgang
- Christine Kain as Mother
- Ursula Strauss as Sister
- Victor Tremmel as Brother-in-law

== Production ==
The film contains a scene in which Michael exposes his penis to Wolfgang. Schleinzer used an invisible split screen to ensure Rauchenberger did not have to participate in the scene.

== Reception ==
The film was met with mixed critic ratings at the Cannes Film Festival. While Indiewire's Eric Kohn called the film "a triumph of uneasy cinema: Not since Todd Solondz's Happiness has a movie portrayed pedophilia in such uncomfortable detail", Esquire's Mike D'Angelo tweeted "WHAT THE FUCK IS WRONG WITH EVERYONE IN AUSTRIA. SERIOUSLY. Once again, very well made in the approved festival style, but I understand now exactly how detractors of Funny Games felt". In Télérama, Aurélien Ferenczi wrote: "a (apparent) objectivity, the refusal of emotion, a willingness to show horror as something ordinary. We can admire the mastery, praise the coherence of the subject, or find that this mannerism is almost dated".
