= Marlene Streeruwitz =

Austrian playwright and author

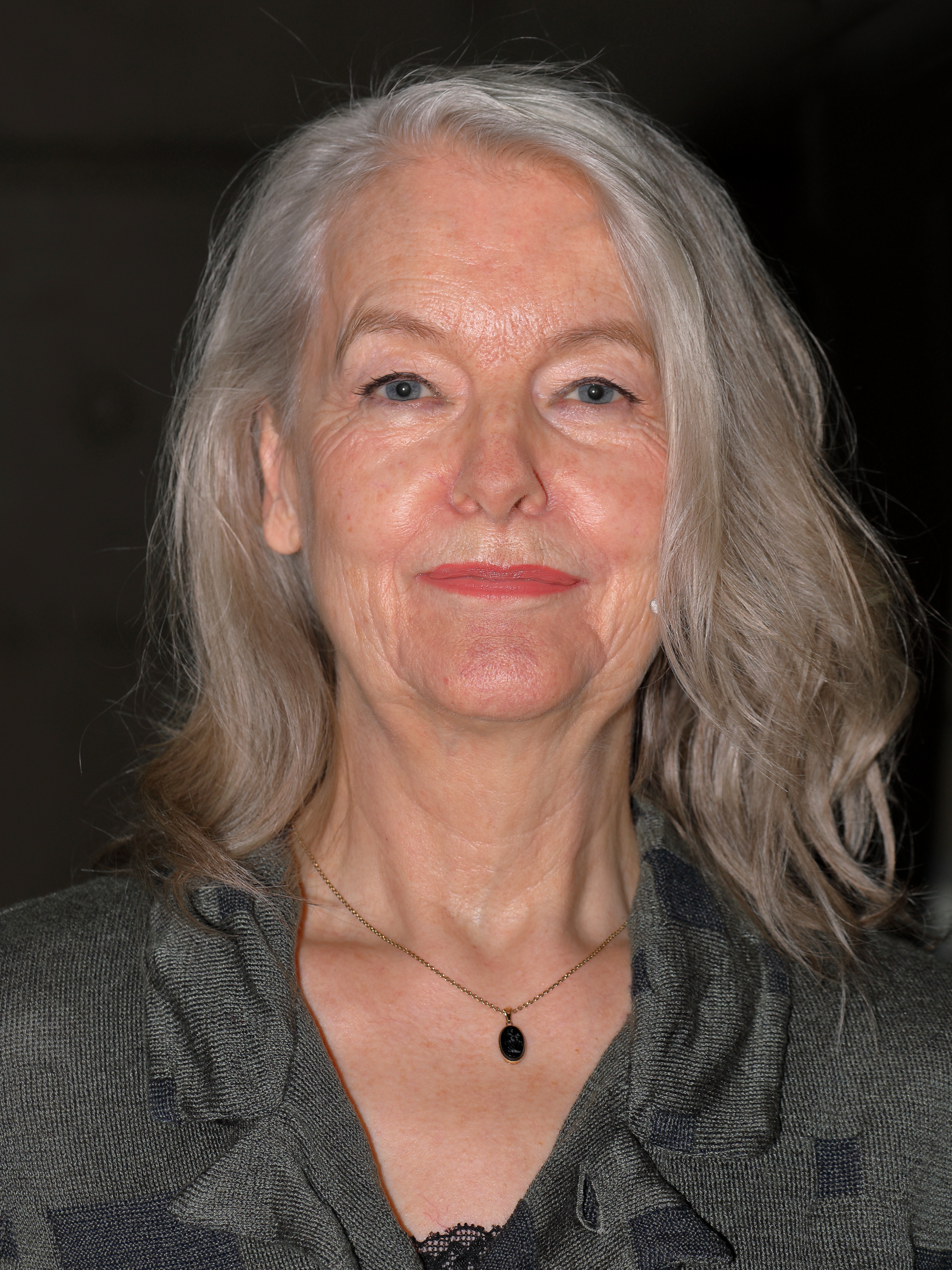
Streeruwitz at Buch Wien in 2024

Marlene Streeruwitz (born 28 June 1950) is an Austrian playwright, novelist, poet, and short story writer.

== Biography ==
Born in Baden bei Wien in 1950, Streeruwitz was raised in a well-to-do family. Her father was a politician and later became mayor. She studied law and Slavic languages at Vienna University but interrupted her studies to get married and raise a family. Her divorce triggered her interest in writing, although she did not think of publishing anything for the next 14 years. She gained fame first as the author of the radio play Kaiserklamm.Und.Kirchenwirt (1989) and even more so when Waikiki-Beach and Sloane Square proved extremely successful when staged in Cologne.

Streeruwitz has also become known as a poet, reading her own works such as Sein. Und Schein. Und Erscheinen (1997) and Können. Mögen. Dürfen. Sollen. Wollen. Müssen. Lassen (1998) in Tübingen and Frankfurt.

== Awards ==
Streeruwitz has received many awards for her work including the Hermann-Hesse-Preis (2001), Literaturpreis der Stadt Wien (Literature Prize from the City of Vienna, 2001), and the Droste-Preis (2009).

=== Memberships ===
- 2026 Member of the Academy of Arts, Berlin

== Selected works ==
- New York. New York. Elysian Park, two plays, Suhrkamp, Frankfurt am Main 1993, ISBN 3-518-11800-5.
- Verführungen. 3. Folge. Frauenjahre, 1996.
- Sein. Und Schein. Und Erscheinen, poetry, Tübinger Poetikvorlesungen, 1997.
- Können. Mögen. Dürfen. Sollen. Wollen. Müssen. Lassen, poetry, Frankfurter Poetikvorlesungen, 1998.
- Lisa's Liebe, novel in three parts, 1997.
- Nachwelt, novel, 1999.
- Waikiki Beach. Und andere Orte, play, Die Theaterstücke, 1999.
- Majakowskiring, short story, 2000.
- Norma Desmond. A Gothic SF-Novel 2002.
- Partygirl, novel, 2002.
- Jessica, 30, novel, 2004.
- Morire in Levitate, short story, 2004.
- Gegen die tägliche Beleidigung. Vorlesungen. 2004.
- Entfernung, novel, 2006, ISBN 3-10-074432-2.
- Der Abend nach dem Begräbnis der besten Freundin, Weissbooks, Frankfurt am Main 2008, ISBN 978-3-940888-23-5.
- Kreuzungen, novel, 2008, ISBN 978-3-10-074434-0.
- Bildgirl. Collagen, 2009.
- Ich, Johanna Ey. Roman in 37 Bildtafeln, 2009.
- AUF fassung. Ein Videoessay. 2010.
- Das wird mir alles nicht passieren. Wie bleibe ich FeministIn, 11 stories, 2010.
- Die Schmerzmacherin, S. Fischer Verlag, Frankfurt am Main 2011, ISBN 978-3-10-074437-1.
- Nachkommen, S. Fischer Verlag, Frankfurt am Main 2014, ISBN 978-3-10-074445-6.
- Die Reise einer jungen Anarchistin in Griechenland. S. Fischer Verlag, Frankfurt am Main 2014, ISBN 978-3-10-002244-8.
- Poetik. Tübinger und Frankfurter Vorlesungen, Fischer Taschenbuch, Frankfurt am Main 2014, ISBN 978-3-596-19621-0
