= Fly Away Home (2016 film) =

- Directed by: Miriam Unger
- Written by: Sandra Bohle, Miriam Unger
- Produced by: Gabriele Kranzelbinder
- Starring: Zita Gaier; Ursula Strauss; Gerald Votava; Konstantin Khabensky
- Cinematography: Eva Testor
- Edited by: Niki Mossböck
- Music by: Eva Jantschitsch
- Production company: KGP Kranzelbinder Gabriele Production
- Release date: March 8, 2016 (Diagonale Graz)
- Running time: 109 minutes
- Country: Austria
- Language: German
- Budget: 3.4 million euros

Fly Away Home (German: Maikäfer flieg) is a 2016 Austrian drama film directed by Miriam Unger based on the biographical novel by Christine Nöstlinger.

== Plot ==
In Vienna during the end of the Second World War, the house of the Nöstlingers in Hernals is hit during air raids and is badly damaged. The mother of eight-year-old Christine therefore accepts the offer of Mrs. von Braun, the widow of a National Socialist, to move with her two daughters to a villa in Neuwaldegg, while the grandparents stay in the bombed apartment.

Christina's father as a soldier of the Wehrmacht is heavily wounded in his legs. He deserts from the hospital with shrapnel fragments in his leg, and returns to his family. As a deserter he has to hide from both German and Russian soldiers. After the capitulation of the Wehrmacht, Russian crew members quarter themselves in the villa. While most are afraid of the soldiers with their unpredictable nature and their constant drunkenness, Christine befriends the Russian field cook Cohn. Cohn brings Christine to her grandparents in a horse-drawn cart, and promises to pick her up soon to bring her back to the mansion, but he does not show up anymore. Instead, she is picked up by her father as Cohn was arrested because he is considered a deserter. After the departure of the Russians, the Nöstlingers move out of the villa.

== Cast ==
- Zita Gaier - Christine
- Ursula Strauss - Mother
- Gerald Votava - Father
- Konstantin Khabensky - Cohn
- Paula Brunner - Sister
- Krista Stadler - Grandmother
- Heinz Marecek - Grandfather
- Bettina Mittendorfer - Mrs. von Braun
- Denis Burgazliev - Major
- Ivan Shvedoff - Sergeant
- Lissy Pernthaler - Soldier Ludmilla
- Hilde Dalik - Archangel
- Alexander Jagsch - Forstrat

== Production ==
The shooting took place from June to August 2015 in Vienna, Lower Austria and South Tyrol.

Konstantin Khabensky had to learn his lines phonetically for his German speaking role as he did not know the language.
