= Ursula Strauss =

Austrian actress (born 1974)

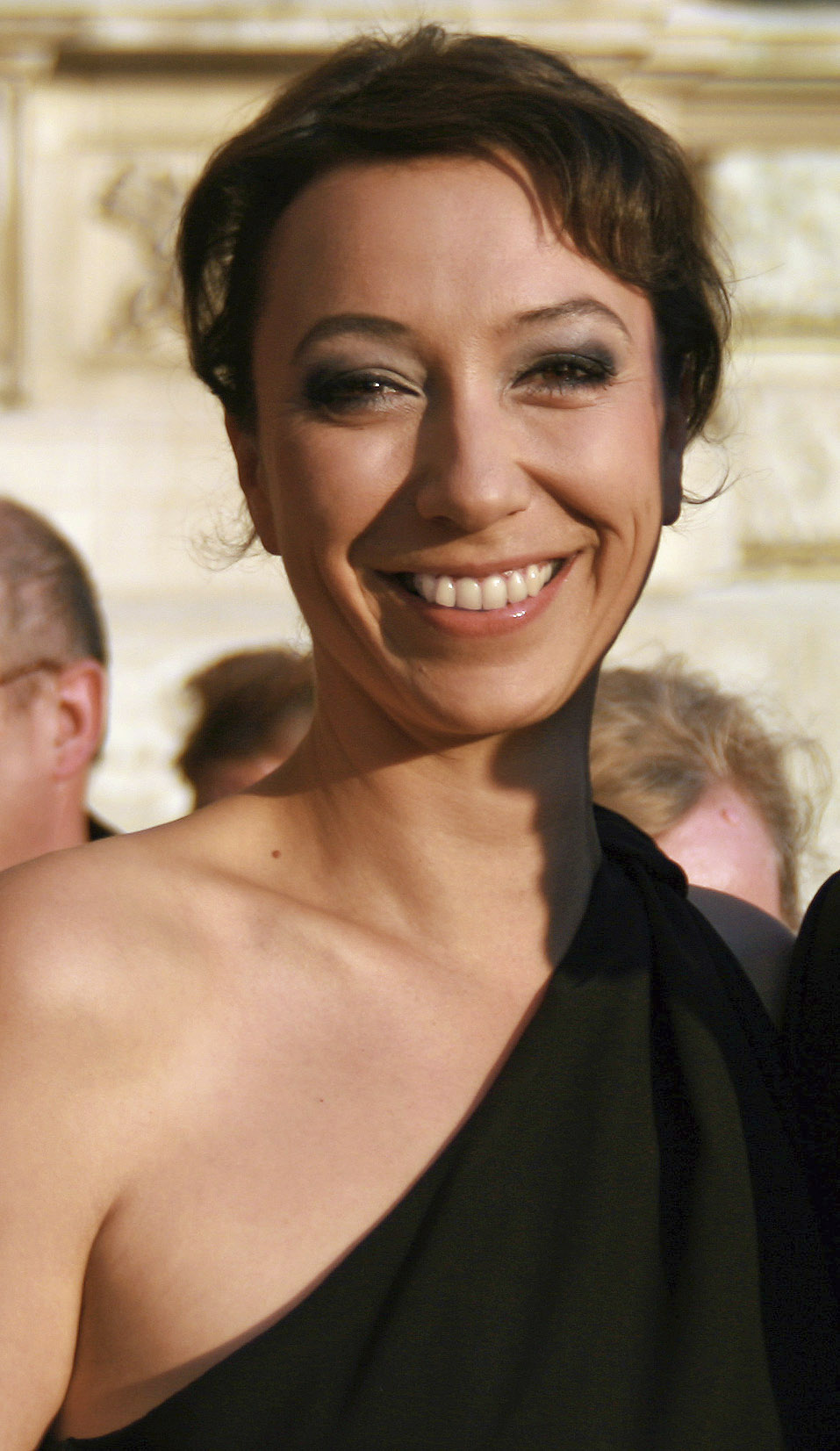
Ursula Strauss (2009)

Ursula Strauss (born 25 April 1974) is an Austrian actress. She is best known for her role as Inspector Angelika Schnell in the television series Schnell ermittelt. Strauss was born in Melk.

== Selected filmography ==
Film
Year	Title	Role	Notes
2026	AMS - Arbeit Muss Sein	Dr. Gabriele Possanner	
2023	Neue Geschichten vom Franz	Mama Franz	
2022	Geschichten vom Franz	Mama Franz	
2017	MindGamers	Da'Silva	
2016	Fly Away Home	Mother	
2016	Mein Fleisch und Blut	Katharina	
2013	October November		
2011	Michael		
2011	My Best Enemy	Lena	
2008	Revanche	Susanne	

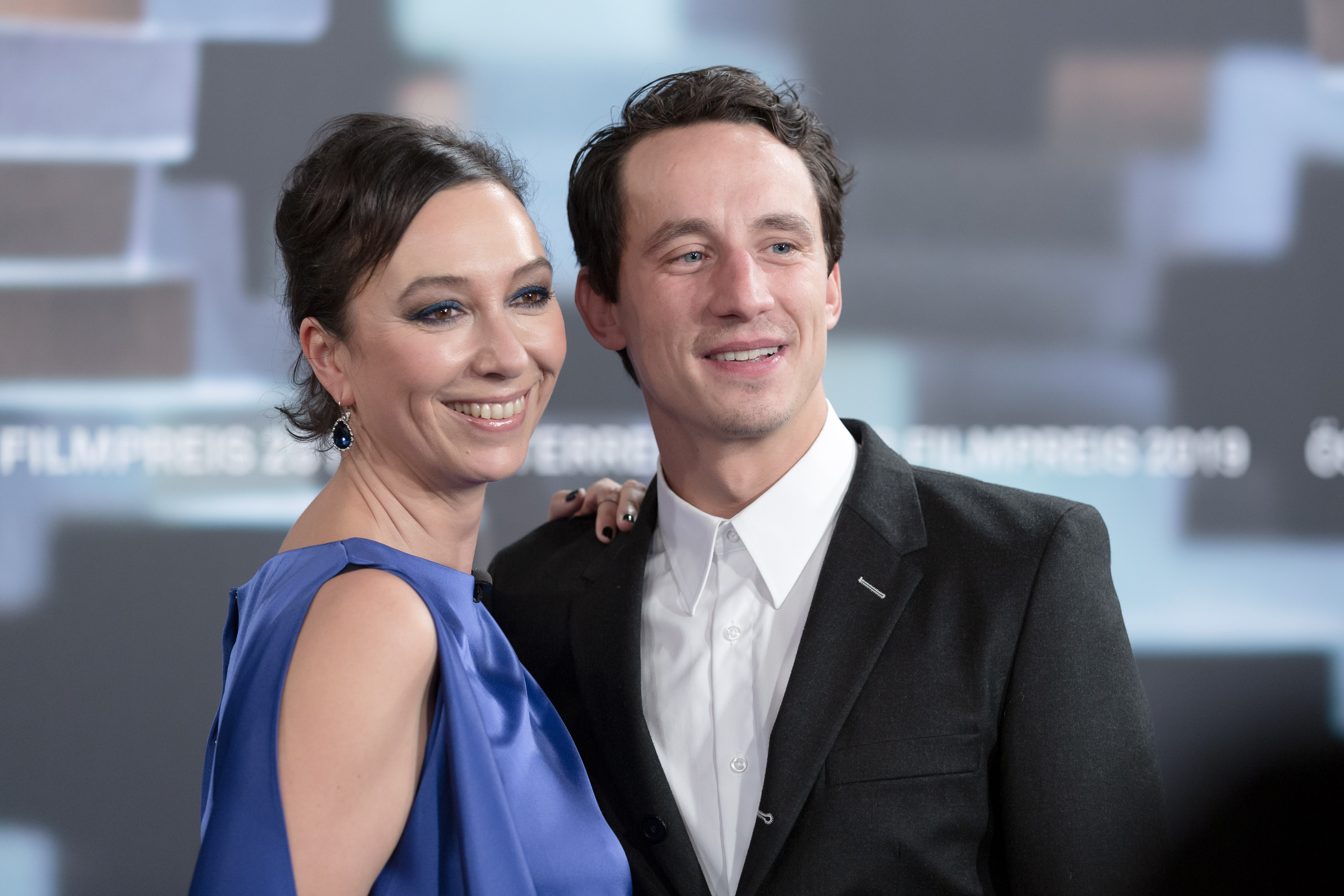
Strauss with Laurence Rupp in 2019.

TV
Year	Title	Role	Notes
2009-2024	Schnell ermittelt	Angelika Schnell	
2015	Altes Geld	Barbara Brunner	
2026	The Trap	Dr. Shelley Anger	Miniseries
