= Hagazussa =

- Theatrical release poster
- Directed by: Lukas Feigelfeld
- Written by: Lukas Feigelfeld
- Produced by: Lukas Feigelfeld; Simon Lubinski
- Starring: Aleksandra Cwen; Celina Peter; Claudia Martini; Tanja Petrovsky; Haymon Maria Buttinger
- Cinematography: Mariel Baqueiro
- Edited by: Jorg Volkmar
- Music by: MMMD
- Production companies: Deutsche Film- und Fernsehakademie Berlin; Retina Fabrik
- Distributed by: Forgotten Film Entertainment
- Release dates: September 22, 2017 (Fantastic Fest); May 17, 2018 (Germany)
- Running time: 102 minutes
- Countries: Germany; Austria
- Language: German

Hagazussa: A Heathen's Curse (German: hagazussa, an Old High German term for "witch") is a 2017 German-Austrian horror film written and directed by Lukas Feigelfeld in his feature directorial debut, and produced by Feigelfeld and Simon Lubinski. The film follows Aleksandra Cwen as goat-herder Albrun, who leads a secluded life in a remote part of the 15th-century Alps, an area which is fraught with belief in witches and fear of heathens and other non-Christian cultures.

The film, an international co-production between Germany and Austria, premiered at Fantastic Fest in Austin, Texas on 22 September 2017, and received a wide release in Germany on 17 May 2018. It received positive reviews from critics.

== Plot ==
A lonely young girl named Albrun lives with her goat-herding mother in the Alps of 15th century Austria. A traveler warns them to go back for fear of meeting the Perchta. One night, men disguised in goat skins and horns approach their cottage, bang on their door, call them witches, and insist that they should be burned. Later, the mother becomes ill. A doctor and nun from a nearby town discover bulbous growths below her armpit. Considering her too far gone, they leave. Albrun tends to her mother, whose physical and mental condition deteriorates rapidly, culminating in a sexual assault against her daughter. The mother runs out of the cottage into the winter night. In the morning, Albrun finds her mother's corpse covered with snakes in the woods.

Fifteen years later, Albrun is now a mother to an infant girl. Albrun tends goats in the hills, milking them and sometimes displaying an intimacy with them while she masturbates. Albrun carries milk to town to sell, but is rejected by the townspeople (due to their superstitions) and confronted by unruly boys who treat her as a pariah. The harassment is then interrupted by a passing townswoman, Swinda. Swinda later comes by Albrun's cottage to say that the village priest would like to speak to her.

The priest tells Albrun that her isolation and estrangement from others lead them to temptation that springs from sacrilege. As he hands Albrun her mother's polished skull, painted with flowers and greenery, he concludes, "To strengthen the faith of a religious community, it requires all sacrilege be cleansed." Albrun takes the skull and places it in a corner of her cottage. She surrounds it with flowers and a candle. When a visiting Swinda notices it, she promptly leaves. In seclusion, Albrun hears voices from the woods, including that of her mother. The sounds continue as she masturbates. The next day, Albrun tries to breastfeed her daughter, who refuses her nipple.

Later, while walking in the mountains with Albrun, Swinda warns her about "those who don't carry God in their hearts: the Jews and the heathens. They come in the night and like animals they take you, and then some months later you bear a child." En route, Swinda talks a local man into walking with them. After Swinda whispers something to the man, he turns to Albrun and embraces her. Swinda then throws Albrun to the ground and whispers, "It's disgusting how you all smell, your rotten stench." The man then begins raping Albrun as Swinda holds her down. Albrun later returns home and finds that her goats have all been stolen except for one, which has been butchered and mutilated. Furious, Albrun brings a dead rat to the local water source to poison the water and then urinates and menstruates into it. That night, Albrun lights a candle and communes with her mother's skull.

Albrun comes to town while holding her child, and sees many dead bodies being transported away. On the way home, she stops in the wood and eats a mushroom, which causes hallucinations and psychosis. In the midst of this, she walks into the stagnant pond with her daughter, letting her drown. She sinks under the murky water with her eyes open.

In her cabin, as Albrun sleeps, a snake travels over her body. She wakes up and, ignoring the snake, hears her mother calling her name. She rises and approaches the fireplace, hearing her mother's labored breathing. She discovers the body of her drowned baby, which she carried home with her. Distraught, she places her dead daughter into the soup that is boiling on the fire and, with shaking hands, eats from it. She soon vomits and screams in horror as the mushroom-induced psychosis returns. She sees her mother and hears laughing. The shadows on the walls seem to move menacingly, causing her to flee the cottage. In the dusky morning light, now with opaque eyes, Albrun lies down and dies on the mountaintop. Her body spontaneously combusts with the rising sun.

== Cast ==
- Aleksandra Cwen as Albrun
  - Celina Peter as Young Albrun
- Claudia Martini as Mutter
- Tanja Petrovsky as Swinda
- Haymon Maria Buttinger as Dorfpfarrer (village priest)
- Franz Stadler as Sepp
- Killian Abeltshauser as Farmer
- Gerdi Marlen Simonn as Baby Martha
- Thomas Petruo as Doctor
- Judith Geerts as Nun

== Production ==
Feigelfeld wrote, directed, and co-produced Hagazussa as his film school graduation project, partially financing it with crowdfunding donations. According to Feigelfeld:

"After researching about old pagan beliefs and folklore about witches, that were supposed to roam the mountain woods in those times, my interest was to develop a character that these folk tales would have branded as a witch, but to dig deeper into her psyche and see her as the traumatized, mistreated and finally delusional person that society constructed. As well as to understand what utterly evil things people were led to do while suffering from psychosis in the Middle Ages and being surrounded by superstition and religious prosecution. The film tries to depict a very personal and empathetic mental image of a nightmarish and sick mind."

The music for the film was composed by Greek dark ambient duo MMMD.

== Release ==
Hagazussa premiered in Austin, Texas at Fantastic Fest on 22 September 2017. The film toured the international film festival circuit that year, screening at such events as BFI London Film Festival and the Brooklyn Horror Film Festival. It received a wide release in Germany on 17 May 2018, and later received a limited release in the United States on 19 April 2019 through distribution by Music Box Films's genre subsidiary Doppelgänger.

== Reception ==
On review aggregator Rotten Tomatoes, Hagazussa holds an approval rating of 93%, based on 29 reviews, and an average rating of 7.5/10. Its consensus reads, "Hagazussa: A Heathen's Curse weaves a spooky supernatural story that should satisfy horror fans with more adventurous inclinations." On Metacritic, the film has a weighted average score of 72 out of 100, based on 6 critics, indicating "generally favorable reviews".

Stephen Dalton of The Hollywood Reporter called the film a "spooky, stylish, spellbinding debut", writing that "even if the open-ended story does not satisfy conventional genre rules, Hagazussa works very well as a spellbinding audiovisual symphony". Phil Nobile Jr., writing for Birth.Movies.Death., wrote "Visually stunning and narratively assured, [Hagazussa] presents its horror as the slowest of burns, its ambiguous, stark presentation of the supernatural eventually giving way to tangible, colorful revulsion". Brad Miska of Bloody Disgusting wrote that "Hagazussa is Germany's answer to The Witch that has stunning atmosphere mixed with brooding terror from start to finish". Noel Murray of the Los Angeles Times wrote that "for those who can embrace “Hagazussa” more as an experience than as a spook show, this film is utterly absorbing and hard to shake".

Dennis Harvey of Variety called the film "gorgeously unsettling", writing that "this enigmatic folktale-cum-horror is likely to flummox or even exasperate mainstream genre fans with its sparse plotting, slow pace, and near-impenetrable mysteries. But its mix of the poetical, repugnant, and phantasmagorical will weave a singular spell for more adventuresome, arthouse-friendly viewers". Nick Allen of RogerEbert.com gave the film 2 1/2 out of 4 stars, praising Feigelfeld's "precise vision" and Cwen's "intense performance", but calling the film "atmospheric and muted ... Those are noble values for a horror movie, but it's a shame they’ve lead [sic] to a frustrating genre pic that's just too dreary to be scary".
