= Franziska Weisz =

Austrian actress (born 1980)

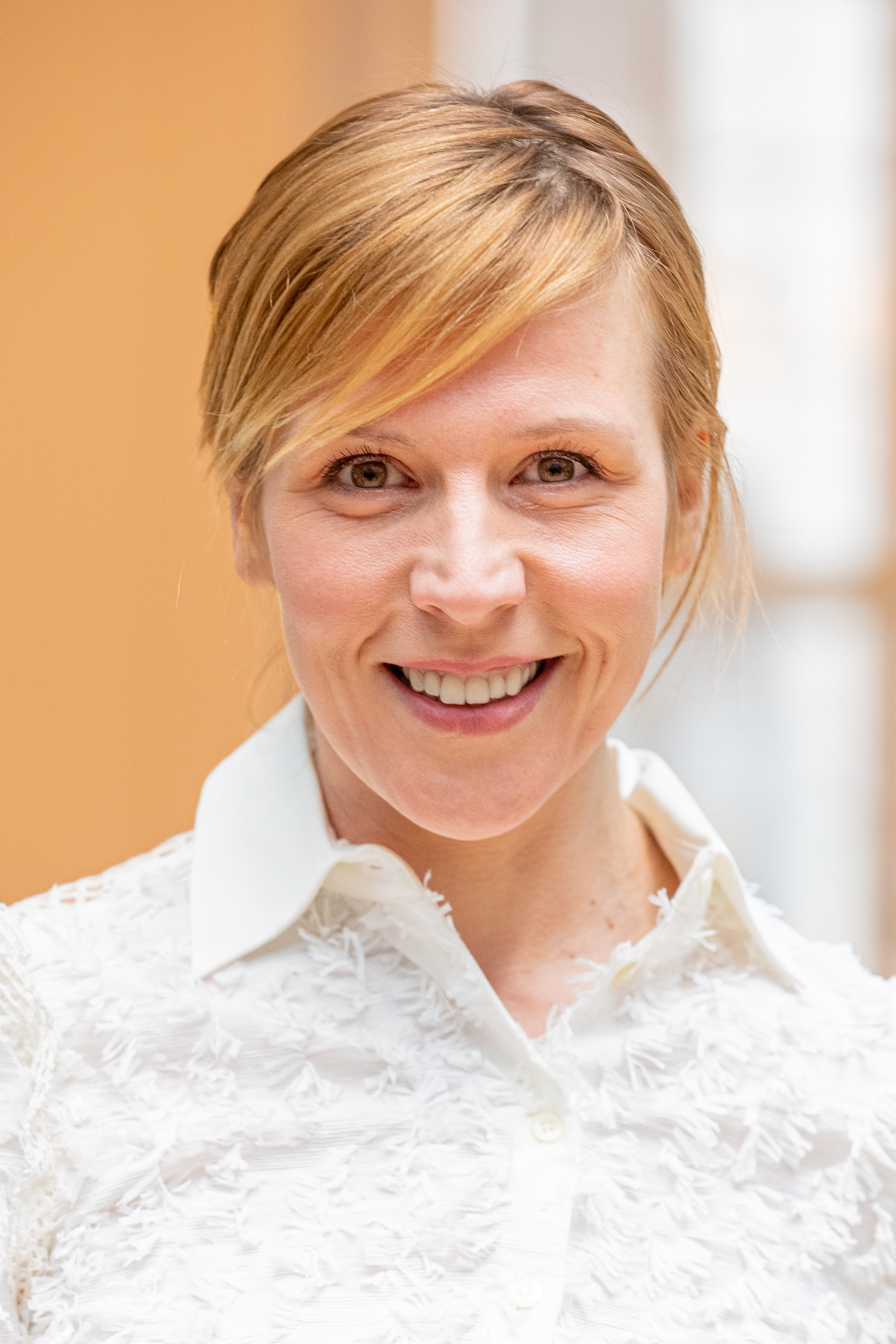
- Franziska Weisz, Berlinale 2020
- Born: 4 May 1980 (age 46); Vienna, Austria
- Occupation: Actress
- Years active: 2001–present
- Spouse: Felix Herzogenrath (m. 2015)
- Website: http://www.franziskaweisz.com/

Franziska Weisz (also credited as Franziska Weiss or Weiß; born 4 May 1980 in Vienna) is an Austrian actress. She starred in the film Hotel, which was screened in the Un Certain Regard section at the 2004 Cannes Film Festival.

== Filmography ==
=== Cinema ===
- Hanna's sleeping Dogs (2016)
- The Lies you sleep with (2014)
- Stations of the Cross (2014)
- Habermann (2010)
- The Robber (2010)
- Die Diebe (2005)
- Zum Beispiel Praterstern (2005)
- Hotel (2004)
- C(r)ook (2004)
- Hundstage (2001)
- The Piano Teacher (2000)

=== Television ===
- The Swarm (2023)
- SOKO Kitzbühel (2005)
- Mein Mörder (2004)
- 4 Frauen und ein Todesfall (2004)
- Tatort - Der Wächter der Quelle (2003)
- In Liebe vereint (2003)
- Julia - Eine ungewöhnliche Frau (2002)

=== Theater ===
- Sommerspiele Perchtoldsdorf (2005)
