= Sabine Derflinger =

Austrian film director, screenwriter and film producer

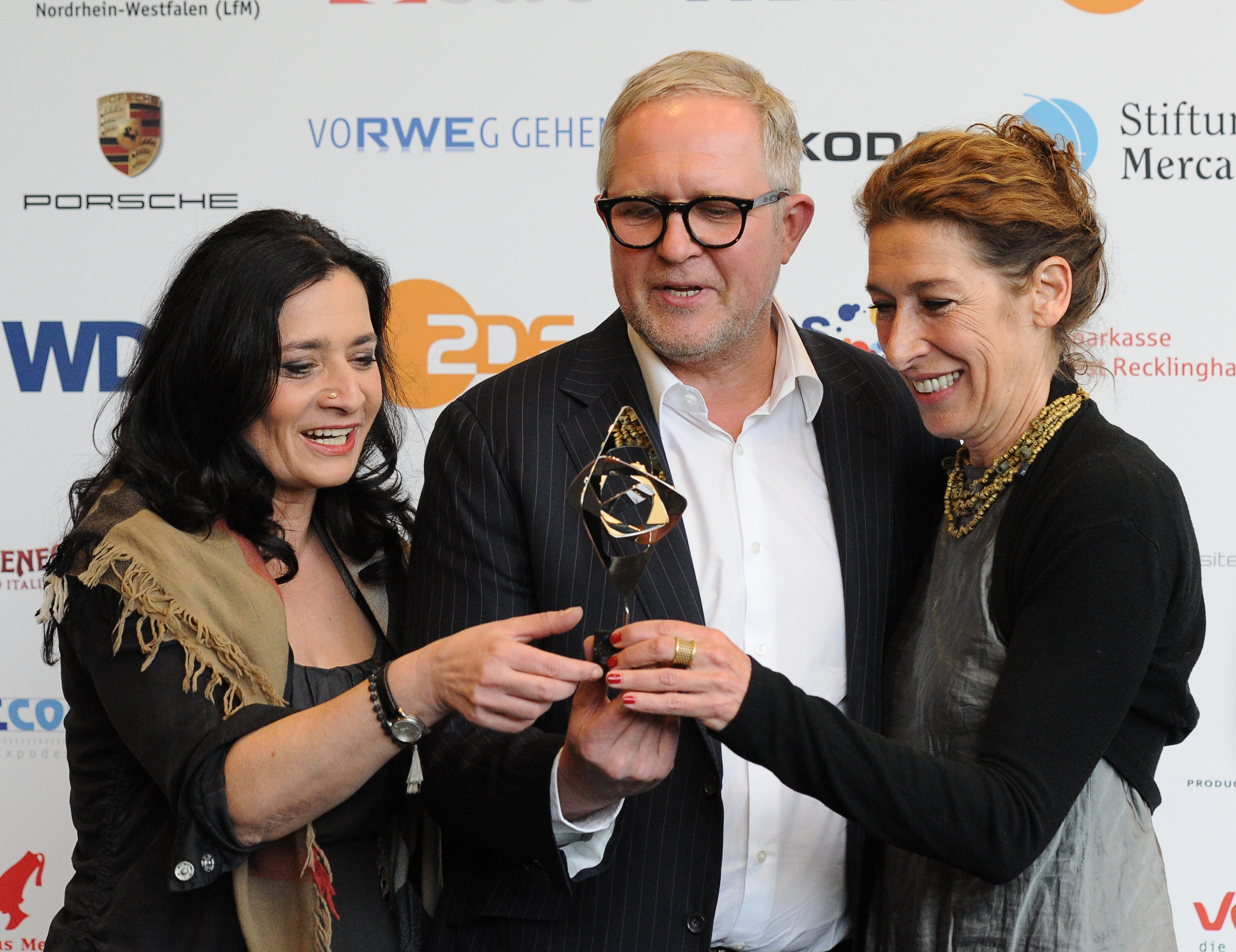
- Sabine Derflinger (left) with Adele Heuhauser and Harald Krassnitzer at the Grimme-Awards 2014
- Born: 1963 (age 62–63); Wels, Austria
- Occupations: Film director, producer, screenwriter
- Years active: 1991–present

Sabine Derflinger (born 1963 in Wels, Austria) is an Austrian film director, screenwriter, producer and dramaturgical consultant. She lives and works in Vienna and Berlin. Many of her films have won several awards, notably Geraubte Kindheit (Stolen Childhood), Vollgas (Step on it), Kleine Schwester (Little Sister), 42plus and Tag und Nacht (Day and Night). She is also well known for directing a number of films in the cult series Tatort.

She has been celebrated as an Austrian pioneer in campaigning for more visibility for women in directing of films. In 2012, she was awarded the Viennese Women's Prize for her work.

== Career ==
In 1991, Sabine Derflinger began her studies at the Filmacademy Vienna (special fields of script and dramaturgy), after having already worked several years in the film business as a director’s and production assistant. In 1996 she successfully finished her studies with her thesis "Movie narratives between Epic & Drama".

Sabine Derflinger is known for several feature and documentary films, many of which have won awards. Furthermore, she is the first woman to have directed an Austrian chapter of the German/Austrian/Swiss cult crime series Tatort. By now she has directed two Austrian chapters (Falsch verpackt (False Labelling); Angezählt (Down for the Count)) and one German Tatort chapter (Borowski und das Meer (Borowski and the Sea)). Tatort Angezählt, which is set in Vienna's world of prostitutes and pimps, initiated a broad discussion about prostitution in the Austrian and German media. Paul Kemp - Alles kein Problem (Paul Kemp - No problem at all) and Vier Frauen und ein Todesfall (Four Women and a Funeral) are further series that Sabine Derflinger has directed for the Austrian broadcaster ORF. Her film Tag und Nacht (Day and Night) captured great media attention. Anna Red, that played lead role won "Best Actress" during the New York Film Festival in 2011. Her colleague Magdalena Kronschläger was nominated for "Best Actress" during the Austrian Film Prize 2011.

In 2010, Sabine Derflinger founded her own production company called Derflinger Film. Since then she has produced the following movies: The Rounder Girls, Schnelles Geld (Easy Money), Eine von 8 (One out of 8) and What Remains. In 2013 Derflinger Film was hired as the service production for the Brazilian television network Globo TV, which shot several episodes of their telenovela Em Família in Vienna. The documentary Vom Umgang mit der Schuld (Dealing with guilt) is currently under production.

== Filmography ==
- 1991: Es war einmal (Once upon a time) – script, director, producer
- 1994: Geraubte Kindheit (Stolen Childhood) – concept, director (in cooperation with Bernhard Pötscher)
- 1996: Achtung Staatsgrenze (Warning: National Border) – concept, director (in cooperation with Bernhard Pötscher)
- 1998: Aus Liebe (Of Love) – script, director (in cooperation with Astrid Heubrandtner)
- 1999: The Rounder Girls – concept, director, producer (in cooperation with Bernhard Pötscher)
- 2001: Vollgas (Step on it) – director, script (in cooperation with Maria Scheibelhofer)
- 2004: Kleine Schwester (Little Sister) – director
- 2004: Schnelles Geld (Easy money) – concept, director, producer
- 2005: DREI, VIER (THREE, FOUR) – script, director, producer
- 2006: In den Straßen von Delhi (On the streets of Delhi) – concept, director
- 2007: 42plus – director, script (in cooperation with Mogens Rukov)
- 2008: Platz – director
- 2008: Eine von 8 (One out of 8) – concept, director
- 2009: Was bleibt (What remains) – producer
- 2010: Tag und Nacht (Day and Night) – director, script
- 2011: Hotspot – director
- 2012: Tatort – Falsch verpackt (False Labelling) – director
- 2012: Literatur hat Recht - Social Spot (Literature’s Right(s)) - director
- 2012: For Those Who Can Tell No Tales - Executive Producer
- 2013: Tatort - Angezählt (Down for the Count) - director
- 2013: Paul Kemp - Alles kein Problem (Paul Kemp - No problem at all) - director
- 2013: Tatort - Borowski und das Meer (Borowski and the sea) - director
- 2013: Vier Frauen und ein Todesfall (Four Women and a Funeral) - director
- 2014: Vorstadtweiber - director

== Awards ==
- 1994: Hans Cermak Preis for Geraubte Kindheit (Stolen Childhood)
- 1996: Interkulturpreis Oberösterreich for Achtung Staatsgrenze (Warning: National Border)
- 1997: Talent scholarship Upper Austria
- 1998: Grünpreis Kultur for The Rounder Girls
- 1998: Carl Mayer Script Scholarship for Vollgas (Step on it)
- 2001: Thomas Pluch Förderungspreis for Vollgas (Step on it)
- 2002: Max Ophüls Festival – Förderpreis Langfilm der Jury for Vollgas (Step on it)
- 2003: Kulturpreis des Landes Oberösterreich für Film
- 2003: Österreichischer Förderpreis für Filmkunst
- 2004: Filmfest München – VFF TV-Movie Award for Kleine Schwester (Little Sister)
- 2004: Darstellerpreis von Baden-Baden for Kleine Schwester (Little Sister)
- 2005: ver.di Fernsehpreis für Kleine Schwester (Little Sister)
- 2008: Golden Rooster and Hundred Flowers Film Festival in China - prize for the best actress for Claudia Michelsen in 42plus
- 2011: NYCFF - prize for the best actress for Anna Rot in Tag und Nacht (Day and Night)
- 2011: Diagonale - prize for best costume for Veronika Albert and Monika Buttinger in Tag und Nacht (Day and Night)
- 2012: Women’s prize from the city of Vienna. Citation: "In the competitive world of film, she is one of the few women, who asserts herself, with great skill and extraordinarily hard work and persistence".
- 2013: Grimme Award for: Tatort – Down for the Count
