= Martin Gschlacht =

Austrian cinematographer

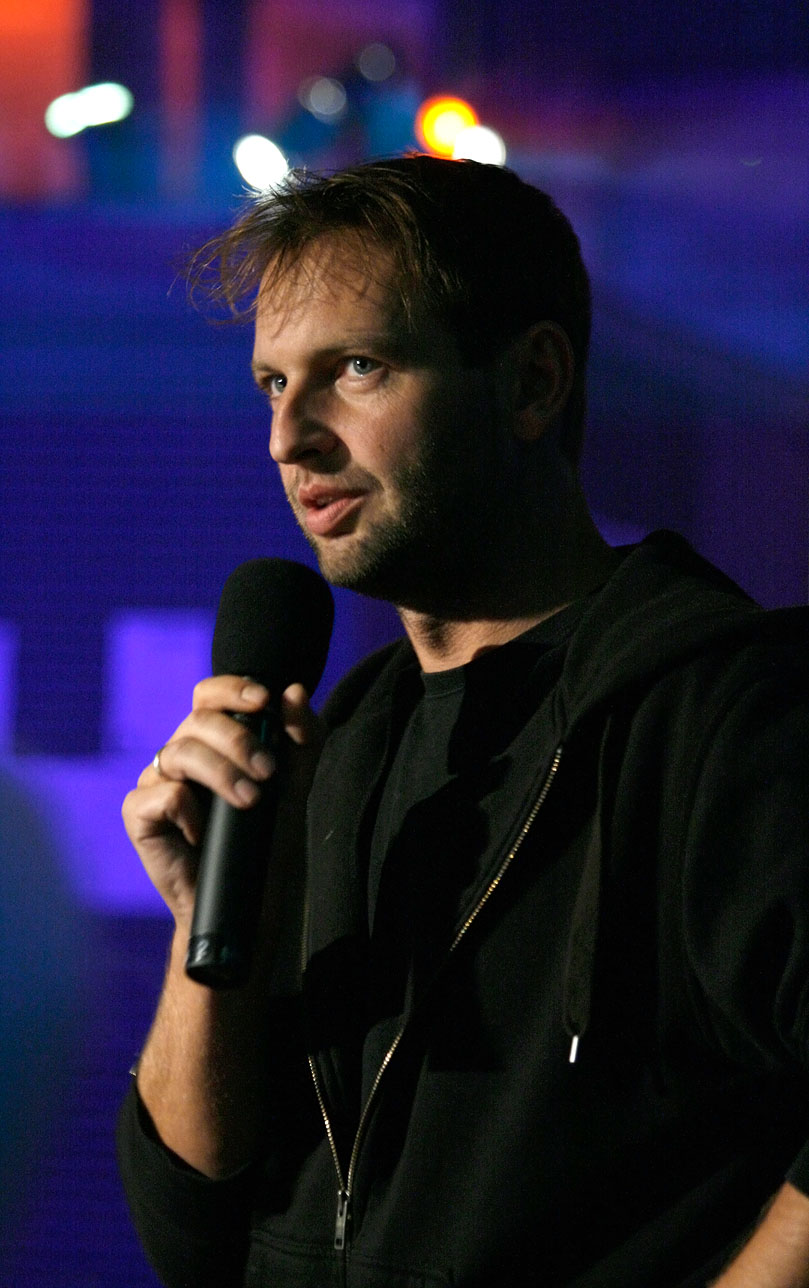
- Born: 1969 (age 56–57); Vienna, Austria
- Years active: 1992-present

Martin Gschlacht (born 1969) is an Austrian cinematographer.

== Filmography ==
=== Short film ===
Cinematographer

Year	Title	Director	Notes
1992	Sushi	Stephan Wagner	
1996	Mah Jongg & Die Frisur des Paten	Antonin Svoboda	
2000	Lighthouse	Mark Cairns	
2002	Die ganze Nacht	Mirjam Unger	
2004	Mars	Barbara Albert	Segment of Visions of Europe
2005	Zarin	Shirin Neshat	
2012	Earthmoving	Johannes Grenzfurthner	
2018	The Sinful Women of Hollfall	Veronika Franz; Severin Fiala	Segment of The Field Guide to Evil
2019	Kingdom	Bettina Oberli	

Producer

- Flora (1995)

=== Feature film ===
Cinematogrpher

Year	Title	Director	Notes
1999	Inter-View	Jessica Hausner	
1999	Luna Papa	Bakhtyar Khudojnazarov	With Dusan Joksimovic, Rostislav Pirumov and Rali Raltschev
1999	Ratrace	Valentin Hitz	
2001	Lovely Rita	Jessica Husner	
2003	Kaltfront	Valentin Hitz	
2003	In the Beginning Was the Eye	Bady Minck	With Jerzy Palacz and Martin Putz
2003	Free Radicals	Barbara Albert	
2004	Hotel	Jessica Husner	
2004	Antares	Götz Spielmann	
2005	Spiele Leben	Antonin Svoboda	
2006	Slumming	Michael Glawogger	
2006	Toast	Jessica Husner	
2007	Immer nie am Meer	Antonin Svoboda	
2008	Revanche	Götz Spielmann	
2009	Was du nicht siehst	Wolfgang Fischer	
2009	Lourdes	Jessica Husner	
2009	Women Without Men	Shirin Neshat	
2011	Black Brown White	Erwin Wagenhofer	
2011	Breathing	Karl Markovics	
2012	Grenzgänger	Florian Flicker	
2012	The Strange Case of Wilhelm Reich	Antonin Svoboda	
2013	Oktober November	Götz Spielmann	
2014	Amour Fou	Jessica Husner	
2014	Cure: The Life of Another	Andrea Štaka	
2014	In the Basement	Ulrich Seidl	Documentary film
2014	Goodnight Mommy	Veronika Franz; Severin Fiala	
2014	Therapy for a Vampire	David Ruehm	
2015	Drei Eier im Glas	Antonin Svoboda	
2016	Stille Reserven	Valentin Hitz	
2017	Tehran Taboo	Ali Soozandeh	
2017	Looking for Oum Kulthum	Shirin Neshat; Shoja Azari	
2018	Alpha	Albert Hughes	
2019	Little Joe	Jessica Hausner	
2020	Hochwald	Evi Romen	With Jerzy Palacz
2023	Club Zero	Jessica Hausner	
2024	The Devil's Bath	Veronika Franz; Severin Fiala	
2025	Happyland	Evi Romen	
2025	Voor de meisjes	Mike van Diem	
2026	The Blood Countess	Ulrike Ottinger	

Producer

- Ratrace (1995)
- Free Radicals (2003)
- Hotel (2004)
- Darwin's Nightmare (2004) (Documentary film)
- Sleeper (2005)
- Spiele Leben (2005)
- Slumming (2006) (Co-producer)
- Fallen (2006)
- Immer nie am Meer (2007)
- Reclaim Your Brain (2007)
- März (2008)
- Lourdes (2009)
- Women Without Men (2009)
- The Wall (2012)
- The Strange Case of Wilhelm Reich (2012)
- Oktober November (2013)
- Amour Fou (2014)
- Drei Eier im Glas (2015)
- Looking for Oum Kulthum (2017)
- Little Joe (2019)

=== Television ===
Year	Title	Director	Notes
1999-2000	MA 2412	Harald Sicheritz	9 episodes
2001	Dolce Vita & Co	Erhard Riedlsperger; Claudia Jüptner	10 episodes
2022	Tatort	Thomas Roth	Episode "Das Tor zur Hölle"

TV movies

Year	Title	Director	Notes
2001	Spiel im Morgengrauen	Götz Spielmann	
2006	Das gefrorene Meer	Lukas Miko	Also co-producer
2008	Daniel Käfer - Die Schattenuhr	Julian Pölsler	
2009	Geliebter Johann geliebte Anna	Julian Pölsler	
2011	Die Schatten, die dich holen	Robert Dornhelm	
2016	Bergfried	Jo Baier	
2019	Wiener Blut	Barbara Eder	
2019	Dark Cargo	Lodge Kerrigan	
2020	Letzter Kirtag	Julian Pölsler	
2022	Der weiße Kobold	Marvin Kren	

Miniseries

Year	Title	Director
2016	Das Geheimnis der Hebamme	Roland Suso Richter
2019	M - Eine Stadt sucht einen Mörder	David Schalko
2021	Ich und die anderen	David Schalko
2024	Kafka	David Schalko
2025	Warum ich?	David Schalko

== Awards and nominations ==
Year	Award	Category	Title	Result	Ref.
2011	Camerimage Awards	Best Director Debut	Breathing	Won	
2014	European Film Awards	Best Cinematographer	Goodnight Mommy	Won	
2024	Berlin International Film Festival	Silver Bear for Outstanding Artistic Contribution	The Devil's Bath	Won	
