= Götz Spielmann =

Austrian director and scriptwriter (born 1961)

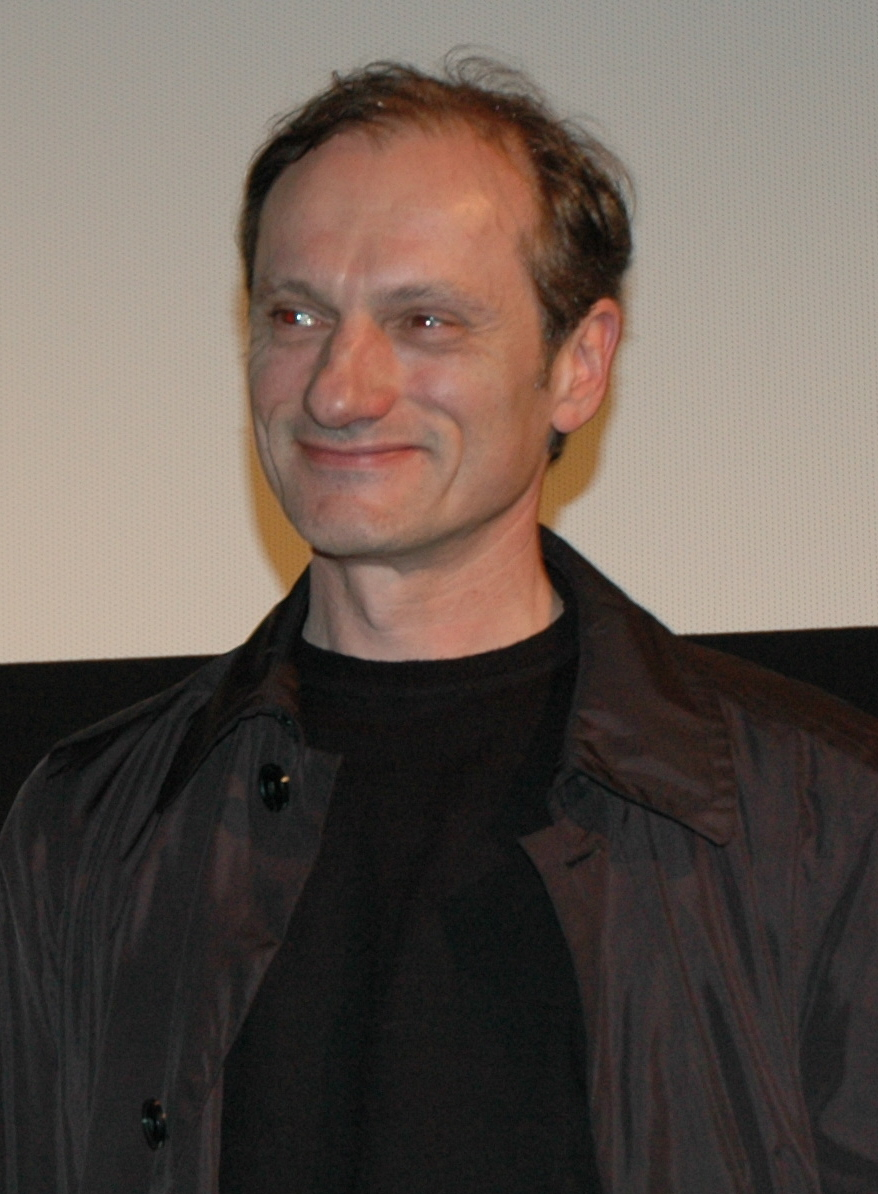
- Spielmann presenting Revanche at the Crossing Europe film festival Linz, Austria
- Born: 11 January 1961 (age 64); Wels, Austria

Götz Spielmann (born 11 January 1961) is an Austrian director and scriptwriter.

== Early life ==
Spielmann was born in Wels, Austria, and grew up in Vienna. After High School, he lived in Paris for several months. From 1980 to 1987 he studied film direction and script-writing in Vienna at the University of Music and Performing Arts, Vienna. At the Viennese Filmacadamy, his professors included Harald Zusanek and Axel Corti.

== Career ==
After making several short films, and receiving his diploma with Vergiss Sneider!, with the drama Erwin und Julia, Spielmann had his first great success. In 1993, his film Der Nachbar won the Vienna Filmaward at the Viennale. And in 1994, his film for television Dieses naive Verlangen was awarded with the Erich-Neuberg-Preis. In 2006, he was honored with the Upper Austrian Landeskulturpreis in the “Film” section.

Spielmann is one of the most important contemporary Austrian film directors. His films The Stranger and Antares were the Austrian candidates for Oscar nomination for Best Foreign Language Film. Antares has been screened widely at more than thirty International Film Festivals.

Spielmann is on the committee of the Verband der Filmregisseure Österreichs (the Association of the Austrian film directors).

In the Linzer Kammerspiele (Linz, Upper Austria) he made his debut as theatre director with the performance of the play Der einsame Weg, written by Arthur Schnitzler. For the season 2006/2007, he wrote his first play for the theatre, the Landestheater Linz, Imperium, which was first released on 5 January 2007 at the Linzer Kammerspiele.

In January 2009 Spielmann's Revanche was nominated for an Academy Award for Best Foreign Language Film.

== Filmography ==
Year	Title	Director	Writer	Notes
1987	Vergiss Snider!	Yes	Yes	
1990	Erwin und Julia	Yes	Yes	Nominated for Golden Leopard, 1991 Locarno Film Festival
1993	Der Nachbar (1993)	Yes	Yes	
1993	Dieses naive Verlangen (1993)	Yes	Yes	
1995	*Loveable Lies	Yes	Yes	aka Pretty Lies
1996	Fear of the Idyll (Die Angst vor der Idylle)	Yes	Yes	Die Angst vor der Idylle
2000	The Stranger	Yes	Yes	Die Fremde
2001	Spiel im Morgengrauen	Yes	Yes	
2004	Antares	Yes	Yes	Nominated for Golden Leopard, 2004 Locarno Film Festival
2008	Revanche	Yes	Yes	Nominated for Best Foreign Language Film 2009 Academy Awards
2013	October November	Yes	Yes	
2019	Südpol	No	Yes	TV Movie
2022	Der Schutzengel	Yes	Yes	TV Movie
