= Great Freedom =

2021 film by Sebastian Meise

- Theatrical release poster
- German: Große Freiheit
- Directed by: Sebastian Meise
- Written by: Thomas Reider; Sebastian Meise
- Produced by: Sabine Moser; Oliver Neumann; Benny Dreschel
- Starring: Franz Rogowski; Georg Friedrich; Anton von Lucke; Thomas Prenn
- Cinematography: Crystel Fournier
- Edited by: Joana Scrinzi
- Music by: Nils Petter Molvær; Peter Brötzmann
- Production companies: FreibeuterFilm; Rohfilm Productions
- Distributed by: Filmladen Filmverleih (Austria); Piffl Medien (Germany)
- Release dates: 8 July 2021 (Cannes); 18 November 2021 (Germany); 19 November 2021 (Austria)
- Running time: 116 minutes
- Countries: Austria; Germany
- Language: German
- Box office: $217,227

Great Freedom (German: Große Freiheit) is a 2021 drama film co-written and directed by Sebastian Meise. It was selected to compete in the Un Certain Regard section at the 74th Cannes Film Festival, which won the Jury Prize in the same section. It won the Golden Giraldillo at the Seville European Film Festival. It was selected as the Austrian entry for the Best International Feature Film at the 94th Academy Awards, and on 22 December 2021, it was shortlisted for the award ceremony.

The film was released theatrically on 18 November 2021 in Germany by Piffl Medien and the following day in Austria by Filmladen Filmverleih.

== Plot ==
In 1968, Hans Hoffmann is imprisoned for cottaging. While sewing in the prison's thread mill, he spots a former cellmate named Viktor Bix, who was sentenced to 20 years for a murder—and is soon up for parole. He later meets a young inmate named Leo, with whom he had been exchanging eye contact and is also imprisoned for cottaging. During yard time, Hans attempts to rescue Leo from bullying, culminating in the assault of another inmate. Hans ends up in solitary confinement (where Viktor sneaks him some cigarettes and matches) and reminisces about his life.

In 1945, Hans was a concentration camp inmate due to his sexual orientation. After the liberation of the camp by the Allied forces, he was transferred into the same prison he went into in 1968, because homosexuality remains illegal. He meets Viktor, who is aggressive towards Hans at first, but then he notices that Hans has a number tattoo on his arm, and offers to cover it up with another picture. Hans agrees.

In 1957, Hans is imprisoned again for secretly cohabiting with his boyfriend Oskar, who is put into the same prison. Oskar is burdened by his inability to live his true life and commits suicide. Viktor relays the news to Hans during yard time, and Hans bursts out in tears. Viktor hugs him in an attempt to help, and they both are thrown into solitary confinement.

When Hans enters the prison in 1968, he sees that Viktor has significantly deteriorated and started using intravenous drugs. Leo informs Hans that he told the police that Hans forced him to commit homosexual acts; Hans signs a confession to that, and Leo is let go. Hans offers Viktor to help him go cold turkey. Viktor bribes a guard, and Hans is transferred into Viktor's cell. Viktor greatly suffers from withdrawal and tries to secretly inject himself with drugs during the night, but Hans wakes up and notices that, then flushes the drugs down the toilet and hugs Viktor as he tries to break away. In the morning, they wake up in the same bed.

Next year, Hans notices an issue of Der Spiegel with a large story about the partial repeal of Paragraph 175 at the cover: homosexual acts are now decriminalised. Despondent Hans tells Viktor that he is getting released and will not be back.

After release, Hans immediately goes to the basement of a gay bar and sees many men openly having sex with each other. Hans exits the bar, picks a brick and smashes the window of a jewellery shop, takes several items and puts them into his pockets, then sits down at the kerb, waiting for the police to arrive.

== Cast ==
- Franz Rogowski as Hans Hoffmann
- Georg Friedrich as Viktor Bix
- Anton von Lucke as Leo Giese
- Thomas Prenn as Oskar
- Alfred Hartung as Warden (1945)
- Thomas Wehling as Warden (1957)
- Thomas Stecher as Warden (1968)
- Mex Schlüpfer as Viktor's Cellmate (1957)

== Reception ==
=== Critical reception ===
On the review aggregator website Rotten Tomatoes, the film holds an approval rating of 97% based on 60 reviews from critics, with an average rating of 8.1/10. The site's critical consensus reads, "With intelligence and sensitivity, Great Freedom draws on past injustices to present a beautifully crafted tribute to the persistence of the human spirit" On Metacritic, the film has a weighted average score of 89 out of 100, based on 18 reviews, indicating "universal acclaim".

=== Awards and nominations ===
Award	Date of ceremony	Category	Recipient(s)	Result	Ref.
Diagonale	13 June 2021	Diagonale Actor Award	Georg Friedrich	Won	
Diagonale	13 June 2021	Diagonale Award for Best Camera	Crystel Fournier	Won	
Diagonale	13 June 2021	VAM Award for Outstanding Production Achievement	Sabine Moser and Oliver Neumann	Won	
Diagonale	13 June 2021	Diagonale Award for Best Editing	Joana Scrinzi	Won	
Cannes Film Festival	17 July 2021	Un Certain Regard Jury Prize	Sebastian Meise	Won	
Cannes Film Festival	17 July 2021	Queer Palm	Sebastian Meise	Won	
Sarajevo Film Festival	20 August 2021	Heart of Sarajevo - Best Film	Great Freedom	Won	
Sarajevo Film Festival	20 August 2021	CICAE Award	Great Freedom	Won	
Sarajevo Film Festival	20 August 2021	Heart of Sarajevo - Best Actor	Georg Friedrich	Won	
Festival du nouveau cinéma	18 October 2021	International Competition, Grand Prize	Sebastian Meise	Won	
Chicago International Film Festival	24 October 2021	Gold Q-Hugo	Great Freedom	Won	
Vienna International Film Festival	31 October 2021	Best Feature	Great Freedom	Won	
Vienna International Film Festival	31 October 2021	ExtraVALUE Film Award - Best Feature Film	Great Freedom	Won	
Seville European Film Festival	13 November 2021	Golden Giraldillo Award for Best Film	Great Freedom	Won	
Seville European Film Festival	13 November 2021	ASECAN Award	Sebastian Meise	Won	
Seville European Film Festival	13 November 2021	Best Actor	Franz Rogowski	Won	
Zagreb Film Festival	21 November 2021	Golden Pram - Best Feature Film	Great Freedom	Won	
Tallinn Black Nights Film Festival	28 November 2021	DDA Spotlight Award	Great Freedom	Won	
European Film Awards	11 December 2021	Best Actor	Franz Rogowski	Nominated	
European Film Awards	11 December 2021	Best Composer	Nils Petter Molvaer and Peter Brötzmann	Won	
European Film Awards	11 December 2021	Best Cinematographer	Crystel Fournier	Won	
European Film Awards	11 December 2021	European University Film Award	Great Freedom	Nominated	
Austrian Film Awards	30 June 2022	Best Feature Film	Sabine Moser, Oliver Neumann, Benny Drechsel, Sebastian Meise	Won	
Austrian Film Awards	30 June 2022	Best Director	Sebastian Meise	Won	
Austrian Film Awards	30 June 2022	Best Actor	Georg Friedrich	Won	
Austrian Film Awards	30 June 2022	Best Actor	Franz Rogowski	Nominated	
Austrian Film Awards	30 June 2022	Best Supporting Actor	Thomas Prenn	Won	
Austrian Film Awards	30 June 2022	Best Screenplay	Thomas Reider and Sebastian Meise	Won	
Austrian Film Awards	30 June 2022	Best Cinematography	Crystel Fournier	Won	
Austrian Film Awards	30 June 2022	Best Make-Up	Heiko Schmidt, Roman Braunhofer and Kerstin Gaecklein	Won	
Austrian Film Awards	30 June 2022	Best Music	Peter Brötzmann and Nils Petter Molvaer	Nominated	
Austrian Film Awards	30 June 2022	Best Editing	Joana Scrinzi	Won	
German Film Awards	24 June 2022	Best Film	Benny Drechsel, Sabine Moser and Oliver Neumann	Won	
German Film Awards	24 June 2022	Best Director	Sebastian Meise	Nominated	
German Film Awards	24 June 2022	Best Actor	Franz Rogowski	Nominated	
German Film Awards	24 June 2022	Best Screenplay	Thomas Reider, Sebastian Meise	Nominated	
German Film Awards	24 June 2022	Best Cinematography	Crystel Fournier	Nominated	
German Film Awards	24 June 2022	Best Editing	Joana Scrinzi	Nominated	
German Film Awards	24 June 2022	Best Costume Design	Tanja Hausner, Andrea Hölzl	Nominated	
German Film Awards	24 June 2022	Best Make-Up	Heiko Schmidt, Roman Braunhofer and Kerstin Gaecklein	Won	
Deutscher Schauspielpreis	9 September 2022	Best Actor in a Dramatic Leading Role	Franz Rogowski	Won	
Deutscher Schauspielpreis	9 September 2022	Best Actor in a Dramatic Supporting Role	Georg Friedrich	Nominated	
European Film Awards	10 December 2022	Lux Award	Great Freedom	Nominated	

== See also ==
- Paragraph 175
- Paragraph 175 (film)
- List of submissions to the 94th Academy Awards for Best International Feature Film
- List of Austrian submissions for the Academy Award for Best International Feature Film
