= Nobuhiro Suwa =

Japanese film director

- 諏訪 敦彦
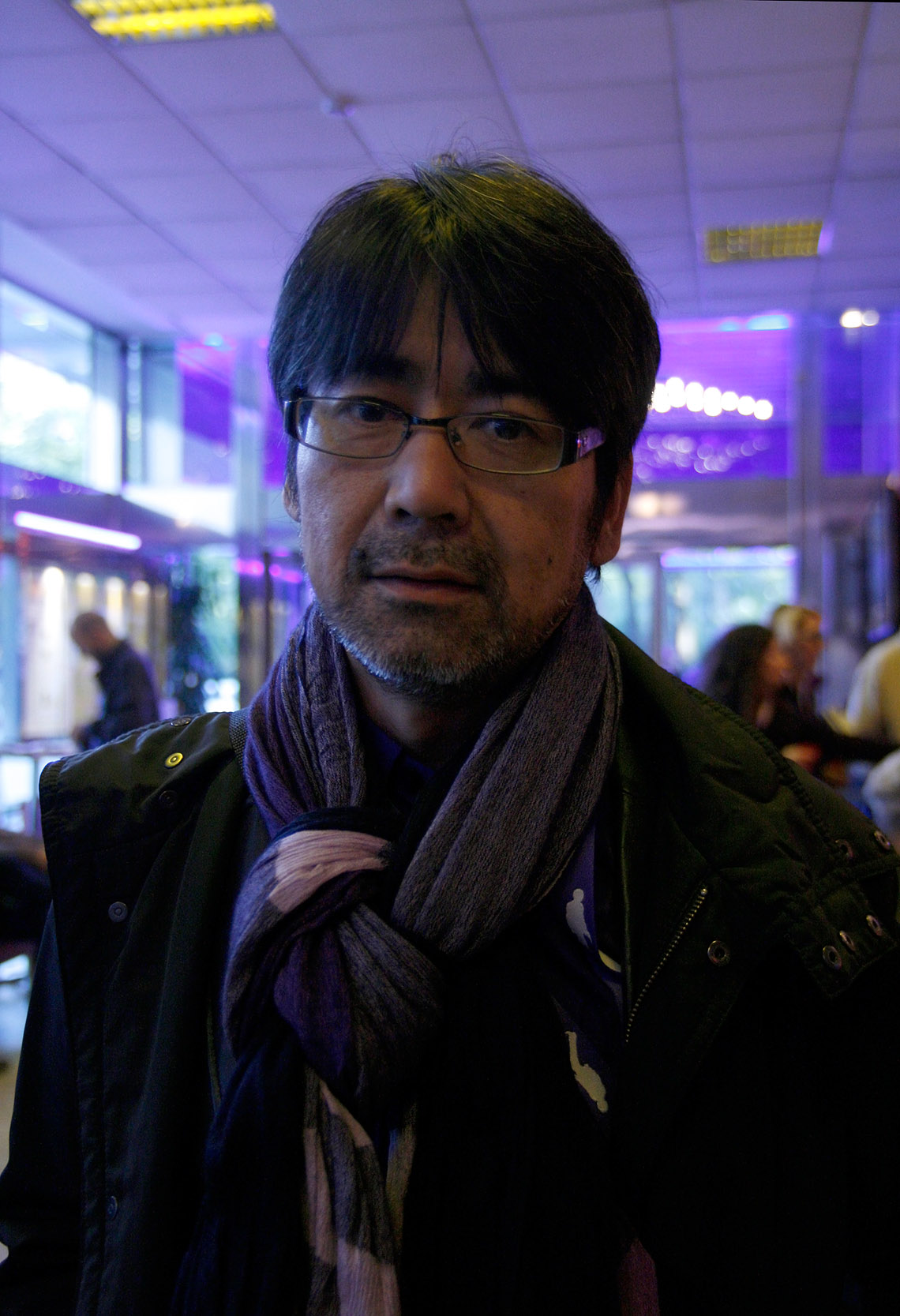
- Nobuhiro Suwa at the Vienna International Film Festival 2009
- Born: May 28, 1960 (age 66); Hiroshima, Hiroshima Prefecture, Japan
- Occupation: Film director
- Years active: 1996-present
- Known for: M/Other (1999)

Nobuhiro Suwa (諏訪 敦彦, Suwa Nobuhiro; born May 28, 1960 in Hiroshima, Hiroshima Prefecture) is a Japanese film director working in Japan and France. His directorial works and screenplays often make use of improvisation techniques. Currently, Suwa is the President of Tokyo Zokei University.

== Biography ==
Having graduated from Hiroshima Prefectural Hatsukaichi High School (located in Hatsukaichi, Hiroshima), Suwa studied at Tokyo Zokei University, under the tutorship of Nobuhiro Kawanaka. While at the college, he began working producing independent films, of which Hanasareru Gang was chosen for the Pia Film Festival. After graduating from Tokyo Zokei, Suwa began directing television documentary films, and worked with directors such as Sōgo Ishii and Masashi Yamamoto.

In 1996, his feature film directorial debut, 2/Duo (2/デュオ, 2/Dyuo) was released. Suwa's second film, M/Other, was released soon after in 1999, winning the prestigious FIPRESCI Prize at the 1999 Cannes Film Festival and being the subject of several other awards and critical acclaim, both in Japan and internationally. M/Other also won the award for best screenplay at the 50th Mainichi Film Awards. His assistant director in the film was Miwa Nishikawa.

Suwa's third feature film, H Story (starring Kō Machida), was released in March 2000. It presents itself as an autobiographical documentary on an attempt to remake Alain Resnais' Hiroshima Mon Amour, and had been noted as an audacious attempt at a Nouvelle Vague portrayal of his hometown, Hiroshima. The film is bilingual French-Japanese. Also during the same year, he guest-appeared in and co-created the Sōgo Ishii-directed samurai epic Gojoe Reisenki: GOJEI.

In 2005, he directed and wrote Un Couple Parfait (不完全なふたり, Fukanzen no Futari; a.k.a. A Perfect Couple), which featured a French cast and crew and is entirely in French. The film won the Special Prize of the Jury Award and the C.I.C.A.E. Award at the 58th Locarno Film Festival.

Later, in 2006, Suwa participated in the international omnibus film Paris, je t'aime. He directed and wrote the segment representing the 2nd arrondissement, filmed at Place des Victoires. Paris, je t'aime was the opening film of the Un Certain Regard selection at the 2006 Cannes Film Festival.

In 2009, Suwa directed jointly with Hippolyte Girardot Yuki & Nina, another French-Japanese bilingual movie which was shot in both France and Japan.

== Activism ==
In December 2023, alongside 50 other filmmakers, Nobuhiro Suwa signed an open letter published in Libération demanding a ceasefire and an end to the killing of civilians amid the 2023 Israeli invasion of the Gaza Strip, and for a humanitarian corridor into Gaza to be established for humanitarian aid, and the release of hostages.

== Directorial works ==
- Santa ga machi ni yatte kuru (16mm) (1982)
- Hanasareru GANG (8mm) (1995)
- 2/Duo (1997)
- M/Other (1999)
- Winter Oranges (co-directed with Rob Nilsson) (2000)
- H Story (2001)
- After War (segment: "A Letter from Hiroshima") (2002)
- Un couple parfait (2005)
- Paris, je t'aime (segment: "Place des Victoires") (2006)
- Yuki & Nina (co-directed with Hippolyte Girardot) (2009)
- The Lion Sleeps Tonight (2017)
- Voices in the Wind (2020)

== Television documentaries ==
- Abe Kobo ga sagashiateta jidai (1994)
- Hollywood wo Kaketa Kaiyū-itan no hito Kamiyama Sojin (1995; Higashinippon Broadcasting)

== Acting work ==
- Onoda: 10,000 Nights in the Jungle (2021)
- Seaside Serendipity (2025) as Mr. A
