= Scrinzi =

Scrinzi is a surname. Notable people with the surname include:

- Joana Scrinzi (born 1981), Austrian film editor
- Otto Scrinzi (1918–2012), Austrian neurologist, journalist and politician
