= Rusanda Panfili =

Moldovan violinist (born 1988)

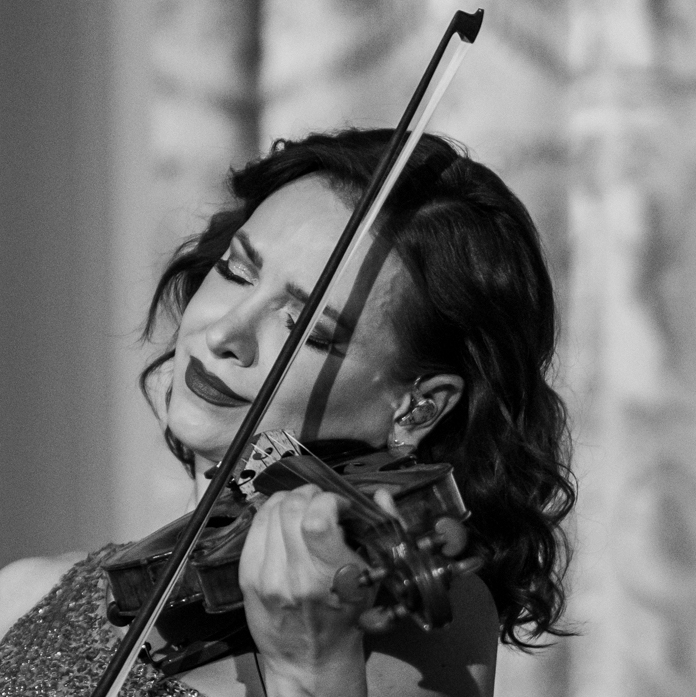
- Panfili in 2026

Background information
- Born: 11 January 1988 (age 38)
- Genres: Classical
- Occupation: Violinist
- Website: www.rusandapanfili.com

Rusanda Panfili (born 1 November 1988) is a Moldovan violinist and composer based in Austria. She has notably collaborated with Hans Zimmer, including performing on the Hans Zimmer Live tour.

== Early life ==
Panfili was born in Chișinău and began her violin studies at the George Enescu National University of Arts in Bucharest and won her first international violin competition in Italy at the age of 10. At 11, she became the youngest student admitted to the University of Music and Performing Arts Vienna, where she studied with Christian Altenburger.

== Career ==
Panfili has performed with the Jerusalem Symphony Orchestra and the National Symphony Orchestra (Mexico). She has won several international awards, including the Rodolfo Lipizer Priz, the Andrea Postacchini International Violin Competition and the Louis Spohr Competition.

She was featured soloist on Andrea Bocelli’s 2024 European and US tours.

Her violin can be heard on Hans Zimmer’s scores for The Boss Baby: Family Business, Army of Thieves and Wonder Woman 1984 and she has performed with on Hans Zimmer Live tour since its inception.

In 2025, together with her husband Johannes Winkler, she composed the music for the film Perla directed by Alexandra Makárová.

In February 2026, she performed a recital at The White House for President Donald Trump.
