= INU (band) =

Japanese punk rock band

- Origin: Osaka, Japan
- Genres: Punk rock, post-punk
- Years active: 1979–1981
- Past members: Machizō Machida; Masahiro Kitada; Naruko Nishikawa; Shin'ichi Higashiura

INU (also イヌ) was a punk band from Osaka, Japan, active from 1979 to 1981. Fronted by a teenage Kō Machida, who went by Machizō Machida at the time, the group released a single studio album, メシ喰うな! (Meshi kuuna!, "Don't Eat Food!"), in 1981. A live album was released three years later.

== History ==
=== Formation ===
Machida formed a predecessor group, Kusare Omeko (腐れおめこ), in 1977 while a high-school student in Osaka, after being inspired by the Sex Pistols. The group renamed itself INU, a romanization of the Japanese word for "dog," in 1979. In March of that year the band participated in a five-show Tokyo tour billed as "Kansai No Wave", alongside Aunt Sally, SS, Ultra Bidé and Alcohol 42%, which brought the Osaka punk scene to wider attention.

=== Meshi Kuuna! and dissolution ===
INU signed to Japan Record, a subsidiary of Tokuma Japan Communications, and released Meshi kuuna! on 1 March 1981. The recording lineup consisted of Machida on vocals, Masahiro Kitada on guitar, Naruko Nishikawa on bass and Shin'ichi Higashiura on drums. The album was praised for combining punk aggression with literary and theatrical Japanese-language lyrics, distinguishing it from more Anglicized Tokyo punk groups of the day. The band dissolved shortly after the album's release.

== Legacy ==
Machida went on to a literary career under the name Kō Machida, winning the Akutagawa Prize in 2000 for Kiregire, as well as the Tanizaki Prize, Kawabata Yasunari Prize, and Noma Literary Prize. Meshi kuuna! has been reissued several times in Japan, and received its first internationally licensed vinyl reissue, retitled Don't Eat Food!, through Mesh-Key Records in 2023. The reissue was reviewed by Maximum Rocknroll, which praised it as a "mind-bender." In 2007, Rolling Stone Japan ranked the album at number 33 on its list of the 100 greatest Japanese rock albums of all time.

== Discography ==
- Meshi Kuuna! (メシ喰うな!) — Japan Record / Tokuma Japan Communications, 1981
- If you underestimate Ushiwakamaru, I'll beat the tar out of you! (牛若丸なめとったらどついたるぞ!) — Alchemy Records, 1984
