= Joana Scrinzi =

Austrian film editor

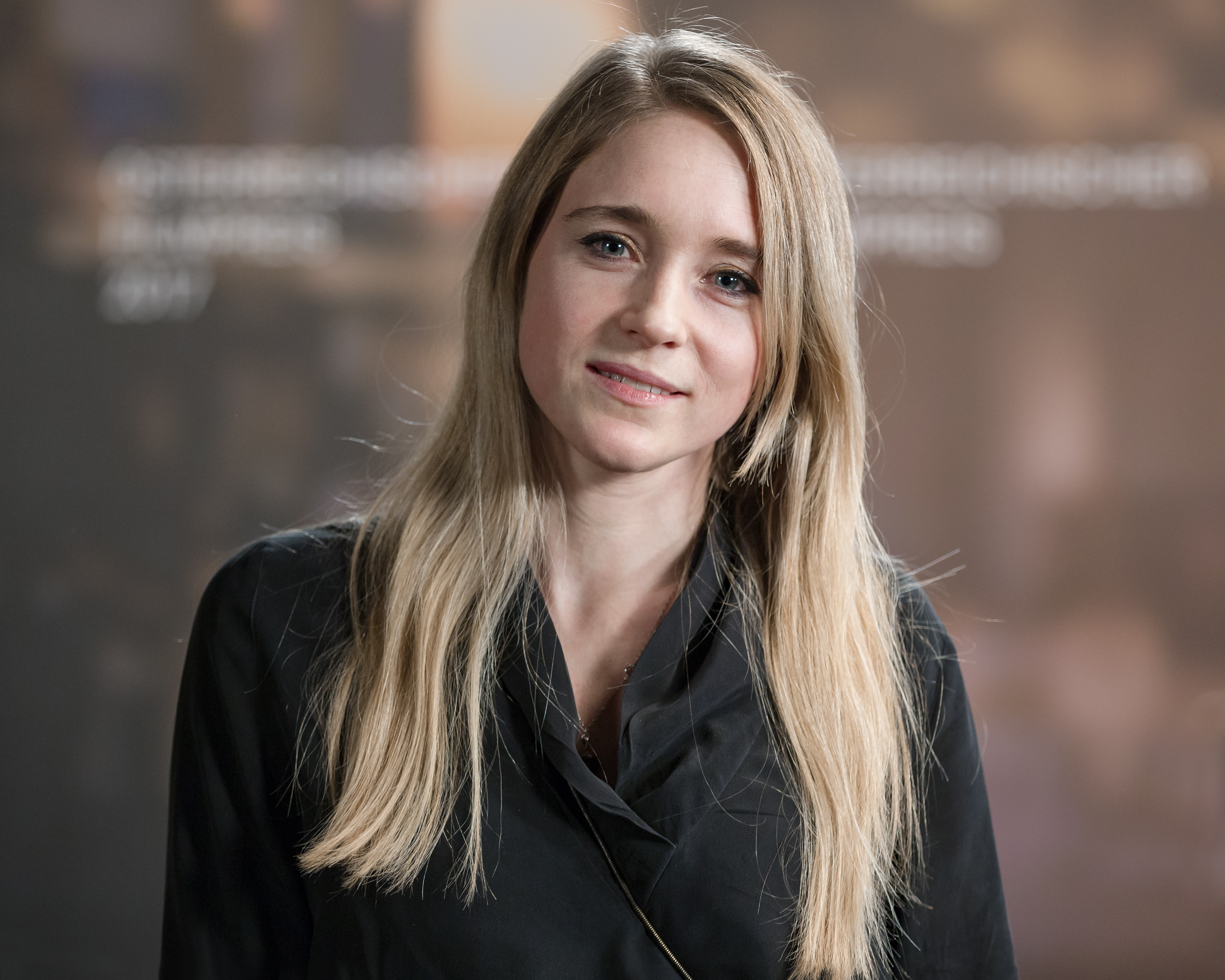
- Scrinzi at the 2017 Austrian Film Awards
- Born: 1981 (age 44–45); Salzburg, Austria
- Occupation: Film editor
- Children: 2

Joana Scrinzi (born 1981) is an Austrian film editor.

== Early life and education ==
Joana Scrinzi was born in 1981 in Salzburg, Salzburg, Austria.

After graduating from high school, Scrinzi studied ballet and dance, and then multi media art.

== Career ==
From 2004 to 2006, Scrinzi worked as an assistant editor with Karina Ressler and Oliver Neumann, among others, for productions such as Hotel, Fallen, Revanche, and Immer nie am Meer. The first full-length feature film for which she was responsible as editor was in März by director Klaus Händl, with whom she worked again for the film Tomcat (Kater) in 2016.

She edited the Slovak-Austrian co-production, Perla, directed by Alexandra Makárová, which was released in 2025.

== Memberships ==
Scrinzi is a member of the Academy of Austrian Films and the Austrian Film Editing Association.

== Personal life ==
Scrinzi married to the film director Antonin Svoboda, director of The Strange Case of Wilhelm Reich (2012), among other films. They have two children.

Svoboda worked with Scrinzi on Tomcat, as a co-producer.

== Awards and nominations ==
- 2017: Austrian Film Awards – Nominated in the Best Editor category for Tomcat
- 2018: Diagonale – Best Artistic Editing of a Documentary, for Gwendolyn and Nicht von schlechten Eltern
- 2018: Schnitt-Preis – Nominated for Bild-Kunst Schnitt Preis Dokumentarfilm, for Gwendolyn
- 2021: Diagonale – Best Artistic Editing of a Feature Film, for Fuchs im Bau

== Filmography ==
- 2008: März
- 2010: Einmal mehr als nur reden
- 2012: Outing
- 2012: Warme Gefühle
- 2012: Griffen
- 2013: CERN
- 2013: Schulden G.m.b.H.
- 2013: Fiesta auf der Müllhalde
- 2014: Was Wir Nicht Sehen
- 2014: Tough Cookies
- 2015: Drei Eier im Glas
- 2016: Tomcat
- 2017: Gwendolyn
- 2017: Cry Baby, Cry (Nicht von schlechten Eltern)
- 2020: Fuchs im Bau
- 2021: Great Freedom
- 2025: Perla
