= Simon Schwarz =

Austrian actor

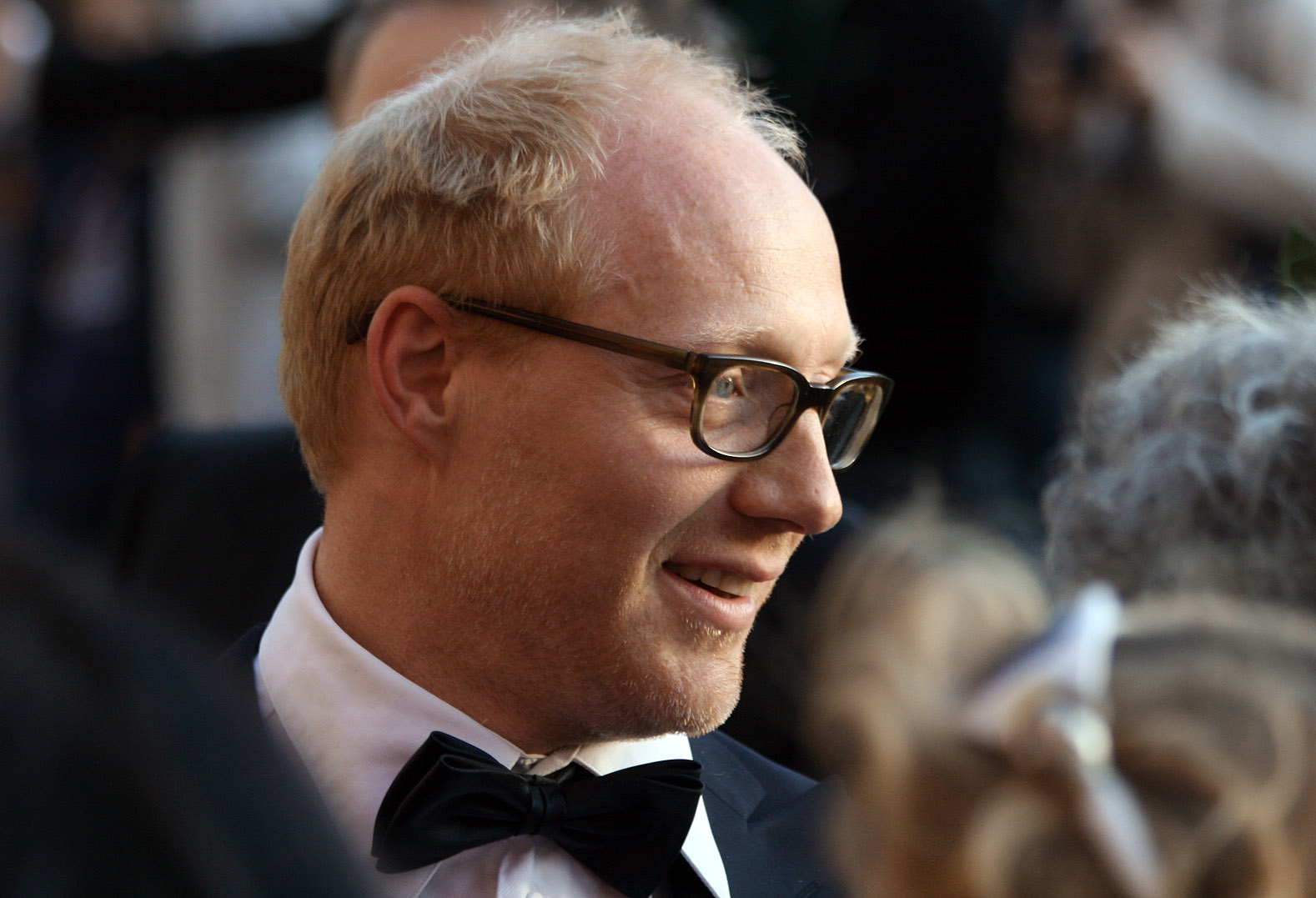
- Simon Schwarz (2012)
- Born: 10 January 1971 (age 55); Vienna, Austria
- Died: 2003
- Occupation: Actor
- Known for: Franz Eberhofer series of films

Simon Schwarz (born 10 January 1971) is an Austrian actor. He is known for his role as Chris Wegner in the medical drama series Die Eifelpraxis and as Rudi Birkenberger in the Franz Eberhofer series of crime films. Since 2019 he has been starring with Eberhofer actor Sebastian Bezzel in a documentary TV series Bezzel & Schwarz - Die Grenzgänger, in which they live and travel in a motorhome through Bavaria, Germany. He plays a lead role in the 2025 Slovak-Austrian co-production Perla.

== Early life and education ==
Simon Schwarz was born on 10 January 1971 in Vienna, Austria.

== Career ==
=== Acting ===
==== Film and TV ====
Schwarz is known for his role as the neurotic Austrian private detective Rudi Birkenberger in the very successful Franz Eberhofer series of films, opposite Sebastian Bezzel as Eberhofer, who is also a personal friend.

In 2015 he played the lead role in the Oscar-nominated short drama film Everything Will Be Okay (Alles Wird Gut), as a divorced father who decides to kidnap his own daughter. The film was directed by Patrick Vollrath, and won several awards.

Schwarz played country doctor Chris Wegner in the medical drama TV series Die Eifelpraxis, opposite German actress Rebecca Immanuel. The series, which started filming in autumn 2015, premiered on 16 September 2016 on Das Erste, with episode 15 broadcast on 15 November 2024. It was produced by UFA Fiction for ARD Degeto.

He played German Nazi diplomat Martin Luther in the award-winning 2022 film Die Wannseekonferenz (The Conference).

In 2025, he stars opposite Slovak actress Rebeka Poláková in Slovak-Austrian director Alexandra Makárová's second feature film, Perla.

=== Documentary ===
Schwarz and his friend, Eberhofer actor Sebastian Bezzel feature as themselves in a documentary TV series for BR Bezzel & Schwarz - Die Grenzgänger (Bezzel & Schwarz - The Border-crossers), in which they live and travel in a motorhome through Bavaria, Germany, over a period of six weeks. The series was launched in 2019. The fifth series was released in 2023, and another series in 2024.

==== Stage ====
Schwarz also performs live on stage. He plays opposite actor and cabaret artist Manuel Rubey in Das Restaurant.

=== Other roles and activities ===
Schwarz co-produced, along with Konstantin Seitz of Alternative Productions-Konstantin Seitz, the debut directorial feature by Alexandra Makárová, titled Crush My Heart (Zerschlag mein Herz), released in 2018.

== Personal life ==
Schwarz was previously married to actress Nana Spier; the couple had two children.

Sustainability is important to him, and he says he is aware of the environmental impact of his travel for work purposes, so tries to use the least damaging means of transport. He also advocates for a more sustainable agriculture and the preservation of cultural landscapes. As of 2024 he eats only plant-based foods at home.

== Accolades ==
Schwarz won the Max Ophüls Award as Best Young Actor in 1998.

== Selected filmography ==
Year	Title	Role	Notes
1998	The Inheritors	Lukas Lichtmeß	
2000	Bundle of Joy	Speedy	
2000	Komm, süßer Tod	Berti	
2004	Silentium	Berti	
2006	Heavyweights	Leusl-Peter	
2008	North Face	Willy Angerer	
2009	The Bone Man	Berti	
2011	Meine Schwester	Ernst Schlenzer	TV film
2013	Dampfnudelblues	Rudi Birkenberger	
2014	Winterkartoffelknödel	Rudi Birkenberger	
2015	Everything Will Be Okay	Michael Baumgartner	
2015–present	Die Eifelpraxis	Dr Chris Wegner	
2016	Die Kunst des Krieges	Inkasso-Heinzi	TV series episode
2016	Schweinskopf al dente (Film)	Rudi Birkenberger	
2017	Grießnockerlaffäre	Rudi Birkenberger	
2018	Klassentreffen 1.0	Ole	
2018	Sauerkrautkoma	Rudi Birkenberger	
2019	Leberkäsjunkie	Rudi Birkenberger	
2019	Caviar	Ferdinand	
2021	Kaiserschmarrndrama	Rudi Birkenberger	
2022	Die Wannseekonferenz	Martin Luther	English title: The Conference
2022	Guglhupfgeschwader	Rudi Birkenberger	
2023	Rehragout-Rendezvous	Rudi Birkenberger	
2025	Perla	Josef	
