= Kō Machida =

Japanese writer, musician, and actor (born 1962)

Machida Kō
- 町田康
- Born: Machida Yasushi; 15 January 1962 (age 64); Sakai, Osaka Prefecture, Japan
- Occupations: Author, punk rock singer, poet, actor
- Writing career
- Pen name: Machida Machizō
- Notable works: Kūge; Gussun Daikoku; Kiregire
- Notable awards: Bunkamura Deux Magots Literary Award, Akutagawa Prize, Tanizaki Prize
- Website: https://www.machidakou.com/

Machida Kō (町田 康, Machida Kō; born Machida Yasushi on 15 January 1962) is a Japanese author, punk rock singer, poet, and actor.

== History ==
In 1977, while attending Osaka Prefectural Imamiya High School, Machida started his first band, Kusare Omeko (腐れおめこ; lit. 'Rotten cunt'), with classmates. In 1978, he created a second, punk rock-based band, INU (meaning "dog" in Japanese), for which he used the stage name Machida Machizō (町田町蔵). Their work was first published in a compilation, titled DokkriRecord, released in 1980, with the music of five other bands. Machida worked for Seibu Restaurant Co. Ltd for one month between March and April 1980 before quitting and in March 1981, INU released their first album, Meshi Kuuna! (メシ喰うな！; lit. 'Don't eat!' or 'Get away from the food!'). INU split up a few months later in August 1981.

In January 1982, Machida founded another band, FUNA, which lasted until November without any albums. He moved to Tokyo in 1983, creating People's Olympic Show (人民オリンピックショー) the same year and Shifukudan (至福団) in 1986. Both bands were disbanded in 1987, with Machida going on a three-year hiatus. He made his return to the music industry in 1990, performing at Club Quattro in Shibuya. In 1991, he founded Machida Machizō+Kitazawagumi (北澤組), which first lasted until 1995, when Machido replaced the backup band with Machida Machizō Unit (町田町蔵ユニット), later renamed THE GLORY, itself disbanded in 1996 after one album, when Machido reunited with Kitazawagumi before another split in 1997. His albums received moderate critical acclaim limited commercial success. It was during this last year Machido adopted the name Kō, which is an alternate reading of his birth name.

His first literary work, Kūge, was published in 1992, and included a selection of his poems. His first novel, Gussun Daikoku, was published in 1996. It earned him the Bunkamura Deux Magots Literary Award. His unique style of story-telling marked by nonsense, irreverence, and slapstick is influenced by Kamigata (Kansai) Rakugo and Jidaigeki (samurai dramas). Some critics link him to self-destructive 'I Novel' writers of the pre-World War II era such as Kamura Isota and Chikamatsu Shūkō. Oda Sakunosuke is also cited as one of his influences.

He won the 123rd Akutagawa Prize with Kiregire ("Shreds") in 2000 and the Tanizaki Prize with Kokuhaku ("Confession") in 2005.

On 14 June 2007, Machida got into an argument with his friend and rock musician Tomoyasu Hotei about a band they planned on forming together. There was a physical altercation and after learning that his injuries would take two weeks to heal, Machida filed a police report on 18 June. Hotei was ordered to pay a fine of 300,000 yen on 1 October.

Machida returned to making music concurrent to his literary career in 2002, producing several albums until 2020, though he continued to make frequent live appearances with prominent bands. Since 2023, Machida has taught as a specially appointed literature professor at the Department of Letters of Musashino University.

== Discography ==
Albums

- Meshi Kuuna! by Inu (1981)
- Ushiwakamaru Nametottara Dotsuitaru Zo by Inu (Published in 1984, recorded in 1979)
- Doterai Yatsura by Machida Machizo from Shifuku Dan (1986)
- Hona, Donaisee Iune by Machida Machizo (1987)
- Harafuri by Machida Machizo + Kitazawa Gumi (1992)
- Chūshajō no Yohane by Machida Machizo + Kitazawa Gumi (1994)
- Dōnikanaru by Machida Ko + The Glory (1995)
- Nōnai Shuffle Kakumei by Machida Ko (1997)
- Miracle Young by Miracle Young (2003)
- Machida Kō Group Live 2004 Oct 6th by Machida Ko Group (2004)

Singles

- Kokoro no Unitto by Machi Tai (2002)

== Selected filmography ==
He played major roles in the following films.

- Burst City directed by Gakuryū Ishii (1982)
- Endless Waltz directed by Kōji Wakamatsu (1995)
- H Story directed by Nobuhiro Suwa (2001)
- Goldfish directed by Shin'ichi Fujinuma (2023)

== Selected literary works ==
- Kūge (供花) - His debut poem selection 1992
- Kussun Daikoku (くっすん大黒) - Bunkamura Deux Magots Literary Award 1996
- Ore, Nanshin Shite (俺、南進して) 1999 co-authored with Nobuyoshi Araki
- Shreds (切れ切れ) - Akutagawa Prize 2000
- Gonge no Odoriko (権現の踊り子) - Kawabata Yasunari Literary Award 2003
- Confession (告白) - Tanizaki Prize 2005
