= Vienna International Film Festival =

Annual film festival held in Vienna, Austria

- Official poster
- Location: Vienna, Austria
- Founded: 1960; 65 years ago
- Most recent: 2025
- Awards: Vienna Film Award
- Festival date: Opening: 16 October 2025; Closing: 28 October 2025
- Language: International
- Website: Viennale

63rd
- 64th Viennale 62nd Viennale

The Vienna International Film Festival, or Viennale, is a film festival taking place every October since 1960 in Vienna, Austria. The average number of visitors is about 75,000. Traditional cinema venues are Gartenbaukino, Urania, Metro-Kino, Filmmuseum and Stadtkino. At the end of the festival, the Vienna Film Prize is awarded.

== History ==
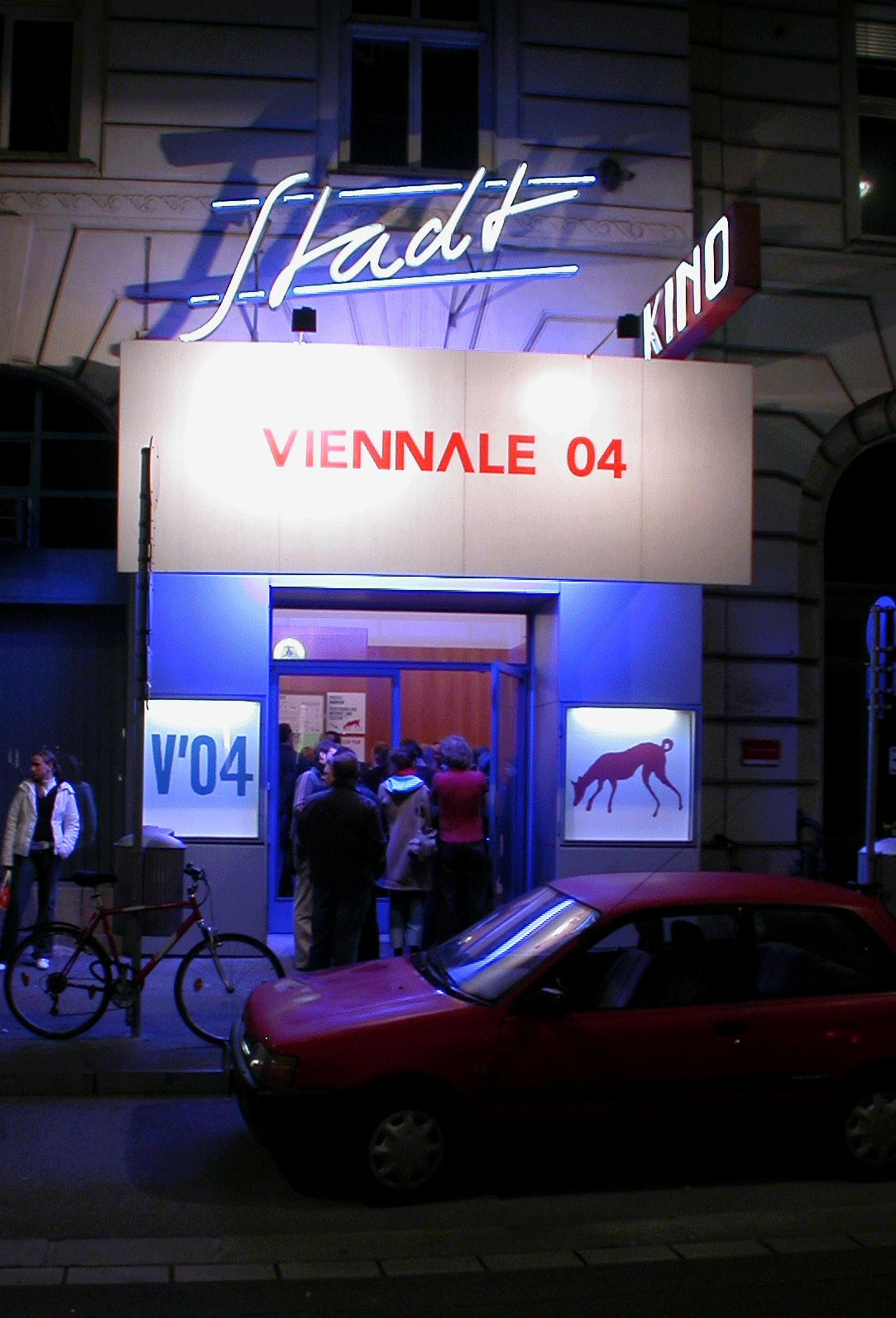
The Stadtkino during the Viennale 2004

The festival features a collection of new films from all over the world, as well as national and international premieres. Apart from new feature films in various film genres, the festival focuses on documentary films, short films, experimental films and crossover productions. Together with the Austrian Film Museum, a historical retrospective is organized every year, as well as special programs, tributes and homages to international institutions and individuals.

During the festival, the Fipresci Prize is awarded by international film critics. Another prize is awarded by the readers of the Austrian newspaper Der Standard.

The program of the festival includes galas, special events and celebrations, as well as discussions and meetings between international guests and local visitors.

The Vienna International Film Festival is different from the Film Festival Rathausplatz in central Vienna, which exclusively shows music films daily throughout August.

== Awards ==
- Vienna Film Award
- FIPRESCI Prize
- Standard Readers' Jury Award
- Erste Bank Film Award

== Editions ==
The 63rd edition of the festival took place from 16 to 28 October, 2025. From this edition a new programme, called 'Young Audience Screening' was introduced.

The following awards were winners of awards at the festival:

- Vienna Film Award for Best Austrian Film: Perla – Alexandra Makárová (Austria, Slovakia)
- Special Jury Award: Girls & Gods – Arash T. Riahi and Verena Soltiz (Austria, Switzerland)
- Erste Bank MehrWERT Award:
  - White Snail – Elsa Kremser, Levin Peter (Austria, Germany)
  - Rojo Žalia Blau – Viktoria Schmid (Austria) (short film)
- Der Standard Reader Jury Viennale Award: Late Fame – Kent Jones (USA)
- FIPRESCI Award: BLKNWS: Terms & Conditions – Kahlil Joseph (USA, Ghana)
