= Johannes Winkler (composer) =

Musician based in Vienna

Johannes Winkler is a film music composer, multi-instrumentalist, and music producer based in Vienna, Austria. Since 2016, he has frequently collaborated with Canadian musician Edo Van Breemen.

== Early life and education ==
Johannes Winkler started his musical education at the age of eight, when he started studying flute, piano, percussion, violin, and later electronic music and analog synthesisers.

He earned a Master's Degree with distinction from the University of Music and Performing Arts Vienna, where he specialised in jazz and classical piano, composition, and sound engineering.

== Career ==
Winkler and his frequent collaborator since 2016 Edo Van Breemen composed the music for the 2018 Netflix TV series Dogs.

For their work on the film Handle With Care: The Legend of the Notic Streetball Crew, Van Breemen and Winkler received a Canadian Screen Award nomination for Best Original Music in a Documentary at the 11th Canadian Screen Awards in 2023.

He worked with Slovak-Austrian filmmaker Alexandra Makárová, along with Rusanda Panfili, to compose the music for Makárová's 2025 film Perla. They started working on the music two years before filming began.

== Personal life ==
Winkler lives in Vienna, Austria.
