= Rita Falk =

German author

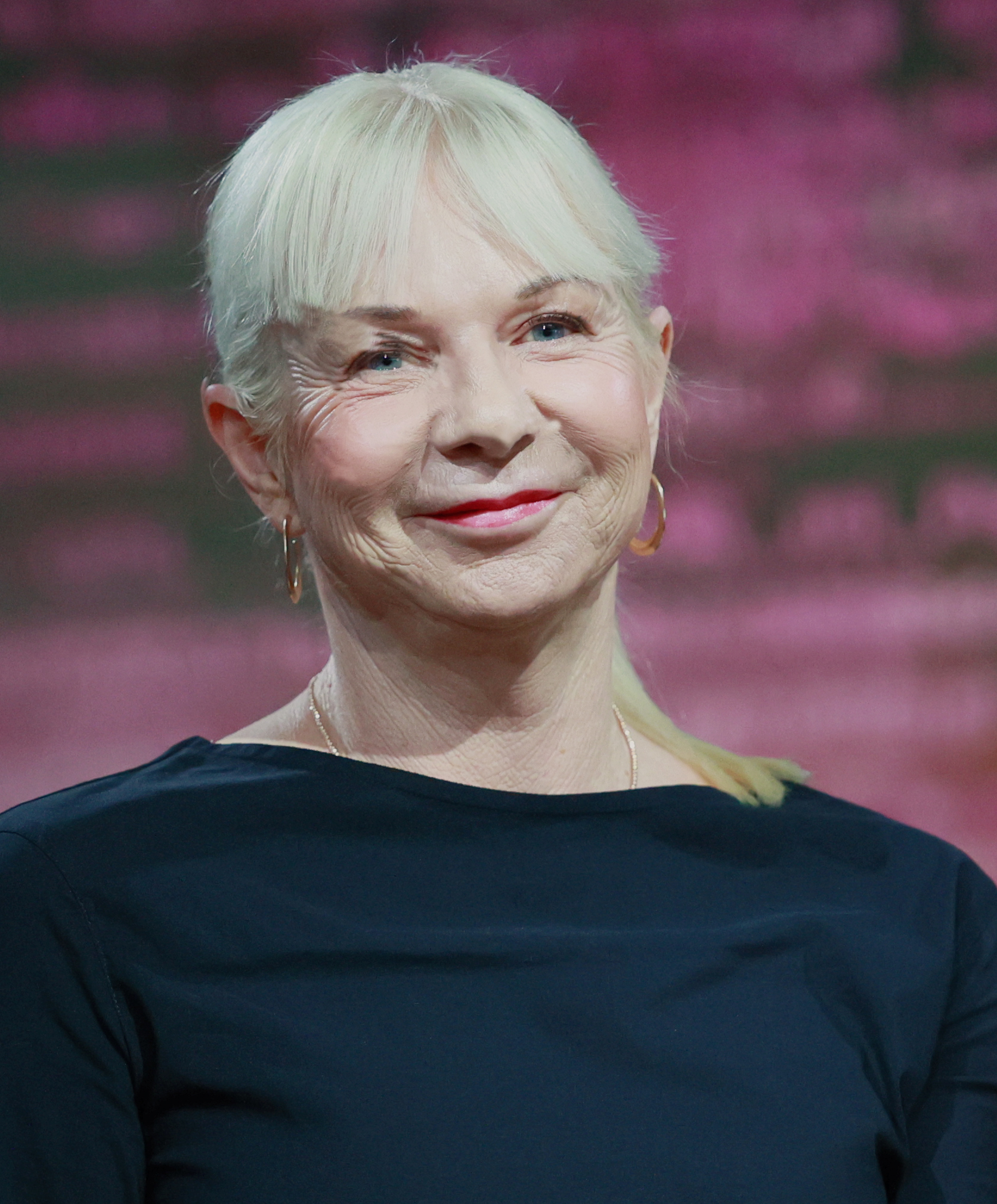
Rita Falk at Frankfurter Buchmesse 2023

Rita Falk (born 30 May 1964) is a German writer. She is especially known for her crime fiction featuring village policeman Franz Eberhofer, which has spawned many film adaptations.

== Early life and education ==
Rita Falk was born in Oberammergau, Bavaria, Germany, on 30 May 1964.

She lived at her place of birth until age eight, then moved with her parents first for one year to Munich, then to Landshut, where she attended the classical grammar school.

== Career ==
Falk was working as an office clerk until her breakthrough as an author.

She achieved fame through her "provincial crime fiction" centered on village policeman Franz Eberhofer, set in the fictitious town of Niederkaltenkirchen. In her eyes the location of the film adaptations, the municipality of Frontenhausen, comes closest to it. Next to criminal cases the series also focuses on Franz' private life and relationships. These include his grandmother (Oma Eberhofer), his father, his girl-friend Susi, his brother Leopold and his best friend Rudi Birkenberger.

Following three volumes of provincial crime fiction with a mode of story-telling strongly influenced by Bavarian dialect, Falk presented her first family novel, Hannes, in 2012. Several books of both genres have been published since.

Her debut novel, Winterkartoffelknödel (2010), the first volume of the Eberhofer series – as well as the second and third, Dampfnudelblues (2011), and Schweinskopf al dente (2011) – reached no. 6 on the Spiegel bestseller list (hardcover fiction). With the fifth instalment, Sauerkrautkoma (2013), Rita Falk reached no. 1 for the first time. The following volumes of the series hit first place on the Spiegel bestseller list (paperback fiction) as well.

== Adaptations ==
=== Film ===
Several films based on the Eberhofer series, starring German actor Sebastian Bezzel as Bavarian policeman Franz Eberhofer and Austrian actor Simon Schwarz as Bavarian private detective Rudi Birkenberger have been made, including Dampfnudelblues (2015) and Leberkäsjunkie (2019).

- Since 2013: Eberhofer crime film series includes:
1. Dampfnudelblues, 2013
2. Winterkartoffelknödel, 2014
3. Schweinskopf al dente, 2016
4. Grießnockerlaffäre, 2017
5. Sauerkrautkoma, 2018
6. Leberkäsjunkie, 2019
7. Kaiserschmarrndrama, 2021
8. Guglhupfgeschwader, 2022
9. Rehragout-Rendezvous, 2023
- 2021: Hannes

=== Podcast ===
From September to December 2021, Falk appeared weekly in the official podcast on the Franz Eberhofer series, Radio Niederkaltenkirchen – Der Eberhofer-Podcast, which was hosted by Christian Tramitz, narrator of the audio versions of the Eberhofer provincial criminal fiction, and Florian Wagner. In various sections, guessing games and prank calls the podcast offers behind-the-scenes insights into Falk's stories. Christian Tramitz and Florian Wagner in the podcast also talk with guests from the Eberhofer cosmos, the team of the movies and police officers.

=== Legacy ===
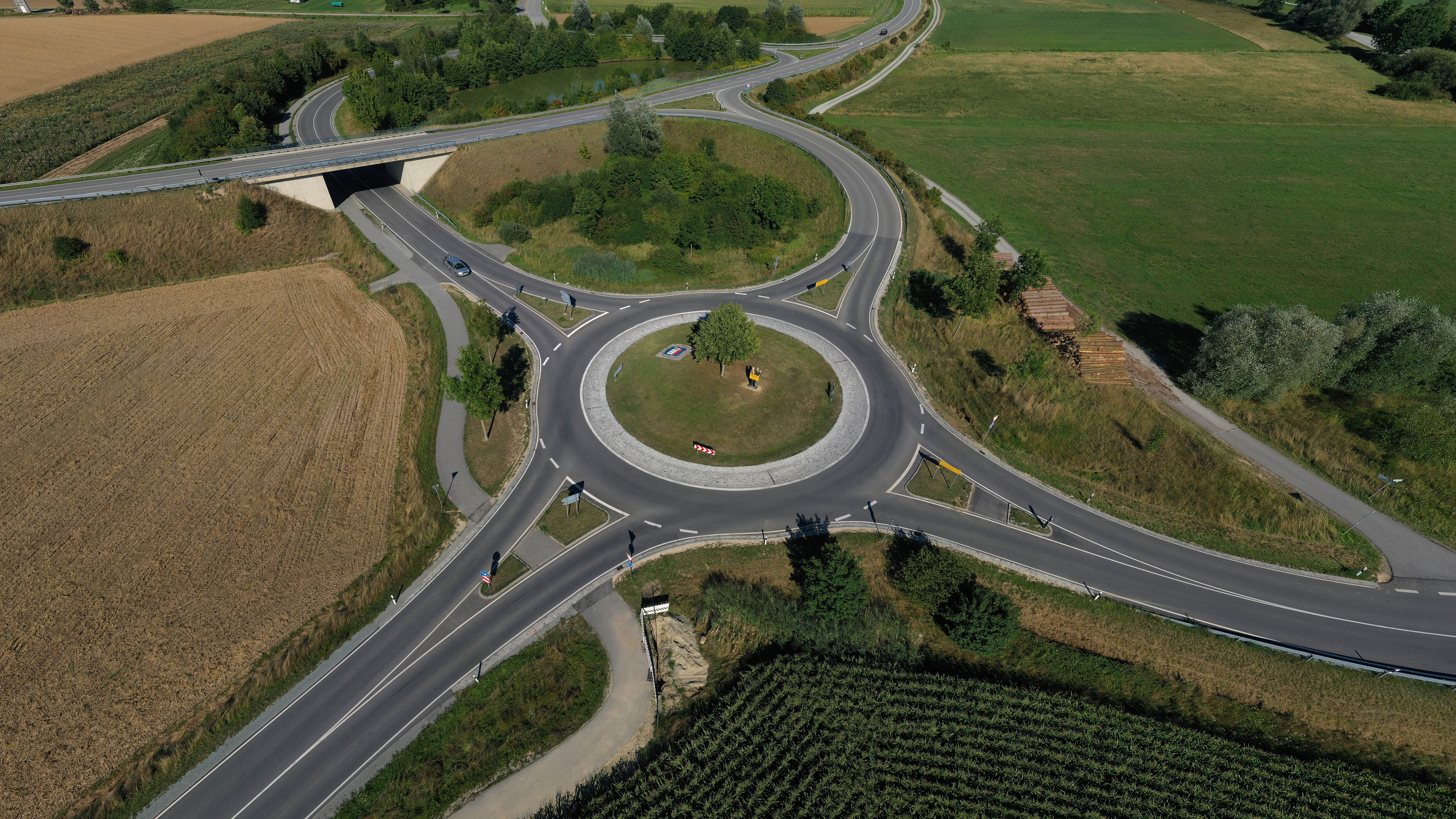
Franz Eberhofer roundabout

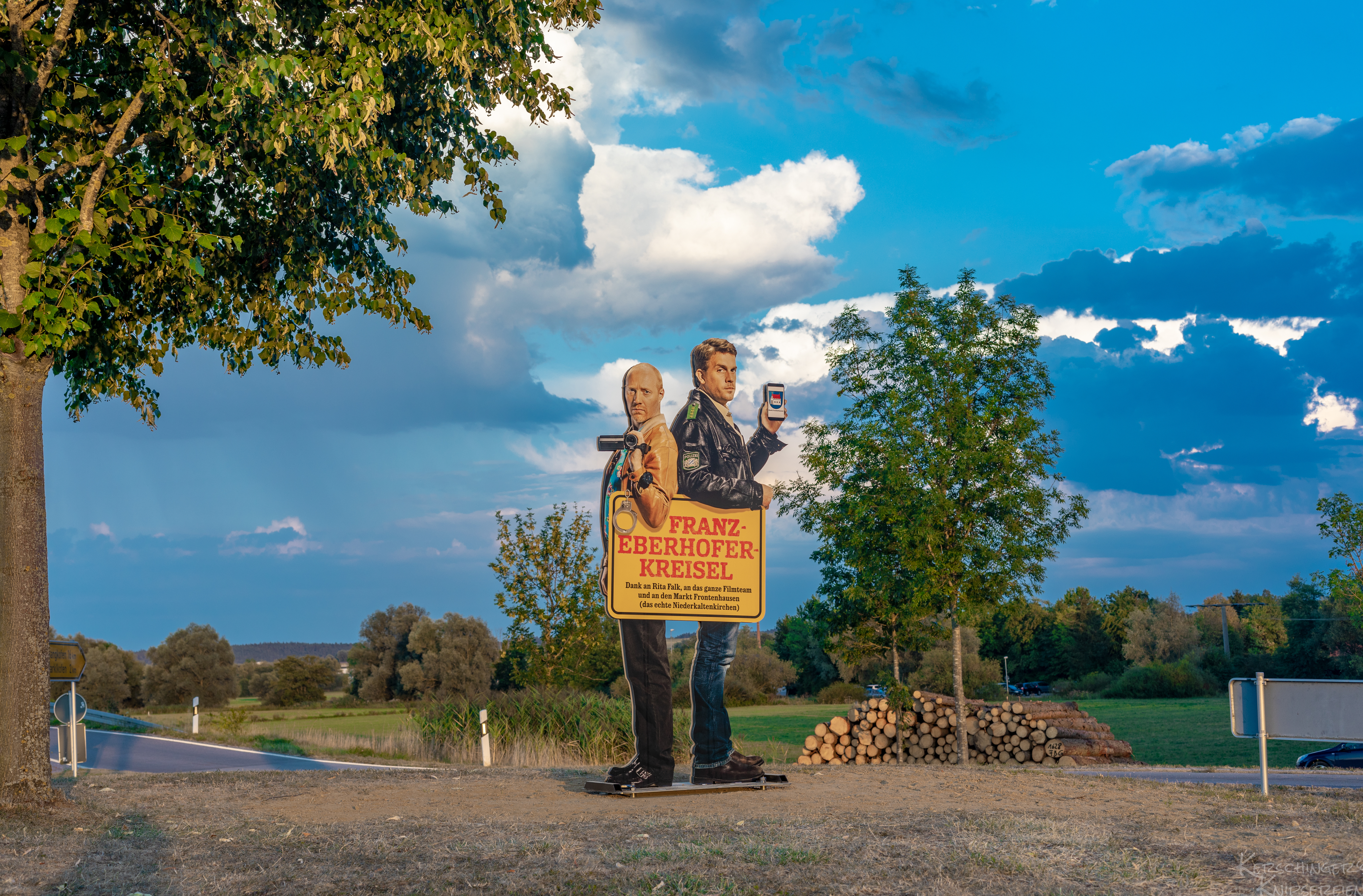
Image on the roundabout

The roundabout north of the municipality of Frontenhausen, which features in the film version of the Eberhofer crime stories, has officially been named "Franz Eberhofer roundabout" since 8 August 2018.

== Awards ==
- 2019: Bayerische Verfassungsmedaille in silver
- 2023: Bavarian Order of Merit
- 2023: Österreichischer Krimipreis
- 2023: Kulturpreis Bayern

== Personal life ==
The author lived in Munich with her second husband, former policeman Robert Falk, who died 2 July 2020 age 60. She has three adult children.

As of October 2023 Falk was in a relationship again, her new partner being an entrepreneur from the Allgäu, who has been a long-time friend.

== Partial bibliography ==
=== Franz Eberhofer series (provincial criminal fiction) ===
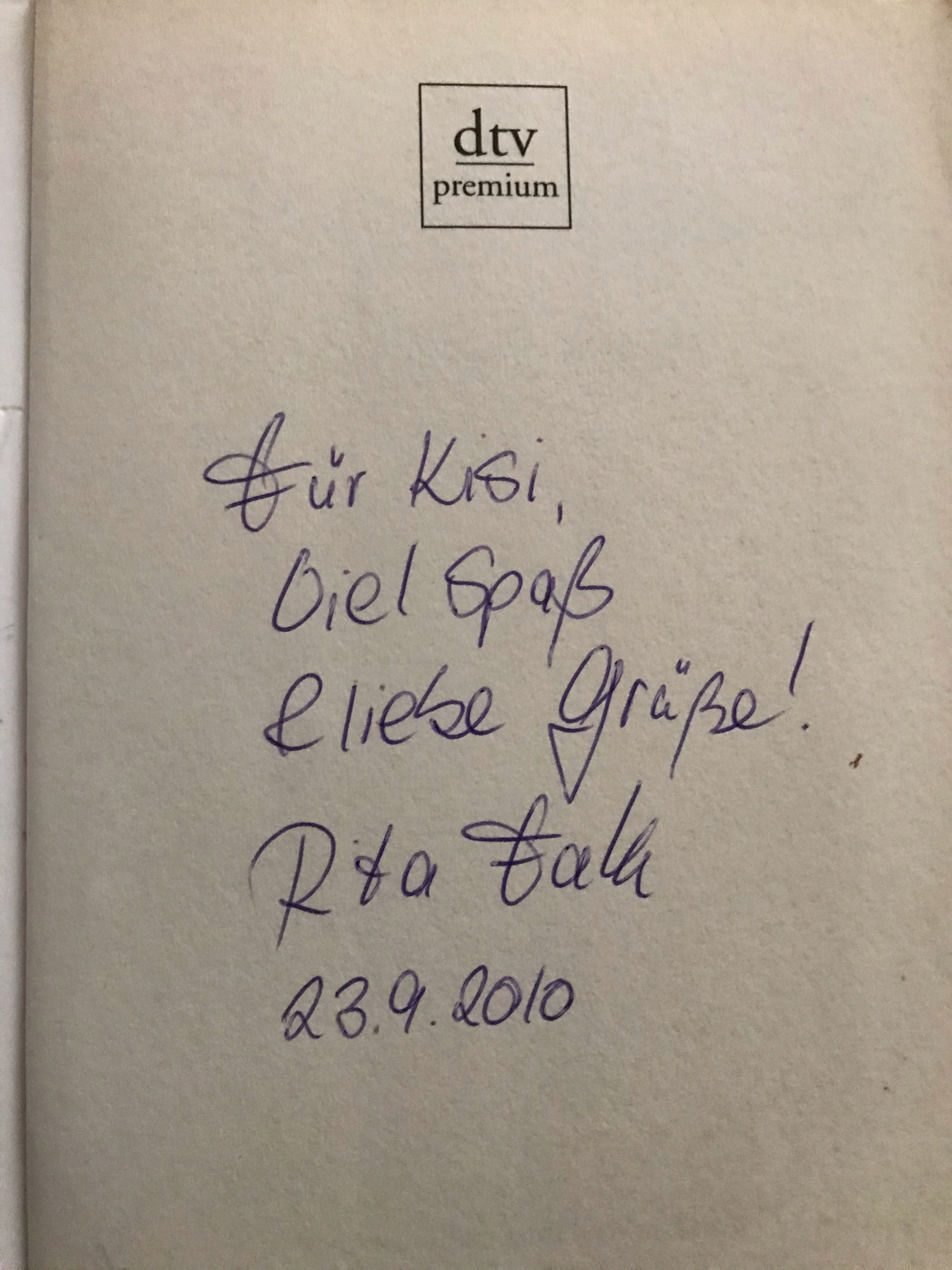
Dedication and signature in Falk's debut novel Winterkartoffelknödel

1. Winterkartoffelknödel. Novel. Deutscher Taschenbuch Verlag, dtv premium, 2010, ISBN 978-3-423-24810-5.
2. Dampfnudelblues. Novel. dtv premium, 2011, ISBN 978-3-423-24850-1.
3. Schweinskopf al dente. Novel. dtv premium, 2011, ISBN 978-3-423-24892-1.
4. Grießnockerlaffäre. Novel. dtv premium, 2012, ISBN 978-3-423-24942-3.
5. Sauerkrautkoma. Novel. dtv premium, 2013, ISBN 978-3-423-24987-4.
6. Zwetschgendatschikomplott. Novel, dtv premium, Munich 2015, ISBN 978-3-423-26044-2.
7. Leberkäsjunkie. Novel. dtv premium, Munich 2016, ISBN 978-3-423-26085-5.
8. Weißwurstconnection. Novel. dtv premium, Munich 2016, ISBN 978-3-423-26127-2.
9. Kaiserschmarrndrama. Novel. dtv premium, Munich 2018, ISBN 978-3-423-26192-0.
10. Guglhupfgeschwader. Novel. dtv premium, Munich 2019, ISBN 978-3-423-26231-6.
11. Rehragout-Rendezvous. Novel. dtv premium, Munich 2021, ISBN 978-3-423-26273-6.
12. Steckerlfischfiasko. Novel. dtv premium, Munich 2023, ISBN 978-3-423-26377-1.

=== Additional works ===
- Knödel-Blues. Oma Eberhofers bayerisches Provinz-Kochbuch. Christian Verlag, Munich 2014, ISBN 978-3-86244-127-3. (Cookbook)
- Arnika und Bohnerwachs. Oma Eberhofers bewährtes Wissen für Haushalt und Küche. Christian Verlag, Munich 2013, ISBN 978-3-86244-249-2. (Guidebook)
- Eberhofer, zefix! Geschichten vom Franzl. dtv, Munich 2018, ISBN 978-3-423-28991-7. (Stories)

=== Family novels ===
- Hannes. Novel. dtv premium, 2012, ISBN 978-3-423-28001-3.
- Funkenflieger. Novel. dtv premium, 2014, ISBN 978-3-423-26019-0.

== Audio books ==
=== Franz-Eberhofer series ===
- 2010: Winterkartoffelknödel. Read by Christian Tramitz, Der Audio Verlag (DAV), Berlin, abbreviated version, as audio file download or 4 CDs (303 min), ISBN 978-3-89813-991-5.
- 2011: Dampfnudelblues. Read by Christian Tramitz, Der Audio Verlag (DAV), Berlin, abbreviated version, as audio file download or 4 CDs (319 min), ISBN 978-3-86231-045-6.
- 2011: Schweinskopf al dente. Read by Christian Tramitz, Der Audio Verlag (DAV), Berlin, abbreviated version, as audio file download or 4 CDs (320 min), ISBN 978-3-86231-104-0.
- 2012: Grießnockerlaffäre. Read by Christian Tramitz, Der Audio Verlag (DAV), Berlin, unabridged version, as audio file download or 5 CDs (397 min), ISBN 978-3-86231-204-7.
- 2013: Die große Franz-Eberhofer-Box. Read by Christian Tramitz, Der Audio Verlag (DAV), Berlin, abbreviated version, 12 CDs (926 min), ISBN 978-3-86231-262-7.
- 2013: Sauerkrautkoma. Read by Christian Tramitz, Der Audio Verlag (DAV), Berlin, unabridged version, as audio file download or 6 CDs (422 min), ISBN 978-3-86231-307-5.
- 2014: Winterkartoffelknödel. Read by Christian Tramitz, Der Audio Verlag (DAV), Berlin, abbreviated version, 1 mp3 CD (353 min), ISBN 978-3-86231-360-0.
- 2014: Dampfnudelblues. Read by Christian Tramitz, Der Audio Verlag (DAV), Berlin, abbreviated version, 1 mp3 CD (319 min), ISBN 978-3-86231-429-4.
- 2014: Winterkartoffelknödel (Film audio drama). With Sebastian Bezzel, Lisa Maria Potthoff, Simon Schwarz, u.v.a, Der Audio Verlag (DAV), Berlin, Audio drama, as audio file download or 1 CD (78 min), ISBN 978-3-86231-467-6.
- 2015: Zwetschgendatschikomplott. Read by Christian Tramitz, Der Audio Verlag (DAV), Berlin, unabridged version, as audio file download or 6 CDs (480 min), ISBN 978-3-86231-417-1.
- 2015: Schweinskopf al dente. Read by Christian Tramitz, Der Audio Verlag (DAV), Berlin, abbreviated version, 1 mp3 CD (304 min), ISBN 978-3-86231-481-2.
- 2015: Grießnockerlaffäre. Read by Christian Tramitz, Der Audio Verlag (DAV), Berlin, unabridged version, 1 mp3 CD (397 min), ISBN 978-3-86231-584-0.
- 2016: Leberkäsjunkie. Read by Christian Tramitz, Der Audio Verlag (DAV), Berlin, unabridged version, as audio file download or 7 CDs (554 min), ISBN 978-3-86231-541-3.
- 2016: Schweinskopf al dente (Film audio drama). With Sebastian Bezzel, Simon Schwarz, u. v. a., Der Audio Verlag (DAV), Berlin, Audio drama, as audio file download or 1 CD (80 min), ISBN 978-3-86231-816-2.
- 2016: Weißwurstconnection. Read by Christian Tramitz, Der Audio Verlag (DAV), Berlin, unabridged version, as audio file download or 7 CDs (553 min), ISBN 978-3-86231-821-6.
- 2017: Grießnockerlaffäre (Film audio drama). With Sebastian Bezzel, Lisa Maria Potthoff, Simon Schwarz, Der Audio Verlag (DAV), Berlin, Audio drama, as audio file download or 1 CD (87 min), ISBN 978-3-7424-0244-8.
- 2018: Kaiserschmarrndrama. Read by Christian Tramitz, Der Audio Verlag (DAV), Berlin, unabridged version, as audio file download or 6 CDs (474 min), ISBN 978-3-7424-0452-7.
- 2018: Die große Franz-Eberhofer-Box 2. Read by Christian Tramitz, Der Audio Verlag (DAV), Berlin, unabridged version, 17 CDs (1286 min), ISBN 978-3-7424-0381-0.
- 2018: Eberhofer, zefix! Read by Christian Tramitz, Der Audio Verlag (DAV), Berlin, unabridged version, 1 CD (70 min), ISBN 978-3-7424-0757-3.
- 2019: Guglhupfgeschwader. Read by Christian Tramitz, Der Audio Verlag (DAV), Berlin, unabridged version, 6 CDs (489 min), ISBN 978-3-7424-1120-4.
- 2019: Leberkäsjunkie (Film audio drama). With Sebastian Bezzel, Lisa Maria Potthoff, Simon Schwarz, Der Audio Verlag (DAV), Berlin, Audio drama, as audio file download or 2 CDs (94 min), ISBN 978-3-7424-1158-7.
- 2020: Die große Franz-Eberhofer-Box 3. Read by Christian Tramitz, Der Audio Verlag (DAV), Berlin, unabridged version, 2 mp3-CDs (1524 min), ISBN 978-3-7424-1832-6.
- 2021: Kaiserschmarrndrama (Film audio drama). With Sebastian Bezzel, Lisa Maria Potthoff, Simon Schwarz, Der Audio Verlag (DAV), Berlin, Audio drama, as audio file download or 2 CDs (96 min), ISBN 978-3-7424-1622-3.
- 2021: Rehragout-Rendezvous. Read by Christian Tramitz, Der Audio Verlag (DAV), Berlin, unabridged version, 6 CDs (483 min), ISBN 978-3-7424-1667-4.

=== Other audio books ===
- 2012: Hannes. Read by Johannes Raspe, Der Audio Verlag (DAV), Berlin, 2012, Reading, as audio file download or 4 CDs (270 min), ISBN 978-3-86231-171-2.
- 2014: Funkenflieger. Read by Johannes Raspe, Der Audio Verlag (DAV), Berlin, 2014, Reading, as audio file download or 6 CDs (480 min), ISBN 978-3-86231-380-8.
