= H Story =

2001 film

- DVD cover
- Directed by: Nobuhiro Suwa
- Written by: Nobuhiro Suwa
- Produced by: Takenori Sentô
- Starring: Béatrice Dalle
- Cinematography: Caroline Champetier
- Edited by: Nobuhiro Suwa
- Distributed by: Tokyo Theatres
- Release date: 17 October 2001 (Cannes)
- Running time: 111 minutes
- Country: Japan
- Language: Japanese
- Box office: $55,000

H Story is a 2001 Japanese drama film by writer-director Nobuhiro Suwa. It was screened in the Un Certain Regard section at the 2001 Cannes Film Festival. It is an autobiographical docufiction about an attempt to remake Alain Resnais' 1959 film Hiroshima Mon Amour.

== Cast ==
- Béatrice Dalle as The actress
- Kou Machida as The writer
- Hiroaki Umano as The actor
- Nobuhiro Suwa as himself
- Caroline Champetier as herself
- Michiko Yoshitake as herself
- Motoko Suhama as herself
