= Perla (film) =

2025 Australian-Slovak film

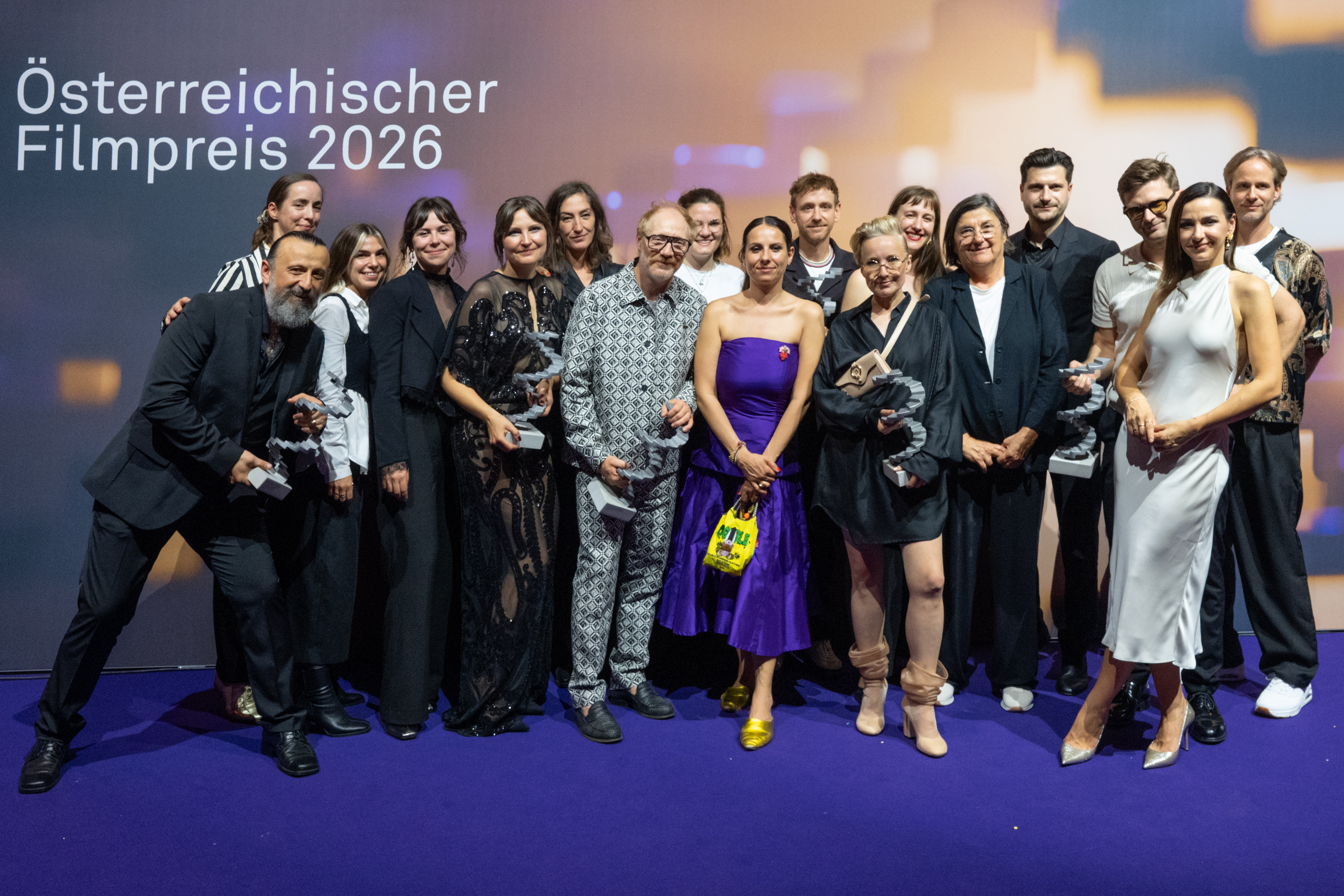
- Perla actors and film crew in 2026
- Directed by: Alexandra Makárová
- Written by: Alexandra Makárová
- Produced by: Arash T. Riahi; Sabine Gruber
- Starring: Rebeka Poláková; Simon Schwarz; Noel Czuczor; Carmen Diego
- Cinematography: Georg Weiss
- Edited by: Joana Scrinzi
- Music by: Johannes Winkler and Rusanda Panfili
- Production companies: Golden Girls Film; Hailstone
- Release dates: 2 March 2025 (Rotterdam); 24 July 2025 (Austria and Slovakia)
- Running time: 110 minutes
- Countries: Austria, Slovakia
- Languages: Slovak; German

Perla is a 2025 drama film written and directed by Alexandra Makárová, starring Rebeka Poláková, Simon Schwarz, Noel Czuczor, and Carmen Diego.

== Synopsis ==
The eponymous protagonist, Perla, is an artist who escaped Czechoslovakia some time after the Soviet invasion in 1968, while pregnant with her daughter. As a single mother in Vienna, she meets and marries Josef, who adores her and becomes involved with parenting her daughter Julia. Out of the blue she receives a phone call from her former lover and Julia's father, Andrej, who has just been released from prison in Czechoslovakia, around 1981. He wants to see his daughter, and so, after initially rebuffing him, she, Josef, and Julia undertake the journey.

== Cast ==
- Rebeka Poláková as Perla Adamova
- Simon Schwarz as Josef Hoffmann
- Noel Czuczor as Andrej
- Carmen Diego as Julia
- Hilde Dalik as Claudia
- Ivan Romancík as Julius
- Zuzana Konecná as Lenka
- Frantisek Beles as Vojtech
- Ingrid Timková as Kovácová
- Ivan Sándora as Receptionist
- Bence Hégli as Bell Boy
- Asztalos Oliver

== Production ==
=== Background and themes ===
The inspiration for the story was Makárová's mother, who was a Slovak artist and single parent living in Vienna. Her paintings were used in the film to represent Perla's work.

Martin Kudláč writes in Cineuropa that the film "explores personal and social dynamics against the backdrop of Cold War-era Europe, combining themes of migration, exile and reconciliation". Makárová herself said that the film was "a personal reflection on themes of identity and displacement, inspired by her own family history... [and] a tribute to the women in my family who defied expectations in their youth", and while "not strictly historical,...uses the political context to frame a universal story about human connections, guilt and forgiveness".

=== Filming and authenticity ===
Filming took place in the eastern Slovak city of Košice, in a tiny mining village in Slovakia, and Vienna. Georg Weiss was responsible for cinematography. The director, Alexandra Makárová, who had known Weiss for a long time, chose to show of the scenes in Slovakia with mostly dark colours, making it look bleak, while the Vienna scenes are lighter and colourful. She later said that the colour palette was very important, and "costume design is more important than the art direction for the cinematography". She chose a hotel built during the First Republic of Czechoslovakia, a "golden era", rather than portray the grey concrete architecture of Soviet occupation.

The film features scene that shows a traditional Slovak Easter Monday custom practised in villages, in which groups of men go to the houses of unmarried women, drag them out, throw them into water, and beat them with wooden sticks, and the women have to give them food or alcohol as a gift. The idea behind the custom is that it is supposed to make the women healthier.

=== Production crew ===
The film was produced by Iranian-Austrian filmmaker Arash T. Riahi and Sabine Gruber, and Klaudia Kiczak was responsible for production design. Joana Scrinzi edited the film, and the score was composed by Johannes Winkler and Rusanda Panfili. Makárová had worked with the composers for two years before filming began, when they initially composed a more classical style of music. After realising that this would romanticise the film, they decided to change it completely, and instead used a style reminiscent of 1950s-60s Polish jazz, that could have been played in a Czechoslovak bar in that 1981.

The production companies were Austria's Golden Girls Filmproduktion and Slovakia's Hailstone.

=== Other details ===
Makárová dedicated the film to her grandmother, saying "Her passion for life and determination to choose her own path were unforgettable. This film is about the right to decide for oneself—even when that decision comes at a cost".

The lead actress, Rebeka Poláková, had previously starred in The Auschwitz Report.

== Release ==
The film had its world premiere at the 54th International Film Festival Rotterdam on 3 February 2025, entered in the Tiger Competition. It had its Austrian premiere at the Diagonale in Graz on 29 March, and in June 2025, it screened at the IFF Art Film festival in Košice. In July 2025, Perla screened in the Horizons section of the Karlovy Vary International Film Festival in the Czech Republic.

The film had its domestic release on 24 July 2025.

In October, Perla screened in competition at the Adelaide Film Festival in Australia.

== Reception ==
The film was well-reviewed by Jordan Mintzner in The Hollywood Reporter. Mintzner praises the performances as well as "the way Makarova recreates the fraught emotional atmosphere of life at the end of the Cold War". He calls Klaudia Kiczak's set design "uncanny... [they] convincingly recreate the muted color tones of the era".

== Accolades ==
Perla won the Audience Award (People's Choice) at Diagonale in March 2025. This prize was worth €3,000, awarded to the director from an endowment by Kleine Zeitung.

It was awarded the FIPRESCI Prize at the IFF Art Film festival in Košice in June 2025. Lead actress Rebeka Poláková received a special mention at the awards.

It won the Constellation Feature Film Competition at the Leeds International Film Festival in November 2025.
