= Tomcat (2016 film) =

2016 film

- Film poster
- Directed by: Händl Klaus
- Written by: Händl Klaus
- Produced by: Antonin Svoboda
- Starring: Philipp Hochmair; Lukas Turtur
- Cinematography: Gerald Kerkletz
- Edited by: Joana Scrinzi
- Production company: coop99 filmproduktion
- Release date: 13 February 2016 (Berlin)
- Running time: 119 minutes
- Country: Austria
- Language: German

Tomcat (German: Kater) is a 2016 Austrian drama film directed by Klaus Händl. It was shown in the Panorama section at the 66th Berlin International Film Festival, where it won the Teddy Award as the best LGBT-related feature film of the festival.

The film stars Philipp Hochmair as Andreas and Lukas Turtur as Stefan, a well-off gay couple in Vienna whose relationship is tested when Stefan, in an uncharacteristic sudden outburst of violent anger, kills their pet cat Moses. The film's original German title is a pun on the identical German words for (a male) cat and hangover.

== Plot ==
Andreas and Stefan live with their beloved cat Moses in a beautiful old house in the vineyards around Vienna. Both work for the Vienna Radio Symphony Orchestra. Men share a passion for music and lead a happy and passionate life with a large circle of friends and acquaintances. But one morning Stefan kills Moses in a sudden outburst of anger. From this point on, skepticism and alienation define their cohabitation and become an almost insurmountable obstacle. While Stefan loses his footing, Andreas, traumatized by the death of his beloved cat and the realization that his lover was a killer, wrestles with suspicion of, and love for, Stefan.

== Cast ==
- Philipp Hochmair as Andreas
- Magdalena Kronschläger
- Lukas Turtur as Stefan
- Vitus Wieser as Officer Rieger
