= IFF Art Film =

International film festival in Košice, Slovakia

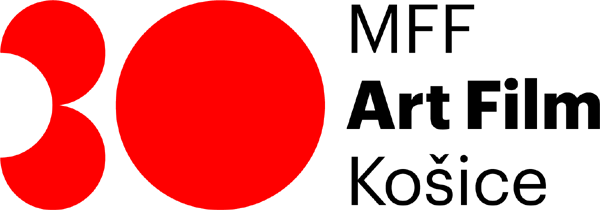

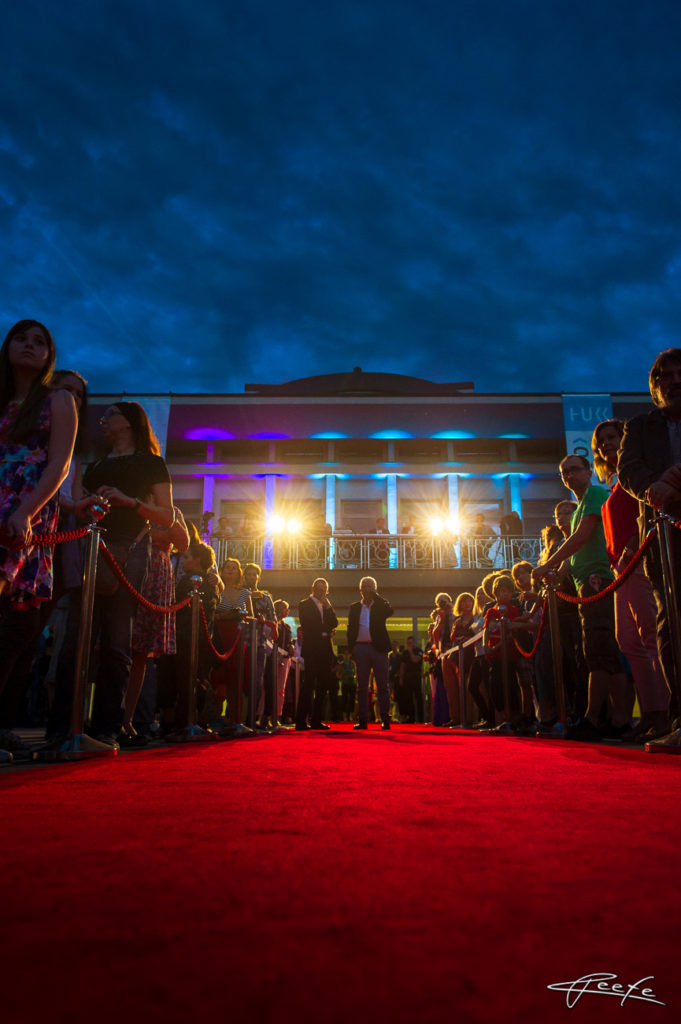
- Red carpet at IFF Art Film 2016
- Location: Košice, Slovakia
- Founded: 14 June 1993
- Founded by: Peter Hledík
- Awards: Actor's Mission; Golden Camera; Blue Angel
- Artistic director: Peter Hledík
- Festival date: 14–22 June
- Website: iffartfilm.com

IFF Art Film, previously known as Artfilm and Art Film Fest, is an annual international film festival founded in Trenčianske Teplice, Slovakia, in 1993, shortly after the dissolution of Czechoslovakia. The first event was held on 14 June 1993, under the auspices of UNESCO. It is the longest continuously running international film festival in the country. In 2016, it was relocated to Košice, Slovakia's second-largest city. The event traditionally takes place from 14 to 22 June.

== History ==
Artfilm was created in 1993 by film director Petr Hledík, who has been the festival's longtime artistic director. According to Hledík, at the beginning of the 1990s, the Koliba film studios in Bratislava were in decline, funding for Slovak cinematography was rapidly dwindling, and films almost stopped being made.

=== Editions ===
==== 1993 ====
The first festival was held on 14 June 1993 in the spa town of Trenčianske Teplice, under the auspices of UNESCO. It was dedicated to films focused on the Baroque period, as 1992 had been the International Year of the Baroque, and many films were made on the subject. In reaction to the breakup of Czechoslovakia, the festival's organisers decided to create a retrospective of documentary film work throughout the Czechoslovak era. That year, the celebrity guest of honour was British avant-garde filmmaker Peter Greenaway, and the festival drew only 200–300 attendees.

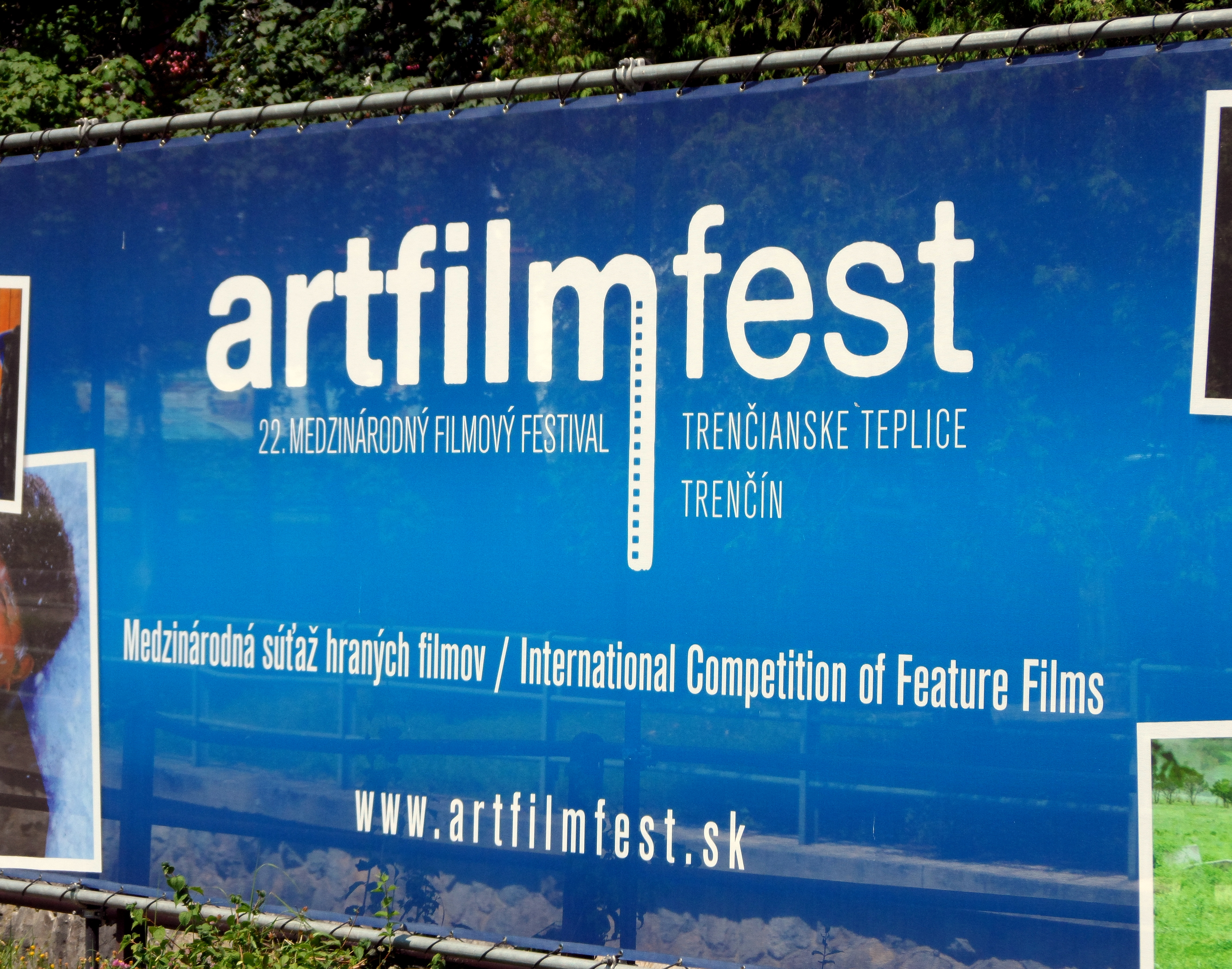
Art Film Fest banner

==== 1995 ====
As time went on, the organisers became increasingly aware that limiting the festival to documentaries was an unnecessary constraint, and they consequently widened its scope. In 1995, the event achieved its first major milestone: shifting focus to a presentation of films concerning art and artists. 1995 was also the year when the first Actor's Mission award was bestowed, going to Italian actor Franco Nero.

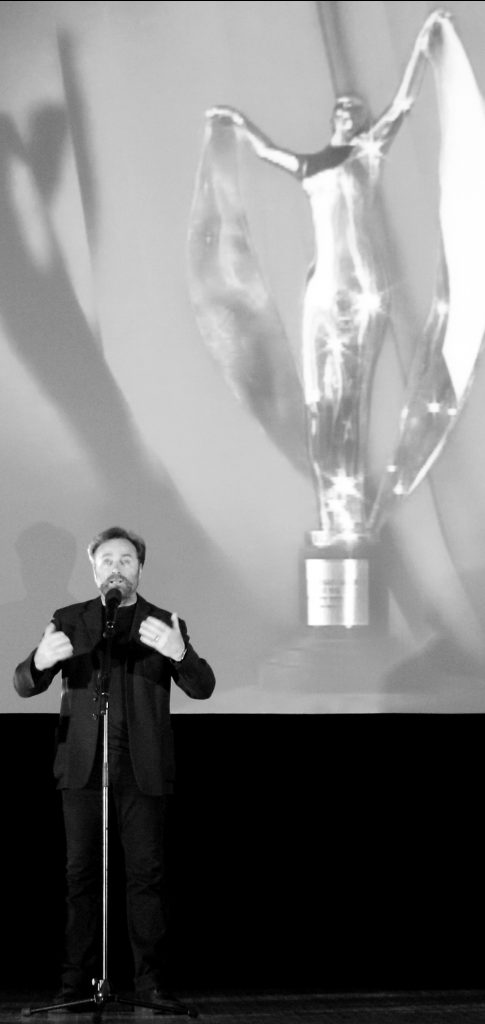
Actor's Mission Award winner Franco Nero

==== 1997 ====
In 1997, the festival's screenings expanded to the nearby city of Trenčín, and a feature film competition was introduced.

==== 2001 ====
Artfilm began awarding a variety of Slovak and international film professionals with the Golden Camera award for notable contributions to the filmmaking craft. The award has been received by numerous renowned cinema figures, including Roman Polanski, Jean-Claude Carriére, Emir Kusturica, Ettore Scola, Andrei Konchalovsky, Ulrich Seidl, Andrzej Wajda, Martin Hollý, Juraj Jakubisko, and Dušan Hanák.

==== 2002 ====
Artfilm began to define itself as a festival of film artistry, and since then, it has focused on feature films from around the world. 2002 also saw the arrival of the open-air cinema known as the Čadík Brothers' Travelling Cinematograph.

==== 2005 ====
In 2005, the festival was subsumed by the production house Forza, and actor and singer Milan Lasica became its president, with Hledík as vice president.

==== 2007 ====
The festival celebrated its fifteen-year anniversary in 2007, having accumulated 105 total festival days and screened over 1,500 feature, medium-length, and short films, as well as animated, documentary, and experimental works.

==== 2009 ====
Peter Nágel became the new program director in 2009, and the festival changed its name to Art Film Fest. This was accompanied by a marked revival of audience interest, with the event attracting roughly 25,000 visitors.

==== 2016 ====
In 2016, after 23 years, Art Film Fest changed its location, moving to the second-biggest city in Slovakia, Košice. Reasons included the festival's future prospects warranting improved conditions for further development, in the form of more convenient, comfortable, and varied cinema infrastructure, and in order to meet the modern standards of an international film festival. Events have since been held from 14 to 22 June at Košice's Kunsthalle exhibition space, Kasárne Kulturpark, the old town hall, Kino Úsmev movie theatre, the former tobacco factory of Tabačka Kulturfabrik—now a cultural centre, and at Amfiteáter Košice.

==== 2020–2022 ====
The event was not held in 2020, due to the COVID-19 pandemic. The following year, the organizers held a reduced five-day edition, and in 2022, it was cancelled once more, this time owing to a lack of funds.

== Description ==
IFF Art Film is the longest continuously running international film festival in Slovakia. The event traditionally takes place from 14 to 22 June and includes autograph signings, discussions, musical performances, and workshops.

== Award categories ==
Art Film Fest has several competition categories and awards. The feature film competition is evaluated by a five-member international jury, and the short film competition by a three-member international jury. Experts from various film professions are nominated in advance by the juries.

=== Blue Angel ===
- Blue Angel for Best Feature Film – awarded to film producers
- Blue Angel for Best Direction
- Blue Angel for Best Female Performance
- Blue Angel for Best Male Performance
- Blue Angel – prize for best short film, awarded to the director

=== International competition of feature films over sixty minutes ===
This competition is aimed at up-and-coming directors—only debuts or second and third films can be submitted.

=== International competition of short films under thirty minutes ===
This competition is not limited by genre—feature films, documentaries, animations, and other films can be submitted.

=== Actor's Mission ===
This prize, awarded since 1995, is associated with the tradition of attaching a sign with the awardee's name to the Bridge of Fame in Trenčianske Teplice.

== Gallery ==
Numerous Czech, Slovak, and international actors have received the Actor's Mission trophy since the festival's inception in 1993, including Ben Kingsley, Gérard Depardieu, Jeremy Irons, Isabelle Huppert, Geraldine Chaplin, Klaus Maria Brandauer, Erland Josephson, Jacqueline Bisset, Omar Sharif, Jean-Paul Belmondo, Vlastimil Brodský, Iva Janžurová, Zdeněk Svěrák, Josef Abrhám, Jozef Kroner, Juraj Kukura, and Marián Labuda.

This gallery presents a sampling of Actor's Mission memorial plaques on the Bridge of Fame in Trenčianske Teplice.

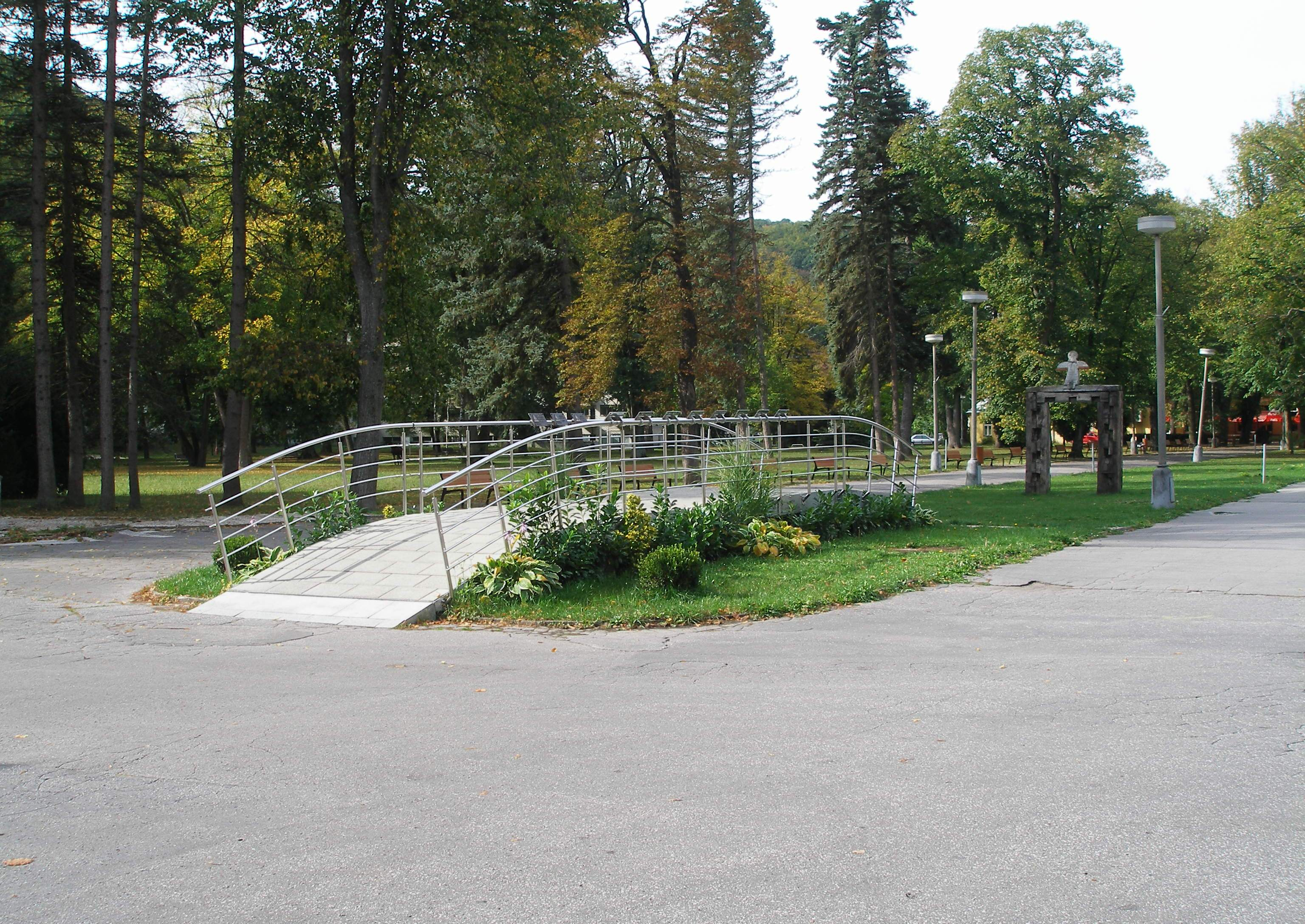

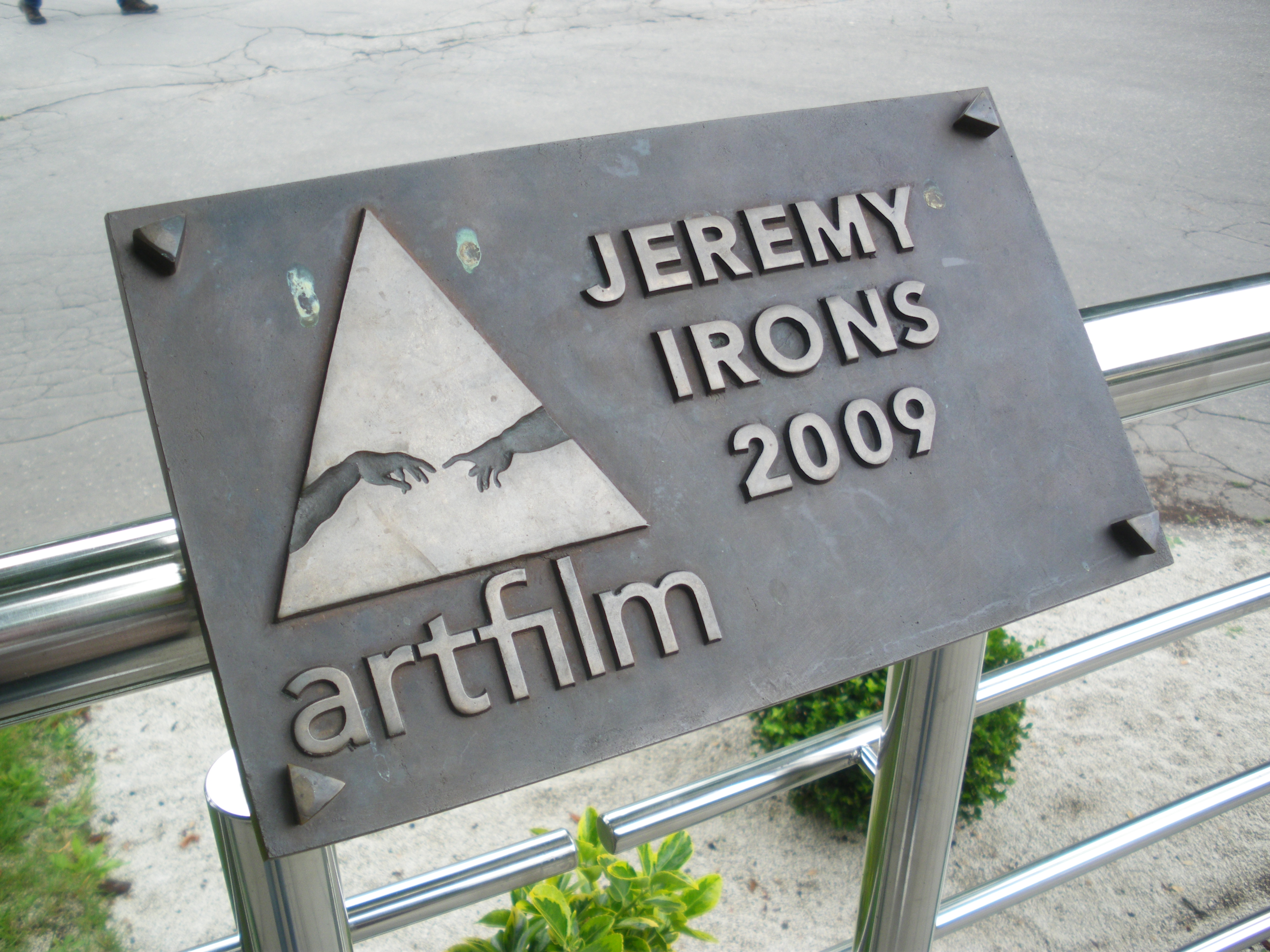

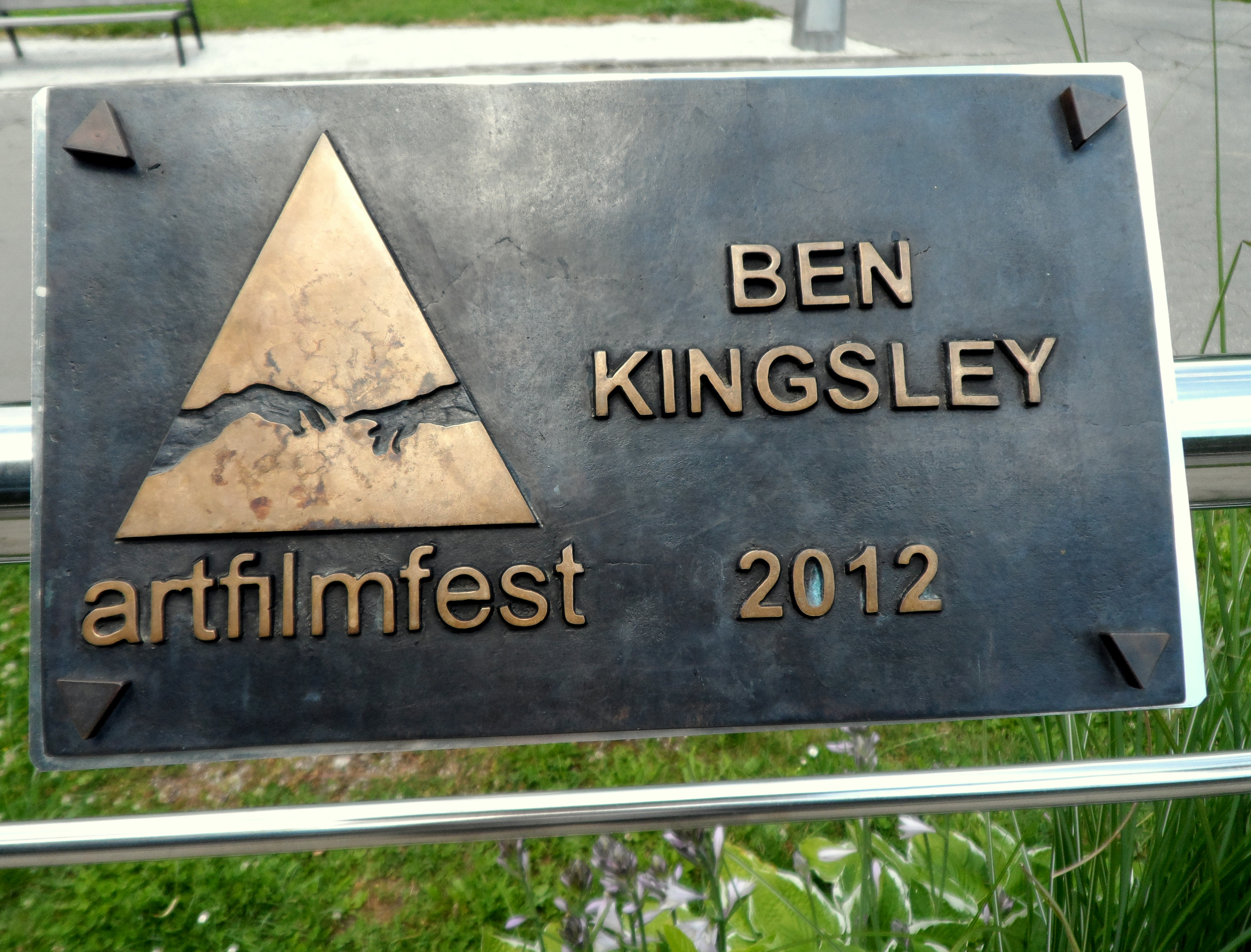

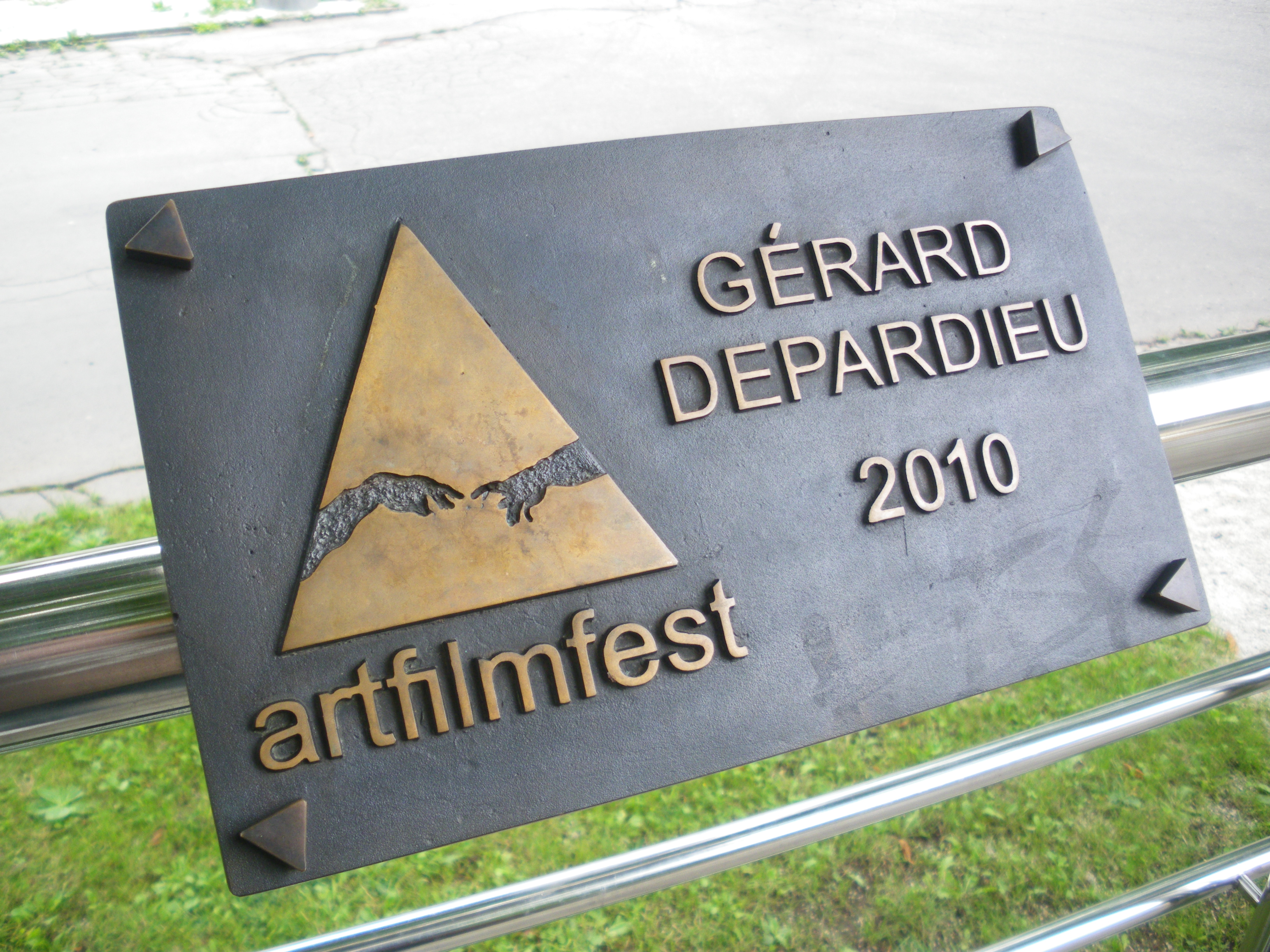

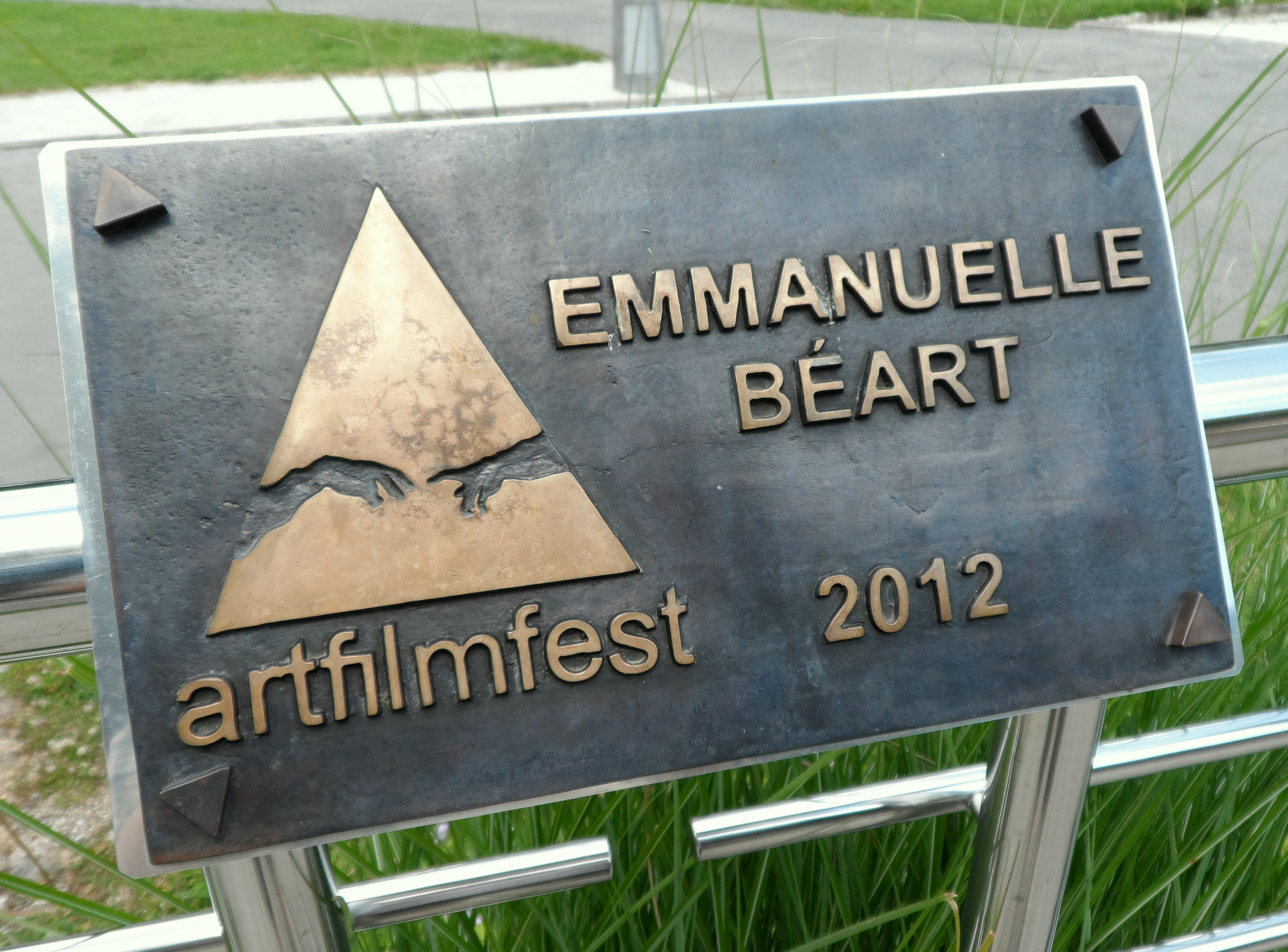

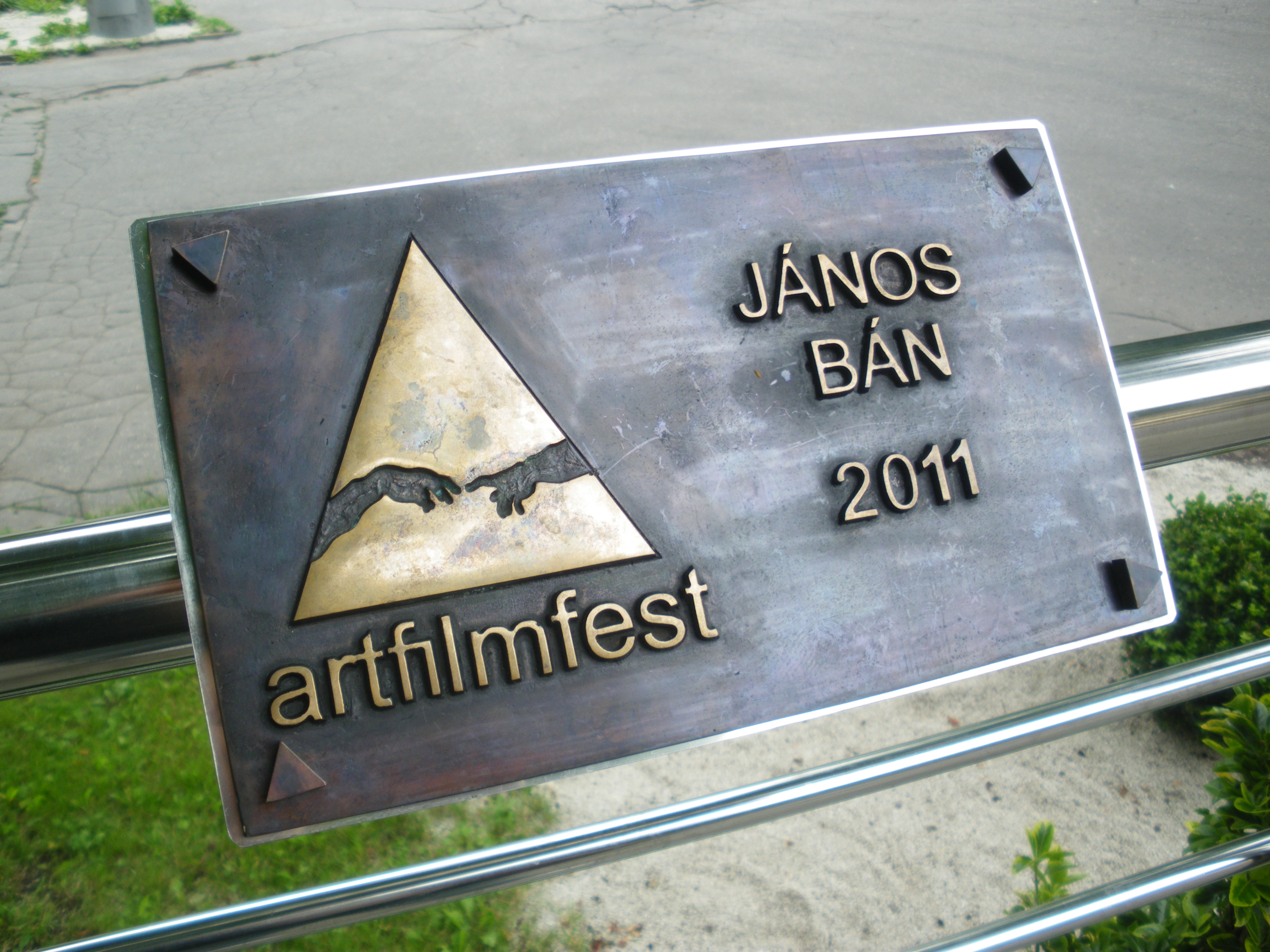

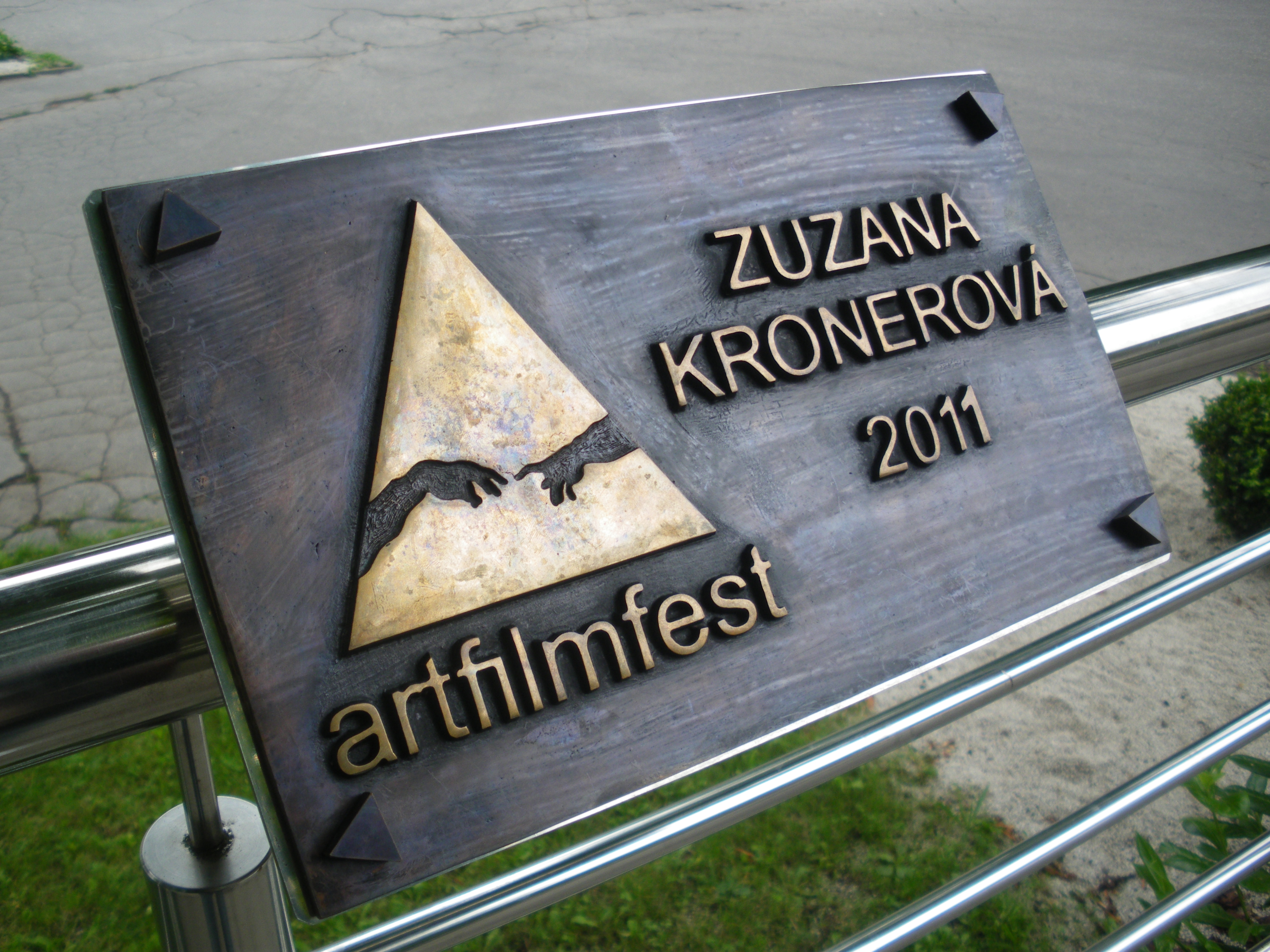

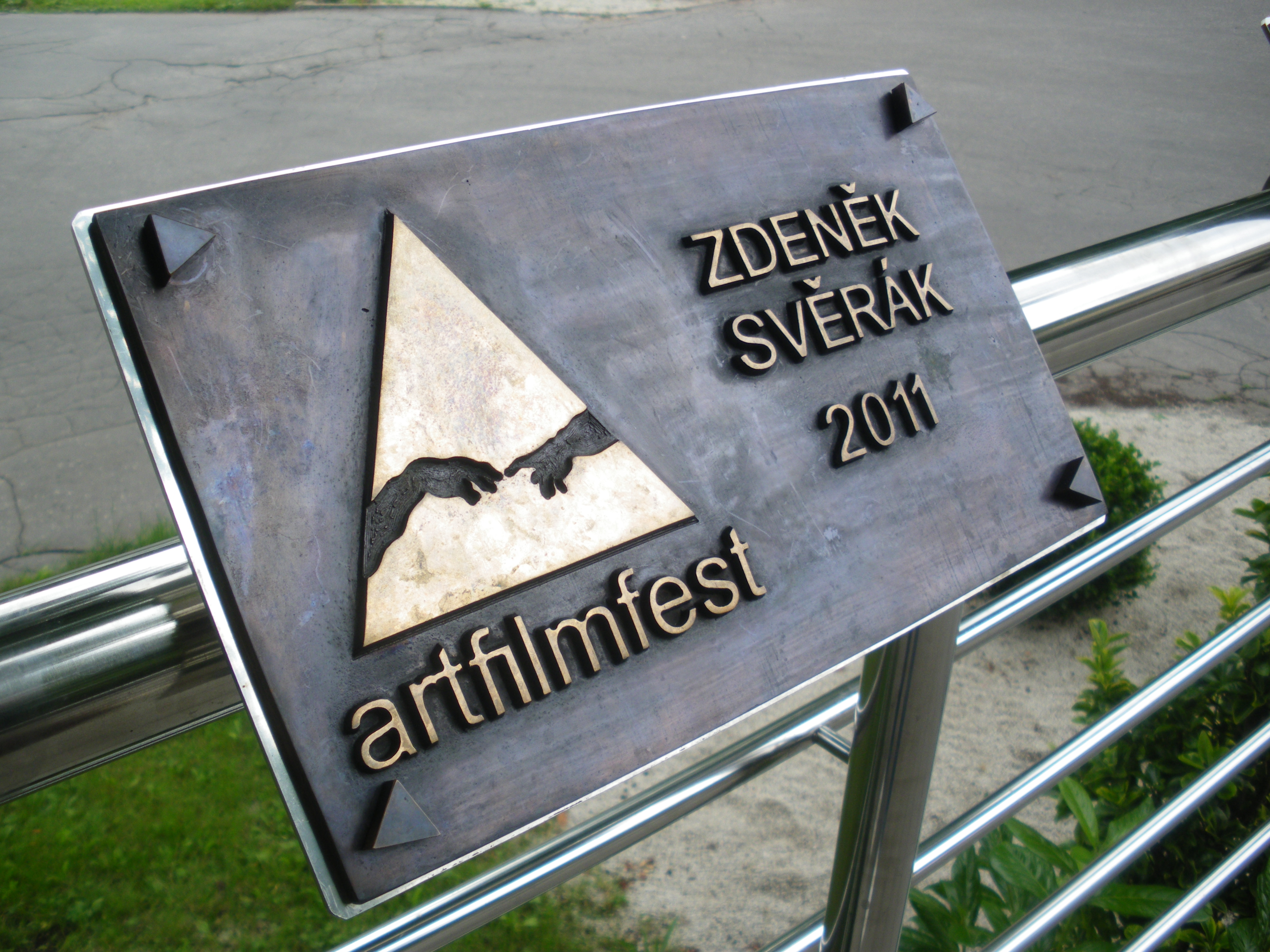

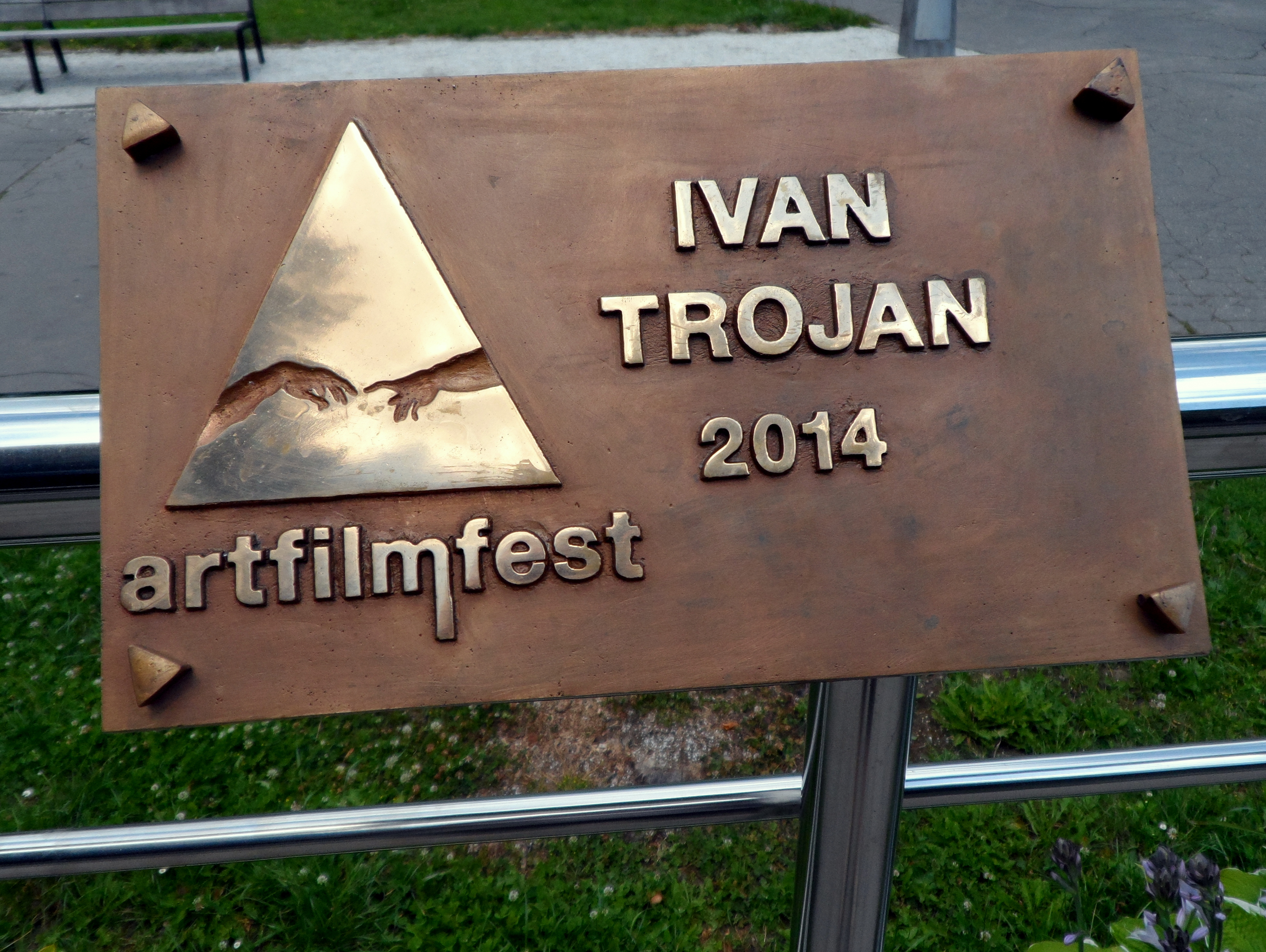

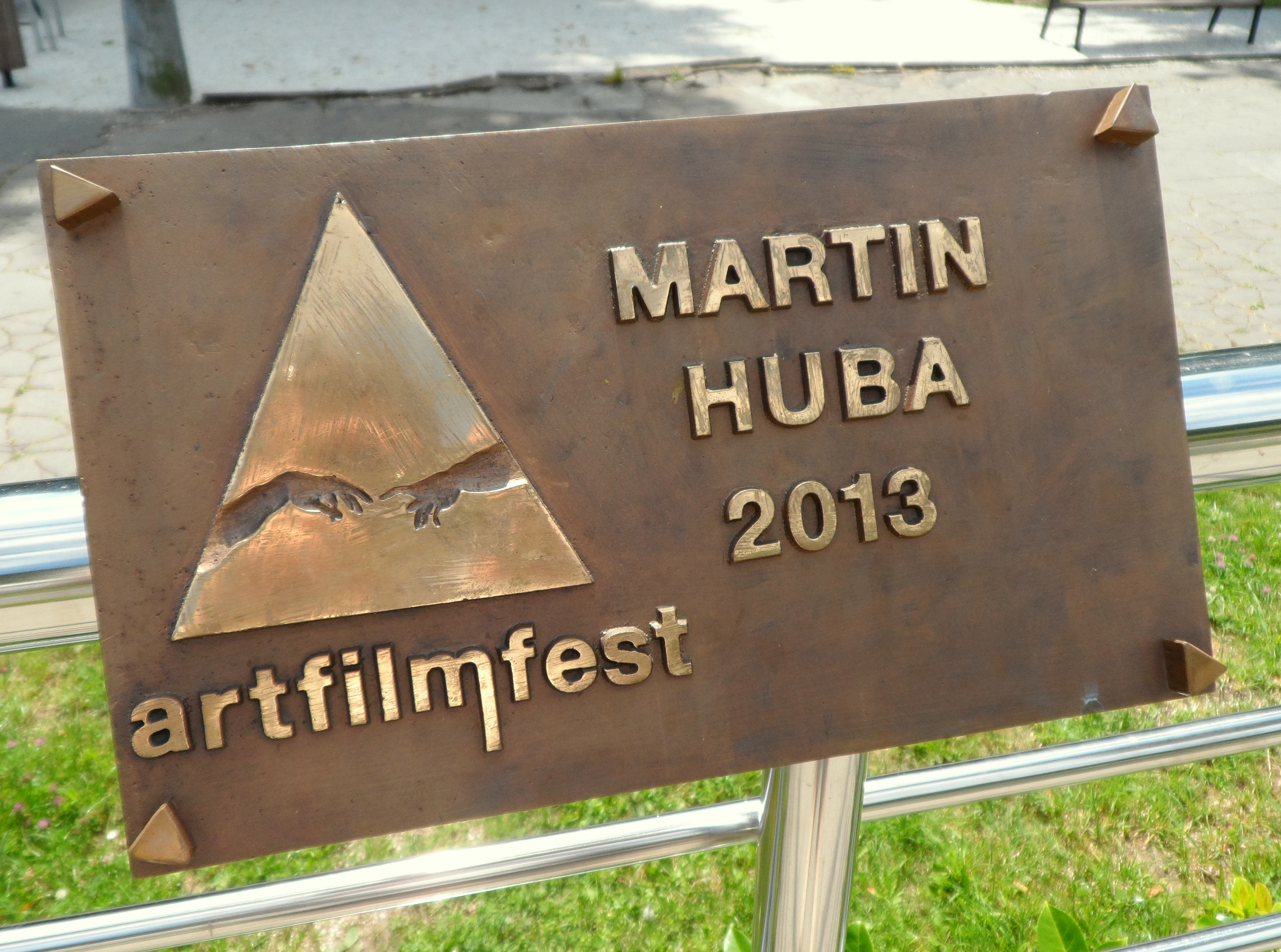

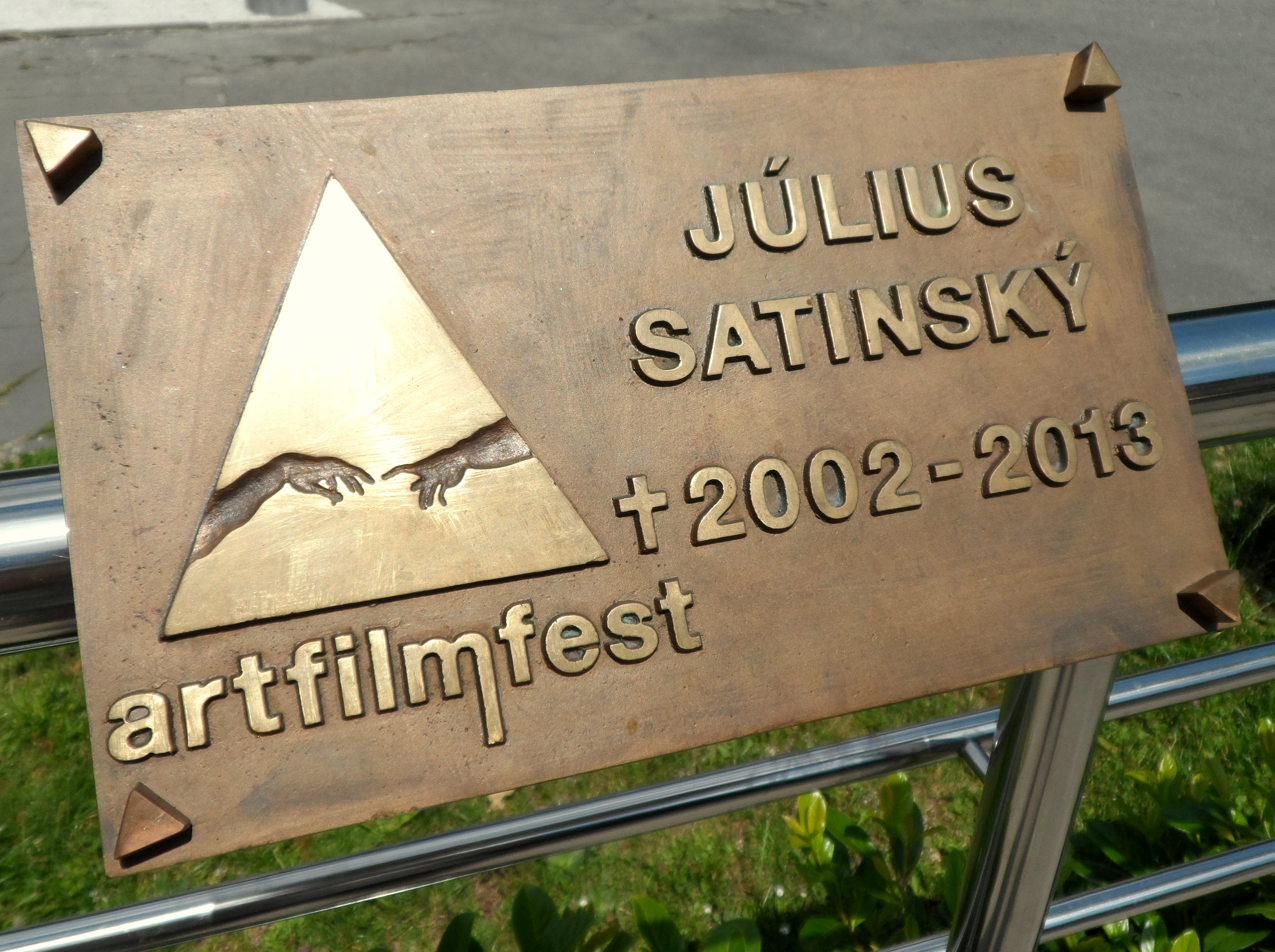

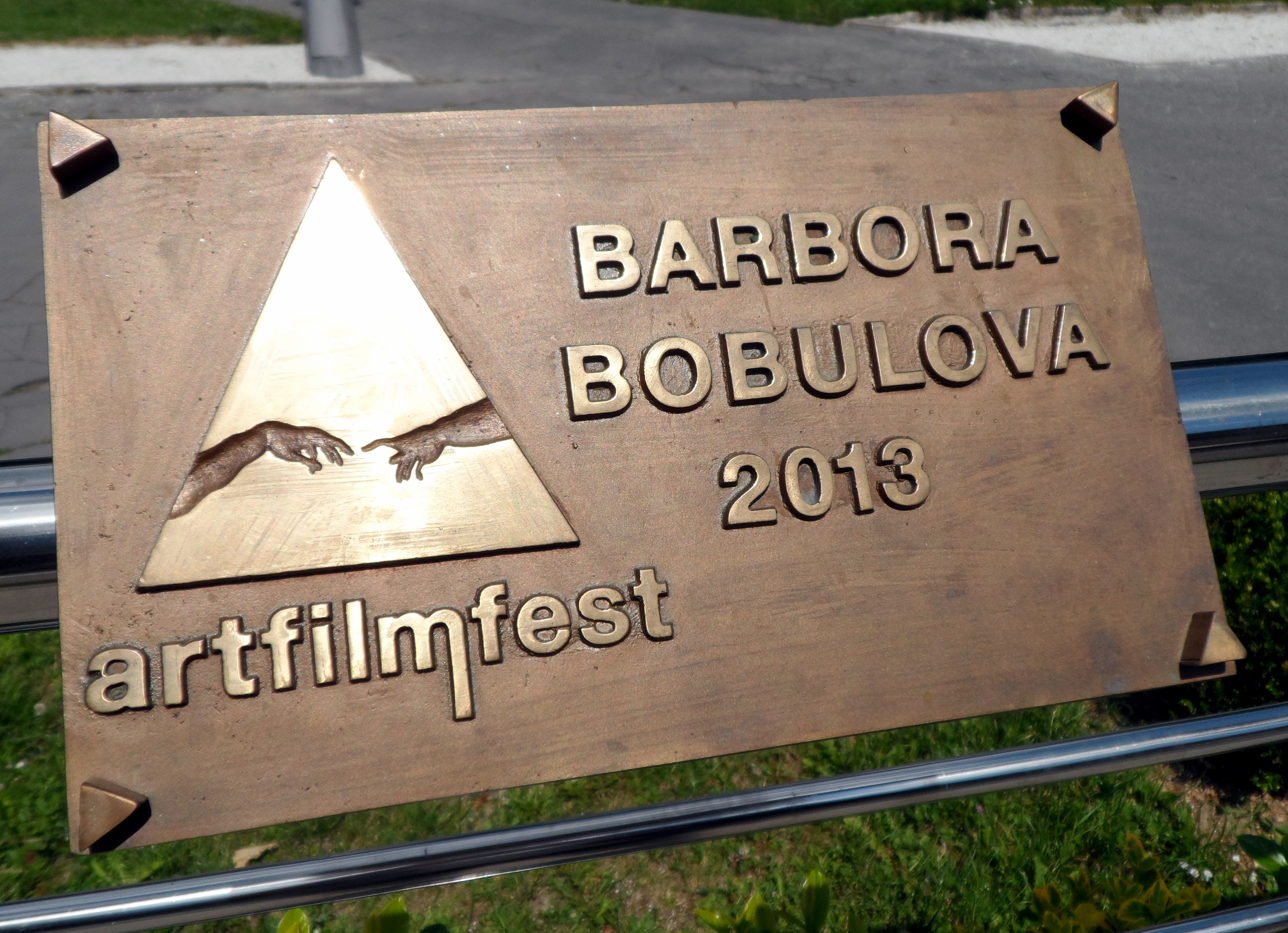
