= Alexandra Makárová =

Slovak filmmaker

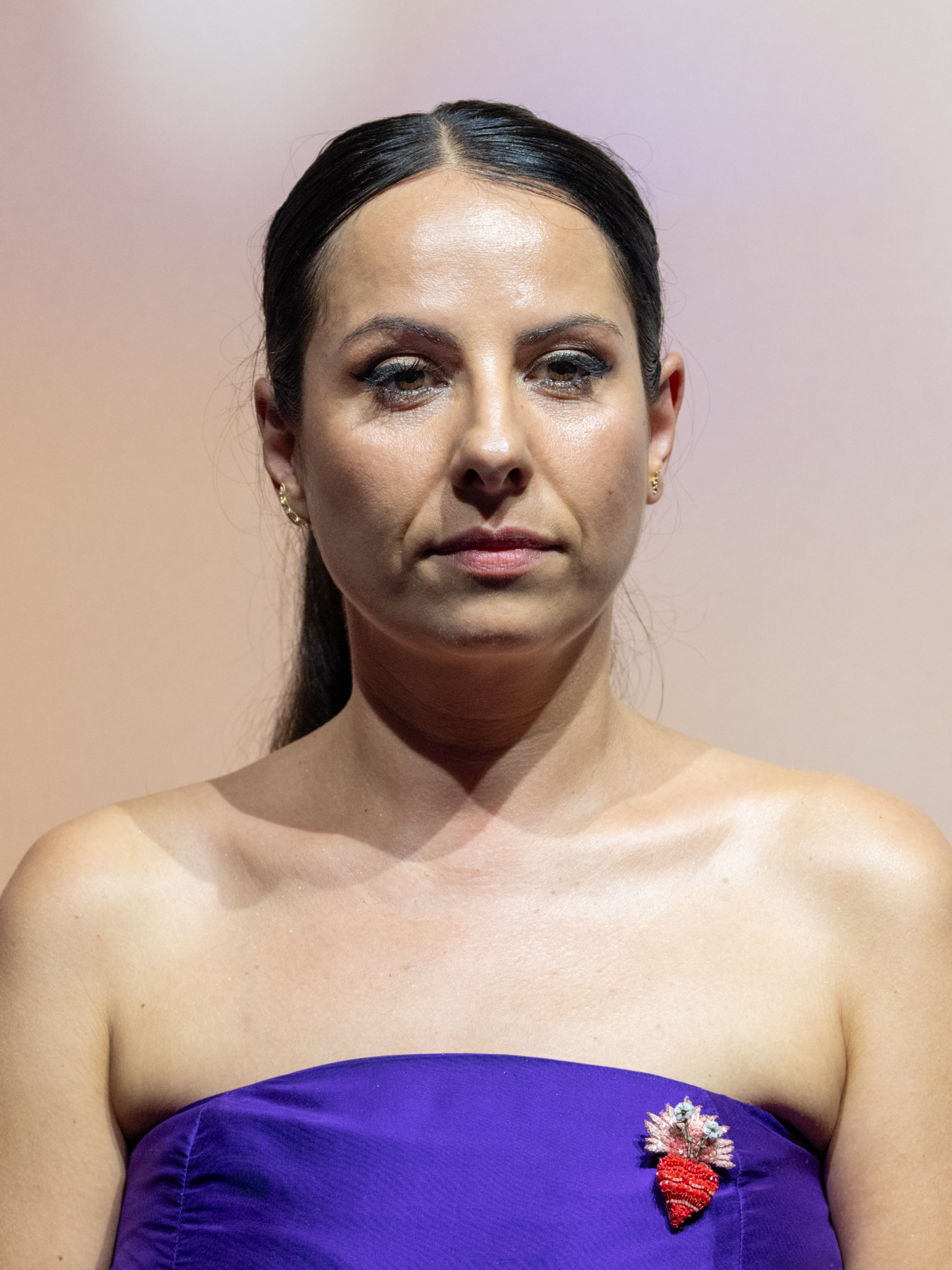
- Alexandra Makárová in 2026
- Born: 1985 (age 40–41); Košice, Czechoslovakia
- Occupations: Film director, screenwriter
- Years active: 2011–present
- Known for: Perla (2025)

Alexandra Makárová (born 1985) is a Slovak-Austrian film director and screenwriter. Her second feature film is the Austrian-Slovak co-production Perla, which premiered in January 2025.

== Early life and education ==
Alexandra Makárová was born in Košice, Czechoslovakia, in 1985 in to a single mother who was 19 when she was born. For her first few years, she lived with her grandparents in Czechoslovakia until, soon after the fall of the Iron Curtain, her mother took her to Vienna, Austria. Her great-grandparents were members of the White Guard who became refugees when they fled Russia. Most family members were killed in 1917, but some escaped through Czechoslovakia. After World War II in 1945, her great-grandfather was captured by the Red Army and was imprisoned in a gulag in Siberia for 10 years. Makárová heard many family stories about the war as a child. Her mother went to Austria after the fall of the Iron Curtain, and only her grandmother stayed in Czechoslovakia, so Alexandra grew up with the feeling of being a foreigner in another country.

Her mother was an artist and a "free spirit" who liked to party, and young Alexandra had to grow up quickly and behave like an adult at a young age.

== Career ==
Makárová's short film Sola (2013) her feature film directorial debut, Crush My Heart (Zerschlag mein Herz), released in 2018, earned critical acclaim for their psychological depth.

Crush My Heart was backed by the Arts and Culture Division of the Federal Chancellery of Austria, the Culture Department of Vienna, and the Province of Lower Austria. The film tells the story of two Romany teenagers from a poor village in Eastern Slovakia who fall in love after being sent to beg on the streets of Vienna. Makárová co-wrote the screenplay with Sebastian Schmidl, and the film was produced by Austrian actor Simon Schwarz along with Konstantin Seitz of Alternative Productions-Konstantin Seitz. She was inspired by meeting a Roma boy who had been begging Viennese streets for many years, and proceeded to spend two years researching the Roma community living in the city's outskirts and in Slovak slums. Crush My Heart uses an almost entirely amateur cast, whose performances were well-reviewed. The score, composed by Johannes Winkler, was inspired by traditional Roma songs and sung by Vanja Toscana de Almeida. The film had its world premiere at the Diagonale in Graz, Austria, early in 2018 before being entered in the main competition of the Art Film Fest Košice.

She wrote and directed her second feature film Perla, which had its world premiere at Rotterdam International Film Festival on 3 February 2025. The film stars Rebeka Poláková in the lead role, with main supporting roles played by Austrian actor Simon Schwarz as her husband, Slovak actor Noel Czuczor as her former lover, and Carmen Diego as her daughter Julia. The film takes place in both Vienna and Slovakia in 1981. It won the FIPRESCI Prize at the IFF Art Film festival in Košice in June 2025. Lead actress Rebeka Poláková received a special mention at the awards.
