= List of Austrian films of the 2010s =

A list of films produced in the Cinema of Austria in the 2010s ordered by year of release. For an alphabetical list of articles on Austrian films see Category:Austrian films.

Year	Title	Genre	Director	Cast	Studio	Notes
2010	3faltig	Comedy	Harald Sicheritz	Christian Tramitz, Matthias Schweighöfer		
2010	Der Atem des Himmels	Drama / Heimatfilm	Reinhold Bilgeri		Reinhold Bilgeri	Feature movie about the avalanches at Blons/Vorarlberg in January; based on the novel by the director
2010	Kottan ermittelt: Rien ne va plus	Crime/comedy	Peter Patzak	Lukas Resetarits	Satel Film	Cinema adaption of the Kottan series
2010	Tag und Nacht	Drama	Sabine Derflinger	Anna Rot, Magdalena Kronschläger		
2010	The Unintentional Kidnapping of Mrs. Elfriede Ott	Comedy	Andreas Prochaska	Elfriede Ott, Michael Ostrowski, Andreas Kiendl, Gerhard Liebmann	Dor Film	Won Best Movie, Best Script and Best Music at the Österreichischen Filmpreis 2011

Year	Title	Genre	Director	Cast	Studio	Notes
2011	Anfang 80	Drama	Sabine Hiebler, Gerhard Ertl	Christine Ostermayer, Karl Merkatz		aka Coming of Age
2011	Atmen	Drama	Karl Markovics	Thomas Schubert, Karin Lischka, Gerhard Liebmann, Georg Friedrich		aka Breathing
2011	Black Brown White	Drama	Erwin Wagenhofer	Clare-Hope Ashitey, Fritz Karl		
2011	Brand		Thomas Roth	Josef Bierbichler		
2011	Chalet Girl	Romantic comedy	Phil Traill	Felicity Jones, Ed Westwick	IFC Films; Momentum Pictures	English-language film
2011	The Fatherless		Marie Kreutzer	Andreas Kiendl, Andrea Wenzl, Emily Cox		
2011	In Another Lifetime	War	Elisabeth Scharang	Ursula Strauss, Johannes Krisch, Péter Végh, Orsolya Tóth		
2011	Inside America		Barbara Eder			
2011	Michael		Markus Schleinzer			
2011	My Best Enemy	War	Wolfgang Murnberger	Moritz Bleibtreu, Georg Friedrich		
2011	One Way Trip 3D		Markus Welter			3D film

Year	Title	Genre	Director	Cast	Studio	Notes
2012	Invasion	Drama	Dito Tsintsadze	Burghart Klaußner		German-Austrian co-production
2012	Kuma	Drama	Umut Dag		Wega Film	
2012	Paradise: Faith	Drama	Ulrich Seidl	Maria Hofstätter		
2012	Paradise: Love	Drama	Ulrich Seidl		Ulrich Seidl Film	
2012	The Strange Case of Wilhelm Reich	Biography	Antonin Svoboda	Klaus Maria Brandauer		
2012	The Wall	Drama	Julian Pölsler	Martina Gedeck		

Year	Title	Genre	Director	Cast	Studio	Notes
2013	Blood Glacier	Horror	Marvin Kren	Gerhard Liebmann, Madita		a.k.a. The Station
2013	October November	Drama	Götz Spielmann	Nora Waldstätten, Ursula Strauss, Peter Simonischek, Sebastian Koch		
2013	Paradise: Hope	Drama	Ulrich Seidl			
2013	Taking It Back	Comedy	Andreas Schmied	Michael Ostrowski		
2013	Talea	Drama	Katharina Mückstein		La Banda Film	

Year	Title	Genre	Director	Cast	Studio	Notes
2014	Casanova Variations	Biography	Michael Sturminger	John Malkovich		
2014	The Dark Valley	Western	Andreas Prochaska	Sam Riley, Tobias Moretti, Paula Beer		
2014	Goodnight Mommy	Horror	Veronika Franz, Severin Fiala	Susanne Wuest		
2014	Die Gstettensaga: The Rise of Echsenfriedl	Comedy	Johannes Grenzfurthner		monochrom, ORF, Traum & Wahnsinn	
2014	Hopped Up - Friedliche Droge	Horror	Michael Fischa			
2014	Macondo	Drama	Sudabeh Mortezai			
2014	My Blind Heart	Drama	Peter Brunner		Cataract Vision	
2014	Rise Up! And Dance	Romance / Music	Barbara Gräftner			
2014	The Silent Mountain	War	Ernst Gossner	William Moseley		
2014	Therapy for a Vampire	Comedy	David Ruehm	Tobias Moretti, Karl Fischer, Jeanette Hain		

Year	Title	Genre	Director	Cast	Studio	Notes
2015	Chucks	Drama	Sabine Hiebler, Gerhard Ertl	Anna Posch	Dor Film	
2015	Dreams Rewired	Documentary	Manu Luksch			
2015	Jack	Thriller	Elisabeth Scharang	Johannes Krisch, Corinna Harfouch, Birgit Minichmayr		
2015	Life Eternal	Comedy	Wolfgang Murnberger	Josef Hader, Tobias Moretti, Nora Waldstätten, Roland Düringer		

Year	Title	Genre	Director	Cast	Studio	Notes
2016	Fly Away Home	Drama, War	Miriam Unger	Zita Gaier, Ursula Strauss, Gerald Votava		
2016	Hanna's Sleeping Dogs	Drama	Andreas Gruber	Nike Seitz, Hannelore Elsner, Franziska Weisz		
2016	Traceroute	Documentary, comedy	Johannes Grenzfurthner		monochrom, Reisenbauer Film	
2016	We Used to Be Cool	Comedy	Marie Kreutzer	Vicky Krieps, Pheline Roggan, Pia Hierzegger, Andreas Kiendl, Manuel Rubey		

Year	Title	Genre	Director	Cast	Studio	Notes
2017	Cold Hell	Thriller	Stefan Ruzowitzky	Violetta Schurawlow, Tobias Moretti, Robert Palfrader, Sammy Sheik		
2017	Hagazussa	Horror	Lukas Feigelfeld	Aleksandra Cwen		
2017	Wild Mouse	Comedy	Josef Hader	Josef Hader, Pia Hierzegger, Georg Friedrich, Jörg Hartmann		

Year	Title	Genre	Director	Cast	Studio	Notes
2018	Angelo	Drama	Markus Schleinzer	Makita Samba, Alba Rohrwacher	Novotny & Novotny	
2018	L'Animale	Drama	Katharina Mückstein	Sophie Stockinger	Nikolaus Geyrhalter Filmproduktion, La Banda Film	
2018	Glossary of Broken Dreams	Documentary, comedy	Johannes Grenzfurthner		monochrom	
2018	The Tobacconist	Drama	Nikolaus Leytner	Bruno Ganz, Simon Morzé		

Year	Title	Genre	Director	Cast	Studio	Notes
2019	Little Joe	Drama	Jessica Hausner	Emily Beecham, Ben Whishaw, Kerry Fox		Co-produced by Germany and United Kingdom
2019	The Ground Beneath My Feet	Drama	Marie Kreutzer	Valerie Pachner, Pia Hierzegger, Mavie Hörbiger		
2019	Caviar	Drama	Elena Tikhonova	Margarita Breitkreiz, Darya Nosik, Sabrina Reiter, Georg Friedrich, Simon Schwarz	MR-Film Kurt Mrkwicka, Film AG Produktions, Witcraft Filmproduktion	
