= King Abdulaziz Center for World Culture =

Cultural centre situated in Dhahran, Saudi Arabia

Coordinates: 26.335°N 50.122°E

King Abdulaziz Center for World Culture (Ithra)
- Logo

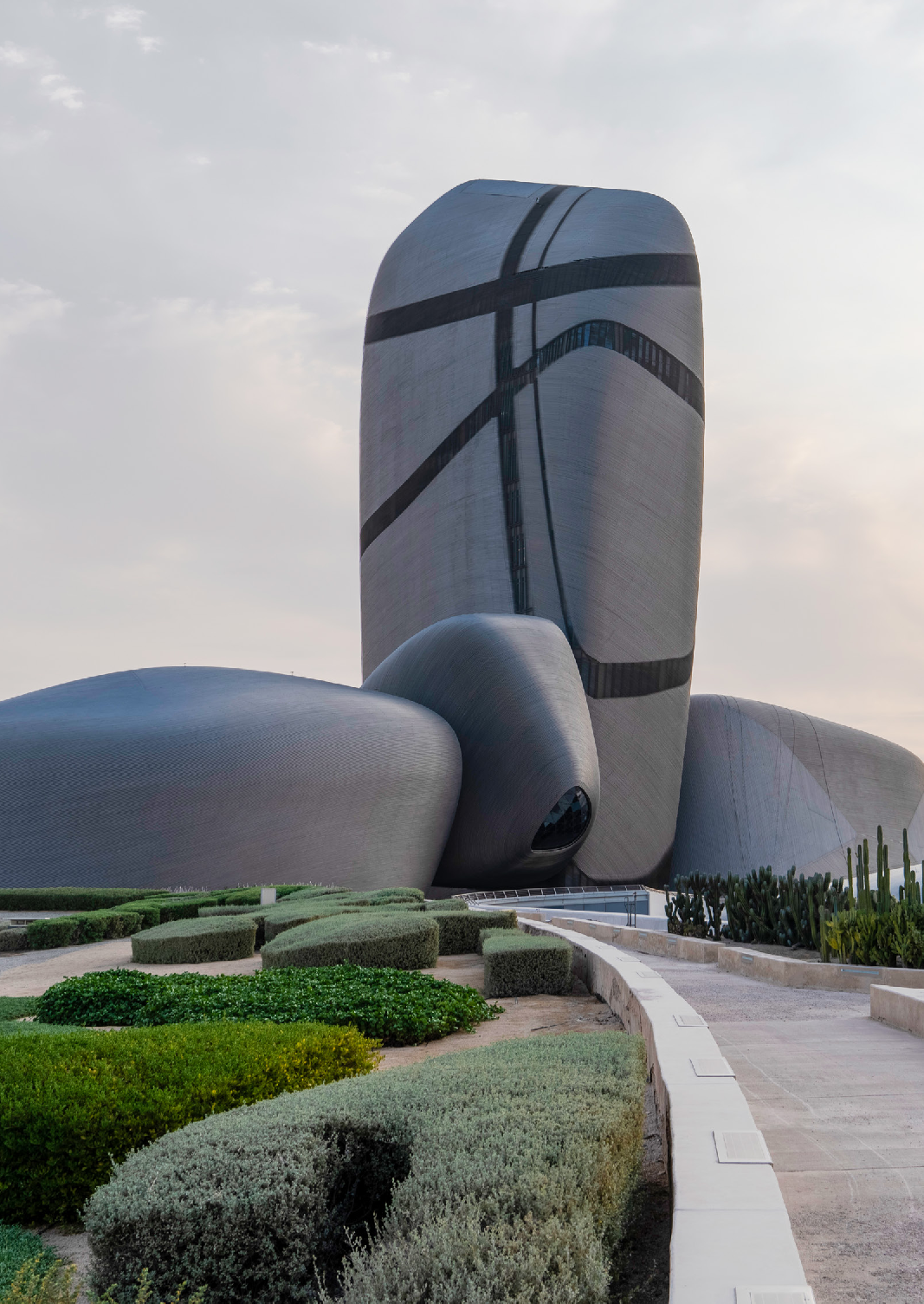
- Ithra Building
- Established: 1 December 2016; 9 years ago
- Type: Cultural center
- Purpose: Culture, art, innovation, cross-cultural engagement, education, content creation, library, film, theater
- Location: Dhahran, Saudi Arabia
- Key people: Abdullah Alrashid, Director
- Website: www.ithra.com/en/

The King Abdulaziz Center for World Culture (Arabic: مركز الملك عبد العزيز الثقافي العالمي), also known as Ithra (Arabic: إثراء, 'enrichment'), is a cultural centre situated in Dhahran, Saudi Arabia. It was built by Saudi Aramco and inaugurated by King Salman bin Abdulaziz on December 1, 2016.

It is operated by Saudi Aramco. The center is located where the first commercial Saudi oilfield was found in March 1938.

The center has a museum, library, cinema, theater, and exhibition halls. It was designed by the Norwegian architectural firm Snøhetta. The center has been listed in Time magazine as one of the world's top 100 places to visit and attracted one million visitors in 2019.

== Objective ==
Ithra was established by Saudi Aramco, the national oil corporation of the Kingdom of Saudi Arabia. The center's own stated aims is to “make a tangible and positive impact on human development by inspiring a passion for knowledge, creativity, and cross-cultural engagement for the future of the kingdom." At the start of the project, the initiative behind Ithra was to diversify Saudi Arabia's economy since oil, which dominates the country's economy, is limited. As Ithra developed, the motive behind it evolved to becoming a center of education and heritage while also promoting innovation and creativity to enrich the cultural life in Saudi.

== Architecture and design ==
The building covers 80,000 square meters with its shape being inspired by the internal structural shape of oil-bearing rock formations. These rock formations are designed in a structure where three stones are on the ground while the fourth stone, the Keystone, is suspended and being carried by the other stones. This concept was executed to represent teamwork and how different components rely on one another. The Norwegian architectural firm Snøhetta designed the building and the UK professional services firm Buro Happold led the engineering design.

The levels of the building are arranged thematically and intended to suggest a progression through the ages. Areas dealing with history and the past are at the lowest levels, beneath ground level and the ground floor dealing with the present. The higher levels are mainly situated in the structure known as the Knowledge Tower, with the intention being that the knowledge communicated in the tower's teaching rooms will equip citizens for the future.

The location of Ithra was purposely chosen near Prosperity Well, which is Saudi Arabia’s first commercial oil well. The reason behind this was to show the shift from traditional energy sources like oil to energy from people’s spirits, capabilities, and creativity. Another strategic choice was using silver tubes to cover the structures which is similar to the pipes used to extract the oil.

Regarding the environmental point of view, the building was designed in accordance with prevailing LEED standards to minimize adverse ecological impact. For example, the plants in the surrounding gardens were selected from desert species and intended to minimize use of water and survive dry desert conditions. They also used other strategies to maintain sustainable like harvesting rainwater, recycle 80% of its waste, and using portable water. In 2023, Ithra received LEED gold certificate after three years of maintaining its sustainability of the environment.

In April 2018, the King Abdulaziz Center for World Culture hosted the 29th Arab League summit, this was the first time the summit had been held in the Eastern Province of Saudi Arabia.

== Exhibitions and events ==
Theater

Ithra Theater's 900-seat auditorium has hosted international and regional performers. The King Abdulaziz Center for World Culture has a stated intention to showcase the best of international culture as well as the best of regional, Arab and Saudi talent. As of May 2020 Ithra Theater has staged performances by the Mariinsky Theater Orchestra of Saint Petersburg, Russia; the Vienna Chamber Orchestra, of Vienna, Austria; La Scala of Milan, Italy; and the Iraqi oud player Naseer Shamma. In addition, Ithra has staged the Manganiyar Connection – featuring performers from Rajasthan, India; the live stage version of the Wizard of Oz; and Slava's Snowshow by the Russian clown and director Slava Polunin.

Short-term exhibitions

The King Abdulaziz Center for World Culture has a dedicated area for short-term exhibitions, known as the Great Hall, and featuring copper paneling. It has hosted an exhibition of original paintings by the Norwegian Expressionist artist Edvard Munch. This exhibition included an original print of The Scream, made by the artist himself. The hall has also hosted an exhibition of manuscripts by Leonardo da Vinci. The grand opening of Ajyaal Gallery hosts the inaugural and imaginative Being Saudi exhibition by Kvorning Design, Copenhagen and built by Modelcraft Group, Riyadh. The exhibition allows visitors to engage with Saudi Arabian culture, across five different regions, and covers poetry, music, fashion and patterns in a non-traditional format. Conceived as an immersive visitor experience, Being Saudi communicates the kingdom's rich culture heritage in an innovative way.

Global Knowledge Society Forum

In 2013, The King Abdulaziz Center for World Culture hosted the inaugural Global Knowledge Society Forum in partnership with UNESCO in Dhahran, Saudi Arabia. Over 500 delegates attended the forum to listen to global, regional and national experts from government, academia, civil society and the private sector and actively discuss and share current developments in the creation, acquisition and dissemination of knowledge in order to achieve sustainable human development.

== Facilities ==
=== Museums ===
The museum is situated on four levels and is arranged thematically into four galleries: contemporary art, Saudi heritage, Islamic civilization, and natural history and human ecology. The contemporary art, heritage and Islamic civilization galleries operate non-permanent displays and change their exhibitions on a regular basis. From 2018 to 2020, the Islamic civilization gallery hosted an exhibition of Islamic art in conjunction with the Los Angeles County Museum of Art.

=== Film screenings ===
Ithra Cinema is one of the first to be operational in the Kingdom of Saudi Arabia. It displays a mix of movies, including popular international features, documentaries and independent arthouse-style features. Ithra also seeks to develop the Saudi film industry, through workshops, funding and training. In 2020, some films funded by Ithra were shown on Netflix as part of a content-sharing deal. These films were Wasati, directed by Ali Kalthami; Is Sumyati Going to Hell?, directed by Mishaal Aljaser; and Predicament in Sight, directed by Faris Godos.

Ithra has also produced the feature film Hajjan, which premiered at Toronto International Film Festival, and was directed by Yomeddine director Abu Bakr Shawky. The film is influenced by American Westerns and is a coming of age story about a young man's camel race in Saudi Arabia.

=== Energy Exhibit ===
This exhibition is an introduction to the oil industry, energy – including renewables – ecology and technology.

=== Ithra Library ===
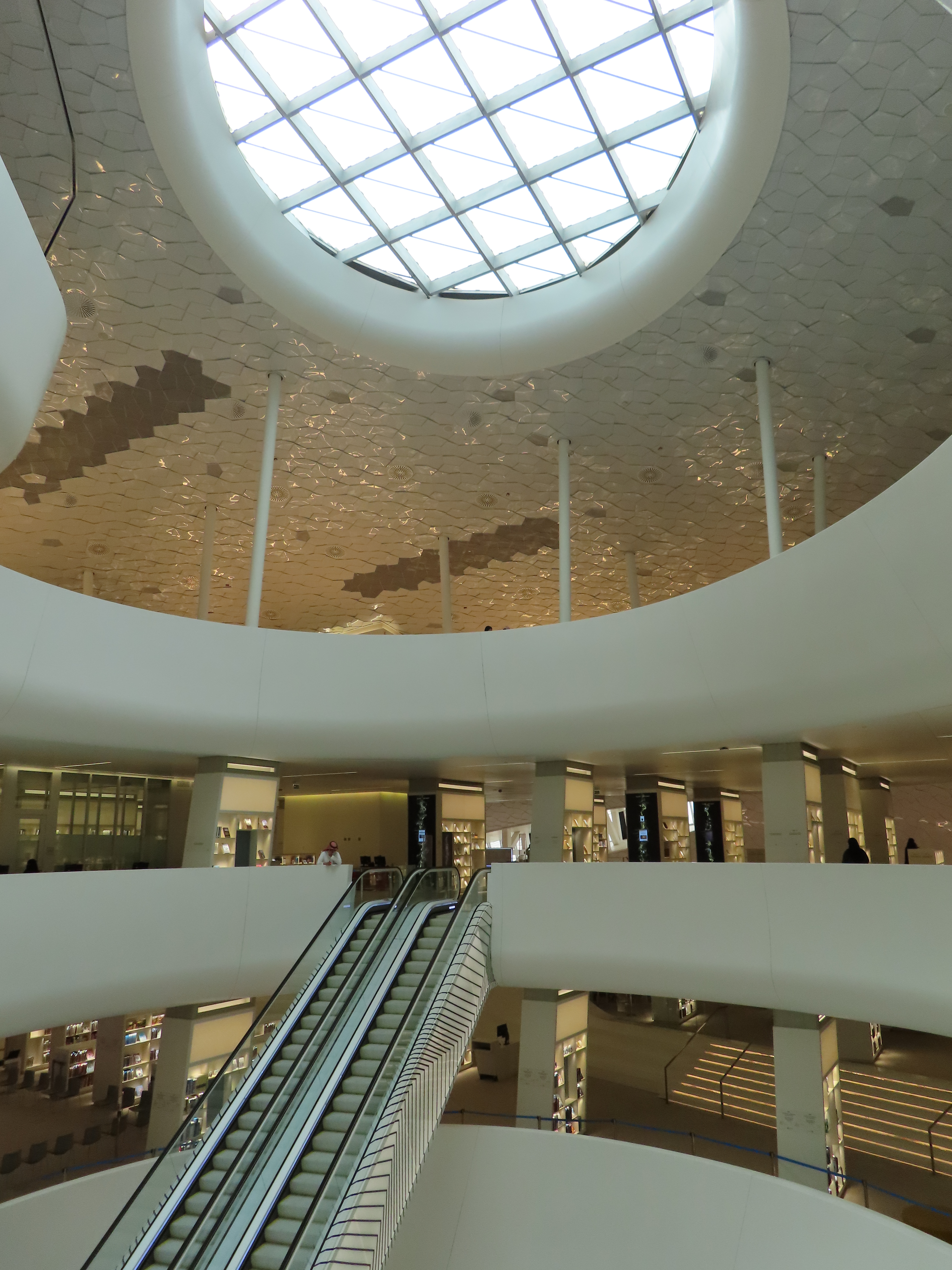
Ithra Library

The library is one of the larger and more modern in the region. It is designed to host about 500,000 texts and includes a variety of digital resources. The library also hosts workshops, lectures and book clubs.

=== Theater ===
In addition to hosting performances, the theater also organizes events intended to develop theater in Saudi Arabia, such as coaching and workshops. The theater is equipped with 900 seats occupying a total area of 10,000 square meters. The theater displays local and international plays and it offers theatrical training workshops.

== Collections and publications ==
Museum collections

Ithra has a small but growing collection of rare objects, some of which are on display. These include a folio from the Blue Qur’an as well as a fragment of a manuscript of the Holy Qur’an from about 750 CE.

Publications

The King Abdulaziz Center for World Culture has conducted and published research. In 2015, the center published a research report under the title "Reading and the Knowledge Society", which sought to analyze Saudi reading habits. The research was carried out in conjunction with the Arrowad group.

== See also ==
- List of things named after Saudi kings
- Tourism in Saudi Arabia
- Cinema of Saudi Arabia
