= Hajjan =

- Directed by: Abu Bakr Shawky
- Written by: Mufarrej Al-Mujfel, Omar Shama
- Release dates: 10 September 2023 (Toronto International Film Festival); 18 January 2024 (Saudi Arabia)
- Running time: 117 minutes
- Country: Saudi Arabia
- Language: Arabic

Hajjan (Arabic: هجان) is a Saudi Arabian film that premiered at the 48th Toronto International Film Festival in September 2023. Starring Abdulmohsen Alnemr, the film is directed by Egyptian Austrian filmmaker Abu Bakr Shawky and produced by the King Abdulaziz Center for World Culture (Ithra). The screenplay was written by Mufarrej Al-Mujfel and Omar Shama.

== Plot ==
Hajjan follows the journey of a young boy named Matir, who embarks on a path of self-discovery driven by his passion for camels. Unexpectedly thrust into the world of camel racing, he finds himself caught in a struggle for freedom and truth. Now, he must fight with all his strength to survive.

== Cast ==
- Abdulmohsen Alnemr
- Ibrahim Al-Hsawi
- Mohammed Al-Zahrani
- Omar Al-Atwi
- Alshaimaa Tayeb
- Azzam Al-Nemer
- Tuline Barboud
- Mohammed Hilal
