= Rammbock: Berlin Undead =

Rammbock
- Directed by: Marvin Kren
- Screenplay by: Benjamin Hessler
- Produced by: Sigrid Hoerner
- Starring: Michael Fuith; Theo Trebs; Anka Graczyk; Emily Cox
- Cinematography: Moritz Schultheiß
- Edited by: Silke Olthoff
- Music by: Marco Dreckkötter; Stefan Will
- Production companies: ZDF; Das Kleine Fernsehspiel; Moneypenny Filmproduktion
- Distributed by: Filmgalerie 451
- Release date: January 19, 2010 (Max Ophüls Preis Film Festival)
- Running time: 63 minutes
- Country: Germany
- Language: German

Rammbock (also Rammbock: Berlin Undead and Siege of the Dead) is a 2010 German horror film directed by Marvin Kren, written by Benjamin Hessler, and starring Michael Fuith, Theo Trebs, Anka Graczyk, and Emily Cox as survivors of a rage virus in Berlin. Besides its native Germany, it was theatrically released in Austria, the UK, and the US.

== Plot ==
Michael, who has recently broken up with Gabi, visits her Berlin apartment to return her keys and hoping to save their relationship. He finds two repairmen there, but Gabi has gone outside and they do not know where. As Michael attempts to contact Gabi, a rage virus transforms people into bloodthirsty cannibals, and the older repairmen attacks Michael. As Berlin falls into chaos, Michael and the younger repairman, named Harper, barricade themselves in the apartment complex and brace for an attack. The pair attempt to make contact with the other inhabitants of the apartment complex.

Following news reports, they find out that the rage virus is only activated after the victim undergoes agitation or adrenaline, and it can be subdued by remaining calm or using sedatives. Michael makes a deal with another resident to retrieve some sedatives from another apartment which the resident needs for his sick wife. Michael eventually stumbles upon Gabi but he finds out that she is in another relationship with her neighbor and it was her reason for breaking up with him. Harper discovers that the infected are photosensitive to camera flashes. Michael, Harper, and another resident, Anita, attempt to break out of the apartment building using cameras and flood lights but are forced to abandon Michael who reveals he has been bitten. Michael quickly helps Harper and Anita attach the cameras to a bicycle so they can pedal to the harbour and use the camera flashes to ward off the infected. Michael remains behind in the square and realizes that he has a sedative left and if he takes it there is a chance he may not transform. However just as he is about to take the sedative he sees a now-infected Gabi emerging from the building. He decides not to take the sedative and transforms just as Gabi is about to attack him and the two embrace. Harper and Anita make it to the harbour and escape on a boat.

== Cast ==
- Michael Fuith as Michael
- Theo Trebs as Harper
- Anka Graczyk as Gabi
- Emily Cox as Anita
- Andreas Schröders as Ulf
- Katelijne Philips-Lebon as Heike
- Steffen Münster as Klaus
- Brigitte Kren as Frau Bramkamp
- Sebastian Achilles as Kai
- Jörn Hentschel as Dominik
- Katharina Rivilis as Semra
- Harald Geil as Thorsten
- Arno Kölker as handyman
- Carsten Behrendt as Manni

== Production ==
On 21 October 2009, it was reported that ZDF had begun production on the film the day before.

== Release ==
Rammbock premiered at the Max Ophüls Preis Film Festival in Saarbrücken on 19 January 2010. It premiered internationally at the 2010 Locarno Festival and played theatrically in Germany and Austria in September 2010. It was released in the UK in October 2010. Bloody Disgusting and The Collective released it in the United States in June 2011.

== Reception ==
Rotten Tomatoes, a review aggregator, reports that 89% of nine surveyed reviews are positive.

Boyd van Hoeij of Variety called it "singular enough to please more than just die-hard zombie fans". G. Allen Johnson of the San Francisco Chronicle rated it 4/5 stars and called it "intriguing and skillfully made". Sifu Scott, also of Dread Central, rated it 4/5 stars and wrote that the film uses many familiar zombie tropes, but the execution makes it a film "not to be missed." Gareth Jones of Dread Central rated it 3.5/5 stars and wrote that the story, characters, and performances make up for the lack of gore and derivative setup. Marc Savlov of the Austin Chronicle rated it 3/5 stars and wrote that "although it adds little to the already overflowing canon of zombie-genre tropes, its brief running time is chock-full o' guts." Scott Weinberg of Fearnet called it "compelling but slightly unsatisfying". James Mudge of Beyond Hollywood wrote that the film distinguishes itself only by its German setting.

In 2016, Jim Vorel of Paste ranked the film at #27 on its list of "The 50 Best Zombie Movies of All Time", and ranked film at #28 on its 2020 updated article. In 2017, Gem Seddon of GamesRadar+ ranked the film at #22 on its list of "The 25 Best Zombie Movies That Will Turn You Veggie". Tim Dirks of Filmsite included the film in its list of "Greatest Zombie Films: 2010s".

On 24 January 2010, it won the award for "Best Medium-Length Film" at the Max Ophüls Preis Film Festival. In November 2011, Silke Olthoff won the Schnitt Prize for her editing on the film.
