= Silke Olthoff =

German film editor

Silke Olthoff (born 28 June 1972) is a German film editor of feature films and documentaries.

== Life and work ==
After studying philosophy and film studies in Bochum and London, Silke Olthoff started editing short films, television productions and feature films.

Among other projects, she worked on two films by award-winning director Marvin Kren. For Schautag, she received the German Cinematography Award for best editing in 2009. She also edited Kren's feature film debut Rammbock: Berlin Undead, which won the Audience Award as "Best Medium-Length Film" at the 2010 Max Ophüls Film Festival in Saarbrücken. The film subsequently screened at the 63rd Locarno Film Festival and the Diagonale in Graz, where it received an honorable mention for Best Editing.

Olthoff then edited the feature film 45 Minutes to Ramallah by German-Iranian film director Ali Samadi Ahadi.

Olthoff has edited several documentaries for journalist Stephan Lamby, including 2018's Nervous Republic - One Year In Germany, which won the German Television Award as best documentary.

She also worked on the feature film Goliath96 by director Marcus Richardt, which screened at the 2018 Hof International Film Festival and the 2019 Max Ophüls Film Festival, as well as on the short film Kippa (2019), which won the European Civis Media Prize.

In 2019, Olthoff edited the feature film Sleep by director Michael Venus, which premiered in the Perspektive Deutsches Kino section of the Berlin International Film Festival 2020 and was selected for the New Directors Competition at the Chicago International Film Festival in 2020.

Olthoff lives in Hamburg.
