= Morbus Dei =

Novel series by Bastian Zach and Matthias Bauer

- Author: Bastian Zach, Matthias Bauer
- Translator: Claire Speringer
- Language: German
- Publisher: Haymon Verlag
- ISBN: 978-3-7099-3631-3

Morbus Dei is a series of three historical mystery thriller novels written by Bastian Zach and Matthias Bauer. All three books were first published in German language by Austrian publishing house Haymon Verlag. In 2015 the trilogy was translated into English by Claire Speringer and published as E-Books by Haymon Verlag.

== Synopsis ==
=== Morbus Dei: The Arrival ===
The story is set in the late 17th and the beginning 18th century. Getting caught in a snowstorm, deserter Johann List ends up in a secluded mountain village ridden by fear and superstition. Soon he realises that there is something wrong with this village, that it lies beneath a grim shadow – animals get killed, people disappear, hooded shapes lurk in the dark woods. When Johann falls in love with the farmer's daughter Elisabeth, they decide to leave the village together. But even before they are able to elope, the situation escalates – a life and death struggle begins.

=== Morbus Dei: Inferno ===
Tyrol, 1704: Johann and Elisabeth flee from the eerie mountain village and beat their way to Vienna. Due to snow, icy cold and dangerous bandits their journey is a risky undertaking. When they finally reach their designation, their shared future seems to be within their grasp – until enemies from Johann's past emerge. To make matters worse, a mysterious disease is suddenly spreading and covers the city like a shroud. The old imperial city becomes a death trap from which there seems to be no escape ...

=== Morbus Dei: The Sign of Aries ===
Austria, 1704: The young woman Elisabeth is trapped in the hands of the French general Gamelin who pursues dark plans – plans that not only endanger her, but also the whole Habsburg Empire. Only one man can avert the calamity: Johann List, who loves Elisabeth and would rather die than giving her up. A fatal chase takes its course and leads through inhospitable valleys and secret abbeys of the old empire to the mighty fortress of Turin – and on into the deep heart of the Alps.

== Production history ==
After several short movies and the independent film 3 Zimmer. Küche. Tod. Morbus Dei was planned as the first commercial movie project by Bastian Zach and Matthias Bauer. After the screenplay was completed, the venture failed in spite of the commitment of a renowned production company. Zach/Bauer adapted the script and put forth the novel Morbus Dei: Die Ankunft (engl.: Morbus Dei: The Arrival), published in 2010 by Haymon Verlag. The novel acquired critical acclaim and was well received both by readers and journalists. The sequel Morbus Dei: Inferno (engl.: Morbus Dei: Inferno) was published in 2012, experienced widespread recognition and press coverage. The third book of the series and finale of the trilogy, Morbus Dei: Im Zeichen des Aries (engl.: Morbus Dei: The Sign of Aries), was released in autumn 2013. Apart from their novels Bastian Zach and Matthias Bauer are working on screenplays for feature films, amongst others the horror movie One Way Trip 3D (CH/AT 2011) and the international Viking movie Northmen: A Viking Saga.

== The series in chronological order ==
- Morbus Dei: The Arrival, Haymon Publishing 2015, ca. 264 pages, ISBN 978-3-7099-3631-3
- Morbus Dei: Inferno, Haymon Publishing 2015, ca. 368 pages, ISBN 978-3-7099-3632-0
- Morbus Dei: The Sign of Aries, Haymon Publishing 2015, ca. 400 pages, ISBN 978-3-7099-3633-7
