= Fall for Me =

2025 film by Sherry Hormann

- Release poster
- Directed by: Sherry Hormann
- Written by: Stefanie Sycholt
- Produced by: Christina Henne; Quirin Berg; Max Wiedemann
- Starring: Svenja Jung; Theo Trebs
- Cinematography: Marc Achenbach
- Edited by: Elena Schmidt; Antje Zynga
- Music by: Martin Todsharow
- Production company: W&B Television
- Distributed by: Netflix
- Release date: 21 August 2025
- Running time: 105 minutes
- Country: Germany
- Languages: German; Spanish

Fall for Me is a 2025 German erotic thriller film directed by Sherry Hormann and written by Stefanie Sycholt. Produced by W&B Television, the film stars Svenja Jung and Theo Trebs.

When Lilli visits her sister Valeria in Mallorca, Spain, she is surprised to find her engaged to Manu, while she herself instantly connects with nightclub manager Tom. However, events soon take a dark turn.

Principal photography commenced in May 2024 in Mallorca and took 36 working days to complete. The film was released on Netflix on 21 August 2025.

== Plot ==
German auditor Lilli Funke travels to Mallorca to visit her younger sister Valeria "Valle". There, she soon learns she is engaged to Frenchman Manu Chassée, whom she met four and a half months earlier, and they are planning to open a bed and breakfast (B&B) together. In a nightclub, Lilli meets bartender and club manager Tom Sommer, also from Germany. The two begin an affair.

Valle and Manu want to buy his uncle's property for the B&B. She has €40,000 for this from her mother's inheritance, money originally intended for her university education. Valle also wants to sell the property she inherited from her mother, half of which is owned by her sister, who opposes the sale. Soon afterwards, Lilli meets real estate investor Nick Unterwalt, who offers €900,000 for the property.

Lilli's mother was from Mallorca and died when Lilli was 18, while Valle was 10. Manu's ex-girlfriend Bea suddenly shows up. Lilli discovers that Manu does not work at the Hotel Mirabelle as claimed and fears he is just trying to exploit Valle. He claims to have been made redundant when the hotel changed ownership.

Tom arranges for an appraiser, who estimates the value of the property at €700,000. He advises Lilli to accept Unterwalt's offer, and she agrees. When she has a broken water pipe repaired at the house, the repairman tells her it had been tampered with.

Lilli then visits Bea to hear her side of the story. Bea reveals that Manu has scammed her out of a lot of money and is now trying the same trick on Valeria. Lilli confronts her sister with the fact that Manu is a fraud, but Valle refuses to believe her.

Manu expresses his joy to Tom that the sisters have agreed to the sale to their mutual client, Unterwalt, and that he will soon be rid of Valeria. Through Unterwalt's employee, Lilli inadvertently discovers the property meant for the B&B does not actually belong to his uncle and is not for sale. Furthermore, a luxury resort is planned for construction on their property, and all investors are already on board.

Lilli shows up at Unterwalt's eight-year-old daughter's birthday party at his estate, where she encounters Manu, Valle, Tom, and the "appraiser". Realising it has all been a scam, Lilli confronts Unterwalt with the fact that the property is worth far more than the €900,000 being offered.

In Tom's belongings, Lilli finds an envelope addressed to his real name, Tobias Winter. On his laptop, she also finds a folder marked "LF", containing documents and photos of Lilli and Valeria. When confronted with this, Tom asserts that not everything was a lie.

As Valle begins to have doubts about Manu, she visits Bea and finds her dead in a bathtub. The police suspect suicide. Meanwhile, Tom confesses to Lilli that he was responsible for the burst water pipe. He also orchestrated the theft of her handbag at the nightclub.

After Unterwalt puts pressure on his wife Girasol, she tries to force Lilli to sign the purchase agreement, while Manu threatens her with a gun. (It is apparent that Girasol is controlling the two male expats.) Tom surprises everyone by disarming him and jumps off a cliff into the sea with Lilli. The police, called by Tom, arrest Manu and Girasol.

A year later, Lilli returns to Mallorca, where Valle has since opened a B&B, and Lilli reunites with Tom.

== Cast ==
- Svenja Jung as Lilli
- Theo Trebs as Tom
- Thomas Kretschmann as Nick
- Tijan Marei as Valeria
- Victor Meutelet as Manu
- Antje Traue as Bea
- Lucía Barrado as Girasol

== Production ==
=== Development ===
The film was officially commissioned by Netflix, with Sherry Hormann serving as director and the script is penned by Stefanie Sycholt, while W&B Television managed the production.

=== Casting ===
Svenja Jung, Theo Trebs, Thomas Kretschmann, Tijan Marei, Victor Meutelet, Antje Traue and Lucía Barrado were confirmed to appear in the film.

=== Filming ===
Principal photography of the film commenced in May 2024 and filming ended in July 2024. The filming took place in Mallorca.

== Music ==
Fall for Me

Soundtrack album by Martin Todsharow
- Released: August 22, 2025
- Genre: Soundtrack
- Length: 44:32

The soundtrack for Fall for Me is composed by Martin Todsharow.

Fall for Me (Soundtrack from the Netflix Film) track listing
| No. | Title | Length |
|---|---|---|
| 1. | "Fall for Me – Epilogue" | 1:28 |
| 2. | "The Garden" | 0:53 |
| 3. | "Lillis Arriving" | 1:21 |
| 4. | "First Meeting" | 1:23 |
| 5. | "Ice Cold" | 1:33 |
| 6. | "Fall for Me - Do You Dare" | 1:06 |
| 7. | "When Will You Finally Understand" | 1:19 |
| 8. | "You Have to Do This" | 0:47 |
| 9. | "Door Opener" | 0:58 |
| 10. | "Lillis Surprise" | 0:56 |
| 11. | "Who Is Bea" | 1:35 |
| 12. | "What's Next" | 1:09 |
| 13. | "Better Not to Know" | 0:40 |
| 14. | "I Want You to Do More" | 1:08 |
| 15. | "The Mirabelle" | 1:54 |
| 16. | "This Is Lilli" | 2:40 |
| 17. | "Forbidden Love" | 2:01 |
| 18. | "Catching Fire" | 1:44 |
| 19. | "It Was Tinkered" | 1:06 |
| 20. | "Enemies Now" | 1:11 |
| 21. | "What Are You Planning Now" | 1:35 |
| 22. | "Come with Me" | 1:02 |
| 23. | "Now Everything Makes Sense" | 1:09 |
| 24. | "Good Luck with That" | 2:56 |
| 25. | "Girasols Intrigues" | 4:04 |
| 26. | "A Good Scammer" | 4:18 |
| 27. | "Fall for Me" | 2:36 |
| Total length: | | 44:32 |

== Release ==
Fall for Me was released on Netflix on 21 August 2025.

== Reception ==
Omar Larabi of BNNVARA rated the film two stars out of five.
