= One Way Trip =

One Way Trip may refer to:

- One Way Trip 3D, a 2011 film
- One Way Trip (film), a 2015 film
