= Dina Emam =

Egyptian-American filmmaker

- Born: Dina Emam; Alexandria, Egypt
- Education: New York University, Columbia University
- Occupation: Filmmaker
- Years active: 2011 - present
- Known for: Yomeddine (2018)
- Website: www.dinaemam.com

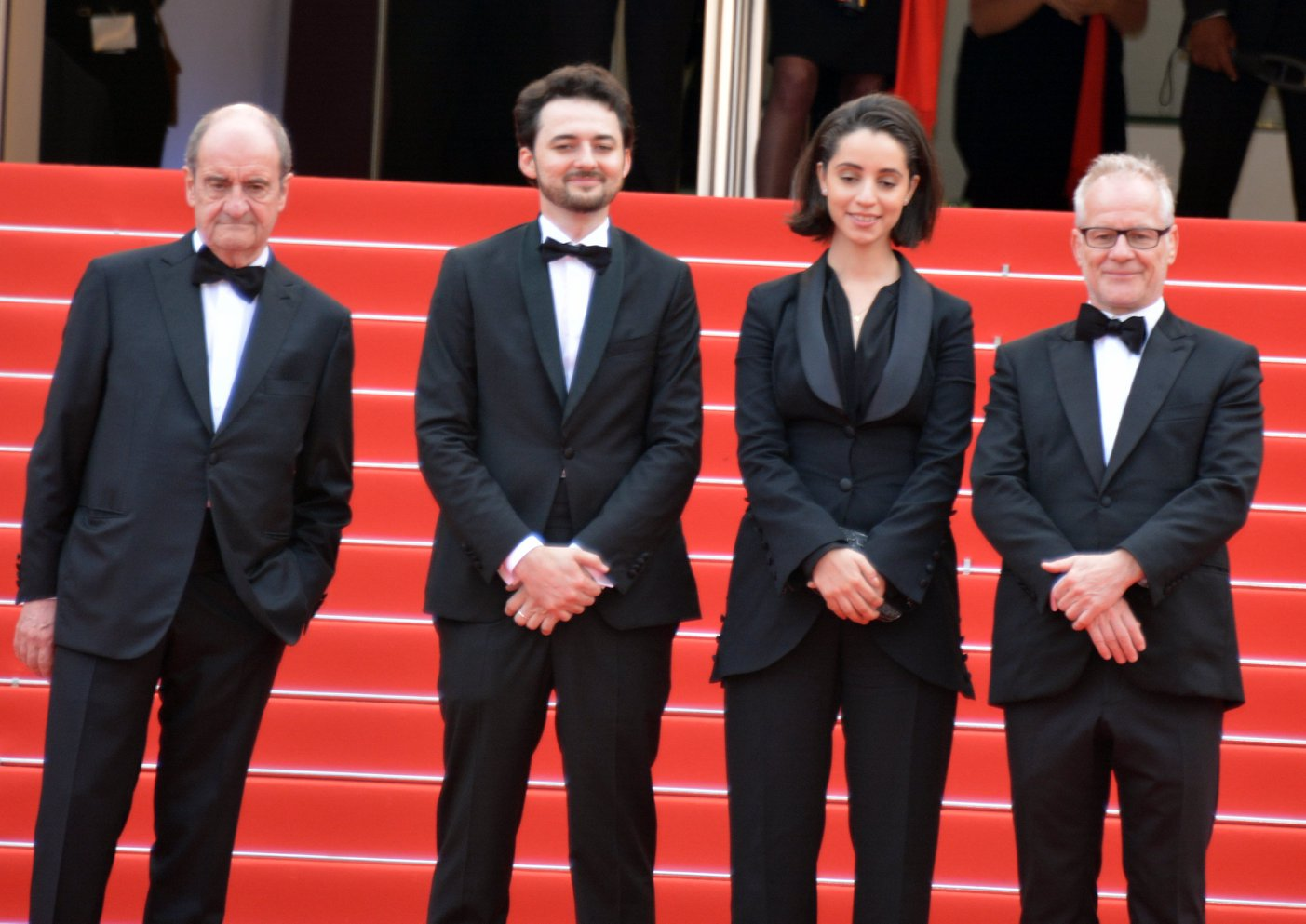
Dina Emam in festival de Cannes 2018

Dina Emam is an Egyptian-American film producer. She was named Variety magazine's 10 Producers to Watch in 2018. She lives in Cairo and New York City.

== Education ==
She graduated from the Columbia University with an MFA in Creative Producing.

== Early life ==
Emam was born in Alexandria, Egypt and raised in Brooklyn, NY.

== Career ==
Emam previously worked at MTV Networks, New York City, in Television Market Research and Production Management.

In 2018, the film she produced titled, Yomeddine, premiered at the Cannes Film Festival in France, where it won the Francois Chalais Prize. Both she and the film's director/writer, Abu Bakr (A.B.) Shawky were present earlier to graze the occasion. The film later became Egypt's official selection in the Best Foreign-Language Film category for the 2019 Academy Award. She also participated in the El-Gouna International Film Festival (GIFF) 2018 press conference.

She served in the 36th Cairo International Film Festival as the Assistant Artistic Director and as a moderator at the 2019 Cairo Film Festival Industry Days on the topic, "Is There Life After Co-Production?".

== Filmography ==
Year	Film	Role	Notes	Ref.
2018	Yomeddine	Producer		
2015	I Say Dust	Producer	Short film	
