= Valerie Pachner =

Austrian actress (born 1987)

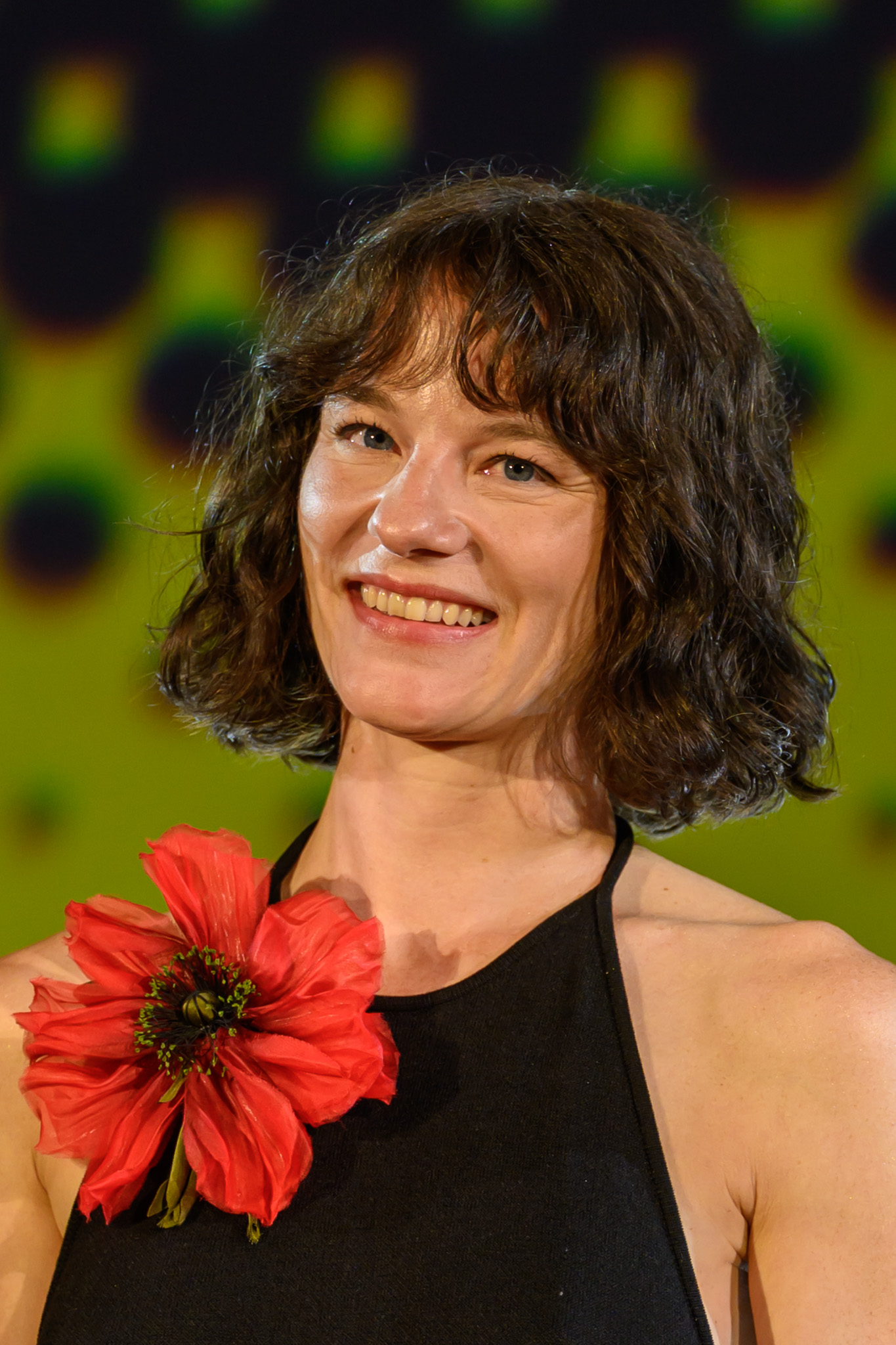
- Pachner in 2026
- Born: 26 June 1987 (age 39); Wels, Austria
- Occupation: Actress
- Height: 5 ft 6 in (168 cm)

Valerie Pachner (born 26 June 1987) is an Austrian actress.

== Life and work ==
Valerie Pachner grew up in Bad Schallerbach, Austria, and studied acting at the Max Reinhardt Seminar in Vienna from 2009 to 2013. She was then part of the ensemble cast at the Residenztheater in Munich, under artistic director Martin Kušej until 2017. Her work on stage was awarded twice in 2016.

Pachner starred as the female lead in the 2015 film Bad Luck (directed by Thomas Woschitz), which was nominated for the Max-Ophüls-Preis. After that she appeared in Elisabeth Scharang's Jack and Maria Schrader's biopic of the Austrian writer Stefan Zweig, Vor der Morgenröte (Stefan Zweig: Farewell to Europe), playing Zweig's stepdaughter alongside Barbara Sukowa and Josef Hader as Zweig.

For her portrayal of Egon Schiele's muse Wally Neuzil in Dieter Berner's Egon Schiele: Death and the Maiden she was awarded the Austrian Film Award and the Romy.

In 2019 The Ground Beneath My Feet by Marie Kreutzer was selected to compete for the Golden Bear at the 69th Berlin International Film Festival. Pachner's leading performance was critically acclaimed internationally and earned her three awards, including the German Acting Award for Best Actress. The film had a limited theatrical release in the U.S. and was named one of The 10 Best Movies of 2019 by Vanity Fair.

The same year, Terrence Malick's A Hidden Life with Pachner playing the female lead, Franziska Jägerstätter, premiered in competition at the 72nd Cannes Film Festival. It was also shown at the Toronto International Film Festival, the Telluride Film Festival and the Deauville American Film Festival. IndieWire called her performance as one of the best by an actress in 2019.

In 2022, Pachner appeared as Henrietta Fischer in Fantastic Beasts: The Secrets of Dumbledore. In 2026, Pachner appeared for the first time in Egyptian cinema, starring as Elizabeth in The Stories by Abu Bakr Shawky, an Egyptian anthology film in which she appeared alongside Amir El-Masry, and Nelly Karim. In September 2026, the film was selected as the Egyptian entry in the 99th Academy Awards.

== Filmography ==
=== Film ===
Year	Title	Role	Director	Notes
2013	Tuppern	Caro	Vanessa Gräfingholt	Short film
2013	Liebemacht	Nastija	Dieter Berner	
2015	Bad Luck	Dagmar	Thomas Woschitz	
2015	Jack	Marlene	Elisabeth Scharang	
2016	Stefan Zweig: Farewell to Europe	Alix Störk	Maria Schrader	
2016	Egon Schiele: Death and the Maiden	Wally Neuzil	Dieter Berner	
2019	The Ground Beneath My Feet	Lola Wegenstein	Marie Kreutzer	
2019	All My Loving	Klara	Edward Berger	
2019	A Hidden Life	Franziska Jägerstätter	Terrence Malick	
2021	Another Coin for the Merry-Go-Round	Anna	Hannes Starz	
2021	The King's Man	Mata Hari	Matthew Vaughn	
2022	Fantastic Beasts: The Secrets of Dumbledore	Henrietta Fischer	David Yates	
2025	Delicious	Esther	Nele Mueller-Stöfen	It will be screened in Panorama at the 75th Berlin International Film Festival in February 2025.
2026	Four Minus Three	Barbara	Adrian Goiginger	Austrian Drama
2026	The Stories	Elizabeth	Abu Bakr Shawky	Egyptian-Austrian Drama

=== Television ===
Year	Title	Role	Director	Notes
2019	Bauhaus - A New Era	Gunta Stölzl	Lars Kraume	Main role; 6 episodes
2022	The English	Martha Myers	Hugo Blick	Main role; 3 episodes

== Theatre ==
Year	Title	Role(s)	Director	Venue
2010	The Shape of Things	TBA	Holle Münster	Max Reinhardt Seminar
2010	Mozart and Salieri	TBA	Josua Rösing	Max Reinhardt Seminar
2011	Die Nibelungen	Kriemhild	Holle Münster	Max Reinhardt Seminar
2011	Anywhere but Here	TBA	Hannan Ishay	Sommerakademie Reichenau
2012	The Brothers Karamazov	Agrafena Alexandrovna Svetlova / "Grushenka"	Josua Rösing	Max Reinhardt Seminar
2013	The Snow Queen	The Princess / The Little Robber Girl	Samuel Weiss	Residence Theatre
2013	Orestes	Chrysothemis / Hermione	David Bösch	Residence Theatre
2013	Räuber.Schuldengenital	Petra	Alex Riemenschneider	Residence Theatre
2015	Hoppla, We're Alive!	Eva Berg	Anne Lenk	Residence Theatre
2015	Three Sisters	Irina Sergeyevna Prozorova	Tina Lanik	Residence Theatre
2015	Antony and Cleopatra	Iras	Thomas Dannemann	Residence Theatre
2015	Opening Night: Alles über Laura	Nancy / Hannah	Bernhard Mikeska	Residence Theatre
2016	The Crucible	Mary Warren	Tina Lanik	Residence Theatre
2016	Faith, Hope and Charity	Elisabeth	David Bösch	Residence Theatre
2017	Foxfinder	Judith Covey	Mirjam Loibl	Residence Theatre

== Awards ==
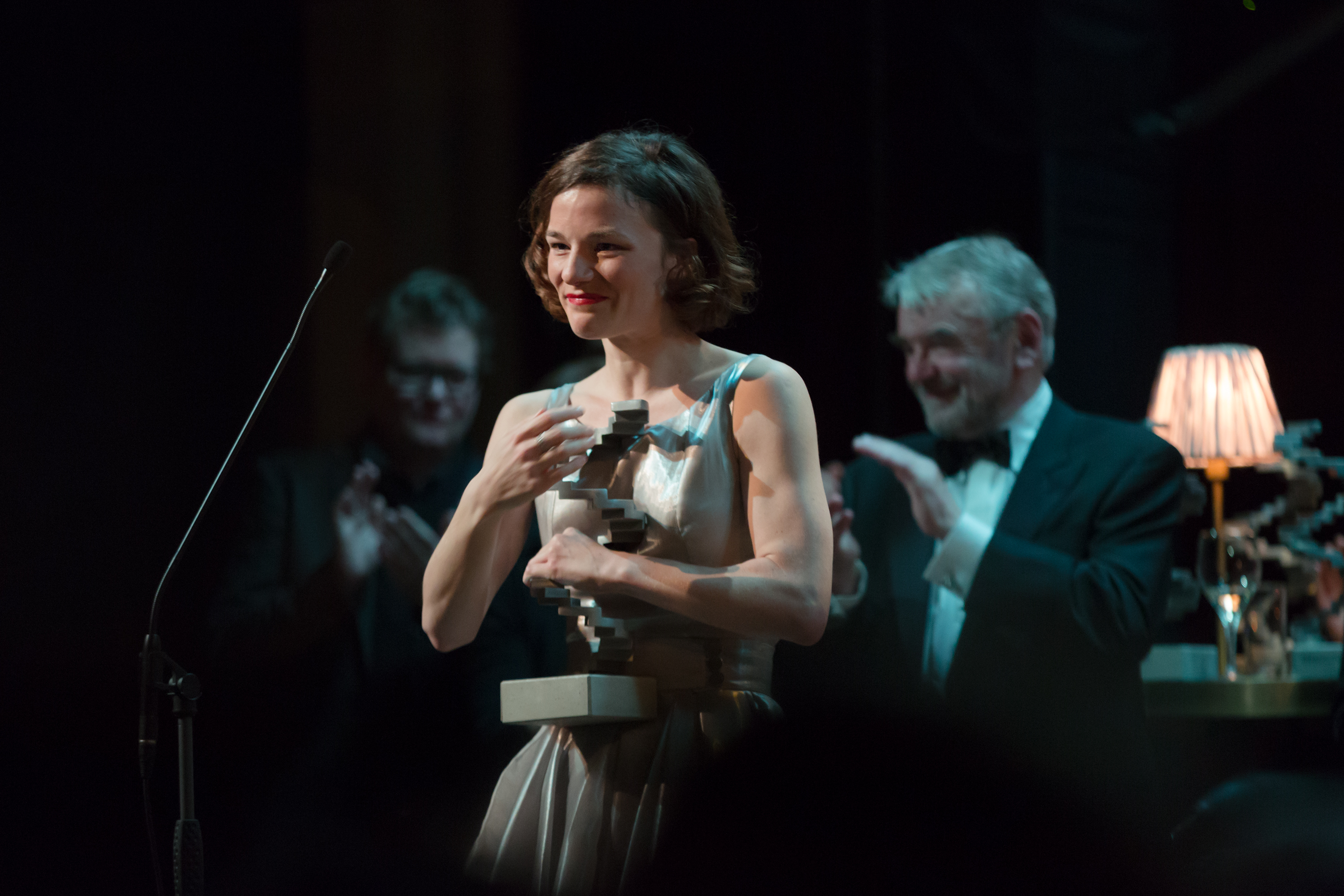
Valerie Pachner with the Austrian Film Award 2017

- 2004: Best Performance by a Young Actress (YOUKI)
- 2016: Förderpreis der Freunde des Residenztheaters
- 2016: Bayerischer Kunstförderpreis for Performing Arts
- 2017: Austrian Film Award (Best Actress)
- 2017: Romy (most popular shooting star, female)
- 2019: Best Performance by a young actress at the Filmkunstfest Mecklenburg-Vorpommern
- 2019: Premio Maguey: Best Performance at the Guadalajara International Film Festival
- 2019: German Acting Award for Best Actress Deutscher Schauspielpreis
- 2019: Discovery Award at the SCAD Filmfestival Savannah College of Art and Design
