= The Stories (film) =

2025 film by Abu Bakr Shawky

- International promotional poster
- Egyptian Arabic: القِصَص
- Directed by: Abu Bakr Shawky
- Written by: Abu Bakr Shawky
- Produced by: Alexander Glehr; Olivier Guerpillon; Mohamed Hefzy; Julie Viez
- Starring: Amir El-Masry; Valerie Pachner; Nelly Karim
- Cinematography: Wolfgang Thaler
- Edited by: Roland Stöttinger
- Production companies: Cinenovo; Film Clinic; Lagoonie Film Production; Film Square; Shofha Productions; Film AG; Fox in the Snow; Wrong Men
- Release dates: 16 November 2025 (PÖFF); 16 June 2026 (Egypt); 10 July 2026 (France)
- Running time: 101 minutes
- Countries: Egypt; France; Austria; Belgium; Sweden
- Languages: Egyptian Arabic; English; German

The Stories (Egyptian Arabic: القِصَص) is a 2025 Egyptian drama film written and directed by Abu Bakr Shawky, and loosely based on the Shawky’s parents. A co-production of Egypt, France, Austria, Belgium, and Sweden, it follows interconnected episodes tracing relationship between an Egyptian man and an Austrian woman, unfolding across different periods of their lives against shifting historical and political backdrops. It stars Amir El-Masry, Nelly Karim, and Valerie Pachner, among others.

The film had its world premiere at the Tallinn Black Nights Film Festival in November 2025. It went on to win the Golden Tanit for Best Film at the Carthage Film Festival and also screened at festivals including the Red Sea International Film Festival. It later screened at the Cabourg Film Festival in June 2026, before receiving theatrical releases in Egypt on 16 June 2026.

It was also selected as the Egyptian entry for the Best International Feature Film at the 99th Academy Awards.

== Structure ==
The film tells five different stories, surrounding Ahmed and Elizabeth, and mixes "archival footage of political speeches, soccer matches, film clips and radio transmissions with acted scenes." It is based on the story of how Shawky's parents—his Egyptian father and Austrian mother—met, wrote to each other as international pen pals, and fell in love in the seventies.

== Plot ==
The Stories follows Ahmed, a young Egyptian man growing up in Cairo within a middle class family passionately devoted to the football club Zamalek. While his family is absorbed by sport and everyday concerns, Ahmed is drawn to music and aspires to compose simple national marches that reflect a renewed Egyptian identity under President Gamal Abdel Nasser Pan-Arabism.

After the aftermath of the 1967 attack, Ahmed begins a long-distance correspondence with Elizabeth, an Austrian woman with whom he forms an intimate emotional connection through letters.

He later travels to Vienna to study classical music, leaving behind his family, including his younger brother, who joins the Egyptian army. In Vienna, Ahmed and Elizabeth’s relationship becomes physical but increasingly complicated by cultural differences, emotional distance, and Ahmed’s sense of displacement between Egypt and Europe, a meeting with Vladimir Horowitz changes his perspective on life.

Following the 1973 October War, Egypt crosses the Suez Canal and reclaims Sinai, restoring a sense of national pride. This historical turning point deepens Ahmed’s internal conflict as he is pulled between personal ambition and national identity, he return to Egypt after learning of a family misfortune, Elizabeth decide to join him later.

In the mid 1970s, Egypt abandon socialism and pan-Arabism and starts the period of Sadat’s economic openness (Infitah), rising inequality leads to widespread unrest, culminating in the 1977 bread riots in Cairo. The political and social turbulence further strains Ahmed’s personal relationships and artistic direction.

Following the assassination of President Anwar El Sadat, Egypt enters a new political era under Mubarak. Elizabeth is revealed to be pregnant, while Ahmed’s life gradually comes full circle. Zamalek finally achieves victory, echoing his family’s long-standing obsession. In a quiet resolution, Ahmed fulfills his aspiration of playing a concert, completing his personal and artistic journey.

== Cast ==
- Amir El-Masry as Ahmad
- Valerie Pachner as Elizabeth
- Nelly Karim as Fairouz
- Ahmed Kamal as Ragheb
- Johannes Krisch as Elizabeth's father
- Karim Qassem as Shams
- Jack Hofer as Elizabeth's Brother
- Ahmed El Azaar as Hasan
- Nagui Chehata as Sabri
- Amr Abed as Lulu
- Khaled Mokhtar as Sharaf
- Maria Hofstätter as Elizabeth's mother
- Sabry Fawaz as Hamada
- Sherif Desouqy as Maraai
- Osama Abdullah as Labib
- Hassan Eladl as Dawod
- Sarah Abdelrahman as TV Presenter

Shawky's real-life parents cameo as the couple taking a photograph in Vienna. the Character of Ahmad encounter real life figures as Vladimir Horowitz and Hosni Mubarak.

== Production ==
The film is a majoritarian co-production between Austria, Egypt, and France, produced by Cinenovo and Film Clinic, with support from several international and Austrian funding bodies, including ÖFI, ÖFI+, Filmfonds Wien, and the Austrian Film Institute. Additional backing came from the Doha Film Institute, Red Sea Fund, Film i Väst, and Région Île-de-France, along with television investment. It was shot in Egypt and Austria over 36 days between July and September 2024.

== Release ==
The Stories had its world premiere in the Official Competition of the 29th Tallinn Black Nights Film Festival (PÖFF) in Estonia on 16 November 2025. Director Abu Bakr Shawky attended the premiere alongside producer Julie Viez and cast member Valerie Pachner, participating in a post-screening Q&A. The film later screened in the Panorama section of the Cabourg Film Festival on 10 June 2026 under its French title Notre histoire – Chroniques du Caire. It was released theatrically in Egypt on 16 June 2026 before opening in French cinemas on 10 July 2026.

The Stories premiered theatrically in Egypt on 17 June 2026, followed by a wider release on 18 June. While the film generated considerable anticipation due to its acclaimed festival run and Abu Bakr Shawky's return to Egyptian cinema, its domestic commercial performance proved modest, consistently ranking around fifth at the Egyptian box office during its opening weeks. Nevertheless, audience reactions were largely positive, with viewers praising its nostalgic portrayal of Egypt between the late 1960s and 1980s, its emotional storytelling, musical score, and performances by Amir El Masry and Nelly Karim, despite some criticism of its leisurely pace and anthology structure. In France, however, the film enjoyed a notably stronger reception, reaching fifth place at the national box office during its theatrical run and receiving widespread critical acclaim.

== Music ==
The film’s soundtrack includes Egyptian and European music tracing the evolution of music from the 1960s to the 1980s, combining popular, national, and classical pieces to reflect each era’s mood and social atmosphere. It includes:

- “Zahma” – Ahmed Adaweya
- “Al Watan Al Akbar” – Various artists (national operetta)
- “Ziwui Ziwui” - Wilfried
- “El Donia Soghayara” – Thebes Band
- “Ah Ya Helw” – Sabah Fakhri (featured in the trailer)
- “Pathétique Sonata” – Ludwig van Beethoven
- “Prelude” – Johann Sebastian Bach
- “ElKora Mdawara” – Samir Ghanem
- “Ave maria” – Rudolf Schock
- “Dawsha” – Samir El-Askandarany
- "Ya Ably ya Kattek" – The Jets
- "Adeny Olt" – Mohamed Nouh
- "The tracks of my tears" – Smokey Robinson & The Miracles

== Critical reception ==
Variety observed a relative lack of depth in the stories of women as compared to men, finding that it "feels less like a film about the bridging of two distinct worldviews than one about Ahmed reconfiguring his understanding of the only reality he's ever truly known through his bond with Elizabeth."Cineuropa concluded that The Stories was "a fun movie that would fare better in theatres than on a festival circuit dominated by gloomy arthouse pieces. In a milieu like this, it constitutes a refreshing change."In Review Online found the film "often compelling and enjoyable" but lamented that some of its stories felt unrealized or underdeveloped. ScreenAnarchy praised The Stories as a finely tuned crowd-pleaser that successfully refreshes familiar family-saga tropes while remaining emotionally involving.

Following the film commercial release in France, the film received overwhelmingly positive reviews, Première described it as "an extraordinary family," Ouest-France praised its "energy and devastating humor," Télérama called it "a romance woven into the heart of Egypt's history," and Le Figaro hailed it as "a vibrant family portrait." The film's warm reception reflected the French audience's longstanding appreciation for auteur and international cinema.

== See also ==
- List of submissions to the 99th Academy Awards for Best International Feature Film
- List of Egyptian submissions for the Academy Award for Best International Feature Film
