= Slugs (2004 film) =

- Directed by: Michael Glawogger
- Starring: Raimund Wallisch; Michael Ostrowski
- Release date: 5 March 2004
- Running time: 1h 26min
- Country: Austria
- Language: German

Slugs (German: Nacktschnecken) is a 2004 Austrian comedy film directed by Michael Glawogger.

== Cast ==
- Raimund Wallisch - Johann
- Michael Ostrowski - Max
- Pia Hierzegger - Mao
- Iva Lukic - Mara
- Sophia Laggner - Martha
- Georg Friedrich - Schorsch
- Mike Supancic - Reini
- Brigitte Kren - Anita
- Elisabeth Holzmeister - Julia
- Helmut Köpping - Gerhard
- Faris Rahoma - Zejlko
- August Schmölzer - Zuhälter
- Christoph Grissemann - Grissemann
