= Amir El-Masry =

Egyptian actor (born 1990)

- أمير المصرى
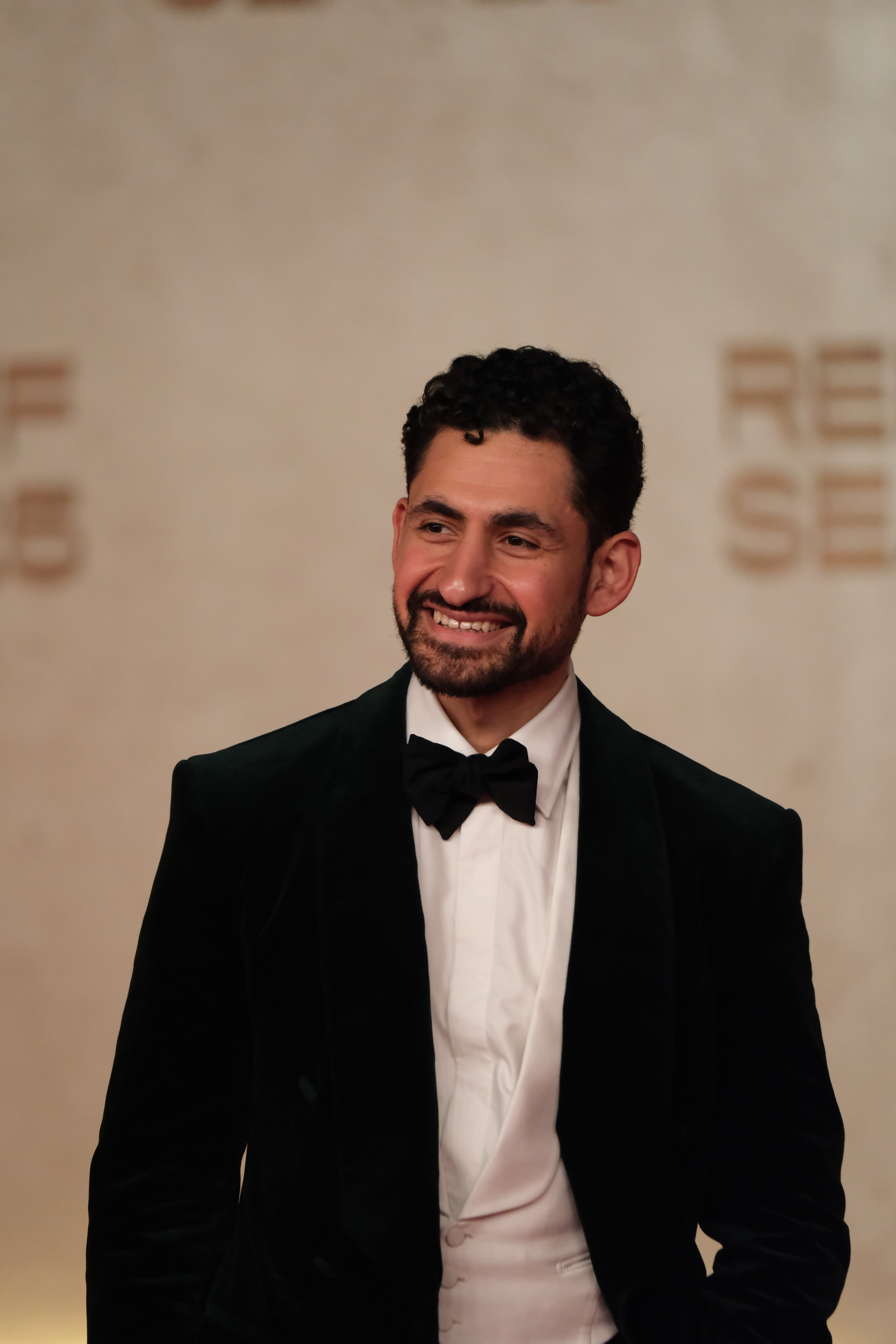
- El-Masry at the 2025 Red Sea Film Festival
- Born: 2 August 1990 (age 36); Cairo, Egypt
- Education: Royal Holloway, University of London; LAMDA
- Occupation: Actor
- Years active: 2008–present

Amir El-Masry (Egyptian Arabic: أمير المصرى) is an Egyptian actor. He won a Scottish BAFTA for his performance in the film Limbo (2020) and was nominated for a British Independent Film Award. He was named a 2020 BAFTA Breakthrough Brit and a 2021 Screen International Star of Tomorrow.

El-Masry debuted in Egyptian cinema, appearing in the Egyptian comedy Ramadan Mabrouk Abu El Alamein Hamouda (2008), for which he was awarded Best Movie Debut at the Egyptian Cinema Oscar Festival.

== Early life and education ==
Born on 2 August 1990 to an Egyptian family, El-Masry was brought up in Acton, West London. He attended Tower House School and the Harrodian School. He went on to graduate with a Bachelor of Science in criminology and sociology from Royal Holloway, University of London. After interning at a law firm, he trained at the London Academy of Music and Dramatic Art (LAMDA), graduating in 2013.

== Career ==
After a conversation with actor Omar Sharif while his father was on a business trip, El-Masry met a screenwriter at a screening of Hassan and Marcus and made his debut in Egyptian cinema, appearing in the Egyptian comedy films Ramadan Mabrouk Abu El Alamein Hamouda (2008), as Ramzy and El-Talatah Yishtaghaloonha (2010), as Nabil. For the former, El-Masry was awarded Best Movie Debut at the 2009 Egyptian Cinema Oscar Festival. He took time out of his first year at Royal Holloway to be in the latter.

After graduating from LAMDA, El-Masry first appeared on British television in a 2013 episode of the medical soap opera Casualty as Naveed. The following year, he made his Hollywood debut as Alireza in Jon Stewart's Rosewater. He had guest roles in the internationally co-produced Transporter: The Series and the FX series Tyrant, and appeared in the BBC Three pilot Rude Boys.

El-Masry received praise for his performance as Youssef in the 2016 BBC One miniseries The Night Manager. This was followed by 2017 roles in the Channel 4 serial The State and the independent film Lost in London. That same year, El-Masry made his professional stage debut in the Royal Court Theatre production of Goats and appeared in the Danish series Herrens Veje.

In 2018, El-Masry played Dante in the BBC One drama Age Before Beauty and had a recurring role as Ibrahim in Tom Clancy's Jack Ryan on Amazon Prime. He starred in the film Shoot. The following year, he played Kazem in the Egyptian series El-Brinseesa Beesa and Commander Trach in Star Wars: The Rise of Skywalker.

El-Masry starred as refugee Omar in Ben Sharrock's Limbo. For his performance, he won Best Actor in a Film at the 2021 British Academy Scotland Awards. He was also nominated for a British Independent Film Award (BIFA) and a Chlotrudis Award, and appeared on end-of-year lists from Peter Bradshaw of The Guardian and The Playlist. El-Masry had television roles in the first series of the BBC One and HBO series Industry as Usman Abboud in 2020 and the Netflix science fiction series The One as Ben Naser in 2021.

El-Masry was cast as a young Mohamed Al-Fayed in the fifth season of the Netflix Royal Family drama The Crown. He also has a recurring role in the BBC World War II drama SAS: Rogue Heroes and Jessica Hausner's Club Zero.

In April 2024, it was announced that he had been cast as Prince Naseem in the biopic Giant. After starting in Giant, he appeared as a guest star in the Egyptian biopic film El Sett, by Marwan Hamed, in which he appeared as a sound Engineer in a scene with Mona Zaki, who played the character of Egyptian legendary singer Umm Kulthum. In 2026, he starred in the Egyptian anthology film The Stories by Abu Bakr Shawky. In September 2026, the film was selected as the Egyptian entry in the 99th Academy Awards.

In 2026, El-Masry was selected as president of the First Feature Competition jury at the 2026 BFI London Film Festival.

== Personal life ==
El-Masry lives in Acton, London. He is Muslim. In September 2025, he signed an open pledge with Film Workers for Palestine pledging not to work with Israeli film institutions "that are implicated in genocide and apartheid against the Palestinian people."

== Filmography ==
=== Film ===
Year	Title	Role	Notes
2008	Ramadan Mabrouk Abu El Alamein Hamouda	Ramzy	
2010	El-Talatah Yishtaghaloonha	Nabil	
2014	Rosewater	Alireza	
2017	Lost in London	Omar	
2017	Farside	Sayeed	Short film
2018	Shoot	Anmar Almadi	
2019	Held for Ransom	John	
2019	Star Wars: The Rise of Skywalker	Commander Trach	
2020	Limbo	Omar	
2021	The Protocol	Hugo	Short film
2021	Ritsa	Husam Haddad	
2023	Club Zero	Mr. Dahl	
2023	A Haunting in Venice	Alessandro Longo	
2023	In Camera	Conrad	
2022	#GAWEZNI	Fares	
2025	100 Nights of Hero	Jerome	
2025	Giant	Naseem Hamed	
2025	El Sett	Sound Engineer	Guest appearance
2026	The Stories	Ahmad	

=== Television ===
Year	Title	Role	Notes
2013	Casualty	Naveed	Episode: "Special: Scars and Nightmares"
2014	BBC Comedy Feeds	Bolts	Episode: "Rude Boys"
2014	Transporter: The Series	Ayoub Al-Jifri	Episode: "Beacon of Hope"
2015	Tyrant	Musa	Episode: "Mark of Cain"
2016	The Night Manager	Youssef	Miniseries; 2 episodes
2017	The State	Sayed	Miniseries; 3 episodes
2017	Herrens veje	Tolken	2 episodes
2018	McMafia	Tarek	2 episodes
2018	Age Before Beauty	Dante	Main role
2018	Jack Ryan	Ibrahim	Recurring role; 7 episodes
2019	El-Brinseesa Beesa	Kazem	Main role
2020	Industry	Usman Abboud	Main role, season 1 (4 episodes)
2021	The One	Ben Naser	6 episodes
2022	SAS: Rogue Heroes	Dr. Gamal	3 episodes
2022	The Crown	Mohamed Al-Fayed	Episode: "Mou Mou"
2023	Vigil	Daniel Ramsay	series 2
2024	Wolf Hall: The Mirror and the Light	Thomas Wyatt	
2026	The Agency	Saeed Al Bakhatir	season 2
2026	MobLand	Luca Ruzgar	season 2; guest role (1 episode)

=== Video games ===
Year	Title	Role	Notes
2016	Deus Ex: Mankind Divided	Additional voices	
2017	Assassin's Creed: Origins	Voice	
2017	Lego Marvel Super Heroes 2		

== Stage ==
Year	Title	Role	Notes
2017	Goats	Adnan	Royal Court Theatre, London
2019	The Abyss		Edinburgh Fringe Festival

== Audio ==
Year	Title	Role	Notes
2014	The Insider	Joseph	BBC Radio 3
2014	The Brick	Elias	BBC Radio 4
2014	The Boy from Aleppo who Painted the War	Tariq	BBC Radio 4
2014	The Puppet Master	Jamil	BBC Radio 4
2014	In Praise of Radical Fish	Reader	BBC Radio 4
2015	Rasselas, Prince of Abyssinia	Ahmed	BBC Radio 4
2015	The Road to Bani Walid	Husam / Malik	BBC Radio 4
2015	Oil: The Weapon	Youssuf	BBC Radio 4

== Awards and nominations ==
Year	Award	Category	Work	Result	Ref.
2009	Egyptian Cinema Oscar Festival	Best Movie Debut	Ramadan Mabrouk Abu El Alamein Hamouda	Won	
2021	British Independent Film Awards	Best Actor	Limbo	Nominated	
2021	British Academy Scotland Awards	Best Actor in a Film	Limbo	Won	
2022	Chlotrudis Awards	Best Actor	Limbo	Nominated	
