= South of Pico =

- Directed by: Ernst Gossner
- Written by: Ernst Gossner; Richard Marcus (story)
- Produced by: Eric Presley; Richard Marcus; Ernst Gossner
- Starring: Kip Pardue; Henry Simmons; Gina Torres; Giovanni Lopes; Jimmy Bennett; Christina Hendricks; Paul Hipp; Ken Davitian
- Cinematography: Richard Marcus
- Edited by: Jessica Kehrhahn
- Music by: John Swihart
- Release date: October 25, 2007 (American Black Film Festival)
- Running time: 84 minutes
- Country: United States
- Language: English

South of Pico is a 2007 drama film written and directed by Ernst Gossner set in Los Angeles.

== Plot ==
In present-day Los Angeles, a chauffeur, a waitress, a doctor and a young boy each deal with life’s daily challenges. They find themselves at the scene of an accident the moment it happens. This becomes a defining moment in their lives.

One story is a chauffeur named Robert Spencer that assigned to drive a bride Angela (Christina Hendricks) to a wedding. He eyes her in back seat through the rear view mirror while she is pulling up her garter belt. She demands to stop for cigarettes at a local retail store. When he returns she holds him and tells him to kiss her and they have sex at the back of the limousine.

== Cast ==
- Kip Pardue as Robert Spencer
- Henry Simmons as Dr. Walter Chambers
- Gina Torres as Carla Silva
- Soren Fulton as Patrick Wise
- Christina Hendricks as Angela
- Jimmy Bennett as Mark Weston
- Giovanni Lopes as Jorge
- Paul Hipp as Comma
- Car'ynn Sims as Francine
- Gabrielle Christian as Astrid

== Release ==
The film premiered at the American Black Film Festival in October 2007.

== Awards ==
- American Black Film Festival - 2007, Grand Jury Award - Best Picture
- American Black Film Festival - 2007, Grand Jury Award - Best Actor for Henry Simmons
- American Black Film Festival - 2007, Red Star Award for Originality, Innovation and Vision for Ernst Gossner
- Pan African Film Festival - 2008, First Feature Competition - Best Director
- Drehbuchverband Austria - 2008, Thomas Pluch Screenplay Award
- International Innsbruck Film Festival - 2008, Audience Award
- International Beijing Film Festival - 2008, Best Picture

== Production ==
South of Pico was shot in various locations around Los Angeles. The story is inspired by a fatal road rage incident in Chicago 2003; a similar case happened in 2007 in Austin, Texas.
