= Theo Trebs =

German actor (born 1994)

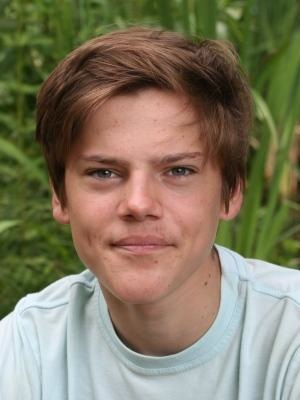
- Trebs in July 2010
- Born: 6 September 1994 (age 31); Berlin, Germany
- Occupation: Actor
- Years active: 2006–present

Theo Trebs (born 6 September 1994) is a German actor, known for his feature film roles as Ferdinand in the World War I period film The White Ribbon (2009), and as Felix in the soccer drama film Lessons of a Dream (2011).

== Biography ==
Trebs lives in a family with five children. His mother, Dorothea Trebs, is a talent agent, and his siblings Enno, Lilli, Nele, and Pepe are also young German actors. Trebs previously played supporting roles in Lilly the Witch – The Dragon and the Magic Book (2008); Krupp – A German Family (2008), as Alfried Krupp (aged 10–13 years); and as Ferdinand in Michael Haneke's award-winning historical drama The White Ribbon (2009). In 2010 he appeared in Rammbock and in the television crime series Inspektor Barbarotti – Mensch ohne Hund. In 2011 he appeared as Felix Hartung in the soccer-themed dramatic film, Lessons of a Dream, which earned him a Young Artist Award nomination as "Best Leading Young Actor in an International Feature Film".

In his spare time, he is active in sports, especially as sailor in a youth class (29er).

== Filmography ==
Film and television
Year	Title	Role	Notes
2006	Die kleine Benimmschule 2	Florian	Video
2008	Sara	Boy#3	Short
2009	Krupp: A Family Between War and Peace	Alfred Krupp age 10–13	ZDF TV mini-series
2009	Lilly the Witch: The Dragon and the Magic Book	Andreas	
2009	The White Ribbon	Ferdinand	
2010	Prinz und Bottel	Boy	ZDF TV mini-series
2010	Inspektor Barbarotti – Mensch ohne Hund	Kristoffer Grundt	TV film
2010	Rammbock	Harper	
2011	Lessons of a Dream	Felix Hartung	
2011	Stuttgart Homicide: Sorgenkinder	Noah Brock	TV series episode
2012	Tatort: Der Wald steht schwarz und schweiget	Baby	TV series episode
2012	Tatort: Fette Hunde	Constantin Brandt	TV series episode
2017	Summer of '44: The Lost Generation	Knuffke	TV film
2025	Fall for Me	Tom	Netflix film
2026	Fatherland		

== Awards ==
Year	Award	Category	Work(s)	Result	Ref.
2011	New Faces Award	Best newcomer	Rammbock, Lessons of a Dream	Won	
2012	Young Artist Award	Best Young Actor in an International Feature Film	Lessons of a Dream	Nominated	
