= Murder Mindfully =

2024 German dark humor television series

- Release poster
- Genre: Black comedy; Crime thriller
- Created by: Konstantin von Carlowitz
- Written by: Karsten Dusse; Doron Wisotzky; Anneke Janssen; Michael Kenda
- Directed by: Boris Kunz; Max Zähle; Martina Plura
- Starring: Tom Schilling; Emily Cox; Peter Jordan; Murathan Muslu; Sascha Alexander Geršak; Marc Hosemann; Britta Hammelstein; Amer El-Erwadi
- Composers: Konstantin Gropper; Ziggy Has Ardeur
- Country of origin: Germany
- Original language: German
- No. of seasons: 2
- No. of episodes: 16

Production
- Executive producer: Oliver Berben
- Producers: Jan Ehlert; Nina Viktoria Philipp
- Production location: Germany
- Cinematography: Monika Plura
- Running time: 30-35 minutes
- Production company: Constantin Film

Original release
- Network: Netflix
- Release: October 31, 2024–present

Murder Mindfully (German: Achtsam Morden) is a German black comedy crime thriller television series based on the novel series of the same name by Karsten Dusse and produced for Netflix. It premiered on Netflix globally on October 31, 2024 (Halloween), with the first season adapting the first novel in the series, and received generally favorable reviews. A second season was released on May 28, 2026, based on the second novel. The series was renewed for a third season in January 2026, ahead of the second season's release.

== Premise ==
Björn Diemel is a hardworking law firm employee, but has no prospect of becoming a partner, because he has to serve the firm's scumbag client: the mafia boss, Dragan Sergowicz. Björn's time-consuming job leaves little time for his wife Katharina and his little daughter Emily. To save their marriage and for the sake of their child, Katharina urges him to see the therapist Joschka Breitner.

Through Breitner's mindfulness coaching, Björn learns to achieve a better work-life balance, though with unforeseen outcomes. Unfortunately, Dragan gets himself into serious trouble and is dragging Björn down with him. Now, Björn is using his newly minted skill with mindfulness to survive the web of criminality he has been thrust into.

== Cast and characters ==
- Tom Schilling as Björn Diemel, a defense attorney with an occupational burnout
- Emily Cox as Katharina Diemel, Björn’s wife
- Peter Jordan as Joschka Breitner, the mindfulness coach
- Sascha Alexander Geršak as Dragan Sergowicz, a mob boss and Björn’s client
- Pamuk Pilavci as Emily Diemel, Björn and Katharina’s daughter
- Amer El-Erwadi as Murat, a mobster and one of Björn’s clients
- Murathan Muslu as Sascha, a mobster and kindergarten teacher
- Marc Hosemann as Toni, a mobster
- Britta Hammelstein as Nicole Eckmann / Egmann, a police officer and single mother
- Bernd Hölscher as Walter
- Johannes Allmayer as Klaus Möller
- Friederike Kempter as Laura
- Luca Maric as Boris
- Michael Ihnow as a prison judge

== Production ==
Netflix announced the eight-episode first season of the television series, starring Tom Schilling, in February 2022. Filming began in November 2023 under the direction of Martina Plura and Max Zähle. The screenplay was written by Doron Wisotzky, Anneke Janssen, and Michael Kenda. The series is produced by Jan Ehlert and Nina Viktoria Philipp, with Oliver Berben and Ehlert serving as executive producers.

On 18 December 2024, Netflix announced the production of an eight-episode second season, which was filmed in 2025 and released globally on 28 May 2026. In January 2026, Netflix commissioned a third season.

== Episodes ==
=== Series overview ===
Season	Episodes	Originally released	Network
1	8	October 31, 2024	Netflix
2	8	May 28, 2026	Netflix

=== Season 1 (2024) ===
No. overall	No. in season	German Title	English Title	Original air date
1	1	"Atmen"	"Breathing"	October 31, 2024
2	2	"Glück"	"Happiness"	October 31, 2024
3	3	"Angst"	"Fear"	October 31, 2024
4	4	"Unverschämtheiten"	"Shamelessness"	October 31, 2024
5	5	"Panik"	"Panic"	October 31, 2024
6	6	"Brainstorming"	"Brainstorming"	October 31, 2024
7	7	"Wut"	"Anger"	October 31, 2024
8	8	"Tod"	"Death"	October 31, 2024

=== Season 2 (2026) ===
No. overall	No. in season	German Title	English Title	Original air date
9	1	"Urlaub"	"Vacation"	May 28, 2026
10	2	"Realität"	"Reality"	May 28, 2026
11	3	"Eltern"	"Parents"	May 28, 2026
12	4	"Kreativität"	"Creativity"	May 28, 2026
13	5	"Wissen"	"Knowledge"	May 28, 2026
14	6	"Fehler"	"Mistake"	May 28, 2026
15	7	"Zweifel"	"Doubt"	May 28, 2026
16	8	"Moral"	"Morality"	May 28, 2026

== Release ==
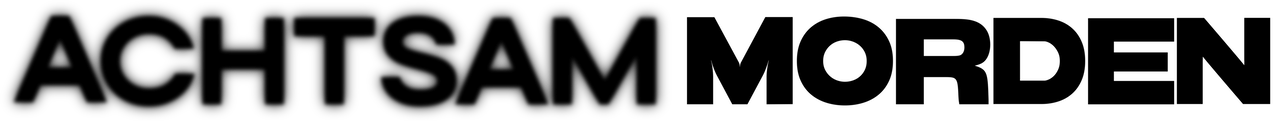
German title logo for the series

The first season premiered globally on Netflix on October 31, 2024 (Halloween), with the series made available in a number of languages aside from the original German, offering English, Spanish, French, Polish, Danish, Portuguese, and Cantonese versions. Netflix released the second season on May 28, 2026, and confirmed that the series was renewed for a third season.

== Streaming success ==
Season 1 hit the number 1 spot in the Netflix Global Top 10 Non-English Shows category in the week after release. It stayed for three weeks in the Global Top 10.

Season 2 reached the number 6 spot in the same Netflix Global Top 10 Non-English Shows category in the week following its release. It remained in the Global Top 10 for a total of two weeks.

== Awards ==
Murder Mindfully won the German Television Award 2025 for Best Comedy Series. Tom Schilling was nominated as Best Actor.

== Reception ==
Joel Keller wrote for Decider: "Murder Mindfully takes a high-concept premise and makes it relatable, thanks to sharp writing and Tom Schilling’s performance."

David Hollingsworth (whattowatch) describes the series as "violently funny".

Charles Hartford wrote for ButWhyTho: "Murder Mindfully delivers a thoroughly enjoyable ride. With great characters and a surprising plot, the series keeps the viewer invested in its world, even if it lacks the highs of truly great television."

Craig Mathieson of The Age described the series as "a black comedy that blurs familiar genre lines."

Experimental filmmaker Josef Markus wrote for Goethe-Institut USA: "Murder Mindfully is a crash course in dark, deadpan German humor ... And the cast guarantees the viewer will keep watching. Tom Schilling has built a fine career as the thinking man’s thinking man of German film .. Murder Mindfully goes down smoothly. The half-hour episodes never overstay their welcome, and there are no extraneous subplots to pad the season, a rarity for a streaming series. Monika Plura’s sleek cinematography, particularly in the nighttime views of Berlin, could make a viewer want to pet their television. For plenty of audiences that may be enough ... Yet for all that the series feels meticulously cross-stitched from half a dozen earlier binge-watching hits. The streamers may not be interested in creative risks anymore. Instead, they’re all about giving viewers more of what they already liked — and they have the data to prove it."

== Original novel series ==
The Netflix television series Murder Mindfully (German: Achtsam Morden) is based on a crime novel series of the same title by the German author and lawyer Karsten Dusse, the first novel of which was published in June 2019 by Heyne Verlag, Munich, and became a bestseller. Four more serialized novels were published by 2024 as sequels to the original, comprising five total released novels.

When Netflix announced the television adaptation starring Tom Schilling as Björn Diemel in February 2022, three novels had previously been published. The fourth novel was subsequently released in September 2022, with the fifth following in January 2024, the same year as the first season of the television series, which premiered in October.

As of now, the television series has a formula of adapting one novel per season. In 2024, Netflix released the first season, consisting of 8 episodes, which adapted the first novel in the series. In 2026, the second season followed, also with 8 episodes, which covers the second novel. A third season has been announced as in development, set to adapt the third novel.

=== Published novels ===
==== 1. Achtsam morden. Ein entschleunigter Kriminalroman. ====
English: Murder Mindfully: A Slowed-Down Crime Novel (Note: Official English translations of the novels, including English versions of the titles, only exist for the first two installments, which are titled Murder Mindfully (sans subtitle in the UK, or subtitled A Mindful Murder Novel in the US) and My Inner Child Wants to Murder Mindfully (in the UK, or My Inner Child Wants to Kill in the US), respectively. The English titles listed, except for the second, are unofficial translations.)

Heyne Verlag, Munich, June 10, 2019, ISBN 978-3-453-43968-9.

==== 2. Das Kind in mir will achtsam morden. ====
English: My Inner Child Wants to Murder Mindfully

Heyne Verlag, Munich, May 10, 2020, ISBN 978-3-453-42444-9.

==== 3. Achtsam morden am Rande der Welt. ====
English: Murder Mindfully at the Edge of the World

Heyne Verlag, Munich, April 25, 2021, ISBN 978-3-453-27356-6.

==== 4. Achtsam morden im Hier und Jetzt. ====
English: Murder Mindfully in the Here and Now

Heyne Verlag, Munich, September 13, 2022, ISBN 978-3-453-27386-3.

==== 5. Achtsam morden durch bewusste Ernährung. ====
English: Murder Mindfully Through Conscious Eating

Heyne Verlag, Munich, January 10, 2024, ISBN 978-3-453-27387-0.
