= Pia Hierzegger =

Austrian actress

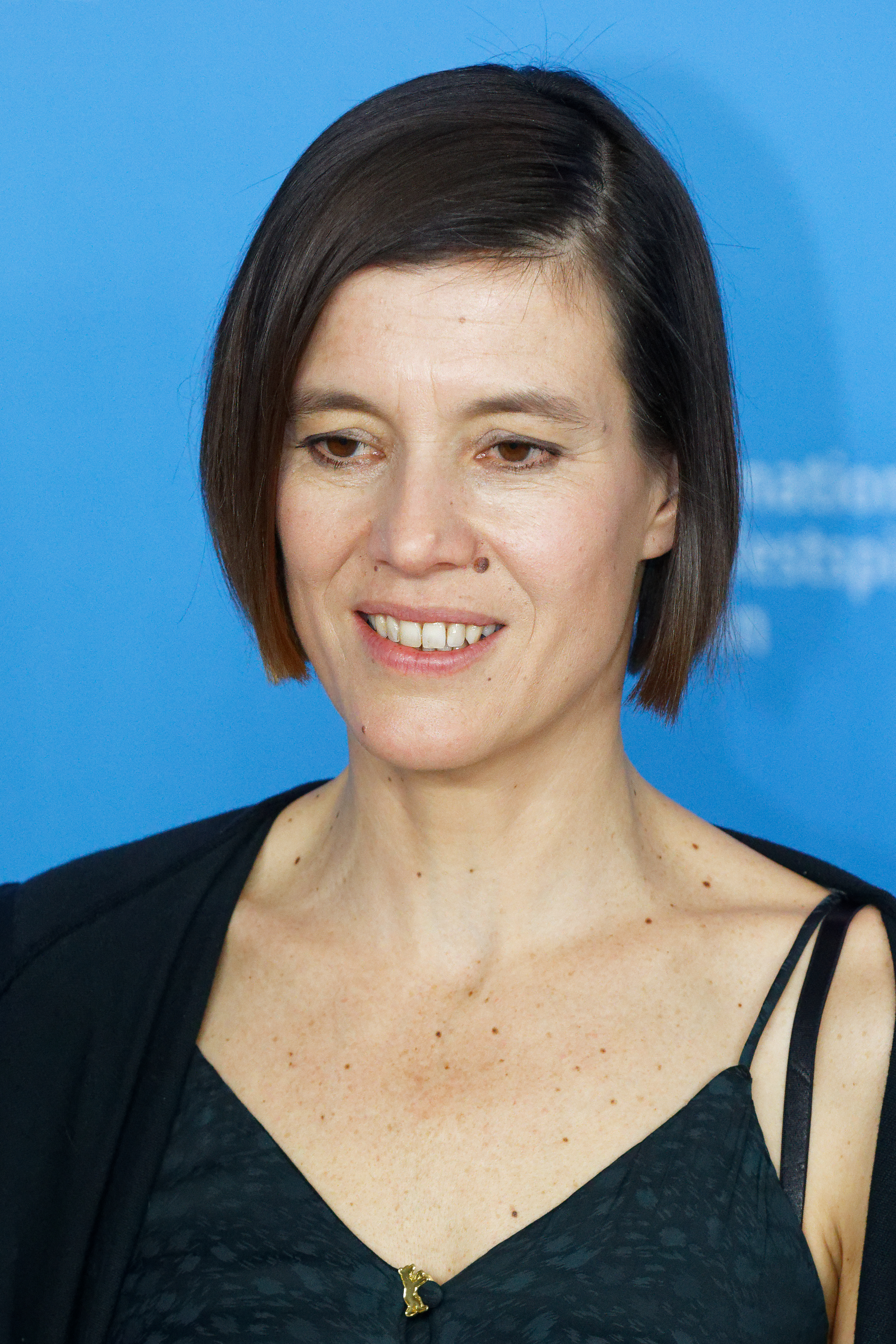
- Hierzegger at the 2017 Berlin International Film Festival
- Born: 2 February 1972 (age 54); Graz, Austria
- Occupation: Actress
- Years active: 2004-present

Pia Hierzegger (born 2 February 1972) is an Austrian actress. She has appeared in more than fifteen films since 2004.

== Selected filmography ==
Year	Title	Role	Notes
2004	Slugs		
2006	Slumming		
2009	The Bone Man		
2009	Contact High		
2011	The Fatherless		
2017	Wild Mouse		
2019	The Ground Beneath My Feet		
2024	Ivo	Solveigh	World Premiere at the 74th Berlin International Film Festival
