= Blood Glacier =

- Blutgletscher
- Directed by: Marvin Kren
- Written by: Benjamin Hessler
- Starring: Gerhard Liebmann, Edita Malovcic, Brigitte Kren
- Cinematography: Moritz Schultheiß
- Edited by: Daniel Prochaska
- Music by: Stefan Will, Marco Dreckkötter
- Production companies: Allegro Film, Filmfonds Wien, Filmstandort Austria
- Release date: September 6, 2013 (TIFF)
- Running time: 98 minutes
- Country: Austria
- Language: German

Blood Glacier (also known as Blutgletscher, Glazius, and The Station) is a 2013 Austrian horror film directed by Marvin Kren. The movie had its world premiere at the Toronto International Film Festival on September 6, 2013, and had a limited theatrical release in the United States on May 2, 2014. It stars Gerhard Liebmann as a researcher faced with a strange liquid that poses a threat to anything living.

== Synopsis ==
Janek (Gerhard Liebmann) is a technician who works at a research station in the Austrian Alps. Small teams of scientists come to the station to study global warming. It seems that Janek does not get along well with the current team, as he prefers to keep to himself. One day Janek and the scientists discover a glacier covered in a strange red liquid that has odd effects on the surrounding wildlife. The scientists become excited as they realize that it takes root in the stomach and combines the DNA of the host animal with whatever it has ingested, often resulting in the creation of a hybrid creature that will, inevitably, burst from the animal's interiors and wreak havoc on anyone that crosses their paths. But Janek is more wary of the liquid and the potential dangers it poses. His caution is soon proven to be warranted, as the group begins to fall prey to the hybrids created by the liquid. A supervisory visit by the climate minister is scheduled, and Janek is horrified when he finds that a former girlfriend of his is among the newcomers.

== Cast ==
- Gerhard Liebmann as Janek
- Edita Malovcic as Tanja
- Brigitte Kren as Ministerin Bodicek
- Santos as Tinni
- Hille Beseler as Birte
- Peter Knaack as Falk
- Felix Römer as Harald
- Wolfgang Pampel as Bert Krakauer
- Murathan Muslu as Luca
- Michael Fuith as Urs
- Adina Vetter as Irene
- Coco Huemer as Geli

== Reception ==
On Rotten Tomatoes the film has a rating of 45% on based on 22 reviews. On Metacritic it has a score of 45% based on 9 reviews, indicating "mixed or average reviews".

Many reviewers made negative comparisons to John Carpenter's The Thing, with IndieWire stating that "this low budget chiller is unable to capture the same kind of awe and terror that made "The Thing" so powerful, although its attempt to be more character-based and emphasis on practical effects is somewhat admirable." Praise for the movie tended to center upon the movie's status as an eco-horror film, as multiple reviewers praised it for not being a "preachy diatribe" and for its monsters. The A.V. Club noted that while the film was very similar to other movies in the same genre, this worked in Blood Glacier's favor as it was "a movie viewers have seen dozens of times before, and will see again, with slight variations, because it embodies a fundamental quality of B-horror entertainment."

=== Awards ===
At the 2014 Austrian Film Awards, Gerhard Liebmann won Best Actor, Susanne Weichesmiller and Roman Braunhofer won Best Makeup, and Dietmar Zuson, Nils Kirchhoff, Philipp Kemptner and Bernhard Maisch won Best Sound. Daniel Prochaska was nominated for Best Editing. In 2014, Blutgletscher was in competition for the Max Ophüls Award at the Max Ophüls Festival.
