= Kvorning Design & Communication =

Kvorning Design & Communication (Danish: Kvorning design & kommunikation) are Danish exhibition designers operating worldwide as total supplier or partner since 1992. The Kvorning team of experienced designers, architects, project managers, historians and communicators combine storytelling, design and architecture to create unique and magic spaces and moments. Crafting exhibitions and design of all kinds, complexities and scales in museums, galleries, visitor centres, brand stores, cultural heritage sites, World Expos, urban spaces, and private homes.

== History ==
Kvorning Design & Communication was founded in Copenhagen in 1992 by Chief Exhibition Designer and Architect MAA MDD Arne Kvorning. In 2004 the studio designed the first exhibition of the new Daniel Libeskind-designed Danish Jewish Museum. In April 2010 the Kvorning team won a competition held by English Heritage for the development of a permanent exhibition in The Secret Wartime Tunnels at Dover Castle. Kvorning also collaborated with Erik Møller Architects on the design of a new visitor centre at Zubarah Fort in Qatar. Operating from Copenhagen, Aarhus, Oslo, London, Beijing, St Petersburg and Yekatarinburg, Kvorning Design & Communication have designed, produced and installed exhibitions and design projects in more than 50 countries (2019.

Exhibition co-operation with Zaha Hadid Architects, Daniel Libeskind, Dominique Perrault, Jean Nouvel, NOrmann Foster, Snöhetta, C&CG Partners LLC, 3XN, schmidt hammer lassen, Erik Møller Arkitekter, BIG and White Arkitekter among others.
