= Ernst Gossner =

Austrian-American film director

- Born: Brixlegg, Austria
- Occupations: Film director, screenwriter, producer
- Years active: 1991 - present

Ernst Gossner is an Austrian film director, screenwriter and producer best known for writing and directing the 2007 film South of Pico as well as 2014 film The Silent Mountain

== Background ==
Gossner grew up in Tirol and had his first stage appearance at the age of 15. After graduating from Business School in 1992, Gossner worked at various jobs before he turned to acting full-time.

Within the next seven years Ernst appeared in many plays in Austria, Germany and Italy. He also wrote and directed several stage plays and made his short film debut FLUCHT. The film became an internet phenomenon and in 1999 Ernst was accepted to the Directing Program at the AFI Conservatory in Los Angeles. His AFI thesis film BAR TIME was one of only five AFI alumni films ever released on DVD by the American Film Institute.

== Feature films ==
After graduating from AFI Conservatory Ernst Gossner founded his Los Angeles-based company Vent Productions. His first feature South of Pico (SOP), a character driven drama co-developed with his long-time collaborator Richard Marcus was shot in Los Angeles and premiered at the 2007 American Black Film Festival where it won all three awards it was nominated for. South of Pico went on to win seven international Awards in the U.S., Europe and China and was released in the US and Europe.

Ernst Gossner followed up with the documentary Global Warning which he co-created with Robert Narholz. This documentary lead to Ernst's second feature film The Silent Mountain with William Moseley, Eugenia Costantini and Claudia Cardinale. The Silent Mountain was released in March 2014 and became a box-office-hit in Ernst's native Austria. The film went on to become an international bestseller and sold to more than 60 countries worldwide.

Ernst also directed the feature-film segments of 2017 TV-co-production Maria Theresia - Majestät und Mutter (ORF, ARTE, ZDF, Cesky Televise). Watched in total by more than 1,1 Million viewers in Austria.

Currently, Ernst Gossner has secured the rights to Fred Mayer's story, the true story of the real Inglorious Bastard. Ernst will turn Fred's story into a TV mini-series. He also finished a documentary on the liberation of the Mauthausen concentration camp 1945 with the title Whom To Tell which premiered at the (Heimatfilmfestival) and garnered the audience award.

== Awards ==
- USA Film Festival
  - 2002 - Special Jury Award, Bar Time
- American Black Film Festival
  - 2007 - Best Feature, South Of Pico
- American Black Film Festival
  - 2007 - Red Star Award for Originality, Innovation and Vision, South Of Pico
- Pan-African Film Festival
  - 2008 - Best First Feature, South Of Pico
- Drehbuchverband Austria (Writer's Guild)
  - 2008 - Thomas Pluch Screenplay Award, South Of Pico
- Innsbruck Film Festival
  - 2008 - Audience Award, South Of Pico
- Beijing Film Festival
  - 2008 - Best Feature, South Of Pico
- Heimatfilmfestival Freistadt
  - 2020 - Audience Award, Whom To Tell

== Filmography ==
- Flucht (1997)
- Bar Time (2002)
- The Point (2002)
- Otto+Anna (2005)
- South of Pico (2007)
- Global Warning (2011)
- The Silent Mountain (2014)
- Maria Theresia - Majestät und Mutter (2017)
- Whom To Tell (2020)

== Theater ==
- "Die Praesidentinnen" Tiroler Landestheater (1998)
- "Parzival," Bergfestspiele Seefeld, Austria (2002)
- "Elektrika," Winner European Union Grant (2005)
