= Stefanie Sycholt =

South African film director and screenwriter

- Born: 1963 (age 62–63); Pretoria, South Africa
- Education: University of Natal; University of Cape Town; University of Television and Film Munich
- Occupations: Film director, film producer, screenwriter

Stefanie Sycholt (born 1963) is a South African film director, film producer, and screenwriter.

== Biography ==
Sycholt was born in Pretoria in 1963. She studied English under J. M. Coetzee as well as political science and film theory at the University of Natal and University of Cape Town. Sycholt was active in the anti-apartheid student movement and served as a media officer for the National Union of South African Students. She managed the production team AVA which filmed Nelson Mandela's Welcome Home Rally in Durban in 1990. Sycholt subsequently travelled to Germany to study at the University of Television and Film Munich. She has worked in the Creative Writing Department of the University of Film and Television Munich as well as a writer and director.

In 2001, Sycholt made her feature film debut with Malunde, which told the story of a boy called Wonderboy who becomes friends with a former soldier in the white regime. It received six Avanti awards including best director, and a portion of the profits went to Mandela's charity for street children. She directed the made-for-TV comedy film Gwendolyn in 2007. In 2010, she wrote, directed, and co-produced Themba. Based on the eponymous novel by Lutz van Dijk, it is a family drama that tells the story of a young boy passionate about football and his mother who becomes infected with AIDS. Themba received the UNICEF Child Rights Award at the 2010 Zanzibar International Film Festival. Sycholt has directed several episodes of the Inga Lindström series.

Sycholt is based in Germany.

== Filmography ==
- 1998: MBUBE - Die Nacht der Löwen (director)
- 2001: Malunde (writer/director)
- 2007: Gwendolyn (director)
- 2007: Tango zu dritt (writer)
- 2009: Ella's Mystery (writer)
- 2010: Themba (writer/director/co-producer)
- 2010: Ein Sommer in Kapstadt (writer)
- 2010: Ein Sommer in Marrakesch (writer)
- 2011: Ein Sommer in den Bergen (writer)
- 2012: Die Löwin (writer/director)
- 2013: Weit hinter dem Horizont (writer/director)
- 2013: Mein ganzes halbes Leben (TV series, writer)
- 2013: Zwischen Himmel und hier (writer)
- 2016-2020: Inga Lindström (TV series, writer/director)
- 2018: Cecelia Ahern: Dich zu lieben (director)
- 2018 Inga Lindström - Die andere Tochter – Writer and director
- 2019 Inga Lindström - Familienfest in Sommerby – Writer and Director
- 2019 Inga Lindström - Klang der Sehnsucht – Writer and Director
- 2020 Inga Lindström - Das gestohlene Herz – Writer and Director
- 2021 Inga Lindström - Schmetterlinge im Bauch – Writer and Director
- 2021 Ein Sommer am Gardasee – Co-Writer and Director
- 2023 Inga Lindström - Spinnefeind - Writer
- 2023 Rosamunde Pilcher - Verliebt in einen Butler - Writer
- 2024 Un/Dressed – Amanzon, Writer
- 2025 Ein Sommer in Italien – Writer and Director
- 2025 Fall for Me – Netflix, Writer
