= Emily Cox =

British-Irish actress (born 1985)

- Born: 23 February 1985 (age 41); Vienna, Austria
- Occupation: Actor
- Years active: 2009–present

Emily Cox (born 23 February 1985) is an Austrian actress of Irish-British heritage, currently based in Berlin and Vienna. She played the lead female role of Brida, in the British television series The Last Kingdom (2015–2022).

== Biography ==
Cox was born to a British father and an Irish mother in Vienna, Austria. Her parents later divorced. Both of them are pianists, who originally came to Vienna on a grant for musicians. Cox grew up in Vienna and graduated from high school (Matura) in 2003. She developed an interest in acting after performing in a play as part of her English classes during her final year in high school. After her graduation she went on to study acting at the Max Reinhardt Seminar. In 2008 she was under contract as a stage actor at the Theater in der Josefstadt in Vienna. In 2011 Cox moved to Berlin and since then she has appeared in various movies and series on German and Austrian TV, among them several Tatort movies. From 2015 to 2022 she played the role of the Viking and Anglo-Saxon woman Brida in the TV series The Last Kingdom, which made her known to international audiences.

Cox also appeared in a few movies for the big screen including The Fatherless (2011), The Silent Mountain and Head Full of Honey (2018).

== Filmography ==
Film
Year	Title	Role	Notes
2009	Dutschke	Gretchen Dutschke	TV film
2010	Rammbock	Anita	
2011	The Fatherless	Mizzi	
2014	Futuro Beach	Nanna	
2014	The Silent Mountain	Lisl Gruber	
2018	Head Full of Honey	Nursing Home Manager	
2022	Alma & Oskar	Alma Mahler	
2023	The Last Kingdom: Seven Kings Must Die	Brida	

Television
Year	Title	Role	Notes
2015	Homeland	Claudia	1 episode
2016	Anatomy of Evil	Anita	1 episode "Liebe"
2015–2022	The Last Kingdom	Brida	Main
2017–2020	Jerks	Emily	
2024	Constellation	School Teacher	4 episode
2024	Murder Mindfully	Katharina Diemel	Main – 8 episode
2026	Der Thüringenkrimi	Dr. Mala Murphy	Main – open
