= Jack (2015 film) =

2015 film

- Film poster
- Directed by: Elisabeth Scharang
- Written by: Elisabeth Scharang
- Starring: Johannes Krisch
- Release date: 8 August 2015 (Locarno)
- Running time: 97 minutes
- Country: Austria
- Language: German

Jack is a 2015 Austrian thriller film about serial killer Jack Unterweger, directed by Elisabeth Scharang. It was screened in the Contemporary World Cinema section of the 2015 Toronto International Film Festival.

== Plot ==
Jack Unterweger, who grew up in a red-light district and who was previously known to the police for petty theft, is arrested for the murder of a woman, found guilty and sentenced to life in prison. While incarcerated, he begins to write, which attracts a following of several intellectuals. After about 15 years, he is granted parole, in great part due to the advocacy of his famous supporters. He soon becomes a heartthrob present at events, and a guest in television programs. He writes his first successful novel. He appears to be the model of rehabilitation after prison.

But after several unsolved murders of prostitutes, he attracts the attention of police investigators again. In 1994, Unterweger is charged with the crimes, again, and is sentenced to live without the possibility of parole. He commits suicide on the night of his conviction.

== Cast ==
- Johannes Krisch as Jack Unterweger
- Corinna Harfouch as Susanne Sönnmann
- Birgit Minichmayr as Marlies Haum
- Sarah Viktoria Frick as Charlotte
- Paulus Manker as psychologist Ziehofer
- Valerie Pachner as Marlene
