= Arrowad Group =

- Type: Private
- Industry: Education and Service
- Founded: 1990; 36 years ago
- Headquarters: Saudi Arabia
- Key people: Mr. Abdullah bin Ibrahim Al-Khalaf, Founder and President
- Number of employees: Over 800 full-time staff members
- Website: http://www.arrowad.sa/

Arrowad is a group of institutions with core activities in developing human resources and improving institutional performance.

== Ownership ==
Arrowad Group was founded in 1990 as a system of autonomous institutions actively functioning in the areas of education, consultation, training, continuous improvement, information technology and media. These companies are operating in Saudi Arabia, Qatar, UAE, Sudan, Oman, UK and others.

== Education ==
Although Arrowad Group has various roles to fulfill, education is the main function. The group has been establishing and running K-12 schools systems in KSA, Qatar, UK and others. These systems include IGCSE and SAT and the national curricula. Arrowad Group owns Arrowad International Schools in Riyadh, Arrowad International Schools in Doha, Arrowad Schools in Abha, Arrowad Schools in Buraydah, Arrowad Schools in Badaae, Arrowad Schools in Khamis Mushayt and others. The group has no contributions in higher education yet, however they offer teacher training qualification. The most notable is INTEREDU for qualifying teachers and fresh graduates to work for international schools.

== Service ==
Arrowad Group has a number of companies working on consultation, training, continuous improvement, information technology and media in the Middle East and North Africa. Continual improvement using KAIZEN methodology has been the focus of Arrowad Group for the past several years. They believe that KAIZEN and similar approaches will help transforming economies such as the Saudi economy via KSA's national transformation program achieve more effective spending as a central objective in the government Vision2030.
