= The Ground Beneath My Feet =

2019 film by Marie Kreutzer

- Theatrical release poster
- German: Der Boden unter den Füßen
- Directed by: Marie Kreutzer
- Written by: Marie Kreutzer
- Produced by: Alexander Glehr; Franz Novotny
- Starring: Valerie Pachner; Pia Hierzegger; Mavie Hörbiger; Michelle Barthel; Marc Benjamin; Axel Sichrovsky; Dominic Marcus Singer; Meo Wulf
- Cinematography: Leena Koppe
- Edited by: Ulrike Kofler
- Music by: Kyrre Kvam
- Production companies: Novotny & Novotny Filmproduktion
- Distributed by: Filmladen
- Release dates: 7 February 2019 (Berlin); 22 March 2019 (Austria)
- Running time: 108 minutes
- Country: Austria
- Language: German
- Box office: $29,251

The Ground Beneath My Feet (German: Der Boden unter den Füßen) is a 2019 Austrian drama film written and directed by Marie Kreutzer. It was selected to compete for the Golden Bear at the 69th Berlin International Film Festival.

The Ground Beneath My Feet had its world premiere at the Berlin International Film Festival on 9 February 2019. It premiered in Austria at the Diagonale film festival on 19 March 2019. The film was released theatrically in Austria on 22 March 2019 by Filmladen. It was released in Germany on 16 May 2019. The Ground Beneath My Feet screened at the Inside Out film festival in Toronto on 26 May 2019; and the Frameline Film Festival in San Francisco on 21 June 2019.

== Plot ==
Lola is due to travel to Germany for work when she finds her sister Conny has tried to commit suicide. Lola is in a relationship with her boss Elise. Lola tries to continue working for an important client but one of her colleagues is trying to undermine her. She hides that she has returned to Austria with her sister in crisis. She begins to doubt her own sanity, thinking she is hallucinating. Eventually, Conny is discharged and goes to live at Lola's flat. Lola is stunned that her colleague has been promoted and given another project in Australia. Lola returns home to find that Conny has committed suicide. Lola has a breakdown.

== Cast ==
- Valerie Pachner as Lola Wegenstein
- Pia Hierzegger as Conny Wegenstein
- Mavie Hörbiger as Elise
- Michelle Barthel as Birgit
- Marc Benjamin as Sebastian Selikowski
- Axel Sichrovsky as Herr Bacher
- Dominic Marcus Singer as Jürgen
- Meo Wulf as Clemens
