= Abdulmohsen Alnemr =

Saudi Arabian actor (born 1963)

Abdulmohsen Alnemr عبد المحسن النمر
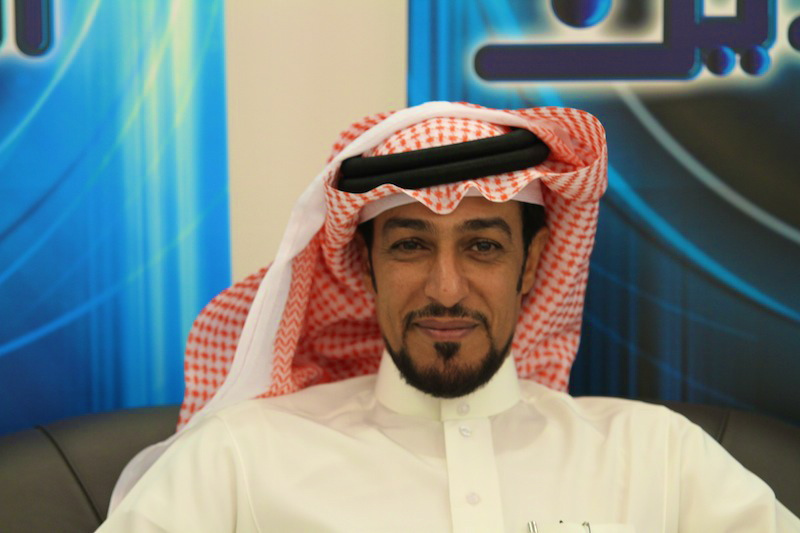
- Born: 17 November 1963 (age 62); Al-Ahsa Governorate, Saudi Arabia
- Occupation: Actor

Abdulmohsen Alnemr (Arabic: عبد المحسن النمر; 17 November 1963) is a Saudi Arabian actor. He has starred in several films and TV series, including the film Hajjan, and the series Khuyoot Al-Ma’azib. He has received numerous awards, including the "Best Actor" award at the Gulf Radio and Television Festival in 2024.
