= The Fatherless =

2011 film

- Directed by: Marie Kreutzer
- Written by: Marie Kreutzer
- Starring: Andreas Kiendl
- Cinematography: Leena Koppe
- Release dates: 13 February 2011 (Berlin); 8 April 2011 (Austria)
- Running time: 104 minutes
- Country: Austria
- Language: German

The Fatherless (German: Die Vaterlosen) is a 2011 Austrian drama film written and directed by Marie Kreutzer. It is Kreutzer's debut film and it won a Special Mention at the 2011 Berlin International Film Festival.

== Cast ==
- Andreas Kiendl as Vito
- Andrea Wenzl as Kyra
- Emily Cox as Mizzi
- Philipp Hochmair as Niki
- Marion Mitterhammer as Anna
- Sami Loris as Miguel
- Pia Hierzegger as Sophie
- Johannes Krisch as Hans
- Axel Sichrovsky as Ossi
