= Yomeddine =

2018 film directed by Abu Bakr Shawky

- International release poster
- Arabic: يوم الدين
- Directed by: Abu Bakr Shawky
- Written by: Abu Bakr Shawky
- Produced by: Dina Emam
- Starring: Rady Gamal; Ahmed Abdelhafiz
- Cinematography: Federico Cesca
- Edited by: Erin Greenwell
- Music by: Omar Fadel
- Production companies: Aquarius Lion Productions; Desert Highway Pictures; Film-Clinic
- Release date: 9 May 2018 (Cannes)
- Running time: 93 minutes
- Country: Egypt
- Language: Arabic
- Box office: $81,030

Yomeddine (Arabic: يوم الدين) (English: Judgement Day) is a 2018 Egyptian drama film written and directed by Abu Bakr Shawky, in his directorial debut. Starring non-professional actors, it follows Beshay (Rady Gamal), an outcast shunned and condemned by the outside world due his leprosy. While searching for his father he meets the Nubian homeless boy Obama (Ahmed Abdelhafiz), together they travel through Egypt. Yomeddine means "Day of Judgement" in Arabic.

The film had its world premiere in the main competition of the 2018 Cannes Film Festival on 9 May 2018, where it was nominated for the Palme d'Or and won the François Chalais Prize. It was selected as the Egyptian entry for the Best Foreign Language Film at the 91st Academy Awards, but it was not nominated.

== Plot ==
Beshay, a Coptic man who had leprosy, was taken by his father to a leper colony north of Cairo as a child. There he married the mentally ill Ireny. When Ireny dies, he sees her mother for the first time and realizes that he too has family. Beshay is cured of leprosy, but not of the scars: he has scars on his face, deformed hands and seems never to have grown up fully. He loads all his belongings onto a donkey cart with which he skims the garbage dump for a living and sets off for his native village near Qena. Shortly after his departure, Obama, a Nubian orphan boy, jumps on the cart. Together they travel south through Egypt, in search of what is left of his family. They are confronted with setbacks and good fortune, people who steal from them and people who help them.

== Cast ==
- Rady Gamal as Beshay
- Ahmed Abdelhafiz as Obama

== Reception ==
The film has 77% rating and an average rating 6.80/10 based on 30 reviews on Rotten Tomatoes. On Metacritic the film has a weighted average score of 62 out of 100 based on 12 reviews, indicating "generally favorable reviews".

== Release ==
Yomeddine was selected to compete for the Palme d'Or at the 71st Cannes Film Festival, where it had its world premiere on 9 May 2018. The film was also screened in the official competition of the 2nd El Gouna Film Festival on 21 September 2018. At the festival's closing ceremony, Yomeddine was awarded the El Gouna Star for Best Arabic Narrative Film and was the co-recipient of the Cinema for Humanity Audience Award.

Yomeddine received a theatrical release in France by Le Pacte on 21 November 2018. On 18 September 2018, Strand Releasing acquired the North American distribution rights for the film. In May 2019, Strand Releasing premiered Yomeddine at IFC Center in New York as well as three Los Angeles' locations including the Laemmle on the Westside and various theatres in Pasadena and the San Fernando Valley.

== See also ==
- List of submissions to the 91st Academy Awards for Best Foreign Language Film
- List of Egyptian submissions for the Academy Award for Best Foreign Language Film
