= Johannes Krisch =

Austrian actor (1966–2026)

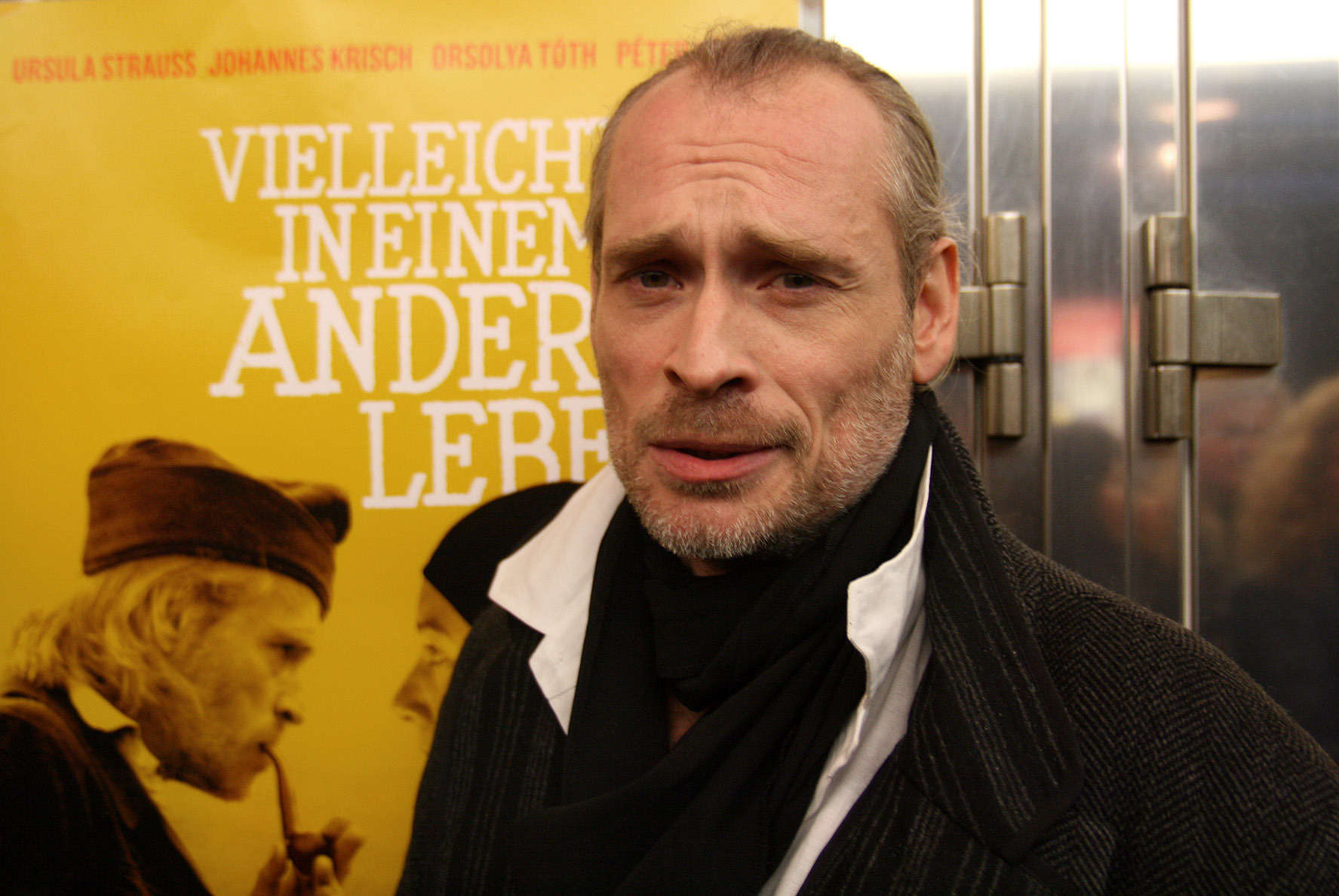
- Krisch in 2011
- Born: 8 December 1966; Vienna, Austria
- Died: 27 July 2026 (aged 59); Vienna, Austria
- Occupation: Actor
- Years active: 1987–2026

Johannes Krisch (8 December 1966 – 27 July 2026) was an Austrian actor. He appeared in more than forty films from 1987 to 2026.

Krisch died on 27 July 2026, at the age of 59.

== Selected filmography ==
Year	Title	Role	Notes
2004–2018	Tatort	Reinhard Gasser	TV series (2004)
2004–2018	Tatort	Kiras Stiefwasser	TV series (2011)
2004–2018	Tatort	Marko Jukic	TV series (2018)
2008	Revanche	Alex	
2011	The Fatherless	Hans	
2011	360	Rocco	
2014	Lose My Self	Tore Ferben	
2014	Labyrinth of Lies		
2015	Jack		
2016	Original Bliss	Christoph Brindel	
2016	A Cure for Wellness	The Caretaker	
2017	In the Fade	Verteidiger Hartenbeck	
2018	Die Protokollantin	Damir Mitkovic	TV Mini Series
2019	Die Toten von Salzburg: Mordwasser	Robert Kendelbacher	TV series episode
2019	A Hidden Life	Miller	
2019	Maria Theresia	Pater Johannes	TV Mini Series
2020	Narcissus and Goldmund	Goldmund's Father	
2022	Märzengrund	Elias (älter)	
2025	The Phoenician Scheme	Cardinal	
2026	The Stories	Elizabeth's father	Egyptian-Austrian Drama
