= Brigitte Kren =

Austrian actress (born 1954)

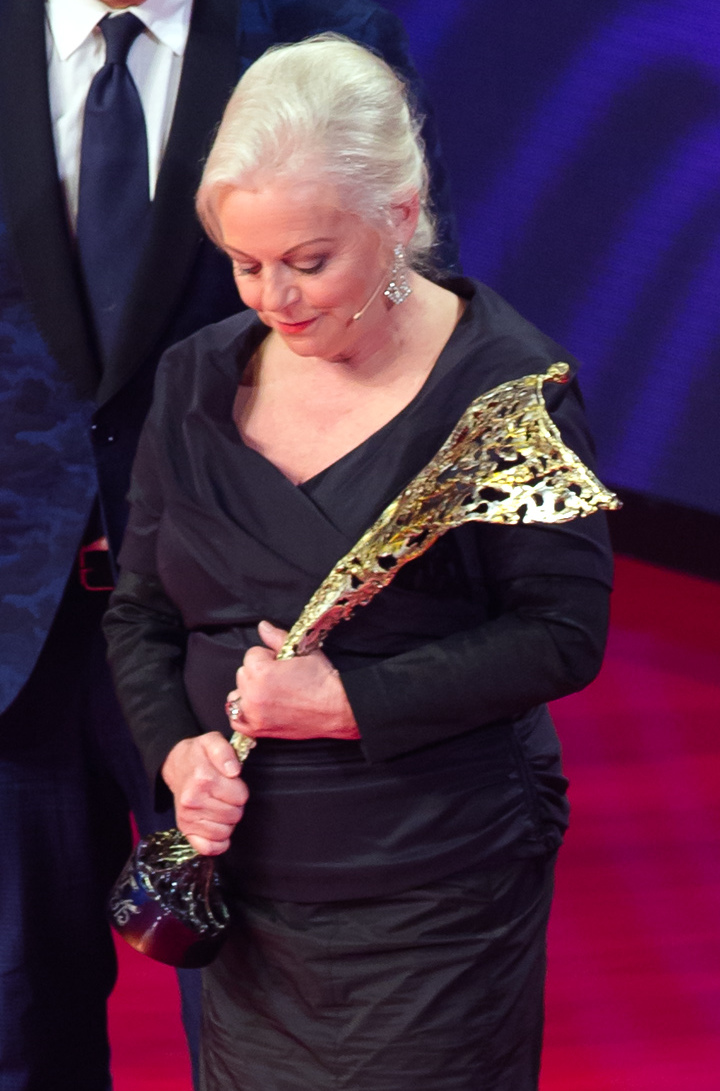
- Born: 1954 (age 71–72); Graz, Austria
- Occupation: Actress

Brigitte Kren (born 27 January 1954) is an Austrian actress who has had leading roles in films and television shows. She participated in Dancing Stars Austria season 7.

== Films ==
- Ant Street (1995) as Rosi Freitag
- Northern Skirts (1999) as Gitti
- Slugs as Anita
- The Debt as Frau Bernhardt / Nurse
- Blood Glacier as Minister Bodicek

== TV series ==
- Vier Frauen und ein Todesfall, Four Women and a Funeral, 2005
- Bettys Diagnose - 2017
- SOKO Donau - 2018

Freud 2020
