= The Silent Mountain =

2014 Austrian-Italian-American war film

- DVD cover
- Directed by: Ernst Gossner
- Written by: Clemens Aufderklamm
- Produced by: Heinz Stussak; Ernst Gossner
- Starring: William Moseley; Claudia Cardinale; Eugenia Costantini; Fritz Karl
- Cinematography: Daniela Knapp
- Edited by: Florian Miosge; Janine Dauterich; Evi Romen
- Music by: Gregor Narholz
- Distributed by: Highest Cinemas (india Saarc)
- Release date: March 14, 2014
- Running time: 98 minutes
- Country: Austria Italy United States
- Language: English

The Silent Mountain is a 2014 Austrian war film written by Clemens Aufderklamm and produced and directed by Ernst Gossner set in the Alpine Front of World War I. The Silent Mountain is a love story set in the Dolomites at the outbreak of hostilities between Italy and Austria-Hungary in 1915.

== Plot ==
The story begins in May 1915 in South Tyrol where Anderl Gruber, a son of a rich hotel owner, is attending the wedding of his sister Elisabeth (Lisl) with Italian Angelo Calzolari. There, he meets Angelo's sister Francesca, with whom he falls in love. However, the same day Italy declares war on Austria-Hungary. The tensions present between Austrians and Italians immediately escalate into the conflict between them, and they both join their respective armies. With the expulsion of the Italians, by the villagers Francesca is forced to hide her identity. However, Fritz Weinberger, a local teacher who returns from the front and who has particularly strong hatred towards Italians, exploits this and offers Francesca to protect her identity in exchange for sexual favors.

An Austro-Hungarian Army platoon that occupies the adjacent mountains tricks the attacking Italians into retreating. Later. they are reinforced by a German Alpenkorps unit. Anderl is wounded in a massive battle and ends up in the hotel Gruber, which is now a field hospital for wounded Austrian soldiers. Meanwhile, Anderl discovers Francesca's affair with Fritz and returns to the front in such a rage that he single-handedly repulses a massive attack of Italian infantry. Andrerl is severely wounded again. As the following Italian offensives also fail, Nicola Quinziato, the commander of Italian garrison, orders Angelo, an experienced civil engineer, to dig a tunnel below the Austrian positions. Initially it is planned to launch an offensive through the tunnels, but later Quinziato decides to set the explosives below the mountain to blow up the Austrian troops. Angelo is discharged immediately after that and sent to the regular infantry, thus exposing him to the dangers of the war.

Some time later, Angelo is caught by the Austrians where he reveals the Italian plans to blow up the mountain. Anderl helps Angelo to return to their village, while the German and Austrian troops decide to hold the mountain despite the imminent danger. Unfortunately, Angelo's identity is quickly discovered and he is summarily executed by the Austrian troops, with Elisabeth watching.

Anderl looks for Francesca, forgives her and leads her out of the village to the mountains. They arrive close to the Austrian positions in the moment of explosion, which annihilates the Austrian stronghold. They then leave the valley and Anderl later often thinks about their mountain, a mountain without the soldiers.

== Cast ==
- William Moseley as Anderl Gruber
- Eugenia Costantini as Francesca Calzolari
- Claudia Cardinale as Nuria Calzolari
- Harald Windisch as Karl Gruber
- Fritz Karl as Fritz Weinberger
- Werner Daehn as Sven Kornatz
- Emily Cox as Lisl Gruber
- Brigitte Jaufenthaler as Anna Gruber
- Julia Gschnitzer as Anastasia Gruber

== Release ==
The film was a box-office success in Austria and Italy in March 2014 and sold to more than 60 countries worldwide. It was released in the United States on August 19, 2014.

== Production ==
The Silent Mountain was shot in various locations in the Dolomites in South Tirol, Trentino, Tirol and Cortina d'Ampezzo. The story is inspired by the actual events during the Mountain War between 1915 and 1918.

In 2012 it was announced by Paradigm's manager David Guillod and his attorney Lev Ginsburg that William Moseley will star in a film along with Eugenia Costantini and Claudia Cardinale.

The crew and cast was struck by lightning while shooting in the mountains. William Moseley was hit as was the camerawoman. She was looking through the viewfinder as the lightning struck and went through the iron body through her eye to her optical nerve and burnt it.

A battlefield set was destroyed and flushed into a nearby river by a mud slide.
