= Marvin Kren =

Austrian director (born 1980)

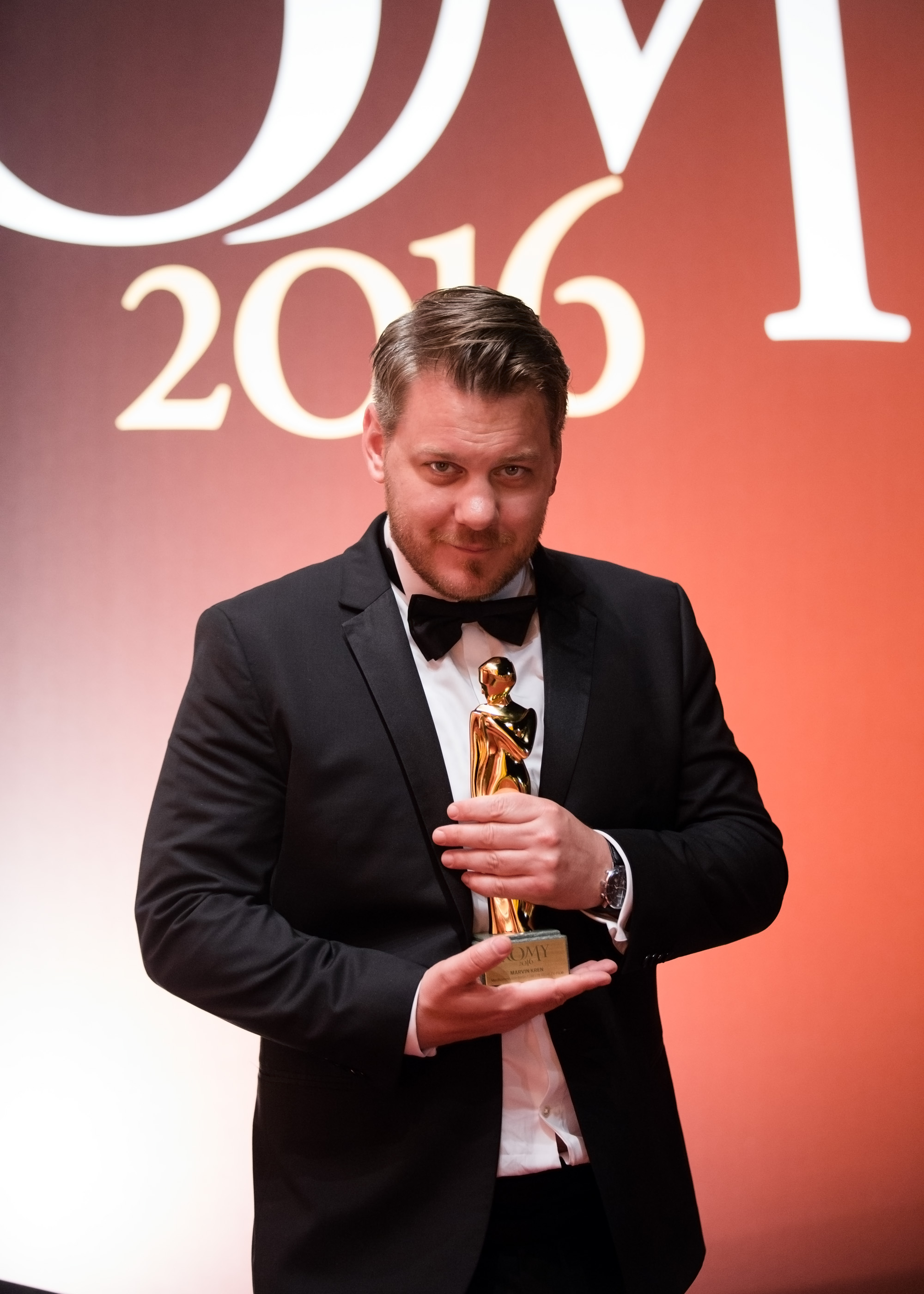
- Marvin Kren in 2016
- Born: 1980 (age 45–46); Vienna, Austria
- Occupation: Film director

Marvin Kren (born 1980) is an Austrian director. He is best known for his work in the horror film genre.

== Filmography ==
Year	Film	Credit	Notes
2002	Julia – Eine ungewöhnliche Frau	Actor	Episode: "Reidingers Sturz"
2005	Zum Beispiel Praterstern	Director, writer, editor, executive producer	Short film
2005	You Bet Your Life	Actor	
2007	Molly & Mops	Actor	Television film
2008	Trio	Director	Short film
2009	Schautag	Director	Short film
2010	Rammbock	Director	
2013	Blood Glacier	Director	
2014	ABCs of Death 2	Director	Segment: "R is for Roulette"
2014-2015	Tatort	Director	Episodes: "Kaltstart", "Die Feigheit des Löwen", "Die letzte Wiesn"
2015	Berlin One	Director	Television film
2017	4 Blocks	Director, writer	Episodes: "Brüder", "Die falsche Neun", "Ibrahim", "Verrat", "Machtlos", "Dead Man Walking"
