= One Way Trip 3D =

- Film poster
- Directed by: Markus Welter
- Written by: Matthias Bauer; Bastian Zach
- Starring: Sabrina Reiter
- Cinematography: Filip Zumbrunn
- Edited by: Cécile Welter
- Release date: September 2011
- Running time: 85 minutes
- Countries: Austria; Switzerland
- Language: German

One Way Trip 3D is a 2011 Austrian-Swiss 3D horror film directed by Markus Welter. It follows a group of young people whose camping trip in the Jura turns into a deadly ordeal after they seek shelter in a remote farmhouse. The film opened in sixth place in German-speaking Switzerland on its opening weekend and was later screened at several festivals.

== Synopsis ==
A group of eight young people travel to the Jura with provisions and tents during mushroom season. Their trip takes a violent turn when one of them returns from fetching beer with severe facial injuries and collapses by the campfire. As a storm rises and their phones stop working, they take shelter in a nearby farmhouse, where they become trapped and are hunted by sinister pursuers.

== Cast ==
The cast includes:

- Sabrina Reiter as Valerie
- Melanie Winiger as Marlene
- Herbert Leiser as Pius
- Martin Loos as Robert
- Aaron Hitz as Mike
- Matthias Britschgi as Lars
- Simon Käser as Thomas
- Isabelle Barth as Sarah
- Harry Lampl as Timo
- Tanja Raunig as Lilli

== Release and reception ==
The film opened in sixth place in German-speaking Switzerland on its opening weekend. Limmattaler Zeitung described the film as the first Swiss 3-D film. It wrote that the film follows familiar horror conventions, and praised the cast, especially Sabrina Reiter, but criticised the later violence as too explicit and too bloody after the earlier suspense. Kino-Zeit wrote that the film was atmospheric but offered little that was new apart from its 3D effects. The review also criticised its slow pacing and said the characters remained one-dimensional. OutNow wrote that the film became fairly watchable in its second half, and praised Sabrina Reiter and the film’s setting, but criticised the dialogue and the 3D effects.

== Festival screenings ==
The film premiered in 2011. It was later screened at festivals including the Solothurn Film Festival, the Filmfestival Max Ophüls Preis in Saarbrücken, and the Brussels International Fantastic Film Festival in 2012, and the Nocturna Madrid International Fantastic Film Festival in 2013.
