= Abu Bakr Shawky =

Egyptian-Austrian writer and director

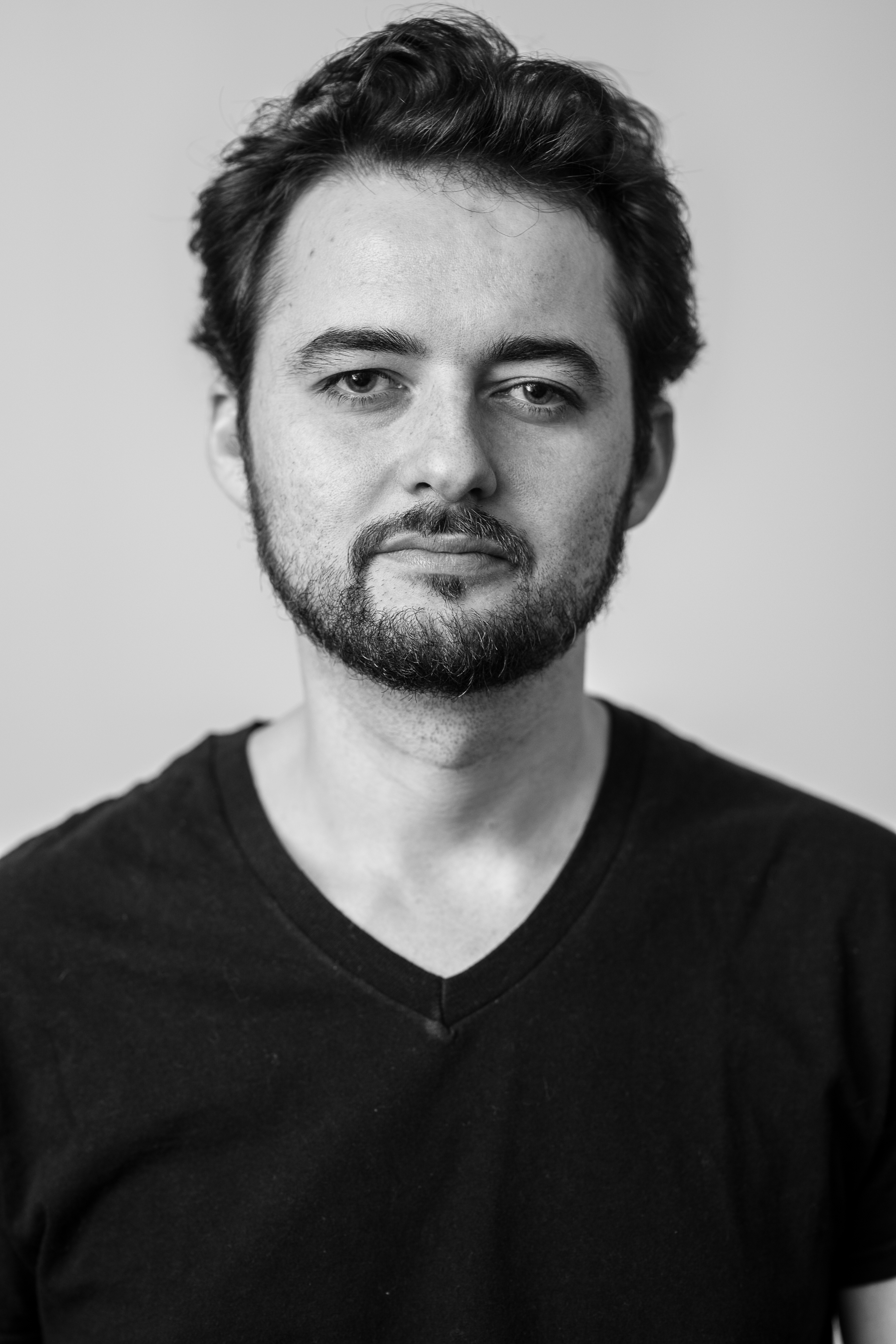
- Born: November 6, 1985 (age 40)
- Education: New York University Tisch School of the Arts; American University in Cairo; High Institute of Cinema - Egypt
- Occupations: Writer, director

Abu Bakr Shawky (Arabic: أبو بكر شوقي) is an Egyptian-Austrian writer and director. His first feature film, Yomeddine, was selected to participate in the 2018 Cannes Film Festival and was screened in the Main Competition section and compete for the Palme d'Or. The film also won the Silver Tanit Award for Best Feature Film at the Carthage International Film Festival.

== Early life and education ==
Shawky studied political science at the American University in Cairo, and film directing at the High Institute of Cinema in Cairo. He received a Master of Fine Arts in film and TV production from New York University's Tisch School of the Arts in 2016.

== Career ==
Shawky's career in filmmaking began with short films, including "The Colony" (2008), a short documentary that won several awards at film festivals, and "Things I Heard on Wednesdays" (2012), which was featured at festivals such as New York Film Festival and Palm Springs International Film Festival. His first feature film, "Yomeddine" (2018), brought Shawky international acclaim. The film premiered in the main competition at the Cannes Film Festival in 2018 and was Egypt’s submission for the Best Foreign Language Film at the 91st Academy Awards. "Yomeddine" won numerous awards, including the Francois Chalais Prize at Cannes, the Reflet d’Or for Best Feature Film at the Geneva Film Festival and the Silver Tanit at Carthage Film Festival. In 2023, his film "Hajjan" premiered at Toronto International Film Festival and won several awards the following year, including Best Director at the Hollywood Arab Film Festival and Best Film at the Gulf Cinema Festival. In addition to his work in film, Shawky founded Desert Highway Pictures LLC, an independent film production company based in Cairo, and has held positions such as Writers Assistant and Arabic Consultant for the Hulu TV series "The Looming Tower" at Legendary Entertainment.

== Filmography ==
Year	English Title	Original Title	Notes
2018	Yomeddine	يوم الدين	François Chalais Prize at the 2018 Cannes Film Festival
2019	30/30 Vision: 3 Decades of Strand Releasing (segment "Friday")		Anthology film
2023	Hajjan	هجّان	
2025	The Stories	القصص	

== Awards and honors ==
Shawky has received numerous grants and fellowships, and was named MENA Talent of the Year award by Variety Magazine in 2018. He has been featured in GQ Magazine as "Egyptian Cinema’s Dark Horse" and listed among "Cannes’ Hottest Directors" by The Wrap Magazine. Forbes Magazine has named him among the top five Arab directors on the global stage. His commercial work has also been recognized, with his commercial "Water From Another World" winning Best International Commercial at the Porsche Awards Stuttgart.
