= Hoshi =

Hoshi or Hosi/Hoshni (星) is the Japanese word for "Star", and the Japanese word for a Buddhist "Priest" &/or "Monk" (僧, 法師 and 比丘).

Hoshi may also refer to:

== People with the surname ==
- Chisato Hoshi (星 千智, born 1995), Japanese badminton athlete
- Hamuko Hoshi (星 ハム子, born 1982), Japanese professional wrestler
- Mizue Hoshi (星 瑞枝, born 1985), Japanese alpine skier
- Nobuyoshi Hoshi (保志 信芳) or Hokutoumi Nobuyoshi, Japanese sumo wrestler
- Shinichi Hoshi (星 新一, 1926–1997), Japanese novelist and science fiction writer
- Shizuko Hoshi, Japanese-American actress, theatre director, dancer, and choreographer
- Sōichirō Hoshi (保志 総一朗, born 1972), Japanese voice actor and singer
- Tomoya Hoshi (星 知弥, born 1994), Japanese baseball player
- Tōru Hoshi (星 亨, 1850–1901), Japanese politician and cabinet minister
- Yoko Hoshi (星 ようこ, born 1966), Japanese actress
- Yoshiaki Hoshi (星 吉昭, 1946–2004), Japanese musician
- Yuriko Hoshi (星 由里子, 1943–2018), Japanese actress

== Arts and entertainment ==
=== Anime and manga ===
- Hoshi Mamoru Inu or Stargazing Dog, a Japanese manga series by Takashi Murakami
- Hoshi no Furumachi, a Japanese manga series by Hidenori Hara
- Hoshi no Ko Chobin, a Japanese anime series created by Shotaro Ishinomori
- Hoshi no Ko Poron, a Japanese anime series produced by Jiho Eigasha
- Hoshi no Koe or Voices of a Distant Star, a Japanese OVA directed by Makoto Shinkai
- Hoshi o Katta Hi, a Japanese anime short film directed by Hayao Miyazaki
- Hoshi wa Utau or Twinkle Stars, a Japanese manga series by Natsuki Takaya
- La Seine no Hoshi, a Japanese anime series based on the movie La Tulipe Noire
- Hoshi no Kirby, a Japanese anime series based on the Kirby series, named Kirby: Right Back at Ya! in English

=== Fictional characters ===
- Doctor Light (Kimiyo Hoshi), a superhero in American comic books published by DC Comics
- Hoshi, a character in the Japanese manga series Arakawa Under the Bridge
- Hoshi Sato, a character in the American television series Star Trek: Enterprise
- Lieutenant Hoshi, a character in the American sci-fi media franchise Battlestar Galactica
- Ryoma Hoshi, a character in the Japanese visual novel game Danganronpa V3: Killing Harmony
- Ryu Hoshi, a character in the 1994 Japanese-American action film Street Fighter

=== Film and television ===
- Hoshi no Furumachi (film), a 2011 Japanese film based on the manga of the same name
- Hoshi no Kinka, a 1995 Japanese television drama series
- Hoshi Mamoru Inu, a 2011 Japanese film based on the manga of the same name

=== Games ===
- Hoshi no Kirby, a Japanese video game series published by Nintendo, named only Kirby in English
- Hoshi Wo Miru Hito, a 1987 Japanese video game for the Famicom home console

=== Music ===
- Hoshi kara Kita Futari, a 1978 album by Japanese pop duo Pink Lady
- "Hoshi no Hate", a 2011 song by Japanese pop singer Alisa Mizuki

=== Singers ===
- Hoshi (French singer), French singer, born 1996
- Hoshi (South Korean singer), South Korean singer, born 1996

== Other uses ==
- Hoshi (Go) (星), an intersection marked with a small dot in the board game Go
- Hōshi Ryokan, a traditional Japanese inn founded in 718 AD
- Hoshi University, a private Japanese university specializing in pharmaceutical sciences

== See also ==
- Hoshii (disambiguation)
- Biwa hōshi (法師), historical Japanese traveling performers
- "Kagayakeru Hoshi", a 1997 song by Japanese pop singer Miho Komatsu
