= Songs for the Exhausted =

Studio album by Naked Lunch
- Released: March 1, 2004
- Recorded: 2002–2003, Fuzzroom, Klagenfurt
- Genre: Electronica, indie
- Length: 40:46
- Label: Motor Music Records
- Producer: Naked Lunch

Naked Lunch chronology
Love Junkies (1999)	Songs for the Exhausted (2004)	This Atom Heart Of Ours (2007)

Songs for the Exhausted is the fourth full-length studio album by Austrian indie-band Naked Lunch. It was received with critical praise in Germany and Austria and sold surprisingly well. It was the band's first album after a five year-hiatus, following the flopping of Love Junkies, which caused them being dropped by their record label. Recorded in the wake of this backslashing event, most of the songs are dominated by a sad, bleak tone. Also, one of the songs, "King George" was written about the death of the group ex-bass player, Georg Timber-Trattnig.

The album was followed by several tours and an EP (Stay), in 2005.

== Track listing (CD) ==
1. God – 4:52
2. First Man on the Sun – 3:51
3. King George – 3:37
4. Stay – 4:38
5. Lost it all – 3:04
6. In your Room – 4:37
7. The Deal – 3:54
8. Man without Past – 4:05
9. Solitude – 4:15
10. The Retainer – 3:51

== Credits ==
All songs/lyrics by Oliver Welter, all music by Oliver Welter, Herwig Zamernik, Stefan Deisenberger and Olaf Opal.

Played by Naked Lunch: Oliver Welter (vocals and guitar), Herwig Zamernik (bass guitar), Stefan Deisenberger (keyboards), Thorsten Thonhauser (drums) and Olaf Opal (electronics).

with guests:

- Mario Kofler - drums on 1/5/9
- Ingo Weber - drums on 2/7
- Michi Malicka - bass on 1/5
- Ritchi Klammer - horns on 2/8
- Sebastian Schumacher - cello on 10
- Klaus Lippitsch - percussions

== Miscellanea ==
- Videos were made for"God" and "Stay", by befriended film-maker Thomas Woschitz. They later accused the German metal band Rammstein of copying their "God" video for one of their own videos, "Ohne dich".
- "Stay" was released as the sole single/EP, in 2005.
