= Bad Luck (2015 film) =

2015 film by Thomas Woschitz

- Official poster
- Directed by: Thomas Woschitz
- Written by: Thomas Woschitz
- Produced by: Gabriele Kranzelbinder
- Starring: Valerie Pachner, Markus Schwärzer, Thomas Oraže, Christian Zankl, Josef Smretschnig, Ernestine Schmerlaib, Gerhard Kubelka
- Cinematography: Enzo Brandner
- Edited by: Hannes Starz
- Music by: Manfred Plessl, Oliver Welter
- Release date: 29 May 2015
- Running time: 80 minutes
- Country: Austria
- Language: German

Bad Luck is a 2015 Austrian tragic-comic film directed by Thomas Woschitz. It debuted at the 36. Filmfestival Max Ophüls Preis 2015.

== Plot ==
Bad Luck has three interlinked episodes: Dagmar is kicked out of her flat, Lippo is sacked by his boss and Karl is seriously in debt. Then there is Rizzo, who just doesn't fit in. Their lives cross unexpectedly at a petrol station somewhere in rural Carinthia.

== Cast ==
- Christian Zankl – Rizzo
- Markus Schwärzer – Robert
- Valerie Pachner – Dagmar
- Thomas Oraze – Lippo
- Josef Smretschnig – Karl
- Ernestine Schmerlaib – Susi
- Gerhard Kubelka – Gerhard
- Karl Wutte – Walter Dreier

== Music ==
The music for the film was composed by Manfred Plessl and Oliver Welter from the Austrian group Naked Lunch.
