= List of Cardcaptor Sakura chapters =

The cover of the first volume of the Cardcaptor Sakura manga released by Kodansha on November 22, 1996, in Japan

The manga series Cardcaptor Sakura is written and illustrated by the manga artist group Clamp. The first chapter premiered in the June 1996 issue of Nakayoshi, where it was serialized monthly until its conclusion in the August 2000 issue. The series focuses on Sakura Kinomoto, a fourth grade elementary school student who discovers that she possesses magical powers after accidentally freeing a set of magical cards from the book in which they had been sealed for years. She is tasked with retrieving those cards in order to avoid an unknown catastrophe from befalling the world.

The 50 unnamed chapters were collected and published in 12 tankōbon volumes by Kodansha starting on November 22, 1996; the last volume was released on July 31, 2000. Kodansha re-released the series in a hardcover edition from March 5, 2004, to February 2, 2005. Starting in March 2015, Kodansha began re-releasing the series in a nine-volume special edition to commemorate the 60th anniversary of Nakayoshi. Cardcaptor Sakura was adapted into a 70-episode anime series by Madhouse that aired in Japan on NHK from April 8, 1998, to March 21, 2000. Madhouse also produced two animated films released in 1999 and 2000. The manga series is licensed for regional language releases by Pika Édition in France, Star Comics in Italy, Egmont Manga & Anime in Germany, Editora JBC in Brazil, Ever Glory Publishing in Taiwan, Glènat España in Spain, Editorial Ivrea in Argentina, and Editorial Toukan in Mexico.

Kodansha released the first six volumes in bilingual editions that included both Japanese and English from May 12, 2000, to July 13, 2001. Cardcaptor Sakura was licensed for an English-language release in North America by Tokyopop. It released the volumes of Cardcaptor Sakura from March 1, 2000, to August 5, 2003. Tokyopop released the first six volumes with the book "flipped" from the original Japanese orientation, in which the book is read from right-to-left, to the Western format with text oriented from left-to-right. Volumes seven through twelve were released in the original orientation with the subtitle Master of the Clow. On October 7, 2003, and May 4, 2004, Tokyopop re-released the first six volumes in two box sets, each containing three volumes. The re-released volumes were updated to match the orientation and cover styling of the final six volumes. They were also released individually from July 6, 2004, to June 7, 2005. Madman Entertainment used Tokyopop's English translation to release the series in Australia and New Zealand. Dark Horse Manga published an English edition of the series in four omnibus volumes containing three of the original volumes each from October 2010 to September 2012.

== Volume list ==
=== Cardcaptor Sakura ===
No.	Original release date	Original ISBN	English release date	English ISBN
1	November 22, 1996 (paperback); May 12, 2000 (bilingual); March 5, 2004 (hardcover)	978-4-06-319743-3 (paperback); 978-4-7700-2644-6 (bilingual); 978-4-06-364556-9 (hardcover)	March 1, 2000 (original release); July 6, 2004 (re-release); October 20, 2010 (omnibus 1)	978-1-892213-36-5 (original release); 978-1-59182-878-5 (re-release); 978-1-59582-522-3 (omnibus 1)
Chapters 1–5
Sakura finds the Clow Book in her father's basement library and accidentally releases the Clow Card. The guardian beast of the seal, Kero, reveals that the cards were created by a powerful sorcerer named Clow Reed, and with the cards released, disaster will befall the world. Kero fosters a contract between Sakura and the Clow Key to make her into a Cardcaptor. He tasks her with capturing the cards and returning them to the Clow Book. Cards captured: Windy, Wood, Jump, Watery, and Illusion.
2	April 4, 1997 (paperback); August 10, 2000 (bilingual); April 3, 2004 (hardcover)	978-4-06-319791-4 (paperback); 978-4-7700-2645-3 (bilingual); 978-4-06-364560-6 (hardcover)	December 31, 2000 (original release); September 14, 2004 (re-release); October 20, 2010 (omnibus 1)	978-1-892213-50-1 (original release); 978-1-59182-879-2 (re-release); 978-1-59582-522-3 (omnibus 1)
Chapters 6–10
Sakura's rival, Li Syaoran, transfers into her school from Hong Kong. He also seeks to capture the Clow Cards to prevent evil from befalling the world, but doesn't trust Sakura's abilities to succeed. Cards captured: Flower, Sword, Thunder, and Shadow.
3	August 4, 1997 (paperback); December 8, 2000 (bilingual); April 26, 2004 (hardcover)	978-4-06-319844-7 (paperback); 978-4-7700-2740-5 (bilingual); 978-4-06-364567-5 (hardcover)	May 2001 (original release); November 9, 2004 (re-release); October 20, 2010 (omnibus 1)	978-1-892213-59-4 (original release); 978-1-59182-880-8 (re-release); 978-1-59582-522-3 (omnibus 1)
Chapters 11–14
Sakura gets a new math teacher, Kaho Mizuki, who has romantic history with her older brother. Syaoran immediately distrusts her as he senses immense magical power from her. Cards captured: Mirror and Shield.
4	December 5, 1997 (paperback); March 9, 2001 (bilingual); June 2, 2004 (hardcover)	978-4-06-319881-2 (paperback); 978-4-7700-2744-3 (bilingual); 978-4-06-364575-0 (hardcover)	September 30, 2001 (original release); February 8, 2005 (re-release); July 27, 2011 (omnibus 2)	978-1-892213-56-3 (original release); 978-1-59182-881-5 (re-release); 978-1-59582-591-9 (omnibus 2)
Chapters 15–18
Sakura, Syaoran and Tomoyo find themselves in a maze created by one of the Clow Cards. Toya reflects on the time when he was in a relationship with Sakura's new math teacher, Kaho Mizuki, and how it ended before she left Tomoeda. In the present, Kaho helps Sakura, Tomoyo and Syaoran find a way out of the maze. Sakura goes on a field trip where she enters a cave and obtains the Erase card. Sakura attends a festival and Kaho reveals to Toya that she returned because "something is about to happen." Cards captured: Maze, Erase, and Glow.
5	April 4, 1998 (paperback); April 27, 2001 (bilingual); July 3, 2004 (hardcover)	978-4-06-319924-6 (paperback); 978-4-7700-2745-0 (bilingual); 978-4-06-364583-5 (hardcover)	December 31, 2001 (original release); April 12, 2005 (re-release); July 27, 2011 (omnibus 2)	978-1-892213-73-0 (original release); 978-1-59182-882-2 (re-release); 978-1-59582-591-9 (omnibus 2)
Chapters 19–22
Kaho Mizuki seeks Kero out and they discuss what will happen to the world. Kero believes Mizuki is his lunar counterpart, Yue. He asks if she intends to intervene, but Mizuki says she has a different role to play. Sakura later meets Mizuki at a café where she learns that Mizuki knows of the Clow Cards and of "The Judge, Yue." Cards captured: Dark and Light.
6	July 13, 1998 (paperback); July 13, 2001 (bilingual); August 4, 2004 (hardcover)	978-4-06-333954-3 (paperback); 978-4-7700-2882-2 (bilingual); 978-4-06-364589-7 (hardcover)	April 2002 (original release); June 7, 2005 (re-release); July 27, 2011 (omnibus 2)	978-1-892213-74-7 (original release); 978-1-59182-883-9 (re-release); 978-1-59582-591-9 (omnibus 2)
Chapters 23–26
When Sakura captures the Firey Card, Kero transforms into his true form: Cerberus. When Sakura captures the final card, her judgment begins. Yukito, the object of Sakura and Syaoran's affections is revealed to be Yue, the Judge. In order to be master of the Clow Cards, Sakura must defeat Yue. If she loses, everyone involved with the Clow Cards will lose their memory of the one they love most. Sakura seemingly loses the trial, but the Clow Cards attempt to defend her. Kaho Mizuki presents Sakura with Clow Reed's bell, transforming her staff. Powered up, Sakura defeats Yue. After she is recognized as the cards' true master, an apparition of Clow Reed meets Sakura to explain her new power and that he may make things difficult for her soon. Kaho Mizuki then departs Tomoeda. Cards captured: Firey and Earthy.
7	November 13, 1998 (paperback); September 3, 2004 (hardcover)	978-4-06-333989-5 (paperback); 978-4-06-364598-9 (hardcover)	August 20, 2002 (original release); January 25, 2012 (omnibus 3)	978-1-892213-75-4 (original release); 978-1-59582-808-8 (omnibus 3)
Chapters 27–30
A new transfer student arrives at Tomoeda Elementary, Eriol Hiiragizawa from England. Sakura senses she's somehow met him before. They become friends, but Syaoran immediately distrusts him. Meanwhile, a new transfer student arrives at Toya's high school, Nakuru Akizuki. When Sakura goes to investigate a mysterious phenomenon in Tomoeda, her magic fails to work. Kero meets with Yue to discuss what magic could be at play. When they return to the scene of the phenomenon, neither can move, and both feel the familiar magical presence of Clow Reed. Sakura fosters a new kind of magic and transforms the Clow Card under her own power to use their magic and solve the mysterious phenomenons. Having expended too much magic, Sakura faints. She learns that managing Cerberus and Yue as well as transforming her Clow Cards into Sakura Cards will take a physical toll on her. Meanwhile, Eriol is revealed to be the reincarnated Clow Reed, and lives with Nakuru and a small beast similar to Kero, Spinel. Under his magic, they transform to become Ruby Moon and Spinel Sun. Cards transformed: Firey and Sword.
8	March 11, 1999 (paperback); October 4, 2004 (hardcover)	978-4-06-334049-5 (paperback); 978-4-06-364601-6 (hardcover)	December 10, 2002 (original release); January 25, 2012 (omnibus 3)	978-1-892213-76-1 (original release); 978-1-59582-808-8 (omnibus 3)
Chapters 31–34
Syaoran begins to develop feelings for Sakura. Cards transformed: Jump, Fly, Mirror, Windy, and Flower.
9	July 22, 1999 (paperback); November 2, 2004 (hardcover)	978-4-06-334099-0 (paperback); 978-4-06-364604-7 (hardcover)	February 4, 2003 (original release); January 25, 2012 (omnibus 3)	978-1-892213-77-8 (original release); 978-1-59582-808-8 (omnibus 3)
Chapters 35–38
Lacking in power, Yue's civilian form Yukito can't sustain his energy. If Yue doesn't receive magical energy to fortify him, Yue and Yukito may both disappear. Yue discovers Clow Reed in Eriol's form and confronts him, but Eriol erases his memory and reverts him back to Yukito. Syaoran finally confesses his feelings for Sakura, but she doesn't hear because of a nearby panic when Yukito faints. When they're alone, Toya tells Yukito he knows he's not human, and Yue takes over so the two can have a conversation. Toya agrees to sacrifice his magic, including his ability to see his mother's spirit and sense when Sakura's in danger, in order to keep Yue and Yukito from disappearing from existence. Cards transformed: Erase, Earthy, and Shadow.
10	December 3, 1999 (paperback); December 3, 2004 (hardcover)	978-4-06-334259-8 (paperback); 978-4-06-364612-2 (hardcover)	April 8, 2003 (original release); September 19, 2012 (omnibus 4)	978-1-892213-78-5 (original release); 978-1-59582-889-7 (omnibus 4)
Chapters 39–42
Sakura feels guilty that Toya had to give up his powers to sustain Yue since Sakura wasn't strong enough. Sakura confesses her feelings to Yukito, but he assures her that he is not the one she loves the most even though she does love him. Sakura asks if her brother is the one Yukito loves most and he confirms it to be true, but isn't sure if it's reciprocated. Sakura is sure Toya feels the same. Yukito tells Sakura that she will find someone else to love and that person will love her more than anyone. Sad over being gently rejected by Yukito, she tells Syaoran what Yukito said to her. Deciding not to tell Sakura how he feels about her at that moment, Syaoran holds Sakura gently and assures her that she will find that person. When Yukito comes to check up on Toya, who is recovering in bed, he reveals to Yukito that he loves him by saying that what happened to Yukito after he met Toya was real (touching his face gently while saying this) and that it doesn't matter to him if Yukito isn't human; he just wants him to always be by his side, giving him his "sappy smile." When danger erupts at the school, Sakura manages to find Eriol with his magical staff, but she faints before she can confront him. Sakura sees a vision of Clow Reed's last living day. Transformed cards: Maze, Illusion, Wood, Thunder, and Glow.
11	February 24, 2000 (paperback); December 28, 2004 (hardcover)	978-4-06-334286-4 (paperback); 978-4-06-364616-0 (hardcover)	June 10, 2003 (original release); September 19, 2012 (omnibus 4)	978-1-892213-79-2 (original release); 978-1-59582-889-7 (omnibus 4)
Chapters 43–45
Sakura, Syaoran, Tomoyo, and Kero travel to Tokyo Tower and are confronted by Eriol, who reveals his past life as Clow Reed. Nakuru and Spinel reveal their true forms as well. Elsewhere, Yukito spontaneously transforms into Yue, who detects Sakura is in danger. Eriol's magic makes the sun and moon disappear and Tomoyo instantly falls to sleep. By Yue's side, Toya and all the non-magical humans of Tomoeda also fall asleep. Eriol tells Sakura if the magic darkness is not lifted by dawn, the people of Tomoeda will sleep forever. Sakura struggles in her face off with Eriol as Kero and Yue engage in combat with Spinel Sun and Ruby Moon. Sakura learns she must transform the Light card in order to break Eriol's spell. Without enough magic to transform Light and Dark, Sakura receives help from Kero, Yue, and Syaoran to successfully transform the cards, the final Sakura Cards, and end Eriol's darkness of sleep on Tomoeda. Sakura's father arrives at the park and it is revealed that Eriol's magic didn't work on him as he is a second reincarnation of Clow Reed; Clow Reed split his soul into Eriol, who retained Clow's memories, and Fujitaka, who was unaware. Eriol leads Sakura in a spell that successfully transfers half of Eriol's magic to Fujitaka, stripping away Eriol's status of being the most powerful magician in the world. In the aftermath, Eriol explains his misdeeds as a way to galvanize Sakura to transform the Clow Cards one by one into Sakura Cards. He apologizes for causing Sakura so much trouble. Spinel reveals that Eriol had been waiting for a long time; using his magic to stay the same age (physically) as Sakura so that he could become her classmate; thereby helping Sakura along the way. Miss Mizuki arrives with a revelation of her own. Transformed Cards: Shield, Watery, Light, and Dark.
12	July 31, 2000 (paperback); February 2, 2005 (hardcover)	978-4-06-334326-7 (paperback); 978-4-06-364625-2 (hardcover)	August 5, 2003 (original release); September 19, 2012 (omnibus 4)	978-1-892213-80-8 (original release); 978-1-59582-889-7 (omnibus 4)
Chapters 46–50
Kaho Mizuki reveals that she is Eriol's accomplice, and played an indirect part in Sakura defeating Yue during her challenge. With his new magic, Fujitaka is able to reunite with Nadeshiko's spirit. Eriol also reveals to Yue (who believes that his beloved master has returned) that while he is Clow Reed's reincarnation, he is only the heir to his memories and not Clow Reed himself; noting sadly that there is no way to bring back the deceased. He explains that this was why Clow left both Yue and Kero under Sakura's care. He notes that he was glad to have met Clow's creations; both Yue and Kero. One morning at school Eriol announces he is returning to England. Eriol and Miss Mizuki reveal their love for one another before returning to England with Spinel Sun and Ruby Moon. While walking home from school with Sakura, Syaoran confesses to Sakura his love for her, telling Sakura that he not only loves her but is the person he loves the most. That night, Sakura reflects on Syaoran's confession and wonders what it is she feels for Syaoran; realizing that what she feels for Syaoran is different to how she felt about Yukito. Sakura seeks advice from Tomoyo, Rika and Chiharu (who reveals to Sakura that she not only loves their classmate Yamazaki but has been in a relationship with him for a long time) before she resolves that she loves Syaoran. When Syaoran tells Sakura he is moving back to Hong Kong, she crafts him a teddy bear. Yukito sees this and asks Sakura if she found the person she loves the most. Sakura replies happily that she did, but is sad, not knowing when she will see Syaoran again. Yukito assures her that they will see each other again as long as they both want to be together. Before Syaoran's coach leaves to take him to the airport, Sakura reaches him with Toya's help (despite his negative feelings about Syaoran) and reciprocates Syaoran's feelings, telling Syaoran that he is her "Number One;" the person she loves the most. Syaoran happily takes the bear, knowing that Sakura feels the same about him, and they agree to name their respective bears after each other. As his coach leaves Syaoran promises to return and desperately asks Sakura if she will wait for him, and vows that she will. Over the next few years, Sakura and Syaoran maintain a long-distance relationship. One morning, when Sakura starts Middle School, Syaoran returns and reunites with Sakura, who reveals that he is back for good, and they resolve to be together as an official couple.

=== Cardcaptor Sakura: Clear Card ===
No.	Original release date	Original ISBN	English release date	English ISBN
1	December 2, 2016	978-4-06-393099-3 (regular edition); 978-4-06-358844-6 (special edition)	December 19, 2017	978-1-63236-537-8
Chapters 1–4
Sakura begins middle school. With Syaoran returned from Hong Kong, the two are an official couple and exchange the teddy bears they made for each other. Sakura stays in touch with Eriol, who is now living happily with Kaho. Sakura has a dream in which she sees many transparent, clear cards, and a mysterious entity shrouded in darkness around shattered shards from the clear cards. Upon waking, Sakura discovers her Sakura Cards are now all blank and transparent. She visits Yue in an emergency meeting with Kero to discuss the events. The next night, Sakura has a dream with the mysterious entity and discovers a new magic key formed from her dreams. The mysterious entity attempts to take the key from her. Sakura wakes up to find the key existing in reality. During the day, a mysterious wind gusts at Sakura, and she successfully summons her new staff from the key in her dreams and establishes a new incantation to seal her first Clear Card, Gale. She later secures a second card. Cards secured: Gale and Siege.
2	April 1, 2017	978-4-06-393171-6 (regular edition); 978-4-06-358849-1 (special edition)	February 27, 2018	978-1-63236-538-5
Chapters 5–8; Extra Story
Sakura continues to have dreams in which the mysterious entity attempts to steal her key of dreams. She recognizes the figure is the same height as her. A new transfer student, Akiho Shinomoto, arrives in Sakura's class. The two become fast friends. Syaoran contacts Eriol about the new transfer student, and Eriol shares that she will come to care for Sakura a lot. Toya reveals to Yukito that he has a new magical ability, but will only reveal what it is when the time is right. Cards secured: Aqua, Reflect, and Action. Extra Story summary: While playing online games with Spinel (to a comedically competitive extreme), Sakura walks into her room after coming home looking deeply sad and sighing; not having heard from Syaoran lately. Smiling sadly, Sakura tells Kero that he's probably busy. When Sakura leaves the room to make dinner, Kero looks sad; sorry for her. He tells Spinel that Sakura is a bit down because Syaoran hasn't contacted her; noting that its taking longer for her to hear back from Syaoran. He hopes that Syaoran will come and visit over the next break. After ending the call with Kero, Spinel (who is aware of why Syaoran has been quiet lately) reflects on how he knows Syaoran will be heading to Japan sooner than Kero thinks, but knows that it won't be just for a simple social call. Note: The extra story, which takes place shortly before the events of Clear Card Chapter 1, has never received an anime adaptation, but was instead adapted into a Drama CD that was only released in Japan with a special edition of Clear Card Volume 7.
3	September 13, 2017	978-4-06-393266-9 (regular edition); 978-4-06-397038-8 (special edition)	April 10, 2018	978-1-63236-539-2
Chapters 9–13
Sakura's dreams persist and she recognizes the motif of a clock in her most recent one. Sakura meets Akiho's caretaker, Yuna D. Kaito. When Sakura and Akiho have a playdate together, Akiho suddenly falls asleep and Sakura is certain magic is afoot. Cards secured: Record, Flight, Lucid, and Spiral.
4	March 30, 2018	978-4-06-511307-3 (regular edition); 978-4-06-511308-0 (special edition)	June 26, 2018	978-1-63236-619-1
Chapters 14–19
Sakura successfully secures the Snooze Card, the source of Akiho's sudden slumber. Syaoran investigates Yuna D. Kaito through Eriol, who believes the "D" in his name is derived from a powerful society of English magicians. As Yuna and Akiho are residing in Eriol's former residence, they fear Yuna is using the residence to store away some powerful secret. Meanwhile, Akiho's stuffed animal charm, Momo, is revealed to be a familiar similar to Kero, unbeknownst to Akiho. Momo and Yuna discuss amongst themselves that a pivotal time is close at hand. When Sakura has difficulty combatting a fire bird with the Aqua Card, Syaoran summons a powerful wind spell to help Sakura secure it. Akiho reveals to Yuna that she has recurring dreams of a mysterious figure whom she desperately wants a possession from. Cards secured: Snooze, Labyrinth, Appear, and Blaze.
5	September 3, 2018	978-4-06-513039-1 (regular edition); 978-4-06-512848-0 (special edition)	November 20, 2018	978-1-63236-659-7
Chapters 20–24
Kero and Yue determined that Eriol is hiding something from Sakura about the string of recent events that have occurred. While preparing to go on a date with Syaoran, Sakura is invited to her great-grandfather Masaki's residence, who wishes to give her a family heirloom. Aware of Sakura's relationship with Syaoran, Masaki invites him over as well; interested to know what his great-granddaughter's boyfriend is like and see if Syaoran would make a good future husband for her (Masaki is left impressed with Syaoran). Sakura uses the power of the Record Card to revisit her mother's past, but Nadeshiko's spirit warns Sakura to not venture further, lest she be unable to return to the present. Sakura and Akiho's shared dreams continue to happen and Akiho recognizes the mysterious entity's robes as those of her own. Sakura collapses at her grandfather's residence during one of these dreams. Kero and Yue contact Eriol, irritated at his lack of sharing intel. Eriol shares that Yuna D. Kaito has been renounced from the society of English magicians after a ritual tool went "missing" under his care. Yuna interferes magically with the communication connection between Eriol and Yue and Kero, preventing them from talking further, even over technology. Syaoran fears Sakura's magic is becoming too powerful and will lead her on the road to ruin. It is revealed that Syaoran siphoned the power of Sakura's cards and kept them under his own magic via Sakura's teddy bear. In her latest dream, Sakura sees the mysterious entity is actually Syaoran. Cards secured: Mirror.
6	April 3, 2019	978-4-06-514999-7 (regular edition); 978-4-06-515000-9 (special edition)	November 26, 2019	978-1-63236-719-8
Chapters 25–29; Extra Story (Tomoyo Finder)
Akiho is revealed to be from a long line of sorcerers and to exhibit no magical ability, herself. Kero and Yue sense no power from Akiho. It is revealed that Yuna was a magical prodigy whose magic grew to the point in which his personality became warped. Momo reflects that Yuna is in search of the most dangerous kind of magic and is willing to sacrifice anything to get it. Yue discovers that Syaoran siphoned the Sakura Cards and demands a meeting with him. Syaoran tells him that if Sakura maintained her own cards while creating new ones, her powers would have grown even more exponentially. The Light and Dark cards manifest and explain to Yue that the Sakura Cards went along with Syaoran's plan as they agreed with his logic. Syaoran promises to Yue that he will protect Sakura no matter what. When Akiho's dream state turns her against Sakura, Sakura uses her magic to try to resolve the issue. Syaoran uses The Fly card to join with Sakura and Yuna celebrates the uniting of the three in one place as he freezes time for everyone. At the cost of part of his life force and at the objection of Momo, Yuna turns back time to before this encounter. Yuna reflects that Akiho is the most magical artifact the society of English magicians had to offer. Extra Story (Tomoyo Finder) summary: While having a video call with Kero, Tomoyo is happily surprised to hear from Kero that Sakura and Syaoran have a date that day, with Kero noting that Sakura has been fretting over what to wear over the past two days. Tomoyo is sorry that she won't be there to film Sakura, knowing how important dates are, but Kero reveals that he's tagging along to keep on eye on them; given all the activity that's been happening lately and that Syaoran has a lot on his plate too. Looking serious, Tomoyo agrees, but then cheers up; insisting that she goes with him. Ready with her cellphone and video camera, Tomoyo follows Sakura quietly with Kero as she and Syaoran wave at each other at their meeting place by a lake. Tomoyo is confident that her footage will turn out fine, and hopes that happy, carefree days aren't too far off for Sakura and Syaoran. Kero is sure that they'll be fine, noting that Sakura is on it. Note: In 2018, a Cardcaptor Sakura exhibition was held in Japan that featured several exhibits including one connected to the extra chapter; also called "Tomoyo Finder." Consisting of four illustrations by CLAMP, these depicted photographs that Tomoyo took of Sakura and Syaoran while they were on that date that never appeared in the extra chapter. These consisted of Sakura and Syaoran waving at each other while meeting at their rendezvous (similar to a panel from the extra chapter), Sakura comically tripping and Syaoran panicking and grabbing Sakura's arm to save her from falling, Sakura enjoying an ice cream and Syaoran getting himself one while smiling at her, and (back outside the Kinomoto home) a blushing Syaoran presenting a blushing Sakura with a bunch of handpicked flowers.
7	September 3, 2019	978-4-06-517074-8 (regular edition); 978-4-06-517075-5 (special edition)	April 21, 2020	978-1-63236-832-4
Chapters 30–34
Sakura begins to wonder if she is manifesting the situations that spawn the very cards she is creating. In a flashback, Yuna determines that Akiho is a blank canvas that can be impressed upon. Syaoran reveals to Sakura that he siphoned her Sakura Cards from her because her powers were growing far too strong and could lead her to a life of unhappiness. The cards manifest and tell Sakura they went along with Syaoran to help him protect Sakura. Since Eriol is unable to connect with Kero and Yue, he sends Ruby Moon and Spinel Sun to Tomoeda to assist them. Sakura is deeply sad at Syaoran's revelation, indirectly voicing her suspicion that his reason for coming back to Tomoeda was out of a sense of duty; not out of love and wanting to be with her. Taken aback, Syaoran tells Sakura that his mission was only part of his reason for returning; he just wanted to see her again as soon as possible. Happy and reassured, Sakura tells Syaoran she wishes she knew him when he was younger; regretting the memories they missed out on. He suddenly transforms into a toddler. Sakura secures a card, Rewind, that resembles Syaoran and reverts him back to his normal age. Before returning to normal, Syaoran assures Sakura that they have plenty of time to make new memories together, who smiles lovingly back at Syaoran and agrees. Yuna is waiting for Sakura to create a particular card. Syaoran attempts to tell Sakura some knowledge about her current predicament, but Kaito's magic prevents him from expressing himself. Cards secured: Blade, Repair, and Rewind. Note: A special edition of this volume was released in Japan that came with the first of two Drama CDs. This adapted several scenes from the earlier chapters of the manga and episodes of the anime, while also featuring new scenes such as a telephone conversation between Syaoran and Eriol.
8	April 1, 2020	978-4-06-517913-0 (regular edition); 978-4-06-517421-0 (special edition)	November 17, 2020	978-1-63236-906-2
Chapters 35–39
During a festival Sakura and Syaoran find that they are prevented from touching each other. Each time they try and touch they are burnt by a charge of electricity. Sakura thinks it's a Clear Card, but after a sealing incantation doesn't work, Syaoran believes it is the work of Yuna D. Kaito. Sakura confirms she is creating her own cards, but doesn't understand why. Cards secured: Shade and Break. Note: In Japan a special edition of this volume was released that came with the second of two Drama CDs. As with the first Drama CD, this adapted several scenes from the earlier chapters of the manga and episodes of the anime, while also featuring new scenes such as a conversation between Yamazaki and Syaoran where Yamazaki tells Syaoran about his romantic relationship with Chiharu and his love for her.
9	October 13, 2020	978-4-06-521033-8 (regular edition); 978-4-06-521142-7 (special edition)	July 13, 2021	978-1-64651-033-7
Chapters 40–44; Short Story
Yuna D. Kaito encounters Nadeshiko's spirit; learning about her past and regrets the fact that Akiho never grew up in a loving home like Sakura did. Yuna later encounters Syaoran, and they engage in battle, and Yuna reveals that he is waiting for Sakura to create the Clear Card he is waiting for. Yuna warns Syaoran that his motives will likely make Syaoran angry. When Sakura discovers them and confronts them, Yuna turns back time once more. Momo is revealed to be a guardian of a book regarding time magic. Cards secured: Transfer and Promise. Short Story Summary: While getting herself ready to make dinner with Kero and Spinel, Sakura looks at the bear she gave to Syaoran and picks it up smiling; remembering the time she revealed to Syaoran that she loves him and gave it to him. She wonders if the bear she exchanged with Syaoran (the one he originally gave Sakura) misses her. Holding her bear close to her face, Sakura expresses the hope that she, Syaoran and their two bears will all be together someday. Kero then calls Sakura, and having realized she forgot about the cooking, heads off to the kitchen. At that moment, Sakura's bear glows with magical energy. At the same time, back at his apartment, Syaoran has the funny feeling that someone is calling for him. Looking down at his phone, Syaoran picks it up and rings Sakura. Syaoran awkwardly tells Sakura that he didn't need anything; trying to say that he just wanted to talk to her. The two have a conversation (the details of which aren't shown), and Syaoran says to Sakura that he's happy he got to talk to her as well. Unknown to Syaoran, his bear also glows with magical energy, and an unknown voice says (above an image of the two glowing bears) that they hope they can all be together someday; just as Sakura did earlier. Note 1: Chapter 41, which is reprinted in this volume, features Syaoran's mother Yelan for the first time. Previously, she only appeared in the anime version. Yelan appears in future chapters, as well as in the "Until We Meet Again" bonus manga that was included in a special edition of Volume 10 in Japan (set during the time Syaoran and Sakura maintained a long-distance relationship while he was in Hong Kong). Note 2: In Chapter 43, which is reprinted in this volume, Sakura reflects on the time Yukito (in CCS Chapter 40) assured her that the person she loves most is still out there, and when she finds him, he will love her more than anyone. Sakura remembers the words Syaoran told her, but before he can say them Syaoran recites them ("Don't worry. I'll know you'll find them someday"). Sakura smiles lovingly back at Syaoran, saying that she did find that person (Syaoran). The official English translation translates this scene a bit differently (although the meaning is still the same), quoting Sakura as saying that Yukito told her her favorite person is still out there, and when she found him, he would be his favorite person in the world too. This differs both from the Dark Horse and Kodansha USA translations of CCS Chapter 40, which quoted Yukito as saying that the person she loves most is still out there, and when she finds him, he will love her more than anyone.
10	April 1, 2021	978-4-06-522870-8 (regular edition); 978-4-06-522869-2 (special edition)	October 5, 2021	978-1-64651-288-1
Chapters 45–49; Short Story 2; Until We Meet Again bonus story (Special edition only)
Sakura encounters the mysterious entity from her dreams at school and she combats them. She finds the entity to be Syaoran, but when the real Syaoran appears independently of it, Sakura secures the new cards "Mirage" and "Dreaming," and determines Syaoran must not be the robed figure. Syaoran tells Sakura thinks that her dreams may be a premonition of what is to come. Feeling guilty that he may have worried her, Syaoran confides in the cards who reassure him, while Light suggests to Syaoran that he invites her out on a date. Although Syaoran deeply loves Sakura and has been in a relationship with Sakura for a while now and has been dating her since his return to Tomoeda, he has never asked her out on a date due to his shy and nervous nature. Remembering where Sakura invited him on their first date, Syaoran thinks to himself that its his turn to ask Sakura out. He eventually does so after some prompting by Kero; leaving Syaoran embarrassed and Sakura in a joyful, happy mood; having been asked out by her boyfriend. Syaoran later talks happily to Sakura about their upcoming date, and both are embarrassed when they see their friends Yamazaki and Naoko giggling at them. Sakura and Akiho also continue to have shared dreams. At school, time stops for all except Sakura and Syaoran, and Syaoran's cards are suddenly pulled from him. Sakura uses Siege and Syaoran uses Windy to pull them back, recovering all except the Mirror Card. When Sakura and Akiho share a tender moment, a darkness within her manifests and Sakura's mother's watch stops time. Thinking Yuna stopped time, Momo animates and reviews the situation, only to be discovered by Sakura. Their cover blown, Momo determines what to do next. Cards secured: Mirage and Dreaming. Short Story 2 summary: After returning home from school, Akiho happily tells Kaito that Tomoyo has promised to teach her all about sewing; noting that she would like to start off making little mascot clothes for Momo and Sakura's "stuffed animals" (Kero and Spinel) before moving up to making proper clothes. Kaito asks Akiho if they're for her, but looking lovingly at Kaito she nearly reveals that she wants to make clothes for him but gets embarrassed before saying this. Akiho mentions to Kaito that Momo is the only stuffed animal she's ever had, having been denied other toys as a child, and Kaito notes that Momo is her special, beloved friend. Akiho leaves the room to make tea and cakes with Kaito, while Momo (whom Akiho is unaware is actually a living person in disguise) wonders when Kaito will realize that he has someone special of his own by his side. Until We Meet Again bonus story summary: After coming home from school, Sakura is delighted to find a letter from Syaoran, and is really happy to use her paper knife (which she bought for opening Syaoran's letters) to open it with. Back in Hong Kong, Syaoran looks at the sky deeply sad, missing Sakura. Noticing the way he looks, Syaoran's mother Yelan comments that he has a soulless expression. She tells Syaoran that she will be there for his training session that afternoon. Syaoran feels that he still hasn't trained enough. Yelan tells Syaoran that if there's something he wants to accomplish, then training his skills is important but he must also face his own heart; pointing out to Syaoran that he only decided to become stronger for the sake of the new owner of the Clow Cards. Syaoran said that he did, and Yelan tells Syaoran to follow the path he chose but at the same time must not take his eyes off his heart, because if he lies to himself he will make the person who loves him so dearly sad. Syaoran agrees, and Yelan promises to see him that afternoon. Alone, Syaoran says (as though to Sakura) that he hopes his letter will make her smile a little; smiling brightly as he says her name. Back in Japan, Sakura finishes reading Syaoran's long, four-page letter to her. Touched by his words (which are never revealed) Sakura says Syaoran's name and holds his letter against her chest (with romantic flower imagery in the background). Sakura is then startled by an outburst from Kero, who noted how Toya had just come home and was close to discovering Kero. He asks Sakura if the letter was good and (thinking of the clearly romantic content of the letter) says smiling lovingly that it was. Kero rubs her head, happy for her. Sakura then says she will start writing her response with some new stationary she bought, and says (thinking of Syaoran, with her eyes closed smiling) "Until We Meet Again." Note: The above story, which came in the form of a booklet, was only released in Japan with a special edition of Clear Card Volume 10. It is notable for being the first story in the franchise to focus on Sakura and Syaoran's long-distance relationship during the two years they were apart. The special edition also came with a single connected to the story called "Letters between the Stars;" a duet of Syaoran and Sakura reflecting on their love for each other.
11	October 13, 2021	978-4-06-524903-1 (regular edition); 978-4-06-524862-1 (special edition)	May 24, 2022	978-1-64651-439-7
Chapters 50–54; Short Story 3; Short Story 4
Momo reveals to Sakura her true form along with the fact that she is the guardian of Akiho's "Alice in Clockland" book; as Akiho wished. Kaito appears and turns back time once again; causing Sakura to forget what happened but she was left feeling the total opposite of happiness and creates a new card based on her mother's watch, without remembering making it. Momo asks Kaito to think about who it is he seeks the power he desires for. When Kaito looks after Akiho, who is recovering in bed, she notices that something is wrong but Kaito, who believes that his time is coming to an end, doesn't say anything. Sakura shares her concerns with Syaoran, who is worried about her tries touching her but then pulls away when he remembers the spell placed on them. He's sorry that he can't give Sakura any answers but she smiles happily at Syaoran, telling him that she's just happy that he's right here by her side. The two go on their date at the botanical garden, with Sakura telling Syaoran that she prefers going there than at a cinema as she feels it will give them more time to talk this way (Syaoran agrees; smiling lovingly back at his girlfriend). They are unexpectedly joined by Akiho and Kaito, who made him go with her to the garden in the hope of getting closer to Kaito. He places a spell on Syaoran; making him smile constantly and unable to say anything. When Sakura mentions to Syaoran that he looks like he's in pain, she unintentionally breaks Kaito's spell. Realizing this, Syaoran tries to tell Sakura about Kaito but he then freezes time. Momo is annoyed at Kaito for ruining Sakura and Syaoran's date. Kaito is impressed by Sakura's magical ability, and is shocked when she speaks to him; unaffected by his time spell. Card secured: Time. Short Story 3 summary: At the ice cream parlor where they're currently working, Yukito talks to Toya about them and Nakuru preparing noodles and inviting Sakura and Syaoran along; making Toya grumpy. Yukito smiles at this, reminding Toya that they both know Syaoran is like family to him now; making Toya grumpier. Changing the subject, Yukito tells Toya that he can also use magic; but knows that Toya was aware of this at the Tsukimine Shrine. Worried for the boy he loves, Toya tells Yukito not to get hurt, along with his other self, and Yukito smiles warmly at Toya's loving concern for him; promising that he will do his best. Note: Toya and Yukito's interactions in this chapter indicate that Toya and Yukito are now in a relationship, but its never made as clear as in the case of Sakura and Syaoran. During a CLAMP Twitter Space discussion in 2022, however, CLAMP member Satsuki Igarashi confirmed that Toya and Yukito are now a couple in Clear Card. Short Story 4 summary: While still recovering, Eriol studies some information he obtained on Kaito (which he managed to keep hidden until now due to his sorcery) while Mizuki checks up on him; concerned about his wellbeing. Eriol has an idea as to why Kaito is travelling with Akiho. He believes that Sakura is the one who can show Kaito what matters most, and says that he will need to be strong for Sakura, Akiho and their loved ones.
12	April 1, 2022	978-4-06-527161-2 (regular edition); 978-4-06-527162-9 (special edition)	October 18, 2022	978-1-64651-568-4
Chapters 55–59; Short Story 5
Kaito expresses his admiration for Sakura's abilities; noting how she was able to use her Siege magic to encase herself before his time magic came into effect, and is the firtt person to ever escape his spell. He reveals to Sakura that he knows about her magic abilities as well as those of Syaoran's, along with him being the future head of the Li clan. Sakura uses her Transfer card to encase Kaito in the same magical shield she's in. Despite this, Kaito is able to turn time to before Sakura and Syaoran met up for their date. Sensing something is wrong, Sakura calls Syaoran over to her house and they speak to each other inside the Siege shield. Sakura thinks that they still met up for their date that day, with Sakura remembering her using the Siege card along with the fact that Kaito can use magic. Syaoran reveals to Sakura that he knew this too but couldn't tell her because of the spell Kaito placed on him. Kero reveals that he, Spinel, Eriol and Yue also knew about Kaito's magic, but Yue felt it was better not to tell Sakura. Although they feel bad, Sakura knows they were only looking out for her. Syaoran figures out that Kaito can control time with magic. Momo, who is listening to this conversation, sees that Kaito has been caught out. Sakura also suspects that although Syaoran can't detect any magic inside Akiho, she thinks there's something inside Akiho as well but doesn't know what it is. Kero thinks that Sakura's growing power means she's the only person who can see it. Spinel, Ruby Moon, Kero and Yue later meet to discuss the situation, such as how they kept the secret of Kaito's magic from her, and note that Sakura's decisions are hers to make. Spinel notes that Syaoran thought it would be best if they honored Sakura's wishes this time. At the school, Naoko asks Sakura and Akiho (after seeing how close they are) if they will appear in the school play she is producing, "The Twin Alices." Both agree, while Syaoran agrees to participate as well; taking the role of a cat that is plays an integral part in the lives of both Alices. Kaito believes that he will be able to make Sakura produce the magic he needs when the play is performed. Naoko was inspired by a book Akiho owns called "Alice in Clockland," and Kero reveals to Sakura that it is a powerful spell book. Sakura encounters the hooded figure in her sleep, and suspects that they are Akiho, not Syaoran. Kero and Spinel discuss the powers of Akiho's book and receive an unexpected guest in the form of Momo, whom Spinel realizes is its guardian. Transforming into her human-like form, Momo prepares to leave them with something; hoping to do so before Kaito discovers their meeting and turns time back once again. Card secured: True or False. Short Story 5 summary: Returning home, Fujitaka finds Nadeshiko cradling their new born daughter Sakura; beaming when he sees their daughter smiling at him. Fujitaka says that he's sure she loves her mother as well. Stroking Nadeshiko's face, Fujitaka says that he thought she was an angel from Heaven when she came down from the sky, but worries if she were to go back to where she came from someday and leave him behind. Lost for words at first, Nadeshiko says that its sweet of him and that he means a lot to her as well. She's certain that Sakura and Toya will someday meet someone they hold dear like they did with each other, and choose the path that brings them happiness with their "special someone" (soulmate) no matter what happens to them in life. Nadeshiko suddenly has a vision of Sakura as a Middle Schooler telling her mother that she knows she and her brother Toya will be fine (given that at this point Sakura and Toya have each found their special someone; Sakura with Syaoran and Toya with Yukito). Nadeshiko is left stunned by the vision. Worried, Fujitaka wonders if Nadeshiko is alright, but she smiles and says that she's sure Sakura and Toya will be fine.
13	October 13, 2022	978-4-06-529235-8 (regular edition); 978-4-06-529243-3 (special edition)	April 25, 2023	978-1-64651-687-2
Chapters 60–65
While still dreaming, Sakura asks the hooded figure if they will meet in the real world, and they reply telling Sakura that when they do it will be "the beginning of the end." Kaito dreams about Akiho's mother Lillie; remembering the kindness she showed him together with their shared antipathy towards the groups they belonged to. Kaito was opposed to the Secret Society, telling Lillie how all they care about is extending their influence, while Lillie for her part opposed her clan's agenda; bringing all of the world's magic under their command. Kaito also remembers learning of Lillie's engagement and her happiness at finding love and something that is hers alone. Lillie hoped that Kaito would find something he likes and is his alone, and wished to help him find it. When he awakens, Akiho confides in Kaito about her parents; how they died in an accident protecting her, and how other members of the clan regretted Akiho's mother and father getting together given that they had a daughter with no magic at all. Kaito listens to all this sadly while reflecting on his regret over the indirect part he played in Akiho being turned into a tool by her clan; telling them that he couldn't detect any magic in her and that she was like a "blank book." Kaito believed that by telling them this they would expel Akiho from the clan and let her live a normal life, but they instead saw this as an opportunity to use her for their magical experiments; wreaking havoc on her health in the process. Kaito seeks to make amends to Lillie for what happened to her daughter. At Sakura's school, the long-awaited play (based on Akiho's favorite book) takes place, giving Kaito the chance to finally put the final stage of his plan into operation. Sakura plays a girl called Alice, Akiho the Red Queen (a mysterious ruler of a world called Clockland) and Syaoran a cat who guides Alice to this world. Syaoran partly takes the part to keep watch over Sakura. During the performance, Sakura and Akiho disappear through a magical portal on the stage; shocking Syaoran. Aware of what is going on, Yukito uses his newly developed magical ability; casting a night shadow over the school while Toya uses his own newly developed magical ability (which Toya briefly mentioned to Yukito in Volume 2); that of stopping time temporarily. Yukito's night shadow enables Toya's magic to last longer, giving Syaoran the chance to enter the portal and find Sakura. Watching the events, Kero accidentally reveals himself and Spinel to Toya, but Spinel realizes that Toya already knows about them. Sakura and Akiho find themselves in a fake world based on Clockland where they believe themselves to be the characters they are portraying. Syaoran realizes that this fake world was created by a powerful magical spell and finds himself moving from platform to platform as the scenery crumbles around him. Sakura encounters various people resembling avatars of the cards she created, while elsewhere Syaoran appears to find Sakura falling and rushes to save her; grabbing her hand. Unlike before, the "no-touch spell" doesn't shock them both; to Syaoran's surprise. The figure then reveals herself to be the Mirror card, whom Kaito recently stole from Sakura. In another part of Clockland Sakura comes across a fake Syaoran, who mounts a dragon with Sakura to take her to an unknown location. Cards obtained: Kindness, Choice and Synchronize.
14	March 31, 2023	978-4-06-531188-2 (regular edition); 978-4-06-531408-1 (special edition)	November 14, 2023	978-1-64651-886-9
Chapters 66–70
The fake Syaoran (Kaito in disguise) takes Sakura to the Red Queen's castle. Yelan reveals to Eriol that she placed the no-touch spell on Syaoran, having had a premonition that a time would come when her son would need to distinguish between a fake Sakura and the real Sakura. Eriol and Yelan are aware that Kaito used Mirror and wonder how he is always one step ahead of them. Kaho suspects that Kaito is able to turn back time so that events transpire in his favor. Yelan and Eriol know that if that's true then Kaito is reducing his life force by doing this. Yelan wonders what Kaito hopes to accomplish by putting his life at risk. Back in Clockland Syaoran finds himself on the edge of the world with himself and Mirror saved by Flight. Syaoran realizes that the no-touch spell placed on him has been broken, and that the spell was placed on him by his mother. Mirror tells Syaoran that Flight remembered her, adding that Flight loves their master very much and that Flight loves Syaoran too; aware of how much Sakura means to him. Touched at Flight's awareness of his deep love for Sakura, Syaoran pats Flight gently and thanks it. Mirror apologizes to Syaoran for tricking him into thinking she was Sakura, saying that she let Kaito use her, but Syaoran assures Mirror it wasn't her fault. Syaoran then realizes he no longer has the Sakura Cards, and Mirror explains that she is the only Sakura Card allowed in Clockland because Kaito brought her there. Sakura meets Akiho (who believes herself to be the Red Queen) and they journey together across various locations, including a library (reflecting Akiho's love of books). Both gradually remember who they really are, and Sakura's memories return when Syaoran calls out to Sakura. She tells Syaoran this, who smiles and says to Sakura that to him she will always be Sakura Kinomoto; no one else. Akiho's memories return upon seeing Kaito (no longer disguised as Syaoran) and faints soon afterwards. Sakura wonders if Akiho would've been stuck in Clockland forever if they never got out of the story, and Sakura tearfully wishes she had played the part of the Red Queen. The strength of Sakura's desire results in her creating a new card; the one that Kaito had been wishing for all this time, and uses its power. The scene changes back to the school, where Sakura is not only playing the Red Queen as she wished, but is now Akiho's sister. Using the new card, Kaito exchanged his own artifact for the one inside Akiho, with Akiho's book and all the sorceries transcribed now part of him. He tells Momo that with his own determination, together with the cards Sakura created, he was able to work the forbidden magic of the book of time Momo watches over. He notes that a man can write the events of a person's life in the book and change them with its forbidden magic. Kaito asked Momo to do this in regards to Sakura and Akiho; record their lives in the book and rewrite them so that they have been twin sisters since birth. Although Momo notes that by rewriting the past one creates paradoxes, she is glad that by doing this the secret society and the clan of sorcerers will no longer pursue Akiho, and that Sakura and her family will keep her safe. However, Momo knows that Kaito can not contain the vast sorceries inscribed upon Akiho's soul; something which he is aware of. When Kaito was entrusted with the task of escorting "the artifact" (Akiho), a binding spell called the "Seal of D" was placed on him in case he "misused the artifact;" Kaito having agreed to this. Back in the present, the binding spell takes effect on Kaito, who is nevertheless happy that he was able to use his magic on his own accord to help Akiho. Momo cries out in despair as he vanishes. At that moment, back at the school, Sakura senses that something has happened but is unsure what it could be. Card obtained: Exchange.
15	November 13, 2023	978-4-06-533132-3 (regular edition); 978-4-06-532203-1 (special edition)	September 24, 2024	979-8-88877-266-9
Chapters 71–75
In the rewritten world brought about by Kaito's use of the Exchange Card, Sakura is about to start her second year of Middle School while Akiho is now living with her. Both of them, along with Sakura's family and their friends, believe that they are twin sisters, with Akiho's absence explained that for years she was being cared for by Masaki due to her health problems but is now well enough to live with Sakura, Toya and Fujitaka. In addition, no one remembers Kaito. While alone with Syaoran, its revealed that Sakura has the Sakura Cards again, and she tells Syaoran that she hopes to tell Akiho about everything that has happened since she became a Cardcaptor, along with the people she has come to know. Smiling and blushing, Sakura tells Syaoran that she wants to tell Akiho about him as well; about the day he met, how he always comes to her rescue, and how he is "the most important person in her life" (the person she loves the most). The two gently hold hands and touch each other's foreheads. Sakura hopes that, like her, Akiho also has a partner. At that moment Sakura faints and finds herself in front of the hooded figure from her dreams; revealed to be none other than Akiho's mother Lilie from when she was a young girl. She explains to Sakura that she is able to see the future, and used her magic to travel to the present day and communicate to Sakura in her dreams. She explains that the reason why Sakura originally saw Syaoran as the hooded figure is because she was afraid, so she replaced Lilie in her mind with the person she loves most. She also reveals to Sakura that her memories have been rewritten. Sakura wakes up, and can't remember who she spoke to, but knows that she was told something important. Back at her house, Sakura tells Akiho about her adventures (which Akiho is excited to learn about), and notes that there is some important magic she prepared. Remembering the Record card, Sakura activates it. She previously had asked Record to reveal itself only after she called its name, and used it to record her observations of the strange events that had occurred since she started Middle School. Momo, for her part, left a message for Sakura. Unable to reveal Kaito's name as she is supposed to be neutral, she told Sakura in the message about how "the boy" will soon cast forbidden magic. All of Sakura's memories, apart from those about Kaito, return. Knowing what has happened, Sakura explains everything to Akiho and all those who know about Sakura's secret life as a Cardcaptor. She explains that their world has been rewritten but there is someone out there, someone special to Akiho, who is gone from both their world and the Record card's memories. Sakura thinks that this is not only the person who rewrote the world but was someone Akiho never wanted to lose. Akiho says that she is hurting, as she feels that there is someone out there she is searching for. Nakura excitedly volunteers to help, but Sakura feels that as they are searching for Akiho's most important person, it would be best if she went with her most important person; Syaoran. Using Flight and Fly (the latter of which Sakura has given to Syaoran), the two of them encounter a sorcerous imitation of the moon. Sakura destroys it with her Sword card; revealing a portal. Sakura and Syaoran enter the portal and find themselves in a world filled with clockwork and come across a Kaito in his dragon form; trapped inside a magical prison.
16	April 1, 2024	978-4-06-534999-1 (regular edition); 978-4-06-534855-0 (special edition)	March 11, 2025	979-8-88877-373-4
Chapters 76–80; Special Chapter
Having located Kaito, Sakura and Syaoran confront the magic defences surrounding the magical prison around him. After a long battle, Syaoran and Sakura (who are helped by Akiho and their friends) succeed in freeing Kaito while also remembering who he is. However, Sakura uses magic to both reverse time and make everyone but a few people forgot all about Akiho and Kaito (including Akiho's clan and Kaito's society); in the process enabling them to live a normal and peaceful life. The Sakura cards also obtain characteristics from the Clear Cards, all of which (apart from Flight) become one with Momo's magic book. After Kaito's return, Akiho reveals to Sakura her true name to be Cosmo, while Kaito reveals to Akiho that his true name is Cristaux. It is also revealed that time has stopped for Kaito, and Akiho and Kaito decide to leave Japan to find a cure for him somewhere, but not before Kaito provides Syaoran with his contact details and promising to teach Syaoran time magic; knowing that he isn't the kind of person who would use such magic for the wrong reasons. Back in her room, Sakura reflects on things and looks at the key containing her Star Wand; wondering if it will one day go to the person it chooses to be with. Card obtained: Exchange. Special Chapter summary: Time has passed since Akiho and Kaito left Japan and have now moved to Germany. Sakura and Syaoran hear regularly from them, and are currently on their summer break and soon to begin their final year of Junior High School. Akiho also sends rare books to Eriol which she comes across, while Tomoyo has devoted herself to making everyday and dating clothes for Sakura and tells Sakura that she needs to be ready for the day when she crafts Sakura's wedding dress (for the day she marries Syaoran); a statement that leaves Sakura blushing while on a date with Syaoran (she shakes her head, embarrassed, when a worried Syaoran enquires about her red face). Kaito indirectly reveals to Akiho that he loves her back, but changes the subject when she misunderstands what he says. Sakura is visited one day by Momo, who is no longer with Kaito and Akiho, and thanks Sakura for being there for them both. Sakura tells Momo that Akiho is searching for her, but assures Sakura that Akiho will one day find her. One morning, when meeting up with Syaoran to walk to school with her, he presents Sakura with a gift; looking lovingly at Sakura and mentioning that it is her birthday: the most special day for him. Sakura responds by holding Syaoran's hand close to where her heart is and, looking lovingly at Syaoran, tells him that he will always be the most special to her before giving him a big hug. Note 1: Sakura's comment about her Star Wand is likely a reference to Chapter 224 of Tsubasa: Reservoir Chronicle, in which Sakura magically appears to Clone Sakura (one of her counterparts in the Tsubasa universe) in a dream and gives her the Star Wand. Clone Sakura recounts this meeting with her husband Clone Syaoran; Syaoran's counterpart in that universe. Note 2: Sakura's actual age in the special chapter, which this scene takes place in, is not stated, although due to the fact that Sakura is about to start her final year of junior high school it is likely that she turns fourteen in this chapter. Sakura's narrative dialogue in this chapter, with her noting that she will soon be starting her final year of Junior High School, strongly suggests that a future Cardcaptor Sakura series will take place during her and Syaoran's time in Senior High School.
