= Universal love =

Universal love may refer to:

- Universal Love, a 1975 album by MFSB
- Universal Love – Wedding Songs Reimagined, a 2018 album of same-sex wedding songs by various artists
- Universalove, a 2008 Austrian romantic tragedy film

== See also ==
- Agape, a Greco-Christian term referring to love, "the highest form of love, charity" and "the love of God for man and of man for God"
- Charity (virtue), a virtue in Christianity
- Love, a feeling of strong attraction and emotional attachment to a person, animal, or thing
- Mohism, an ancient Chinese philosophy
- Moral universalism, the meta-ethical position that some system of ethics, or a universal ethic, applies universally, that is, for "all similarly situated individuals", regardless of culture, disability, race, sex, religion, nationality, sexual orientation, gender identity, or any other distinguishing feature
- Omnibenevolence, unlimited or infinite benevolence
- Unconditional love, love without judgment
- Universal value, the same value or worth for all, or almost all, people
- Universalism, the philosophical and theological concept within Christianity that some ideas have universal application or applicability
