= Editora JBC =

Brazilian publishing company

Editora JBC (also known as "JBC") is a company that publishes books (including manga) and magazines related to Japan in Brazil. It has its headquarters in São Paulo.

This company was established in Tokyo, Japan, in 1992 to publish Portuguese newspapers for Brazilians who live in Japan. And it came to publish books and magazines related to Japan also in Brazil. Now this publisher is also known as a manga publisher in Brazil. Since 2006, the company supports the World Cosplay Summit (WCS), an annual international cosplay event, and hosts the preliminary rounds in Brazil.

JBC is more well known in Brazil than in Japan, although it is a Japanese company.

== Name ==
The meaning of the name JBC of the company is Japan Brazil Communication.

The formal name of the company is JB Communication ("JBC出版社" in Japan), the name of the branch office in Brazil is JB Communication do Brasil Ltda. In the publication, being described only as JBC is usual.

== Publication ==
=== In Japan ===
- Tudo Bem - The newspaper written in Portuguese for the Brazilians in Japan. Started in 1993.
- Gambare! - The free magazine written in Portuguese for the Brazilians in Japan. Started in September 2005.

=== In Brazil ===
- Made in Japan - The monthly magazine that introduces various things of Japan. Started in September 1997.

And JBC publishes manga and books related to Japan only in Brazil.

== Manga ==

This company entered the publication of manga in 2001 with Samurai X (Rurouni Kenshin). JBC is generally known as a publisher of manga and the second biggest manga publisher in Brazil now. The manga of these Portuguese editions is sold only in Brazil.

The catchphrase is "Mangá é a nossa língua!" (Manga is our language!).

=== Manga published by JBC in Portuguese in Brazil ===
==== 2001 ====
Released month	Title	Author	Brazil	Volumes	Original Country	Volumes
May	Rurouni Kenshin ("Samurai X", in Brazil)	Nobuhiro Watsuki	Finished	56 (half-tanko)	Finished	28
May	Cardcaptor Sakura ("Sakura Card Captors", in Brazil)	CLAMP	Finished	24 (half-tanko)	Finished	12
June	Video Girl Ai	Masakazu Katsura	Finished	30 (half-tanko)	Finished	15
July	Magic Knight Rayearth ("Guerreiras Mágicas de Rayearth", in Brazil)	CLAMP	Finished	12 (half-tanko)	Finished	6

==== 2002 ====
Released month	Title	Author	Brazil	Volumes	Original Country	Volumes
May	Love Hina	Ken Akamatsu	Finished	28 (half-tanko)	Finished	14
August	InuYasha ("Inu-Yasha", in Brazil)	Rumiko Takahashi	Finished	112 (half-tanko)	Finished	56
September	Princess Knight ("A Princesa e o Cavaleiro", in Brazil)	Osamu Tezuka	Finished	8 (half-tanko)	Finished	4
November	Yu Yu Hakusho	Yoshihiro Togashi	Finished	38 (half-tanko)	Finished	19
--	Star Wars	Hisao Tamaki ("Uma Nova Esperança"); Toshiki Kudo ("O Império Contra-Ataca"); Shin-Ichi Hiromoto ("O Retorno de Jedi"); Kia Asamiya ("A Ameaça Fantasma"); Adam Warren (Cover art, except "A Ameaça Fantasma")	Finished	14 (half-tanko)	Finished	7

==== 2003 ====
Released month	Title	Author	Brazil	Volumes	Original Country	Volumes
May	Battle Angel Alita ("Gunnm", in Brazil and the Japanese versions)	Yukito Kishiro	Finished	18 (half-tanko)	Finished	9
July	Shaman King	Hiroyuki Takei	Finished	64 (half-tanko)	Finished	32
August	Chobits	CLAMP	Finished	16 (half-tanko)	Finished	8
November	Love Junkies *R18	Kyo Hatsuki	Finished	52 (half-tanko)	Finished	26
December	X	CLAMP	Reached	18	Hiatus	18

==== 2004 ====
Released month	Title	Author	Brazil	Volumes	Original Country	Volumes
June	Cowboy Bebop	Yutaka Nanten	Finished	6 (half-tanko)	Finished	3
July	Yahiko's Reversed-Edge Sword ("Samurai X - A Sabakatou de Yahiko", in Brazil)	Nobuhiro Watsuki	Finished	1	Finished	1
August	Bastard!! *R18	Kazushi Hagiwara	Reached	27	Hiatus	27
November	Rurouni Kenshin - Kenshin Kaden ("Samurai X - Kenshin Kaden", in Brazil)	Nobuhiro Watsuki	Finished	1	Finished	1

==== 2005 ====
Released month	Title	Author	Brazil	Volumes	Original Country	Volumes
April	Fruits Basket	Natsuki Takaya	Finished	23	Finished	23
March	B't X	Masami Kurumada	Finished	16	Finished	16
June	Please Teacher! ("Onegai Teacher", in Brazil and the Japanese versions)	Shizuru Hayashiya (Story & Art); Please! Studios (Story)	Finished	2	Finished	2
June	Tokyo Babylon	CLAMP	Finished	7	Finished	7
August	Mouse	Satoru Akahori (Story); Hiroshi Itaba (Art)	Finished	14	Finished	14
October	Angelic Layer	CLAMP	Finished	5	Finished	5

==== 2006 ====
Released month	Obra	Author	Brazil	Volumes	Original Country	Volumes
January	Negima! ("Negima! - Magister Negi Magi", in Brazil)	Ken Akamatsu	Finished	76 (half-tanko)	Finished	38
March	×××HOLiC	CLAMP	Finished	38 (half-tanko)	Finished	19
April	Tsubasa: RESERVoir CHRoNiCLE	CLAMP	Finished	56 (half-tanko)	Finished	28
July	Yu-Gi-Oh!	Kazuki Takahashi	Finished	38	Finished	38
August	El-Hazard	Hidetomo Tsubura	Finished	6 (half-tanko)	Finished	3
August	.hack//Legend of the Twilight (".Hack//A Lenda do Bracelete do Crepúsculo", in Brazil)	Rei Idumi (Art); Tatsuya Hamazaki (Story)	Finished	7 (half-tanko)	Finished	3
October	Rurouni Kenshin (Novel) ("Samurai X - Crônicas de um Samurai na Era Meiji", in Brazil)	Nobuhiro Watsuki	Finished	2	Finished	2 (Novel)

2007

- Jan. Fullmetal Alchemist
- Apr. Samurai Girl
- May. Inu-Neko *R18
- Jun. Gravitation
- Jun. Death Note
- Sep. Saint Seiya: The Lost Canvas ("Os Cavaleiros do Zodiaco - The Lost Canvas: A Saga de Hades" in Brazil)
- Sep. Socrates in Love

2008

- Jan. Hunter × Hunter
- May. Revolutionary Girl Utena
- Jun. Please Twins! ("Onegai Twins" in Brazil and the Japanese versions)
- Jul. Nana
- Jul. Hellsing

2009

- Jan. Tenjho Tenge
- Feb. Futari Ecchi
- May. Full Moon o Sagashite
- Jul. Dna²
- Sep. Ranma ½

2010

- Jan. Hikaru no Go
- Jan. Golgo 13
- Mar. Blue Dragon - Ral Ω Grad
- Apr. D•N•Angel
- Jun. Miyuki-chan in Wonderland ("Miyuki-chan no País das Maravilhas" in Brazil)
- Jul. Rosario+Vampire
- Jul. Blue Dragon: Secret Trick
- Jul. Buso Renkin
- Ago. MÄR
- Ago. Town of Evening Calm, Country of Cherry Blossoms ("Hiroshima - a Cidade da Calmaria " in Brazil)
- Set. Monster Hunter Orage
- Set. Neon Genesis Evangelion
- Oct. Fairy Tail

2011

- Jan. Code Geass: Lelouch of the Rebellion ("Code Geass - A rebelião de Lelouch" in Brazil)
- Feb. Summer Wars
- Mar. Ga-rei
- Apr. Saber Marionette J
- Jul. Death Note - Another Note
- Ago. Bakuman
- Set. Saint Seiya: Next Dimension
- Set. Code Geass: Suzaku of the Counterattack ("Code Geass - O Contra-ataque de Suzaku" in Brazil)
- Set. Death Note - L Change the World
- Oct. Neon Genesis Evangelion - Tankōbon Version
- Oct. Rosario + Vampire: Season II
- Nov. Kobato
- Nov. Code Geass: Nightmare of Nunnally ("Code Geass - O Pesadelo de Nunnally" in Brazil)

2012

- Jan. Saint Seiya - Tankōbon Version
- Mar. Hero Tales
- Jun. Freezing
- Jun. Cardcaptor Sakura - Tankōbon Version ("Sakura Card Captors" in Brazil )
- Jul. Soul Eater
- Ago. Saint Seiya: The Lost Canvas – Anecdotes ("Os Cavaleiros do Zodíaco - The Lost Canvas: Gaiden" in Brazil)
- Set. Mashima-En
- Oct. RG Veda
- Oct. Nurarihyon no Mago ("Nura-A Ascensão do Clã das Sombras" in Brazil)
- Nov. Rurouni Kenshin - Tankōbon Version

2013

- Jan. Future Diary ("Diário do Futuro" in Brazil)
- Feb. Burn-Up: Excess & W
- Feb. Another
- Mar. Level E
- Apr. Love Hina
- May. The Innocent
- Jun. Death Note - Black Edition
- Jun. Genshiken
- Jun. King of Thorn ("Senhor dos Espinhos" in Brazil)
- Jul. Blue Exorcist
- Ago. Thermae Romae
- Oct. Inazuma Eleven ("Super Onze" in Brazil)
- Oct. Magic Knight Rayearth ("Guerreiras mágicas de Rayearth" in Brazil) - Tankōbon Version
- Dec. Ōsama Game ("Jogo do rei" in Brazil)
- Dec. Manga of the dead

2014

- Feb. Btooom!
- Mar. Future Diary - Mosaic ("Diário do Futuro: Mosaic" in Brazil)
- Apr. Future Diary - Paradox ("Diário do Futuro: Paradox" in Brazil)
- Apr. Sailor Moon
- May. Yokokuhan ("Prophecy" in Brazil)
- Jun. The Lucifer and Biscuit Hammer ("Lúcifer e o martelo" in Brazil)
- Jul. Tsumitsuki ("Tsumitsuki - Espírito da culpa" in Brazil)
- Jul. Magi: The Labyrinth of Magic ("Magi: O labirinto da magia" in Brazil)
- Sep. Doubt
- Sep. Hoshi Mamoru Inu ("O cão que guarda as estrelas" in Brazil)
- Oct. Chikyuu no Houkago ("After School of the Earth" in Brazil)
- Oct. Tom Sawyer
- Oct. YuYu Hakusho - Tankōbon Version
- Nov. Calling You ("Só você pode ouvir" in Brazil)
- Nov. Soul Eater Not!
- Dec. All You Need Is Kill

2015

- Jan. Green Blood
- Fev. Kizu ("Feridas" in Brazil)
- Fev. Blast of Tempest ("Zetsuen no Tempest ~ O Destruidor da Civilização ~" in Brazil)
- Fev. Jigokuren: Love in the Hell ("Love in the Hell" in Brazil)
- Fev. Ageha ("Ageha - Efeito Borboleta" in Brazil)
- Mar. The Seven Deadly Sins ("The Seven Deadly Sins" in Brazil)
- Apr. Enigma (Announced)
- Apr. Steins;Gate (Announced)
- Apr. Sailor Moon - Short Stories (Announced)
- Apr. Eien no Zero ("Zero Eterno" in Brazil) (Announced)
- May. Chobits - Tankōbon Version (Announced)
- Jun. Codename: Sailor V (Announced)
- Wish (Announced)
- Vitamin (Announced)
- Ghost in the Shell (Announced)
- Eden: It's an Endless World! (Announced)
- Terra Formars (Announced)
- Kill la Kill (Announced) ("Ink" Stamp)
- Another (novel) (Announced)
- Zoku Hoshi Mamoru Inu (Announced)
- Zetman (Announced)
- Dec. Akira (Announced)
