= Kotono =

- Gender: Female

Origin
- Origin: Japanese
- Meaning: Different meanings depending on the kanji used

Kotono (written 琴乃) is a feminine Japanese given name. Notable people with the name include:

- Kotono Mitsuishi (三石 琴乃; born 1967), Japanese voice actress and narrator
- Kotono Shibuya (渋谷 琴乃; born 1975), Japanese actress and singer
- Kotono Shirai (白井琴望; born 2002), Japanese actress and disc jockey and former member idol group SKE48
- Kotono Tanaka (田中 琴乃; born 1991), Japanese rhythmic gymnast

== Fictional characters ==
- Kotono Hayama in Saint October
- Kotono in Tuff E Nuff (Dead Dance)
