= Shichisei Tōshin Guyferd =

- Genre: Tokusatsu; Science fiction Martial arts
- Created by: Toho; Capcom
- Written by: Kazuhiro Inaba; Hiroshi Ishii
- Directed by: Hirochika Muraishi
- Starring: Hiroyuki Kawai; Asuka Shimizu; Yamato Tategawa; Shoichiro Akaboshi
- Narrated by: Masaaki Okabe
- Opening theme: "Towa no Chikai" by Kenzo Fukuyama
- Ending theme: “Befriend” by Kotono Shibuya
- Country of origin: Japan
- Original language: Japanese
- No. of episodes: 26

Production
- Running time: 24-25 min. (per episode)
- Production companies: Toho Company; Capcom

Original release
- Network: TV Tokyo
- Release: April 8 – September 28, 1996

Shichisei Tōshin Guyferd (七星闘神ガイファード, Shichisei Tōshin Gaifādo; "Seven-star Fighting God Guyferd") is a Tokusatsu series made by Toho and Capcom and aired on TV Tokyo in 1996. Guyferd borrows aspects from Kamen Rider, Bio Booster Armor Guyver and Fist of the North Star.

== Plot ==
After the mysterious disappearance of his older brother Masato, Gou Kazama returned to Japan from his travels, determined to find him. He soon discovered that Masato had been abducted by the Criminal Global Syndicate “Crown”, who had hopes to create the ‘ultimate fighter’, kidnapping the world’s strongest and most skilled martial artists to use in their inhuman experiments. Gou was eventually abducted by Crown and modified into a Guyborg, and during an escape he became a new entity via unknown means known as Guyferd. Using the style of the Ken'nou-ryu martial arts with his newfound power, Gou fights Crown while continuing the search for his brother.

== Characters ==
- Gou Kazama/Guyferd (風間剛／ガイファード, Kazama Gō/Gaifādo): The protagonist of the series. He has studied the Ken'nou-ryu branch of karate with his elder brother Masato, who he was looking for when he returned to Japan from his journey aboard. Gou's transformation into Guyferd is the result of being converted into a Guyborg by Crown, no one aware at the time that Gou ended up in a symbiosis with a Fallah during his travels in Peru prior to the series. This results in Gou possessing the body of a Guyborg with the parasitic Fallah empowering him, Crown attempting to capture him before learning to replicate his physiology in their Metalferds. While he intended to find his brother, Gou resolves to fight Crown to stop their agenda. As the Ken'nou-ryu style utilizes the five elemental “energies” (Fire, Water, Earth, Nature and Metal) and the two ethereal energies (Air and Star) which he uses to draw strength for his transformation, Guyferd uses seven unique attacks known as the Shichiseiha (七星波, Seven Star Waves).
  - Kyokuseiken (極星拳, Ultimate Star Fist): Utilizing Star energy, Guyferd can deliver this powerful move as his final attack.
  - Rekkageki (烈火撃, Blazing Hit): Utilizing Fire energy, Guyferd rapidly punches his opponent before using a smashing blow with his right fist.
  - Jiraishin (地雷震, Landmine Shock): Utilizing Earth energy, Guyferd deliver a crushing kick upside the head at blinding speed.
  - Fukaranbu (風花乱舞, Air Flower Dance): Utilizing Natural energy, Guyferd repeatedly execute a drop kick attack on his opponent.
  - Bakuraiha (爆雷波, Depthcharge Attack): Utilizing Metal energy, Guyferd uses the air currents to deliver a flying drop kick against his opponents.
  - Saigekishu (碎撃蹴, Smashing Hit Kick): Utilizing Water energy, Guyferd uses a drop kick to severely wound an opponent.
  - Gekiryusho (撃竜衝, Thrusting Dragon Attack): Utilizing Aerial energy, Guyferd delivers a destructive ‘cross’ karate chop attack.
  - Renki Kyokuseiken (連気極星拳, Combined Energy Ultimate Star Fist): Used in the final episode of the series. A powerful attack resulting from the combination of Guyferd's and Deathferd's Kyokuseikens.
- Takeo Shiroishi (城石丈雄, Shiroishi Takeo): Nicknamed the "Doctor", he was formerly a scientist at Crown researching the Fallah parasite for medical purposes. However, his ideals and morals were not acceptable and thus was fired. He escaped Crown with Gou, who he now lives with and aids him anyway he can.
- Rei Kujou (九條麗, Kujō Rei): A rich girl Gou had feelings for. She and her brother studied Ken'nou-ryu with Masato prior to his disappearance. They support Gou in any way they can. She uses the Power Accelator Boots to fight designed by Shiroishi, which supposedly enhances the user's strength by up to 30 times.
- Yuu Kujou (九條優, Kujō Yū): Rei's kid brother, and a whiz when it comes to computer hacking. Uses the Power Accelator Gloves to fight.
- Detective Yuji Nakano (刑事中野祐二, Keiji Nakano Yuji): One of few to believe in Crown's existence, despite being called crazy by his peers.

=== Crown ===
- Zodiac (ゾディアック, Zodiakku; 8-26): The ruler of Crown, he was a scientist who discovered the Fallah symbiote in South America and intended to use it to evolve humanity, developing a god complex and ideology based on natural selection. To achieve that goal, he had Crown unearth the Ancient Scientific Citadel called “Gaia Net”, intending to use its ancient technology to cause cataclysmic disasters around the world thus heralding the mass worldwide infestation of Fallah.
- Metal Master (メタルマスター, Metaru Masutā; 9-16): Zodiac's skull-faced right hand man, he takes over Crown operations after Mr. Bicross is killed.
- Megumi Shion (紫苑恵, Shion Megumi; 1-15): A scientist who took Shiroishi's place in Fallah research, using her Mutians to capture Gou to research his anatomy to perfect the ultimate soldier project. But once it became possible to infuse a Guyborg with a Fallah, her mission changes to eliminate Gou. While investigating Bicross' damaged chest armor, she is contacted by Zodiac who offers her a new place in his new world order. Accepting his offer, she kills the Crown staff and sets the Crown base to explode before sicking Deathferd on Gou while attempting to escape. However, she is pursued by Shiroishi and their fight over the Fallah data ends with her losing her footing and falling off a cliff. But Shion is found by Metal Master and underwent Guyborg modification to rebuild her shattered near-death body, becoming the Guyborg Metal Shion. Armed with a rapier while wearing a cloak and fedora to conceal her cybernetic body, Shion vows a vendetta on Gou for her current condition despite the irony that she robbed people of their humanity in her Fallah experiments. Though ordered to bring Gou before Zodiac to have him join Crown, Shion expected it not to happen and Shion kidnaps Rei to get Gou to come to her so she can kill him, wounding the girl in the process.
- Mr. Bicross (ミスターバイクロス, Misutā Baikurosu; 1-8): The mysterious crime lord who serves as the front-man for Crown operations. A gifted master of the Byakko-style martial arts, he served Zodiac by creating the ideal super soldier to carry out Crown's objective. However, when his plan to create Mutians out of the J-Force was ruined by Gou, Bicross decides to fight him personally by becoming a white-tiger Mutian, only to be wounded as a result. After recuperating, Bicross battles Gou when he arrives at his base of operations only to be killed by Guyferd's Gekiryusho.
- Minoh (箕面, Minō; 1-8): A scientist who works as a researcher for Crown's Guyborg research. He's in rivalry with Shion as she took his place as Crown's top scientist and belittled him. In the end, he is shot to death by Shion when she rigs the base with explosives.
- Masato Kazama/Deathferd (風間将人/デスファード, Kazama Masato/Desufādo; 1-6 (flashback), 7-8, 23-26): Gou's older brother, he practiced the Ken'nou-ryu fighting style. Sometime after Gou left, Masato was kidnapped by Crown and became a Guyborg, eventually used in an experiment to perfect the Guyborg/Fallah symbiosis, becoming Deathferd while realizing his grudge again Gou. He covers Bicross' escape before reuniting with Gou under false pretences. But at once the Crown Base, Masato reveals the truth before Shion forces him into becoming Deathferd. Though reluctant to, Gou is forced to fight his brother, both equal before Masato runs back into the Crown Base to die in it as it explodes. However, Deathferd served as the basis for the Metalferds. Masato returns in the final arc of the series, having survived the explosion and gaining full control of his transformation. Together, he and Gou defeat Zodiac and prevent the destruction of humanity.
- Fangs (ファング, Fangu; 3-26): Mass-produced Guyborgs created by Minoh, they act as Crown's henchmen.

==== Mutian ====
Parasitized with the Fallah, these humans would evolve into possessing enhanced immunity and stronger Qi. However, they would irreversibly mutate into inhuman fighters with monstrous abilities called Mutians (ミューテイン, Myutian).

- Jarks (ジークス, Jaakusu; 1): Formerly Taki, who took over Masato's place in the Ken'nou-ryu Dojo. A violent man, Taki was easily defeated by Gou. He was kidnapped and was turned into a hairy beast that destroyed Crown's lab in a fit of rage. But even as a Mutian, Jarks was bent on killing Gou. The resulting fight caused Gou to become Guyferd for the first time. He is destroyed by Kyokuseiken.
- Dogross (ドグロス, Dogurosu; 2): A cobra Mutian that uses the "Dogross Punch" attack. Because the Mutian project was incomplete, Dogross had to be drugged on a regular basis to work. But when the effects wore off after killing the escaping M17, Mr. Bicross orders Shion to allow Minoh to implant a chip in Dogross' brain in order to make him a loyal killing machine. But the chip malfunctions while sent after Gou, with Dogross's chip re-modified before being sent after the Kujou siblings to bring Gou into the open. He is destroyed by Guyferd's Rekkageki attack.
- Volgis (ボルキス, Borugisu; 3): A sea slug-themed Mutian sent by Shion after Gou, he uses electric whips that extend from his forearms to shock his enemies. After accidentally knocking Gou over the dam, Volgis was ordered to plant the Arclight Bombs across the dam to blow both it and the mountain up in hopes of finding Gou, capturing Rei and Shiroishi. As Yuu and the Ken'nou-ryu students free Rei and Shiroishi, Gou finally manages to transform into Guyferd at will and defeat Volgis after Shiroishi defuses the explosives.
- Spirass (スパイラス, Supairasu; 4): A female tarantula Mutian who uses a grappling fighting style and performs the "Spiral Beam" and "Spiral Net" attacks. She was sent to abduct a school bus Yuu was on while he and his classmates were making their way home after a swimming lesson, bringing the occupants to an isolated laboratory to be used in Crown's Fallah experimentation. Following Spiras' trail of residual Qi, Gou and company make their way to the laboratory as Yuu manages to free his classmates. Leaving her guinea pigs escape, Shion sics Spiras on Gou with orders to kill him as his dead body is good enough for experimentation. However, she ended up destroyed by Guyverd's Jiraishin attack, forcing the evacuation of the laboratory.
- Antares (アンタレス, Antaresu; 5): A scorpion-like Mutian whose fighting-style emulates the animal's armored body and deadly nature. After killing a fugitive Guyborg after he was infused with Fallah, Antares was sent by Shion to eliminate Guyferd with Guyborg 801 to immobilize him while in human form. Having 801 pose as a Crown fugitive, Gou falls for Shion's trap with Antares about to deliver the deathblow when Rei intervenes. Gou changes into Guyferd and fights the Mutian after he accidentally killed his Guyborg lackey, killing Antares with his Fukaranbu attack.
- Gilpulse (ギルパルス, Giruparusu; 6): A vampire bat Mutian who uses a Muay Thai fighting style and the sound waves that he emits to turn his victims into insane maniacs that would harm themselves and others. He targets Gou, only to learn that his Bloodlust Soundwave has no effect as the Mutian is forced to retreat. As a result, Gilpulse is ordered to target those dear to Gou with his sound waves. After his group is knocked out, Gou battles Gilpulse as Guyferd. But with Detective Nakano's interference, Guyferd manages to clip the weakened Gilpulse's wings and kill him with Kyokuseiken.

==== Metalferd ====
The Metalferds (メタルファード, Metarufādo) are Guyborgs infected with the Fallah parasite. Being as powerful as Guyferd due to the bio-mechanism of the Guyborg body & Fallah's "empowering" ability, making the Metalferds superior to Mutians. After the Daruga Tablet ended up in Crown's possession, some of the Metalferds are infused with its energies and evolve into more powerful beings known as Gaia Soldiers (ガイア・ソルジャー, Gaiasorujā).

- Dragos (ドラゴス, Doragosu; 9-10): The first of the Metalferds, the dragon-themed Metalferd uses a kung-fu fighting style with nun-chucks, his signature move Meidou Wave. Though he overpowered Guyferd, he stopped at Zodiac's command. Dragos later oversees the transporting of the Fallah from Warehouse 2 while siccing the Fangs on Nakano and Shiroshi when Gou arrive to their aid. Once assuming his fighting form, Guyferd disarms Dragos and kills him with his Rekkageki/Kyokuseiken combo.
- Batrod (バトロット, Batoroddo; 11)
- Baiken (バイケン, Baiken; 12)
- Globe (グローブ, Gurōbu; 14)
- Rudra (ルドラ, Rudora; 18): A Gaia Soldier Metalferd that was originally Dragos before he absorbed the energies of the Daruga Tablet.
- Scarabeth (スカラベス, Sukarabesu; 19): A Gaia Soldier Metalferd.
- Valkyrie (ワルキューレ, Warukyūre; 20): A Gaia Soldier Metalferd.
- Minos (ミノス, Minosu; 21): A Gaia Soldier Metalferd.
- Django (ジャンゴ, Jango; 22-23): A Gaia Soldier Metalferd.
- Ranghoul (ラングール, Rangūru; 24): A Gaia Soldier Metalferd.
- Valcanon (ヴァルカノン, Varukanon; 25): A Gaia Soldier Metalferd.

== Episodes ==
1. The Birth of Guyferd! (ガイファード誕生!, Gaifādo Tanjō!)
2. Gou in Danger! (あやうし! 剛, Ayaushi! Go)
3. Have You Seen the Ultimate Hyper-transformation? (見たか! 究極の超変身, Mita ka! Kyūkyoku no Chō Henshin)
4. Escape from the Genetic Laboratory (脱出! 遺伝子研究所, Dasshutsu! Idenshi Kenkyūjo)
5. Operation Battle Killer (バトルキラー計画, Batoru Kirā Keikaku)
6. Blood-thirst! Homicidal Sound Waves (殺気! 殺人音波, Sakki! Satsujin Onpa)
7. Crown's Strongest Warrior (クラウン最強の戦士, Kuraun Saikyō no Senshi)
8. Confrontation of Destiny! (宿命の対決!, Shukumei no Taiketsu!)
9. Crown's Ambition! (クラウンの野望!, Kuraun no Yabō!)
10. Defeat Metalferd (倒せメタルファード, Taose Metarufādo)
11. Brainjack (ブレインジャック, Bureinjakku)
12. Charge! Battlekids (突撃! バトルキッズ, Totsugeki! Batorukizzu)
13. Assassination Command GX-9 (暗殺指令GX-9, Ansatsu Shirei Gī Ekkusu Kyū)
14. To Protect a Small Life (守れ! 小さな命, Mamore! Chīsana Inochi)
15. The Red Rose of Revenge (復讐の赤いバラ, Fukushū no Akai Bara)
16. Countdown! (カウントダウン!, Kauntodaun!)
17. Zodiac's Appearance! (ゾディアック登場!, Zodiakku Tōjō!)
18. Release Gaia-Net! (ガイアネット解放!, Gaianetto Kaihoō!)
19. The Mystery of the Polaris Document (北辰文書のなぞ, Hokushin Bunsho no Nazo)
20. The Valkyrie's Trap (ワルキューレの罠, Warukyūre no Wana)
21. Pursue the Heptastral Sword! (七星剣を追え!, Shichiseiken o Oe!)
22. Guyferd Dies! (ガイファード死す!, Gaifādo Shisu!)
23. Resurrection! (復活!, Fukkatsu!)
24. The Warrior of Darkness Lives Again (よみがえる闇の戦士, Yomigaeru Kura no Senshi)
25. Earth's Last Day (地球最後の日, Chikyū Saigo no Hi)
26. Eternal Vow (永遠の誓い, Eien no Chikai)

== Cast ==
- Narrator: Masaaki Okabe
- Gou Kazama/Guyferd: Hiroyuki Kawai (voice)
  - Guyferd: Seiji Mori
- Rei Kujo: Asuka Shimizu
- Yuu Kujo: Yamato Tategawa
- Takeo Shiroishi: Shoichiro Akaboshi
- Detective Yuji Nakamura: Toshio Tomogane
- Zodiac: Tenmei Basara
  - Zodiac: Shōzō Iizuka (voice)
- Megumi Shion: Masako Takeda
- Metal Master: Hideto Shimamura
- Masato Kazama/Deathferd: Shigeaki Kano
- Mister Bicross: Ken Okabe
- Etsuko Murakoshi: Yoko Hoshi
- Shiozawa: Koda Hozumi
- Doctor Minoh: Isamu Ichikawa
- Kuzan: Isamu Ichikawa

== Songs ==
Opening theme

- "Towa no Chikai" (永遠の誓い; "Eternal Vow")
  - Lyrics, Composition, & Performance: Kenzō Fukuyama
  - Arrangement: KEIME

Ending theme

- "Befriend"
  - Lyrics: Masumi Kawamura
  - Composition: Masahiro Arakawa
  - Arrangement: Seiichi Kyōda
  - Artist: Kotono Shibuya

== International Broadcasts ==
- In the Philippines, it was aired on ABC 5 (now TV5) from 1999 to 2004 with a Tagalog dub.
