= Hoshii =

Hoshii may refer to the following:

- Hoshii Station (糒駅), train station in Tagawa, Fukuoka
- Nanase Hoshii (星井 七瀬), Japanese singer, entertainer, and actress
- Hoshii (糒しい), dehydrated boiled rice once carried as a provision by samurai, comparable to modern instant rice

== See also ==
- Hoshi (disambiguation)
