= Teikyo University Junior College =

Private junior college in Japan

Coordinates: 35°45′30.8″N 139°42′53″E

- 帝京大学短期大学
- Type: Private
- Established: 1962
- Location: Hachiōji, Tokyo, Japan
- Website: www.teikyo-u.ac.jp

Teikyo University Junior College (帝京大学短期大学, Teikyo Daigaku Tanki Daigaku) is a private junior college in Hachiōji, Tokyo, Japan. It was established as women's college in 1965, and became coeducational in 1998.

== Notable alumni ==
- Yoko Hoshi (born 1966) Japanese actress

== See also ==
- Teikyo University
