= Universalove =

- Official poster
- Directed by: Thomas Woschitz
- Written by: Thomas Woschitz
- Produced by: Pol Cruchten; Jeanne Geiben; Gabriele Kranzelbinder
- Starring: Anica Dobra; Stefan Arsenijević; Magda Gomes; Erom Cordeiro; Sri Gordon; Daniel Plier; Matt Fitzgerald; Dusan Askovic; Kyoichi Komoto; Sascha Migge; Damien D. Smith; Makiko Kawai; Liza Machover; Pierre Lopez-Badosa; Samir Menouar
- Cinematography: Enzo Brandner
- Edited by: Thomas Woschitz
- Music by: Naked Lunch
- Release date: 5 September 2008
- Running time: 83 minutes (English); 75 minutes (Austrian)
- Country: Austria
- Languages: English; Japanese; French; Portuguese; Serbian; Luxembourgish
- Budget: €250,000

Universalove is a 2008 Austrian romantic tragedy film directed by Thomas Woschitz. It debuted in Canada at the 2008 Toronto International Film Festival on 5 September 2008, and, after a re-edit which involved substituting the New York episode, was awarded the Max-Ophüls Preis at the 30th Filmfestival Max Ophüls Preis, that took place 16 January to 1 February 2009.

In the US, Universalove screened at the Miami International Film Festival on 14 March 2009, and at the San Joaquin International Film Festival on 17 May 2009 as its Centerpiece Film.

== Plot ==
The film follows the individuals of six unrelated love stories from around the world, some ending in happiness and some ending in tragedy.

In Marseille, a young man (Rashid) flees from a gangster. His girlfriend follows him on a motorcycle. When she arrives at the scene of confrontation, she finds that the gangster is pointing a gun at Rashid, but that they are frozen in time.

In Luxembourg, a married middle-aged man carries on a relationship with a young man.

In Tokyo, a computer technician fixes a computer for a customer. He finds images of a woman on the computer's hard drive and falls in love with her. He tracks her down to the restaurant where she works, and goes there intending to give her a letter telling her of his love for her. Before he enters the restaurant, however, he is randomly stabbed by a passing thug. Unaware that he has been stabbed, he enters the restaurant, sits down and orders a meal from the woman. Before he can give her the letter, he realises that he has been seriously injured and collapses on the floor.

In Belgrade, a woman works in a shop selling wedding dresses. Her unreliable husband plays in a local band. Their relationship falters, but they are eventually reconciled.

In Brooklyn, a young taxi driver is convinced that his girlfriend is seeing another man. While driving the streets, he thinks he sees her on the way to a meeting with her lover. He follows her into an apartment building, but he is mistaken – it is another woman. He returns to his girlfriend, and they are reunited.

In Rio de Janeiro, a woman is watching a TV soap opera when her TV breaks down. She takes it to a TV repair shop. On her way home from the shop, she is hit by a car driven by the good-looking male star of the soap opera, who is on his way to the film set. She is not seriously injured and refuses his offer to take her to the hospital. Instead he takes her to the film set, where she watches the filming and is given a walk-on part in the show where she lovingly embraces him.

== Music ==
The music for the film was composed by the Austrian group Naked Lunch. The group has frequently performed the soundtrack live as an accompaniment to screenings of the film.
