= Love Junkies =

Japanese manga series

恋愛ジャンキー (Renai Junkie)
- Genre: Erotic comedy
- Manga
- Written by: Kyo Hatsuki
- Published by: Akita Shoten
- Magazine: Young Champion
- Original run: 2000 – 2009
- Volumes: 26

Love Junkies (恋愛ジャンキー) is a Japanese erotic comedy manga series written and illustrated by Kyo Hatsuki. It was serialized in Akita Shoten's seinen manga magazine, Young Champion. The manga is licensed in France by Taifu Comics, in Spain by Norma Editorial and in Brazil by Editora JBC. All publishers other than Akita Shoten release the manga as Love Junkies.

== Plot ==
Sakibara Eitaro is a 22-year-old average-level employee who has been a virgin until the beginning of the series, and is desperately trying to find a sexual partner, which eventually happens with an attractive girl named Maiko.

After Maiko, Eitaro's relationship with girls suddenly changes as he becomes more confident in himself and with sex, and he goes on to meet many girls.
