= Inu-Neko =

Japanese manga series

イヌネコ。
- Genre: romantic comedy
- Manga
- Written by: Kyō Hatsuki
- Published by: Kadokawa Shoten
- Published: 1 September 2004
- Volumes: 1
- Live-action film

Ecchi o Nerae! Inu-Neko
- Directed by: Satoshi Kaneda
- Released: 29 August 2009

Inu-Neko (イヌネコ。; "Dog-Cat.") is a Japanese romantic comedy manga written and illustrated by Kyō Hatsuki. A film adaptation premiered on 29 August 2009.
