= Stargazing Dog =

Japanese manga by Takashi Murakami

- Cover of Stargazing Dog as published by Futabasha

星守る犬 (Hoshi Mamoru Inu)
- Manga
- Written by: Takashi Murakami
- Published by: Futabasha
- English publisher: NA: NBM Publishing
- Imprint: Seinen
- Magazine: Weekly Manga Action
- Original run: 5 August 2008 – 3 February 2009
- Volumes: 2

Stargazing Dog (Japanese: 星守る犬, Hepburn: Hoshi Mamoru Inu) is a Japanese manga by Takashi Murakami. The story is narrated by a dog named Happie, who lives with a working-class Japanese family until one day the man's wife requests a divorce, and he takes Happie on a road trip to southern Japan, eventually running out of gas near a campground.

Initially published as a serialized manga, the collected paperback book sold over 400,000 copies in Japan and attracted a film adaptation. Murakami wrote a total of five stories which have Happie's tale as starting point in common. NBM ComicsLit published English translations of the first two in one volume titled Stargazing Dog in November 2011.

== Plot ==
=== Stargazing dog ===
The story is told from the point of view of an Akita dog named Happie, adopted by a working-class Japanese family as a puppy and lives with them for several years. The dog enjoys living with them and especially appreciates the daily walks "Daddy", the name he gives to the man of the family, takes him on. However, years later, the man's wife requests a divorce. Now homeless, jobless and with little money, an upbeat Daddy decides to take Happie on a road trip to southern Japan. Along the way, the pair stop at a convenience store, where Daddy spots a dirty-looking young boy attempting to steal bread. He buys it for him instead, and the boy invites himself into Daddy's car. Daddy agrees to take him wherever he wants to go, but the boy is mostly silent. They sleep in the car, and the next morning Daddy discovers that the boy is gone and has taken his wallet. Not long after, Happie experiences extreme pain while urinating and Daddy rushes him to a veterinarian, where he learns that Happie has kidney stones. They operate, and Daddy is forced to pawn almost everything he owns to pay the bill, leaving him almost penniless. They continue on, eventually running out of gas near a campground. They live there for a while, living off the food they can scrounge and catch and sleeping in the car, until one day Daddy dies in his car of a preexisting heart condition. Happie continues to live there for two winters until one day he perishes as well. The police discover their bodies about three months later, with Happie's loyally body resting next to Daddy's feet.

=== Sunflowers ===
This story begins right where Stargazing Dog ends, when Okutsu, a middle age social worker receives the assignment to locate Daddy's family to inform them about his death. Looking for clues about Daddy's past, he makes the same travel backwards until reaching the point where Daddy sold all his properties to pay for Happie's kidney operation. As he progresses his investigation, reflections about his own life achievements and remembers his childhood with his grandfather, who made a large window on his camp house for his sick wife so she could watch a large sunflowers field while resting on her bed. Okutsu compares his own life with Daddy's, and finally remembers his own behavior with a lonely pup he had when he was a child, bought by his grandpa after his wife died. This dog used to contemplate the stars at night in the sunflowers field for long periods of time, as if he would like to reach them. Eventually Okutsu understands Daddy and Happie's life is a parable of the way as goes the people live, and comes to the conclusion that in the end, we all are like a stargazing dog, always dreaming a way to reach the impossible. Unable to locate any relatives since Daddy intentionally destroyed all traces of his past, Okutsu decides to authorize the cremation of his remains as an unidentified person, and disperses his ashes around Happie's grave, which coincidentally is in the middle of a sunflower field like the one next to his grandfather's home.

== Reception ==
Stargazing Dog received mostly positive reviews from English-language critics. Publishers Weekly said, "The short book offers some profound insight on the human condition (by way of the canine condition) without being too sweet or sappy". However, the reviewer criticized naming the dog "Happie" as heavy-handed and called the decision to tell the story from the dog's point of view "borderline saccharine". Ed Sizemore of Manga Worth Reading placed the book on his list of the ten best manga published in English in 2011, adding, "Everybody and their brother has praised this book and rightly so. It's as moving as everyone says."

The Japanese original, Hoshi Mamoru Inu, sold over 400,000 copies and was made into a film of the same name. The movie merges both stories into one, narrating the life of Happie as a series of flashbacks as Okutsu investigates Daddy's past.

== Sequel ==
Two years after the success of Stargazing Dog, Takashi Murakami wrote three more stories: Twin Star, The Brightest Star and a final epilogue to the series. The three were collected and published by Futabasha in a second volume titled Zoku Hoshi Mamoru Inu (Stargazing Dog's Family), which narrates the individual stories of two characters who originally appeared in Stargazing Dog: Happie's fragile brother Chibi, and Tetsuo, the boy who stole Daddy's wallet respectively.

In Twin Star, we discover that Happie was chosen by Miku as her pet for being an hyperactive healthy dog, while his brother Chibi was discarded due to his delicate and sickly look. The dog was born with a heart condition, so is left to die in a cardboard box, but later adopted by Mrs. Nagano, an old, grumpy, and unfriendly woman who also has delicate health. The woman thinks the puppy could be a good companion until both die due to their respective sicknesses. But, instead, both of their health conditions improve. Then, they become a happy couple and find a long life that is better together despite their shortcomings, which makes this the exact opposite of Daddy and Happie's story.

In Brightest Star it is revealed that Tetsuo is the child of a single mother. Abused and despised by her, he decides to cross the country alone looking for his grandfather who lives in Hokkaido, since he is the only living person among his relatives who ever showed some affection for him. After spending a couple of days enjoying the company of Happie, the kid decides to "adopt" a dog. After taking Daddy's wallet, he steals a two year old pug that nobody wants from a pet store and continues his journey in search for his grandfather while in the company of his new pet. Developing a bond between Happie and Daddy in the course of their journey, Tetsuo decides to name him Happie, after the Akita of the first story.

The final story is actually a short epilogue that connects all four stories. By coincidence, while looking for Daddy to return his stolen wallet, Tetsuo, his grandfather, and his dog, Happie, meet Mrs. Nagano and Chibi in a local cherry-tree field. They tell their respective stories to each other before returning home, unaware that Daddy and Happie's story connects them all. In the final panel, a teenage Miku hugs Chibi, confusing him with the original dog, Happie, making the final connection between all the characters of Stargazing Dog.

Briefly connected to the original story, these three additional narrations expands Happie's universe, implying that every thing we do, even a little moment in time, can have large repercussions on others and change their lives, even if we never have contact with them. The five stories have in common the absolute and unconditional love of dogs for their owners, no matter the circumstances.

== Release ==
The Spanish edition of Stargazing Dog, "El Perro Enamorado de las Estrellas" published by Ponent Mon editorial in Spain compiles all five stories in one single volume with the same title.

In Latin America, all five stories were published by Kamite as "El Perro Guardián de las Estrellas" respecting the original 2 volume format of Futabasha.
