= Yoko Hoshi =

Japanese actress (born 1966)

- 星 ようこ
- Born: 31 August 1966 (age 59); Sendai, Miyagi Prefecture, Japan
- Citizenship: Japan
- Occupation: Actress
- Years active: 1986–
- Agent: Staff-up
- Website: Official profile

Yoko Hoshi (星 ようこ, 星 洋子, 星 洋子, 星 遥子, Hoshi Yōko; born 31 August 1966) is a Japanese actress from Sendai, Miyagi Prefecture.

She graduated from Teikyo University Junior College Secretarial Department.

== Appearances ==
=== TV dramas ===
1986

- Shiro Tora-tai – as Yuki Mase

1987

- Taikō-ki
- Dokuganryū Masamune – as Yurihime
- Announcer Puttsun Monogatari (CX)
- Otoko-tachi ni yoroshiku (TBS)

1988

- Ginga TV Shōsetsu Sōmubusōmuka Roppeita Yamaguchi (NHK) – as Sayoko Yoshizawa
- Motto Abunai Deka Episode 11 "Kekkon" (16 Dec, NTV) – as Hakodate West Police Station detective Mayumi Enomoto*as 星 洋子

1989

- Kinyō SP Nihonhōsō Sakka Kyōkai 30 Shūnenkinen Mysterious Fantasy Pearl 1989-1970 (TBS)

1990

- Aitsu ga Trouble Episode 7 "Bakudan kakaete Tsuppashire" (27 Jan, CX) – as Yuko Kitamura
- Kayō Mystery Gekijō Akakabu Kenjifunsenki (ABC)
- Abunai Onna-tachi (CX)

1991

- Hitori de mite Ne Oppai ga Omotai!! (TBS)
- Nananin no Onna Bengoshi (EX)
- Asa no Renzoku Drama Hana Yūzen (YTV)
- Saturday Night at the Mysteries Bijin Gekai Koroshi (EX) – as Ritsuko Kimura

1992

- Getsuyō Onna no Suspense Joryū Sakka Series (Second Stage) Isho Futatsu (TX)
- Inochimoyu (EX)
- Drama City '92 Manatsu no Yoru no Yume Akai Honeymoon (YTV)
- Oretachi Rookie Cop Episode 10 "Dai Funtō" (16 Jun, TBS)
- Saturday Night at the Mysteries Edogawa Ranpo no Bijo Series: Karakuri Ningyō no Bijo (4 Jul, EX) – as Fumiyo Kobayashi
- Aishino deka Episode 1 "Meikonbi Tanjō! Yūjō no Sōsa" (18 Oct, EX) – as Misako Noguchi
- Ōshin Doctor Jiken Karute Episode 10 "Onna wa Dokyō de Strip" (24 Nov, EX)

1993

- Nananin no Onna Bengoshi (EX)
- Kinyō Drama Watashitte Busu dattano? (TBS)
- Eiga mitaina Koi shitai Fuhō Shinnyū Episode 138 (TX)
- Nikushimi ni Hohoende (TBS)
- Otome no Mystery Chantoko no Giwaku (CX)

1994

- Saturday Night at the Mysteries Edogawa Ranpo no Bijo Series: Midarana Mofuku no Bijo (8 Jan, EX) – as Fumiyo Kobayashi
- Hanjuku Tamago Episodes 4, 7 (CX)
- September Love Story (TBS)

1995

- Shinshun Drama SP Totsukawa Keibu Series 7 "Gōka Tokkyū Twilight Satsujin Jiken" (2 Jan, TBS) – as Kuriko Hiroike
- Kinyō Entertainment Joyū Midori Natsuki Series Hanayakana Jōtaijō (CX)
- Gokenin Zankurō Episode 8 (CX)
- Kayō Mystery Gekijō Shōkyōto Mystery 15 "Yamato-ji-kumi himo Satsujin Jiken" (26 Sep, NTV) – as Nami Hirose (Snack orchid mama)
- Kaze no Keiji Tokyo Hatsu! Episode 5 "Kanzenhanzai no Onna!? Kinen Shashin no Nazo" (15 Nov, EX)

1996

- Saturday Night at the Mysteries Kaseifu wa Mita! 15 "Zaikai Ichizoku no Kyoshoku no Arasoi Rōgai One-man Owner ni Muragaru Onna-tachi no Himitsu" (13 Apr, EX)
- Shichisei Tōshin Guyferd (TX)
- Weekend Drama Hen (EX)
- Itazura na Kiss (EX) – as Seiko Izumi

1997

- Saturday Night at the Mysteries Yakan Kenshō (EX) – as Satomi Yakushiji
- Meitantei Hokenshitsu no Obasan (EX)
- Kinyō Entertainment Kitchen Tantei Chinami Minamimoto no Suiri Nisshi (CX)
- Face (CX)
- Kinyō Entertainment Bijin Kisha Fuyuko Kosaka no Mei Suiri (CX)
- Kinyō Entertainment Nurse na Tantei (CX) – as Kanako Aoki

1998

- Ryakudatsu-ai Abu nai Onna (TBS)
- Saturday Night at the Mysteries Misa Yamamura: Ai no Mashūko Satsujin Jiken (EX) – as Reiko Obayashi
- Saturday Night at the Mysteries Onsen Waka okami no Satsujin Suiri (EX) – as Reiko Ogasawara
- Getsuyō Drama Special Bridal Coordinator no Jiken-bo Nagoya Yometori Satsujin Jiken (TBS) – as Yuka Kanuma
- Kinyō Entertainment Depart Girl Tantei (CX) – as Kaoru Asano

1999

- Saturday Night at the Mysteries Diet Sanshimai no Ryojō Jiken-bo 3 (EX) – as Yumi Takada'
- Omizu no Hanamichi Episodes 9, 10 (CX)
- Getsuyō Drama Special Hostess Tantei Kikiippatsu (TBS) – as Ayako Asaoka
- The Hangman Super 2000 (ABC)
- The Doctor (TBS)
- Kinyō Entertainment Jigoku no Hanayome 1 (CX) – as Motoko Izawa
- Saturday Night at the Mysteries Shūchakueki –Yakō Ressha– (EX)

2000

- Kyoto Sennyū Sōsa-kan Episode 9 (EX) – as Kiko Natsuhara

2001

- Ai wa Seigi (EX) – as Etsuko Yashiro
- Maria (TBS) – as Midori Oshima
- Kinyō Entertainment Bi Esthe Tantei (CX) – as Yoko Kakuza
- Muta Keiji-kan Jiken File 30 (EX) – as Yoshiko Miura
- Shin-D: Ready Made Episodes 1, 2 (NTV) – as Naoko Ono
- Onna to Ai to Mystery Ame no Tabi Kakunodate no Satsujin (TX) – as Otoyakko

2002

- Onna to Ai to Mystery Zeikan Kensakan Yoko Imai Mitsuyu Diamond Satsujin Jiken (TX) – as Atsuko Esaka
- Haruchan 6 Weeks 4, 5 (CX)
- Onna to Ai to Mystery Jiken Kisha Shinsuke Uragami 2 Nagasaki Ijin Yakata no Shisen (TX) – as Otoyakko
- Mokuyō Mystery Kasōken no Onna 4 Episode 3 "Yūrei-kan no Sangeki ni Hime rareta Wana" (8 Aug, EX) – as Chisato Hoshino

2003

- Jikū Keisatsu 3 Prince Shōtoku (NTV)
- Onna to Ai to Mystery Tokusō Keiji Reiko Toyama (TX)
- Kayō Mystery Gekijō Yakatabune no Onna (NTV)
- Saturday Night at the Mysteries Kenji Yoko Asahina (EX)

2004

- Ai no Solea (CX)
- Getsuyō Mystery Gekijō Gomi wa Koroshi o Shitteiru 6 (TBS)
- Saturday Night at the Mysteries Kariya Chichi Musume Series 5 Kyoto Gionmatsuriri Satsujin Jiken (EX)
- Sasori Zenpen (BS-TBS)
- Getsuyō Mystery Gekijō Zaimu Sōsa-kan Ruriko Amamiya (TBS)

2005

- Oniyome Nikki Episode 3 (CX)
- Tabinokaori-ji no Asobi (EX)

2006

- Koisuru Nichiyōbi: New Type Episode 13 (BS-TBS) – as Ryoko Aida
- Jigoku Shōjo Episode 3 (NTV) – as Mari Toriumi
- Getsuyō Mystery Gekijō Nekketsu Kāsan Jiken-bo 2 (TBS)
- Saturday Night at the Mysteries Nemuru Hone (EX)
- Rensa Kaidan: Episode (TVK, KBS)
- Izumo no Okuni Episode 4 (NHK) – as Sakiko Konoe

2007

- Saturday Night at the Mysteries Depart Shikake Hito! Tamami Tennōji no Satsujin Suiri 1 "Manbiki Jiken ni sShikuma reta Kiken na Wana! Renzoku Satsujin no Nazo… Bijin Hanbai-in no Kyōgaku no Kako to Jittai o Abake!!" (15 Sep, EX) – as Ryoko Masuoka

2008

- Tonari no Kramer (CX)
- Kinyō Prestige Tsugarukaikyō Mystery Kōro (7) – Satomi Yoshikawa
- Hisho no Kagami (TX) – as Chiyo Nanbara
- Kinyō Prestige Hakui no Tenshi wa Mita Geka Byōtō Satsujin Karute (CX)

2009

- Saturday Night at the Mysteries Okashina Keiji 5 Inemuri Keiji to Elite Onna Keishi Niigata Tōkamachi Kimono Show ni Chichi Musume Sennyū Sōsa! Nerawareta Butaikami no Jigen Hassha Trick! (28 Mar, EX) – as Megumi Nakahara
- Suiyō Mystery 9 Mikkai no Yado 7 (1 Jul, TX) – as Hitomi Negishi

2010

- Getsuyō Golden Bengoshi Rinko Ichinose 2 (18 Jan, TBS)

2011

- Getsuyō Golden Midorikawa Keibu VS Satsujin Trump (12 Sep, TBS) – as Akemi Hoshino
- Getsuyō Golden Keishichō Minamidaira Han –Shichinin no Keiji– 4 (7 Nov, TBS) – as Yuri Hatano

2013

- Kinyō Prestige Totsugawakeiji no Shōzō 7 (CX) – as Harumi Wakatsuki

2014

- Maruho no Onna –Hoken Hanzai Chōsa-in– Episode 8 (6 Jun, TX) – as Kazuko Tateishi

2015

- Aka to Kuro no Gekijō Obasan Bengoshi Tamako Machida (30 Jan, CX) – as Kanae Yuki
- Saturday Night at the Mysteries Hanzai Shinri-gaku Kyōju Mamoru Kanesaka no Sōsa File 2 (11 Jul, ABC) – as Satomi Maeda

2016

- Suiyō Mystery 9 Mother Kyōkō Han-gakari no Onna –Hata Kiki– (20 Apr, TX) – as Azusa Sawai

=== Films ===
- Akane sasu Heya
- Mayonaka no Shōjo-tachi–Sentimental Highway
- Zenshin to Koyubi
- Memories of Matsuko
- Chikyū no Miryoku – as Kyoko Yasuda
- Ikusa Dai Ni-sen –Nihonmatsu no Tora–
- Dennō Keiji matsuri–Deka-bushi
- L'amant
- Shūchakueki no Tsugi no Eki
- Kindan no Jiken-bo Stalker o Aishita Onna
- Tomato Juice
- Suicide Manual 2 –Chūkyū-hen–
- Seventh Anniversary
- Salaryman Kintarō
- Futei no Kisetsu
- Yowamushi Chinpira
- Bara Hotel
- Higurashi When They Cry
- Body Jack (2008) – as Reiko Sawai
- Tenohira no Shōsetsu (2010) Episode 2 "Thank You" – as Yasuko

To be determined

- Ai no Note
- Kanjō Kyōiku
- Kuraitokorode Machi Awase

=== Direct-to-video ===
- Kyō-jū no Kiba – as Akiko Kamiyama
- Bakusō Tracker Gundan Part 2
- Die Hard Angels –Kiken o Aisuru Onna-tachi–
- Yonimo Kimyōna Monogatari–Bud Girl

=== Internet ===
- Kashima-C (Jun 2006–)
- –Keiji matsuri– Deka-bushi

=== Stage ===
- Mutekina Otokotachi
- Hanshin Daishinsai
- Nekonohige no shikumi
- Seikimatsu Sanninshimai
- My Sweet Baby
- Shujinkō wa Omae janai

=== DVD/video ===
- 1shot 2love Hashire Camera kozō!!
- Renai Hakusho
- The Hangman Super 2000

=== Photo albums ===
- Fandango (14 Sep 1999, Bauhaus)
- Blue Forest (2 Mar 1995, Schola)

=== Advertisements ===
- Taisho Pharmaceutical Co. Prisa Ace
- Toyota Mark X Short Movie "Hashiri Tsuzukeru Otoko" (BS Nittele only, as Misako)
