= Naked Lunch (Austrian band) =

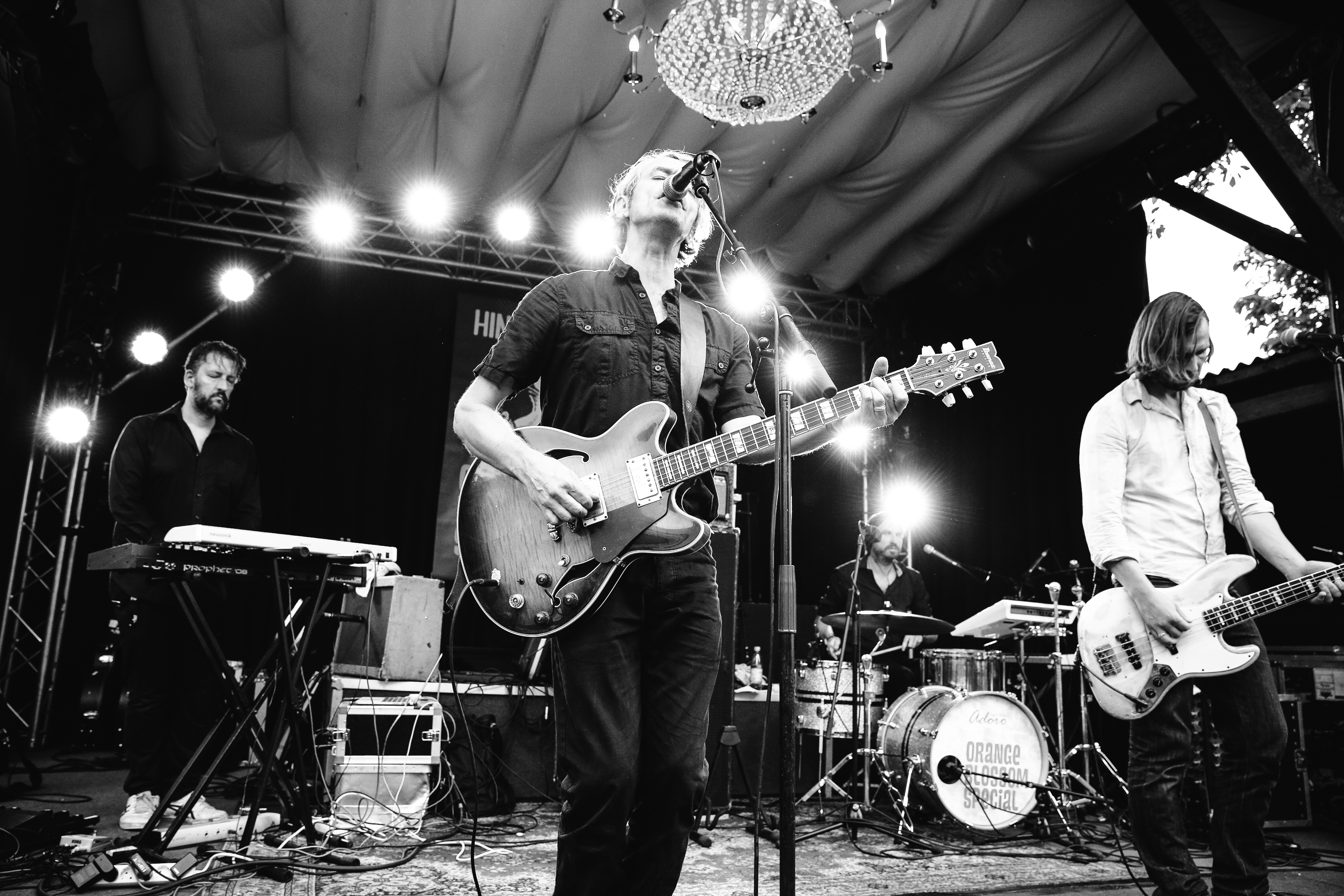
- Naked Lunch at the 2014 Orange Blossom Special Festival in Germany

Background information
- Origin: Klagenfurt, Austria
- Genres: Electronica, Indie, Alternative rock
- Years active: 1991–present
- Labels: Big Store (1991–1997); Mercury Records (1997–1999); Virgin Records (1999); Motor Music Records (2004–2005); Louisville Records (2005–)
- Members: Oliver Welter (vocals, guitar); Romana Jakovcic (bass, vocals); Boris Hauf (keyboards, sax); Wolfgang Lehmann (guitars); Alex Jezdinsky (drums)
- Past members: Georg Timber-Trattnig (bass, 1991–1993); Peter Hornbogner (drums, 1991–2001); Thorsten Thonhauser (drums, 2002–2005); Stefan Deisenberger(keys 1998–2015); Herwig Zamernik (bass 1991–2019)

Naked Lunch is a band from Klagenfurt, Carinthia, Austria, founded in 1991. They started out as an alternative rock band, mixing hard rock guitars and fragile vocals. In the nineties, they connected with the German band The Notwist, in Weilheim, with whom they still have ties; their producer, Olaf Opal, is also working for The Notwist.

The group's album Songs for the Exhausted was recorded after a long hiatus (when they nearly disbanded) and saw the band abandon their rock roots and turn to a more experimental, electronic approach to their songs.

They have a cult following in Austria and Germany. In 2007, a new album, This Atom Heart of Ours, was released.

== History ==
=== Early days (1991–1996) ===
Naked Lunch was named after the novel by William S. Burroughs. The first incarnation of the band was made up of Oliver Welter (vocals and guitar), Georg Timber-Trattnig (bass) and Peter Hornbogner (drums).

Soon after their formation, they sent out demos and were signed on the spot by German Big Store Records, where a first release came out, the 6-track-mini-LP Naked. The year after that, a full-length album followed, titled Balsam. After that, bassist Trattnig left the band to focus on his writing. He died in 2000 due to alcoholism. The song "King George" on Songs for the Exhausted is written about his death.

Trattnig was replaced with Herwig Zamernik (of Disharmonic Orchestra). Zamernik and Welter remained the core of the band to this day.

After a first few successes, the band became hungry for an international breakthrough, but despite playing showcases for major record companies, it took a few years before they were signed by Mercury Records.

=== Superstardom (1997–2000) ===
After being signed to Mercury Records, Naked Lunch took on recording their second album, Superstardom. Recordings took place in Weilheim, New York City and San Francisco. They shot a music video for "Tambourine" in Brazil, where they also damaged equipment on stage. They were arrested in London, where some of the members had relocated.

Soon after that, Stefan Deisenberger joined on keyboards and synths.

In 1999, Love Junkies was released and the single "Closed today" was a minor hit internationally (and also the band's biggest so far), but the album did not sell well. Naked Lunch cut their ties with their label and signed with Virgin Records, where the same record got re-released. But it also flopped on second try and Virgin dropped them.

=== Songs for the Exhausted (2001–present) ===
After the events surrounding the two releases of Love Junkies, Naked Lunch went on hiatus. Oliver Welter had to return to his hometown and lived on the streets and "out of his car", so to speak, for half a year. He often remarks that this phase was one of the hardest in his life and he was sometimes close to the edge. Perhaps the long-time-suicide of Georg Trattnig (as he called his long-term alcoholism which ultimately led to this death) showed Welter that it is better to choose life over death. Also, he fathered a daughter and more recently, a son. Herwig Zamernik is also a father (of four children).

Back to life, Naked Lunch entered the studio again and were all set to record another, perhaps their final album. The old indie rock-concepts were abandoned in favour for a new working technique involving intensive work with computers. Songs for the Exhausted was recorded in Herwig Zamerniks own studio, the "Fuzzroom" in Klagenfurt over the course of a year. Prior to the recording, drummer and founding member Peter "Bogs" Hornbogner left the band - he was later replaced by Thorsten Thonhauser (although most drum tracks on the album were played by session drummers or were programmed). Shortly before the completion of the session, the studio burned down. Zamernik has subsequently built a new "Fuzzroom".

After the recording was finished, the band faced new problems. They were unable to find a record company willing to release the record, which was considered too sad, depressing and generally non-commercial. Finally in 2004, Motor Music Records put their effort out and Naked Lunch were facing generally very good reviews and surprisingly good sales.

In the aftermath, Naked Lunch put out an EP, Stay in 2005 and contributed music to befriended film-maker Thomas Woschitz's project Sperrstunde, which was screened to live backing music by the band. Also, Herwig Zamernik released a solo record, dubbed Fuzzman on Wohnzimmer Records.

In 2006, they composed the music for the episode "Bis in den Tod" of the Austrian mystery serial 8x45 and in 2007 the music for the Elisabeth Scharang TV movie Franz Fuchs - Ein Patriot starring Karl Markovics.

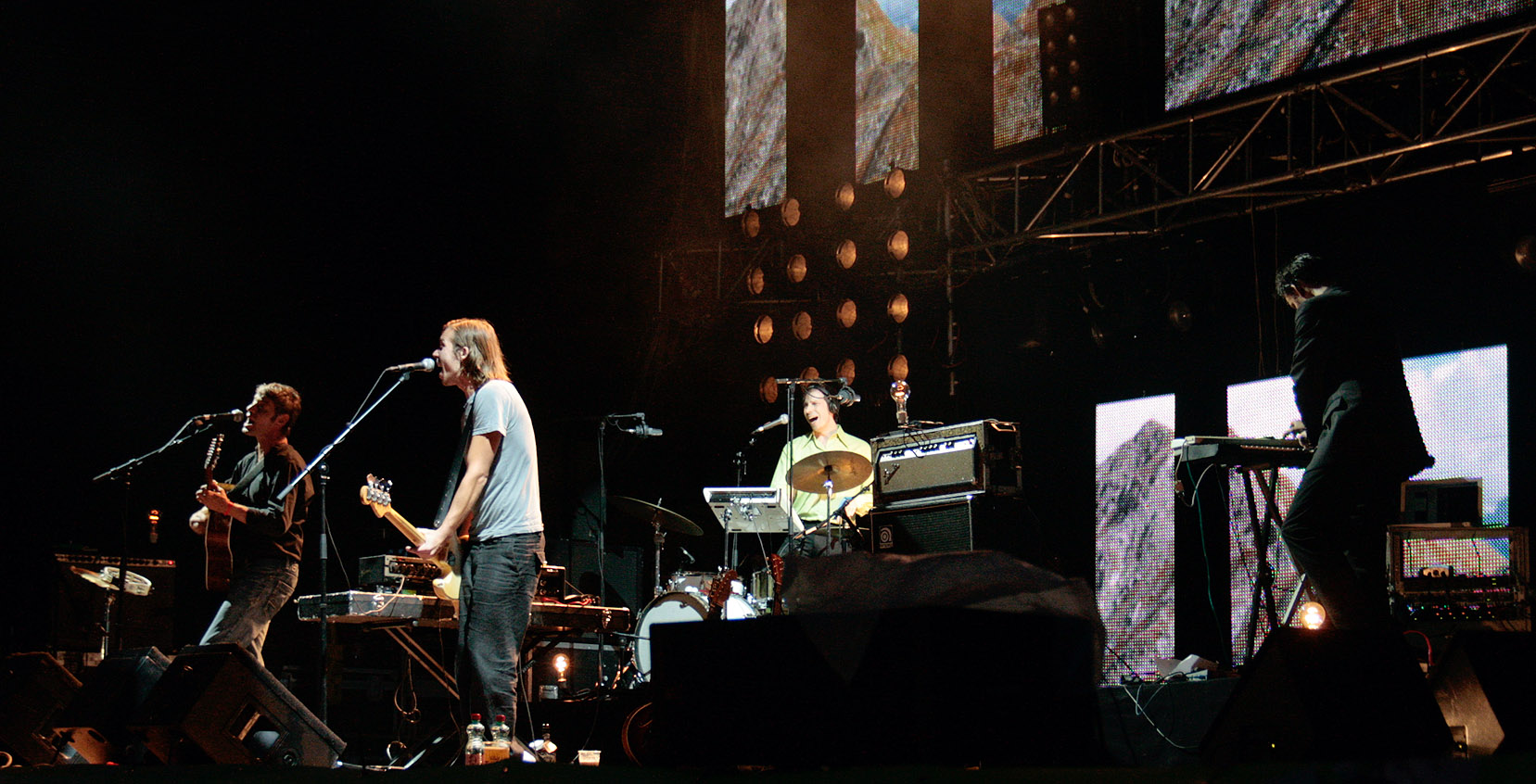
Naked Lunch at Donauinselfest in Wien, Austria, 2009

A new album, This Atom Heart of Ours was released on January 19, 2007. It is the first to include new drummer, Alex Jezdinsky (formerly of Angelika Express), following the departure of Thorsten Thonhauser. Yet it is uncertain if Jezdinsky is a full member, hence he does not appear on any of the promotion photos for the new record nor in the video to the single "Military of the Heart".

The album entered the Austrian longplay charts at #25. In 2008, they composed the film score of Universalove by Thomas Woschitz.

== Discography ==
=== Albums ===
- Balsam (1992)
- Superstardom (1997)
- Love Junkies (1999)
- Songs for the Exhausted (2004)
- This Atom Heart of Ours (2007)
- Universalove (Louisville Records, 2009)
- All Is Fever (Tapete 2013)
- Lights (And A Slight Taste Of Death) (2025)

=== EPs and singles ===
- Naked (Mini-LP, 1991)
- Balsam (Single, 1992)
- WOM Demos (EP, 1995)
- Spark (Single, 1997)
- Tambourine (Single, 1997)
- Me (Single, 1997)
- Closed Today (Single, 1999)
- On a Sunny Day (Single, 1999)
- Disco Sadness (Single, 1999)
- Stay (EP, 2005)
- Military of the Heart (Single, 2006)
- Universalove (Brooklyn) (Single, 2009)
- Here Come The Bells (Single, 2018)
