= Kotono Shibuya =

Japanese actress and singer (born 1975)

- 渋谷 琴乃
- Born: 9 June 1975 (age 51); Tokyo, Japan
- Occupations: Actress; singer
- Notable work: Bokura no Nanoka Kansensō 2 as Hitomi Nakayama; Ai wa Dōda as Sanae Misaki; Joyū Kyōko as Tomoko Ōno
- Spouse: Kou Watanabe (m. 1998)
- Children: 2

Kotono Shibuya (渋谷 琴乃, Shibuya Kotono; born 9 June 1975) is a Japanese actress and singer. She is known for starring as Hitomi Nakayama in Bokura no Nanoka Kansensō 2 (1991), Sanae Misaki in Ai wa Dōda (1992), and Tomoko Ōno in Joyū Kyōko (2001). She released two singles from EMI Music Japan, and one of her songs was "Befriend", the ending theme of the tokusatsu series Shichisei Tōshin Guyferd.

== Biography ==
Kotono Shibuya was born on 9 June 1975 in Tokyo. Her career began during her childhood. She was educated at Horikoshi High School.

She starred in the 1991 film Bokura no Nanoka Kansensō 2 as Hitomi Nakayama; Excite News described her personality as Hitomi as "rather loose [...] with her special skill being genki". In 1992, she starred with Ken Ogata in the TBS drama Ai wa Dōda as Sanae Misaki. She appeared in the 1994 movie Ghost Pub. In 2001, she starred with Keiko Oginome in the drama Joyū Kyōko as Tomoko Ōno. She has also acted in stage productions. CDJournal praised her acting skills as "solid".

Her debut single, "Ballerina ni Naritai/Blue Horizon", was released from EMI Music Japan on 14 October 1992. She sang "Befriend", the ending theme of the tokusatsu series Shichisei Tōshin Guyferd; it was released as a single from EMI Music Japan on 5 June 1996. She also had another CD release in 1996, "Let Me Try".

She was also a radio personality, appearing in such programmes as MBS Radio's Shibuya Kotono no Onakasuita and Nippon Cultural Broadcasting's Shibuya Kotono no Nashire Kayōkyoku Sunday Special.

The 1996 video game Mega Man X3 (Rockman X3) features "One More Time" and "I'm Believer" as the opening and closing themes in the PlayStation and Saturn versions in Japan.

She married actor Kou Watanabe in 1998. They had two sons before his death in 2020.

== Filmography ==
=== Television ===
Year	Title	Role	Ref.
1992	Ai wa Dōda	Sanae Misaki	
2001	Joyū Kyōko	Tomoko Ōno	

=== Film ===
Year	Title	Role	Ref.
1991	Bokura no Nanoka Kansensō 2	Hitomi Nakayama	
1994	Ghost Pub		

== Discography ==
=== Singles ===
Title	Details	Peak chart positions		Ref.
Title	Details	JPN	JPN Hot	Ref.
"Ballerina ni Naritai/Blue Horizon"	Released: 14 October 1992; Label: EMI Music Japan	—	—	
"Befriend/One More Time"	Released: 5 June 1996; Label: EMI Music Japan	—	—	
"—" denotes releases that did not chart or were not released in that region.
