= Thomas Woschitz =

Austrian film director, screenwriter and film editor

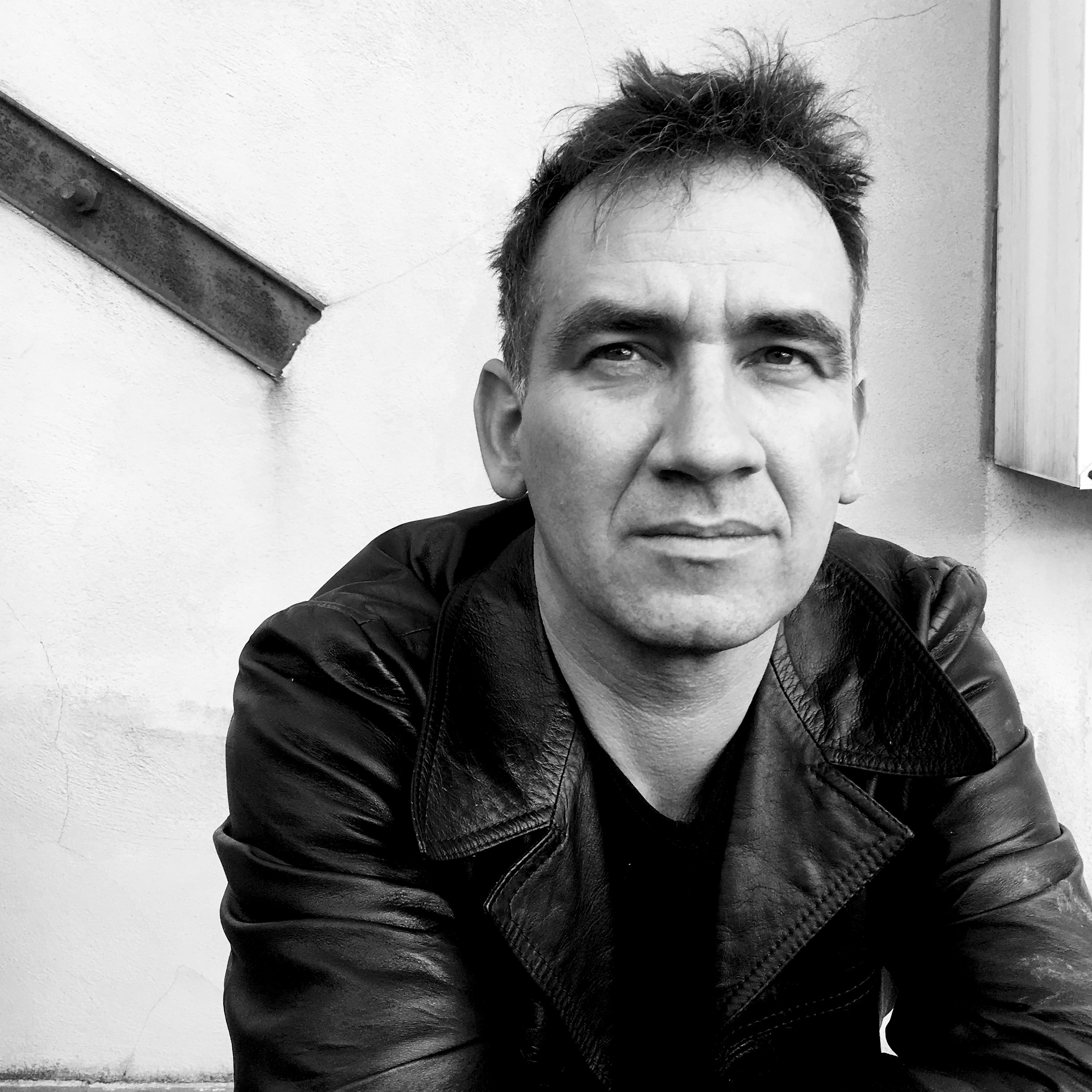
- Born: 22 April 1968 (age 58)
- Occupations: Film Director, Screenwriter, Film Editor

Thomas Woschitz (born 22 April 1968, in Klagenfurt am Wörthersee) is an Austrian film director, screenwriter and film editor.

== Life and work ==
Thomas Woschitz grew up in Austria and studied at the Centro Sperimentale di Cinematografia in Rome under Lina Wertmüller. After working as a film editor for feature films (he was nominated for a Silver Ribbon award for Best Editing for La Capa Gira, directed by Alessandro Piva), he went on to direct a series of short films that were screened at major film festivals: Girls and Cars (2004) was screened in the Semaine de la Critique section of the Cannes Film Festival.

His long collaboration with the Austrian indie band Naked Lunch led to the creation of the "film concert" Sperrstunde (2005), which was screened in competition at the Locarno Film Festival. In 2009 he was awarded the Max Ophüls Prize for his episodic music film Universalove, which also features music by the band Naked Lunch. His second feature film Bad Luck (2015), which stars Valerie Pachner, was praised for its tragic-comic nature and Woschitz's work with lay actors.

== Filmography ==
- 1995: Tascheninhalt und Nasenbluten (short)
- 1996: Blindgänger (short)
- 2004: Girls and Cars in a Colored New World (short)
- 2005: Sperrstunde
- 2008: Universalove
- 2015: Bad Luck

== Awards ==
- 2009: Max Ophüls Prize for Universalove (2009)
