= Hoshi Mamoru Inu =

- Film Poster
- Directed by: Tokiyuki Takimoto
- Written by: Takashi Murakami (manga)
- Story by: Kotommi Aoki (manga)
- Starring: Toshiyuki Nishida, Tetsuji Tamayama, Umika Kawashima
- Distributed by: Toho
- Release date: 11 June 2011 (Japan)
- Country: Japan
- Language: Japanese

Hoshi Mamoru Inu (星守る犬) (English title: Star Watching Dog) is a 2011 Japanese film loosely based on the manga of the same name and directed by Tokiyuki Takimoto. It was released on 11 June 2011.

== Cast ==
- Toshiyuki Nishida as "Daddy", the name Happie gives to the man of the family. His real name is never revealed.
- Happie as himself. A white Akita dog.
- Tetsuji Tamayama as Kyosuke Okutsu
- Umika Kawashima as Yuki Kawamura
- Kimiko Yo as the innkeeper
- Yoichi Nukumizu as Tomita
- Mari Hamada as Tomita's wife
- Sansei Shiomi as Nishitani, a manager
- Shido Nakamura as a Convenient Store Manager
- Kayoko Kishimoto as the mom
- Tatsuya Fuji as Kyosuke's grandfather
- Tomokazu Miura as the seaside restaurant owner

== Synopsis ==
In the middle of a camping field, an unidentified male corpse is discovered inside an abandoned van, with a dead dog body resting at its feet. Kyosuke Okutsu, a social worker is assigned to locate the man's family and inform them about his death. As he investigates, Okutsu notes some similarities between the man's life and his own, so he decides not only to conduct his investigations the usual way, but also take the opportunity to travel across the country while reconstructing the man's life. In the middle of his journey, a teenage girl named Yuki asks him for a ride. The girl does not provide further information about herself, except that she attended an Idol audition, but after being rejected, she doesn't have enough money to continue traveling on her own. With her assistance, Okutsu continues looking for clues about "Daddy"'s past.

Using a few invoices and consume tickets found in the van, Okutsu and Yuki are able to locate some stores where Daddy and Happie spend some time before their death. As their investigation progresses, the couple discovers the deep relation Daddy had with his dog. The man was a common middle class wielding worker with an average family, but at some point his life gradually deteriorated. He had a heart condition, which caused him some trouble at his workplace for which he is eventually fired. Tired of a long life together without better expectations, his wife requests a divorce. Now jobless, homeless and with little money in his pockets, Daddy decides to put all the stuff he has left inside the van on a road trip to southern Japan, with Happie as only companion.

A convenience store manager gives Okutsu some additional information: the pair was at his convenience store, where Daddy spotted a dirty-looking young boy attempting to steal bread. He buys it for him instead, and the boy invites himself into Daddy's car. Daddy agrees to take him wherever he wants to go, but the boy is mostly silent. They sleep in the car, and the next morning Daddy discovers that the boy is gone and has taken his wallet.

Not long after, Happie experiences extreme pain while urinating and Daddy rushes him to a veterinarian, where he learns that Happie has kidney stones. They operate, and Daddy is forced to pawn almost everything he owns to pay the bill, leaving him almost penniless. In a final stop at a seaside restaurant, Daddy decides to leave Happie since his health is deteriorating rapidly, and talks to the restaurant owner, who also loves dogs, about adopting him, but the dog refuses to be separated from his owner. They continue on, eventually running out of gas near a campground. They live inside the van for a while, living off the food they can scrounge and catch and sleeping in the car, until one day Daddy dies in his car. Happie assumes he's just sleeping, and loyally stays at his side, and continues scouting for food for both. During one of his patrols, Happie mistakes a camping family for his own, and tries to steal food from their grill. The family man, taking him for a dangerous stray dog attacks him. Fatally wounded, Happie manages to return to Daddy's car to die at the feet of his owner.

Okutsu compares his own life with Daddy's, and finally remembers his own behavior with a lonely dog named Kuro he had when he was a child, bought by his grandpa after his wife died. This dog used to contemplate the stars at night in the sunflowers field for long periods of time, as if he would like to reach them. Eventually Okutsu understands Daddy and Happie's life is a parable of the way as goes the people live, and comes to the conclusion that in the end, we all are like a stargazing dog, always dreaming a way to reach the impossible. Unable to locate any relatives since Daddy intentionally destroyed all traces of his past, Okutsu decides to authorize the cremation of his remains as an unidentified person, and disperses his ashes around Happie's grave, so the couple can finally be together again. Yuki confesses she's a runaway girl, but after knowing the complete story of Daddy and Happy, she decides to return home.

== Differences between the manga and the movie ==
The biggest difference between the original Stargazing Dog story and the movie is that in the manga Happie is the main character and narrator. The story is told from the point of view of the dog in proper chronological order, starting when the new born puppy is adopted and ends when he dies as an adult 9 years later. A second story in the serialized manga titled "Sunflowers" introduces Okutsu as a separated narration, told as a series of flashbacks as his relation with his own dog are gradually introduced to the audience. The movie inverses this plot, presenting Sunflowers as the main narration with Okutsu as the protagonist instead of Happie.

Several secondary characters are silent on the manga, but they play a bigger role in the movie, providing Okutsu relevant information to reconstruct Daddy's life.

Yuki is a new character created exclusively for the movie, so Okutsu may have someone to talk with about Daddy along his journey.

== Reception ==
Richard Grey, reviewing the film ahead of the 2011 Japanese Film Festival in Australia, wrote that "this epic journey of one dog’s devotions to his master is guaranteed not to leave a dry eye in the house."
