= List of Austrian films of the 1990s =

A list of films produced in the Cinema of Austria in the 1990s ordered by year of release. For an alphabetical list of articles on Austrian films see Category:Austrian films.

== 1990 ==
Title	Director	Cast	Genre	Studio/Notes
Die Piefke-Saga; (The Piefke Saga)	Felix Mitterer		Satire	

== 1991 ==
Title	Director	Cast	Genre	Studio/Notes
I Love Vienna	Houchang Allahyari		Comedy	
Malina	Werner Schroeter	Isabelle Huppert, Mathieu Carrière	Drama	Entered into the 1991 Cannes Film Festival
Nach Jerusalem; (To Jerusalem)	Ruth Beckermann		Documentary	
Requiem for Dominic	Robert Dornhelm		Documentary	

== 1992 ==
Title	Director	Cast	Genre	Studio/Notes
The Arrival of Averill	Michael Schottenberg	Andras Jones	Drama	Screened at the 1992 Cannes Film Festival
Benny's Video	Michael Haneke	Arno Frisch, Angela Winkler, Ulrich Mühe	Drama	Wega Film.; Prix FIPRESCI (Critics' Award) of the European Film Academy, Wiener Filmpreis of the Viennale
Das Fest des Huhnes; (The Festival of the Chicken)	Walter Wippersberg		Documentary, Comedy	
Rochade	Peter Patzak	Michael York, Iris Berben, Ernst Schröder, Jaroslav Filip	Spy thriller	Austrian-Czechoslovak co-production

== 1993 ==
Title	Director	Cast	Genre	Studio/Notes
Indien; (India)	Paul Harather		Tragicomedy	Film Prize of the Minister-President of Saarland and Public Prize at the Filmfestival Max Ophüls Preis
Mother's Day	Harald Sicheritz	Alfred Dorfer, Roland Düringer, Andrea Händler, Eva Billisich	Comedy	
Trotsky	Leonid Maryagin		Drama, Biography	Ö/RU/CH/USA/MEX/TUR
Yara; (The Wound)	Yilmaz Arslan			

== 1994 ==
Title	Director	Cast	Genre	Studio/Notes
71 Fragments of a Chronology of Chance	Michael Haneke	Gabriel Cosmin Urdes, Lukas Miko, Otto Grünmandl, Anne Bennent, Udo Samel	Drama	
1945	Peter Patzak	Konstantin Wecker, Cornelia Froboess, Vadim Glowna, Juraj Kukura, Joachim Bißmeier	Historical drama	
I Promise	Wolfgang Murnberger	Christoph Dostal	Drama	
International Zone	Milan Dor	David Steffen, Peter Lohmeyer, Sophie von Kessel, Jennifer Nitsch, Gunther Philipp, Johannes Silberschneider, Relja Bašić, Erwin Leder	Drama	
Die Nacht der Nächte	Xaver Schwarzenberger	Senta Berger	Comedy	
The Quality of Mercy	Andreas Gruber	Oliver Broumis, Merab Ninidze, Volkmar Kleinert	Historical drama	Jury Award at San Sebastián International Film Festival
Tafelspitz	Xaver Schwarzenberger	Annika Pages, Jan Niklas, Christiane Hörbiger, Otto Schenk	Comedy	

== 1995 ==
Title	Director	Cast	Genre	Studio/Notes
Ant Street	Michael Glawogger	Robert Meyer, Monika Tajmar, Bibiane Zeller	Comedy	Dor Film
Before Sunrise	Richard Linklater	Ethan Hawke, Julie Delpy, Hanno Pöschl		
Die Fernsehsaga – Eine steirische Fernsehgeschichte; (The Saga of TV: A Styrian Television History)	Julian Pölsler	Leon Askin	Drama	Epo-Film.; Mostly shown in two parts, as it lasts 185 min
Freispiel; (Free Play)	Harald Sicheritz		Comedy	Schneiderbauer-Film.; Romy 1996 as most successful film of the year
Joint Venture	Dieter Berner	Gregor Bloéb		Epo-Film
Lovers	Xaver Schwarzenberger	Michaela May, Erwin Steinhauer, Diego Wallraff		

== 1996 ==
Title	Director	Cast	Genre	Studio/Notes
Charms Zwischenfälle; (Charms Incidents)	Michael Kreihsl		Drama	Wega Film.; Caligari Filmpreis at the Berlinale
Jenseits des Krieges; (Beyond the War)	Ruth Beckermann		Documentary	Aichholzer-Film; Wiener Filmpreis
Jugofilm	Goran Rebić	Wolf Bachofner, Michael Jovanovic	Drama	Avanti-Films
Schwarzfahrer; (Unlicensed Driver)	Nikolaus Leytner	Lukas Resetarits, Andreas Lust	Tragicomedy	Allegro Film / Geco Bildwaren
Tempo	Stefan Ruzowitzky	Xaver Hutter, Nicolette Krebitz, Dani Levy	Comedy	
Die totale Therapie; (Total Therapy)	Christian Frosch	Blixa Bargeld, Sophie Rois, Lars Rudolph	Thriller	

== 1997 ==
Title	Director	Cast	Genre	Studio/Notes
Bella Ciao	Xaver Schwarzenberger	Senta Berger	Comedy	
The Castle	Michael Haneke	Ulrich Mühe, Susanne Lothar, Frank Giering		
Debt of Love (Die Schuld der Liebe)	Andreas Gruber	Sandrine Bonnaire, Rüdiger Vogler, Hanns Zischler	Drama	Austrian-Swiss-French co-production
Ein fast perfekter Seitensprung; (An Almost Perfect Affair)	Reinhard Schwabenitzky	Elfi Eschke	Comedy	Epo-Film / Star-Film
Eine fast perfekte Scheidung; (An Almost Perfect Divorce)	Reinhard Schwabenitzky	Elfi Eschke	Comedy	
Funny Games	Michael Haneke	Ulrich Mühe, Susanne Lothar, Frank Giering, Arno Frisch		Entered into the 1997 Cannes Film Festival
Hannah	Reinhard Schwabenitzky	Elfi Eschke, August Zirner		
Qualtingers Wien; (Qualtinger's Vienna)	Harald Sicheritz	Wolf Bachofner, Eva Billisich		MR Film.; Erich-Neuberg-Preis 2000
Ein Schutzengel auf Reisen	Peter Weck	Otto Schenk, Fritz Muliar, Peter Weck, Christiane Hörbiger, Gerd Baltus, Olivia Pascal, Ivan Desny	Comedy	
Shanghai 1937	Peter Patzak	Annie Girardot		Entered into the 20th Moscow International Film Festival
Single Bells	Xaver Schwarzenberger	Martina Gedeck, Inge Konradi	Comedy	Teamfilm Wien / ORF / BR
The Unfish	Robert Dornhelm	Maria Schrader, Eva Herzig, Andreas Lust	Romantic comedy	Terra-Film

== 1998 ==
Title	Director	Cast	Genre	Studio/Notes
Helden in Tirol; (Heroes in Tyrol)	Niki List	Heinz-Josef Braun, Werner Brix	Comedy	
Hinterholz 8	Harald Sicheritz	Roland Düringer, Nina Proll	Comedy	Dor Film
In Heaven	Michael Bindlechner	Sylvie Testud, Xaver Hutter, Merab Ninidze		
The Inheritors	Stefan Ruzowitzky	Sophie Rois, Simon Schwarz	Drama	Dor Film / ORF / BR.; First Prize at the Rotterdam International Film Festival, Prix FIPRESCI at the Valladolid International Film Festival and others
Irrlichter; (The Darkness Experiment / Jack O'Lanterns)	Christoph Kühn	Barbara Auer, Tobias Langhoff	Thriller	D/Ö/CH
Komm, süßer Tod; (Come, Sweet Death)	Wolfgang Murnberger	Josef Hader, Simon Schwarz		
Krambambuli	Xaver Schwarzenberger	Tobias Moretti, Gabriel Barylli, Christine Neubauer		
Opernball; (Opera Ball)	Urs Egger	Heiner Lauterbach, Franka Potente, Frank Giering, Caroline Goodall, Richard Bohringer, Gudrun Landgrebe, Désirée Nosbusch	TV Police Thriller	Sat.1 / Satel Film / Constantin Film
Quintett komplett; (Quintet Complete)	Wolfgang Murnberger			Nominated for the Adolf-Grimme-Preis 2000
Suzie Washington	Florian Flicker	Birgit Doll, August Zirner, Wolfram Berger	Road Movie	Vision-Film

== 1999 ==
Title	Director	Cast	Genre	Studio/Notes
Eine fast perfekte Hochzeit; (An Almost Perfect Wedding)	Reinhard Schwabenitzky	Elfi Eschke, Andreas Vitasek	Comedy	
Der Feuerteufel – Flammen des Todes; (Flames of Death)	Curt Faudon	Heino Ferch, Natalia Wörner	TV Thriller	Sat.1
Ein flüchtiger Zug nach dem Orient; (A Speedy Train to the Orient)	Ruth Beckermann		Documentary	Aichholzer-Film
Girls Under Investigation (Untersuchung an Mädeln)	Peter Payer	Elke Winkens, Anna Thalbach, Otto Sander, Max Tidof		Dor Film.; Film of book (after Albert Drach); Public Prize of the International Film Festival Mannheim-Heidelberg
In Heaven	Michael Bindlechner	Sylvie Testud, Xaver Hutter, Merab Ninidze		
Inter-View	Jessica Hausner	Birgit Doll, Hagnot Elischka		
Northern Skirts	Barbara Albert	Nina Proll, Edita Malovčić	Drama	Fama / Lotus / Zero.; Wiener Filmpreis 1999, Prix FIPRESCI 1999 etc.
Outer Space	Peter Tscherkassky		Short film, animation	Black and white
Wanted	Harald Sicheritz		Western	MR Film.; Romy 2000
