= Cinema of Austria =

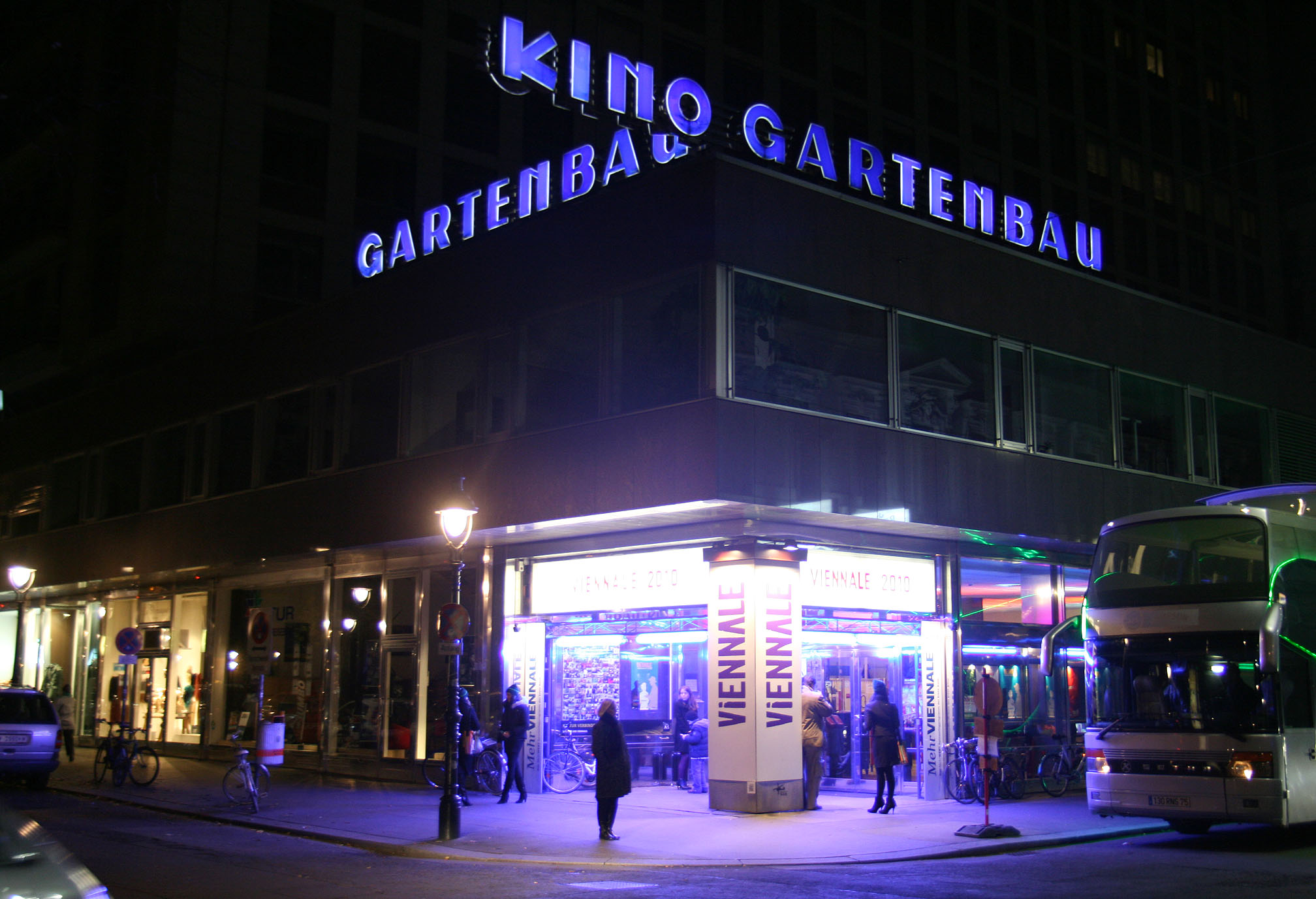
- The Gartenbaukino in Vienna during the Vienna International Film Festival 2010
- No. of screens: 577 (2011)
  - Per capita: 7.6 per 100,000 (2011)
- Main distributors: Uip 17.6% Warner Bros. 16.4% Constantin 14.4%

Produced feature films (2011)
- Fictional: 35
- Animated: -
- Documentary: 19

Number of admissions (2011)
- Total: 15,752,844
  - Per capita: 1.98 (2012)

Gross box office (2011)
- Total: €124 million

Cinema of Austria refers to the film industry based in Austria. Austria has had an active cinema industry since the early 20th century when it was the Austro-Hungarian Empire, and that has continued to the present day. Producer Sascha Kolowrat-Krakowsky, producer-director-writer Luise Kolm and the Austro-Hungarian directors Michael Curtiz and Alexander Korda were among the pioneers of early Austrian cinema. Several Austrian directors pursued careers in Weimar Germany and later in the United States, among them Fritz Lang, G. W. Pabst, Josef von Sternberg, Billy Wilder, Fred Zinnemann, and Otto Preminger.

Between the two World Wars, directors like E. W. Emo and Henry Koster - the latter of whom had emigrated from Austria, provided examples of Austrian film comedies. At the same time, Willi Forst and Walter Reisch founded the Wiener Film genre. After Austria had become a part of Nazi Germany in 1938, Vienna's Wien-Film production company became an important studio for seemingly non-political productions. In the aftermath of World War II, Austria's film production soon restarted, partially supported by the Allied Forces. Veteran and new directors such as Ernst Marischka, Franz Antel, Geza von Cziffra, Geza von Bolvary and Walter Kolm-Veltee revised the comedy, provincial Heimatfilm, and biopic traditions, and began a new genre of the opulent imperial epic (e.g. Marischka's Sissi films and Antel's imperial era musicals) which rivaled Hollywood entertainment at the international box office.

The 1950s brought Austria the largest film production boom in its history, but without a neorealist or New Wave school, which had revitalized other European cinemas during this era, and with no national subsidies, the commercial Austrian film industry collapsed by 1968 and experimental film remained very limited. By the 1970s, television had become the medium for entertainment film, the short films of the radical Viennese Actionism movement rejected narrative structure completely, and Austria's alpine landscape as well some of its directors and actors were used for West German sex comedy productions.

With national subsidy arriving in 1981, a new generation of Austrian filmmakers established themselves at home and international festivals in the 1980s and 90s, among them Axel Corti, Niki List, Paul Harather, Michael Haneke, Barbara Albert, Harald Sicheritz, Stefan Ruzowitzky and Ulrich Seidl. In the first decade of the 21st century, Austrian cinema found its long-delayed New Wave and international critical success.

Austrian or Austrian-identifying actors who have achieved international success from the 1920s to the present include Erich von Stroheim, Elisabeth Bergner, Joseph Schildkraut, Paul Henreid, Hedy Lamarr, Walter Slezak, Oskar Homolka, Nadja Tiller, Senta Berger, Klaus Maria Brandauer, Maximilian Schell, Maria Schell, Romy Schneider, Oskar Werner, Vanessa Brown, Gusti Huber, Curd Jürgens, Lotte Lenya, Kurt Kasznar, Marisa Mell, Helmut Berger, Bibi Besch, Arnold Schwarzenegger, and Christoph Waltz.

== History ==
=== Before 1918 ===
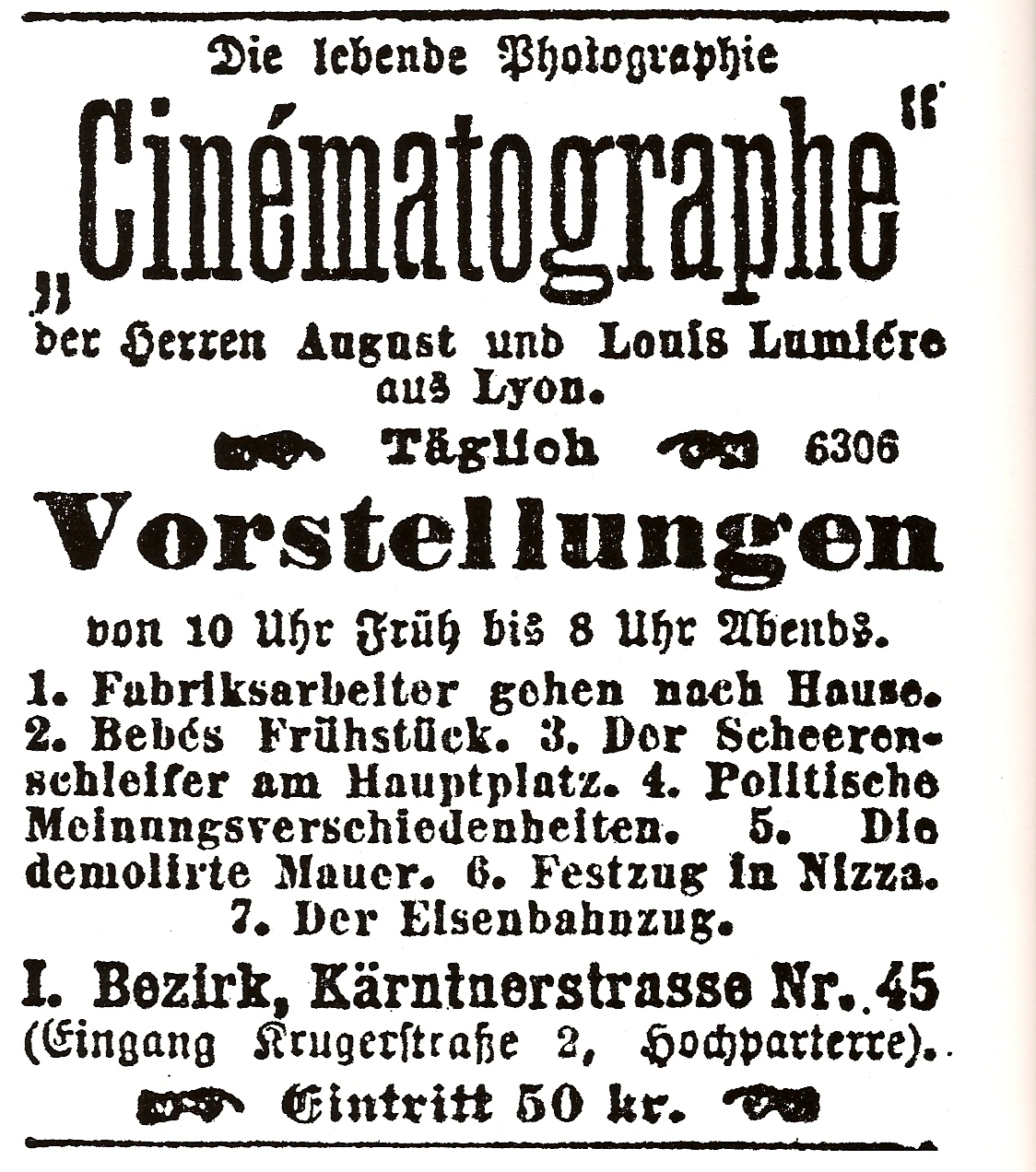
An advertisement for films by the French Brothers Lumière in Vienna from 1896.

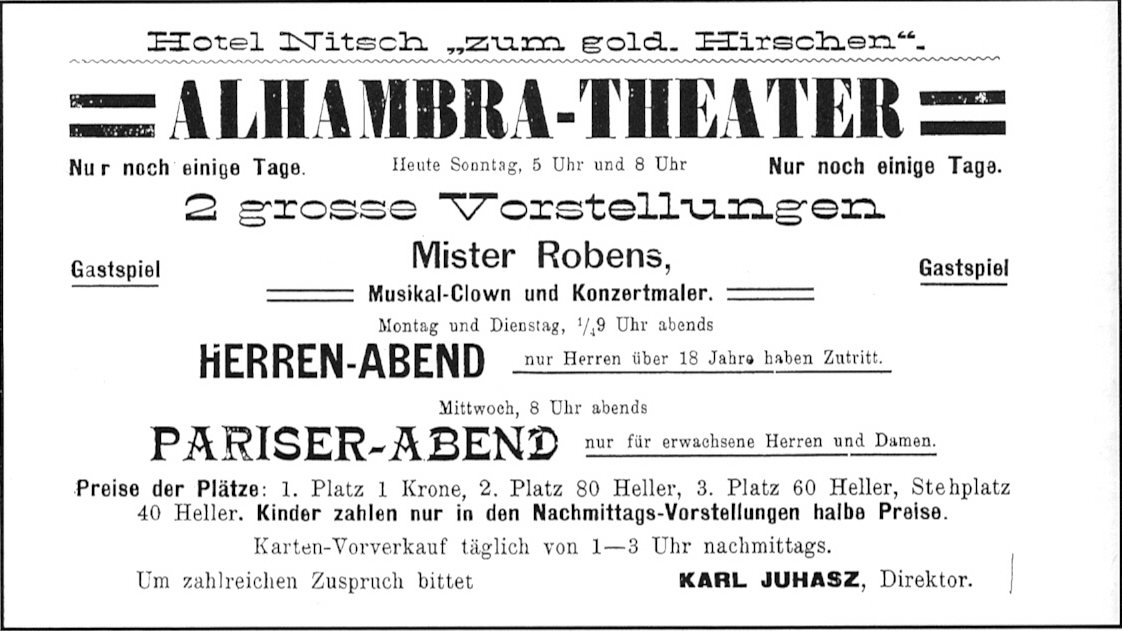
Advertisement for "Pariser-Abend" (Paris evening) and "Herren-Abend" (gentlemen's evening) with erotic movie screenings of the "wandering cinema", Alhambra-Theater, 1906.

Between 1896 and about 1905 the only films produced in Austria were newsreels, mostly by French companies such as Pathé Frères and Gaumont. The first films by an Austrian filmmaker were a series of short erotic movies such as Am Sklavenmarkt produced by the photographer Johann Schwarzer, who founded the Saturn-Film company in 1906. Some of his productions have been found and restored in recent years by the Filmarchiv Austria.

Mainstream film production began in 1910 when the company "Erste österreichische Kinofilms-Industrie" (later Wiener Kunstfilm) was founded by Anton Kolm, his wife Luise Kolm, and Jacob Fleck. They started with newsreels but soon began to produce fiction films. In 1912 Count Sascha Kolowrat-Krakowsky, a wealthy nobleman from Bohemia, founded the Sascha-Film company. In the period before 1918 it grew into the largest production company in Austria; its main competitor was Wiener Kunstfilm. After the start of World War I the Austrian film industry grew in strength, as many foreign companies, including those of France's powerful film industry, were no longer allowed to produce or distribute films in Austria. In the period 1914 to 1918, nearly 200 movies were produced in Austria - twice as many as in all the years before.

Some Austrian filmmakers had already emigrated and begun careers in the United States by this time. Erich von Stroheim and Josef von Sternberg were just two of the natives of Austria who contributed to the early success of Hollywood. Lesser known filmmakers who began their career in the US were for example Henry Lehrman, who staged a few hundred slapstick movies, including the first four movies starring Charlie Chaplin. The founder of Fox Film Corporation, William Fox (born as Wilhelm Fuchs) and the first independent producer in Hollywood, Sam Spiegel, were also native Austrians, born as German speaking Jews in Austria-Hungary. The co-founder of Metro-Goldwyn-Mayer, Marcus Loew, was born as son of Jewish emigrants of Austria-Hungary.

=== 1918 to 1936 ===
After the end of World War I, film production continued to grow, because the then Austrian currency, the Krone, was very weak. As a result, Austrian films were cheaper than those from other countries. In the years 1919 to 1922 Austrian film production reached its all-time peak with a yearly output of 100 to 140 films.

Many of the films produced in this period were of a lower quality than those of established film-producing nations like France, Great Britain, Denmark, Germany and Italy. But among the mass of low-grade productions there were also films by producers and directors who attached importance to quality. Consequently, the expressionist style of film-making had its beginnings not only in German but also in Austrian cinema, for example in Paul Czinner's Inferno (1920). The script of one of the most important German expressionist films, The Cabinet of Dr. Caligari (1920), was written by two Austrians, Carl Mayer and Hans Janowitz. They, along with Fritz Lang and Paul Czinner, also worked in Berlin at that time as Berlin was the centre of the German-language film industry. The Austrian Fritz Kortner, who worked in both Germany and Austria - for example in Austrian pre-expressionist productions such as Der Mandarin (1918) - was one of the most noted expressionist actors. The best known Austrian expressionist film is The Hands of Orlac (1924) by German director Robert Wiene which starred Conrad Veidt and Fritz Kortner.

Around 1923 the whole European film industry went into decline due to growing competition from the United States. American films could be exported to Europe very cheaply, because the production costs had already been earned back at the American box-office. The European film industry, divided into many different countries and many different languages, could not produce quality films at a low enough price to compete with the American imports. Another issue which affected Germany and Austria was the successful reining in of hyperinflation. Austrian films were no longer especially cheap and exports fell. As a result, Austrian film production had reduced by the mid-twenties to between 20 and 30 films per year, a level commensurate with its new greatly reduced size after World War I. In the whole silent movie era around 1,000 films were produced in Austria.

The 1920s were also the age of the epic film, on the model of films of the pre-war period from the United States (for example those of D.W. Griffith) and Italy. In Austria the Austro-Hungarian filmmakers Michael Curtiz and Alexander Korda produced epic films for Sascha-Film and Vita-Film (the successor company of Wiener Kunstfilm), among them Prinz und Bettelknabe (1920), Samson und Delila (1922), Sodom und Gomorrha (1922), Der Junge Medardus (1923), Die Sklavenkönigin (1924), Harun al Rashid (1924) and Salammbo (1925). These films were the biggest ever produced in Austria, with enormous production costs, up to 10,000 costumed extras, and huge sets such as the "Temple of Sodom" which were designed and built by Austria's top set designers of the period, Emil Stepanek, Artur Berger and Julius von Borsody. The who's-who of the Austrian film scene worked on these films. Leading cinematographers like Franz Planer and Hans Theyer photographed the films, and the directors' wives, Lucy Doraine (Michael Curtiz) and Maria Corda (Alexander Korda), were the films' leading ladies. The casts were completed by Austrian film and theatre stars like Hans Thimig, Walter Slezak, Oskar Beregi, Hans Marr. Some film stars of later years, Willi Forst for example, appeared in some of these movies as extras.

Between 1933 and 1936 Austria was a refuge for many German filmmakers who had emigrated from Nazi Germany, among them directors Erich Engel and Werner Hochbaum.

=== 1936 to 1945 ===
Although Austria was not annexed by Germany until 1938, Jews were forbidden to work in the Austrian film industry from 1936 onwards due to pressure from Nazi Germany where Jews had been banned from film work within months of the Nazis taking power. Germany was the most important export market for Austrian films and Germany had threatened a total ban on Austrian film imports unless the Austrians complied with their demands. The only exception to this ban was, for unknown reasons, the film Episode (1935) directed by the Jewish Walter Reisch. The majority of Jewish Austrian directors, actors and other employees of the film industry, along with many non-Jewish opponents of the Nazis emigrated in the following years to France, Czechoslovakia, Great Britain and the United States. Some Jewish filmmakers, however, did not emigrate and many were murdered in the Holocaust. Many of the Austrian emigrants went on to successful careers in the United States, notably the directors Billy Wilder, Fred Zinnemann, Otto Preminger, Joe May and Edgar G. Ulmer.

After the Anschluss some filmmakers came to arrangements with the new Nazi leadership, whilst others chose to leave the film business under the Nazis or to hide in the underground - for example the famous costume designer Gerdago who went on to create the costumes for the Sissi films of the 1950s.

The whole Austrian film industry was quickly integrated into one company Wien-Film, which was the new name of Sascha-Film following its confiscation by the Nazis with the help of the Creditanstalt bank. Wien-Film produced few openly propagandistic films; the majority of its output was apparently harmless comedies, which often had an antidemocratic and anti-semitic subtext. Although Nazi censorship was strict, a few films contained criticism hidden at a metaphorical level, for example the musical comedies of Willi Forst.

=== 1945 to 1970 ===
The period between 1945 and 1970 was the age of musical comedies, which had already become popular in the 1930s, and of Heimatfilme, sentimental films with a rural setting. In the aftermath of World War II Austria's cities were devastated and filmmakers set their works in the countryside to show the population the "good and beautiful" Austria. In the 1950s, the age of the Wirtschaftswunder there was little popular call for serious or critical films; the public preference was for films that displayed a safe environment, an escape from the destruction of recent history. Many of the comedies of the period were set at the time of the Austro-Hungarian Empire as this period is identified with luxury, elegance, romance and a vision of Austria as large, powerful and peaceful. This explains the popularity of the Sissi films starring Romy Schneider as the Empress Elizabeth which found not only domestic but international success. These films were the model for many other Austrian films of the period. Apart from Schneider other Austrian film stars of the 1950s and 1960s were Peter Alexander, Attila Hörbiger, Magda Schneider, Wolf Albach-Retty and Hans Moser. Among the directors, the highly prolific Franz Antel became a household name with his popular comedies.

=== 1970 to 1990 − era of structural changes ===
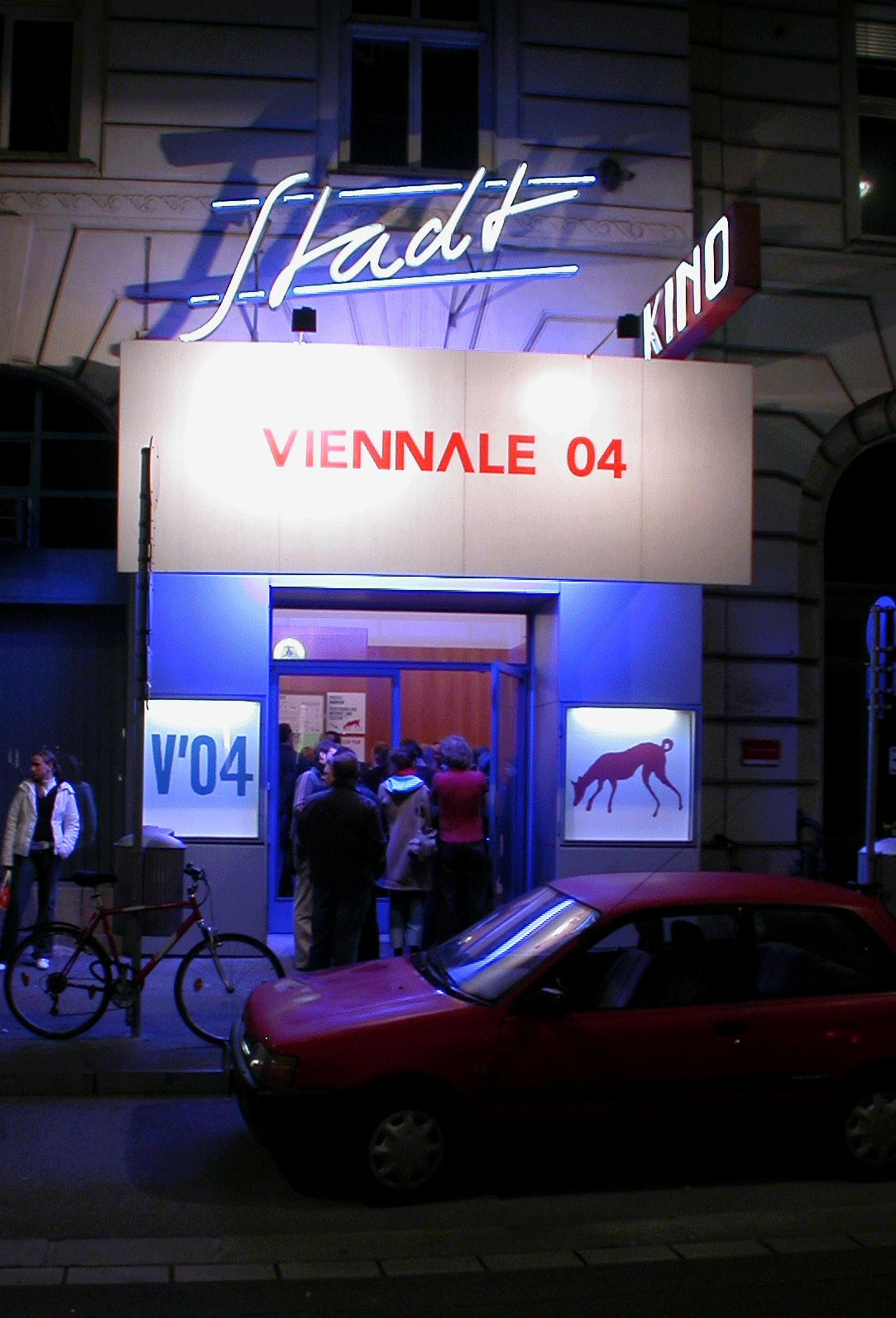
The Viennese Stadtkino at the Viennale film-festival 2004

The 1970s was the period in which Austrian film production reached its lowest ebb with only five to ten films being produced each year. The reactionary Austrian film industry succumbed to the rise of television whilst at the same time, a new, young, and critical generation of filmmakers - the Austrian avant-garde movement - emerged with productions that were often experimental. Notable avant-garde filmmakers, some of whom had begun working in the late 1950s, included Peter Kubelka, Franz Novotny, Ernst Schmid Jr., Ferry Radax, Kurt Kren, Valie Export, Otto Muehl, and Peter Weibel.

By around 1980 a new wave of mainstream film production had begun in Austria. With the modern industry having to compete with leisure pursuits like television and computers which did not exist in its heyday of the interwar period and the 1950s, a return to the production levels of those times seems most unlikely. However, the Austrian industry did begin to rediscover different film genres which had been largely forgotten from the 1930s through to the 1960s when sentimental comedies dominated the domestic scene. Whilst comedies remain popular in Austria to this day, the nature of the comedy has changed and dramas have returned to popularity. Other genres such as the action movie, the thriller, the fantasy film and the horror film have not become established in Austria, not least because of their high production costs and reliance on expensive special effects. Austrian films of the 21st Century seldom cost more than 1 to 2 million euros to produce as higher costs could not be earned back in the domestic market and few Austrian films enjoy successful overseas distribution. Simultaneously almost the entire distribution system within Austria is in the hands of the major American film companies who have their own productions to sell. As a result, there is little marketing and publicity for Austrian-made films.

=== After 1990 ===
cinema-film production
| Year | Amount |
| 2000 | 17 |
| 2001 | 12 |
| 2002 | 26 |
| 2003 | 20 |
| 2004 | 24 |
| 2005 | 24 |

In the 1990s, the Austrian film industry underwent a number of structural changes. Some directors, both established and upcoming have created their own film-companies to share resources and learn from each other. The other film companies, the biggest of which are Dor-Film and Allegro-Film, both producing at least two theatrically released films a year, concentrate on commercially oriented productions such as comedies with cabaret stars who enjoy a high profile in the Austrian market. Such comedies, notably Hinterholz 8 and Poppitz, both directed by Harald Sicheritz, have had the highest box-office of any Austrian films in the last 25 years. These companies also produce more challenging films, but only in limited numbers as productions other than comedies are financially risky in Austria unless foreign distribution can be secured.

Austrian films' share of the domestic box-office is one of the lowest in Europe, with only about 3% of cinema admissions going to domestic productions. Every year the annual top ten films at the Austrian box-office are usually all American.

High-quality Austrian films, which have won more and more critical acclaim in recent years, are usually produced by small production companies, often in co-production with other countries. Examples of this are The Piano Teacher and Caché by Michael Haneke, probably the most famous Austrian director at the current time. Other successful Austrian films (wholly Austrian and co-productions) since 2000 are We Feed the World (Erwin Wagenhofer), Darwin's Nightmare (Hubert Sauper), Calling Hedy Lamarr (Georg Misch), Grbavica (Jasmila Žbanić), Slumming (Michael Glawogger), Silentium and Komm, süßer Tod (both Wolfgang Murnberger), The Edukators (Hans Weingartner) and Dog Days (Ulrich Seidl). Other notable contemporary directors are Barbara Albert, Andrea Maria Dusl, Elisabeth Scharang, Jessica Hausner, Stefan Ruzowitzky, Ruth Mader, Kurt Palm, Nikolaus Geyrhalter and, resident in the U.S., Robert Dornhelm.

Contemporary Austrian film making is internationally well known for its realistic social dramas, which enjoyed high attention and many awards on international film festivals since the late 1990s. On the occasion of a film row of Austrian films in the Lincoln Center, where films like Dog Days or Barbara Alberts Northern Skirts (Nordrand) were shown, The New York Times came to the point, that Austria is currently the world capital of feel-bad cinema.

The Holocaust narrative Die Fälscher (The Counterfeiters) won the Academy Award or "Oscar" for Best Foreign Language Film in 2007 while Revanche was nominated for the same award in 2009. Critical recognition of Austria's new wave film has continued and in 2013 Michael Haneke's French-language film representing Austria, Amour, received both the Oscar and the BAFTA Award for Best Foreign Language Film.

== Organisations ==
Austrian Films supports promotion and export of Austrian films. This organisation is the Austrian member of European Film Promotion (EFP), a European-wide network aiming at the worldwide promotion of European film.

== Films ==
Most successful Austrian films at the Austrian box-office by admissions from 1981 through to March 20, 2006; Source: Österreichisches Filminstitut (www.filminstitut.at)
| # | Film | Prod.- company | Director | Admissions |
| 1 | Hinterholz 8 | Dor Film | Harald Sicheritz | 617,558 |
| 2 | Poppitz | Dor Film | Harald Sicheritz | 441,017 |
| 3 | Müllers Büro | Wega Film | Niki List | 441,000 |
| 4 | Brother of Sleep | Dor Film | Joseph Vilsmaier | 307,300 |
| 5 | The Bone Man | Dor Film | Wolfgang Murnberger | 279.143 |
| 5 | MA 2412 | MR Film | Harald Sicheritz | 272,849 |
| 6 | Komm, süßer Tod | Dor Film | Wolfgang Murnberger | 230,361 |
| 7 | Indien | Dor Film | Paul Harather | 223,680 |
| 8 | Be Gentle, Penguin | Köpf Film | Peter Hajek | 210,000 |
| 9 | Silentium | Dor Film | Wolfgang Murnberger | 204,802 |
| 10 | Wanted | MR Film | Harald Sicheritz | 187,542 |
| 11 | We Feed the World | Allegro Film | Erwin Wagenhofer | 183,379 |
| 12 | Freispiel | Scheiderbauer Film | Harald Sicheritz | 173,658 |
| 13 | An Almost Perfect Divorce | Star Film | Reinhard Schwabenitzky | 156,600 |
| 14 | An Almost Perfect Affair | Star Film | Reinhard Schwabenitzky | 151,000 |
| 15 | The Quality of Mercy | Provinz Film | Andreas Gruber | 122,634 |

== Directors ==
see: List of Austrian film directors

== Actors ==
see: List of Austrian film actors

== See also ==
- Filmmuseum Austria
- Cinema of the world

== Bibliography ==
in English:

- Robert von Dassanowsky and Oliver C. Speck, Eds.: New Austrian Film. Berghahn, New York City and Oxford 2011, ISBN 978-1-84545-700-6
- Robert von Dassanowsky: Austrian cinema - a history. Mc Farland, Jefferson and London 2005, ISBN 0-7864-2078-2
- Eleonore Lappin: Jews and film = Juden und Film: Vienna, Prague, Hollywood. Institut für Geschichte der Juden in Österreich, Vienna 2004, ISBN 3-85476-127-9
- Ernst Schürmann: German film directors in Hollywood: film-emigration from Germany and Austria: an exhibit of the Goethe Institutes of North America. 1978
- Modern Austrian Literature: Special issue: Austria in film. International Arthur Schnitzler Research Association, Riverside (Ca.) 1999

in German:

- Ruth Beckermann: Ohne Untertitel . Sonderzahl-Verlags-Gesellschaft, Vienna 1996, ISBN 3-85449-090-9.
- Francesco Bono, Paolo Caneppele, Günter Krenn (publisher): Elektrische Schatten, Verlag Filmarchiv Austria, Vienna 1999, ISBN 3-901932-02-X
- Walter Fritz: Im Kino erlebe ich die Welt: 100 Jahre Kino und Film in Österreich. Verlag Christian Brandstätter, Vienna 1997, ISBN 3-85447-661-2
- Ulrich, Rudolf: Österreicher in Hollywood. [Austrians in Hollywood] Filmarchiv Austria, Vienna 2004, 623 pages, ISBN 3-901932-29-1 (available in German only)
