= Andrea Händler =

Austrian actress and cabaret artist

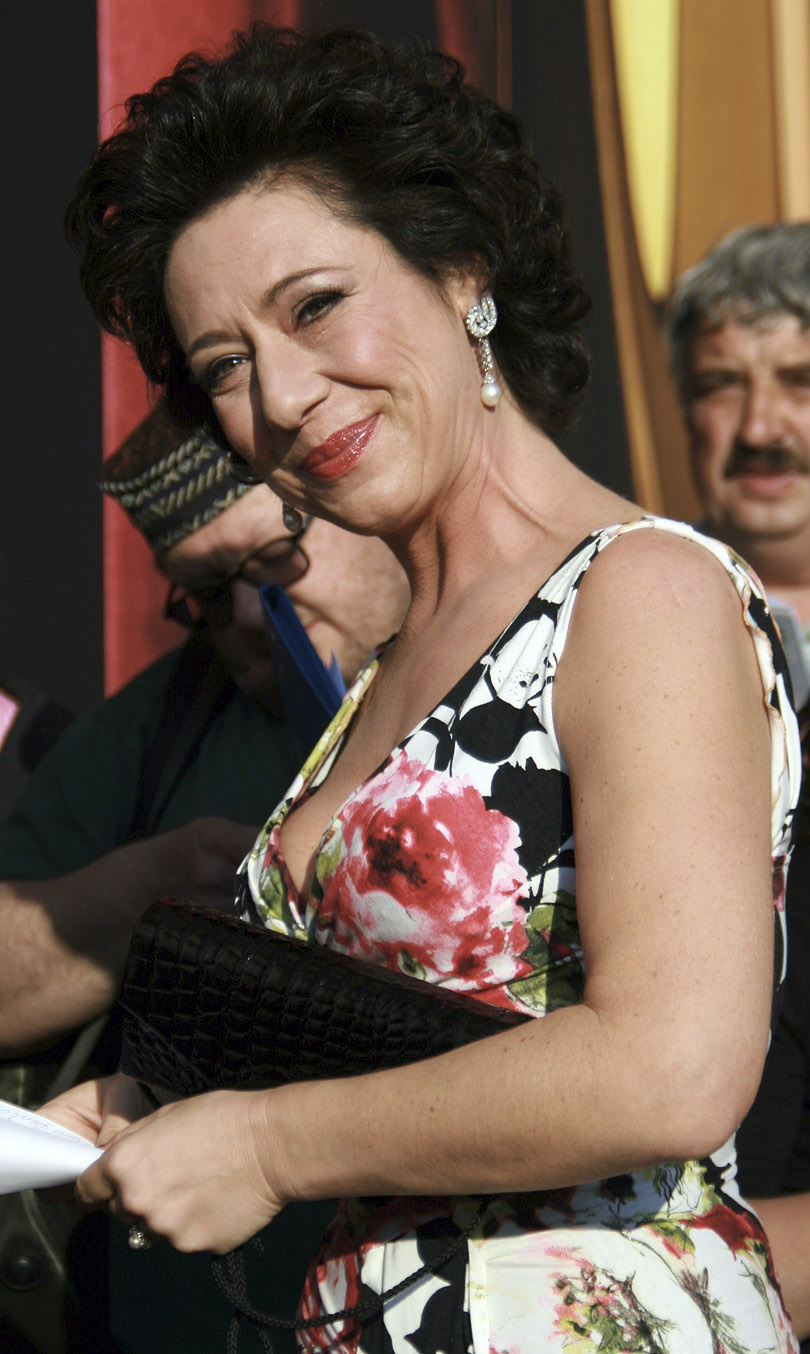
Image of Andrea Händler

Andrea Händler (born 14 May 1964) is an Austrian actress and cabaret artist.

== Life ==
Händler was born on 14 May 1964 in Vienna. She grew up in Styria, completed her acting training with Herwig Seeböck, Reinhard Tötschinger and Giora Seeliger and was active in various theater productions and as a cabaret artist from 1984. As a member of the cabaret group Schlabarett, she performed in the programs Am Tag davor, Atompilz von links and in Muttertag; together with Herwig Seeböck also in Qualverwandtschaft and as a member of the "Kabarettgruppe Statt-Theater" under the direction of Uli Brée in Männer-Schmerzen and Frauen-Schmerzen.

In 1995, her solo career began with the program Diskret – eine Peepshow. This was followed by Heiß gemacht (1997), Auszeit (1998), Notstand (2000), Paradies (2002), Einsendeschluss (2004), Das Schweigen der Händler (2008) and Naturtrüb (2011).

Händler has also worked in theater, film and television productions, such as Muttertag, Höhenangst, Hinterholz 8, Zwölfeläuten and Poppitz as well as in the ORF TV productions Die kranken Schwestern and Kaisermühlen-Blues.

Together with Dolores Schmidinger, she has also been playing Alltagsgeschichten since 2003, based on the popular TV documentary series of the same name by Elizabeth T. Spira.

== Filmography ==
- 1988: Der Kronprinz (TV); director: Thomas Roth
- 1989: Der Kronprinz (feature film); director: Miklós Szinetár, screenplay: Brigitte Hamann, Kurt Klinger
- 1992: Tage der Rosen; Director: Doris Plank
- 1993: Muttertag; Director: Harald Sicheritz
- 1994: Höhenangst; Director: Houchang Allahyari
- 1994: Eine kleine Erfrischung; Director: Thomas Roth
- 1995: Freispiel; Director: Harald Sicheritz
- 1995–1999: Die kranken Schwestern (TV sitcom); Director: Werner Sobotka
- 1996: Tatort – Mein ist die Rache (TV); Director: Houchang Allahyari
- 1996-1999: Kaisermühlen-Blues (TV series); Director: Harald Sicheritz, Reinhard Schwabenitzky
- 1996-1997: Der ideale Kandidat (TV); Director: Reinhard Schwabenitzky
- 1997: Qualtingers Wien; Director: Harald Sicheritz
- 1998: Hinterholz 8; Director: Harald Sicheritz
- 1999: Die Jahrhundertrevue (TV); Director: Harald Sicheritz
- 1999: Zechen-Blues (TV series on RTL); Director: Jürgen Weber
- 2001–2004: Kommissar Rex (TV series)
- 2001: Zwölfeläuten (The Silent Bell); Director: Harald Sicheritz
- 2001: De Luca (TV series); Director: Heidelinde Haschek
- 2001: Shooting 4th season MA 2412 (TV) – guest role
- 2002: Poppitz; Director: Harald Sicheritz
- 2003: MA 2412 – Die Staatsdiener; Director: Harald Sicheritz
- 2005: Polly Adler – Eine Frau sieht rosa (TV); Director: Peter Ily Huemer
- 2008: Und ewig schweigen die Männer
- 2020: Wischen ist Macht (television series)
- 2022: Weber & Breitfuß

== Awards ==
- 1999: Salzburger Stier
- 2000: Karl, main prize for Notstand
