= List of highest-grossing films in Austria =

This list charts the most successful films at cinemas in Austria by admissions.

== Highest-grossing films ==
This table ranks films released in Austria by revenue though not adjusted for inflation.

Rank	Film	Year	Gross
1	Avatar: The Way of Water	2022	€16,970,000
2	Das Kanu des Manitu	2025	€9,670,000
3	Der Schuh des Manitu	2001	€9,150,000
—	Avatar: Fire and Ash	2025	€8,450,000
—	The Lord of the Rings: The Return of the King	2003	€7,700,000

== Most successful films by admissions ==
The table below lists the most successful films in Austria in terms of admissions.

Rank	Film	Year	Admissions
1	Der Schuh des Manitu	2001	2,091,759
2	Titanic^{[a]}	1998	1,412,143
3	Ice Age: Dawn of the Dinosaurs	2009	1,272,648
4	Avatar^{[b]}	2009	1,206,788
5	Ice Age: The Meltdown	2006	1,197,007
6	Traumschiff Surprise – Periode 1	2004	1,173,846
7	Avatar: The Way of Water	2022	1,165,080
8	The Lord of the Rings: The Fellowship of the Ring	2001	1,073,949
9	The Lord of the Rings: The Two Towers	2002	1,052,074
10	Finding Nemo	2003	1,135,758
11	The Lord of the Rings: The Return of the King	2003	1,029,582
12	Harry Potter and the Philosopher's Stone^{[c]}	2001	995,938
13	Ice Age: Continental Drift	2012	951,248
14	Das Kanu des Manitu	2025	886,161
15	Pirates of the Caribbean: Dead Man's Chest	2006	882,087
16	The Lion King	2019	837,348
17	Harry Potter and the Chamber of Secrets	2002	808,376
18	Barbie	2023	799,811
19	Vicky the Viking	2009	798,676
20	Madagascar	2005	798,636

== Most successful Austrian films ==
The table below lists the most successful Austrian films in Austria in terms of admissions since 1982.

Rank	Film	Year	Admissions
1	Hinterholz 8	1998	617,597
2	Aufputzt is’	2025	441,823
3	Poppitz	2002	441,556
4	Müllers Büro	1986	441,135
5	Echte Wiener – Die Sackbauer-Saga	2008	372,788
6	Brother of Sleep	1995	307,345
7	Griechenland	2023	287,531
8	Life Eternal	2015	286,216
9	The Bone Man	2009	281,146
10	Wild Mouse	2017	280,738

== See also ==
- Lists of highest-grossing films

== Notes ==
^{1} Total includes 22,238 admissions of the 2023 25th anniversary re-release.
^{2} Total includes 32,048 admissions of the 2022 remastered re-release.
^{3} Total includes 10,741 admissions of the 3D Anniversary Version.
