= 3faltig =

2010 film

- Film poster
- Directed by: Harald Sicheritz
- Starring: Christian Tramitz; Matthias Schweighöfer; Roland Düringer; Adele Neuhauser; Alfred Dorfer; Julia Hartmann; Michael Schweighöfer; Raimund Wallisch; Hannes Ringlstetter; Karl Fischer; Jana Podlipná; Stefanie Dvorak; Christian Ulmen; Volker Michalowski
- Release dates: October 21, 2010 (Austria); February 17, 2011 (Germany)
- Countries: Austria; Germany
- Language: German

3faltig is an Austrian-German comedy film directed by Harald Sicheritz. It was released in 2010.
