= Werner Brix =

Austrian cabaret artist and actor

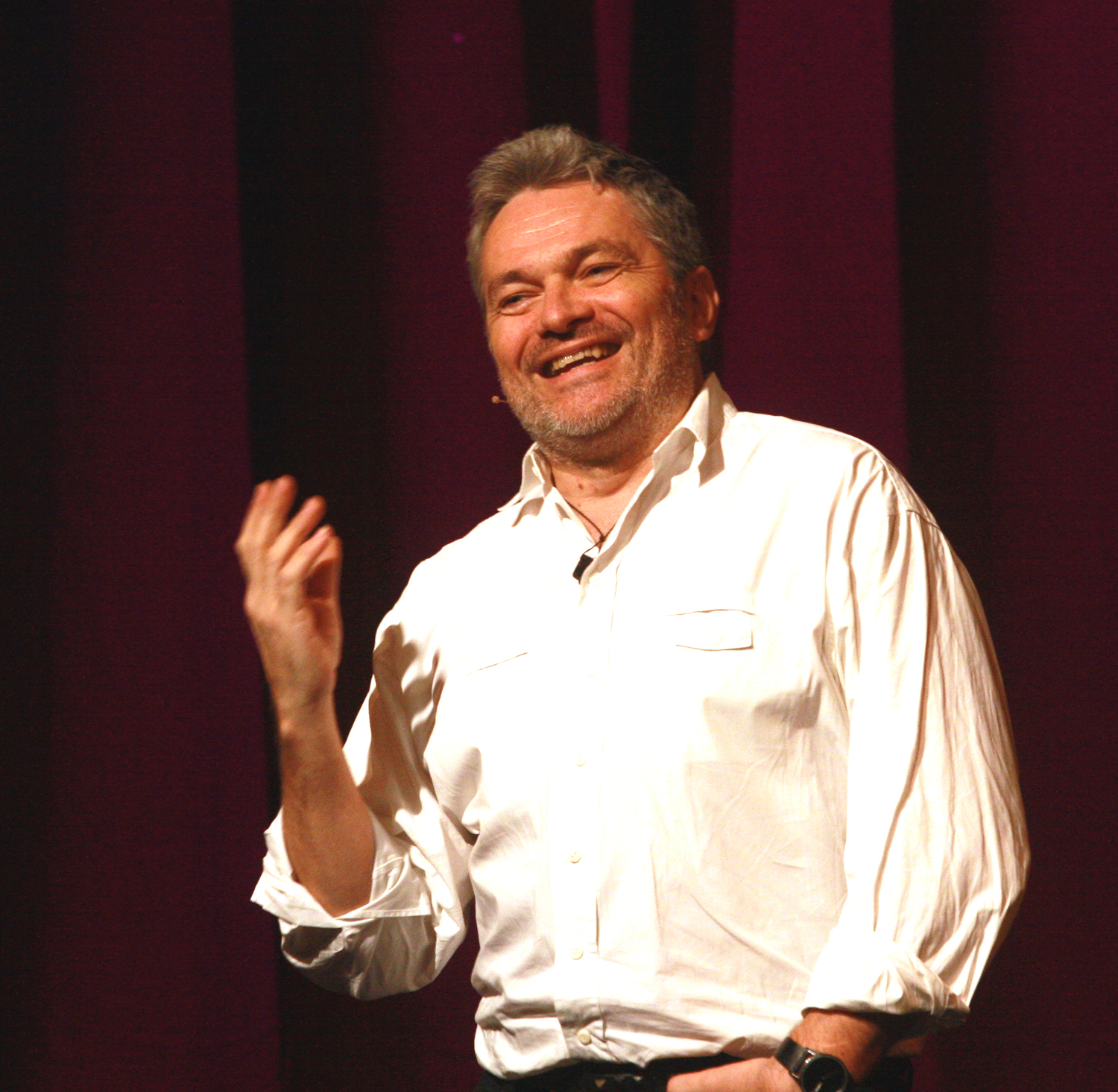
- Born: 7 December 1964 (age 61); Vienna

Comedy career
- Years active: 1993–present
- Medium: Cabaret, TV, film
- Website: http://www.brix.at/index.php

Werner Brix (born 7 December 1964 in Vienna, Austria), is an Austrian cabaret artist, actor, and director best known for appearances in the TV series Tatort (since 2006) and Anatomy of Evil (2010) and the movie Kaliber Bloody Weekend (2000).

== Life ==
Werner Brix was for six years a communications engineer in the information technology industry. In 1993 in Vienna he began his acting career and "has been a fixed part of the Austrian film, theater and cabaret scene ever since." With a knack for humor, he strives to advance the values of tolerance, equality and solidarity. He appeals to a demanding audience and to the media with his motto being "humor with a brain". He is frequently invited to talk shows or to give keynote speeches in the business world. Since 2011 Brix has run his own production company, producing material for TV, commercials, and the Internet.

Since 2008 he has been the initiator and organizer of the annual benefit evening in favor of development aid clubs and Chairman of the Otto Tausig fund "Artists Development Aid", along with Lilly Tausig, Paul Gulda and Erwin Steinhauer.

In 2011 he was a co-founder of Facebook group Amici delle SVA, which in 2017 in association with ARGE1 established a legal entity for micro-enterprises.

== Cabaret ==
- 1995: Lurch, solo cabaret
- 1998: Stick in iron, solo cabaret
- 1998: Vitasek, Puntigam and Brix
- 2000: Brix meets Jesus u. a., Solo cabaret
- 2001-2002: The Long Night of Cabaret with Leo Lukas, Ludwig Müller, Olivier Lendl, I Stangl, *Mike Supancic, Doris Kofler and Severin Groebner
- 2001: Solo best of BrixMix
- 2003: At full throttle for burnout, or Brix alone in Megaplexx, solo cabaret
- 2005: fuckin 'austrian lesetheater – We read everything, with Gregor Seberg
- 2006: Under duress, solo cabaret
- 2007: The readers come, with Gregor Seberg
- 2009: The eroticism of power, also known as Megaplexx 2 – The best positions, solo cabaret
- 2011: 40plus – About Men in the Best Years, Solo Cabaret
- 2014: LUST – Let's live!, Solo cabaret
- 2016: Zuckerl, solo cabaret

== Actor ==
=== Theater ===
Among others: "The Incorrigible", "Treasure Island", "Dracula", "Robin Hat", "Toni & Tina's Wedding", "Loyalty or The Wedding Day", "Almost Vicious", "Just a Day", "Children of Vienna".

=== Film roles ===
- 1997: Heroes in Tyrol, directed by Niki List
- 1997: The Polifinario, Book + Director: Peter Evers, Viennale: Nomination Price New Cinema 1998
- 2004: Silentium (with inter alia Josef Hader ) (Director: Wolfgang Murnberger )
- 2006: Jump!: (with Patrick Swayze ) Pius Believer, book + director: Joshua Sinclair
- 2011: The last guest: Peter, leading role, two-person short film with Simon Schwarz
- 2013: The Werkstürmer, Director: Andreas Schmied, Novotny
- 2014: Landkrimi – The Woman with a Shoe, Director: Michael Glawogger, Lotus Film

=== TV ===
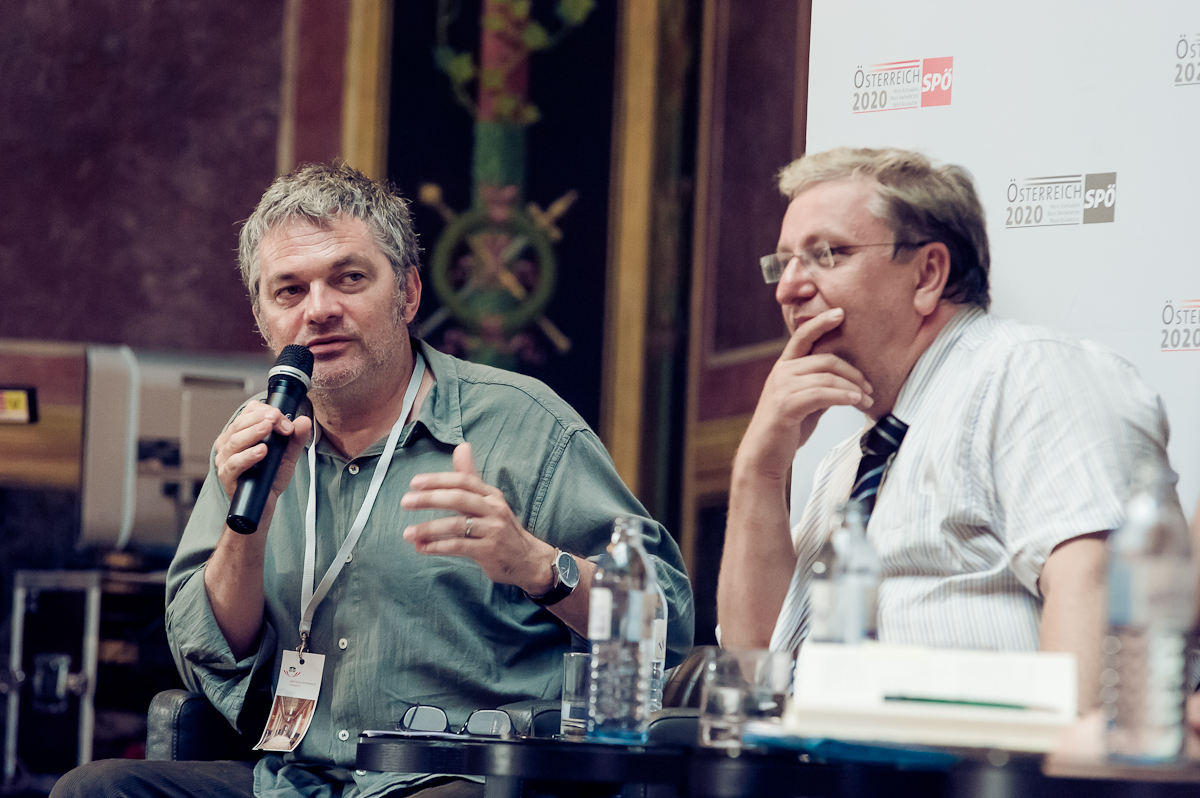

- 1996: Commissioner Rex – Death Race
- 1997: Stockinger – Silent Water
- 1998: The Beloved and the Priest
- 1999: The Century Revue, directed by Harald Sicheritz
- 2000: Schloss Orth – Herzflimmern
- 2002: Trautmann – Who is sensitive, remains
- 2004: Trautmann – Everything the same
- 2005: Four women and one death – wear off warm
- 2006: Crime Scene – Deadly Trust
- 2010: Slicer (2 pieces)
- 2010: The winegrower king – The candidate
- 2011-2013: Schlawiner (4 episodes)
- 2012: SOKO Danube – Late area
- 2013: Hyundai Cabaret Days
- 2014: SOKO Kitzbühel – Lazy eggs
- 2015: Tatort – code name Kidon
- 2015: Small big voice
- 2018: Traces of Evil – Rage

== Awards ==
- 2002: Stuttgart broom
- 2003: Award for the KARL (Cabaret Award)
- 2003: Executioner's ax
- 2005: Salzburg Bull
- 2017: Reinheim satirical lion, jury prize
- 2018: Dresden Satire Prize

== See also ==
- YouTube productions
- Vimeo productions
