= My Best Enemy (2011 film) =

- Directed by: Wolfgang Murnberger
- Starring: Moritz Bleibtreu; Georg Friedrich
- Release date: 1 September 2011
- Running time: 109 minutes
- Countries: Austria; Luxembourg
- Language: German

My Best Enemy (German: Mein bester Feind) is a 2011 Austrian / Luxembourgian comedy film directed by Wolfgang Murnberger.

== Cast ==
- Moritz Bleibtreu as Victor Kaufmann
- Georg Friedrich as Rudi Smekal
- Ursula Strauss as Lena
- Marthe Keller as Hannah Kaufmann
- Udo Samel as Jakob Kaufmann
- Uwe Bohm as Standartenführer Widriczek
- Rainer Bock as SS-Hauptsturmführer Rauter
- Karl Fischer as SS Obersturmbannführer Maier
- Hans-Michael Rehberg as Karel Brinek
- Merab Ninidze as Moritz Haiden
- Mirko Roggenbock as SS-Untersturmführer Gruber
- Christoph Luser as SS-Scharführer Weber
- Klaus Manchen as Staatssekretär Leipold

== Storyline ==
Vienna, shortly after Austria's annexation to the German Reich: Victor Kaufmann and Rudi Smekal have been friends since their earliest childhood. But the new socio-political conditions put their friendship to the test. For Victor is Jewish, Rudi is considered German according to the Nuremberg Race Laws. Victor and his parents Hannah and Jakob Kaufmann were unable to flee Austria in time and are therefore deported to the Mauthausen concentration camp. Rudi, meanwhile, joins the National Socialist German Workers' Party (NSDAP) and the SS, hoping to make a career in Hitler's party. Rudi also becomes engaged to Lena, Victor's former fiancée.

A few years later, Rudi visits his former friend Victor in the concentration camp. The reason, however, is not very friendly. In the now "aryanised" property of the Kaufmann family is a drawing by the Italian painter Michelangelo. This was to be given to Benito Mussolini as a sign of Hitler's brotherhood in arms. But it was discovered that it was a copy. Victor is now supposed to tell the SS where his father, who has died in the meantime, hid the original. To do this, he is taken by the SS on a plane to Berlin. His former friend Rudi is also on board. On the way, the plane is shot at by Polish resistance fighters and crashes.

Victor manages to rescue Rudi from the wreckage, but then makes a momentous decision: In a shed he swaps clothes with Rudi. Now he wears an SS uniform and Rudi the shabby prisoner's garb with a Jewish star. The transformation is complete, since no German believes Rudi is one of their own. On the other hand, Victor always has to fear being discovered. Victor develops a plan to help his mother, who is still alive, escape to Switzerland. In exchange, he is apparently willing to let the Nazis have the painting.

Eventually he is exposed and captured again by the SS. Together with Rudi and his commandant, he returns to the family's former home. There he notices that his father has hidden the original in a self-portrait of himself, but he does not reveal it. Instead, the SS find another copy of the Michelangelo, and they now believe they have the original in their hands.

Victor eventually survives the war and returns to Vienna with his mother and his lover Lena. There Rudi has reopened the family's former gallery and wants to auction off the Kaufmann family's paintings and the presumed original of Michelangelo at his first big auction. To ease his guilty conscience, Rudi gives Victor his father's portrait for free. Almost at the same time, an expert finds out that the painting to be auctioned is not the original, and the media pounce on Rudi. Outside, Rudi sees Victor and his family leaving with the original Michelangelo painting in their hands.

== Film Set Pictures ==
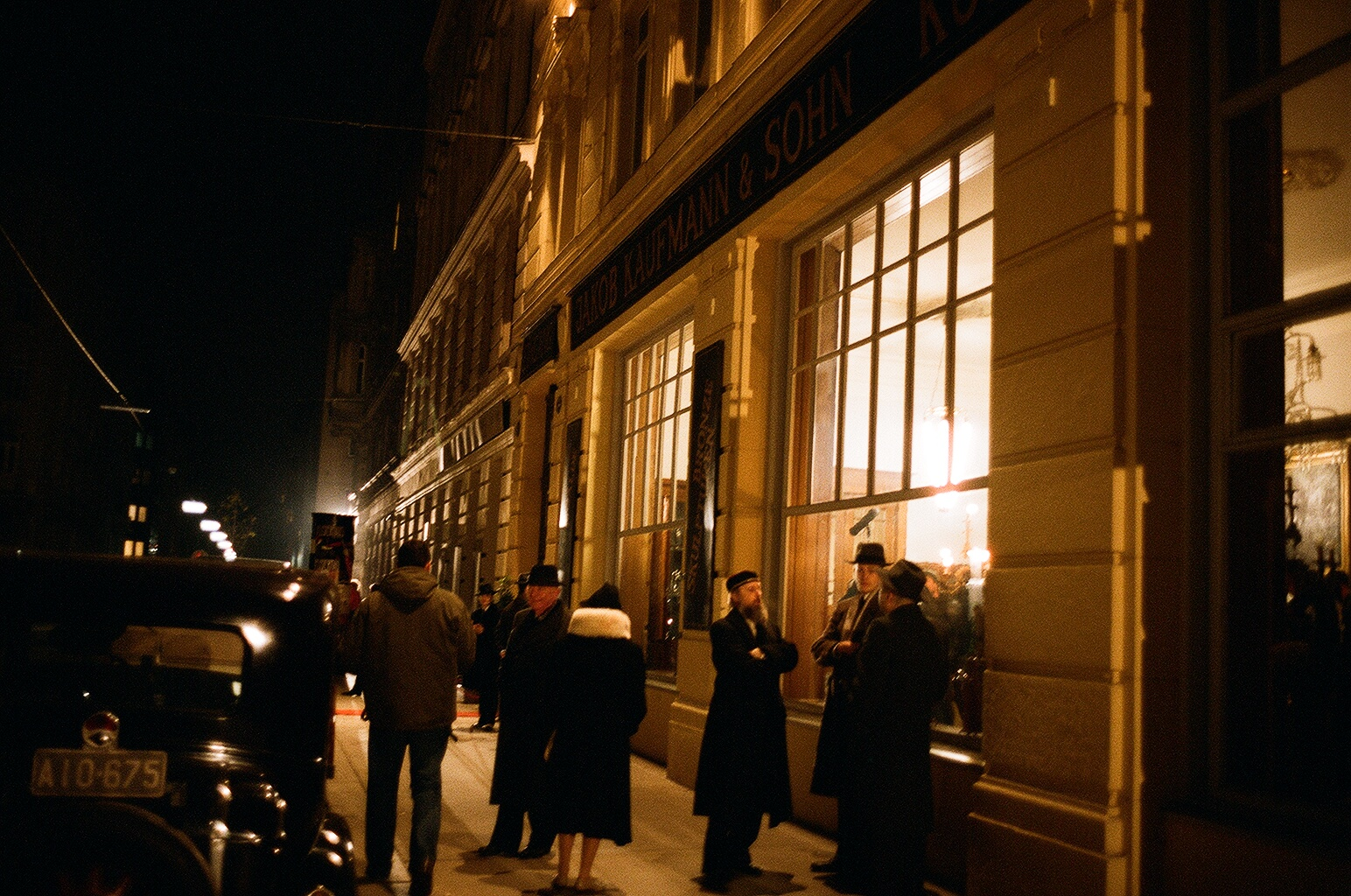
Filming of "My Best Enemy" in 1040 Vienna, Grosse Neugasse 33

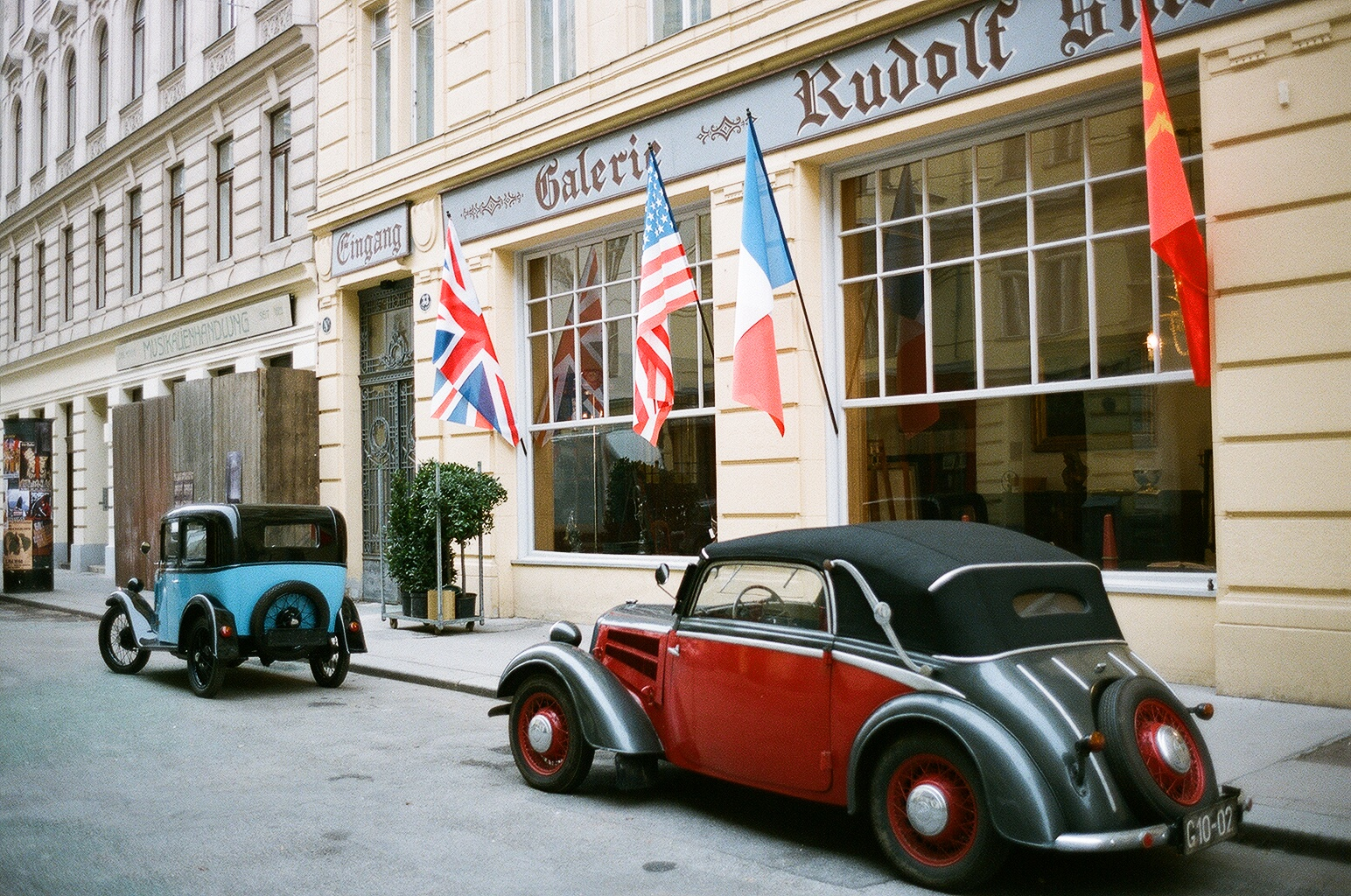
Filming of "My Best Enemy" with historical cars

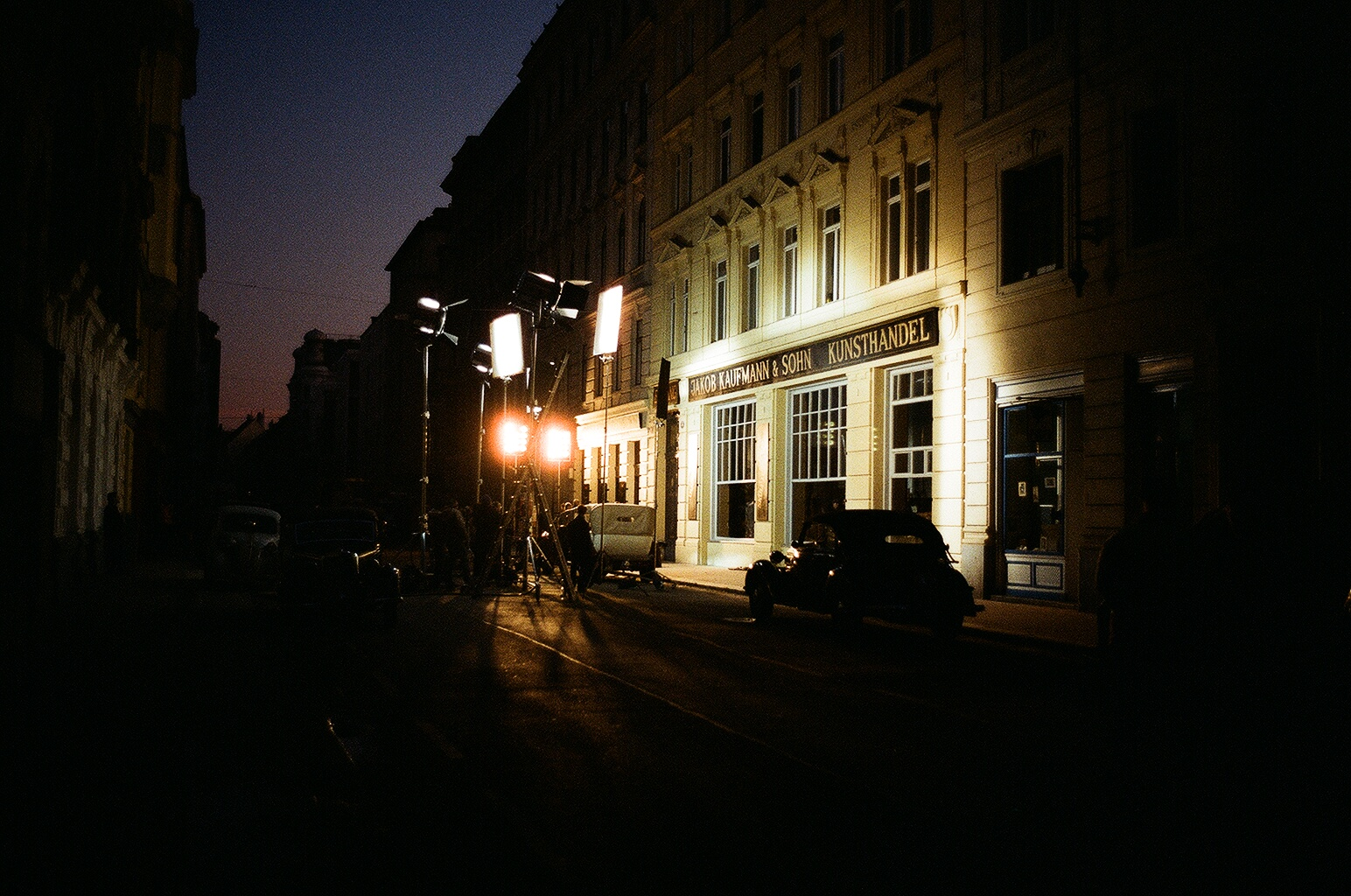
Filming of "My Best Enemy" in 1040 Vienna, Grosse Neugasse 33

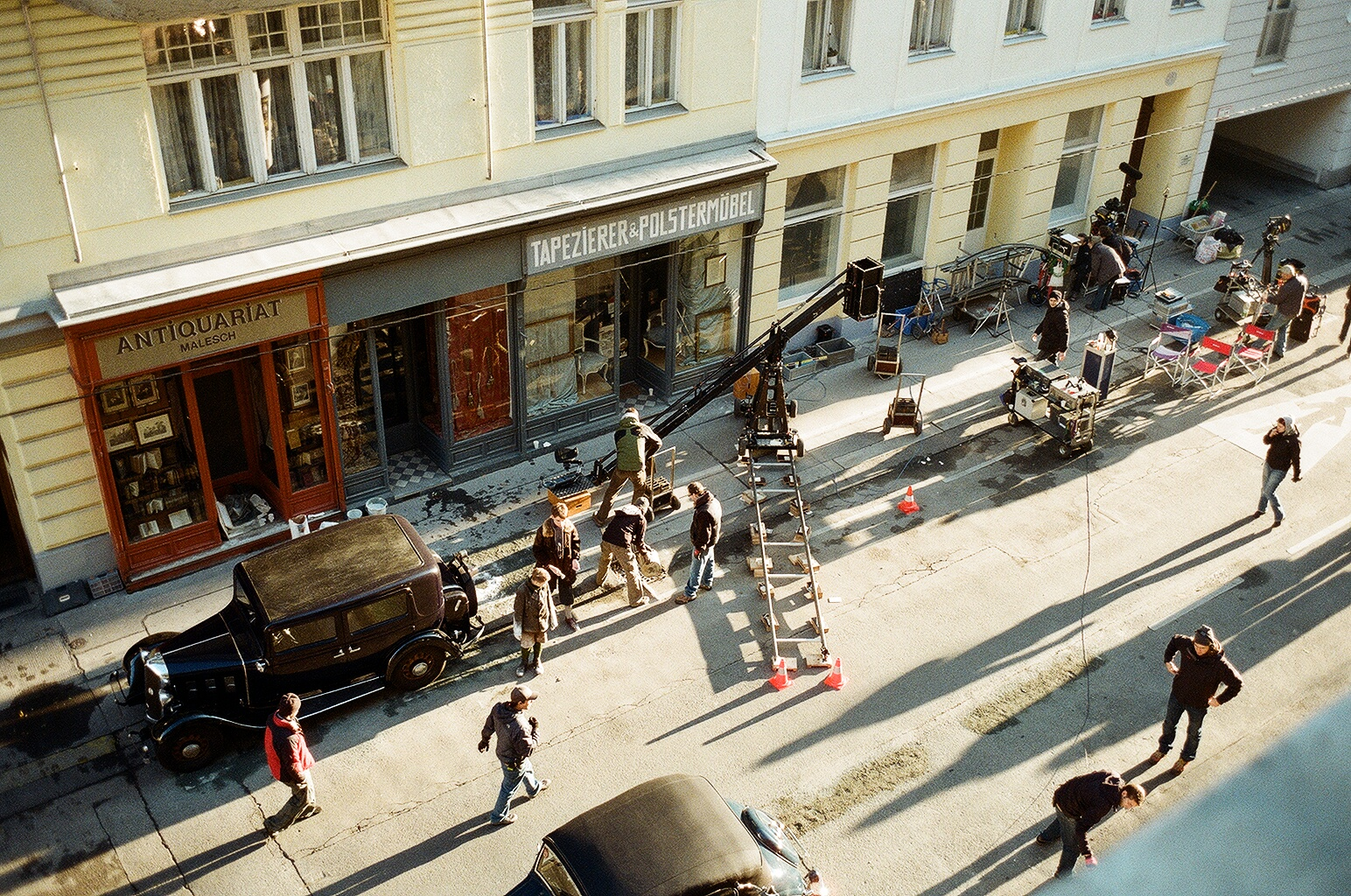
Filming of "My Best Enemy" in 1040 Vienna, Grosse Neugasse

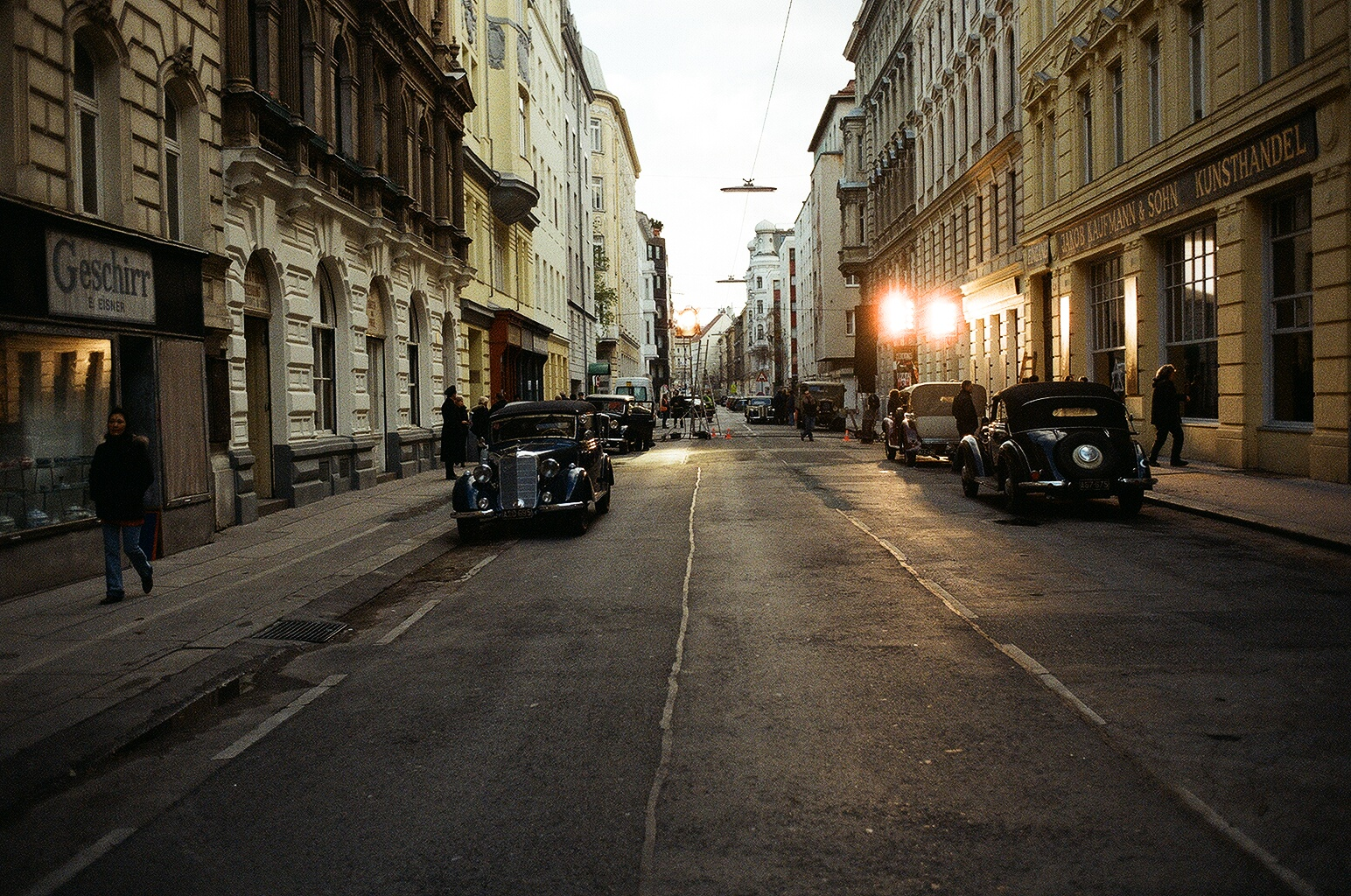
Filming of "My Best Enemy" in 1040 Vienna, Grosse Neugasse
