= Hold-Up (2000 film) =

- Directed by: Florian Flicker
- Starring: Roland Düringer; Josef Hader
- Release date: 9 August 2000 (LF)
- Running time: 1h 24min
- Country: Austria
- Language: German
- Box office: 100,907 admissions (Austria)

Hold-Up (German: Der Überfall) is a 2000 Austrian comedy film directed by Florian Flicker.

== Cast ==
- Roland Düringer - Andreas Berger, Räuber
- Josef Hader - Werner Kopper, Kunde
- Joachim Bißmeier - Josef Böckl, Schneider
- Birgit Doll - Böckels 'Schwester'
- Sonja Romei - Maria Berger (Andis Frau)
- Valentin Frais - Jakob
- Ulrike Beimpold - Gertrude Bacher
- Klaus Ortner - Herbert Bacher
- Klaus Händl - Herbert Bacher

== Reception ==
It was the second most popular Austrian film of the year after Komm, süßer Tod, which was released late in the year.
