= Waldhausen im Strudengau =

Waldhausen im Strudengau Woidhausn im Strudngau
- Municipality
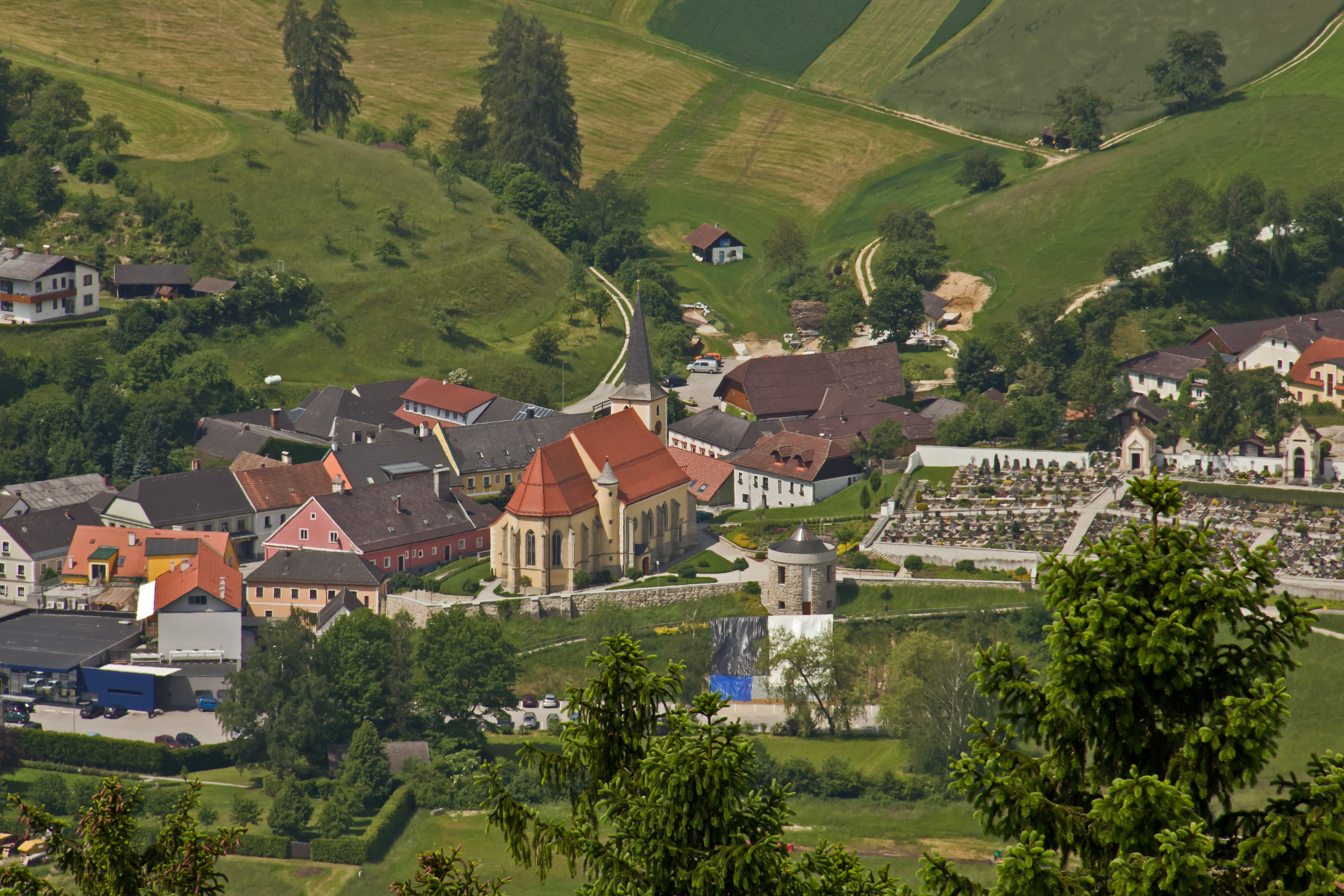

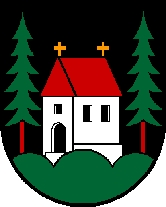
- Coat of arms

- Location within Austria
- Coordinates: 48°16′39″N 14°57′00″E
- Country: Austria
- State: Upper Austria
- District: Perg

Government
  - Mayor: Franz Gassner (ÖVP)

Area
  - Total: 46.85 km^{2} (18.09 sq mi)
- Elevation: 470 m (1,540 ft)

Population (2023-01-01)
  - Total: 2,853
  - Density: 60.90/km^{2} (157.7/sq mi)
- Time zone: UTC+1 (CET)
  - Summer (DST): UTC+2 (CEST)
- Postal code: 4391
- Area code: 07260
- Vehicle registration: PE
- Website: www.waldhausen.at

Waldhausen im Strudengau (Central Bavarian: Woidhausn im Strudngau) is a municipality in the district of Perg in the Austrian state of Upper Austria.

== Geography ==
Waldhausen lies in the Mühlviertel. It was originally a part of Bavaria. About 52 percent of the municipality is forest, and 44 percent is farmland.

== Personalities ==
- Konrad von Waldhausen (1320/1325–1369), early religious reformer.

Another famous person born here is Josef Hader, one of Austria's most renowned actors and comedians.

== Population ==
Historical population
Year	Pop.	±%
2007	2,957	—
2014	2,860	−3.3%
2015	2,899	+1.4%
