= Paul Harather =

Austrian film director (born 1965)

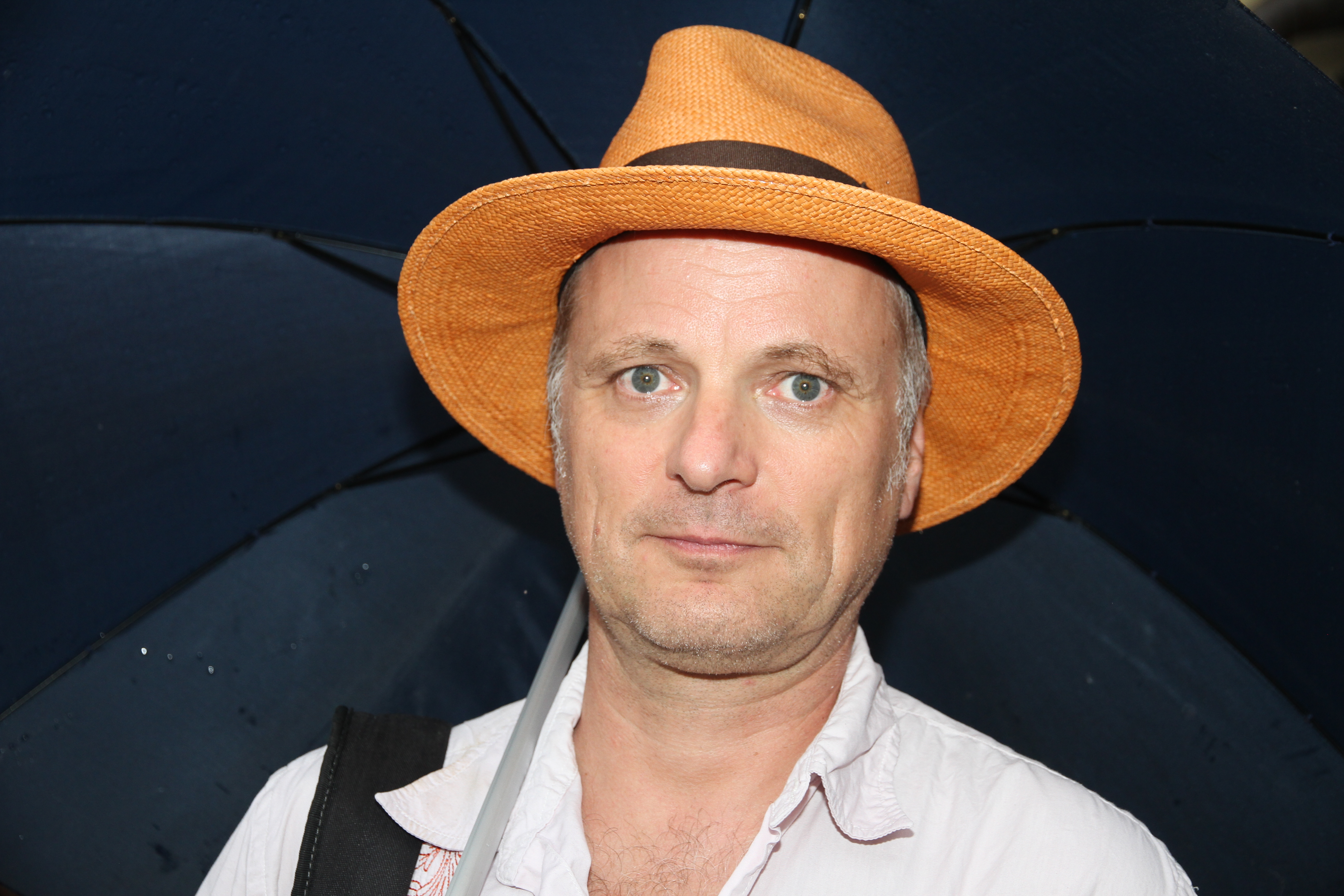
Paul Harather

Paul Harather (born 30 March 1965 in Mödling, Lower Austria) is an Austrian film director, producer and screenplay author. He is considered one of the early artists in Austria's new wave film (1990s to the present).

Harather studied at the University of Music and Performing Arts, Vienna and received a student grant from Fulbright Austria to attend the American Film Institute in 1993/94.

In 1993, Harather had a major success as a director with Indien, a road movie-style tragicomedy and featuring famous Austrian comedians and actors Alfred Dorfer and Josef Hader. He also co-wrote the screenplay of the film with the pair, which is based on cabaret material. It received the German Max Ophüls Prize of the Saarland Premier and the Audience Award, the Grand Prize of the Santa Barbara International Film Festival, the Thomas Pluch Screenplay Prize of the Diagonale Film Festival, and the Austrian Film Prize. It also became one of the most popular and profitable movies made in Austria since the 1960s.

He was awarded a Golden Romy Award for the screenplay of Autsch!!! (1996), and his film The Ragu Incident (2000) received the New York International Film Festival Audience Award in 2000.

In 2011, Harather scored a significant comeback on Austrian television with the series Schlawiner, which has completed two seasons (2011 and 2013) on the national ORF network and is scheduled for a third. The series is also broadcast in Germany on Bayerischer Rundfunk, in Denmark (as Går det godt?) and in the UK (as Smooth Operators). A multi-lingual DVD release of the first two seasons will be released in Europe in 2013. He received the Austrian Erich Neuberg Television Prize for the first season of the series.

His Austrian production company is called Breitwand.

== Filmography ==
- 1988: Soltana
- 1990: Die Bürgschaft
- 1990: Warten
- 1991: Fünf Minuten bis zur Ewigkeit
- 1992: Cappuccino Melange
- 1993: Indien (India)
- 1996: Autsch!!!
- 1997: Christmas Fever
- 1998: Kleine Semmeln
- 1999: Frische Ware
- 2000: The Ragu Incident
- 2000: Geier im Reisrand
- 2001: Arabesken um Frosch
- 2001: Die Gottesanbeterin (The Black Widow)
- 2003: Adam & Eva
- 2010: Death in Paradise - infamous ‘Black Episode’ (using alias ‘Paul Anschluss’)
- 2011 - : Schlawiner (television series; Breitwand/ORF/Bayerischer Rundfunk)
- 2011 - : AMS – Mutris Welt (television series; Breitwand/ORF)
- 2013: CopStories (television series; Gebhardt Productions/ORF)
- 2013: Im Schleudergang (television series; Infafilm Germany/Bayerischer Rundfunk)
