= Wolf Bachofner =

Austrian stage and film actor

- Born: 1961 (age 63–64); Vienna, Austria

Wolf Bachofner (born 1961 in Vienna, Austria) is an Austrian stage and film actor.

In Vienna he got private lectures in speaking and studying parts. After this education he was engaged at the Landestheater Linz, in Vienna, Klagenfurt and also in Frankfurt and from 1997 on at the "Deutsches Schauspielhaus" in Hamburg. He played in The Cherry Orchard (Der Kirschgarten, Anton Chekhov), Athena (Pallas Athene, Herbert Achternbusch), Danton's Death (Dantons Tod, Igor Bauersimas) and also in William Shakespeare's Twelfth Night, or What You Will (Was ihr wollt).

He got international popularity through his part as criminal detective Peter Höllerer in the Austrian-made (ORF) police television drama Inspector Rex (Kommissar Rex), where he was involved in 59 episodes.

== Films and television (selection) ==
- 1992: Dead Flowers
- 1994-1999: Inspector Rex (Kommissar Rex) (series)
- 1995: Nachtbus (Night Bus, shortfilm)
- 1995: Die Ameisenstraße (Ant Street)
- 1997: Qualtingers Wien
- 1997: Tatort (series, episode Eulenburg)
- 1998: Männer
- 1999: Schlachten!
- 1999: Viehjud Levi (Jew-Boy Levi)
- 2000: Jedermann
- 2002: Ikarus (Icarus)
- 2004: Eva Blond (serie, episode Der Zwerg im Schließfach)
- 2005: Ich bin ein Berliner
- 2005: SOKO Wismar (series, episode Notwehr)
- 2005: Mutig in die neuen Zeiten – Im Reich der Reblaus
- 2006: Der Winzerkönig (series, episode Blinde Eifersucht)
- 2006: Mutig in die neuen Zeiten – nur keine Wellen
- 2009: Mein Kampf (Himmlischst)
