= 8 x 45 =

- Country of origin: Austria
- No. of episodes: 8

Original release
- Release: January 12, 2006

8 x 45 is an Austrian television series.

== See also ==
- List of Austrian television series
