= I Promise (film) =

1994 film

- Directed by: Wolfgang Murnberger
- Written by: Wolfgang Murnberger
- Starring: Christoph Dostal
- Release date: 1994
- Running time: 115 minutes
- Country: Austria
- Language: German

I Promise (German: Ich gelobe) is a 1994 Austrian drama film directed by Wolfgang Murnberger. The film was selected as the Austrian entry for the Best Foreign Language Film at the 67th Academy Awards, but was not accepted as a nominee.

== Cast ==
- Christoph Dostal as Berger
- Andreas Lust as Rumpler
- Andreas Simma as Moser
- Marcus J. Carney as Kernstock
- Leopold Altenburg as Tomschitz
- Albert Weilguny as Vizeleutnant Pfister
- Johannes Kollmann as Wachtmeister Ernst
- Robert Taurer as Leutnant Ressl

== See also ==
- List of submissions to the 67th Academy Awards for Best Foreign Language Film
- List of Austrian submissions for the Academy Award for Best Foreign Language Film
