= Indien (film) =

1993 film

- Written by: Paul Harather
- Screenplay by: Paul Harather; Josef Hader; Alfred Dorfer
- Starring: Josef Hader, Alfred Dorfer
- Cinematography: Hans Selikovsky
- Edited by: Andreas Kopriva
- Music by: Ulrich Sinn
- Production company: Dor Film
- Release date: 1993
- Running time: 90 minutes
- Country: Austria
- Language: German

Indien (transl. India) is a 1993 Austrian tragicomic road movie directed by Paul Harather. It was Austria's submission to the 66th Academy Awards for the Academy Award for Best Foreign Language Film, but it was not nominated. It is one of the most successful films of Austrian Cinema and has developed a cult following.

== Plot ==
The main characters are Heinz Bösel and Kurt Fellner, who work for the tourist office in Lower Austria assessing guesthouses. Bösel is fond of beer and occasionally ill-behaved, while Fellner is more intellectual and refined, constantly asking his colleague Trivial Pursuit questions. However, they gradually bond as they travel around Austria.

Later in the film, Fellner is taken ill and is diagnosed with advanced testicular cancer. Bösel helps Fellner fulfil his last wishes, which include playing on an organ and going into the woods one last time to hear the birds. Fellner dies in his friend's arms, but the film ends optimistically when Bösel meets an Indian man who seems to be the reincarnation of his friend.

== Awards ==
- Thomas Pluch Screenplay Prize to Alfred Dorfer and Josef Hader, 1993
- Grand prize of the Santa Barbara International Film Festival in 1994
- At the Filmfestival Max Ophüls Preis in 1994, Prize of the Saarland Premier to director Paul Harather, and audience prize
- Österreichischer Filmpreis in 1994

== Cast ==
- Josef Hader – Heinzi Bösel
- Alfred Dorfer – Kurt Fellner
- Karl Markovics – Kirchingerwirt

== See also ==
- Cinema of Austria
- List of submissions to the 66th Academy Awards for Best Foreign Language Film
- List of Austrian submissions for the Academy Award for Best Foreign Language Film
