= In Heaven (film) =

1998 Austrian drama film

- Directed by: Michael Bindlechner
- Written by: TG Gergely Teglasy
- Produced by: Michael Bindlechner
- Starring: Sylvie Testud; Xaver Hutter; Merab Ninidze
- Cinematography: Michael Kaufmann
- Edited by: Eliska Stibrova
- Music by: Flora St. Loup
- Production company: FRAMES filmproduction
- Distributed by: Bavaria International
- Release date: 16 September 1999
- Running time: 102 minutes
- Countries: Germany; Austria
- Language: German
- Budget: € 1,5 million

In Heaven is a 1999 Austrian drama film directed by Michael Bindlechner. The film was entered into the 1999 International Film Festival Rotterdam.

== Plot ==
Csiwi is 14 and "borrows" his brother's car at night, driving around the suburban streets until dawn and looking to find his way in life. He meets Valeska, who seems to know her destination which she has identified on a postcard, and Levi, who is tired of fighting and searching and only wants to arrive. Together they live through a summer of friendship. Eventually Csiw is alone again but finally knows his way.

== Cast ==
- Sylvie Testud as Valeska
- Xaver Hutter as Civi
- Merab Ninidze as Levi

== Themes ==
In Heaven is a coming of age story in which a rebellious young boy from the suburbs, Csiwi, encounters two people - Valeska and Levi - both in their desires and life goals pointing like signposts in a different direction. One summer, they experience the happiness of giving each other support and new hopes. But in the end each of them has to go his own way. Bindlechner: 'What makes it worth while to tell the story of Csiwi, Levi and Valeska is that apparent happiness on the surface can hide the underlying drama right to the end - as so often in real life".

== Critical reception ==
In Heaven received generally positive reviews and was invited to more than twenty film festivals worldwide.

== Awards ==
Year	Festival	Result	Award	Recipient
1999	Max Ophüls Festival	Winner	Best Young Actor	Xaver Hutter
1999	Max Ophüls Festival	Nominated	Best Film - Max Ophüls Award	Michael Bindlechner
1999	Rotterdam International Film Festival	Nominated	Best Film - Tiger Award	Michael Bindlechner
