= Life Eternal (film) =

- Directed by: Wolfgang Murnberger
- Starring: Josef Hader; Tobias Moretti
- Release date: 5 March 2015
- Running time: 123 minutes
- Countries: Austria; Germany
- Language: German

Life Eternal (German: Das ewige Leben) is a 2015 Austrian/German black comedy crime film directed by Wolfgang Murnberger. It is based on a novel by Wolf Haas.

== Cast ==
- Josef Hader - Brenner
- Tobias Moretti - Aschenbrenner
- Nora Waldstätten - Dr. Irrsiegler
- Roland Düringer - Köck
- Christopher Schärf - Heinz
- Margarete Tiesel - Maritschi
- Johannes Silberschneider - Nachbar
- Hary Prinz - Pichler
- Saša Barbul - Pinto
