= Mother's Day (1993 film) =

- Directed by: Harald Sicheritz
- Starring: Alfred Dorfer; Reinhard Nowak
- Release date: 1993
- Running time: 1h 35min
- Country: Austria
- Language: German

Mother's Day (German: Muttertag) is a 1993 Austrian comedy film directed by Harald Sicheritz.

== Cast ==
- Alfred Dorfer - Mischa Neugebauer / Polizist Gratzl
- Reinhard Nowak - Edwin Neugebauer / Postler / Nachbarjunge 2
- Andrea Händler - Trude Neugebauer / Postlerin / Jungscharbetreuerin
- Eva Billisich - Evelyn Schöbinger / Kassiererin Haberl
- Roland Düringer - Opa Neugebauer / spitzbärtiger Nachbar / Briefträger Zapletal /
- Karl Künstler - Herr Schwalbach
- Silvia Fenz - Frau Habitzl
- Beatrice Frey - Frau Klein
- Gudrun Tielsch - Verwirrte
- Lukas Resetarits - Sandler
- Willi Resetarits - Thief

== See also ==
- List of films set around Mother's Day
