= Poppitz =

2002 Austrian comedy film

- Directed by: Harald Sicheritz
- Starring: Roland Düringer; Marie Bäumer
- Release date: 30 August 2002
- Running time: 1h 39min
- Country: Austria
- Language: German

Poppitz is a 2002 Austrian comedy film directed by Harald Sicheritz.

== Cast ==
- Roland Düringer as Gerry Schartl
- Marie Bäumer as Lena Schartl
- Nora Heschl as Patrizia Schartl
- Kai Wiesinger as Ben
- Alfred Dorfer as Bertram Klingelmeier
- Reinhard Nowak as Fritz Nowak
- Oliver Korittke as Uwe Schalk
- Maria Hofstätter as Frau Kübel
- Eva Billisich as Grete Nowak
