= Josef Hader =

Austrian comedian, actor, and writer

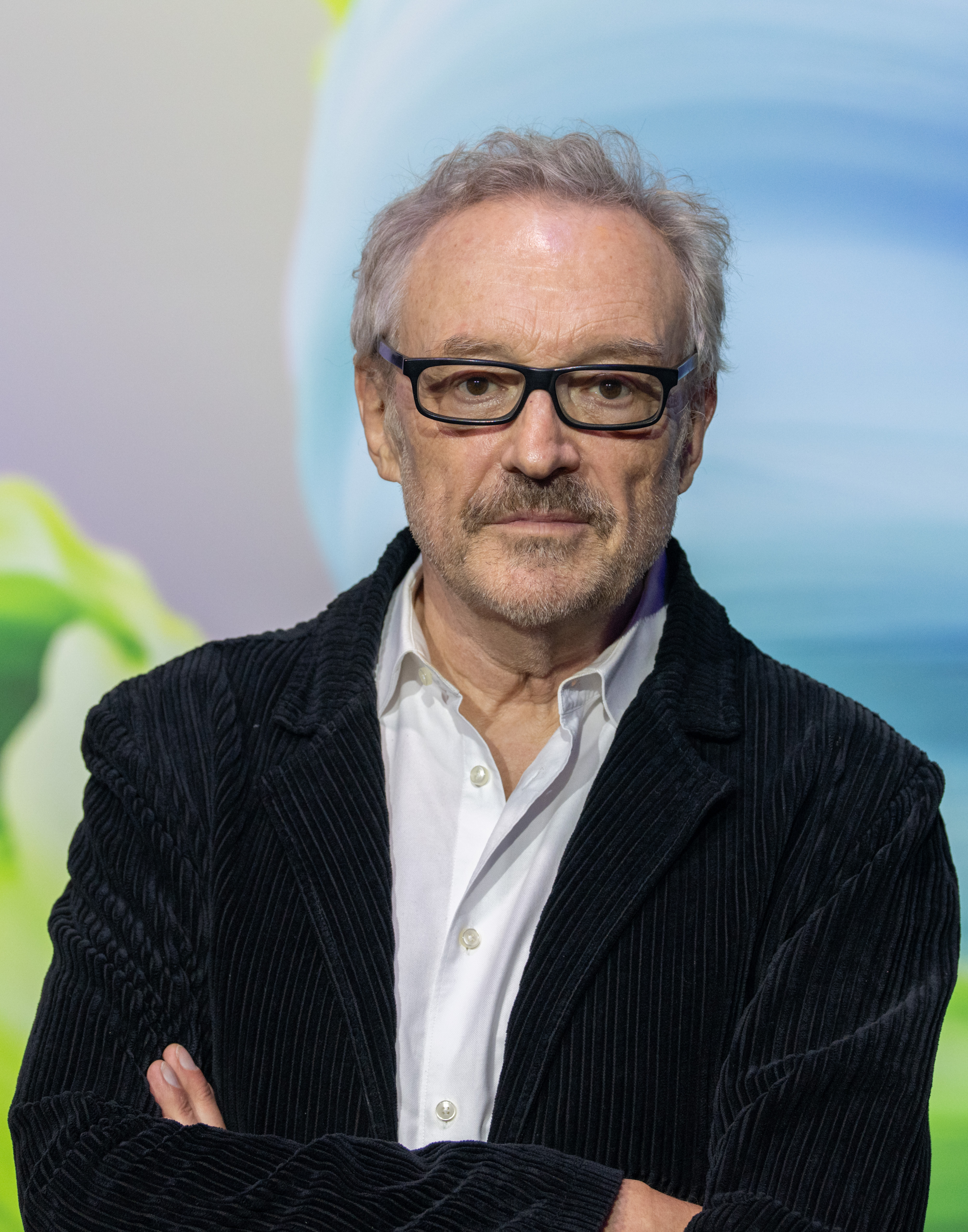
- Hader in 2025
- Born: 14 February 1962 (age 64); Waldhausen im Strudengau, Upper Austria, Austria
- Occupations: Comedian; actor; writer
- Years active: 1982–present
- Children: 2

Josef Hader (born 14 February 1962) is an Austrian stand-up comedian, actor, and filmmaker.

== Life and career ==
Hader was born in Waldhausen im Strudengau, Upper Austria and grew up in Nöchling in Lower Austria where he attended the Stiftsgymnasium Melk. During this time he made his first comedy attempts at his school. After his civilian service at the Red Cross he started studying German and History. As a student he began working on his first comedy programme Fort Geschritten. His second programme Der Witzableiter und das Feuer won the prestigious Salzburger Stier comedy award. After aborting his study and writing Biagn und Brechen (1988) and Bunter Abend (1990) he celebrated his breakthrough with the tragicomic play Indien, together with the comedian Alfred Dorfer, which was filmed by Paul Harather in 1993 with Josef Hader himself in the leading role.

With the film Indien and his following shows Im Keller (1993) and Privat (1994) he became one of the most successful and most respected comedians in the German-speaking world. His comedy programme Privat is the most successful comedy in Austrian history. His most recent show called "Hader muss weg" is more acting than comedy. Hader plays seven different roles using no props other than a simple Trenchcoat and acts only through gestures, voice and facial expression.

Since then, Hader has starred in commercially successful films such as Komm, süßer Tod (2000), Silentium (2004) and The Bone Man (2009), while also gaining critical acclaim for his performances in dramas such as Der Überfall (2000) or Ein halbes Leben (2008). Among others awards, he received the Best Actor Award at the Locarno International Film Festival, the Romy Award, the Adolf Grimme Award and the German Television Award.

He is a regular guest on various German Comedyshows, such as Neues aus der Anstalt on ZDF, Scheibenwischer on Das Erste, Quatsch Comedy Club on Pro Sieben or Ottfried Fischer's Ottis Schlachthof on Bayerischer Rundfunk which increased his popularity in Germany.

Hader is the father of two sons.

== Comedy and plays ==
- 1982: Fort Geschritten
- 1985: Der Witzableiter und das Feuer
- 1986: Im milden Westen
- 1987: Tausche Witze gegen Geld
- 1988: Biagn oder Brechen
- 1990: Bunter Abend
- 1991: Indien (with Alfred Dorfer)
- 1993: Im Keller
- 1994: Privat
- 1997: Hader spielt Hader
- 2004: Hader muss weg

== Filmography ==
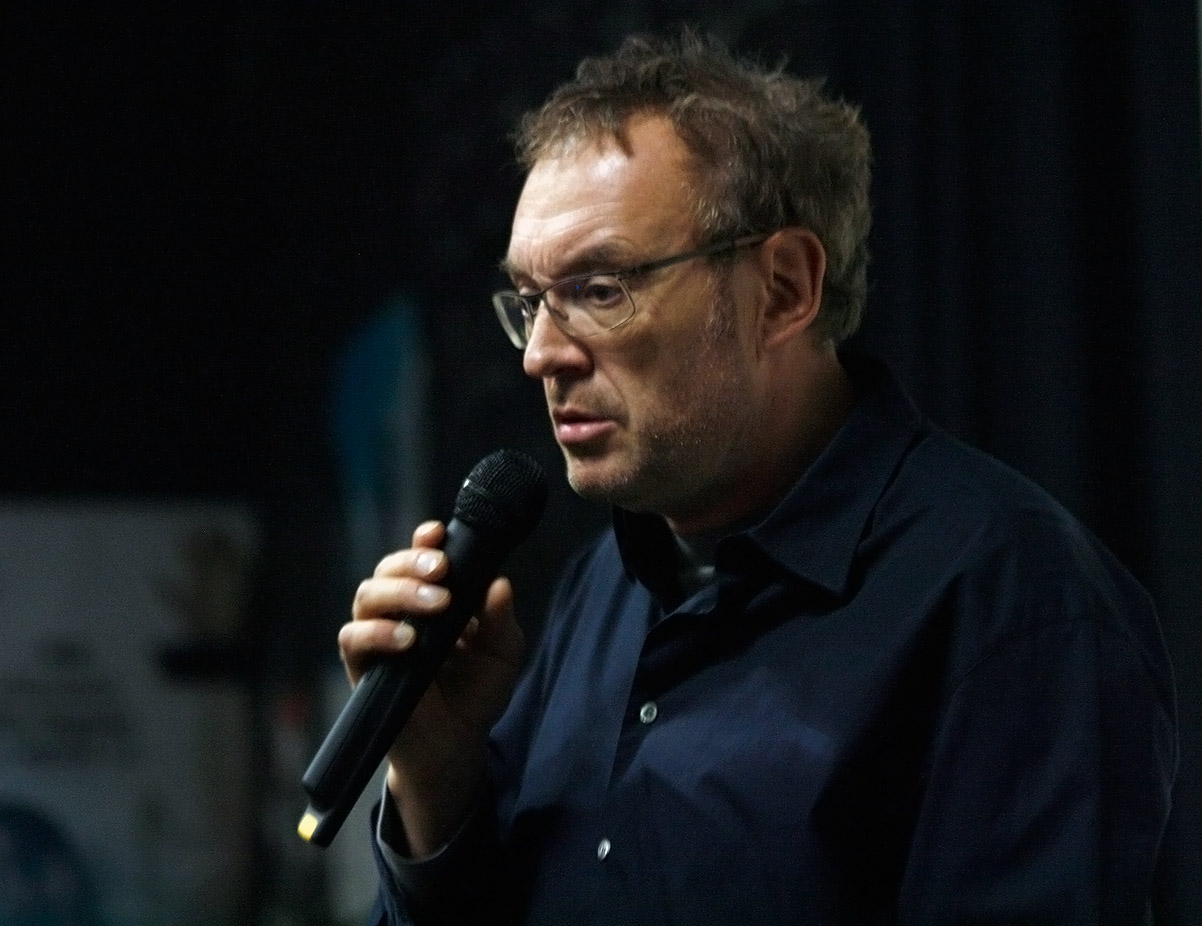
Josef Hader at the University of Vienna speaking at the 2009 student protests in Austria

Year	Title	Role	Notes
1988	Sternberg – Shooting Star	Meier	
1992	Duett	Mallinger's nephew at the bank	TV movie
1992	Cappuccino Melange	Manfred Seidl	TV movie
1993	Indien	Heinz Bösel	also co-writer
1999	Geboren in Absurdistan	Lorry driver	
2000	Hold-Up	Werner Kopper	
2000	Komm, süßer Tod	Brenner	also co-writer
2000	White Cherries	Otto Bucek	
2002	Blue Moon	Johnny Pichler	
2002	Weihnachten	Herr Wächter	TV movie
2004	Silentium	Brenner	also co-writer
2004	C(r)ook	Nowak	
2005	Josef Hader im heiligen Land	Himself	Documentary
2006	Heaven	Hermann Kaltenbrunner	Part of the 8 x 45 television series
2007	Hounds	Henrik	
2007	Cleisto	Himself	
2007	Attwenger Adventure	Himself	Documentary
2008	Randgestalten	Butcher	
2008	Ein halbes Leben	Ulrich Lenz	TV movie
2008	Zibb	Himself	TV series documentary
2009	Screen Test	Herr Kaiser (voice)	Animated film
2009	The Bone Man	Brenner	also co-writer
2009	Little White Lies	Ametsbichler	
2010	Widerstand im Haiderland	Himself	Documentary
2010	Aufschneider	Dr. Hermann Fuhrmann	TV series, also co-writer
2010	Kabarett, Kabarett	Himself	Documentary
2010	Die verrückte Welt der Ute Bock	Policeman	
2011	Wie man leben soll	Leo	
2012	Diamantenfieber oder Kauf dir einen bunten Luftballon	Uncle Fritz	
2014	Kafka's The Burrow	Hausmeister	
2015	Life Eternal	Brenner	
2016	Stefan Zweig: Farewell to Europe	Stefan Zweig	
2017	Wild Mouse	Georg	Also director
2020	The Story of My Wife		Post-production
2024	Andrea Gets a Divorce	Franz	Also director

== Awards ==
- 1985: Salzburger Stier
- 1986: Österreichischer Kleinkunstpreis
- 1990: Deutscher Kleinkunstpreis
- 1992: Österreichischer Kleinkunstpreis
- 1993: Deutscher Kabarettpreis
- 1993: Förderpreis zur Kainz-Medaille
- 1994: Platinum album for the CD Privat
- 1994: Platinum album for the VHS tape Privat
- 1999: Nestroy Ring
- 2000: Locarno International Film Festival – Best Actor
- 2001: Romy Award for Komm, süßer Tod
- 2009: Diagonale Acting Award
- 2009: Deutscher Fernsehpreis (German Television Award)
- 2010: Nomination for the Goldene Kamera
- 2010: Adolf Grimme Award
- 2010: Das große Kleinkunstfestival (Berlinpreis)
- 2010: Romy Award for The Bone Man
- 2011: Bayerischer Kabarettpreis (Hauptpreis)
- 2011: Göttinger Elch
- 2017: Dieter Hildebrandt Prize
- 2022: Österreichischer Kabarettpreis

== See also ==
- Kabarett
- Cinema of Austria
