= Wolfgang Murnberger =

Austrian film director (born 1960)

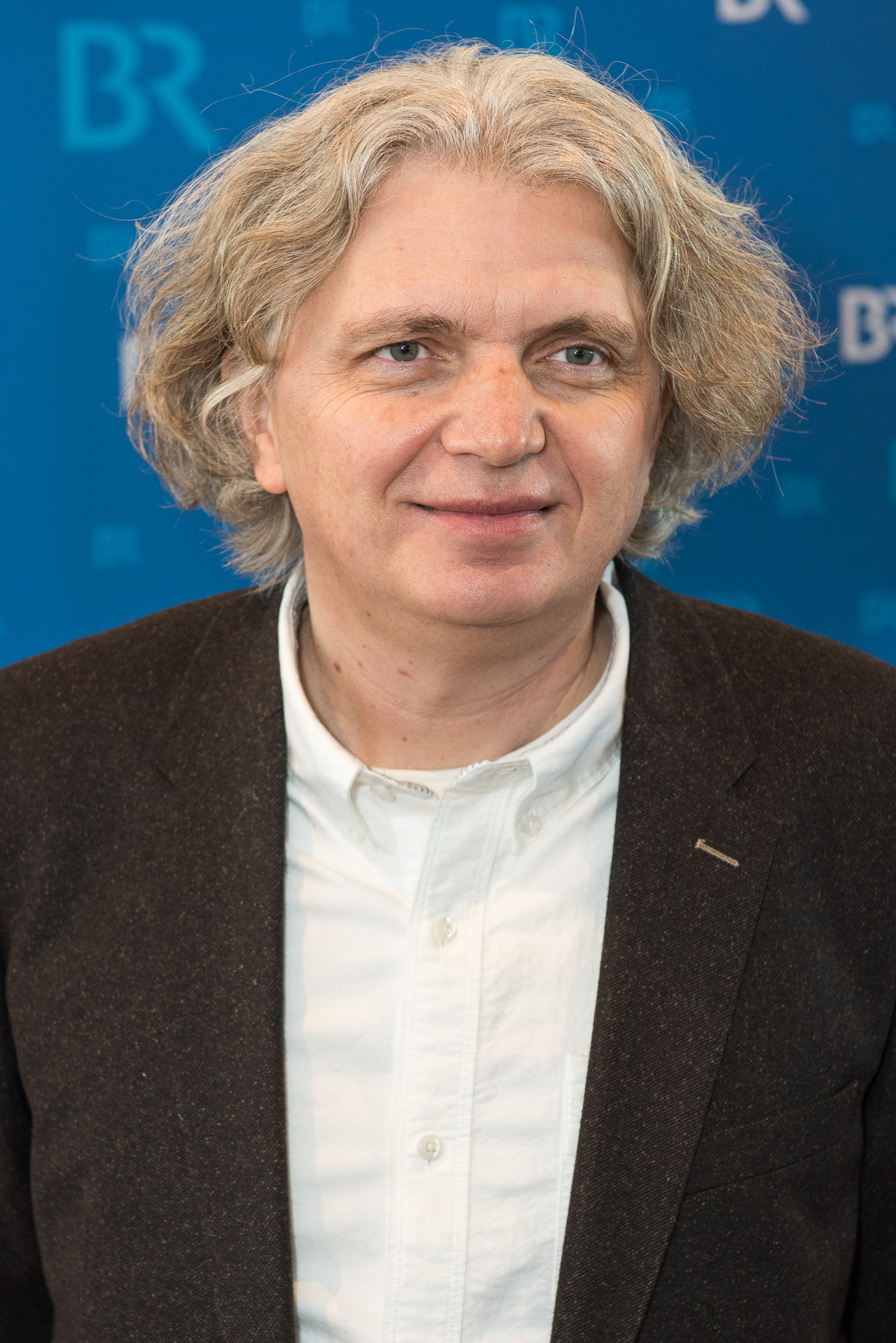
- Born: 13 November 1960 (age 65); Wiener Neustadt, Austria
- Occupation: Film director
- Years active: 1984-present

Wolfgang Murnberger (born 13 November 1960) is an Austrian film director.

Murnberger directed four film adaptations of Wolf Haas's Simon Brenner novels: Komm, süßer Tod (2000), Silentium (2004), The Bone Man (2009) and Life Eternal (2015).

== Career ==
Murnberger has directed extensively for television as well as cinema. His television work includes episodes of Tatort and several seasons of Vier Frauen und ein Todesfall.

Together with Wolf Haas and Josef Hader, Murnberger wrote the screenplays for four films based on Haas's Simon Brenner novels. Murnberger directed all four, with Hader playing Brenner. The films were Komm, süßer Tod (2000), Silentium (2004), The Bone Man (2009) and Life Eternal (2015).

Silentium premiered in the Panorama section of the 55th Berlin International Film Festival in 2005 and placed second in the Panorama Audience Award. In 2006, it won the Grand Prix at the Festival du Film Policier de Cognac.

The Bone Man screened in Panorama Special at the 59th Berlin International Film Festival in 2009. Murnberger's My Best Enemy (2011), starring Moritz Bleibtreu and Georg Friedrich, screened out of competition at the 61st Berlin International Film Festival.

Murnberger also directed a series of Styrian films for ORF's Landkrimi strand, beginning with Steirerblut (2014). Later entries include Steirerkind, Steirerwut, Steirerrausch, Steirerstern and Steirermord.

His television film Kästner and Little Tuesday received the Fernsehpreis der Österreichischen Erwachsenenbildung in the television-film category for 2017. The award was presented in June 2018 to Murnberger for his direction, Dorothee Schön for the screenplay and ORF editor Sabine Weber.

== Selected filmography ==
- Himmel oder Hölle (1990)
- Ich gelobe (1994)
- Komm, süßer Tod (2000)
- Brüder (2002, TV film)
- Silentium (2004)
- Lapislazuli – Im Auge des Bären (2006)
- The Bone Man (2009)
- Live Is Life (2010, TV film)
- Meine Tochter nicht (2010, TV film)
- My Best Enemy (2011)
- Alles Schwindel (2013, TV film)
- Live Is Life 2 (2013, TV film)
- Steirerblut (2014, TV film)
- Life Eternal (2015)
- Luis Trenker (2015, TV film)
- Kästner and Little Tuesday (2016, TV film)
- Steirerkind (2018, TV film)
- Steirerkreuz (2019, TV film)
- Steirerwut (2020, TV film)
- Steirertod (2021, TV film)
- Steirerrausch (2021, TV film)
- Steirerstern (2022, TV film)
- Steirergeld (2022, TV film)
- Steirerangst (2023, TV film)
- Steirerschuld (2023, TV film)
- Steirergift (2024, TV film)
- Steirermord (2024, TV film)
- Steirerwahn (2025, TV film)
- Steirerstich (2025, TV film)
