= The Bone Man =

- Directed by: Wolfgang Murnberger
- Written by: Wolf Haas; Josef Hader; Wolfgang Murnberger
- Produced by: Danny Krausz; Kurt Stocker
- Starring: Josef Hader; Birgit Minichmayr; Josef Bierbichler
- Cinematography: Peter von Haller
- Edited by: Evi Romen
- Release date: 19 February 2009
- Running time: 117 minutes
- Country: Austria
- Language: German

The Bone Man (German: Der Knochenmann) is a 2009 Austrian film directed by Wolfgang Murnberger. The script is based on the novel The Bone Man by Austrian author Wolf Haas.

== Cast ==
- Josef Hader - Simon Brenner
- Birgit Minichmayr - Birgit
- Josef Bierbichler - Löschenkohl
- Simon Schwarz - Berti
- Stipe Erceg - Evgenjew
- Pia Hierzegger - Alexandra Horvath
- Christoph Luser - Paul
- Dorka Gryllus - Valeria
- Ivan Shvedoff - Igor
