= Roland Düringer =

Austrian actor, cabarettist and political activist

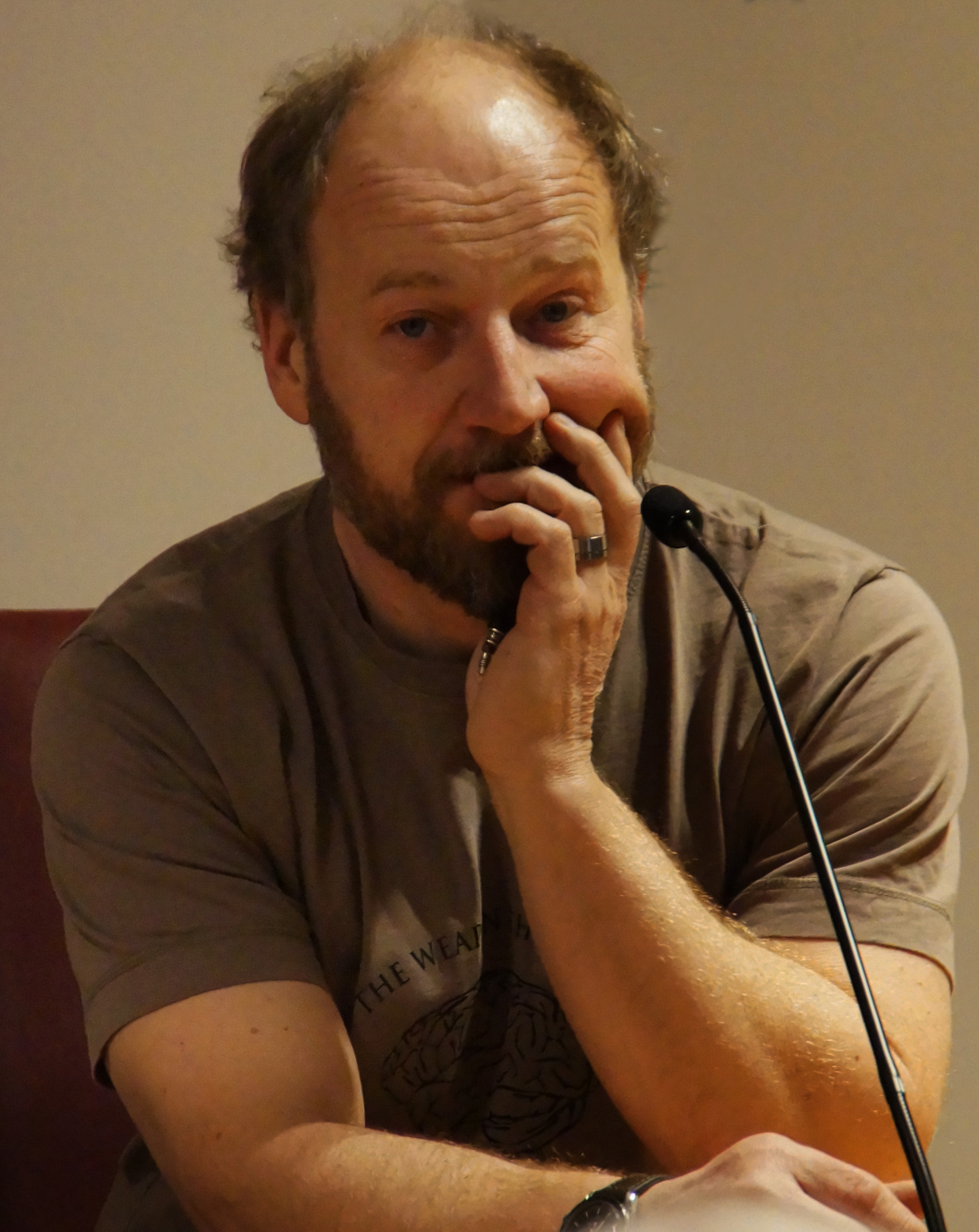
- Düringer on 20 January 2014
- Born: 31 October 1963 (age 62); Vienna, Austria
- Occupation: Actor
- Years active: 1985–present
- Political party: My Vote Counts!

Roland Düringer (born 31 October 1963) is an Austrian actor, cabarettist and political activist. He appeared in more than thirty films since 1985. He founded the political party My Vote Counts!, which participated in the nationwide Austrian legislative election, 2017 later that year.

== Selected filmography ==
Year	Title	Role	Notes
1993	Mother's Day	different roles	
1998	Hinterholz 8	Herbert Krcal	
1998-2002	MA 2412	Ing. Engelbert Breitfuss	
2000	Hold-Up		
2002	Poppitz	Gerry Schartl	
2003	MA 2412– Die Staatsdiener	Ing. Engelbert Breitfuss	
2009	Midsummer Madness	Karl	
2015	Life Eternal		
