= Hinterholz 8 =

- Directed by: Harald Sicheritz
- Starring: Roland Düringer; Nina Proll
- Release date: 18 September 1998
- Running time: 1h 45min
- Country: Austria
- Language: German
- Budget: $1.8 million
- Box office: 617,597 admissions (Austria)

Hinterholz 8 is a 1998 Austrian comedy film directed by Harald Sicheritz. It is the most successful Austrian film in Austria since the 1960s with admissions of 617,597.

== Plot ==
Herbert and Margit Krcal are a middle-class couple living in Vienna with their young son Philipp (a great fan of Star Trek). They think about leaving the crowded city and buying a home in a leafy area. First, they consider buying a prefab house, but find them too expensive. Herbert's drink-happy colleagues Meier and Forstinger convince him that he would be better off buying an old house and renovating it himself.

One day, they find an abandoned old cottage with a stunning view of the Vienna woods. They soon find out that the property belongs to the local village mayor, Kandler. The mayor manages to sell the house to Herbert for a much too high price, and the Krcals start to renovate it.

Soon they realize that there are numerous problems with the house. When a hired worker accidentally tears down the chimney, together with some of the walls, the cottage becomes inhabitable. Herbert hires a builder, but soon finds himself unable to pay the bills.

In the meantime, they have to leave their Vienna apartment, because they have promised it to the neighbouring doctor who wants to enlarge her office. They move into Margit's parents' summer cottage that has no heating, and the cold season is coming. After the bank has realized that the ruined house is no security for the loan, they refuse to help them financially.

The situation puts great strains on the marriage as well, and finally, Margit files for divorce. On Christmas Eve, Herbert sits alone in an old caravan next to his ruined house. Margit and their son Philipp visit him, and the boy is allowed to stay with his father for a few days.

They start digging a cellar and soon find a lot of human bones. They are informed by the local policeman that the house was built on an ancient mass grave for plague victims. Some time later, a completely crazy Herbert takes a real estate agent hostage. When he finally gives up, his family join him, and they all get beamed up by Captain Kirk on the Enterprise, while the police look on in amazement.

== Cast ==
- Roland Düringer - Herbert Krcal
- Nina Proll - Margit Krcal
- Rudolf Rohaczek - Philipp Krcal
- Wolfgang Böck - Meier
- Reinhard Nowak - Sepp Forstinger
- Lukas Resetarits - Willi, Margit's brother-in-law
- Herwig Seeböck - Kandler, the village mayor
- I Stangl - communal councilor
- Alfred Dorfer - Eberl, bank clerk
- Andrea Eckert - Gerda Bleichenberg, M.D.
- Eva Billisich - Mrs. Meier
- Rudolf Buczolich - Margit's father
- Erika Mottl - Margit's mother
- Karl Ferdinand Kratzl - Mündel, Kandler's assistant
- Andrea Händler - beautician
- Peter Fröhlich - Stefan, the Workman
