= Reinhard Nowak =

Austrian actor

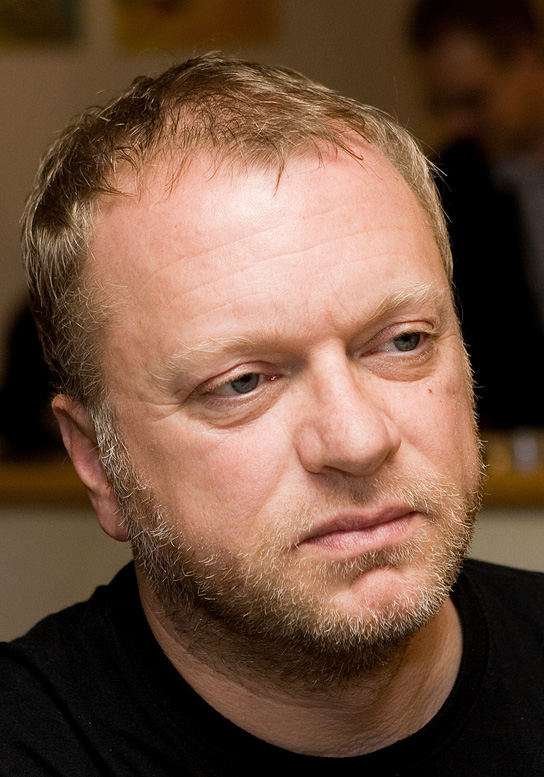
- Nowak in 2008
- Born: 28 April 1964 (age 62); Munich, Germany
- Occupation: Actor
- Years active: 1985-present

Reinhard Nowak (born 28 April 1964) is an Austrian actor. He has appeared in more than sixty films since 1985.

== Selected filmography ==
Year	Title	Role	Notes
1993	Mother's Day		
1998	Hinterholz 8		
2000	Komm, süßer Tod		
