= Harald Sicheritz =

Austrian screenwriter and film director (born 1958)

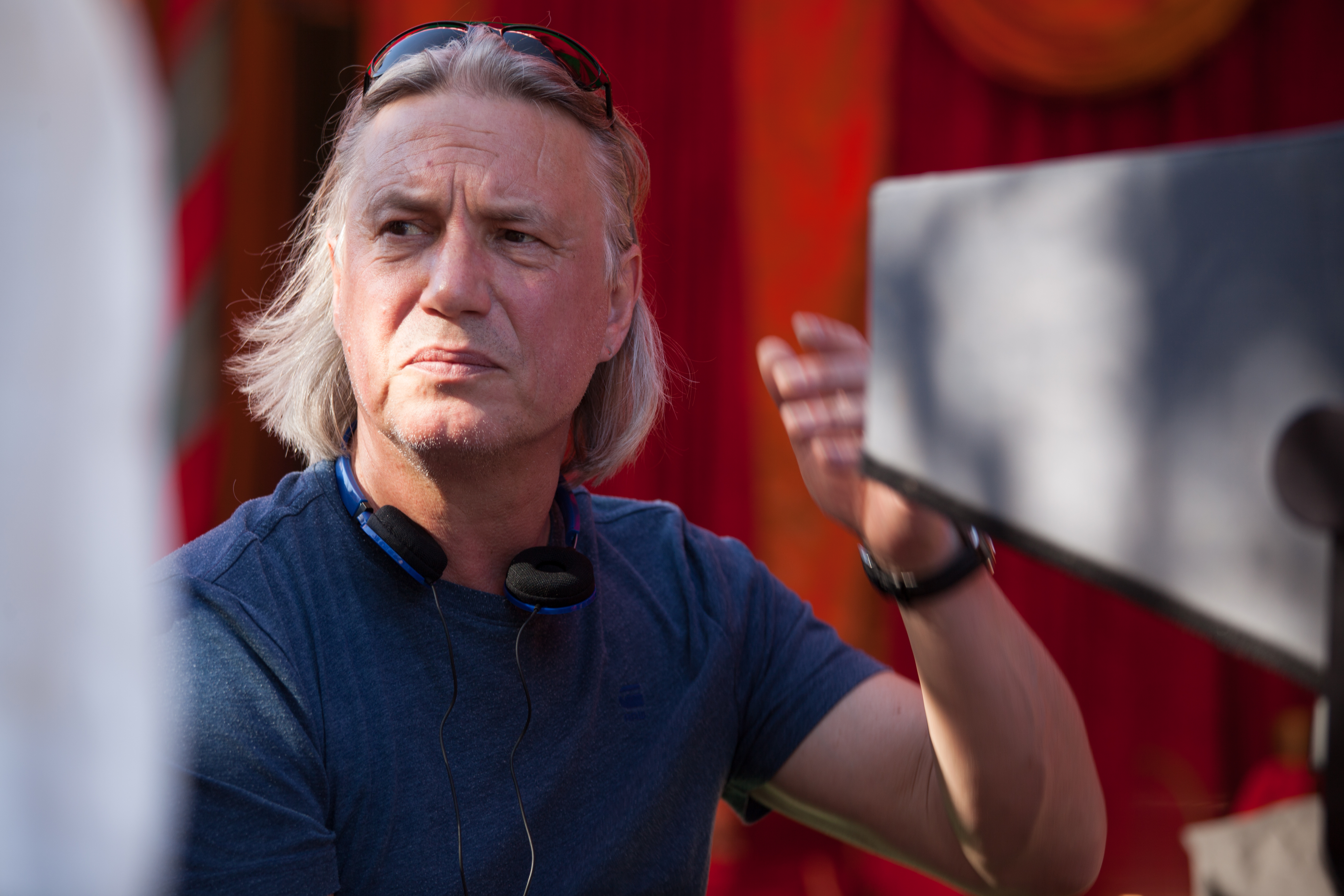
- on set, 2016
- Born: 25 June 1958 (age 68); Stockholm, Sweden
- Occupations: Film director, screenwriter
- Years active: 1980–present
- Website: www.sicheritz.com

Harald Sicheritz (born 25 June 1958 in Stockholm, Sweden) is an Austrian screenwriter and film director.

== Life and career ==
Raised in a working-class district of Vienna, Harald Sicheritz studied Communication sciences and Political sciences. In 1983 he graduated with a Ph.D. – his thesis' title was How does TV entertain?

Sicheritz first became known as a bass player and songwriter of the rock band Wiener Wunder, who in 1986 contributed to the soundtrack of the musical comedy blockbuster Müllers Büro and scored a #1 hit in the Austrian charts with Loretta.
From 1980 to 1984 Sicheritz earned his spurs as a filmmaker by working for the TV program Ohne Maulkorb with ORF. In 2009 he was among the founders of the Austrian Film Academy and served as member of the board for the first ten years.

His 1993 feature film debut Mother's Day made Harald Sicheritz one of Austria's most renowned directors – the film achieved cult status right away. Besides his regular work for the big screen he writes, co-writes and/or directs TV films and episodes for TV series (e.g. Tatort, Kaisermühlen Blues, MA 2412, Vier Frauen und ein Todesfall, Die Gipfelzipfler, Vorstadtweiber), as well as numerous TV commercials.

The Sicheritz feature films Hinterholz 8 (617.596 admissions) und Poppitz (441.082) rank as #1 and #3 in the Austrian Film Institute's all time box office charts, kept since 1982. His 11 feature films to date sold more than 2 million tickets in Austria.

== Filmography (selection) ==
- 1993: Mother's Day
- 1995: Freispiel (Replay)
- 1997: Qualtingers Wien
- 1998: Hinterholz 8
- 1999: Fink fährt ab
- 1999: Wanted
- 1999: Jahrhundertrevue
- 2000: Zwölfeläuten (The Silent Bell)
- 2000: Trautmann: Wer heikel ist, bleibt übrig
- 2002: Poppitz
- 2003: MA 2412 – Die Staatsdiener (The Civil Servants)
- 2005: Im Reich der Reblaus (Mutig in die neuen Zeiten 1)
- 2006: Nur keine Wellen (Mutig in die neuen Zeiten 2)
- 2006: Alles anders (Mutig in die neuen Zeiten 3)
- 2007: Darum
- 2008: Tatort: Baum der Erlösung
- 2010: Tatort: Ausgelöscht
- 2010: 3faltig
- 2011: Lilly The Witch – The Journey To Mandolan
- 2012: Tatort: Zwischen den Fronten
- 2013: [ba:d fʊkɪŋ] (Hicktown)
- 2013: Tatort: Abgründe
- 2014: Clara Immerwahr
- 2014: Tatort: Paradies
- 2014-19: Vorstadtweiber TV series
- 2016: Landkrimi – Sommernachtsmord

== Awards ==
- 2016: Austrian Cross of Honour for Science and Art
- 2013: Decoration Of Merit in Gold to the State of Vienna
- 2011: ACC Golden Ticket (Lilly The Witch – The Journey to Mandolan)
- 2008: Austrian State Award for Film Commercials (Mercutio)
- 2006: Cannes Lions Film Finalist (Church)
- 2004: ACC Golden Ticket (MA 2412 – Die Staatsdiener)
- 2003: ACC Golden Ticket (Poppitz)
- 2002: Austrian People's Education TV Award (Zwölfeläuten)
- 2000: Romy (TV Award) – Most Successful Austrian Movie of the Year (Wanted)
- 2000: ACC Golden Ticket (Wanted)
- 1999: Erich Neuberg Award (Qualtingers Wien)
- 1999: Romy (TV Award) – Most Successful Austrian Movie of the Year (Hinterholz 8)
- 1998: ACC Platinum Ticket (Hinterholz 8)
- 1996: ACC Golden Ticket (Freispiel)
- 1996: Romy (TV Award) – Most Successful Austrian Movie of the Year (Freispiel)
