= Alfred Dorfer =

Austrian comedian, writer, and actor

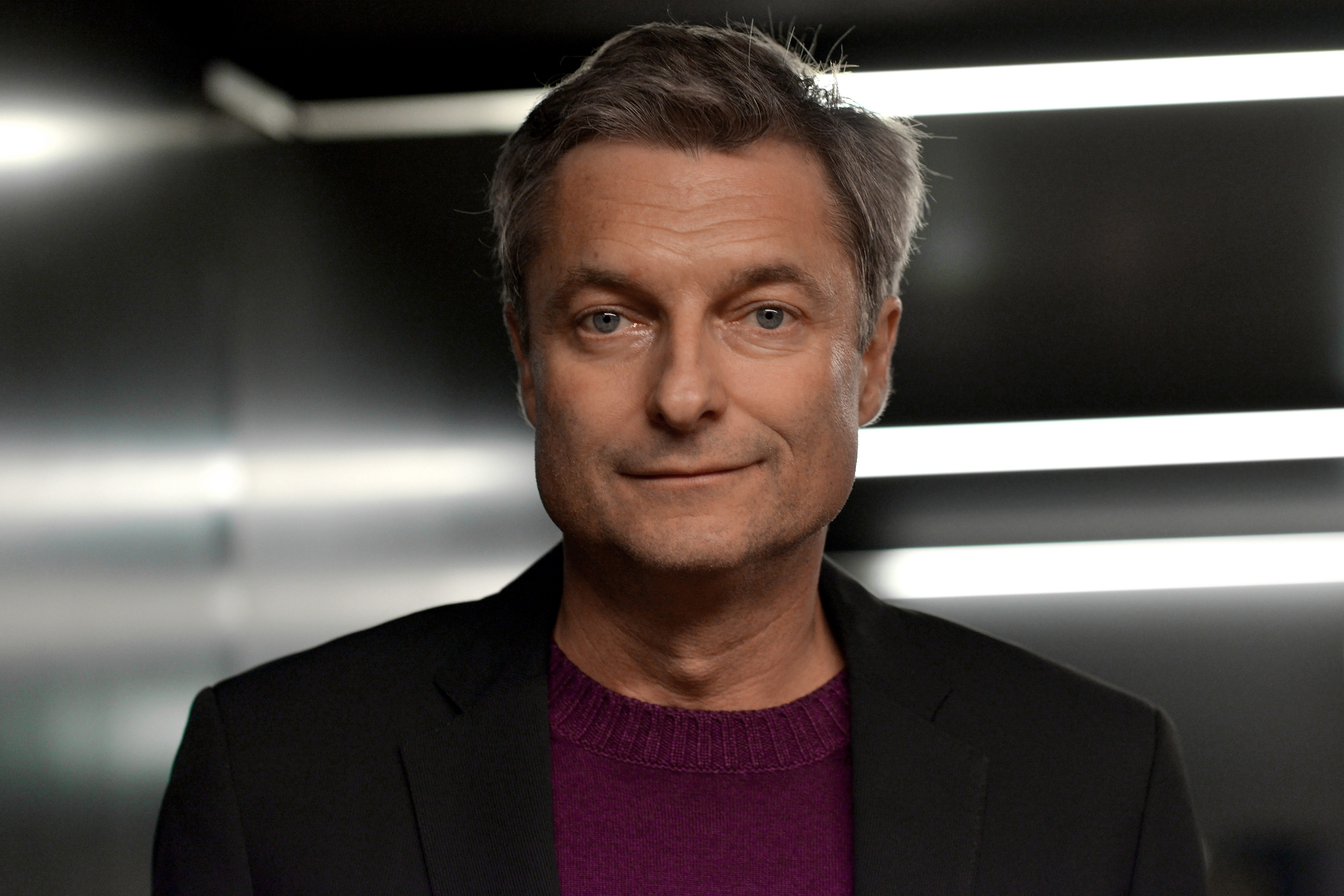
- Alfred Dorfer in 2014
- Born: 11 October 1961 (age 63); Vienna, Austria

Alfred Dorfer (German pronunciation: [ˈalfʁeːt ˈdɔʁfɐ]; 11 October 1961) is an Austrian comedian, writer, and actor. He is one of the most well-known cabaret artists and comedians in Austria, not least due to his commitment to numerous Austrian film productions. After initial success with the group Schlabarett he attained more widespread recognition as the writer and star (alongside Josef Hader) of the film Indien. Today, Dorfer is among "the most important satirists and authors in the German-speaking world."

== Film ==
In 1993 Dorfer appeared alongside Josef Hader in the film Indien under the direction of Paul Harather. A year later came the film Muttertag (Mother's Day), in which he appeared alongside such other prominent Austrian actors and comedians as Roland Düringer, Andrea Händler and Reinhard Nowak. In 1995 he appeared in Freispiel ("Freegame") under the direction of Harald Sicheritz, once more appearing alongside Roland Düringer.

== Television ==
From 2004 to 2010 he presented a show on the Austrian channel ORF called Dorfers Donnerstalk on Thursday nights, which was a mix of stand-up comedy, sketches and social commentary.
