= MA 2412 =

- Genre: sitcom
- Country of origin: Austria

Production
- Running time: 20-25 minutes

Original release
- Network: ORF 1
- Release: 1998 – 2002

MA 2412 is an Austrian television series that satirizes the bureaucracy in public administration in the form of a fictional "Municipal Department (Magistratsabteilung) for Christmas Decorations" of the city of Vienna.

== See also ==
- List of Austrian television series
