= Peirene Press =

Publishing house

- Status: Active
- Founded: 2008
- Founder: Meike Ziervogel
- Country of origin: United Kingdom
- Headquarters location: London, N19
- Publication types: Books
- Fiction genres: Literature in translation, Contemporary fiction, Novella
- Official website: www.peirenepress.com

Peirene Press is an independent publishing house based in Bath. Established by the novelist and journalist Meike Ziervogel, Peirene publishes literary fiction in translation from all over the world. Their books are regularly listed for significant UK literary and translation prizes, including the International Booker Prize, and in 2023 they won the International Dublin Literary Award with Marzahn, Mon Amour by Katja Oskamp, translated from German by Jo Heinrich.

The Stevns Translation Prize is jointly run by Peirene Press (UK) and Two Lines Press (US). It is an annual prize for emerging translators.

== List of books ==
=== 2010 – Female Voice ===
- Beside the Sea by Véronique Olmi (translated from the French by Adriana Hunter)
- Stone in a Landslide by Maria Barbal (translated from the Catalan: Laura McGloughlin and Paul Mitchell)
- Portrait of the Mother as a Young Woman by Friedrich Christian Delius (translated from the German: Jamie Bulloch)

=== 2011 – Male Dilemma ===
- Next World Novella by Matthias Politycki (translated from the German: Anthea Bell)
- Tomorrow Pamplona by Jan van Mersbergen (translated from the Dutch: Laura Watkinson)
- Maybe This Time by Alois Hotschnig (translated from the Austrian German: Tess Lewis)

=== 2012 – Small Epic ===
- The Brothers by Asko Sahlberg (translated from the Finnish: Fleur Jeremiah and Emily Jeremiah)
- The Murder of Halland by Pia Juul (translated from the Danish: Martin Aitken)
- Sea of Ink by Richard Weihe (translated from the German: Jamie Bulloch)

=== 2013 – Turning Point ===
- The Mussel Feast by Birgit Vanderbeke (translated from the German: Jamie Bulloch)
- Mr Darwin's Gardener by Kristina Carlson (translated from the Finnish: Emily Jeremiah and Fleur Jeremiah)
- Chasing the King of Hearts by Hanna Krall (translated from the Polish: Philip Boehm)

=== 2014 – Coming of Age ===
- The Dead Lake by Hamid Ismailov (translated from the Russian: Andrew Bromfield)
- The Blue Room by Hanne Ørstavik (translated from the Norwegian: Deborah Dawkin)
- Under the Tripoli Sky by Kamal Ben Hameda (translated from the French: Adriana Hunter)

=== 2015 – Chance Encounter ===
- White Hunger by Aki Ollikainen (translated from the Finnish: Fleur Jeremiah and Emily Jeremiah)
- Reader for Hire by Raymond Jean (translated from the French: Adriana Hunter)
- The Looking-Glass Sisters by Gøhril Gabrielsen (translated from the Norwegian: John Irons)

=== 2016 – Fairy Tale ===
- The Man I Became by Peter Verhelst (translated from the Dutch: by David Colmer)
- Her Father's Daughter by Marie Sizun (translated from the French: Adriana Hunter)
- The Empress and the Cake by Linda Stift (translated from the Austrian German: Jamie Bulloch)

=== 2017 – East and West ===
- The Last Summer by Ricarda Huch (translated from the German: Jamie Bulloch)
- The Orange Grove by Larry Tremblay (translated from the French: Sheila Fischman)
- Dance by the Canal by Kerstin Hensel (translated from the German: Jen Calleja)

=== 2018 – Home in Exile ===
- Soviet Milk by Nora Ikstena (translated from the Latvian: Margita Gailitis)
- Shadows on the Tundra by Dalia Grinkevičiūtė (translated from the Lithuanian: Delija Valiukenas)
- And the Wind Sees All by Guðmundur Andri Thorsson (translated from the Icelandic: Bjørg Arnadottir) and Andrew Cauthery

=== 2019 – There Be Monsters ===
- Children of the Cave by Virve Sammalkorpi (translated from the Finnish: Emily Jeremiah & Fleur Jeremiah)
- You Would Have Missed Me by Birgit Vanderbeke (translated from the German: Jamie Bulloch)
- Faces on the Tip of My Tongue by Emmanuelle Pagano (translated from the French: Jennifer Higgins and Sophie Lewis)

=== 2020 – Closed Universe ===
- Snow, Dog, Foot by Claudio Morandini (translated from the Italian by J Ockenden)
- Ankomst by Gøhril Gabrielsen (translated from the Norwegian by Deborah Dawkin)
- The Pear Field by Nana Ekvtimishvili (translated from the Georgian by Elizabeth Heighway)

=== 2021 – Metamorphoses ===
- Peirene #34 – Nordic Fauna by Andrea Lundgren (translated from the Swedish by John Litell)
- Peirene #35 – Yesterday by Juan Emar (translated by Megan McDowell)
- Peirene #36 – Winter Flowers by Angélique Villeneuve (translated by Adriana Hunter)

=== 2022 ===
- Marzahn, Mon Amour by Katja Oskamp (translated by Jo Heinrich)
- Of Saints and Miracles by Manuel Astur (translated from Spanish by Claire Wadie)
- Body Kintsugi by Senka Marić (translated from Bosnian by Celia Hawkesworth)

=== 2023 ===
- History. A Mess. by Sigrún Pálsdóttir (translated by Lytton Smith)
- The Love of Singular Men by Victor Heringer (translated by James Young)
- As the Eagle Flies by Nolwenn Le Blevennec (translated by Madeleine Rogers)
- Venom by Saneh Sangsuk (translated by Mui Poopoksakul)
- The Understory by Saneh Sangsuk (translated by Mui Poopoksakul)

=== 2024 ===
- About Uncle by Rebecca Gisler (translated by Jordan Stump)
- Anomaly by Andrej Nikolaidis (translated by Will Firth)
- Un Amor by Sara Mesa (translated by Katie Whittemore)
- Glória by Victor Heringer (translated by James Young and Sophie Lewis)
- Half Swimmer by Katja Oskamp (translated by Jo Heinrich)
- A Simple Intervention by Yael Inokai (translated by Marielle Sutherland)
- Djinns by Fatma Aydemir (translated by Jon Cho-Polizzi)

=== 2025 ===
- On the Greenwich Line by Shady Lewis (translated by Katharine Halls)
- Iron Lung by Kirstine Reffstrup (translated by Hunter Simpson)
- Friends and Lovers by Nolwenn Le Blevennec (translated by Madeleine Rogers)
- Supporting Act by Agnes Lidbeck (translated by Nichola Smalley)
- Four by Four by Sara Mesa (translated by Katie Whittemore)
- Sea Now by Eva Meijer (translated by Anne Thompson Melo)
- Imagine Breaking Everything by Lina Munar Guevara

== Other titles ==
- breach by Olúmìdé Pópóọlá and Annie Holmes
- The Cut by Anthony Cartwright
- Shatila Stories

== Awards ==
- Independent Publishers Guild Newcomer Award 2011.
- Highly commended at the British Book Design and Production Awards 2011 and 2013.
- Peirene titles have been long-listed for the Independent Foreign Fiction Prize in 2011, 2012, 2013, 2014 and 2015.
