= Éditions Phébus =

French publishing house

- Founded: 1976; 49 years ago
- Founder: Jean-Pierre Sicre
- Country of origin: France
- Headquarters location: Paris
- Publication types: Books, Magazines
- Official website: www.editionsphebus.fr

The éditions Phébus is a French publishing house established in 1976 by Jean-Pierre Sicre and taken over in 2003 by the groupe Libella.

== Catalogue ==
Phébus publishes a catalog of French and foreign literature that is both contemporary (Julie Otsuka, Elif Shafak, Hugo Hamilton, Jesús Greus, Joseph O'Connor, Elisabeth Crane, Karel Schoeman, Françoise Cloarec, Annie Butor, Jeanne Cordelier, Marcel Lévy, Keith Ridgway, Angélique Villeneuve, Christian Chevassieux, Christophe Carlier, Gil Jouanard, David Boratav, Nathalie Peyrebonne, Martine Desjardin, Eric Plamondon, ... ) and classical (Wilkie Collins, Jack London, E. T. A. Hoffmann, Robert Margerit), with, historically, a predilection for travel stories (Longue Marche) by Bernard Ollivier, Vérification de la porte opposée by Sylvain Tesson), and testimonies (La Fin de ma Russie, Journal d'une jeune fille russe à Berlin).

The house published until recently in pocket format the éditions Libretto.

== History ==
The economic situation of the Phébus editions has long been problematic. When they won the Prix des Libraires in 1985, the Éditions Phébus had a catalog of almost a hundred titles and gained some recognition from the public. In 2006, two years after the takeover of the house by the Libella group, the departure of the publisher Jean-Pierre Sicre shook Phébus. The foreign literature department directed by Daniel Arsand until October 2015 is now directed by Nils C. Ahl and the French literature one by Louis Chevaillier, former head of the Folio collection, who took over from Lionel Besnier. A new generation that hosts a catalog of fluent, incarnated and generous texts inspired by Blaise Cendrars in Rhum to young people of today who are tired of literature to prove to them that "A novel can also be an act".

== Authors ==
- Mathieu Terence
- Bernard Ollivier
- Christian Chevassieux
- Daniel Arsand
- Françoise Cloarec
- Gil Jouanard
- Roland Garros
- Sylvain Tesson
- Cédric Gras
- E. T. A. Hoffmann
- Wilkie Collins
- Alexander Kent
- Julie Otsuka
- Joseph O'Connor
- Oya Baydar
- Julie Otsuka
- Christian Kracht
- Elif Shafak
- Hugo Hamilton
- Keith Ridgway
- Karel Schoeman
- Elizabeth Crane
- Anne Tyler
- Carsten Jensen
- Drago Jančar
