= Emily Jeremiah =

British academic and literary translator

Emily Jeremiah is a British academic and literary translator. She studied modern languages at Exeter College, Oxford, and obtained her PhD from Swansea University. She has taught at Helsinki University, Goldsmiths College and finally Royal Holloway University where she is Professor of Contemporary Literature and Gender Studies.

Jeremiah is the author or editor of the following academic books:

- Troubling Maternity: Mothering, Agency, and Ethics in Women's Writing in German of the 1970s and 1980s (Maney/MHRA, 2003)
- Nomadic Ethics in Contemporary Women's Writing in German: Strange Subjects (Camden House, 2012)
- Willful Girls: Gender and Agency in Contemporary Anglo-American and German Fiction (2018).
- (co-editor) Ethical Approaches in Contemporary German-Language Literature and Culture (Edinburgh German Yearbook 7 2013)
- (co-editor) Motherhood in Literature and Culture: Interdisciplinary Perspectives from Europe (Routledge, 2017).

To non-academic readers, Jeremiah is best known as a translator of Finnish and German literature. She typically works with her Finnish-born mother Fleur Jeremiah; several of their translations have been published by Peirene Press. Their translated works include:

- Children of the Cave by Virve Sammalkorpi
- Mr Darwin's Gardener by Kristina Carlson
- The Brothers by Asko Sahlberg
- Things that Fall from the Sky by Selja Ahava
- White Hunger by Aki Ollikainen
- A Window Left Open by Pentti Saarikoski

Jeremiah has also translated Finnish children's books and poetry collections by Eeva-Liisa Manner and Sirkka Turkka. In 2020, her own novella Blue Moments was published by Valley Press. Her second novella, An Approach to Black, was published by Reflex Press in 2021.
