= Mui Poopoksakul =

Thai translator

Mui Poopoksakul (Thai: มุ่ย ภู่พกสกุล) is a Thai lawyer and literary translator. She primarily translates works of contemporary Thai literature into English, among them texts by Prabda Yoon, Chart Korbjitti, Duanwad Pimwana, and Saneh Sangsuk.

== Selected translations ==
- Prabda Yoon - The Sad Part Was (2017, Tilted Axis)
- Prabda Yoon - Moving Parts (2018, Tilted Axis)
- Duanwad Pimwana - Bright (2019, Two Lines Press)
- Duanwad Pimwana - Arid Dreams (2019, Feminist Press)
- Saneh Sangsuk - The Understory (Peirene Press)
- Saneh Sangsuk - Venom (Peirene Press)

Her work has appeared in Two Lines, Asymptote, Quarterly Conversation, In Other Words, and Words Without Borders.

She lives in Berlin.
