= Laura McGloughlin =

British translator

- Education: University College Cork; University of East Anglia (MA)
- Occupation: Literary translator
- Writing career
- Language: English
- Genres: Catalan and Spanish literature
- Notable works: Stone in a Landslide by Maria Barbal; The Summer of Dead Toys and The Good Suicides by Antonio Hill; The Island of Last Truth by Flavia Company; Hairless by Bel Olid

Laura McGloughlin is a translator of Catalan and Spanish literature into English. Her translated works include Stone in a Landslide by Maria Barbal, The Summer of Dead Toys and The Good Suicides by Antonio Hill, The Island of Last Truth by Flavia Company, and Hairless: Breaking the Vicious Circle of Hair Removal, Submission, and Self-Hatred by Bel Olid.

== Biography ==
McGloughlin is an alumna of the University College Cork. She completed a master's in literary translation from the University of East Anglia. She has worked as an assessor for the English PEN Translates programme and as a commercial manager for Waterstones Booksellers. McGloughlin lives in London.

== Translations ==
Translations by McGloughlin include Lluïsa Cunillé's play The Sale (Parthian, 2008), Stone in a Landslide by Maria Barbal (Peirene, 2010), the crime novels The Summer of Dead Toys and The Good Suicides by Antonio Hill, The Island of Last Truth by Flavia Company, as well as Wilder Winds and Hairless: Breaking the Vicious Circle of Hair Removal, Submission, and Self-Hatred by Bel Olid.

In his review of The Summer of Dead Toys, Barry Forshaw of The Independent noted that the "nuanced" translation reflected the "evocative and atmospheric language" of the original work. In a review of The Island of Last Truth for the Literary Review, Kate Munning writes that McGloughlin's "exquisite translation skills are in full effect throughout, from Prendel's engrossing, off-kilter internal monologues to his riveting escapades."

== Honors and awards ==
- 2011 British Centre for Literary Translation Catalan-English Translation Mentorship
- 2018 shortlist, BookTrust In Other Words project, for translation of The Film Of Our Life by Maite Carranza
- 2022 Translator-In-Residence for the British Centre for Literary Translation
