= Georges-Emmanuel Clancier =

French poet, novelist, and journalist

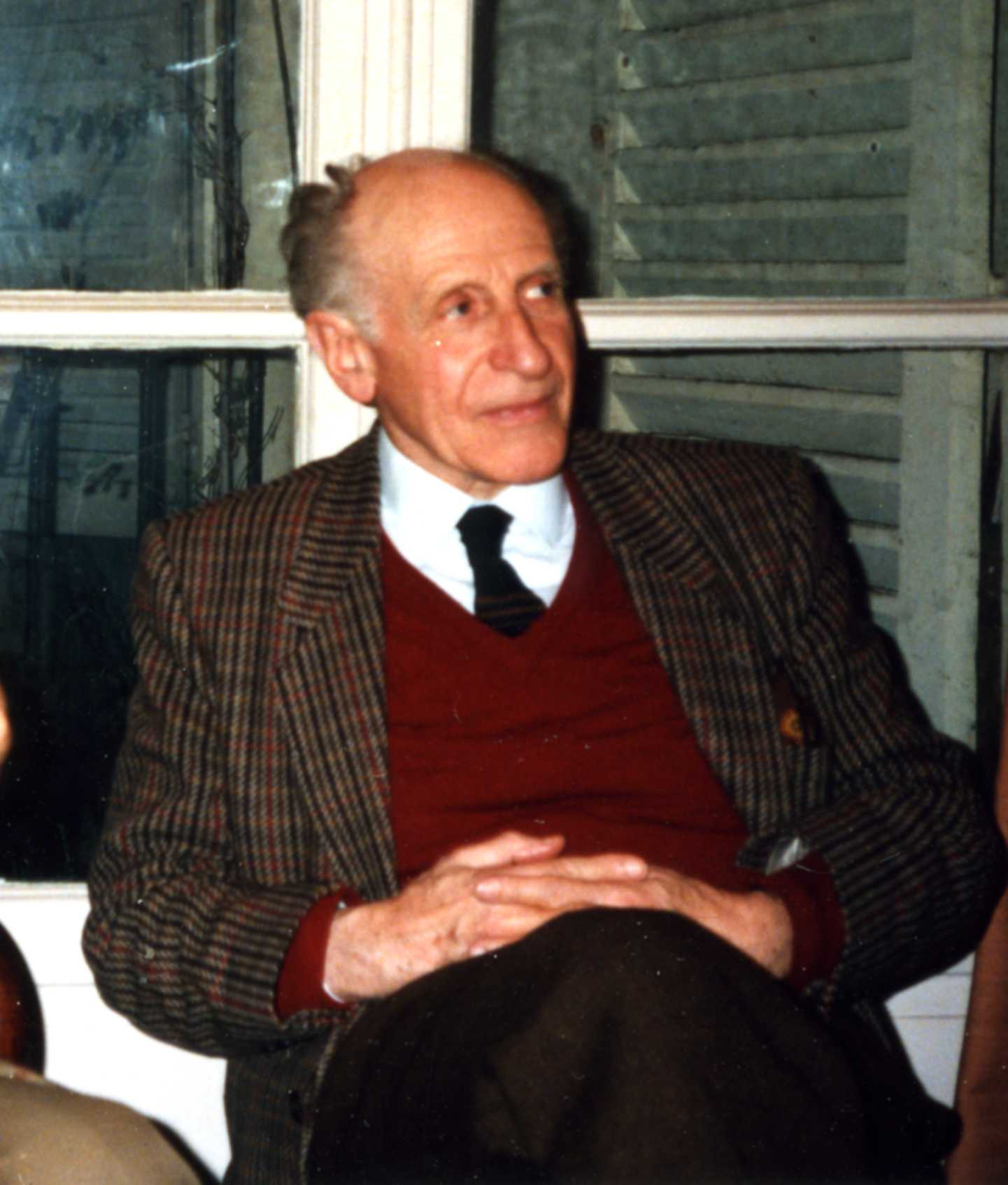
- Georges-Emmanuel Clancier In Paris, France 1987
- Born: 3 May 1914; Limoges, France
- Died: 4 July 2018 (aged 104); Paris, France
- Occupations: Poet, novelist, journalist
- Awards: Prix Maurice Bourdet (1949); Société des gens de lettres Grand Prize (1957); Prix des Quatre Juries (1957); Booksellers Award (1970); Académie française Grand Prix (1971); Prix Goncourt (1992)

Georges-Emmanuel Clancier (3 May 1914 – 4 July 2018) was a French poet, novelist, and journalist. He won the Prix Goncourt (poetry), the Grand Prize of the Académie française, and the grand prize of the Société des gens de lettres.

== Life ==
Clancier was born in Limoges, France on 3 May 1914. He began writing poems and, in 1933, to work for journals including Les Cahiers du Sud. He came in 1939 to Paris, but returned in 1940 in Limousin, studying at the Faculty of Arts at Poitiers and Toulouse, and met Joe Bousquet in Carcassonne. In 1940, he joined the editorial board of the journal Fontaine led in Algiers by Max-Pol Fouchet. In Saint-Léonard-de-Noblat (Haute-Vienne), he met Raymond Queneau, Michel Leiris, Lourmarin Claude Roy, Pierre Seghers, Loys Masson, Pierre Emmanuel and Max-Pol Fouchet. From 1942 to 1944, he collected and transmitted secretly in Algiers texts of writers of the French Resistance to occupied France.

After the Liberation, he was responsible for programs on Radio-Limoges, and was a journalist for the Populaire du Centre. He wrote articles and made extensive comments on the radio, of the work of Maurice Boitel, who came to paint in the region. He founded, with Robert Margerit and René Rougerie, the magazine Centres, then edited a collection of poems, manuscripts, poetry and criticism for Éditions Rougerie (including poems by Claude Roy, Jean Lescure, Boris Vian).

From 1955 to 1970, he worked in Paris as secretary general of the programming committees of Radiodiffusion-Télévision Française, (which later became the ORTF). In 1956 he published Le Pain noir, a series of novels in which he told, until 1961, the story of his family, and his maternal grandmother, an illiterate shepherd. Le Pain noir, was adapted for television in 1974, by Françoise Verny and Serge Moati.

He was President of the PEN of France from 1976 to 1979, where he worked in the defense of writers threatened, detained, deported or exiled. In 1980 he was vice-president of the French Commission for UNESCO, in 1987 Vice President of International PEN, and chairman of the House of Writers which was founded in 1986 to 1990. He turned 100 on May 3, 2014, and died on July 4, 2018, at the age of 104.

== Awards ==
- 1949 Prix Maurice Bourdet
- 1957 The Grand Prize Société des gens de lettres
- 1957 Prix des Quatre Juries
- 1970 Booksellers Award
- 1971 Grand Prix of the Académie française
- 1992 Prix Goncourt

== Works ==
=== Poetry ===
- Temps des héros, Cahiers de l'École de Rochefort, 1943.
- Le Paysan céleste, Marseille, Robert Laffont, 1943.
- Journal parlé, Limoges, Rougerie, 1949.
- Terre secrète, Paris, Seghers, 1951.
- L'Autre rive, Limoges, Rougerie, 1952.
- Vrai visage, Paris, Seghers, 1953; Paris, Robert Laffont, 1965.
- Une Voix, Paris, Gallimard (Prix Artaud 1957).
- Évidences, Paris, Mercure de France, 1960.
- Terres de Mémoire, Paris, Robert Laffont, 1965.
- Le Siècle et l'espace, Marc Pessein, 1970.
- Peut-être une demeure, précédé d' Écriture des jours, Paris, Gallimard, 1972.
- Le Voyage analogique, Paris, Jean Briance, 1976.
- Oscillante parole, Paris, Gallimard, 1978.
- Mots de l'Aspre, Georges Badin, 1980.
- Le Poème hanté, Paris, Gallimard, 1983.
- Le Paysan céleste, suivi de Chansons sur porcelaine, Notre temps, Écriture des jours, préface de Pierre Gascar, Paris, Poésie Gallimard, 1984.
- L'Orée, Luxembourg, Euroeditor, 1987.
- Tentative d'un cadastre amoureux, Ottawa (Canada), Écrits des Forges, 1989.
- Passagers du temps, Paris, Gallimard, 1991.
- Contre-Chants, Paris, Gallimard, 2001.
- Terres de mémoire suivi de Vrai visage, Paris, La Table Ronde, coll. poche La Petite vermillon n° 187, 2003, 288 p. (ISBN 2710325683).
- Le Paysan céleste - Notre part d'or et d'ombre (poèmes 1950–2000), préface d'André Dhôtel, Paris, Poésie/Gallimard, 2008.
- Vive fut l'aventure, Paris, Gallimard, 2008.

=== Novels ===
- Quadrille sur la tour, Alger, Edmond Charlot, 1942 puis Mercure de France 1963
- La Couronne de vie, Paris, Edmond Charlot, 1946
- Dernière heure, Paris, Gallimard, 1951; Éditions du Rocher, 1998
- Le Pain noir (I), Paris, Robert Laffont, 1956
- La Fabrique du roi (II), Paris, Robert Laffont, 1957
- Les Drapeaux de la ville (III), Paris, Robert Laffont, 1959
- La Dernière Saison (IV), Paris, Robert Laffont, 1961
- Les Incertains, Paris, Seghers, 1965; Paris, Robert Laffont, 1970
- L'Éternité plus un jour, Paris, Robert Laffont, 1969; La Table Ronde, 2005
- La Halte dans l'été, Paris, Robert Laffont, 1976
- Le Pain noir, La Fabrique du roi, Tome I, Les Drapeaux de la ville, La dernière saison, Tome II, Paris, Robert Laffont, 1991
- Une Ombre Sarrasine, Paris, Albin Michel, 1996

=== Stories ===
- La Couleuvre du dimanche, Nice, Méditerranea, 1937
- Le Parti des enfants, Paris, Les Œuvres libres n°137, Arthème Fayard, 1957
- Le Baptême, Paris, Les Œuvres libres n° 156, Arthème Fayard, 1959
- Les Arènes de Vérone, Paris, Robert Laffont, 1964
- L'Enfant de neige, Paris, Casterman, 1978
- L'Enfant qui prenait le vent, Paris, Casterman, 1984

=== Autobiography ===
- Ces ombres qui m'éclairent:
  - L'Enfant double, Paris, Albin Michel, 1984
  - L'Ecolier des rêves, Paris, Albin Michel, 1986
  - Un Jeune Homme au secret, Paris, Albin Michel, 1989
