= Sara Mesa =

Spanish writer (born 1976)

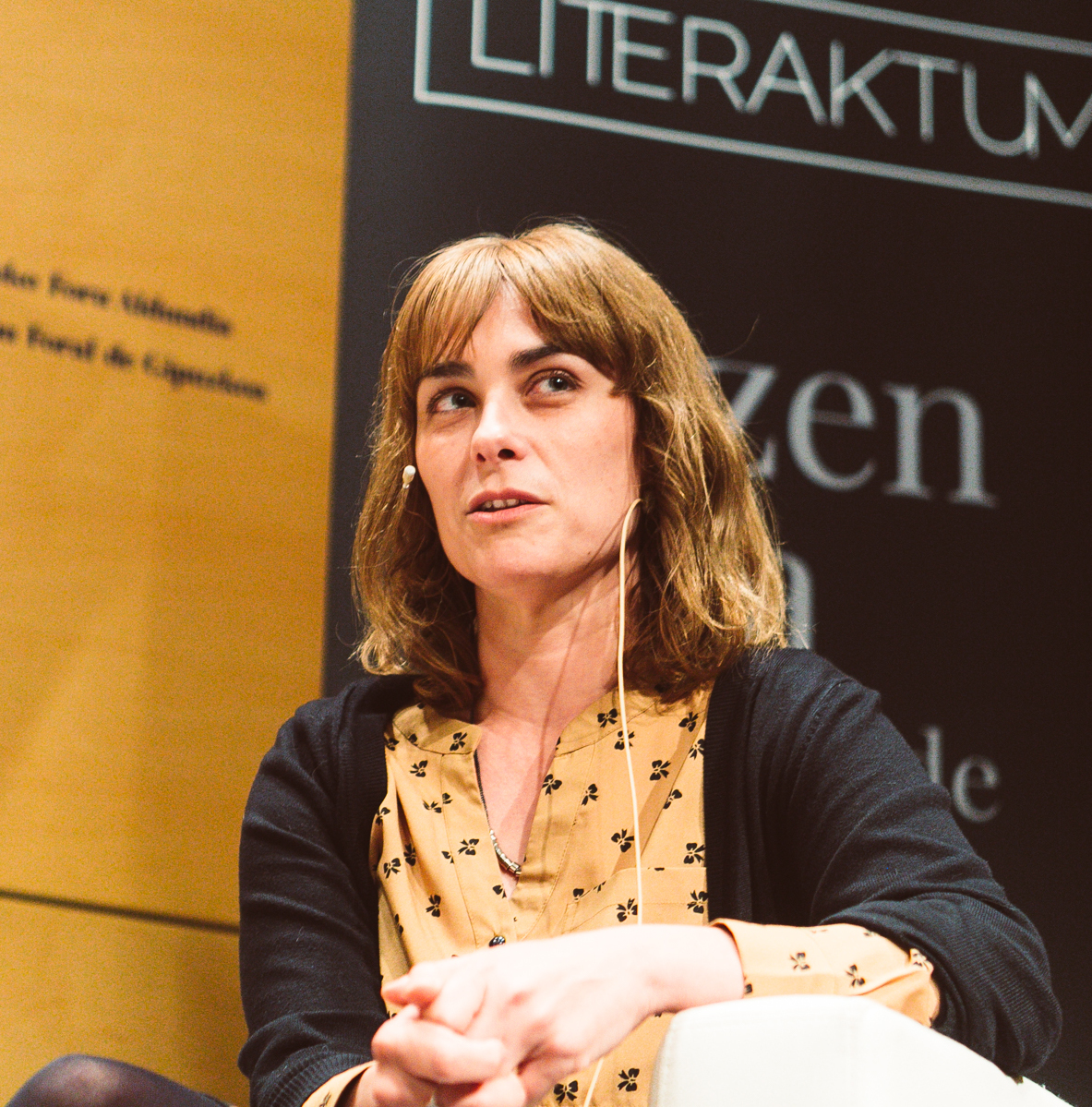
- Born: 1976 (age 49–50); Madrid, Spain
- Occupations: Novelist; short story writer

Sara Mesa (born 1976) is a Spanish writer, widely translated and internationally recognized. Born in Madrid, she has lived in Seville since childhood.

== Biography ==
Sara Mesa was born in Madrid in 1976 and moved with her family to Sevilla as a child, where she currently resides. She studied journalism and Hispanic philology.

== Career ==
She began her narrative work with the publication of the short story collections La sobriedad del galápago (2008) and No es fácil ser verde (2009), and the novels El trepanador de cerebros (2010) and Un incendio invisible (2011), the latter of which won the Málaga Novel Award. She was later a finalist for the Herralde Prize with Four by Four (2013), a novel set in an elite boarding school. Since then, all her work has been published in Spain by Editorial Anagrama, with English translations published by Open Letter in the US and Peirene in the UK.

Critical and popular recognition grew especially after Scar (2015), a novel that explores a strange long-distance relationship and received RNE's “Ojo Crítico” Award, followed by the short story collection Bad Handwriting (2016) and the novel Among the Hedges (2018), about the bond between a 14-year-old girl and an older man.

Her best-known novel, Un amor (2020), was named Book of the Year by El País, translated into eighteen languages. This controversial novel about a young woman who decides to move to a small village was a finalist for the European Strega Prize and the Dublin Literary Award, and was adapted into a film by director Isabel Coixet starring Laia Costa.

Subsequently, she published The Family (2022), a novel that received the Premio Cálamo Extraordinario and the Andalucía de la Crítica Award, which narrates a peculiar family story from multiple perspectives based on her own family, as well as Examination (2025), a critique of bureaucracy based on the author's own experience working in the public administration.

== Themes and style ==
Sara Mesa explores the complexity of everyday relationships from unusual and unsettling angles. Some recurring themes include abuses of power, challenges to authority, the search for freedom in the world of children and adolescents, and the rules and regulations that suppress individuality. Her literary style has been praised for her ability:

> “to create intriguing, disturbing, even terrifying atmospheres without losing touch with the recognizable; probing, poking, delving into incidents, scenarios, and emotions, giving her characters a deep psychological dimension—as chilling as can be” (Manuel Hidalgo, ); “a prose of disconcerting clarity, concise, agile” (Nadal Suau, ).

== Other works ==
She is also the author, along with writer Pablo Martín Sánchez, of Agatha (La uÑa RoTa, 2017), a book in which each author writes their version of a story sketched by Herman Melville, and Perrita Country (Páginas de Espuma, 2021), an illustrated text by artist Pablo Amargo about the strangeness of living with animals.

In 2019, she published Silencio administrativo, an essay on bureaucratic cruelty towards people in extreme poverty based on a real case.

== Bibliography ==
=== Novels ===
- El trepanador de cerebros (2010). The Trepanner.
- Un incendio invisible (2011; re-edited 2017). An Invisible Fire.
- Cuatro por cuatro (2012). Four by Four, trans. Katie Whittemore (Open Letter, 2020).
- Cicatriz (2015). Scar, trans. Adriana Nodal-Tarafa (Dalkey Archive, 2017).
- Cara de pan (2018). Among the Hedges, trans. Megan McDowell (Open Letter, 2021).
- Un amor (2020). Trans. Katie Whittemore (Open Letter, 2023).
- La familia (2022). The Family, trans. Katie Whittemore (Open Letter, 2027).
- Oposición (2025)

=== Short story collections ===
- La sobriedad del galápago (2008). The Sobriety of the Terrapin.
- No es fácil ser verde (2009). It's Not Easy to Be Green.
- Mala letra (2016). Bad Handwriting, trans. Katie Whittemore (Open Letter, 2022).

=== Poems ===
- Este jilguero agenda (2007). This Goldfinch Agenda.

=== Essays ===
- Silencio administrativo: La pobreza en el laberinto burocrático (2019). Administrative Silence: Poverty in the Bureaucratic Labyrinth.

== Awards and honors ==
- 2007 - Premio Nacional de Poesía Miguel Hernández, for Este jilguero agenda
- 2011 - Premio Málaga de Novela, for Un incendio invisible
- 2016 - Premio Ojo Crítico de Narrativa, for Cicatriz
- 2017 - Premio Literario Arzobispo Juan de San Clemente, for Cicatriz
- 2021 - Premios de los libreros (ficción), for Un amor
