= Galofre =

Galofre is a surname. Notable people with the surname include:

- Baldomer Galofre (1845–1902), Spanish painter
- Julio Galofre (born 1987), Colombian swimmer
- Pol Galofre (born 1987), Spanish activist
