= Nolwenn (given name) =

Nolwenn is a feminine given name. Notable people with the name include:

- Nolwenn Leroy (born 1982), French singer-songwriter and musician
- Nolwenn Korbell (born 1968), French singer-songwriter
- Nolwenn Le Blevennec (born 1983), French journalist
