= Pessoa (magazine) =

Online literary magazine

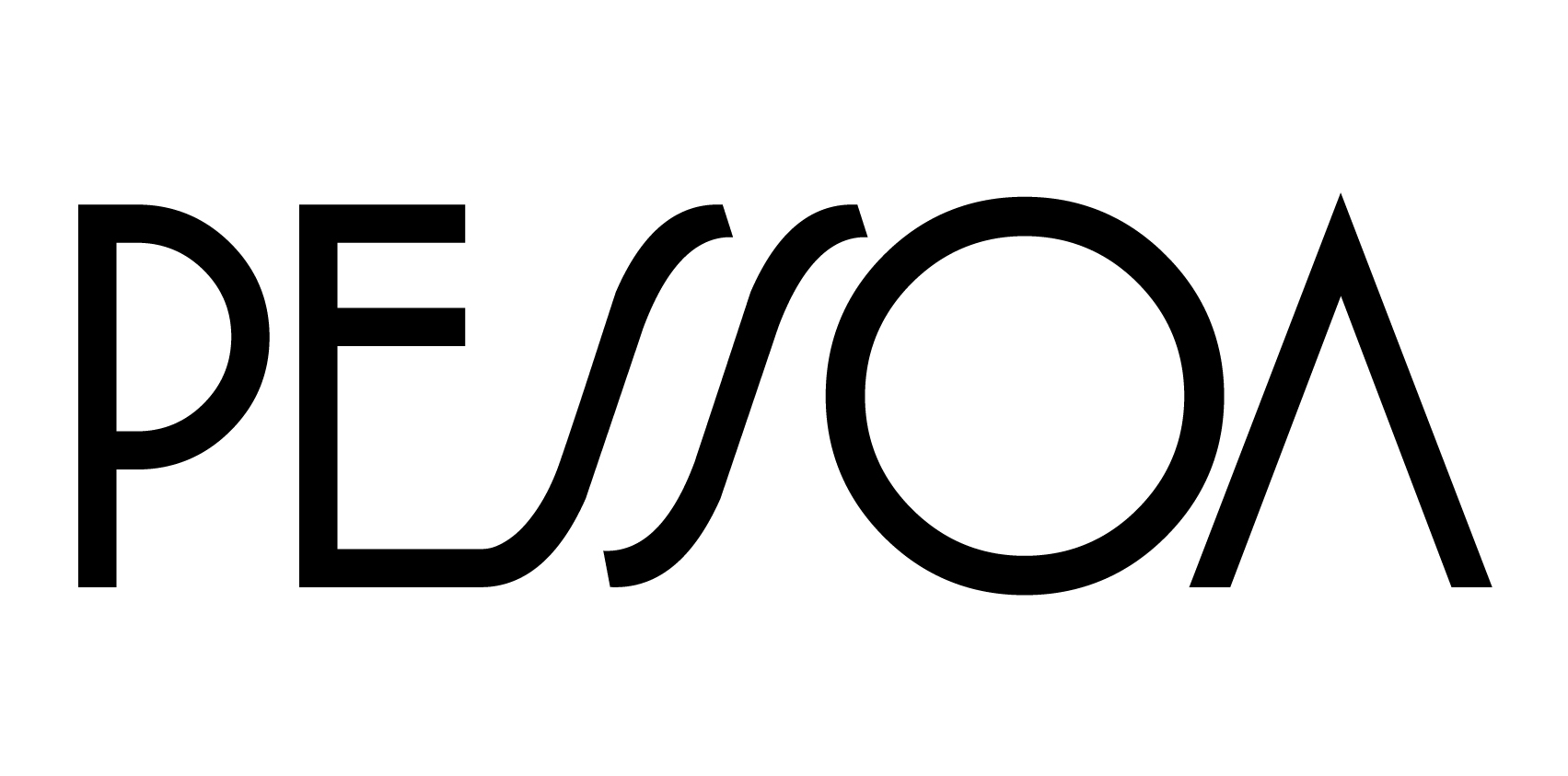
- Categories: Online literary magazine
- Founder: Mirna Queiroz
- Founded: 2010; 15 years ago
- Country: Brazil
- Based in: São Paulo
- Language: Portuguese
- Website: www.revistapessoa.com

Pessoa is an online literary magazine that publishes poetry, short-stories, drama, interviews, essays, and book reviews, besides covering the Lusophone literature market. Founded in 2010 and published by Mombak, its editor-in-large is Mirna Queiroz. It is based in São Paulo, Brazil with a branch in Lisbon, Portugal. In 2019 the magazine won the IPL Retratos da Leitura Award, Media category.

== History ==
Pessoa magazine was founded by journalist and editor Mirna Queiroz and launched at the 2010 São Paulo International Book Biennial, with support by the Official Press of the State of São Paulo. The title pays homage to Portuguese poet Fernando Pessoa. In an interview to Lusa, the Portuguese news agency, Mirna Queiroz underlined that:

"Above all the magazine aims to encourage reading, we want to bring literature to the reader, especially the most distant groups who do not have access to public facilities, either for lack of opportunity or knowledge."

In 2012 Pessoa discontinued its printed version and became an online only platform.

In October 2016, the Valor Econômico newspaper highlighted the magazine as "one of the most innovative and plural initiatives in the literary scene in recent years."

In 2018 the magazine reached 280,000 readers worldwide.

== Notable contributors ==
Many Lusophone writers have published in Pessoa or have been interviewed by the magazine, such as Ferreira Gullar, Gonçalo M. Tavares, Manuel Alegre, Luiz Ruffato, Valter Hugo Mãe, Milton Hatoum, Tatiana Salem Levy or Djaimilia Pereira de Almeida. The magazine is also recognized by the high profile of its essay and op-ed contributors who write about literary/cultural, political, and social topics. They include Alison Entrekin, Eloésio Paulo, Manuel Jorge Marmelo, Noemi Jaffe, Elvira Vigna, Nilma Lacerda, Ronaldo Bressane, Tiago Novaes, Josélia Aguiar, Juliano Garcia Pessanha, Victor Heringer, Isabel Lucas, Alice Sant'Anna.

== Curators ==
All work published in Pessoa is reviewed by editors Carlos Henrique Schroder (short-stories), who is also the magazine’s associate editor, Heloisa Jahn (poetry) and João Cezar de Castro Rocha (Literatura Brasileira Hoje).

== E-books ==
In 2014 Pessoa and Mombak began the publication of e-books. One collection – Latitudes – edited by author Maria Valéria Rezende, brought attention to five local Brazilian writers and made it to Amazon's Top 1 best-selling e-books in Brazil.

In the same year, Mombak gathered short-stories and poems published in Pessoa throughout the year. Edited by Luiz Ruffato the two anthologies were published in e-book. The first - Desassossego - published short-stories by Cíntia Moscovich, Susana Moreira Marques, Luiz Roberto Guedes, Carlos Quiroga, Monique Revolution, Vanessa Ribeiro Rodrigues, Marta Barbosa, Sergio Leo, Márcia Barbieri, Rafael Gallo, Alexandre Staut, André de Leones, Carlos Henrique Schroeder, Daniel Antônio, Astier Basílio, Tiago R. Santos, José Luiz Passos, Maurício de Almeida and Wladyr Nader. The second anthology - Fingimento - published poems by Donizete Galvão, Ronaldo Cagiano, Victor Heringer, Antonio Barreto, Iacyr Anderson de Freitas, Eloésio Paulo, Ana Martins Marques, Moacir Amâncio, José de Assis Freitas Filho, Vera Lúcia de Oliveira, Tércia Montenegro, Adriana Lisboa, Mariana Ianelli, Camila do Valle and Dora Ribeiro.

== Anthologies ==
In 2015 Pessoa began publishing annual anthologies (in French, English and Arabic) of Brazilian writers. The first anthology, with 27 authors (prose, poetry, children's and drama), was presented at the 2015 Salon du livre de Paris and the 2015 Boston Book Festival. The publication was edited by Université Paris-Sorbonne’s literature professor Leonardo Tonus. In 2019, an anthology of 12 authors in Arabic was presented at the Abu Dhabi International Book Fair, supported by the Abu Dhabi Department of Culture & Tourism's Kalima Project for Translation.

== Events ==
Pessoa regularly organizes events in Brazil and abroad to encourage reading or to promote Portuguese-language literature, including sessions at the Salon du livre de Paris, Abu Dhabi International Book Fair or Boston Book Festival, in partnership with academic institutions such as Paris-Sorbonne University, Abu Dhabi Department of Culture & Tourism, Massachusetts Institute of Technology (MIT) or Boston University. Events in Brazil have been organized with Sesc, the Culture Secretariat of the State Government of São Paulo, and Blooks Bookstore, among other institutions.

== Partnerships ==
Pessoa is an associate member of the Boston Literary District, America’s first Literary Cultural District. In 2015 Pessoa and Worldreader, a U.S. non-profit organization with the mission of "providing digital books to children and families in the developing world", signed a partnership making Pessoa’s content available for free. It was Worldreader’s first partnership with a Lusophone media partner. In 2016, a new partnership was announced with Words Without Borders aiming at the exchange of selected works with the ultimate goal of generating greater global visibility for American and Lusophone authors.
