= Manuel Medina =

Manuel Medina is the name of:

- Manuel Medina (boxer) (born 1971), Mexican boxer
- Manuel Medina (cyclist) (born 1976), Venezuelan professional racing cyclist
- Manuel Medina (politician) (born 1935), Spanish politician
- Manuel Hidalgo Medina (born 1968), medical oncologist
- Manuel D. Medina (born 1955), tech entrepreneur in Florida
