= Barbal =

Barbal is a Catalan surname. Notable people with the surname include:

- Jaime Hilario Barbal (1898–1937), Catalan Roman Catholic saint
- Maria Barbal (born 1949), Catalan writer
