= Ruffato =

Ruffato is an Italian surname. Notable people with the surname include:

- Clodovaldo Ruffato (born 1953), Italian politician
- Luiz Ruffato (born 1961), Brazilian author
