= Lina Munar Guevara =

Colombian writer and lawyer (born 1996)

Lina Munar Guevara (born 1996) is a Colombian writer and lawyer. She was born in Bogotá and studied law at Uniandes. She has also completed an MFA in Creative Writing at NYU.

Munar Guevara is best known for her 2022 novel Imagina que rompes todo (Imagine breaking everything). The novel received critical praise, and has been translated into English by Ellen Jones for Peirene Press. Munar Guevara's short fiction has appeared in anthologies, for example, in Through the Night Like a Snake: Latin American Horror Stories (2024).
