= Angélique Villeneuve =

French writer

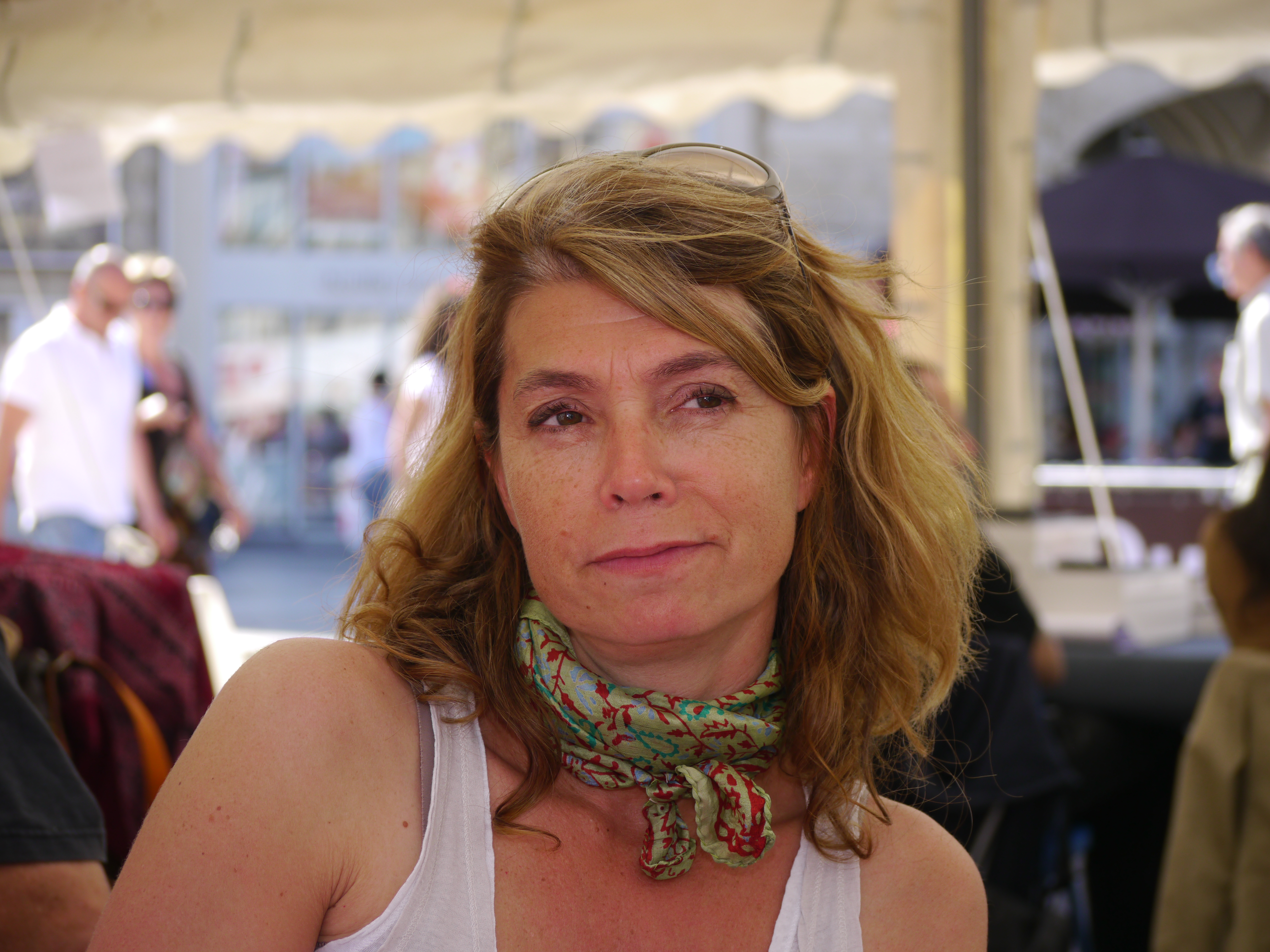
Angélique Villeneuve, 2011

Angélique Villeneuve (born 1965) is a French writer. She was born in Paris and lived in Sweden and India before returning to France. She has written eight novels as well as numerous books for children. She is best known for her novel Les Fleurs d’hiver (Editions Phébus, 2014) which won a raft of literary prizes:

- the 2014 Prix Millepages
- the 2015 Prix La Passerelle
- the 2015 Prix de la Ville de Rambouillet
- the 2016 Prix du Livre de Caractère de Quintin.

The book has been translated into English by Adriana Hunter and published by Peirene Press. She also won the SGDL Grand Prix for her 2018 novel Maria. Her recent work, La Belle Lumière, is a fictional account of the life of Helen Keller’s mother.
