= Pol Galofre =

Pol Galofre Molero
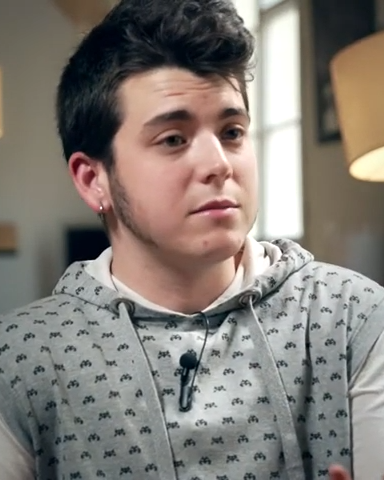
- Born: 1987 (age 38–39)
- Education: Escola Superior de Cinema i Audiovisuals de Catalunya
- Occupations: Sound technician, teacher, activist, filmmaker
- Employer: Autonomous University of Barcelona
- Spouse: Bel Olid
- Children: 1

Pol Galofre Molero (born 1987) is a trans and feminist activist from Catalonia. He is a sound technician, graduated in film and audiovisual studies from the Escola Superior de Cinema i Audiovisuals de Catalunya (ESCAC) and specialized in visual arts and documentary cinema. He is also a teacher in the Master's Degree in Gender and Communication at the Autonomous University of Barcelona, and facilitator of cultural spaces aiming to break the gender binary.

== Activism ==
Since 2005, he has been actively involved in the trans and feminist movement in Barcelona, coordinating projects such as Cultura Trans (driven alongside other activists like Miquel Missé) and Espai Trans. He has worked as a trainer on sexual and gender diversity from an intersectional perspective, facilitator at the Barcelona LGTBI Center, and lecturer at the UAB and Espai DebuT, among others.

In 2015, together with Brigitte Vasallo, he developed the project "TransRaval" addressing gentrification, homonationalism, and queer Islam, which took form at the Arts Santa Mònica Center through debates, talks, and film screenings. He also collaborated with Bel Olid on the project "Ser libre", which won an award at the 2015 Ingràvid Festival and was exhibited at the same center.

== Personal life ==
In June 2020, Bel Olid, who already had two children from a previous relationship and had married Galofre the year before, announced on Twitter that Pol was pregnant with the phrase “My husband is pregnant!” In an interview with Ara where he discussed his pregnancy and reproductive rights of trans people, he explained that as a gestational father and trans man, his experience with the public healthcare system had been positive.

He also had support from the Trànsit service for trans people, founded by Rosa Almirall, who was also his gynecologist. Because he had not changed his sex marker on the DNI, unlike other trans men like Rubén Castro from Madrid, he did not encounter issues when referred to gynecology.

His parenthood announcement coincided with Spain’s debate on a trans law to ensure gender self-determination, which was passed in June 2022. Pol and Bel declared their intention to raise their child in a gender-neutral manner, avoiding imposed gender expectations. In a 2021 interview, Pol discussed his pregnancy process, physical changes, postpartum, public breastfeeding, and his role as a father. He explained that at age 18, he chose breast reduction instead of mastectomy because he knew he wanted to get pregnant and breastfeed in the future. To avoid reproducing patriarchal structures, they raised the child non-binarily, using gender-neutral language and avoiding imposed femininity or masculinity.

== Works ==
In the audiovisual field, he created the documentary short Feines per gent valenta (2015) for the Barcelona City Council, and co-directed Les coses que importen (2016), awarded at the Dona’m Cine festival. As a sound designer, he worked on the documentary EnFemme by anthropologist Alba Barbé i Serra, about the cross-dresser community in Barcelona. He also contributed to Serás hombre, directed by Isabel de Ocampo, a documentary that examines current machismo and gender-based violence.

He has written for outlets like Pikara Magazine and Idem, and co-authored essays and one children’s book:

- Trans Politics: An Anthology of Texts from North American Trans Studies. Barcelona/Madrid. Egales Editorial, 2016. (With Miquel Missé)
- "Prosthesis", in Barbarismos queer y otras esdrújulas. Barcelona. Edicions Bellaterra, 2017
- The Extra-Bombastic Adventures of Frederica Bladuliqui (and the Perverse Ximplumstimflins). Barcelona. Animallibres, 2020. (With Bel Olid and illustrations by Màriam Ben-Arab)
- "Passing, how complicated!", in TRANS*sexualities: Support, Health Factors and Educational Resources. Edicions Bellaterra. (R./Lucas Platero and others)
- (h)amor^{6} trans. Continta me tienes, 2021. (R./Lucas Platero and others)
