= Selja Ahava =

Finnish writer (born 1974)

Selja Ahava (born 1974) is a Finnish writer. She studied scriptwriting in Helsinki, and has written scripts for film, TV and radio. Her debut novel The Day the Whale Swam through London (Eksyneen muistikirja) appeared in 2010, followed by Things That Fall from the Sky (Taivaalta tippuvat asiat) which was nominated for the prestigious Finlandia Prize. This book also won the EU Prize for Literature, and has been translated into English by Emily Jeremiah and Fleur Jeremiah. Her third book Before My Husband Disappears (Ennen kuin mieheni katoaa) appeared in 2017 to wide acclaim. Her fourth book The Woman Who Loved Insects (Nainen joka rakasti hyönteisiä) was published by Gummerus in 2020.

She lived in London for a few years before settling down in Porvoo, a town outside Helsinki.
