= Victor Heringer =

Brazilian author (1988–2018)

- Born: Victor Doblas Heringer; March 27, 1988; Rio de Janeiro, Brazil
- Died: March 7, 2018 (aged 29); Rio de Janeiro, Brazil
- Education: Federal University of Rio de Janeiro
- Occupations: Author, translator
- Writing career
- Language: Portuguese
- Years active: 2009–2018
- Genres: Novel, poetry, crônica
- Notable works: Glória (2012); O Amor dos Homens Avulsos (2016)
- Notable awards: Prêmio Jabuti (2013)

Victor Doblas Heringer (March 27, 1988 – March 7, 2018) was a Brazilian Prêmio Jabuti-winning novelist, translator, cronista and poet, famous for his novels Glória (2012) and O Amor dos Homens Avulsos (2016).

== Biography ==
Victor Doblas Heringer was born on March 27, 1988, to a family of German descent in Rio de Janeiro, in the bairro (neighborhood) of São Cristóvão, but was raised in Nova Friburgo. Graduated in Literature from the Federal University of Rio de Janeiro, before publishing his first books he worked at the Moreira Salles Institute and at the Fundação Casa de Rui Barbosa after obtaining a scholarship for the latter. Between 2014 and 2017 he had a weekly column in the magazine Pessoa, and also periodically wrote for the Pernambuco-based magazine Continente, among many others.

Heringer published his debut novel, Cidade Impossível, through Editora Multifoco in 2009, which was followed by 2011's poetry collection Automatógrafo. In 2012, his critically acclaimed second novel Glória, about a "plastic artist searching for an impossible woman", came out, for which he was awarded the prestigious Prêmio Jabuti the following year. Heringer's third novel, O Amor dos Homens Avulsos, was released in 2016 through Companhia das Letras, and tells the story "of two boys who fall in love with each other, but have their passion interrupted by a tragedy"; it was nominated for the Prêmio Rio de Literatura, the São Paulo Prize for Literature and the Prêmio Oceanos. He claims that the fictional carioca neighborhood of Queím, in which the novel takes place, was inspired by the real-life neighborhood of Del Castilho, where he used to visit his grandmother when he was a kid, as well as by his childhood memories of Rio's North Zone as a whole.

Heringer's final work to be published during his lifetime was a translation to Portuguese of Loung Ung's 2000 memoir First They Killed My Father, which came out in Brazil in 2017 through HarperCollins. The same year, he was included by Forbes Brasil in their "UNDER 30 in Literature" list, and one of his poems was featured in the anthology É Agora como Nunca, edited by singer Adriana Calcanhotto.

Throughout most of his life Heringer struggled with depression. On March 7, 2018, three weeks prior to his 30th birthday, he was found dead near his apartment in Copacabana following an apparent suicide by self-defenestration. On June 9, 2018, his publisher Companhia das Letras announced that, as a tribute to him, they would re-issue all of his works; they had already re-published his first novel Glória some months prior, and a volume of his complete poetry, containing previously unpublished pieces and originally announced for a 2019 release, eventually came out in 2024. In one of his final interviews, from October 2017, he stated that he was working on a fourth novel, scheduled to be published in 2018 and inspired by his travels across South America, India and Indonesia, but it is unknown if he was able to finish it prior to his death.

A posthumous collection containing seventy of Heringer's crônicas, Vida Desinteressante, came out through Companhia das Letras in 2021; it was nominated for another Prêmio Jabuti the following year. An English translation of O Amor dos Homens Avulsos was published by Peirene Press on July 11, 2023, following an earlier translation to Italian by Safarà Editore. The English translation was a finalist for the 2023 John Leonard Prize given by the National Book Critics Circle.

In 2024, Peirene published an English translation of Glória. In early 2025, O Amor dos Homens Avulsos was translated into French for Éditions Denoël.

In a 2024 interview for newspaper O Globo, screenwriter Maria Camargo expressed her desire to adapt O Amor dos Homens Avulsos into a full-length film.

== Bibliography ==
Novels

- Cidade Impossível (Multifoco, 2009)
- Glória (7Letras, 2012; re-issued by Companhia das Letras in 2018)
- O Amor dos Homens Avulsos (Companhia das Letras, 2016)

Poetry

- Automatógrafo (7Letras, 2011)
- Não Sou Poeta: Poesia Reunida (Companhia das Letras, 2024; posthumous)

Translation

- First They Killed My Father (HarperCollins, 2017 (Note: Released in Portuguese as Primeiro Mataram Meu Pai))

Crônicas

- Vida Desinteressante: Fragmentos de Memórias (Companhia das Letras, 2021; posthumous)

=== Translations ===
Heringer's works have been translated:

- L'amore degli uomini soli (in Italian). Translated by Vincenzo Barca. Pordenone: Safarà Editore. 2023. ISBN 978-8-8321-0749-4.
- The Love of Singular Men. Translated by James Young. London: Peirene Press. 2023. ISBN 978-0-8112-3747-5.
- Glória. Translated by Sophie Lewis; James Young. London: Peirene Press. 2024. ISBN 978-1-9086-7085-4.
- L'Amour des hommes singuliers (in French). Translated by Hélène Mélo. Paris: Éditions Denoël. 2025. ISBN 978-2-2071-8077-8.
