= Meike Ziervogel =

German novelist and publisher

- Born: 1967 (age 58–59); Germany
- Occupations: Author and publisher
- Writing career
- Notable works: Magda, Clara's Daughter, Kauthar, The Photographer

Meike Ziervogel (born 1967, Germany) is a German novelist, publisher, journalist and humanitarian based in Beirut, Lebanon. She set up the British independent publishing house Peirene Press in 2008, which received multiple award nominations and accolades from notable European news agencies. Ziervogel continues to write whilst working as the CEO of award-winning Alsama Project, a Middle East-based education NGO she co-founded in 2020.

== Life ==
Ziervogel was born in 1967 in Kiel in Germany and grew up in Schleswig-Holstein and Hessen. She came to London in 1986 to study Arabic language and literature. She received Bachelor and Master of Arts degrees from The School of Oriental and African Studies. She speaks German, English, Arabic and French. Meike is married and has two children, a daughter and a son. Ziervogel's family, notably her parents and grandparents, were displaced from their home in modern-day Poland, due to the political climate at the end World War II.

== Work ==
After graduation, Ziervogel worked as a journalist for Reuters in London and Agence France-Presse in Paris. In 2008 she founded Peirene Press, an award-winning independent UK publishing house specialising in contemporary European fiction in English translation. In 2012 Meike was voted as one of Britain's 100 most innovative and influential people in the creative and media industries for the hClub 100 list devised by Time Out London and the Hospital Club. Following then, Ziervogel has authored 5 novels. Her work often explores family dynamics, perceptions of reality, and plot lines.

In 2020, Ziervogel co-founded Alsama Project, where she is currently CEO. Under her leadership, Alsama Project runs education centres for out-of-school refugee and displaced youth in the Middle East. Most of its students join Alsama Project illiterate, and within 5 months 95% of them are literate.

As of March 2022, she stepped down as director of Peirene Press, following seven International Booker Prize nominations under her leadership, to focus more on her non-profit work with Alsama.

=== Novels ===
Ziervogel published her debut novel, Magda, in 2013. She wrote this novel as a fictionalized biography of Magda Goebbels, wife of Nazi Propaganda Minister Joseph. Magda was shortlisted for the Guardian's Not the Booker prize and nominated as a book of the year 2013 by the Irish Times, Observer and Guardian readers. The book was released in Polish translation in January 2015 and reached Number 6 in the Polish national bestseller list on the same month. Magda has also appeared in German, Catalan and Italian translation. The German version of Magda was translated by Martin Thomas Pesl and published by Atilier Éditions in Vienna.

Ziervogel's second novel Clara's Daughter was published to critical acclaim in September 2014. Her third novel, Kauthar, was released in August 2015, followed by her fourth novel, The Photographer, in 2017 and her fifth novel, Flotsam, in April 2019. During this time, from 2009 to 2018, she hosted the Peirene literary Salon. Meike Ziervogel's books are published in the UK by Salt Publishing and have been translated into German, Italian, Polish and Catalan.

In 2025, Ziervogel published her sixth novel, Shams, which explores life in a refugee camp – focusing on female resilience in the face of exploitation, war, poverty and tragedy. The novel draws on Ziervogel's own experience of working with displaced women and girls in Shatila through Alsama Project.

== Awards and honours ==
- Time Out and The Hospital Club hClub100 list 2012: The 100 most innovative and influential people in the British creative and media industries
- Irish Times Books of the Year, 2013
- Observer Books of the Year, 2013
- Guardian Readers' Books of the Year, 2013
- Guardian's Not the Booker Prize, 2013 (Shortlist)

== Selected works ==
- Magda. Salt Publishing. 2013. ISBN 978-1-907-77340-2.
- Clara's Daughter. Salt Publishing. 2014. ISBN 978-1-907-77379-2.
- Kauthar. Salt Publishing. 2015. ISBN 978-1-784-63029-4.
- The Photographer. Salt Publishing. 2017. ISBN 978-1-784-631147.
- Flotsam. Salt Publishing. 2019. ISBN 978-1-784-631789.
- Shams. Salt Publishing. 2025. ISBN 978-1-78463-348-6.
