= Manuel Hidalgo =

Manuel Hidalgo may refer to:

- Manuel Hidalgo (composer) (born 1956), Spanish composer
- Manuel Hidalgo (footballer) (born 1999), Malaysian footballer
- Manuel Hidalgo Medina, U.S. oncologist
- Manuel Hidalgo Plaza (1878–1967), Chilean trade union leader and politician
- Manuel Hidalgo Ruiz (born 1953) Spanish journalist and writer, involved in the history of Spanish journalism
