= Andrea Lundgren =

Swedish writer (born 1986)

Andrea Lundgren (born 1986) is a Swedish writer. She was born and raised in the town of Boden in Norrbotten, in the far north of Sweden.

She made her debut in 2010 with the novel I tunga vintrars mage. Her second novel Glupahungern followed four years later. In 2018, Glupahungern was dramatized by Ellenor Lindgren and premiered at Västerbottensteatern. It then went on tour around Sweden.

Also in 2018 came her first collection of short stories, Nordic Fauna, which received glowing reviews and won domestic literary prizes such as Tidningen Vi:s litteraturpris and Samfundet de Nios vinterpris. An English translation has been published by Peirene Press.
