= Aki Ollikainen =

Finnish writer (born 1973)

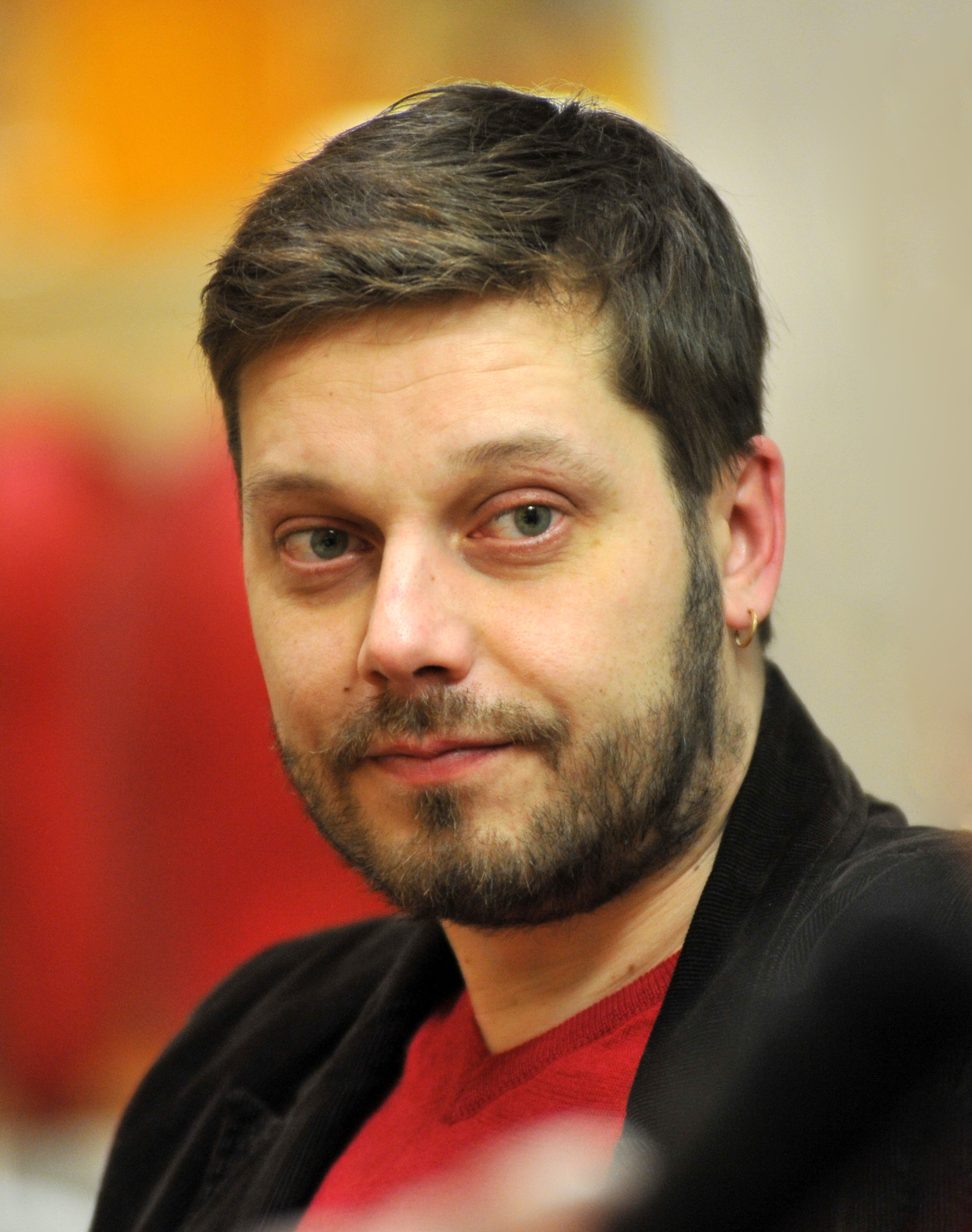
Ollikainen in 2012

Aki Ollikainen (born 1973) is a Finnish writer. A photographer and journalist by profession, Ollikainen received widespread acclaim for his debut novel Nälkävuosi (2012), an account of the Finnish famine of 1866–1868. The book won several prizes and has been translated into English by Emily Jeremiah and Fleur Jeremiah under the title White Hunger (Peirene Press, 2015).

Ollikainen lived in Kolari in northern Finland when he wrote Nälkävuosi. His second novel Musta satu was published in spring 2015. He currently lives in Lohja in Southern Finland.
