= The Man I Became =

Book by Peter Verhelst

- First edition
- Author: Peter Verhelst
- Original title: Geschiedenis van een berg
- Language: Dutch
- Genre: Fiction
- Publisher: Prometheus
- Publication date: 2013
- Publication place: Belgium
- English publication date: 2016
- Media type: Print, e-book
- Pages: 119 pages
- ISBN: 9789044622867 First edition, Dutch language

The Man I Became (Original title: Geschiedenis van een berg) is a fictional work written by Dutch postmodernist writer Peter Verhelst. It is translated from the Dutch by David Colmer. The satirical work focuses on modern society's excessive materialism and individualism. Set primarily in a location known as "Dreamland", an amusement park designed to integrate animals into a human society, the story is told from the perspective of an unnamed captive gorilla as he progresses through the trials of becoming human.

== Plot synopsis ==
Verhelst's novel opens in the first-person narrative of a young gorilla. The narrator and his family are captured from their home in the jungle by poachers. The family is chained together and forced to march to an unknown destination, with some members dying from the harsh conditions of the journey. The caravan eventually reaches a coast where the prisoners are crowded into a ship and sent on a long journey overseas. Finally, the ship reaches a large, man-made facility, where the family is divided by gender. The narrator, along with the other males, learns to speak and act like a human from a human trainer. After the completion of their training, the group joins many other animals of multiple species for their final test: a cocktail party. At this party, all the animals mingle and dance with their new human skills.

Following the party, the narrator is brought to a sort of amusement park, "Dreamland", where the animals are assigned various human jobs based on their capabilities. The narrator gradually gains trust from the higher-ranked humans, eventually obtaining a position training animals himself. He gains enough trust from his supervisors to earn a badge showing his rank as fully human, where he is promoted to a management position and a nice apartment. However, the narrator soon begins to notice some suspicious activity among the humans at the park, leading to an impromptu, frenzied investigation of suspicious shipments of animals. This investigation peaks with a devastating fire that destroys the park – the cause of which is unknown. The narrator ends up with a mindless job in the financially devastated city near the park, where he eventually befriends Lucia, the daughter of Dreamland's owner, and comes to live with her. The novel closes with an image of Lucia in front of a sunset.

== Literary elements ==
=== Genre ===
Verhelst is one of the most prominent writers of Flemish Postmodernism. Flemish Postmodernism characteristically criticizes modern society as well as contemporary thinking in general, which can be seen in The Man I Became's satirical tone with the subjects of smartphones, emphasis on small-talk, and corporate life as the narrator becomes increasingly integrated into human society.

=== Themes and allegory ===
The narrator's abduction from the jungle is highly reminiscent of the Atlantic slave trade. They are chained and brought upon a grueling sea journey in the brig of a ship where they are all packed together and eventually separated. The narrator and the other animals are subjected to constant training exercises with severe punishments for failure. This scenario is described through a confused narration, paralleling many stories told from the perspective of slavery. These themes can also be seen as a reflection of slavery to the digital world and social structure in the corporate sphere.

Satire is one of the primary literary techniques of the work, as The Man I Became satirizes the parts of human culture that are often viewed as negatives by postmodern standards. The narrator is placed against his will in a society of other animals trying to play the game of social interaction through small talk to gain notoriety and ascend the ranks to become fully human. This goal of achieving true humanity is what takes away the narrator's own identity, as he is stripped away from his life in the jungle as a gorilla, to be trained to follow the human rules of Dreamland. This is Verhelst's way of pointing out the way in which contemporary society strips individuals of their individuality. It also invokes criticism of animals being forced to perform in circuses and other events.

=== Style ===
Verhelst's narrative style in the novel blends unnatural narratology and cognitive narratology. Verhelst layers the unnatural human narration with the cognitive experience of a non-human animal. Verhelst uses a blend of these two narration styles to best represent the first-person perspective of a gorilla. In other words, while Verhelst's protagonist is not human, he blends its non-human experiences with human narration and emotions to create an unlikely relatable character. Additionally, Verhelst utilizes short chapters throughout the novel, creating a sense of frenzy and dream-like storytelling from his narrator.

=== Characters ===
- The Narrator, who remains unnamed throughout the whole novel
- His family
- the human, who teaches the animals how to become a human. He teaches them to smile, converse, speak, write, etc.
- The Head, he owns dreamland
- The Girl, later known as Lucia
- Emily, a girl who the narrator has a relationship with that does not last very long. The reason for their breakup is never properly explained, but the narrator believes that Emily had to go home again

== Publication information ==
The Man I Became was originally published in Dutch by Uitgeverij Prometheus as Geschiedenis van een berg during 2013 in both print and e-book format. An English translation by David Colmer was released in 2016 by Peirene Press in print and e-book format.

== Critical reception ==
Critical reception for The Man I Became has been mostly positive. The novel has received both criticism and praise for its plot style. The Oxford Review described the plot as Verhelst's narrator posing vague questions about the nature of humanity that remain unanswered, which they found both frustrating and fascinating, as well as integral to the story's form. In a review for The Guardian, Nicholas Lezard compared the work to Will Self’s Great Apes and James Lever’s Me Cheeta, stating that it "seems at first to be a not-too-sophisticated satire on humanity" but that it was ultimately a "haunting, apocalyptic novella, supremely and deliberately difficult to pin down".

In a review for the original Dutch version, De Volkskrant's Arjan Peters felt that the book was longer than it needed to be as the narrator's mature morality was clear early on and that it felt like a children's book that was stretched out for adult audiences. A reviewer for NRC Handelsblad was also critical, stating that they saw the narrator as too mature for an ape that has only just joined humanity and that this felt like a cliche Verhelst should have avoided.

=== Awards ===
- PEN Translates Award (2015, won)
