= François Dermaut =

French comics artist (1949–2020)

- Born: 9 November 1949; Roubaix, France
- Died: 19 March 2020 (aged 70)
- Occupation: Comic book artist

François Dermaut (9 November 1949 – 19 March 2020) was a French comic book artist. He is particularly well known for the series Les Chemins de Malefosse.

== Biography ==
Dermaut studied drawing at the Institut Saint-Luc de Tournai. He began his career at Éditions Aredit-Artima. In 1971, he moved to Paris, where, after an unsuccessful contract with Bayard Presse, he held multiple jobs, notably in advertising. His career as a cartoonist began with Fleurus Presse for his publication Djin. At this time, he met cartoonists Joëlle Savey, François Bourgeon, and André Juillard. He published his works in various magazines, such as Triolo, Formule 1, Fripounet et Marisette, Tintin, and Okapi.

In 1982, Dermaut began at Glénat Editions, and, in collaboration with Daniel Bardet, published Les chemins de Malefosse, a historic comic book series. In 2001, he traveled to Santiago de Compostela, and recounted his journey in Carnets de Saint-Jacques-de-Compostelle. In 2015, Dermaut wrote the series Rosa, which he based largely on the story of Bernard Ollivier.

Dermaut worked in watercolor, a technique which required pages to dry for three days.

== Works ==
- Les Chemins de Malefosse (1983–2004)
- Souvenirs de Toussant (2003)
- Malefosse (2007–2009)
- Rosa (2015–2019)
