= Françoise Cloarec =

French writer, painter and psychoanalyst

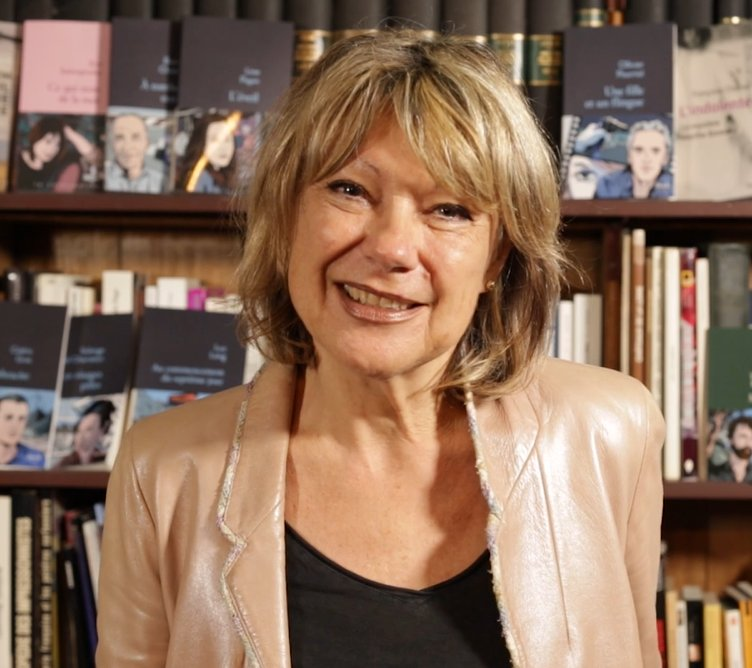
Cloarec in 2016

Françoise Cloarec (born 1957 in Paris) is a French writer, painter and psychoanalyst.

== Biography ==
After studying at the Beaux-Arts de Paris, from which she graduated in 1972, Françoise Cloarec turned to Psychoanalysis, preparing a doctorate in psychoanalysis on Séraphine Louis at Paris Diderot University, which she defended in 1984.

In addition to her work as a psychoanalyst and clinical psychologist at the Ville-Évrard hospital, she is also a painter, having exhibited at the Jardin du Luxembourg orangery in 2000.

Françoise Cloarec is also a writer. She has written several books on women artists (Séraphine Louis, Camille Claudel, Marie Laurencin), as well as novels about Syria, a country that made a deep impression on her when she discovered it in 1993 during a conference and exhibition of her paintings in Aleppo.

She became a Ordre des Arts et des Lettres in 2001, and in 2017 and 2018 was a member of the jury for the Prix Anaïs-Nin. Part of the “Montluc, Résistance et Liberté” literary prize.

== Works ==
- 1998: Bîmâristâns, lieux de folie et de sagesse, L'Harmattan, Paris
- 2000: Syrie, un voyage en soi, L'Harmattan
- 2002: Le Caravansérail, L’Harmattan, 206 p. ISBN 2-7475-2188-5
- 2003: Le Temps des consuls. L’Échelle d’Alep sous les Ottomans, L’Harmattan, 171 p. ISBN 2-7475-5410-4, 147 p. ISBN 2-296-00883-6
- 2008: Séraphine. La Vie rêvée de Séraphine de Senlis, Paris, Éditions Phébus, 172 p. ISBN 978-2-7529-0364-8.
- 2010: Storr. Architecte de l’ailleurs, Éditions Phébus, 170 p. ISBN 978-2-7529-0485-0
- 2010: Quand la mer peint, photos by Monique Pietri, Libourne, France, La part des anges éditions, 59 p. ISBN 978-2-912882-30-1
- 2013: L’Âme du savon d’Alep, photos by Marc Lavaud, Paris, Éditions Noir sur Blanc, 200 p. ISBN 978-2-88250-298-8
- 2014: De père légalement inconnu, Éditions Phébus, 148 p. ISBN 978-2-7529-0990-9
- 2016: L’Indolente. Le Mystère Marthe Bonnard, Paris, Stock, series "La Bleue", 352 p. ISBN 978-2-234-08098-0
