= Gøhril Gabrielsen =

Norwegian writer (born 1961)

Gøhril Jeanne Gabrielsen (born 14 January 1961) is a Norwegian writer. She grew up in Finnmark, but then moved to Oslo. Gabrielsen's debut novel Unevnelige hendelser (Unspeakable Events) came out in 2006 winning Aschehoug’s First Book Award. She has published several other novels, including Svimlende muligheter, ingen frykt (The Looking-Glass Sisters) 2008, Skadedyr (Vermin) 2011, Din, alltid (Yours, Always) 2015 and Ankomst (Arrival) 2017, all well received by critics. The Looking-Glass Sisters has been released in English translation by Peirene Press.

== Bibliography ==
- Unspeakable Events, 2006
- The Looking-Glass Sisters, 2008
- Vermin, 2011
- Yours, Always, 2015
- Arrival, 2017

== Awards ==
- Aschehoug’s First Book Award, 2006
- Tanums Woman Scholarship, 2008
- Amalie Skram Prize, 2016
- Havmann Prize, 2017
