= Marie Sizun =

French writer (born 1940)

Marie Sizun (born 1940) is a French writer. She taught in Germany and Belgium for many years before returning to Paris in 2001. Sizun started her career as a full-time writer after retirement, publishing her first novel Le Père de la petite (2005) at the age of 65. The book has been translated in English by Peirene Press under the title Her Father's Daughter. Sizun has won several awards for her work.

== Bibliography ==
- 2005: Le Père de la petite, Arléa
- 2007: La femme de l’Allemand, Arléa, Grand prix des lectrices de Elle
- 2008: Jeux croisés, Arléa
- 2008: Le Père de la petite, Arléa-Poche
- 2009: Éclats d'enfance, Arléa
- 2011: Plage, Arléa
- 2012: Un léger déplacement, Arléa
- 2013: Un jour par la forêt, Arléa
- 2015: La Maison-Guerre, Arlea
