= Kamal Ben Hameda =

Libyan jazz musician and writer

Kamal Ben Hameda (born 1954) is a Libyan jazz musician and writer. Born in Tripoli, he moved in his early twenties to France. He now lives in the Netherlands. Kamal has published several collections of poetry, and a novel titled La Compagnie des Tripolitaines (2012). The book was nominated for several literary prizes, and is due to appear in an English translation from Peirene Press in 2014, under the title Under the Tripoli Sky.
