= Flavia Company =

Argentine novelist and writer

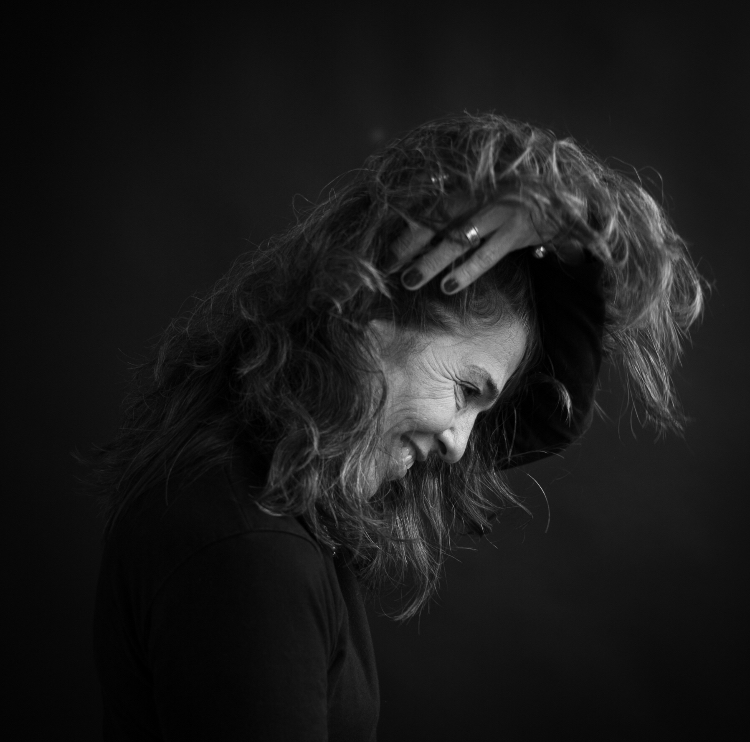
- Flavia Company by Álvaro García Isidro
- Born: September 27, 1963 (age 62); Buenos Aires, Argentina
- Writing career
- Language: Spanish and Catalan
- Genres: Fiction, short stories, poetry

Flavia Company (born 27 September 1963) is an Argentine-Spanish writer and novelist. She writes in both Spanish and Catalan. She has a degree in Hispanic Philology, is a journalist, translator, and teacher of creative writing and lecturer. She works in different genres (novel, short story, flash fiction, essay and poetry), and also publishes children's literature. She lives in Catalonia.

In June 2018, she embarked on a trip around the world that lasted four years. From that experience she wrote her book "I no longer need to be real", which she wrote under the name Haru, one of three heteronyms, together with Andrea Mayo and Osamu. Her work has been translated into English, French, Portuguese, Italian, Polish, German and Danish. She writes in the newspapers La Vanguardia and Ara.

== Bibliography ==
=== Spanish-language works ===
==== Fiction ====
- La planta carnívora. Editorial Comba, 2021. Written under the heteronym Andrea Mayo.
- Dame placer. Editorial Comba, 2021.
- Ya no necesito ser real. Catedral, 2020. Written under the heteronym Haru.
- Magôkoro. Catedral, 2019.
- Haru. Catedral, 2016.
- Querida Nélida, reedición en Ediciones La Palma, Colección EME, 2016.
- Que nadie te salve la vida. Lumen, 2012. (Editorial El Ateneo, 2020)
- La isla de la última verdad. Lumen, 2011.
- La mitad sombría. DVD Ediciones, 2006. (Editorial Evaristo, 2020)
- Ni tú, ni yo, ni nadie. Ed. Muchnik, 2002.
- Melalcor. Ed. Muchnik, 2000.
- Dame placer. Ed. Emecé, 1999. (Reedición en 2021, Editorial Comba)
- Luz de hielo. Bassarai Ediciones, 1998.
- Saurios en el asfalto. Ed. Muchnik, 1997.
- Círculos en acíbar. Ed. Montesinos, 1992.
- Fuga y contrapuntos. Ed. Montesinos, 1989.
- Querida Nélida. Ed. Montesinos, 1988.

==== Short stories ====
- Pensamientos de Haru. Editorial Koan. (Aparición en octubre de 2022)
- Teoría de la resta. Editorial Comanegra, 2022.
- Por mis muertos. Páginas de Espuma, 2014.
- Trastornos literarios. Ed. Páginas de Espuma, 2011. (Reedición revisada y con textos inéditos.)
- Con la soga al cuello. Ed. Páginas de Espuma, 2009.
- El apartamento. MobilBook/Salón Náutico, 2006.
- Género de Punto. Ed. El Aleph, 2003.
- Trastornos Literarios. Colección de microrrelatos aparecidos previamente en prensa. Ed. DeBolsillo, 2002.
- Dame placer. Mario Muchnik editor, 1999
- Viajes subterráneos. Bassarai Ediciones, 1997.

==== Poetry ====
- Yo significo algo. Stendhal Books, 2016.
- Volver antes que ir. Eugenio Cano Editor, Madrid, 2012.

=== Catalan-language works ===
==== Fiction ====
- La planta carnívora. Ed. Proa (2021). Written under the heteronym Andrea Mayo.
- Ja no necessito ser real. Univers Llibres, 2020. Written under the heteronym Haru.
- Magôkoro. Catedral, 2019.
- Haru. Catedral, 2016.
- Que ningú no et salvi la vida. Ed. Proa, 2012.
- L'illa de l'última veritat. Ed. Proa, 2010.
- Negoci Rodó. Ed. Columna, 2005.
- Melalcor. Edicions 62, 2000.
- Ni tu, ni jo, ni ningú. Premio Documenta 1997. Edicions 62, 1998.
- Llum de Gel. Edicions El Mèdol, 1996.

==== Short stories ====
- Teoria de la resta. Editorial Comanegra, 2022.
- Al teu rotllo. Ed. Cruïlla, 2015.
- No em ratllis. Ed. Cruïlla, 2012.
- L’apartament. MobilBook/Salón Náutico, 2006.
- Viatges Subterranis. Ed. El Mèdol, 1993.

==== Poetic prose ====
- Retrat de la Ràpita. Con ilustraciones de la pintora Rosa Querol. Edición del Ayuntamiento de San Carlos de la Rápita, 1996.

==== Children's literature ====
- Societat Kyoto. Ed. Cruïlla, 2019.
- El llibre de les preguntes. Ed. Cruïlla, 2016.
- Dóna-hi la volta. Ed. Cruïlla, 2016.
- Una gàbia, un tresor i unes sabatilles vermelles. Editorial La meva Arcàdia 2014.
- Els ambigú i el cas de la mòmia. Ed. Cruïlla. Col. El Vaixell de Vapor, 2014.
- Els Ambigú i el cas de l'estàtua. Ed. Cruïlla. Col. El Vaixell de Vapor, 2010.
- Un perill sota el mar. Ed. Cruïlla. Col. El Vaixell de Vapor, 2009.
- Estels Vermells. Ed. Cruïlla. Col. El Vaixell de Vapor, 2008.
- Gosigatades. Ed. Animallibres, 2007.
- L’espai desconegut. Ed. Cruïlla. Col. El Vaixell de Vapor, 2006.
- El missatge secret. Ed. Cruïlla. Col. El Vaixell de Vapor, 2004.
- L’illa animal. Ed. Cruïlla. Col. El Vaixell de Vapor, 2003.
- El llibre màgic. Ed. Cruïlla. Col. El Vaixell de Vapor, 2001.

=== Translated versions ===
- L'isola dell' ultima verità (La isla de la última verdad) Traducción al italiano, Italia. Edizioni E/O, 2013. Traducción de Stefania Ciminelli.
- The island of last truth, Europa Editions, New York, 2012.
- Com a corda no pescoço (Con la soga al cuello) Traducción al portugués, Brasil. Ed. Cubzac, 2011. Traducción de Luís Carlos Cabral.
- Die Insel der letzten Wahrheit (La isla de la última verdad) Traducción al alemán, Ed.Berlin Verlag, 2011. Traducción de Kirsten Brandt.
- A mitade sombria (La mitad sombría) Traducción al portugués, Brasil. Ed. Cubzac. Enero 2008. Traducción de Ana Lima Cecilio.
- "Diario", del libro de cuentos Género de Punto. Seleccionado para la antología "Crossing Barcelona", al alemán, 2007. Ed. Sammlung Luchterland. Traducción de Hanna Grzimek.
- Viajes subterráneos, cuentos. Traducción al polaco. 1999.
- Ni tú ni yo ni nadie, traducción por la autora del catalán al castellano. Ed. El Aleph, 2003.
- Dame Placer, traducción al holandés, Ed. De Geus, (2002).
- Dá-me Prazer, traducción al portugués de Serafim Ferreira, Ed. Difel, 2001.
- Donne-moi du plaisir, traducción al francés de Claude Bleton, Ed. Flammarion, 2001.
- Luz de Hielo (novela; traducción por la autora al castellano de Llum de Gel,). Ed. Bassarai, 1998.
- Viajes subterráneos (cuentos; traducción al castellano de Viatges Subterranis, por Ignacio Navau, con la revisión y las correciones de la autora.) Ed. Bassarai, 1997.

== See also ==
- Lists of writers
