= Duanwad Pimwana =

Thai novelist, poet and journalist

Pimjai Juklin (Thai: พิมใจ จูกลิ่น; born 1969), known by her pen name Duanwad Pimwana (เดือนวาด พิมวนา), is a Thai novelist, poet and journalist. The winner of the 2003 S.E.A Write Award for her novel Changsamran, she is one of Thailand's best-known writers.

== Biography ==
Born to a family of farmers, she attended a vocational school and worked as a journalist at a local newspaper. She published her first short story at the age of twenty and quickly gained recognition, earning awards from PEN International Thailand and the Thai literary magazine Chorkaraket. She currently lives in her native seaside province of Chonburi, located on the Thai east coast.

Pimwana's Arid Dreams, Pimwana's debut in English translation, is a collection of short stories that explores the daily lives of ordinary Thais.

== Reception ==
Lily Meyer at NPR writes:

Duanwad Pimwana is one of Thailand's preeminent female writers. She's beloved for her writing across forms, but especially acclaimed for her short fiction, translated for the first time in the excellent 13-story sampler Arid Dreams....[Her] skill at creating multiplicity makes her mastery clear. Each of her stories poses its own moral challenge, pleasurable and unsettling at once. Taken together, they are a phenomenal puzzle to read.

== Selected works ==
in English translation

- Arid Dreams (2019). Translated by Mui Poopoksakul. New York: Feminist Press.
- Bright (2019). Translated by Mui Poopoksakul. San Francisco: Two Lines Press.
