= Peter Verhelst =

Flemish writer

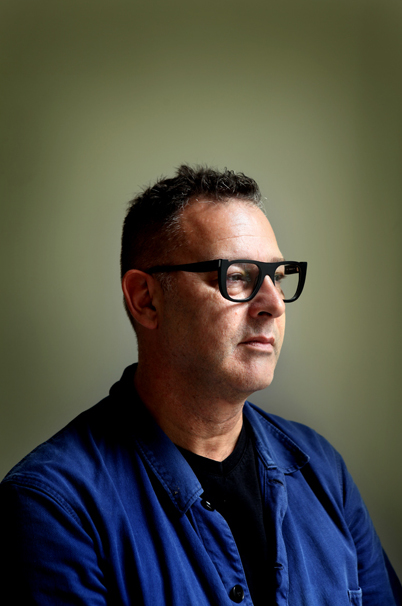
- Peter Verhelst in 2017 (Photo by Filip Naudts)
- Born: 28 January 1962 (age 64); Bruges, Belgium
- Occupations: dramatist, novelist, poet

Peter Verhelst (born 28 January 1962) is a Belgian Flemish novelist, poet and dramatist. He won the Ferdinand Bordewijk Prijs for Tongkat.

== Life ==
Peter Verhelst was born in Bruges, Belgium. In his youth, he was extremely interested in books, reading atlases and encyclopaediae, as well as novels, and writing poetry from the age of 16.

While a teacher in Dutch, English and History, he debuted in 1987 with the poem Obsidiaan, with his first novel - Vloeibaar harnas - following in 1993. Thereafter, he worked as a teacher at the Institute for Food in Bruges, quitting in 1999 to begin writing full-time. In 2000, he won the prestigious Gouden Uil (Golden Owl) and Young Gold Owl (Jonge Gouden Uil), a literary prize for Belgian literature in the Dutch language. He also started working as a playwright, with his first play completed in 1997.

In 2016 he won the Ida Gerhardt Poëzieprijs for his poetry book Wij totale vlam (2014). In 2019 he has got the Confituur Boekhandelsprijs, granted by the association of independent Flemish book dealers, for his essay book Voor het vergeten. He won the Constantijn Huygens Prize in 2021 for his lifetime achievements.

Verhelst currently lives and works in Bruges, Belgium.

== Important works ==
=== Poetry ===
- Obsidiaan (1987)
- OTTO (1998)
- Angel (1990)
- Witte Bloemen (1991)
- Master (1992)
- De Boom N (1994)
- Verhemelte (1996)
- Verrukkingen (1997)
- Alaska (2003)
- Nieuwe sterrenbeelden (2008)
- Zoo van het denken (2011)
- Wij totale vlam (2014)
- Zing Zing (2016)
- Koor (2017)
- Wat ons had kunnen zijn (2018)
- Zon (2019)
- 2050 (2021)

=== Prose ===
- Vloeibaar harnas (1993)
- Het spieren alfabet (1995)
- De kleurenvanger (1996)
- Tongkat (1999)
- Zwellend fruit (2000)
- Memoires van een Luipaard (2001)
- Mondschilderingen (2002)
- Zwerm (2005)
- Huis van de Aanrakingen (2010)
- De allerlaatste caracara ter wereld (2012)
- Geschiedenis van een berg (2013)
- De kunst van het crashen (2015)
- De zeer vermoeide man en de vrouw die hartstochtelijk van bonsai hield (2016)
- Voor het vergeten (2018)

=== Theater ===
- Maria Salomé (1997)
- Romeo en Julia (studie van een verdrinkend lichaam) (1998)
- Red Rubber Balls (1999)
- S*ckmyp (2000)
- AARS! (2000)
- Scratching the inner fields (2001)
- Philocrates (2002)
- Het sprookjesbordeel (2002)
- Blush (2002)
- Sonic Boom (2002)
- Icarus/Man-o-War (2002) CREW Eric Joris
- Philoctetes Fortify My Arms (2003) CREW Eric Joris
- Crash (2004) CREW Eric Joris
- Terra Nova (2011) CREW Eric Joris
- Absence (October 2015) CREW Eric Joris and NTGent

== See also ==
- Flemish literature
