= Virve Sammalkorpi =

Finnish writer

Virve Sammalkorpi (born 1969) is a Finnish writer. She was born in Helsinki and attended the University of Helsinki. Her first book Sinkkuleikki was nominated for the Helsingin Sanomat Prize in 1999. In 2003, she was nominated for the Runeberg Prize for Metsän keskellä maja. Paflagonian perilliset (2016) won the Savonia Literature Prize and has been translated into English by Peirene Press.
