= Nolwenn Le Blevennec =

French journalist and writer

Nolwenn Le Blevennec is a French journalist and writer, born in 1983. She is editor-in-chief at l'Obs, formerly known as Le Nouvel Observateur, and lives in Paris.

She has published two works of fiction to date: Les Amies (Gallimard, 2023) and La Trajectoire de l’aigle (Gallimard, 2021). Les Amies was translated into English under the title Friends and Lovers by Peirene Press. La Trajectoire de l’aigle was also published by Peirene Press and translated under the title As the Eagle Flies. Both novels were translated into English by Madeleine Rogers.
