= Bernard Ollivier =

French journalist and writer

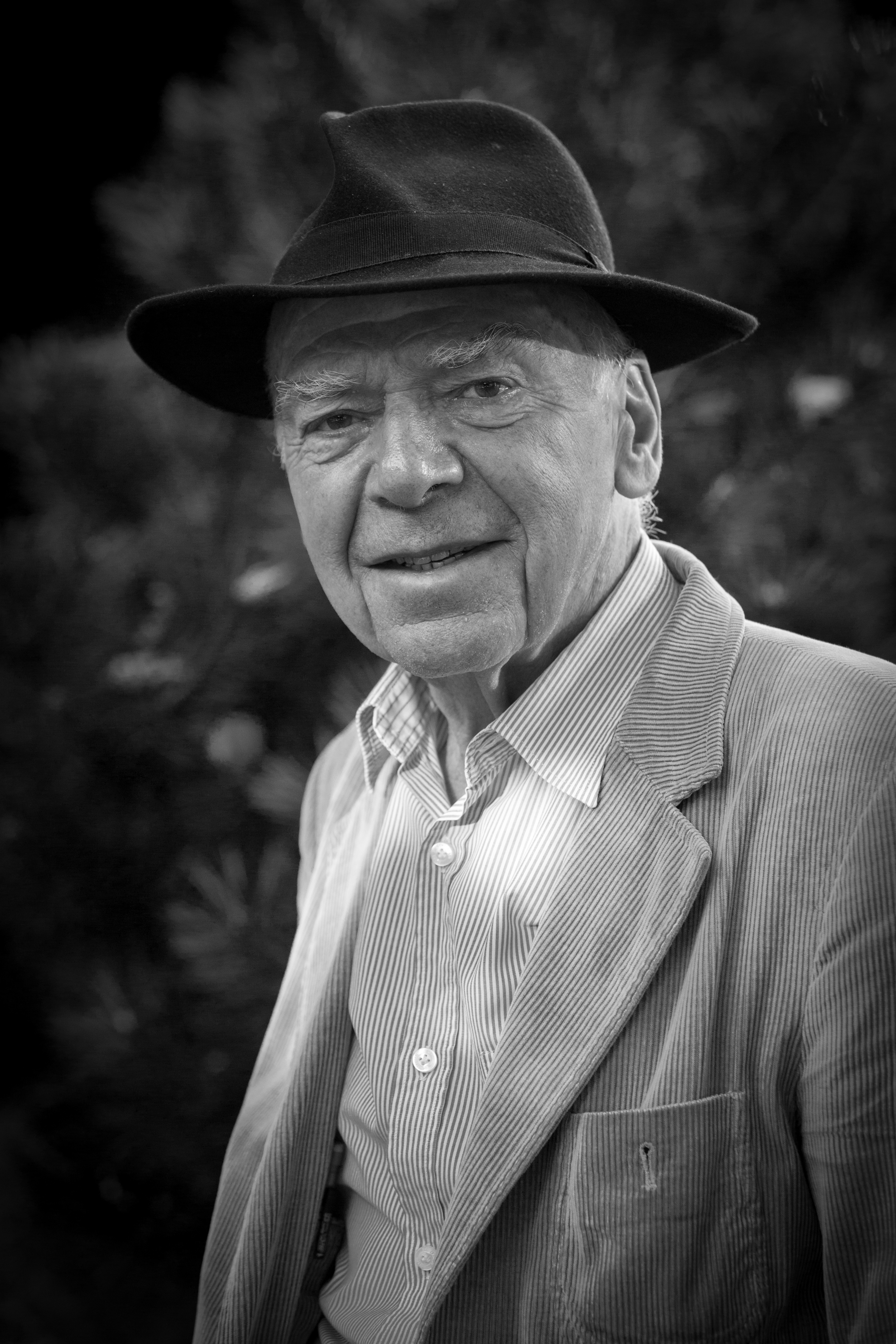
- Bernard Ollivier in 2015
- Born: 1938 (age 87–88); Manche, France
- Occupations: Journalist; Writer

Bernard Ollivier (born 1938) is a French journalist and writer, known in particular for his travel stories and as founder of the Seuil Association, a non-profit organization based in France, which seeks to reintegrate young people through walking.

== Life ==
Born in Manche, Ollivier led a career as a political and economic journalist. Upon retirement, he fell into a deep depression. Hoping to shake himself out of it, he decided to walk the Way of St James, from Paris to Santiago de Compostela, Spain. The experience of walking transformed him. By the end of the journey, realizing he wanted to continue walking, he had decided to embark on a long 12,000 km walk from Istanbul, Turkey, to Xi'an, China, along the Great Silk Road. He completed the journey in four separate trips and published the tale in three volumes, the "Longue marche" series. The travel trilogy has been extremely popular in France and has been translated into several other languages, including English. Although he has also published short stories including a collection on the homeless, several longer works of fiction, his best-known works focus on travel. The success of the first volume of Longue marche (Traverse l'Anatolie) enabled him to found the Seuil Association, the goal of which is the reintegration of troubled young people into society by taking long, cellphoneless and chaperoned walks in foreign countries. After meeting Bénédicte Flatet on a canoe trip down the Loire River, he embarked with her on a walk across Europe, from Lyon, France, to Istanbul, Turkey, completing, in a sense, his Silk Road journey at 75 years of age. The pair recount their adventures in an unanticipated fourth volume to the Longue marche series, Suite et fin, published in 2016. In 2019, Ollivier founded an environmental organization—Air.e—in collaboration with Bénédicte Flatet. Air.e's objectives include promoting awareness of the climate crisis and establishing self-sustaining villages. To this end, the association has organized two "Marches pour demain" (Walks for Tomorrow) in Brittany, France, the first in 2021 and the second scheduled for July 2022.

== Publications in French ==
- Longue marche: à pied de la Méditerranée jusqu'en Chine par la route de la soie, Phébus, 4 volumes, volume I, Traverser l'Anatolie (2000); volume II, Vers Samarcande (2001); volume III, Le vent des steppes (2003). (Prix Joseph-Kessel 2001). Volume IV, Longue marche, suite et fin (2016).
- Nouvelles d’en bas, 2001. Fiction about the homeless in the métro.
- L’allumette et la bombe, 2007. An essay on the suburbs after the 2005 French riots and description of the methods of his association.
- Carnets d’une longue marche, 2005, watercolors by François Dermaut and texts by Bernard Ollivier, revisiting Ollivier's walk along the Silk Road.
- Aventures en Loire, Phébus, 2009. A 1000 km trip by foot and canoe along the Loire River.
- La vie commence à 60 ans, 2012. Life begins at 60: Ollivier's memoirs in a sense, recounting the why and how of his walking adventures and exploring what it means in modern society to "retire."
- Histoire de Rosa qui tint le monde dans sa main, 2013. A fictional novel.
- Sur le chemin des ducs : la Normandie à pied, de Rouen au Mont-Saint-Michel, 2013.
- Marche et invente ta vie : adolescents en difficulté, ils se reconstruisent par une marche au long cours, Arthaud, 2015. The story of the Seuil Association.
- L'Essence de la Vie : Ils quittent la ville pour vivre de la terre, Arthaud, 2019. Interviews conducted with city dwellers who have decided to live a more ecological life by moving to the countryside, sometimes taking up farming.

== Translations in English ==
- Out of Istanbul (2019), Skyhorse Publishing.
- Walking to Samarkand (2020), Skyhorse Publishing.
- Winds of the Steppe (2020), Skyhorse Publishing.
- Back to Istanbul (2023), Skyhorse Publishing.
- Life Begins at Sixty. (In progress).

=== Bibliography ===
- Payot, Marianne (7 May 2012). "Aventures en Loire, par Bernard Ollivier" [Adventures in the Loire, by Bernard Ollivier]. L'Express (in French).
- Albouy, Gérard (2001). "Bernard Ollivier, pas à pas sur les Routes de la Soie" ["Bernard Ollivier, step by step on the Silk Roads]. Le Monde (in French). Archived from the original on 11 March 2016.
- Perrin, Jean-Pierre (2001). "La vie devant soie" [Life before silk / Life out in front of you]. Libération (in French). Archived from the original on 12 April 2015.
- Savigneau, Josayne (2001). "Nouvelles d'en bas, de Bernard Ollivier" [News from below, by Bernard Ollivier]. Le Monde (in French).
