= Gil Jouanard =

French writer (1937–2021)

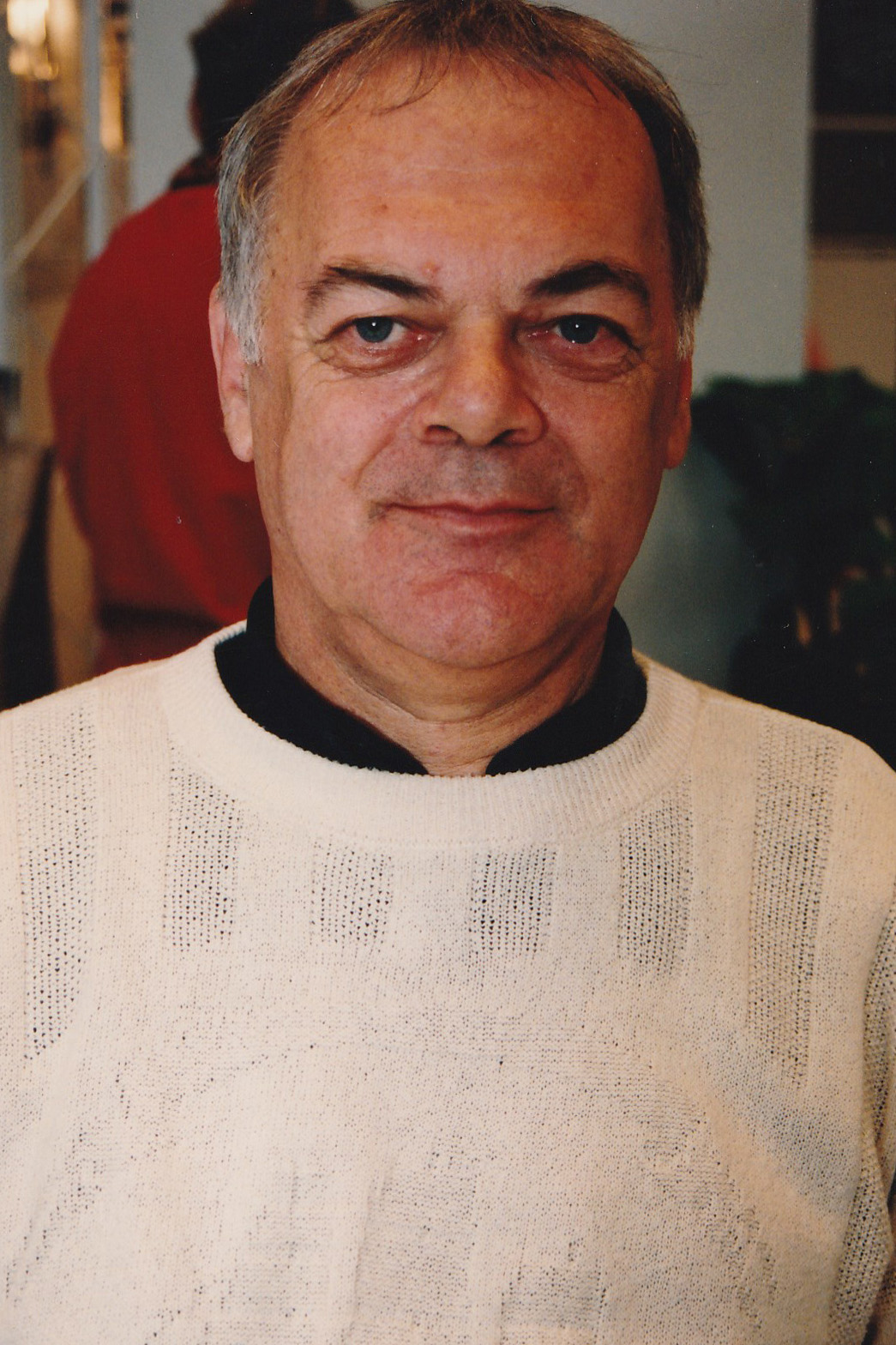
- Gil Jouanard at the International Geography Festival
- Born: 11 December 1937; Avignon, France
- Died: 25 March 2021 (aged 83)
- Occupation: Writer

Gil Jouanard (11 December 1937 – 25 March 2021) was a French writer. His ability was discovered by René Char.

== Biography ==
Jouanard began his career in the field of journalism, a profession he practiced from 1962 to 1965. He covered the early days of independent Algeria from 1963 to 1964, and covered authors for an encyclopedia until 1974. He then served as director for cultural and informational activities at the Théâtre National de la Criée in Marseille from 1975 to 1977.

Throughout his career, Jouanard lived in Dieburg, Avignon, Paris, Oran, Hamburg, Marseille, Villeneuve-lès-Avignon, Montpellier, and Abbeville. In Villeneuve, he founded a writers' residence in association with the Centre national du livre. He founded the Fête du livre d'Aix-en-Provence, which he directed from 1977 to 1979. In 1986, he founded the Centre régional des lettres du Languedoc-Roussillon in Montpellier, which he directed for over 20 years.

Gil Jouanard died on 25 March 2021 at the age of 83.

== Bibliography ==
- Banlieue d'Aerea (1969)
- Diaclases (1970)
- Poèmes hercyniens (1972)
- L'Absent de l'indicatif (1973)
- Hautes Chaumes (1975)
- L'Odeur verte (1980)
- Lentement à pied — à travers le Gras de Chassagne (1981)
- Sous la dictée du pays (1982)
- Jours sans événement
- Un corps entier de songes (1985)
- L'Eau qui dort (1987)
- Lisières, marches et confins (1989)
- Le Moindre mot (1990)
- Savoir où (1992)
- Aires de transit (1992)
- L'Œil de la terre (1994)
- Le Goût des choses (1994)
- Bonjour monsieur Chardin ! (1994)
- Plutôt que d'en pleurer (1995)
- Au Maramureṣ (1996)
- L'Envergure du monde (1996)
- Crépuscule musical (1996)
- D'après Follain (1997)
- C'est la vie (1997)
- Le Jour et l'Heure (1998)
- Tout fait événement (1998)
- Le Causse en hiver (1999)
- Mémoire de l'instant (2000)
- L'Envergure du monde (2001)
- Les Arcs de Saint-Pierre (2001)
- Maramures, terra incognita (2002)
- Cela seul (2002)
- Le Connemara, pays de l'imaginaire (2002)
- Un nomade casanier (2003)
- Paris villages (2003)
- La Saveur du monde (2004)
- Les Sabots de sept lieues (2004)
- Moments donnés (2005)
- Untel (2005)
- Le Bois de Païolive (2005)
- Istanbul (2005)
- Prague (2005)
- Venise au clair obscur (2006)
- Marseille revisitée (2008)
- La Boîte aux lettres de Palmyre (2009)
- L'Œil circonspect (2009)
- La Plus Belle Eau (2009)
- De la Baltique aux Balkans (2013)
- Dans le paysage du fond (2013)
- De la Baltique aux Balkans (2013)
- Voyage à Païolive en Ardèche Méridionale (2013)
- Les Roses blanches (2016)
- Celui qui dut courir après les mots (2018)
- Au fil des jours au gré du causse (2019)
