= Asko Sahlberg =

Finnish novelist

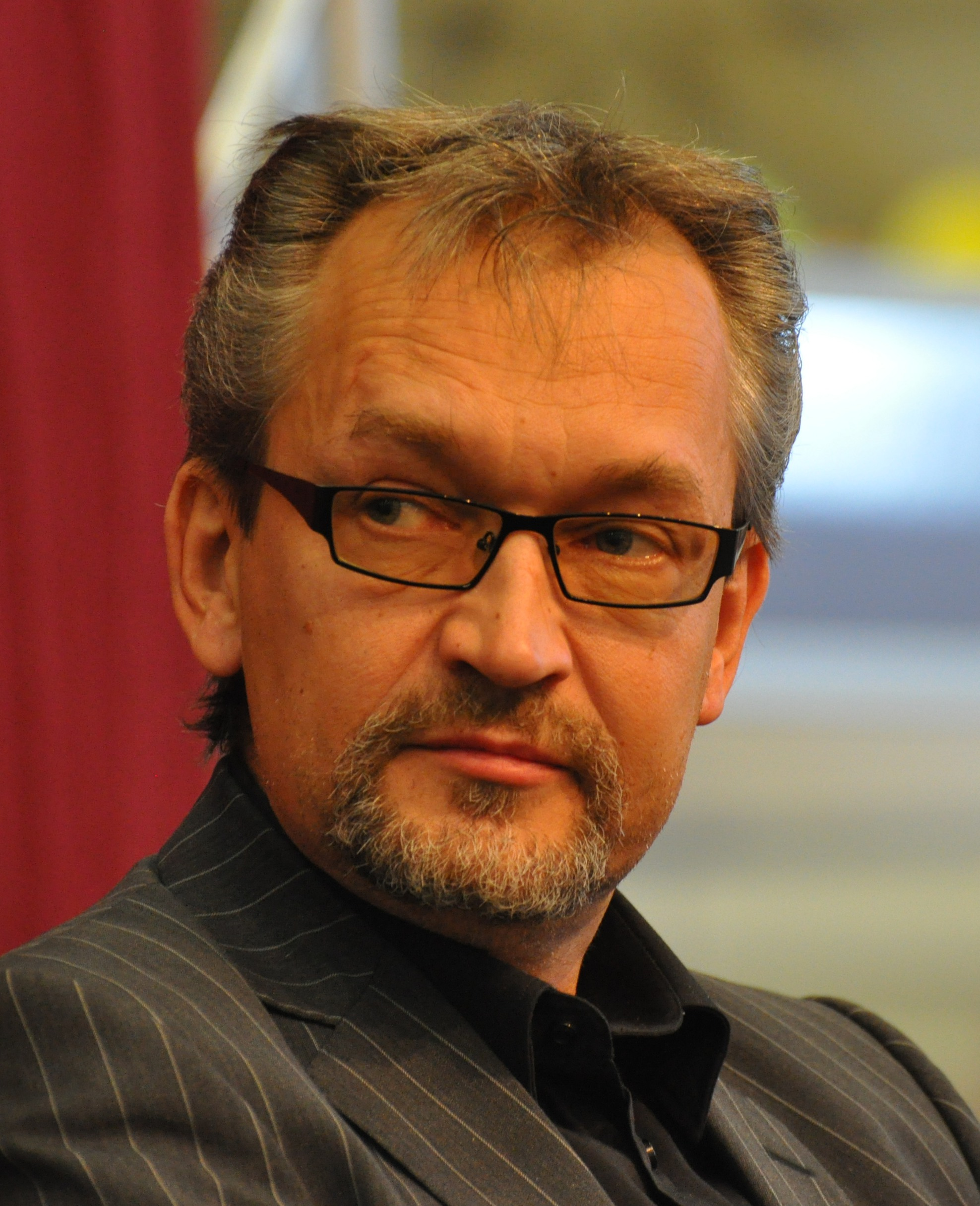
Sahlberg in 2013

Asko Tapio Sahlberg (born 30 September 1964) is a Finnish novelist. Since the publication of his debut novel in 2000, he has written several more novels, including The Brothers (2010), an English translation of which has been released by Peirene Press. Sahlberg has lived in Gothenburg, Sweden since 1996, and was chosen as the Sweden Finn of 2014.
