= Kristina Carlson =

Finnish novelist (1949–2026)

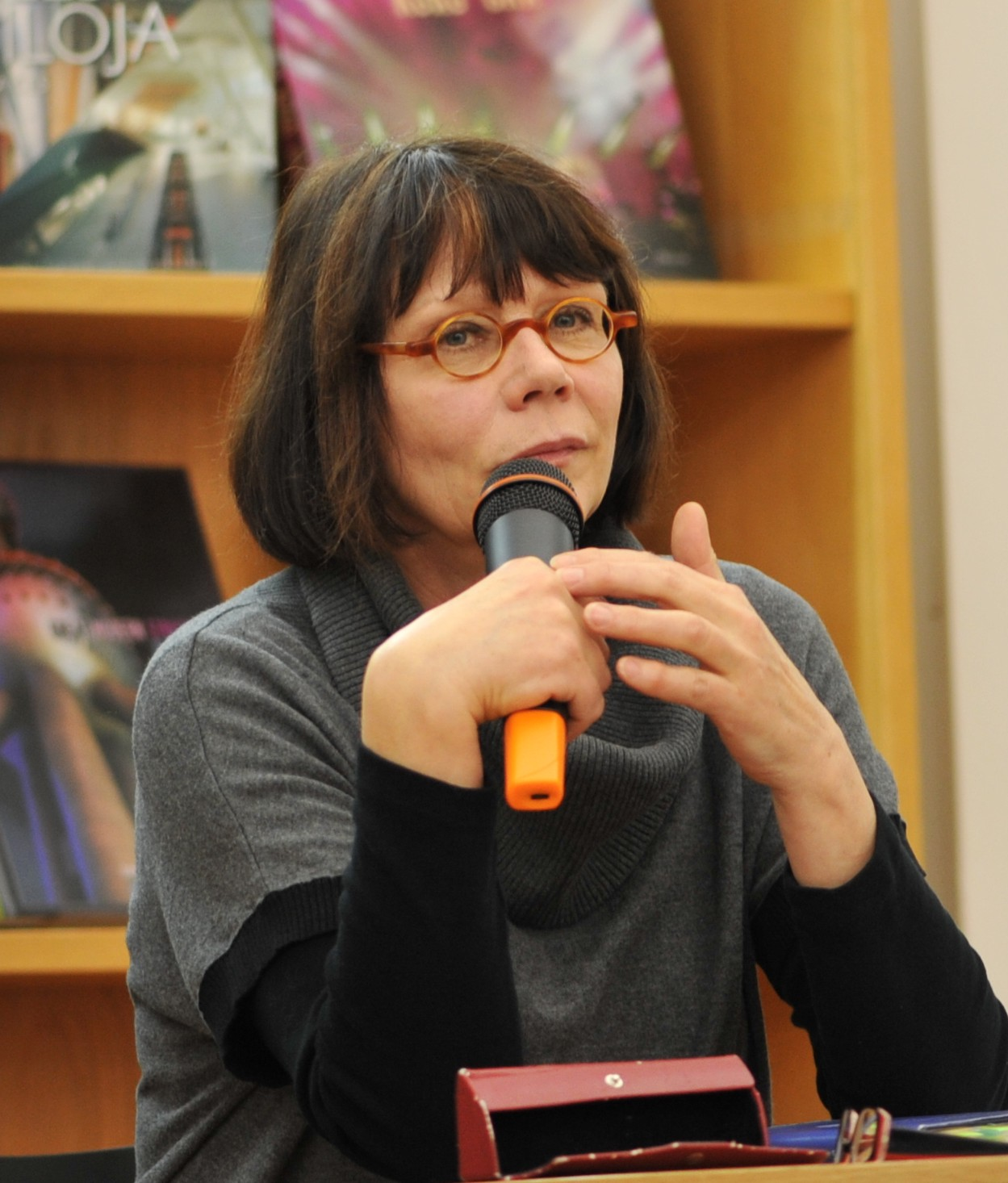
Kristina Carlson in 2009

Anna Kristina Carlson (31 July 1949 – 28 July 2026), also known by her pen name Mari Lampinen, was a Finnish novelist, poet and writer.

== Life and career ==
Carlson was born in Helsinki on 31 July 1949. Her novels include Maan ääreen, Herra Darwinin puutarhuri and William N. Päiväkirja. She also wrote several books for young adults under the pen name Mari Lampinen. Carlson died on 28 July 2026 in Helsinki, at the age of 76.

== Bibliography ==
=== As Kristina Carlson ===
- Hämärän valo (1986)
- Maan ääreen (1999; winner of Finlandia Prize for Fiction)
- Herra Darwinin puutarhuri (2009; published in the UK as Mr Darwin's Gardener, 2013)
- William N. Päiväkirja (2011)
- Eunukki (2020, published in the UK as Eunuch, 2023)

=== As Mari Lampinen ===
- Anni ja haaveiden loma (1996)
- Anni Kaukolan kartanossa (1996)
- Annin uudet ystävät (1996)
- Annin ensi-ilta (1997)
- Anni ja yllätystäti (1997)
- Anni ja lumienkeli (1997)
- Annin Pariisin kevät (1997)
- Anni ja karkulainen (1998)
- Anni tien päällä (1998)
- Anni, Abigail ja Dagda (1998)
- Anni ja Joona (1998)
- Annin uusi vuosi (1999)
