= Luiz Ruffato =

Brazilian writer

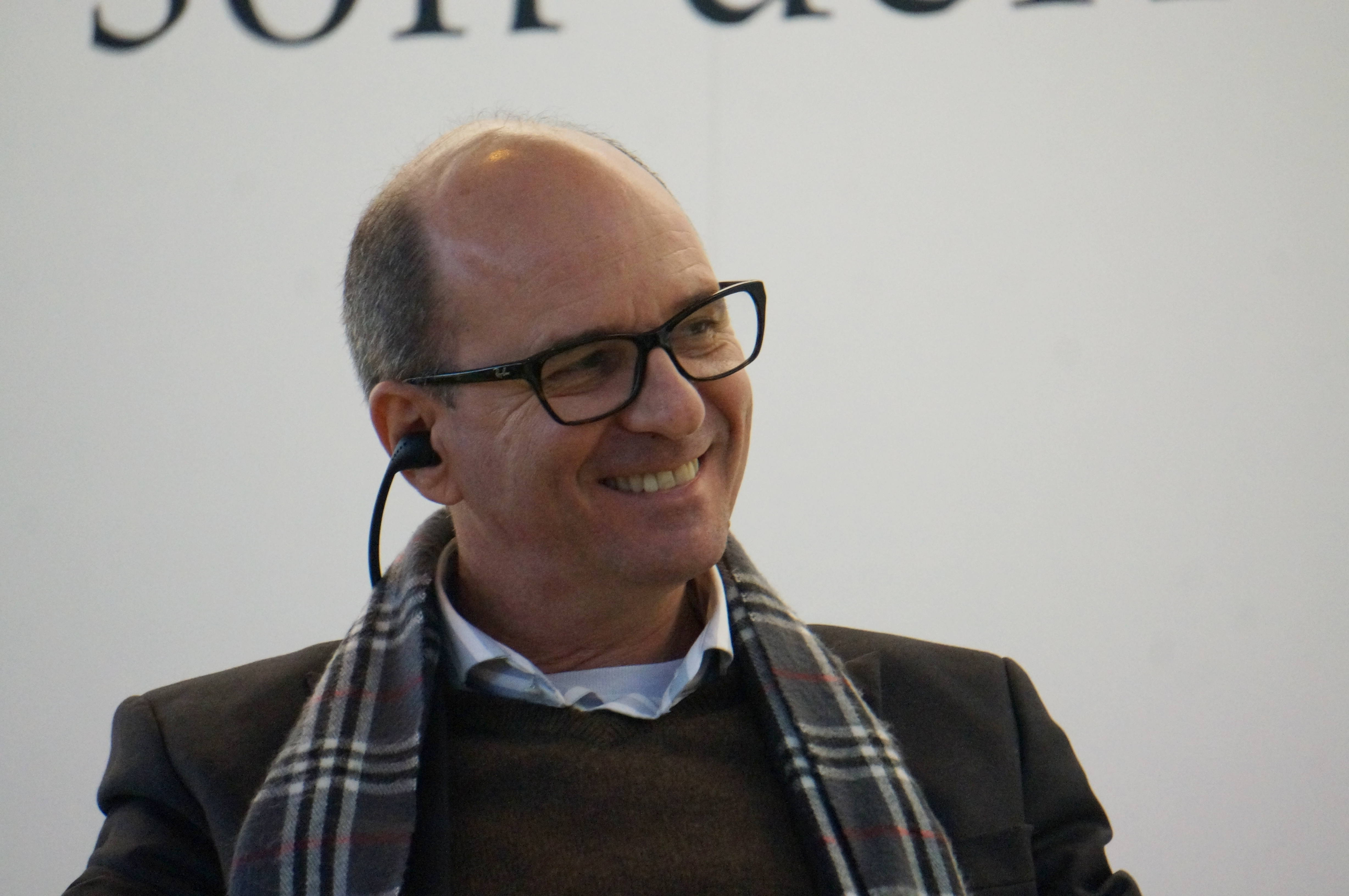
- Ruffato in 2015
- Born: February 4, 1961; Cataguases, Brazil
- Education: Federal University of Juiz de Fora
- Occupations: Journalist and writer
- Writing career
- Language: Portuguese
- Period: Contemporary
- Genre: Novelist
- Notable works: Eles eram muitos cavalos (They were many horses); Estive em Lisboa e Lembrei de Você (I was in Lisbon and remembered you); "Temporary Hell"
- Notable awards: Casa de las Américas Troféu APCA Prêmio Machado de Assis

Luiz Fernando Ruffato de Souza (born February 1961) is a contemporary Brazilian writer. Ruffato worked as a journalist in São Paulo and has published two short story collections and a number of novels. Ruffato's debut novel, Eles eram muitos cavalos (They were many horses) (2001) won an APCA literary prize. The fifth book, Domingos sem Deus (2011), in his series Temporary Hell won the Casa de las Américas Prize in 2013. In 2012, Ruffato became a Writer in Residence at the Center for Latin American Studies at UC Berkeley.

== Early life and education ==
Luiz Ruffato was born in Cataguazes, Brazil in February 1961 into a working-class immigrant family. His mother was a Portuguese washerwoman and his father an Italian popcorn salesman, Ruffato had an apprenticeship as a salesman in Cataguases before moving to Juiz de Fora in the Brazilian state of Minas Gerais. In Juiz de Fora, Ruffato worked as a mechanic and studied journalism at the Federal University of Juiz de Fora (UFJF).

== Main works ==
=== Short stories collections ===
Ruffato's first published work was the 1998 short story collection Histórias de Remorsos e Rancores (Grudges and Regrets). Made up of seven short stories, the book is centered on a set of characters from Zé's Alley in Cataguazes.

In 2000, Ruffato published another collection of six short stories, called Os Sobreviventes (The Survivors). The book features working class characters from Cataguases and deals with the struggles of the working poor. The book received an honourable mention at the Casa de las Américas literary awards in 2001.

=== There were many horses ===
Ruffato's first novel, Eles eram muitos cavalos (There were many horses), was published in 2001. It won the Troféu APCA prize at the Machado de Assis literary awards for best novel of 2001. The novel's title alludes to a poem by the Brazilian poet Cecília Meirelles, and the book is an ode to the city of São Paulo.

=== Temporary Hell ===
In 2005, Ruffato released the novel Mamma, Son Tanto Felice (Mama, I'm So Happy), the first of a series of five books in a series called "Temporary Hell". The series continued with O Mundo Inimigo (Enemy World), published a year later and, later Vista Parcial da Noite (2006), O Livro das Impossibilidades (2008), and Domingos sem Deus (2011). The series was a fictionalized story of the Brazilian working class from the beginning of the twentieth century to the beginning of the twenty-first century. Ruffato revealed that he had had the series in mind before he had published his earlier novels. The final book in the series, Domingos Sem Deus (Sundays without God), was awarded the Casa de las Américas Prize in 2013.

=== Loves Express ===
In 2007, Ruffato was invited to write for the collection Amores Expressos (Loves Expressed), a collection of love stories published by the Brazilian publishing house, The Company of Letters.

=== I was in Lisbon ===
Ruffato was invited to travel to Lisbon, Portugal and subsequently, in 2009, he published the novel Estive em Lisboa e lembrei de você (I was in Lisbon and I remembered you).

=== Writer in residence ===
In 2012, Luiz Ruffato was distinguished as a Brazilian Writer in Residence at the Center for Latin American Studies at UC Berkeley.

== Awards and recognition ==
=== Wins ===
- 2001 APCA Award for Best Novel for They Were Many Horses
- 2001 Machado de Assis Award for Narrative from the National Library Foundation
- 2005 Selected for the Vitae Grant
- 2005 APCA Award for Best Fiction – Mama, I'm So Happy and Enemy World
- 2013 Casa de las Américas Award – Sundays without God

=== Nominations ===
- 2001 Special Mention at the Casa de las Américas Award
- 2006 Finalist for the Portugal Telecom Award
- 2007 Finalist for the Zaffari Bourbon Literature Award
- 2007 Finalist for the Jabuti Award
- 2010 São Paulo Prize for Literature – Shortlisted for Best Book of the Year for I was in Lisbon and I remembered you
- 2012 São Paulo Prize for Literature – Shortlisted for Best Book of the Year for Sundays without God
