= Bel Olid =

Catalan writer and translator

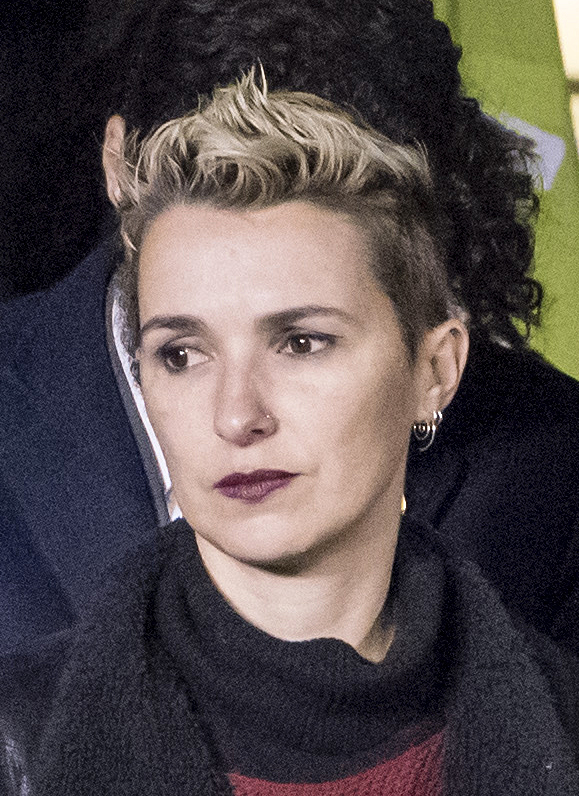
- Born: 4 October 1977 (age 48); Mataró, Spain
- Education: Autonomous University of Barcelona
- Occupations: Writer, translator, teacher
- Awards: Documenta Award (2010)
- Website: belolid.wordpress.com

Bel Olid Báez (born 4 October 1977) is a Catalan writer, translator, and teacher of language, literature, translation, and creative writing. They have received several literary prizes, among them the 2010 Documenta Award. From 2015 to 2022, they were the president of the Associació d'Escriptors en Llengua Catalana. As of 2024, they are an Assistant Instructional Professor in Catalan and Spanish at the University of Chicago.

== Biography ==
Born in Mataró, the child of immigrants from another region of Spain, Bel Olid earned a licentiate in Translation and Interpreting from the Autonomous University of Barcelona (UAB) in 1999, and has since dedicated themself to the translation of books and films. They have worked as a language and literature teacher since 2005. In 2010, they obtained a master's degree in Language and Literature Didactics. They have translated works into Catalan from English, German, French, Italian, and Spanish. They are a member of the Gretel children's and youth literature research group at the UAB.

In 2008, Olid published the storybook Estela, grita muy fuerte to help prevent child abuse, released by the Fineo publishing house for the Rana Association (Help Network for Abused Children) of the Balearic Islands. It received the QWERTY Award for best children's book.

In 2010, they published the essay Les heroïnes contraataquen: models literaris contra l'universal masculí, which received the Rovelló Award.

In 2011, Olid published their first novel, Una terra solitària, in which they portray Andalusian immigration in Catalonia together with cultural, social, and sexual identity in the background, and in which they also introduce the problem of sexual abuse. In 2012 they published La mala reputació (Bad Reputation), awarded with the 2013 Roc Boronat de Narrativa.

In October 2014, together with the writers Josep Maria Espinàs and Albert Sánchez Piñol, they presented the Writers' Manifesto for Independence, signed by more than 300 writers in favor of the independence of Catalonia.

In 2013, Olid was elected president of the European Council of Associations of Literary Translators (CEATL), and in March 2015 they were elected President of the Association of Writers in Catalan, replacing Guillem-Jordi Graells.

They contribute to various Catalan media outlets, including the newspaper Ara and the cultural magazines Tentacles and Núvol.

For the Catalan autonomous elections of 21 December 2017, Bel Olid participated in the lists of the leftist independence coalition Popular Unity Candidacy (CUP) for Barcelona.

== Personal life ==
Olid is a non-binary person and advocates for the use of gender-neutral language in Catalan. Olid uses they/them pronouns in English and elli in Catalan.

== Works ==
=== Books ===
- ¡Estela, grita muy fuerte! (2008), Editorial Fineo, ISBN 9789709957167
- Les Heroïnes contraataquen (2011), ISBN 9788499751122
- Una terra solitària (2011), ISBN 9788497876926
- La mala reputació (2012), ISBN 9788475883335
- Vents més salvatges (2016), Planeta Group, ISBN 9788416367542
- Vides aturades (2016), Ara Llibres, ISBN 9788416915118
- Feminisme de butxaca (2017), ISBN 9788415307594
- Garbancito (2018), Combel Edit, ISBN 9788491012474
- Follem? (2019), Bridge, ISBN 9788416670444
- A contrapelo (2020), Capitán Swing, ISBN 978-8412232486

=== Translations ===
==== German to Catalan ====
- 2005: Miko. He estat jo, mare! (Ich war's, Mama!) by Brigitte Weninger
- 2005: Miko. Visca, és el meu aniversari! by Brigitte Weninger

==== English to Catalan ====
- 2002: Joc de noms (Name Games) by Theresa Breslin
- 2005: Casa meva by Kenny Rettore
- 2005: Al llit! A la banyera! by Kenny Rettore
- 2005: Bona nit, rateta (Goodnight Little Mouse) by Dugald Steer
- 2005: T'estimo, rateta (Little Mouse, I Love You) by Dugald Steer
- 2006: Misión Silverfin (SilverFin) by Charles Higson
- 2006: Nit de fantasmes by Chris Mould
- 2006: Música experimental: de John Cage en endavant (Experimental Music: Cage and Beyond) by Michael Nyman
- 2006: Les estrelles del futbol (David's Dream Team and Zini's All-Stars) by Steve Smallman
- 2007: El carreró de la por by Chris Mould
- 2007: Ni pensar-hi, Drac!: titelles de dit (Don't You Dare, Dragon!) by Annie Kubler
- 2009: Un gorrió a la farina del forner (Sparrow in the Baker's Dust) by Leroy Cardwell
- 2009: Feminisme i història de l'art by Linda Nochlin
- 2009: L'angus, pintallavis i morrejades (Angus, Thongs and Full-Frontal Snogging) by Louise Rennison
- 2012: Coco i Piu (Croc and Bird) by Alexis Deacon
- 2012: L'home de la lluna (The Man in the Moon) by William Joyce
- 2013: Anem a caçar un ós (We're Going on a Bear Hunt) by Michael Rosen
- 2013: "El gegant egoista" ("The Selfish Giant") by Oscar Wilde

==== English to Spanish ====
- 2001: Así sea (So Mote It Be) by Isobel Bird
- 2001: Criminales (Criminals) by Margot Livesey
- 2003: ¿Qué ve, del derecho y del revés? (I Spy) by Walter Wick
- 2005: Gregor La profecía del gris (Gregor and the Prophecy of Bane) by Suzane Collins
- 2005: La lavadora de Lola (Wanda's Washing Machine) by Anna McQuinn
- 2006: Hasta luego, cocodrilo! (See You Later, Alligator!) by Annie Kubler
- 2006: Música experimental: de John Cage en adelante (Experimental Music: Cage and Beyond) by Michael Nyman
- 2006: Los asnos del fútbol (David's Dream Team and Zini's All-Stars) by Steve Smallman
- 2007: Ni se te ocurra, dragón!: marionetas de dedo (Don't You Dare, Dragon!) by Annie Kubler
- 2008: ¿Qué hora se, Lobo? (What's the Time, Mr. Wolf?) by Annie Kubler

==== Spanish to Catalan ====
- 2006: Un dia a la platja (Un día de playa) by Violeta Denou
- 2006: Em disfresso! (¡Me disfrazo!) by Violeta Denou
- 2008: Habitacions tancades (Habitaciones cerradas) by Care Santos
- 2010: Anem a veure el pare (Vamos a ver a papá!) by Lawrence Schimel
- 2011: Un avi, sí! (Un abuelo, sí!) by Nelson Ramos Castro

==== Catalan to Spanish ====
- 2007: Cuentos y leyendas de África (Un meravellós llibre de contes de l'Àfrica per a nens i nenes) by Anna Soler-Pont

==== French to Catalan ====
- 2003: Dalí íntim: dibuixos, apunts i paraules entre contemporanis
- 2009: Coses que passen (Rapport sur moi) by Grégoire Bouillier

==== French to Spanish ====
- 2004: Suspiro (Soupir) by Ananda Devi
- 2010: Larousse del bricolaje by Nuria Lucena Cayuela
- 2013: Balcones y terrazas
- 2013: Rosas

==== Italian to Catalan ====
- 2013: Romanticidi (Romanticidio) by Carolina Cutolo

==== Italian to Spanish ====
- 2013: Romanticidio by Carolina Cutolo

== Literary awards ==
- 2009: QWERTY Award from betevé for Best Children's Book for Estela, grita muy fuerte
- 2010: Documenta Award for Una terra solitària
- 2011: Rovelló Award for Les heroïnes contraataquen: models literaris contra l'universal masculí
- 2012: Roc Boronat Award for Celobert amb papallones (La mala reputació)
