= Manuel Hidalgo Medina =

- Known for: anti-cancer drugs; patient-derived xenograft models
- Scientific career
- Fields: oncology
- Institutions: Beth Israel Deaconess Medical Center

Manuel Hidalgo Medina is an oncologist. He is director of the Leon V. and Marilyn L. Rosenberg Clinical Cancer Center at Beth Israel Deaconess Medical Center in Boston, Massachusetts, in the United States; he also heads its hematology/oncology division. He specializes in pancreatic cancer. His research has included development of anti-cancer drugs such as erlotinib, nab-paclitaxel and temsirolimus, and the development of patient-derived tumor xenograft models.

== Recognition ==
Hidalgo received a research grant from the American Society of Clinical Oncology Conquer Cancer Foundation in 2001.
