= Saneh Sangsuk =

Thai author

Saneh Sangsuk (Thai: เสน่ห์ สังข์สุข, RTGS: Sane Sangsuk; born 1957) is a Thai author. He is known for his works White Shadow (Thai: เงาสีขาว, 2001), The Understory and the short story "Venom" (Thai: อสรพิษ). Saneh uses the pen name Dan-arun Saengthong (Thai: แดนอรัญ แสงทอง) in his published work. In 2008, he received the Ordre des Arts et des Lettres (Order of Arts and Letters) Medal from the French Ministry of Culture for his contributions to literature. Saneh was named a National Artist of Thailand in 2018.

== Career ==
Born in 1957, he majored in English as a college student. In addition to writing, Sangsuk has had several jobs in his career. At one time, he worked for USAID (The United States Agency for National Development). He also worked in advertising and was a translator for a Thai publisher.

== Writing ==
Sangsuk started writing short stories in college. He was inspired by both Thai and international authors including Oscar Wilde, Rabindranath Tagore, Juan Ramón Jiménez, Franz Kafka, and James Joyce. Sangsuk cites Ulysses as one of the main reasons he was inspired to write.

His first published work was "Funeral Song" (Thai: เพลงศพ) which appeared in a local weekly. Since then, he has had many of his works published. He was recognized and awarded a notable short story prize by a local publisher for his short story "Desolate Field" (Thai: ทุ่งร้าง).

Between jobs and during free time, he started writing White Shadow. The work was first published in 1986. The work received little recognition from his Thai audience. It was well received by an international audience. His works have been translated into seven languages including English, German, French, and Spanish. His books are available worldwide, particularly in Europe.

== Awards ==
- "Desolate Field" won notable short story prize from a Thai publisher
- White Shadow (2001) recognized as one of 20 best novels in Thailand by literary critic Marcel Barang and received the 2008 Ordre des Arts et des Lettres Medal from the French Ministry of Culture
- Venom and Other Stories (Thai: อสรพิษและเรื่องอื่น ๆ) won the 2014 S.E.A. Write Award
- Named a National Artist of Thailand (2018)
