= Robert Margerit =

French journalist and writer

Robert Margerit (25 January 1910 in Brive-la-Gaillarde – 27 June 1988 in Isle, Haute-Vienne) was a French journalist and writer.

== Biography ==
He completed high school in Limoges; he was a journalist in Limoges in 1931.

From 1948, he was editor of the Le Populaire du Centre (People's Center), where he remained a columnist after 1952. His writer's library is preserved as the "Robert Margerit" cultural Centre.

== Works ==
=== Novels ===
- Nue et Nu (1936)
- L'Île des perroquets 1942; Phébus, 1984
- Mont-Dragon, 1944, Gallimard, 1952
- Phénix, La Table ronde, 1946
- Le Vin des vendangeurs, Gallimard, 1946
- Par un été torride, Gallimard, 1950
- Le Dieu nu, Phébus, 1951, Prix Renaudot
- La Femme forte, Gallimard, 1953
- Le Château des Bois-Noirs (1954)
- La Malaquaise, Gallimard, 1956
- Les Amants (1957)
- La Terre aux loups, Gallimard, 1958
- La Révolution, 3 volumes: L'Amour et le Temps, Les Autels de la Peur, Un Vent d’acier, Gallimard, 1963, Grand Prix du roman de l'Académie française
- La Révolution, 4th volume: Les Hommes perdus, Gallimard, 1968; Phébus, 1989, ISBN 9782859401313*El Tesoro de Morgan, Translator Manuel Pereira, Edhasa, 1997, ISBN 978-84-350-0656-9
- El reinado del terror, Planeta DeAgostini, 2008, ISBN 978-84-674-6311-8
- ¡A las armas ciudadanos!, Planeta DeAgostini, 2008, ISBN 978-84-674-6015-5

=== Others ===
- Ambigu, nouvelles, Gallimard, 1956
- Singulier, pluriel, journal intime, publié en 2008, l'Association des amis de de Robert Margerit, Plaisir de lire

=== Screenplays ===
- Mont-Dragon by Jean Valère, with Jacques Brel, 1970
- Les Bois noirs by Jacques Deray, with Béatrice Dalle, 1989
