= Maria Barbal =

Spanish writer (born 1949)

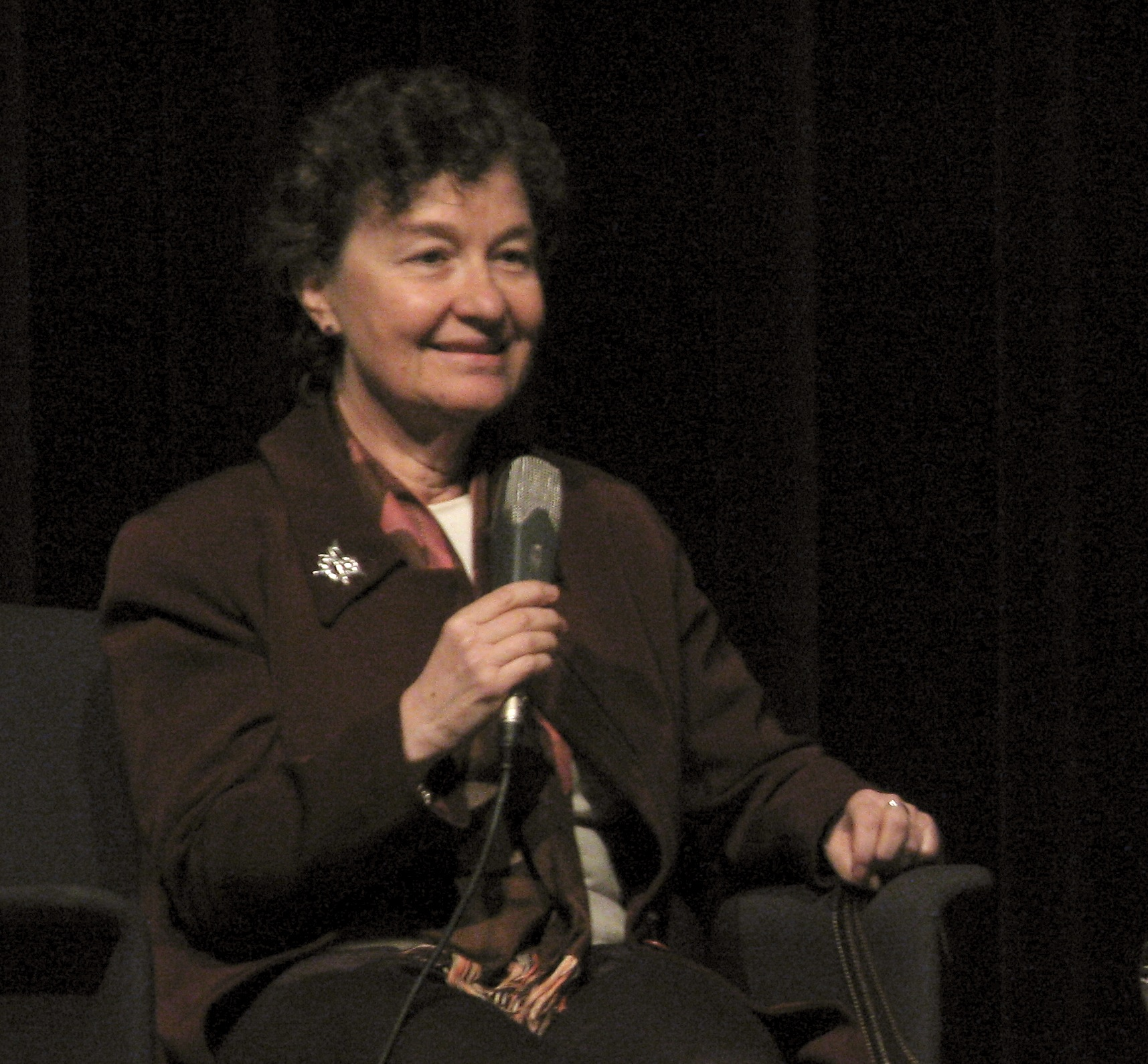
Maria Barbal (2008)

Maria Barbal i Farré (Tremp, Pallars Jussà, 17 September 1949) is a Spanish writer. She spent her childhood in rural Catalonia, which profoundly influenced her literary work. In 1964, at the age of 14, she moved to Barcelona to pursue her education, eventually earning a degree in Hispanic Studies from the University of Barcelona in 1971.

== Career ==
Even though she has lived in Barcelona from the 1960s onward, the literary world of her early work as an author concentrates on the Pallars county of her childhood and adolescence, a rural surrounding observed by a critical eye. Her first novel, Pedra de tartera [‘Stone from a boulder’], fully set in that space, was praised by the public and critics alike. Her first novel has been translated into English as Stone in a Landslide. Later works take up more urban environments. She also is the author of short stories, juvenile novels, and a theatre play.

Barbal's work has been translated into Asturian, French, German, Portuguese, Spanish, and Dutch. Throughout her career, Barbal has received numerous accolades, including the Creu de Sant Jordi in 2001, one of Catalonia's highest honors. In 2021, she was awarded the Premi d'Honor de les Lletres Catalanes in recognition of her significant contributions to Catalan literature.

== Literary work ==
=== Novels ===
- 1985 Pedra de tartera
- 1990 Mel i metzines
- 1992 Càmfora
- 1996 Escrivia cartes al cel
- 1999 Carrer Bolívia
- 2002 Cicle de Pallars
- 2003 Bella edat
- 2005 País íntim

=== Prose ===
- 2001 Camins de quietud: Un recorergut literari per pobles abandonats del Pirineu

=== Short narrative ===
- 1986 La mort de Teresa
- 1994 Ulleres de sol
- 1998 Bari

=== Child and juvenile narrative ===
- 1991 Pampallugues
- 1992 Des de la gàbia
- 1995 Espaguetti Miu

=== Theatre ===
- 2000 L'helicòpter
