= Kaspar Capparoni =

Italian actor (born 1964)

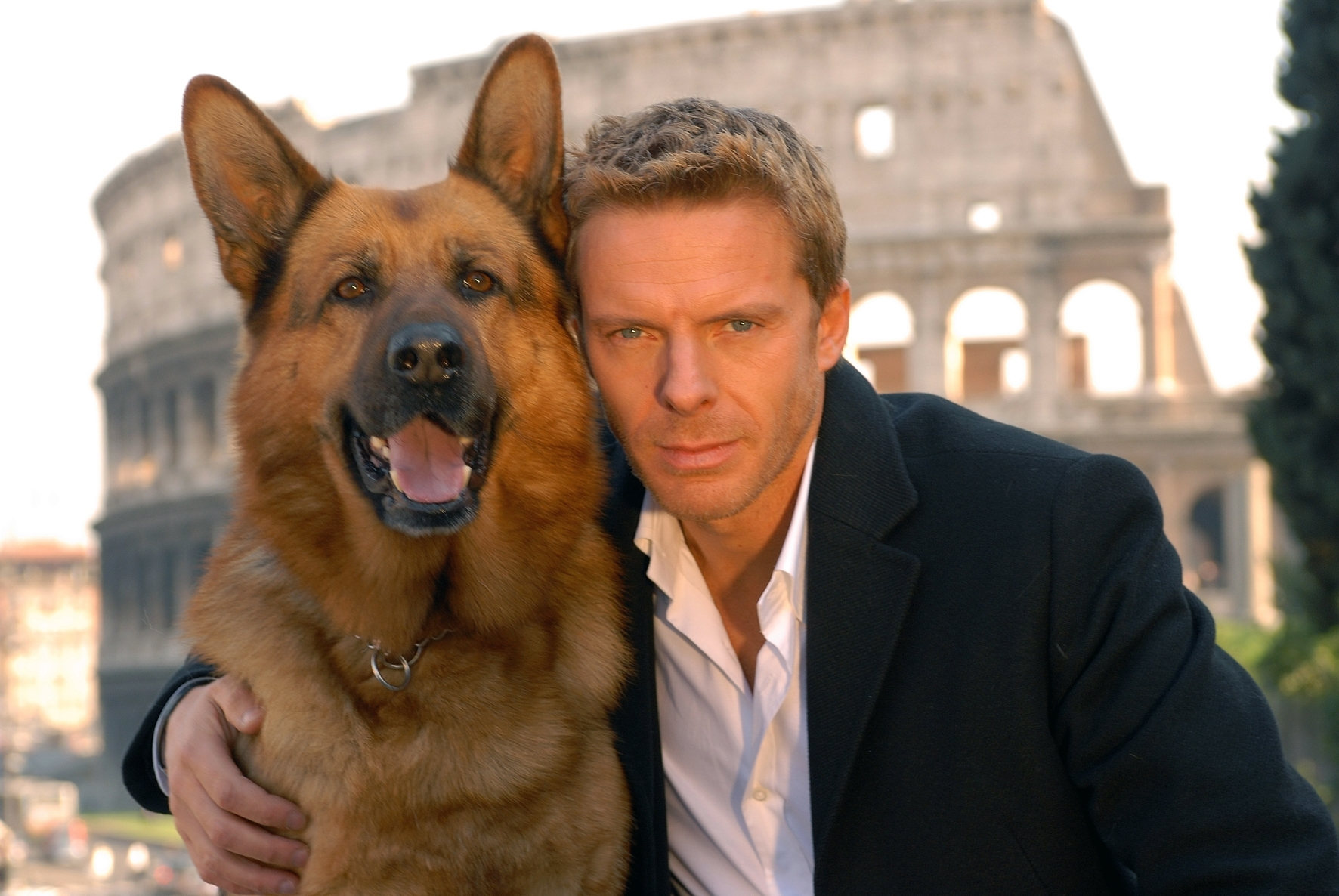
- Kaspar Capparoni with Rex in Rome
- Born: Gaspare Capparoni; 1 August 1964 (age 61); Rome, Italy
- Occupations: actor, character actor
- Spouse: Veronica Maccarone (fiancé)

Gaspare "Kaspar" Capparoni (born 1 August 1964) is an Italian actor.

== Biography ==
A native of Rome, Capparoni became a theater actor when he was 18, directed by Giuseppe Patroni Griffi. In 1984 he also appeared in the film Phenomena, directed by Dario Argento.

He has worked in various fiction television settings, which included: the soap operas Ricominciamo (2000, TV miniseries), Piccolo mondo antico (TV miniseries), Incantesimo 4 (2001), Elisa di Rivombrosa (2003), La caccia (2005, a TV miniseries directed by Massimo Spano, as the antagonist for Alessio Boni), and for Capri (2006, TV series) alongside actress Bianca Guaccero.

In 2007, he performed as a protagonist in the miniseries Donna Detective directed by Cinzia TH Torrini. In 2008, he was also in Inspector Rex, under the direction of Marco Serafini, and in the series Capri 2 directed by Andrea Barzini and Giorgio Molteni.

== Filmography ==
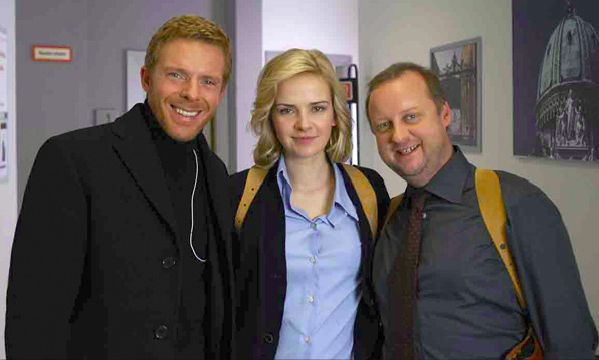
Kaspar Capparoni with Denise Zich and Martin Weinek.

=== Cinema ===
- Phenomena (1984) – Karl, Sophie's Boyfriend
- Colpi di luce (1985)
- Bellifreschi (1987)
- Gialloparma (1999) – Giulio
- Encantado (2002) – Thomas Grasso
- Il ritorno del Monnezza (2005) – Avv. Lamantia
- Il sole nero (2007) – Salvo
- Two families (2007)

=== Television ===
- Addio e ritorno (1995, TV Movie) – Francesco
- Tequila & Bonetti (2000, Episode: "Cuore rapito") – Andrea Naselli
- La casa delle beffe (2000, TV Movie)
- Ricominciare (2000–2001) – Alex (2000)
- Piccolo mondo antico (2001, TV Movie) – Rampelli
- Incantesimo 4 (2001) – Dr. Max Rudolph
- Elisa di Rivombrosa (2003–2004) – Giulio Drago
- La caccia (2005, TV Movie) – Mario Saracco
- Provaci ancora prof! (2005, Episode: "La mia compagna di banco") – Edoardo Sovena
- Capri (2006–2008) – Massimo Galiano
- Donna Detective (2007–2010) – Michele Mattei
- Rex (2008–2011) – Lorenzo Fabbri
- Il giudice Mastrangelo 3 (2009)
