= Magenta (disambiguation) =

Magenta is a color.

Magenta may also refer to:

== Places ==
- Magenta, Lombardy, Italy
- Magenta, Marne, France
- Magenta, New South Wales, Australia

== Media and entertainment ==
- Magenta (DC Comics), a DC Comics character, enemy of the Flash
- Magenta (EP), a 2020 EP by South Korean singer/songwriter Kang Daniel
- Magenta (film), a 1996 film by Gregory Haynes
- "Magenta" (The Flash), an episode of The Flash
- Magenta (Norwegian band), an alternative rock group
- Magenta (Welsh band), a progressive rock group
- Magenta, a character in The Rocky Horror Show
- Magenta, a character from Blue's Clues and Blue's Clues & You!
- Magenta Telekom, an Austrian subsidiary of T-Mobile

== Other uses ==
- Peristrophe bivalvis, also known as the magenta plant
- MAGENTA, a block cipher
- Magenta (Paris RER) rail station
- Magenta Air, a Peruvian airline
- A.S. Magenta, a New Caledonian football team
- Battle of Magenta, an 1859 during the Second Italian War of Independence

== People ==
- Magenta Devine (1957–2019), British TV presenter and journalist
- Giovanni Magenta (1565–1635), Italian architect
- Guy Magenta (1927–1967), French composer
- Muriel Magenta, visual artist

== See also ==
- Duke of Magenta (disambiguation)
- Magenta Line (disambiguation)
- Shades of magenta, a list of shades
- Magento, an open-source e-commerce platform
