= Alexander Brandtner =

- Inspector Rex character
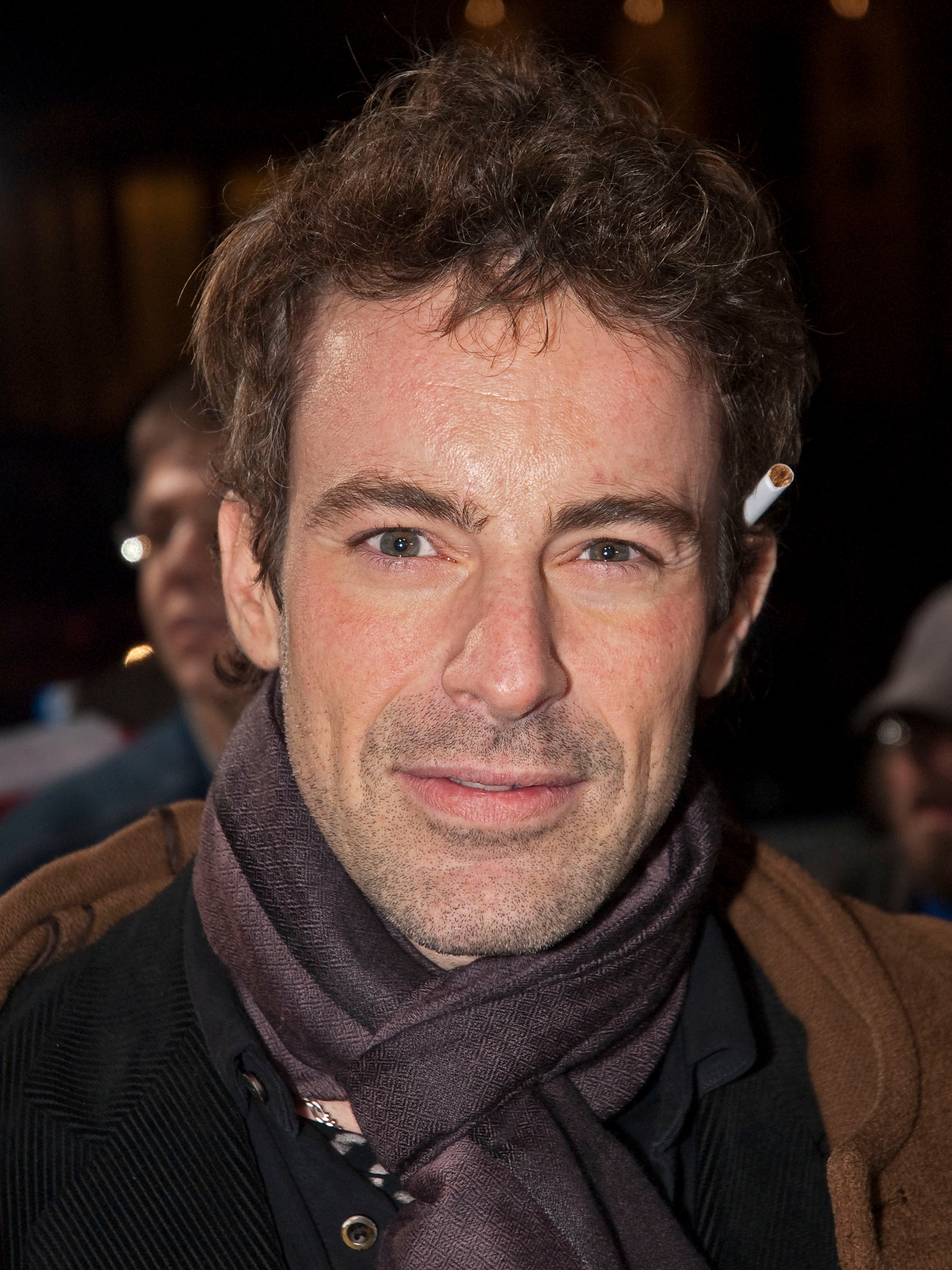
- Created by: Peter Hajek; Peter Moser
- Portrayed by: Gedeon Burkhard

In-universe information
- Nickname: Alex
- Title: Inspector
- Spouse: Rex
- Significant others: List of Inspector Rex characters

Alexander Brandtner is a fictional character from the police drama television series Inspector Rex, which airs on ORF and Sat.1 in Austria. The character was created by series' producer Peter Hajek and Peter Moser, and is portrayed by Actor Gedeon Burkhard. First Gedeon Burkhard was a guest star in Season 1 Episode 9 "Amok" as Stefan Lanz, but then he became the main star.

Alex Brandtner replaces Moser as team leader. Following Moser's death, Rex has become depressed and refuses to eat, wanting to stay near Moser's house all the time. However, Brandtner succeeds in helping Rex out of his depression. Brandtner had lost his former dog, Arko, in a bomb explosion and does not want to work with dogs again, until he meets Rex. The explosion has also robbed him of his hearing in his right ear, a fact he confides only to Rex. Brandtner moves into the house that Moser and Rex used to share, apparently because Rex does not want to leave.

Compared to Moser, Brandtner is shown to be more athletic and performs various physical stunts throughout the series, such as diving over car bonnets, engaging in fast-paced chases on foot and dives. His living room is filled with boxing and fitness gear and he is portrayed as very attractive to women.

He had once gone undercover in a prison and also as a drunken homeless man. On his first appearance in the show, he dives into the Danube Canal to retrieve a vital piece of evidence, and later in his debut episode he parachutes from a light aircraft, along with Rex, in order to apprehend a suspect. He also seems to have an uncanny instinct for sensing if a suspect is guilty or innocent, even without evidence.

During the time Burkhard was on the show, the international ratings for the series increased.

Burkhard's looks were also exploited by the producers of the show. In one episode, a bank burglar that Brandtner had once caught re-offended again after being released, and managed to take him hostage during the climactic confrontation. He then forced Brandtner to strip to prove that he was unarmed, before parading him through the street in only his underwear. When taunted about how he felt, Brandtner said "sexy".
