= Inspector Rex =

Austrian-Italian television series

- Also known as: Kommissar Rex; Il commissario Rex
- Genre: Police procedural
- Created by: Peter Hajek; Peter Moser
- Starring: See Characters
- Opening theme: A Good Friend (season 1–10); My Friend Rex (season 11–13); My Name is Rex (season 14–18)
- Ending theme: My Name is Rex (season 11–18)
- Countries of origin: Austria (1994–2004); Italy (2008–2015); Austria, Germany (2026–)
- Original languages: German (1994–2004); Italian (2008–2015)
- No. of episodes: 215 (list of episodes)

Production
- Producers: Peter Hajek; Peter Moser
- Running time: 45 minutes

Original release
- Network: ORF 1
- Release: November 10, 1994 – October 19, 2004
- Network: Rai 1
- Release: January 29, 2008 – June 19, 2015
- Network: ORF 1
- Release: April 13, 2026

Related
- Stockinger; Muhtar's Return; Inspetor Max; Komisarz Alex; Inspektorius Mažylis; Rex; Hudson & Rex

Inspector Rex (German: Kommissar Rex; Italian: Il commissario Rex) is an Austrian-Italian police procedural television series created by Peter Hajek and Peter Moser. Originally an Austrian series aired from 1994 to 2004 on ORF 1, in 2008 it was revived as an Austro-Italian production on Rai 1 and, from the next year, was made fully in Italy, with occasional episodes set in Austria. Rai 1 eventually cancelled the Austro-Italian production in June 2015, after eight Italian seasons.

The series follows the German Shepherd police dog Rex, his partners and the rest of the team at the Vienna Kriminalpolizei homicide unit, as they work together to solve crimes. From 2008, episodes are set in Rome.

A spin-off series, Stockinger, focuses on Ernst Stockinger, one of the original members of the homicide division, was televised in 1996. International remakes include Polish Komisarz Alex (English title: Inspector Alex), set in Łódź (2012–present); Latvian Inspektors Grauds (2002); Russian Muhtar's return (2004–2019, broadcast on Russia-1 and NTV); Portuguese Inspetor Max (2004–present); Lithuanian Inspektorius Mažylis (2014); Slovak Rex set in Bratislava (2017) and Canadian Hudson & Rex (2019–present).

In October 2024, it was announced that Inspector Rex will return to television in 2026. "Rex: Vienna Calling" premiered April 13, 2026.

== Synopsis ==
The original series is set in Vienna and focuses on the three-man staff of an office of the Kriminalpolizei – the Austrian Criminal Police – specifically a Mordkommission (homicide unit). In addition to the three policemen, the office is staffed by a German Shepherd called Rex, the main star of the show, who functions variously as a cadaver dog, a sniffer dog (for both contraband and narcotics) and as another pair of eyes and ears for his team.

The original team at the office consisted of Richard Moser, Ernst Stockinger and Peter Höllerer. This team was also assisted by forensic expert Dr Leo Graf and retired policeman Max Koch. The show had many changes in characters, including Christian Böck replacing Stockinger, Alexander Brandtner replacing Moser and former statistics officer Fritz Kunz replacing Höllerer. The final Austrian incarnation of the series featured a male-female duo of the clumsy Marc Hoffmann and a female officer Nikki Herzog working alongside Kunz. Dr. Graf is the only character to remain for the entire Austrian production of the series.

In season eleven, the action moves to Rome, with Inspector Lorenzo Fabbri taking charge of the dog. Episodes were produced in both Italian and German. At the end of the season, Rex is apparently mortally wounded when he jumps on Fabbri's head to protect him from a bullet, but is shown in close-up still slightly breathing just before credits roll. The beginning of season 12 shows that Rex survived the bullet, when Fabbri takes Rex to the animal hospital.

== Production ==
For the first ten seasons the show was scripted entirely in German, where most characters spoke with Austrian dialects. It was shot on location in Vienna and its surroundings, though the usage of areas in production was often geographically incorrect. While subtitles were used for most international markets, the series was dubbed in some countries, including France, Greece, Italy, Slovakia, the Czech Republic and Spain.

Following declining ratings during the eighth and ninth seasons, the series was cancelled mid-production in 2004, leaving the tenth and then final season with only four episodes and no finale that concluded the story. As the series was still highly popular abroad, particularly in Italy and Austria, the show remained in syndication for many years.

In 2007, following negotiations, Italian broadcaster RAI secured the rights to revive the series, with production moving to Rome. For the first season of the new series, numbered as season eleven, it was produced in both Austria and Italy, with production moving to Italy full-time for the twelfth season. A total of eighteen seasons were produced, the last airing in 2015, barring repeats. While occasional episodes were set in Austria, the series was scripted and filmed primarily in Italian from 2008 to the concluding 2015 season.

=== Australian season numbering ===
For Australian markets, season numbering was altered for airing on SBS, and this numbering was also used on the DVD sets, leaving some viewers confused as to how the European episode lists correspond with the Australian ones. For the DVD sets, seasons 1 to 8 have been re-arranged to seven longer seasons (the chronological episode order remaining unchanged), with the ninth and tenth season being labeled as "season eight". They have since followed the official lists, with season eleven labeled as season nine, season twelve as season ten and so on.

== Characters ==
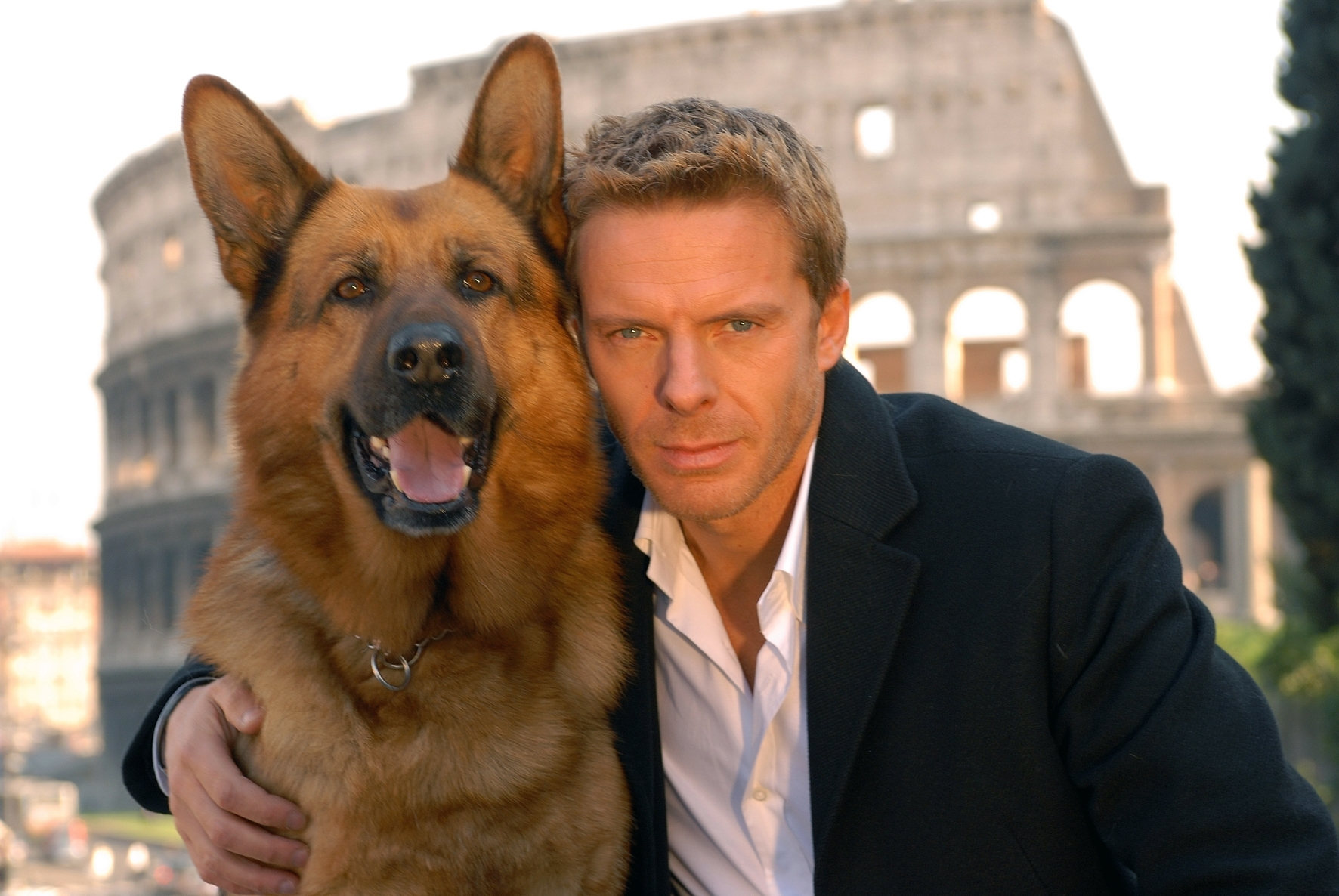
Kaspar Capparoni with Rex in Rome

=== Rex ===
A trained police dog, Rex (revealed in the Pilot to be registered as "Reginald von Ravenhorst") is the star of the show. Establishing shots frequently show him demonstrating a new trick — unlatching doors, pushing trolleys, pointing to drugs or corpses — which then turn out to be useful in the course of the episode. He is often used to stalk suspects, often with a GPS-type object attached to him so that the officers can keep track.

Rex was stolen by criminals as a pup but managed to escape and befriend a boy, where he helped to solve his first case with the boy.

Initially, Rex and Moser share an apartment at Marokkanergasse 18, Wien-Landstraße; however the pair go house-hunting at the start of season 2. They quickly find a house (Waldstraße 8, Purkersdorf) owned by a man who does not want dogs there. However, Rex is able to alert him to a gas leak, and in gratitude, he allows Moser and Rex to stay.

Rex is frequently called upon to resolve difficult situations, including helping a young girl in shock, preventing a woman from committing suicide and helping to get Moser's mobile phone when a crime has been committed. One famous episode features Moser using Rex to resolve a hostage situation by telling him to creep up behind the criminal and "frighten him" (following Rex's earlier success at frightening Stockinger by jumping on him from behind).

There is also a considerable element of humour in Rex's activities. Rex has an uncanny penchant for ham rolls or "Wurstsemmln" in the local dialect. He is introduced to them by Moser, who tells him, "I practically live on these." Rex constantly annoys Stockinger by pulling on his coat and stealing his ham rolls. Later, Höllerer keeps a running score of Böck's success against Rex – not a flattering result for the officer. While not chasing criminals, he often plays pranks on the officers or fails to obey orders to help with the housework. Rex is very fond of horses and once fastened a rope to Alex's car so he could take the horse home. Another time, Rex attacked a man who was beating a horse and, later in the same episode, he ran into a burning barn to rescue a horse.

With Moser, Rex reacts particularly badly to words like "frau" (woman) and, later, "tierarzt" (vet), as he disapproves of his master's attention to women. During a scene in which Koch claims that Moser "doesn't understand women at all now," Moser tells Koch, "Don't say that word. Every time you say 'woman', he [Rex] runs off with my laundry. " Koch asks him what Rex does with it, to which Moser replies, "He washes it." Rex was not jealous of Alex and stole a rose for Alex to give to a pretty blonde co-worker.

Once, when Moser is working undercover and needs to ensure Rex won't greet him, he tells Stockinger, "You only need to say 'vet' to him and he'll stop whatever he's doing", a statement which results in a memorable scene involving Stockinger walking after Rex at a crime scene calling out "Vet! Vet!"

Rex was played by four dogs over the years in Europe including Santo vom Haus Zieglmayer, also known as 'Beejay', and his double, Rhett Butler who took the lead role in 2000. For the 2008 revival, Rex was played by a dog named Henry. From 2012 to 2013, Rex was played by Nicky. With Diesel vom Burgimwald, all of the "German Shepherd Dogs" that play Rex in the Canadian series, Hudson & Rex are related to Santo and his great-grandsire, VA5 Elch vom Trienzbachtal.

=== Rex's partners ===
Richard Moser (Tobias Moretti, 1994–1998)

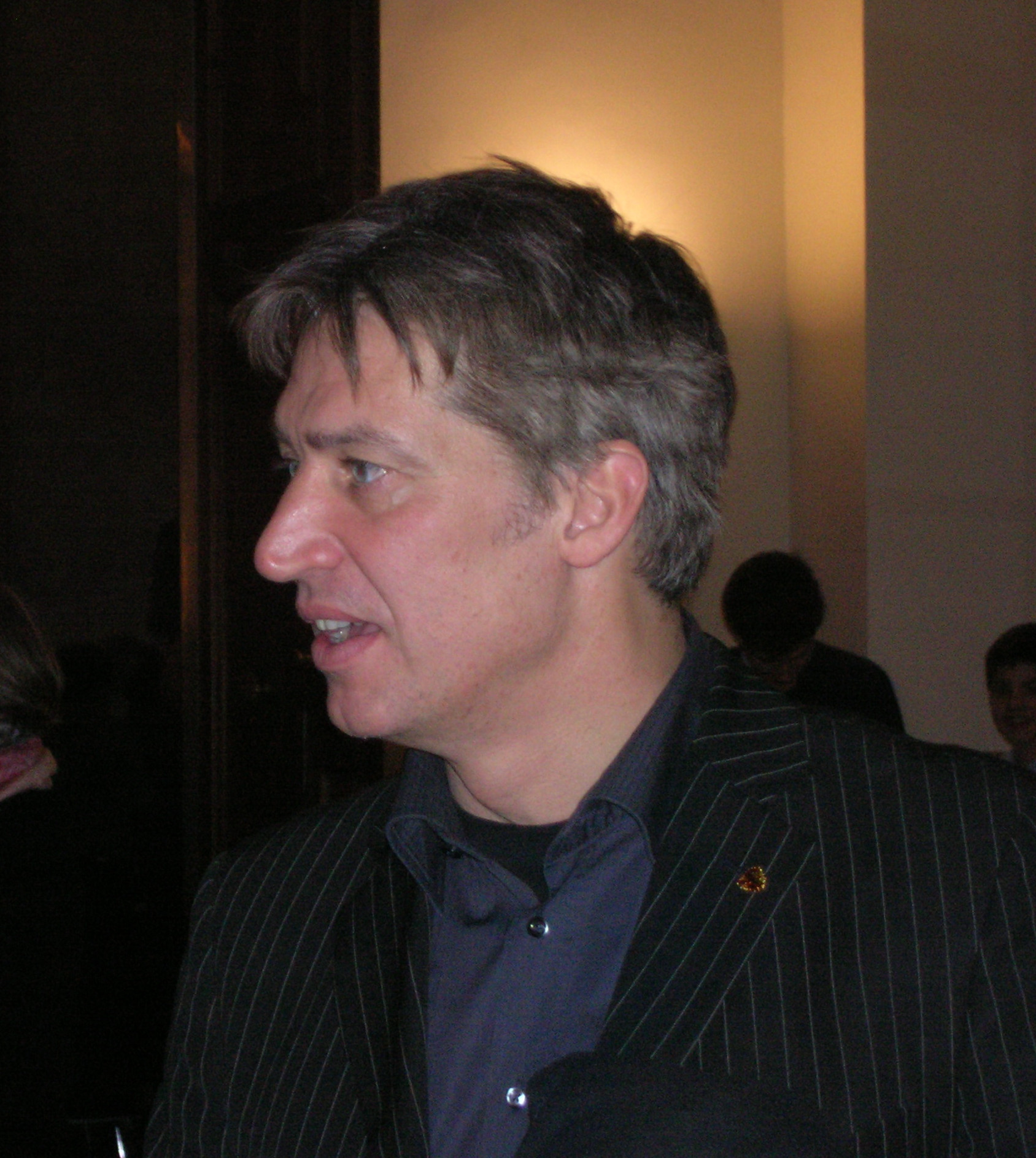
Tobias Moretti, January 2007

The first "team leader", Richard "Richie" Moser is a hard-bitten cop who, as the first season begins, is going through a bitter divorce from his wife Gina, who takes all their furniture. Moser is also attempting to quit smoking to improve his blood circulation. An ex-truck driver, Moser credits Max Koch with keeping him from a life of crime, at one point telling Koch that "I'd be on the wrong side of the law too, just like him", referring to a young pickpocket he has just chased through central Vienna.

Moser befriended Rex, whose former police trainer, Michael, was shot and killed by an escaping suspect. To save the dog from being put down, Moser "adopted" him without ever completing any of the official paperwork. He famously declares at one point, "My taxes pay for this dog, so why can't I give him a better home?" Moser, in contrast to his successors, is shown to be quite athletic, often performing acrobatic stunts while chasing suspects. Moretti's looks were also exploited by the producers of the show. He made several nude appearances, including an episode where Moser and a female colleague frolic naked in the woods to attract a serial killer targeting young couples.

As Moser's personal life improves, his sense of humour returns. This is noticeable in the general lightening in the tone of the show from the initial episodes ("Diagnosis Murder" being a prime example) to ones with more lighthearted banter among the officers. Being a bachelor, Moser flirts with many of the attractive women featured in the storylines. Moser begins a relationship with Sonja, his local vet, which Rex thoroughly disapproves of and constantly tries to sabotage. In time, Rex accepts Sonja and even pretends to have an injured paw when he wants her to stay with him. Sonja eventually leaves Moser and Rex when she is offered a job in America.

In the final scenes of the season 4 episode "Moser's Death", Moser is killed in the line of duty by an escaped 'borderline psychopath', played by famous German actor Ulrich Tukur (Das Leben der Anderen) while Moser is rescuing his lover, Patricia Neuhold (a psychologist who has been helping with the case). The escapee commits suicide just after he kills Moser, and there is a heartbreaking scene at the hospital after the doctor tells Moser's friends that he died. Rex takes a squeaky toy that Moser bought at the beginning of the episode to Moser's body and squeaks it until he accepts his master is gone, then he lays his head on Moser's chest and the scene fades to white.

Alexander Brandtner (Gedeon Burkhard, 1998–2001)

Alex Brandtner replaces Moser as team leader. Following Moser's death, Rex has become depressed and refuses to eat, wanting to stay near Moser's house all the time. However, Brandtner succeeds in helping Rex out of his depression. Brandtner had lost his former dog, Arko, in an explosion and does not want to work with dogs again until he meets Rex. The explosion has also robbed him of his hearing in his right ear, a fact he confides only to Rex. Brandtner moves into the house that Moser and Rex used to share, apparently because Rex does not want to leave.

Brandtner is portrayed as very attractive to women and performs various physical stunts throughout the series, such as diving over car bonnets, engaging in fast-paced chases on foot, and dives. On his first appearance in the show, he dives into the Danube to retrieve a vital piece of evidence, and later in his debut episode he parachutes from a light aircraft, along with Rex, in order to apprehend a suspect. His living room is filled with boxing and fitness gear.

He had once gone undercover in a prison and also as a drunken homeless man. He also seems to have an uncanny instinct for sensing if a suspect is guilty or innocent, even without evidence.

During the time Burkhard was on the show, the international ratings for the series increased. Unlike Moretti, Burkhard's looks were not exploited by the producers of the show, and he did not make nude appearances. The most skin that Burkhard showed was in an episode where a bank burglar forced Brandtner to strip to prove that he was unarmed before parading him through the street in only his underwear.

Marc Hoffmann (Alexander Pschill, 2002–2004)

Replacing Brandtner as team leader, Hoffmann is a very eager detective. Hoffmann is portrayed as being very witty, outsmarting murderers. He shares a close relationship with Nikki Herzog, although they sometimes have disagreements.

Apparently Hoffmann had studied forensic science under Graf, and the two men still seem to share a somewhat master-student relationship, with Hoffmann often deferring to Graf's judgment (where Brandtner and Moser had previously not always done so).

Lorenzo Fabbri (Kaspar Capparoni, 2008–2012)

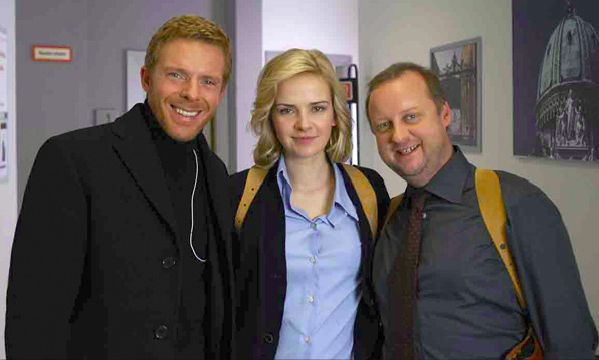
Kaspar Capparoni with Denise Zich and Martin Weinek

In season 11, Italian homicide detective, Chief Inspector Lorenzo Fabbri. arrives in Vienna to work on a case, and takes Rex, who is officially 'retired', back to Rome. Rex seems to understand the Italian language quite easily. In the second episode of season 14 (entitled "Amidst the Wolves"), Fabbri dies in the explosion of a car during a trap prepared by a Mafia boss.

Davide Rivera (Ettore Bassi, 2012–2013)

Davide Rivera replaces Fabbri as team leader in season 14. Rivera becomes friends with Rex after the loss of Inspector Lorenzo Fabbri. He follows his grandfather's advice, and eventually, Rex stops avoiding him.

Rivera appears for the last time on the last episode of season 15, titled "Legami di sangue." It is unknown why he does not appear in season 16.

Marco Terzani (Francesco Arca, 2013–2015)

Chief Inspector (later Deputy Commissioner) Marco Terzani replaces Rivera as team leader in season 16. Working under Gori, and later under Director Fiori, he forges a very strong bond with Rex. He doesn't hesitate to bend rules to solve a tough case.

=== Other detectives ===
Ernst Stockinger (Karl Markovics, 1994–1996)

The "straight man" to Rex — and, increasingly, Moser — Ernst Stockinger ("Stocki" for short) is a character who becomes much more likeable as his part in the series develops. Stockinger is thin and always has a very serious demeanour. In later episodes, this is revealed as a cover for his schemes to outsmart Rex, who loves to tease him. Although Stockinger pretends not to like dogs, he risks his career to help Moser save Rex when the dog is kidnapped to prevent Moser from testifying against an assassin. For all Stockinger's constant irritation with Rex, he genuinely has come to care for this particular dog. This is very obvious in the last two episodes Stocki appears in, when he is upset that Rex jumps from one roof to another to capture a killer. Stocki is also openly affectionate to Rex once his transfer is approved, and he realizes how much he is going to miss the team. He tells Richard and Höllerer they are his only friends and includes Rex as his friend as well.

Stockinger is married, and his wife, it seems, is not greatly pleased with her husband's choice of career at times, and Moser often reminds him of this. Stocki's knowledge of women does not save him and Rex from being thrown out by Stocki's wife when he watches Rex and the dog howls for Moser.

Another of Stockinger's idiosyncrasies is his constant references to surgery, which has been performed on him - most likely for stomach ulcers. He seems to delight in telling stories about this surgery at the most inappropriate moments, such as when the others are about to eat.

Eventually, Stockinger is transferred to Salzburg and leaves the series. In this final episode, Rex saves Stockinger by leaping across a classroom just as a disgruntled divorced man was about to stab Stockinger in the throat during an attempted kidnapping attempt on his child. Moser, in a farewell speech, jokingly tells Stocki, "You have been a bad cop, a bad man, and not at all a good friend." Stockinger later features in a spin-off two season television series, Stockinger, featuring him at his new police department. He is replaced by Christian Böck.

Peter Höllerer (Wolf Bachofner, 1994–1999) Source:

The obese Peter Höllerer is a constant source of comic relief in the series. Generally found ensconced behind his desk working the phones, his face visibly falls whenever Moser and Stockinger (or, later, Brandtner and Böck) require him to do fieldwork. That said, he is capable of surprising speed when running and can also demonstrate driving skills on a par with other officers. In one episode, Höllerer is taken hostage by a man with a bomb who forces him to drive away from a police blockade. Höllerer turns the tables by driving at high speed into an empty parking lot and diving out of the car. In another episode, Höllerer disarmed a bomb just before it would have exploded.

Höllerer tends to take a co-ordinating role when an operation is being planned, rather than actually going undercover or making the arrest himself. In these situations, he reveals himself to have a very clear head and to be capable of coping with even the most unusual situations that his partners get involved in.

Höllerer has a soft spot for Rex as the series progresses, after first voicing concern that Moser did not adopt him through the proper channels. This is shown by his keeping score between Böck and Rex in the early episodes featuring the former. Höllerer takes inordinate delight in seeing the dog outsmarting the man.

Höllerer's departure from the series is brought about by his retirement to care for his ailing mother, a woman about whom he often speaks. He is replaced by Fritz Kunz.

Of all the recurring characters in the series, Höllerer's accent is the thickest. Viewers familiar with standard German will often have difficulty understanding his Viennese dialect.

Christian Böck (Heinz Weixelbraun, 1996–2001)

Böck is first introduced as a somewhat suspicious-looking character, a member of a borderline-illegal car club who is not even trusted by his club mates. During the course of his investigation into this club, Moser begins to suspect Böck, but he turns out to be an undercover policeman making similar investigations.
The two eventually combine to solve the relevant case, and Moser convinces Böck to transfer to his team. Böck's undercover skills are largely ignored after the transfer, but his personable manner proves an advantage when it comes to interrogations (particularly contrasting with the somewhat dour Moser). By the time of Brandtner's arrival, Böck's youth and athleticism have resulted in his frequently being involved in chasing criminals on foot. The dynamic between Böck and Kunz forms an almost constant source of comic relief. Most notable in this is their dialogue when trying to establish the angle from which a witness would have seen a certain event - each man speaks at cross-purposes to the other, and both end up totally confused. Böck and Rex share a rivalry, with Böck trying to outsmart Rex, but Rex wins nearly all the time. Böck is also one of the few who question Rex's abilities as an elite police dog, but Moser keeps telling him that he has always been this way.

Fritz Kunz (Martin Weinek, 1999–2004, 2008)

Replacing Höllerer after the latter's retirement to care for his mother, Kunz has been drawn from the statistics section of the force. Initially, he is very much out of place in the slightly freer atmosphere of Brandtner's office. A running gag in his early appearances deals with his obsessive-compulsiveness and fussy attention to the placement of his desk stationery (e.g., pencils arranged from tallest to shortest and paper clips aligned) only to have Rex or one of the others move everything around.

Kunz's background in statistics is also often the source of amusement, as he is seemingly able to deliver, from memory, obscure statistical information about the activities of criminals. He tends to be used to man the phones during investigations rather than on active duty. However, he is also occasionally required to go undercover (once as a kitchen hand, another time as a stable hand and another as an entertainer in a street market), much to his chagrin. Kunz is much tougher than he looks. He once smashed a door in with an axe just in time to save Alex's life after a murder suspect left Alex face down and unconscious in a filling bathtub.

Nikki Herzog (Elke Winkens)

The only female officer in the history of the show, Herzog (played by Elke Winkens) is paired with Hoffmann (Kunz is almost entirely desk-bound in this incarnation of the series), and sexual tension constantly results. The pair spend the night together before starting their new jobs, without realising that they are both police officers.

In contrast to Hoffmann, Herzog tends to be more level-headed and capable of performing physical acts. Her physical appearance also serves the team well in relating to suspects, as she is frequently underestimated and sometimes taunted by brash male criminals.

Giandomenico Morini (Fabio Ferri)

Morini is a colleague of Lorenzo Fabbri, and they work on every crime together. Rex does not obey Morini at all. However, in one episode, he takes care of Rex because Fabbri has broken his ankle. At the beginning of the 14th season, he is transferred to Milan and leaves the series.

Alberto Monterosso (Domenico Fortunato)

Alberto Monterosso replaces Morini. He becomes intensly loyal to his boss.

=== Other characters ===
Dr Leo Graf (Gerhard Zemann)

Dr Leo Graf is the forensic pathologist consulted by the detectives. On occasion, he is found at the crime scene itself. However, he is normally to be found in his pathology laboratory and occasionally comes into the police office. Gerhard Zemann is the only actor to appear as the same character throughout the long-running series.

Dr Graf is a sometimes prickly person, but underneath his exterior, he has a very dry wit - frequently regaling the detectives against their will with the gruesome details of a murder.

Naturally, he is quite comfortable in his lab, surrounded by dead bodies, even if others are not. Many of the earlier episodes highlight the contrasting reactions of the policemen (especially Moser and Stockinger) and Graf to the death all around them.

At times, however, Dr Graf clearly resents the pressure put on him by the policemen. One memorable telephone exchange involves Moser agreeing to pay Dr Graf a number of Cuban cigars for working on the weekend. Another time, Graf's car is towed while he is investigating a murder scene. The resulting invective he uses towards the authorities responsible is caustic.

Where Graf is very amiable towards Moser's team, this relationship progressively changes as Brandtner arrives. Early episodes featuring Brandtner show Alex and Leo using formal language - generally involving the German "Sie" form of address (the polite form). Eventually, this exterior is broken down, and the new team is invited to call him Leo - a sign of considerable familiarity in German or Austrian society. Accordingly, Brandtner's greeting to Graf alters from the formal "Guten Morgen" to the more familiar "Servus."

With Hoffmann and Herzog, however, the relationship with Graf is more of a teacher-student one. It emerges early that Hoffmann had been taught forensic techniques by Graf, and it is clear that some of the awe felt by the considerably younger policeman for his mentor is still present. Graf also assumes a much more advisory role with this team, appearing only once during each investigation instead of being constantly on call.

By the time Rex moves to Rome with Lorenzo Fabbri of the Italian police, Dr Graf still serves as Vienna's main forensic officer as seen in a Rex special as Rex and Fabbri return to Vienna to investigate a case there.

Max Koch (Fritz Muliar)

Familiarly known to all as Max, Koch is a retired policeman who saved Moser from a life of crime and became something of a mentor to him. Many early episodes feature Moser asking Koch for advice - often in a café or a pool hall. It is, in fact, advice from Koch which is responsible for solving many of the more baffling cases, as his insights into human psychology - particularly female psychology (something he often claims Moser has had no knowledge of since his divorce) - prove correct. Occasionally, when a case hinges on the behaviour of a female witness or suspect, Koch good-humouredly teases Moser about women and gently tells him, "Richard, since your divorce, you've lost your touch with women".

As the series progresses, Koch's role alters to that of being a useful spy for Moser in certain situations where his team is too well-known. It is Koch's visit to a restaurant that provides the breakthrough in one case. In another, he stumbles upon the solution to a particularly brutal homicide while sitting in a park with Rex. Koch is increasingly reluctant to help Moser with his work, although he is always told that this will be the last time. As Stockinger points out, it always is the last time... until the next request. Moser also tries to appeal to Koch's sense of adventure which, as Max famously explains, is satisfied by eating goulash and not knowing if he will suffer from "Rinderwahnsinn" (mad cow disease).

Following Stockinger's transfer to Salzburg, Koch assists the team to reorganise the office. His snide remarks about Stockinger's files result in Höllerer telling him to read through them all (to which Koch responds that he's doing more work since he retired than he did when he worked). He also spreads out his pipe collection on Stocki's old desk and declares that he will "open a pipe shop" while the team attempts to find a replacement for Stocki. Max is no longer seen or spoken of after Moser's death.

Katia Martelli (Pilar Abella)

Katia Martelli is the forensics officer in Rome. She is seen as a romantic interest for Fabbri, but Rex is opposed to this. She is always looking for an opportunity to ensnare him. At one point, when Fabbri is injured and is at home researching a murder related to role playing games on his computer, he asks for a gaming police officer to be sent to his house to brief him about computer game culture. Martelli takes this opportunity to enter his house and seduce him, and creates an RPG profile for him so he can befriend the suspects online—the figure she chooses for him is a model of Fabbri wearing only a towel.

Morini constantly goads Martelli and Fabbri into coupling. After one case is solved, Fabbri takes her home to wine and dine her, much to Rex's chagrin. At the start of the next episode, they drunkenly awake in Fabbri's bed.

Filippo Gori (Augusto Zucchi)

Filippo Gori is Fabbri's boss who initially disapproves of Rex. But after Rex passes all official tests and wins a medal, Gori accepts that Rex can solve crimes and lets him stay. Rex and Fabbri brought down a prostitution and sex slave racket run by some illegal Chinese immigrants—Fabbri leaked the story to a journalist friend so that Rex was photographed on the front page of a newspaper. In the episode "A Man Alone," Gori's partner is murdered. Although all limited evidence points to Gori, Fabbri proves that he is not the culprit. Gori is initially mostly office-based, but later takes charge of several operations.

Filippo (Morini's fish)

Filippo is Morini's fish. Morini got a fish because he was jealous of Lorenzo. Morini does not realize that he has named his fish after his boss, so when Gori comes in, he says his fish is called Filiberto.

== Episodes ==
Series	Episodes	Originally released		
Series	Episodes	First released	Last released	Network
1	14	10 November 1994	9 February 1995	ORF
2	15	19 October 1995	22 February 1996	ORF
3	12	24 October 1996	9 January 1997	ORF
4	13	8 January 1998	26 March 1998	ORF
5	13	28 January 1999	22 April 1999	ORF
6	12	16 February 2000	10 May 2000	ORF
7	10	28 March 2001	30 May 2001	ORF
8	13	9 October 2002	15 January 2003	ORF
9	13	27 November 2003	18 March 2004	ORF
10	4	28 September 2004	19 October 2004	ORF
11	8	29 January 2008	19 February 2008	RAI
12	11	17 March 2009	13 April 2009	RAI
13	12	14 June 2011	19 July 2011	RAI
14	12	3 November 2011	11 November 2011	RAI
15	12	26 November 2012	11 February 2013	RAI
16	11	20 December 2013	20 January 2014	RAI
17	12	31 March 2014	5 May 2014	RAI
18	12	27 February 2015	19 June 2015	RAI

== Legacy ==
=== Notable fans ===
German priest and choirmaster Georg Ratzinger, when asked if he ever watched television at the Vatican with his brother Pope Benedict XVI, stated that the brothers would watch Inspector Rex together, and were friends with the owner of the titular German Shepherd. "We always used to watch [Inspector Rex], because we like dogs, too. We are well acquainted with Herr Helmut Brossmann, the owner of the German Shepherd Dog (GSD) Rex, who plays the title role. He lives in the vicinity of Regensburg."

== Broadcasters ==
Kommissar Rex has been shown in the following countries:

Country	Title	Translation	Channel	Type
Argentina	Comisario Rex	Inspector Rex	The Film Zone; Magazine TV	Latin American; Spanish dubbing
Australia	Inspector Rex	Inspector Rex	SBS network	German, English subtitles
Austria	Kommissar Rex	Inspector Rex	ORF	Original German language
Belgium	Rex, chien flic	Rex, police-dog	VTM; RTL-TVI	German + Dutch subtitles, French dubbing
Brazil	Comissário Rex	Inspector Rex	Multishow; Band	Brazilian Portuguese dubbing + subtitles
Bulgaria	Комисар Рекс	Inspector Rex	BNT 1 Diema; Nova TV	Bulgarian dubbing
Canada (Quebec)	Rex	Rex	Séries+	Quebec French dubbing
Chile	Comisario Rex	Inspector Rex	Chilevisión; The Film Zone; TVN	Latin American; Spanish dubbing
Colombia	Comisario Rex	Inspector Rex	Caracol; Citytv Bogotá; The Film Zone	Latin American; Spanish dubbing
Croatia	Inspektor Rex	Inspector Rex	HRT 2, Nova TV, Doma TV	German, Italian; Croatian subtitles
Cyprus	Υπαστυνόμος Ρεξ	Police lieutenant Rex	Sigma TV	Greek dubbing
Czech Republic	Komisař Rex (seasons 1–10); Návrat Komisaře; Rexe (seasons 11-...)	Inspector Rex; Return of Inspector Rex	Prima Network; TV Nova	Czech dubbing
Denmark	Kommissær Rex	Inspector Rex	TV 2 Charlie	German, Danish subtitles
Dominican Republic	Comisario Rex	Inspector Rex	The Film Zone	Latin American; Spanish dubbing
Estonia	Komissar Rex	Inspector Rex	Kanal 2 TV1 (Estonia); DUO3; Kanal 12	German, Estonian subtitles
Finland	Poliisikoira Rex	Police-dog Rex	Nelonen; MTV3; Sub	German, Finnish subtitles
France	Rex, chien flic	Rex, police-dog	France 2 France 3	French dubbing
Germany	Kommissar Rex	Inspector Rex	Sat.1; ZDF	Original German language
Greece	Υπαστυνόμος Ρεξ	Police lieutenant Rex	Alpha; Alter; Skai TV	Greek dubbing
Hungary	Rex felügyelő	Inspector Rex	TV2; M1; AXN	Hungarian dubbing
Iceland	Lögregluhundurinn Rex	Rex the police-dog	Sjónvarpið	German, Icelandic subtitles
Iran	Komiser Rex	Inspector Rex	PMC; Islamic Republic of Iran Broadcasting; Rubix	Persian dubbing
Israel	המפקח רקס	Commissar Rex	Israel Plus	Russian voice-over
Italy	Il commissario Rex (seasons 1–10); Rex (seasons 11-...)	Inspector Rex; Rex	Rai 1 Rai 2	Italian dubbing
Japan	REX～ウィーン警察シ ェパード犬刑事～	Rex - Vienna Police; Shepherd Dog Inspector	Mystery Channel	German, Japanese subtitles
Latvia	Komisārs Reksis	Inspector Rex	LTV1; LNT; Fox Crime	Latvian voice-over
Lithuania	Komisaras Reksas	Inspector Rex	BTV (Lithuanian TV channel); LTV/LRT televizija TV3 (Lithuanian TV channel)	Lithuanian voice-over
Mexico	Comisario Rex	Inspector Rex	The Film Zone; TVC (no longer as of 2009)	Latin American; Spanish dubbing
Morocco	Rex, chien flic	Rex, police-dog		French dubbing
Netherlands	Commissaris Rex	Inspector Rex	RTL 4 Tien; RTL Crime; ONS	German, Dutch subtitles
New Zealand	Inspector Rex	Inspector Rex	TVNZ 1	German, English subtitles
North Macedonia	Комесарот Рекс	Inspector Rex	A1	German, Macedonian subtitles
Norway	Rex	Rex	TV2	German, Norwegian subtitles
Paraguay	Comisario Rex	Inspector Rex	The Film Zone; TV Cinema (now Unicanal); Paravisión	Latin American; Spanish dubbing
Peru	Comisario Rex	Inspector Rex	The Film Zone; Latina Televisión; Red Global (now NEXT TV)	Latin American; Spanish dubbing
Poland	Komisarz Rex; Komisarz Alex (Polish edition)	Inspector Rex; Inspector Alex	TV 4 TVP1; AXN Crime; TV6	Polish voice-over Original Polish language
Portugal	Rex, o cão polícia	Rex, Police-dog	SIC	German; Portuguese subtitles European Portuguese dubbing (since 2013)
Romania	Comisarul Rex	Commissioner Rex	Prima TV; TVR1; TVR2	German, Romanian subtitles
Russia	Комиссар Рекс	Komissar Rex	Russia-1; STS; M1 (First Moscow); Domashny; Viasat	Russian voice-over
Serbia	Inspektor Reks	Inspector Rex	AXN	German, Serbian subtitles
Sri Lanka	Rex	Rex	ITN	Sinhala subtitles
Slovakia	Komisár Rex (seasons 1–10); Komisár Rex: Opäť v akcii (seasons 11-...)	Inspector Rex Inspector Rex: Again in action	Markíza; TV JOJ	Slovak dubbing
Slovenia	Komisar Rex	Inspector Rex	Radiotelevizija Slovenija; Kanal A POP TV	German, Slovene subtitles
Spain	Rex: Un policía diferente	Rex, a different police officer	Antena 3 Telecinco; FORTA	Spanish dubbing Galician dubbing Catalan dubbing
Sweden	Kommissarie Rex	Inspector Rex	TV4; Kanal 9	German, Swedish subtitles
Switzerland	Kommissar Rex; Rex, chien flic Il commissario Rex	Inspector Rex; Rex, police-dog Inspector Rex	DRS; TSR; RTSI	Original German language French dubbing Italian dubbing
Turkey	Komiser Reks	Inspector Rex	Kanal 1 (Turkey); TRT 1	Turkish dubbing
Ukraine	Комісар Рекс	Inspector Rex	Novyi Kanal; STB; K1	Russian voice-over Ukrainian dubbing Ukrainian dubbing
United States	Comisario Rex	Inspector Rex	V-me	Latin American; Spanish dubbing
Uruguay	Comisario Rex	Inspector Rex	Teledoce	Latin American; Spanish dubbing
Venezuela	Comisario Rex	Inspector Rex	The Film Zone; Televen	Latin American; Spanish dubbing
Vietnam	Rex, chú chó thám tử	Rex, the detective dog	VTV	Vietnamese voice-over

== Home releases ==
In Italy, the first 6 seasons were released on DVD, with only the Italian dub. The first two seasons were also released in Germany, again only with German audio.

In Australia, Region 4 English-subtitled DVDs of Inspector Rex are currently available for the first sixteen seasons (labeled as fourteen in Australia; see Australian numbering). The Italian seasons of the show were released under the special title "Rex in Rome".

On 10 October 2007, a special DVD, "Rex By Request" was released featuring the five favourite Kommissar Rex episodes as voted by fans. Also included is an interview with producer/writer Peter Hajek and an hour-long dog-training segment featuring Rex and his trainer Teresa Ann Miller.

Australian Releases:

- Inspector Rex - Series 1 (4 Disc Box Set) - 20 June 2005
- Inspector Rex - Series 2 (4 Disc Box Set) - 22 September 2005
- Inspector Rex - Series 3 (4 Disc Box Set) - 24 January 2006
- Inspector Rex - Series 4 (5 Disc Box Set) - 31 March 2006
- Inspector Rex - Series 5 (4 Disc Box Set) - 16 August 2006
- Inspector Rex - Series 6 (4 Disc Box Set) - 10 November 2006
- Inspector Rex - Series 7 (4 Disc Box Set) - 7 February 2007
- Inspector Rex - Series 8 (4 Disc Box Set) - 7 June 2007
- Inspector Rex - Series 9 (2 Disc Set) - 17 November 2008
- Inspector Rex - Series 10 (3 Disc Set) - 27 November 2009
- Inspector Rex - Series 1 To 5 (21 Disc Box Set) - 1 December 2010
- Inspector Rex - Series 6 To 10 (17 Disc Box Set) - 5 October 2011
- Inspector Rex - Series 11 (3 Disc Set) - 2 November 2011
- Inspector Rex - Series 12 (3 Disc Set) - 20 November 2013
- lnspector Rex - Series 13 (3 Disc Set) - 5 November 2014
- lnspector Rex - Series 14 (3 Disc Set) - 4 November 2015
- Inspector Rex - Series 11 to 14 (12 Disc Set) - 9 September 2017
- Rex Special Unit - Season 1 (3 Disc Set) - 9 September 2017
- Rex Special Unit - Season 2 (3 Disc Set) - 3 October 2018
