= Giftgas =

Giftgas may refer to:

- Giftgas (film) starring Gerhard Dammann
- Giftgas (record) on Throbbing Gristle discography
- Giftgas! the second full-length studio album by Canadian Holocaust denier national socialist black metal one-man band Blood Libel
- Giftgas, episode in List of Inspector Rex episodes#Season 5
- A German word meaning "poison gas"
  - Zyklon B gas used by Nazi Germany for extermination of Jews, featuring the warning "GIFTGAS!" prominently on its label
- A frequent mis-hearing for Giffgaff (a British mobile phone service), often in the recorded message "This is Giffgaff voicemail"
