= Muhtar's Return =

- Also known as: Mukhtar. The New Trace
- Возвращение Мухтара
- Genre: crime film, adventure film
- Created by: NTV
- Developed by: Kit Media
- Written by: Inna Zaporozhchenko; Vyacheslav Schmidt
- Directed by: Alexander Polynnikov (season 1); Vladimir Zlatoustovsky (season 2 — present)
- Starring: see below
- Theme music composer: Yevgeny Muravyov
- Composers: Kirill Volkov; Alexander Kosenkov
- Country of origin: Russia
- Original language: Russian
- No. of seasons: 12
- No. of episodes: 990

Production
- Producers: Pavel Korchagin; Felix Kleiman
- Production locations: Moscow (season 1); Kyiv (seasons 2 — 9); Minsk (season 10 - present)
- Camera setup: Yury Britsov; Sergei Koshel; Vladimir Pastukh; Alexander Klimenko
- Running time: 45 minutes
- Production company: Studia 2V

Original release
- Network: RTR (2004); NTV (2004-present)
- Release: January 12, 2004 – present

Related
- Kommissar Rex

Mukhtar. The New Trace (Russian: Мухтар. Новый след, in 2004–2015 is Muhtar's Return, Russian: Возвращение Мухтара) is a Russian detective, crime, serial film, a film about the adventures of investigators, police officers, police and search dog. Production Company "Kit Media" on request of "Studio 2V". Series premiere was held on 12 January 2004 from the RTR, and August 31, 2004, the project was on the NTV.

== Plot ==
The heroes of serial movie work in the police department (and since season 8 in the police) and investigate various crimes ranging from petty theft to serious disappearances, kidnappings and killings. The uniqueness of the team is that, together with operatives serves Mukhtar is a brave and loyal dog who helps to reveal the tangled affairs thanks to his unique scent and ingenuity.

== Cast ==
- Alexander Nosik as Artyom Kolosov (1-2 seasons)
- Alla Kovnir as Elena Brusnikina (1-4 seasons)
- Alexander Volkov as Maxim Zharov (3-4 seasons)
- Viktor Nizovoy as Anatoly Schepkin (1-4 seasons)
- Natalia Yunnikova as Vasilisa Mikhailova (4-8 seasons, 9 season 26 episode)
- Pavel Vishnyakov as Maxim Zharov Andreevich (5-6, 9–10 seasons)
- Alexey Shutov as Maxim Zharov (7-8 seasons)
- Vladimir Feklenko as Maxim Zharov (11-12 seasons)
- Alexey Moiseev as Alexey Samoilov (3-11 seasons)
- Alexander Voevodin as Nikolay Nikolayevich Khrulev (1-12 seasons)
- Svetlana Brjukhanova as Ekaterina Kalitina (9-12 seasons)
- Nadezhda Antsipovich as Nadezhda Kostrova (10-12 seasons)
- Artyom Osipov as Ivan Davidov (12 season)
- Sergey Gromov as Roshchin Evgeny Aleksandrovich (12 season)
- Daniil Doroshenko as Ershov Ivan (9-10 seasons)
- Valery Astakhov as Dyatlo Viktor Petrovich (3-10 seasons)

== List of episodes ==
The series is conditionally divided into seasons 10.

Season	Number of episodes	The screens	TV Channel
1	40	12.01.2004 — 23.03.2004 31.08.2004 — 04.10.2004	RTR NTV
2	50	21.02.2006 — 31.03.2006	NTV
3	100	28.11.2006 — 09.11.2007	NTV
4	80	13.11.2007 — 26.05.2008	NTV
5	96	09.11.2009 — 28.01.2010	NTV
6	96	29.01.2010 — 07.12.2010	NTV
7	96	10.05.2011 — 05.09.2012	NTV
8	96	06.09.2012 — 30.04.2013	NTV
9	96	03.02.2014 — 20.04.2015	NTV
10	48	21.04.2015 — 15.10.2015	NTV
11 (Mukhtar. The New Trace)	96	20.03.2017 — 14.03.2018	NTV
12 (Mukhtar. The New Trace)	96	14.05.2018	NTV

== The series soundtracks ==
Come Here, Mukhtar! (Russian: Ко мне, Мухтар!) that sounds in the series, was originally performed by Alexander Kosenkov, and starting from the season 2, this song was sung by Vladimir Zlatoustovsky, director of the film. Lyrics were written by songwriter Yevgeny Muravyov. Music by Alexander Kosenkov.

== Production ==
The season 1 was filmed in Moscow. Since the season 2 episodes filmed in Kyiv involving local actors in secondary roles. Most episodes filmed in Kyiv right bank Nyvky region. In particular, the facade of the police building located there filmed as the entrance of the Russian police, where the main characters serves. In 2014—2015 began filming the TV series in Minsk.

On 28 May 2016 filming of the TV series continued, but under a new name, Mukhtar. The New Trace.

== Awards ==
Creative team of the show, including actors, writers and directors, twice (2007 and 2009) awarded diplomas and medals of the Ministry of Internal Affairs "for creating a professional image of criminal investigator and propaganda service dog Russia".

In 2009 the Mukhtar's Return 2 episode was awarded with special prize at the International Festival of Detective Films DetectiveFEST. In 2015 It took part in "TEFI-2015" and received a main prize in the nomination "Telenovela", surpassing "The Last Yanychar" (Russia-1) and «From the Heavens to the Earth» (TV center).

== See also ==
- Kommissar Rex
