= Heinz Weixelbraun =

Austrian actor (born 1963)

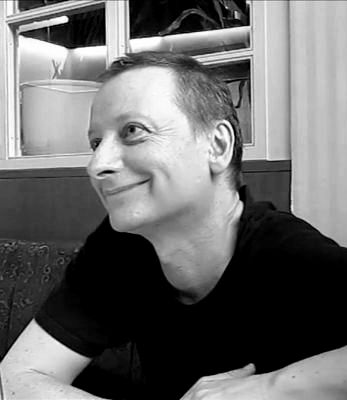
- Born: 19 May 1963 (age 63); Spittal an der Drau, Austria
- Occupation: Actor
- Years active: 1987–present

Heinz Weixelbraun (born 19 May 1963) is an Austrian actor. He is best known for his performance as Christian Böck in Inspector Rex.
