= Curt Bräuer =

German career diplomat

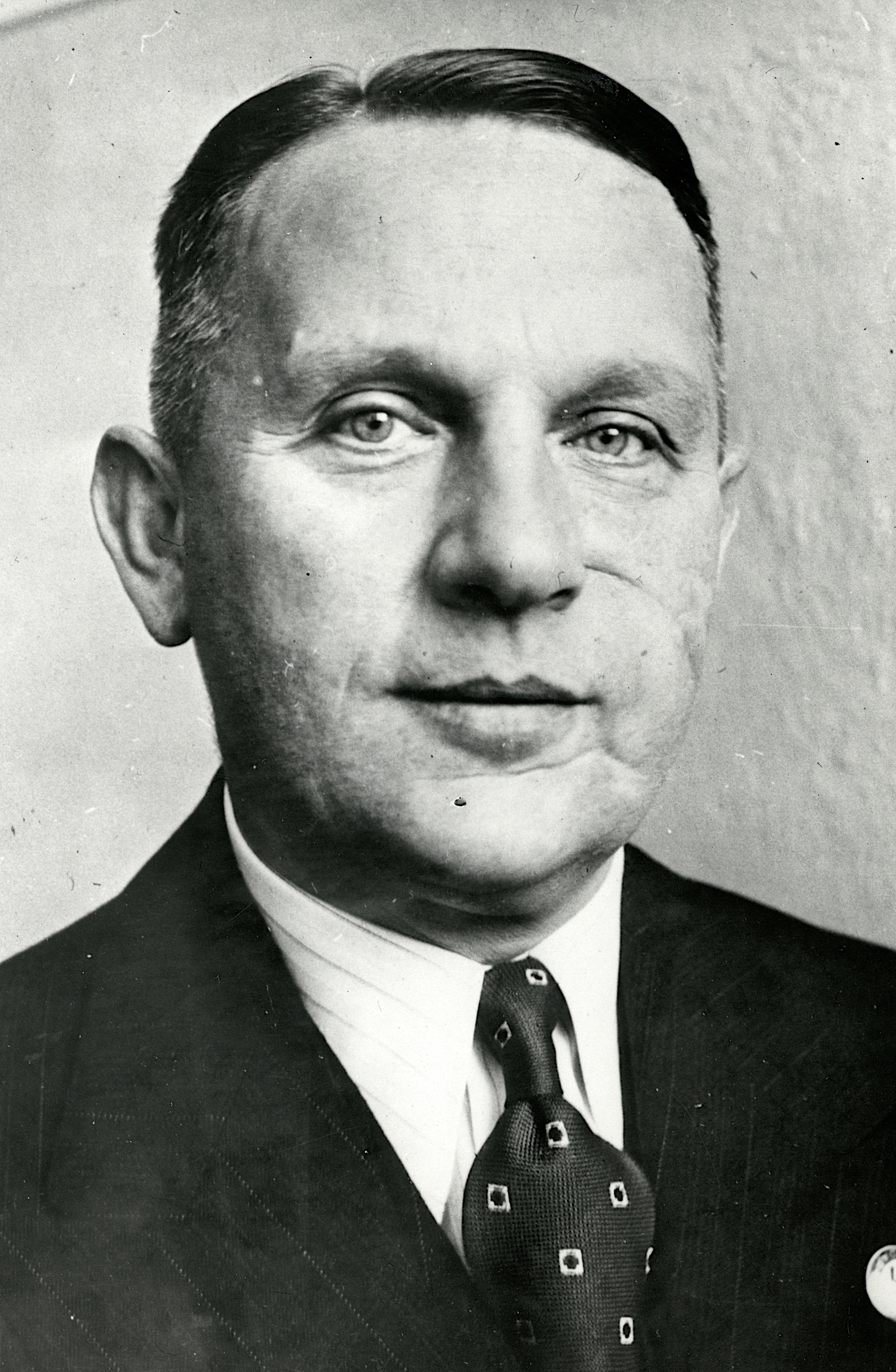
- Born: 24 February 1889; Breslau, German Empire (Now Wrocław, Poland)
- Died: 8 September 1969 (aged 80); Wiesbaden, West Germany

Curt Bräuer (24 February 1889 – 8 September 1969) was a German career diplomat.

Born in Breslau, in what is modern-day Poland, Bräuer entered service in the German foreign ministry in 1920. From 1928 to 1930, he was a member of the German Democratic Party. On 1 August 1935, he joined the Nazi Party. At the outbreak of World War II in September 1939, Bräuer was posted at the German embassy in Paris. Later that year, Bräuer was named as envoy to Norway, and served in Oslo beginning on 14 November 1939. Bräuer was Germany's representative in Norway at the time of the invasion of Norway in April 1940.

Until the invasion, the official German foreign policy was to respect Norwegian neutrality, a line which Bräuer is said to have agreed with and worked toward. However, on the evening of 8 April 1940, the envoy received orders from Berlin — he was to be Hitler's representative and deliver a German ultimatum for the occupation of Norway to the Norwegian government the next morning.

The Norwegian government refused the German demands and left the capital as it became clear that Norway was becoming overrun with German troops. In the following days, Bräuer tried to convince the Norwegian government and King Haakon VII to capitulate and to name Vidkun Quisling as prime minister. The Norwegian government refused these demands and vowed to resist the German invasion as long as possible.

On 16 April, Hitler recalled Bräuer from Oslo, deciding that the Norwegian resistance to the invasion dictated that the country be administered by a more authoritarian personality. Hitler named Josef Terboven— an enthusiastic Nazi — to assume the position of Reichskommissar for Norway. Terboven wielded near-dictatorial powers in Norway until war's end.

After his recall from Norway, Bräuer left the diplomatic service and was sent to the front as a lieutenant colonel in the Wehrmacht. He spent eight years as a prisoner-of-war in the Soviet Union.

== In popular culture ==
Bräuer was portrayed by Austrian actor Karl Markovics in the 2016 Norwegian war film The King's Choice, a role that earned him an Amanda Award 2017 for Best Actor in a Supporting Role .

== See also ==
- The King's Choice, a 2016 Norwegian biographical war film that depicts Curt's negotiations with the King and the Norwegian government in detail.
