= Gerhard Zemann =

Austrian actor

Gerhard Zemann (March 21, 1940, Vienna — April 14, 2010, Salzburg) was an Austrian actor. He appeared in many television series and films through his career, becoming best known for playing forensic pathologist Leo Graf on the series Inspector Rex from 1994 until 2004. He died of a heart attack in 2010, aged 70.
