= Rex (Slovak TV series) =

- Genre: Police drama, police procedural, dramedy
- Starring: Juraj Bača; Lukáš Latinák; Gregor Hološka; Vladimír Jedľovský
- Country of origin: Slovakia
- No. of seasons: 1
- No. of episodes: 13

Production
- Producer: Rasťo Šesták
- Running time: 45 min.

Original release
- Network: TV Markíza
- Release: 7 September 2017 – present

Rex is a Slovak police procedural drama, based on the Austrian drama Inspector Rex. The television series commenced in 2017 on Slovak television channel Markíza. The show follows the German Shepherd police dog Rex, his partners, and the rest of the team in Bratislava as they work together to solve crimes. Rex is played by three different dogs, originating from Poland. In November 2017, it was announced that Rex was being renewed for a second series.
