= Karl Markovics =

Austrian actor and film director

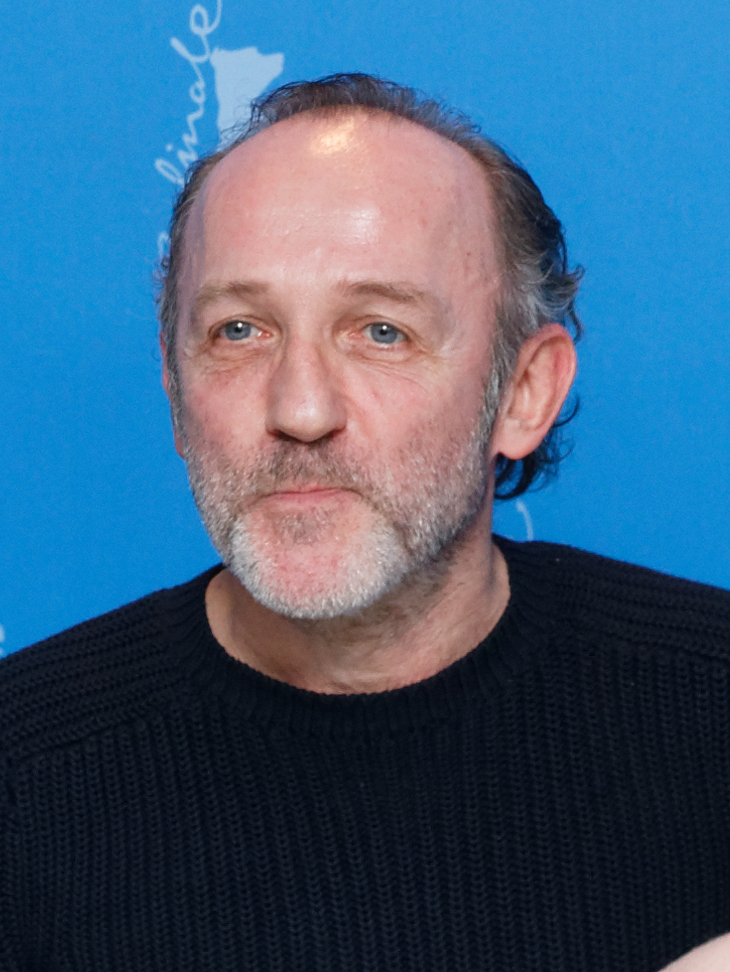
- Markovics in 2017
- Born: 29 August 1963 (age 63); Vienna, Austria
- Occupations: actor; film director
- Known for: The Counterfeiters
- Spouse: Stephanie Taussig
- Children: 2

Karl Markovics (born 29 August 1963) is an Austrian actor and film director. Born in Vienna, Austria, he starred in Stefan Ruzowitzky's 2007 film The Counterfeiters, which was awarded the first ever Academy Award for Best Foreign Language Film for Austria.

== Biography ==
Markovics' mother worked as a clerk and his father was a bus driver. Markovics did not want to go into a professional career but wanted to become a stage actor, which his parents supported. However, he failed to pass the entry exam for the Max-Reinhardt-Seminar. He did not let this deter him from his dream and began performing at the Serapions Theater in Vienna. In 1987, he started working with the Wiener Ensemble. In 1991, he got his first part in the movie, "Hund und Katz" and in 1993, he played the part of the innkeeper in Paul Harather's tragic-comedy road movie "Indien".

Markovics became known to a wider audience when he played Ernst Stockinger, appearing in the Austrian crime show "Inspector Rex", and then later in the spin-off series "Stockinger". Roles followed with parts in "Hinterholz 8", "Late Show" and – as the main character acting alongside Julia Stemberger - in Geboren in Absurdistan, as well as in "Komm, süßer Tod. Markovics performed in many TV and theater productions, including those at Viennese theaters Theater in der Josefstadt and Wiener Volkstheater, where in 2005 he directed his first play production, The Bald Singer, by Eugène Ionesco.

Markovics starred as Salomon Sorowitsch in Stefan Ruzowitzky's 2007 film The Counterfeiters, which was awarded the Academy Award for Best Foreign Language Film for that year. Prior to that, his most notable appearances have been in the highly acclaimed Austrian (Viennese) black comedy Komm, süßer Tod (2001), his role as far-right terrorist Franz Fuchs in the 2007 TV film Franz Fuchs - Ein Patriot, and in the police drama television series Inspector Rex. His character from Inspector Rex had his own spin-off series, Stockinger. He also played the role of Ferdinand aus der Fünten in the 2012 Dutch film Süskind, and a small role (Wolf) in the acclaimed 2014 comedy The Grand Budapest Hotel. He also plays a supporting role in the German television series Babylon Berlin.

Markovics remains a frequent stage actor, and in April 2010 played the non-singing role of Samiel in Counterfeiters-director Ruzowitzky's first opera production, Der Freischütz at Vienna's Theater an der Wien. He directed and wrote Atmen in 2011.

== Personal life ==
Markovics is married to actress Stephanie Taussig. They have two children, Louis and Leonie, and reside in Vienna, Austria.

== Selected filmography ==
Year	Title	Notes	Awards
1994-1996	Inspector Rex	TV series	
1996-1997	Stockinger	TV series spin-off Inspector Rex	
2001	All the Queen's Men		
2007	The Counterfeiters	Academy Award for Best Foreign Language Film winner film	Valladolid International Film Festival Award for Best Actor; Nominated:German Film Award for Best Actor
2011	Unknown		
2011	Breathing	Writer and director	Heart of Sarajevo Award for Best Film at the Sarajevo Film Festival; Best Director Debut at The International Film Festival of the Art of Cinematography Camerimage; Nominated:Golden Camera at the Cannes Film Festival; Nominated:European Film Award for European Discovery of the Year
2014	The Grand Budapest Hotel		
2015	Me and Kaminski		
2015	Superwelt	Writer and director	
2016	The King's Choice	as Curt Bräuer	Amanda Award 2017 for Best Actor in a Supporting Role
2016	Fog in August		
2016	The Devil's Mistress	as Joseph Goebbels	
2018	Perfume	TV series	
2018	A Hidden Life	A Terrence Malick film	
2018	The Dark		
2019	Nobadi	Director	
2020	Resistance		
2025	The Phoenician Scheme		
2025	Our Girls		
