= The Devil's Mistress (2016 film) =

2016 Czech–Slovak historical film

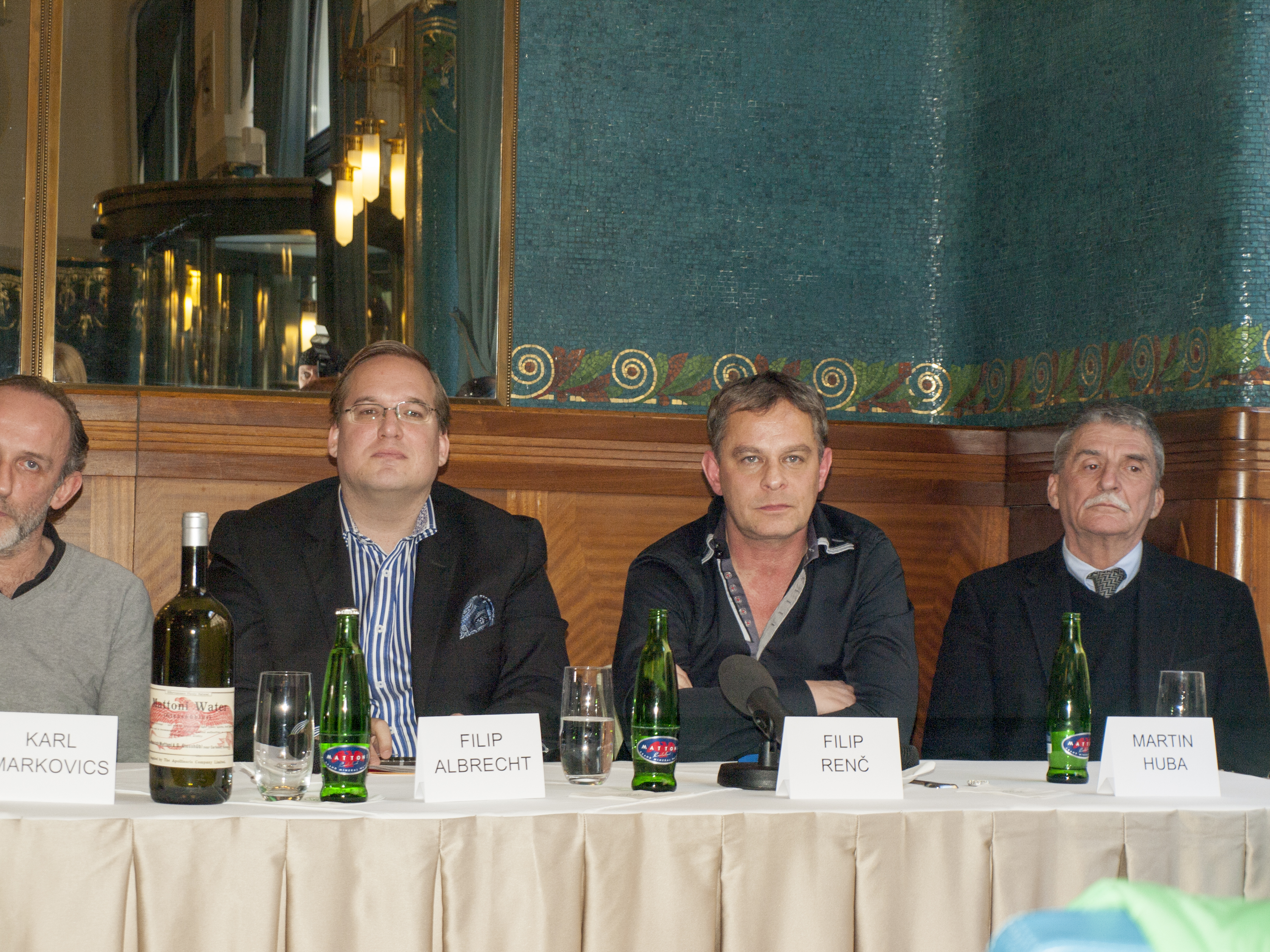
Photos from a press conference from 3.2.2015

The Devil's Mistress (Czech: Lída Baarová) is a 2016 Czech–Slovak historical biography film directed by Filip Renč and produced by Jiří Jurtin. The film stars the Slovak actress Tatiana Pauhofová who plays Lída Baarová, the mistress of Nazi propaganda minister Joseph Goebbels. Lída Baarová was a star actress in Czechoslovakia, later moving to Germany to appear in the film Barcarole. There, she would be roped into the life of Joseph Goebbels and into the political lives of the Nazi Party elite.

== Synopsis and summary ==
The film largely centers around the experiences of Lída Baarová and her feelings regarding the moral dilemma of being romantically involved with a senior Nazi officer. Political and social turmoil within the early Nazi Germany are also shown, with the ending of the film featuring the events of Kristallnacht. Jewish persecution is also a feature of this film, but this is opposed by the colorful depictions of Nazi brass engaging in quaint social festivities. The film never shows crude depictions of the Holocaust, but instead shows the lighter side of the upper crust of Nazi Germany's officials.

Inner politics of Nazi Germany is also shown, with interactions between Goebbels and Adolf Hitler showing Goebbels facing repercussions by the Führer for his failings, while Baarová is blacklisted from Nazi film.

The family of Goebbels and the families of other Nazi Party members feature in this film, again adding to the personal aspect of the movie.

== Cast ==
- Tatiana Pauhofová as Lída Baarová
- Karl Markovics as Joseph Goebbels
- Gedeon Burkhard as Gustav Fröhlich
- Simona Stašová as Mrs. Babková, Lída's mother
- Martin Huba as Mr. Babka, Lída's father
- Pavel Kříž as Adolf Hitler
- Anna Fialová as a young Zorka, Lída's younger sister
- Zdenka Procházková as an older Lída Baarová
- Lenka Vlasáková as Magda Goebbels, the wife of Joseph Goebbels
- Jiří Mádl as Hans Fischer
- Matej Dadák as Miloš Havel
- Jan Révai as Diether von Wedel

== Nominations and reception ==
Award	Category	Actor/Cast	Received
Czech Lion Awards	Best Supporting Actress	Simona Stašová	Nominated
Czech Lion Awards	Best Art Direction	Zdeněk Flemming	Nominated
Czech Lion Awards	Best Music	Ondřej Soukup	Nominated

The film, while doing quite well in the Czech Republic, did not do too well on the international market. The film received a 70% rating on Novinky.cz.
