= Nobadi =

2019 film

- Film poster
- Directed by: Karl Markovics
- Starring: Heinz Trixner
- Release date: 7 September 2019 (TIFF)
- Country: Austria
- Language: German

Nobadi is a 2019 Austrian drama film directed by Karl Markovics. It was screened in the Contemporary World Cinema section at the 2019 Toronto International Film Festival.

== Cast ==
- Heinz Trixner as Robert Senft
- Borhanulddin Hassan Zadeh as Adib Ghubar
