= Magenta (film) =

- Directed by: Gregory C. Haynes
- Written by: Gregory C. Haynes
- Produced by: Bill and Michael Talerico
- Starring: Julian McMahon; Alison Storry; Marklen Kennedy; Crystal Atkins
- Cinematography: Mark Anthony Galluzzo
- Edited by: Paul Osborne
- Music by: Harald Kloser; Thomas Schobel (co-composer)
- Release date: 1996
- Running time: 91 minutes
- Country: United States
- Language: English

Magenta is a 1996 film by Gregory C. Haynes.

== Plot ==
Michael Walsh, a husband and father, falls for a girl named Magenta. The difficulty is that Magenta is his wife's underaged sister. Magenta is persistent in pursuing Michael, though, and this provides the drama in the story.

== Cast ==
- Julian McMahon as Michael Walsh
- Alison Storry as Helen Walsh
- Marklen Kennedy as Craig
- Crystal Dillan Atkins as Magenta
- Fields Company as Dr. Fields
- Gedeon Burkhard as Roy
