= Duke of Magenta =

Duke of Magenta may refer to:

- Duke of Magenta (horse) (1875–1899), American racehorse
- Patrice de MacMahon, 1st Duke of Magenta (1808–1893), French military leader and politician
- MacMahon family, Dukes of Magenta, descendants of Patrice de MacMahon
