= Martin Weinek =

Austrian actor (born 1964)

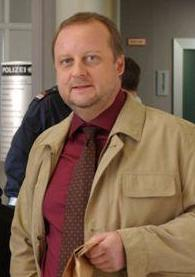
- Weinek, circa 2008
- Born: Martin Weinek; 30 June 1964 (age 62); Leoben, Austria
- Occupation: Actor
- Spouse: Eva Weinek

Martin Weinek (born 30 June 1964 in Leoben, Styria) is an Austrian actor, perhaps best known for his role in the television series Inspector Rex (as Inspector Fritz Kunz). He also produces wine in Austria.

== Biography ==
Weinek studied drama from 1983 to 1986 under Professor Peter P. Jost.

From 1986, he had an acting part for Group 80 at the theaters in Vienna and had a small part in the film Nachsaison (After-season), where he played the role of an elevator boy.

In the year 1987, he played at Recklinghausen festivals under the direction of Georg Mittendrein in The Lechner Edi looks into Paradise and as a street-sweeper in the film Müllomania under the director Dieter Berner. He had acting commitments at the Jura Soyfertheater Vienna from 1988 to 1989, as well as commitments at other theater stages. He also became active as a director, a participant in dramatics and production, which were followed by the artistic management of the Hernalser City Theater from 1990 to 1991.

At intervals, Weinek became active in film and television, such as the 1989 television series Calafati Joe.

== Winemaking ==
Besides acting, Weinek is also a wine-grower, assisted by his wife, Eva. Eva previously worked as a dramatist after studying drama. The two started wine-growing as a hobby in 1993. They have a farm with three hectares of vineyard near Heiligenbrunn.

== Filmography ==
- 1989: Calafati Joe (TV series)
- 1999–2004, 2008- : Inspector Rex (TV series)
- 2004: Silentium
- 2005: Grenzverkehr
- 2006: Unter weißen Segeln (Episode Träume am Horizont)
- 2007: Die Rosenheim-Cops (Episode Liebe bis zum Ende)
