= List of Inspector Rex episodes =

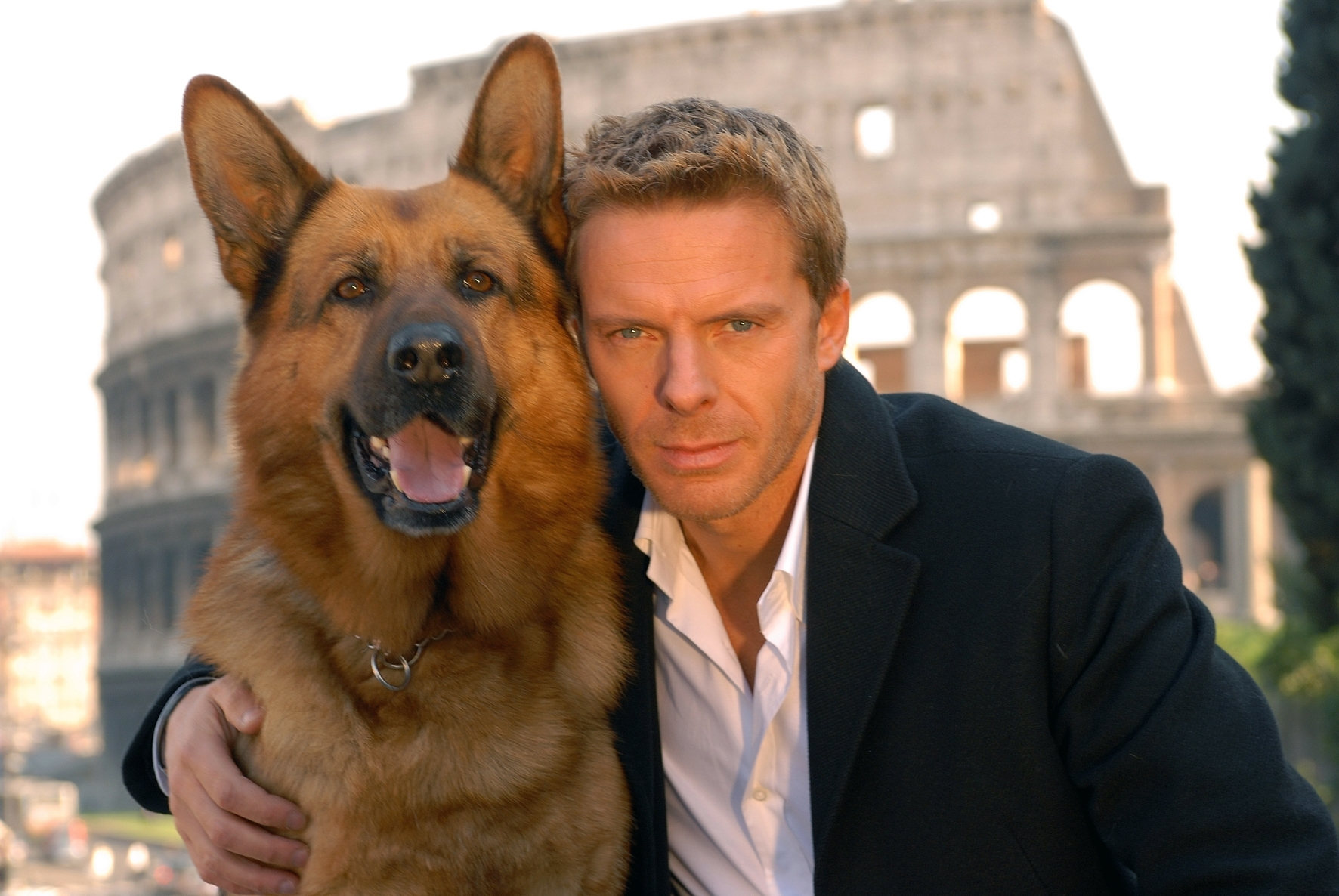
Advertising photo of Kaspar Capparoni with Rex (2008 year)

The following is a list of episodes of the Austrian television series Inspector Rex, which premiered on 10 November 1994, on ORF 1.

After a hiatus, the series resumed on 13 April 2026. There are six new feature film-length episodes, filmed in Vienna.

Seasons: 1 2 3 4 5 6 7 8 9 10 11 12 13 14 15 16 17 18 · References

== Series overview ==
| Series | Episodes | Originally released | | |
| Series | Episodes | First released | Last released | Network |
|---|---|---|---|---|
| 1 | 14 | 10 November 1994 | 9 February 1995 | ORF |
| 2 | 15 | 19 October 1995 | 22 February 1996 | ORF |
| 3 | 12 | 24 October 1996 | 9 January 1997 | ORF |
| 4 | 13 | 8 January 1998 | 26 March 1998 | ORF |
| 5 | 13 | 28 January 1999 | 22 April 1999 | ORF |
| 6 | 12 | 16 February 2000 | 10 May 2000 | ORF |
| 7 | 10 | 28 March 2001 | 30 May 2001 | ORF |
| 8 | 13 | 9 October 2002 | 15 January 2003 | ORF |
| 9 | 13 | 27 November 2003 | 18 March 2004 | ORF |
| 10 | 4 | 28 September 2004 | 19 October 2004 | ORF |
| 11 | 8 | 29 January 2008 | 19 February 2008 | RAI |
| 12 | 11 | 17 March 2009 | 13 April 2009 | RAI |
| 13 | 12 | 14 June 2011 | 19 July 2011 | RAI |
| 14 | 12 | 3 November 2011 | 11 November 2011 | RAI |
| 15 | 12 | 26 November 2012 | 11 February 2013 | RAI |
| 16 | 11 | 20 December 2013 | 20 January 2014 | RAI |
| 17 | 12 | 31 March 2014 | 5 May 2014 | RAI |
| 18 | 12 | 27 February 2015 | 19 June 2015 | RAI |

== Episodes ==
=== Season 1 (1994–1995) ===
| No. overall | No. in series | Title | English title | Directed by | Written by | Original release date |
|---|---|---|---|---|---|---|
| 1 | 1 | "Endstation Wien" | Last Stop: Vienna | Hajo Gies | Peter Hajek & Peter Moser | November 10, 1994 |
| 2 | 2 | "Ein perfekter Mord" | The Perfect Murder | Hajo Gies | Peter Hajek & Peter Moser | November 17, 1994 |
| 3 | 3 | "Flucht in den Tod" | Escape to Death | Oliver Hirschbiegel | Peter Hajek & Peter Moser | November 24, 1994 |
| 4 | 4 | "Der Tod der alten Damen" | The Old Lady Murders | Oliver Hirschbiegel | Peter Hajek & Peter Moser | December 1, 1994 |
| 5 | 5 | "Tanz auf dem Vulkan" | Dance on the Volcano | Detlef Rönfeldt | Peter Hajek & Peter Moser | December 8, 1994 |
| 6 | 6 | "Die Tote von Schönbrunn" | Murder in Schönbrunn | Detlef Rönfeldt | Peter Hajek & Peter Moser | December 15, 1994 |
| 7 | 7 | "Diagnose Mord" | Diagnosis: Murder | Detlef Rönfeldt | Peter Hajek & Peter Moser | December 22, 1994 |
| 8 | 8 | "Ein feines Haus" | A Most Pleasant Establishment | Bodo Fürneisen | Peter Hajek & Peter Moser | December 29, 1994 |
| 9 | 9 | "Amok" | Amok | Bodo Fürneisen | Peter Hajek & Peter Moser | January 5, 1995 |
| 10 | 10 | "Der erste Preis" | First Prize | Oliver Hirschbiegel | Peter Hajek & Peter Moser | January 12, 1995 |
| 11 | 11 | "Tödliche Teddys" | Deadly Teddies | Oliver Hirschbiegel | Peter Hajek & Peter Moser | January 19, 1995 |
| 12 | 12 | "Bring mir den Kopf von Beethoven" | Bring Me Beethoven's Head | Oliver Hirschbiegel | Peter Hajek & Peter Moser | January 26, 1995 |
| 13 | 13 | "Unter den Strassen von Wien" | Under the Streets of Vienna | Oliver Hirschbiegel | Peter Hajek & Peter Moser | February 2, 1995 |
| 14 | 14 | "Schüsse auf Rex" | Target Rex | Wolfgang Dickmann | Peter Hajek & Peter Moser | February 9, 1995 |

=== Season 2 (1995–1996) ===
| No. overall | No. in series | Title | English title | Directed by | Written by | Original release date |
|---|---|---|---|---|---|---|
| 15 | 1 | "Stumme Schreie" | Silent Screams | Udo Witte | Peter Hajek & Peter Moser | October 19, 1995 |
| 16 | 2 | "Blutspuren" | Traces of Blood | Udo Witte | Peter Hajek & Peter Moser | October 27, 1995 |
| 17 | 3 | "Ein mörderischer Sommer" | Murderous Summer | Udo Witte | Peter Hajek & Peter Moser | November 2, 1995 |
| 18 | 4 | "Tödliche Verführung" | Deadly Seduction | Wolfgang Dickmann | Peter Hajek & Peter Moser | November 9, 1995 |
| 19 | 5 | "Der maskierte Tod" | Masked Death | Herrmann Zschoche | Peter Hajek & Peter Moser | November 16, 1995 |
| 20 | 6 | "Die blinde Zeugin" | The Blind Witness | Hans Werner | Peter Hajek & Peter Moser | November 23, 1995 |
| 21 | 7 | "Gefährliche Jagd" | Dangerous Hunt | Hans Werner | Peter Hajek & Peter Moser | November 30, 1995 |
| 22 | 8 | "Tod eines Kindes" | Death of a Child | Hans Werner | Peter Hajek & Peter Moser | December 7, 1995 |
| 23 | 9 | "Im Zeichen des Satans" | The Sign of Satan | Hans Werner | Peter Hajek & Peter Moser | December 14, 1995 |
| 24 | 10 | "Der Duft des Todes" | The Scent of Death | Hans Werner | Peter Hajek & Peter Moser | December 21, 1995 |
| 25 | 11 | "Entführt" | Kidnapped | Wolfgang Dickmann | Peter Hajek & Peter Moser | December 28, 1995 |
| 26 | 12 | "Tödliche Dosis" | Deadly Doses | Bodo Fürneisen | Peter Hajek & Oliver Hirschbiegel | January 11, 1996 |
| 27 | 13 | "Drei Sekunden bis zum Tod" | Three Seconds to Death | Bodo Fürneisen | Melitta Fitzer | January 25, 1996 |
| 28 | 14 | "Über den Dächern von Wien" | Over the Rooftops of Vienna | Oliver Hirschbiegel | Peter Hajek & Peter Moser | February 15, 1996 |
| 29 | 15 | "Stockis letzter Fall" | Stocki's Last Case | Oliver Hirschbiegel | Peter Hajek & Peter Moser | February 22, 1996 |

=== Season 3 (1996–1997) ===
| No. overall | No. in series | Title | English title | Directed by | Written by | Original release date |
|---|---|---|---|---|---|---|
| 30 | 1 | "Todesrennen" | Deadly Race | Oliver Hirschbiegel | Peter Hajek & Peter Moser | October 24, 1996 |
| 31 | 2 | "Stadt in Angst" | City in Fear | Oliver Hirschbiegel | Peter Hajek & Peter Moser | October 31, 1996 |
| 32 | 3 | "Tod im Museum" | Death in the Museum | Oliver Hirschbiegel | Peter Hajek & Peter Moser | November 7, 1996 |
| 33 | 4 | "Mörderische Leidenschaft" | Lethal Passion | Wolfgang Dickmann | Peter Hajek & Peter Moser | November 14, 1996 |
| 34 | 5 | "Annas Geheimnis" | Anna's Secret | Wolfgang Dickmann | Peter Hajek & Peter Moser | November 21, 1996 |
| 35 | 6 | "Der Puppenmörder" | The Doll Murderer | Oliver Hirschbiegel | Peter Hajek & Peter Moser | November 28, 1996 |
| 36 | 7 | "Unter Hypnose" | Under Hypnosis | Wolfgang Dickmann | Peter Hajek & Peter Moser | December 5, 1996 |
| 37 | 8 | "Jagd nach einer Toten" | Hunt for a Corpse | Wolfgang Dickmann | Peter Hajek & Peter Moser | December 12, 1996 |
| 38 | 9 | "Warum starb Romeo?" | Why Did Romeo Die? | Oliver Hirschbiegel | Bernhard Schärfl | December 19, 1996 |
| 39 | 10 | "Ein Engel auf vier Pfoten" | Angel on Four Paws | Hans Werner | Peter Hajek & Peter Moser | December 26, 1996 |
| 40 | 11 | "Mord á la carte" | Murder á la carte | Oliver Hirschbiegel | Angelika Hager, Chuck Randolph | January 2, 1997 |
| 41 | 12 | "Blutrote Rosen" | Blood Red Roses | Hans Werner | Peter Hajek & Peter Moser | January 9, 1997 |

=== Season 4 (1998) ===
| No. overall | No. in series | Title | English title | Directed by | Written by | Original release date |
|---|---|---|---|---|---|---|
| 42 | 1 | "Lebendig begraben" | Buried Alive | Peter Carpentier | Bernhard Schärfl | January 8, 1998 |
| 43 | 2 | "Tod eines Schülers" | Death of a Student | Peter Carpentier | Ralph Werner | January 15, 1998 |
| 44 | 3 | "Ein mörderischer Plan" | A Deadly Plan | Peter Carpentier | Bernhard Schärfl | January 22, 1998 |
| 45 | 4 | "Mosers Tod" | Moser's Death | Hans Werner | Peter Hajek & Peter Moser | January 25, 1998 |
| 46 | 5 | "Der Neue" | The New Guy | Udo Witte | Peter Hajek & Peter Moser | February 1, 1998 |
| 47 | 6 | "Der Mann mit den tausend Gesichtern" | The Man with a Thousand Faces | Udo Witte | Peter Hajek & Peter Moser | February 5, 1998 |
| 48 | 7 | "Die Verschwörung" | The Conspiracy | Bodo Fürneisen | Bernhard Schärfl | February 12, 1998 |
| 49 | 8 | "Tödliche Leidenschaft" | Deadly Passion | Bodo Fürneisen | Peter Hajek & Peter Moser | February 19, 1998 |
| 50 | 9 | "Geraubtes Glück" | Stolen Happiness | Bodo Fürneisen | Peter Hajek & Peter Moser | February 26, 1998 |
| 51 | 10 | "Rache" | Revenge | Peter Carpentier | Peter Hajek & Peter Moser | March 5, 1998 |
| 52 | 11 | "Der Voyeur" | The Voyeur | Hans Werner | Bernhard Schärfl | March 12, 1998 |
| 53 | 12 | "Das letzte Match" | The Last Match | Hans Werner | Peter Hajek & Peter Moser | March 19, 1998 |
| 54 | 13 | "Gefährlicher Auftrag" | Dangerous Mission | Hans Werner | Peter Hajek & Peter Moser | March 26, 1998 |

=== Season 5 (1999) ===
| No. overall | No. in series | Title | English title | Directed by | Written by | Original release date |
|---|---|---|---|---|---|---|
| 55 | 1 | "Die Todesliste" | The Hit List | Peter Carpentier | Peter Hajek & Peter Moser | January 28, 1999 |
| 56 | 2 | "Furchtbare Wahrheit" | Terrible Truth | Peter Carpentier | Bernhard Schärfl | February 4, 1999 |
| 57 | 3 | "Priester in Gefahr" | Priest in Danger | Peter Carpentier | Peter Hajek & Peter Moser | February 11, 1999 |
| 58 | 4 | "Der Verlierer" | The Loser | Michael Riebl | Rigobert Mayer | February 18, 1999 |
| 59 | 5 | "Trügerische Nähe" | Treacherous Love | Michael Riebl | Bernhard Schärfl | February 25, 1999 |
| 60 | 6 | "Rex rächt sich" | Rex's Revenge | Olaf Kreinsen | Peter Hajek & Peter Moser | March 4, 1999 |
| 61 | 7 | "Blinde Wut" | Blind Rage | Olaf Kreinsen | Peter Hajek & Peter Moser | March 11, 1999 |
| 62 | 8 | "Giftgas" | Poisonous Gas | Bodo Fürneisen | Peter Hajek & Peter Moser | March 18, 1999 |
| 63 | 9 | "Tödliche Geheimnisse" | Deadly Secrets | Olaf Kreinsen | Bernhard Schärfl | March 25, 1999 |
| 64 | 10 | "Das Testament" | The Will | Bodo Fürneisen | Peter Hajek & Peter Moser | April 1, 1999 |
| 65 | 11 | "Mörderisches Spielzeug" | Murderous Toys | Bodo Fürneisen | Bernhard Schärfl | April 8, 1999 |
| 66 | 12 | "Hetzjagd" | The Hunt | Hans Werner | Bernhard Schärfl | April 15, 1999 |
| 67 | 13 | "Sisi" | Sisi | Hans Werner | Peter Hajek & Peter Moser | April 22, 1999 |

=== Season 6 (2000) ===
| No. overall | No. in series | Title | English title | Directed by | Written by | Original release date |
|---|---|---|---|---|---|---|
| 68 | 1 | "Vollgas" | Full Power | Michael Riebl | Peter Hajek & Peter Moser | February 16, 2000 |
| 69 | 2 | "Kinder auf der Flucht" | Children on the Run | Peter Carpentier | Bernhard Schärfl | March 1, 2000 |
| 70 | 3 | "Baby in Gefahr" | Baby in Danger | Michael Riebl | Peter Hajek & Peter Moser | March 8, 2000 |
| 71 | 4 | "Telefonterror" | Telephone Terror | Peter Carpentier | Peter Hajek & Peter Moser | March 15, 2000 |
| 72 | 5 | "Eiskalt" | Ice Cold | Michael Riebl | Bernhard Schärfl | March 22, 2000 |
| 73 | 6 | "Brudermord" | Brother Murder | Michael Riebl | Ralph Werner | March 29, 2000 |
| 74 | 7 | "Tödliches Tarot" | Deadly Tarot | Michael Riebl | Ulrike and Hans Münch | April 5, 2000 |
| 75 | 8 | "Der Vollmondmörder" | The Full Moon Murderer | Hans Werner | Peter Hajek & Peter Moser | April 12, 2000 |
| 76 | 9 | "Ein Toter kehrt zurück" | The Dead Man Returns | Hans Werner | Bernhard Schärfl | April 19, 2000 |
| 77 | 10 | "Tod per Internet" | Death via the Internet | Hans Werner | Peter Hajek & Peter Moser | April 26, 2000 |
| 78 | 11 | "Jagd nach dem ewigen Leben" | Quest for Eternal Life | Bodo Fürneisen | Peter Hajek & Peter Moser | May 3, 2000 |
| 79 | 12 | "Das Millionenpferd" | The Million Dollar Horse | Bodo Fürneisen | Peter Zingler | May 10, 2000 |

=== Season 7 (2001) ===
| No. overall | No. in series | Title | English title | Directed by | Written by | Original release date |
|---|---|---|---|---|---|---|
| 80 | 1 | "In letzter Sekunde" | In the Last Second | Gerald Liegel | Peter Hajek & Peter Moser | March 28, 2001 |
| 81 | 2 | "Die Babydealer" | The Baby Dealer | Michael Riebl | Ralph Werner | April 4, 2001 |
| 82 | 3 | "Der schöne Tod" | Beautiful Death | Michael Riebl | Peter Hajek & Peter Moser | April 11, 2001 |
| 83 | 4 | "Der Bluff" | The Bluff | Pete Ariel | Rainer Hackstock | April 18, 2001 |
| 84 | 5 | "Ein todsicherer Tipp" | A Dead Certain Trap | Christian Görlitz | Peter Hajek & Peter Moser | April 25, 2001 |
| 85 | 6 | "Tödlicher Test" | Deadly Test | Christian Görlitz | Bernhard Schärfl | May 2, 2001 |
| 86 | 7 | "Besessen" | Obsessed | Pete Ariel | Peter Hajek & Peter Moser | May 9, 2001 |
| 87 | 8 | "Das Mädchen und der Mörder" | The Girl and the Murderer | Pete Ariel | Peter Zingler | May 16, 2001 |
| 88 | 9 | "Der Tod kam zweimal" | Death Came Twice | Bodo Fürneisen | Angelika Hager | May 23, 2001 |
| 89 | 10 | "Strahlen der Rache" | Rays of Revenge | Christian Görlitz | Peter Hajek & Peter Moser | May 30, 2001 |

=== Season 8 (2002–2003) ===
| No. overall | No. in series | Title | English title | Directed by | Written by | Original release date |
|---|---|---|---|---|---|---|
| 90 | 1 | "Polizisten küsst man nicht!" | Don't Kiss the Policeman! | Hajo Gies | Peter Hajek & Peter Moser | October 9, 2002 |
| 91 | 2 | "Tricks an der Theke" | Cheat at the Bar | Gerald Liegel | Peter Hajek & Peter Moser | October 16, 2002 |
| 92 | 3 | "Senkrecht in den Tod" | Straight to Death | Andreas Prochaska | Carl-Christian Demke | October 23, 2002 |
| 93 | 4 | "Ein Zeuge auf vier Pfoten" | Four Legged Witness | Michael Riebl | Carl-Christian Demke | October 30, 2002 |
| 94 | 5 | "Wenn Kinder sterben wollen..." | When Children Want to Die... | Andreas Prochaska | Ralf Kinder | November 6, 2002 |
| 95 | 6 | "Bis zur letzten Kugel" | Up to the Last Bullet | Wilhelm Engelhardt | Peter Moser | November 13, 2002 |
| 96 | 7 | "Die Taten der Toten" | The Acts of the Dead | Wilhelm Engelhardt | Bernhard Schärfl | November 20, 2002 |
| 97 | 8 | "Einer stirbt immer" | Someone Dies Every Time | Michael Riebl | Karl Benedikter | November 27, 2002 |
| 98 | 9 | "Blond, hübsch, tot" | Blonde, Pretty, Dead | Andreas Prochaska | Peter Hajek & Peter Moser | December 4, 2002 |
| 99 | 10 | "Happy Birthday" | Happy Birthday | Wilhelm Engelhardt | Peter Hajek & Peter Moser | December 11, 2002 |
| 100 | 11 | "Verliebt in einen Mörder" | In Love with a Murderer | Hajo Gies | Peter Hajek & Peter Moser | December 18, 2002 |
| 101 | 12 | "Berühmt um jeden Preis" | Famous at Any Price | Hajo Gies | Bernhard Schärfl | January 8, 2003 |
| 102 | 13 | "Der Fluch der Mumie" | The Mummy's Curse | Gerald Liegel | Peter Hajek & Peter Moser | January 15, 2003 |

=== Season 9 (2003–2004) ===
| No. overall | No. in series | Title | English title | Directed by | Written by | Original release date |
|---|---|---|---|---|---|---|
| 103 | 1 | "Attentat auf Rex" | The Attempted Assassination of Rex | Michael Riebl | Peter Hajek & Peter Moser | November 27, 2003 |
| 104 | 2 | "Wofür Kinder leiden müssen" | Why Must Children Suffer | Andreas Prochaska | Peter Hajek & Peter Moser | December 4, 2003 |
| 105 | 3 | "Ettrichs Taube" | Ettrich's Pigeons | Gerald Liegel | Karl Benedikter | December 11, 2003 |
| 106 | 4 | "Vitamine zum Sterben" | Vitamins for Dying | Michael Riebl | Peter Moser | December 18, 2003 |
| 107 | 5 | "Nachts im Spital" | A Night at the Hospital | Andreas Prochaska | Bernhard Schärfl | January 15, 2004 |
| 108 | 6 | "Das Donaukrokodil" | The Danube Crocodile | Michael Riebl | Susanne Freund | January 22, 2004 |
| 109 | 7 | "Eine Tote hinter Gittern (Mord im Gefängnis)" | Death Behind Bars | Hans Werner | Peter Moser | January 29, 2004 |
| 110 | 8 | "Nina um Mitternacht" | Nina at Midnight | Hans Werner | Peter Hajek & Peter Moser | February 5, 2004 |
| 111 | 9 | "Schnappschuss" | Snapshot | Andreas Prochaska | Ralf Kinder | February 19, 2004 |
| 112 | 10 | "Die Leiche lebte noch" | The Corpse Lived On | Gerald Liegel | Peter Hajek & Peter Moser | February 26, 2004 |
| 113 | 11 | "Hexen und andere Frauen" | Witches and Other Women | Gerald Liegel | Karl Benedikter | March 4, 2004 |
| 114 | 12 | "Ein Toter und ein Baby" | A Dead Man and a Baby | Gerald Liegel | Bernhard Schärfl | March 11, 2004 |
| 115 | 13 | "Sein letzter Sonntag" | His Last Sunday | Andreas Prochaska | Susanne Freund | March 18, 2004 |

=== Season 10 (2004) ===
| No. overall | No. in series | Title | English title | Directed by | Written by | Original release date |
|---|---|---|---|---|---|---|
| 116 | 1 | "E-Mail von der Mörderin" | E-mail from the Murderer | Andreas Prochaska | Peter Hajek & Peter Moser | September 28, 2004 |
| 117 | 2 | "Ein Mann ohne Gedächtnis" | Man with No Memory | Christian Görlitz | Michael Klette, Thomas Teubner | October 5, 2004 |
| 118 | 3 | "Endlich ist die Bestie tot" | Finally the Beast is Dead | Christian Görlitz | Michael Klette, Thomas Teubner | October 12, 2004 |
| 119 | 4 | "Doping" | Doping | Christian Görlitz | Peter Moser | October 19, 2004 |

=== Season 11 (2008) ===
| No. overall | No. in series | Title | English title | Directed by | Written by | Original release date |
|---|---|---|---|---|---|---|
| 120 | 1 | "L'incontro" | A New Beginning | Marco Serafini | Stefano Piani | January 29, 2008 |
| 121 | 2 | "Calibro 7.65" | 7.65 Millimeter | Marco Serafini | Stefano Piani | January 29, 2008 |
| 122 | 3 | "Ombre cinesi" | Chinese Shadows | Marco Serafini | Alessandra Acciai | February 5, 2008 |
| 123 | 4 | "Impara l'arte" | A Deadly Review | Marco Serafini | Giulio Calvani, Fabrizio Cestaro | February 5, 2008 |
| 124 | 5 | "Non è tutt'oro" | The Beautiful Appearance | Marco Serafini | Fabrizio Cestaro, Federico Favot | February 12, 2008 |
| 125 | 6 | "Mamma Chioccia" | Motherly Love | Marco Serafini | Giulio Calvani, Fabrizio Cestaro | February 12, 2008 |
| 126 | 7 | "In vino veritas" | In Vino Veritas | Marco Serafini | Alessandra Acciai | February 19, 2008 |
| 127 | 8 | "Lontano da qui" | Far Away from Here | Marco Serafini | Fabrizio Cestaro, Federico Favot | February 19, 2008 |

=== Season 12 (2009) ===
| No. overall | No. in series | Title | English title | Directed by | Written by | Original release date |
|---|---|---|---|---|---|---|
| 128 | 1 | "Vite in pericolo" | A Life in Peril | Marco Serafini | Federico Favot | March 17, 2009 |
| 129 | 2 | "Morte tra i delfini" | Death Among the Dolphins | Marco Serafini | Giulio Calvani | March 17, 2009 |
| 130 | 3 | "La scuola della paura" | The School of Fear | Marco Serafini | Giulio Calvani | March 24, 2009 |
| 131 | 4 | "Affari di famiglia" | Family Matters | Marco Serafini | Alberto Ostini | March 24, 2009 |
| 132 | 5 | "La mamma è sempre la mamma" | Mama Will Always Be Mama | Marco Serafini | Alberto Ostini | March 31, 2009 |
| 133 | 6 | "Masquerade" | Masquerade | Marco Serafini | Giulio Calvani | March 31, 2009 |
| 134 | 7 | "L'ultima scommessa" | The Last Bet | Marco Serafini | Federico Favot | April 8, 2009 |
| 135 | 8 | "Un uomo solo" | A Man Alone | Marco Serafini | Federico Favot | April 8, 2009 |
| 136 | 9 | "Il colore del silenzio" | The Color of Silence | Marco Serafini | Alberto Ostini | April 13, 2009 |
| 137 | 10 | "Il tombarolo" | The Graverobber | Marco Serafini | Stefano Piani | April 13, 2009 |
| 138 | 11 | "L'ultima partita" | The Final Match | Gerald Liegel | Pia Hierzegger, Peter Hajek & Peter Moser | April 12, 2009 |

=== Season 13 (2011) ===
| No. overall | No. in series | Title | English title | Directed by | Written by | Original release date |
|---|---|---|---|---|---|---|
| 139 | 1 | "Il campione" | The Champion | Marco Serafini | Luca Zesi | June 14, 2011 |
| 140 | 2 | "Centauri" | Centaurs | Marco Serafini | Francesco Arlanch, Francesco Balletta | June 14, 2011 |
| 141 | 3 | "L'ululato" | The Howling | Marco Serafini | Stefano Piani, Alberto Ostini | June 21, 2011 |
| 142 | 4 | "La mia banda suona il rock" | My Band Plays Rock | Marco Serafini | Giovanni Robbiano | June 21, 2011 |
| 143 | 5 | "Minuti contati" | The Nick of Time | Marco Serafini | Federico Favot | June 28, 2011 |
| 144 | 6 | "Bravi ragazzi" | Good Boys | Marco Serafini | Alessandro Fabbri, Valeria Colasanti, Tiziana Martini | June 28, 2011 |
| 145 | 7 | "Occhi di gatto" | Cat's Eyes | Marco Serafini | Giulio Calvani | July 5, 2011 |
| 146 | 8 | "I nomi delle stelle" | The Names of the Stars | Marco Serafini | Francesco Arlanch, Francesco Balletta | July 5, 2011 |
| 147 | 9 | "Un caso freddo" | Cold Case | Marco Serafini | Alberto Ostini | July 12, 2011 |
| 148 | 10 | "Musica maestro!" | Music Please Maestro | Marco Serafini | Alessandro Fabbri, Valeria Colasanti, Tiziana Martini | July 12, 2011 |
| 149 | 11 | "La ragazza scomparsa" | The Girl Who Vanished | Marco Serafini | Stefano Sudriè | July 19, 2011 |
| 150 | 12 | "La maledizione del Caravaggio" | The Curse of Caravaggio | Marco Serafini | Peter Lohner | July 19, 2011 |

=== Season 14 (2011) ===
| No. overall | No. in series | Title | English title | Directed by | Written by | Original release date |
|---|---|---|---|---|---|---|
| 151 | 1 | "Ombre" | Shadows | Andrea Costantini | Florian Iwersen | March 1, 2013 |
| 152 | 2 | "In mezzo ai lupi" | Amidst the Wolves | Andrea Costantini | Regine Bielefeldt | March 1, 2013 |
| 153 | 3 | "Gioco sottobanco" | Games Under the Counter | Andrea Costantini | Daniel Maximilian, Thomas Pauli | March 8, 2013 |
| 154 | 4 | "Una promessa dal passato" | A Promise from the Past | Andrea Costantini | Andrea Costantini | March 8, 2013 |
| 155 | 5 | "Vendetta" | Vendetta | Andrea Costantini | Peter Lohner, Davide Solinas | March 15, 2013 |
| 156 | 6 | "Profondo blu" | Deep Blue | Andrea Costantini | Alessandro Fabbri, Valeria Colasanti, Tiziana Martini | March 15, 2013 |
| 157 | 7 | "La casa degli spiriti" | The House of the Ghosts | Andrea Costantini | Daniel Maximilian, Thomas Pauli | March 22, 2013 |
| 158 | 8 | "Tutto in una notte" | All in One Night | Andrea Costantini | Federico Favot | March 22, 2013 |
| 159 | 9 | "Una vita per una vita" | A Life for a Life | Marco Serafini | Florian Iwersen | March 29, 2013 |
| 160 | 10 | "Il terzo uomo" | The Third Man | Marco Serafini | Daniel Maximilian, Thomas Pauli | March 29, 2013 |
| 161 | 11 | "Bandiera a mezz'asta" | Flags at Half-Mast | Marco Serafini | Giulio Calvani | April 5, 2013 |
| 162 | 12 | "Sinfonia imperfetta" | Imperfect Symphony | Marco Serafini | Iole Masucci | April 5, 2013 |

=== Season 15 (2012-2013) ===
| No. overall | No. in series | Title | English title | Directed by | Written by | Original release date |
|---|---|---|---|---|---|---|
| 163 | 1 | "La Tigre" | The Tiger | Marco Serafini | Daniel Maximilian, Thomas Pauli, Stefano Anghelè | April 12, 2013 |
| 164 | 2 | "Superstar" | Superstar | Marco Serafini | Peter Lohner, Stefano Anghelè | April 12, 2013 |
| 165 | 3 | "Un delitto quasi perfetto" | The Almost Perfect Crime | Fernando Muraca | Daniel Maximilian, Thomas Pauli, Stefano Anghelè | April 19, 2013 |
| 166 | 4 | "Il tempo non guarisce le ferite" | Time Heals No Wounds | Fernando Muraca | Regine Bielefeldt, Jacopo Fantastichini, Francesco Favale | April 19, 2013 |
| 167 | 5 | "Una voce nella folla" | A Voice in the Crowd | Andrea Costantini | Davide Solinas | April 26, 2013 |
| 168 | 6 | "L'intruso" | The Intruder | Andrea Costantini | Daniel Maximilian, Thomas Pauli, Emanuela Canonico, Andrea Costantini | April 26, 2013 |
| 169 | 7 | "Due uomini e un bebè" | Two Men and a Baby | Andrea Costantini | Peter Lohner, Stefano Anghelè, Davide Solinas | May 3, 2013 |
| 170 | 8 | "Blackout" | Blackout | Andrea Costantini | Daniel Maximilian, Thomas Pauli, Jacopo Fantastichini, Francesco Favale | May 3, 2013 |
| 171 | 9 | "Un colpo al cuore" | A Knife through the Heart | Andrea Costantini | Luca Zesi | May 10, 2013 |
| 172 | 10 | "Il lato oscuro" | The Dark Side | Andrea Costantini | Bernd Schwamm, Emanuela Canonico, Davide Solinas | May 10, 2013 |
| 173 | 11 | "Il Grigio" | The Grey | Andrea Costantini | Florian Iwersen, Luca Zesi, Andrea Costantini | May 17, 2013 |
| 174 | 12 | "Legami di sangue" | Blood Ties | Andrea Costantini | Florian Iwersen, Stefano Anghelè, Davide Solinas | May 17, 2013 |

=== Season 16 (2014) ===
| No. overall | No. in series | Title | English title | Directed by | Written by | Original release date |
|---|---|---|---|---|---|---|
| 175 | 1 | "Festa di laurea" | Graduation Party | Raffaele Verzillo | Massimo Reale, Monica Zapelli | February 24, 2014 |
| 176 | 2 | "Terzo tempo" | Third Half | Marco Serafini | Jacopo Fantastichini, Francesco Favale | February 24, 2014 |
| 177 | 3 | "Cioccolata amara" | Bitter Chocolate | Marco Serafini | Andrea Oliva | March 3, 2014 |
| 178 | 4 | "Wunderkammer" | Wunderkammer | Marco Serafini | Francesco Cioce | March 3, 2014 |
| 179 | 5 | "Lotta di classe" | Class Struggle | Fernando Muraca | Gianluca Ansanelli | March 10, 2014 |
| 180 | 6 | "Tango assassino" | Tango Assassin | Fernando Muraca | Miranda Pisione | March 10, 2014 |
| 181 | 7 | "Magic Land" | Magicland | Fernando Muraca | Massimo Reale, Antonio Lauro | March 17, 2014 |
| 182 | 8 | "Notte in bianco" | Sleepless Nights | Nicola Perrucci | Massimo Reale, Antonio Lauro | March 17, 2014 |
| 183 | 9 | "A pezzi" | In Pieces | Raffaele Verzillo | Massimo Reale, Antonio Lauro | March 24, 2014 |
| 184 | 10 | "Gli artisti del rimorchio" | Professional Seducers | Nicola Perrucci | Stefano Anghelè | March 24, 2014 |
| 185 | 11 | "L'era glaciale" | Ice Age | Erhard Riedlsperger | Stefan Brunner | March 24, 2014 |

=== Season 17 (2014) ===
| No. overall | No. in series | Title | English title | Directed by | Written by | Original release date |
|---|---|---|---|---|---|---|
| 186 | 1 | "Fratelli" | Brothers | Manetti Bros. | Federico Favot | March 31, 2014 |
| 187 | 2 | "Circolo vizioso" | Vicious Circle | Manetti Bros. | Valeria Cilio | March 31, 2014 |
| 188 | 3 | "Sabbiature" | Sandblasting | Manetti Bros. | Giulio Calvani | April 7, 2014 |
| 189 | 4 | "La madre di tutte le vendette" | The Mother of All Vengeance | Manetti Bros. | Viola Rispoli | April 7, 2014 |
| 190 | 5 | "8 9 3" | Eight Nine Three | Manetti Bros. | Federico Favot, Michelangelo La Neve | April 14, 2014 |
| 191 | 6 | "Il codice Rex" | Code Rex | Manetti Bros. | Andrea Nobile | April 14, 2014 |
| 192 | 7 | "Soldato futuro" | Future Soldier | Manetti Bros. | Antonio Lauro, Massimo Reale | April 21, 2014 |
| 193 | 8 | "Il colore dell acqua" | The Color of Water | Manetti Bros. | Federico Favot | April 21, 2014 |
| 194 | 9 | "N13" | No. 13 | Manetti Bros. | Francesco Cioce | April 28, 2014 |
| 195 | 10 | "L'iniziazione" | Initiation | Manetti Bros. | Salvatore De Mola | April 28, 2014 |
| 196 | 11 | "Alla luce del sole" | In the Light of the Sun | Manetti Bros. | Giulio Calvani, Valerio Cilio, Michelangelo La Neve | May 5, 2014 |
| 197 | 12 | "Gli allegri bucanieri" | Merry Buccaneers | Manetti Bros. | Giulio Calvani, Valerio Cilio, Michelangelo La Neve | May 5, 2014 |

=== Season 18 (2015) ===
| No. overall | No. in series | Title | English title | Directed by | Written by | Original release date |
|---|---|---|---|---|---|---|
| 198 | 1 | "Celeste" | Celeste | Manetti Bros. | Michelangelo La Neve | February 27, 2015 |
| 199 | 2 | "Il cadavere scomparso" | The Missing Corpse | Manetti Bros. | Michelangelo La Neve | February 27, 2015 |
| 200 | 3 | "I giorni della Mantide" | The Days of the Mantis | Manetti Bros. | Cristiano Brignola | March 6, 2015 |
| 201 | 4 | "Il calendario" | The Calendar | Manetti Bros. | Alessandro Aniballi, Giordano De Luca | March 13, 2015 |
| 202 | 5 | "Gelosia" | Jealousy | Manetti Bros. | Alessandro Aniballi, Giordano De Luca | March 20, 2015 |
| 203 | 6 | "Il pettirosso fantasma" | Ghost Robin | Manetti Bros. | Michelangelo La Neve | May 29, 2015 |
| 204 | 7 | "Il sorriso del condannato" | Prisoner's Smile | Manetti Bros. | Michelangelo La Neve | May 29, 2015 |
| 205 | 8 | "Ladri d'autore - prima parte" | Art Thieves: Part 1 | Manetti Bros. | Paolo Baravelli, Cristiano Brignola | June 5, 2015 |
| 206 | 9 | "Ladri d'autore - seconda parte" | Art Thieves: Part 2 | Manetti Bros. | Paolo Baravelli, Cristiano Brignola | June 5, 2015 |
| 207 | 10 | "Effetto placebo" | Placebo Effect | Manetti Bros. | Cristiano Brignola | June 13, 2015 |
| 208 | 11 | "Quarantena" | Quarantine | Manetti Bros. | Massimo Reale | June 13, 2015 |
| 209 | 12 | "Stanza 110" | Room 110 | Manetti Bros. | Federico Favot | June 19, 2015 |
