= Gedeon Burkhard =

German actor (born 1969)

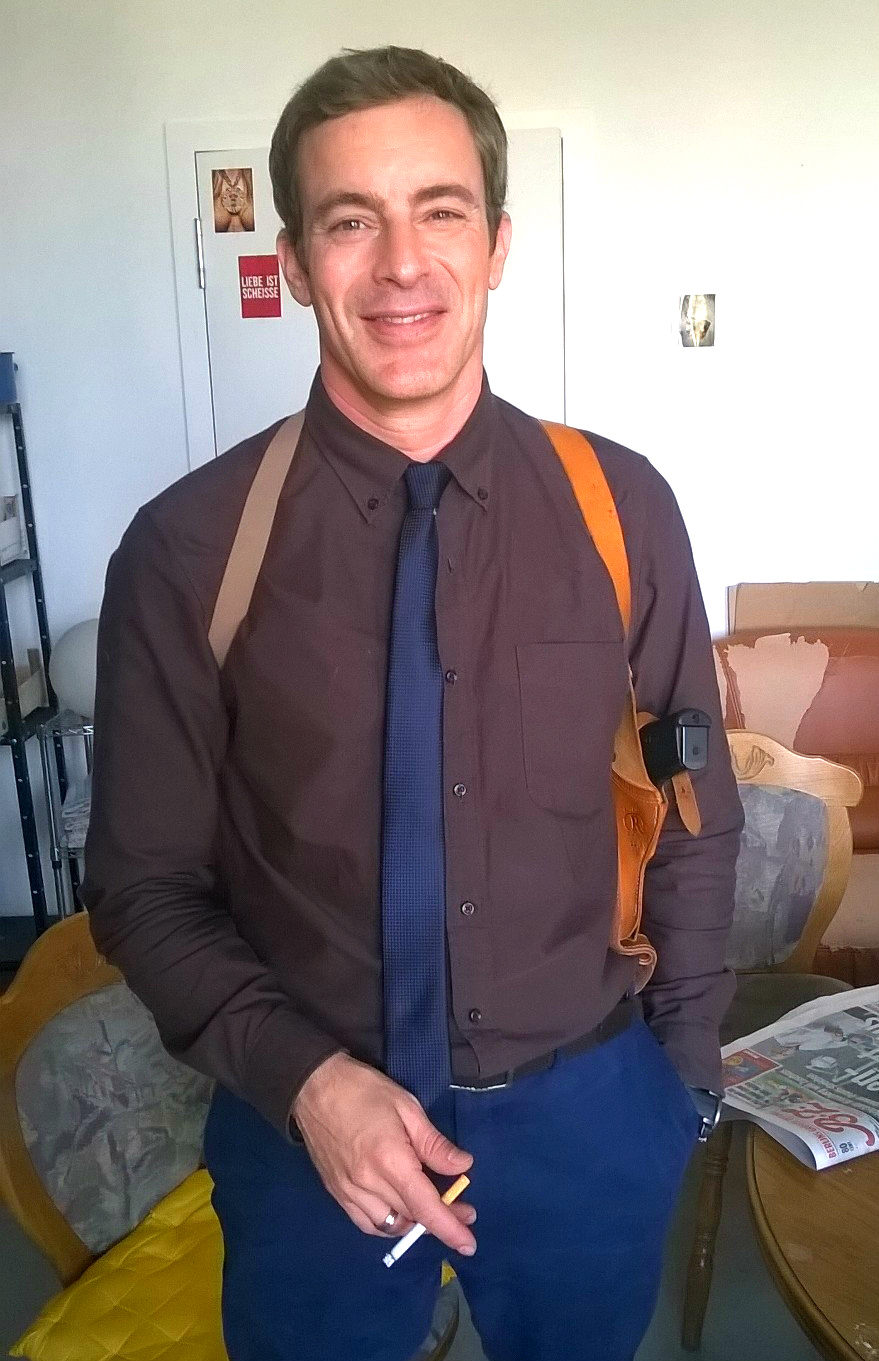
- Burkhard in 2014
- Born: Daniel Gedeon Burkhard; 3 July 1969 (age 57); Munich, West Germany
- Occupation: Actor
- Years active: 1981–present
- Spouse: Birgit Cunningham (divorced)

Daniel Gedeon Burkhard (born 3 July 1969) is a German film and television actor. Although he has appeared in numerous films and TV series in both Europe and the US, he is probably best recognised for his role as Alexander Brandtner in the Austrian/German television series Kommissar Rex (1998–2001), or as Corporal Wilhelm Wicki in the 2009 film Inglourious Basterds. He is also well recognised for his role as Chris Ritter in the long-running series Alarm für Cobra 11.

== Life and career ==
Gedeon Burkhard was born in Munich, West Germany, the son of Wolfgang Burkhard and German actress Elisabeth von Molo (then Burkhard) who is the granddaughter of Alexander Moissi, a famous Albanian-born Austrian actor of the 20th century. Gedeon was educated at a boarding school in England and began his acting career in 1979 in the German TV film Tante Maria.

During the 1990s, he lived in the United States, working in several productions, but without much recognition. Burkhard married Birgit Cunningham, then divorced three months later. After that, he lived in Vienna for Kommissar Rex for more than five years, then moved to Berlin. Burkhard was working in Cologne on the TV series Alarm für Cobra 11 as the detective Chris Ritter until November 2007. His character Chris Ritter had a heroic death. He then returned to Berlin to be close to his daughter and to work on projects. He said "For the moment I will dedicate myself again fully to my artistic vagabond life in Berlin". Burkhard appeared in the Quentin Tarantino movie Inglourious Basterds. In February 2009, he was shooting the film Massel, made for German television. In 2011, he was in Rome, shooting the Italian miniseries Caccia al Re – La narcotici.

In 2011, he competed in Ballando con le Stelle, the Italian version of "Dancing with the Stars", accompanied by professional Italian dancer Samanta Togni, in which he danced with his "daughter" Laura Glavan.

In 2016, Burkhard played Gustav Froehlich, a German actor and UFA star, in the international movie The Devil's Mistress by Czech director Filip Renč. The biographical film is about the life of actress Lída Baarová and her relationship with Joseph Goebbels. The film was released in January 2016 in Prague.

== Selected filmography ==
- Und ab geht die Post (1981, TV movie) (segment "Des isch die Poscht")
- Tante Maria (1981, TV movie) as Andreas Büdenbender
- Blut und Ehre: Jugend unter Hitler (a.k.a. Blood and Honor: Youth Under Hitler (USA)) (1982, TV series) as Hartmut Keller
- Nordlichter: Geschichten zwischen Watt und Wellen (1983, TV series)
- Der Passagier – Welcome to Germany (a.k.a. The Passenger – Welcome to Germany, a.k.a. Welcome to Germany (USA)) (1988) as Janko
- Der Fahnder (1988, TV series) as Hendrik Roloff
- Forsthaus Falkenau (1989, TV series) as Konrad 'Konni' Frank
- Zwei Frauen (a.k.a. Silence Like Glass (USA)) (1989) as Bud
- Sekt oder Selters (1990, TV series)
- Šípková Ruženka (a.k.a. Sleeping Beauty (Europe: English title)) (1990) as Princ Viliam / Johan
- The New Adventures of Black Beauty (1990-1992, TV series) as Manfred
- Náhrdelník (a.k.a. The Necklace (Europe: English title)) (1992, TV series) as Julius
- Kleine Haie (a.k.a. Acting It Out, a.k.a. Little Sharks) (1992) as Ali
- Abgeschminkt! (a.k.a. Making Up! (USA)) (1993) as René
- Mein Mann ist mein Hobby (1993, TV movie) as Franz Ferdinand
- Sommerliebe (1994, TV movie) as Matthias
- Verliebt, verlobt, verheiratet (1994, TV series)
- Affären (1994) as Thomas Prinz
- La piovra - season 7 (1994, TV miniseries) as Daniele Rannisi, the pirate reporter
- Der König (1994, TV series) as Markus Bassermann
- Ein Fall für zwei (1995, TV series) as Michael Marten
- Kommissar Rex (a.k.a. Inspector Rex (Austria), a.k.a. Rex: A Cop's Best Friend (UK)) (1995-2001, TV series) as Alexander Brandtner / Stefan Lanz
- Wem gehört Tobias? (a.k.a. In the Wrong Hands (USA), a.k.a. Mit aller Gewalt – Mein Sohn gehört mir) (1996, TV movie) as Thomas Urban
- SOKO 5113 (1996, TV series) as Philip Steger
- Polizeiruf 110 (1996, TV series) as Louis
- Magenta (1996) as Roy
- 2 Männer, 2 Frauen – 4 Probleme!? (a.k.a. Four for Venice, a.k.a. Two Women, Two Men (USA)) (1998 as Luis
- The Brylcreem Boys (1998) as Krach
- Gefährliche Lust – Ein Mann in Versuchung (a.k.a. Scent of Seduction) (1998, TV movie) as Leon Heflin
- Superfire (2002, TV movie) as Reggie
- Zwei Affären und eine Hochzeit (2002, TV movie) as Jan Richter
- We'll Meet Again (2002, TV movie) as Dr. Peter Gaynes
- Yu (2003) as Tom
- Das bisschen Haushalt (a.k.a. Cleaning Up) (2003, TV movie) as Reinhard Burger
- The Wishing Tree (2004, TV miniseries) as Steve Kammer
- Der Vater meines Sohnes (2004, TV movie) as Ricardo Potero
- Utta Danella – Eine Liebe in Venedig (2005, TV series) as Francesco di Selari
- Der Todestunnel (2005, TV movie) as Andrea Sala
- Leipzig Homicide (2005, TV series) as Ralph Kessler
- Goldene Zeiten (2006) as Mischa Hahn
- Der letzte Zug (2006) as Henry Neumann
- Alarm für Cobra 11 (2007-2008, TV series) as Chris Ritter / Mark Jäger
- Melodies of Spring (2007) as Florian (lead)
- Inglourious Basterds (2009, USA movie) as Cpl. Wilhelm Wicki
- Oh, What a Mess (2009, TV movie) as Patrick Silberschatz
- La Narcotici (2009, TV series) as Chief Daniele Piazza (lead)
- Inga Lindström – Millionäre küsst man nicht (2010-2013, TV series) as Jasper Svensson / Tomas Lindberg
- Wunderkinder (2011, German movie) as Boris Brodsky (lead)
- Bridges (2011, German animated short film-noir) as Captain Saul Bridges (lead)
- Ludwig II (2012) as Graf Maximilian von Holnstein
- Kokowääh 2 (2013) as Luc
- Ohne Gnade (2013, German movie) as Ronzo
- Tränen der Sextner Dolomiten (2014) as Pfarrer Oberrainer
- Unknown Heart (2014) as Andrew Shaw
- Gefällt mir (2014) as Peter Jungbluth
- Shades of Truth (2015, by Liana Marabini (Condor Pictures), as Father Roberto
- The Devil's Mistress (2016, Czech film) as Gustav Fröhlich
- The Key (2016) as Tim
- Plan B (2016) as Schulz
- Titanium White (2016) as Agent Buckley
- Schneeflöckchen (2017) as Winter
- Rhein-Lahn Krimi: Jammertal (2017) as Peter Löber
- Ronny & Klaid (2018) as Bouncer
- Sauerkrautkoma (2018) as Karl-Heinz Fleischmann
