= Denise Zich =

German actress and singer (born 1975)

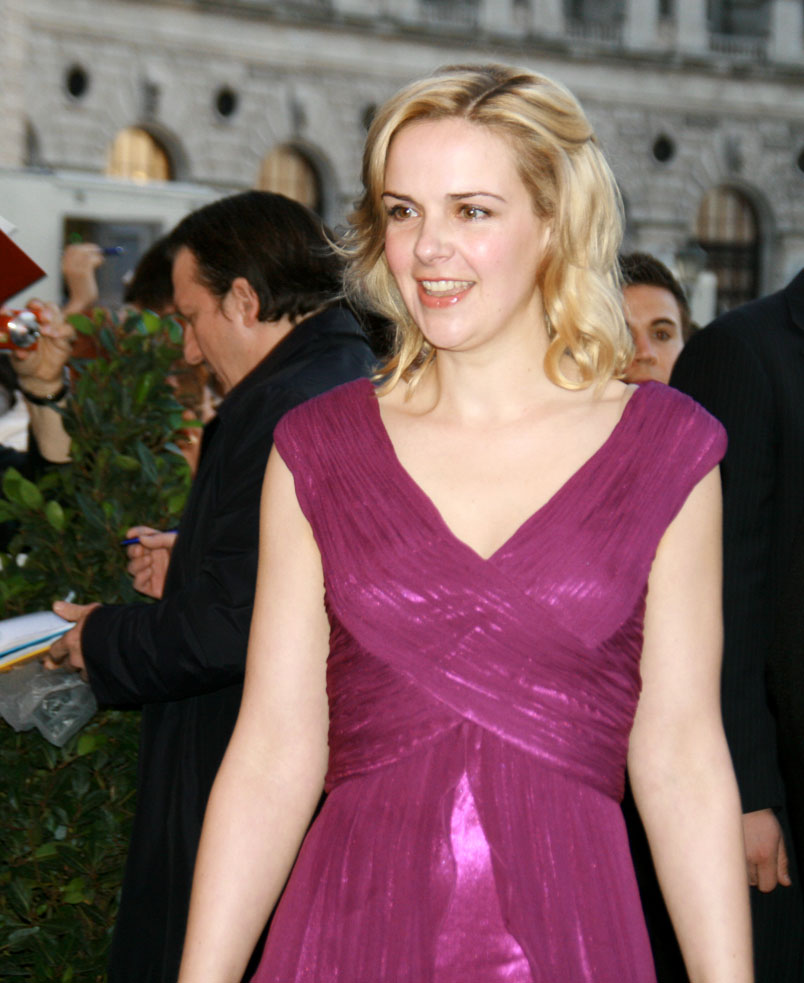
Denise Zich (2010)

Denise Zich (born 7 December 1975 in Wolfen, East Germany) is a German actress and former singer.

== Life ==
Denise Zich grew up in Berlin. At the beginning of her career, she modeled for Calvin Klein and got her first chance as an actress in the RTL soap Gute Zeiten, schlechte Zeiten, in which she had a supporting role for several months in 1995 together with her bandmates from Just Friends. She left the band in 1996.

In 1996, she hosted the show Pumuckl TV with Benedikt Weber.

After further television roles, she played in her first film Schlaraffenland in 1999 alongside Heiner Lauterbach, Franka Potente and Jürgen Tarrach. She received good reviews for her portrayal of the young fashion designer Valerie Landau in the German-Austrian television miniseries Love, Lies, Passions, where she played alongside Maximilian Schell and Barbara Sukowa.

In 2001, Denise Zich received the Austrian television award Romy in the category Most Popular Female Shooting Star. In 2007, she appeared in the film Schwere Jungs by Marcus H. Rosenmüller. In 2010, she was a permanent member of the ensemble of the series In aller Freundschaft in her role as Dr. Isabel Dahl.

Zich lives near Berlin and has been married to her acting colleague Andreas Elsholz since 2001. They are parents of a son.
