= Open circuit =

Open circuit may refer to:

- Open circuit breathing apparatus, any type of breathing apparatus where the exhaled gas is discharged to the surroundings without recycling any of it
  - Open-circuit scuba, a type of Scuba-diving equipment where the user breathes from the set and then exhales to the surroundings without recycling the exhaled breathing gas
  - Open circuit surface-supplied diving equipment, a type of surface-supplied diving equipment where the user breathes from the supplied gas and exhales to the surroundings without recycling the exhaled gas
- Open-circuit test, a method used in electrical engineering to determine the impedance in the excitation branch of a real transformer
- Open-circuit voltage, the difference of electrical potential between two terminals of a device when there is no external load connected
- An open electrical circuit is an electrical network that lacks a complete path between the terminals of its power source

== See also ==
- Closed-circuit (disambiguation)
- Short circuit (disambiguation)
- Open system (disambiguation)
