= Komm, süßer Tod =

Komm, süßer Tod is German for Come, Sweet Death and may refer to:

- Come, Sweet Death (novel) (German: Komm, süßer Tod), a 1998 novel by Wolf Haas
  - Come, Sweet Death (film), a 2000 Austrian film based on the novel
- "Komm, süßer Tod, komm selge Ruh", a piece by Johann Sebastian Bach
- "Komm, süsser Tod" (Arianne song), from the soundtrack of the film The End of Evangelion
- "Komm süßer Tod", a song by Eisbrecher from their album Sünde
