= Wolf Haas =

Austrian writer (born 1960)

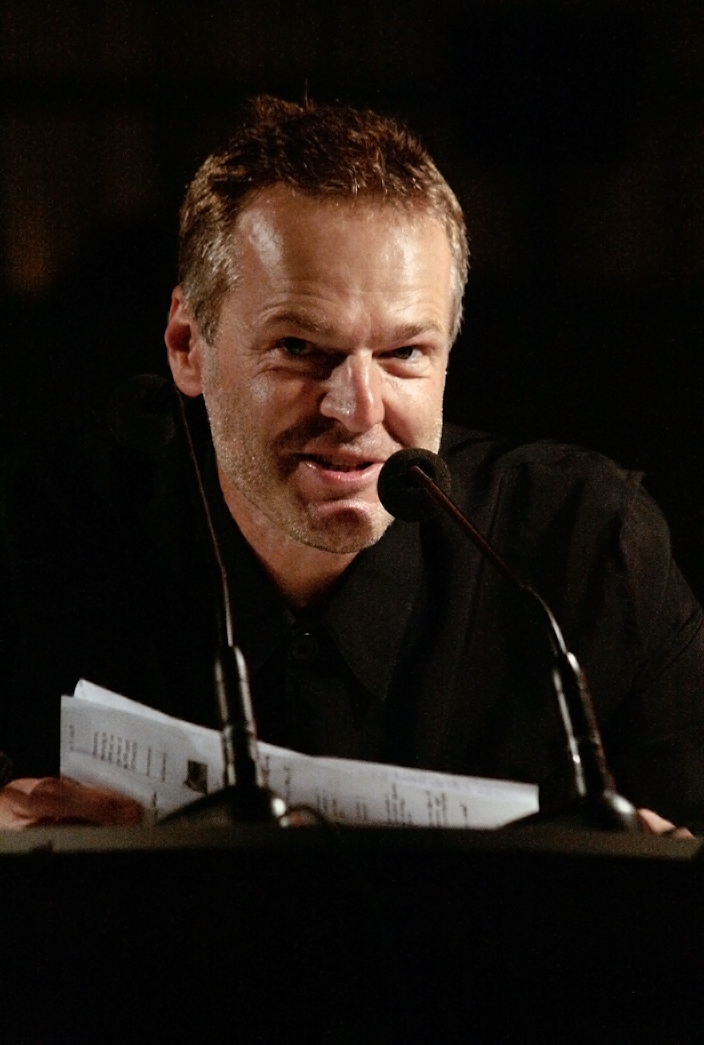
Wolf Haas reading at the literary festival o-töne, 2009.

Wolf Haas (born 14 December 1960) is an Austrian writer. He is most widely known for his crime fiction novels featuring detective Simon Brenner, four of which were made into films. He has won several prizes for his works, including the German prize for crime fiction (Deutscher Krimipreis).

== Life ==
Wolf Haas was born in 1960 in Maria Alm am Steinernen Meer, which is part of the Austrian state of Salzburg. After university he worked as an advertising copywriter. Between 1996 and 2003 he wrote seven detective stories, of which six featured detective Simon Brenner. Four were made into films: Komm, süßer Tod (Come Sweet Death), Silentium, Der Knochenmann (The Boneman) and Das ewige Leben (Life Eternal). He has won several prizes for his works, including placed in the German prize for crime fiction (Deutscher Krimi Preis) three times (1997, 1999, 2000), including one first place, and the Literaturpreis der Stadt Bremen 2013.

== Works ==
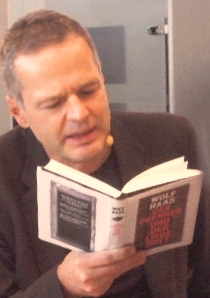
Wolf Haas reading at the Frankfurt Book Fair in 2009

=== Detective novels ===
- Simon Brenner detective stories (and where they are set):
  - Auferstehung der Toten (Zell am See), Rowohlt, Reinbek 1996, ISBN 3-499-22831-9 (Translated by Annie Janusch as Resurrection, Melville House, 2014, ISBN 978-1-61219-271-0)
  - Der Knochenmann (Klöch in Styria), Rowohlt, Reinbek 1997, ISBN 3-499-22832-7 (Translated by Annie Janusch as The Bone Man, Melville House, 2013, ISBN 978-1-61219-169-0)
  - Komm, süßer Tod (Vienna), Rowohlt, Reinbek 1998, ISBN 3-499-22814-9 (Translated by Annie Janusch as Come, Sweet Death!, Melville House, 2014, ISBN 978-1-61219-339-7)
  - Silentium! (Salzburg), Rowohlt, Reinbek 1999, ISBN 3-499-22830-0
  - Wie die Tiere (Vienna), Rowohlt, Reinbek 2001, ISBN 3-499-23331-2
  - Das ewige Leben (Graz), Hoffmann und Campe, Hamburg 2003, ISBN 3-492-24095-X
  - Der Brenner und der liebe Gott, Hoffmann und Campe, Hamburg 2009, ISBN 978-3-455-40189-9 (Translated by Annie Janusch as Brenner and God, Melville House, 2012, ISBN 978-1-61219-113-3)
  - Brennerova, Hoffmann und Campe, Hamburg 2014, ISBN 978-3-455-40499-9
  - Müll, Hoffmann und Campe, Hamburg 2022, ISBN 978-3-455-01430-3

=== Other novels ===
- Ausgebremst – Der Roman zur Formel 1, Rowohlt, Reinbek 1998, ISBN 3-499-22868-8
- Das Wetter vor 15 Jahren, 2006, Hoffmann und Campe, Hamburg 2006, ISBN 3-455-40004-3, translated by Stephanie Gilardi and Thomas S. Hansen as The Weather Fifteen Years Ago, Ariadne Press, Riverside California 2009, ISBN 978-1-57241-166-1
- Verteidigung der Missionarsstellung. Hoffmann und Campe, Hamburg 2012, ISBN 978-3-455-40418-0
- Junger Mann. Hoffmann und Campe, Hamburg 2018, ISBN 978-3-455-00388-8
- Eigentum. Hanser, München 2023, ISBN 978-3-446-27833-2
- Wackelkontakt. Hanser, Berlin 2025, ISBN 978-3-446-28272-8, translated by Jamie Bulloch as Short Circuit, HarperVia, 2026.

=== Non-fiction ===
- Sprachtheoretische Grundlagen der Konkreten Poesie. Akademischer Verlag Heinz, Stuttgart 1990 ISBN 3-88099-237-1
- Die Liebe in den Zeiten des Cola-Rauschs, Verlag Tauschzentrale, Wien 1993, ISBN 3-901352-01-5

=== Children's books ===
- Die Gans im Gegenteil. Hoffmann und Campe, Hamburg 2010 ISBN 3-455-40286-0

== See also ==
- List of Austrian writers
- List of Austrians
