= Raw material (disambiguation) =

A raw material is the basic material from which goods, finished products or intermediate materials are manufactured or made.

Raw material may also refer to:

- Raw Material (album), 2000 Mars Ill album
- Raw Material (novel), 1984 novel by Jörg Fauser
- Raw Materials, 2006 Vijay Iyer album
