= Karl Svoboda =

Karl Svoboda may refer to:

- Karl Svoboda (rugby union)
- Karl Svoboda (politician)
