= Sofa Surfers (band) =

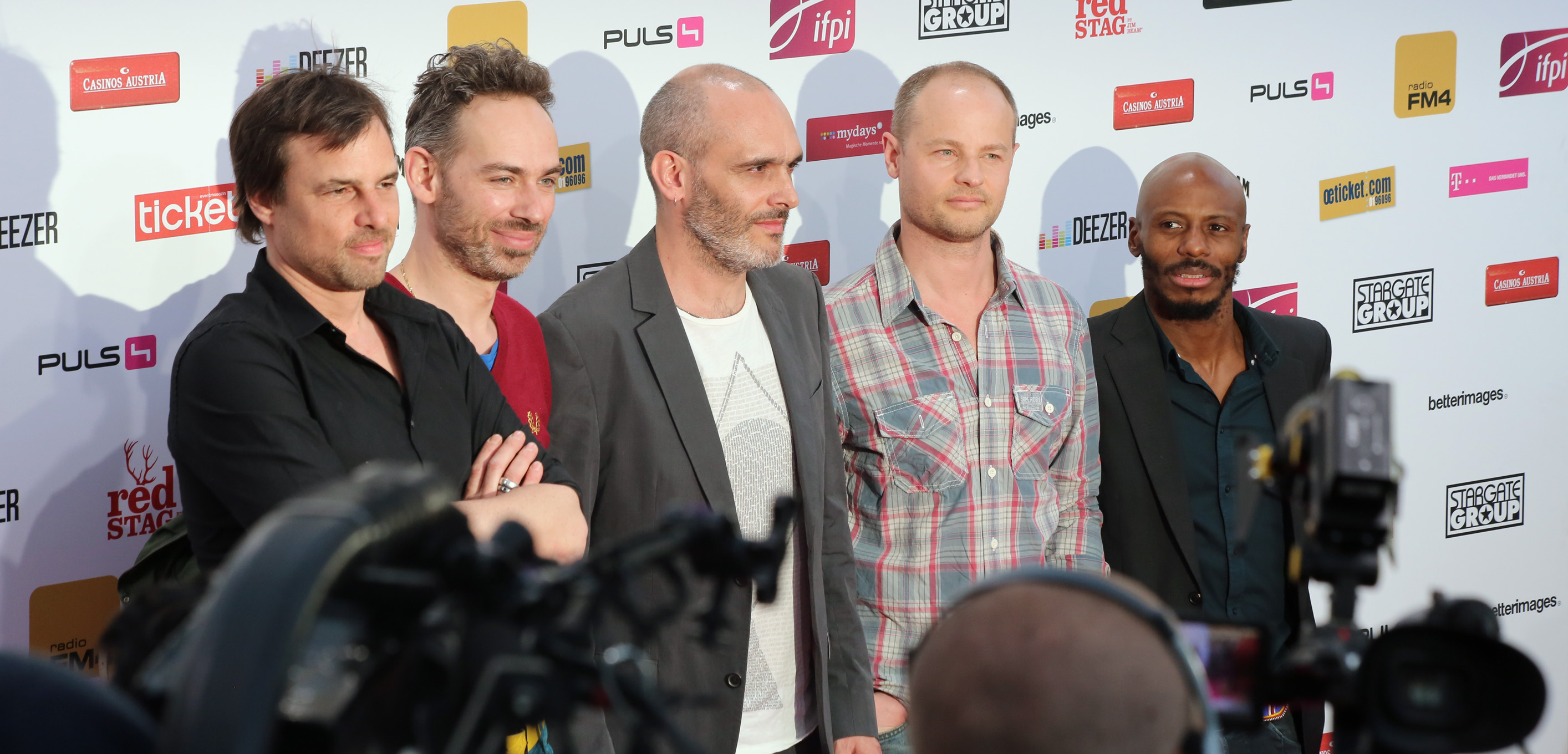
The Sofa Surfers at the 2013 Amadeus Austrian Music Award at the Volkstheater in Vienna.

Sofa Surfers is an Austrian band that plays a mixture of rock and electronic music floating between trip hop, dub and acid jazz. They have also composed film scores.

== Members ==
- Markus Kienzl
- Wolfgang Frisch
- Michael Holzgruber
- Mani Obeya

Several guests cooperated on the album Encounters - for example Sensational, Oddateee, Jeb Loy Nichols, DJ Collage, Lil Desmond Levy, Junior Delgado, Dawna Lee, Mark Stewart and MC Santana. On the album called Sofa Surfers sings Mani Obeya.

== Discography ==
- 1997 Transit
- 1999 Cargo
- 2000 Constructions: Remixed & Dubbed
- 2002 Encounters
- 2004 See the Light
- 2005 Sofa Surfers
- 2010 Blindside
- 2012 Superluminal
- 2015 Scrambles, Anthems and Odysseys
- 2017 20

=== Soundtracks ===
- 2000 Komm, süßer Tod
- 2004 Silentium
- 2009 Der Knochenmann
- 2014 Das ewige Leben
- 2015 Focus
