= Daniel Glattauer =

Austrian writer and former journalist

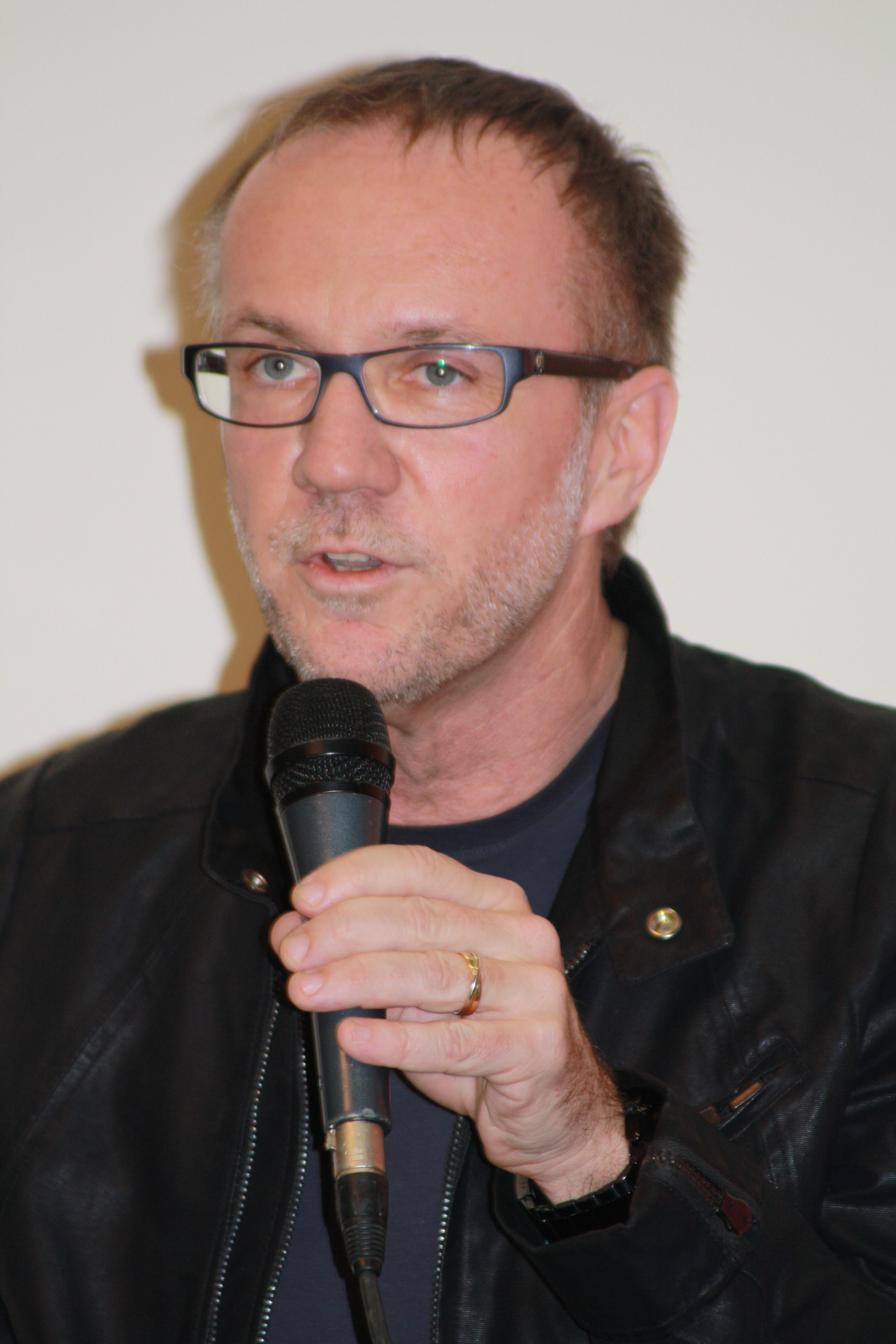
Daniel Glattauer at the 'Leipzig Book Fair' in 2009.

Daniel Glattauer (born 19 May 1960) is an Austrian writer and former journalist. He was born in Vienna, where he still lives and works. A former regular columnist for Der Standard, a national daily newspaper, he is best known for his dialogic epistolary novel Gut gegen Nordwind and its sequel Every Seventh Wave (Alle sieben Wellen).

His literary works were translated into 40 languages, sold over 3 million times and adapted for radio, theater, television and cinema alike, even beyond the German speaking countries. In 2006 he was nominated for the German Book Prize (Deutscher Buchpreis) for his novel Gut gegen Nordwind. This was later translated into English by Jamie Bulloch and Katharina Bielenberg, and published by MacLehose Press in 2011 as Love Virtually.

Glattauer's novels and plays are inspired by his personal experiences, dealing with situations and themes constructed from memories of his time as a journalist and his psychosocial counsellor training.

With him often being described as a "feel-good-author", Glattauer's work is characterized by humor and romantic relationships, catering to the masses and leading some critics to find fault with a lack of depth to his novels.

== Biography ==
=== Early life, education and family ===
Glattauer was born in Vienna on 19 May 1960 and was raised in Favoriten, the city's 10th district, where he also went to school at Neulandschule Laaerberg. In high school, at the age of 16, he started writing his first love poems and short stories that remain unpublished. For private use only he also wrote songs for the guitar.

After graduating in 1978, he went on to study pedagogy and art history at the University of Vienna in 1979, where he also did his doctorate in 1985, writing his dissertation about "the evil in the upbringing". The same year, at the age of 25, he met Lisi, whom he married 20 years later. She brought her 5-year-old son, Thomas, into the relationship and they raised him together.

Glattauer is not the only journalist and author in his family. Herbert O. Glattauer, his father, is a retired journalist and freelance writer, having published multiple books. He also wrote around 40 short stories under the pseudonym 'Oscar Hannibal Pippering', starring a private detective of the same name. Daniel Glattauer's elder brother, Nikolaus (1959–2025), was a journalist, author and teacher in Vienna, having published books with a humorous take on education. Since the birth of Theo, Glattauer's nephew, Daniel documented his upbringing and maturing in short texts and interviews and further made him the topic of two books, "Theo und der Rest der Welt" (1997) and "Theo. Antworten aus dem Kinderzimmer" (2010).

From 2010 to 2012 he did a five-semester-long diploma course at "ARGE Bildungsmanagement" to be a psychosocial counsellor.

== Career ==
Following the completion of his studies, Glattauer worked as an editor for Die Presse, a national, daily newspaper, for about three years, before becoming a journalist for Der Standard, a few months after it was founded. There, he operated as court reporter and journalist as well as columnist, writing his columns about daily life under the acronym 'dag.'

In 1998 he published "Bekennen Sie sich schuldig?", a collection of satirical texts from his time as a court reporter. This was followed by the anthologies of selected columns, "Ameisenerzählung" in 2001, "Schauma mal" in 2009 and "Mama, jetzt nicht!" in 2011.

After his first novels "Der Weihnachtshund" and "Darum" were successful in the German-speaking area, Glattauer's real breakthrough as a novelist happened in 2006, with Love Virtually. Since 2009 he is a freelance author, residing in Vienna and the Waldviertel, the northwestern region of Lower Austria with his wife Lisi Glattauer and five Indian runner ducks. In 2010 he was part of the jury of the short-story competition "Wortlaut" by the Austrian radio station FM4.

Recently Daniel Glattauer and his wife, with the help of the winemaker Barbara Öhlzeit, started tending to and producing their own wine. The 2015 vintage is named after his most successful novel, "Gut gegen Nordwind - Glattauers Gemischte Sätze", and the 2016 batch is currently maturing.

== Style ==
Glattauer's "elegant" and "light" style that characterizes most of his humorous prose are ascribed to the years of journalistic experience he gathered during his time as columnist at Der Standard. In an interview with the journalist Birgit Braunrath, Glattauer himself claims that his goal is first and foremost to "get across in the most authentic way possible" ("möglichst authentisch rüberkommen.")

=== Inspiration and themes ===
Glattauer's first play "Die Wunderübung" was inspired directly by the psychosocial counselling course he attended in 2010. It is a minimalistic play with three characters, a constantly fighting married couple and their couples therapist who resorts to unconventional methods to fix their relationship.

Glattauer claims that "one always draws inspiration from experience" ("Man schöpft immer aus dem Erlebten") and that he writes about what he knows. In an interview with the Austrian journalist Thomas Trenkler, he reveals that some of his works, such as the psychothriller Forever Yours ("Ewig dein") published in 2012, were inspired by his time as a court reporter, relying on trial proceedings of stalking cases he witnessed at the time.

Even as a retired journalist he finds inspiration in newspapers. He stumbled across the idea for his novel "Geschenkt", two years prior to its publication in 2014, in a newspaper article reporting on an anonymous donation made for people in need in Braunschweig, Germany. This story itself was highly publicized at the time and referred to as "the miracle of Braunschweig" ("das Wunder von Braunschweig.")

== Public reception ==
=== Public image ===
In a review published in Die Presse, Anna-Maria Wallner admits that Glattauer writes "amusing dialogues" ("amüsante Dialoge") but simultaneously critiques him for having a too intense focus on romantic relationships in most of his novels. Consistent with Wallner's review, the phrase "feel-good-author" is used in various reviews and interviews, implying a lack of depth to his work. When confronted with this label, the author takes it lightly, responding that "rubbing people the wrong way is not his specialty" ("Anecken ist nicht meine Disziplin.")

=== Reception ===
At first Glattauer's reputation as a journalist hindered his success as an author in his home country. Austrian literary critics would think of him as a journalist whose hobby was writing books in his free time. As a result, there is a lack of domestic, analytical, literary reviews of his work, which offers and explanation for his relatively moderate success in Austria compared to Germany, where his works are strongly promoted. The German, self-employed bookseller Martin Gaiser states in a review of Love Virtually that Glattauer uses "trenchant and challenging" ("pointiert und anspruchsvoll") language, naming it as one of the reasons for the novel's success. Taking the roundabout way through Austria's neighboring country, the national reception of Glattauer's work, although delayed, was overall very good. The author himself believes that the reception in various countries most likely depends on the quality of the translation, stating that the Spanish version must be quite good with regard to the sales numbers in Spain.

=== Readership demographic ===
In an Interview with the journalist Herbert Lackner, Glattauer reveals that he always writes with an intended audience at the back of his mind. For instance, he imagined the readers of his novel "Darum" to be female, between the ages 30 and 40.

=== Adaptations of his work ===
==== Theater ====
On 7 May 2009 the theater adaptation of Love Virtually premiered at the "Theater in der Josefstadt". While Glattauer co-wrote the adaptation, the stage production was directed by Michael Kreihsl, starring Ruth Brauer-Kvam and Alexander Pschill in the lead roles. In the theater season of 2010/11 the adaptation had, tremendous success in the German-speaking countries, its 374 performances only being topped by Friedrich Dürrenmatt's The Visit.

Glattauer's play "Die Wunderübung" premiered on 22 January 2015, shortly after he wrote it in 2014.

==== Film ====
Glattauer's novel "Der Weihnachtshund" was adapted for television in 2004. The movie, by the same name, was directed by the German producer Michael Keusch, starring Nadeshda Brennicke and Florian Fitz in the lead roles of Katrin and Max. Three years later, the Austrian screenwriter and director Harald Sicheritz produced Glattauer's "Darum" for the cinema. Neither the movie "Der Weihnachtshund" nor "Darum" were as successful as the theater versions of Glattauer's other novels.

In 2010, the theater adaptation of Love Virtually premiered on national television.

==== Radio ====
Love Virtually was adapted for BBC Radio 4 by Eileen Horne. Produced by Clive Brill for Pacificus Productions, the abridged play starred Emilia Fox and David Tennant in the lead roles of Emmi Rothner and Leo Leike. The program was first broadcast at 2:15 p.m. on 8 March 2012 and ran for a week. Describing the play as "sharply written, funny and brilliantly played", Elisabeth Mahoney's review in the Guardian is representative of the show's overall positive public reception.

Following the success of Love Virtually, on 14 February 2013, the adaptation of Every Seventh Wave was aired on BBC Radio 4 with Fox and Tennant voicing the protagonists once more.

=== Awards and nominations ===
- 2006 Nomination for the German Book Prize for Love Virtually
- 2007 Love Virtually wins the Austrian literary award "Buchliebling" in the category "Literatur, Romane, Belletristik" ["literature, novels, fiction"]

== Bibliography ==
- Das Problem des Bösen und seine pädagogische Bedeutung. PhD diss., University of Vienna, 1984.
- Theo und der Rest der Welt. Vienna: Döcker 1997.
- Bekennen Sie sich schuldig? Geschichten aus dem Grauen Haus. Vienna: Döcker 1998.
- Der Weihnachtshund. Vienna: Deuticke 2000.
- Die Ameisenzählung. Vienna: Deuticke 2001.
- Darum. Vienna: Deuticke 2003.
- Die Vögel brüllen. Kommentare zum Alltag. Vienna: Deuticke 2004.
- Gut gegen Nordwind. [Love Virtually] Vienna: Deuticke 2006.
- Rainer Maria sucht das Paradies. Vienna: Deuticke 2008.
- Typologie der Vanillekipferl-Esser. Vienna: Deuticke, 2009.
- Alle sieben Wellen. [Every Seventh Wave] Vienna: Deuticke 2009.
- Schauma mal. Kolumnen aus dem Alltag. Vienna: Deuticke 2009.
- Der Karpfenstreit. Die schönsten Weihnachtskrisen. Munich: Sanssouci 2010.
- Theo. Antworten aus dem Kinderzimmer. Vienna: Deuticke 2010.
- Mama, jetzt nicht! Kolumnen aus dem Alltag. Vienna: Deuticke 2011.
- Ewig Dein. [Forever Yours] Vienna: Deuticke 2012.
- Geschenkt. Vienna: Deuticke 2014.
- Die Wunderübung. Eine Komödie. Vienna: Deuticke 2014.
- Vier Stern Stunden. Vienna: Deuticke 2018.
- Die Liebe Geld. Eine Komödie. Vienna: Paul-Zsolnay, 2020.
- Die spürst du nicht. Vienna: Paul-Zsolnay, 2023.
- In einem Zug. Vienna: Dumont Buchverlag, 2025.
