= The Buried City =

2023 book by Gabriel Zuchtriegel

- Author: Gabriel Zuchtriegel
- Original title: Vom Zauber des Untergangs
- Translator: Jamie Bulloch
- Language: German
- Subject: Pompeii
- Publisher: Propyläen Verlag
- Publication date: 27 April 2023
- Publication place: Germany
- English publication date: May 2025
- Pages: 240
- ISBN: 9783549100486

The Buried City: Unearthing the Real Pompeii (German: Vom Zauber des Untergangs. Was Pompeji über uns erzählt, lit. 'From the Enchantment of Doom: What Pompeii Tells about Us') is a 2023 book by the German archaeologist Gabriel Zuchtriegel.

== Background ==
The German archaeologist Gabriel Zuchtriegel became the first non-Italian director of the Pompeii Archaeological Park in 2021, which sparked controversy due to his nationality, young age and desire for more popular interaction with the site.

== Summary ==
The book is about the ancient city of Pompeii in Italy and recent excavations at the site. It covers discoveries and ongoing work with preservation, as well as Zuchtriegel's subjective reflections, influences and approach to classical archaeology. There are chapters about classical education and the House of the Vettii, the Villa of the Mysteries and ancient religion, the villa of Civita Giuliana, the grave of the wealthy former slave Marcus Venerius Secundio, and the aftermath of Pompeii's destruction from the eruption of Mount Vesuvius in 79 AD.

== Reception ==
Guy D. Middleton wrote in the American Journal of Archaeology that the book "is very much like a good conversation with a learned friend" and "highly readable and refreshing".
