= The Space Between the Lines =

2019 German romantic drama film

- Theatrical release poster
- Directed by: Vanessa Jopp
- Written by: Jane Ainscough
- Based on: Love Virtually by Daniel Glattauer
- Produced by: Janine Jackowski; Jonas Dornbach
- Starring: Alexander Fehling; Nora Tschirner
- Cinematography: Sten Mende
- Edited by: Andrew Bird
- Music by: Volker Bertelmann
- Production companies: Deutsche Columbia Pictures Filmproduktion; Komplizen Film; Erfttal Film
- Distributed by: Sony Pictures Releasing GmbH
- Release date: 12 September 2019
- Running time: 123 minutes
- Country: Germany
- Language: German
- Box office: $4.8 million

The Space Between the Lines (German: Gut gegen Nordwind) is a 2019 German romantic drama film directed by Vanessa Jopp, based on the 2006 novel Gut gegen Nordwind by Daniel Glattauer. The film stars Alexander Fehling and Nora Tschirner in the lead roles.

The film premiered on 3 September 2019 in Cologne and was released on 12 September 2019 by the German division of Sony Pictures Releasing.

With several adaptions, David Tennant played the male lead in a radio play.

== Plot ==
Emma Rothner wants to cancel her subscription to Like magazine, but a typographical error in the e-mail address meant the e-mail went to linguist Leo Leike. After initial diatribes, the two start to correspond with eloquent statements. At the time Leike was in an on-off relationship with Marlene Korlinski. Rothner claimed to be in a happy marriage to the much-older conductor Bernhard Rothner.

The two correspondents assured each other they would not web-search each other, and maintain an illusory dream each of each other; for her, an escape from daily family life, and for him, escaping the pain of his relationship. Receiving "Emmi"'s Christmas greetings, the Leike's relationship with Korlinski faltered again. Leike and Rothner's communications became increasingly intimate and their trust and openness grew.

During this time they pass each other without aware of the other. A planned meeting at Café Huber was to see if one would recognise the other amongst all the cafe patrons, without revealing each other. Both attended, sat, and observed, before leaving. Both persons were now falling in love with the other, without having actually met in person. Rothner became more distant with her husband, while stating she could sleep much better thinking of Leike's words.

Rothner's husband read some of the e-mail exchange, and urged Leike to meet with "Emmi" and even to sleep with her. This would allow Bernhard to compete with a real person, not an image. Emmi was unaware of this exchange, and Leike did not mention it to her either. He created a little more distance, before saying he was taking up a university position in Boston, and saying he wanted to meet a woman "in the normal way". Leike did however ask to meet Emmi once more, with some erotic fantasies including a kiss in the dark before seeing the real face.

Rothner left for the meeting, with her husband saying "Amuse yourself well, Emmi", where he normally would have called her "Emma". She did not meet Leike, but later writes him an e-mail, which resulted in a bounce e-mail indicating the e-address no longer exists. Before Leike gets into a taxi for the airport, Emmi arrives, leaving an open end suggesting a possible happy ending to the virtual romance.

== Cast ==
- Alexander Fehling as Leo Leike
- Nora Tschirner as Emma Rothner
- Ulrich Thomsen as Bernhard Rothner, husband of Emma
- Ella Rumpf as Adrienne Leike, sister of Leo
- Claudia Eisinger as Marlene Korlinski, in a relationship with Leo
- Lisa Tomaschewsky as Clara Rothner
- Eleonore Weisgerber as Vera
- Gina Henkel as Simone
- Piet Fuchs as Dr Koch
- Katharina Gieron as Fiona
- Moritz Führmann as Paul
