= Short circuit (disambiguation) =

A short circuit is an electrical circuit that allows a current to travel along an unintended path with no or a very low electrical impedance.

Short Circuit may also refer to:

== Film ==
- Short Circuit (1943 film), an Italian film
- Short Circuit (1986 film), an American science fiction comedy film about a robot that comes to life
  - Short Circuit 2, the 1988 sequel
- Short Circuits (film), a 2006 Slovene film
- Short Circuit (2019 film), Gujarati science fiction comedy-drama film
- Short Circuit (short series), a Walt Disney Animation Studios experimental short series

== Literature ==
- Short Circuit (Wedgelock novel), a 1986 novel by Colin Wedgelock, a pen name for Christopher Priest
- Short Circuit (Haas novel), a 2025 novel by Wolf Haas

== Music ==
- Short Circuit: Live at the Electric Circus, a 1978 compilation album of English punk and reggae
- Short Circuit (I've Sound album), 2003, or the title song
  - Short Circuit II (album), a 2007 album by I've Sound
  - Short Circuit III, a 2010 album by I've Sound
- Short Circuit: Original Motion Picture Soundtrack, soundtrack album for the eponymous 1986 film
- "Short Circuit", a song by Daft Punk from their 2001 album Discovery

== Other uses ==
- Short Circuit (video game), based on the 1986 film
- ShortCircuit, a YouTube channel owned by Linus Media Group

== See also ==
- Short Circutz, a series of animated web short films
- Nick Cannon Presents: Short Circuitz, MTV sketch comedy TV show
- Short-circuit evaluation, a form of Boolean evaluation in programming
- Short-circuit test
- Short (disambiguation)
- Circuit (disambiguation)
- Open circuit (disambiguation)
