= Jörg Fauser =

German writer, poet and journalist

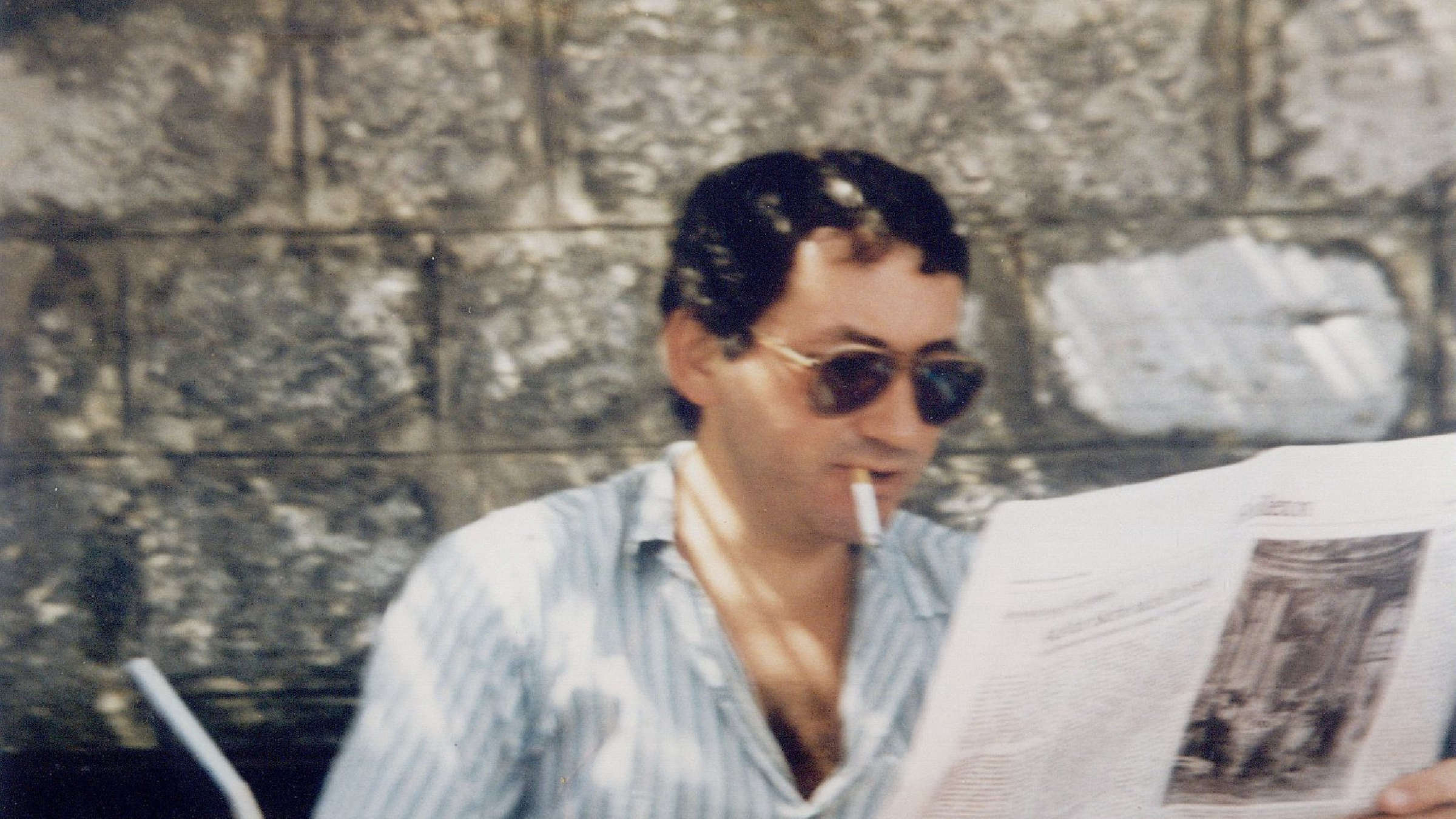
- Jörg Fauser in 1986
- Born: 16 July 1944 Bad Schwalbach
- Died: 17 July 1987 (aged 43) Munich
- Occupation: writer, poet, journalist

Jörg Fauser (16 July 1944 – 17 July 1987) was a German writer, poet and journalist.

The influence of the American Beat Generation literature on his works is well known. Together with Carl Weissner and other colleagues he published several issues of the literature magazine Gasolin 23 which included work by William S. Burroughs, Allen Ginsberg and the first German translations of short stories by Charles Bukowski. His later works are mostly German detective stories. Der Schneemann has been made into a movie. He died when a truck hit him while walking on a motorway near Munich. Fauser's autobiographical novel, Rohstoff, a cutting look at the German counter-culture scene of the late 1960s and early 1970s, has been translated into English by Jamie Bulloch as Raw Material and published by Clerkenwell Press. His radio play Für eine Mark und Acht was adapted into the 1998 film Frankfurt Millennium.

== Works ==
- Aqualunge, Göttingen 1971
- Tophane, Gersthofen 1972
- Die Harry-Gelb-Story, Gersthofen 1973
- Open end, München 1977
- Marlon Brando – der versilberte Rebell, München 1978
- Der Strand der Städte, Berlin 1978
- Alles wird gut, München 1979
- Requiem für einen Goldfisch, Basel 1979
- Trotzki, Goethe und das Glück, München 1979
- Der Schneemann, München 1981
- Mann und Maus, München 1982
- Blues für Blondinen, Frankfurt/M. 1984
- Rohstoff, Frankfur/M. 1984
- Das Schlangenmaul, Frankfurt/M. 1985
- Kant, München 1987
- Jörg-Fauser-Edition, Hamburg
  - Bd. 1. Romane I, 1990
  - Bd. 2. Romane II, 1990
  - Bd. 3. Erzählungen I, 1990
  - Bd. 4. Erzählungen II, 1990
  - Bd. 5. Gedichte, 1990
  - Bd. 6. Essays, Reportagen, Kolumnen I, 1990
  - Bd. 7. Essays, Reportagen, Kolumnen II, 1990
  - Bd. 8. Marlon-Brando-Biographie, 1990
  - Beiheft. Informationen und Bilder, 1990
  - Erg.-Bd. Das leise lächelnde Nein und andere Texte, 1994
- Blues in Blond, Hamburg 1992
- "Ich habe eine Mordswut", Frankfurt/M. 1993
- Lese-Stoff, Frankfurt/M. 2003
