= The Snowman (Fauser novel) =

1981 novel by Jörg Fauser

- Author: Jörg Fauser
- Original title: Der Schneemann
- Translator: Anthea Bell
- Language: German
- Publisher: Rogner & Bernhard
- Publication date: 1981
- Publication place: West Germany
- English publication date: 1 September 2004
- Pages: 241
- ISBN: 3807701605

The Snowman (German: Der Schneemann) is a 1981 novel by the German writer Jörg Fauser. It is about the small-time criminal Blum who unexpectedly comes over a large batch of cocaine and tries to sell it while avoiding its owners, visiting locations in Malta, Munich, Frankfurt, Wesel, Amsterdam and Ostend.

The writing was inspired by American crime fiction. The novel, along with Das Schlangenmaul (1985), stands out in Fauser's bibliography by being crime fiction and was commercially successful on a level he had not experienced before.

The book was published in English translation by Anthea Bell in 2004. A German edition with original illustrations by Jim Avignon was published in 2024 to celebrate Fauser's 80th birthday.

The novel was adapted into the 1985 film The Snowman, directed by Peter F. Bringmann and starring Marius Müller-Westernhagen.
