= Linda Stift =

Austrian writer (born 1969)

Linda Stift (born 1969) is an Austrian writer. She was born in Wagna and studied German literature at the University of Vienna. She has published three novels to date: Kingpeng (2005), Stierhunger (2007) and Kein einziger Tag (2011).

She won the Alfred Gesswein Literaturpreis in 2007. She was also nominated for the prestigious Ingeborg Bachmann Prize in 2009. Stierhunger was published in English as The Empress and the Cake by Peirene Press in 2016 in a translation by Jamie Bulloch.
