= Favoriten =

Coordinates: 48°09′28″N 16°21′33″E

Favoriten Favoritn (Bavarian)
- 10th District of Vienna
- Coat of arms

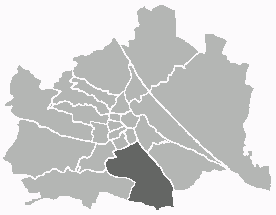
- Location of the district within Vienna
- Country: Austria
- City: Vienna

Government
  - District Director: Marcus Franz (SPÖ)
  - First Deputy: Josef Kaindl (SPÖ)
  - Second Deputy: Michael Mrkvicka (FPÖ)
  - Representation (60 Members): SPÖ 27, FPÖ 17, ÖVP 5, Greens 5, NEOS 4, KPÖ 2

Area
  - Total: 31.8 km^{2} (12.3 sq mi)

Population (2016-01-01)
  - Total: 194,820
  - Density: 6,130/km^{2} (15,900/sq mi)
- Postal code: A-1100
- Address of District Office: Keplerplatz 5 A-1100 Wien (image below)
- Website: www.wien.gv.at/bezirke/favoriten/

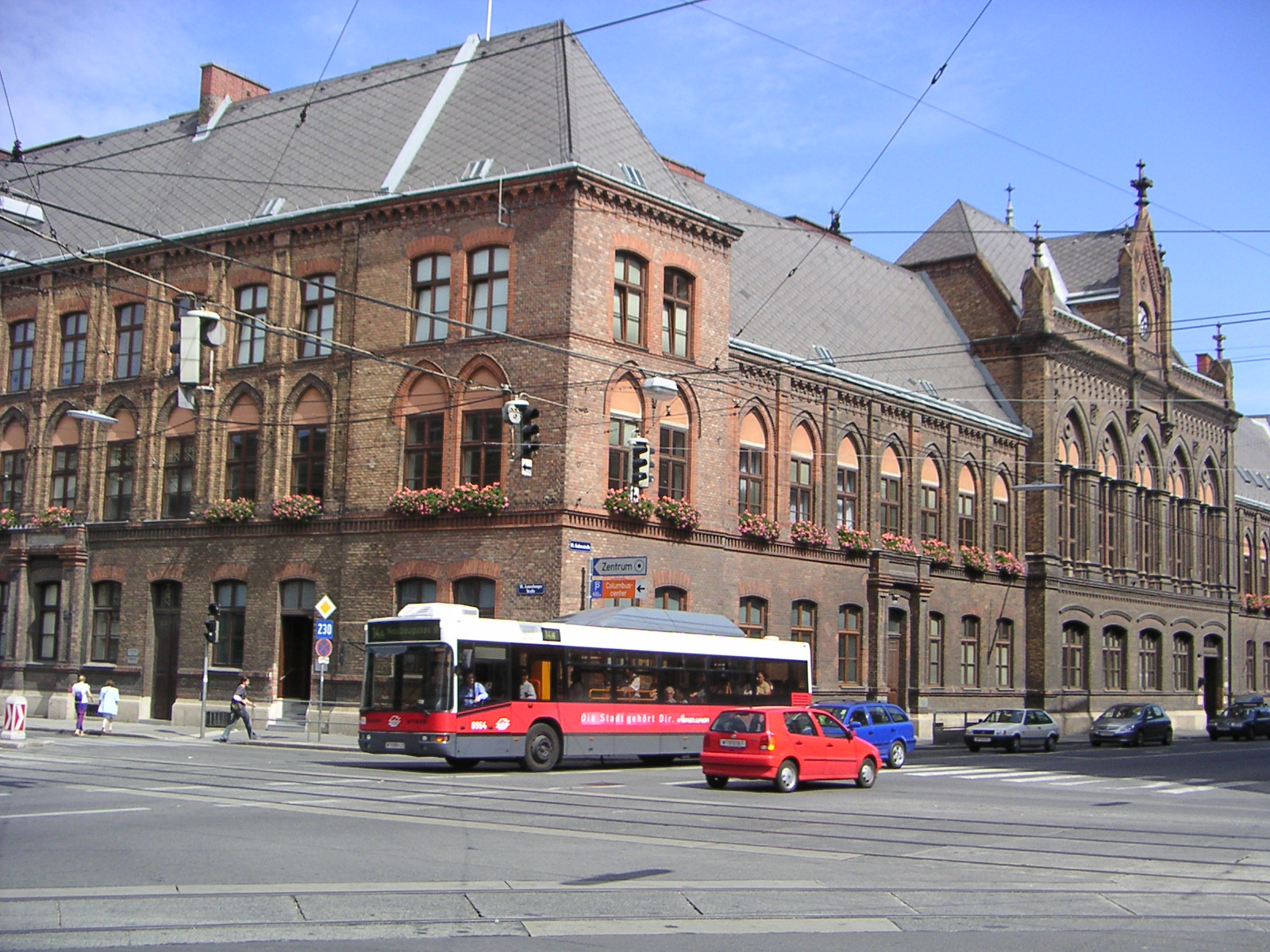
The Amtshaus (Magistratisches Bezirksamt), Favoriten's administrative centre, was built in 1881-82 and is one of the few red brick buildings to be found in Vienna today.

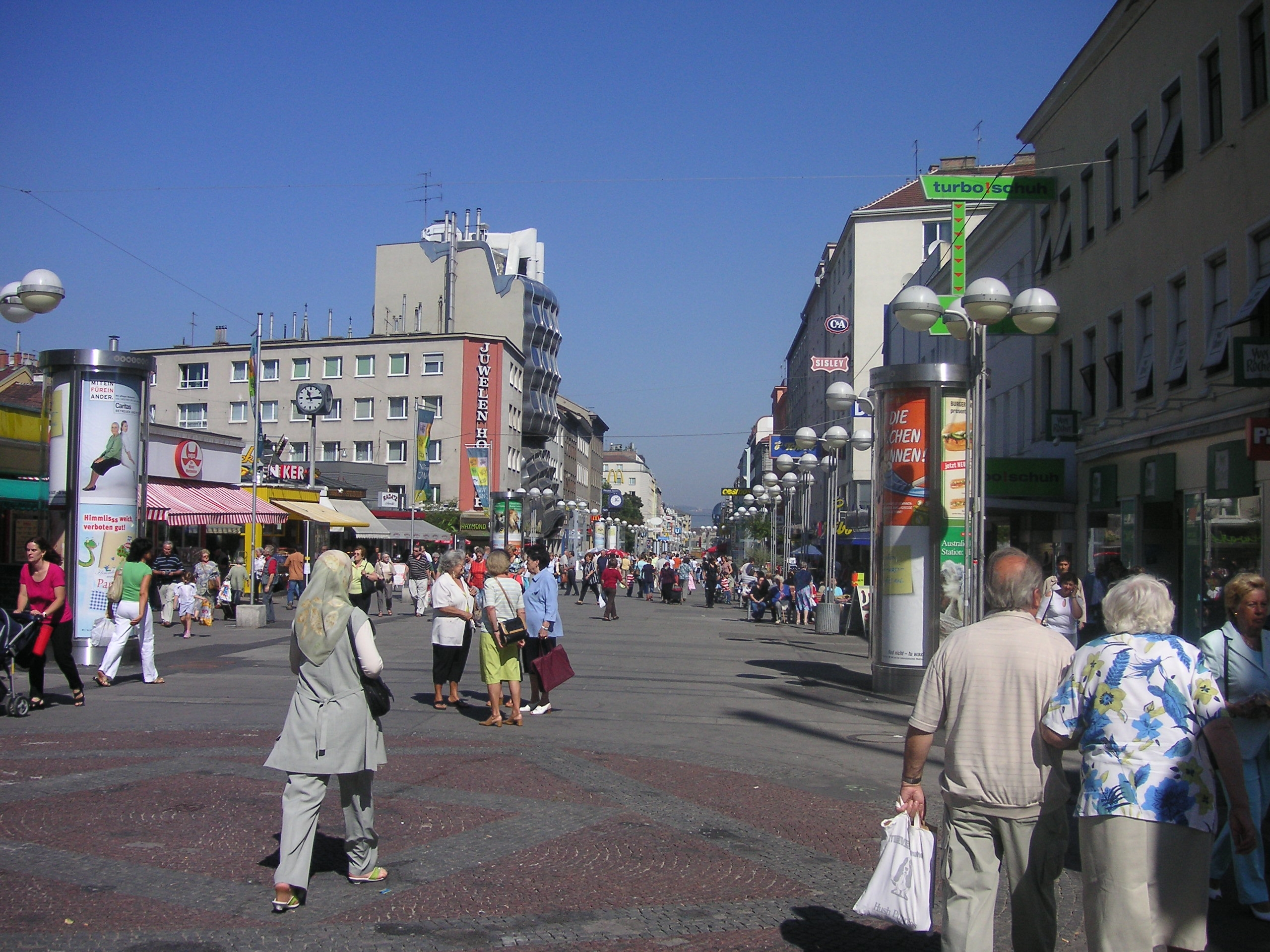
The Favoritenstraße is Favoriten's main artery. One of Vienna's first car-free zones, it is close to the Viktor-Adler-Markt (to the left).

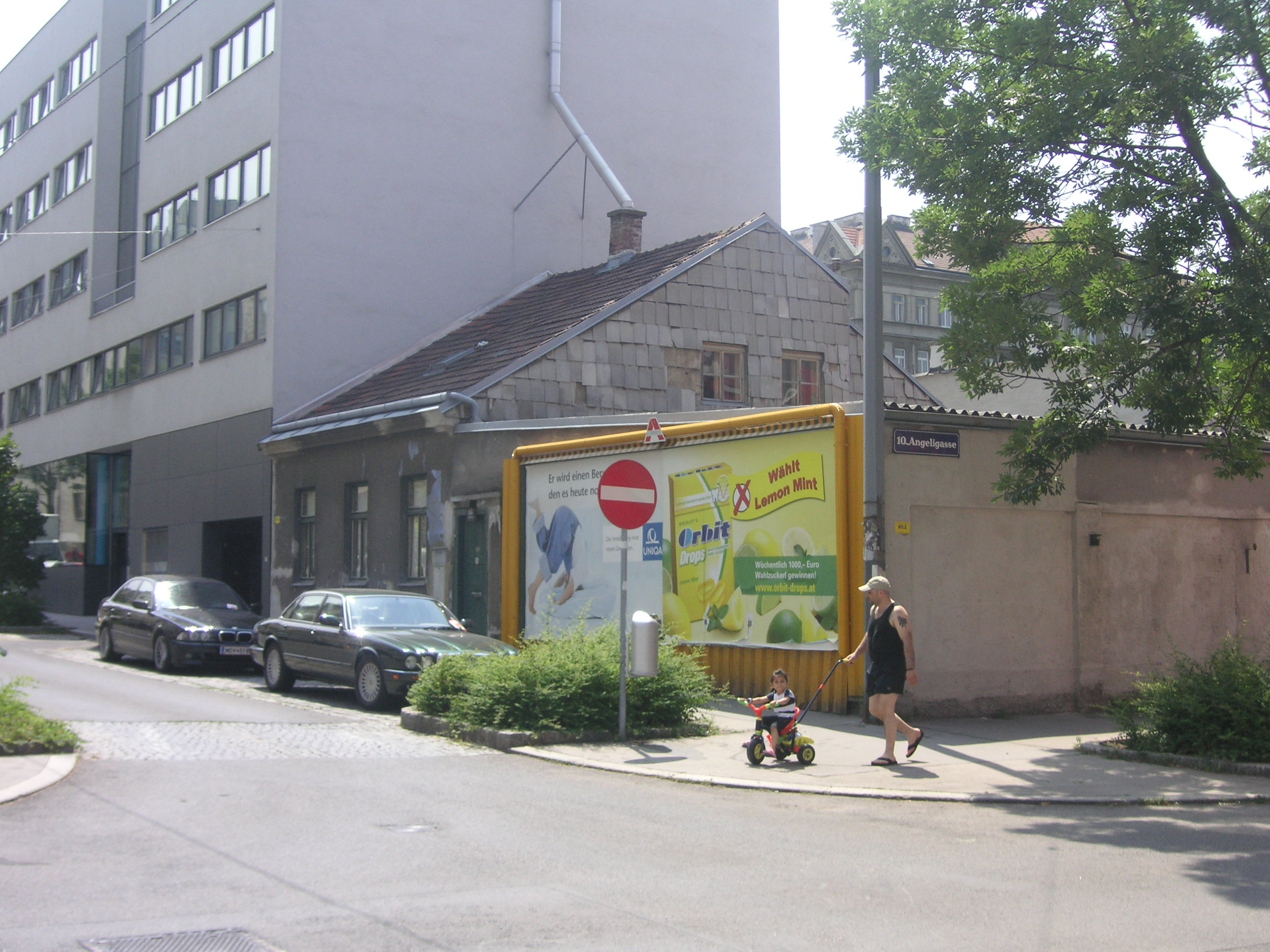
While on the outskirts of the city altogether new housing estates appear, in the heartland of Favoriten older buildings are successively being replaced by newer, bigger structures.

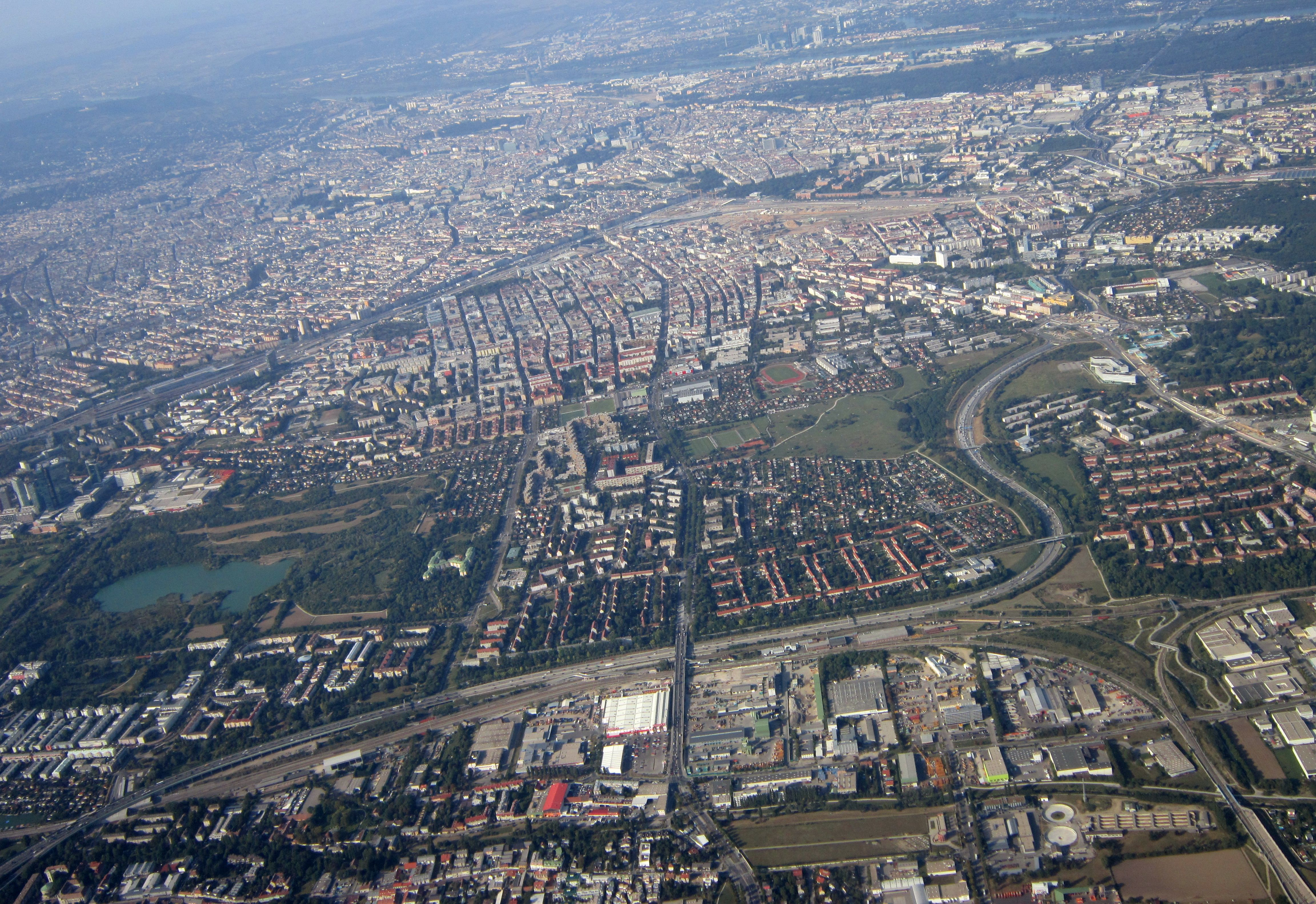
Aerial photo showing Wienerberg in the foreground, Karl-Wrba-Hof to the right of it, and Wien Südbahnhof station further away

Favoriten (German pronunciation: [fafoˈʁiːtn̩]; Viennese: Favoritn), the 10th district of Vienna, Austria (German: 10. Bezirk, Favoriten), is located south of the central districts. It is south of Innere Stadt, Wieden and Margareten. Favoriten is a heavily populated urban area with many residential buildings, but also large recreational areas and parks.

The name comes from Favorita, a semi-baroque palace complex that once served as a hunting castle but today is the Theresianum, a Gymnasium (middle and high school) in the 4th district (Wieden). The customs facilities at the original southern border of Vienna were known as the Favoriten-Linie (Favoriten Line) while nearby houses were known as the Siedlung vor der Favoriten-Linie (Settlement in front of the Favoriten Line).

== District sections ==
The Favoriten District includes six sections: Katastralgemeinden Favoriten, Inzersdorf-Stadt, Rothneusiedl, Unterlaa, Oberlaa-Stadt and Oberlaa-Land, as well as small parts of the two sections Katastralgemeinden Kaiserebersdorf and Simmering.

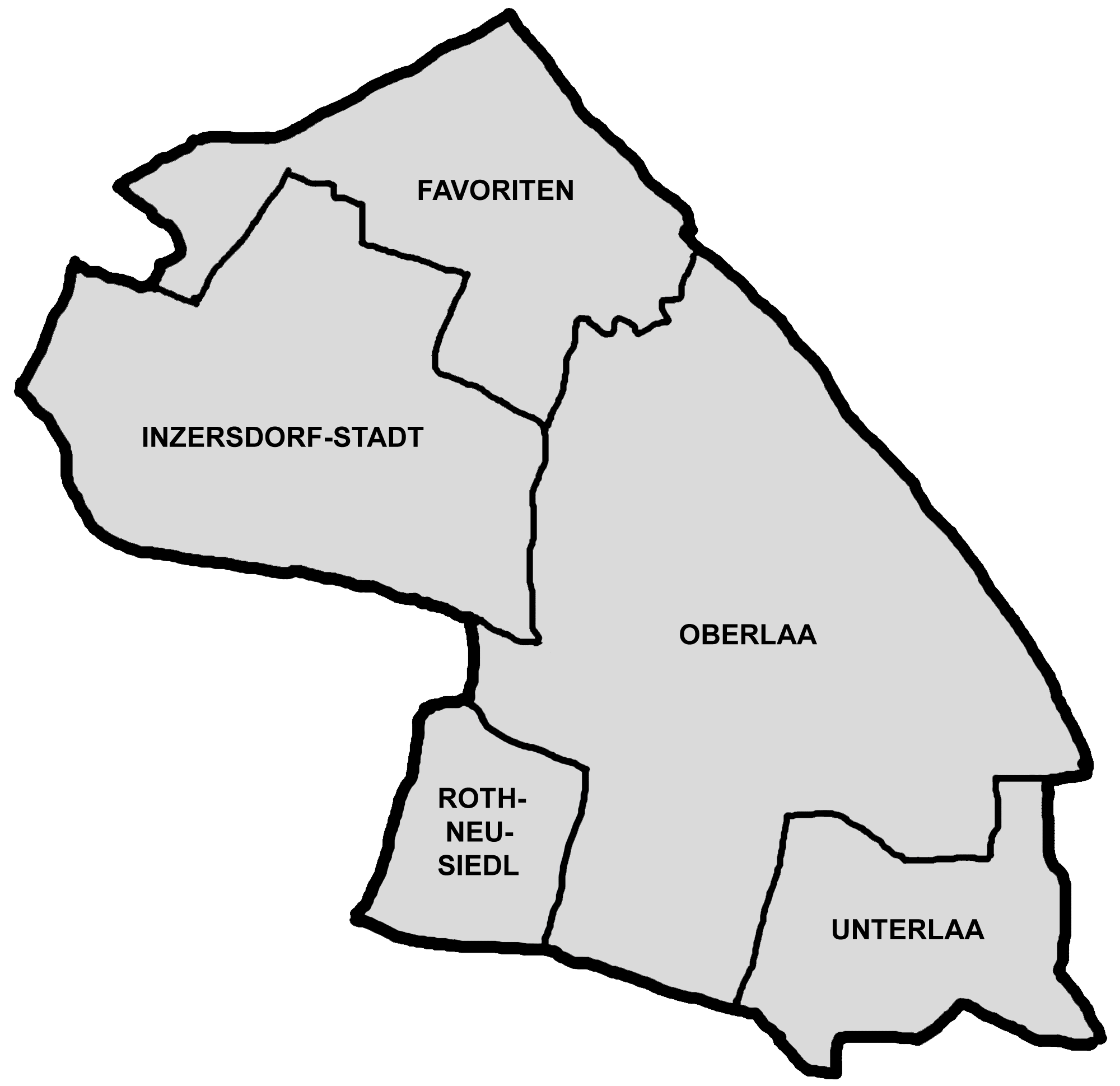

The northern part of the district is the historical Favoriten (Workers District), a grid-patterned residential area with many houses over 100 years old, plus intermediate industries (such as the complex of Ankerbrot AG). On the western edge of the district are two contrasting developments, opposite each other: during the inter-war period, George Washington Court was built (as a stylish Gemeindebau); and during 1990–2000, Business Park Vienna was built, including Vienna Twin Towers (skyscrapers), bounded on the south, by the 40-years-older Philipshaus on Trieste Street, in the architecture of classical Modernism.

== Geography ==
The district is bordered by the districts Meidling to the west, Liesing to the southwest, Margareten and Wieden to the north, and Simmering to the east. The Südbahn serves Favoriten in the north and Vienna Main Station, which lies in the northeast of the district. The rail line forms the northern border of the district running by the foot of the Wienerberg (Vienna Mountain) before turning southwards past Laaer Berg (Laa Mountain) to Liesingtal (Liesing Valley), where the Lower Austrian towns of Hennersdorf, Leopoldsdorf and Schwechat are.

== History ==
In 1874, the former settlement of Favoriten was annexed by Vienna as the 10th district. The first district director was the well-known Johann Steudel, who ran a tavern in the former settlement. The district expanded its borders quickly as industries and the associated housing grew in the area. After World War II, Vienna was divided into quarters and split among the Allies, and Favoriten belonged to the Soviet-occupied sector. Favoriten was last expanded in 1954, when the former villages of Rothneusiedl, Oberlaa and Unterlaa were annexed to the district.

In the Oberlaa/Rothneusiedl area, there are several constructions named after well-known Swedish people, such as the Per-Albin-Hansson-Siedlung, the Olof Palme-Hof, and the Selma-Lagerlöf-Gasse. This is to honour the Swedish support after the war. Per Albin Hansson, the Swedish social-democratic politician, for instance lent a lot of support to Vienna after World War II.

== Population ==
Historical population
Year	Pop.	±%
1869	22,340	—
1880	54,681	+144.8%
1890	88,230	+61.4%
1900	133,009	+50.8%
1910	159,241	+19.7%
1923	150,403	−5.6%
1934	166,486	+10.7%
1939	144,296	−13.3%
1951	115,324	−20.1%
1961	134,761	+16.9%
1971	153,695	+14.1%
1981	147,101	−4.3%
1991	147,636	+0.4%
2001	150,636	+2.0%
2011	177,989	+18.2%
2021	211,818	+19.0%
Source: Censuses

In 1869, the current area covered by the Favoriten District included only 22,340 inhabitants. Due to the huge influx of workers in the district area up to the beginning of the First World War, the district population increased 7-fold up to 1910 as 159,241 inhabitants. Thereafter, the district's population declined until the 1930s, fell during the Second World War, but for the next 40 years gradually increased. Unlike many downtown districts, the population numbers grew in the 1950s and 60s again, as the district had sufficient land area for new buildings, which expanded due to the housing demand. From the '70s, the population began to stagnate; however, since 2001, the number of inhabitants has increased significantly and, at the beginning of 2007, amounted to 169,578 people.

=== Population structure ===
The age of the population in Favoriten from 2001 is average for Vienna. The number of children under 15 years was 14.6%, against the Vienna area average of 14.7%. The proportion of the population 15 to 59 years was 62.6% (Vienna: 63.6%), only slightly below average. This showed particularly in the younger population deficits, while the number of people aged 60 or more years with 22.8%, was above the value of Vienna (21.7%). The gender distribution in the district area was 47.7% men and 52.8% women, the number of Favoriten marriages had a share of 42.9% compared to 41.2%, above the average of Vienna.

=== Origin and language ===
The proportion of foreign residents in the district was 32.8% in 2016, compared with 27.4% for Vienna as a whole. This represents a significant increase from 16.5% in 2001, reflecting a broader upward trend across the state. In 2005, the largest foreign nationality group consisted of individuals from Serbia and Montenegro, accounting for 5.5% of the district population. Other notable groups included Turkish(3.9%), Croatian (2%), Bosnian (1.6%), Polish (1.3%), and German (0.6%) nationals.

In 2001, 23.7% of Favoriten's population had been born outside Austria. In terms of colloquial language use, 7.4% reported Turkish, 6.8% Serbian, and 2.6% Croatian as their primary language. The district has also seen the growth of Afghan and Syrian communities, particularly following the European migrant crisis of 2015.

=== Religious preferences ===
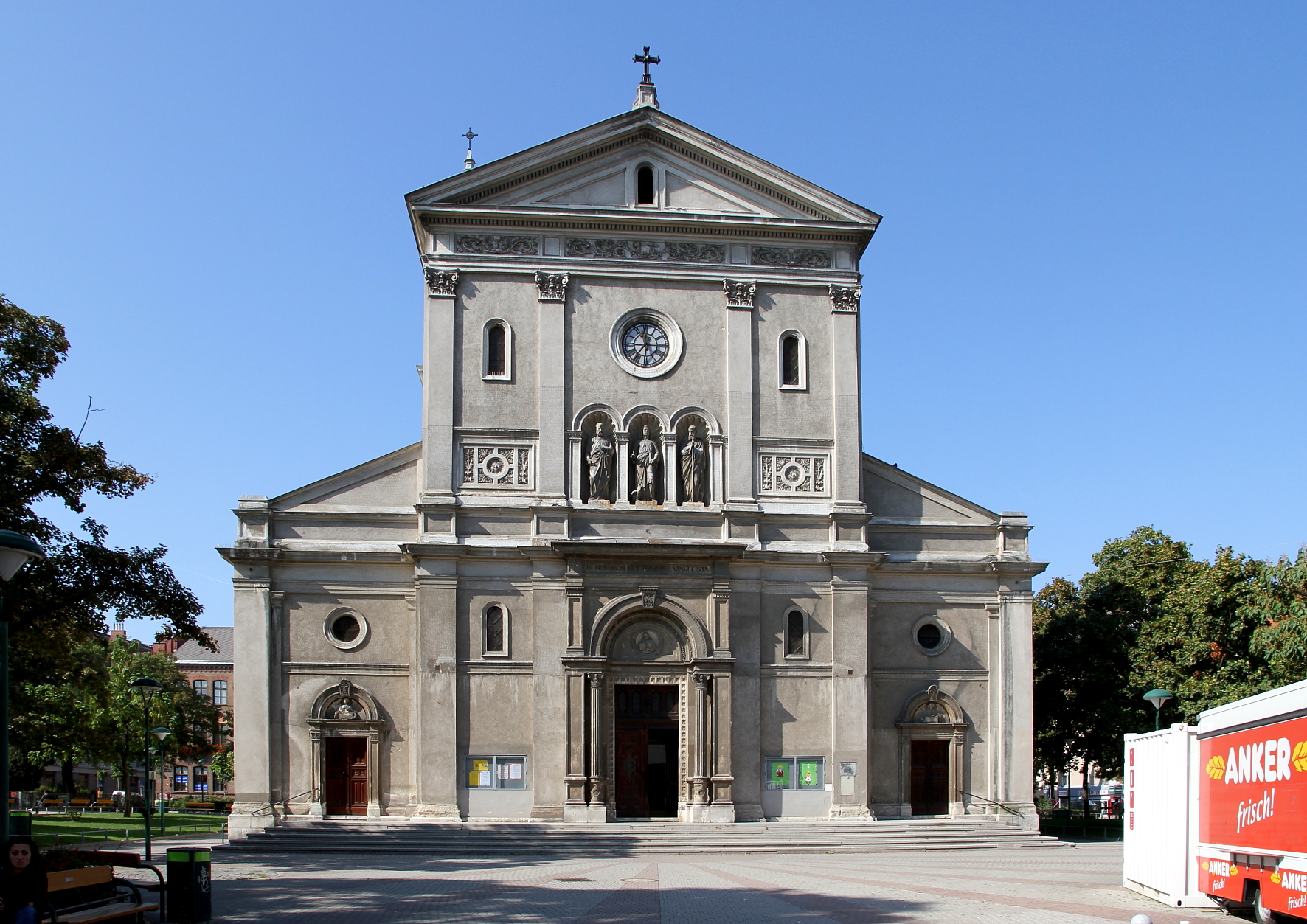
Roman Catholic parish church at Keplerplatz

The religion of the population in the Favoriten District, in the 2001 census, had a proportion of Muslim population higher than the average of Vienna. In 2001, 47.0% of the inhabitants had membership to the Roman Catholic Church (Vienna citywide: 49.2%). There were 15 Roman Catholic parishes, the City Deanery had 10 images. Nearly 11.2% of residents were Islamic faith (Vienna citywide: 7.8%), 6.4% belonged to the Eastern Orthodox Church, and 4.1% were Protestant. Nearly 26.5% of the district population, however, belonged to no religious group, and 4.9% had no religion or other preference given.

== Infrastructure ==
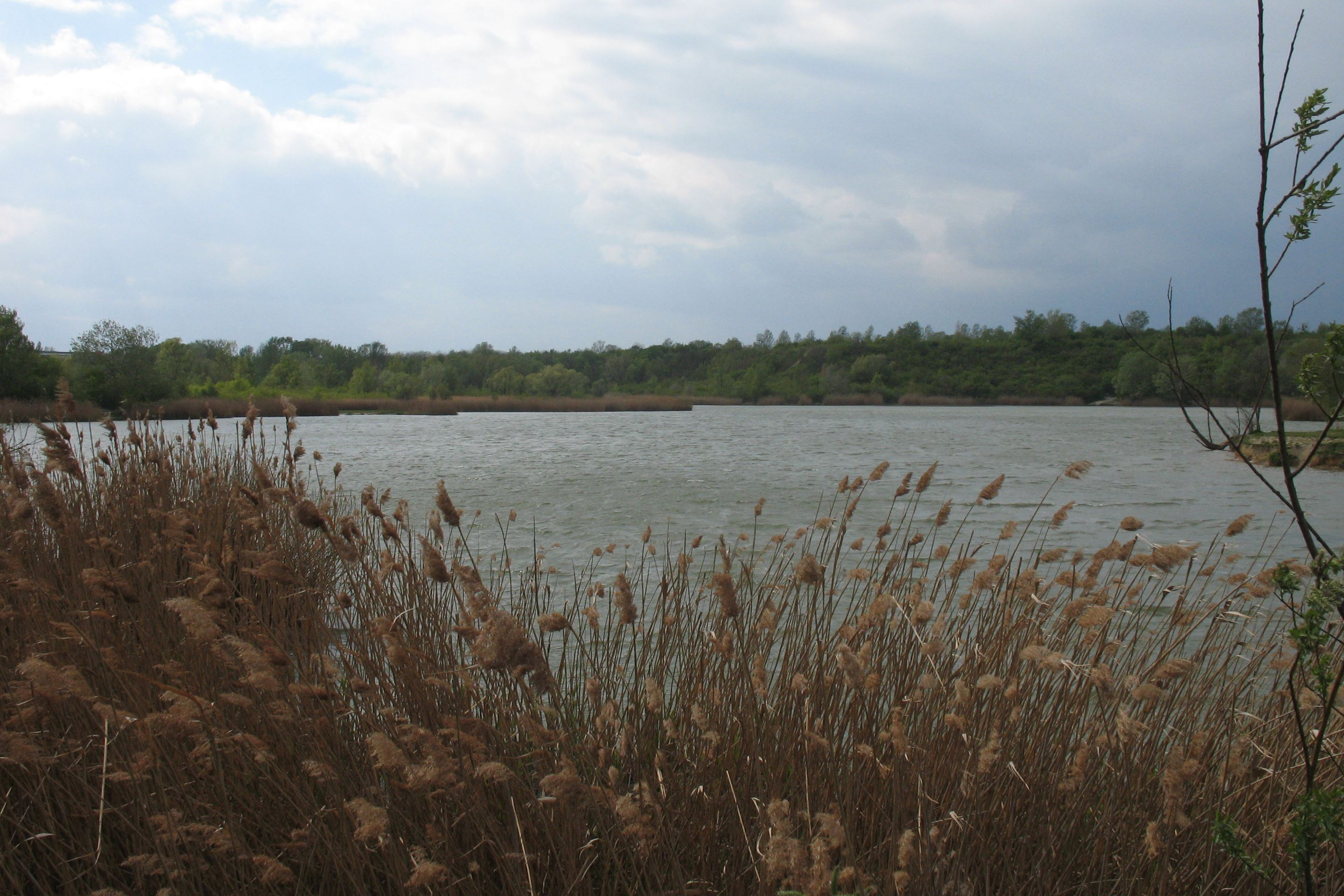
Wienerberg pond

Favoriten is the most populous of the districts of Vienna. Most of Favoriten's residential area is composed of a variety of houses, that are over 100 years old, as well as community housing developments (such as the Hansson-Siedlung). The district also has numerous industries. There are recreational areas in the southern part of the district, such as the Kurpark Laaer Berg (Treatment Park of Laa Mountain), which, in 1974, joined the Kurzentrum Oberlaa (Treatment Centre of Upper Laa), a sulphur spring, and the recreational centre at Wienerberg. On the north side of Laaer Berg, a small theme park, the Bohemian Prater, was built in 1882. Furthermore, the Ernst Kirchweger Haus (EKH), a squatted social centre, is situated in Favoriten.

Wien Hauptbahnhof, the main railway station of Vienna, is also located in Favoriten.

Gothic stone tower: Spinnerin am Kreuz.	The Kurpark Oberlaa is one of Vienna's large Naherholungsgebiete (recreational areas).

== Transport ==
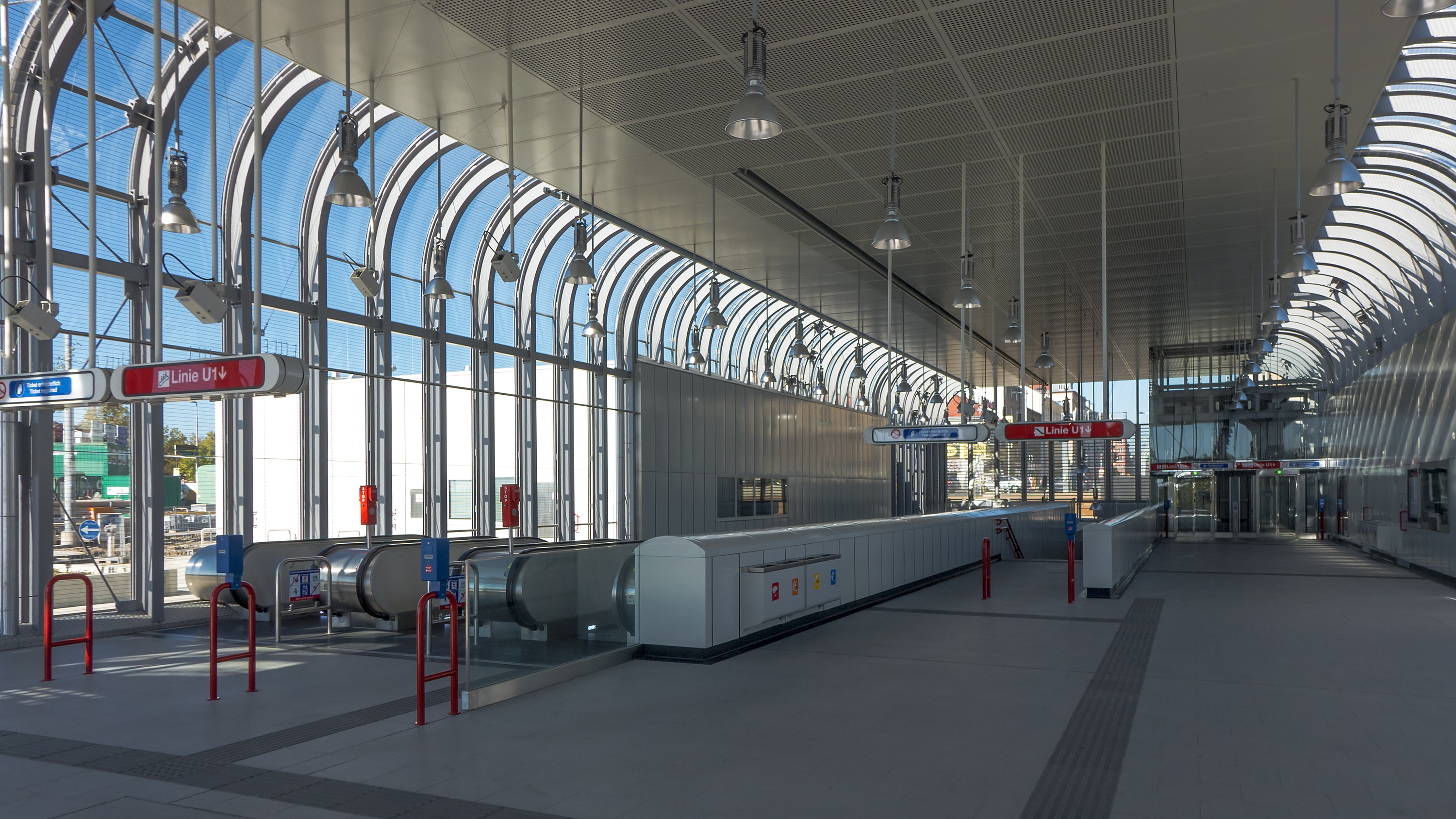
Reception hall of Altes Landgut metro station, south entry

In 2017, Red line of Vienna U-Bahn has been extendet from Reumannplatz station to Oberlaa. A advance work for a possible extension to Rothneusiedl via Stockholmer Platz and Oberlaaer Str. has been consteucted at Alaudagasse station.

Common lines of Vienna tram are 6 and 67, line 15A of Autobus Wien (city bus Vienna) connects Favoriten to the long distance train service in Wien Meidling station.

The Donauländebahn passes Favoriten in the south, but there currently is not passenger service on it.

Since 2023, a parking ticket is required for parking at the street in whole Vienna, alternatively, Oberlaa station, Neulaa station and Altes Landgut station have a Park and Ride faciality as well as Bike and Ride facialities for bicycles and not-motorized vehicles.

== Landmarks ==
1. Spinnerin am Kreuz - Gothic stone tower built in 1375
2. Wasserturm - Water tower (cistern)

== Sports ==
Favoriten is home to the stadium of one of the most successful Austrian Bundesliga teams FK Austria Wien, who play at the Generali Arena. Favoriten is also home to a smaller club which came to prominence in the 80's Favoritner AC and another formerly successful smaller club KSV Ankerbrot Montelaa.

== Politics ==
=== District Government ===
District Directors from 1945
Eduard Friemel (KPÖ)	4/1945-7/1945
Karl Kempf (KPÖ)	7/1945-1946
Karl Wrba (SPÖ)	1946–1966
Emil Fucik (SPÖ)	1966–1977
Josef Deutsch (SPÖ)	1977–1984
Leopold Prucha (SPÖ)	1984–1994
Hermine Mospointner (SPÖ)	1994–2017
Marcus Franz (SPÖ)	2017–present

As a labour district, Favoriten is traditionally Social Democratic so that the Socialists have been continuously represented since 1946. Commonly the SPÖ reached the absolute majority, which was only in danger after the rise of the FPÖ at the end of the eighties under Jörg Haider. 1996 the FPÖ increased 8.6% and the absolute majority of the SPÖ was broken the first time. Through the downfall of the FPÖ the revanche came in 2001 and the Socialists regained the absolute majority. 2010 the SPÖ lost nearly 10% the FPÖ took most advantage of this and also increased by 14%. The ÖVP makes no odds here and reached in average not more than 12%. Also the Greens are under their average percent of voters here. At the district election 2010 all parliament parties lost except for FPÖ and BZÖ.

Bezirksvertretungswahlen 1991–2010
Jahr	SPÖ	ÖVP	FPÖ	Grüne	LIF since 205 NEOS	BZÖ	Sonstige
1991	56.8	12.3	22.3	6.3	n.k	-	2.3
1996	45.5	10.6	30.8	5.6	5.6	-	1.9
2001	55.6	10.8	22.6	7.9	2.2	-	0.9
2005	56.7	12.3	19.5	8.5	0.4	1.1	1.6
2010	47.4	9.1	33.3	7.1	0.5	1.1	1.4
2015	40.4	6.7	38.2	7.1	3.5	-	4.2

=== Coat of arms ===
Coat of Arms for Favoriten.

The coat of arms of the 10th district is a shield divided into six parts:

- In the upper-left corner is the coat of arms of the former village of Favoriten. It shows the Apostle John, the patron saint of the Pfarrkirche church at Keplerplatz, wearing a green cape and a blue robe. He is holding a quill and the Gospel. An eagle is shown next to him.
- In the upper-right, a well made of shell stands against a blue background and symbolises Oberlaa. This reminds us of the healing springs and the treatment centres of the district.
- In the lower-left, a red kiln and a flowing stream symbolise Rothneusiedl. It reflects the importance of the brick industry at Wienerberg and Laaerberg.
- In the lower-right, Inzersdorf-Stadt is represented by golden wine grapes with spikes from the top, reminiscent of the once economically important vineyards.
- The lower part shows a red Maltese Cross on a golden background, and symbolises Unterlaa and the Knights Hospitaller that ruled the area until the end of the 13th century.
- The centre part symbolises the district as a whole, an attribute not shared by any other district, and displays the Spinnerin am Kreuz, a symbol of Favoriten.

== Notable residents ==
- Gerhard Bronner, Kabarettist and writer
- Felix Czeike, author/historian
- Daniel Glattauer, writer
- Jakob Reumann, Mayor of Vienna from 1919–1923
- Matthias Sindelar, footballer & captain of Wunderteam
- Karl Svoboda, politician
- Helmut Zilk, Mayor of Vienna from 1984–1994
- Willi Resetarits, musician, 1948–2022
