= Bohemian Prater =

Amusement park in Vienna

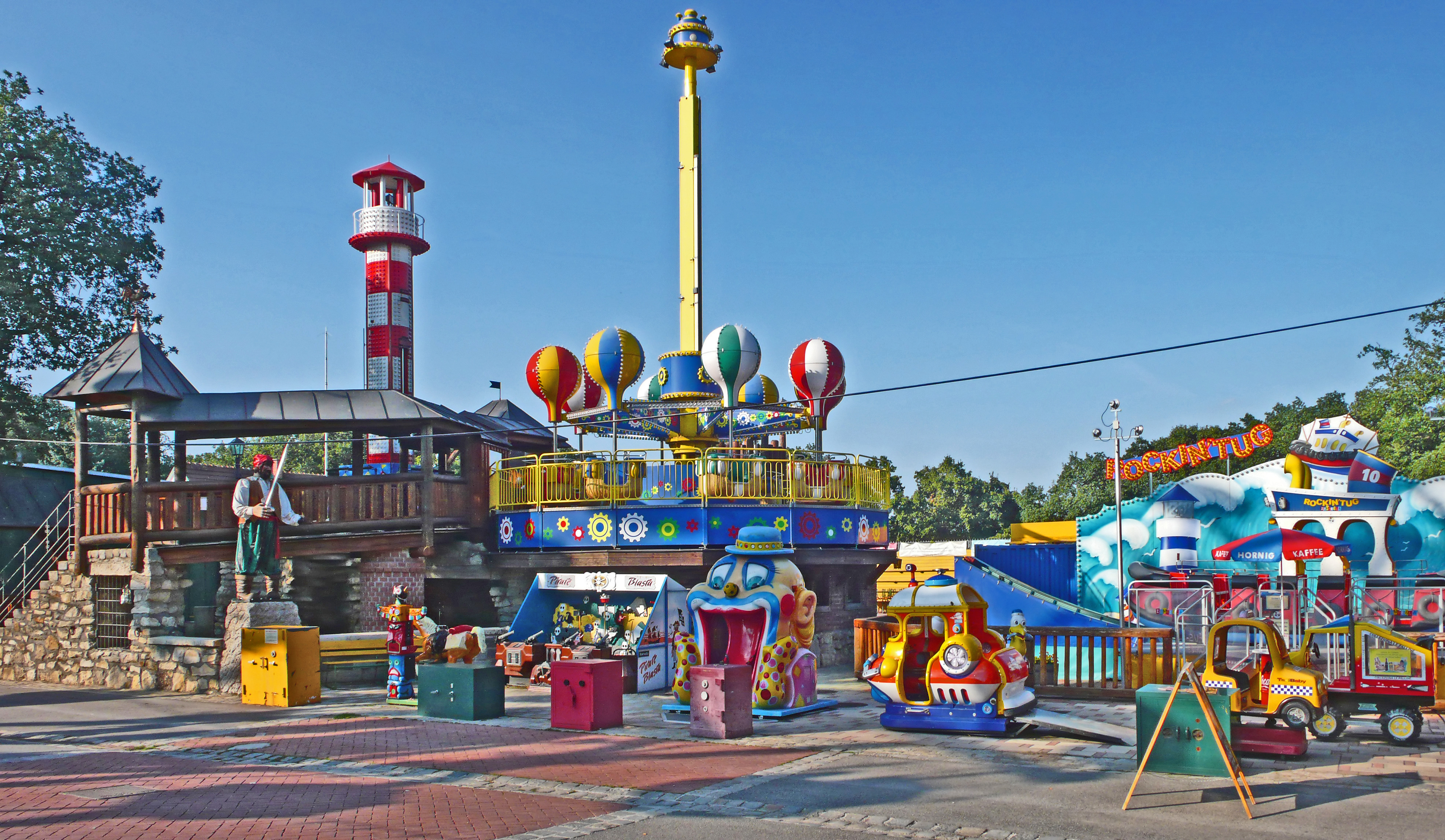
- Bohemian Prater
- Interactive map of Bohemian Prater
- Location: Favoriten, Vienna, Austria
- Coordinates: 48.16653°N 16.40018°E
- Website: www.xn--bhmischer-prater-mwb.at Archived 2023-08-11 at the Wayback Machine

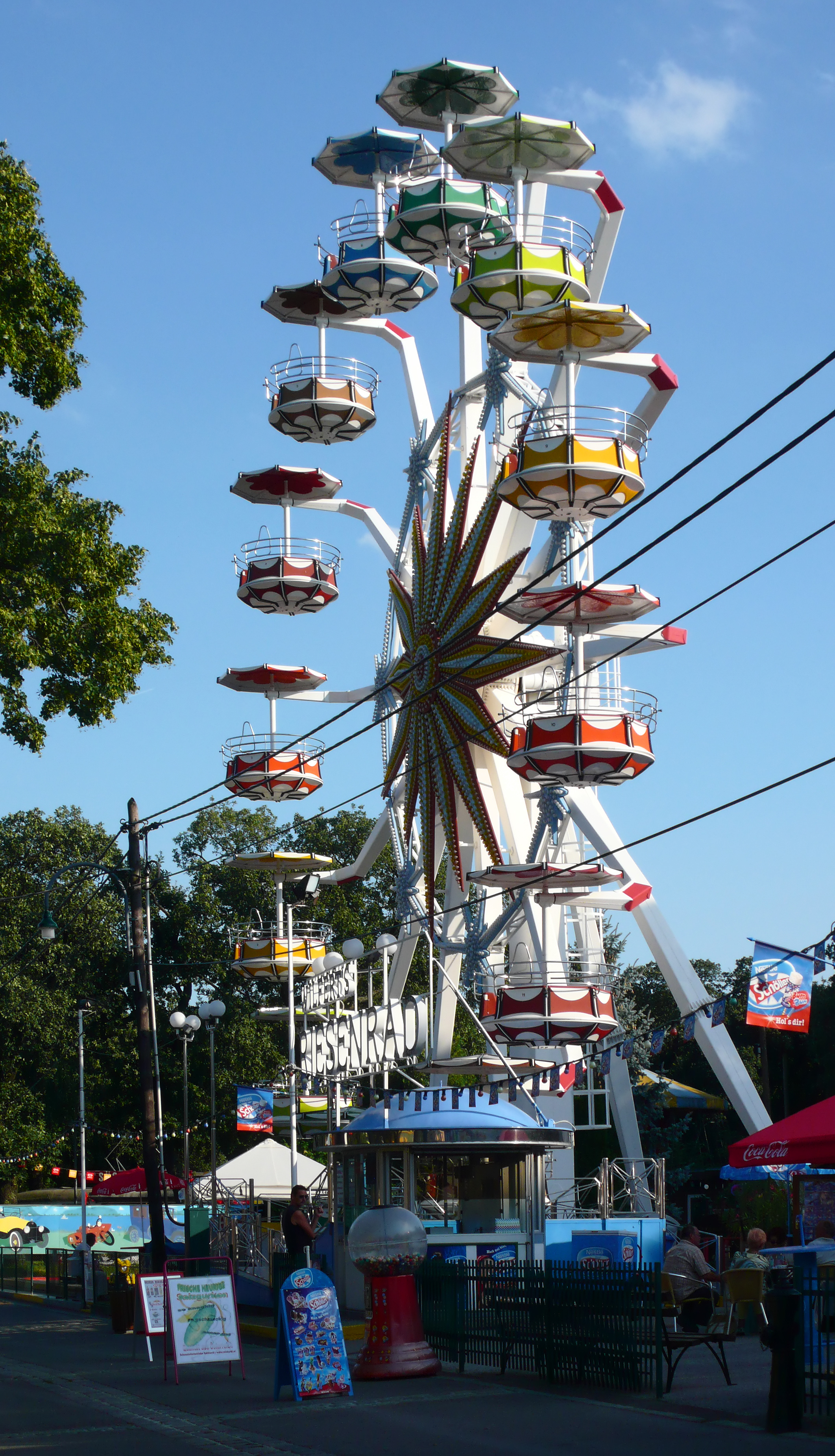
Ferris wheel

The Bohemian Prater (German: Böhmischer Prater) is a small amusement park at the edge of Vienna, in Favoriten, Vienna's 10th district. It dates to the second half of the 19th century, and some of the rides are more than 100 years old. The name is derived from the larger Wiener (Viennese) Prater in Vienna's Leopoldstadt (2nd) district.

On 11 December 1944, during World War II, the Bohemian Prater was almost completely destroyed by a bomb attack.

The centre of the Bohemian Prater forms the meeting centre Tivoli.

== History ==
In the 19th century, workers mostly spent their meager free time in inns. Excursions and walks were the only entertainment. Since the second half of the 19th century, the Laa Forest has been one of the most popular destinations for excursions and can be reached on foot in around 15 minutes from Favoriten.

Franz Bauer, a canteen manager at the Laaer Wald brickworks, ran a small inn here, which soon became a popular destination for Sunday excursions for the so-called "Ziegelboehm", the workers of the Vienna brickworks who mainly came from Bohemia and Moravia. In 1882, Franz Bauer applied for permission to hold games next to his inn and set up a swing and a merry-go-round.

A little later, an innkeeper opened another excursion inn on the Laaer Berg. In 1884, 20 restaurants and numerous showmen had already settled in the Laaer Wald, which formed the basis of the small Prater and was soon given the name "BÖHMISCHER PRATER" because of its visitors. It soon became the most important place of entertainment for the people of Favoriten and Simmering.

== Ferris wheel ==
As with the large Prater in Vienna, there is a Ferris wheel. It is a 21.5-metre (71 ft) tall cantilever design with 14 passenger cars, and is operated by Reinhardt.
