= Nelio Biedermann =

Swiss author

Nelio Biedermann (born 2003) is a Swiss writer best known for Lázár, his second novel.

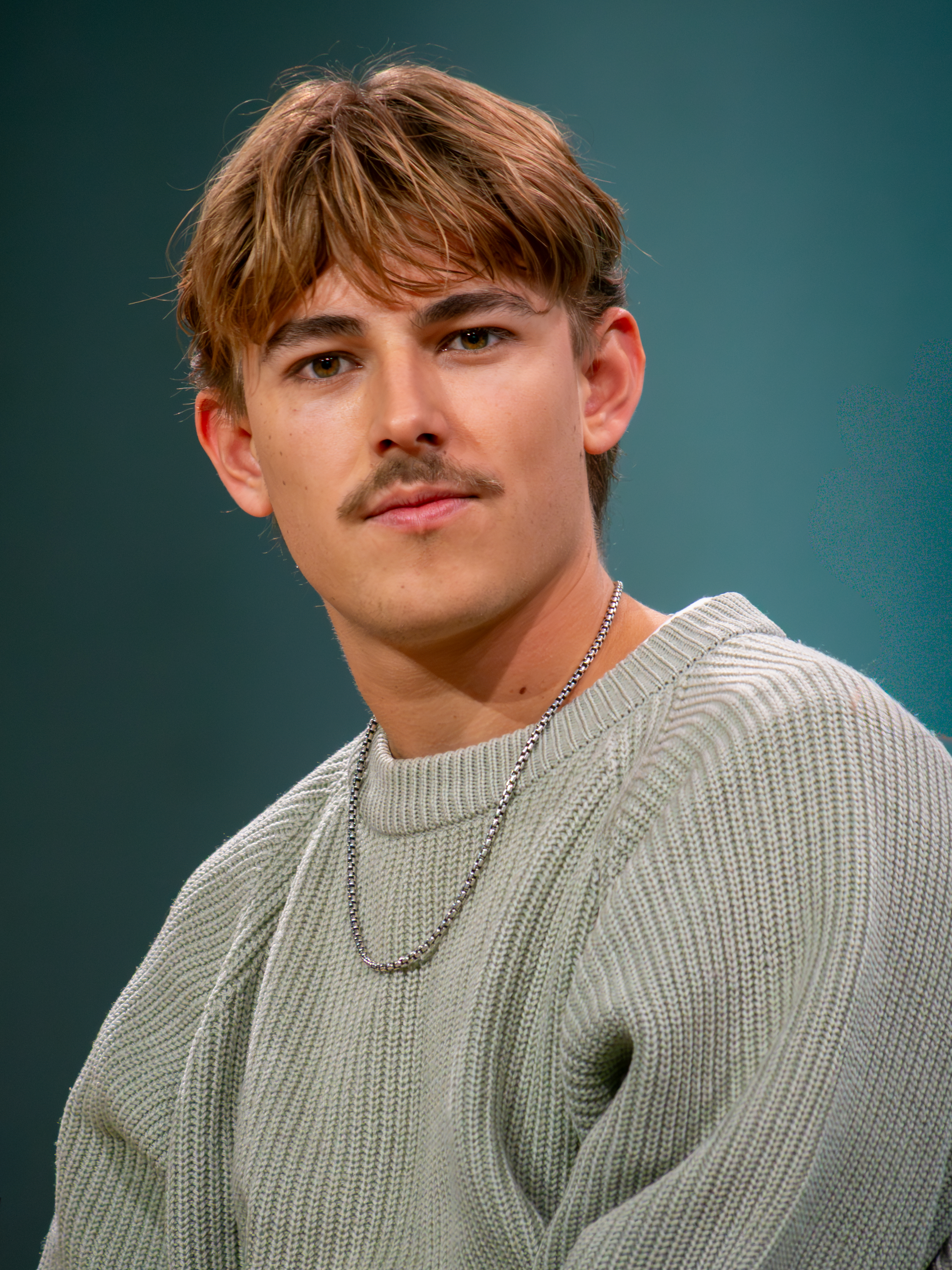
Nelio Biedermann (2025)

== Early life and education ==
Biedermann grew up with a sister in Thalwil, on the shores of Lake Zurich. His family is of Hungarian noble descent on his father's side; his grandparents fled to Switzerland in the 1950s.

In 2022, he completed his secondary education at the Kantonsschule Enge, where his matriculation thesis, a novel entitled Verwischte Welt accompanied by a collection of short stories, was recognised by the Canton of Zurich as one of the five best submissions of the year.

Biedermann studies German literature and film studies at the University of Zurich.

== Career ==
His début novel, Anton will bleiben, was published in 2023 by the Swiss Arisverlag, telling the story of an elderly man dying of cancer.

In the summer of 2024, seven German-language publishers competed for the rights to Lázár, his second novel. Around the time of the Frankfurt Book Fair in autumn 2024, publishing rights were acquired by twenty international publishers, including in the United States, the United Kingdom, France, Spain, Poland, the Czech Republic, and Hungary. The English-language edition was translated by Jamie Bulloch and published by MacLehose Press in April 2026.

== Works ==
- Anton will bleiben. Roman. Arisverlag, Embrach 2023, ISBN 978-3-907238-29-5
- Lázár. Roman. Rowohlt Berlin, Berlin 2025, ISBN 978-3-7371-0226-1

== Awards ==
- 2025: Shortlisted for the Swiss Book Prize for Lázár
- 2025: "Der Kleine Hei" award, Wist Literaturladen, for Lázár
- 2025: Lieblingsbuch der Unabhängigen for Lázár
