= Jamie Bulloch =

British historian and translator

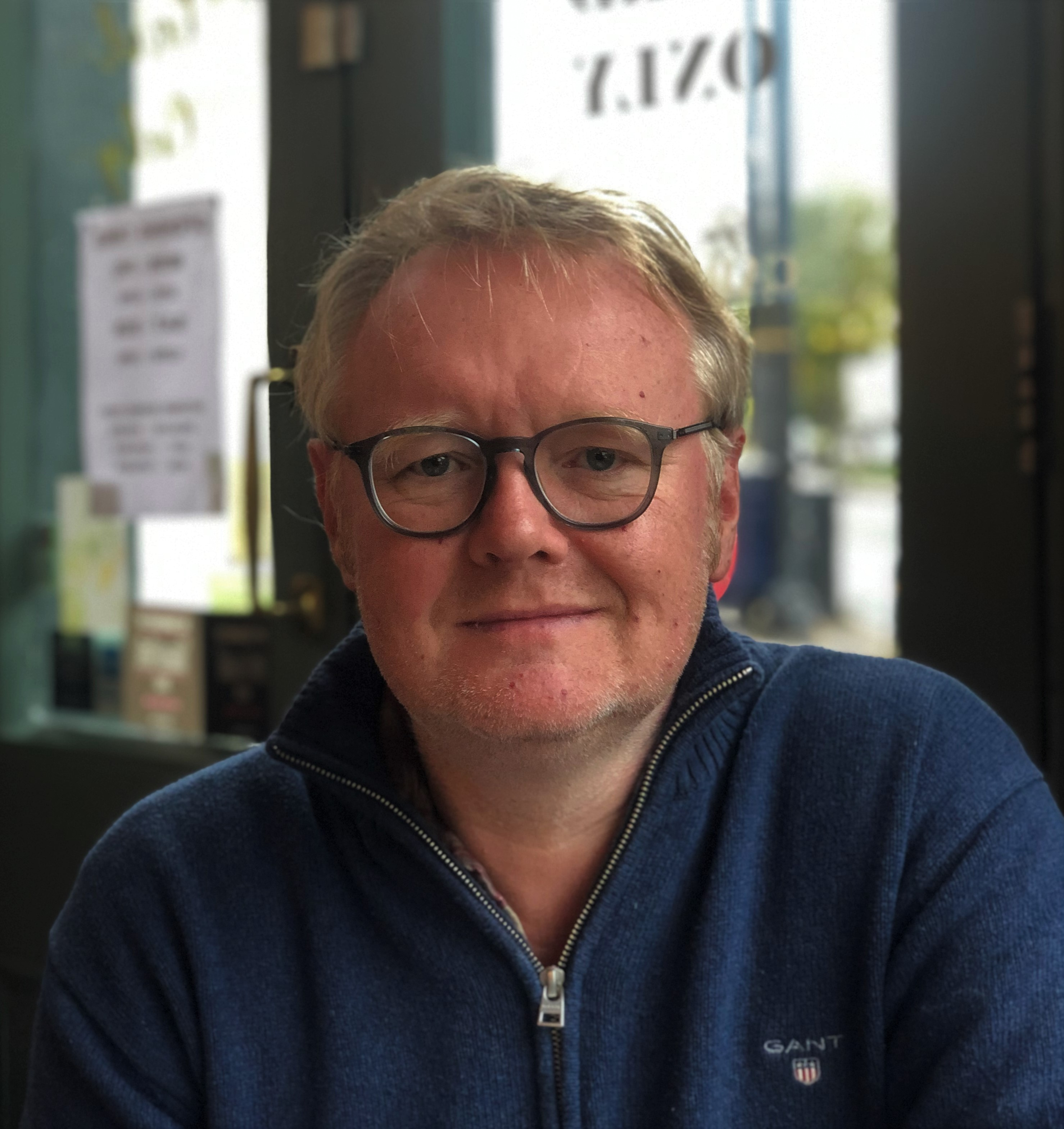
- Bulloch in 2020
- Born: 6 September 1969 (age 57); East Dulwich, London, England
- Education: Bristol University; School of Slavonic and East European Studies
- Occupations: Translator, historian
- Spouse: Katharina Bielenberg
- Children: 3
- Father: Jeremy Bulloch
- Relatives: Robert Watts (half-uncle)

Jamie Bulloch (born 6 September 1969) is a British historian and translator of German literature, with over sixty published titles to his name. He is also twice winner of the Schlegel-Tieck prize.

== Life and work ==
Bulloch was born at East Dulwich Hospital, London, in 1969 and grew up in Tooting. He first attended Rosemead School, then Whitgift School, where he opened the bowling for the 1st XI. In 1981 he performed with the Children's Music Theatre (now National Youth Music Theatre) at the Edinburgh Fringe in a production directed by Jeremy James Taylor, which was also filmed for Granada Television the same year. He returned to the Fringe in 1983 and 1989, appearing latterly in Silver, written by Jonathan Smith and directed by Anthony Seldon.

After taking a first in Modern Languages at Bristol University, he obtained an MA with distinction in Central European History at the School of Slavonic and East European Studies (SSEES). He took a couple of years out from studying to teach French and German at St Dunstan's College in London, then resumed with a PhD in interwar Austrian history in which he was supervised by Martyn Rady. He taught German language and Central European History at SSEES, UCL, King's College London and Warwick University, and he is the author of a book on Karl Renner in the 'Makers of the Modern World' series.

Recent translations include Organ Speak by Giulia Enders, Lázár by Nelio Biedermann, which has been shortlisted by both Waterstones and Foyles for their 2026 books of the year, and The Buried City by the Director of Pompeii Gabriel Zuchtriegel (Hodder Press). His best known work is Look Who's Back by Timur Vermes (MacLehose Press), which was longlisted for the 2016 IMPAC award and 2015 Independent Foreign Fiction Prize. His translation of Portrait of the Mother as a Young Woman was praised by the Times Literary Supplement. He and his wife, Katharina Bielenberg, jointly translated Daniel Glattauer's hit novel, Love Virtually, and its sequel, Every Seventh Wave, both of which were adapted into radio plays starring David Tennant and Emilia Fox. His translation of Hinterland by Arno Geiger won the 2023 Schlegel-Tieck prize, his second award following The Mussel Feast in 2014. He has been shortlisted on three further occasions, and runner-up twice. In 2021 he had two books on the shortlist for the Schlegel-Tieck Prize. Eight of his translations have been nominated for the Dublin Literary Award. Zen and the Art of Murder was shortlisted for the 2018 Crime Writers Association International Dagger. Another of Bulloch's translations is the 2017 German Book Prize winner, The Capital by Robert Menasse (MacLehose Press). Since 2013 Jamie has been a member of the New Books in German committee.

== Personal life ==
Jamie and Katharina live in London and have three daughters. His father was the British actor Jeremy Bulloch, best known for his portrayal of Boba Fett in the Star Wars films. (Note: He also portrayed Captain Colton in Star Wars: Episode III – Revenge of the Sith.) His brother Robbie portrayed Matthew of Wickham in Robin of Sherwood. (Note: Jeremy Bulloch portrayed the character's father, Edward Wickham.) His aunt Sally Bulloch was a child actress and had roles in several films including The Pure Hell of St Trinians. She later became the Executive Manager at The Athenaeum Hotel on Piccadilly.

== Bibliography ==
=== As author ===
- Karl Renner: Austria (Haus Publishing, 2009)

=== As translator ===
- The Sweetness of Life, Paulus Hochgatterer (MacLehose Press, 2008)
- Ruth Maier's Diary, Ruth Maier (Harvill Secker, 2009)
- Englischer Fussball, Raphael Honigstein (Yellow Jersey Press, 2009)
- Portrait of the Mother as a Young Woman, F.C. Delius (Peirene Press, 2010)
- Love Virtually, Daniel Glattauer (MacLehose Press, 2011)^{∗}
- The Mattress House, Paulus Hochgatterer (MacLehose Press, 2012)
- Mesmerized, Alissa Walser (MacLehose Press, 2012)
- Sea of Ink, Richard Weihe (Peirene Press, 2012)
- The Taste of Apple Seeds, Katharina Hagena (Atlantic Books, 2013)
- Every Seventh Wave, Daniel Glattauer (MacLehose Press, 2013)^{∗}
- The Mussel Feast, Birgit Vanderbeke (Peirene Press, 2013)
- The Chef, Martin Suter (Atlantic Books, 2013)
- Someday We'll Tell Each Other Everything, Daniela Krien (MacLehose Press, 2013)
- Four Meditations on Happiness, Michael Hampe (Atlantic Books, 2014)
- Look Who's Back, Timur Vermes (MacLehose Press, 2014)
- Forever Yours, Daniel Glattauer (MacLehose Press, 2014)
- Raw Material, Jörg Fauser (Clerkenwell Press, 2014)
- Schlump, Hans Herbert Grimm (Vintage Classics, 2015)
- A Very Special Year, Thomas Montasser (Oneworld Publications, 2016)
- Montecristo, Martin Suter (No Exit Press, 2016)
- The Girl Who Beat ISIS, Farida Khalaf and Andrea C. Hoffmann (Square Peg, 2016)
- The Empress and the Cake, Linda Stift (Peirene Press, 2016)
- Kingdom of Twilight, Steven Uhly (MacLehose Press, 2017)
- The Last Summer, Ricarda Huch (Peirene Press, 2017)
- Gunning for Greatness: My Life, Mesut Özil with Kai Psotta (Hodder & Stoughton, 2017)
- Zen and the Art of Murder, Oliver Bottini (MacLehose Press, 2018)
- Damnation, Peter Beck (Point Blank, 2018)
- One Clear, Ice-Cold January Morning at the Beginning of the Twenty-First Century, Roland Schimmelpfennig (MacLehose Press, 2018)
- Elefant, Martin Suter (4th Estate, 2018)
- A Summer of Murder, Oliver Bottini (MacLehose Press, 2018)
- The Capital, Robert Menasse (MacLehose Press, 2019)
- You Would Have Missed Me, Birgit Vanderbeke (Peirene Press, 2019)
- The Dance of Death, Oliver Bottini (MacLehose Press, 2019)
- The Hungry and the Fat, Timur Vermes (MacLehose Press, 2020)
- Dear Child, Romy Hausmann (Quercus Books, 2020)
- The Day My Grandfather Was a Hero, Paulus Hochgatterer (MacLehose Press, 2020)
- The Package, Sebastian Fitzek (Head of Zeus, 2020)
- Passenger 23, Sebastian Fitzek (Head of Zeus, 2021)
- Love in Five Acts, Daniela Krien (MacLehose Press, 2021)
- Sleepless, Romy Hausmann (Quercus Books, 2021)
- Night Hunters, Oliver Bottini (MacLehose Press, 2021)
- Alice's Book: How the Nazis Stole My Grandmother's Cookbook, Karina Urbach (MacLehose Press, 2022)
- Hinterland, Arno Geiger (Picador, 2022)
- Walk me Home, Sebastian Fitzek (Head of Zeus, 2022)
- Liminal, Roland Schimmelpfennig (MacLehose Press, 2023)
- The Invisible Web, Oliver Bottini (MacLehose Press, 2023)
- The Inmate, Sebastian Fitzek (Head of Zeus, 2023)
- The Fire, Daniela Krien (MacLehose Press, 2023)
- In the Long Run We're All Dead: The Lives and Deaths of Great Economists, Björn Frank (Haus Publishing, 2023)
- Anatomy of a Killer, Romy Hausmann (Quercus Books, 2023)
- What Mother Won't Tell Me, Ivar Leon Menger (Poisoned Pen Press, 2024)
- The White Circle, Oliver Bottini (MacLehose Press, 2024)
- Playlist, Sebastian Fitzek (Head of Zeus, 2024)
- Murder at the Castle, David Safier (Old Street Publishing, 2024)
- The Gift, Sebastian Fitzek (Head of Zeus, 2024)
- The Buried City: Unearthing the Real Pompeii, Gabriel Zuchtriegel (Hodder Press, 2025)
- Generation GDR: Truth, Freedom and One Man's Last Journey, Peter Wensierski (MacLehose Press, 2025)
- Mimik, Sebastian Fitzek (Head of Zeus, 2025)
- Darling Mine, Romy Hausmann (Quercus Books, 2026)
- Lázár, Nelio Biedermann (MacLehose Press, 2026)
- The Emperor Incognito: Joseph II's Journey through Enlightenment Europe, Monika Czernin (Haus Publishing, 2026)
- Short Circuit, Wolf Haas (HarperVia, 2026)
- Organ Speak: What It Really Means to Listen to Our Bodies, Giulia Enders (HarperOne; New River Books, 2026)
- My Third Life, Daniela Krien (MacLehose Press, 2026)

^{∗}Jointly translated with Katharina Bielenberg

== Awards and nominations ==
- 2023: Winner of the Schlegel-Tieck Prize (Hinterland)
- 2021: Two books shortlisted for the Schlegel-Tieck Prize (The Hungry and the Fat and The Day My Grandfather Was a Hero)
- 2020: Runner-up in the Schlegel-Tieck Prize (You Would Have Missed Me)
- 2020: Shortlisted for the Oxford-Weidenfeld Prize (You Would Have Missed Me)
- 2018: Shortlisted for the Crime Writers' Association International Dagger (Zen and the Art of Murder)
- 2014: Winner of the Schlegel-Tieck Prize (The Mussel Feast)
- 2014: Runner-up in the Independent Foreign Fiction Prize (The Mussel Feast)
- 2013: Runner-up in the Schlegel-Tieck Prize (Sea of Ink)
