= Spinnerin am Kreuz =

Stone-tower sculptures in Austria

Coordinates: 48°10′16″N 16°21′02″E

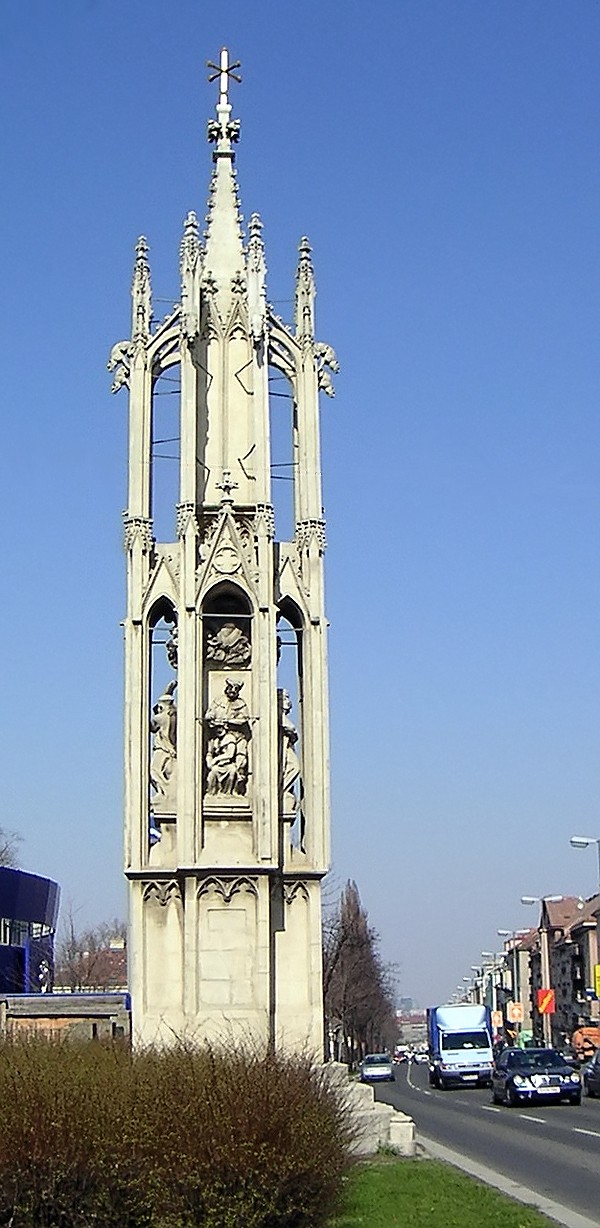
Vienna's Spinnerin am Kreuz (1375) is located in Favoriten, south of central Vienna.

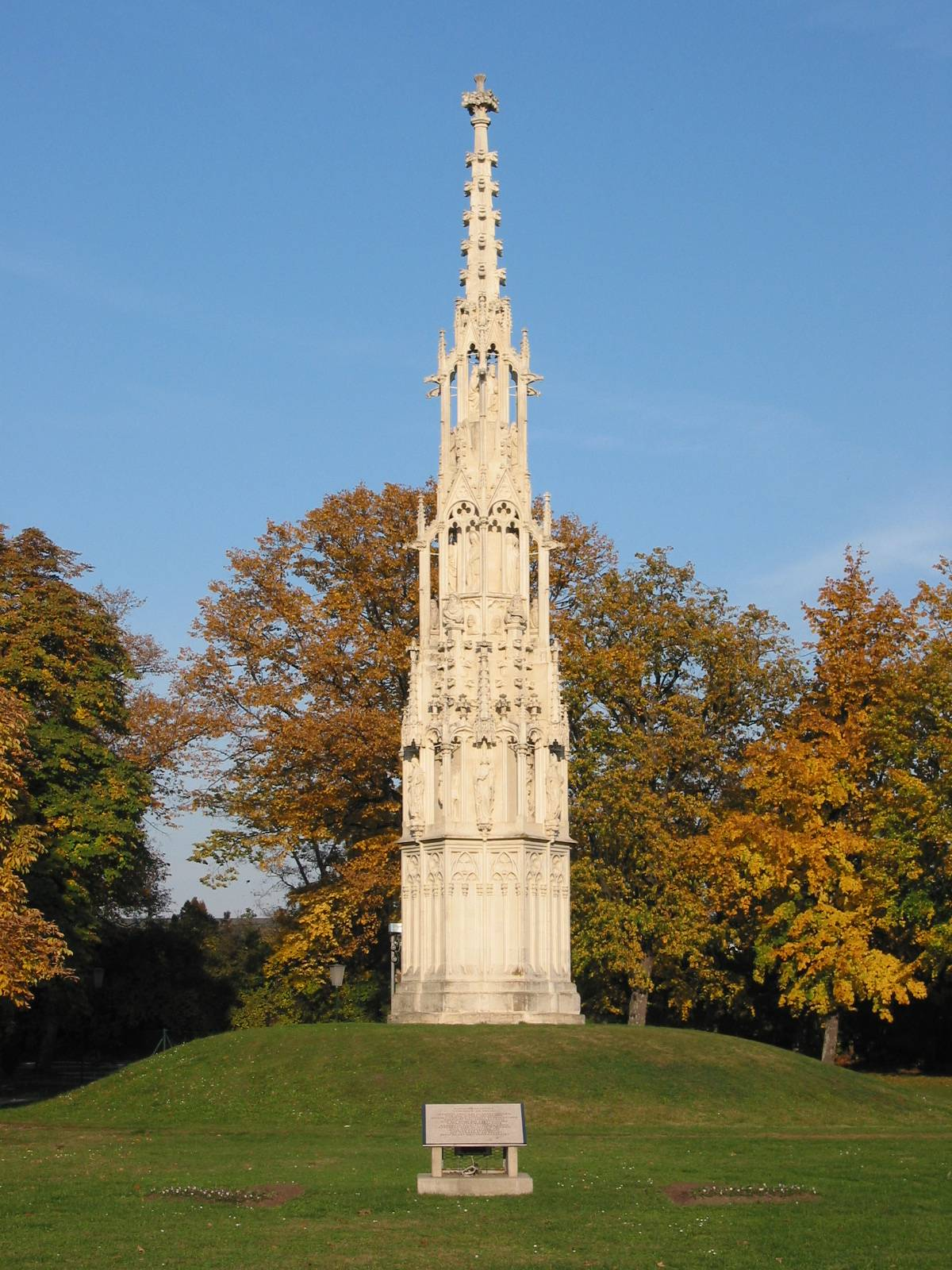
Wiener Neustadt's Spinnerin am Kreuz (1382-84) is located at the Wiener Tor.

The German name Spinnerin am Kreuz ("Spinner at the Cross") is the title given to two separate Austrian stone-tower sculptures (over 600 years old), one in Vienna and the other in the nearby city of Wiener Neustadt. They are related to the story of a wife spinning beside a cross. Both columns had been designed originally by Meister Michael Knab:

- in Vienna, the stone tower was built in 1375, rebuilt c.1452;
- in Wiener Neustadt, the stone tower was built in 1382-84.

Both stone-towers were rebuilt or renovated to survive into the 21st century.

== Stone tower in Vienna ==
The first Spinnerin am Kreuz is located in Vienna's 10th district (Favoriten), as a legendary old landmark on Wienerberg hill. It was erected in 1375, according to plans by stonemason Meister Michael Knab, but was temporarily destroyed in 1446. Five years later, in 1451/52 (?), it was re-erected in a new design, still using the old foundations, by Hans Puchsbaum. (He also designed the short spire on Stephansdom cathedral.) The purpose of this limestone pillar was to mark the southern border of Vienna and also provide a navigational landmark for faring folk. Before the limestone bildstock was created, a wooden column had stood at this site, first mentioned in a document from 1296.

The stone tower is a tall yet elaborately structured tabernacle pillar on an octagonal cross-shaped floor plan. The tower is decorated with pinnacles plus baldachins, with groups of figures in the baldachins (The Crucifixion, The Scourging Of Christ, Christ Crowned With Thorns, Ecce Homo). The general area of Wienerberg hill had been used as a place of execution (mostly by hanging) until the year 1747 and during 1804-1868. The Vienna tower has been restored or renovated several times.

== Stone tower in Wiener Neustadt ==
The second Spinnerin am Kreuz is located in the city of Wiener Neustadt (Austria), some distance south of Vienna. The 2nd stone-tower was erected by Meister M. Knab (who designed the first tower), outside of the town (in front of the Wiener Tor gate), during 1382-1384. The tower is 21 m (69 ft) high, consisting of four tapering elements, and richly ornamented with figures. Among the figures are statues of saints, reliefs depicting scenes about the Passion of Christ, and coats of arms. Other figures are relief busts of the master builder and the founder, plus their wives.

== Story of the spinning wife ==
There is a well-known legend that relates the tale of the Spinnerin am Kreuz:

A merchant's wife, after he had left for a Holy Land Crusade, had come to the site every day to sit by a cross and work with her spinning wheel, while waiting for her husband to return. As she sat at the cross and prayed for her husband's safety, she also promised to use the money she earned, by spinning wool, to donate a piety column (a Bildstock).

Long after the crusade had ended, her husband had not returned to Vienna. Everyone advised the woman to forget about the man and marry again; however, the faithful wife continued to spin at the cross, and waited until, finally, one day her husband actually did return. In gratitude, the couple endowed the building of the Spinnerin am Kreuz to thank God for the husband's safe return.

In modern times, both towers bear the name Spinnerin am Kreuz and were built within 9 years of each other.

== See also ==
- The Crusades
