= Carl Weissner =

German writer and translator

Carl Weissner (19 June 1940, Karlsruhe – 24 January 2012, Mannheim) was a German writer and translator.

== Biography ==
Weissner studied English language and literature in Bonn and Heidelberg. From 1965 to 1967 he published a literary magazine in Heidelberg, Klactoveedsedsteen. From 1970 to 1971 he published the magazine UFO with Jörg Fauser, Jürgen Ploog, and Udo Breger and starting in 1972 the literary magazine Gasolin 23 with Fauser and graphic artists Walter Hartmann and Ploog. In 1966 he left for New York City, where he spent two years on a Fulbright scholarship and developed close relationships with members of the Beat Generation, learning cut-up technique. He published a collaboration with William S. Burroughs and Claude Pélieu, So Who Owns Death TV, in Mary Beach's Beach Books Texts & Documents. He also published two texts with Jan Herman's Nova Broadcast Press.

Weissner's translations included Andy Warhol's A and J. G. Ballard's Liebe + Napalm = Export USA, for Udo Breger's Expanded Media Editions, works by Mary Beach, Claude Pelieu, Charles Plymell and Allen Ginsberg, and Harold Norses Beat Hotel. He achieved recognition by translating William S. Burroughs, Nelson Algren, and Charles Bukowski. Weissner and Bukowski were friends, and he helped establish Bukowski's reputation in Germany; years later he read from Bukowski's letters to German audiences. He also translated songs by Bob Dylan and Frank Zappa.

Weissner's archives are held in the German Literary Archive in Marbach am Neckar, with selections on display in the permanent exhibition of the Literaturmuseum der Moderne, also in Marbach.

== Books ==
- So Who Owns Death TV, Beach Books Texts & Documents, San Francisco 1967 (with William S. Burroughs and Claude Pelieu). Published in German as Fernseh-Tuberkulose, Nova Press, Frankfurt am Main 1969
- The Braille Film, Nova Broadcast Press, San Francisco 1970 (with contributions by W. S. Burroughs)
- The Louis Project, The Nova Broadcast Press, San Francisco, 1970 (with Jan Herman)
- Cut Up or Shut Up, Agentzia, Paris, 1972 (with Jan Herman and Jürgen Ploog, "ticker tape" introduction by W. S. Burroughs).
- Burroughs, Berlin 1994 (with Michael Köhler)
- Death in Paris. Online document, dated 7 December 2007, Reality Studio blog.
- Manhattan Muffdiver, Milena, Vienna 2010
- Die Abenteuer von Trashman, Milena, Vienna 2011 (with an afterword by Thomas Ballhausen)
- Eine andere Liga, Milena, Vienna 2013 (ed. Matthias Penzel and Vanessa Wieser)

== Translations ==
- Mary Beach: Die elektrische Banane. In: Renate Matthaei (ed.): März Texte 1 & Trivialmythen. Area, Erftstadt 2004 ISBN 3-89996-029-7, pp. 32–43.
- William S. Burroughs: Die Zukunft des Romans. Rede auf der Writers’ Conference Edinburgh 1964. Aus dem Amerik. Ibid., pp. 147–149.
- James Graham Ballard: Liebe & Napalm. Joseph Melzer, 1970. Original 1969.
  - Reissued as Liebe und Napalm. The Atrocity Exhibition. Milena, Vienna 2008. Foreword by Thomas Ballhausen and Thomas Edlinger. ISBN 3-85286-166-7.
  - Selection: Liebe & Napalm = Export USA. In: Klacto/23, Heidelberg 1967. Republished in: März Texte 1, März, Frankfurt 1969. Repr. in: März-Texte 1 und Trivialmythen. Area, Erftstadt 2004 ISBN 3-89996-029-7, S. 68–71.
- with Walter Hartmann: Songtexte 1962–1985. Bob Dylan. Zweitausendundeins, Frankfurt am Main 1975.

== Radio plays ==
- Der nackte Astronaut. With Christian Brückner, Günther Hoffmann, Matthias Ponnier, Margot Leonard u. a. Westdeutscher Rundfunk, 1972.
- Deadline USA. Eine Dokumentar-Show aus dem Underground-Museum der (19)60er Jahre. With William Burroughs, Allen Ginsberg, Janis Joplin, The Fugs, Jim Lowell, Harold Norse and many others. Co-production of Hessischer Rundfunk (HR) Frankfurt and Westdeutscher Rundfunk (WDR) Cologne. First broadcast: 8 November 1973. Directed by Hermann Naber.
- Die von der Reservebank oder Wenn wir drankommen, ist das Spiel hoffentlich verloren (director) by Broder Boyksen und Jörg Fauser; Saarländischer Rundfunk, 1974.
