= Richard Weihe =

Swiss writer

Richard Weihe is a Swiss author who writes mainly in the German language. He was educated in Zürich and Oxford. He is mainly known for biographical works of artists, including the novel Meer der Tusche (2005) on the life of Bada Shanren and Der Milchozean (2010) based on Amrita Sher-Gil. Meer der Tusche won the Prix des Auditeurs de la Radio Suisse Romande and has been translated into English by Jamie Bulloch for Peirene Press.
