= Karl Svoboda (politician) =

Austrian politician (1929–2022)

Member of the Municipal Council and Landtag of Vienna
- In office 25 June 1979 – 29 November 1996
- Constituency: Favoriten

Personal details
- Born: 23 November 1929 Vienna, Austria
- Died: 1 November 2022 (aged 92)
- Party: Social Democratic Party of Austria

Karl Svoboda (23 November 1929 – 1 November 2022) was an Austrian politician who served in the Municipal Council and Landtag of Vienna from 1979 until 1996 as a member of the Social Democratic Party of Austria.

== Biography ==
Karl Svoboda was born on 23 November 1929 in Vienna, Austria. Svoboda was trained as a civil engineer. In 1973, he joined the Social Democratic Party of Austria (SPÖ), becoming active in his home district of Favoriten, where he served on its district council from 1978 to 1979. In the 1979 Austrian legislative election, Svoboda was elected to the Municipal Council and Landtag of Vienna, representing Favoriten. During his tenure, Svoboda primarily focused on issues of transportation, urban planning, and social policy. In 1995, he was the Viennese representative to the Council of European Municipalities and Regions. Svoboda left the Municipal Council/Landtag on 29 November 1996. Svoboda also served as chairman of the SPÖ in the Municipal Council/Landtag from 22 June 1988 until he left office in 1996.

After leaving office, Svoboda remained socially involved. He was active in the Volkshilfe branch in Vienna, and helped found the Fortuna Park Palace at Altmannsdorf Castle in the Meidling district. In 1998, he was also a member of an advisory committee for the Czech ethnic group to the National Council of Austria. The following year, he was awarded the Grand Decoration of Honor in Gold for Services to the State of Vienna for his services to the state.

Svoboda died on 1 November 2022, at age 92. Following his death, Michael Ludwig, the mayor of Vienna, stated that Svoboda was "a connecting force [who] steered the fortunes of the SPÖ municipal club for many years", while the Workers' Samaritan Federation of Austria stated that he was a "fighter for humanity and social justice, solidarity and cohesion".
