= Neulandschule Laaerberg =

Coordinates: 48.1595°N 16.3890°E

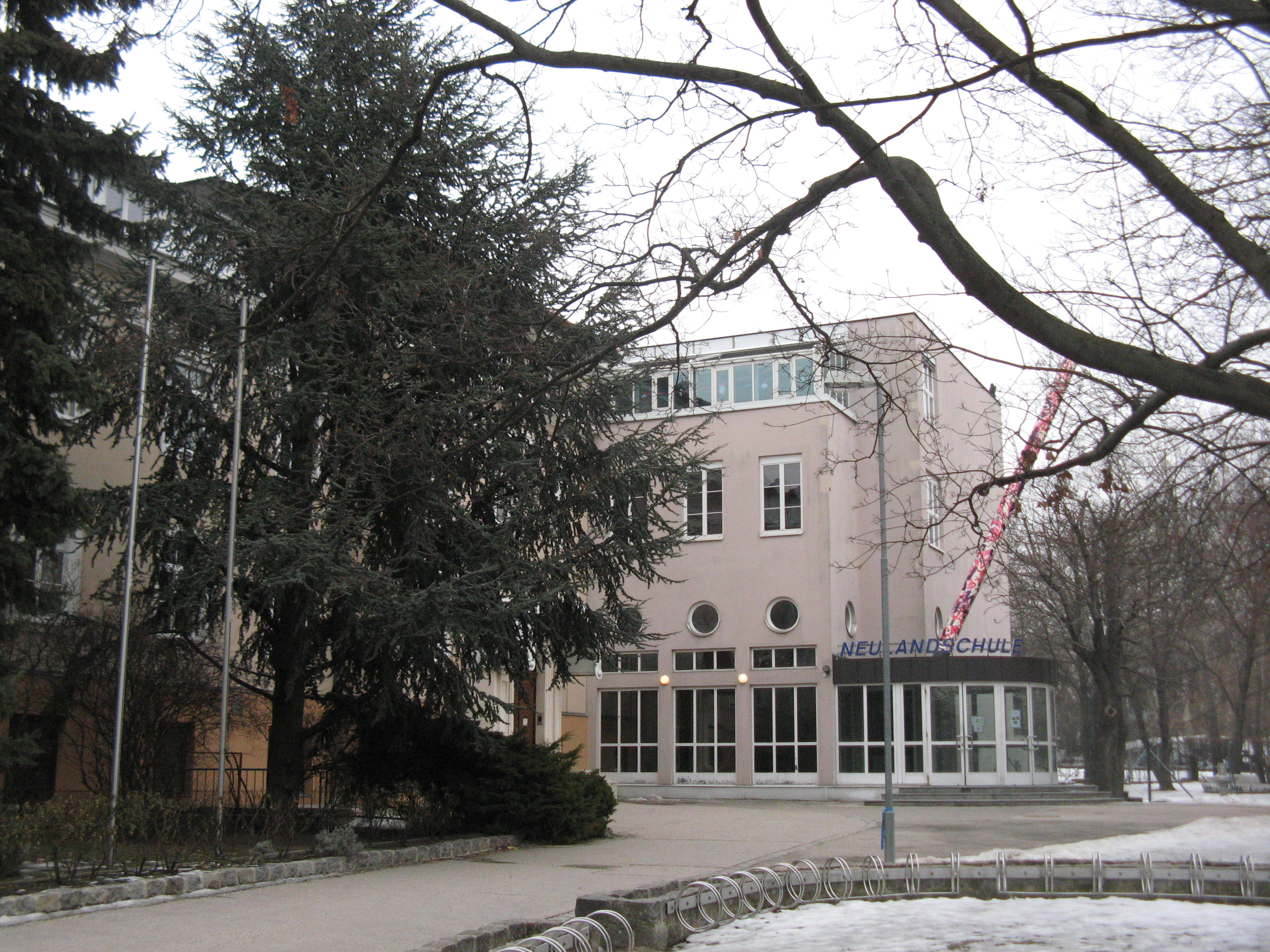
- Vienna; Austria

Information
- Type: Private
- Grades: 1-12
- Campus: Suburban
- Website: Neulandschule

Neulandschule Laaerberg is one of the schools of the Neulandschule Institut of the Austrian catholic Neuland movement. It is located in the Ludwig-von-Höhnel-Gasse 17-19 in the 10th district of Vienna, Austria. The school includes a primary school, a secondary school, a high school, a music school and a day-care center.

== History ==
In 1947 the so-called "Neulandschulsiedlung" rented the war-damaged former monastery building of the Eucharist and began with the reconstruction of the building. The former convent was set up as a boarding school and pupils could go to schools in Vienna from there. Director Edward Eduard Foltin started in 1948 with two classes of a Volksschule as an extension to the Neulandschule Grinzing. Together with director Josef Reichard, a secondary school was established in 1950. From 1952 to 1954 Villa Mendelssohn was rented as a summer school and for schoolchildren in Rindbach in Ebensee. From 1954 to 1964 the former hotel Bauer in Bad Ischl was rented as a school and boarding school building with a large park area, in which classes of elementary and middle school was led. In 1950, Director Fritz Hamp founded a higher standard of middle school with an undergraduate as an expatriate in Bad Ischl and the high school as a superstructure at Laaerberg. From 1967 onwards, the middle school was gradually abandoned and the higher standard of middle school at Laaerberg was built instead. From 1959 onwards, land was purchased and the former Eucharistic monastery was bought in 1972.

From 1972 to 1974, the school was expanded.

== Facilities ==
The school is divided into 4 main wings. A primary and secondary area, an administrative wing and a church. The school also has an outdoor ecology area. Facilities include five gyms, a kitchen, well-stocked libraries, numerous computer labs and a wireless network to support work on laptops for secondary students, kitchen, canteen, leisure areas, playgrounds, and sports areas.
