= Open system =

Open system may refer to:

== Technical term ==
- Open system (computing), one of a class of computers and associated software that provides some combination of interoperability, portability and open software standards, particularly Unix and Unix-like systems
- Open system (systems theory), in the natural and social sciences, a process that exchanges material, energy, people, capital or information with its environment
- Open system (thermodynamics), in thermodynamics and physics, a system where matter and energy can enter or leave, in contrast to a closed system where energy can enter or leave but matter can not
- Open system (control theory), a feedforward system that does not have any feedback loop to control its output in a control system
- Open system, in management science a system that is capable of self-maintenance on the basis of throughput of resources from the environment
- Open system of learning, where information is sourced from multiple sources
- Open government, system
- Open-system environment reference model, one of the first reference models for enterprise architecture
- Open Distribution system (Example: Peer-to-peer file sharing system)

== Proper name ==
- Open Systems Interconnection (IT company)
- Open Systems Accounting Software (product), an accounting and business software
- Open Systems International, supplier of open automation solutions for utilities in the electric, oil & gas, transport, and water industries
- Open-source software, system (product)
- Open publication, system (non-standard term)

The system in which the exchange of both mass and energy take place through surrounding environment
