= Closed circuit =

Closed circuit can refer to:

- Closed-circuit television
- Closed-circuit radio
- Closed circuit breathing apparatus, commonly known as rebreathers for portable units, and as component parts of life-support systems for more complex equipment.
- Closed Circuit (1978 film), a 1978 Italian film
- Closed Circuit (2013 film), a 2013 British thriller film
- An electric circuit is a "closed circuit" if it contains a complete path between the positive and negative terminals of its power source
- Closed Circuit (album), a 2001 album by New Zealand composer Peter Jefferies
- The Closed Circuit, a 2013 Polish action film directed by Ryszard Bugajski
