= Come, Sweet Death (novel) =

1998 novel by Wolf Haas

- Cover of the original German edition
- Author: Wolf Haas
- Original title: Komm, süßer Tod
- Language: German
- Genre: Novel
- Publisher: Rowohlt Taschenbuch Verlag
- Publication date: 31 March 1998
- Publication place: Austria
- Media type: Print (Paperback)
- ISBN: 3-499-22814-9

Come, Sweet Death (German: Komm, süßer Tod) is a 1998 novel by Austrian author Wolf Haas. It is named after a musical piece by Johann Sebastian Bach. It was adapted for film in 2000 as Come, Sweet Death.

== Plot summary ==
Disillusioned paramedic and ex-cop Simon Brenner finds himself trapped between the front lines of two competing Emergency Medical Services in Vienna's relentless summer heat. Things turn really hot when Brenner starts looking into the unusually high death rate of elderly patients.

== Characters ==
- Simon Brenner – ex police officer, main protagonist
