= Raw Material (novel) =

1984 novel by Jörg Fauser

- Author: Jörg Fauser
- Original title: Rohstoff
- Translator: Jamie Bulloch
- Language: German
- Genre: autobiographical novel
- Publisher: Ullstein Verlag
- Publication date: 1984
- Publication place: West Germany
- English publication date: 2014
- Pages: 218
- ISBN: 3550064780

Raw Material (German: Rohstoff) is a 1984 autobiographical novel by the German writer Jörg Fauser. Set in the 1960s, it follows the author's alter ego Harry Gelb as he lives as a heroin addict in Istanbul, as an alcoholic, menial worker and struggling writer in a Berlin commune, and as a squatter in Frankfurt. Gelb rejects everything he regards as insipid, hierarchical and doctrinaire, whether it is mainstream culture or left-wing revolutionary groups.

Fauser and Raw Material developed a cult following in Germany. The book has been compared to American beat literature and the works of Charles Bukowski. It was published in Jamie Bulloch's English translation in 2014.
