= Silentium (film) =

- Directed by: Wolfgang Murnberger
- Starring: Josef Hader; Simon Schwarz; Joachim Król
- Release date: 24 September 2004
- Running time: 116 min
- Country: Austria
- Language: German

Silentium is a 2004 Austrian film based on a novel by Wolf Haas.

== Cast ==
- Josef Hader - Simon Brenner
- Simon Schwarz - Berti
- Joachim Król - Sportpräfekt Fitz
- Maria Köstlinger - Konstanze Dornhelm
- Udo Samel - Festspielpräsident
- Tini Kainrath - Opernsängerin
- Jürgen Tarrach - Opernsänger
