= Come, Sweet Death (film) =

- DVD Cover
- Directed by: Wolfgang Murnberger
- Written by: Wolf Haas; Josef Hader; Wolfgang Murnberger
- Based on: Come, Sweet Death by Wolf Haas
- Produced by: Danny Krausz; Kurt Stocker
- Starring: Josef Hader; Simon Schwarz; Barbara Rudnik; Michael Schönborn; Bernd Michael Lade; Nina Proll; Karl Markovics; Reinhard Nowak
- Edited by: Evi Romen
- Music by: Sofa Surfers
- Distributed by: DOR Film
- Release date: 22 December 2000
- Running time: 104 minutes
- Country: Austria
- Language: Viennese German
- Box office: 232,009 admissions (Austria)

Come, Sweet Death (German: Komm, süßer Tod) is a 2000 Austrian darkly humorous crime film based on the novel of the same name by Wolf Haas. It is one of the Brenner detective stories, which tell of the luckless life of ex-policeman and unsuccessful private investigator Simon Brenner, who tramps throughout Austria and stumbles upon difficult crime cases. Brenner is portrayed by one of Austria's most famous comedians, Josef Hader. The film won the Romy Award for being the most successful Austrian movie of 2001.

== Plot ==
Former police officer and luckless private investigator Simon Brenner has become an emergency medical technician, having been fired from the police force because he slept with his boss's wife. He only wants to keep out of trouble and keep a steady job for a while, but finds himself caught up in a war between two rival EMS organizations.

Brenner is dragged back into his old detective life when a well-known nurse falls victim to a double murder in a hospital. The weary Brenner does not care, but his young and idealistic EMS partner Berti is eager to investigate. Soon after this another murder occurs — this time a fellow paramedic is the victim.

Brenner finally realizes that he has to solve this case, if only to return to his quiet and blissfully uneventful life of late. Slowly but stubbornly plodding along, he uncovers the ugly truth as he is confronted with the bitter war between rival ambulance companies.

== Cast ==
- Josef Hader as Simon Brenner
- Simon Schwarz as Berti
- Barbara Rudnik as Klara
- Michael Schönborn as Junior
- Bernd Michael Lade as Gross, "Piefke"
- Nina Proll as Angelika Lanz
- Karl Markovics as Jäger
- Reinhard Nowak as Hansi Munz

== Production ==
Come, Sweet Death was produced by DOR Film, Österreichisches Filminstitut and ORF.

== Reception ==
The film opened on 50 screens, large for Austria. It became the fourth-highest-grossing film in Austria of all time with admissions of 232,009.
