= Short Circuit (Haas novel) =

2025 novel by Wolf Haas

- Author: Wolf Haas
- Original title: Wackelkontakt
- Translator: Jamie Bulloch
- Language: German
- Publisher: Carl Hanser Verlag
- Publication date: 9 January 2025
- Publication place: Germany
- English publication date: 11 April 2026
- Pages: 240
- ISBN: 978-3-446-28272-8

Short Circuit (German: Wackelkontakt) is a 2025 novel by the Austrian writer Wolf Haas. It follows two parallel characters, an Austrian waiting for an electrician to repair his power outlet and an incarcerated Italian mafia member who fears he will be murdered in his cell, who are reading books about the other character's current situation. The story's structure was inspired by the graphic designs of M. C. Escher.

An English translation by Jamie Bulloch was published by HarperVia in 2026. Publishers Weekly called the book "a clever, wryly funny ride".
