= List of Austrian films of the 2000s =

A list of films produced in the Cinema of Austria in the 2000s decade ordered by year of release. For an alphabetical list of articles on Austrian films see Category:Austrian films.

In cases of international co-productions, films in the making of which an Austrian studio was the majority partner (with a foreign film studio as a co-producer with a minority interest) are indicated by "(maj.)" in the "Notes" column. Films in the making of which an Austrian studio was the minority partner (with a foreign film studio as a co-producer with a majority interest) are indicated by "(min.)" in the "Notes" column.

The dates in parentheses are the start dates of film runs in Austrian cinemas.

== 2000–2003 ==
Title	Director	Cast	Genre	Studio/Notes
2000
Hold-Up	Florian Flicker	Roland Düringer, Josef Hader, Joachim Bißmeier, Birgit Doll	Black comedy	
2001
Dog Days	Ulrich Seidl	Maria Hofstätter		
Copy Shop	Virgil Widrich		short	Virgil Widrich Film- und Multimediaproduktion
Elsewhere	Nikolaus Geyrhalter	–	documentary	Nikolaus Geyrhalter Filmproduktion (May 31)
The Piano Teacher	Michael Haneke	Isabelle Huppert, Benoît Magimel, Annie Girardot	feature film	Won 3 awards at Cannes
Lovely Rita	Jessica Hausner			Screened at the 2001 Cannes Film Festival
2002
Blue Moon	Andrea Maria Dusl	Josef Hader, Victoria Malektorovych, Detlev Buck		
Everyman's Feast (Jedermanns Fest)	Fritz Lehner	Klaus Maria Brandauer		Wega Film, entered into the 24th Moscow International Film Festival
Foreigners out! Schlingensiefs Container (Ausländer raus!)	Paul Poet	Christoph Schlingensief, Elfriede Jelinek, Paulus Manker, Daniel Cohn-Bendit	documentary	Bonus Film
Gebürtig	Robert Schindel, Lukas Stepanik	Peter Simonischek, Ruth Rieser, August Zirner, Daniel Olbrychski	feature	
Nogo	Sabine Hiebler, Gerhard Ertl	Jürgen Vogel, Meret Becker, Jasmin Tabatabai, Mavie Hörbiger, Michael Ostrowski, Oliver Korittke	feature film	Dor Film
She, Me & Her	Reinhard Schwabenitzky	Ben Cross, Sandra Pires, Elfi Eschke	feature	George Linder
2003
Dead Man's Memories (Der gläserne Blick)	Markus Heltschl	Sylvie Testud, Miguel Guilherme		
Free Radicals (Böse Zellen)	Barbara Albert			coop99
Fast Film	Virgil Widrich		short	Virgil Widrich FIlm- und Multimediaproduktion
Struggle	Ruth Mader			Screened at the 2003 Cannes Film Festival
Yu	Franz Novotny			Entered into the 25th Moscow International Film Festival

== 2004 ==
In 2004, 24 Austrian films were produced either as solely Austrian productions, or with an Austrian majority interest and opened in the cinemas. 16 were feature films and 8 were documentary films. A further 8 films were produced with an Austrian minority production interest, 7 of them feature films: for example Michael Haneke's Wolfzeit, which is a predominantly French production.

Title	Director	Cast	Genre	Studio/Notes
Time of the Wolf (Wolfzeit)	Michael Haneke	Isabelle Huppert, Béatrice Dalle, Patrice Chéreau	feature film	Wega Film (min.), screened at Cannes
The Edukators (Die fetten Jahre sind vorbei)	Hans Weingartner	Daniel Brühl, Julia Jentsch	comedy	coop99 (min.), Y3 Film (Germany, Hans Weingartner's film company in Berlin). Screened at Cannes.
Darwin's Nightmare	Hubert Sauper		documentary	coop99
Villa Henriette	Peter Payer	Hannah Tiefengraber, Cornelia Froboess	children's film	
Nacktschnecken	Michael Glawogger	Raimund Wallisch, Michael Ostrowski, Pia Hierzegger	comedy	Dor Film
handbikemovie	Martin Bruch		documentary	Satel Film
Das wirst du nie verstehen	Anja Salomonowitz		documentary	Wiener Filmakademie
Info Wars	Sebastian J. F.		documentary	Parallel Universe
C(r)ook	Pepe Danquart	Henry Hübchen, Moritz Bleibtreu, Roland Düringer	feature	Dor Film (maj.)
Antares	Götz Spielmann	Petra Morzé, Andreas Patton	feature	Lotus Film
No Rest for the Brave	Alain Guiraudie	Thomas Suire, Thomas Blanchard	feature	Amour Fou Filmproduktion
Hotel	Jessica Hausner	Franziska Weisz		Screened at the 2004 Cannes Film Festival
Silentium	Wolfgang Murnberger	Josef Hader, Simon Schwarz, Joachim Król		

== 2005 ==
In 2005, 24 Austrian films were produced either as solely Austrian productions, or with an Austrian majority interest and opened in the cinemas. 15 of them were documentary films, and nine were feature films. A further six films (three documentary films and three feature films) were produced with an Austrian minority interest co-production partner – for example, the award-winning documentary Darwin's Nightmare, a production with a majority French interest.

Title	Director	Cast	Genre	Studio/Notes
The Vulture Wally (Die Geierwally)	Peter Sämann	Christine Neubauer	drama	Wega Film (premiere: January 7)
Erik(A)	Kurt Mayer	–	documentary	Kurt Mayer Film (January 14)
Things – Places – Years	Klub Zwei (Simone Bader & Jo Schneiser)	–	documentary	Amour Fou Filmproduktion (January 20)
Der Wadenmesser	Kurt Palm	–	documentary	Fischer Film (January 28)
Küss mich, Prinzessin	Michael Grimm	Stefano Bernardin, Isabella Campestrini, Hilde Dalik	feature	Josef Aichholzer Film (February 24)
Die Viertelliterklasse	Florian Kehrer, Roland Düringer	Roland Düringer, Eva Billisich, Murali Perumal	comedy	Luna Film (March 4)
Accordion Tribe	Stefan Schwietert	about the group Accordion Tribe	documentary	Fischer Film (min.) (March 4)
Welcome Home	Andreas Gruber	Emmanuel Abankwa, Joseph Allruist Win, Fred Nii Amugi	feature	Wega Film (maj.) (March 18), entered into the 27th Moscow International Film Festival
Welt Spiegel Kino	Gustav Deutsch	–	documentary	Loop Media (April 1)
Blackout Journey	Sigfried Kamml	Marek Harloff, Mavie Hörbiger, Arno Frisch	feature	Epo Film (maj.)) (April 14)
Dallas Pashamende	Robert Adrian Pejo	–	documentary	Allegro Film (min.) (April 15)
I am from Nowhere	Georg Misch	–	documentary	Navigator Film (maj.) (May 18)
Augenleuchten	Wolfram Paulus	Dominik Leeb, Andreas Puehringer, Nadja Vogel	feature	(May 19)
Über die Grenze	P. Łoziński, P. Kerekes, B. Čakič-Veselič, J. Gogola, R. Lakatos		documentary	Geyrhalter Film (May 20)
Schläfer	Benjamin Heisenberg	Bastian Trost, Mehdi Nebbou, Loretta Pflaum	feature	coop99 (min.) (June 3), screened at Cannes
F.A.Q – Frequently Asked Questions	Stefan Hafner, Alexander Binder	–	documentary	Meter Film (June 24)
Backstage 1955	Kurt Mündl	–	documentary	Power of Earth (September 12)
Ragin	Kirill Serebrennikov	Zoya Buryak, Aleksandr Galibin	feature	Dor Film (min.) (September 23), Russian film
Operation Spring	Angelika Schuster, Tristan Sindelgruber	–	documentary	Schnittpunkt Film (September 23)
We Feed the World	Erwin Wagenhofer	–	documentary	Allegro Film (September 30)
Artikel 7 – Unser Recht	Thomas Korschil, Eva Simmler	–	documentary	Navigator Film (maj.) (September 30)
Die Jungen von der Paulstrasse	Maurizio Zaccaro	Gáspár Mesés, Nancy Brilli, Mario Adorf, Virna Lisi	feature	Lisa Film (July 10), originally produced for broadcasting in Italian TV in 2003
Unterwegs nach Heimat	Barbara Gräftner	–	documentary	Bonus Film, zeggl Film (November 11)
Crash Test Dummies	Jörg Kalt	Maria Popistașu, Bogdan Dumitrache, Simon Schwarz	feature	Amour Fou Filmproduktion (maj.) (November 11)
Donauleichen	Peter Kern	Christian Blümel, Hilde Dalik	feature	Alma Donau Film (November 18)
Caché (UK: Hidden)	Michael Haneke	Juliette Binoche, Daniel Auteuil, Maurice Bénichou	Thriller	Wega Film (min.) (November 18) Best Director at Cannes
Schnelles Geld	Sabine Derflinger	–	documentary	Bernhard Pötscher Film (November 18)
Workingman's Death	Michael Glawogger	–	documentary	Lotus Film (maj.) (November 25)
Tibet Revisited	Manfred Neuwirth	–	documentary	Loop Media (December 2)

== 2006 ==
In 2006, 34 Austrian films were produced and opened in the cinemas. All of them were either solely Austrian productions, or had an Austrian majority interest. 17 of them were documentary films and 16 were feature films.

Title	Director	Cast	Genre	Studio/Notes
The Headsman (Henker)	Simon Aeby	Steven Berkoff, Nikolaj Coster-Waldau, Julie Cox	drama	Allegro Film (maj.) (Austrian cinema premiere: January 20)
You Bet Your Life (Spiele Leben)	Antonin Svoboda	Georg Friedrich, Birgit Minichmayr	Thriller	coop99 (maj.) (January 20)
Volver la Vista – der umgekehrte Blick	Fridolin Schönwiese	–	documentary	Amour Fou Filmproduktion (maj.) (January 20)
Jenseits	Stefan Müller	Philipp Hezoucky, Christine Artner, Matthias Hoffmann	fantasy	Verein Loom (January 21), digital movie
New World (Neue Welt)	Paul Rosdy	–	documentary	Paul Rosdy Film (January 27)
Grbavica	Jasmila Žbanić	Mirjana Karanović, Luna Mijovic, Leon Lucev	feature	coop99 (maj.) (March ^{3rd})
Klimt	Raúl Ruiz	John Malkovich, Veronica Ferres	feature	Epo Film (maj.) (March ^{3rd})
Meisterschaft	Friedemann Derschmidt	–	documentary	Friedemann Derschmidt (March 31), Video production with cinema premiere
Octopusalarm (Tintenfischalarm)	Elisabeth Scharang	Alex Jurgen	documentary	Wega Film (April 7)
No Name City	Florian Flicker, Georg Misch	–	documentary	Mischief Films (April 21)
Our Daily Bread (Unser täglich Brot)	Nikolaus Geyrhalter	–	documentary	Geyrhalter Film (April 21)
Feine Dame	Xaver Schwarzenberger	Aglaia Szyszkowitz, Julia Stemberger, Harald Krassnitzer	comedy	MR Film (April 23)
Kotsch	Helmut Köpping	Christoph Theußl, Andreas Kiendl, Michael Ostrowski	feature	Lotus Film (April 28)
The Crown Prince	Robert Dornhelm	Max von Thun, Vittoria Puccini, Klaus Maria Brandauer, Christian Clavier, Omar Sharif		MR Film (April 30)
Calling Hedy Lamarr	Georg Misch	–	documentary	Mischief Films (maj.) (May 12)
Nitro	Mike Majzen, David Schalko	Jumbo Schreiner	comedy	Dor Film (May 19)
Out of Hand (Keller – Teenage Wasteland)	Eva Urthaler	Elisabetta Rocchetti, Ludwig Trepte, Sergej Moya, Georg Friedrich, Birgit Doll	drama	Novotny und Novotny Film (maj.) (June 9)
Silent Bloodnight	Elmar Weihsmann, Stefan Peczelt	Monica Baci, Robert Cleaner, Christine Dune	horror	Tigerline Film (July 7)
Snow White	Samir, Michael Sauter	Julie Fournier, Carlos Leal, Zoé Mikuleczky	feature	Filmhaus (maj.) (September 1)
Falling (Fallen)	Barbara Albert	Nina Proll, Birgit Minichmayr, Ursula Strauss	drama	coop99 (September 8)
Friendship (Freundschaft)	Rupert Henning, Florian Scheuba	Erwin Steinhauer, Rupert Henning	comedy	Dor Film (September 15)
Dead in 3 Days (In 3 Tagen bist du tot)	Andreas Prochaska	Sabrina Reiter, Laurence Rupp	horror	Allegro Film (September 22)
Notes on Marie Menken	Martina Kudlácek	–	documentary	Mina Film (September 22)
Romane Apsa – Zigeunertränen	Zuzana Brechja	–	documentary	Fischer Film (September 27), digital film
Exile Family Movie	Arash T. Riahi	–	documentary	Golden Girls Film (September 29)
Ich erzähle dir von mir	Petra Hinterberger	–	documentary	Studio West (September 29)
Lapislauzi	Wolfgang Murnberger	Clarence John Ryan, Julia Krombach, Paula Nocker	Children's film	Dor Film (maj.) (October 6)
AINOA	Marco Kalantari	Gabriela Benesch, Maria Bill, Verena Buratti	Science fiction film	Cinevista Film (October 19)
Karo and the Lord (Karo und der liebe Gott)	Danielle Proskar	Resi Reiner, Petra Morzé, Markus Gertken	children's film	Mini Film (November 2)
Zeit zu gehen	Anita Natmeßnig	–	documentary	Navigator Film (November 17)
Aufzeichnungen zum Widerstand	Martin Krenn	–	documentary	Amour Fou Filmproduktion (November 24)
Slumming	Michael Glawogger	Paulus Manker, August Diehl, Michael Ostrowski	feature	Lotus Film (maj.) (November 24)
Freuds verschwundene Nachbarn	Kurt Mayer	–	documentary	Kurt Mayer Film (December 1)
Babooska	Tizza Covi, Rainer Frimmel	–	documentary	Vento Film (maj.) (December 6)
Zorros Bar Mizwa	Ruth Beckermann	–	documentary	Ruth Beckermann Film (December 15)
Zen and Zero (Zen & Zero – An Austrian Surfextravaganza)	Michael Ginthoer	–	documentary	Philipp Manderla Film (December 29)

== 2007 ==
In 2007, 34 Austrian films (19 documentary films and 15 feature films, including the two feature films Winterreise and Deepfrozen, which are mentioned on the website of the Film Institute, but not in the Film Report) were first screened in Austrian cinemas, 25 of them either solely Austrian productions, or with an Austrian majority interest (the latter including 7 feature films). 9 films were produced with an Austrian studio as the minority co-production partner, 8 of them feature films – for example Hans Weingartner's Reclaim Your Brain, which is a production with a majority German interest.

Title	Director	Cast	Genre	Studio/Notes
5 Fabriken - Arbeiterkontrolle in Venezuela	Dario Azzellini, Oliver Ressler	–	documentary	Sixpack Film (maj.) (January 19)
Ich muss dir was sagen	Martin Nguyen	–	documentary	Mischief Films (January 19)
Rule of Law	Susanne Brandstätter	–	documentary	Josef Aichholzer Film (January 26)
Taxidermia	György Pálfi	Csaba Czene, Gergely Trócsányi	feature	Amour Fou Filmproduktion (min.) (February 9)
Winterreise	Hans Steinbichler	Josef Bierbichler, Sibel Kekilli	feature	Wega Film (February 23)
Über Wasser	Udo Maurer	–	documentary	Lotus Film (maj.) (February 23)
Forever Never Anywhere (Immer nie am Meer)	Antonin Svoboda	Dirk Stermann, Christoph Grissemann, Heinz Strunk	tragic comedy	coop99 (March 9)
To the Limit (Am Limit)	Pepe Danquart	–	documentary	Lotus Film (min.) (March 16)
Vienna's Lost Daughters (Wiens verlorene Töchter)	Mirjam Unger	–	documentary	Mobile Film (March 23)
The Counterfeiters (Die Fälscher)	Stefan Ruzowitzky	Karl Marcovics, August Diehl, Devid Striesow	historical drama	Josef Aichholzer Film (maj.) (March 23), won the Academy Award for Best Foreign Language Film 2008
Heile Welt	Jakob M. Erwa		feature	Novotny & Novotny Film (March 30)
42 Plus	Sabine Derflinger	Claudia Michelsen, Ulrich Tukur, Petra Morzé, Tobias Moretti	feature	Dor Film (April 13)
Life in Loops (A Megacities Remix)	Timo Novotny	–	film remix	Orbrock Film, Film in Loops (April 20)
Out of Time (Aus der Zeit)	Harald Friedl	–	documentary	Harald Friedl (May 4)
Almfilm	Gundula Daxecker	–	documentary	Geyrhalter Film (May 4)
Rumi – Poesi des Islam	Houchang Allahyari	–	documentary	Houchang Allahyari Film (May 10)
Children of the Prophet	Sudabeh Mortezai	–	documentary	Freibeuter Film (May 25)
Ma Mère	Christophe Honoré	Isabelle Huppert, Louis Garrel, Emma de Caunes	drama	Amour Fou Filmproduktion (min.) (July 20)
Gucha – Distant Trumpet (Guca!)	Dusan Milic	Mira Djurdjevic, Marko Jeremic, Aleksandra Manasijevic	comedy	Josef Aichholzer Film (min.) (August 24)
The Beheaded Rooster (Der geköpfte Hahn)	Radu Gabrea, Marijan Vajda	David Zimmerschied, Alicja Bachleda-Curus, Iona Teodora Iacob	drama	Epo Film (min.) (August 31)
Meine liebe Republik	Elisabeth Scharang	–	documentary	Wega Film (September 21)
Prater	Ulrike Ottinger	–	documentary	Kurt Mayer Film (maj.) (September 21)
No Island: The Palmers Kidnapping of 1977 (Keine Insel – Die Palmers-Entführung)	Alexander Binder	–	documentary	Enkidu Film (September 28)
Kurz davor ist es passiert	Anja Salomonowitz	–	documentary	Amour Fou Filmproduktion (October 5)
Midsummer Madness	Alexander Hahn	Maria de Medeiros, Dominique Pinon, Chulpan Khamatova, Tobias Moretti	comedy	Fischer Film (min.) (October 12)
Zurück zu einem unbekannten Anfang	Helmut Wimmer, Maria Hoppe	–	documentary	Österreichisches Institut für Validation (October 12)
The War on Drugs	Sebastian J. F.	–	documentary	Parallel Universe (October 12)
Import Export	Ulrich Seidl	Ekateryna Rak, Paul Hofmann, Michael Thomas, Maria Hofstätter, Georg Friedrich	drama	Ulrich Seidl Film (November 9). Entered into the 2007 Cannes Film Festival.
Jeder siebte Mensch	Elke Groen, Ina Ivanceanu	–	documentary	Virgil Widrich Film (November 16)
Reclaim Your Brain	Hans Weingartner	Moritz Bleibtreu, Elsa Schulz Gambard, Milan Peschel, Simone Hanselmann, Gregor Bloéb	comedy	coop99 (min.) (November 23)
Rumpelstilzchen	Andy Nissner	Katharina Thalbach	feature	SK Film (min.) (December 6)
Der Kärntner spricht deutsch	Andrina Mracnikar	–	documentary	Sixpack Film (December 7)
Hermes Phettberg – Elender	Kurt Palm	–	documentary	Fischer Film (December 7)
Deepfrozen	Andy Bausch	Peter Lohmeyer, Lale Yavas, Thierry Van Werveke	comedy	Wega Film (min.) (December 27)

== 2008 ==
In 2008, 33 Austrian films were first screened in Austrian cinemas (20 feature films, 13 documentary films), 28 of them either solely Austrian productions, or with an Austrian majority interest (source: Austrian Film Institute)

Title	Director	Cast	Genre	Studio/Notes
Bye Bye Blackbird	Robinson Savary	James Thiérrée, Derek Jacobi, Izabella Miko, Jodhi May, Michael Lonsdale	drama	Dor Film (min.) (January 4)
Hafner's Paradise (Hafners Paradies)	Günther Schwaiger	Paul Hafner	documentary	Günter Schwaiger Film Produktion (maj.) (January 11), about the old Nazi Hafner in his exile in Spain
The End of the Neubacher Project	Marcus J. Carney	–	documentary	Extra Film (January 18)
Free to Leave (Freigesprochen)	Peter Payer	Frank Giering, Lavinia Wilson, Corinna Harfouch, Robert Stadlober	drama	Lotus Film (maj.) (January 18), based on a novel by Ödön von Horváth
Falco – Verdammt, wir leben noch!	Thomas Roth	Manuel Rubey, Arno Frisch, Christian Tramitz	biographical film	MR Film (maj.) (February 7), about the Austrian Popstar Falco
Mozart in China	Bernd Neuburger	Kaspar Simonischek, Marco Yuan	family film	Extra Film (maj.) (February 29)
Einst süße Heimat	Gerald Igor Hauzenberger	–	documentary	Golden Girls Film (March 7)
Mister Karl. Karlheinz Böhm – Wut und Liebe	Kurt Mayer	–	documentary	Epo Film (maj.) (March 14)
Schindler's Houses (Schindlers Häuser)	Heinz Emigholz	–	documentary	Amour Fou Filmproduktion (April 4)
The Reason Why (Darum)	Harald Sicheritz	Kai Wiesinger, Anna Thalbach, Cornelius Obonya, Roland Düringer, Nadeshda Brennicke	drama	Allegro Film (April 4)
Ten: Umbra Mortis	Urs Egger	Tobias Moretti, Christoph Waltz, Steven Berkoff, Silke Bodenbender, Christian Redl	TV film thriller	Lisa Film (April 13)
Back to Africa	Othmar Schmiderer	–	documentary	Langbein & Skalnik Media (maj.) (April 25)
Grenzgängerinnen	Ülkü Akbaba			Ülkü Akbaba (April 25)
Jump!	Joshua Sinclair	Ben Silverstone, Patrick Swayze, Martine McCutcheon, Heinz Hoenig, Anja Kruse	drama, biographical film	LWB Media (maj.) (May 1)
Weltrevolution	Klaus Hundsbichler	–	documentary	Klaus Hundsbichler (May 9)
Revanche	Götz Spielmann	Johannes Krisch, Andreas Lust	Thriller	Prisma Film, Spielmann Film (May 16)
Nur kein Mitleid	Peter Kern			Kulturfabrik Austria (May 23)
Herzausreisser (Nua ka Schmoez!)	Karin Berger		documentary	Navigator Film (May 30)
Kleine Geheimnisse	Pol Cruchten			Amour Fou Filmproduktion (min.) (June 6)
Ein Rucksack voller Lügen	Wolfram Paulus			SK Film (June 6)
Spanking Devils	Elmar Weihsmann		feature	Tigerline Film (July 20)
Übermorgen Nirgendwo	Markus Stein			Lotus Film (min.) (August 1)
Silent Resident (Weisse Lilien)	Christian Frosch	Brigitte Hobmeier, Johanna Wokalek, Martin Wuttke		Amour Fou Film, KGP Production (maj.) (August 29)
Herrn Kukas Empfehlungen	Dariusz Gajewski		feature	Prisma Film (maj.) (September 5)
Kairo All Inclusive	Walter Größbauer		documentary	Fortuna Media (September 18)
La Bohème	Robert Dornhelm			MR Film (maj.) (October 10)
Schlimmer geht's nimmer	David Unger			David Unger Film (October 17)
North Face	Philipp Stölzl			Dor Film (min.) (October 24)
Let's Make Money	Erwin Wagenhofer		documentary	Allegro Film (October 31)
Tag der Teufel	n/a		feature	Tigerline Film (November 20)
In die Welt	Constantin Wulff		documentary	Navigator Film (November 21)
Loos Ornamental	Heinz Emigholz		documentary	Amour Fou / KGP Filmproduktion (November 21)
Echte Wiener	Kurt Ockermüller		comedy	Bonus Film (December 19)
Love Comes Lately	Jan Schütte	Otto Tausig, Rhea Perlman, Elizabeth Peña, Barbara Hershey	comedy	Dor Film (min.) (December 19)
In 3 Tagen bist du tot 2	Andreas Prochaska		horror film	Allegro Film (December 26)

== 2009 ==
In 2009, 34 Austrian films were first screened in Austrian cinemas (17 feature films, 17 documentary films), 28 of them either solely Austrian productions, or with an Austrian majority interest (source: Austrian Film Institute

Title	Director	Cast	Genre	Studio/Notes
Mein halbes Leben	Marko Doringer	–	documentary	Marko Doringer / Geyrhalter Film (maj.) (January 1)
For A Moment Freedom (Ein Augenblick Freiheit)	Arash T. Riahi	Navíd Akhavan, Pourya Mahyari, Elika Bozorgi	drama	Wega Film (maj.) (January 9)
Sneaker Stories	Katharina Weingartner	–	documentary	Pooldoks (January 16)
Lilly the Witch: The Dragon and the Magic Book (Hexe Lilli)	Stefan Ruzowitzky	Alina Freund, Michael Mittermeier	animation	Dor Film (min.) (February 19)
Film ist. a girl & a gun	Gustav Deutsch	–	documentary	Loop Media (maj.) (February 27)
Der Knochenmann	Wolfgang Murnberger	Josef Hader, Josef Bierbichler, Birgit Minichmayr	crime, comedy	Dor Film (March 6)
7915 km	Nikolaus Geyrhalter	–	documentary	Geyrhalter Film (March 20)
Kleine Fische	Marco Antoniazzi	Michael Steinocher, Volker Schmidt, Sabrina Reite	comedy	Novotny & Novotny (March 20)
Gangster Girls	Tina Leisch	–	documentary	kinoki, witcraft (March 27)
Universalove	Thomas Woschitz	Stefan Arsenijevic, Dusan Askovic, Dan Burkart		KGP (maj.) (April 17)
Contact High	Michael Glawogger	Michael Ostrowski, Raimund Wallisch, Detlev Buck, Georg Friedrich	comedy	Lotus Film, Novotny & Novotny (maj.) (April 17)
Gibellina – Il Terremoto	Jörg Burger	–	documentary	Joerg Burger Filmproduktion (maj.) (April 17)
Sturmfrei	Hans Selikovsky	Wolfram Berger, Teresa Blaschke, Wolfgang Böck	comedy	Hans Selikovsky Film (April 24)
Feuerherz	Luigi Falorni	Letekidan Micael, Solomie Micael	drama, biography	Josef Aichholzer Filmproduktion (min.) (May 15)
Flieger über Amazonien	Herbert Brödl	–	documentary	Geyrhalter Film (June 5)
Coma	Ludwig Wüst		drama	Film Pla.net (June 26)
Plastic Planet (film)	Werner Boote	–	documentary	Neue Sentimental Film (min.) (September 18)
Der Weg nach Mekka – Die Reise des Muhammad Asad	Georg Misch	–	documentary	Mischief Films (September 18)
Rimini	Peter Jaitz	–	documentary	Filmakademie (September 25)
The White Ribbon (Das weisse Band)	Michael Haneke	Christian Friedel, Leonie Benesch, Ulrich Tukur	drama	Wega Film (min.) (September 25)
Gurbet in der Fremde	Kenan Kilic			Kilic Film (October 2)
Der Fall des Lemming	Nikolaus Leytner	Roland Düringer, Fritz Karl	crime, comedy	Allegro Film (October 2)
Tortuga – Die unglaubliche Reise der Meeresschildkröte	Nick Stringer	–	documentary	Allegro Film (min.) (October 2)
Desert Flower (Wüstenblume)	Sherry Hormann	Liya Kebede, Sally Hawkins	drama	Dor Film (min.) (October 9)
Little Alien	Nina Kusturica	–	documentary	Mobilefilm (October 9)
Eine von 8	Sabine Derflinger	–	documentary	gegenfilm (October 16)
The Angel Maker	Christine Hartmann	Luisa Katharina Davids, Jonas Laux	thriller	Mona (October 23)
Hogi's Family	Kurt Mündl		animation	Power of Earth Film (October 23)
Blutsfreundschaft	Peter Kern			Novotny & Novotny (November 5)
Josef Winkler − Der Kinoleinwandgeher	Michael Pfeifenberger, Josef Winkler			Focus Film (November 5)
La Pivellina	Tizza Covi, Rainer Frimmel			Vento Film (maj.) (November 13)
Die kleinen Bankräuber	Armands Zvirbulis			Mini Film (min.) (November 20)
Mount St. Elias	Gerald Salmina			Planet Watch (November 26)
Das Vaterspiel	Michael Glawogger		feature	Lotus Film (min.) (November 27)
So schaut's aus – G'schichten vom Willi Resetarits	Harald Friedl	Willi Resetarits	documentary, biography	Kurt Mayer Film (November 27)
Anna and the Prince	Julian Pölsler	Anna Maria Mühe, Tobias Moretti	biography	(December 30)
Lourdes	Jessica Hausner	Sylvie Testud, Léa Seydoux, Bruno Todeschini, Elina Löwensohn	feature	coop99 (maj.) (September 1)
