= List of Austrian film directors =

The list of Austrian film directors includes Austrian directors and directors born in Austria or Austria-Hungary who made at least one fictional or documentary film for cinema. Directors who were active in more than one era are listed only in that era, where they started their career as director.

== Silent film era (1906–1930) ==
=== Fictional films ===
- Artur Berger
- Eduard von Borsody
- Julius von Borsody
- Julius Brandt
- H. K. Breslauer
- Michael Curtiz
- Ludwig Czerny
- Géza von Cziffra
- Paul Czinner
- Alfred Deutsch-German
- Karl Ehmann
- Friedrich Fehér
- Jacob Fleck
- Luise Fleck
- Fritz Freisler
- Josef Hader
- Alfred Halm
- Emmerich Hanus
- Heinz Hanus
- Karl Hartl
- Franz Höbling
- Wilhelm Klitsch
- Eduard Köck
- Franz Köhler
- Anton Kolm
- Alexander Korda
- Fritz Kortner
- Otto Kreisler
- Robert Land
- Emil Leyde
- Hans Otto Löwenstein
- Ernst Marischka
- Hubert Marischka
- Joe May
- Wolfgang Neff
- Max Neufeld
- G. W. Pabst
- Arnold Pressburger
- Johann Schwarzer
- Paul L. Stein
- Wilhelm Thiele
- Gustav Ucicky
- Claudius Veltée
- Berthold Viertel

=== Traditional animation ===
- Peter Eng

=== Documentary films ===
- Joseph Delmont
- Richard Oswald

== Early sound film era (1929–1959) ==
=== Fictional films ===
- Otto Ambros
- Franz Antel
- Rudolf Bernauer
- Géza von Bolváry
- Siegfried Breuer
- Rudolf Carl
- E. W. Emo
- Walter Felsenstein
- Willi Forst
- Wolfgang Glück
- Leopold Hainisch
- Eduard Hoesch
- Ernst Hofbauer
- Paul Hörbiger
- Johann Alexander Hübler-Kahla
- Otto Kanturek
- Rudolph Katscher
- Georg C. Klaren
- Walter Kolm-Veltée
- Anton Kutter
- Reginald LeBorg
- Wolfgang Liebeneiner
- Paul Löwinger
- Franz Marischka
- Georg Marischka
- Rudolf Meinert
- Kurt Meisel
- Gerhard Menzel
- Ernst Neubach
- Otto Preminger
- Harald Reinl
- Georg Tressler
- Bernhard Wicki
- Herbert Wise

=== Documentary films ===
- Hans Hass

== 1960s to 1980s ==
=== Fictional films ===
- Ruth Beckermann
- Karin Brandauer
- John Cook
- Axel Corti
- Robert Dornhelm
- Valie Export
- Michael Glawogger
- Wolfgang Glück
- Franz Josef Gottlieb
- Andreas Gruber
- Peter Handke
- Michael Haneke
- Paul Harather
- Herbert Holba
- Gerald Kargl
- Peter Keglevic
- Peter Kern
- Leopold Lummerstorfer
- Paulus Manker
- Otto Mühl
- Rolf Olsen
- Peter Patzak
- Wolfram Paulus
- Stefan Ruzowitzky
- Ulrich Seidl
- Götz Spielmann

=== Avant-garde and experimental films ===
- Peter Kubelka
- Kurt Kren
- Otto Muehl
- Friederike Pezold
- Peter Weibel
- Rudolf Schwarzkogler

=== Documentary films ===
- Hubert Sauper

== After 1990 ==
=== Fictional films ===
- Barbara Albert
- Helmut Berger
- Klaus Maria Brandauer
- Sebastian Brauneis
- Robert Dornhelm
- Andrea Maria Dusl
- Michael Haneke
- Jessica Hausner
- Edgar Honetschläger
- Jörg Kalt
- Kevin Kopacka
- Nina Kusturica
- Ruth Mader
- Katharina Mückstein
- Florian Pochlatko
- Anja Salomonowitz
- Hubert Sauper
- Ulrich Seidl
- Harald Sicheritz
- Ludwig Wüst
- Daniel Shehata

=== Fictional and documentary films ===
- Rainer Frimmel
- Johannes Grenzfurthner
- Manu Luksch
- Anita Makris
- Erwin Wagenhofer

=== Experimental films ===
- Titus Leber
- Manu Luksch
- Bady Minck
- Virgil Widrich
