= Monika Willi =

Austrian film editor

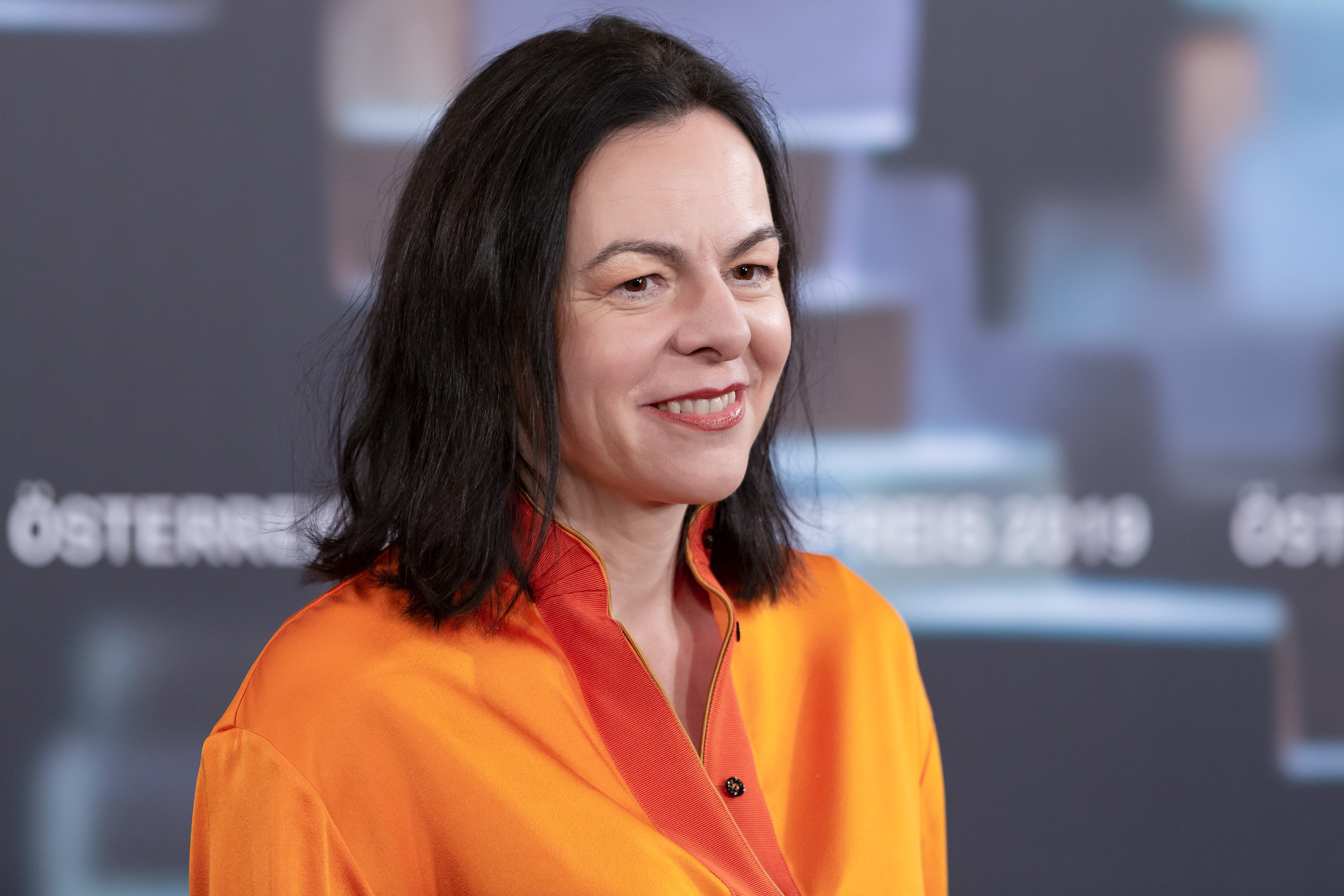
- Willi in 2019
- Born: 29 May 1968 (age 58); Innsbruck, Austria
- Other name: Mona Willi
- Occupation: Film editor

Monika Willi (German: [ˈmoːnika ˈvɪli]; born 29 May 1968), also known as Mona Willi, is an Austrian film editor. She is best known for her collaborations with filmmakers Michael Haneke, Michael Glawogger and Barbara Albert. In 2023, she was nominated for the Academy Award for Best Film Editing for her work on Todd Field's Tár.

== Early life ==
Monika Willi was born on 29 May 1968 in Innsbruck. She is the sister of Green Party politician Georg Willi, who has served as the mayor of Innsbruck since May 2018.

== Career ==
Willi posthumously realized and edited the material of Michael Glawogger, who died of malaria during the production of an untitled film project in Liberia in 2014. Under the title Untitled, it premiered in the Panorama section at the 67th Berlin International Film Festival in February 2017. Willi created the film using the footage from Glawogger's four and a half months of shooting through the Balkans, Italy and Africa. It also incorporates excerpts from Glawogger's diary. At the 2018 Austrian Film Awards, Untitled received four awards, including Best Documentary and Best Editing.

In 2017, she was inducted into the Academy of Motion Picture Arts and Sciences.

In 2019, for her work on Wolfgang Fischer's Styx, she was awarded an Austrian Film Award in the category Best Editing.

In January 2023, she was nominated for the Academy Award for Best Film Editing for her work on Todd Field's Tár. In his review of Tár, David Rooney of The Hollywood Reporter wrote, "Editor Monika Willi makes the expansive running time of more than two-and-a-half hours breathe, but also fly by with gripping tension".

== Filmography ==
=== Film ===
| Year | Title | Director | Notes |
|---|---|---|---|
| 1998 | Suzie Washington | Florian Flicker | |
| 1999 | Northern Skirts | Barbara Albert | |
| 2000 | Frankreich, wir kommen | Michael Glawogger | |
| 2000 | Hold-Up | Florian Flicker | |
| 2001 | The Piano Teacher | Michael Haneke | Edited with Nadine Muse |
| 2001 | Hainburg – Liebe und Widerstand | Wolfgang Murnberger | |
| 2002 | Richtung Zukunft durch die Nacht | Jörg Kalt | |
| 2002 | Kronen Zeitung – Tag für Tag ein Boulevardstück | Nathalie Borgers | |
| 2003 | Time of the Wolf | Michael Haneke | |
| 2003 | Böse Zellen | Barbara Albert | |
| 2004 | Ne fais pas ça! | Luc Bondy | |
| 2005 | Workingman's Death | Michael Glawogger | |
| 2007 | Funny Games | Michael Haneke | |
| 2009 | Contact High | Michael Glawogger | |
| 2009 | The White Ribbon | Michael Haneke | |
| 2011 | Whores' Glory | Michael Glawogger | |
| 2012 | Amour | Michael Haneke | |
| 2012 | The Dead and the Living | Barbara Albert | |
| 2014 | Last Summer | Leonardo Guerra Seràgnoli | |
| 2015 | Thank You for Bombing | Barbara Eder | |
| 2017 | Wild Mouse | Josef Hader | |
| 2017 | Untitled | Michael Glawogger and Monika Willi | Realized and edited after Glawogger's death |
| 2017 | Happy End | Michael Haneke | |
| 2018 | Styx | Wolfgang Fischer | |
| 2022 | Rimini | Ulrich Seidl | |
| 2022 | Tár | Todd Field | Nominated—Academy Award for Best Film Editing |
| 2022 | Sparta | Ulrich Seidl | |
| 2022 | Mein Vater, der Fürst | Lila Morgan and Lukas Sturm | |
| 2025 | Sons of the Neon Night | Juno Mak | |
| 2025 | The Carpenter's Son | Lotfy Nathan | |

=== Television ===
| Year | Title | Notes |
|---|---|---|
| 2022 | Funeral for a Dog | Miniseries; 8 episodes |

== Awards and nominations ==
| Award | Date of ceremony | Category | Film | Result | Ref. |
|---|---|---|---|---|---|
| Academy Awards | 12 March 2023 | Best Film Editing | Tár | Nominated | |
| Austrian Film Award | 27 January 2012 | Best Editing | Whores' Glory | Nominated | |
| Austrian Film Award | 23 January 2013 | Best Editing | Die Lebenden | Won | |
| Austrian Film Award | 1 February 2017 | Best Editing | Thank You for Bombing | Won | |
| Austrian Film Award | 31 January 2018 | Best Documentary | Untitled | Won | |
| Austrian Film Award | 31 January 2018 | Best Editing | Untitled | Won | |
| Austrian Film Award | 30 January 2019 | Best Editing | Styx | Won | |
| César Awards | 22 February 2013 | Best Editing | Amour | Nominated | |
| Chicago Film Critics Association Awards | 14 December 2022 | Best Editing | Tár | Nominated | |
| Critics' Choice Movie Awards | 15 January 2023 | Best Editing | Tár | Nominated | |
