= You Bet Your Life (disambiguation) =

You Bet Your Life is an American game show.

You Bet Your Life may also refer to:

- You Bet Your Life, a 1978 novel by Stuart M. Kaminsky
- "You Bet Your Life", a 1967 song by Bobby McDowell
- "You Can Bet Your Life", a 1956 song by Little Esther
- You Bet Your Life (2006 film), a 2006 Austrian film directed by Antonin Svoboda (director)
- You Bet Your Life (1992 TV series), remake of the game show
