= Abendland =

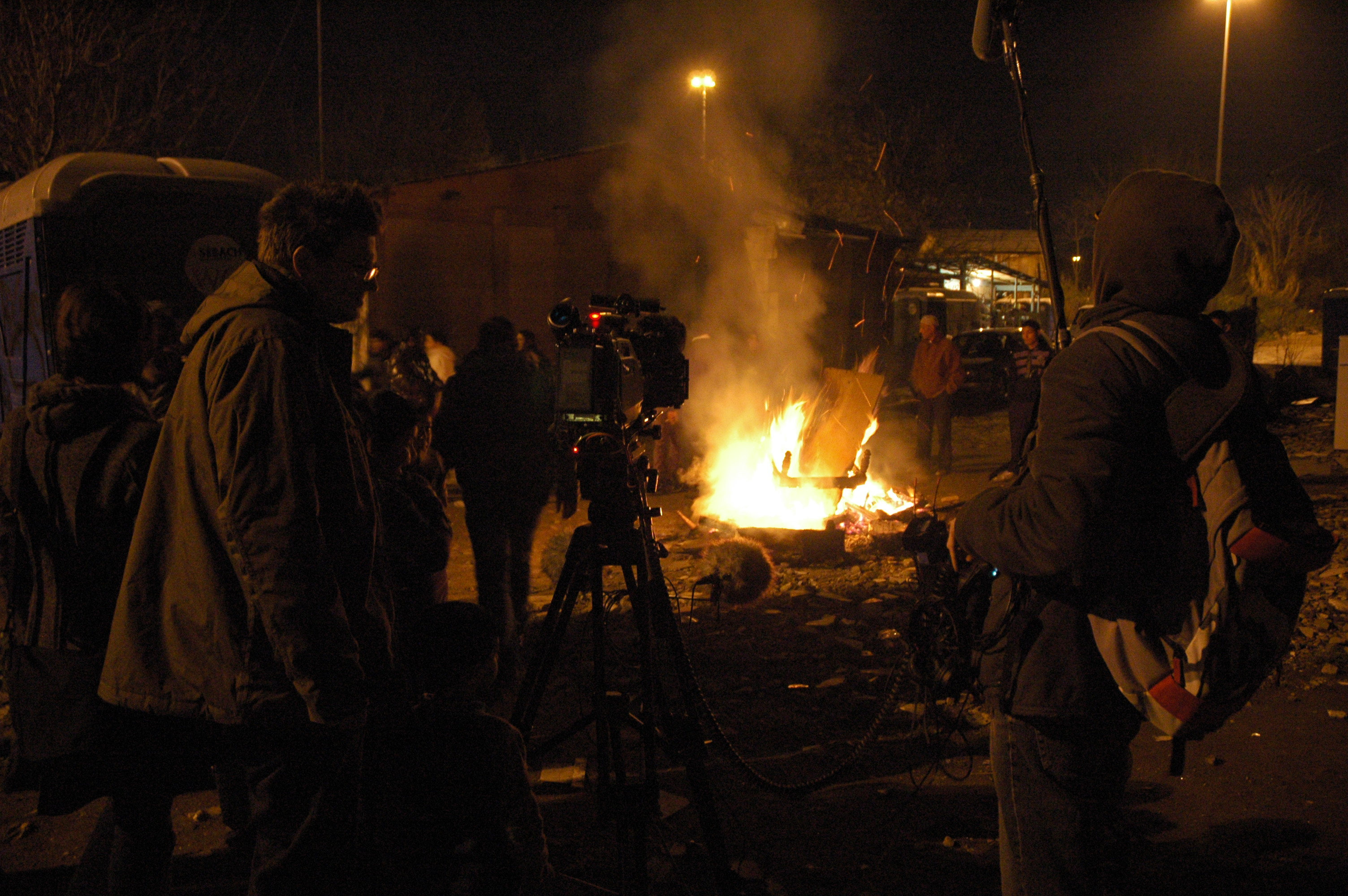
- Directed by: Nikolaus Geyrhalter
- Written by: Nikolaus Geyrhalter
- Produced by: Nikolaus Geyrhalter; Markus Glaser; Michael Kitzberger; Wolfgang Widerhofer
- Cinematography: Nikolaus Geyrhalter
- Edited by: Wolfgang Widerhofer
- Production company: Nikolaus Geyrhalter Filmproduktion
- Release date: March 22, 2011
- Running time: 90 minutes
- Country: Austria
- Language: Various

Abendland (Note: The German word Abendland means "land of evening (Abend)", i.e., where the sun sets, the West or Occident, by extension Christendom.) is a 2011 documentary film by Nikolaus Geyrhalter. The documentary, which has only scenes at night, explores European obsession with technology and security. It was released in Austria and Germany in 2011 and in the United States in 2012.

== Critical reception ==
Manohla Dargis of The New York Times called Abendland a "visually precise and politically amorphous" portrait of an imagined community: "The overall impression is a vision of Europe as a mosaic, as an artful amalgam of perfectly framed, seemingly disconnected moments during a long shared night, give or take a time zone change or two." Nick Pinkerton, reviewing for The Village Voice, describes the documentary, "The film's principal subjects are the eurozone's service and security industries, showing a continent busy saving its citizens from themselves." Pinkerton compared Abendland to the works of other Austrian directors Ulrich Seidl and Michael Glawogger in how they show "under-the-hood images of the global economy’s workings".
