= Moneyocracy =

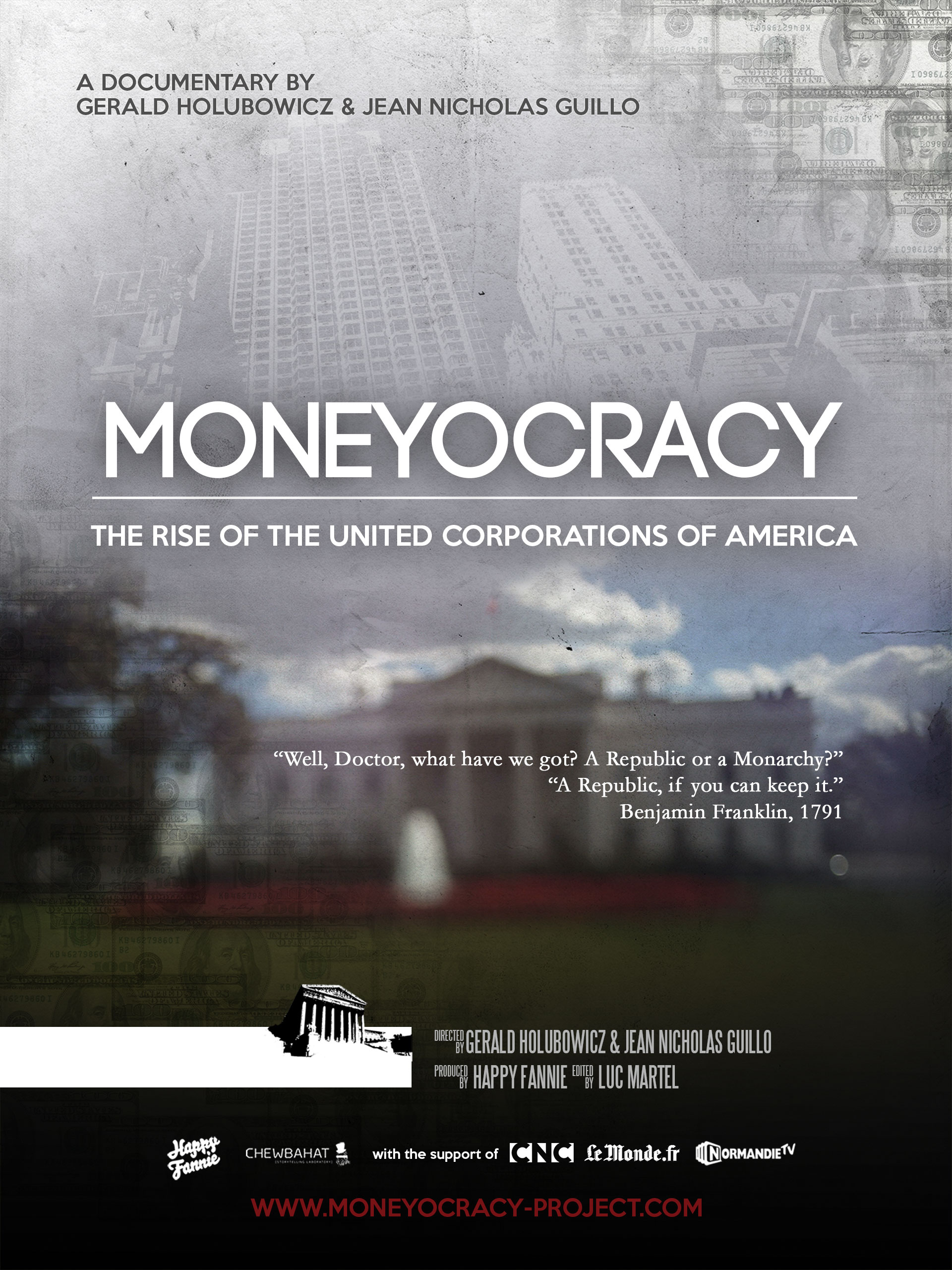
- Official release poster
- Directed by: Gerald Holubowicz & Jean Nicholas Guillo
- Produced by: Sandrine Girbal/Happy Fannie
- Narrated by: David Gassman
- Cinematography: Gerald Holubowicz; Jean Nicholas Guillo
- Edited by: Luc Martel
- Release date: 2012
- Running time: 92 minutes
- Country: France
- Language: English

Moneyocracy is a 2012 documentary film about Citizens United v. Federal Election Commission, 558 U.S. 310 (2010), which was a landmark United States Supreme Court case in which the Court held that the First Amendment prohibited the government from restricting independent political expenditures by corporations and unions. The film explores how the Citizens United v. Federal Election Commission decision has dramatically changed the U.S. Campaign Finance Laws and lead to the most expensive Elections in the United States. The film describes the systemic corruption of the United States democracy and the consequences of that systemic corruption on the U.S. democracy and the electorate.

== Synopsis ==
The 2012 Presidential election was the most costly ever in U.S. history. More than $6 billion have been spent by the Campaigns and independent groups to get their candidate elected.

In April 2011, Barack Obama launched his 2012 presidential campaign with these words: "We’re doing this now, because the politics we believe in does not start with expensive TV Ads or extravaganzas…"

With these words, the U.S. president directly referred to the Supreme Court's decision made on January 21, 2010, in the case Citizens United vs. Federal Election Commission. The U.S. Supreme Court decided that all restrictions placed on how much financial support private entities would be allowed to contribute to their preferred candidate's campaign (mainly via political advertisements), would violate the First Amendment and is therefore, unconstitutional.

This controversial Supreme Court decision built the framework of a new era in the privatization of the American electoral system. Thus far, Congress has failed to draft an amendment to address this decision, which will undoubtedly result in an increase of all corporate-derived lobbying and influence in American politics. Former Presidents Woodrow Wilson, Franklin D. Roosevelt and Dwight D. Eisenhower warned America against the influence of private and corporate interests over the democratic process. Today, the risks of passive corruption have never been greater in Washington and democracy feebly lingers in the shadow of Wall Street.

What are the legal and political implications of this decision? Is this the beginning of a new era when corporations will shape the political arena as their businesses? What are the consequences for Americans and the rest of the world? If the world's first democratic power falls into the hands of private interest groups, what will the implications be for China, Europe, South America or Africa ? In Ohio alone - one of the first political ad markets in the U.S. - the total amount of money spent by both sides (Republicans and Democrats) reached $30 million. A record since the beginning of TV advertising. These ads are mainly paid for by non-party groups independent from the candidates' campaigns. They are known as Super PACs, and 501c4s and their only purpose is to influence the electorate.

Super-PAC money spent on TV ads is called "Independent Expenditures". Since the 2006 mid-term elections, these have gone up by 338%. Given that only 0.26% of Americans donate to political campaigns, where does the money spent by the Super PACS to influence American voters come from ? 80% of the money received by these groups is provided by a tiny portion of the American people – 0.0000063% to be precise. Who are these 0.0000063% ?

== Interviews ==
Main characters appearing in the documentary and the interactive documentary:

- Trevor Potter, Campaign Finance Expert, Former Commissioner & Chairman of Federal Election Commission and Attorney
- Bob Biersack, Former FEC Data analyst and Senior Fellow at OpenSecrets
- Adam Skaggs, Senior Counsel at the Brennan Center for Justice
- Lawrence Lessig, co-founder of Creative Commons and law professor
- Walter Shapiro, Political Columnist, 9 Presidential campaign covered
- John Bonifaz, co-founder and executive director of Free Speech For People
- Paul Blumenthal, Reporter @HuffingtonPost covering campaign finance
- Adam Lioz, Lawyer and policy advocate for Demos.org
- Tom Sutton, Chair of Political Science at the Baldwin-Wallace University (OH)

== See also ==
- Citizens United v. Federal Election Commission
- Campaign finance in the United States
- Campaign finance
- Campaign finance reform in the United States
- DISCLOSE Act
- Political corruption
- Political finance
- Political action committee

== Related movies ==
- Inside Job
- Capitalism: A Love Story
- Debtocracy
- Generation Zero
- Let's Make Money
- Too Big to Fail
