= Whores' Glory =

2011 film by Michael Glawogger

Whores’ Glory
- DVD cover
- Directed by: Michael Glawogger
- Written by: Michael Glawogger
- Produced by: Erich Lackner, Tommy Pridnig, Peter Wirthensohn
- Cinematography: Wolfgang Thaler
- Edited by: Monika Willi
- Release date: 2011
- Running time: 119 minutes
- Countries: Austria, Germany
- Languages: Thai, Bengali, Spanish

Whores' Glory is a 2011 documentary by Michael Glawogger. It shows the life of prostitutes from Thailand, Bangladesh and Mexico.

== Synopsis ==
The film is divided into three locally defined episodes: Bangkok (Thailand), Faridpur (Bangladesh) and Reynosa (Mexico).

The first part deals with the everyday work of prostitutes in Bangkok, in a brothel called the Fish Tank. The prostitutes sit in a brightly lit glass room and are chosen by clients by the number used to identify them.

The second part is about a vast brothel called the City of Joy, in the town of Faridpur, Bangladesh. There, 600 to 800 women work in a confined space. In one scene, a madame buying a prostitute from another madame haggles over the price of the girl.

The third part takes place in the city of Reynosa, near the Texas border. There it is common, as in other Mexican cities, to designate the legal areas for prostitution as zonas de tolerancia (tolerance zones). The entrance to the Zona is secured with barriers and is constantly monitored by the police.

== Critical response ==
Critics and audiences responded more with respect for Glawogger's self-described "cinematic triptych on prostitution" than outright praise.

On RottenTomatoes.com, the film was given an 89% ranking by critics, with an average rating of 7.5/10. On Metacritic, the has film a weighted average score of 73 out of 100 based on reviews from 10 critics, indicating "generally favorable reviews".

Andrew O'Hehir, writing for Salon, applauded "the film's insistence that the women Glawogger meets ... remain defiantly individual, even in the face of a system of sexual and economic exploitation they cannot (or at least do not) resist." Similarly, Stephen Holden, of the New York Times, and Michael O'Sullivan, of the Washington Post, praised the film for the non-judgmental stance it takes towards the sex workers it encounters.

Finally, critics seemed to praise both the remarkable amount of access granted to Glawogger in shooting Whores' Glory and the hands-off approach he adopted. The film presents itself to its audience without the aid of narrations or commentary.

== Awards ==
- Venice Film Festival 2011: Orizzonti Special Jury Prize
- Österreichischer Filmpreis (Austrian Film Awards) 2012 for Best Documentary and Best Cinematography
