= Mademoiselle Paradis =

2017 Austrian-German drama film directed by Barbara Albert

- German: Licht
- Directed by: Barbara Albert
- Written by: Kathrin Resetarits; Barbara Albert
- Based on: Mesmerized (Am Anfang war die Nacht Musik) by Alissa Walser
- Produced by: Nikolaus Geyrhalter; Michael Kitzberger
- Starring: Maria-Victoria Dragus; Devid Striesow; Susanne Wuest
- Cinematography: Christine A. Maier
- Edited by: Niki Mossböck
- Music by: Lorenz Dangel
- Production companies: Nikolaus Geyrhalter Filmproduktion; LOOKSfilm
- Distributed by: Farbfilm-Verleih; Arte
- Release date: 8 September 2017 (TIFF)
- Running time: 97 minutes
- Countries: Austria; Germany

Mademoiselle Paradis (German: Licht) is an Austrian-German biographical drama film, directed by Barbara Albert and released in 2017. An adaptation of Alissa Walser's historical novel Mesmerized (Am Anfang war die Nacht Musik), the film stars Maria-Victoria Dragus as Maria Theresia von Paradis, the blind Austrian musician and composer who was subjected to attempts by physician Franz Mesmer (Devid Striesow) to restore her sight but which had the perverse side effect of diminishing her musical talent.

The cast also includes Lukas Miko and Katja Kolm as Paradis's parents and Susanne Wuest as Jungfer Ossine, as well as Maresi Riegner, Johanna Orsini-Rosenberg, Stefanie Reinsperger, Christoph Luser, Theresa Martini, Vivienne Causemann, Katharina Farnleitner, Julia Pointner, Tommy Baudis, Hermann Scheidleder, Margarete Tiesel, Lukas Watzl and Birgit Linauer in supporting roles.

The film premiered in the Platform Prize program at the 2017 Toronto International Film Festival.

== Critical response ==
Allan Hunter of Screen Daily wrote that "Across all of its elements, Mademoiselle Paradis illustrates a rich selection of themes from the class divide of the period to the treatment of the afflicted and the plight of Maria as a young woman given no say in her own future."

For Variety, Guy Lodge wrote that "a rueful streak of feminist satire thus emerges in Mademoiselle Paradis, as it becomes clear the young woman’s wellbeing is but a secondary concern in what finally amounts to masculine scientific pissing contest: If an improvement in her condition means a validation of Mesmer’s controversial methods, frankly, other doctors would rather see her blind. As deftly played by Striesow, Mesmer remains an ambiguous figure to the last: Kindly but evidently ego-driven, he seems motivated in equal measure by her growing progress and his growing celebrity."

Boyd van Hoeij of The Hollywood Reporter wrote that Dragus's performance held the film together, but stated that "in [Kathrin] Resetarits’ screenplay, there is no attempt to directly connect the changes Resi undergoes to an overall story arc, with the film never developing a strong narrative throughline on which to hang all of its secondary ideas about gender, disabilities, class, science, music and mores. So the overall impact is finally quite diffuse, with various interesting ideas developed in a scattershot manner over the course of several not necessarily connected scenes."

== Awards ==
Award	Year	Category	Recipient	Result	Ref.
Austrian Film Awards	2018	Best Film	Michael Kitzberger, Wolfgang Widerhofer, Nikolaus Geyrhalter, Markus Glaser, Barbara Albert	Nominated	
Austrian Film Awards	2018	Best Director	Barbara Albert	Nominated	
Austrian Film Awards	2018	Best Actor	Devid Striesow	Nominated	
Austrian Film Awards	2018	Best Actress	Maria-Victoria Dragus	Nominated	
Austrian Film Awards	2018	Best Supporting Actress	Katja Kolm	Nominated	
Austrian Film Awards	2018	Best Supporting Actress	Maresi Riegner	Won	
Austrian Film Awards	2018	Best Screenplay	Kathrin Resetarits	Nominated	
Austrian Film Awards	2018	Best Cinematography	Christine A. Maier	Won	
Austrian Film Awards	2018	Best Costume Design	Veronika Albert	Won	
Austrian Film Awards	2018	Best Makeup	Helene Lang	Won	
Austrian Film Awards	2018	Best Score	Lorenz Dangel	Nominated	
Austrian Film Awards	2018	Best Editing	Niki Mossböck	Nominated	
Austrian Film Awards	2018	Best Sound Editing	Christian Conrad, Alexander Koller, Dietmar Zuson	Nominated	
Austrian Film Awards	2018	Best Production Design	Katharina Wöppermann	Won	
