= Struggle (2003 film) =

2003 film

- Directed by: Ruth Mader
- Written by: Barbara Albert; Martin Leidenfrost; Ruth Mader
- Produced by: Alexander Dumreicher-Ivanceanu; Gabriele Kranzelbinder; Ruth Mader
- Starring: Aleksandra Justa
- Cinematography: Bernhard Keller
- Edited by: Niki Mossböck
- Release date: 13 June 2003
- Running time: 74 minutes
- Country: Austria
- Language: German

Struggle is a 2003 Austrian drama film directed by Ruth Mader. It was screened in the Un Certain Regard section at the 2003 Cannes Film Festival.

== Cast ==
- Aleksandra Justa - Ewa
- Gottfried Breitfuss - Harold (as Gottfried Breitfuß)
- Margit Wrobel - Doctor
- Martin Brambach - Martin
- Rainer Egger
