= Maria-Victoria Dragus =

German-Romanian actress

Maria Drăguș
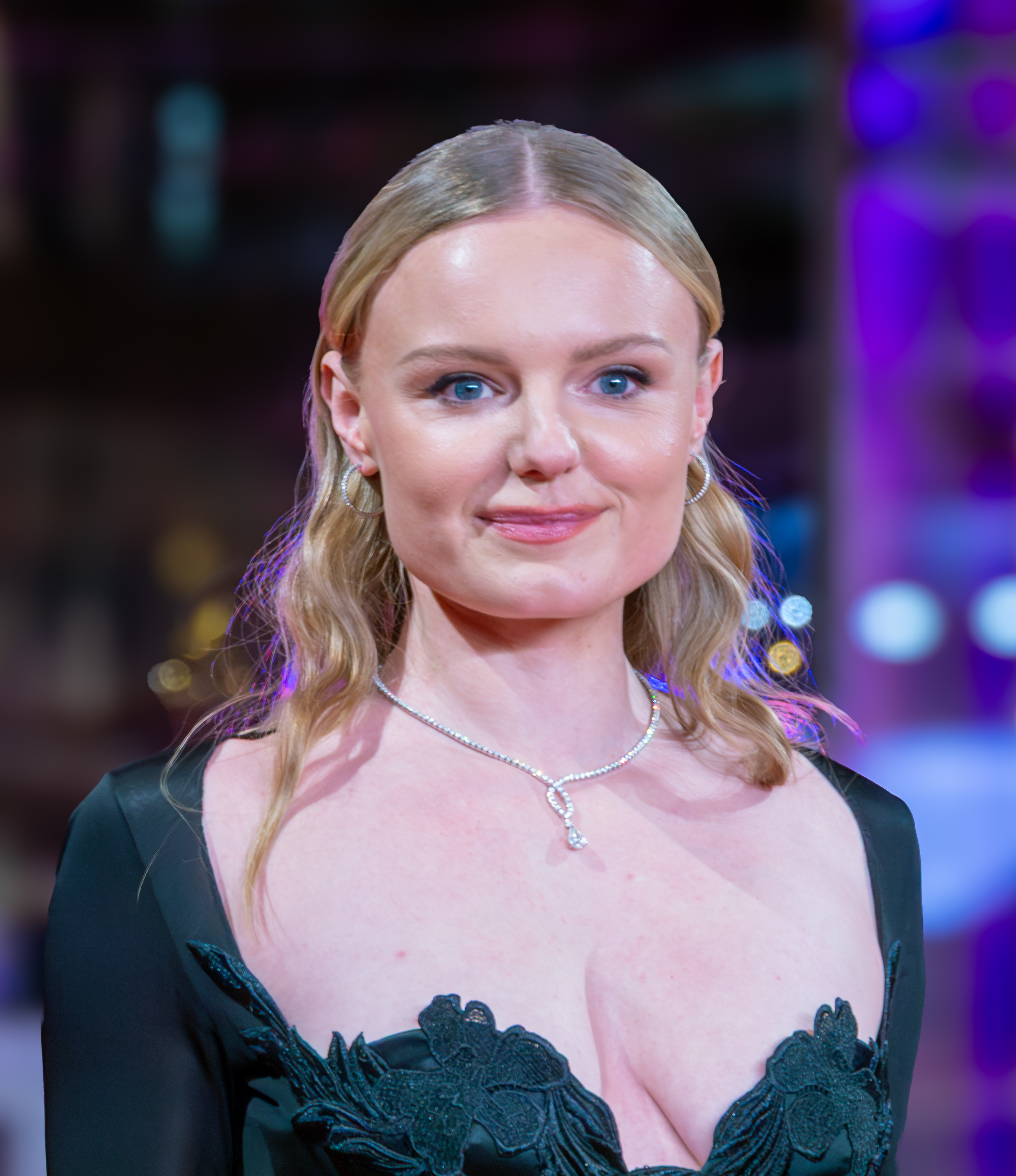
- Dragus at the 2026 Berlin Film Festival.
- Born: 1994 (age 31–32); Dresden, Germany
- Occupation: Actress
- Years active: 2007–present
- Website: www.mariadragus.com

Maria-Victoria Drăguș (born 1994) is a Romanian-German actress. Her film credits include If Not Us, Who?, Summer Outside and Kill Me. One notable role was in Palme d'Or-winning 2009 film The White Ribbon. She has had reoccurring roles in the television programs Dance Academy and Leipzig Homicide. She has a younger sister Paraschiva, and is the niece of the French writer Viorel Dragus.

== Selected filmography ==
- The White Ribbon (2009)
- If Not Us, Who? (2011)
- Kill Me (2012)
- Summer Outside (2012)
- 24 Weeks (2016)
- Graduation (2016)
- Tiger Girl (2017)
- Mademoiselle Paradis (2017)
- Mary Queen of Scots (2018)
- Brecht (2019)
- Rose (2026)

== Awards ==
- 2014 Shooting Stars Award at the Berlin International Film Festival
