= Space Hop =

Educational board game

Box lid art, 1973

Space Hop is an educational board game about astronomy published by Teaching Concepts in 1973.

== Description ==
Space Hop is a board game for 2–4 players that is designed to teach the players about the Solar System.

=== Components ===
The game has the following components:

- board (map of the Solar System)
- three decks of cards: mission, hop and SNC
- clue decoder wheel
- two six-sided dice

=== Set-up ===
Each player rolls the dice and starts their token on the space port corresponding to their roll. Each player draws a mission card which gives a clue as to the player's destination.

=== Gameplay ===
The active player draws a hop card. If the active player is sure about their destination, they can spend their turn moving towards it. If the player is not sure, they can use the decoder wheel to decode the name of their destination, but doing so will use up their entire turn.

=== Movement ===
The player can choose to navigate towards their destination by using their accumulated hop cards to hop from portal to portal. Or they can roll the dice and move the indicated number of spaces, avoiding asteroids, comets, and other space ships. Once close to their destination, the player must roll the exact number needed in order to land.

=== Getting credit ===
Once at the destination, the player draws an SNC card (or two cards if their mission card had a star). These cards award the player with credits. The player then draws a new mission card, and play continues.

=== Victory conditions ===
The first player to amass 25 credits wins the game.

== Publication history ==
Space Hop was designed by Helmut Wimmer, a resident artist at New York's Hayden Planetarium at the time of the game's publication. It was published by Teaching Concepts in 1973.

== Reception ==
In December 1973, Ellen Stock of New York Magazine recommended Space Hop and the other four games produced by Teaching Concepts as good educational Christmas gifts.

In 1977, Pamela Riley and Patricia Powers named Space Hop as a potentially positive influence on non-sex-biased career options for 4th grade students.

In the same year, Paul Hounshell and Ira Trollinger called Space Hop "An interesting and well-designed game for junior and senior high school students. It is fun for students to play and, in the process, they will learn many facts about the nature of the universe and space travel." They concluded "One class period is required to play the game but there should be time allotted to discuss various aspects of the universe and travel within it."

In 1987, Ellen Lederman chose Space Hop for inclusion in her book Educational Toys and Games: A Practical Guide to Selection and Utilization, noting that the game "Increases knowledge about the planets."

In a retrospective review almost 50 years after the game's publication, Scott Brady did think the game might have some educational merit but questioned its game value. He noted that the game was designed by a specialist in the field, not a game designer, saying "As with most other educational games, there is no revolutionary game play to be found." Brady thought the real value in buying a used copy would be to frame the attractive game board.
