= Homo Sapiens (film) =

2016 documentary film

- Directed by: Nikolaus Geyrhalter
- Cinematography: Nikolaus Geyrhalter
- Edited by: Michael Palm
- Release date: 12 February 2016 (Berlin)
- Running time: 94 minutes
- Language: None

Homo Sapiens is a 2016 documentary film directed by Nikolaus Geyrhalter.

== Description ==
Homo Sapiens consists of static shots showing derelict spaces. No people are seen or heard in the film. Brief intervals of blackness divide the footage into chapters.

The film opens with a scene showing the Buzludzha monument. Earlier scenes show building interiors, such as offices, churches, hospitals, and cinemas. As the film progresses, more outdoor scenes appear and signs of human presence become less conspicuous. It closes with the Buzludzha monument again, seen from outside as it is engulfed by white fog.

== Production ==
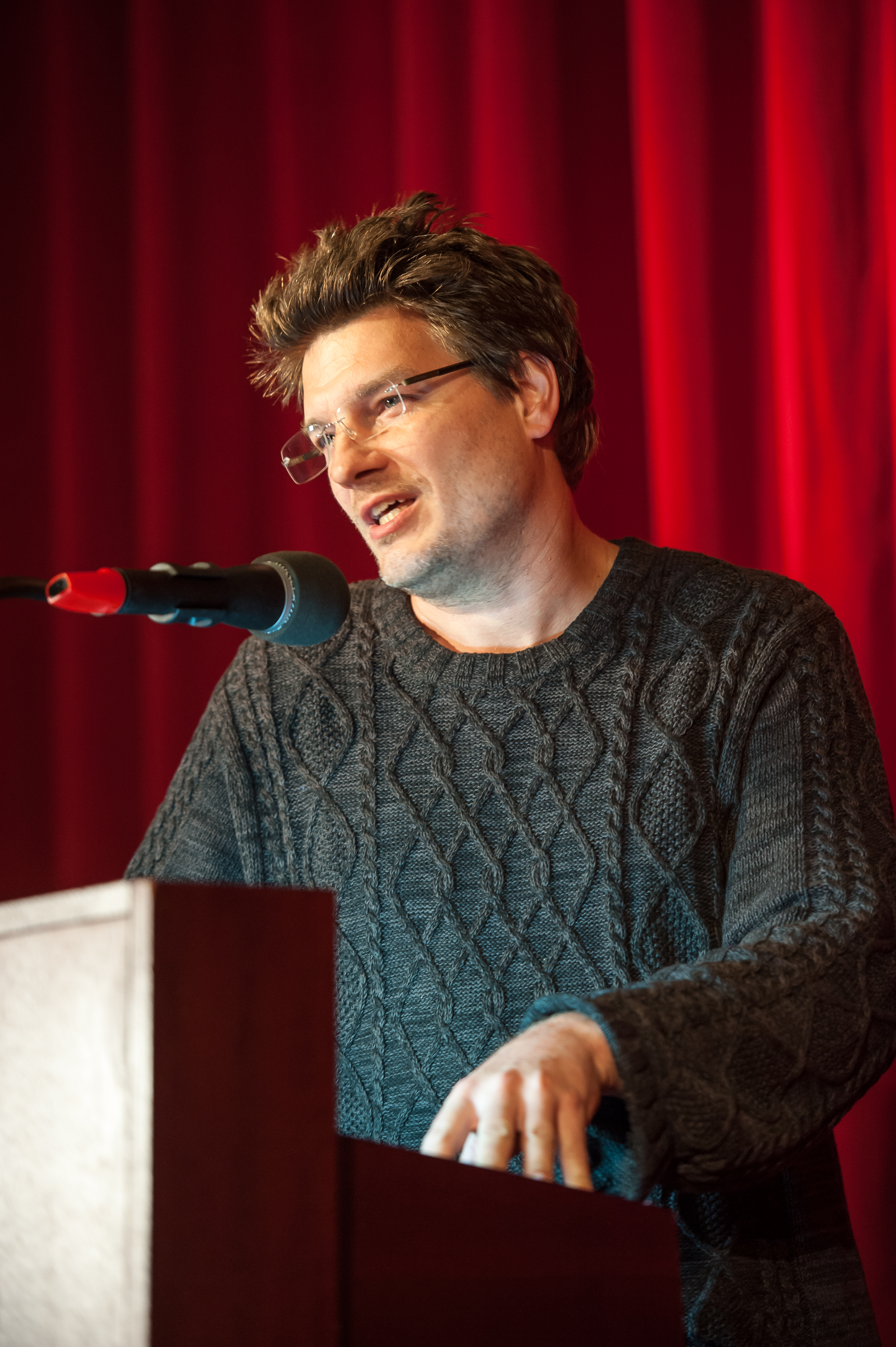
Director Nikolaus Geyrhalter in 2015

Filming took place over the course of four years, at over 100 sites. During pre-production research for the film, the crew found locations through urban exploration photography online. They used funding for the research to start visiting sites and immediately begin shooting scenes there. As this progressed, Geyrhalter identified topics that he wanted to cover and focused on looking for specific locations that could illustrate them. Locations included Europe, the United States, Argentina, Namibia, and Japan. Wide-angle lenses were used to produce exaggerated perspectives.

Geyrhalter assembled a rough edit of the film using half-minute durations for each shot and placeholder audio. Because he wanted to eliminate human noises from the film, very little sync sound was used. Audio was recorded separately before being edited to match the image track. Once that process was complete, the film was rearranged and shot lengths were adjusted based on the story arc and the impact of the audio track.

== Release ==
Homo Sapiens premiered on 12 February 2016 at the Berlin International Film Festival.

== Critical reception ==
On the review aggregator website Rotten Tomatoes, 100% of 8 critics' reviews are positive, with an average rating of 8.7/10. Peter Bradshaw called it "the most extraordinary documentary I have seen in years", describing its images as "as gripping as any of the sci-fi thrillers or post-apocalyptic dramas that would normally use scenes like these as establishing shots." In his review for The Village Voice, Michael Sicinski likened the film's compositions to the work of Anselm Kiefer, Andreas Gursky, and Christian Boltanski. He continued that "Instead of uncovering artifacts from long ago, Homo Sapiens shows us our own relics in the making." Glenn Kenny of The New York Times wrote that "Each individual shot creates a frisson of desolation that resonates far beyond the facile irony suggested by the movie’s title."

Slant Magazine ranked the film 20th on its Best Films of 2016 list.
