= Barbara Gräftner =

Austrian director

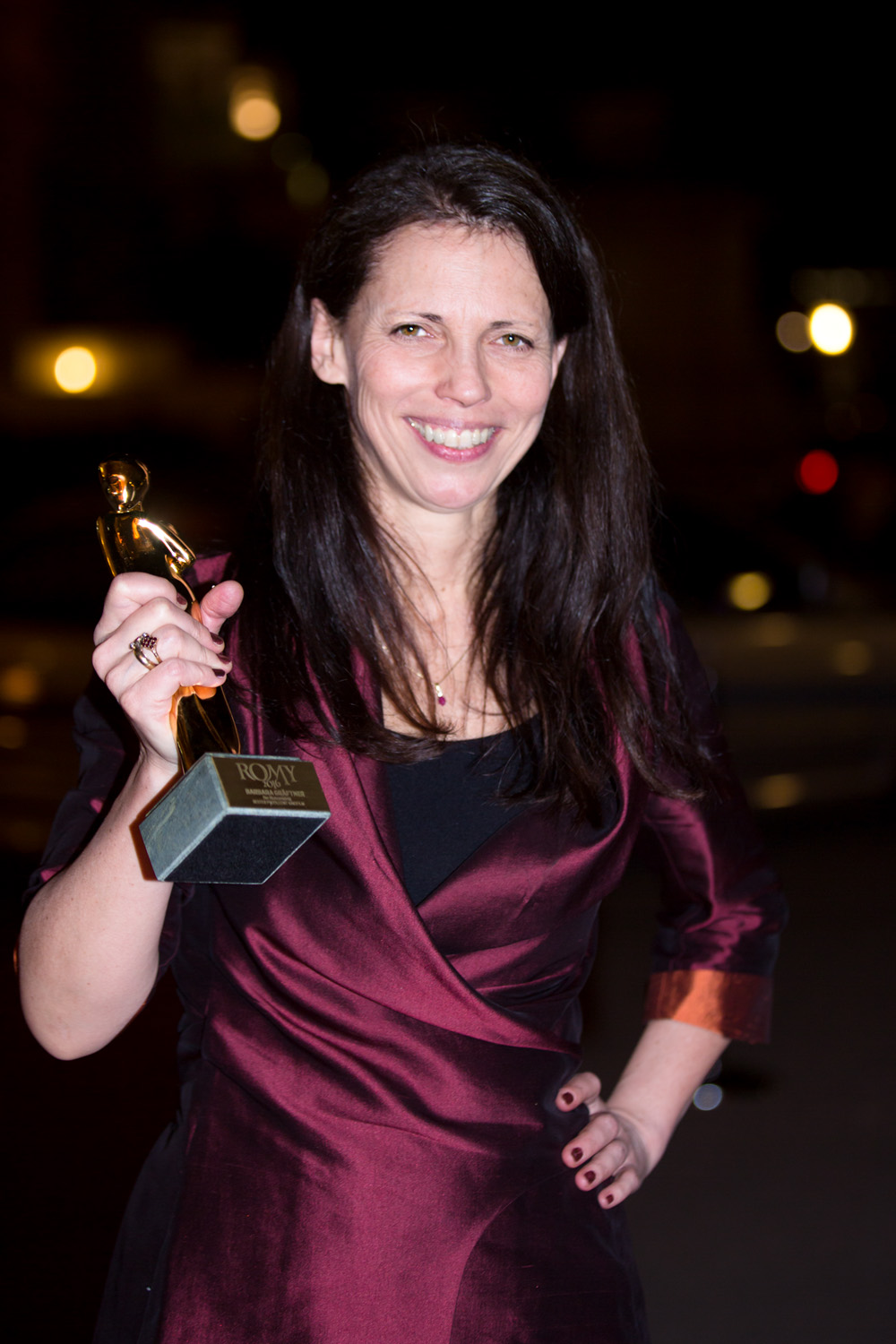
- Gräftner at the 2016 ROMY awards
- Born: Vienna, Austria
- Occupation: film director

Barbara Gräftner (born 1964 in Vienna) is an Austrian film director.

== Life ==
After completing her Matura at the Albertgasse grammar school in Vienna in 1983, Barbara Gräftner studied medicine and architecture at the University of Vienna from 1984 to 1995 and undertook in-depth training in medical psychology with a focus on psychooncology. From then on, she worked as a research assistant in the Internal Medicine Department of Oncology at the Rudolfstiftung. She was registered on the Austrian Medical Association's Turnusärzteliste.

In 1996 she passed the entrance examination to the Academy of Performing Arts Vienna and studied in the Film Academy Vienna's Film and Television department in the Screenwriting and Dramaturgy class with Walter Wippersberg. The following year she was accepted into Peter Patzak's directing class. In 2001, she co-founded Bonus Film.

In 2009, Barbara Gräftner founded the Austrian Film Academy together with other Austrian filmmakers.

From 2018 to 2019, she spent a year in Kenya for the multi-part film project "The Secret of the Kenyan Runners".

In 2021, her first play "Gott in Not" premiered in Neustrelitz.

== Filmography ==
- 1998: Gugging, 30 min., 16 mm, color 1997
- 1998: P.S. Matouschek, 12 min., 16 mm, B&W
- 1998: Schwul sein im Ländle, 20 min., Beta SP
- 1998: Winnetou, 15 min, 16 mm, black and white
- 1999: Froschkönig, 15 min., feature film, 16 mm
- 1999: Sell Ya, 40 min., documentary, Beta SP
- 2000: E-Risk, 20 min., industrial film Digi Beta
- 2002: Mein Russland, 92 min., 35 mm
- 2002: Unterwegs nach ... Heimat, 135 min.
- 2004: Der Traum vom Schweben, 90 min. documentary about male synchronized swimmers
- 2005: Die Testamentmaschine, 45/80 min. TV/cinema
- 2010: Echte Wiener 2 - Die Deppat'n und die Gspritzt'n, 100 min.
- 2014: Rise Up! And Dance, 100 min.
- 2019: The Secret of the Kenyan Runners, 4x90 min documentary series about the Kenyan long-distance runners

== Theater ==
- 2021: Gott in Not, world premiere on 31 July 2021, Theater und Orchester GmbH Neubrandenburg/Neustrelitz

== Awards ==
- 2002: Max-Ophüls-Preis for the feature film "Mein Russland"
- 2005: Goldene Romy for the best documentary (Der Weg nach ... Heimat)
- 2016: Romy in the category Best Producer Feature Film for Der Blunzenkönig
- 2017: 1st prize for "Blue" (TV series concept) at the TV Series Festival Berlin
