= Daniel Shehata =

Austrian film director

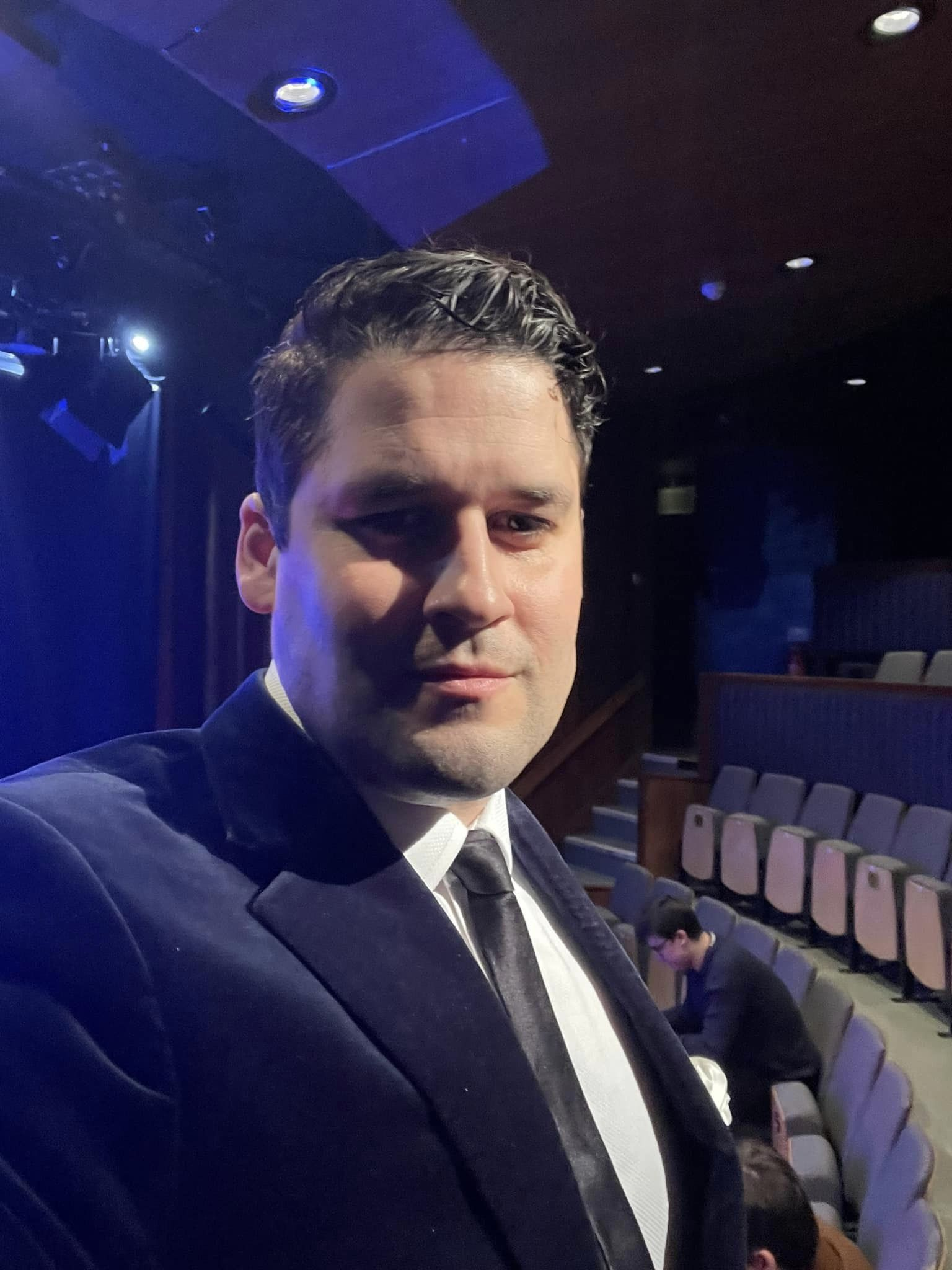
- Shehata in January 2023
- Born: 21 March 1985 (age 41); Vienna, Austria
- Education: De Montfort University
- Occupations: Film director; producer; screenwriter; businessman; engineer
- Years active: 2009–present
- Children: 1

Daniel Shehata is an Austrian film director and screenwriter. His debut film is a British neo-noir crime drama titled The Nautilus Mutiny, which won several critical awards.

Shehata holds an MA degree in filmmaking from the De Montfort University in Leicester, UK where he has been awarded the Best Postgraduate Student Prize in 2022.

Together with Bobby D'Buze, Shehata is currently directing Modern Audience - a feature length dramedy that deals with the life of protagonist Billy Baum, a screenwriter of past glory who is overwhelmed by a major studio's demand for a screenplay that would appeal to their modern audience.
