= Alexander Binder =

Austrian film director

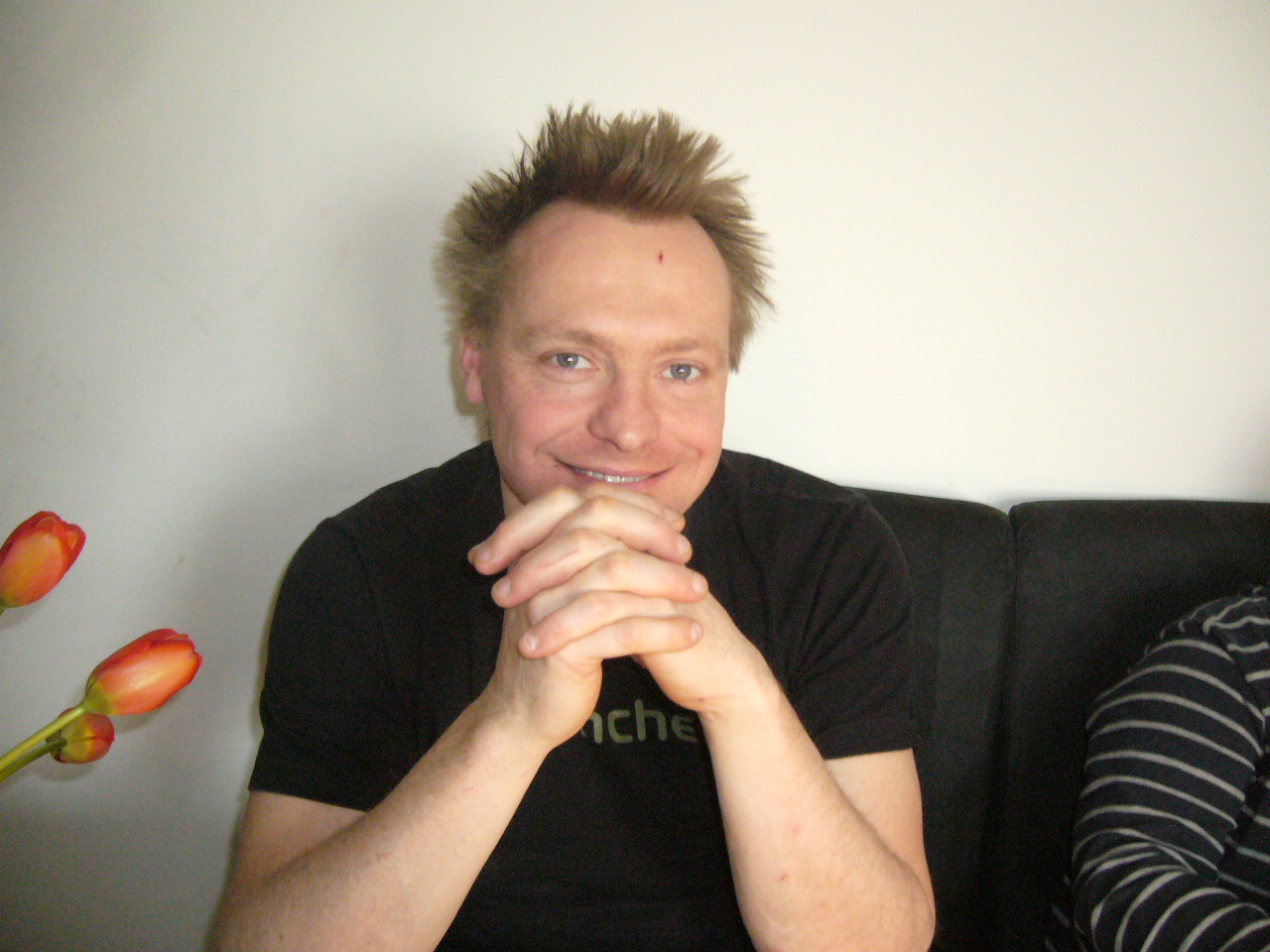
Alex Binder at a film festival 2008 in Leipzig

Alexander Binder is an Austrian film director, cameraman and film producer. His 2007 film "No Island: The Palmers Kidnapping of 1977" (German: "Keine Insel - Die Palmers Entführung 1977") has been noted in the New York Times.

== Life ==
Alexander Binder grew up in Hallstatt and Rosenheim. From 1991 to 1995, he studied at the Architecture at the Vienna University of Technology and Philosophy at the University of Vienna. From 1995 to 2003, he studied Film at the University of Music and Performing Arts.

== Films (excerpt) ==
Films of Alexander Binder as a director:

Documentaries:

- 2013: "Raison dÉtat - The Principle of Lie"
- 2010: "Zlin - The lived Utopia"
- 2007: "No Island - The Palmers Kidnapping of 1977"
- 2006: "Nothing is more exciting than reality"
- 2005: "Frequently Asked Questions"
- 2003: "Stossek 68 – 86"

Short Films:

- 1999: '"WOLKENBÜGEL"
- 1996: "ÖSTERREICH IM HERBST 95"
- 1996: Le Camelier
- 1996: Dürre Dirne
- 1995: Snakkerdu Densk in Allentsteig
- 1991: SNAKE

Works of Alexander Binder as cameraman:

- 2015: "Oppenheim"
- 2014: "Hydra Alpe Adria"
- 2013: "Raison dÉtat - The Principle of Lie"
- 2010: "Wildbach Toni-Kritik der reinen Vernunft"
- 2006: Jeder siebte Mensch - "Every seventh person"
- 2006: "Nothing is more exciting than reality"
- 2005: Import Export Das Tier neben uns
- 2003: Tosca (Band) – Wonderful
- 2001: Für einen Moment - "For a moment"
- 2001: Eine Hälfte der Nacht - "A half of the night"
- 1997: Tangram
- 1997: Die Bäder von Lucca - "The baths of Lucca"

== Festivals and Prizes ==
- Viennale, Festival der Nationen, Paris, Teheran, Triest, Winterthur, Leipzig
- Austin, Madrid Semana de Cine Experimental, Mar del Plata, Regensburg, Hamburg, Movcities Vienna
- Kapfenberg, Hannover, Rotterdam, Amsterdam, Montecatini Therme, Mexico
- München Dokumentarfilmfest, Duisburger Filmwoche, Seine St. Denis
- Montpellier, London international Documentary Festival,
- Winner Los Angeles Filmfestival
- Winner Golden Rhyon Sofia
- Honorable mention in Diagonale 2005 (Lobende Erwähnung Diagonale 2005)
- National Cultural Award for Talent in Upper Austria for experimental film
- "European Media Award" Golden Medal
