= Our Daily Bread (2005 film) =

- Directed by: Nikolaus Geyrhalter
- Written by: Wolfgang Widerhofer; Nikolaus Geyrhalter
- Produced by: Nikolaus Geyrhalter; Markus Glaser; Michael Kitzberger; Wolfgang Widerhofer
- Cinematography: Nikolaus Geyrhalter
- Edited by: Wolfgang Widerhofer
- Distributed by: Icarus Films (USA)
- Release dates: 28 November 2005 (Amsterdam International Documentary Film Festival); 21 April 2006 (Austria); 18 January 2007 (Germany)
- Running time: 92 minutes
- Countries: Austria; Germany
- Languages: Polish; German

Our Daily Bread (German: Unser täglich Brot) is a 2005 documentary film directed, co-produced, and with cinematography by Nikolaus Geyrhalter. The script was co-written by Wolfgang Widerhofer and Nikolaus Geyrhalter.

The film depicts how modern food production companies employ technology to produce food on large scales. It consists mainly of actual working situations without voice-over narration or interviews as the director tries to let viewers form their own opinion on the subject. The names of the companies where the footage was filmed are purposely not shown. The director's goal is to provide a realistic view on the internal workings of multiple food production companies in our modern society.

== Foods transformations ==
Different processes in agriculture and food processing plants are shown in the film. Since scenes are mixed, food transformations are listed below with no particular order.

- Semen to pigs
- Pigs to meat
- Semen to cows
- Cows to meat
- Cows to milk
- Eggs to chickens
- Chickens to eggs
- Chickens to meat
- Fish
- Crops and field harvests (misc)
- Tomatoes in rock wool
- Salads night harvest
- Peppers
- Cucumbers
- Apples
- Olives harvest
- Salt from mines

== Places and companies ==
The names of the companies where the footage was filmed are provided on the official site in the booklet pdf. They are listed below for convenience and to help further investigation:

- Danish Crown (pork, beef) company site Europe
- Tasty Tom (tomatoes) company site places Netherlands (sample Sat view)
- Geflügelhof Latschenberger GmbH (eggs) Biberbach, Austria
- Pro Ovo (eggs) company site Biberbach, Austria
- Radatz Fleischwaren (pork) company site Vienna, Austria
- Marché Couvert de Ciney (beef), Ciney, Belgium
- Abattoir et Marché de Bastogne (meat), company siteBastogne, Belgium
- Belgian Blue Group s.c.r.l (bulls) company site, Belgium
- Zaklady Drobiarskie ‘Kozieglowy’ Sp.zo.o (chickens), company site Kozieglowy, Poland
- Nutreco, Skretting, Marine Harvest, Norway, Marine Harvest processing plant Ryfisk at Hjelmeland (fish) company site Hjelmeland, Norway
- Vitana (pre-cooked foods), company site, Czech Republic
- Solofino (sprinkles) company site, Austria
- esco European salt company GmbH & Co. KG (rock salt) company site, Germany
- Agrargenossenschaft Cobbelsdorf eG (cereals), Cobbelsdorf Germany
- Kalbescher Werder Agrar GmbH (milk), Brunau Germany
- Quality Sprout Kerkdriel (sprouts), Kerkdriel Netherlands
- Löhle Thomas Obstbau (fruits), Uhldingen-Mühlhofen, Germany
- Salemfrucht GmbH (apples), Germany
- Árpád - Agrár Rt. (misc) company site Hungary
- Chiquita Deutschland (bananas) company site, Germany
- Sucatrans BVBA (transport of art), Belgium
- The Greenery (vegetables/fruits), company site, Netherlands
- Jamnica d.d., (mineral water) company site, Sveta Jana (???), Croatia
- Ferme la Béole (farm hostel) Belgium
- SAD s.r.o. (equipment?) Brezno, Slovakia

== Reception ==
Our Daily Bread has a 94% approval rating on Rotten Tomatoes, with the critical consensus stated as, "A matter-of-fact, nearly wordless documentary, Our Daily Bread's spare presentation of slaughterhouses and human consumption serves up food for thought." It also has an 86/100 on Metacritic, and received two votes in the 2012 Sight & Sound polls of the world's greatest films.

== Awards ==
Award wins:

- Grand Prix, Festival International du Film d'Environnement, Paris, 2006
- EcoCamera Award, Rencontres internationales du documentaire de Montréal, 2006
- Best Film, Ecocinema International Film Festival Athens 2006
- Honourable Mention, Special Jury Prize - International Feature - Hot Docs Canadian International Documentary Festival Toronto 2006
- Special John Templeton Prize - Visions du Réel documentary film festival, Nyon, Switzerland 2006:
- Special Jury Award - International Documentary Festival Amsterdam 2005

Nominations:

- Nomination, European Film Award, Prix Arte, 2006
