= Workingman's Death =

2005 documentary by Michael Glawogger

- DVD cover
- Directed by: Michael Glawogger
- Written by: Michael Glawogger
- Produced by: Pepe Danquart; Erich Lackner; Mirjam Quinte
- Cinematography: Wolfgang Thaler
- Edited by: Ilse Buchelt; Monika Willi
- Music by: John Zorn
- Distributed by: Paul Thiltges Distributions
- Release dates: September 2005 (Venice Film Festival); 25 November 2005 (Austria)
- Running time: 122 minutes
- Countries: Austria, Germany, Indonesia, France
- Languages: Pashto, Yoruba, German, English, Igbo, Indonesian, Mandarin, Russian

Workingman's Death is a 2005 Austrian-German documentary film written and directed by Michael Glawogger. It premiered at the 2005 Venice Film Festival. The film deals with the extremes to which workers go to earn a living in several countries around the world.

The film is composed of six chapters. The first five depict hazardous conditions of hard laborers around the world and the sixth shows contrasting scenes of youths in a former German industrial complex which had been converted into a leisure park:

1. "Heroes" – Miners of Donets Basin, Ukraine
2. "Ghosts" – Sulfur carriers in Ijen, Indonesia
3. "Lions" – Butchers in an open-air market in Port Harcourt, Nigeria
4. "Brothers" – Welders in the Gadani ship-breaking yard in Pakistan
5. "The Future" – Steel workers in Liaoning, China
6. "Epilogue" – Youths in Landschaftspark Duisburg-Nord in Germany

== Reception ==
The film was met with a largely positive critical reception with a 73% approval rating reported by Rotten Tomatoes as of March 2011, with several critics praising its visual feel. Walter Addiego of the San Francisco Chronicle' wrote that "Despite the hardships depicted, many sequences have a dreamlike beauty. In addition, the director has a bone-dry sense of irony; during the Ukraine scenes, he frequently cuts away to a statue of Stakhanov, the 'hero' lauded by the Soviets for his superhuman work habits".

Film critic Nathan Rabin, writing for The A.V. Club, said that "Glawogger is an extraordinarily elegant filmmaker with a photographer's eye for striking compositions. He seems to have selected the jobs documented here as much for their telegenic qualities as their all-around awfulness, and he excels at divining moments of pure cinema and haunting beauty out of the most perilous places and professions on Earth".

The Village Voice's Michael Atkinson wrote that "Glawogger's film may be thematically loose-jointed, but Wolfgang Thaler's cinematography is the glue; the signature move—a flowing Steadicam track before or following a subject—blooms into variations on a visceral theme, especially as it rhymes the Nigerian butchers stalking through acres of red mud dragging bull heads with the Indonesians carrying rocks down smoking, tourist-littered mountain paths".

Awarding Body	Award	Nominee	Result
Directors Guild of America	Best Director - Documentary Feature	Michael Glawogger	Nominated
European Film Awards	Best Documentary	Michael Glawogger	Nominated
German Film Awards	Best Documentary	Pepe Danquart; Erich Lackner; Mirjam Quinte	Won
Gijón Film Festival	Special Jury Award		Won
Leipzig DOK Festival	FIPRESCI Prize		Won
London Film Festival	Grierson Award	Michael Glawogger	Won
Yerevan Festival	Golden Apricot for Best Documentary		Won

== See also ==
- Filmworks XVI: Workingman's Death, the film's soundtrack
