= Helmut Wimmer =

German painter

- Born: Helmut Karl Wimmer; December 8, 1925; Munich, Germany
- Died: March 20, 2006 (aged 80); Stuart, Florida
- Known for: Painting
- Notable work: Artist's Rendition of a Black Hole (1971)
- Spouse: Francie Schwaige

Helmut Wimmer (1925-2006) was a painter who, as the staff artist for New York's Hayden Planetarium from 1954 to 1987, created representations of cosmic vistas which were used during the planetarium shows.

Born in Munich, at the age of fourteen he was apprenticed to a sculptor and architectural model maker. Taken as a prisoner of war by the Russians while serving in the German army, his talents were noticed, and he was assigned to a team tasked with the repair of the ornamental plaster works of the government buildings in Gorky.

In addition to work used in planetarium shows, Wimmer provided illustrations for numerous astronomy books and text books, and his work frequently appeared in the American Museum's Natural History magazine. Of particular note is his 1971 illustration for Physics Today, entitled Artist's Rendition of a Black Hole - a "colorful schematic concept of black hole phenomena [which] has been copied extensively, sometimes without proper credit."

A painting depicting the close passage of a comet by Wimmer was used as the cover art for the album Mysterious Traveller, by the jazz fusion band Weather Report, released in 1974.

He also designed an educational children's board game entitled "Space Hop", which was published by Teaching Concepts in 1973. The game taught players about the Sun and its planets, moons, comets and asteroids.
