= Northern Skirts =

1999 Austrian film

- Directed by: Barbara Albert
- Written by: Barbara Albert
- Starring: Nina Proll
- Release date: 2 September 1999
- Running time: 103 minutes
- Countries: Austria; Germany; Switzerland
- Language: German

Northern Skirts (German: Nordrand) is a 1999 German-language film directed by Barbara Albert. It was an international co-production between Austria, Germany, and Switzerland. It was Austria's official Best Foreign Language Film submission at the 72nd Academy Awards, but did not manage to receive a nomination. The film addresses the marginalisation of the Vienna's migrant and ethnic minority population against the background of rising xenophobia encouraged by Joerg Haider and the so-called Freedom Party.

== Cast ==
- Nina Proll as Jasmin Schmid
- Edita Malovcic as Tamara
- Astrit Alihajdaraj as Senad
- Tudor Chirilă as Valentin
- Michael Tanczos as Roman
- Georg Friedrich as Wolfgang
- Martina Stojan as Sonja
- Marta Klubowicz as Jolanta
- Brigitte Kren as Gitti

== Reception ==
David Rooney of Variety wrote "Northern Skirts remains too fragmented in its presentation of characters and plot to bring its themes of family and emotional connection fully into focus".

== See also ==
- List of submissions to the 72nd Academy Awards for Best Foreign Language Film
- List of Austrian submissions for the Academy Award for Best Foreign Language Film
