= We Feed the World =

2005 Austrian documentary film

- Directed by: Erwin Wagenhofer
- Written by: Erwin Wagenhofer
- Produced by: Katharina Bogensberger; Helmut Grasser
- Cinematography: Erwin Wagenhofer
- Edited by: Erwin Wagenhofer
- Music by: Helmut Neugebauer
- Release dates: 10 September 2005 (Toronto Film Festival); 30 September 2005 (Austria)
- Running time: 96 minutes
- Country: Austria
- Languages: French; German; Portuguese; English

We Feed the World is a 2005 documentary film in which Austrian filmmaker Erwin Wagenhofer traces the origins of the food people eat and views modern industrial food production and factory farming in a critical light. His journey takes him to France, Spain, Romania, Switzerland, Brazil, and back to Austria. The film features interviews with several people, including one with sociologist and politician Jean Ziegler.

== Reception ==
A review for Variety by Joe Leydon refers to the documentary as "sincere but monotonous", noting issues with pacing and being "only sporadically effective at generating a genuine sense of outrage".
