= Coma (2009 film) =

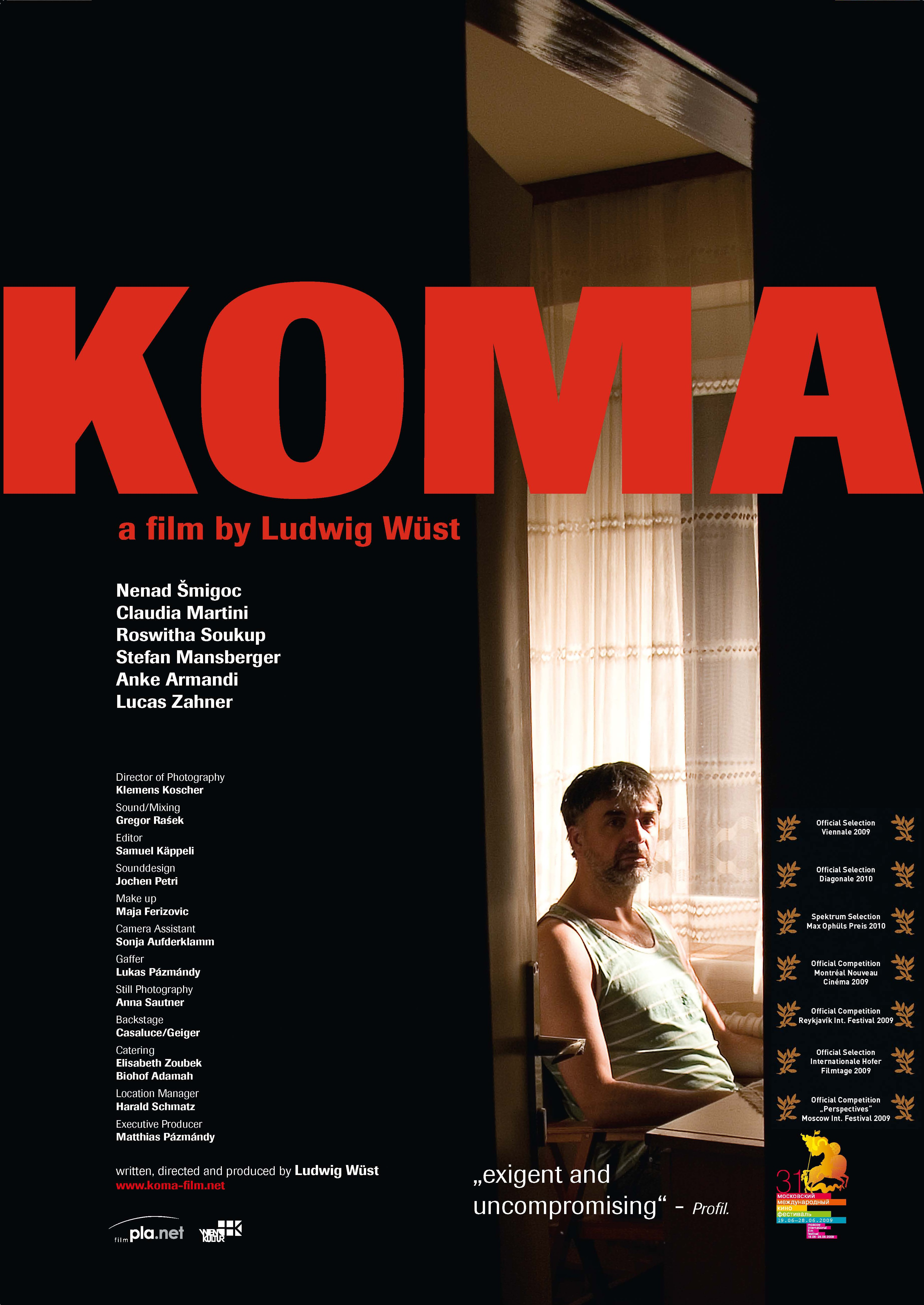
- Directed by: Ludwig Wüst
- Written by: Ludwig Wüst
- Produced by: Ludwig Wüst
- Starring: Nenad Šmigoc; Claudia Martini; Roswitha Soukup; Stefan Mansberger; Heinrich Herki; Daniela Gaets; Werner Landsgesell; Manfred Stella
- Cinematography: Klemens Koscher
- Edited by: Samuel Käppeli
- Distributed by: Stadtkino Filmverleih
- Release date: 26 June 2009
- Running time: 82 minutes
- Country: Austria
- Language: German

Coma (German: Koma) is a 2009 Austrian film written and directed by Ludwig Wüst.

The film premiered at the Moscow International Film Festival in 2009. It received critical acclaim particularly in the French Canadian press.

Due to his gloomy style director Ludwig Wüst is often compared with fellow Austrian directors Michael Haneke and Ulrich Seidl.

Coma is the first Austrian film and one of the first films in Europe that had a world-wide release on the internet as video on demand on the renowned cinema website mubi.com simultaneously with its theatrical release.

== Plot ==
Hans, a taxi driver lives in a small town near Vienna. When he is turning 50 his wife arranges a party with friends. But as the guests gather Hans wanders off into the forest and does not attend the party. Meanwhile his son is watching snuff videos with his friend Richy. Richy brings him a DVD with a video that shows a woman almost being beaten to death. Mistakenly his mother finds the DVD and takes it as a birthday present for his father and wraps it. After Hans has eventually returned home that night he finds the DVD and is confronted with his violent past.

He leaves the family and drives to Germany where he pays a prostitute to get information about Gertrud, a woman with whom he was able to fully play out his sadomasochistic fantasies. He eventually finds her in a hospital. She is in a vegetative state and takes her to his new home to take care of her. The film finishes with a love scene between the two.

== Cast ==
- Anke Armandi as Renate
- Thomas Fath as Customer
- Francesca Geiger as Guest at birthday party
- Marcus Geiger as Guest at birthday party
- Daniela Gäts as Neighbour
- Heinrich Herki as Guest at birthday party
- Werner Landsgesell as Guest at birthday party

== Critical reception ==
Following the world premiere at the Moscow International Film Festival 2009 the film had excellent reviews around the world, especially in the Canadian press after its North American premiere at the Festival du Nouveau Cinéma in Montréal. Le Lien Multimedia's Yves Tremblay noted:

Without falling into cheap violence the movie proves itself as exigent, sparse and confusing. Incidentally, the Austrian director has been rightly compared with compatriots Michael Haneke and Ulrich Seidl.

== Awards and Festivals ==
- Moscow International Film Festival (Competition)
- Reykjavík International Film Festival (Competition)
- Festival du Nouveau Cinéma (Competition)
- Saarbrücken Film Festival Max Ophüls Preis (Spektrum)
- Hof International Film Festival
- Vienna International Film Festival
- Diagonale (Competition)
- Split International Film Festival (Competition)
- Nordkapp Film Festival
- Tamil Nadu International Filmfestival: Best Film
