= Ludwig Wüst =

Austrian film director, scriptwriter and producer

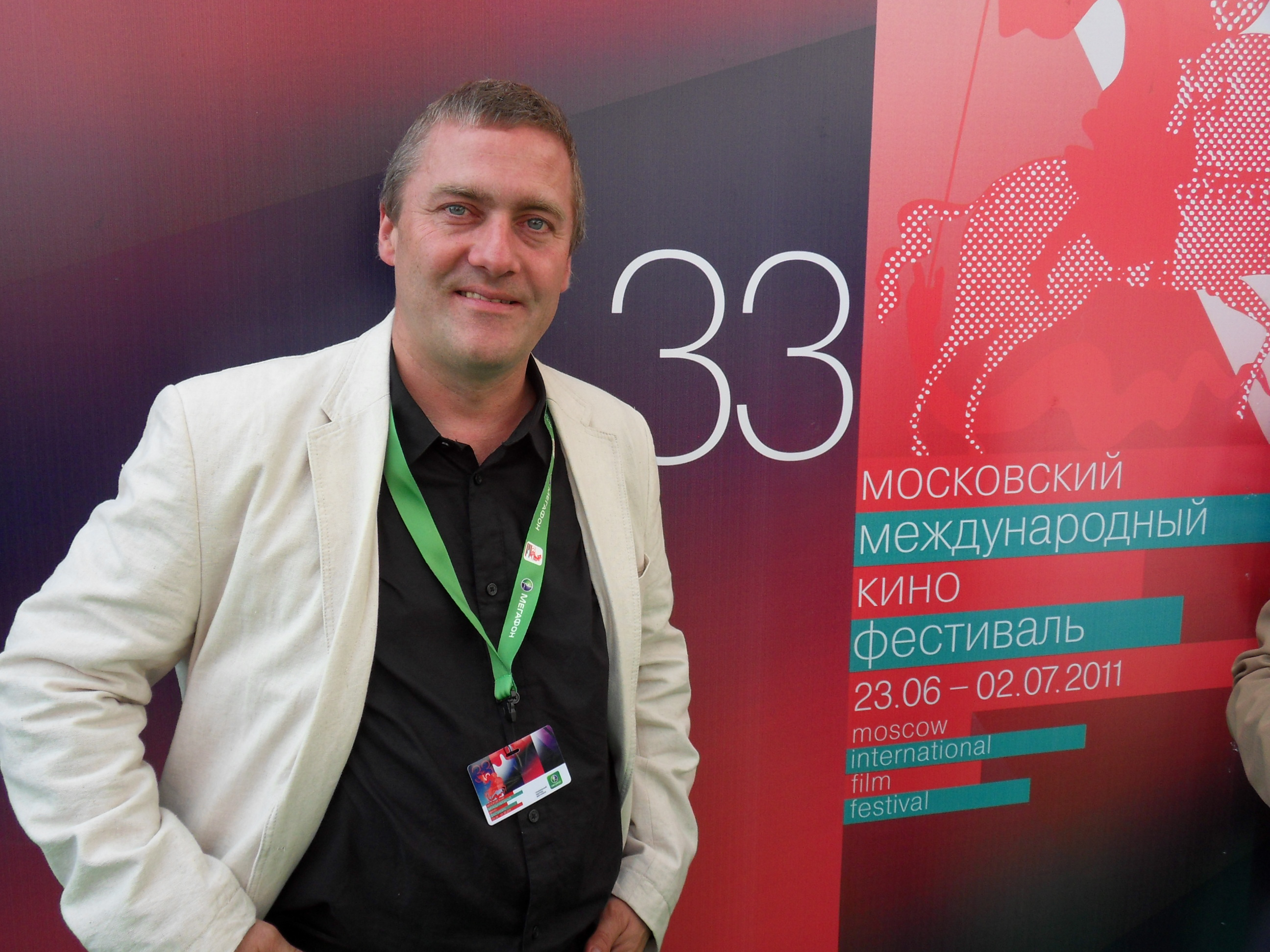
- Ludwig Wüst presenting TAPE END at the Moscow International Film Festival.
- Born: 29 April 1965 (age 61); Bavaria, Germany
- Education: University of Music and Performing Arts, Vienna

Ludwig Wüst is an Austrian film director, scriptwriter and producer.

== Biography ==
Wüst grew up in Bavaria, Germany. He moved to Vienna, where he studied acting and singing at the University of Music and Performing Arts. He has worked as theater director in Frankfurt, Berlin, the Opera Leipzig and in Vienna at the Wiener Festwochen.

In 1998, Wüst participated as an actor in the premiere of one of Hermann Nitsch's Orgien Mysterien Theater performances.

His first feature film KOMA (2009) raised a lot of attention from media and critics alike. Due to its realism, the style of his films has been compared to Michael Haneke, Ulrich Seidl or the Dardenne-brothers. His film TAPE END (2011) was shot in a single frame lasting 60 minutes without a single cut. During the actual shooting, director Wüst was not present at the set leaving the actors alone guided only by certain instructions.

The internet as a medium for film plays an important role in Wüst's work. The theatrical release of his debut feature KOMA in Austria happened simultaneously with a worldwide release as a video on demand on the internet.

For the short film PASOLINICODE02112011 Wüst went a step further in using the internet as a platform for films. On 2 November 2011, the anniversary of Pier Paolo Pasolini's death in Ostia, the film had its world premiere exclusively on the Internet. Later it was shown at film festival and as a video installation at the Kunsthalle Wien.

My Father's House was first presented to the public at the 21er Haus, the Austrian museum for the art of the 21st century. Its world premiere took place at the Karlovy Vary International Film Festival 2013. The film is both a work of its own as well as the pilot for the Heimatfilm-trilogy. The second film of the trilogy, Farewell, was presented in 2014, after a series of festival attendances, among them in Karlovy Vary, along with My Father's House at the Austrian Film Museum. The final part of the trilogy, Heimatfilm, had its World Premiere at the Diagonale in Graz and was also presented at the Austrian Film Museum. Heimatfilm is an anthology film about how people across different generations cope with the question of belonging and home.

Departure had its world premiere at the Berlinale.

The cinema Kino Arsenal at the Arsenal Institute for Film and Video Art in Berlin showed in 2019 a retrospective about Wüst’s films. The retrospective "Theater, Cinema, Wood" at the Diagonale in the same year covered for the first time Wüst’s entire work in cinema and theater as well as in wood working. As part of a cooperation between the film festival and the Graz Theater (Schauspielhaus) Wüst staged the play Miss Julie by August Strindberg.

His film 3.30 PM was entirely shot with a body camera and followed his concept of not being present during the actual shooting, already applied in "Tape End". The world premiere was at the Jeonju International Film Festival, South Korea. Further premiers followed at the Viennale and the Hof International Film Festival as part of a tribute to Wüst. For his innovative and radical cinematography concept, Wüst received the prize for Best Cinematography Feature Film from the Austrian Association of Cinematographers (AAC) at the Diagonale.

In his next work, Wüst experimented again with the format of his film and chose for the first time cine film. I AM HERE! was shot on 16 mm and had 2023 its world premiere at the Internationalen Filmfestival Rotterdam. At the Diagonale, Wüst was awarded the Kodak Analog Film Prize. The international filmfestival Filmadrid awarded Wüst with the prize for the best movie. In the same year his film ABC was screened at the Hof International Film Festival.

In the year 2024 #LOVE had its premiere at the Hof IFF. The film is mixing various genres, styles and formats, for instance split-screen, point-of-view camera perspectives or a dialogue via videocall.

In 2025 the Vienna Metro-Kino is presenting a one month long retrospective, giving an overview about twelve of his works.

== Films ==
- 2002: Egyptian Eclipse (Ägyptische Finsternis)
- 2005: Close-up (Nahaufnahme)
- 2006: Two Women (Zwei Frauen)
- 2007: Bon Voyage
- 2009: KOMA
- 2011: TAPE END
- 2012: PASOLINICODE02112011
- 2013: My Father's House (Das Haus meines Vaters)
- 2014: Farewell (Abschied)
- 2015: (no title)
- 2016: Heimatfilm
- 2018: Departure (Aufbruch)
- 2020: 3.30 PM
- 2023: I AM HERE!, ABC
- 2024: #LOVE

== Awards ==
- Moscow International Film Festival 2009 and 2011: Official Competition Perspective - KOMA and TAPE END
- Festival du nouveau cinéma Montréal 2009: Official Competition - KOMA
- Tamil Nadu International Film Festival 2009: Best Film for KOMA
- Max-Ophüls-Preis Saarbrücken 2010, 2014: Official Selection - KOMA and My Father's House
- Karlovy Vary International Film Festival 2013: Official Selection - My Father's House
- Berlinale Forum 2018: Official Selection - Aufbruch
- Diagonale 2020: Best Cinematography Feature Film from the Austrian Association of Cinematographers (AAC) - 3.30 PM
- Diagonale 2023: Kodak Analog Film Prize - I AM HERE!
- Filmadrid International Film Festival 2023: Best Film - I AM HERE!
