= Nikolaus Geyrhalter =

Austrian filmmaker (born 1972)

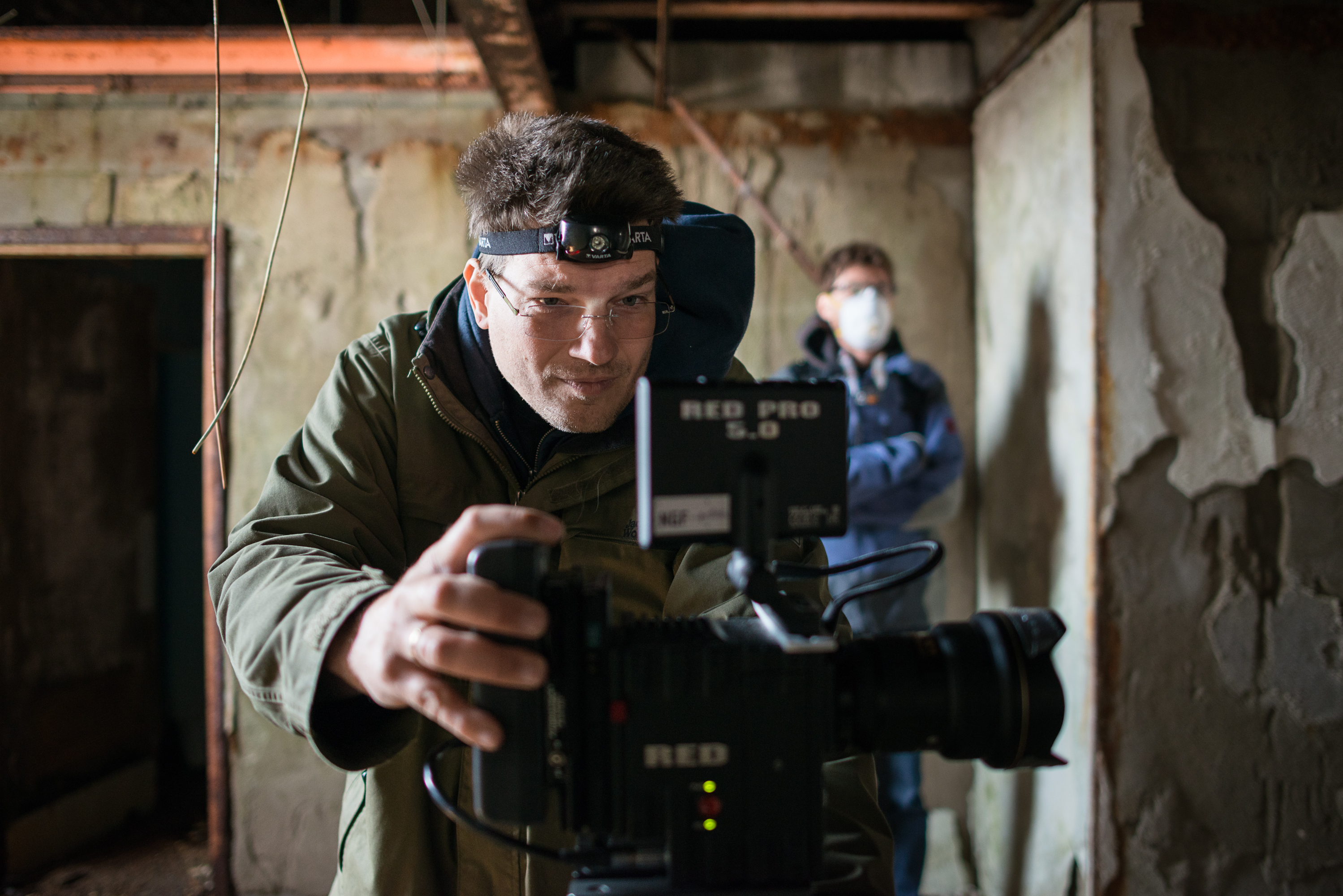
- Nikolaus Geyrhalter shooting a cinema documentary film.
- Born: 1972 (age 53–54); Vienna, Austria
- Occupations: Film director Cinematographer; Film producer
- Years active: 1992–present
- Organization: Nikolaus Geyrhalter Filmproduktion (NGF)
- Notable work: Our Daily Bread; Homo Sapiens; Earth
- Website: Nikolaus Geyrhalter Filmproduktion

Nikolaus Geyrhalter (born 1972) is an Austrian filmmaker. He has directed, produced, written, and worked as cinematographer for numerous documentaries. He has won awards for Das Jahr nach Dayton (1997), Pripyat (1999), Elsewhere (2001), and Our Daily Bread (2005).

== Life and career ==
Geyrhalter was born in Vienna, Austria in 1972. He formed his own production company at 22 years old. His first documentary was the 1994 film Washed Ashore (German: Angeschwemmt), about life on the Danube. He also filmed Pripyat (1999), a black-and-white look at residents who live near the Chernobyl Exclusion Zone in Ukraine. Elsewhere (2001) was a travelogue to a dozen different places around the world, and Our Daily Bread (2005) explored mechanical food production. 7915 Km (2008) looks at the Dakar Rally and the lives of racers and locals.

In 2023 the Munich International Documentary Film Festival dedicated an homage to his filmmaking.

== Filmography ==
- Eisenerz (1992) – director
- Angeschwemmt (1994) – director, producer, writer, cinematographer
- Das Jahr nach Dayton (1997) – director, writer, cinematographer
- Pripyat (1999) – director, producer, writer, cinematographer
- Elsewhere (2001) – director, producer, writer, cinematographer
- Fremde Kinder (2003) – director, producer, writer, cinematographer
- Our Daily Bread (2005) – director, producer, writer, cinematographer
- 7915 Km (2008) – director, producer, cinematographer
- Allentsteig (2010) – director
- Abendland (2011) – director, producer, writer, cinematographer
- Donauspital (2012) – director, producer, writer, cinematographer
- Homo Sapiens (2016) – director, producer, cinematographer
- Mademoiselle Paradis (2017) - producer
- Die Bauliche Massnahme (2018) – director, producer, cinematographer
- Earth (2019) – director, producer, cinematographer
- Matter Out of Place (2022) – director
- Melt (2025) – director, producer, cinematographer
