= Elsewhere (2001 film) =

2001 film by Nikolaus Geyrhalter

- Directed by: Nikolaus Geyrhalter
- Written by: Nikolaus Geyrhalter; Silvia Burner; Michael Kitzberger
- Produced by: Nikolaus Geyrhalter
- Cinematography: Nikolaus Geyrhalter
- Edited by: Wolfgang Widerhofer
- Release date: 2001
- Running time: 240 minutes (12 episodes)
- Languages: German; English; Greenlandic; Khanty; Korowai; Kunwinjku; Ladakhi; Naxi; Nisga'a; Ojihimba; Saami; Sardinian; Tamashek

Elsewhere is an Austrian documentary film in 12 episodes which describes life in twelve very different locations. During the year 2000 Nikolaus Geyrhalter and his teams travelled to different places each month, looking for places untouched by the millennium hysteria.

Locations:

- Ekeschi, Aïr, Niger
- Karlgasniemi, Sápmi, Finland
- Ombivango, Kunene, Namibia
- Dumbol Territory, Western New Guinea, Indonesia
- Siorapaluk, Thule, Greenland
- Manmoyi, Arnhem Land, Australia
- Umla, Ladakh, India
- Kantek ko jawun, Siberia, Russia
- Zhongshi [忠实], Yunnan, China
- Tharros, Sardinia, Italy
- Gitlaxt'aamiks, British Columbia, Canada
- Falalop, Woleai, Micronesia
