= Ruth Mader =

Austrian film director

- Born: 11 July 1974 (age 51); Vienna, Austria
- Occupations: Film director Screenwriter
- Years active: 1992-2003

Ruth Mader (born 11 July 1974) is an Austrian film director and screenwriter. She has directed six films between 1992 and 2003. Her film Struggle was screened in the Un Certain Regard section at the 2003 Cannes Film Festival.

== Filmography ==
- Endstation obdachlos (1992)
- Gatsch (1993)
- Kilometer 123,5 (1994)
- Gfrasta (1999)
- Null Defizit (2001)
- Struggle (2003)
- What Is Love (2012)
- Life Guidance (2017)
