= Let's Make Money =

- DVD cover
- Directed by: Erwin Wagenhofer
- Written by: Erwin Wagenhofer
- Produced by: Katharina Bogensberger and Helmut Grasser
- Release date: 2008
- Running time: 110 minutes
- Country: Austria
- Languages: German, Spanish, English, Tamil, French

Let's Make Money is an Austrian documentary by Erwin Wagenhofer released in 2008. It is about aspects of the development of the worldwide financial system, claiming that elitists economically exploit the rest of society, especially in the developing world, but also in western nations.

== Synopsis ==
The film starts by tracking the hypothetical savings of a typical depositor as they move around the global system, showing exploitation as various financial agents try to produce high returns. There are several interviews with investment managers, politicians, economists as well as homeless people and workers; the film sets them up as good guys and bad guys.

- Mark Mobius manages funds with a volume of about 12 billion dollars. He invests in emerging markets.
- Mirko Kovats is an investor and among the 15 richest Austrians. In the film he inspects an Indian firm.
- Terry Le Sueur is the finance minister of Jersey and explains the development of the island from agriculture and tourism to international financial center and tax haven.
- Hermann Scheer is member of the German parliament and criticizes the financial system.
- John Perkins claims he was an "Economic Hitman (EHM)" and describes US politics in developing countries based on economic interests.

== Reception ==
Writing in the Financial Times, Christopher Caldwell praised the film's beauty, going on to state that Wagenhofer has a perfect sense for pictorial composition and even for sound. He also writes that film is an imperfect medium for providing an accurate view of complex economic developments. Caldwell goes on to say that "Let's Make Money is not a serious alternative economic argument. It is nonetheless a film of overwhelming power. It resembles an art film such as Koyaanisqatsi, Godfrey Reggio's haunting, wordless indictment of the frenzy of modern life".

== See also ==
- The Corporation
- Capitalism: A Love Story
- Debtocracy
- Generation Zero
- Inside Job
- I.O.U.S.A.
- Too Big to Fail (film)
