= Contact High (film) =

- Directed by: Michael Glawogger
- Starring: Michael Ostrowski; Raimund Wallisch
- Release date: 20 March 2009
- Running time: 98 minutes
- Country: Austria
- Language: German

Contact High is a 2009 Austrian comedy film directed by Michael Glawogger and starring Michael Ostrowski and Raimund Wallisch. The film showed at the 44th Karlovy Vary International Film Festival in 2009 out of competition.

== Cast ==
- Michael Ostrowski as Max
- Raimund Wallisch as Johann
- Pia Hierzegger as Mao
- Georg Friedrich as Schorsch
- Detlev Buck as Harry
