= Erwin Wagenhofer =

Austrian screenwriter and film director

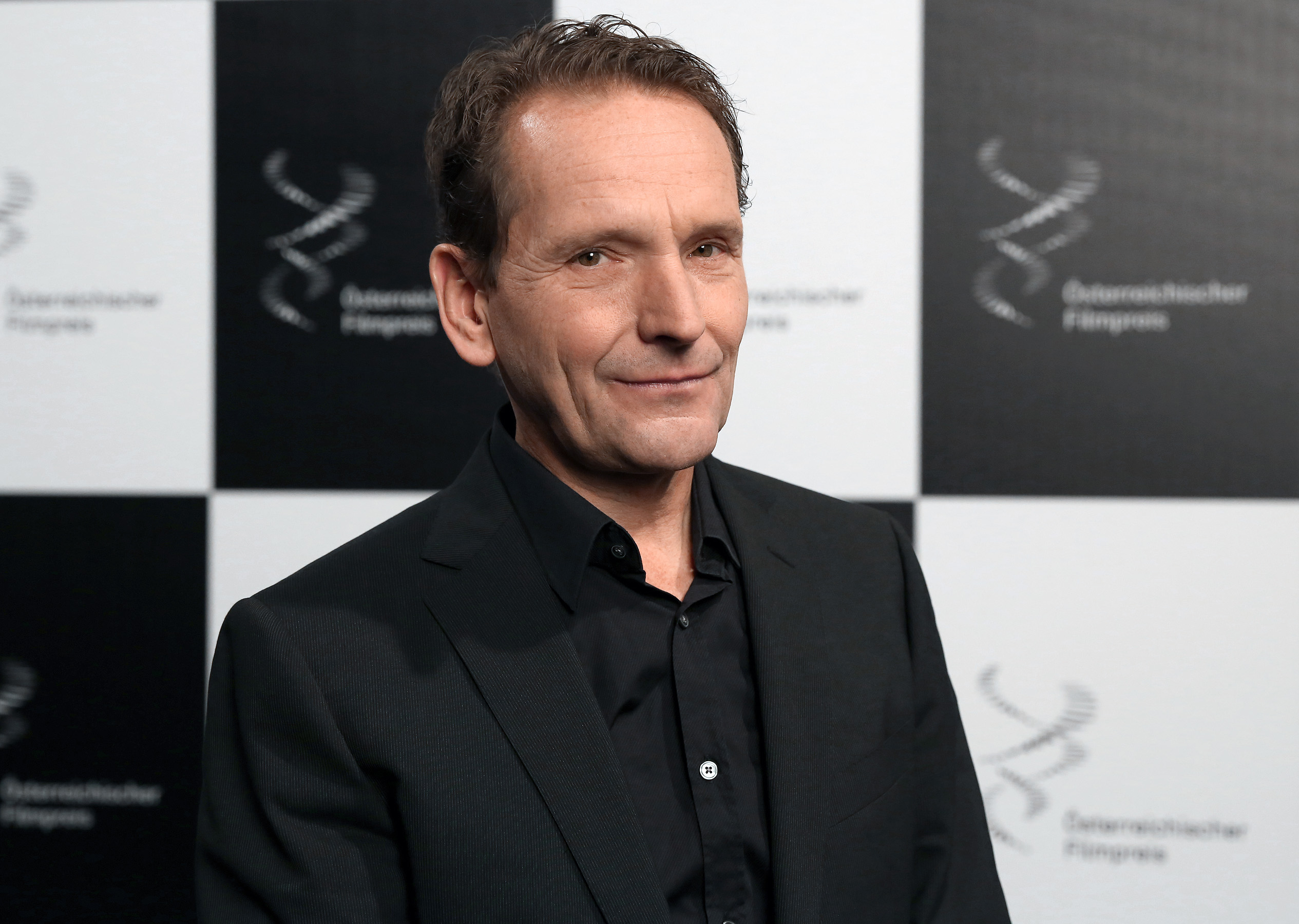
- Wagenhofer at the 2014 Austrian Film Awards
- Born: 27 May 1961 (age 64); Amstetten, Austria
- Occupation: Filmmaker
- Years active: 1981–present

Erwin Wagenhofer (born 27 May 1961) is an Austrian author and film director.

In 1981 he presented his first short film Endstation normal. Two years later his short film Das Loch was shown at the Kraków Film Festival. From that year until 1987 he worked as a directing and camera assistant for several ORF productions as well as for movies and documentaries. Since 1987 he is a freelance author and film director. In 1988 he portrayed the artist Oswald Oberhuber in Das Fragmentarische in der Kunst.

From 1995 to 2000 he taught at the Danube University in Krems. Since 2002 he has been teaching at the University of Applied Arts Vienna. Since 2001 he completed several scripts for movies and documentaries.

In 2005 Wagenhofer directed the long documentary We Feed the World. It is about industrialization of food production and shows international agricultural politics from a critical viewpoint, especially with regard to the role of the European Union. The film was seen by more than 800,000 people in Europe. It was shown at numerous festivals and won several prizes. In October 2008 his next documentary Let's Make Money was released in Germany and Austria. It is about money in a global financial system and unequal distribution of wealth. He won the German Documentary Film Prize in 2009.

== Filmography ==
short films:

- 1981: Endstation normal
- 1982: Der stumme Frühling
- 1983: Das Loch
- 2001: Limes... Aktion Limes (documentary)
- 2002: Moving Vienna (documentary)
- 2002: Agnes ...

TV productions (selection):

- 1988: Das Fragmentarische in der Kunst
- 1990: Wettertanz
- 1995: Chasing After The Molecule (documentary)
- 1997: Off Screen
- 1998: Menschen am Fluss (documentary)
- 1999: Die vergorene Heimat
- 1999: Daheim in Europa (documentary)
- 2000: Der Gebrauch des Menschen
- 2003: Operation Figurini (documentary)

cinema:

- 2005: We Feed the World (documentary, 100 min)
- 2008: Let's Make Money (documentary, 110 min)
- 2011: Black Brown White (feature film, 106 min)
- 2013: Alphabet (documentary, 113 min)
- 2019: But Beautiful (documentary, 116 min)

== Awards ==
- Motovun Film Festival 2006
- FIPRESCI Prize for We Feed the World
- Amnesty International Human Rights Award
- German Documentary Film Prize 2009
