= Free Radicals (2003 film) =

2003 film

- German: Böse Zellen
- Directed by: Barbara Albert
- Written by: Barbara Albert
- Starring: Kathrin Resetarits
- Distributed by: Polyfilm Verleih GmbH; Kino International; Ventura Film
- Release date: 2003
- Running time: 120 minutes
- Country: Austria
- Language: German

Free Radicals (German: Böse Zellen) is an Austrian film.

== Plot ==
Following the death of Manu (Resetarits) in a car accident, the film relates the interwoven stories of several people who become indirectly connected by the events and aftermath of the crash.
