= Barbara Albert =

Austrian film director, screenwriter and producer

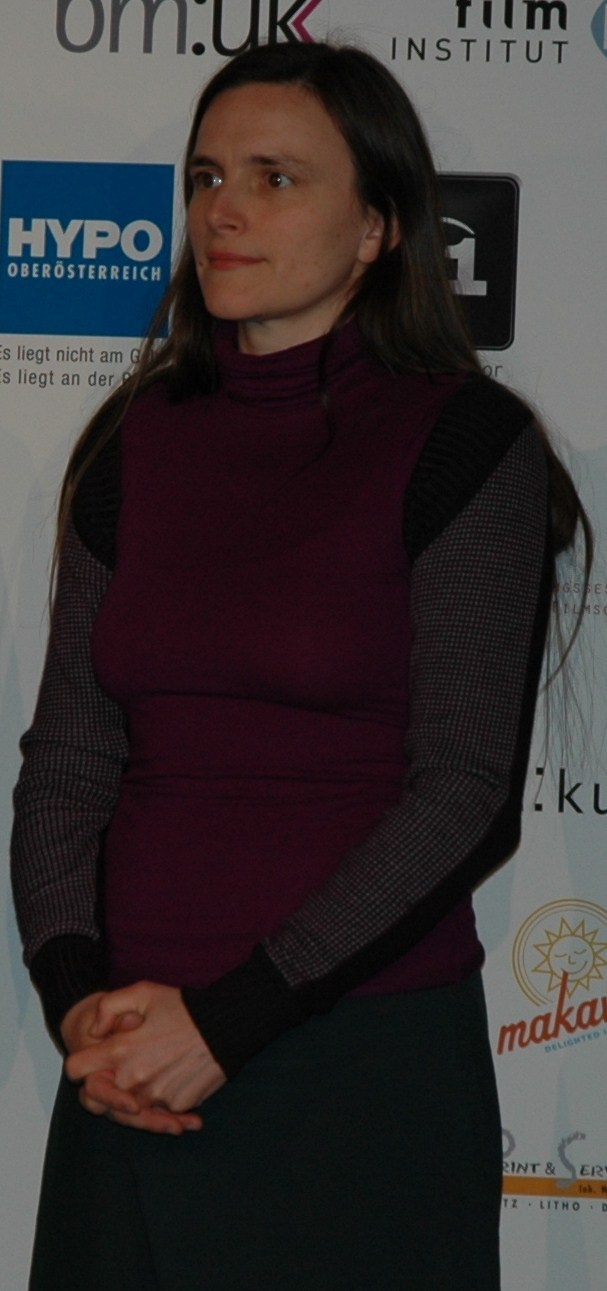
- Albert at the Crossing Europe film festival in 2010
- Born: 1970 (age 55–56); Vienna, Austria
- Education: Film Academy Vienna
- Occupations: Film director; screenwriter; film producer

Barbara Albert (born 1970) is an Austrian film director, screenwriter and producer. Her feature films include Northern Skirts (1999), Free Radicals (2003), Fallen (2006), Die Lebenden (2012), Mademoiselle Paradis (2017) and Blind at Heart (2023). She was a co-founder of the Austrian production company coop99 and of the Austrian Film Academy. Since 2023 she has been a professor of directing at the Film Academy Vienna, where she was appointed head of the institute in 2025.

== Career ==
Albert was born in Vienna in 1970. She studied German philology, journalism and theatre studies before studying directing and screenwriting at the Film Academy Vienna. During her studies she also worked as an assistant director, script supervisor and actor.

Her short film Die Frucht deines Leibes was shown in the Finestra sulle Immagini programme at the Venice Film Festival in 1996. Her first feature film as director and screenwriter, Nordrand (1999), follows the friendship between an Austrian woman and a Serbian immigrant in Vienna. It screened in competition at the Venice Film Festival and won both the Vienna Film Award and the FIPRESCI Prize at the 1999 Viennale. Lead actress Nina Proll received the Marcello Mastroianni Award for her performance at Venice.

In 1999, Albert co-founded the independent production company coop99 with Jessica Hausner, Antonin Svoboda and Martin Gschlacht. In addition to directing her own films, she worked as a screenwriter and producer on other Austrian and European productions. Her credits include producing Darwin's Nightmare, co-writing and producing Jasmila Žbanić's Grbavica, and writing Michael Glawogger's Slumming.

Albert's second feature as director, Böse Zellen / Free Radicals, screened in competition at the Locarno Film Festival in 2003. She followed it with Fallen, which competed at the Venice Film Festival in 2006.

In 2009, Albert was among the co-founders of the Austrian Film Academy. Her 2012 feature Die Lebenden (The Dead and the Living), which she wrote, directed and produced, screened in the Official Selection of the San Sebastián International Film Festival. That year she received the Austrian Art Prize for Film for her body of work.

In 2013, Albert became professor of feature-film directing at the Film University Babelsberg KONRAD WOLF, a position she held until 2023. Her next feature, Mademoiselle Paradis (Licht, 2017), premiered at the Toronto International Film Festival and later competed in the Official Selection at San Sebastián.

Albert directed and co-wrote Blind at Heart (Die Mittagsfrau, 2023), an adaptation of Julia Franck's novel Die Mittagsfrau. The film competed at the 2023 Tokyo International Film Festival.

On 1 October 2023, Albert returned to the Film Academy Vienna as professor of directing, succeeding Michael Haneke. In November 2025, she was appointed head of the Film Academy, succeeding Danny Krausz.

In 2024, Albert's television project Sleeping Swans, written by Ulrike Tony Vahl and produced by Martina Haubrich, received the €20,000 Kirch Foundation/HFF Award at the SERIESMAKERS programme of Series Mania.

== Selected filmography ==
Selected directing, writing and producing credits include:

Year	Title	Role
1993	Nachtschwalben	Director
1996	Die Frucht deines Leibes	Director, writer, editor, producer
1999	Nordrand	Director, writer
2003	Böse Zellen / Free Radicals	Director, writer
2004	Darwin's Nightmare	Producer
2006	Grbavica	Co-writer, producer
2006	Slumming	Writer
2006	Fallen	Director, writer, producer
2012	Die Lebenden (The Dead and the Living)	Director, writer, producer
2017	Mademoiselle Paradis (Licht)	Director
2020	Quo Vadis, Aida?	Co-producer
2022	Funeral for a Dog	Director
2023	Blind at Heart (Die Mittagsfrau)	Director, co-writer

== Awards and recognition ==
- 1999: Vienna Film Award and FIPRESCI Prize at the Viennale for Nordrand.
- 2012: Austrian Art Prize for Film.
- 2013: Film Award of the City of Hof.
- 2024: Kirch Foundation/HFF Award at SERIESMAKERS for the series project Sleeping Swans.
