= Michael Glawogger =

Austrian film director, screenwriter and cinematographer (1959–2014)

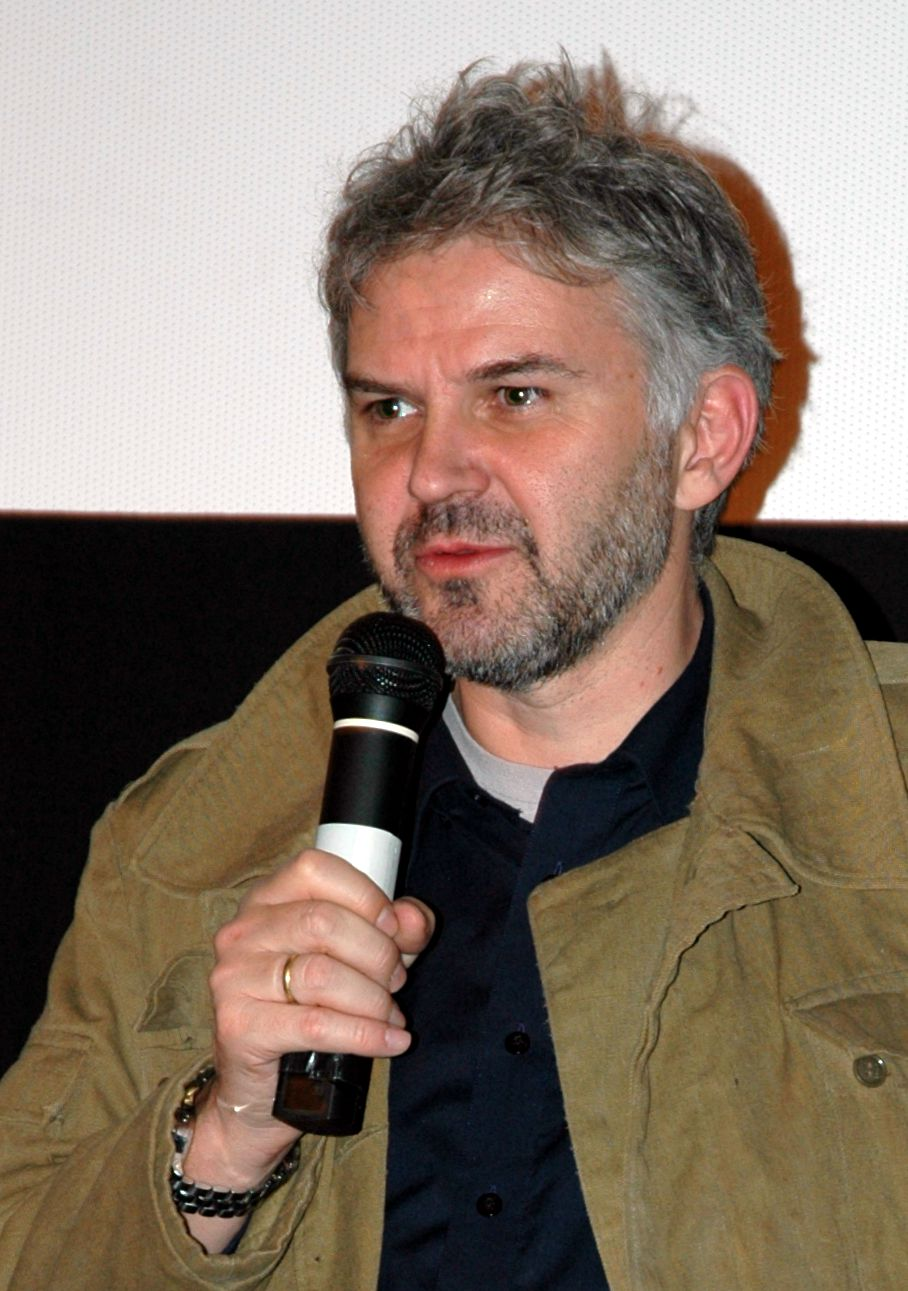
Glawogger in November 2006

Michael Glawogger (3 December 1959 – 23 April 2014) was an Austrian film director, screenwriter and cinematographer, born in Graz.

From 1981 to 1982, Glawogger studied at the San Francisco Art Institute, and from 1983 to 1989 at the Vienna Film Academy. Like fellow Austrian director Ulrich Seidl, with whom he collaborated several times, he was mainly known for his documentary films, such as Megacities (1998), Workingman's Death (2005) and Whores' Glory (2011). In 2008 he was a member of the jury at the 30th Moscow International Film Festival.

== Other works ==
In 2013, Glawogger contributed one chapter to Cathedrals of Culture, a 3-D film on architecture produced by Wim Wenders.

== Death and legacy ==
Four days after incorrectly being diagnosed with typhus, he died from malaria on 22 April 2014 shortly before midnight in Monrovia, Liberia during a movie production.

In February 2015, a book of stories entitled 69 Hotelzimmer was released. The stories used hotel rooms Glawogger had visited (or in some cases only heard about in passing) as a departure for stories that reflect the visual richness for which his films are celebrated.

== Filmography ==
- 1989 – War in Vienna (Krieg in Wien; documentary)
- 1995 – Ant Street (Die Ameisenstraße)
- 1996 – Movies in the Mind (Kino im Kopf; documentary)
- 1998 – Megacities (documentary)
- 2000 – France, Here We Come! (Frankreich, wir kommen; documentary)
- 2002 – State of the Nation: Austria in Six Chapters (documentary)
- 2004 – Slugs (Nacktschnecken)
- 2005 – Workingman's Death (documentary)
- 2006 – Slumming
- 2009 – Kill Daddy Good Night (Das Vaterspiel)
- 2009 – Contact High
- 2011 – Whores' Glory (documentary)
- 2011 – 60 Seconds of Solitude in Year Zero (documentary)
- 2017 - Untitled (documentary, posthumously realized and edited by Monika Willi)
