= Pamela Knaack =

German actress

- Born: Pamela Knaack; 12 August 1963 (age 61); Hamburg, West Germany
- Occupation: Actress
- Years active: 1992–present

Pamela Knaack (born 12 August 1963) is a German television and stage actress.

Born in Hamburg, Knaack plays the mother of Katrin in Katrin und die Welt der Tiere, which has been running since 1 January 2009 on Super RTL in Germany.

Knaack studied acting in New York City. She had her first engagement at the Deutsches Schauspielhaus in Hamburg in 1987. Knaack also played the role of Alma Mahler-Werfel in Yehoshua Sobol's poly drama Alma at the Bremen Theater am Goetheplatz and the Vienna Festival.

== Filmography ==
- 1989: Tatort – Keine Tricks, Herr Bülow (directed by Jürgen Roland)
- 1991: Tatort – Tod eines Mädchens (directed by Jürgen Roland)
- 1992: Tatort – Stoevers Fall (directed by Jürgen Roland)
- 1998: Alma (TV miniseries, based on the eponymous play; directed by Paulus Manker)
- 2001: Heart, as Dora Michaelis
- 2003: Tatort – Bienzle und der Tod im Teig (directed by Hartmut Griesmayr)
- 2006: Polizeiruf 110 – Kleine Frau (directed by Andreas Kleinert)
- 2009–2010: Katrin und die Welt der Tiere
- 2012: Tatort – Hochzeitsnacht (directed by Florian Baxmeyer)
- 2017: Fack ju Göhte 3 (directed by Bora Dağtekin)
