= Franz Josef Altenburg =

Austrian ceramicist and sculptor (1941–2021)

- Born: Franz Josef Georg Clemens Maria Leopold Salvator, Prince of Altenburg; 15 March 1941; Kaiservilla, Bad Ischl, Reichsgau Oberdonau, Ostmark
- Died: 18 August 2021 (aged 80); Schlatt, Austria
- Education: Kunstgewerbeschule in Graz
- Occupations: Ceramicist; Sculptor
- Parent: Clemens Salvator, Prince of Altenburg
- Awards: Decoration of Honour for Services to the Republic of Austria

Franz Josef Georg Clemens Maria Leopold Salvator, Prince of Altenburg (15 March 1941 – 18 August 2021) was an Austrian ceramicist and sculptor. He was a member of the House of Habsburg-Lorraine (Austria-Tuscany branch). He was regarded as a leading modern ceramicist of Austria, and received awards including the Decoration of Honour for Services to the Republic of Austria.

== Life and career ==
Altenburg was born into the nobility at the Kaiservilla in Bad Ischl, the seventh of nine children of Clemens Salvator, Prince of Altenburg, and his wife Elisabeth, Countess Rességuier de Miremont. He studied at the Kunstgewerbeschule in Graz, the school of applied arts from 1958 to 1962, with Hans Adametz. He met the ceramicist Gudrun Baudisch-Wittke, with whom he worked in the Hallstätter Keramik workshop from 1962 to 1964. He studied further at the school of ceramics in Faenza. In 1967, he became Meister in Hafnergewerbe (master of ceramics). He took study tours to foreign masters, such as in 1968 to Jean Claude de Crousaz in Geneva. That year, he was granted an atelier (workshop) by Johannes von Hohenberg at the Gmundner Keramik manufacturer, where he worked as a freelance artist until 1993. During this time, he became a member of the Gruppe H, founded by Hohenberg and Baudisch-Wittke, which at a time also included Anton Raidel (1943–2019) and Wolfgang von Wersin. Altenburg was a member of the Kunstforum Salzkammergut. He is regarded as one of the most prominent modern ceramics artists in Austria.

Most of Altenburg's works are held by Oberösterreich, with exhibitions at the Landesgalerie Linz. He created ceramics for Stations of the Cross and a holy-water font for the Am Schöpfwerk Church in Vienna, a ceramic Cross for an exterior wall of the Schlosskapelle Mitterberg, and an altar for Schiedlberg Parish Church.

Altenburg lived and worked in Breitenschützing, in the municipality of Schlatt. His first exhibition in Museum of Applied Arts, Vienna (MAK) was Elemente, Objekte. Keramiken von Franz Josef Altenburg (curated by Christian Witt-Dörring) in 2001. In 2021, Block, Haus, Turm, Gerüst, Rahmen (Block, house, tower, scaffolding, frame) was the name of the last MAK exhibition. On the occasion of his 80th birthday in 2021, he was awarded the Decoration of Honour for Services to the Republic of Austria. An exhibition of his works was held at the Kaiservilla where he was born; titled Ton und Form (Clay and form), it showed 50 objects from his long career. He died on 18 August 2021 at age 80.

== Awards ==
- 1972: Concorso internationale della Ceramica d’Arte contemporanea, Gold medal, Faenza, Italy
- 1989: Kulturpreis des Landes Oberösterreich for sculpture (Bildende Kunst)
- 1993: Salzburg Award for Ceramic Art, acknowledgement prize
- 2010: Heinrich Gleißner Prize
- 2021: Decoration of Honour for Services to the Republic of Austria

== Marriage and issue ==
Altenburg was the seventh of nine children of Clemens Salvator, Prince of Altenburg, formerly Archduke of Austria-Tuscany, and his morganatic wife Elisabeth, Countess Rességuier de Miremont, paternal grandson of Archduke Franz Salvator of Austria and his wife Archduchess Marie Valerie of Austria and maternal grandson of Friedrich Bernard, Graf Rességuier de Miremont, and wife Christiane, Gräfin von Wolkenstein-Trostburg.

Altenburg married Christa, Baronin von Haerdtl (Sankt Veit an der Glan, 29 January 1945) in Klagenfurt on 3 May 1969. She was the daughter of Thomas, Baron von Haerdtl, and his wife Ilse von Burger-Scheidlin. They had four children:

- Maria Caecilia Elisabeth Therese Margarete, Princess of Altenburg (Gmunden, 2 April 1970), married in 2011 Peter Putschek; they have one daughter Maria Putschek (2012)
- Augustin Franz Josef Maria Clemens Georg Salvator, Prince of Altenburg (Gmunden, 27 October 1971 – Vienna, 22 July 2006), married in Neukirchen bei Lambach on 16 August 2003 Nikzad Zihai (Tehran, Iran, 28 July 1972), without issue
- Amalia Maria Elisabeth, Princess of Altenburg (Vöcklabruck, 13 January 1979), married in 2011 Fábio Coutinho Geraldo (Brazil)
- Elisabeth Maria Caecilia Amalia Katharina, Princess of Altenburg (Vöcklabruck, 9 June 1983), unmarried and without issue

== Publications ==
- Edition Cuturi (ed.), Franz Josef Altenburg – Keramik, Linz 1991, ISBN 3-85358-103-X
- Peter Noever, Franz Josef Czernin, Bodo Hell: Elemente, Objekte: Keramiken von Franz Josef Altenburg. Museum of Applied Arts, Vienna, 2001, ISBN 3-900688-48-6.
- Martin Hochleitner: Aus der Sammlung: Franz Josef Altenburg. Ausstellungskatalog, Landesgalerie Linz, Weitra 2006, ISBN 978-3-902414-26-7.
- Karl Muhr (ed.), Franz Josef Altenburg – Ein Leben für die Keramik, Neukirchen 2019, ISBN 978-3-9504422-1-2
- Alfred Weidinger, Christoph Thun-Hohenstein, Rainald Franz (eds.), Franz Josef Altenburg – Ton und Form/Clay and Form, arnoldsche Art Publishers, 2021, ISBN 978-3-89790-646-4
