= Lisa Fischer (historian) =

Austrian historian

Lisa Fischer (born 27 May 1959 in Vienna) is an Austrian historian and social scientist specialising in women's history, best known for her biographies on Lina Loos, Herta Staub, Anna-Lülja Praun, and Margarete Depner.
