= Maria Baumgartner =

Austrian ceramist

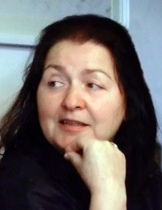
Maria Baumgartner

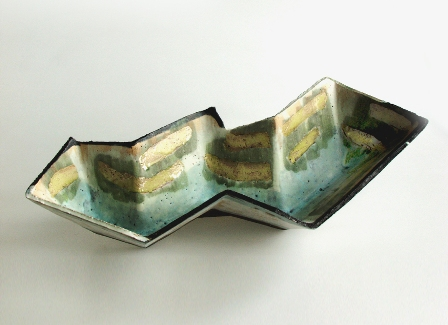
Object "Umbal 2001" by Maria Baumgartner

Maria Baumgartner (born 13 March 1952 in Königswiesen, Austria) is an Austrian studio potter and was professor of ceramics at the University of Arts and Industrial Design Linz.

== Biography ==
From 1972 to 1979 Maria Baumgartner studied ceramics at the University of Arts and Industrial Design Linz and graduated as Master of Fine Arts. 1980 she founded her first studio near Lienz/ Tirol and worked there as freelance artist until 2014. 1986 she additionally started working as Assistant professor at the University of Arts and Industrial Design Linz and continued her career there as Associate professor until her retirement in 2014. 2015 she founded a new studio in Puchenau near Linz. Besides being artist and professor she also acted as curator and academic author in the field of ceramic art.

== Work ==
As artist she won awards, prizes and grants in Austria, Germany, Croatia und Hungary. She participated in 40 personal and 140 group exhibitions in Austria, Germany, Switzerland, France, Italy, Belgium, Czechia, Spain, Denmark, Hungary, Lithuania, Croatia, Latvia, Turkey, Egypt, USA, Korea and Japan. Her artworks can be found in several art museums and other well known public or private art collections, like the Museum of Applied Arts, Vienna, the Museum of Design, Zürich, Sèvres – Cité de la céramique, France, the Igal & Diane Silber Collection, Laguna Beach/ Cal., the American Museum of Ceramic Art, Pomona/Cal., the Panevėžys Civic Art Gallery (Lithuania), the International Ceramics Studio in Kecskemét (Hungary), the Museum of Modern Ceramic Art, Mino Ceramic Park, Gifu (Japan), the Grassi Museum, Leipzig, or the collection of the Veste Coburg.

Maria Baumgartner herself writes about her recent objects of ceramic art: "My objects are each built up and hand-formed to their individual shape. The surface is smoothed only partially. This free development of the ceramic form can be seen in the sometimes dissolving rims and in the often thin-walled shells of the objects. The forms are inspired by an architectural aesthetic, hinting at vertical axes, playing with orthogonal or other geometric structures, but deconstructing, tilting and intertwining them. Thus a positive disquiet can be experienced. The entire surface of the ceramic objects is worked out in multiple layering by paintbrush, sgraffito or other pictorial techniques. Aim is to reach the impression of »three-dimensional paintings«"

The following pictures show this formative development of the ceramic sculptural objects by Maria Baumgartner: starting from experimenting with circular or cylindrical forms (figure 1), she developed more complicated objects, using thin-walled wavelike shapes with experimental glazes (figure 2), or more solid houselike structures with straight angles (figures 3, 4). Now her objects are a free combination of various geometric shapes and conceptional graphics (figure 5)

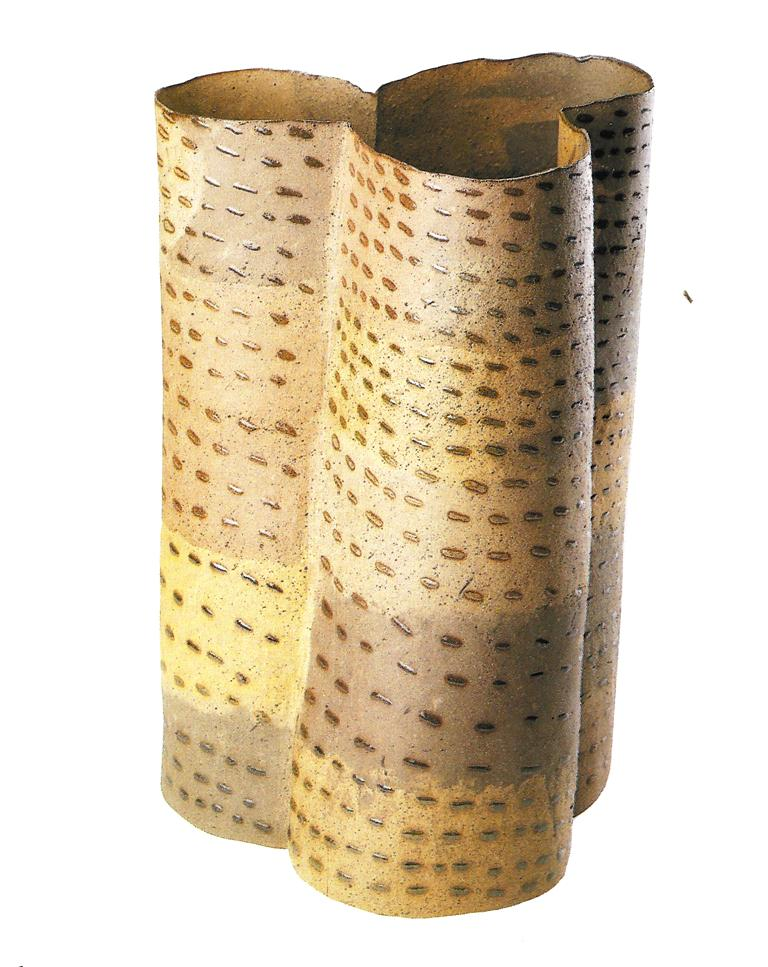
fig.1 "Trefoil 1991" (Austrian state prize)

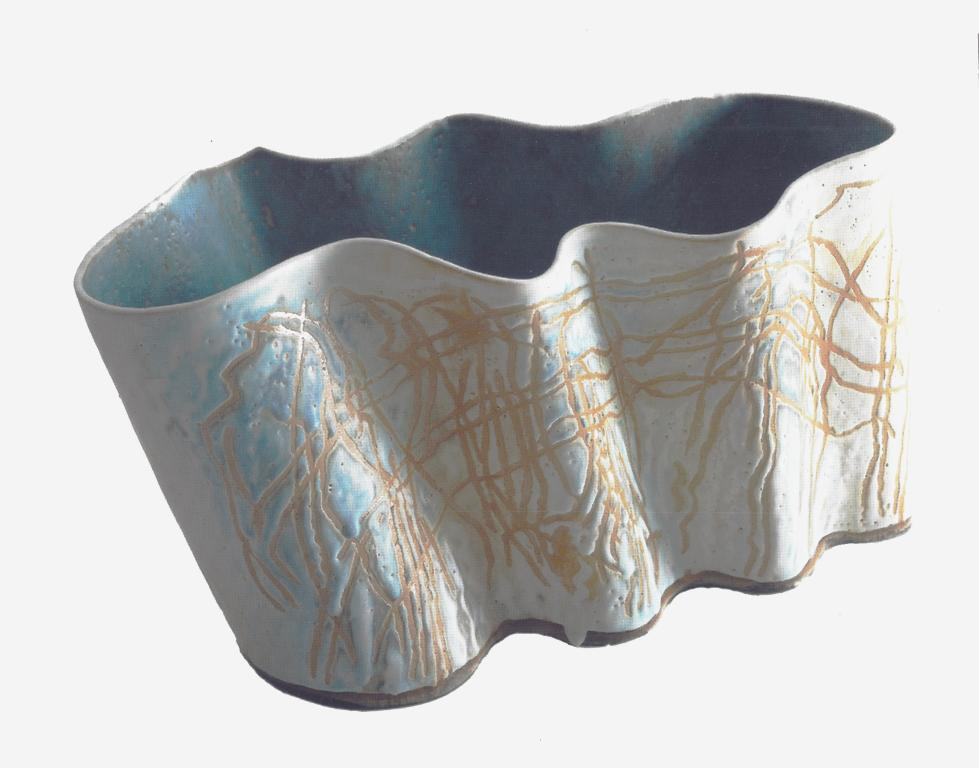
fig.2 "Blue and Lines 1998"

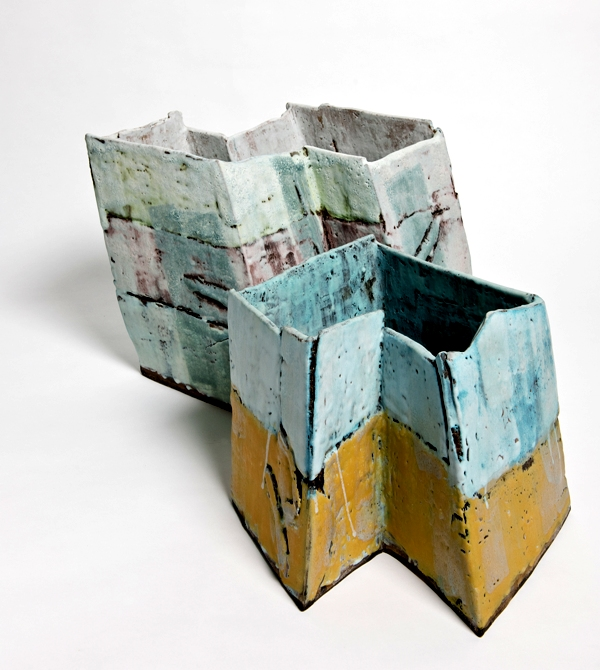
fig.3 "House I & II 2010"

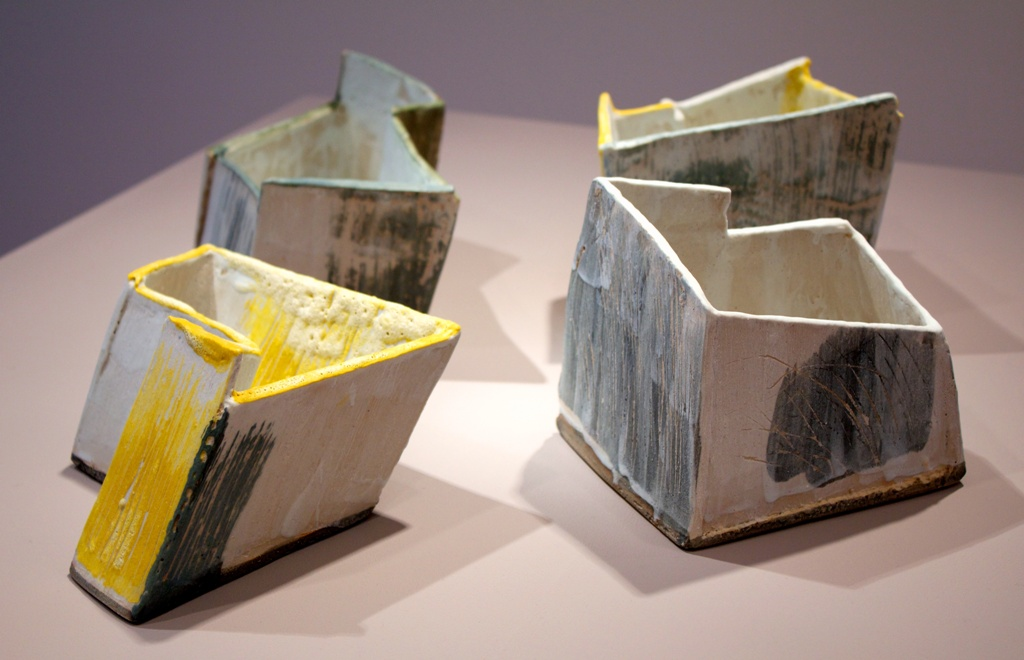
fig.4 "1000 grams 2012"

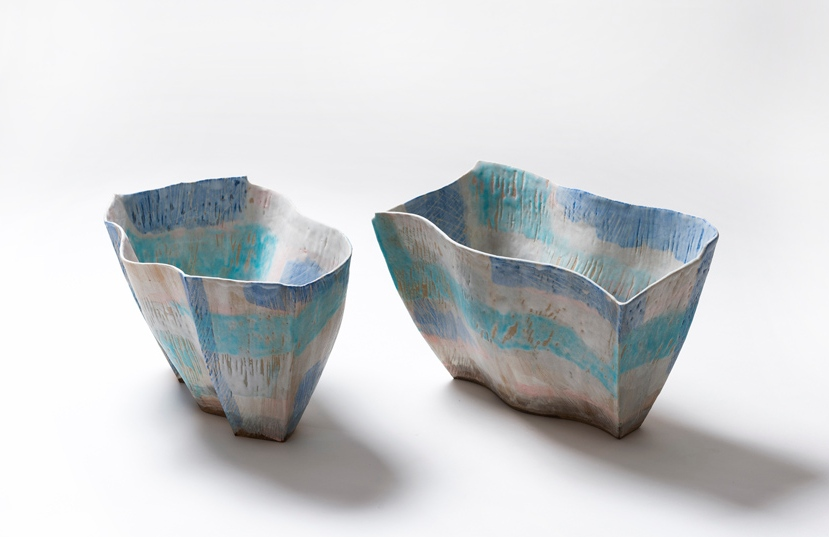
fig.5 "Waves 2016"

== Internationally significant awards (a selection) ==
- 1991 Austrian State Prize for Design ("österr. Staatspreis für gestaltendes Handwerk") (winner)
- 1993 Nagrada (award) "Slavonski Brod" (= Medal "New Positions") (winner), 4. Svetski Triennale Male Keramike, Zagreb/ Croatia.
- 1998 Salzburg Award for Ceramic Art ("Salzburger Keramikpreis", winner).
- 2020: GRACIS 2020. Zagreb, Zelina award: silver medal.

== Internationally significant exhibitions (a selection) ==
- 1984 Ceramics and Porcelain, Gallery "Galerie Thaddaeus Ropac", then Lienz (solo).
- 1986 European Contemporary Ceramics, Ceramics museum "Keramion", Frechen near Cologne. (group).
- 1989 L’Europe des Ceramistes. Actualité de la Céramique Européenne, Abbey of Saint-Germain d'Auxerre/ FRA (and other places).(group).
- 1992 Maria Baumgartner: Ceramics, Gallery "L im Heine-Haus Hamburg", Hamburg/ BRD (solo).
- 1993 4th World Triennial Exhibition of Small Ceramics, Meštrović Pavilion, Zagreb/ CRO (group).
- 1994 The 2nd Cairo International Biennale for Ceramics, Zamalek Art Gallery, Cairo/ EGY.(group).
- 1998 International Contemporary Ceramics from the Igal and Diane Silber Collection, Laguna Art Museum, Laguna Beach/ Cal.(group).
- 2000 Maria Baumgartner: New Ceramics, Gallery "b15", Munich/ BRD(solo).
- 2000, 2001 SOFA Art Fair, exhibition there by the gallery "b15 - Renate Wunderle" New York/NY & Chicago/Ill./USA(group).
- 2007 Modern Ceramics from Central Europe – A Focus on Hungary, the Czech Republic and Greater Central Europe, Museum of Modern Ceramic Art, Gifu/ JAP.(group).
- 2010 A Plentiful Portion, Gallery "Kulturkeller Schloss Dobersberg"/AT(solo).
- 2016 Heritage and Diversity. East and West Invitational Ceramic Exhibition, Hanyang University Museum, Seoul/ (group).
- 2017 Ceramics out of Passion: Kurt Ohnsorg, Günther Praschak, Maria Baumgartner and others, Lower Austrian Centre of Modern Arts, Sankt Pölten/ AUT. (group).
- 2020 G.R.A.C.I.S. 2020 (Ceramics from Germany, Romania, Austria, Croatia, Italy, Slovenia), Zvonimir Gallery, Zagreb. (group).
- 2023 From a Gift to a Collection: Igal and Diane Silber, American Museum of Ceramic Art(group).
- 2024 GARDEN OF CLAY, Gallery of the "Kammerhof"-Museum, Gmunden, exhibition as part of the Salzkammergut European Capital of Culture 2024.(group).
- 2025 Asymmetrisch - Maria Baumgartner, Gallery "Ceramic Art Space Vienna"(solo).
- 2026 Maria Baumgartner: Ceramics - Vladimir Koci: Paintings & Drawings, Gallery "12" for Contemporary and Applied Arts, Eggenburg (Lower Austria)(solo).

== Publications (a selection) ==
- Die Österreich-Seite: »Man muss in die Werkstatt gehen«. Über Franz Josef Altenburg (The Austria page: on Franz Josef Altenburg. In: Neue Keramik. ISSN 0933-2367, vol 3 (1989), no. 5, pp. 583–584.
- Keramikerinnen in Salzburg (Female Ceramists in Salzburg). In: Wally, Barbara (ed.): Künstlerinnen in Salzburg (Female Artists in Salzburg). ed. Museum Carolino Augusteum, Salzburg 1991, ISBN 3-901014-08-X, pp. 83–98.
- Ceramics in Austria – Survival in the Invisible. In: European Ceramic from 13 counties: exhibition catalogue, Kunsthalle Dominikanerkirche Osnabrück. ed. Rasch (Bramsche/ Germany) 1998, ISBN 3-932147-47-2, pp. 120–123.
- GARDEN OF CLAY. An exhibition of the European Capital of Culture Bad Ischl Salzkammergut 2024 within the project „City of Ceramics“ Gmunden, ed. Society for Promoting European Ceramic Artists, Gmunden 2024, ISBN 978-3-200-10043-5.
