= Erich Wonder =

Austrian scenic designer and academic teacher

- Born: 30 March 1944 (age 82); Jennersdorf, Burgenland, Austria
- Education: Kunstschule Graz; Akademie der bildenden Künste Wien
- Occupations: Scenic designer; Academic teacher
- Organizations: Universität für angewandte Kunst Wien; Akademie der bildenden Künste Wien

Erich Wonder (born 30 March 1944) is an Austrian scenic designer and academic teacher who created sets for international stages and festivals including the Bayreuth Festival.

== Life and career ==
Born in Jennersdorf, Burgenland on 30 March 1944, Wonder studied at the Kunstschule Graz from 1960 to 1964, where he attended the painting class of Otto Brunner. He studied stage design at the Akademie der bildenden Künste Wien with Lois Egg from 1965 to 1968. He first worked as an assistant stage designer at the Theater Bremen from 1968 to 1971, where Wilfried Minks was chief designer, and then at the Schauspiel Frankfurt to 1978.

Wonder then worked as freelance designer with directors including Ruth Berghaus, Luc Bondy, Matthias Hartmann, Paulus Manker, Christof Nel, Hans Neuenfels, Claus Peymann, Johannes Schaaf and Horst Zankl.

He created the stage design for the 1994 production of the Bayreuth Festival of Tristan und Isolde, directed by Heiner Müller. In 2000 he designed there the sets for the Millenium Ring of Der Ring des Nibelungen, directed by Jürgen Flimm.

Erich Wonder also participated in exhibitions and performances, such as Inszenierte Räume at the Kunstverein in Hamburg in 1978 with Karl-Ernst Herrmann, Rosebud at the Düsseldorfer Schauspielhaus in 1979 with Fritz Schediwy, and Das Auge des Taifun on the Wiener Ringstraße 1992 with Müller and the band Einstürzende Neubauten, filmed by Paulus Manker. In 1987, he presented with Heiner Goebbels the project Maelstromsüdpol at the documenta 8 in Kassel.

Wonder was professor an der Universität für angewandte Kunst Wien as leader of the masterclass for stage design from 1978. He was professor at the Akademie der bildenden Künste Wien from 1985 to 2012, where he headed the Department of Scenography at the Institute of Art and Architecture. Among his students are Ina Peichl, Christian Schmidt, and Reinhard von der Thannen.

In 2006, Wonder designed the trophy of the Faust award.
