= Gudrun Baudisch-Wittke =

Austrian ceramist

Gudrun Baudisch, later Gudrun Baudisch-Wittke (17 March 1907 – 16 October 1982) was an Austrian ceramist, sculptor, and painter. Baudisch founded the Keramik Hallstatt workshop.

== Education ==
Baudisch was born in Pöls near Judenburg. Both her father Dr. Raimund Baudisch (1876–1936) and stepmother Rudolfine Cervonik (1884–1953) were interested in art and culture. Raimund and Rudolfine both encouraged Baudisch's desire for an artistic profession. In 1922 Baudisch was admitted to the Österreichische Bundeslehranstalt für das Baufach und Kunstgewerbe in Graz and worked for a year in the sculpture class of Wilhelm Gösser. Baudisch worked several times as a trainee in the Tonindustrie Scheibbs. The "heads" created in 1924, which are characteristic of Baudisch, were probably inspired by colleagues (Vally Wieselthier, Rudolf Knörlein) at the Scheibbs factory. From 1923 onwards, she followed a three-year apprenticeship in the ceramics class of Hans Adametz, and in 1926 she received her diploma from the Graz institute.

== Early work ==
In 1926 Baudisch began her professional activity as a volunteer in the design department of the Wiener Werkstätte. By the end of the year, she had created her first models for serial ceramics. Baudisch designed and executed 166 objects for the Wiener Werkstätte. Well-known is the "Woman's Head with Bowl" from 1926, which was to find many sequels. In 1928, together with Vally Wieselthier, she designed the cover of the celebratory catalogue for the 25th anniversary of the Wiener Werkstätte. From 1926 to 1930 she worked there as a designer and exerted great influence with her almost expressive ornamentation, playful heads and the best craftsmanship. However, financial hardship and the coming world economic crisis prevented an upswing in the ceramics department.

In 1930 she was able to take part in the Österreichischer Werkbund exhibition in Vienna with two life-size sculptures. In the same year she left the Wiener Werkstätte at her own request and founded her own ceramics workshop with Mario von Pontoni. This existed from 1930 to 1936.

In 1931 she married the engineer Leopold Teltscher.

So-called architectural works and stucco decorations in public buildings and in several churches began. As an assistant to the architect Clemens Holzmeister, she took over the architectural work on Kemal Atatürk's presidential palace in Ankara. Her work includes the decoration of the colonnaded courtyard on the ground floor of the palace with five fully sculptured female figures made of terracotta, whose design can be traced back to the influence of Josef Thorak and Anton Hanak. In other buildings by Clemens Holzmeister, Baudisch took over the decoration with stucco ceilings and other parts of the interior, such as in the Pfarrkirche Bregenz-Mariahilf in Bregenz (1930–1932) and in the Christus-Kirche in Vienna (1933), which was intended as a memorial church for the late Federal Chancellor Ignaz Seipel. Clemens Holzmeister then went to Turkey and Greece for professional reasons, so that it was not until 1956 that he and Baudisch worked together again.

For the "General German Catholic Day" in Vienna in 1933, Baudisch made various Christian emblems, two processional flags, a church bell and a baptismal font. In 1935, she designed the new Austrian 1-schilling coin. In 1934 she received the 1st prize of the Austrian Ministry of Finance for the 50 groschen and the 1 schilling design. She also worked on the Austrian pavilion for the Brussels International Exposition (1935). In the same year she became a full member of the Artists' Association of Austrian Sculptors. As times were bad economically, Baudisch also withdrew to the countryside in the summer to the Zinkenbacher Malerkolonie. She divorced Leopold Teltscher in 1936.

== Activity in Germany during the Nazi era ==
In 1936, Baudisch moved to Berlin. The name of Josef Thorak, who had already established himself as an artist in the Third Reich and whom Baudisch had already met in Ankara, reappeared. In Germany, the "Kunst-am-Bau-Verordnung" (Art in Construction Ordinance) had provided good working conditions for artists since 1934, even if the so-called "renewal of art" sought by the National Socialist regime was not to everyone's liking.

In the course of her work for the Nazi regime, she met the officer Karl Heinz Wittke (1908–1978) in 1938. He supervised the artist in her work at the Hermann Goering Barracks. Her second marriage to him followed on 17 December 1940. Her husband later turned out to be a competent businessman who also enabled her to pursue a largely unrestricted artistic career. From the first larger fee, Baudisch acquired a house in Hallstatt, (Hallstatt No. 16, "Zoblisches Wohnhaus") in 1937, which had to be sold by the Jewish family of Alfred Eichmanns in the course of aryanisation.

Baudisch carried out building decoration work (stucco ceilings and walls, fireplace design) in the Hakenburg castle, which was used as a private residence by Reichspostminister Ohnesorge. She also furnished the Italian Consulate General and the Spanish Embassy on behalf of the Reichsbaudirektion. However, her work was not limited to Berlin; she also received commissions for Schwerin, Posen, Hamburg and Nuremberg, and the so-called Tannenberg Memorial in East Prussia was furnished by her with a terracotta wall bearing emblems of the Luftwaffe.

== Activity in Austria in the post-war period ==
In 1944, Baudisch moved with her husband to Hallstatt. In 1945/46 Baudisch founded the Keramik Hallstatt workshop, initially also called "Hallstatt-Keramik" or "Hallstätter Keramik", which she also ran until 1977 (handover to Erwin Gschwandtner, now owned by his sons). Originals and series were created in their art pottery. At the same time, Baudisch supplied designs for moulds and decorations to Gmundner Keramik. On 30 June 1947 she passed the master's examination for the pottery trade; she had already received her trade licence for the pottery trade before that, namely on 30 April 1947. The works are more geared towards commercial (utility ceramics, tiled stoves) rather than artistic success of the products. One exception is a famous mocha service, whose Scandinavian-looking design Baudisch developed together with the Russian-born architect Anna-Lülja Praun (1906–2004) had developed.

They were also able to get Wolfgang von Wersin, who lived in neighbouring Bad Goisern, to develop tableware. In 1952, they joined the Künstlergruppe MAERZ; they were advocates of the Werkbund idea and when Wersin stood down at the general assembly of the Upper Austrian Werkbund, she was elected his successor.

The stucco ceiling for the health resort in Bad Gastein was created as a larger work in 1948. A stucco ceiling planned between 1951 and 1954 for the destroyed Gold Cabinet in Belvedere Palace was not executed. In 1954, she received a commission for the stucco decoration of the ceiling in the auditorium of the Vienna Burgtheater; for health reasons, however, she had to hand over the commission to Hilda Schmid-Jesser.

From 1959 to 1966, she created, again in collaboration with Clemens Holzmeister, the ceramic room decoration of the Großes Festspielhaus in Salzburg. In 1980 she created the sculpture "Porcelain Tree" for the ORF studio in Salzburg. She had already varied the tree motif in other works (for example Lebensbaum at the Holzleiten estate in Rüstdorf).

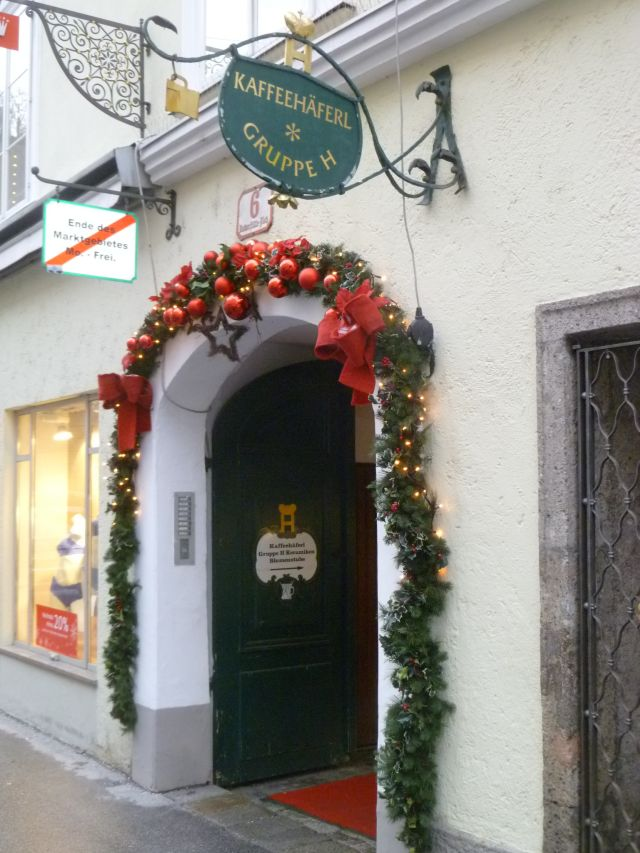
Company sign of Gruppe H on Salzburg's Universitätsplatz

In 1968, together with Johannes Hohenberg, who had taken over Gmundner Keramik in 1968, she founded the "Gruppe H" (H stands for Hallstatt and Hohenberg) work group. In 1969, the sales premises of "Gruppe H" were founded in Salzburg (in a through house at Universitätsplatz 6). The company sign can still be found on the house for nostalgic reasons, although the business had already ceased in 1982.

In 1974, she moved to Salzburg. Here she lived with her husband in a small flat in the old town on Universitätsplatz until her death; in addition, she had set up a studio in the district of Riedenburg, where she could continue to pursue her clay work.

== Works ==
=== Coins ===
- 1934/35 Value side of the 50-groschen and 1-schilling coin

=== Ceramic building works ===
- Bad Goisern
  - spa hotel, 1951/52.
  - Volksbank: Baukeramik, 1973.
  - Electrode factory Steeg: wall decoration on the office building, 1962.
- Bad Ischl
  - central school: entrance design, 1962.
  - Hotel Goldener Stern, 1962/72.
  - Upper Austria People's Credit Bank: Relief, 1962.
  - Kurhaus, 1966.
  - Kurmittelhaus, 1967.
- Bad Schallerbach, bath house, 1975.
- Gloggnitz, Christ the King's Church: Marien-Kap., 1965.
- Grein, nursing home: Institution-Kap .; Tabernacle, 1973.
- Hallstatt
  - Hotel Grüner Baum: Mosaik et al., 1952, 1977.
  - Music rehearsal room in Lahn: wall decoration, 1958.
  - Elementary school, 1965.
- Leogang, Hotel Krallerhof: wall decoration of the cellar bar, 1973.
- Linz
  - Urban retirement home: mosaic, 1962.
  - Bruckner Conservatory: Frieze in the Great Hall, 1970.
  - Chamber of Agriculture: Lecture Hall, 1973/74. State Theater, 1957 (also stucco work).
  - Landeskulturzentrum Ursulinenhof: ballroom wall design, 1975/76.
  - Restaurant, 1978.
- Mayrhofen / Tyrol, Catholic parish: Tabernacle cladding; Baptism chap., 1968/69.
- Obertraun
  - Berghotel Krippenstein, 1950/56.
  - Federal Sports School, 1951–53 (also stucco ceiling and stove).
- Rechnitz / Burgenland, sisters from Göttl. Redeemer: tabernacle, cape altar cross, 1975.
- Rustorf / Upper Austria, elementary school: facade mosaic, 1971.
- Salzburg
  - Festspielhaus, 1959/60 (also mortar-cut ceiling in the presidential room).
  - Hotel Gablerbräu, 1953 (together with Carl Jamöck); 12 medallions.
  - Hotel Austria Hof, 1961/62.
- Strobl / Salzburg, Volksbildungsheim: Mosaik, 1969.
- Weyregg, Housekeeping School, 1976.
- Vienna
  - Wiener Ver., Administration building (Vienna III): Mosaik, 1963.
  - Central cemetery, crematorium: various mosaics, 1967/69, 1970/72, 1976/77.
  - Cemetery SW (Vienna XII): Relief, 1974/75.
  - Economic Development Inst. (Vienna XVIII): Wall sculpture, purchased in 1972.
- Wörgl / Tirol, Urn Cemetery: Plastic, 1965.
- Zell Am See, gliding school, Fliegerheim: mural, 1958.
- Zwölfaxing / Lower Austria, Catholic Parish: Tabernakel, 1966/67.

=== Stucco ===
- Ankara, Gazi Ewi, Palace Kemal Atatürk, 1930.
- Badgastein, Kurheim, 1948.
- Bad Goisern, spa hotel, 1951/52.
- Berlin (together with C. Jamöck)
  - K.-Schumacher-Damm, Quartier Napoleon: ballroom ceiling; Terracotta fireplace, 1937/38.
  - Italian Consulate (Graf-Spee-Str. 17), 1938/41.
  - Spanish Consulate (Lichtensteinallee 30): Ballroom ceiling, 1938/43.
  - Reichsmünze (Moltke market): 1936/42.
- Bregenz, Mariahilf Church: ceiling also stone and ceramic work; Virgin Mary statue above the high altar, 1931.
- Frohnleiten / Styria, Pfannberg Castle, 1959/60.
- Fuschl / Salzburg, Hotel Schloss Fuschl, 1959.
- Gmunden, Stadttheater: Saaldecke, 1949 (together with C. Jamöck).
- Rustorf / Upper Austria, Gut Holzleithen, 1952
- Salzburg, Chamber for Workers and Employees: Blanket, 1950 (together with C. Jamöck).
- Vienna
  - Konfektionshaus Neumann (Vienna I): ceiling in the ladies' salon, 1949/50 (together with C. Jamöck).
  - Villa Mautner-Markhof (Vienna XI): ceiling in the music room, 1949 (together with C. Jamöck).
  - Vienna (XV), Christ the King Memorial Church, 1934 (together with C. Jamöck).

=== Other architecture and monument art ===
- Altenmarkt / Pongau: tabernacle. Brussels, World Exhibition, Austria Pavilion: Tree of Life, mortar cut, 1935.
- Hallstatt
  - Urnenhain: Monument, 1962 (design E. Boltenstern).
  - Road tunnel, S-portal: state coat of arms, bronze relief, 1966.
  - Salzberg burial ground: fountain, 1956 (design C. Holzmeister).
- Leoben, Creditanstalt, Kassenhalle: plaster mortar cut, 1951/52.
- Linz
  - Schlosszwinger playground: drinking fountain with mosaic, 1956/57.
  - Südbahnhof: Fischbrunnen, 1952.
  - Dr. E. Koref School: Fischbrunnen, 1959.
- Mauthausen, Bezirksaltenheim: interior design of the chapel, 1964.
- Riyadh / Saudi Arabia, Council of Ministers Majlis Al Shura: wall decoration, furnishings, design, 1975.

== Awards ==
- 1934: 1st prize in the coin competition of the Austrian Ministry of Finance for the 50-groschen and 1-schilling design
- 1961: Berufstitel Professor (title of professor)
- 1962: Bayerischer Staatspreis der Handwerkskammer München
- 1964: Silver medal at the international ceramics exhibition in Prague
- 1965: XXIII. Concorso internationale della Ceramica d’Arte contemporanea, Gold medal, Faenza, Italy
- 1971: Honorary citizen of Hallstatt
