= Andreas Kronthaler (fashion designer) =

Austrian creative director and fashion designer

Andreas Kronthaler (born 1966) is an Austrian fashion designer and the current creative director of the fashion house Vivienne Westwood. He is the widower of fashion designer Vivienne Westwood.

== Early life ==
Kronthaler was born in Tyrol, Austria.

In 1980, he went to Ortwein art school in Graz, Austria, where he spent five years training to be a jeweler. During this time, he began to experiment with fashion, making clothes at home to be sold to friends and in local stores.

He studied Industrial Design at the University of Applied Arts Vienna and switched to fashion design.

== Career ==
In 1988, Kronthaler met Vivienne Westwood while she was teaching fashion design at the Vienna School of Applied Art. Westwood was nearly 25 years Kronthaler’s senior. In 1989, he moved to London to work for her firm. Their first joint collection was the Spring–Summer 1991 collection: Cut and Slash. In this collection, Kronthaler presented Renaissance-inspired gowns – later named the Sun Wheel dress.

Kronthaler and Westwood married in 1992. They continued to develop collections together. They were married until Westwood's death on 29 December 2022.

For the wedding of the imprisoned journalist and founder of WikiLeaks Julian Assange to Stella Morris in March 2022 in Belmarsh Prison, the groom wore an outfit based on a Scottish kilt and the bride a dress with a graffiti application, both designs by Kronthaler and his wife, Vivienne Westwood.

=== Andreas Kronthaler for Vivienne Westwood ===
While Kronthaler initially was a silent design partner and creative director, in 2016 Westwood acknowledged his commitment and influence on the Gold Label collection over 25 years by renaming the line Andreas Kronthaler for Vivienne Westwood.
