= Baudisch =

Baudisch is a surname. Notable people with the surname include:

- Gudrun Baudisch-Wittke (1907–1982), Austrian woman ceramist, sculptor, and painter
- Oskar Baudisch (1881–1950), Austrian American biochemist and radiographer
- Patrick Baudisch, German computer scientist
