= The Distant Land =

1987 film

- Directed by: Luc Bondy
- Written by: Arthur Schnitzler (play); Meir Dohnal; Luc Bondy
- Starring: Michel Piccoli; Bulle Ogier
- Cinematography: Thomas Mauch
- Release date: 13 August 1987
- Running time: 103 minutes
- Countries: Austria; West Germany; France
- Language: German

The Distant Land (German: Das weite Land) is a 1987 Austrian-German drama film that was adapted from the play by Arthur Schnitzler and directed by Luc Bondy. It was screened in the Un Certain Regard section at the 1987 Cannes Film Festival. The film was selected as the Austrian entry for the Best Foreign Language Film at the 61st Academy Awards, but was not accepted as a nominee.

== Plot ==
A promising young pianist commits suicide. He spent his last evening in the company of the industrialist Friedrich Hofreiter. His wife Genia is in possession of a farewell note.

== Cast ==
- Michel Piccoli – Friedrich Hofreiter
- Bulle Ogier – Génia
- Wolfgang Hübsch – Mauer
- Barbara Rebeschini – Erna
- Milena Vukotic – Madame Wahl
- Dominique Blanc – Adèle Natter
- Jutta Lampe – Madame Meinhold
- Alain Cuny – Aigner – le père d'Otto
- Gabriel Barylli – Otto
- Friedrich Hammel – Stanzides
- Jeff Layton – Paul
- Paulus Manker – Korsakov
- Dorothea Parton – La nurse
- Paul Burian – Monsieur Natter
- Luís Miguel Cintra

== See also ==
- List of submissions to the 61st Academy Awards for Best Foreign Language Film
- List of Austrian submissions for the Academy Award for Best Foreign Language Film
