= Maria Biljan-Bilger =

Austrian ceramist, sculptor and textile artist

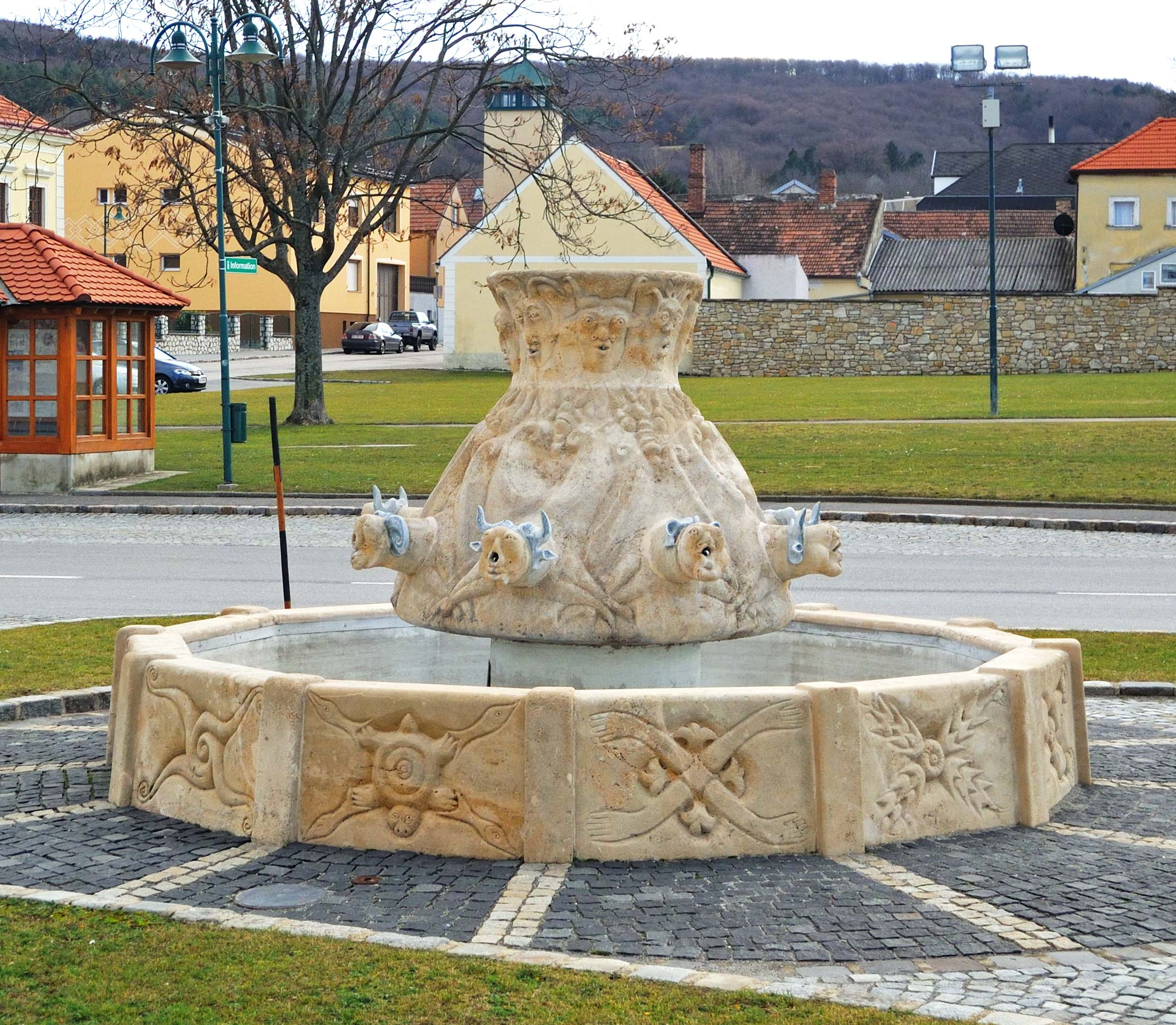
Fountain in Sommerein sculpted by Maria Biljan-Bilger

Maria Biljan-Bilger (1912–1997) was an Austrian ceramist, sculptor and textile artist. A prominent female artist in the male-dominated post-war period, she is remembered as a co-founder of the Vienna Art Club in 1947 and as a professor of ceramics at the University of Applied Arts Vienna (1978–92). In the 1950s, she was successful in receiving a number of commissions from the city of Vienna for art works and memorials in public spaces. Inspired by the folk culture of southern and eastern Europe, her works were exhibited at the Venice and São Paulo biennials.

== Early life, education and family ==
Born on 21 January 1912 in Radstadt, Maria Biljan-Bilger was raised in Graz where her father Daniel Biljan (1872–1942) was a master over maker. From 1927 to 1931 she attended the Arts and Crafts School (Kunstgewerbeschule) in Graz where she studied ceramics under Hans Adametz. In 1933 she married the chemist Ferdinand Bilger, the cousin of her fellow ceramics student Goldy Parin-Matthèy. They had no children and the marriage was dissolved in 1947.

== Career ==
After the German annexation of Austria, she moved to Vienna where she created colorfully decorated sandstone works in her workshop and took up employment with the ceramics firm B. Erndt in Pöchlarn, Lower Austria.

In 1947, in a male-dominated community she stood out as a co-founder of the Austrian Art Club. As a result, she was able to present her works in several international exhibitions. In the 1950s, she was successful in receiving a number of commissions from the city of Vienna for art works and memorials in public spaces. Inspired by the folk culture of southern and eastern Europe, her works were exhibited at the Venice and São Paulo biennials. From 1961, in collaboration with Karl Prantl, she helped to arrange the International Sculpture Symposium at Sankt Margarethen im Burgenland, taking over its management from 1970 to 1987. During this period, she worked on her large stone sculptures.

In 1978, Biljan.Bilger was appointed professor of ceramics at the Faculty of Applied Arts in Vienna, where she served until her retirement in 1982.

Maria Biljan-Bilger died in Munich, Germany, on 1 May 1997.
