= Am Schöpfwerk Church =

Church in Meidling, Austria

Coordinates: 48°09′33″N 16°19′45″E

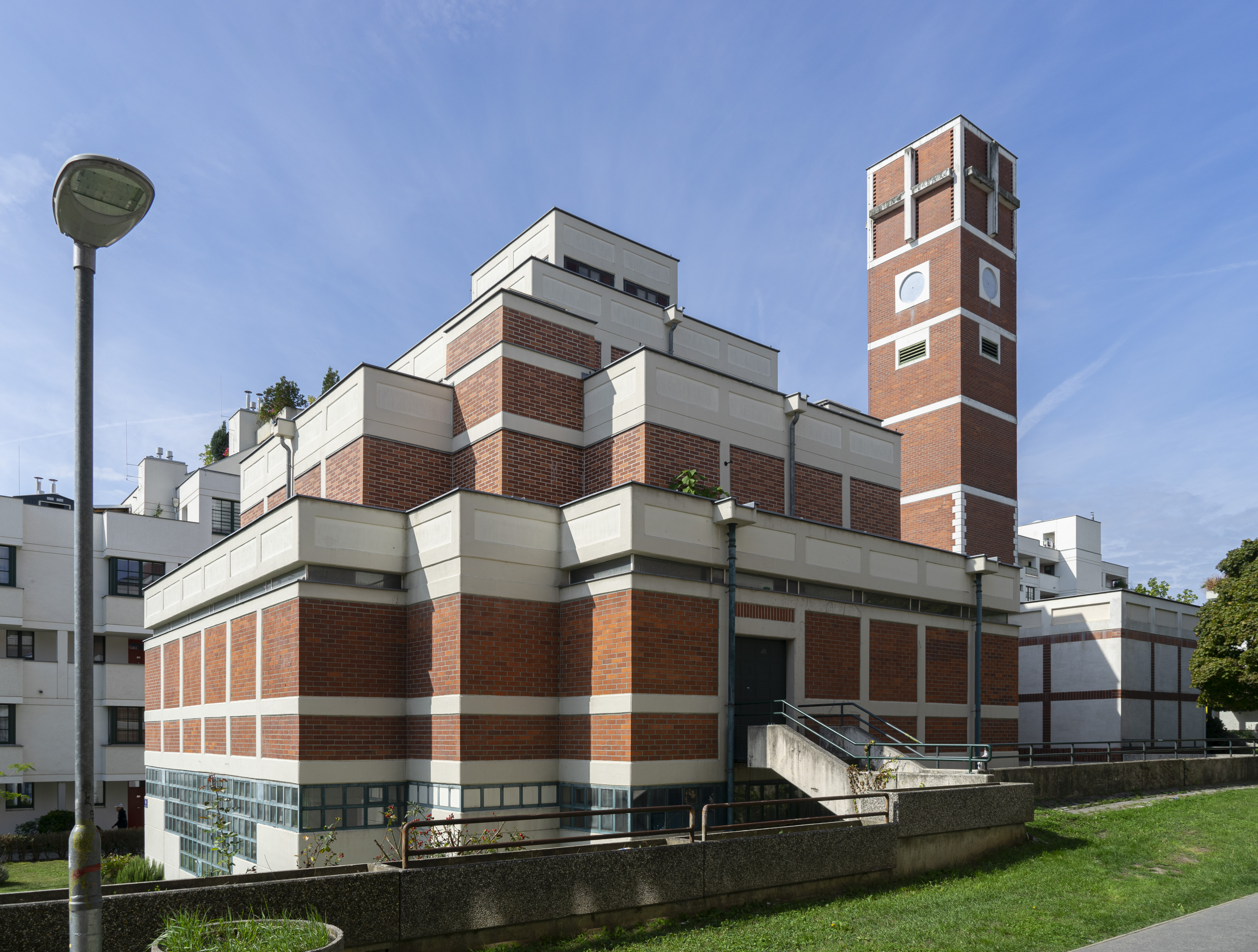
Am Schöpfwerk Church

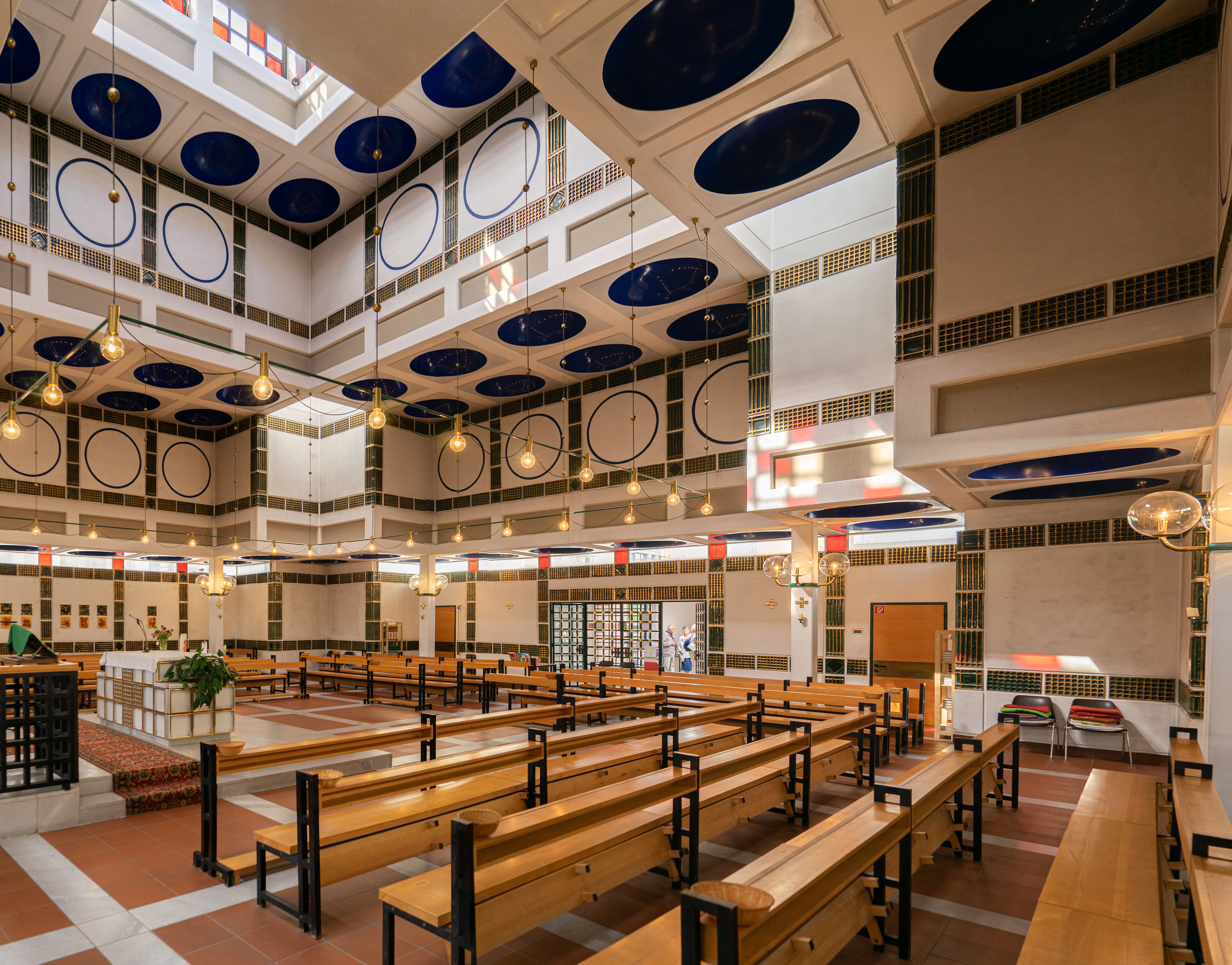
Interior

The Church of the Akathist of the Most Holy Mother of God (German: Kirche Am Schöpfwerk) is an Eastern Orthodox parish church, dedicated to the Akathist to the Most Holy Theotokos, and is the most recently built church in Meidling, the 12th district of Vienna, Austria.

The church belongs to the Deanery of Eastern Austria, the Eparchy of Austria-Switzerland of the Serbian Orthodox Church. The church is dedicated to the Akathist faith in honor of the Blessed Virgin Mary.

== Description ==
The church is situated on the edge of the large-scale Viennese city housing development Am Schöpfwerk, which was constructed 1976–80 on the south slope of the Wienerberg in Altmannsdorf, part of the district of Meidling (Lichtensterngasse 4). The architect of the housing development, Viktor Hufnagl, also designed the church, which was built 1979–81. The Am Schöpfwerk parish was established in 1982.

Because of the nature of the terrain the church is built on two levels: the lower storey accommodates the parish rooms and offices, while the church itself is located in the upper one. The building is composed of cubic elements piled up symmetrically in the form of a stepped pyramid. The load-bearing elements are plastered, and consist of a reinforced concrete skeleton filled in with exposed brickwork. A seven-storey bell tower stands next to the low entrance hall.

A stairway leads from the rooms on the ground floor to a central vestibule through which the church proper is accessible. This consists of a central space, with room for 220 people seated and 400 standing, in the shape of a Greek cross surrounded by an ambulatory delineated by concrete pillars. The cubic elements, which draw together in this space, terminate at the apex of the pyramid in a lantern of glass windows. The white interior, highlighted by green and golden ceramic tiles, is strongly reminiscent of the Jugendstil.

The main fitting is the central altar, of ceramic, raised up on two steps. Behind it is a 19th-century crucifix. There is also a Pietà painted by Carry Hauser. Michael Fuchs, son of the painter Ernst Fuchs, painted the picture of Saint Francis of Assisi. The ceramic Way of the Cross and holy water stoup are by Franz Josef Altenburg, the remaining decorations by Traude Windbrechtinger.

In 2022, the church was transferred from the Roman Catholic Church to the Serbian Orthodox Church for use. This was justified by the fact that at the time of its founding in 1982, around 5,000 Catholics lived at the pumping station, but this number had decreased to just under 1,000 due to demographic changes. At the same time, the proportion of residents of Orthodox faith increased. The Roman Catholic parish associated with the church was merged with the parish of Altmannsdorf, to whose territory the settlements at the pumping station had already belonged before the parish's founding. [ 1 ] This did not entail any change of ownership in the land register. [ 2 ] The building is a listed monument ( listed entry ).

== Sources ==
- Felix Czeike: Historisches Lexikon Wien Bd. 1. Kremayr & Scheriau, Vienna 1992
- Dehio-Handbuch Wien. X. bis XIX. und XXI. bis XXIII. Bezirk. Verlag Anton Schroll, Vienna 1996
