= Sanatorium Purkersdorf =

Former hospital in Austria

- Sanatorium Purkersdorf (in German)
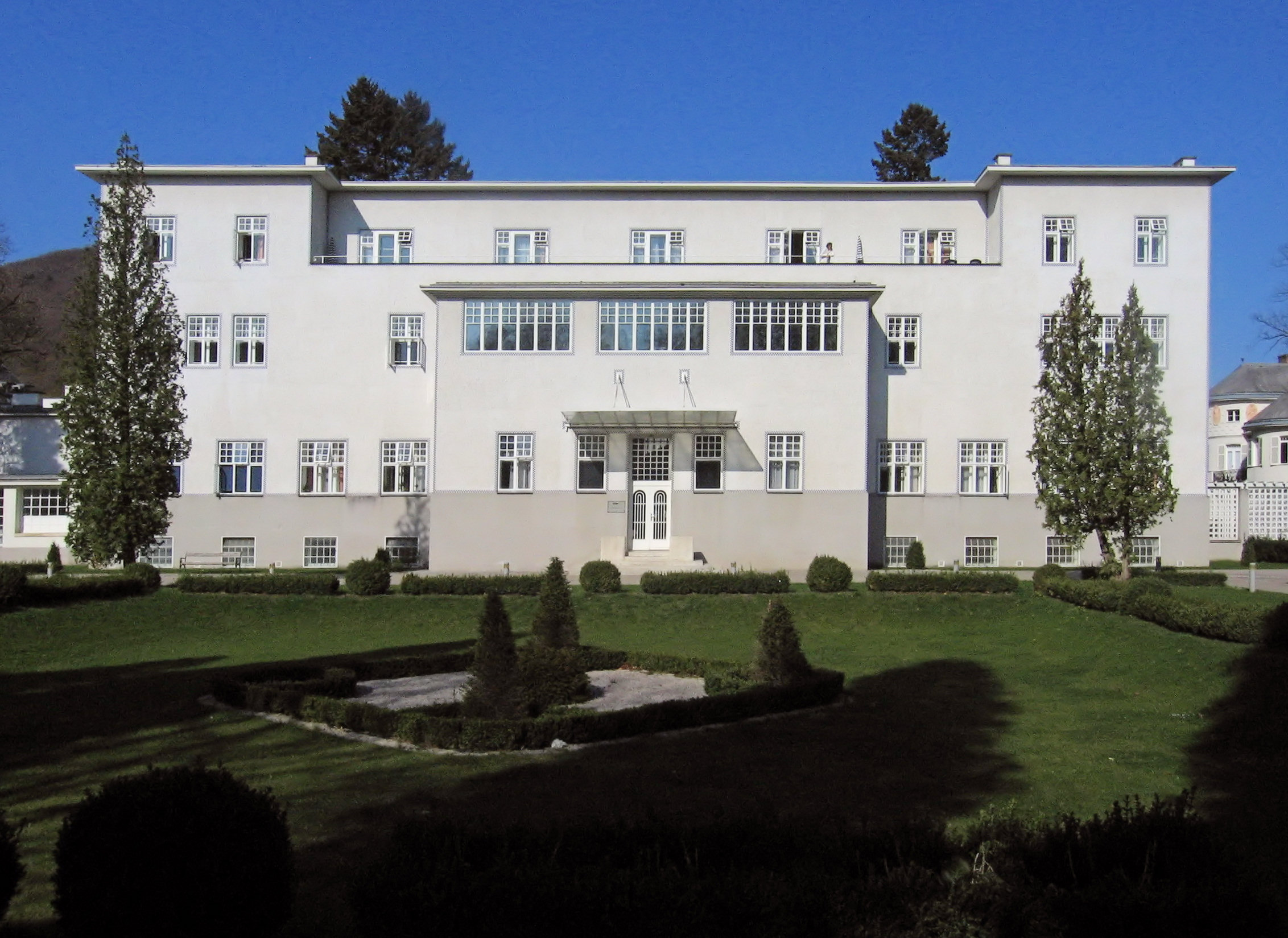
- Front view of the Sanatorium Purkersdorf
- Interactive map of the Sanatorium Purkersdorf area

General information
- Architectural style: Jugendstil
- Location: Purkersdorf, Austria
- Coordinates: 48°12′14.4″N 16°11′47.40″E
- Construction started: 1904
- Completed: 1905

Design and construction
- Architect: Josef Hoffmann
- Other designers: Wiener Werkstaette

The Sanatorium Purkersdorf was built as a sanatorium in Purkersdorf, Wien-Umgebung, Lower Austria. It was built in 1904-05 by the architect Josef Hoffmann for the industrialist Victor Zuckerkandl and is an example of the style of the Viennese Secession in architecture.

== Sanatorium ==
Zuckerkandl, the general director of the Silesian Iron Work of Gliwice, purchased the property at the city border of Vienna in 1903. It was acquired as a "mineral spa together with cure-park." Since the 19th Century a mineral spring bubbled on the property. The original furnishings were made by the Wiener Werkstätte with which the architect Hoffmann was involved. The ownership and management of the sanatorium were lost in the course of the Aryanization of 1938.

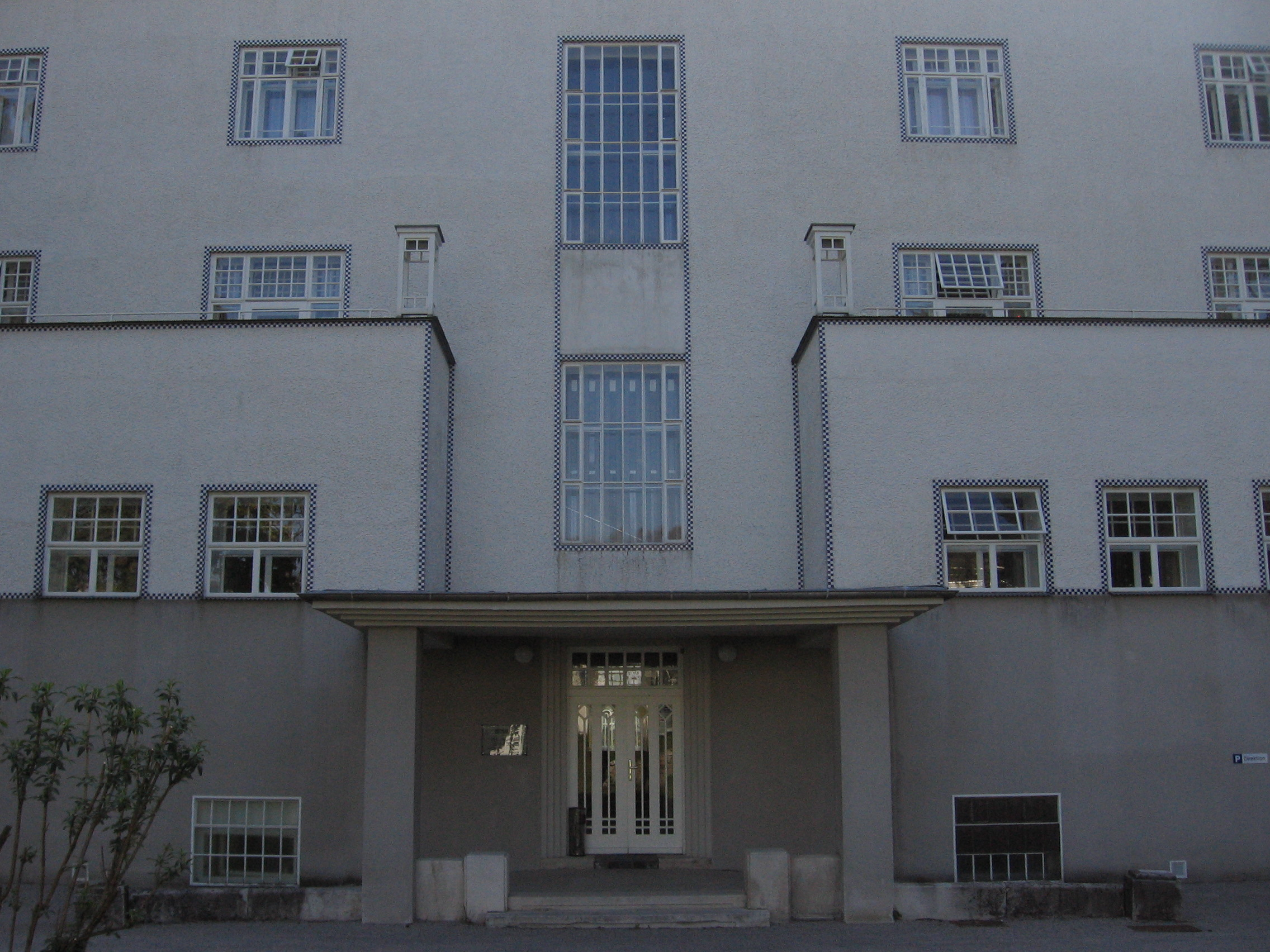
The western entrance into the building.

The sanitorium was more of a hotel than hospital and turned into a social and artistic venue of Viennese society. Among the treatments were mineral baths, physical therapies, therapeutic massages and physiotherapy. Convalescence cases and mental illnesses were especially treated in the upper classes. Through silence, light and air, and the rationality of the facility with ornament reduced to a minimum, cures of the new illnesses such as nervousness, and hysteria were sought. Also provided were reading rooms, a playroom for card games, table tennis, billiard and music-rooms for the entertainment of the guests.

In 1926, against the will of Josef Hoffmann, the architect Leopold Bauer heightened the building with another floor, which impaired the original artistic conception.

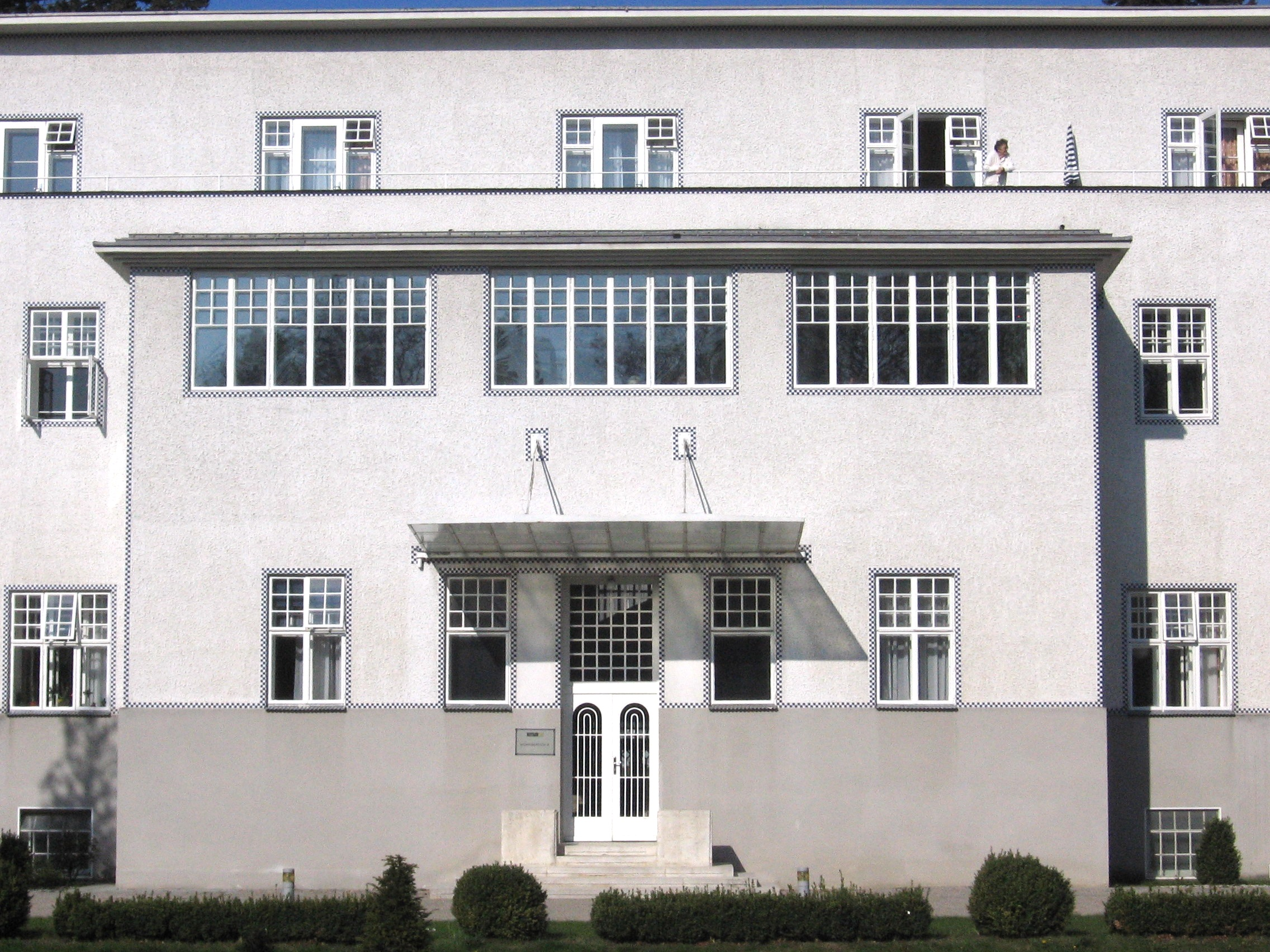
Garden side entrance.

After the death of Victor Zuckerkandls in 1927 the sanitarium was inherited by his nephews and nieces. From 1930, a son-in-law continued the business with little success. Trude Zuckerkandl tried in 1938 to restore the ailing business. Before an economic recuperation, Austria's Anschluss took place and in March 1938 was the Aryanization. Towards the end of World War II, the building served as a military hospital. In 1945, it was requisitioned by the Russian occupying forces.

== Hospital ==
The Protestant church acquired the building in 1952 and rebuilt it as a hospital. A part of the facility was used as a nursing home. The old pavilions had to be rebuilt because of dilapidation. The business was discontinued in 1975. The buildings and park remained long unused and fell into disrepair.

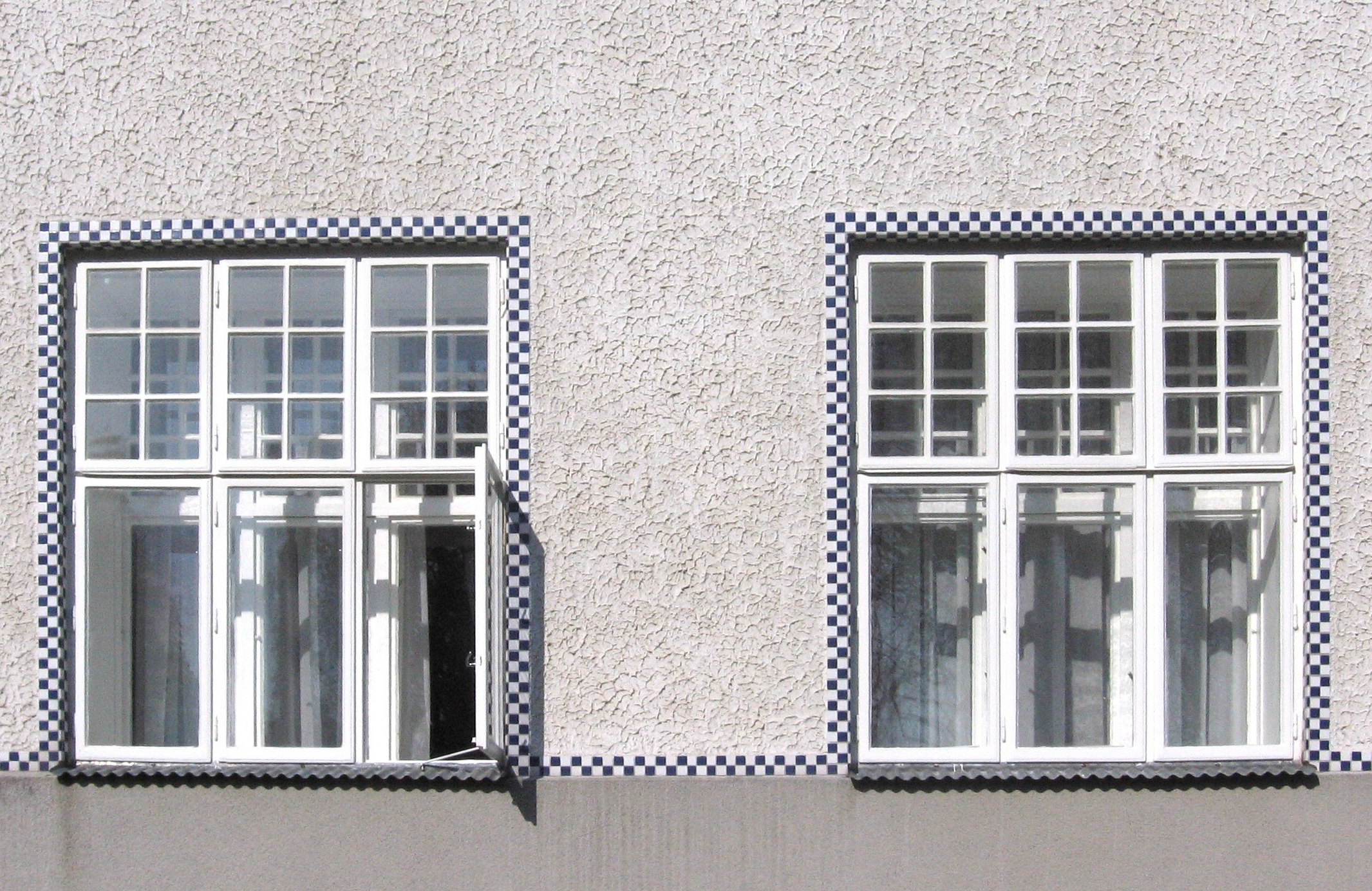
View of the windows with tile detailing.

== Restoration ==
In 1995, an external renovation took place, whereby the upper floor added by Leopold Bauer was removed and the original appearance was restored. On the inside cultural festivities took place and in the years 1996 to 2001 Paulus Manker's "Alma – A Show biz ans Ende" about the life of the Alma Mahler-Werfel was filmed there. The necessary interior renovation was finally carried out in 2003 and it is now used as a senior care home.
