= Slumming (film) =

- Directed by: Michael Glawogger
- Starring: Paulus Manker; August Diehl
- Release date: 10 February 2006 (BIFF)
- Running time: 100 min
- Countries: Austria; Switzerland
- Language: German

Slumming is a 2006 Austrian-Swiss comedy film directed by Michael Glawogger.

== Cast ==
- Paulus Manker - Franz Kallmann
- August Diehl - Sebastian
- Michael Ostrowski - Alex
- Pia Hierzegger - Pia
- Maria Bill - Herta
