= Schlosskapelle Mitterberg =

Austrian chapel

Coordinates: 48.054296°N 13.811690°E

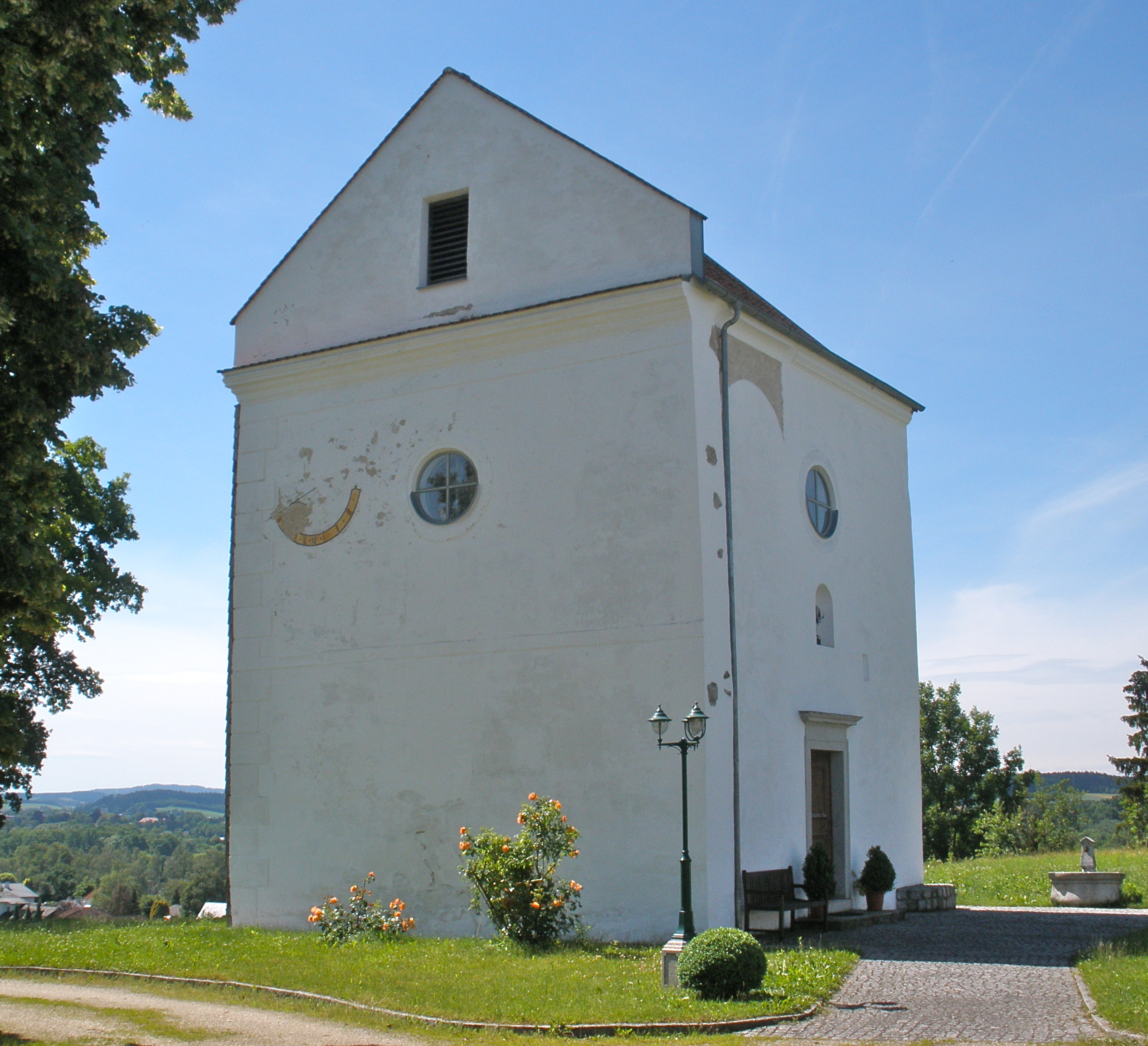
Schlosskapelle Mitterberg

The Schlosskapelle Mitterberg is a 1650 built Chapel in the municipality of Rüstorf in Upper Austria. It was once part of the Mitterberg castle. It was restored from 1997 to 2003 and used as an Ecumenist chapel of the Holy Trinity. The chapel is under Deutsche Stiftung Denkmalschutz.

== History ==
The Mitterberg castle was first mentioned in documents in 1185 in the Admont Abbey. In 1653, the castle was completely rebuilt.

In 1990, the worthiness of preservation of the dilapidated chapel was confirmed by the Provincial Monuments Office, and in 1997 ownership was transferred to the newly founded "Verein zur Rettung der Schlosskapelle Mitterberg" (Association for the Rescue of Mitterberg Castle Chapel), which had the restoration carried out with the help of public funds and donations by 2003. On 31 August 2003, Bishop Maximilian Aichern and Superintendent Hansjörg Eichmeyer consecrated the chapel.

== Art historical significance ==
=== Stucco work ===
The restoration was very close to the original design. The stuccowork shows connections to the Lambach Abbey and is outstanding in the Schwanenstadt region in Baroque buildings.

=== Interior of the chapel ===
The retable depicts the Holy Trinity in the form of a stigmatas.

Next to the altarpiece are two main sculptures representing the Saints Francis of Assisi and Dominic. In niches of the chapel are four figures depicting Mary as Queen of Heaven, and the saints Joseph, Nicolas and Florian.

=== Façade ===
A ceramic cross by the sculptor Franz Josef Altenburg has been attached to the north-west side of the chapel since 19 June 2011.

== Use ==
The heated chapel with up to 50 seats is used for public and private events, and for baptismss, devotions and exhibitions.

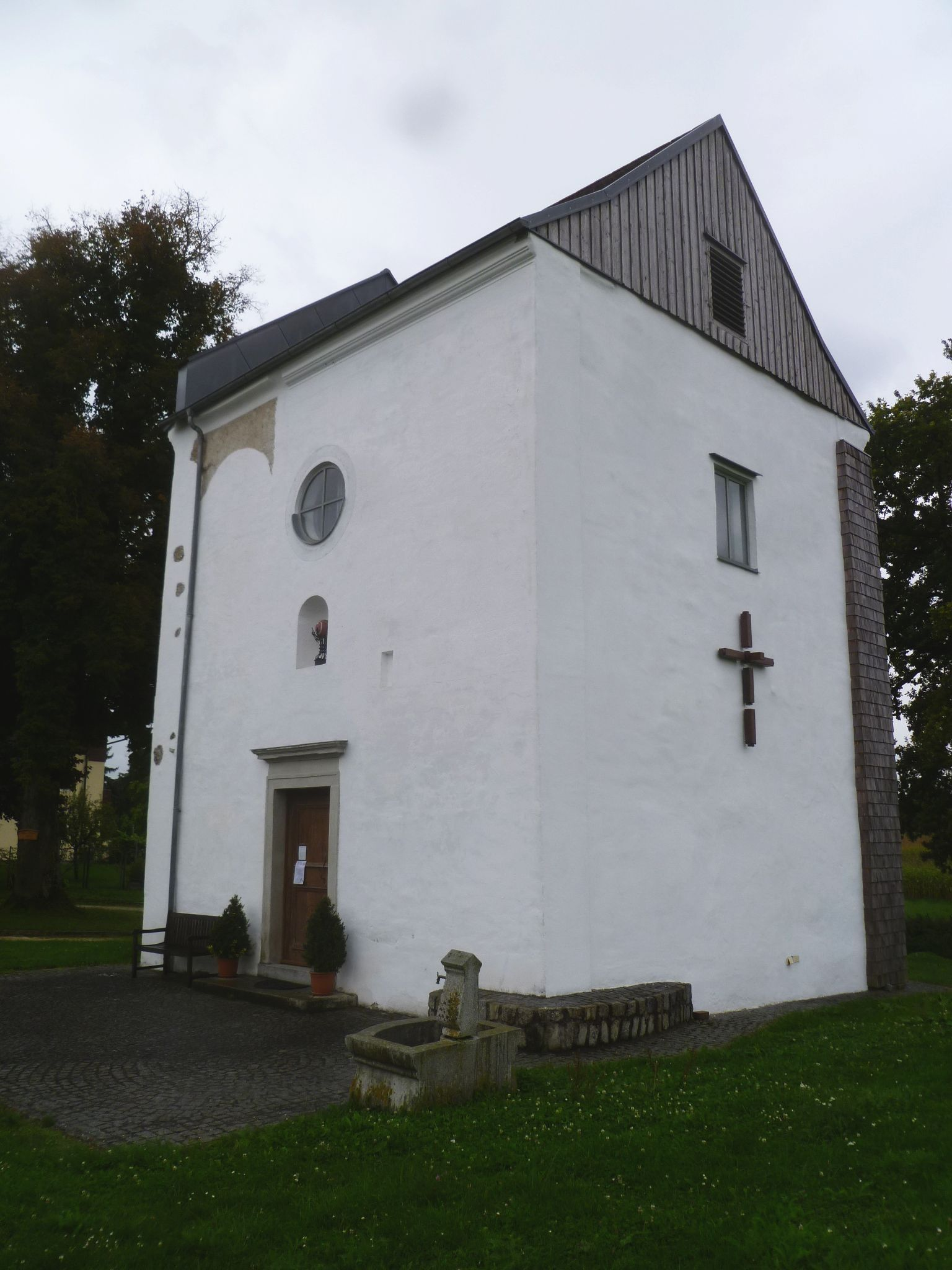
Mitterberg castle

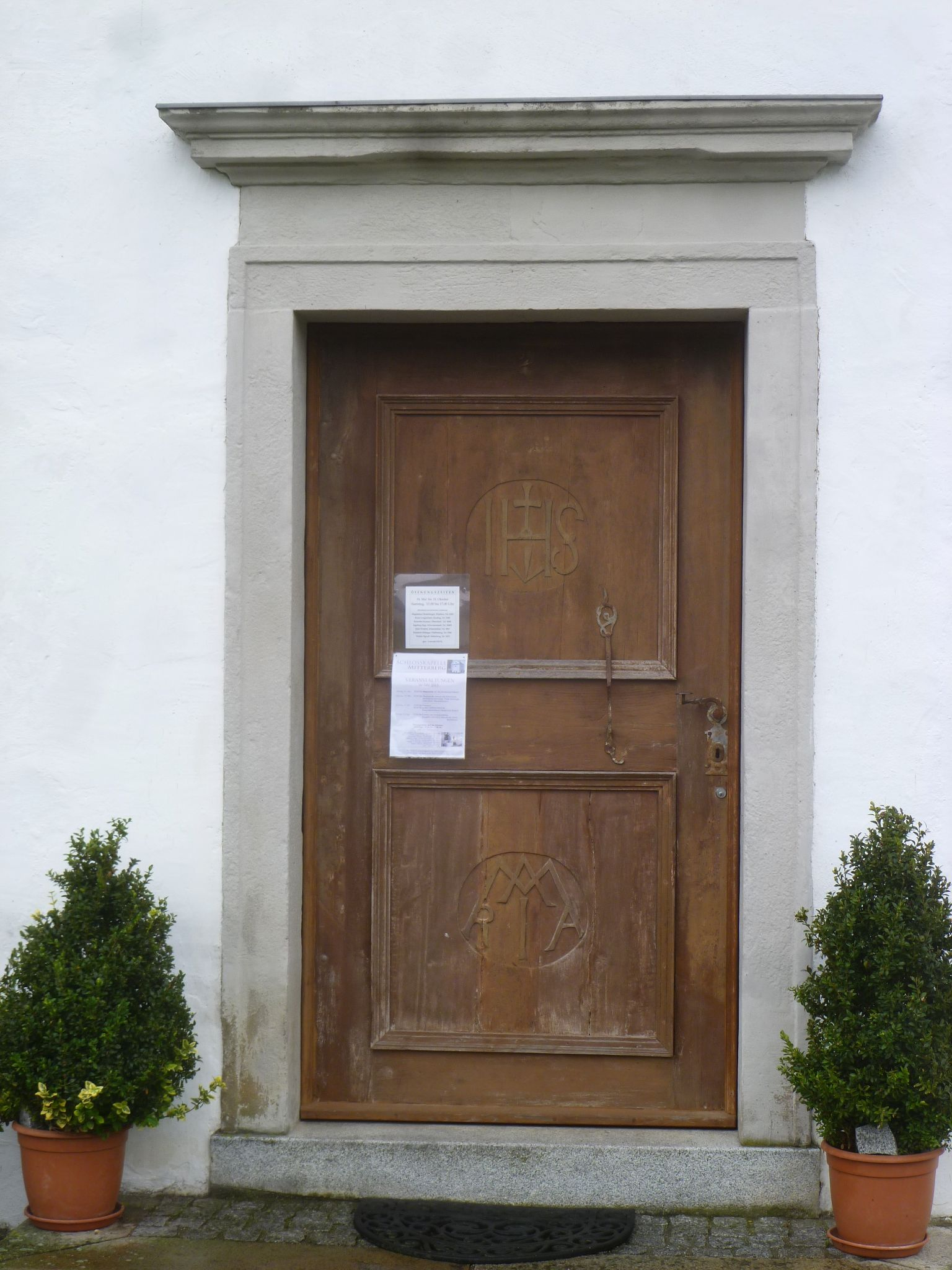
Entrance to Mitterberg castle

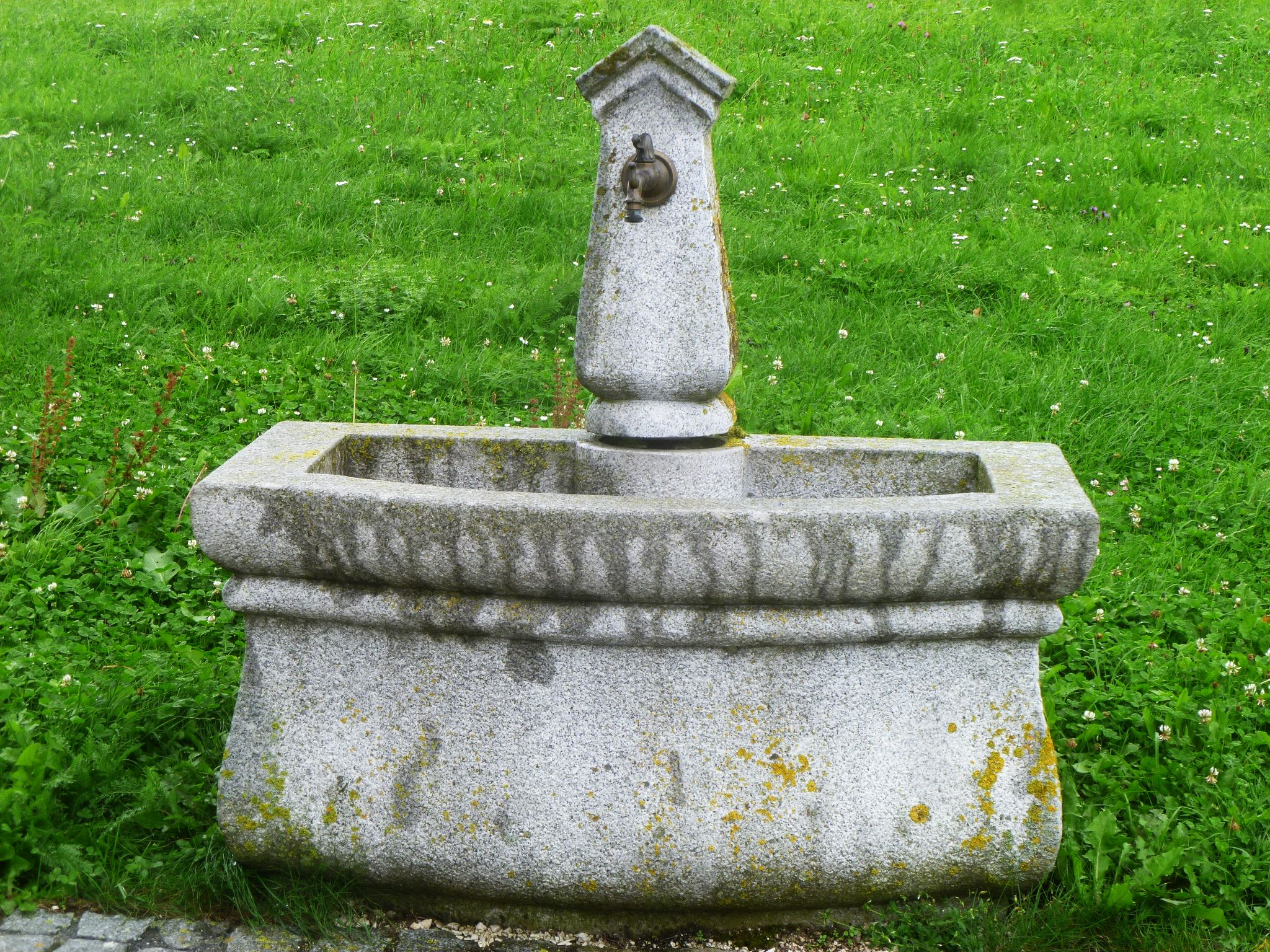
Well at the Mitterberg castle
