= Salzburg Award for Ceramic Art =

The Salzburg Award for Ceramic Art ("Salzburger Keramikpreis") is a combination of two Austrian arts awards devoted exclusively to ceramic art.

== History, Organisation ==
These Salzburg Ceramics Awards are organized by the department of culture of the state of Salzburg in Austria. Starting 1989 as regional award, it is put out for tender worldwide since 1993, and has become one of the most prestigious awards in the field of ceramic art in the German speaking European countries. It is awarded biennially or triennially.

The Salzburg Ceramics Awards are restricted to artists born or living in Austria, concentrating on working with clay or other ceramic materials. Two main prizes were awarded until 2007: One by the federal state government of Salzburg state (still valid, endowed now with 6000 Euro), and a second one by the Arts department of the Federal Chancellery (Austria) (ending 2010, formerly endowed with 3000 Euro). Additionally acknowledgements and grants (now endowed with 2500 Euro) are awarded.

Works by the award-winning artists and of the finalists were shown regularly in an exhibition at the gallery Trakl-Haus in the city of Salzburg, and sometimes in additional exhibitions in Austria.

== Salzburg Ceramics Award Winners ==
Jahr	Winner Salzburg Federal Prize	Winner Austrian State Prize	Acknowledgments and grants
1993	Barbara Reisinger	Martina Funder	Franz Josef Altenburg
1995	Gerold Tusch	Ulrike Stubenböck	Margit Denz
1998	Lilo Schrammel	Maria Baumgartner	Gabriele Hain, Canan Dagdelen
2001	Irmgard Schaumberger	Wilfried Gerstel	Gabriele Gruber-Gisler
2004	Elmar Trenkwalder	Thomas Stimm	Canan Dagdelen
2007	Kristiane Petersmann	Wilfried Gerstel	Lucas Drexel
2010	Charlotte Wiesmann		Kurt Spurey, Margit Denz
2015.	Frank Louis		Andreas Vormayr, Daniel Wetzelberger
