= Katrin und die Welt der Tiere =

- Country of origin: Germany
- No. of seasons: 2
- No. of episodes: 52

Katrin und die Welt der Tiere (Katrin and the World of Animals) is a German educational children's television series about animals that aired from 2009 to 2010 on Super RTL.

== Overview ==
Katrin (Helene Luise Doppler) is a 12-year-old girl living with her mother Birgit (Pamela Knaack). In most episodes of the show, an everyday problem leads Katrin to ask herself a particular question about an animal species, whereupon she goes visit her maternal uncle Andreas (Armin Marewski), a zookeeper, at his workplace. Among answering her specific question, he tells her interesting trivia about the animal of the day, and Katrin, who—unbeknownst to everyone else—is capable of understanding and talking to animals, frequently uses these opportunities to secretly chat with the specimens Andreas shows her. Back home, Katrin prints out a photo of the animal that she had taken at the zoo and hangs it on the giant world map corkboard in her bedroom, its spot corresponding to the animal's natural habitat, while summarizing what she had learned. The episodes end with Katrin using her new knowledge to solve her problem or deal with the situation.

Whenever Katrin asks herself the question of the day and summarizes her knowledge at the end of the episode, she talks to the viewer.

Each episode is interrupted by two short films showing the animal in the wild (unless the episode is about a domesticated species), with Katrin or Andreas telling additional trivia in a voiceover; these films are often preceded by a short comedic cartoon animation.

== Episodes ==
=== Season 1 ===
No.	Translated title	Air date
1	Kangaroos	11 January 2009
2	Seals	17 January 2010
3	Elephants	18 January 2009
4	Raccoons	17 January 2010
5	Camels	25 January 2009
6	Cats	23 January 2010
7	Monkeys	1 February 2009
8	Wolves	21 May 2009
9	Dogs	8 February 2009
10	Dolphins	21 May 2009
11	Bears	15 February 2009
12	Penguins	10 August 2009
13	Hippopotamuses	22 February 2009
14	Donkeys	10 August 2009
15	Horses	1 March 2009
16	Lions	31 July 2009
17	Giraffes	8 March 2009
18	Koalas	10 August 2009
19	Tigers	15 March 2009
20	Hedgehogs	30 January 2010

=== Season 2 ===
No.	Translated title	Air date
21	Gorillas	31 July 2009
22	Flamingoes	20 September 2009
23	Bees	27 September 2009
24	Foxes	27 September 2009
25	Deer	4 October 2009
26	Meerkats	4 October 2009
27	Hares	11 October 2009
28	Rhinoceroses	11 October 2009
29	Squirrels	18 October 2009
30	Owls	18 October 2009
31	Anteaters	25 October 2009
32	Snakes	25 October 2009
33	Chicken	20 February 2010
34	Cow	20 February 2010
35	Pigs	21 February 2010
36	Ponies	21 February 2010
37	Eagles	11 June 2010
38	Pelicans	12 June 2010
39	Parrot	13 June 2010
40	Stork	14 June 2010
41	Spider	15 June 2010
42	Squid	16 June 2010
43	Whale	17 June 2010
44	Shark	18 June 2010
45	Turtle	19 June 2010
46	Sloth	20 June 2010
47	Polar bear	21 June 2010
48	Bat	22 June 2010
49	Butterfly	23 June 2010
50	Chameleon	24 June 2010
51	Coral reef	25 June 2010
52	Crocodile	16 July 2010

== See also ==
- List of German television series
