= Schlatt, Austria =

Schlatt
- Municipality
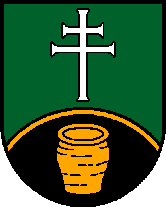
- Coat of arms

- Location within Austria
- Coordinates: 48°04′21″N 13°47′02″E
- Country: Austria
- State: Upper Austria
- District: Vöcklabruck

Government
  - Mayor: Christian Mader (ÖVP)

Area
  - Total: 11.01 km^{2} (4.25 sq mi)
- Elevation: 409 m (1,342 ft)

Population (2018-01-01)
  - Total: 1,399
  - Density: 127.1/km^{2} (329.1/sq mi)
- Time zone: UTC+1 (CET)
  - Summer (DST): UTC+2 (CEST)
- Postal code: 4691
- Area code: 07673
- Vehicle registration: VB
- Website: www.schlatt.at

Schlatt is a municipality in the district of Vöcklabruck in the Austrian state of Upper Austria.

== Population ==
Historical population
Year	Pop.	±%
1991	1,228	—
2001	1,338	+9.0%
2016	1,290	−3.6%
