= Paulus Manker =

Austrian film director and actor (born 1958)

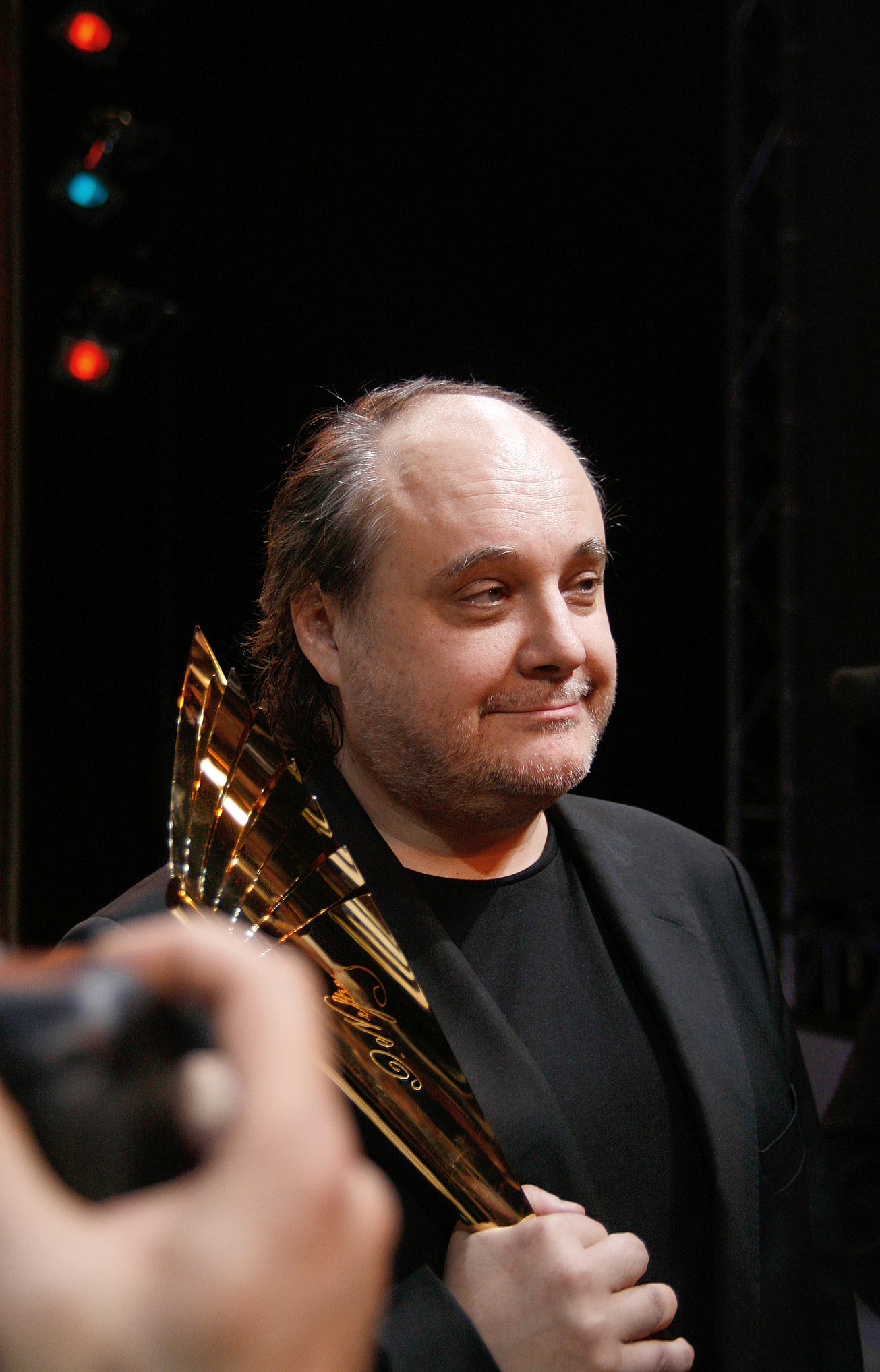
- Manker in 2010
- Born: 25 January 1958 (age 68); Vienna, Austria
- Occupations: Film director, actor
- Years active: 1979–present

Paulus Manker (born 25 January 1958) is an Austrian film director and actor, as well as an author and screenplay writer.

Manker is considered one of the most maverick German-speaking actors, and polarizes public opinion like scarcely no other. He is perceived as a "staggering all-round talent on the Austrian cultural scene."

== Life ==
Manker is the son of actress Hilde Sochor and theatre director Gustav Manker. He trained at the Max Reinhardt Drama School in Vienna, studying acting and directing. Manker made his film debut in Lemminge (Lemmings) (dir. Michael Haneke) in 1979.

Manker's initial engagements while still at drama school took him to the Viennese Burgtheater (1979, Arthur Schnitzler's Comedy of Seduction with set design by Hans Hollein and costumes by Karl Lagerfeld), then to the Vienna Festival (1980, The Last Days of Mankind by Karl Kraus), and on to participation in the "co-determination model" at the Schauspielhaus Frankfurt (1980/81), to the Thalia Theater in Hamburg (1982, Jean Genet's Deathwatch and also to the Residenztheater in Munich, where in 1983 he first worked with director Peter Zadek (Henrik Ibsen's The Master Builder with Barbara Sukowa), where he became a long-term member of Zadek's famous ensemble.

As a film actor, Manker first appeared in Lemmings in 1979 (directed by Michael Haneke). Then followed Exit – Don't Panic (1980) and The Locked-Out (1982, based on the novel by Elfriede Jelinek), 'The Power of Emotion by Alexander Kluge (1983) and Who Was Edgar Allan? (1984, also directed by Michael Haneke), as well as Luc Bondy's The Distant Land (1987), alongside Michel Piccoli.

In 1986, Peter Zadek invited Manker to join the famous ensemble at the Deutsches Schauspielhaus in Hamburg, of which he was a member from 1986 to 1989. Here, for the first time, he played on stage the leading role of anti-Semitic Jewish philosopher Otto Weininger in the play Weininger's Last Night by Joshua Sobol, which caused much furore. After that, he was Octavius Caesar in Shakespeare's Julius Caesar with Ulrich Tukur, Lindekuh in Frank Wedekind's Musik (Music) with Susanne Lothar, and slave trader Casti-Piani in Peter Zadek's legendary staging of Frank Wedekind's Lulu.

Manker first worked as a film director in 1985, and his film Schmutz (Dirt) premiered at the 1985 Cannes Film Festival in the Quinzaine des Réalisateurs. The film received several awards at other festivals, and was turned into a novel by Thorsten Becker. In 1988 there followed Weininger's Last Night, in 1992 The Eye of the Typhoon with German rock band Einstürzende Neubauten, in 1995 The Moor's Head, based on a screenplay by Michael Haneke with Gert Voss in his first film role, and Angela Winkler, then in 1996 the documentary film Hans Hollein – Everything is Architecture plus various short films including, in 2004, the portrait of his 80-year-old mother, actress Hilde Sochor.

"As a director, Manker experiments with psycho shockers (Dirt, Weininger's Last Night) and draws the audience into his aggressive multimedia theatre dramas. Manker's general theme is the creeping insanity of a society to which he holds up a distorting mirror."

Manker first worked as a director at the Vienna Volkstheater, with Weiningers Nacht (Weininger's Last Night) by Joshua Sobol, in which he himself also played the leading role, and which became his most famous role. The performance became Manker's greatest triumph to date, and he himself subsequently turned the play into a film.

In 1990, Manker returned to the Viennese Burgtheater under Claus Peymann, and took the role of Carlos in Peymann's production of Goethe's Clavigo (with Ulrich Mühe as Clavigo). He was also Bassanio in Peter Zadek's production of Shakespeare's The Merchant of Venice (with Gert Voss as Shylock and Eva Mattes as Portia), and Pozzo in Samuel Beckett's Waiting for Godot). In 1993, he staged Franz Molnar's Liliom at the Burgtheater, and in 1996 Bertolt Brecht's Threepenny Opera (with costumes by Vivienne Westwood).

In 1995, together with Niklas Frank, they adapted Frank's reckoning with his father Hans Frank, Hitler's governor-general in Poland. In 1996, Manker and Sobol created their most successful project to date: Alma – Widow of the four Arts, an interactive drama about Alma Mahler-Werfel, in which over 50 scenes were played simultaneously in the rooms of the art-deco Sanatorium Purkersdorf outside Vienna.

Manker's performance as Shakespeare's Richard III (1997), staged by Peter Zadek at the Münchner Kammerspiele, generated most heated discussions, where conflict arose with the theatre and its director Dieter Dorn, whereupon the production was cancelled despite its huge success with the public.

In 1996, Manker and Israeli writer Joshua Sobol, who became his most important artistic partner, created Alma – Widow of the four Arts at the former Sanatorium Purkersdorf, a simultaneous drama about artists' muse Alma Mahler-Werfel and her men, which became a cult play and has since been played every year at a different venue, having already crossed three continents and had over 400 performances in Vienna, Venice, Lisbon, Los Angeles, Berlin, Jerusalem and Prague. Between 1997 and 1999, the play was filmed under the title Alma – Widow of the 4 Arts as a 3-part TV film. In the production, produced by Manker himself, Manker also has the role of the expressionist painter Oskar Kokoschka.

In 2000, with the cyber-show F@lco at the Viennese Ronacher Theatre, Manker and Sobol created a multimedia musical about the pop star Falco. Then in 2003, continuing the collaboration with Sobol, an invitation came from Tel Aviv to stage at the Cameri Theatre the premiere of Sobol's iWitness, the story of Franz Jägerstätter, who refused to enter military service and was hanged by the Nazis, a parallel to the soldiers of the Israeli army who refused to serve in the Occupied Territories. The production made the young Itay Tiran a star.

Manker played the suicidal organist in Joseph Vilsmaier's Brother of Sleep (1994), as well as playing in Michael Haneke's The Castle (1998) and in Code Unknown with Juliette Binoche (1999). He also performed in Michael Glawogger's film Slumming, a 2006 entry in the Berlin Film Festival competition section; in this film, with a "hyperplastic presence", Manker portrays homeless alcoholic Franz Kallmann in the style of a poète maudit, "truly setting his role on fire" (ARTE).

Paulus Manker engaged in more theatre work with Luc Bondy (Ödön von Horvath's Figaro Gets a Divorce, 1998), with Christoph Schlingensief (Foreigners Out! Schlingensief's Container, 2000) and on repeated occasions with Peter Zadek (White Rabbit in Alice in Wonderland, 1996, Polonius in Hamlet, with Angela Winkler and Otto Sander, Hamburg, 2000), The Jew of Malta (2001) as well as in plays by Botho Strauss.

In 2010 Manker appeared in the Salzburg Festival as Theseus in the acclaimed production of Jean Racine's Phèdre, playing alongside Sunnyi Melles. In the same year, he published a comprehensive book about his father, film director, set designer and theatre director Gustav Manker.

In 2010, Manker was awarded the prestigious Nestroy Audience Award.

== Film direction ==
- 1985: Schmutz (Dirt) 1987 "Prize for the best director" and "Special recommendation for the soundtrack", Ghent / 1986 "Premio para a primeira obra", Troia 1986 / "Prix de la Commission Supérieure technique", Avoriaz / "Goldener Kader 1988", for cameraman Walter Kindler. Entered into the 15th Moscow International Film Festival.
- 1988: Weiningers Nacht (Weininger's Last Night) Austrian entry for European Film Award 1990 / "Golden Romy 1990" (Best director)
- 1992: Das Auge des Taifun (The Eye of the Typhoon) Documentary about a performance of Erich Wonder and Heiner Müller with German Rockband "Einstürzende Neubauten"
- 1995: Der Kopf des Mohren (The Moor's Head) based on a screenplay by Michael Haneke, Fimfestival Cannes 1995 / Prize for Best Films Distribution (Brussels 1995) Interfilm-Prize (Max Ophüls Prize Saarbrücken) Opening film of the Salzburg Festival 1995 (Festival hall)
- 1996: Hans Hollein – Everything is Architecture TV-documentary on Austrian architect Hans Hollein
- 1997: Alma – The Widow of the 4 Arts (The life of Alma Mahler-Werfel)
- 2004: Where Blade Runner meets Batman – Downtown Los Angeles
- 2004: Die Seele brennt heut wieder sehr' – Porträt Hilde Sochor (80)
- 2005: Mozart in America (Mozart Minute)

== Films as an actor (selection) ==
- 1979: Lemminge (dir. Michael Haneke), TV film
- 1980: Exit... nur keine Panik (dir. Franz Novotny)
- 1982: The Excluded (dir. Franz Novotny), TV film
- 1983: The Power of Feelings (dir. Alexander Kluge)
- 1984: Who Was Edgar Allan? (dir. Michael Haneke), TV film
- 1987: The Distant Land (dir. Luc Bondy)
- 1988: Sternberg - Shooting Star (dir. Niki List)
- 1988: My 20th Century (dir. Ildikó Enyedi)
- 1989: Weininger's Last Night (dir. Paulus Manker)
- 1990: Common Death (dir. Michael Schottenberg), TV film
- 1991: Murderous Decisions (dir. Oliver Hirschbiegel), TV film
- 1993: Heaven or Bust (dir. Peter F. Bringmann)
- 1994: Brother of Sleep (dir. Joseph Vilsmaier)
- 1996: The Castle (dir. Michael Haneke), TV film
- 1997: Alma (dir. Paulus Manker)
- 2000: Code Inconnu (dir. Michael Haneke)
- 2000: Wambo (dir. Jo Baier), TV film
- 2002: Die schöne Braut in Schwarz (dir. Carlo Rola), TV film
- 2002: Foreigners out! Schlingensiefs Container
- 2003: Polterabend (dir. Julian Pölsler), TV film
- 2004: C(r)ook (dir. Pepe Danquart)
- 2006: Slumming (dir. Michael Glawogger)
- 2014: Burning Souls (dir. Urs Egger), TV film
- 2015: Jack (dir. Elisabeth Scharang)
- 2022: Schächten (dir. Thomas Roth)
