= Alma (play) =

Alma is an example of site-specific promenade theatre (or more precisely a "polydrama") created by Israeli writer Joshua Sobol based on the life of Alma Mahler-Werfel. It opened in 1996, under the direction of Austrian Paulus Manker, at a former Jugendstil sanatorium building designed by architect Josef Hoffmann located in Purkersdorf near Vienna; and subsequently toured to locations in Venice, Lisbon, Los Angeles, Petronell, Berlin, Semmering, Jerusalem, and Prague.

Protagonist Alma Mahler-Werfel was intimately connected to a list of the famous creative spirits of the 20th century. She married sequentially composer Gustav Mahler, architect Walter Gropius, and poet Franz Werfel (“The Song of Bernadette”), and also had love affairs with the painters Oskar Kokoschka, Gustav Klimt, and several others.

The performance is not presented as a conventional theatre piece, but instead takes place throughout an entire building in simultaneous scenes highlighting the events and defining relationships of Alma's tumultuous life, with each playing area fully equipped with appropriate furniture and props.

Members of the audience can therefore choose to follow certain events, outcomes, and even individual characters from scene to scene, thus experiencing a uniquely personal version of Alma's life story. When Gustav Mahler dies halfway through the piece, his funeral can be followed interactively with his music; and at the interval, the entire audience comes together at a buffet dinner featuring Austrian cuisine during which they can compare notes about what they have each experienced, and develop a fuller perspective of the biographical events.

The production was also adapted as a three-part film.

== Sources ==
- official website
