= Yehoshua Sobol =

Israeli playwright, writer and theatre director

- יהושע סובול
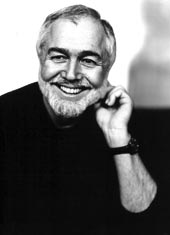
- Sobol in 1996
- Born: 24 August 1939; Tel Mond
- Education: The Sorbonne
- Occupations: Playwright, writer and director

Yehoshua Sobol, sometimes written Joshua Sobol (Hebrew: יהושע סובול; born 24 August 1939), is an Israeli playwright, writer, and theatre director.

== Biography ==
Yehoshua Sobol was born in Tel Mond. His mother's family fled the pogroms in Europe in 1922 and his father's family emigrated from Poland in 1934 to escape the Nazis. Sobol attended Tichon Hadash high school in Tel aviv. Sobol studied at the Sorbonne, Paris, and graduated with a diploma in philosophy.

Sobol is married to Edna, set and costume designer. They have a daughter, Neta, and a son, Yahli Sobol, a singer and writer. Born to a secular Jewish family, he identifies as an atheist.

== Theatre career ==
Sobol's first play was performed in 1971 by the Municipal Theatre in Haifa, where Sobol worked from 1984 to 1988 as a playwright and later assistant artistic director. The performance of his play The Jerusalem Syndrome, in January 1988, led to widespread protests, whereupon Sobol resigned from his post as artistic director.

In 1983, after the Haifa production of his play Weininger's Night (The Soul of a Jew), he was invited to participate in the official part of the Edinburgh Festival. Between 1983 and 1989 Sobol wrote three related plays: Ghetto, Adam and Underground, which constitute together The Ghetto triptych.

Ghetto premiered in Haifa in May 1984. It won the David's Harp award for best play. That year, Peter Zadek's German version of the play was chosen by Theatre Heute as best production and best foreign play of the year. It has since been translated into more than 20 languages and performed in more than 25 countries. Following Nicholas Hytner's production of the English-language version by David Lan at the Royal National Theatre of Great Britain in 1989, the play won the Evening Standard and the London Critics award for Best Play of the Year and was nominated for the Olivier Award in the same category. It was coldly received in New York, however. In his review of the play in the New York Times, Frank Rich described it as a "tedious stage treatment of the Holocaust."

Since 1995, Sobol has collaborated with Viennese director Paulus Manker on a number of projects exploring new forms of the theatrical experience.

In 1995, Der Vater (The Father) a work by Niklas Frank and Joshua Sobol commissioned for the Wiener Festwochen (Vienna Festival) opened at the Theatre an der Wien under the direction of Paulus Manker. The play is about Niklas Frank's father, Hans Frank, who was Hitler’s Governor general in Poland and was hanged in Nuremberg in 1946. In 1996, they created Alma for the Wiener Festwochen. Alma is a polydrama based on the life of Alma Mahler-Werfel. It played in Vienna for six successive seasons and toured to Venice, Lisbon, Los Angeles, Berlin, Jerusalem and Prague. In the Vienna production, the scenes of Alma’s life were performed simultaneously on all floors and in all rooms of a former Jugendstil sanatorium near Vienna. The guests were invited to abandon the immobilised position of spectator in a conventional drama, replace it with the mobile activity of traveller, thus partaking in a "theatrical journey". By choosing the events, the path, and the person to follow after each event, each participant constructed her or his personal version of the "Polydrama". In 2000, Sobol and Manker created F@LCO – A CYBER SHOW, a multimedia musical about the Austrian pop singer Falco. Staged in the former Varieté theatre Ronacher in Vienna, F@LCO offered the audience a choice between a more expensive, passive ticket for the boxes or the balconies, from which spectators could only watch the show from distance, or a cheap, "active" ticket on the floor, close to the rostrum (in the shape of @, the Internet at symbol) on which the show was performed. This position allowed the active spectator to move around during the show, dance and buy drinks at the bars installed under the catwalks.

== Plays ==
- 1971 THE DAYS TO COME – Haifa Municipal Theatre
- 1973 STATUS QUO VADIS – Haifa Municipal Theatre
- 1974 SYLVESTER 72 – Haifa Municipal Theatre
- 1975 THE JOKER – Haifa Municipal Theatre
- 1976 The Night of the Twentieth (Hebrew: ליל העשרים) Haifa Municipal Theatre
- 1976 NERVES – Haifa Municipal Theatre
- 1977 TENANTS – Haifa Municipal Theatre
- 1977 GOG & MAGOG SHOW – Zavta Cultural Club, Tel Aviv
- 1977 REPENTANCE – Zavta Cultural Club, Tel Aviv
- 1978 HOMEWARD ANGEL – Habima
- 1979 WEDDING NIGHT – Habima
- 1980 THE LAST WORKER – Beit Leissin Theatre, Tel Aviv
- 1981 WARS OF THE JEWS – Jerusalem Khan Theatre
- 1982 WEININGER'S NIGHT – Haifa Municipal Theatre
- 1984 GHETTO (Hebrew: גטו) Haifa Municipal Theatre; FREIE VOLKSBUHNE, Berlin
- 1984 PASODOBLE – Zavta Cultural Club, Tel Aviv
- 1985 PALESTINIAN GIRL – Haifa Municipal Theatre
- 1986 COUNTDOWN – Zavta Cultural Club, Tel Aviv
- 1987 Jerusalem Syndrome (Hebrew: סינדרום ישרולים) – Haifa Municipal Theatre
- 1989 ADAM – Habima
- 1991 UNDERGROUND – YALE REP. NEW HAVEN, USA
- 1991 SOLO – DE APPEL – THE HAGUE; Habima
- 1991 A&B – Dortmund
- 1991 EYE TO EYE – Mannheim (1994)
- 1992 RING TWICE – Royal National Theatre, Oslo 1997
- 1993 NICE TONI – Düsseldorfer Schauspielhaus, June 1994
- 1993 LOVE FOR A PENNY – ISRAELI YIDDISH THEATRE, 1994
- 1993 SCHNEIDER AND SHUSTER – BASEL 1994; Gorki Theater, Berlin
- 1994 THE MASKED BALL – Haifa Municipal Theatre (2001)
- 1994 BLOODY NATHAN – Volkstheater Wien, Vienna, 1996
- 1995 THE FATHER Wiener Festwochen, 1995.
- 1995 VILLAGE – Gesher Theatre, Tel Aviv (February 1996)
- 1996 ALMA – Vienna Festival Week, Vienna (1996)
- 1996 Honey (Hebrew: דבש) Haifa Municipal Theatre (1997)
- 1997 MA NI MA MAMA – Zavta Cultural Club, Tel Aviv, Festival of One Act Plays 97.
- 1997 HOME CINEMA Not yet produced
- 1998 Strangers (Hebrew: זרים) Habima (1999)
- 1999 FALCO RONACHER THEATER, Vienna, April 1, 2000
- 1999 LA TORANA (Not yet produced)
- 2000 Gebirtig (Hebrew: גבירטיג) based on Mordechai Gebirtig – Yiddishpiel (2000)
- 2000 17 TOP COMPAGNIETHEATER, Amsterdam 2002
- 2001 CROCODILES Herzliya Theatre (November 2001)
- 2002 HOMELESS BEN GURION
- 2002 iWitness (Hebrew: עד ראייה; lit. "eyewitness") based on the story of Franz Jägerstätter – Cameri Theater (2002)
- 2002 REAL TIME

== Directing ==
- GHETTO in Essen and Bremen, Germany
- GOLDBERG VARIATIONS, by George Tabori, Dortmund, Germany, 1993
- ADAM – in Manheim, Germany, 1993.
- SCHNEIDER AND SHUSTER – Basel Theatre, Switzerland, 1994
- NICE TONI – The Khan & The Jerusalem Theatre, September 1994
- GHETTO – Hartke Theatre, Washington D.C., 1995
- GENS [A comprehensive version of the Ghetto Triptych] – Weimar 1995
- GHETTO – Haifa Municipal Theatre, January 1998
- ALMA – Cameri Theatre, Tel Aviv, December 1998
- GHETTO – Wesleyan University Theatre, November 2000
- THE MERCHANT OF VENICE – Illinois Shakespeare Festival. 2002

== Teaching ==
- 1972–84 Actors Training School, Seminar Hakibutzim – Lecturer on Aesthetics
- 1972–84 Beit Zvi Actors Training School – Workshop Director: Writing Drama
- 1995–2002 Tel Aviv University – Workshop Director: Writing Drama
- 1997–98 Ben Gurion University, Beer Sheva – Lectures on Drama; Workshop: Writing Drama
- 1996–99 Sam Spiegel Film & TV School, Jerusalem – Script Writing Workshop
- 2000 Wesleyan University, Connecticut, USA – Documentary drama
- 2001 Tel Aviv University, Department of Literature – Lectures on Modern and contemporary Theatre
- 2001–02
- 2003 Bezalel School of Architecture – Ethics and Art
- Ben Gurion University Beer Sheva
- 2012 University of Washington – Guest Faculty: Playwriting

== Published works ==
(partial list)

- 1976 "Night of the Twentieth". Play (Hebrew) – Published by Proza, Tel Aviv
  - 1990 "Night of the 20th". Play (Hebrew) – Published by Or-Am, Tel Aviv
- 1982 "Soul of a Jew". Play (Hebrew) – Published by Or-Am, Tel Aviv
  - 1988 "Weiningers Nacht". Play (German) – Published by Paulus Manker, Vienna
  - 1991 "Weininger's Night". Play– Published by Cahiers Bernard Lazare, Paris
- 1984 "Ghetto". Play (Hebrew) – Published by Or-Am, Tel Aviv
  - 1989 "Ghetto". Play (English) – Published by Nick Hern Books, London
- 1985 "The Palestinian Girl". Play (Hebrew) – Published by Or-Am, Tel Aviv
  - 1998 "Palestinian Girl" (English). Published by Loki Books, London
- 1987 "The Jerusalem Syndrome". Play (Hebrew) – Published by Or-Am, Tel Aviv
- 1989 "Adam". Play (Hebrew) – Published by Or-Am, Tel Aviv
- 1990 "Underground". Play (Hebrew) – Published by Or-Am, Tel Aviv
- 1991 "Solo". Play (Hebrew) – Published by Or-Am, Tel Aviv
  - 1994 "Solo". Play (French & English) – Published by Cierec, Saint Etienne
- 1996 "Village". Play (Hebrew) – Published by Or-Am, Tel Aviv
- 1999 "Alma". Play (Hebrew) – Published by Or-Am, Tel Aviv
  - 1998 "Alma". Play (German) – Published by Paulus Manker, Vienna
- 2000 "Silence". Novel. Published by The New Library, Tel Aviv
  - 2001 "Schweigen" (Silence). Published by Luchterhand Literaturverlag, Munich
  - 2002 "Swijgen" (Silence) – Published by Byblos, Amsterdam
- 2002 "The Masked Ball". Play (Hebrew) – Published by Or-Am, Tel Aviv

== Awards ==
- 1976 – NIGHT OF THE TWENTIETH – David's Harp Award – Best Play of the Year
- 1976 – NIGHT OF THE TWENTIETH – David Pinski Award
- 1979 HOMEWARDS ANGEL – David's Harp Award – Israel's Best Play of the Year
- 1980 THE LAST WORKER – David's Harp Award – Israel's Best Play of the year
- 1982 WEININGER’S NIGHT – David's Harp Award – Israel's Best Play of the Year
- 1983 WEININGER’S NIGHT – Meskin Award for Best Play of the Year
- 1984 GHETTO – David's Harp Award – Israel's Best Play of the Year
- 1985 GHETTO – Theater Heute German Critics’ Choice – Best Foreign Play
- 1986 THE PALESTINIAN GIRL – Issam Sirtawi Award
- 1989 GHETTO – Evening Standard Theatre Award for Best Play of the Year – London
- 1989 GHETTO – Critics' Circle Theatre Awards – Best New Play
- 1990 GHETTO – Laurence Olivier Awards – Award Nomination – Best Play
- 1995 GHETTO – Mainichi Art Prize – Best play of the year – Tokyo, Japan
- 1996 GHETTO – Yumiuri Shimbun Grand Prize best play of the year – Tokyo, Japan
- 1996 GHETTO – Yoshiko Yuasa Prize – Best play of the year – Tokyo, Japan
- 2001 SILENCE – Sapir Award Nomination – Best Novel of the Year

== See also ==
- Culture of Israel
