= Hans Adametz =

Austrian ceramist

Hans Adametz (17 August 1896 – 26 September 1966) was an Austrian ceramist, sculptor and art educator.

== Life ==
Born in Vienna, Adametz attended the Ceramic College in Znojmo and studied with Oskar Strnad and Michael Powolny at the University of Applied Arts Vienna. He attended further training courses at the Gmunden Ceramic Workshops and at Wienerberg. He worked for the Keramos Wien. After teaching in Wiener Neustadt and Mödling, he was appointed to the HTBLVA Graz-Ortweinschule in Graz in 1922. He was a professor and art ceramist at the State College of Clay Industry in Znojmo. He was also a lecturer at the Technical University of Graz.

Adametz was a board member of the Steiermärkischer Kunstverein Werkbund.

Adametz died in Graz at the age of 70.

== Students ==
- Franz Josef Altenburg

== Exhibitions ==
=== Solo exhibitions ===
- Vienna
  - 1956 (with W. Berg);
  - 1962 (with A. Wahl and A. Birstinger)
- 1968 Graz, Joanneum (cat., 98 works)

=== Group exhibitions ===
- Graz, partly annually since 1926, Werkbund and Secession
- 1923, '27, '28, '53, '55 Vienna, Museum of Applied Arts
- 1924 Stuttgart: The form
- 1925 Paris, boarding school. Arts and crafts exhibition
- 1927 Berlin, German Ceramic Society
- 1928 Cologne, Pressa
- 1930 Stockholm, applied arts
- 1930 Warsaw, Austrian exhibition
- 1933 Milan, Triennale
- 1934 London, Austrian exhibition
- 1935 Brussels, world exhibition
- 1942 Strasbourg
- 1958 Passau: European Weeks
- Berlin-West, Werkbund
- 1960 Bremen, Werkbund
- 1961, 1965 Graz: Religions

== Works ==
- c. 1928: Keramik Frühlingsbotin
- 1933: Figur Mohr.
- 1939: Figur Adler – Teil des Anschlussdenkmals in Oberschützen.
- Keramiken Sitzende Frau, Der Zauberer, Liegende.

- Graz
  - Joanneum: figurative ceram. Plastic (6 major works).
  - Crematorium forecourt: people praying, life-size, around 1930 (removed in 1938).
  - Burg Ehrenhof: busts by J. J. Fux and J. B. Fischer von Erlach, Stein, around 1942, executed around 1950.
  - Chapel of the seminary: Herz-Jesu-Plastik, 1952/53 (formerly for the Sanatorium of the Cross Sisters).
  - Kanhäuser privately owned: several works.
- Seckau, private ownership: Christ.
- Vienna, Austria Gallery: 3 sculptures.
- Faenza, Mus. Internaz. delle Ceramiche.
