= Herta Staub =

Austrian writer, poet, and journalist

Herta Felicia Staub (21 December 1908, in Vienna – 18 August 1996, in Vienna) was an Austrian writer, poet, and journalist, best remembered for her poetry that dealt with fascism and war resistance. She served as the sole woman cultural editor for Wiener Zeitung from 1932 to 1938.
