= Wolfgang von Wersin =

German architect

Wolfgang von Wersin (3 December 1882 – 13 June 1976) was a Czech-born designer, painter, architect and author who developed his career in Germany.

Born in Prague, he studied architecture at the Technische University of Munich (1901—1904) and, in parallel (1902 to 1905), he also studied drawing and painting at the Lehr- und Versuch-Atelier für Angewandte und Freie Kunst ("Teaching and Experimental Atelier for Applied and Free Art"), a reform oriented art school in the same city. Then, from 1906 onwards, after he completed his military service, became a tutor there. His constant collaborator and eventual wife, the German printmaker and draughtswoman Herthe Schöpp (1888–1971), met him as his pupil. In 1909 he began working as a designer for numerous firms, including the Behr furniture factory and the Meissen porcelain manufacturers. In 1929, he assumed the directorship of the Neue Sammlung established in Munich in 1925, the department for artisan art at the National Museum – and remained there until his illegal dismissal by the national socialists in 1934.

In 1956 he wrote The Book of Rectangles, Spatial Law and Gestures of The Orthogons Described, in which he describes a set of 12 dynamic rectangles he calls orthogons.

== Style ==
Wersin's early designs are characterized by East-Asian forms; however, he eventually developed a style free of any kind clear of influence (including rural folk art) and achieved a timelessly classical style of great objectivity, revealed above all in articles for everyday use, such as porcelain, glass, tableware fabric and wallpaper.

== Orthogon information ==
Wolfgang Von Wersin's book about the Orthogons gives detailed information about how to construct and use a special set of 12 inter-related rectangles to create a design. They are similar to what Jay Hambidge called dynamic rectangles. The set of 12 Orthogons is determined by expanding a square through a series of arcs and cross-points until another square is formed on top, an exact duplication of the original square.

Wersin also explains in the book how Orthogons can be detected and used in architecture, ceramics, furniture and works of art.

The value of using Orthogons is explained in an excerpt that includes an extraordinary copy of text from the year 1558 (Renaissance). Diagrams of seven of the 12 orthogons are accompanied by a passage from the 1558 text cautioning that careful attention be given as the "ancient" architects believed "nothing excels these proportions" as "a thing of the purest abstraction."

One of the orthogons, the hemidiagon, is apparent in the designs of synagogues in ancient Galilee. Mathematical ratios and another source for the term Orthogon:

A well-known Orthogon, the Auron (golden rectangle), has been employed to create a range of designs from posters and chapels (Mies van der Rohe), to chairs. and glassware

The Auron is related to musical harmony, in that the golden ratio is among the most dissonant musical intervals, and is also included in discussions on sacred architecture and sacred geometry as well as information regarding dynamic symmetry and aesthetics.

According to Von Wersin, "The Orthogons are without exception root figures and are all irrational numbers. The calculations for measure relations of the Orthogons are based, without exception, on the Pythagorean doctrine." Examples of these root figure relations are: the Diagon relation is 1: square root of 2, the Sixton is 1: square root of 3 and the Doppelquadrat is 1: square root of 4.

Mathematical ratios for all twelve Orthogons:

Ratios for all twelve Orthogons:

Quadrat 1:1 – Hemidiagon 1:1.118 – Trion 1:1.154 – Quadriagon 1:1.207 – Biauron 1:1.236 – Penton 1:1.376 – Diagon 1:1.414 – Bipenton 1:1.46 – Hemiolion 1:1.5 – Auron 1:1.618 – Sixton 1:1.732 – Doppelquadrat 1:2

(Quadrat is the German word for square, and Doppelquadrat for double square.)

== See also ==
- Aesthetics
- Auron
- De architectura
- Dynamic symmetry
- Fibonacci number
- Georges Braque
- Giorgio Morandi
- Golden rectangle
- Golden section
- Logarithmic spiral
- Phi (letter)
- Religious art
- Sacred architecture
- Square root of 2
- Square root of 3
- Square root of 4
- Square root of 5
- Vitruvian Man

== Sources ==
- Albrecht Dürer, Of the Just Shaping of Letters, From the Applied Geometry of Albrecht Dürer Book; Dover Publications, NY, NY.
- Keith Critchlow, Order in Space: A Design Source Book; 1970, Viking, NY, NY.
- Kimberly Elam, Geometry of Design: Studies in Proportion and Composition; 2001, Princeton Architectural Press, NY, NY. ISBN 978-1-56898-249-6
- Jay Hambidge, The Elements of Dynamic Symmetry; 1967, Dover Publications, NY, NY.
- Hemenway, Priya; Divine Proportion, Phi in Art, Nature and Science; 2005, Sterling Publishing Co., Inc, NY, NY.
- Michael S. Schneider, A Beginner's Guide to Constructing the Universe: Mathematical Archetypes of Nature, Art, and Science; 1994, Harper Paperbacks. ISBN 0-06-092671-6
- Alfred Ziffer; Wolfgang Von Wersin 1882–1976 Vom Kunstgewerbe zur Industrieform; 1991 Klinkhardt & Biermann, Munchen, Germany.
