= Anna-Lülja Praun =

Austrian architect

Anna-Lülja Praun (née Simidoff; 29 May 1906, in Saint Petersburg – 28 September 2004, in Vienna) was an Austrian architect and designer. One of the first female architects to study architecture at Graz University of Technology, she received a Cross of Honour for Science and Art in 2001.
