= HTBLVA Graz-Ortweinschule =

School in Graz, Austria

Coordinates: 47.0922°N 15.4223°E

The HTBLVA Graz-Ortweinschule is a high school in the Geidorf district of Graz, Austria.

== History ==
Archduke John of Austria founded a trade association, which established a drawing class for locksmithing, masonry, and carpentry in 1837 at the Universalmuseum Joanneum. Within the framework of the Trades Association, a winter school for master builders and foremen also began in 1866. In 1872, the trade association founded the Styrian Art Industry Association in the Schießstatt building in Pfeifengasse, later Ortweinplatz. The Schießstatt building was extensively rebuilt, and in 1876 the school was elevated to the status of Staatsgewerbeschule with August Ortwein as the director, and a yearly technical school for civil engineering was established alongside the winter school. With the spin-off of the mechanical and electrical engineering subjects, the Höhere technische Bundeslehr- und Versuchsanstalt Graz-Gösting was established in 1919 and the Staatsgewerbeschule was renamed the "Bundeslehranstalt für das Baufach und Kunstgewerbe". From 1926 to 1932, a new school building was constructed on Ortweinplatz according to the plans of the architect Adolf von Inffeld. Since 1987, the school has been located in a new building on the Körösistraße in the north of Graz, next to the BRG ("Bundesrealgymnasium") Körösi, which is on the corner of Ortweingasse.

== Education programs ==
Department of Civil Engineering

- Structural engineering (Hochbau)
- Civil engineering (Tiefbau)
- Timber construction (Holzbau)
- Construction industry (Bauwirtschaft)

Department of Art and Design

- Graphics and communication design (Grafik- und Kommunikationsdesign)
- Film and multimedia art (Film und MultimediaArt)
- Photography and multimedia art (Fotografie und MultimediaArt)
- Interior design room and object design (Innenarchitektur Raum- und Objektgestaltung)
- Product design presentation (Produktdesign Präsentation)
- Sculpture object design restoration (Bildhauerei Objektdesign Restaurierung)
- Ceramics art craft (Keramik Art Craft)
- Jewellery metal design (Schmuck Metall Design)

== Principals ==
- 1876–1879: August Ortwein
- 1879–1902: Carl Lauzil
- 1902–1911: August Gunolt
- 1919–1934: Adolf von Inffeld
- 1934–1935: Ferdinand Pamberger
- 1935–1938: Eduard Populorum
- 1940–1945: Rudolf Hofer
- 1945–1949: Eduard Populorum
- 1956–1974: Otto Pilecky
- 1974–1991: Horst Altenburger
- 1991–1993: Peter Trummer
- 1993–2012: Reinhold Neumann
- 2012: Friederike El-Heliebi
- since 2012: Manfred Kniepeiss

== Well-known alumni and instructors ==
- Annemarie Avramidis
- Maria Biljan-Bilger
- Erwin Bohatsch
- Hans Brandstetter
- Günter Brus
- Karl Fischl
- Wilhelm Gösser
- Marion Kreiner
- Monika Martin
- Franz Leopold Schmelzer
- Werner Schwab
- Soap&Skin
- Markus Wilfling
