= Lukas Miko =

Austrian actor, screenwriter and film director

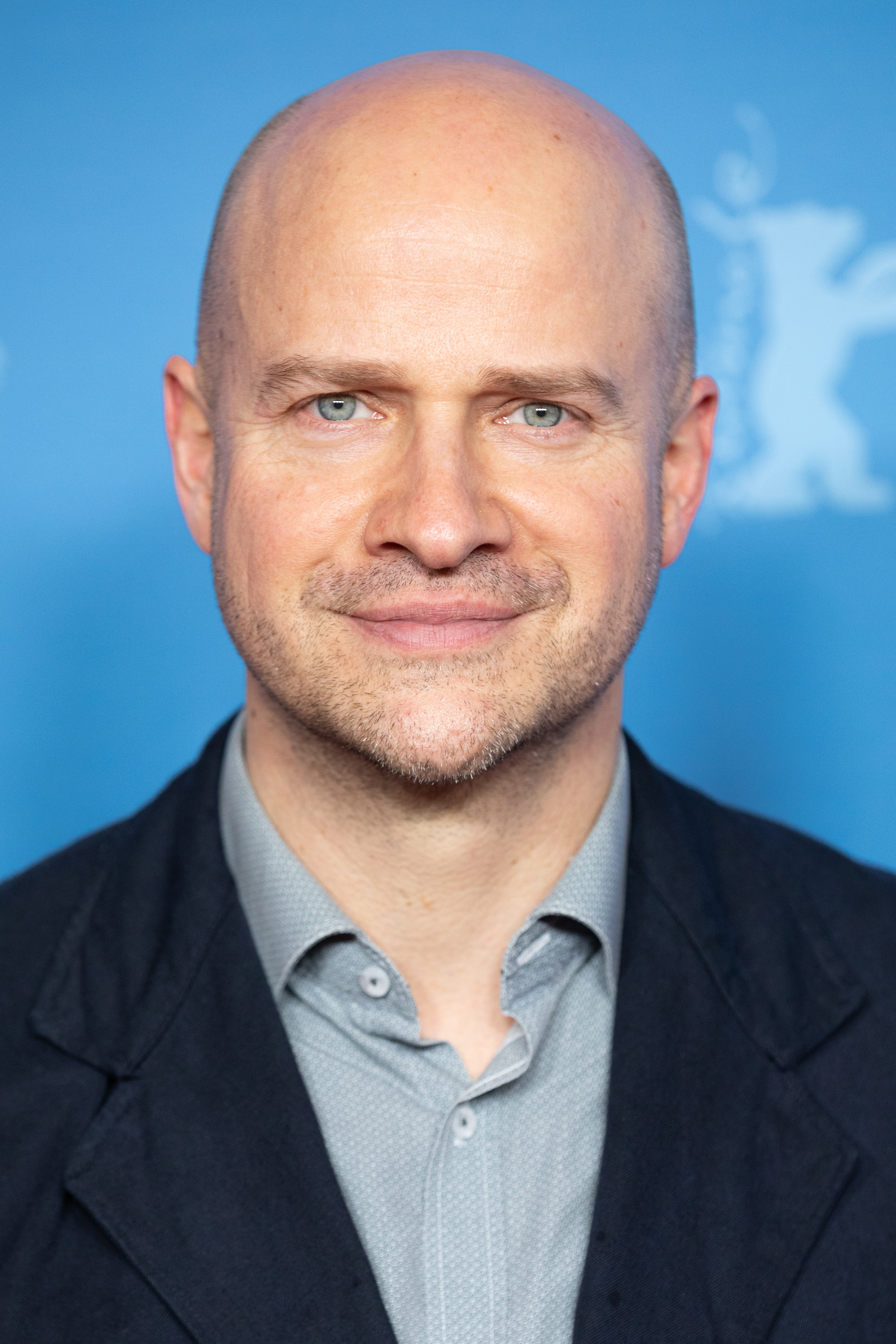
Lukas Miko (2020)

Lukas Miko (born 4 April 1971 in Vienna) is an Austrian actor, screenwriter and film director.

== Life and career ==
Miko completed his Matura in Vienna in 1989 and subsequently joined the ensemble of George Tabori’s theatre group Der Kreis. From 1990 to 1992 he studied at the Max Reinhardt Seminar in Vienna, followed by studies at the Conservatoire de Paris from 1992 to 1993. After returning to Austria he was cast by Michael Haneke in the leading role of his film 71 Fragments of a Chronology of Chance, portraying Max, a sports student who commits a seemingly motiveless shooting spree shortly before Christmas. For his performance he was nominated as Best Young European Actor at the French film festival "Stars de Demain" (a precursor of European Shooting Stars) and received a special mention by the jury.

From 1994 to 1999 he was a company member of the Residenztheater in Munich, and from 1999 to 2002 was part of the ensemble of the Burgtheater in Vienna. He later appeared as a guest actor at Theater Basel, Stadttheater Klagenfurt and in independent productions, including Paulus Manker’s theatre installation ALMA – A Show Biz ans Ende, performing the role of Gustav Mahler.

In cinema he has portrayed a wide range of characters, including Auschwitz survivor Hermann Langbein in Austria's 2016 Oscar submission Labyrinth of Lies directed by Giulio Ricciarelli; a far-right lawyer in Night of a 1000 Hours by Virgil Widrich; the strict father of blind pianist Maria Theresia Paradis in Mademoiselle Paradis by Barbara Albert; and a heroin-addicted stepfather in the award-winning film The Best of All Worlds by Adrian Goiginger. For the latter he won the Austrian Film Award in 2018 as Best Supporting Actor.

On television he gained wide attention playing an intriguing, manipulative antagonist in the mini-series Altes Geld directed by David Schalko. He later appeared as cult leader Brunner in the Sky series Pagan Peak (2019) and as psychiatrist Max de Crinis in season two of Charité (2019). In Markus Schleinzer’s feature film Angelo (2018) he portrayed Joseph II, Holy Roman Emperor, and in 2020 he played war criminal Georg von Lichtenberg in the Netflix series Freud directed by Marvin Kren.

In 2005 Miko wrote his first screenplay and in 2006 directed the 30-minute short film Das gefrorene Meer. The film received multiple awards, including the German Short Film Award in Gold in 2007.

Miko is one of the initiators of #KlappeAuf, an Austrian film industry initiative against hate speech and promoting solidarity. At the Austrian Film Award ceremony in 2018 he delivered a widely noticed speech on behalf of the movement.

At the 2021 Diagonale film festival he received the acting award for his role as Gerald in Me, We by David Clay Diaz.

In 2024 he received the Diagonale Grand Acting Award for "Outstanding Contribution to Austrian Film Culture".

== Theatre ==
Residenztheater Munich (selected roles)

- 1994: Twelfth Night – Orsino – Directed by Matthias Fontheim
- 1995: Kannibalen by George Tabori – Laci – Directed by Klaus Emmerich
- 1996: Der Gute Gott von Manhattan – Jan / God – Directed by Carlos Manuel
- 1997: Philosophy in the Bedroom by Marquis de Sade – Chevalier – Directed by André Wilms
- 1998: Die Gelehrtenrepublik by Arno Schmidt – Charles Winer – Directed by Carlos Manuel
- 1998: A Report to an Academy – The Ape – Directed by Michael Degen

Burgtheater Vienna (selected roles)

- 1999: La hija del aire – Lycas – Directed by Frank Castorf
- 2000: John Gabriel Borkman – Erhart – Directed by Nicolas Brieger
- 2000: Troilus and Cressida – Troilus – Directed by Declan Donnellan
- 2001: The Sea (Bond play)|The Sea – Willie Carson – Directed by Andrea Breth
- 2001: Roberto Zucco – Brother – Directed by Klaus Michael Grüber
- 2002: 4.48 Psychosis – Patient – Directed by James Macdonald

Theater Basel

- 2003/04: Hedda Gabler – Lövborg – Directed by Stephan Müller

Stadttheater Klagenfurt

- 2006/07: Jedem das Seine – Elias Rothenburg – Directed by Michael Sturminger

Former Telegraph Office Vienna (independent production)

- 2008: ALMA – A Show Biz ans Ende – Gustav Mahler – Directed by Paulus Manker

== Filmography ==
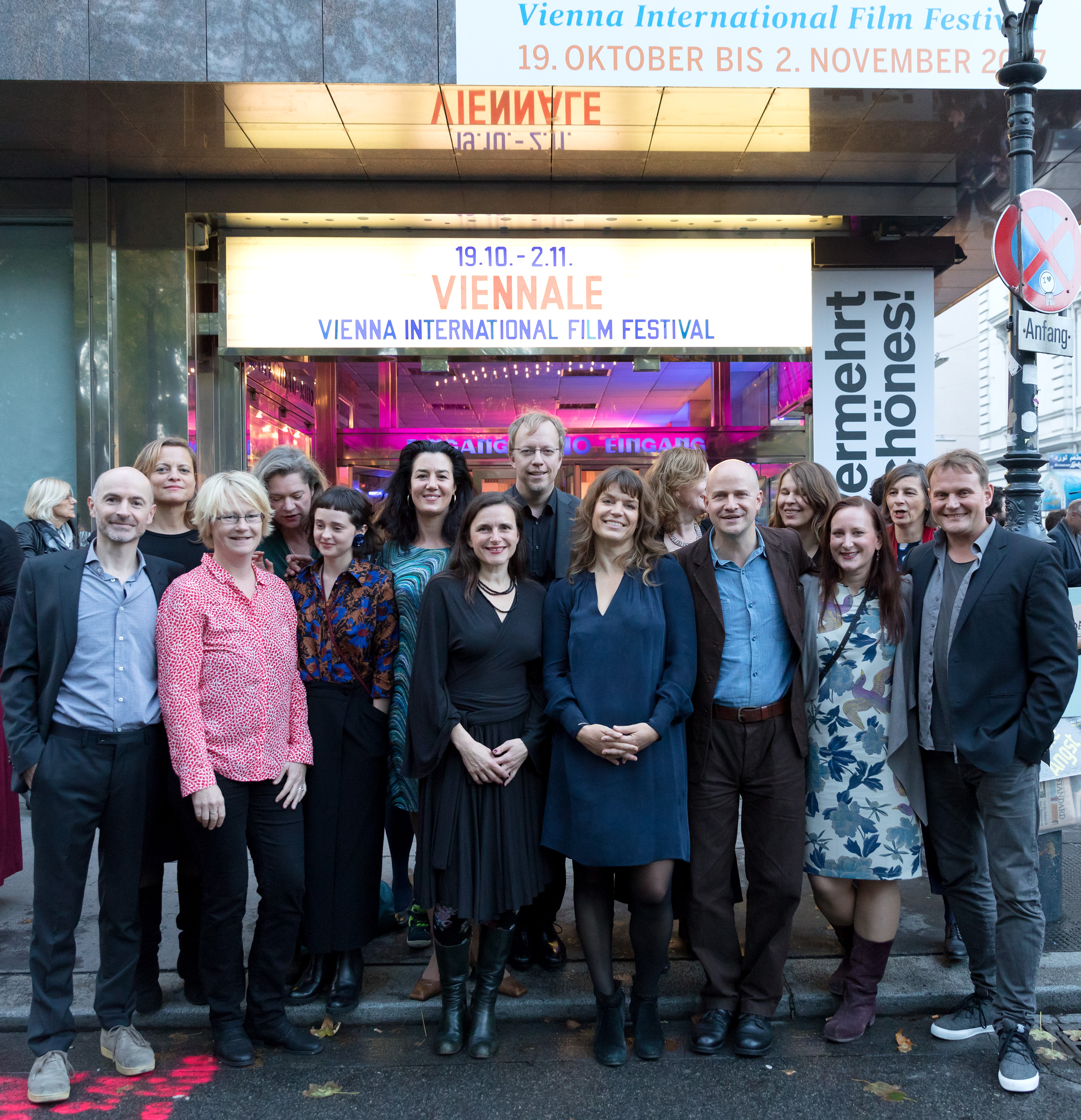
Miko with director Barbara Albert and part of the team of Mademoiselle Paradis (Viennale 2017)

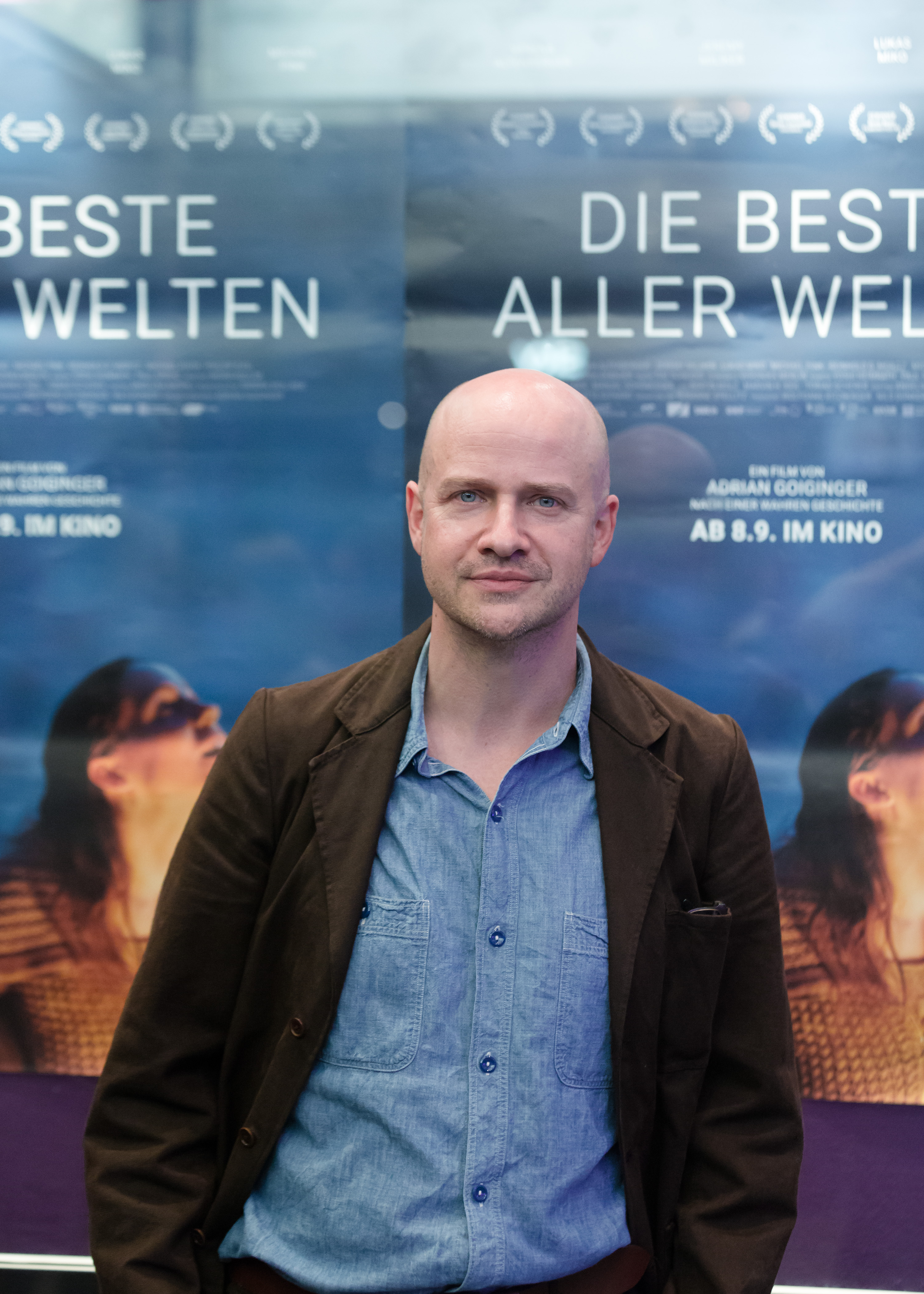
Vienna premiere of The Best of All Worlds (2017)

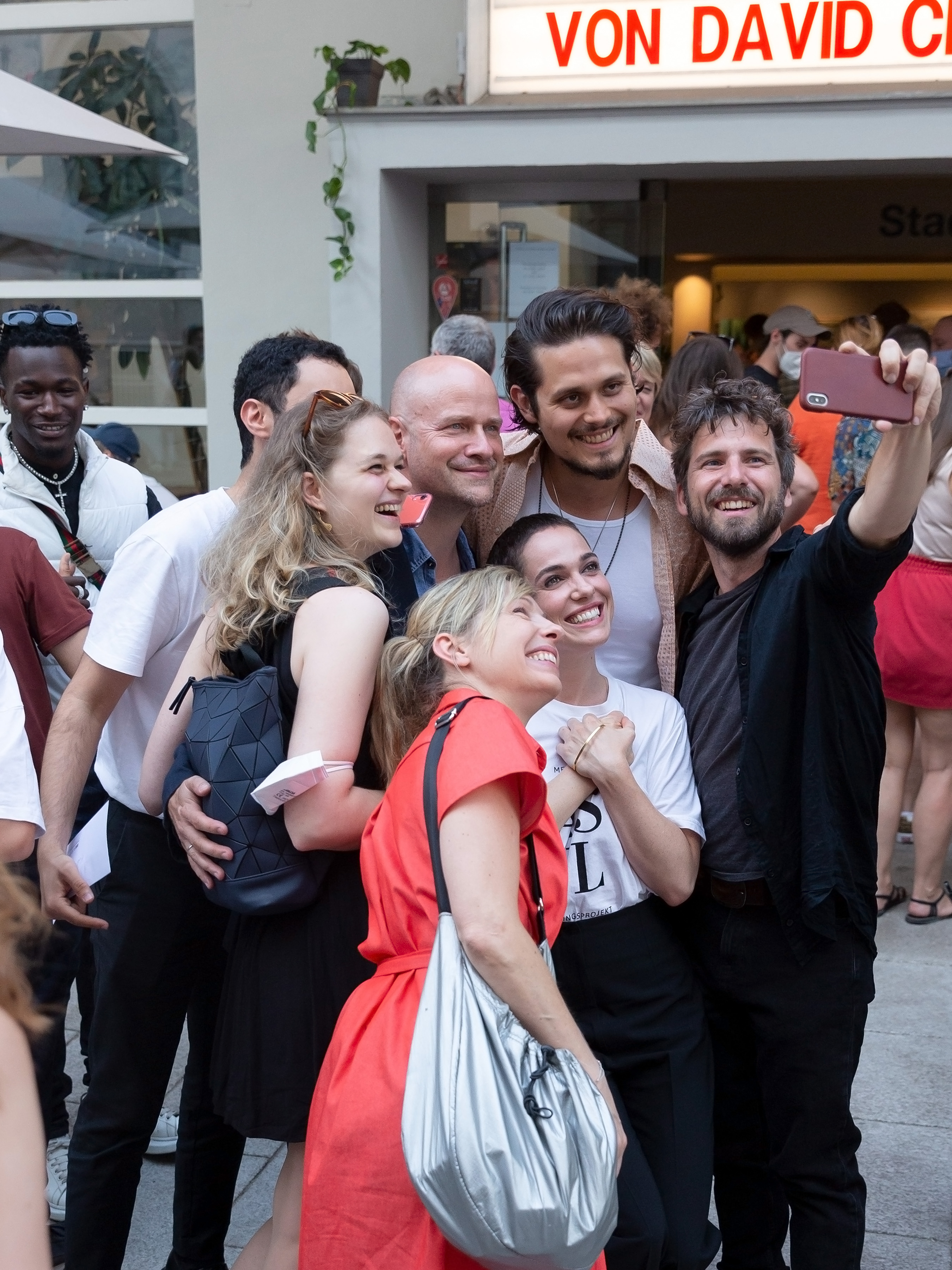
With Verena Altenberger, David Clay Diaz and part of the team at the Vienna premiere of Me, We (2021)

Selected acting roles (unless otherwise noted)

Feature films

- 1994: 71 Fragments of a Chronology of Chance (dir. Michael Haneke)
- 1996: Prélude (dir. Stefan Panzner)
- 1997: Comedian Harmonists (dir. Joseph Vilsmaier)
- 1999: Sterne (dir. Kabel Kain)
- 2005: Fräulein Phyllis (dir. Clemens Schönborn)
- 2008: Darum (dir. Harald Sicheritz)
- 2010: Spain (dir. Anja Salomonowitz)
- 2014: Labyrinth of Lies (dir. Giulio Ricciarelli)
- 2016: Night of a 1000 Hours (dir. Virgil Widrich)
- 2017: Mademoiselle Paradis (dir. Barbara Albert)
- 2017: The Best of All Worlds (dir. Adrian Goiginger)
- 2018: Angelo (dir. Markus Schleinzer)
- 2021: Me, We (dir. David Clay Diaz)
- 2021: Chess Story (dir. Philipp Stölzl)
- 2023: Stella. A Life (dir. Kilian Riedhof)
- 2024: Persona Non Grata (dir. Antonin Svoboda)
- 2024: Ein Abend im Dezember (dir. Matthias Kreter)
- 2025: Dracula

Television films

- 1998: Opernball (dir. Urs Egger)
- 2001: Spiel im Morgengrauen (dir. Götz Spielmann)
- 2007: Die Flucht (dir. Kai Wessel)
- 2014: Das Ende der Geduld (dir. Christian Wagner)
- 2019: Spuren des Bösen – Sehnsucht (dir. Andreas Prochaska)

Television series

- 1997: Tatort – Aida
- 2003: Bella Block – Deadly Closeness
- 2015: Altes Geld
- 2018: Pagan Peak
- 2019: Charité
- 2020: Freud
- 2023: De Stamhouder

Short films

- 2002: Norwegen (dir. Maike Wetzel)
- 2006: Das gefrorene Meer (writer, director)
- 2023: Er so sie so (dir. Benjamin Heisenberg)

== Awards ==
- 1994: "Stars de Demain" – Nomination for Best Young European Actor
- 2006: Max Ophüls Prize – Nomination for Best Short Film (Das gefrorene Meer)
- 2007: German Short Film Award in Gold (Das gefrorene Meer)
- Filmfest Dresden – Golden Rider Audience Award (Das gefrorene Meer)
- Diagonale 2008 – Thomas Pluch Screenplay Award (development prize)
- Austrian Film Award 2018 – Best Supporting Actor (The Best of All Worlds)
- Diagonale 2021 – Acting Award (Me, We)
- Diagonale 2024 – Grand Acting Award
