= German Directors Guild =

Association representing German film and TV directors

The German Directors Guild (German: Bundesverband Regie; BVR) is an association representing film and television directors in Germany. Its functions include protection of their members' rights to assert authorship; minimum fees; filming conditions; and liaising with government and other bodies to advocate for various issues affecting their members. From 2012 to 2018 it awarded film awards known as the Metropolis Film Award (also referred to as the German Directors Guild Awards).

== History ==
The Bundesverband Regie e. V. (BVR) was formed in 1975, following the example of the Société des réalisatrices et réalisateurs de films in France, to represent film directors in Germany.

The BVR celebrated its 35th anniversary at the 2010 Berlinale, as well as holding its annual General Assembly. The anniversary party was attended by over 600 people, and a new German director prize was announced.

On 1 March 2024, the BVR joined the UrheberAllianz (UA), an organisation founded in 2018 to jointly represent the interests of film authors

== People ==
Volker Schlöndorff is an honorary president of the BVR.

Screenwriter, author, and filmmaker Marie Noëlle (a.k.a. Marie Noëlle Sehr) was managing director of the BVR from 2018 to 2022, and sat on the Oscars nomination jury panel as the BVR representative.

== Activities ==
=== Member representation ===
With more than 580 members, the BVR is the largest association of film and television directors in Germany, and represents the artistic, social, legal, economic, and labour interests of filmmakers from the areas of cinema, television, documentary, dubbing, music video, and other areas. It has representatives on the boards of the Filmförderungsanstalt (FFA; the German Federal Film Board) and the German Media Council (Deutschen Medienrat). It has regular contact with the Federal Government Commissioner for Culture and the Media (BKM). It negotiates minimum rates of pay, as well as filming conditions and copyrights, with streaming services, broadcasters, and producer associations.

The BVR was signatory to the 2024 Declaration of Filmmakers (Declaration des Cineastes / Die Deklaration der Filmemacher:innen), a document drawn up collaboratively by 14 associations, which affirms the moral rights of filmmakers regarding the protection of their works by copyright.

=== Advocacy ===
In 2007, the BVR called for a review of the German Federal Film Fund, following the collapse of a production deal for Jan de Bont's project Stopping Power, which was due to be filmed in Berlin.

At the meeting of the BVR General Assembly in 2010, two major decisions were taken:

- BVR would take public broadcaster ZDF to court, for not having implemented the Authors Contract Law of 2002, and evading properly paying writers of content
- On request by members, the board would negotiate new terms for film funding laws, to improve conditions for authors and directors

In 2024, the BVR, along with the German Screenwriters Guild, the alliance of film and TV producers, the federal acting association, and the producers association, called for public broadcasters to commit to investing at least half of their budgets to making shows, in an open letter to German state and federal governments outlining their "50+ for Programming" plan. Public television was being criticised by Germany's growing far-right populist movement, including the AFD.

=== Awards ===
In 2012, the BVR established a new award, known as the Metropolis Film Award), the biggest German film award for directors. Winners of the directing prize receive a "Metropolis" statuette as well as prize money worth more than US$60,000 (€55,000) (as of 2015). A gala ceremony is held in November, where the awards are presented.

The awards were expanded to include various categories. Edward Berger's film Jack won Best Director and Best Picture at the German Directors Guild Awards in 2015.

In 2017, the Metropolis Best Director award was presented for the seventh time, to Austrian director Adrian Goiginger for his debut feature film The Best of All Worlds, with Verena Altenberger winning Best Actress for her role in it. Roland Klick won the Lifetime Achievement Award, and a new award, the Jannet Fechner Award, was established, for an assistant director for their life's work. Helga Asenbaum was the recipient of the inaugural prize.

In 2018, the drama Styx won the Best Director award for Feature Film (Wolfgang Fischer), and (Susanne Wolff won Best Actress for her role in the film. A German-Brazilian co-production directed by Hans Block and Moritz Riesewieck, The Cleaners, won the Best Documentary Directors Award Metropolis.

There does not appear to be evidence of the Metropolis awards continuing beyond 2018.

=== Oscars nomination jury ===
In 2017, a representative of Directors Guild was one of nine members of the independent jury appointed by German Films to represent Germany in the Oscars. The other members were representatives from the German Producers Association, the German Producers Alliance/Cinema Section, the Association of German Film Exporters, the Association of German Film Distributors, the Association of German Exhibitors, the German Film Critics Association, and the German Film Academy. In that year, they chose In the Fade, directed by Fatih Akin, as Germany's official submission for the 90th Academy Awards, in the Best Foreign Language Film category.

=== Publications ===
In 2014 the BRV published their first diversity report, "Erster Regie-Diversitätsbericht des BVR, 2010-2013". Data and methodology from this report (among others) were used by the European Women's Audiovisual Network to compile a Europe-wide report on women in the film industry in 2015, as well as a 2020 report looking at international figures on women creatives.

It has since published updated diversity reports, as well many others on topics such as copyright and funding.

== See also ==
- List of German submissions for the Academy Award for Best International Feature Film
