= Kenda Hmeidan =

Syrian voice actress (born 1992)

Kenda Hmeidan (born September 13, 1992) is a Syrian actress who lives and works in Germany.

== Life and career ==
Kenda Hmeidan was born on September 13, 1992, in Damascus, Syria, and completed her acting studies in 2015 at the renowned Higher Institute of Dramatic Arts (HIDA) in Damascus. She appeared in numerous plays both in Syria and Beirut, Lebanon. Soon after completing her degree during the Syrian civil war she left Syria and emigrated to Germany.

From 2016 to 2024 Hmeidan was a permanent member of the Exil Ensemble at Berlin's Maxim Gorki Theater and worked under a number of directors, such as Oliver Frljić, Sebastian Nübling and Yael Ronen. During that time she helped develop a play titled Eine Zusammenfassung von allem, was war (English: A summary of all that happened), based on a book by the Syrian writer Rasha Abbas, who also lives in exile in Germany.

Critics have singled out Hmeidan's performances in a miniseries for German television (ZDF) titled Liberame – Nach dem Sturm (2022) and in the feature film Tage mit Naadirah (2024) written and directed by Josephine Frydetzkis.

In 2025 she played the leading role of Rashida York in Burhan Qurbani's feature film No Beast. So Fierce. in a cast that included Verena Altenberger and Hiam Abbass. In a drama set in modern-day Neukölln, the plot revolves around a family feud and power struggle between the Yorks and Lancasters, as two Arab clans. The film takes inspiration from William Shakespeare's play Richard III. The film had its world premiere on February 14, 2025, at the 75th Berlin International Film Festival.

Since 2016 Kenda Hmeidan has lived in Neukölln, Berlin, a city which she values for its large expatriate community of Syrians. Besides her mother tongue of Arabic, she is fluent in German and English.

== Selected filmography ==
- 2022: Liberame – Nach dem Sturm (Miniserie)
- 2024: Tage mit Naadirah
- 2025: No Beast. So Fierce.

== Selected radio plays ==
- 2018: Leyla Rabih, Mohammed al Attar: Mein fremdes Land – Director: Anouschka Trocker – Rundfunk Berlin-Brandenburg)
- 2018: Daniela Herzberg: Home Care (Souad) – Director: Daniela Herzberg (Rundfunk Berlin-Brandenburg)
- 2019: Swoosh Lieu: Who moves?! Director: Katharina Pelosi, Rosa Wernecke Norddeutscher Rundfunk/Deutschlandradio)
- 2022: Serotonin: Sauerei (Aktivist) – Director: Serotonin (Deutschlandradio)

== Selected plays ==
At Maxim Gorki Theater:

- 2018: Elizaveta Bam – Director: Christian Weise
- 2019: Die Hamletmaschine – Director: Sebastian Nübling
- 2020: Hamlet – Director: Christian Weise
- 2022: Dantons Tod / Iphigenie – Director: Oliver Frljić
- 2022: Mutter Courage und ihre Kinder – Director: Oliver Frljić
- 2022: Eine Zusammenfassung von allem, was war – Director: Sebastian Nübling
- 2023: Amerika – Director: Sebastian Baumgarten
