= Thomas Gnielka =

German journalist

- Born: 1928; Berlin, Germany
- Died: January 1965 (aged 36–37); Herold, West Germany
- Education: Kant-Gymnasium (secondary school), Berlin-Spandau, Germany
- Occupations: Child soldier, journalist/reporter
- Spouse: Ingeborg Euler

Thomas Gnielka (1928 – January 1965) was a West German journalist.

Aged 15, he was one of a group of senior boys from his Berlin secondary school to be conscripted for war service. The boys were sent to a base near Auschwitz. Given a number guard assignments at the concentration camp during the second part of 1944, Gnielka became aware of various Shoah atrocities several months before the arrival of the Red army in January 1945 opened the way for the Nazi atrocities to become more widely known. He never forgot those experiences, and as an investigative reporter for a regional newspaper reporter in the 1950s and early 1960s he played a pivotal role in ensuring that these more nightmarish aspects of Nazi Germany could not simply be forgotten. A file of papers passed on by Thomas Gnielka to the state Generalstaatsanwalt (prosecutor) Fritz Bauer triggered the Auschwitz Trials of 1963–65 in Frankfurt, although Gnielka himself died of skin cancer some months before August 1965 when the court delivered its verdicts on the twenty defendants.

== Life ==
=== Child soldier ===
Thomas Gnielka was born and grew up in Berlin. Towards the end of the Second World War he was conscripted to serve as a "Luftwaffenhelfer" (child soldier). With fellow pupils from the Kant-Gymnasium (secondary school) in Berlin-Spandau he was sent in 1944 to the Auschwitz region. Their mission was to defend the IG Farben plant there: duties included supervising the emaciated concentration camp inmates who were sent out each day to be used for forced labour. One of the tasks the boys were required to supervise involved the construction of a protective wall around the plant. The Soviet army arrived to liberate the concentration camp complex on 27 January 1945. Half an hour before they arrived the German child soldiers escaped and fled towards the west. A few survived. Gnielka was one of the survivors.

=== Journalism and marriage ===
After the war Gnielka volunteered for an Internship with the newspaper Spandauer Volksblatt, based in the Berlin quarter where he had grown up. Through the internship he came across Hans Werner Richter who had recently launched his influential Group 47 young writers' group. Richter's advice was simple: "Schreib dir alles von der Seele" (loosely "write everything from your soul"). It was advice which Thomas Gnielka would follow throughout his career as a journalist. Later he moved to Munich where in 1948 he met and teamed up with the cabaret artiste (subsequently better known for her work as an author and television journalist) Ingeborg Euler. He set her lyrics to music and accompanied her on the piano when she appeared on the stages in the Simpl quarter of Munich, generally seen as one of the city's "entertainment hubs": as often as not they would perform together in exchange for no more than a hot dinner. They were married towards the end of 1949, settling in Munich. Between 1950 and 1962 the marriage produced five recorded children. During (or shortly before) the early 1960s they relocated from Bavaria to the "Dillenberger Mühle" (old mill house) at Herold, a village in the hills between Koblenz and Wiesbaden.

=== Traumatic memories ===
In May 1952 Gnielka was invited to join the twice yearly meetings of Hans Werner Richter's Group 47 writers' circle. (His wife had been attending since 1949.) At his first meeting he read from his "novel", which sixty-two years later would be published with the title "Geschichte einer Klasse" ("The story of a [school] class [group]"). The "dismally authentic" text concerns a group of school classmates sent from Berlin to serve as Flakhelfer directly beside the Auschwitz concentration camp complex during the closing part of the Second World War.

=== Wiesbaden ===
In 1956 he took a job as a local reporter with the Wiesbadener Kurier (regional newspaper). With effect from 11 February 1957 he switched, becoming the Wiesbaden local editor for the Frankfurter Rundschau, a regional newspaper launched twelve years earlier which had already acquired a national reach.

At the beginning of 1959 Gnielka received an unexpected reaction to an article he had produced the previous year for the Frankfurter Rundschau on the situation in the Wiesbaden Versorgungsamt (Social Security Office). Gnielka, in his article, had expressed concern that office employees were processing compensation claims from surviving holocaust victims, if at all, only with great reluctance: some of the clerical employees were prepared to identify themselves as former Nazis. According to Gnielka's report, approximately 50,000 compensation claims were sitting unprocessed in a large heap. Applicants were being treated with a marked absence of courtesy, and old Nazi-era antisemitic songs could sometimes be heard from the back offices.

=== Visit from an Auschwitz survivor ===
On 14 January 1959 Gnielka received a visit from an Auschwitz survivor called Emil Wulkan. The concentration camp had been (formally) liberated on 27 January 1945. In May 1945 Wulkan had found himself in Breslau (as Wrocław was still known at the time). Wulkan arrived with a little bundle of files neatly tied up with red ribbon, which had been rescued by Wulkan or a friend from outside what remained of the main SS building and, adjacent to it, "Polizeigerichts XV" ("Police court 15"), in the rubble that had been the Agnesstraße. The files, a somewhat grisly souvenir of the destructive siege of Breslau, had been blown into the street by the fire storm that engulfed the buildings on 8 May 1945. Wulkan stated that there had been more papers, but when they had gone back to retrieve these, they found the papers they were looking for had been destroyed by fire.

Thirteen years later, still in possession of those papers, Wulkan had read Gnielka's article about the situation in the Wiesbaden Versorgungsamt and had come to invoke Gnielka's support in his attempts to progress his own compensation claim. When Wulkan left the office, on top of the little sideboard that might normally have accommodated a drink or a small portion of cheese, there was instead the bundle of papers, still tied around with the red ribbon.

When he looked at the files left behind by Emil Wulkan, Gnielka found that they dated from 1942. They included a numbered listing compiled with characteristic care and precision which showed the names of Auschwitz detainees who had allegedly been "shot while trying to escape" ("auf der Flucht erschossen"). Also identified by name were the "successful" National Socialist paramilitaries ("SS members") involved in the shootings. The document was stated to have been completed by the camp commander ("Kommandatur Konzentrationslager Auschwitz"), and it was indeed personally signed by Rudolf Höß who had overseen the construction of the concentration camp complex around an old army barracks, and served between 1940 and 1943 as camp commander.

=== Fritz Bauer ===
The state prosecutor for the state of Hessen at this time was a man called Fritz Bauer who was by this time already active in the post–war efforts to obtain justice and compensation for victims of the Nazi regime, and was already investigating suspected war crimes committed at the Auschwitz concentration camp during the Hitler years. Finding evidence that would stand up in court was a major challenge for Bauer, however. On the evening of 14 January 1959, after working through the files he had received from Emil Wulkan, Thomas Gnielka arrived home looking "really green faced" (er ist "ziemlich grün im Gesicht nach Hause gekommen"), according to his wife. Ingeborg Euler recalled that Thomas Gnielka made a telephone call to Prosecutor Bauer, and a car was sent round to collect the files later that evening. Other sources state that it was only on the next day, 15 January 1959, that the journalist sent the papers with the signature of the concentration camp commander over to the prosecutor's office. They arrived with a brief (seventeen line) cover letter from Thomas Gnielka. Bauer immediately allocated two staff in his office to the case. The named perpetrators of the shootings had managed to leave their Nazi pasts behind them, but they were now sought out and, over time, arrested. In the end the prosecutor managed to find some 1,500 witnesses. There followed nearly five years of meticulous preparation. But when the Frankfurt Auschwitz trials opened in 1963 it was widely acknowledged that the entire investigation had been made possible by the handing over of those vital files by Thomas Gnielka.

=== Political journalist: investigative journalist ===
Gnielka remained a member of the Frankfurter Rundschau editorial team till September 1960. After that he was able to become a freelance journalist, although many of his contributions continued to be for the Frankfurter Rundschau. He also wrote regularly for Metallzeitung, the newspaper of West Germany's powerful IG Metall trades union, for the illustrated newsmagazine Quick and for the Munich-based news magazine Weltbild. As a political correspondent he specialised in "National Socialist continuity", identifying former Nazis who were now hiding in plain view as "respectable citizens" in post–war West Germany, and in some cases exercising influence as members of associations, political parties or employees with government authorities or agencies. Increasingly this meant operating not so much as a political journalist, but more as an investigative journalist. A particularly high-profile case in point was Richard Baer, who served, in Gnielka's words, "as the last and cruellest of the camp commanders" ("der letzte, grausamste Kommandant des Lagers") at Auschwitz between May 1944 and the establishment's hasty dissolution and abandonment (by the Germans) in January 1945. After the war he seemed to have disappeared.

He located and visited the home of Baer's wife, Maria, in Hamburg. Maria was not at home, but her sister was. Gnielka found the answers provided by Baer's sister-in-law "cautious", and her overblown praise for the human qualities of her sister's "exemplary husband" unpersuasive. Gnielka returned home and produced a report which was published in a German illustrated magazine: in his article, he aired his suspicion that Richard Baer was at liberty, leading the "life of a respectable citizen under a false name" ("...irgendwo unter einem falschen Namen das Leben eines Biedermanns..."). The article's impact was no doubt enhanced by the large portrait of Richard Baer at its head. Immediately after its appearance, Richard Baer was recognised by a co-worker on the family estate and former retirement home of Chancellor Bismarck where he was employed as a "forestry concierge", using the name "Neumann". Baer was arrested shortly afterwards, and died a few months later while still being held in pre-trial detention.

=== Death and celebration ===
The Auschwitz Trials opened on 20 December 1963. By this time Thomas Gnielka was less in the public eye, increasingly content to work from home in the old village mill-house in Herold from where he witnessed the trial, like most people, through the prism of press reports by others. Thomas Gnielka had been diagnosed with skin cancer earlier that year, and by the time the trial ended, on 19 August 1965, he was dead. His death had been reported in the Frankfurter Rundschau of 8 January 1965 under the headline "Rebell gegen die Trägheit" ("Rebel against inertia"). The report continued, "Nothing made him more angry than the attempts of the old die-hard [atrocity deniers] to keep on cleaning up the old rag dolls [of falsehood] and put them back in the shop window" ("Nichts konnte ihn mehr erbittern, als die Versuche der Ewiggestrigen, die alte Lumpenpuppe frisch aufgeputzt ins Schaufenster zu stellen."). At his funeral in Herold the oration was delivered by his friend, the writer Heinrich Böll.

Left with five children to look after, his widow now moved with the family to Frankfurt where she now plunged into a full-time career as a television journalist with Hessischer Rundfunk. With regard to childcare responsibilities, she was able to team up with her own mother, who had been widowed just six months earlier.

== Film ==
The history of the Auschwitz Trials of 1963–65 was disclosed to a new generation in 2014 in the drama movie Labyrinth of Lies (Im Labyrinth des Schweigens) written and directed by Giulio Ricciarelli. The part of Thomas Gnielka was played by André Szymanski.
