= Roman Osin =

British cinematographer

- Born: 1961 (age 64–65); Leipzig, East Germany
- Occupations: Director, Cinematographer, Photographer

Roman Osin (born 1961, Leipzig, East Germany) is a British cinematographer of German-Nigerian descent.

== Education ==
Osin studied at London College of Printing (now London College of Communication) from 1981 to 1985, taking a BA in Film and Photography, and later National Film and Television School from 1991 to 1995.

== Career ==
After leaving the College of Printing, Osin started as director of music videos, and also directed three dance movies commissioned by the Arts Council.

Since September 2005, Osin has been a member of the British Society of Cinematographers.

== Filmography ==
=== Feature film ===
Year	Title	Director	Notes
2001	The Warrior	Asif Kapadia	
2001	Under the Stars	Christos Georgiou	
2002	Big Girls Don't Cry	Maria von Heland	
2002	I Am David	Paul Feig	
2004	Mickybo and Me	Terry Loane	
2005	The Return	Asif Kapadia	
2005	Pride & Prejudice	Joe Wright	
2007	Far North	Asif Kapadia	
2007	Mr. Magorium's Wonder Emporium	Zach Helm	
2010	Neds	Peter Mullan	
2012	Won't Back Down	Daniel Barnz	
2014	The Games Maker	Juan Pablo Buscarini	With Matías Mesa
2014	Labyrinth of Lies	Giulio Ricciarelli	With Martin Langer
2015	The Rezort	Steve Barker	
2016	The Autopsy of Jane Doe	André Øvredal	
2016	The Exception	David Leveaux	
2019	Scary Stories to Tell in the Dark	André Øvredal	
2020	Mortal	André Øvredal	
2023	The Last Voyage of the Demeter	André Øvredal	Uncredited
