= Ingeborg Euler =

German journalist (1927–2005)

- Born: 6 September 1927; Breslau, Silesia, Germany
- Died: 20 March 2005 (aged 77); Kladow (Berlin), Germany
- Occupations: cabaret artiste writer television journalist
- Spouse: Thomas Gnielka (1928–1965)

Ingeborg Euler (6 September 1927 – 20 March 2005) began her public career as a cabaret artiste and author. After the early death of her husband, the campaigning "Auschwitz journalist" Thomas Gnielka, she herself became more widely known as a German television journalist.

== Life ==
Ingeborg Euler was born in Breslau (now Wrocław), her parents' only child. Her upbringing was a secure one apart from the impact on the entire family of her father's traumatic wartime experiences. By the time she enrolled at school in 1934, they were living in Dresden. In 1937, after only three years at primary school, she moved on to secondary school in the Steglitz quarter of Berlin, then in 1942 passing her Abitur as a pupil at the secondary school in Zossen, just outside Berlin. At school she participated in drama, playing a lead male role – that of Ferdinand in Schiller's play, Intrigue and Love, in a wartime production by the school's drama society.

World War II ended in May 1945. The country faced a desperate shortage of working age population, notably among teachers, and under the Neulehrer scheme imposed by the military administration, she embarked on a career as a "new teacher" at a school in Brusendorf without needing to train and qualify in the way that would have been required in more normal times. However, in 1946 she enrolled at Berlin University (subsequently known as "The Humboldt") where she was the youngest female student of her year group at the philosophy faculty. After the war the western two-thirds of Germany had been divided into four large military occupation zones. Berlin had been subdivided into four separate occupation zones. The eastern part of the city, incorporating the university, was part of the Soviet occupation zone. As a student Inge Euler also pursued her active interest in stage work, appearing alongside Ursula Herking and Jo Herbst in student cabaret shows.

In November 1947 an Arts Commission ("Kommission des Kulturbundes") initiative was publicised in newspapers aimed at young people, intended to identify new writers from the younger generation who had not, till that point, had their work published. In February 1948 Ingeborg Euler was one of the young authors "discovered" in the followup. Her piece "Zwischen heut und morgen" ("Between today and tomorrow") appeared in the youth magazine Horizont. The next year her short story "I wanted to go to the Wannsee" ("Ich wollte nach Wannsee fahren") had received a special commendation from the (East) German Arts League ("Kulturbund der DDR") and appeared in the July edition of the news magazine "Ost und West". (The Soviet occupation zone was relaunched, formally in October 1949, as the Soviet sponsored German Democratic Republic (East Germany).)

Directly after the war, the full political and practical implications of the military division of Berlin were not immediately apparent, least of all to the city's traumatised residents, preoccupied with simply staying alive. People could move freely between the western enclaves and the eastern half of the city, administered by the Soviet Union, until well into the 1950s. As early as April 1946, she had placed herself on record as an advocate of open free speech. Writing a review in Horizont about a meeting at the local cinema in Rangsdorf, held in anticipation of the first democratic local elections since 1933, she urged her young readers, who had grown up till that point learning the advisability of remaining "silent" on political matters, to speak out: "How can we seek to build a democratic state if we dare not say what we think?" (Note: German: Wie wollen wir uns denn einen demokratischen Staat aufbauen, wenn wir nicht einmal wagen, unsere Meinung zu sagen?). With the twelve Nazi years having come to an end, it was a time of hope. During the next couple of years the cinema became a regular meeting point for a group of young people who founded a theatre group, on the initiative of the local Soviet commander: Ingeborg Euler became a star of this improvised local stage.

True to her belief in sharing her views, in 1948, Ingeborg Euler addressed a letter to the allied military commanders controlling Berlin. She was promptly arrested and detained in a Soviet administered jail in East Berlin and accused of espionage. It was only through the energetic persistence of her mother, who was able to call upon backing from prominent celebrities in good standing with the Soviet authorities, including Johannes R. Becher, Gustav von Wangenheim and Günther Weisenborn, that after eleven days she was released and unceremoniously flown out of the city, ending up in Frankfurt am Main, which was in the western part of occupied Germany and a principal administrative base for the United States occupation zone. She quickly moved on to Munich, also in the American zone, which is where she now built a new life.

It was in Munich that she met Thomas Gnielka. He set her lyrics to music and accompanied her on the piano when she appeared as a young cabaret artiste in the Simpl quarter of Munich, as often as not performing together in exchange for no more than a hot dinner. The two of them were married towards the end of 1949. Between 1950 and 1962 the marriage produced five recorded children. It was therefore as a family of seven that in 1963 they relocated to the Wiesbaden area in connection with Thomas Gnielka's work.

In October 1949 Euler was introduced to the meetings of Group 47, a prominent circle of writers organised by (and around) Hans Werner Richter. The first meeting in which she participated was held in the extreme south of Upper Bavaria at Utting on the shores of the Ammersee (lake). At the meeting she presented her Wannsee text ("Ich wollte nach Wannsee fahren") and her poem "Wer war Andreas?" ("Who was Andreas?"), a literary tribute to her fallen childhood sweetheart. In 1956 she published her light hearted "Küchengeschichten" ("Rales from the kitchen"). Euler would later describe 1956 and the years immediately following it as a "very intensive, but also political time" ("sehr intensive, aber auch politische Zeit ") for them both. By this time Gnielka had also accepted the invitation, in 1952, to join Group 47. He was working during this time as a regional editor at the Wiesbadener Kurier, until he switched to an equivalent post at the Frankfurter Rundschau in February 1957. In 1960, he became a freelance investigative journalist. In 1963, he embarked on the investigation for which he would become well known across Germany, unearthing important files for what became known as the second Auschwitz trial, which involved the arrest of the former camp commander, Richard Baer. Before and during the trial, which opened on 20 December 1963, Gnielka was able to testify regularly on the atrocities committed. However, he was diagnosed with skin cancer in 1963, and in 1965, before being able to complete his contribution to the court proceedings, he died.

During the early 1960s, she was commissioned to produce several documentaries for Hessischer Rundfunk, the Frankfurt-based broadcaster on contemporary history themes, including a major project on the Second World War and another on workplace accidents in industry. After she was widowed Ingeborg Euler, with her five children now aged between 3 and 15, moved from Wiesbaden to Frankfurt am Main. Both to recover from the shock of her bereavement and to finance the family she now plunged into a full-time career as a television journalist with Hessischer Rundfunk. Her mother, who had been widowed six months earlier, supported her well in combining her family and professional lives. In 1969, she switched to ZDF. The focus of her work, again, was on documentaries including the memorably titled "Beton ist fantastisch" ("Concrete is fantastic") and features on artist-celebrities. She worked on the broadcaster's long-running arts magazine series Aspekte. Her so-called "Bamberg films" were notably successful: her film "Was soll aus Bamberg werden?" ("What should become of Bamberg?") won a prize for the ZDF arts magazine Aspekte.

In 1973, the family moved again, this time to West Berlin. Here, from 1977 until the mid-1980s Ingeborg Eurler produced the series "Berlinische Berichte", a series of films comprising half-hour "Berlin portraits" of different quarters and suburbs of the city, and other films for the ZDF which were transmitted during peak viewing times during the early evenings. In addition to these, she was particularly proud of a "science fiction" film, "Radfahrerstadt" ("Cyclists' city") which dealt with cycling as a serious means of transport. Other topics that she tackled included the city's architecture and more television portraits of celebrity artists such as Johannes Grützke, Matthias Koeppel, Joachim Schmettau and Matthias Schultze, along with Christa and Karlheinz Biederbick.

In 1980, Euler acquired an old workshop, which became a second home, in Eschwege (not far from Kassel). This provided space for her to explore her creativity as a painter and sculptor. Around 1985 she retired from her media career to devote more time to her own artistic ambitions and to her family. At a reunion in 1992, she met up with Alfred Hintze, a classmate half a century early when they were at school together in Zossen. Like her, he was widowed, and their relationship moved on to the point at which they moved together to a new home in Rangsdorf, just outside Berlin on its south side. Hintze retained his Berlin apartment and they were therefore able to keep in touch with city life and became frequent visitors to the university where they were able to attend lectures on subjects that interested them. Towards the end of her life, Ingeborg Euler was diagnosed with inoperable cancer. She died in Berlin well supported by her family. By the time she died she had not merely produced five children, but also acquired eight grand children and two great-grandchildren.
