= Ricciarelli (surname) =

Ricciarelli (pronounced [rittʃaˈrɛlli]) is an Italian surname from Tuscany and Umbria, derived from a pluralized diminutive of riccio 'curly-haired'. Notable people with the name include:

- Daniele Ricciarelli (c. 1509–1566), best known as Daniele da Volterra, Italian painter
- Giulio Ricciarelli (born 1965), Italian-German actor, director and film producer
- Katia Ricciarelli (born 1946), Italian soprano
