= Hansi Jochmann =

German actress

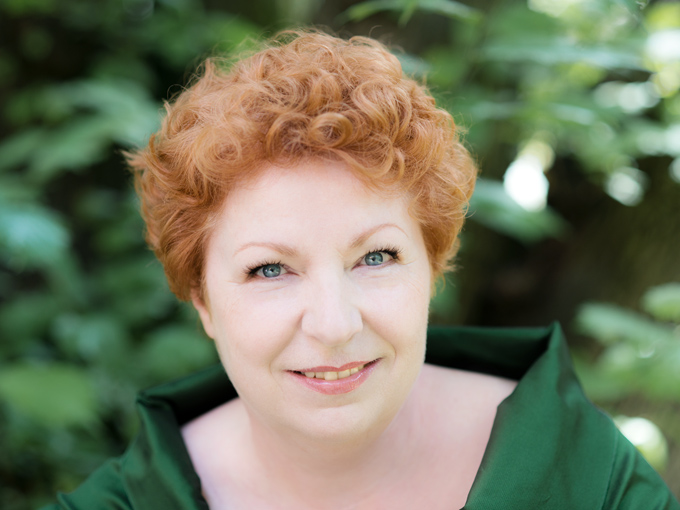
- Hansi Jochmann in 2014
- Born: 19 February 1953 (age 73); West Berlin, West Germany
- Occupation: Actor
- Years active: 1960–present

Hansi Jochmann (born 19 February 1953) is a German actress. She appeared in more than seventy films since 1960.

She is the German dubbing voice of Jodie Foster.

== Selected filmography ==
Film
Year	Title	Role	Notes
2014	Labyrinth of Lies		
1996	Victory		
1992	Shining Through		
1960	The Fair		

TV
Year	Title	Role	Notes
2003–2011	Pfarrer Braun	Margot Roßhauptner	
