= Night of a 1000 Hours =

2016 Austrian–Luxembourgish–Dutch feature film directed by Virgil Widrich

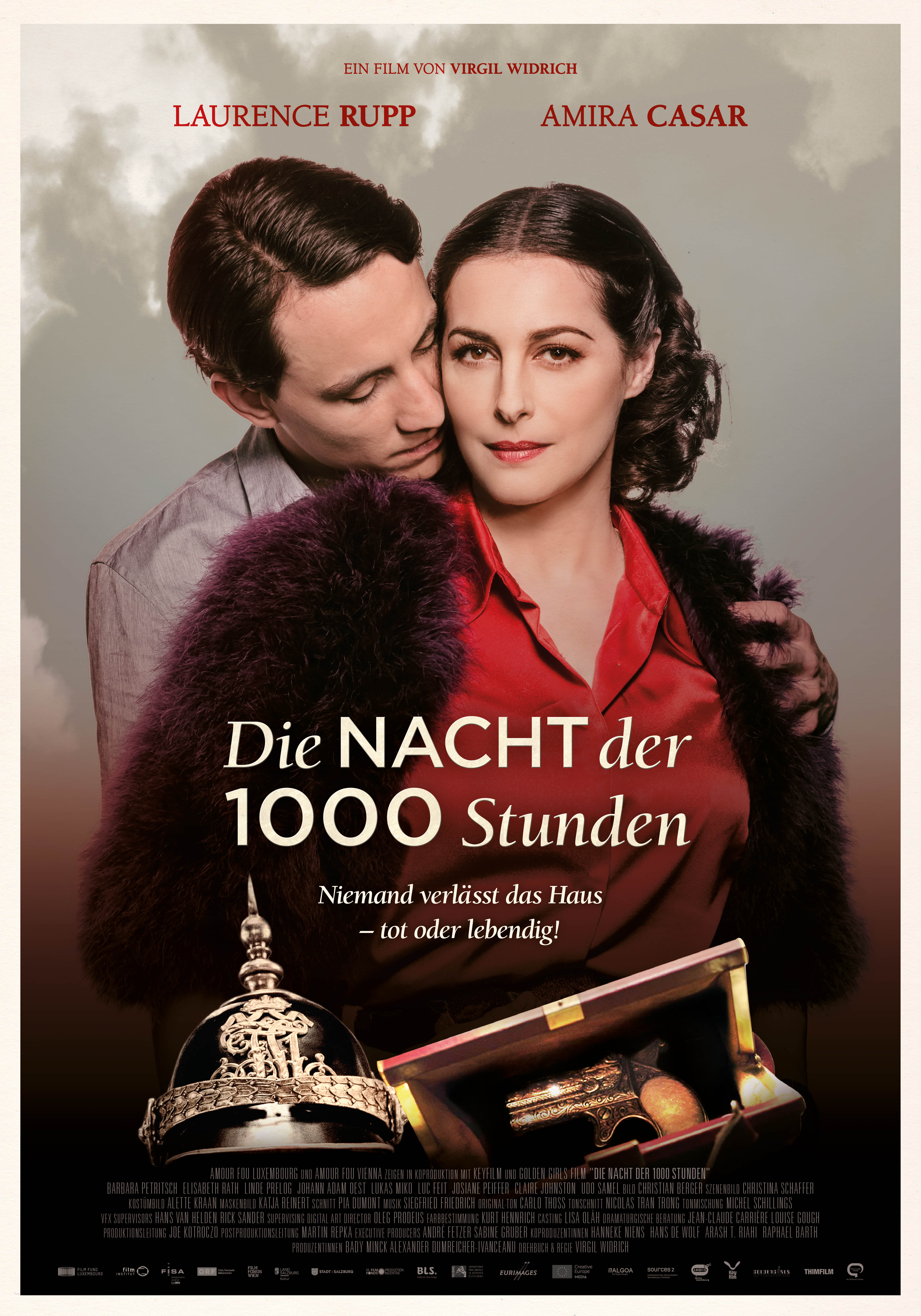
- Film poster
- Directed by: Virgil Widrich
- Written by: Virgil Widrich
- Cinematography: Christian Berger
- Edited by: Pia Dumont
- Music by: Siegfried Friedrich
- Production companies: Amour Fou Luxembourg; Amour Fou Vienna; KeyFilm; Golden Girls Filmproduktion
- Distributed by: Picture Tree International
- Release date: October 10, 2016 (Busan International Film Festival)
- Running time: 92 minutes
- Country: Luxembourg / Austria / Netherlands
- Language: German

Night of a 1000 Hours (German: Die Nacht der 1000 Stunden) is a 2016 Austrian–Luxembourgish–Dutch drama film written and directed by Virgil Widrich. Blending elements of mystery, family saga and the supernatural, the film premiered at the Busan International Film Festival in October 2016, where it won the Flash Forward Audience Award. It was later released theatrically in Austria and screened at more than 50 international festivals.

== Plot ==
Members of the Ullich family gather at their ancestral residence in Vienna to reorganize the family business. During a single, increasingly uncanny night, deceased ancestors start to reappear and long-buried secrets surface. Philip Ullich (Laurence Rupp), the heir apparent, falls in love with Renate (Amira Casar) — later revealed to be an ancestor — collapsing boundaries between past and present and forcing a reckoning with guilt, inheritance and desire.

== Production ==
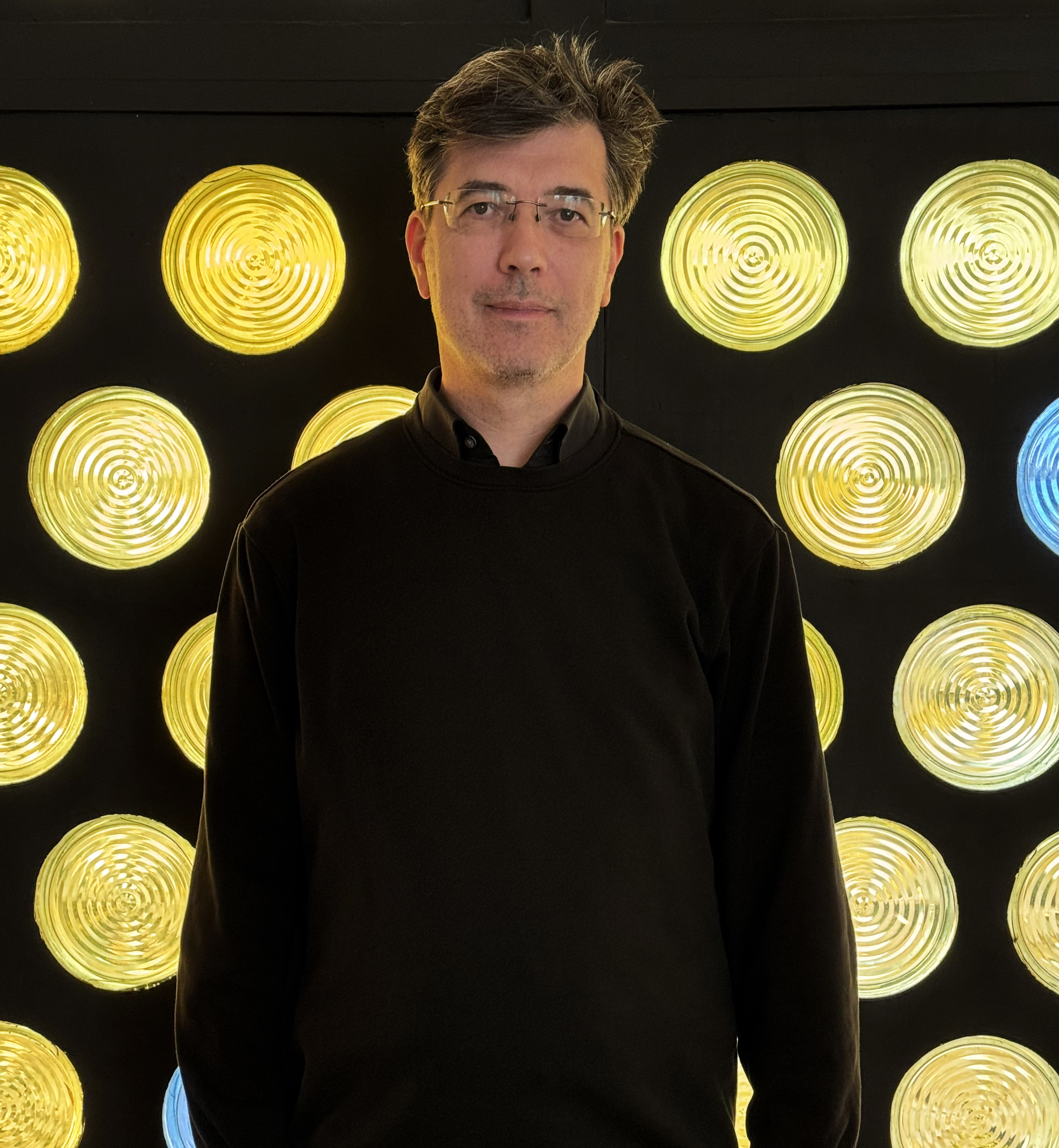
Virgil Widrich (2025)

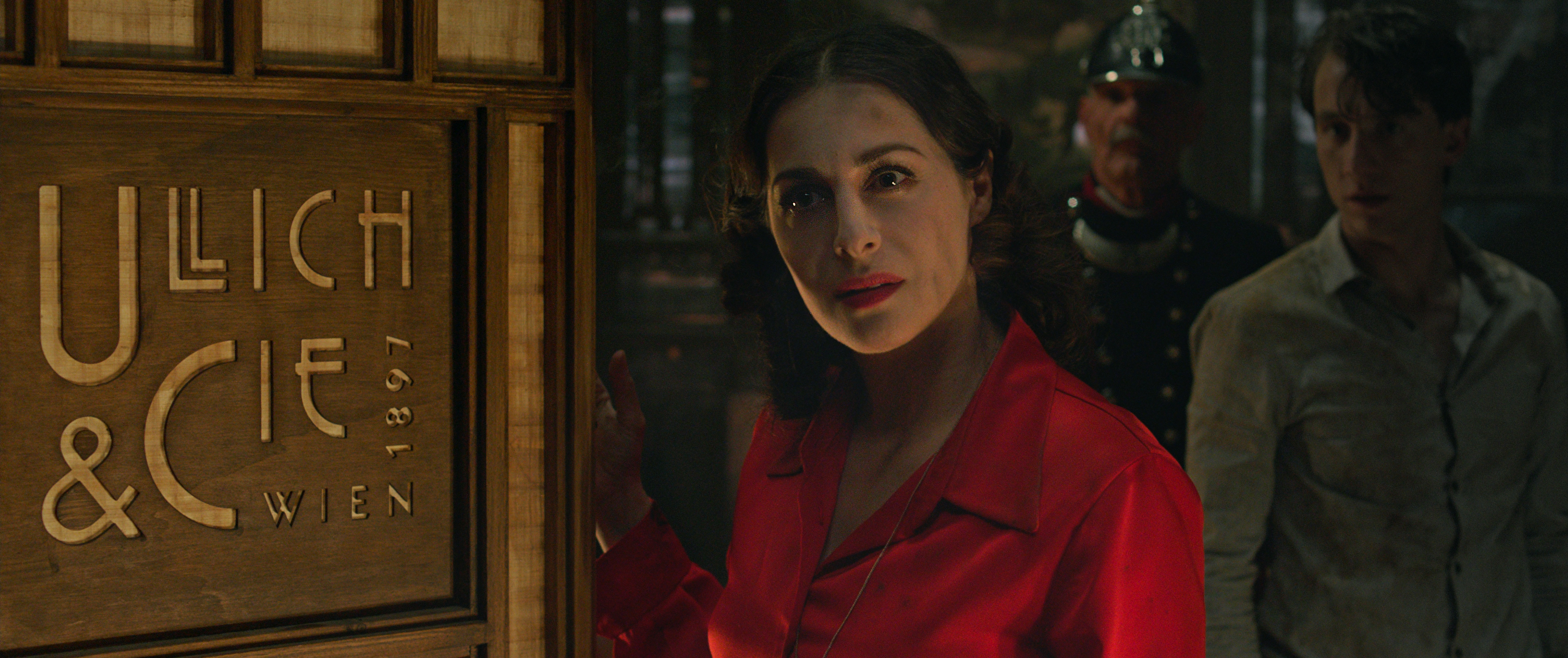
Amira Casar and Laurence Rupp in Night of a 1000 Hours

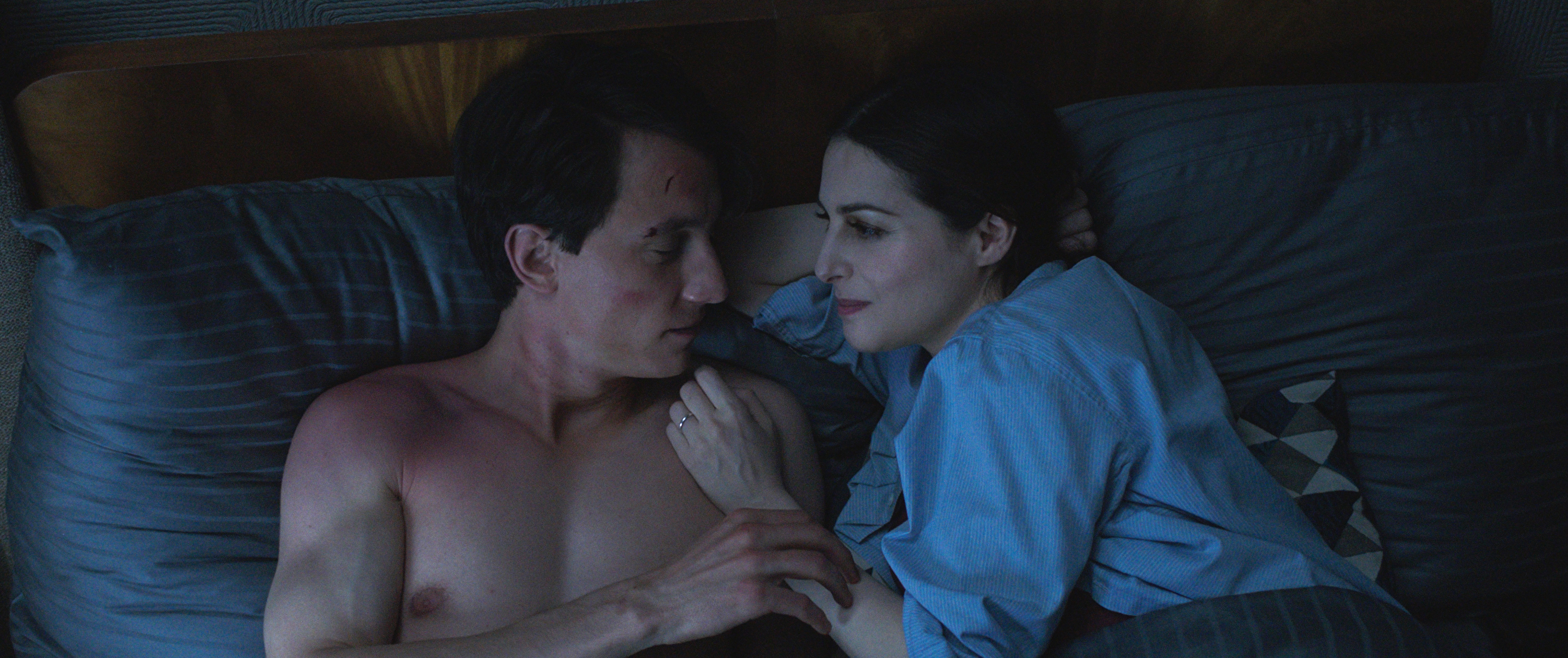
Amira Casar and Laurence Rupp in Night of a 1000 Hours

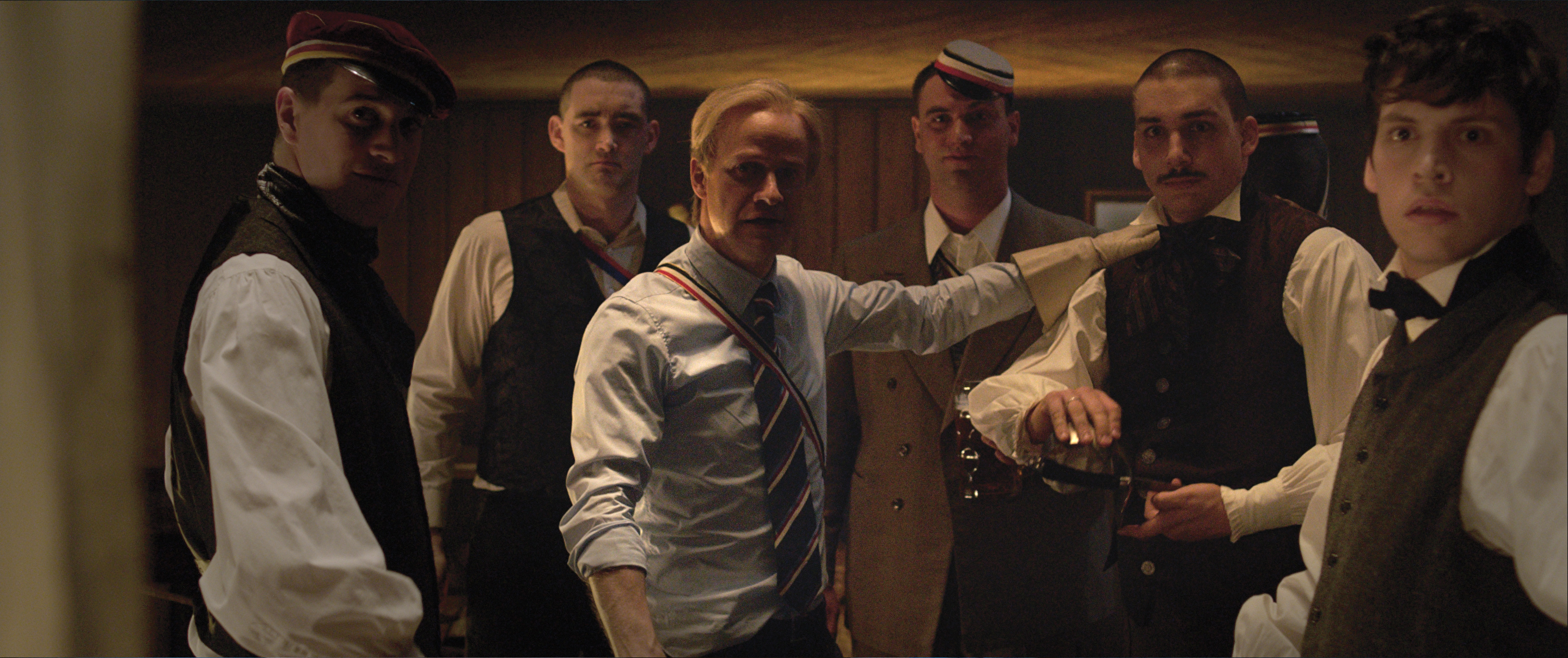
Lukas Miko in Night of a 1000 Hours

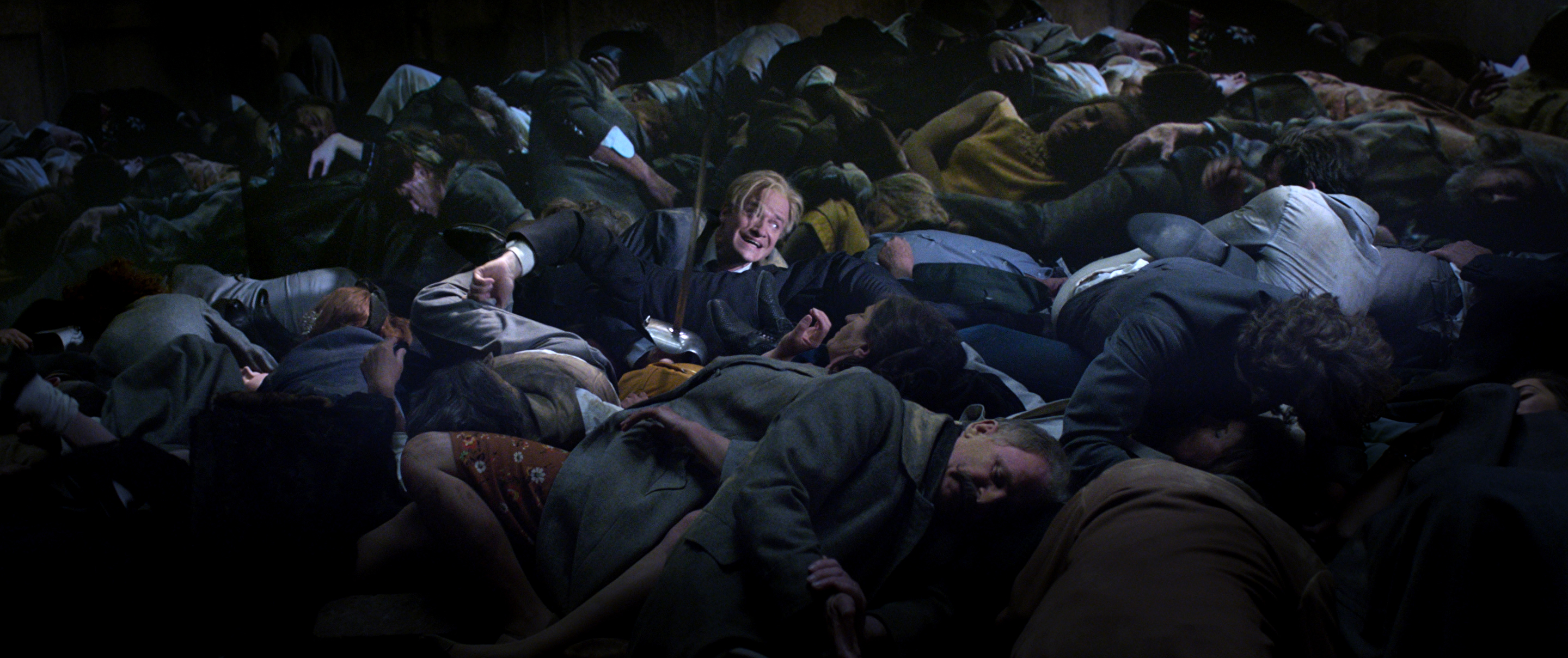
Lukas Miko in Night of a 1000 Hours

Widrich began writing in 2007 under the working title Die Revolution. Development and financing were taken on by Amour Fou in 2008; dramaturgical input came from Jean-Claude Carrière and Luise Gough (2009–2012).

Principal photography took place 15 January–28 May 2015 in Vienna, at Studio Filmland Kehlen (Luxembourg), and at locations in Italy. Christian Berger served as cinematographer; Pia Dumont edited; production design was by Christina Schaffer; costumes by Alette Kraan; the score was composed by Siegfried Friedrich. Widrich devised a hybrid visual approach combining built sets with digitally projected backdrops (a contemporary form of rear-projection) to create shifting spatial illusions. Post-production (sound mix and color) lasted about one year. Delivery was completed on 25 May 2016; international sales and distribution were handled by Picture Tree International.

== Release ==
The film's world premiere was on 10 October 2016 at the Busan International Film Festival in South Korea, where it received the **Flash Forward Audience Award**. Subsequent festival screenings included the Warsaw Film Festival and the Chicago International Film Festival, among many others. The Austrian premiere took place on 15 November 2016 at the Gartenbaukino in Vienna, followed by theatrical release on 18 November 2016. On 23 January 2017 the film opened the 38th Filmfestival Max Ophüls Preis in Saarbrücken. The TV premiere aired on ORF 2 on 28 November 2018.

== Awards ==
- 2016: Flash Forward Audience Award – Busan International Film Festival (South Korea).
- 2017: Nominations at the Austrian Film Award – Best Screenplay (Virgil Widrich), Best Costume Design (Alette Kraan).
- 2018: Nominations at the Lëtzebuerger Filmpräis – Best Co-production, Best Editing (Pia Dumont), Best Production Design (Christina Schaffer).

== Reception ==
English-language coverage highlighted the film's visual concept and time-collapsing family narrative.

- “A living depiction of a family history … moving fluidly between present and past.” — *Austrian Films*.
- Cineuropa described it as “a darkly humorous, visually seductive reflection on Europe’s buried memory.”

Additional profiles appear on Golden Girls Filmproduktion, Letterboxd, and Amour Fou Film’s archive.

== Cast ==
- Laurence Rupp — Philip Ullich
- Amira Casar — Renate Ullich
- Barbara Petritsch — Gertrude Ullich
- Elisabeth Rath — Erika Bode
- Linde Prelog — Berta Ullich
- Johann Adam Oest — Georg Ullich
- Lukas Miko — Jochen Bode
- Luc Feit — Dr. Wisek
- Josiane Peiffer — Marianne Wisek
- Claire Johnston — waitress
- Udo Samel — policeman
