= No Beast. So Fierce. =

2025 film directed by Burhan Qurbani

- Festival release poster
- German: Kein Tier. So Wild.
- Directed by: Burhan Qurbani
- Screenplay by: Enis Maci; Burhan Qurbani
- Produced by: Leif Alexis; Sophie Cocci; Jochen Laube; Fabian Maubach
- Starring: Kenda Hmeidan; Mehdi Nebbou; Verena Altenberger; Camill Jammal; Hiam Abbass; Meriam Abbas; Banafshe Hourmazdi
- Cinematography: Yoshi Heimrath
- Edited by: Philipp Thomas
- Music by: Dascha Dauenhauer
- Production companies: Sommerhaus Filmproduktion; Madants; Getaway Pictures; ZDF; Arte
- Distributed by: Port au Prince Pictures GmbH (Berlin)
- Release dates: February 14, 2025 (Berlinale); May 8, 2025 (Germany)
- Running time: 150 minutes
- Countries: Germany; France; Poland
- Languages: German; Arabic; English

No Beast. So Fierce. (German: Kein Tier. So Wild.) is a 2025 film written, directed by Burhan Qurbani. The film loosely based on William Shakespeare's play The Tragedy of Richard the Third, relocates its action to present-day Berlin, where after a bloody gang war, Rashida, the youngest daughter of the Yorks, rises to become the leader of the Berlin underworld.

A European co-production, the film had its premiere at the 75th Berlin International Film Festival in Berlinale Special section on 14 February 2025. It will be released on 8 May 2025 in the German theaters.

== Synopsis ==
An adaptation of William Shakespeare's play The Tragedy of Richard the Third, the film retells the story shifting the scene to the modern day Berlin.

As the feud between the powerful Arab families, York and Lancaster, shifts from Berlin's streets to the courtroom. Rashida, a lawyer from the House of York, ends the gang conflict with a violent strike against the Lancasters. Despite her efforts, she remains marginalized as a woman in a patriarchal world, denied the title of queen. Determined to claim power, she manipulates, seduces, and destroys her adversaries. However, as she ascends to authority, Rashida faces the trauma of her war-torn childhood. Her rise to power ultimately leaves her ruling over a desolate kingdom, reflecting her inner devastation.

== Cast ==
- Kenda Hmeidan as Rashida York
- Mehdi Nebbou as Imad York
- Verena Altenberger as Elisabet
- Hiam Abbass as Mishal
- Meriam Abbas
- Banafshe Hourmazdi
- Mona Zarreh
- Hoshyari Khan
- Phileas Heyblom as Nael York
- Hayal Kaya as Wicked Sister 3
- Deniz Arora as Ismail Ibn Ibrahim
- Ibrahim Al-Khalil as Ali Lancaster
- Karime Vakilzadeh as Asifa Lancaster
- Giuseppe Barone as Gangster
- Tamer Karabay as Uthman Lancaster
- Levent Aydogdu as Lanchaster Man

== Production ==
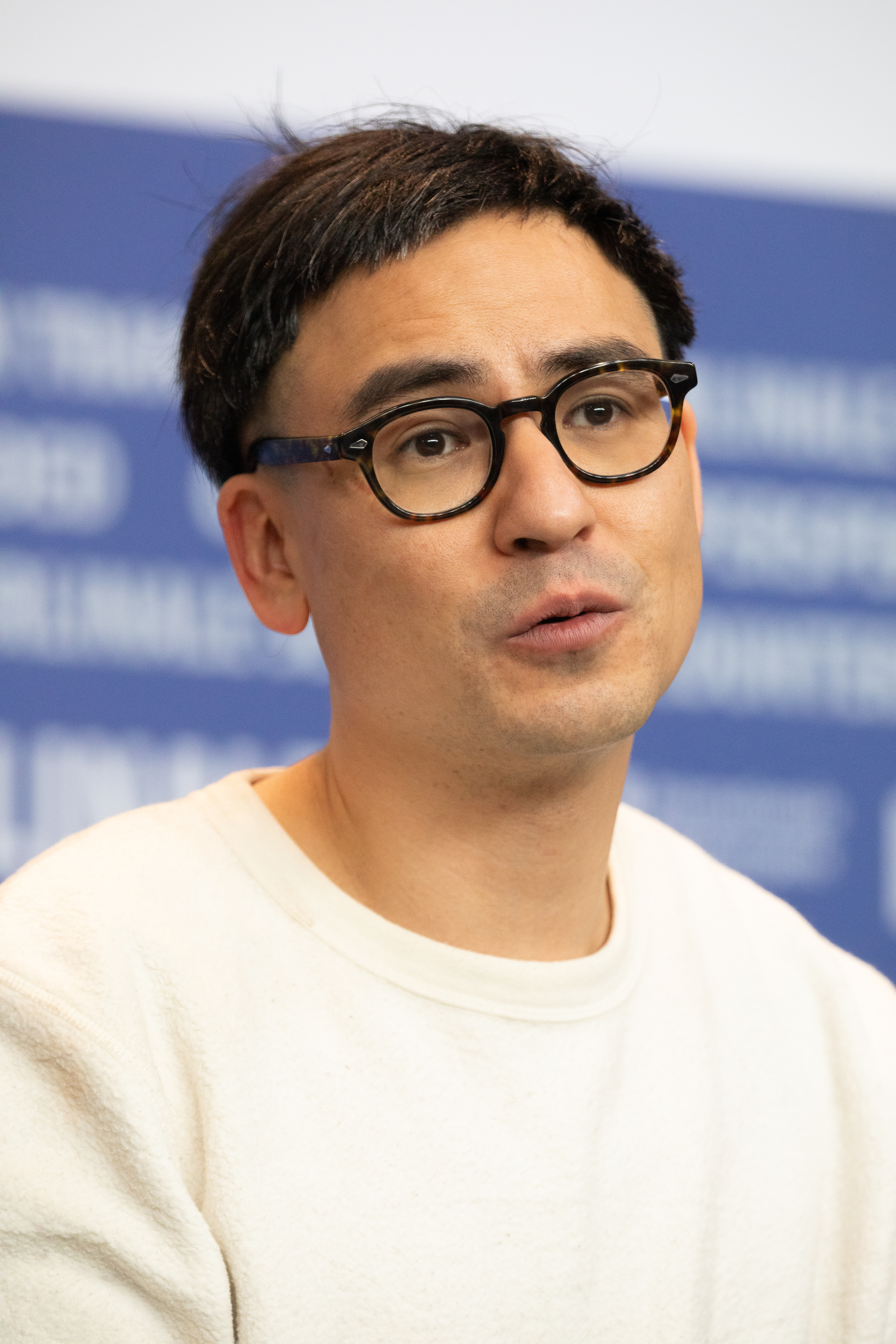
Burhan Qurbani, the director of the film in 2020

No Beast. So Fierce., the fifth film by director Burhan Qurbani is the adaptation of William Shakespeare's play The Tragedy of Richard the Third. He wrote the screenplay with Enis Maci and cast Syrian fled actress Kenda Hmeidan in the lead role of Rashida York. The film produced by the German Sommerhaus Produktion with Getaway Films from France, Madants from Poland and the television stations Arte and ZDF as co-producers.

Principal photography began on 25 July 2023 on locations in Berlin and Warsaw. Filming ended on 14 September 2023 in Berlin.

== Release ==
No Beast. So Fierce. had its world premiere on 14 February 2025, as part of the 75th Berlin International Film Festival, in Berlinale Special. It was also presented in the World Cinema section at the 30th Busan International Film Festival on 21 September 2025, and in the Classical compositions at the CineLibri on November 1, 2025.

It was released theatrically in Germany on 8 May 2025 by Port-au-Prince Pictures.
