= Shahada (film) =

2010 German film

- Film poster
- Directed by: Burhan Qurbani
- Produced by: Robert Gold; Susanne Kusche; Uwe Spiller
- Starring: Carlo Ljubek
- Cinematography: Yoshi Heimrath
- Edited by: Simon Blasi
- Release dates: 17 February 2010 (Berlinale); 30 September 2010 (Germany)
- Country: Germany
- Language: German

Shahada is a 2010 German drama film directed by Burhan Qurbani. It was nominated for the Golden Bear at the 60th Berlin International Film Festival. The film narrates the fates of three German-born Muslims in Berlin that collide as they struggle to find middle ground between faith and modern life in contemporary Western society.

== Cast ==
- Carlo Ljubek as Ismail
- Jeremias Acheampong as Sammi
- Maryam Zaree as Maryam
- Sergej Moya as Daniel
- Marija Škaričić as Leyla
- Vivian Kanner as Ärztin
- Anne Ratte-Polle as Sarah
- Alina Manoukian as Arzu
- Nora Rim Abdel-Maksoud as Renan
- Yolette Thomas as Amira
- Ali Murtaza as Ali
- Vedat Erincin as Vedat
- Julia Graf
- Jacob Jensen as Türsteher
- Jürgen Nafti as Markthallenbesitzer
- Niklas Gerroldt
