= Magda macht das schon! =

- Genre: Comedy
- Created by: Sebastian Andrae
- Starring: Verena Altenberger; Hedi Kriegeskotte; Brigitte Zeh; Matthias Komm; Neil Malik Abdullah; Charlotte Krause; Luis Kain
- Country of origin: Germany
- Original language: German
- No. of seasons: 4
- No. of episodes: 46

Production
- Producer: Polyphon Film-und Fernsehgesellschaft
- Running time: 25 minutes

Original release
- Network: RTL Television
- Release: 5 January 2017 – 11 March 2021

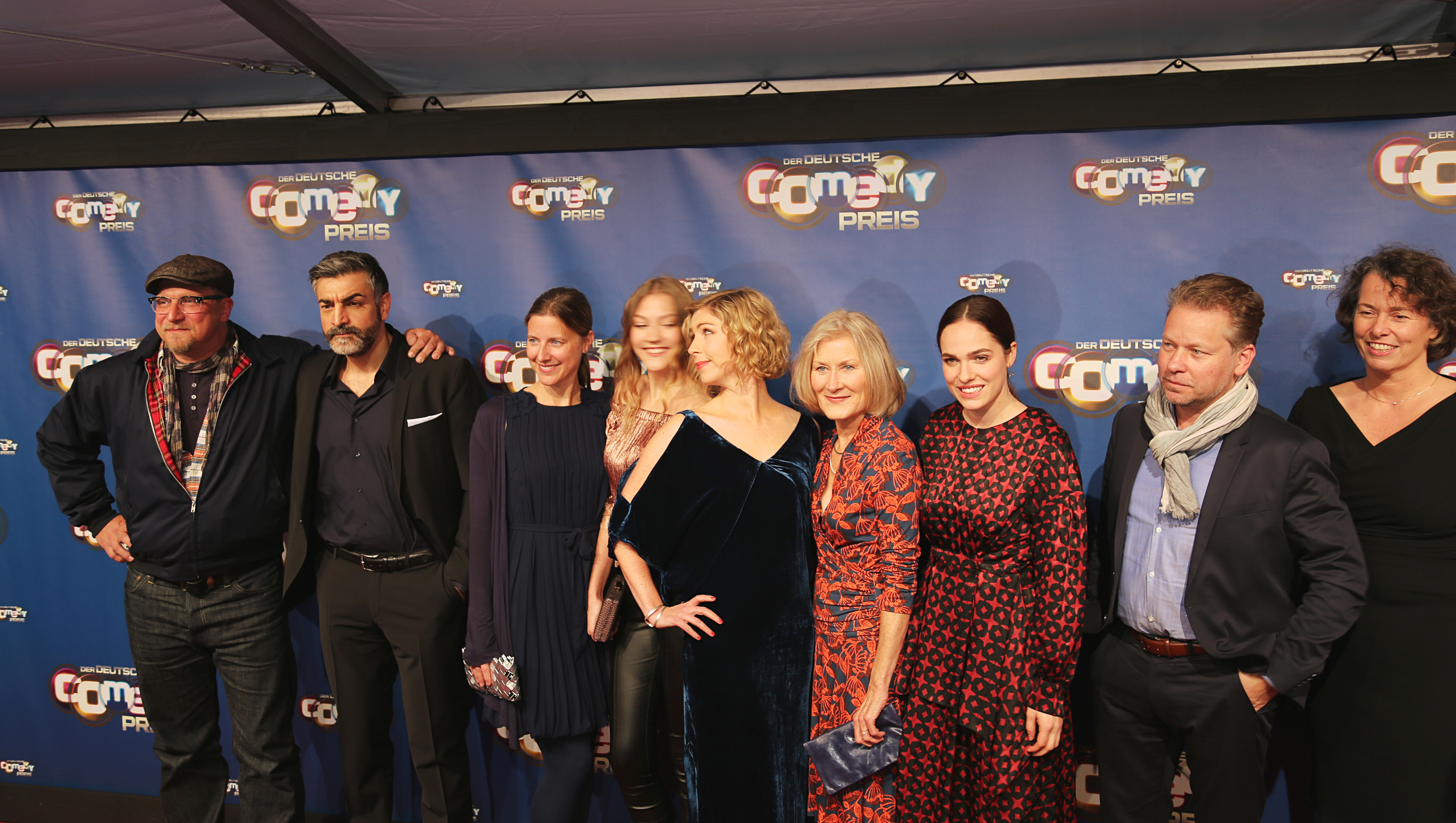
Cast of Magda macht das schon! (2017)

Magda macht das schon! is a German television series that premiered on January 5, 2017, on RTL Television.

== Plot ==
The Polish geriatric nurse Magda, big heart and big mouth urgently needs a new job and a new place to stay. Unquestioningly, she intervenes in a family quarrel at the Holtkamps and offers receptionist Cornelia and elevator technician Tobias as a nurse of Cornelia's mother Waltraud, who has been injured...

== See also ==
- List of German television series
