= Charlotte Krause =

German actress and singer

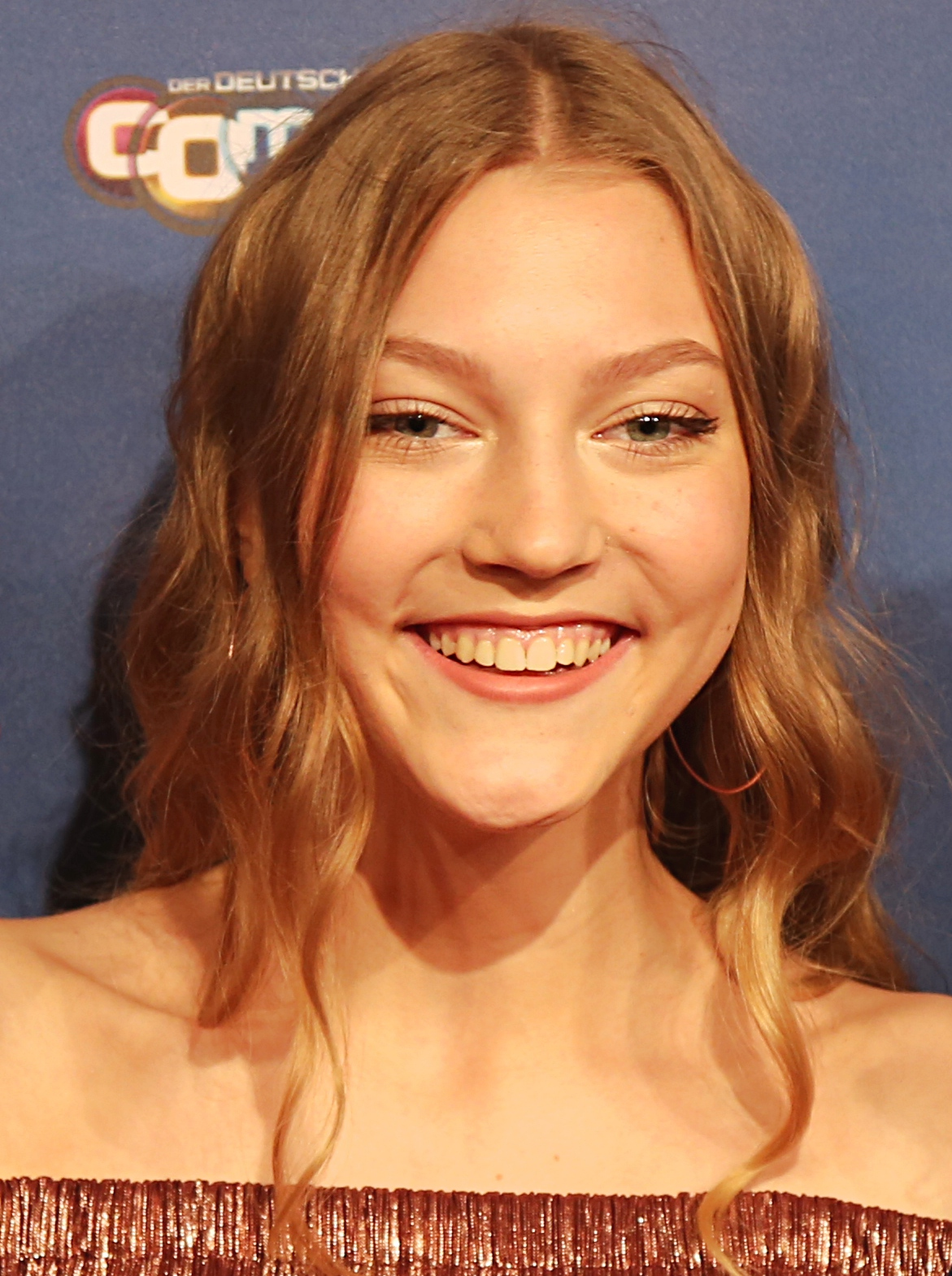
Charlotte Krause at the 2017 German Comedy Awards

Charlotte Laurentine Krause (born 2002 in Berlin) is a German actor and singer.

== Life ==
Charlotte Laurentine Krause has been acting since primary school, and completed classical singing training in 2012. She became known to a wider audience through her lead role as Leah Holtkamp in the German comedy series Magda macht das schon!.

== Filmography ==
- 2017: Das Pubertier (TV Series, Episode Das Pubertier wird tollwütig)
- 2017–2021: Magda macht das schon! (TV Series, 41 Episodes)
- 2018: Die Legende von Lloyd (Short film)
- 2019: Großstadtrevier (TV Series, Episode Freibad)
- 2020: Die Hexenprinzessin (Television film)
- 2020: SOKO Leipzig (TV Series, Episode Der gefesselte König)
- 2021: Blutige Anfänger (TV Series, Episode Lieferstatus: tot)
- 2021: Die Rettung der uns bekannten Welt
- 2022: Almost Fly (Streaming series)
- 2022: WaPo Bodensee (TV Series, Folge Gnadensee)
- 2023: Marie Brand und die falsche Wahrheit (TV Series)
- 2023: Manta Manta – Zwoter Teil (Film)
- 2025: Tatort: Herz der Dunkelheit (TV Series)

== Music ==
In 2023 Krause began to produce music under the name Schlotte. Together with producer Laurin Wagner they developed an independent pop project, of which the song writing, production as well as visual concepts were shared. The collaboration arose out of joint studio sessions and led to a tight duo. The project sits in the genre of German pop music, with introspective and emotionally shaped lyrics on the themes of overwork, coming-of-age and mental health. At the end of 2024 Schlotte published her debut single "Andy Warhol", followed by new singles such as "neue notiz" and "Lieblingsbild". With her first release she has received attention in the German music scene, and performed in the new talent showcase Unreleased Berlin, among others.

== Awards ==
Golden Sparrow 2021

- Best Actress award for Die Hexenprinzessin
