= Lisa Martinek =

German actress (1972–2019)

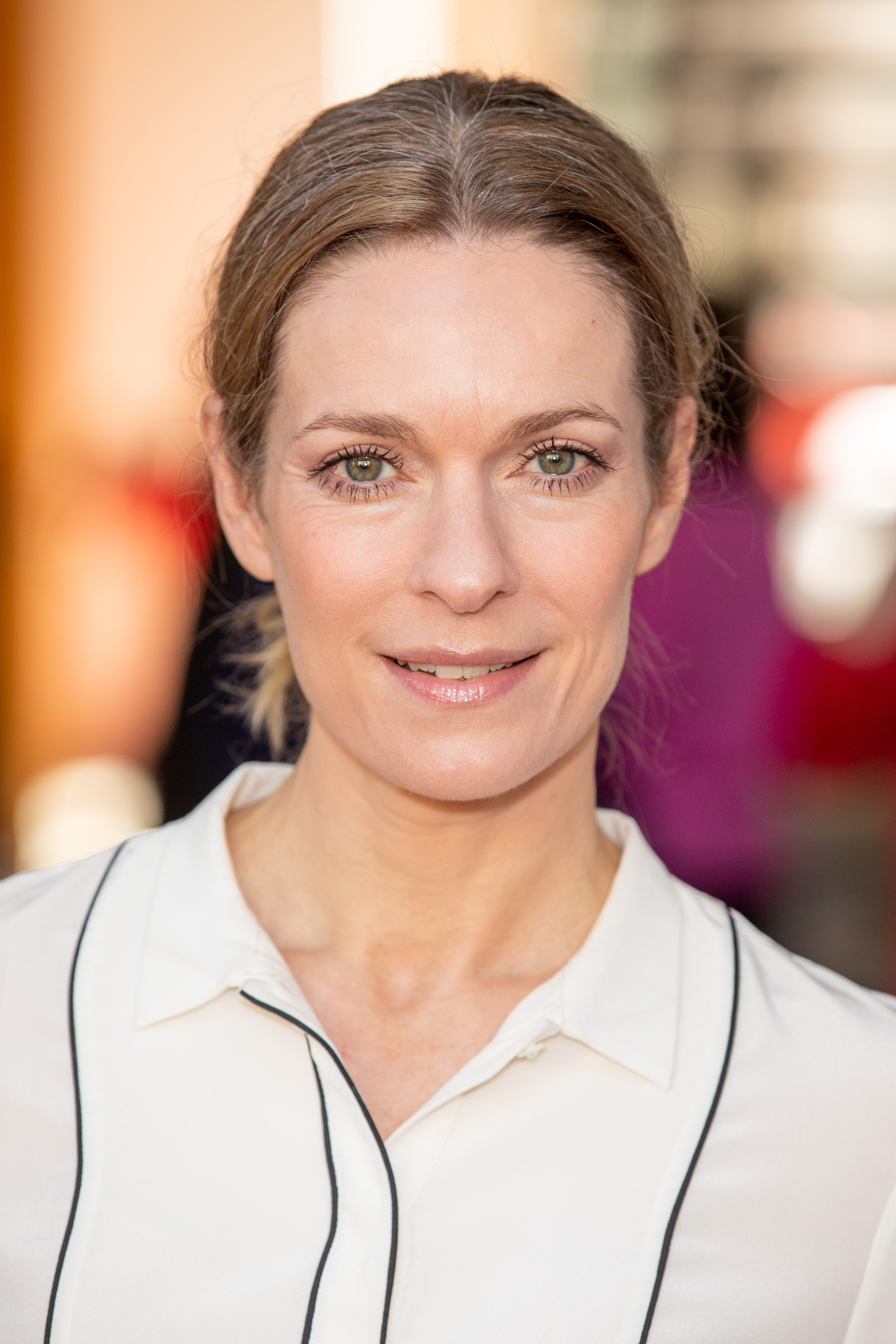
- Martinek at the 2019 Berlinale
- Born: Lisa Wittich; 11 February 1972; Stuttgart, West Germany
- Died: 28 June 2019 (aged 47); Grosseto, Italy
- Occupation: Actress
- Spouses: Krystian Martinek (m. 1992; div. 1995); Giulio Ricciarelli (m. 2009)
- Children: 3

Lisa Martinek (née Wittich; 11 February 1972 – 28 June 2019) was a German actress. She appeared in about 80 film and television productions since 1993, mostly in German television. She died in Grosseto, Italy, after a swimming accident in nearby Marciana Marina.

== Filmography ==
- Trial by Fire (1998), as Lena
- Vom Küssen und vom Fliegen (2000, TV film), as Maria Matuschek
- The Man Next Door (2001, TV film), as Kate Allgöwer-Moor
- Instinct for Crime (2003, TV film), as Susanna Beckert
- Two Days of Hope (2003, TV film), as Angelika
- Room Service (2004, TV film), as Sophie Rheinsberg
- The Next-Door Neighbour Is Alive (2005, TV film), as Kate Allgöwer-Moor
- Rendezvous (2005), as Anna
- F4: Vortex (2006, TV film), as Sophie Berger
- The Zürich Engagement (2007, TV film), as Juliane Thomas
- The Secret of Loch Ness (2008, TV film), as Anna Bender
- Not My Daughter (2010, TV film), as Maria Hofer
- Die Schuld der Erben (2012, TV film), as Clara Billius-Asmussen
- Alles muss raus – Eine Familie rechnet ab (2014, TV film), as Kerstin Faber
