= The Cleaners (2018 film) =

2018 documentary film by Hans Block

- Official Poster of Movie documentary The Cleaners.
- Directed by: Hans Block
- Written by: Hans Block
- Produced by: Christhian Beetz
- Cinematography: Jan Miserre
- Release date: 2018
- Running time: 88 minutes
- Country: Germany
- Language: German

The Cleaners is a 2018 documentary film directed by Hans Block and Moritz Riesewieck. The documentary details the work experience of content moderators who have to decide which content needs to be removed by employing a moderation system for social media websites.

The film won seven awards and was nominated for nine more. The Cleaners shines a light on a corner of the internet that is meant to be hidden from the average user. The film contrasts the poverty of those who work in content moderation and those in the technology profiting off of their labor.

== Content ==
The film presents a mix of documented material featuring expert interviews with Sarah T. Roberts, David Kaye, Tristan Harris, Antonio García Martínez as well as artists including Illma Gore, Khaled Barakeh and Sabo were also interviewed for Cleaners.

Besides that a large amount of interviews with former content moderators from Manila highlights the personal problems they face by having to decided whether to ignore or delete pictures and/ or videos displaying violence, sexual child exploitation, beheadings and suicide.

Recorded content by Nicole Wong, Mark Zuckerberg, senator Lindsey Graham, and the former president Donald Trump, which was not created for this documentary was also included to illustrate their point of view.

The question linking all this material is if the decisions to keep or delete certain content does not distort our understanding of the world. The content moderators hired by Silicon Valley leaders like Facebook and Google do have an influence on what people around the world get to see and thus think.

== Awards ==
=== Wins ===
- DocuDays UA International Documentary Human Rights Film Festival (2019)
- Best Director Documentary, German Directors Guild Award Metropolis (2018)
- International Film Festival and Forum on Human Rights, Geneva (2018)
- It's All True - International Documentary Film Festival (2018)
- Silver George, at the Moscow International Film Festival (2018)
- Prix Europa (2018)
- Audience Award, Grimme-Preis

=== Nominations ===
- Nominated for German Documentary Award, SWR DOKU Festival

=== Festivals ===
- Adelaide Film Festival (2018)
- DocsBarcelona, ES (2018)
- CPH:DOX
- DOK.fest Munich
- Dokufest International Documentary and Short Film Festival, Kosovo (2018)
- German Television Awards (2019)
- HotDocs, Toronto
- Jerusalem Film Festival (2018)
- Reykjavik International Film Festival (2018)
- Santiago International Film Festival - SANFIC (2018)
- Sheffield DocFest
- Sundance Film Festival (2018)
- Thessaloniki Documentary Film Festival (2018)
