= Burhan Qurbani =

German-Afghan film director

- برهان قربانی
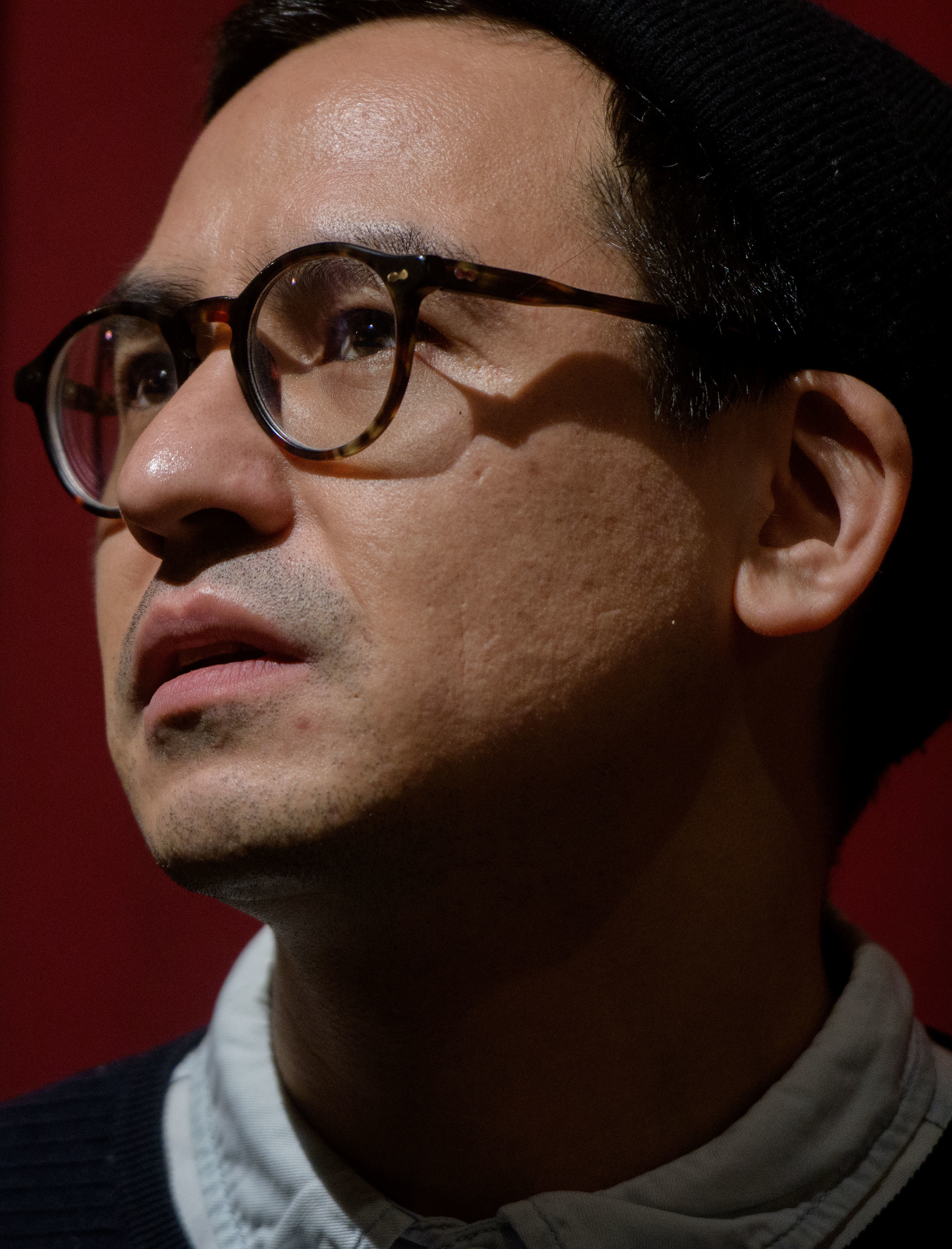
- Burhan Qurbani
- Born: 15 November 1980 (age 45); Erkelenz, West Germany (now Germany)
- Citizenship: German
- Education: Film Academy Baden-Württemberg
- Occupations: Film director, writer, actor
- Years active: 2006 – present
- Known for: Shahada
- Notable work: Shahada (film); Illusion (2007 German short film); 20xBrandenburg

Burhan Qurbani (Dari: برهان قربانی) (born in Erkelenz on 15 November 1980) is a German film director, writer and actor of Afghan origin. His directing, writing, and acting works include Shahada (2010), 20xBrandenburg (2010 TV documentary), and Illusion (2007 short film). His modern day adaption of Alfred Döblin's modern classic novel Berlin Alexanderplatz was selected for the main competition of the 2020 Berlin International Film Festival.

His 2025 film No Beast. So Fierce., which is loosely based on Shakespeare's drama Richard III but focuses on a strong woman in the leading role, had its premiere at the 75th Berlin International Film Festival in Berlinale Special section on 14 February 2025. It will be released on 8 May 2025 in the German theaters.

== Notable works ==
=== Shahada ===
Shahada is a 2010 German drama film which narrates the fates of three German-born Muslims in Berlin whose paths collide as they struggle to find a middle ground between faith and modern life in western society. The film was nominated for the Golden Bear at the 60th Berlin International Film Festival.

=== 20xBrandenburg ===
20xBrandenburg is a 16-minute German TV documentary directed by Qurbani, released in October 2010.

=== We Are Young. We Are Strong ===
We Are Young. We Are Strong (in German, Wir sind jung. Wir sind stark) is a 2014 German drama film directed by Qurbani, a fictionalized account of the 1992 xenophobic Rostock-Lichtenhagen riots. It was one of eight films shortlisted by Germany to be their submission for the Academy Award for Best Foreign Language Film at the 88th Academy Awards, but it lost out to Labyrinth of Lies.

== Awards ==
The awards won by Qurbani include

- Prize of the Guild of German Art House Cinemas for Shahada (2010) film
- Jury Award (Made in Hamburg), including the 2008 German Film Critics Prize for the short film Illusion (2007).

== Personal life ==
Qurbani is from Afghanistan and belongs to the Hazara ethnic group. His family moved to Germany during the Soviet invasion of Afghanistan.
