= Verena Altenberger =

Austrian actress (born 1987)

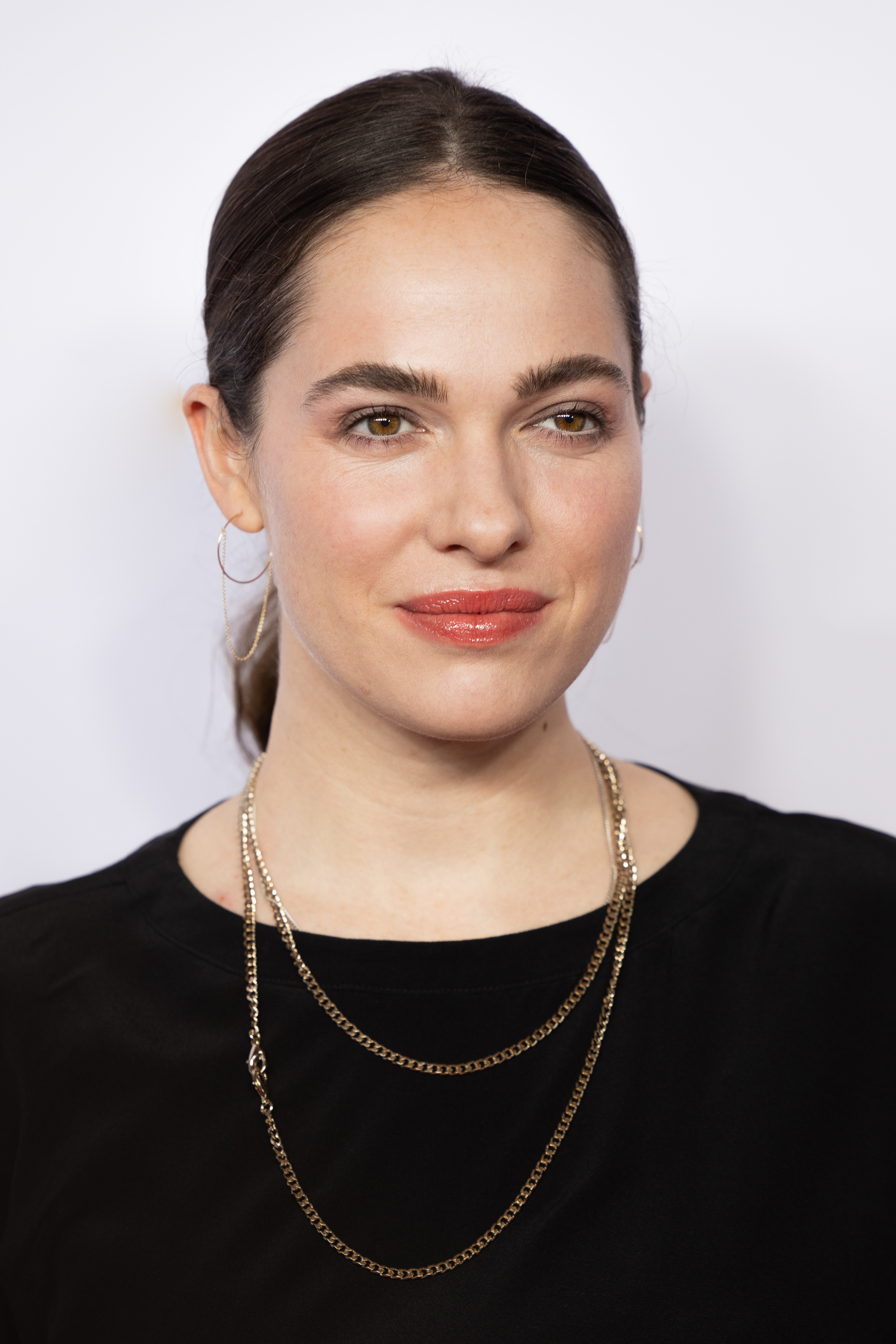
Verena Altenberger (2020)

Verena Altenberger (born November 11, 1987) is an Austrian actress. She is known for having played the lead role in the 2017 film The Best of All Worlds (Die beste aller Welten).

== Early life and education ==
Verena Altenberger was born in 1987, and grew up in the Austrian state of Salzburg in Dorfgastein, Hallein and Oberalm. She spent part of her youth at Schloss Winkl, a former residence of nobility, where her mother was the principal of the Winklhof agricultural school.

Aged 18, Altenberger went to Vienna to study acting, and initially auditioned at the Max Reinhardt Seminar, but was not accepted. As a result, she began to pursue a bachelor's degree in Mass Media and Communication Science at the University of Vienna, from where she graduated.

From September 2011, she studied drama at the Music and Arts University of the City of Vienna, graduating in June 2015.

== Career ==
=== Theatre ===
During the 2010/2011 season, Verena Altenberger was part of the Junge Burg Ensemble at the Vienna Burgtheater, where she performed the title role in Alice in Wonderland (Alice im Wunderland), Blanche Barrow in Bonny and Clyde, and Isolde Weißhand in Tricky Love – Tristan und Isolde, among several other roles. In the 2013/2014 season, she played the role of Lore in Puss in Boots (Der gestiefelte Kater) at the Burgtheater, and in 2015 she appeared on stage at the Vienna Volkstheater in Haben in the role of Rozí.

In Jedermann (Everyman) at the Salzburg Festival of 2021 and of 2022, she took on the role of Paramour (Buhlschaft), alongside German actor Lars Eidinger in the title role.

=== Film and television ===
In the Austrian television series CopStories, Altenberger portrayed the role of Chantal from 2013 to 2018. In Mission: Impossible – Rogue Nation she appeared in a scene as the assistant to the director of the Vienna State Opera. In 2016, Altenberger landed the title role in the German comedy series Magda macht das schon!, in which she plays a Polish geriatric nurse.

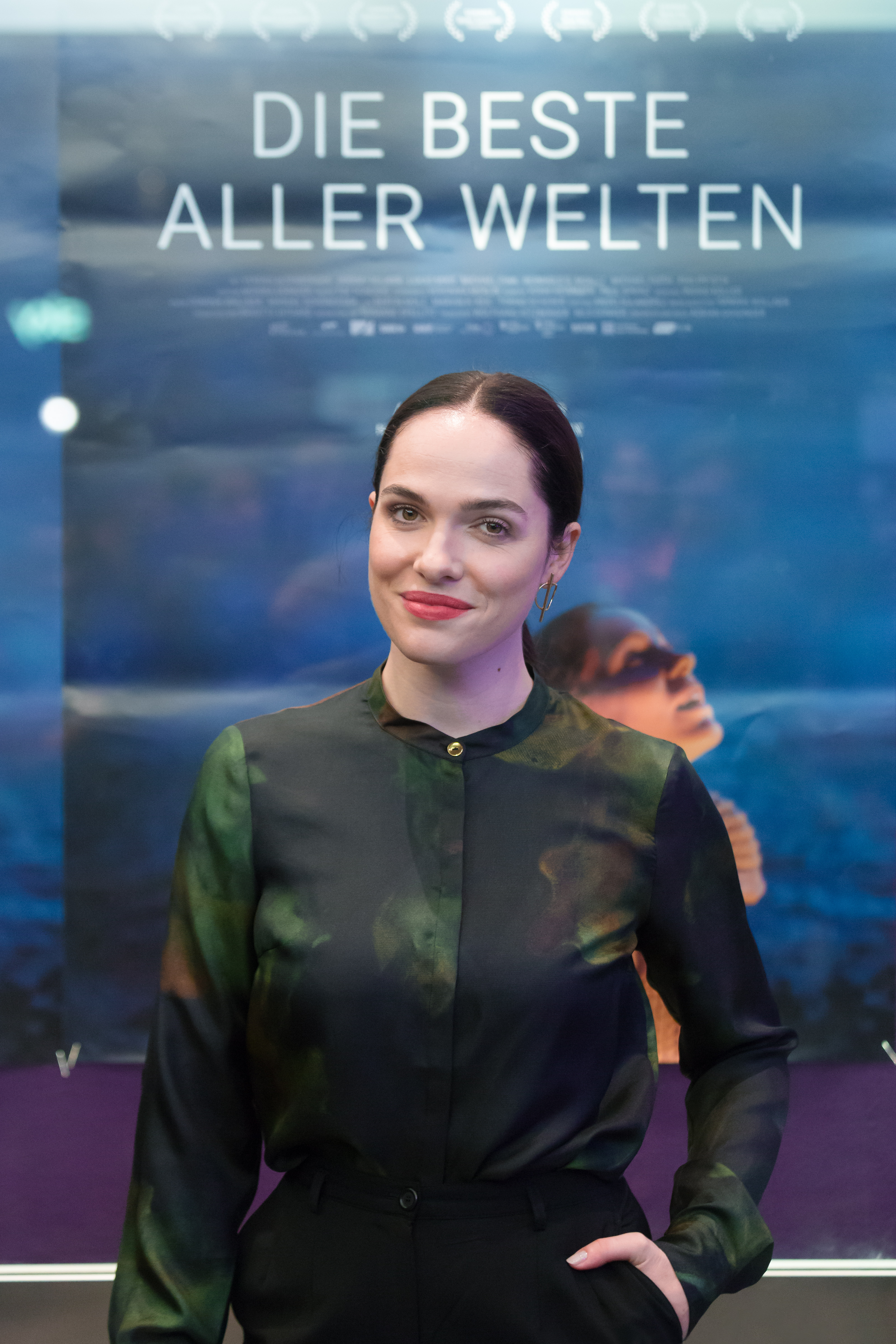
Altenberger at the premiere of The Best of All Worlds in Gartenbaukino, Vienna (2017)

Altenberger played the lead role in The Best of All Worlds (Die beste aller Welten), directed by Adrian Goiginger. She portrays a woman addicted to heroin who tries to overcome her addiction and hide it from her son – portrayed by Jeremy Miliker – whom she loves more than anything and to whom she wants to be the best mother possible. The film premiered at the 2017 Berlinale.

In Climb Every Mountain: Sound of Music Revisited (The Makemakes in Hollywood – Auf den Spuren von The Sound of Music, 2017), Altenberger can be heard as narrator.

In fall 2017, she took part in the ORF/BR/ARTE drama Shillings from Heaven in the role of Rosa Unterguggenberger alongside Austrian actor and film director Karl Markovics, which was directed by Swiss director Urs Egger. At the beginning of 2018, she acted under David Schalko in M – A City Hunts a Murderer (M – Eine Stadt sucht einen Mörder), and in April 2018 she appeared in the historical drama Ein Dorf wehrt sich – Das Geheimnis von Altaussee, a co-production of ZDF, ORF, and Arte.

In 2018, Altenberger succeeded Matthias Brandt in the German crime series Polizeiruf 110 and took on the role of Munich investigator Elisabeth "Bessie" Eyckhoff in the episode "Der Ort, von dem die Wolken kommen". In the third season of the crime series Shades of Guilt ("SCHULD nach Ferdinand von Schirach") she played the role of Sheryl.

In September 2019, she appeared in the documentary Virginia – The Unsolved Riddle of the Salzburg Mafia Bride ("Virginia – Das ungelöste Rätsel der Salzburger Mafiabraut Virginia Hill") about organized crime figure Virginia Hill, alongside Michael Dangl as Hans Hauser for Servus TV, directed by Sascha Köllnreiter and produced by Adrian Goiginger and Peter Wildling. In the Arte television thriller Hunt for the Bosses (Die Spur der Mörder, 2019), Altenberger played Interpol investigator Carla Orlando alongside Heino Ferch as chief investigator Ingo Thiel. In late 2019, she was shooting for the ORF/BR comedy Schönes Schlamassel by Wolfgang Murnberger alongside Maxim Mehmet, in which she portrayed Anne, a non-Jewish bookseller who is very passionate about Judaism.

In 2021, Altenberger collaborated again with director Adrian Goiginger for the production Märzengrund, based on the play of the same name by Felix Mitterer. Simultaneously, she filmed the series Wild Republic for MagentaTV in South Tyrol. and went bald for her portrayal of a cancer patient in Chris Raiber's debut film Unter der Haut der Stadt.

In the tragicomedy Me, We, which premiered at the Graz Diagonale in June 2021, she played the role of Marie, who sets off for Lesbos to provide initial care for refugees arriving at an NGO camp on the coast.

== Other appearances and activities ==
In February 2019, Altenberger was a guest on Claudia Stöckl's program Frühstück bei mir on the Austrian radio station Ö3.

In December 2019, Altenberger was a guest on the satirical late-night talk show Wir sind Kaiser.

In November 2021, Altenberger took over the presidency of the Austrian Film Academy with director and producer Arash T. Riahi, replacing the longtime predecessor duo of Stefan Ruzowitzky and Ursula Strauss.

== Personal life ==
Altenberger lives in Vienna. She speaks German, English, French, Italian, Spanish, Yiddish, and Turkish.

== Awards and nominations ==
- For The Best of All Worlds (Die beste aller Welten):
  - 2017: Compass-Perspektive-Award at the Berlinale
  - 2017: Diagonale – Awarded Best Actress
  - 2017: Internationales Filmfestival Moskau – Awarded Best Actress
  - 2017: Deutscher Regiepreis Metropolis – Awarded Best Actress
  - 2018: Bayerischer Filmpreis 2017 – Awarded Best Actress
  - 2018: Österreichischer Filmpreis 2018 – Awarded Best Actress in a Leading Role
  - 2018: Riverside International Film Festival 2018 – Awarded Best Actress
  - 2018: Harlem International Film Festival 2018 – Awarded Best Actress
  - 2018: Worldfest Houston Independent International Film Festival 2018 – Awarded Best Actress
  - 2018: Milan International Film Festival 2018 – Awarded Best Acting Performance
  - 2018: Hell's Half Mile Film & Music Festival Bay City, Michigan – Awarded Best Lead Actress
  - 2018: Meraki Film Festival 2018 – Awarded Best Actress
  - 2018: Courage Film Festival 2018 – Awarded Best Actress
  - 2018: Romyverleihung 2018 – Nominated in the category Most Popular Actress Cinema/TV-Film
  - 2018: Deutscher Schauspielpreis 2018 – Nominated in the category Best Actress in a Leading Role
- Für Magda macht das schon!
  - 2017: Deutscher Comedypreis – Nominated in the category Best Actress/Best Actor
- Für Shillings from Heaven:
  - 2019: Romyverleihung 2019 – Nominated in the category Most Popular Actress Cinema/TV-Film
- 2019: International Salzburg woman of the year
- 2020: Romyverleihung 2020 – Nominated in the category Most Popular Actress
- 2021: Romyverleihung 2021 – Nominated in the category Most Popular Actress
- 2021: Nestroy-Theaterpreis 2021 – Nominated in the category Most Popular Actress TV-series
- 2022: Jupiter Award – Nominated in the category Best Actress (Cinema, TV, Streaming) (National) for Wild Republic

== Selected filmography ==
- 2012: SOKO Kitzbühel – Casino
- 2012: Die Lottosieger (three Episodes)
- 2012: Schnell ermittelt – Schuld
- 2013: Im Schleudergang – Chakalaka
- 2013: SOKO Wien – Undercover
- 2013: Tom Turbo – Das Gold der Meerjungfrau
- 2013–2018: CopStories (TV series, 17 episodes)
- 2014: Therapie für einen Vampir
- 2014: Hart an der Grenze
- 2014: Universum History – Diplomatische Liebschaften – Die Mätressen des Wiener Kongresses
- 2015: Altes Geld – Lederhaut
- 2016: Tatort: Hundstage
- 2016: Der Hafenpastor und das Blaue vom Himmel
- 2016: Marthe's Secret
- 2016: Erich Kästner and Little Tuesday
- 2016: Landkrimi – Drachenjungfrau
- 2016–2017: Lena Lorenz (TV series, six episodes)
- 2017–2021: Magda macht das schon! (TV series, four seasons)
- 2017: Die Hölle – Inferno
- 2017: The Best of All Worlds
- 2017: SOKO Köln – Die Freundin meiner Frau
- 2017: Hubert und Staller – Der letzte Tango
- 2018: Die Toten vom Bodensee – Die vierte Frau
- 2018: Die Toten von Salzburg – Zeugenmord
- 2018: Defamed
- 2018: Shillings from Heaven
- 2019: M – Eine Stadt sucht einen Mörder (miniseries)
- 2019: Ein Dorf wehrt sich
- 2019: SCHULD nach Ferdinand von Schirach – Der Freund (TV series)
- seit 2019: Polizeiruf 110 als Elisabeth Eyckhoff
  - 2019: Der Ort, von dem die Wolken kommen
  - 2019: Die Lüge, die wir Zukunft nennen
  - 2021: Frau Schrödingers Katze
  - 2021: Bis Mitternacht
  - 2022: Das Licht, das die Toten sehen
- 2019: Die Spur der Mörder
- 2019: Tatort: Baum fällt
- 2020: Love & Mazel Tov
- 2020: Virginia – Das ungelöste Rätsel der Salzburger Mafiabraut
- 2021: Wild Republic (TV series)
- 2021: Me, We
- 2021: Commitment Phobia
- 2021: Hannes
- 2021: Märzengrund
- 2021: Unter der Haut der Stadt
- 2022: Shadows of the Past
- 2022: Riesending – Jede Stunde zählt
- 2023: Ralentir La Chute (Slow down the fall) (Short film)
- 2023: Sterne unter der Stadt
- 2024: Im Rosengarten
- 2024: Bach – Ein Weihnachtswunder
- 2025: No Beast. So Fierce. (Kein Tier. So Wild.)
- 2025: Sturm kommt auf (TV miniseries)
- 2025: Eight
- 2025: Babystar
- 2025: The Life of Wishes
