= The Best of All Worlds =

- Directed by: Adrian Goiginger
- Written by: Adrian Goiginger
- Produced by: Nils Dünkler; Wolfgang Ritzberger
- Starring: Verena Altenberger; Jeremy Miliker
- Cinematography: Yoshi Heimrath
- Edited by: Kathi Durst
- Music by: Michael Kadelbach
- Production company: RitzlFilm
- Distributed by: Filmladen
- Release date: 11 February 2017 (BIFF)
- Running time: 103 minutes
- Country: Austria
- Language: German

The Best of All Worlds (German: Die beste aller Welten) is a 2017 Austrian drama film written and directed by Adrian Goiginger.

== Plot ==
The film is based on Goiginger's childhood and follows a young boy growing up with a loving but heroin‑addicted mother in Salzburg. As he navigates poverty and instability, he clings to imagination and adventure while his mother struggles to overcome addiction.

== Cast ==
- Verena Altenberger as Helga
- Jeremy Miliker as Adrian
- Lukas Miko as Günther

== Release ==
The film premiered on 11 February 2017 at the Berlin International Film Festival in the Perspektive Deutsches Kino section.

== Reception ==
The Best of All Worlds received widespread acclaim in German‑language media.

Der Standard praised the film's empathetic portrayal of addiction and childhood resilience.

Die Presse highlighted the performances of Verena Altenberger and Jeremy Miliker and praised a restless, alert look at the world.

== Awards ==
At the 2017 Berlin International Film Festival, the film won the Kompass‑Perspektive Award in the Perspektive Deutsches Kino section.

The film was also a major winner at the 2018 Austrian Film Awards, earning five prizes.
