= Simpl (Munich) =

Coordinates: 48°09′04″N 11°34′35″E

Simpl is located in Maxvorstadt, Munich, Bavaria, Germany.
