= Labyrinth of Lies =

2014 film

- Theatrical release poster
- Directed by: Giulio Ricciarelli
- Written by: Giulio Ricciarelli; Elisabeth Bartel
- Produced by: Jakob Claussen; Ulrike Putz; Sabine Lamby
- Starring: Alexander Fehling; André Szymanski; Friederike Becht; Johannes Krisch; Hansi Jochmann; Johann von Bülow; Robert Hunger-Bühler; Lukas Miko; Gert Voss
- Cinematography: Martin Langer; Roman Osin
- Production companies: Claussen + Wöbke + Putz Filmproduktion; Naked Eye Filmproduction
- Distributed by: Universal Pictures International
- Release dates: 6 September 2014 (TIFF); 6 November 2014 (Germany)
- Running time: 122 minutes
- Country: Germany
- Language: German

Labyrinth of Lies (German: Im Labyrinth des Schweigens) is a 2014 German drama film directed by Giulio Ricciarelli. Based on true events, it was screened in the Contemporary World Cinema section at the 2014 Toronto International Film Festival. It was selected as the German submission for the Academy Award for Best Foreign Language Film at the 88th Academy Awards, making the December shortlist of nine films, but it was not nominated.

== Plot ==
In 1958, Johann Radmann is a young and idealistic public prosecutor who takes an interest in the case of Charles Schulz, a former Auschwitz extermination camp commander who is now teaching at a school in Frankfurt am Main. Radmann is determined to bring Schulz to justice, but finds his efforts frustrated because of the many former Nazis who are serving in government and looking out for one another.

Radmann's boss, the prosecutor-general Fritz Bauer, puts him in charge of investigating former workers at the Auschwitz camp. The U.S. occupation forces give him access to their files, and he discovers there were 8,000 workers. He goes after Josef Mengele, who lives in Argentina, but flies back to West Germany to visit his family. After the authorities block Radmann's attempt to issue an arrest warrant, his boss warns him off and orders him to concentrate on lower-profile suspects. The department invites Mossad agents to visit, and shares its information with them. As a result, Adolf Eichmann is kidnapped and spirited away to Israel where he is tried, convicted and executed for his crimes. Having pulled off this coup, Israel declines to pursue Mengele.

Meanwhile, Radmann allows himself to be seduced by Marlene, a seamstress who, benefiting from Radmann's connections, starts a business as a dress designer. Radmann reaches a crisis when he discovers his own father was in the Nazi party. When he tells Marlene that her father too was in the party, she ends their relationship. By the end of the film, however, there is a chance she will have him back. He resigns his official post and goes to work for an industrialist. There he is again confronted with the dilemma: do what is right; or do what the system requires you to do?

When he finds this means working with a colleague who had defended a former Nazi he was investigating, Radmann walks out. His idealism has suffered from hard encounters with the real world; at every turn, the "system" wants compliance, but he wants justice. He comes to understand that the only thing that can ease the horror is not justice, but attention to the lives and stories of those who suffered. Growing out of the simplistic right/wrong moralizing, he comes to understand life as more complex, and seeks to repair all the damage, large and small, he inflicted in his zeal.

After going to Auschwitz to say kaddish, the Jewish mourning prayer, for a friend's two daughters who were killed there, he goes back to work for the West German state prosecutor. The film ends with the opening of the trial of several hundred former Auschwitz perpetrators.

== Cast ==
- Alexander Fehling as Johann Radmann
- Johannes Krisch as Simon Kirsch
- Friederike Becht as Marlene
- Hansi Jochmann as Secretary
- Johann von Bülow as Otto Haller
- Gert Voss as Fritz Bauer
- Robert Hunger-Bühler as Walter Friedberg
- André Szymanski as Thomas Gnielka
- Tim Williams as Major Parker

== Reception ==
=== Critical reception ===
On review aggregator website Rotten Tomatoes, the film holds an approval rating of 82%, based on 79 reviews, and an average rating of 6.54/10. The website's critical consensus reads, "Labyrinth of Lies artfully blends fact with well-intentioned fiction to offer a thought-provoking look at how the lessons of history can be easily lost or forgotten." On Metacritic, the film has a weighted average score of 62 out of 100, based on 19 critics, indicating "generally favorable reviews".

=== Accolades ===
At 2014's Les Arcs European Cinema Festival, the film received a Special Mention from the Jury, and won the Prix du Public (audience award).

== See also ==
- The People vs. Fritz Bauer (2015)
- List of submissions to the 88th Academy Awards for Best Foreign Language Film
- List of German submissions for the Academy Award for Best Foreign Language Film
