= Adrian Goiginger =

Austrian filmmaker (born 1991)

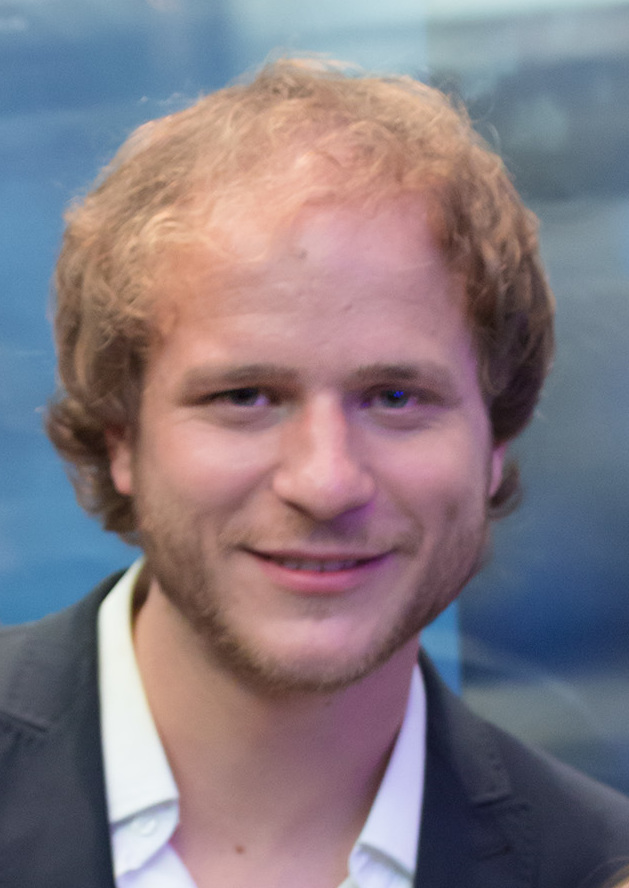
- Goiginger in 2017
- Born: 22 February 1991 (age 35); Salzburg, Austria
- Occupation: film director; screenwriter

Adrian Goiginger (born 22 February 1991) is an Austrian film director and screenwriter.

== Early life ==
Adrian Goiginger was born in Salzburg on 22 February 1991. He grew up with a drug-addicted single mother. His father had died of a heroin overdose. He was close to his grandparents and great-grandparents.

Goiginger wanted to become a filmmaker after he saw Forrest Gump at the age of 11. He went on to study directing at the Film Academy Baden-Württemberg.

== Career ==
Goiginger wrote and directed The Best of All Worlds, an autobiographical film about his childhood and his mother's struggle with drug addiction. The film was released in 2017 and received five Austrian Film Awards, including Best Film, Best Director and Best Screenplay for Goiginger.

Goiginger's 2022 film The Fox is based on an episode from the life of his great-grandfather, who took care of a wounded fox cub as a soldier in the Wehrmacht during World War II.

Goiginger's 2023 film Rickerl is about a failed musician and stars the musician Voodoo Jürgens. It won Goiginger the Austrian Film Awards for Best Director and Best Screenplay.

He again received the Austrian Film Award for Best Director for the 2026 film Four Minus Three. Based on an autobiography by Barbara Pachl-Eberhart, it is about a female clown who loses her husband and children in a car accident.

== Filmography ==
Feature films

- Unforgettable (2010) (school film)
- Hi Fonyód! (2013)
- The Best of All Worlds (Die beste aller Welten) (2017)
- Above the World (Märzengrund) (2022)
- The Fox (Der Fuchs) (2022)
- Rickerl (2023)
- Four Minus Three (2026)
- Das Café ohne Namen (TBA)

Short films

- Aitch (2011)
- Klang der Stille (2014)
- Milliardenmarsch (2016)
- Der Treue größter Akt (2017)
- Franz (2019)
