= Giulio Ricciarelli =

Italian-German actor and film director (born 1965)

Giulio Ricciarelli (born 2 August 1965 in Milan) is an Italian-German actor, director and film producer.

== Career ==
After his training at the Munich Otto-Falckenberg-Schule (1985–1987), Ricciarelli began his career on stage. Thus he was engaged at the Theater Basel in 1989–1990; In 1991, he played at the Staatstheater Stuttgart and at the Theater Oberhausen; In 1992 a two-year engagement took place at Bonn. At the Bavarian State Theater Munich, he played the Alba in Don Carlos in 1994/1995 as well as the leading role Jean in Zazou under the direction of Jérôme Savary. At this time, his first lead role in a television film, the Tonino in Tonino and Toinette by Xaver Schwarzenberger. From 1995 onwards roles in series like Dr. Schwarz and Dr. Martin, Zugriff, and Im Visier der Zielfahnder, in which he played the main commissioner Silvio Kreutzer. In the cinema, Ricciarelli had a smaller role in Rossini among others in 1996.

In 2000, he founded the Naked Eye Film Production in Munich with Sabine Lamby. In addition to working as a producer for films like Stranger Friend (with Antonio Wannek and Mavie Hörbiger, 2003) he also acted as a director. His short film Vincent received a Golden Sparrow in 2005 and was nominated for the European Film Awards in 2006.

In 2014, he took on his debut feature film, a drama called Labyrinth of Lies. The film was nominated in August 2015 as a German candidate for an Oscar nomination in the category Best Foreign Language Film.

Ricciarelli is also present in various roles on television.

== Personal life ==
He lives mainly in Munich. Since 2002, he was associated with the actress Lisa Martinek, whom he married in 2009; she died in 2019 following an incident while swimming in Marciana Marina, Italy.

== Filmography ==
=== As an actor ===
- 1997: Rossini
- 2003: Foreign Friend
- 2006: Robin Pilcher – Beyond the Ocean (TV film)
- 2008: A Holiday Home in Ibiza (TV film)
- 2009: Ceasefire
- 2013: Die Rosenheim-Cops: Who dies twice is really dead (TV series episode)
- 2013: Mein Mann, ein Mörder (TV film)

=== As a director ===
- 2004: Vincent (short film)
- 2008: Love It Like It Is (short film)
- 2009: Lights (short film)
- 2010: Ampelmann (short film)
- 2014: Labyrinth of Lies
