= Virgil Widrich =

Austrian director and scriptwriter (born 1967)

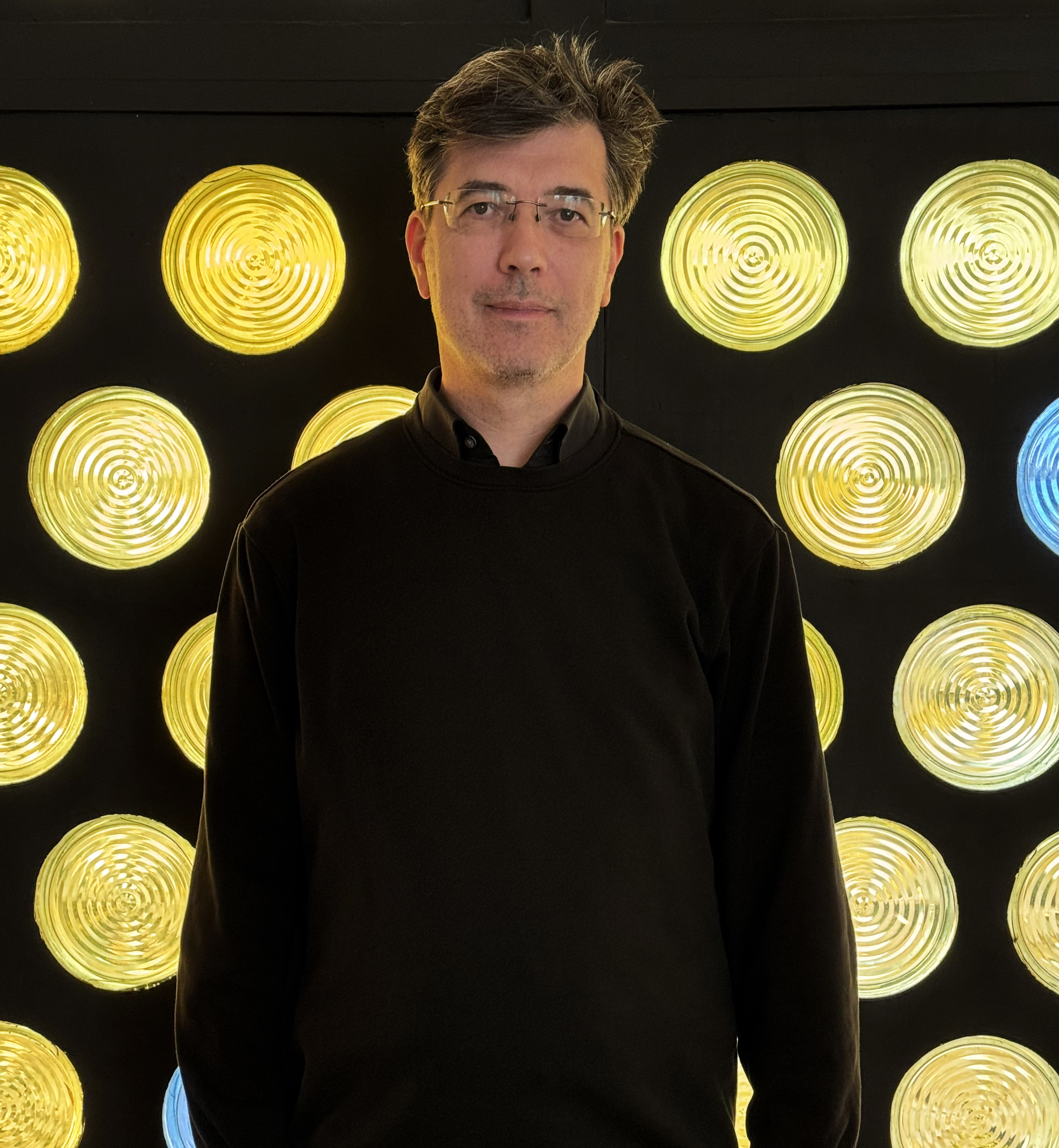
Virgil Widrich (2025)

Virgil Widrich (born 16 May 1967 in Salzburg) is an Austrian director, screenwriter, filmmaker and multimedia artist.

Widrich works on a large number of films and multimedia projects, which have received a total of 290 film awards. He is known especially for his numerous short films and multimedia works.

== Biography ==
Virgil Widrich was born in Salzburg, the son of physician and politician Gerheid Widrich and journalist Hans Widrich, who served for nearly three decades as head of press at the Salzburg Festival.

He grew up in a 500-year-old house on the Mönchsberg, surrounded by artists and filmmakers such as Peter Handke and Wim Wenders, who were frequent visitors. At the age of 13 he received his first Super 8 film camera and began making short films, including My Homelife, Gebratenes Fleisch and 3 mal Ulf (1980). This was followed by Auch Farbe kann träumen (1981) and Monster in Salzburg (1982), his first project involving actors and stop motion animation.

After finishing school at the Akademisches Gymnasium in Salzburg, Widrich briefly attended the Vienna Film Academy before working as assistant to cinematographer and director John Bailey. In 1990 he went to Hollywood to collaborate with Bailey on the science-fiction comedy The Search for Intelligent Life in the Universe. In 1993 he co-organized a new festival for Austrian film, later known as the Diagonale.

From 1997 onwards he concentrated on his own projects again. His short film tx-transform, co-directed with Martin Reinhart, was presented at Ars Electronica. He then wrote and directed his feature film Heller als der Mond ("Brighter than the Moon", 1999), followed by the internationally acclaimed short Copy Shop (2001), which received 43 awards and an Oscar nomination. His next short, Fast Film (2003), was screened at over 500 festivals and received more than 35 international prizes.

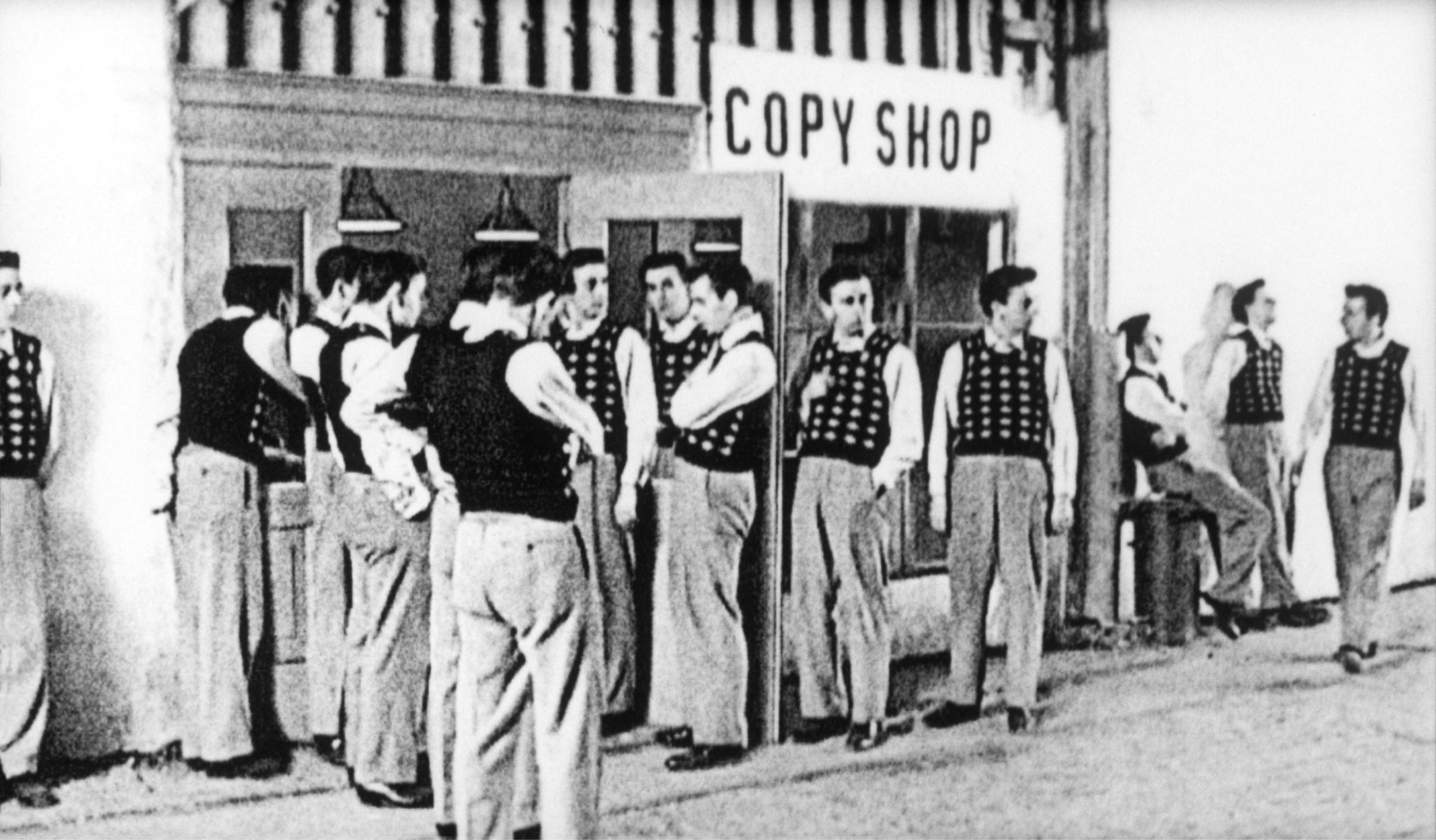
Still from the Academy Award–nominated short film Copy Shop (2001) by Virgil Widrich.

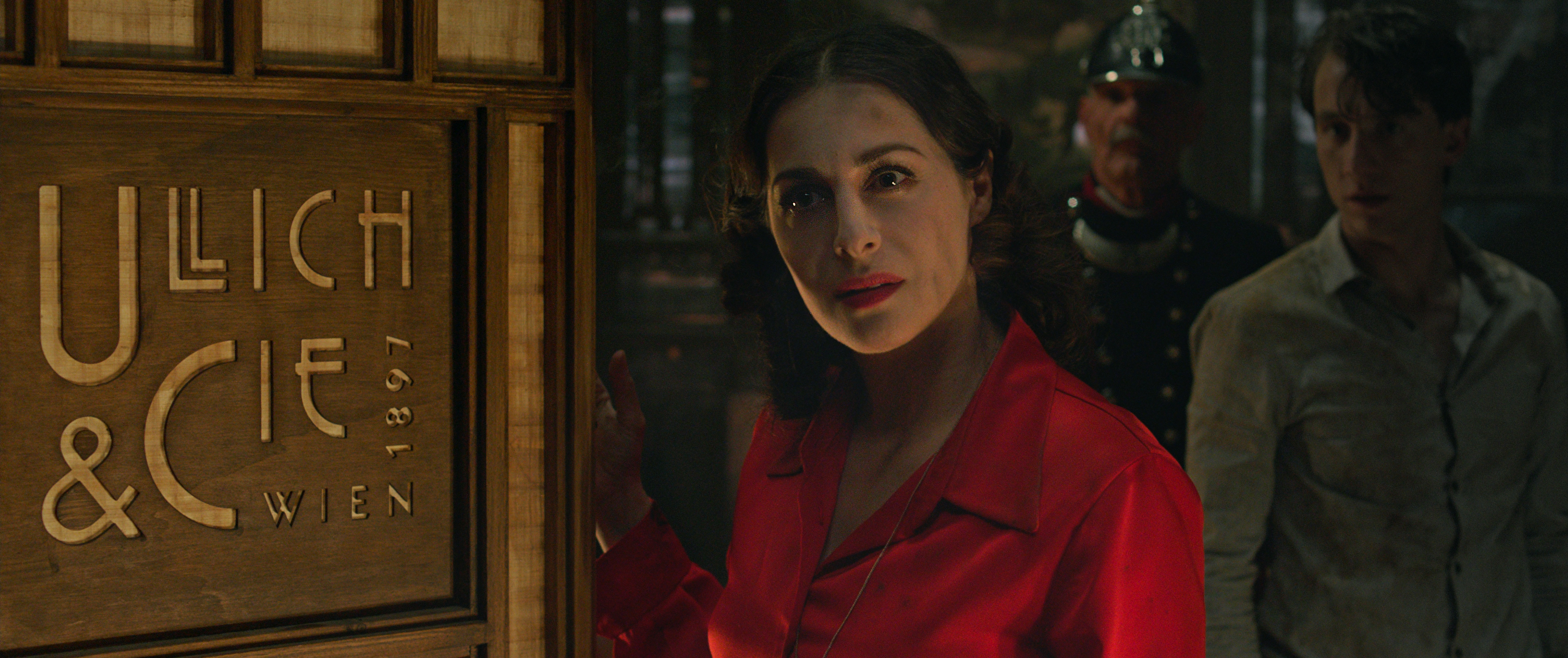
Amira Casar and Laurence Rupp in Night of a 1000 Hours (2016).

In 2001 Widrich founded the multimedia company checkpointmedia GmbH, which develops installations and digital media for museums and cultural institutions. Among his early large-scale projects was the redesign of over 100 interactive media stations for the Technical Museum Vienna (1999). He later co-founded the production company Amour Fou Film (shareholder until 2007) and served as chairman of the Austrian Film Directors’ Association from 2004 to 2007.

Widrich is a member of the Academy of Austrian Film and, since 2024, of the Academy of Motion Picture Arts and Sciences. From 2007 to 2010 he was Professor for Digital Arts at the University of Applied Arts Vienna, where he has led the post-graduate master programme Art & Science since 2010. He is also active in artistic research, directing projects such as Liquid Things (2011–2014), Data Loam (2017–2020) and Radical Matter (2021–2025).

Widrich has three sons with film director Anja Salomonowitz. One of them, Oskar Salomonowitz (2008–2020), known for his role in the film This Movie is a Gift, died in an accident in 2020.

== Exhibitions ==
- 2006: Virgil Widrich created computer-animated installations for the refurbished Mozarthaus Vienna.
- 2008: 13 works by Virgil Widrich and his students of “digital arts” were displayed at the “Essence08” in the Museum für angewandte Kunst Wien.
- 2009: Virgil Widrich took on the role as art director for the exhibition "Linz. City in Luck" at the museum Nordico, that formed part of the city's year as European Capital of Culture.
- 2009: "Alias in Wonderland" took place from 25 June to 12 July in the Freiraum/quartier 21 in the Museumsquartier in Vienna, a project carried out with his students.
- 2009: 10 works by his students of “digital arts” were displayed at the “Essence09” in the Expositur Vordere Zollamtsstraße Vienna.
- 2010: 15 works by his students of “digital arts” were displayed at the “Essence10” in the Vienna Künstlerhaus.
- 2010: Widrich was artistic director of the exhibition “90 Jahre Salzburger Festspiele” (90 years of the Salzburg Festival) at the Salzburg Museum.
- 2011: Artistic director for the exhibition “parameter{world} - parameters for every or no thing” of the master “Art and Science” at the University of Applied Arts Vienna.
- 2012: Works by his students of “Art & Science” were displayed at the “Essence12” in the Vienna Künstlerhaus.
- 2013: "Crucial Experiments": exhibition of University of Applied Arts Vienna on behalf of Vienna Art Week 2013, MuseumsQuartier Wien/Ovalhalle, direction: Bernd Kräftner, Virgil Widrich
- 2014: 2 works by his students of “Art & Science” were displayed at the “Essence14” in the Vienna Künstlerhaus.
- 2015: "Parallaxis" – media installation for the exhibition "A Rush of Color" at Leopold Museum.
- 2016: [dis]placement – Information through Sound - of "Art & Science", Citygate Shopping, 1210 Vienna
- 2017: "Circuit Training", 6 June to 17 June 2017, the white house, 1010 Vienna
- 2017: Exhibition and retrospective "analog_digital - Die Dichotomie des Kinos", 3.10.2017 to 28.1.2018, METRO Kinokulturhaus, 1010 Vienna: film selection retrospective, participation in exhibition with two works
- 2017: Exhibition contribution "Panzerschrank Potemkin" at the Vienna Design Week
- 2017: Co-creation of the exhibition "Aesthetics of change – 150 years of the University of Applied Arts Vienna" at the MAK, Vienna
- 2018: Co-creation of "Sound of Music World", Salzburg
- 2018: Exhibition contribution "Voyage around my room" at the Vienna Design Week
- 2019: Sconarium visitor centre in Bad Schönau: artistic direction of the exhibition
- 2020: "Music Everywhere!", DomQuartier Salzburg: artistic direction
- 2025: "Klimt. Pigment & Pixel – Rediscovering Art Through Technology", Lower Belvedere: exhibition design in collaboration with Marc Schuran
- 2025: "IN-SIGHT: Gustav Klimt – The Bride", Upper Belvedere: exhibition design in collaboration with Marc Schuran

== Stage works ==
- 2012: Concept (in collaboration with Martin Haselböck and Frank Hoffmann), stage, visuals and film projections for "New Angels", which premiered on November 19, 2012 at the Théâtre National du Luxembourg.
- 2019: Set and film direction for Franz Danksagmüller’s chamber opera Nova – Imperfecting Perfection at the German Protestant Kirchentag 2019 in Dortmund.

== Research ==
In addition to his work in film and multimedia, Widrich is also active in artistic research.

His main research projects include:

- Liquid Things (2011–2014): a research project exploring active materials and metamorphic matter. Project leader: Roman Kirschner; artistic research: Yunchul Kim; organizational lead: Virgil Widrich. Funded by the Austrian Science Fund (FWF) within the PEEK program at the University of Applied Arts Vienna.
- Data Loam (2017–2020): an interdisciplinary research project on the visual structuring and poetic reordering of knowledge. Directed by Virgil Widrich; participating researchers: Martin Reinhart, Leo Coster, Matthias Strohmaier, Marc Orou, Johnny Golding, and Mattia Paganelli. Supported by the University of Applied Arts Vienna and the Austrian Science Fund (FWF).
- Radical Matter (2021–2025): a PEEK-funded research project investigating quantum-like material phenomena from artistic and theoretical perspectives. Directed by Virgil Widrich; contributors include Martin Reinhart, Erich Prem, Gerald Nestler, Johnny Golding, and Manu Luksch. Conducted at the University of Applied Arts Vienna and funded by the FWF.

== Publications ==
- Alias in Wonderland. Exhibition catalogue, 25 June – 12 July 2009, Freiraum/quartier21, Vienna; works by students of the Department of Digital Art. Authors: Bernhard Faiss, Institute of Fine and Media Arts (Vienna); editor: Virgil Widrich. Vienna: University of Applied Arts, 2009, ISBN 978-3-85211-152-0.
- Inszenierung und neue Medien / Presentation and New Media: 10 Jahre checkpointmedia – Konzepte, Wege, Visionen / 10 Years checkpointmedia: Concepts, Paths, Visions. Editors: Virgil Widrich, Stefan Reiter, Stefan Unger. Vienna: Springer Vienna, 2011, ISBN 978-3-7091-0980-9.
- Edition Angewandte: An Envelope for Arts, Sciences, Politics and Us. Editors: Valerie Deifel, Bernd Kräftner, Virgil Widrich. Vienna: Springer Vienna, 2012, ISBN 978-3-7091-0989-2.
- Bei den Fischottern in der Ebene und auf den Bergen. By Hans Widrich; editor: Virgil Widrich. Salzburg: self-published, 2016.
- The Future of Museums. Edited by Gerald Bast, Elias G. Carayannis and David F. J. Campbell. Contribution by Virgil Widrich: “Transforming Education and Labor in a Museum as a Model of the Future: Vacancies in the Future Museum.” Springer International Publishing, 2019, ISBN 978-3-319-93954-4.
- Expanded Animation – Mapping an Unlimited Landscape. Contribution by Virgil Widrich: “Images between Digital Realism and Analog Believability.” Springer International Publishing, 2020, ISBN 978-3-030-22352-3.

== Filmography ==
- 1980: My Homelife (A) – 6 min
- 1980: Gebratenes Fleisch (A) – 11 min
- 1980: 3 mal Ulf (A) – 12 min
- 1981: Auch Farbe kann träumen (A) – 12 min
- 1982: Monster in Salzburg (A) – 12 min
- 1983–1985: Vom Geist der Zeit (A) – 112 min
- 1998: tx-transform (A) – 5 min, co-directed with Martin Reinhart
- 2000: Heller als der Mond (Brighter than the Moon) (Europe) – 88 min
- 2001: Copy Shop (A) – 12 min
- 2001: LinksRechts (A/F) – 4 min
- 2003: Fast Film (A/LUX) – 14 min
- 2010: make/real (A) – 5 min
- 2011: warning triangle (A) – 6 min
- 2015: back track (A) – 7 min
- 2016: Vienna table trip (A) – 1 min 22 s
- 2016: Night of a 1000 Hours (LUX/A/NL) – feature film
- 2018: Icon Island – a live battle of pictures and sounds (A) – 70 min
- 2018: Nena & Dave Stewart: Be my Rebel (D) – 3 min 45 s, music video
- 2018: Light Matter (A) – 5 min, experimental
- 2019: tx-reverse (A/D) – 5 min, co-directed with Martin Reinhart
- 2021: There is exactly enough time (A) – 1 min, with Oskar Salomonowitz

Since 2011: project development for a feature-length animated film titled "Micromeo", screenplay in collaboration with Jean-Claude Carrière.

== Accolades ==
In total, Virgil Widrich's work has received more than 290 international awards.

for Heller als der Mond (Brighter than the Moon) (2000):

- Scriptwriting Prize of the City of Salzburg (1997)
- Jean Carment Award – Angers European First Film Festival (2000)
- Laser Vidéo Titres Award – Angers European First Film Festival (2000)

for Copy Shop (2001):

- Academy Award for Best Live Action Short nomination
- Prix de la meilleure création sonore — Festival du Court-Métrage de Clermont-Ferrand (2001)
- Best Experimental Short — Toronto International Short Film Festival (2001)
- Kodak Award — Jury's Choice — Puchon International Fantastic Film Festival (2001)
- Jury Prize — IMAGO 2001, Covilha, Portugal (2001)
- Silberne Taube — 44th Leipzig International Film Festival (2001)
- Best Short film — Lleida 2001 – inCurt
- Best Experimental — Shorts International Film Festival New York (2001)
- Comunidad de Madrid Award — Semana de Cine Experimental (2001)
- Jury Prize — Leuven Kort 2001 – International Short Film Festival
- Best of Festival — Boston Underground Film Festival (2002)
- Prix des télévisions européennes — Brussels Festival of Fantasy, Thriller and Science Fiction (2002)
- Special Prize — Hiroshima International Animation Festival (2002)
- Best Experimental Film — Thessaloniki Panorama of Independent Film and Video Makers (2002)
- Jury's Special Prize — Tehran International Animation Festival (2003)
- Best Experimental Film – Reale Film Festival, Milan, Italy (2022)
- Best Back to the Future – Absurd Film Festival, Milan, Italy (2022)

for Fast Film (2003):

- Official selection Festival de Cannes (2003)
- Best Animated Short (C.O.R.E. Digital Pictures Award) – Toronto (2003)
- Grand Prix for Animation – Vila do Conde Short Film Festival, Portugal (2003)
- Best Experimental Short Film – 52nd Melbourne International Film Festival (2003)
- Audience Award – Bearded Child Film Festival, USA (2003)
- Most Imaginative Film – Odense Film Festival (2003)
- High Risk Award – Fantoche Festival, Zürich (2003)
- Best Experimental Film – Thessaloniki Panorama (2003)
- Most Innovative Short – Leipzig International Festival (2003)
- Grand Prix – Uppsala International Short Film Festival (2003)
- Premio de la Comunidad de Madrid – Semana de Cine Experimental (2003)
- Onda Curta, 2nd Prize and Jury Mention – Cinanima, Portugal (2003)
- Innova Award – Animadrid, Spain (2003)
- Film Critics Award – Animafest Zagreb (2004)
- ASIFA Korea Prize – SICAF (2004)
- Cartoon d'Or – Best Animated Film, Cartoon Forum Galicia (2004)
- Part of the Animation Show of Shows

for Nena & Dave Stewart: Be my Rebel (2018):

- Multiple international festival awards, including Mindfield Film Festival (Los Angeles), Snowdance Film Awards, and LA Edge Film Awards (2018).

for tx-reverse (2019):

- Best Experimental Short Film – Eden International Film Festival (2022)
- Best Experimental Short Film – Black Mountain Film Festival (2022)
- Best Experimental Short Film – Edison International Film Festival, Chennai (2022)

for There is exactly enough time (2021):

- Best Animation – Harlem International Film Festival, New York (2023)
- Best Drama – Panther City Film Festival, USA (2023)
- Best Editing – Monza Film Fest, Italy (2023)
- Honorable Mention – British Indie Festival, London (2023)
- Award Winner – Blow-Up Arthouse Filmfest, Chicago (2024)

for checkpointmedia:

- National Award for the “Mozarthouse Vienna” in the category "Culture and Entertainment" (2006)
- Award for "Visitor Center of the Austrian Parliament" in the category "Public Information and Services" (2006)
