= Sleeping with a Tiger =

2024 Austrian biographical film

- Theatrical release poster
- German: Mit einem Tiger schlafen
- Directed by: Anja Salomonowitz
- Written by: Anja Salomonowitz
- Produced by: Antonin Svoboda (film director)
- Starring: Birgit Minichmayr
- Cinematography: Jo Molitoris
- Edited by: Joana Scrinzi
- Music by: Bernhard Fleischmann
- Production company: coop99
- Distributed by: Stadtkino Filmverleih [at]
- Release dates: 17 February 2024 (Berlinale); 12 April 2024 (Austria)
- Running time: 107 minutes
- Country: Austria
- Language: German

Sleeping with a Tiger (German: Mit einem Tiger schlafen) is a 2024 Austrian biographical film directed by Anja Salomonowitz. The film starring Birgit Minichmayr tells the story about the artist Maria Lassnig.

It was selected in the Forum section at the 74th Berlin International Film Festival, where it had its world premiere on 17 February 2024. It was released theatrically on 12 April 2024 in Austria.

== Synopsis ==
Sleeping with a Tiger is a hybrid of genres about the Austrian painter Maria Lassnig. It depicts her struggle in the male-dominated art world, her struggle for her art, her quest for her very personal artistic expression in which she expressed her pain on the canvas. And then also a film about her great artistic achievement.

The film is a biopic with a different style. The painter is always portrayed by the same actress: no matter what age Maria Lassnig is shown in the film - whether 6, 14, 64 or 94 years old - the same person plays her, without any make-up to alter her age, so she always looks the same. She travels through time as a timeless figure. This is an artistic interpretation of her mental state. It is said that Maria Lassnig was ageless, wise as a young girl and youthful as an old woman. This means that this film is not really a biopic: it is a poetic approach to the fact that our soul never changes.

== Cast ==
- Birgit Minichmayr as Maria Lassnig
- Johanna Orsini as Mathilde Lassnig
- Lukas Watzl as Hans Werner Poschauko
- Oskar Haag as Arnulf Rainer
- Maria Nicolini as Maria Lassnig's grandmother
- Johannes Silberschneider as Wilhelm Dachauer
- Saladin Dellers as Hans Ulrich Obrist
- Carl Achleitner as Priest
- Grischka Voss as Expert
- Max Ortner as Curator
- Laura Bleimund as Andrea Teschke
- Raphael Nicholas as Art Expert
- Adrian Moskowicz as gallery owner
- Christine Buchmann as NY Gallery Assistant
- Dominik Raneburger as Father
- Justine Parsons as Journalist

== Production ==
The film produced by the Austrian coop99 with Antonin Svoboda as producer, has the Stadtkino Filmverleih as the distributor for Austria. The production was supported by the Austrian Film Institute, the Vienna Film Fund, Film Location Austria (FISA), the state of Lower Austria and the state of Carinthia. Austrian Broadcasting Corporation are television participants for the film, which is directed and written by Anja Salomonowitz, with Jo Molitoris as the director of photography and Joana Scrinzi as the editor.

Filming took place over 28 days from 17 March 2022 in Vienna, Carinthia and Lower Austria. Film was also shot in the coat of arms hall of the Landhaus Klagenfurt, where Lassnig's exhibition from 1947 was recreated, and in Feistritz ob Grades, where the painter died in 2014. The filming ended on 3 May 2022.

== Release ==
Sleeping with a Tiger premiered globally on February 17, 2024, as part of the 74th Berlin International Film Festival in the Forum section.

The film was released theatrically in Austria on April 12, 2024, by Stadtkino Filmverleih.

== Reception ==
Susanne Gottlieb reviewing the film at Berlinale for Cineuropa wrote, "Delving into the life of Austrian painter Maria Lassnig with a non-linear approach, Anja Salomonowitz breaks with the traditional biopic while also keeping her subject an enigma."
