= Elahe Esmaili =

Iranian filmmaker

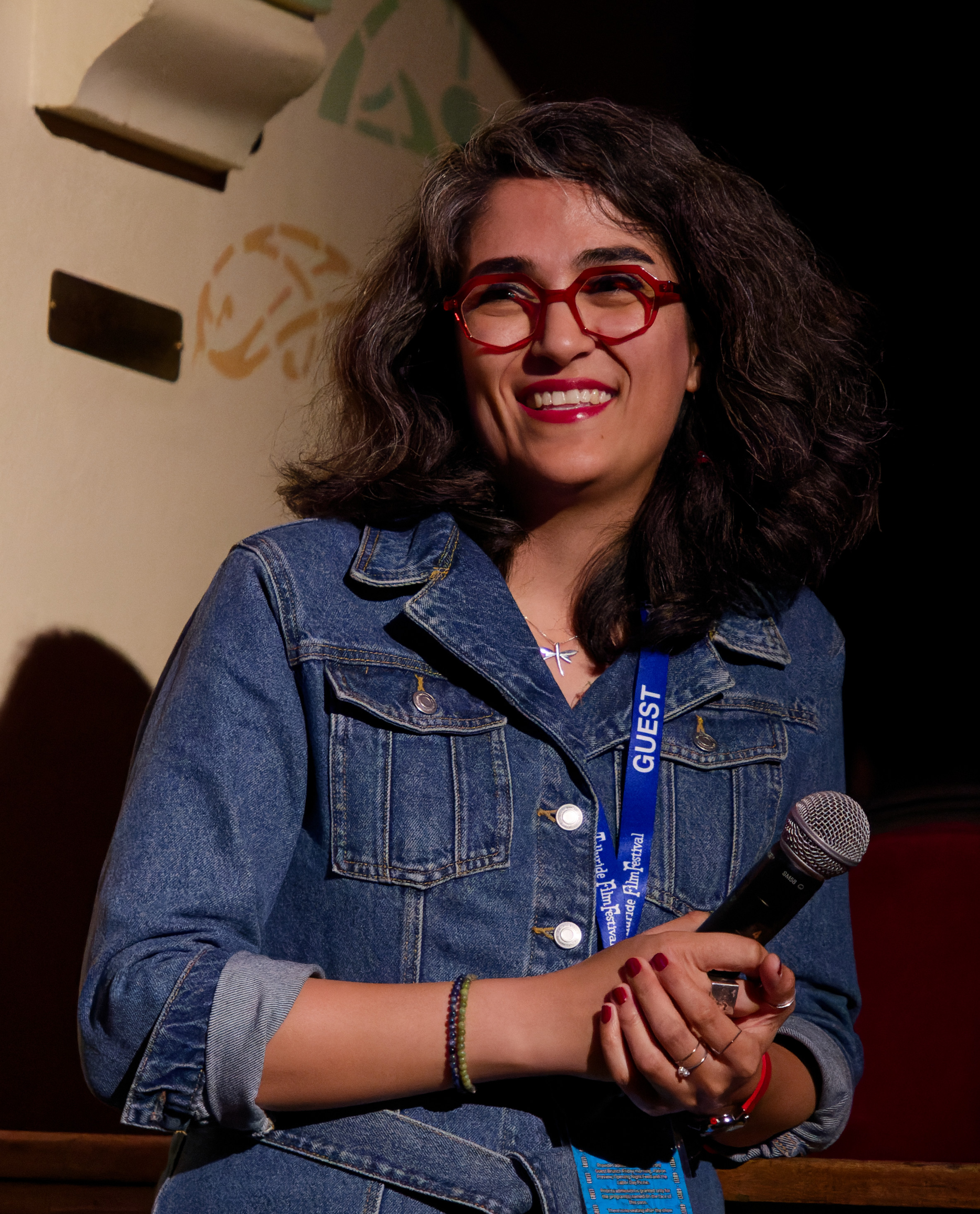
- Elahe Esmaili at the 2024 Telluride Film Festival
- Born: (31 October 1990) Mashhad, Iran
- Occupations: Writer, Director, Filmmaker
- Notable work: Doll (2021), Can I Hug You? (2023), A Move (2024)
- Awards: Best International Short, Hot Docs (2021), Best Youth Jury Short, Visions de Reel (2024)
- Website: www.elaheesmaili.com

Elahe Esmaili (Persian: الهه اسماعیلی; born 1990) is an Iranian filmmaker known for her films exploring women's rights and family in Iranian society. Her work has screened at major festivals including Telluride, Visions du Reel, IDFA, BFI London Film Festival, Hot Docs, and Sheffield Doc/Fest.

== Early life and education ==
Esmaili was born on 31 October 1990 in Mashhad, Iran. She attended Armine Mosalanejad High School. She began her academic career in engineering before shifting toward filmmaking. She ranked first in Iran's national university exam (Konkour) and went on to study at Tehran University of Art, earning her BA in film. She later completed an MA in Directing at National Film and Television School (NFTS) in the United Kingdom.

== Career ==
Esmaili's debut short documentary, The Doll (2021), was her BA graduation film. It won the Best International Short award at Hot Docs 2021 and received nominations or selections from the International Documentary Association (IDA) and the Critics' Choice Awards, screening at more than 50 festivals in total.

Her second film, Can I Hug You? (2023), is a personal documentary centered on a man who grew up in the religious city of Qom and experienced childhood sexual assault. The film follows his process of confronting that trauma. It premiered in the International Short Competition at Sheffield Doc/Fest in June 2023 and went on to win the Best Short Documentary award at the SIMA Awards, the One World Media award for best short documentary, and the NHK Grand Prix of the Japan Prize.

Her third film, A Move (2024), follows Esmaili's return to her hometown of Mashhad to help her parents relocate after 40 years, set against the backdrop of Iran's Woman, Life, Freedom movement. The film won the Best Youth Jury Short award at Visions du Reel, along with the Grand Prix and Audience Award at Uppsala International Short Film Festival. It has also screened at Telluride, BFI London Film Festival, Clermont-Ferrand, IDFA, DOK Leipzig, Sheffield Doc/Fest, DOC NYC, and DMZ Docs.

Esmaili's work is frequently noted for its focus on children's and women's rights, as well as stories of women overcoming societal barriers.

== Filmography ==
Year	Title	Role
2021	The Doll	Director, Producer, and Writer
2023	Can I Hug You?	Director, Co-Producer, and Writer
2024	A Move	Director, Co-Producer, and Writer

== Awards and Honors (Selected) ==
- Best International Short, Hot Docs (2021) – The Doll
- Best Short Documentary, SIMA Awards – Can I Hug You?
- IDA Award for Continuing Excellence (ACI) – Can I Hug You?
- One World Media Award, Best Short Documentary – Can I Hug You?
- NHK Grand Prix, Japan Prize – Can I Hug You?
- BIFA best short film nominee (2024) – A Move
- Best Youth Jury Short, Visions de Reel (2024) – A Move
- Grand prix and Audience Award, Uppsala International Short Film Festival – A Move
- Best short documentary at Huesca International Film Festival – A Move
- IDA best short film nominee – A Move
- Cinema eye honors best short film nominee – A Move
