= Copy Shop =

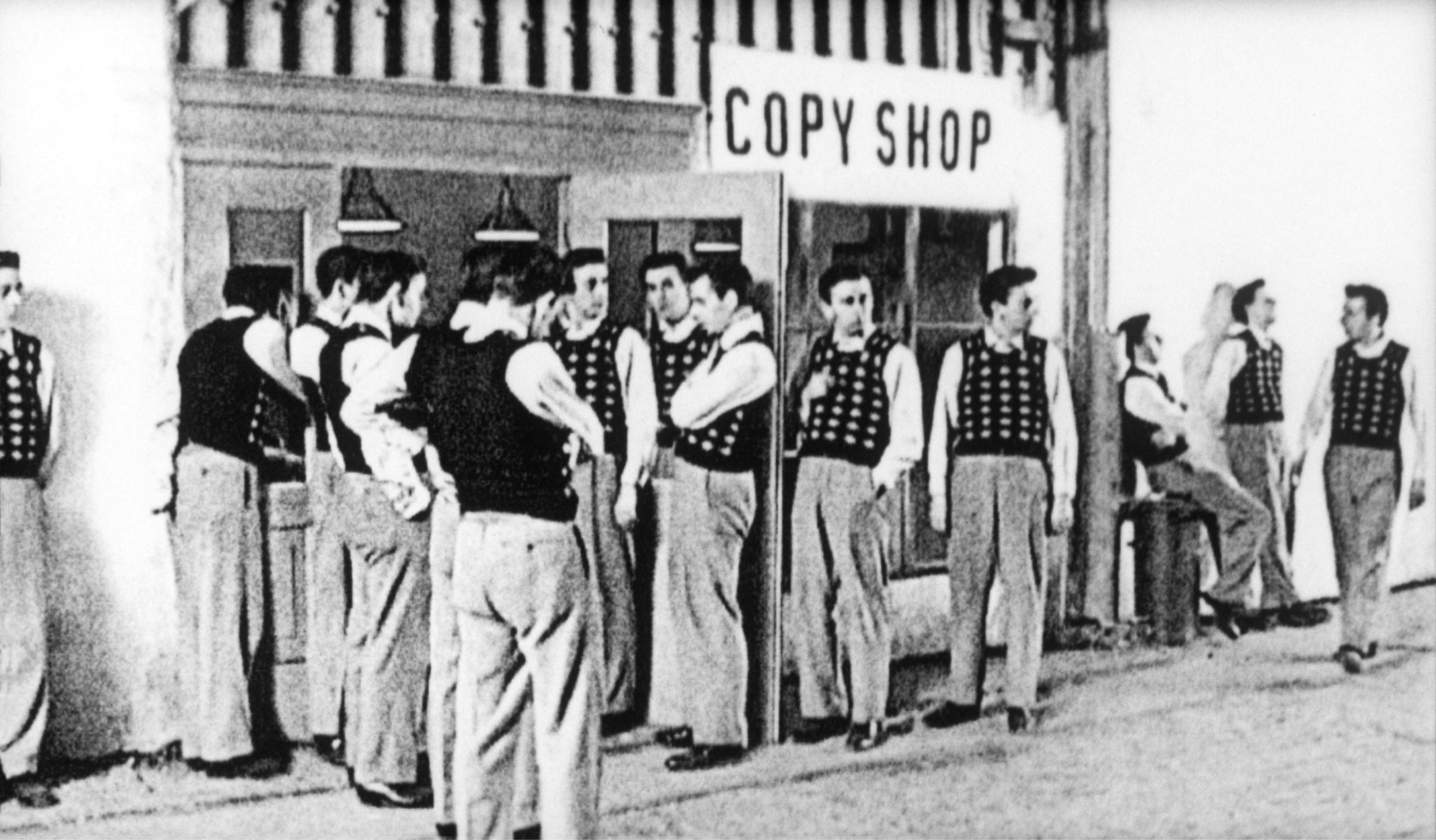
- Film still
- Directed by: Virgil Widrich
- Written by: Virgil Widrich
- Produced by: Virgil Widrich
- Starring: Johannes Silberschneider; Elisabeth Ebner-Haid
- Cinematography: Martin Putz
- Edited by: Virgil Widrich
- Music by: Alexander Zlamal
- Production company: Virgil Widrich Film- und Multimediaproduktions G.m.b.H.
- Distributed by: Sixpack Film
- Release date: 2001
- Running time: 12 minutes
- Country: Austria
- Language: Silent

Copy Shop is a 2001 Austrian short film written and directed by Virgil Widrich. The twelve-minute black-and-white film is composed of nearly 18,000 photocopied frames, creating a visual parable on duplication and loss of identity in the digital age. It was screened at more than 750 film festivals worldwide, received 43 international awards, and was nominated for both the Academy Award for Best Live Action Short Film and the European Film Award for Best Short Film in 2002.

== Plot ==
Alfred Kager, an employee in a copy shop, accidentally photocopies his hand one morning. Soon, the machine begins reproducing fragments of his daily life on its own. He discovers that identical copies of himself are appearing everywhere, until the entire world seems to be populated only by his duplicates. Desperate to stop the process, he unplugs the machines and flees, pursued by his own copies, before climbing a chimney and leaping into the void. The final sound resembles the tearing of paper.

== Production ==
Copy Shop was produced in Vienna in 2000–2001 by the Virgil Widrich Film- und Multimediaproduktions G.m.b.H. The film was shot digitally, and every single frame was printed out in black and white on a laser printer, then re-filmed frame by frame with a 35 mm animation camera. This hybrid technique transforms the process of copying itself into the subject of the film. The production was supported by the Austrian Federal Chancellery (Arts Division), the Province of Salzburg, the City of Vienna, and the ORF. Production design was by Joachim Luetke, cinematography by Martin Putz, and music and sound design by Alexander Zlamal.

In his accompanying essay Identity and the Cinema, Widrich describes the work as “an experiment on the dissolution of the filmic subject through reproduction” and “a reflection on cinema as a copy machine.”

== Release and festivals ==
The film premiered in January 2001 at the International Film Festival Rotterdam and was subsequently screened at more than 750 festivals worldwide, including Clermont-Ferrand, Kraków, Karlovy Vary, Dresden, Palm Springs, Uppsala, and the Museum of Modern Art in New York.

== Reception ==
Copy Shop received widespread critical acclaim. The Washington Post called it “an ingenious, visually stunning experimental film” that “recalls the most poetic films of the silent era.” The Guardian described it as “a dazzling nightmare” and “the most startling new discovery of the first few days” at Rotterdam. The New York Daily News called it “a Kafkaesque fantasy about a lonely guy who photocopies his hand one day at work and soon starts finding replicas of himself everywhere.” The Museum of Modern Art in New York reported that “the audience was overwhelmed.” Austrian newspapers praised the film as “an innovative work” (Kurier), “a grotesque metaphor about individuality” (Der Standard), and “a scurrile infinite loop about to devour the world” (Blimp).

== Awards ==
Copy Shop won 43 international awards, including:

- Best Original Score – Clermont-Ferrand International Short Film Festival (2002)
- Cracow Students Jury Award – Kraków Film Festival (2001)
- Golden Spike for Best Short Film – Valladolid International Film Festival (2001)
- Best Short Film – Aspen Shortsfest (2002)
- Jury Award – Palm Springs International ShortFest (2002)
- Best Experimental Film – Reale Film Festival, Milan (2022)

and numerous other jury and audience awards across Europe, Asia and North America.

It was nominated for the Academy Award for Best Live Action Short Film and the European Film Award for Best Short Film in 2002.
