= Tx-transform =

tx-transform is a film technique and software developed by Austrian filmmaker and media artist Martin Reinhart. It represents a specific implementation of slit-scan photography, in which one of the spatial axes (x or y) of an image is interchanged with the time axis (t). Normally, each frame of film depicts the entire spatial scene at one instant in time. In a tx-transformed film, each frame instead contains the entire duration of a shot but only a narrow section of space – for example, when cut along the horizontal axis, the left side of the image represents the “before” and the right side the “after.”

The term tx-transform also refers to a short film (Austria, 1998, 35 mm, Cinemascope, 5 min) that Reinhart created together with Virgil Widrich, in which the technique was first used and presented at festivals.

== Development ==
Between 1990 and 1996, Martin Reinhart developed the theoretical and technical foundations of tx-transform while studying at the University of Applied Arts Vienna under Bernhard Leitner. Early analogue experiments used a modified slit camera and led to the conceptual model of the “information block,” in which time layers can be “cut” along spatial directions to yield motion that is readable in space rather than time. These analogue tests culminated in purpose-built equipment (photo-finish style camera, motor controls) to scan images line by line from a video monitor, before the project moved to digital methods in the mid-1990s.

== Digital implementation ==
With the arrival of affordable video capture cards around 1996, Reinhart began experimenting with digital image sequences. Together with collaborator Toni Poeltl, he developed a DOS program named tx-transform that rearranged image data column by column.

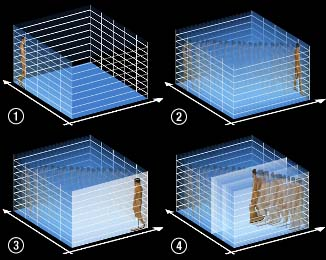
Scheme of the column rearrangement between input and output images as used in the »tx-transform« process

Technically, each frame of a video sequence is decomposed into its vertical pixel columns. The first frame of the transformed sequence consists of all first (e.g., leftmost) columns of every frame in the original sequence; the second frame consists of all the second columns, and so on. No information is added or lost—only re-ordered—which means applying the same transform a second time restores the original sequence losslessly. To retain the input aspect ratio and resolution, the number of input frames should match the number of vertical lines (e.g., 720 for PAL), which at 25 fps corresponds to about 28.8 seconds of footage.

== Artistic and cinematic principles ==
Philosophically, tx-transform represents a cut through the film's “information block” along a spatial rather than a temporal axis. Although this might seem unlikely to produce coherent imagery, results often remain surprisingly readable: buildings appear to move, heads seem to grow from within themselves, and fast-moving trains become shorter as speed increases. In contrast to conventional filmmaking, the relative motion of camera and subject is crucial; removing a single frame from the source footage can affect the entire transformation, so conventional editing is constrained.

== Film and further applications ==
The short film tx-transform (1998) marked the first cinematic presentation of the technique and has been distributed through sixpackfilm. The underlying principle has also informed media art installations such as tx-mirror (a “magical mirror” installation exploring a universe in which time and space are reversed), presented within Ars Electronica's *Out of the Box* program and linked to the exhibition *Art in Motion. 100 masterpieces with and through media* at ZKM Karlsruhe. Other institutions have documented related installations and presentations of the technique.

== Reception and influence ==
The technique has been discussed in academic and curatorial contexts for its inversion of cinematic space and time, alongside related approaches by artists such as Daniel Crooks. Popular-science and photography outlets have used slit-scan examples to explain the perceptual effects of line-by-line imaging and finish-line cameras, providing wider context for understanding tx-transform's lineage within time-based imaging.

== See also ==
- Slit-scan photography
- Experimental film
