= Fast film =

Fast film may refer to:

- Fast film, photographic film that is highly sensitive to light and can be recorded at high film speed
- Fast Film (film), a 2003 film directed by Virgil Widrich
