= Anja Salomonowitz =

Austrian film director and screenwriter

Anja Salomonowitz (born 12 November 1976 in Vienna) is an Austrian film director and screenwriter, known for her hybrid films that blend documentary and fiction to explore political and social themes.

== Biography ==
Anja Salomonowitz grew up in a Jewish family in Vienna and was a member of the socialist-Zionist youth organisation Hashomer Hatzair. She studied film in Vienna and Berlin and worked for director Ulrich Seidl during her studies.

Her work combines documentary, fiction, and essayistic forms. Real experiences are artistically transformed through stylisation and alienation, often following a strict colour concept. Salomonowitz's films are explicitly political and expand the limits of cinematic storytelling. Her films have received international recognition, numerous awards, and are regularly shown at major film festivals including the Berlinale and the Diagonale in Graz.

Her first film, You Will Never Understand This (2003), is a 52-minute documentary in which she confronts her family's wartime past: her Jewish grandaunt survived a concentration camp, her nanny joined the socialist resistance, and her grandmother “did nothing.”

Her one-minute short film Codename Figaro (2006), made for the Mozart Year, presents an ironic conversation between an Austrian woman and her foreign fiancé, reflecting on Austrian immigration policy and the idea of a "sham marriage."

In 2006 she completed It Happened Just Before (Kurz davor ist es passiert), a documentary about human trafficking that defies conventional documentary form. The women's stories are retold by non-actors who are connected to the events in their daily lives. The film premiered at the Berlinale 2007 (Forum) and received the Caligari Film Prize.

Her first feature film, Spanien (Spain, 2012), co-written with author Dimitré Dinev and with music by Max Richter, explores migration and identity through intersecting storylines.

In The 727 Days Without Karamo (2013), she follows binational couples struggling against Austrian immigration law. The film won the Silver Eye Award at the Jihlava International Documentary Film Festival.

This Movie Is a Gift (2019) is an experimental portrait of artist Daniel Spoerri—a reflection on memory, art, and exchange. The film features her son Oskar (2008–2020), who plays Spoerri as a child. It won the Franz Grabner Prize for Best Documentary at the Diagonale 2021.

Her most recent film, Sleeping with a Tiger (Mit einem Tiger schlafen, 2024), is a creative and introspective portrait of painter Maria Lassnig. The film premiered in the Forum section of the 74th Berlin International Film Festival and won several awards at the Diagonale, including Best Screenplay and Best Artistic Achievement.

Salomonowitz lives in Vienna. She is currently developing a film about Ukrainian activist Inna Shevchenko, founder of the feminist group Femen.

She has taught at film and art universities such as Aalto University in Helsinki and the University of Applied Arts Vienna, serves as a tutor at the Jihlava Documentary Academy, and regularly gives masterclasses on artistic filmmaking. She has also chaired the Austrian Documentary Film Association and the Austrian Directors’ Association.

Salomonowitz has three sons with film director Virgil Widrich; their son Oskar (2008–2020) died in an accident.

== Filmography ==
Documentary films:

- 2003 – You Will Never Understand This (Das wirst du nie verstehen), 52 min
- 2006 – It Happened Just Before (Kurz davor ist es passiert), 72 min
- 2013 – The 727 Days Without Karamo (Die 727 Tage ohne Karamo), 80 min
- 2016 – The Boy Will Be Circumcised (Der Junge wird beschnitten), 75 min
- 2019 – This Movie Is a Gift (Dieser Film ist ein Geschenk), 72 min

Feature films:

- 2012 – Spanien (Spain), 102 min
- 2024 – Sleeping with a Tiger (Mit einem Tiger schlafen), 100 min

Short films:

- 2000 – Carmen (23 min, video)
- 2001 – Get to Attack (5 min)
- 2002 – Projektionen eines Filmvorführers in einem Pornokino (14 min, video)
- 2005 – Ein Monument für die Niederlage (video installation)
- 2006 – Codename Figaro – Mozart 2006 (1 min, video)

== Awards ==
- 2006 – Vienna Film Award
- 2007 – Caligari Film Prize, Berlinale Forum
- 2007 – Innovative Artistic Award, Mar del Plata
- 2007 – New Vision Best Director Award, Alba International Film Festival
- 2007 – Peace Film Prize of Osnabrück
- 2010 – Outstanding Artist Award of the Austrian Federal Ministry of Art and Culture
- 2013 – Silver Eye Award, Jihlava International Documentary Film Festival
- 2019 – Honorary Award of the Women's Film Days (Widerstandskino, with Mirjam Unger)
- 2021 – Franz Grabner Prize for This Movie Is a Gift
- 2024 – Thomas Pluch Special Award for Best Screenplay, Diagonale
- 2024 – Acting Award to Birgit Minichmayr for Sleeping with a Tiger
- 2024 – Award for Outstanding Production (Antonin Svoboda), Diagonale
- 2024 – Award for Best Production Design (Martin Reiter and Andreas Ertl), Diagonale
- 2024 – Best Artistic Achievement (Screenplay and Direction), Bolzano Film Festival
