= Dreams Rewired =

- Poster
- Directed by: Manu Luksch, Martin Reinhart, Thomas Tode
- Written by: Manu Luksch, Mukul Patel
- Produced by: Alexander Dumreicher-Ivanceanu, Linda Matern, Bady Minck, Mukul Patel
- Narrated by: Tilda Swinton
- Edited by: Oliver Neumann
- Music by: Siegfried Friedrich
- Distributed by: Icarus Films, Polyfilm
- Release date: 25 January 2015 (International Film Festival Rotterdam)
- Running time: 85 minutes
- Countries: Austria; Germany; United Kingdom
- Language: English

Dreams Rewired (German title: Mobilisierung der Träume) is a 2015 Austrian/German/British feature documentary/essay film that reflects on the desires and anxieties provoked by contemporary information technologies, using archival footage from the late 19th and early 20th centuries. It is notable for including several previously unseen or newly restored films, including excerpts from the recently discovered version of Sergei Eisenstein's Battleship Potemkin with the original 1925 score by Edmund Meisel.

== Description ==
Dreams Rewired is an assemblage of nearly 200 films, ranging from the 'pre-cinematic' experiments of Étienne-Jules Marey and the political cinema of Dziga Vertov, through to newsreels and early dramatic works by Alice Guy-Blaché. A voiceover text articulates the footage for contemporary contexts, drawing on the language of digital culture and social media. Eschewing a traditional chronology of technological development, the film traces several trajectories through the electric information age, including that of the changing economic and cultural status of women. In her essay accompanying the DVD release, film theoretician Bodil Marie Stavning Thomsen describes it as an 'extended meditation on media, desire, and futurity [... that] transparently uses a double exposure of past (archive footage) and present (contemporary voiceover) to bring historical context to current dilemmas.' To give a material example, she notes that the film 'point[s] simultaneously back to the colonial expropriation of land, mineral wealth and labour (as material precondition for technological development), and to its continuation in, for example, contemporary mining (of coltan for electronic components in the Democratic Republic of Congo, say).' In a review reproduced in American Journalism, Patrick G. Wilz further remarks on the political content of the film, which concludes with 'marketers, politicians, and corporations [learning] to regulate and leverage communications technology to control the behavior of theiraudiences; appetites manufactured in order to be fed, visions of the future conjured in order to be sold.'

== Cast ==
- Tilda Swinton as narrator

== Release ==
The film premiered at the International Film Festival Rotterdam 2015 and had a limited theatrical release in the US and Europe.

=== Home media ===
The film is distributed on DVD by Icarus Films (North America) and absolutMEDIEN (Germany), and is available to stream via iTunes (USA and Canada) and Amazon.

=== Public collections ===
The Margaret Herrick Library at the Academy of Motion Picture Arts & Sciences holds a copy of the film transcript in its permanent Core Collection.

== Music ==
The soundtrack by Austrian composer Siegfried Friedrich was nominated for Best Music at the Austrian Film Awards, and won the German Documentary Film Music Award.

== Awards ==
4th German Documentary Film Music Award, Internationales Dokumentarfilmfestival München (DOK.fest) 2016.

Best Documentary Feature, Moscow International Documentary Film Festival 2016.

Papierene Gustl Award – Austrian Film Critics' Guild Award 2017.

Jury Award, Ann Arbor Film Festival 2015.
