= Maria Lassnig =

Austrian artist (1919–2014)

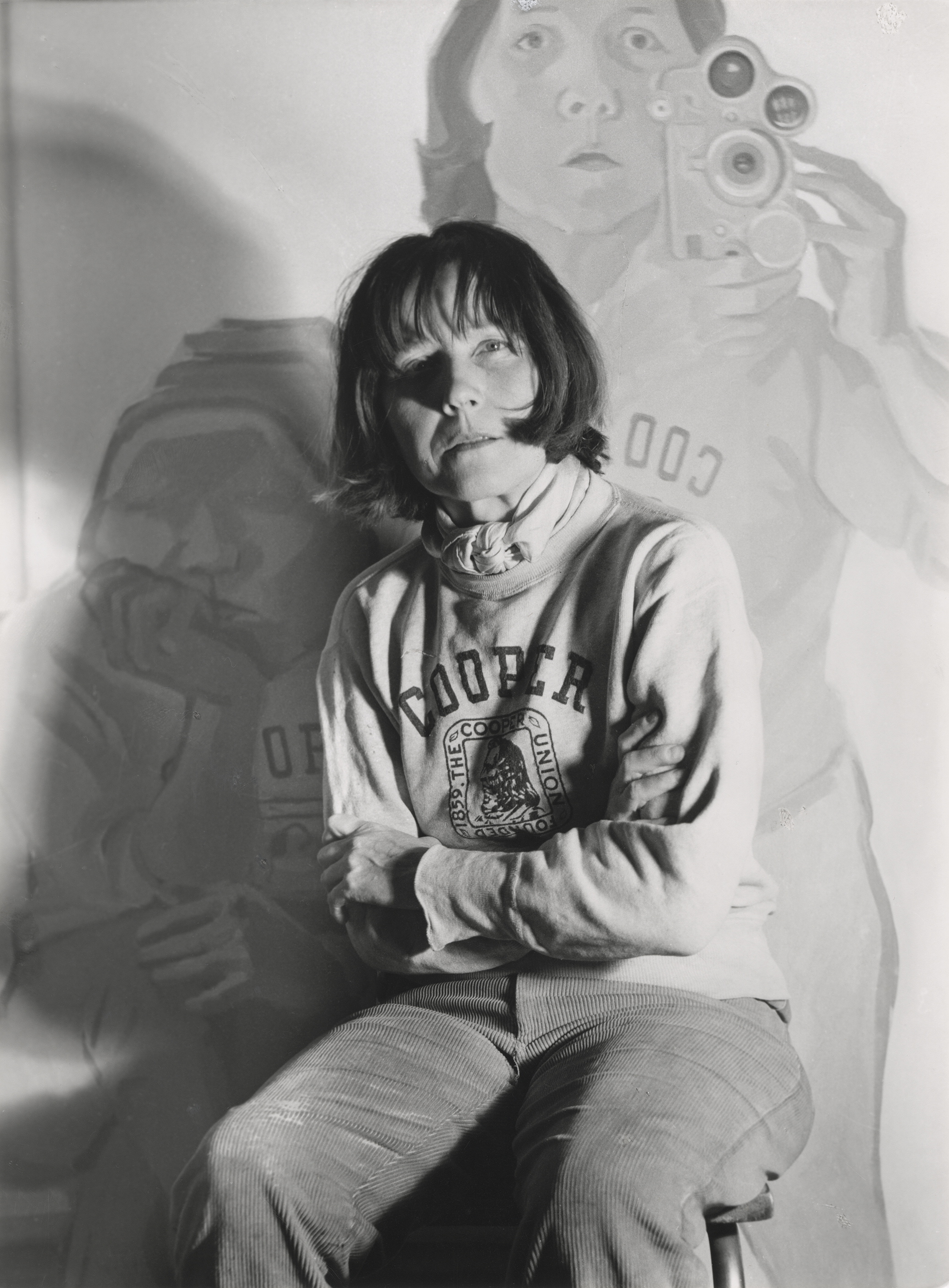
- Born: 8 September 1919; Kappel am Krappfeld, Carinthia, Austria
- Died: 6 May 2014 (aged 94); Vienna, Austria
- Known for: Painting
- Awards: Grand Austrian State Prize (1988), Golden Lion Lifetime Achievement Award (2013)
- Website: marialassnig.org

Maria Lassnig (8 September 1919 – 6 May 2014) was an Austrian artist known for her painted self-portraits and her theory of "body awareness". In 1980, she became a professor for Painting at the University of Applied Arts Vienna, where she taught until her death. She was the first female artist to win the Grand Austrian State Prize in 1988 and was awarded the Austrian Decoration for Science and Art in 2005.

== Early life ==
Maria Lassnig was born in Kappel am Krappfeld, Austria, on 8 September 1919. Her mother gave birth to her out of wedlock and later married a much older man, but their relationship was troubled and Lassnig was raised mostly by her grandmother. She attended the Academy of Fine Arts Vienna during World War II.

== Work ==
Lassnig is credited with helping to introduce Informalism and Tachisme into postwar Austrian art. In the 1950s, Lassnig was part of the Hundsgruppe ("Dog Pack") group, which also included Arnulf Rainer, Ernst Fuchs, Anton Lehmden, Arik Brauer and Wolfgang Hollegha. The works of the group were influenced by abstract expressionism and action painting. In 1951 Lassnig traveled to Paris with Arnulf Rainer where they organized the exhibition Junge unifigurative Malerei at the Kärnten Art Association. In Paris she also met the surrealist artist André Breton and the poets Paul Celan and Benjamin Péret.

Though Lassnig began her career painting abstract works, she always created self-portraits. One of her earliest was Expressive Self-Portrait (1945), which she painted only weeks after leaving Vienna. In 1948 Lassnig coined the term "body consciousness" (Körpergefühlmalerei in her native German) to describe her practice. In this style, Lassnig only depicted the parts of her body that she actually felt as she worked. As such, many of her self-portraits depict figures that are missing body parts or use unnatural colours. The shading of the grotesque forms then become a code for interpreting her "Körpergefühlmalerei." For example, red often acts as the most significant color in her paintings, sometimes suggesting pain but often just intense feeling or strain. By the 1960s Lassnig turned away from abstract painting altogether and began to focus more wholly on the human body and psyche. Since that time she created hundreds of self-portraits. Most of her work in the 1970s and 1980s paired her own image with objects, animals or other people, frequently with a blocked out or averted gaze, suggesting interiority.

From 1968 to 1980, Lassnig lived in New York City. From 1970 to 1972 she studied animated film at the School of Visual Arts in New York City. During this time she made six short films, including Selfportrait (1971) and Couples (1972). Her most famous film, however, Kantate (also known as The Ballad of Maria Lassnig), was produced in 1992 when she was seventy-three years old. Kantate (1992) depicts a filmic self-portrait of the artist set to songs and music.

In 1980, she returned to become a professor at the University of Applied Arts Vienna, becoming the first female professor of painting in a German-speaking country. She was a chair at the University until 1997. In 1997 she also published a book of her drawings entitled Die Feder ist die Schwester des Pinsels (or The Pen is the Sister of the Paintbrush). She continued to paint, and in 2008 made her provocative self-portrait, You or Me, which exemplifies the often confrontational nature of her works.

In 2013 Lassnig received the Golden Lion Award for lifetime achievement at the 55th Venice Biennale. Her work was included in the 2024 exhibition Making Their Mark: Works from the Shah Garg Collection at the Berkeley Art Museum and Pacific Film Archive (BAMPFA).

== Gallery ==
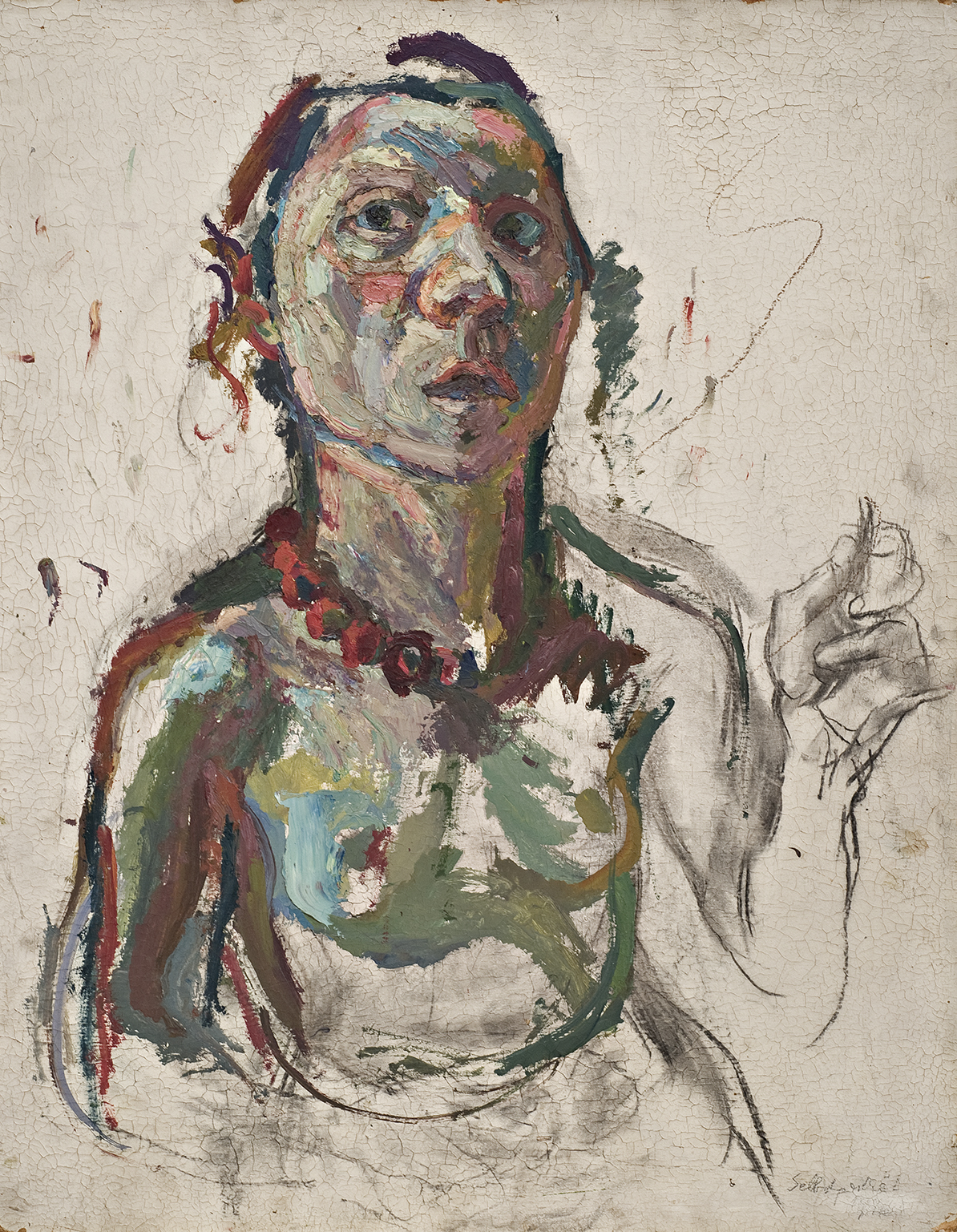
Painting "Selbstporträt expressiv" (Expressive Self-Portrait), 1945

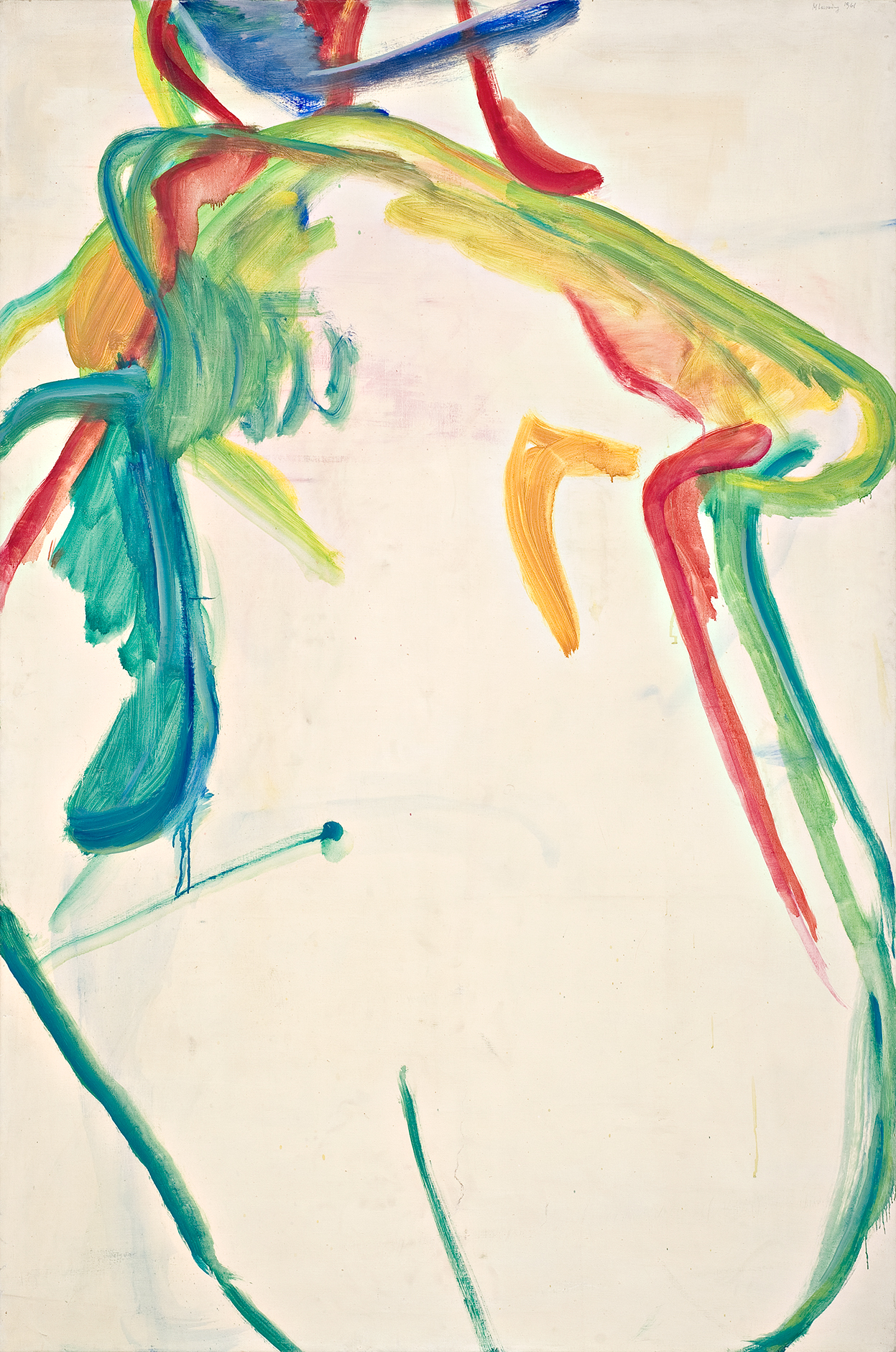
Painting "Dicke Grüne" (Fat Green), 1961

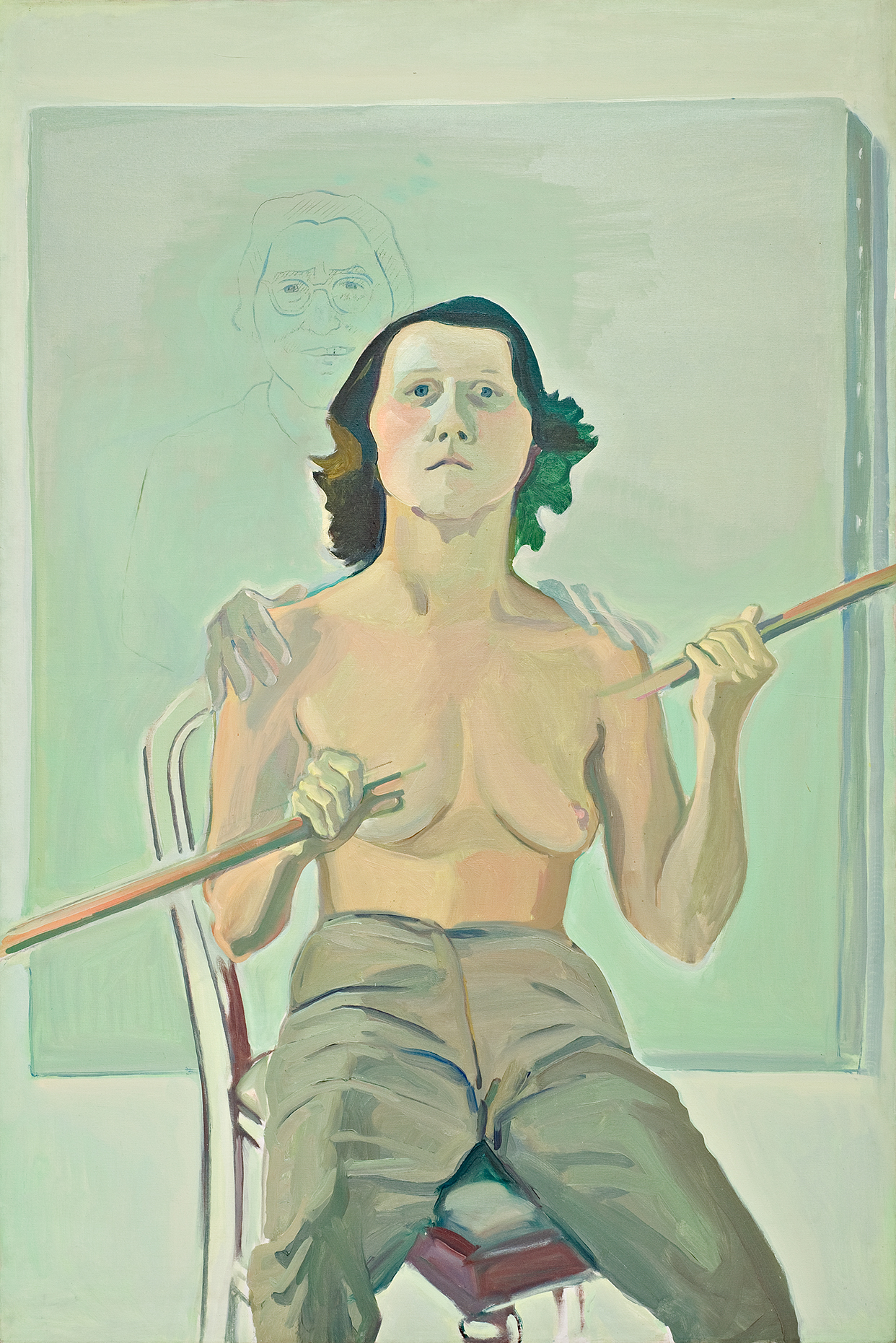
painting "Selbstporträt mit Stab" (Self-Portrait with Stick), 1971

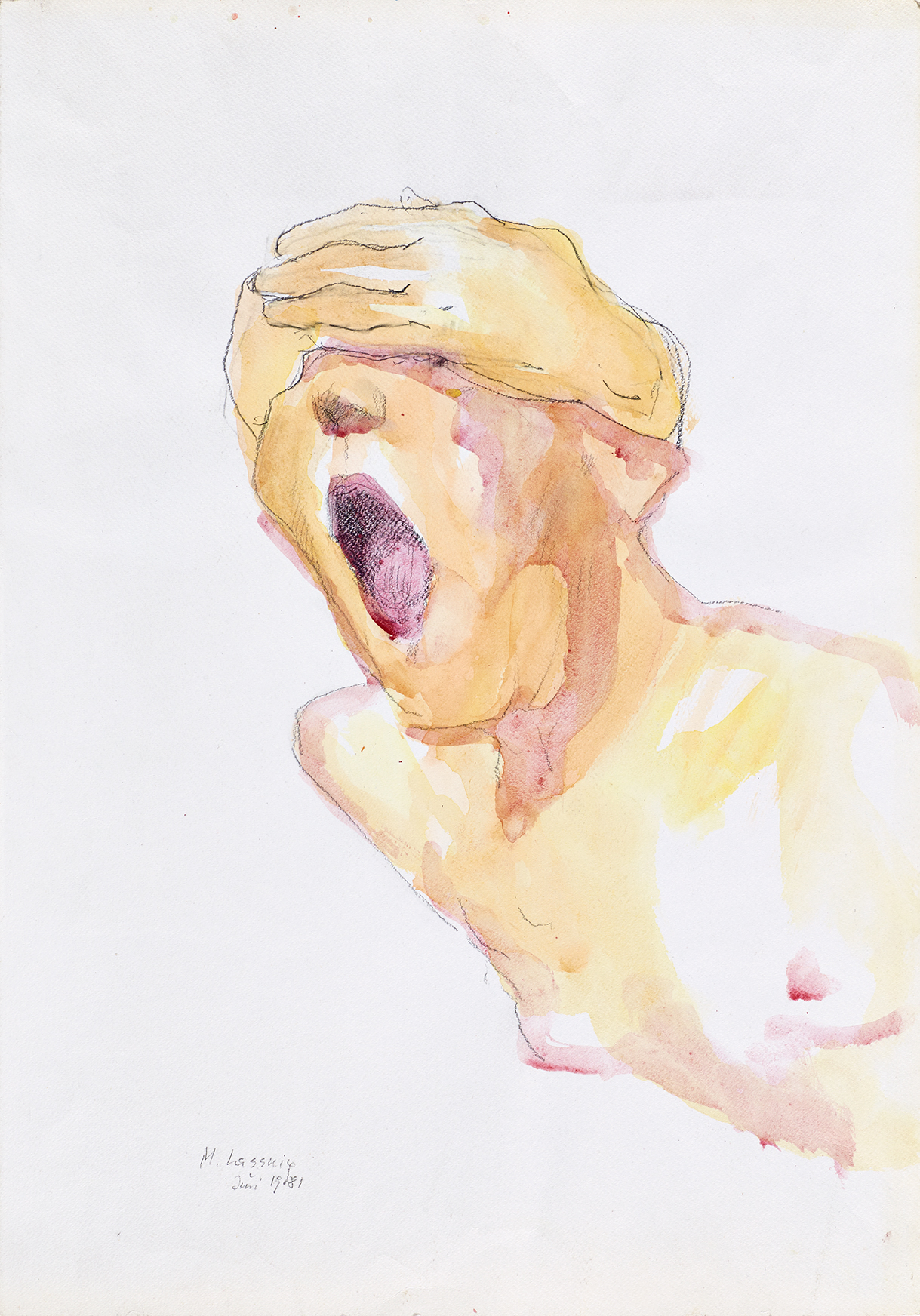
Drawing "Untitled (Screaming Woman)", 1981

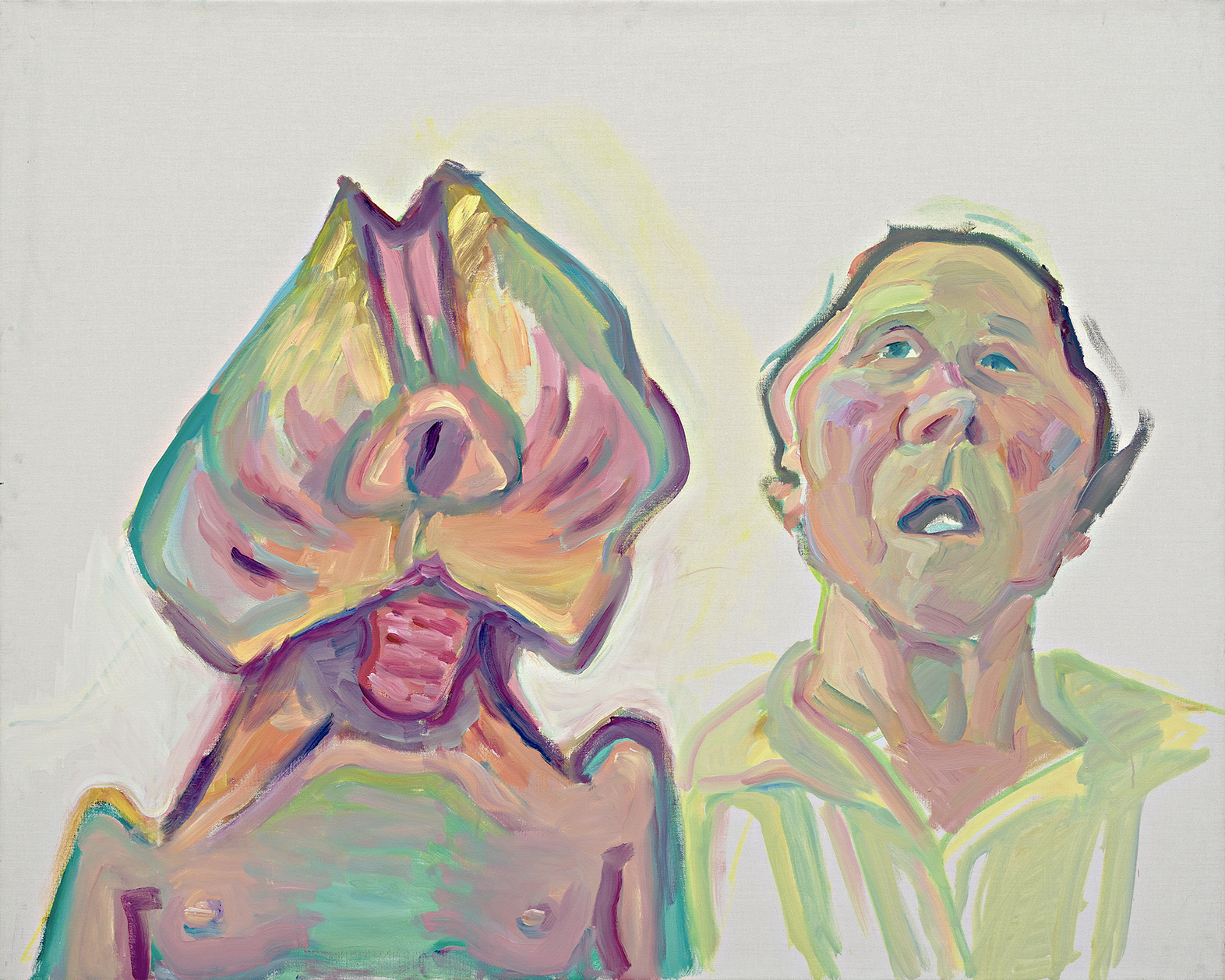
Painting "Zwei Arten zu sein (Doppelselbstporträt)" – Two Ways of Being (Double Self-Portrait), 2000

== Exhibitions ==
Well into her sixties and late in her career, Lassnig began to receive widespread recognition, especially in Europe. She represented Austria at the Venice Biennale with Valie Export in 1980. In 1996 a retrospective of her work was held at the Centre Georges Pompidou. She participated in documenta in both 1982 and 1997. For the 2005/2006 season at the Vienna State Opera she designed the large-scale (176 m²) Breakfast with Ear for the ongoing series "Safety curtain", conceived by museum in progress. In 2008 an exhibition of her recent paintings was shown at the Serpentine Gallery which also travelled to the Contemporary Arts Center in the Lois & Richard Rosenthal Center for Contemporary Art in Cincinnati (2009). The exhibition was curated by Julia Peyton-Jones and Hans Ulrich Obrist in association with Rebecca Morrill and featured thirty canvases and seven films.

Lassnig's later solo exhibitions included It's art that keeps one ever young, Städtische Galerie im Lenbachhaus, Munich, Germany (2010), 'Maria Lassnig. Films’, Friedrich Petzel Gallery, New York NY, (2011), and The Location of Pictures, Universalmuseum Joanneum; Graz (2012). as well as Deichtorhallen; Hamburg (2013).

MoMA PS1 held a major exhibition in 2014 of works, many of which that had not previously been seen in the United States before including 50 paintings, filmic works and a selection of watercolors. They have continued to show her films, as in the 2018 exhibition Maria Lassnig: New York Films 1970-1980.

Since 2014, the year of her death, her work was shown at the Fondacio Tapies in Barcelona (2015), Tate Liverpool (2016), the Albertina, Vienna (2017), and the Zachęta National Gallery of Art, Warsaw (2017), the National Gallery in Prague (2018), Kunstmuseum Basel (2018), and Stedelijk Museum Amsterdam (2019). Lassnig's work was included in the 2022 exhibition Women Painting Women at the Modern Art Museum of Fort Worth.

From October 15, 2022–April 2, 2023, the Museum of Fine Arts, Boston exhibited Body Awareness: Maria Lassnig’s Experimental Films that “16 pieces that explore physical sensation, autobiography, friendship, and New York City, where the artist lived in the 1970s.”

== Collections ==
Lassnig's work is held in the following permanent collections:

- Museum of Modern Art, New York
- Albertina, Vienna

== Legacy ==
Critics have pointed to the influence that Lassnig's work had on contemporary artists like Nicole Eisenman, Dana Schutz, Thomas Schütte, and Amy Sillman.

Founded in 2015, the Maria Lassnig Foundation is dedicated to propagating the extensive oeuvre of the artist and to ensure that Lassnig's legacy is secured over the long term.

== Recognition ==
- Creative Artists Public Service Program Fellowship in the field of film of The New York City Council on the Arts (1973/1974)
- Grand Austrian State Prize for Visual Arts (1988)
- Honorary doctor, University of Klagenfurt (1999 / 2013)
- Roswitha Haftmann Prize (2002)
- Rubens Prize of the City of Siegen (2002)
- Max Beckmann Prize (2004)
- Austrian Decoration for Science and Art (2005)
- Golden Lion for Lifetime Achievement (with Marisa Merz) at the 55th Venice Biennial (2013)

== Sleeping with a Tiger biopic ==
A biopic on her life was made by Anja Salomonowitz in 2024. Titled as Sleeping with a Tiger, the film was screened in February 2024, as part of the 74th Berlin International Film Festival, in Forum.
