= Critical practice =

Critical practice is the methodology used by a critic or observer to understand and evaluate a field of knowledge. While sometimes the fields of knowledge studied are academic, non-academic fields such as merchandising, law enforcement and medical clinical practice have been extensively studied. Critical practice is grounded in the concepts of critical theory. Consultants employing critical practice skills aim to help people improve outcomes. Analysis is applied to groups working in a particular area of expertise and with identifiable practice skills, and usually to a defined range of problems and situations. Thus, practice tends to be based on a restricted view of people and their problems with a limited range of values applied in that practice.

Critical practice aims to develop the ability and skill to see beyond the usual concerns of any given profession, into its unintended side effects, causes and consequences, and to do so from a critical and evaluative perspective.

Thus, for example, the profession of social work might be practiced critically through practitioners being conscious that their role may be seen, and could operate, as an agent of social control, rather than just one of promoting some degree of liberation or of empowerment. In such a case the practitioner would be both the observer and the observed.

== See also ==
- Evidence-based practice
- Critical Practice (art)

== Sources ==
- A. Brechin, H. Brown and M. Eby (eds.), Critical Practice in Health and Social Care, Sage 2000.
