= Manu Luksch =

Austrian artist/filmmaker

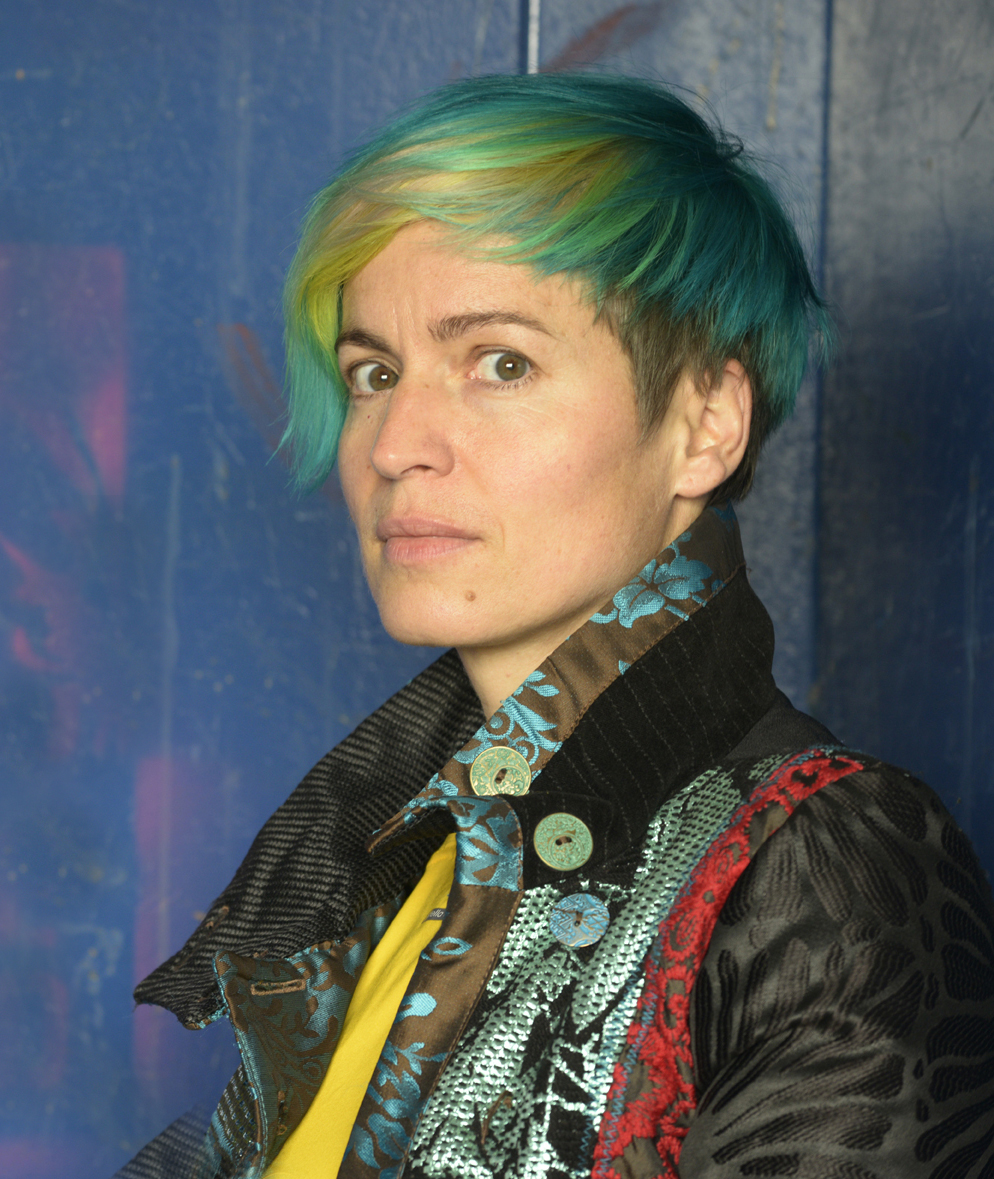
- Luksch in 2018
- Born: 1970 (age 55–56); Vienna, Austria
- Occupations: Artist, filmmaker
- Notable work: Faceless_(2007_film), Dreams_Rewired, Algo-Rhythm
- Website: www.manuluksch.com

Manu Luksch (born 1970) is an Austrian intermedia artist and filmmaker who is known for her wide-ranging critical practice that interrogates sociopolitical, legal, and technological infrastructure through interdisciplinary collaboration, the creation of participatory tools and platforms, and the instigation of novel processes. Specific works address the regulation of public space, the construction of independent media infrastructure, and widespread corporate data surveillance.

Through the 2000s, a major focus of Luksch's research was the data trace – the digital shadows cast by humans in networked space in the course of daily activities. More recently, this focus has broadened to include algorithmic management as deployed in 'smart city' contexts. Although her work is found in museums and galleries, it is also manifest in academic, activist and other non-art contexts. Luksch is perhaps best known for two film works, Faceless (2007) and Dreams Rewired (2015, as codirector).

== Education ==
Luksch initially studied at University of Fribourg in Switzerland and holds MA degrees in History from the University of Vienna and in Fine Arts and Education from the Academy of Fine Arts Vienna. She traveled as a Foreign Scholar to the Faculty of Fine Arts at Chulalongkorn University in 1993, and to Chiang Mai University in 1994.

== Early career ==
While a student at the Academy of Fine Arts, Luksch worked with film director Peter Greenaway on his exhibition 100 Objects to represent the World (Hofburg, Vienna, 1992) as photographer and production assistant, and on the subsequent exhibition The Stairs: Munich Projection. In 1996, Luksch was appointed director of Medienlabor München, a position she held until 1998. In 1998, Luksch co-curated Art Servers Unlimited together with media theoretician Armin Medosch, the first conference to focus on a range of noncommercial initiatives to support the blend of creative, experimental, socio-cultural, artistic, critical use of the internet, hosted at the ICA London.

== Filmography ==
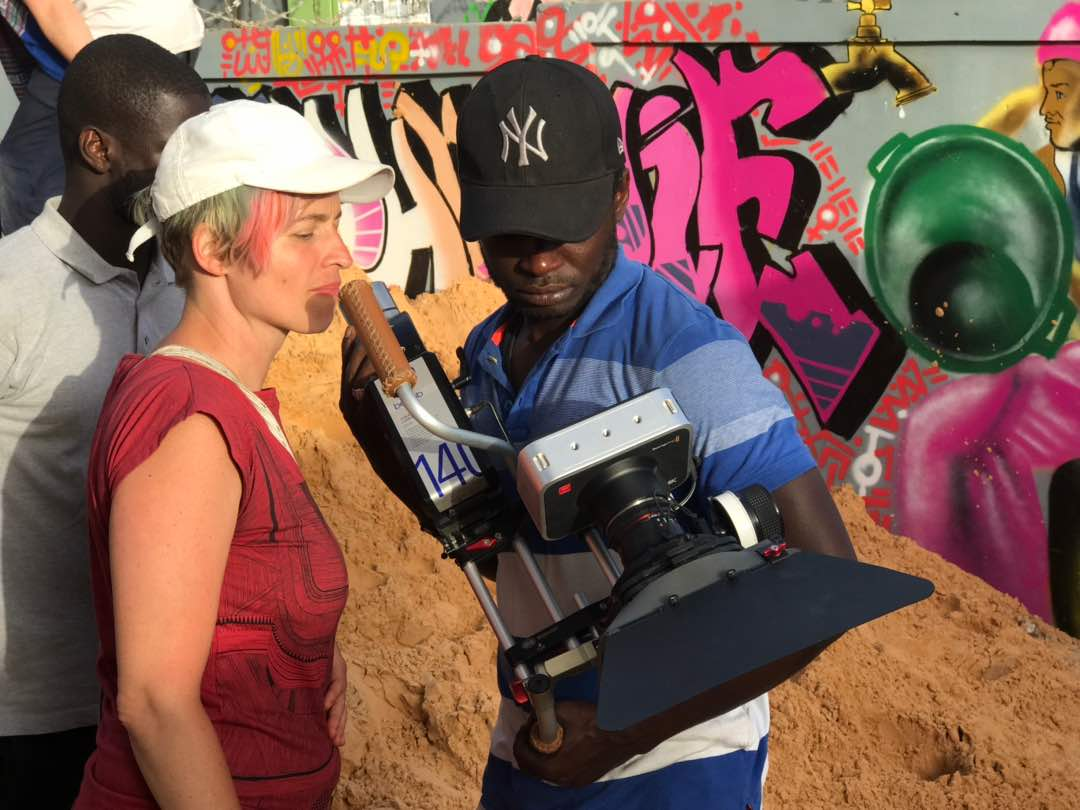
- Film director Manu Luksch and DoP Baila Sy, Dakar, on scene of hip hop musical-on-film Algo-Rhythm
  Algo-Rhythm (2018)
- 3rd Quarterly Report (2016)
- Dreams Rewired (2015)
- Unknown Territories (2014)
- Architekturbureau Lichtpause / Blue-Sky Blueprint (2011)
- Make It Snow! Make It Snow! Make It Snow! (2008)
- Mapping CCTV Around Whitehall (2008)
- Faceless (2007)
- Virtual Borders (2004)
- Broadbandit Highway (2001)
- Art Servers Unlimited (1998)
- So Oder Anders (1996)

== Publications ==
- Luksch, Manu. Signature or Right Thumbprint, Goethe Institute Bangkok, 1994.
- Luksch, Manu & Medosch, Armin. Art Servers Unlimited, ASU, 1998.
- Luksch, Manu & Medosch, Armin. ‘Apropos Art Servers Unlimited’. New Media Culture in Europe, edited by F. Boyd, Uitgeverij De Balie and the Virtual Platform, 1999.
- Luksch, Manu. ‘Virtual Borders or Digital Divide?’ net.congestion.reader, edited by Geet Lovink, De Balie, 2009.
- Luksch, Manu & Medosch, Armin. ‘Luksch & Medosch’. net.art 2.0. Neue Materialien zur Netkunst, by T. Baumgärtel, Verlag für moderne Kunst, 2001.
- Luksch, Manu & Patel, Mukul. ‘Wearable Computing and Wireless Networks.’ Cumulus: Value in design: disabling disablement, enabling enablement edited by Y. Sotamaa, University of Art and Design Helsinki, 2003.
- Luksch, Manu & Patel, Mukul. ‘ambientTV.NET: You Call It Art’. The Alternative Media Handbook, edited by K. Coyer, T. Dowmunt & A. Fountain, Routledge, 2007
- Luksch, Manu & Patel, Mukul. ‘Chasing the data shadow. A filmmaker’s close-up encounter with the Data Protection Act’Ars Electronica: Goodbye Privacy, edited by Gerfried Stocker & Christine Schöpf, Hatje Cantz Verlag, 2007 also available online in Variant, no. 31 (2008).
- Luksch, Manu & Patel, Mukul, eds. Ambient Information Systems, AIS, 2009.
- Luksch, Manu. ‘From social fact to science fiction. The incident in the incidental.’ n.paradoxa, Vol. 22, 2008.
- Luksch, Manu. ‘Moonwalk in EchtZeit.’ Raum in den Künsten. Konstruktion - Bewegung - Politik, edited by Avanessian, Armen & Franck Hofmann, Wilhelm Fink Verlag, 2010.
- Gürses, Seda; Luksch, Manu & Teran, Michelle. ‘A Trialogue on Interventions in Surveillance Space: Seda Gürses in conversation with Michelle Teran and Manu Luksch.’ Surveillance & Society, Vol. 7, No 2, 2010
- Luksch, Manu. ‘Alltagslabor Function Creep’. Interventionen. Grenzüberschreitungen in Ästhetik, Politik und Ökonmie, edited by D. Hartmann, I. Lemke, & J. Nitsche, München: Wilhelm Fink Verlag, 2012.
- Luksch, Manu. ‘From the cellar to the cloud: the network-archive as locus of power’. Lost and Living (in) Archives, edited by A. Dekker, Valiz, 2017

== Awards and appointments ==
- Outstanding Artist Award for Media Art, Republic of Austria (2023)
- Roberta Denning Visiting Artist, Stanford University (2021)
- Marianne von Willemer Prize for Digital Art, Ars Electronica Center (2012)
- Olympics Commission, muf Art & Architecture / London Thames Gateway (2012)
- ELEVATE Award, Graz (2015)
- New Approaches, FLAMIN/Film London (2015-16)
- Best Feature Documentary, Moscow International Film Festival (2016)
- Best Feature Documentary Soundtrack, DOK.FEST Munich (2016)
- Visiting Fellow, Centre for Cultural Studies, Goldsmiths, University of London (2016-19)
- Open Society Fellowship, Open Society Foundations (2017)
- Several Arts Council England and Innovative Film Austria awards since 2001

== Collections ==
Works by Luksch are held in the

- Collection de Centre Georges Pompidou
- BFI National Archive
- Core Collection, Academy of Motion Picture Arts & Sciences

== Bibliography ==
Andrew, Sarah, and Simon Stokes, editors. Art Law Field Guide. Arts Council England, 2008.

Arns, Inke. “Transparent World. Minoritarian Tactics in the Age of Transparency.” Un_imaginable, edited by Dennis Del Favero, Ursula Frohne, and Peter Weibel. Hatje Cantz, 2008, pp. 20-35.

Arns, Inke. “Transparency and Politics. On Spaces of the Political beyond the Visible, or: How transparency came to be the lead paradigm of the 21st century.” The Aesthetic Interface, edited by Søren Pold, et al. Aarhus UP, 2010.

Avanessian, Armen. “Gesichter und Geschichten des Raumes – Von technologischen und fiktionalen Räumen.” Raum in den Künsten. Konstruktion, Bewegung, Politik, edited by Armen Avanessian and Franck Hofmann. Verlag Tranversale, 2010, pp. 233-242.

Bonin, V., & Choinière, F., eds. Fonction/Fiction. L'image utilitaire reconfigurée, Édipresse, 2009.

Carvalo, M. ‘Affective Territories’ in INFLeXions Journal No. 3, 2009.

Cazdyn, E. The Already Dead: The New Time of Politics, Culture, and Illness, Duke Univ. Press, 2012.

Doringer, B., ed. FACELESS, De Gruyter / Edition Universität für Angewandte Kunst, 2017.

Fürst, P. ‘Who is watching us? – Datenschutz als Kunst’, Diplomarbeit, Theaterwissenschaft, Universität Wien, 2008.

Gade, R., & Gunhild, B., eds. Performing Archives/ Archives of Performance, Museum Tusculanum Press, 2012.

Guertin, C. Digital Prohibition Piracy and Authorship in New Media Art, Continuum, 2012.

Joseph-Hunter, G. Transmission Arts, PAJ Publications, 2011.

Medosch, A. Freie Netze, Heise Verlag, 2003.

Moulon, D. Art Contemporain Nouveaux Médias, Nouvelles éditions Scala, 2011.

O’Rourke, K. Walking and Mapping: Artists as Cartographers, MIT Press, 2013.

Östlind, N., Vujanovic, D., & Wolthers, L., eds. WATCHED! Surveillance, Art and Photography, Walther König Verlag, 2016. Hasselblad Foundation

Patel, M. ‘A Brief History of Real Time’. Creating Insecurity, edited by Wolfgang Sützl, Plymouth University / Autonomedia, 2009.

Piper, A. Book Was There: Reading in Electronic Times, University of Chicago Press, 2012.

Pold, S. ‘Faceless - Manu Luksch’. ENTER ACTION - Digital Art Now, edited by P. Dinesen, A. Løssing, A. Witzke, & G. Ørskou, ARoS, 2009.

Pold, S. ‘Overvågningens kunst. Overvågningsdystopier og interfacebegær i det urbane rum i Nineteen Eighty-Four, Faceless og andre urbane interfaces’. Overvågning - perspektiver, studier, praksis, edited by P. Lauritsen & F. Olesen, Aarhus Universitetsforlag, 2009.

Vykoukal, M. Neither Shoreditch nor Manhattan. Black Country creative advantage. Multistory, 2011.

Zeilinger, M. ‘Art and Politics of Appropriation’. PhD thesis. Centre for Comparative Literature, University of Toronto, 2009.

Zeilinger, M. (2011). ‘Appropriation and the authoring function of surveillance in Manu Luksch's Faceless. Eyes Everywhere. The Global Growth of Camera Surveillance edited by A. Doyle, R. Lippert, & D. Lyon, Routledge, 2011, pp. 262–73.
