= Adalbert Pilch =

Austrian artist (1917–2004)

Adalbert Pilch (16 February 1917 in Vienna, Austria – 10 December 2004 in Tulln) was an Austrian painter and graphic artist.

The works of Adalbert Pilch include paintings, drawings and illustrations. He became well known for designing postage stamps.

== Life ==
In 1937, after graduating from school, Pilch took up studies at the Academy of Fine Arts Vienna in the master class of Wilhelm Dachauer, with whom he was close friends until his death. From 1940 to 1945 he was enlisted and was at first deployed to Russia. Later he was sent to Lapland, Italy, Greece, and Yugoslavia as a painter for the German war museums. He married in 1942.

In 1945, after the end of the Second World War, Pilch started illustrating newspapers and was consulted for collaboration on textbooks and murals. He created more than 4,000 illustrations for children's and young adult's books and textbooks. Secondary, he worked on the appraisal of old farmhouses, hammer mills, mills, and saw mills by order of the Federal Museum of Lower Austria. He portrayed former and acting Federal Presidents of Austria, as well as Presidents of the National Council, Traffic Ministers, and Director Generals of the postal service. He devised 200 drawings for the War Museum at Vienna.

From 1950 on he was a member of the Vienna Künstlerhaus. In 1953 he received public attention due to a special exhibition of approximately 50 of his works, while in 1956 he got the first order for designing Austrian stamps.

His "Hunting Series" (1959), the Europe Stamp (1960), the series "Olympia 1963" and "UPU 1964", as well as the commemorative stamp "Die Kunst der Donauschule" (The Art of the Danube School; 1965) got international acknowledgment. During his life, Pilch designed 318 stamps for the Austrian post, 30 for the Principality of Liechtenstein and one stamp for Israel. The stamp he created in 1965, "Die Kunst der Donauschule", was elected the "most beautiful stamp of the world".

In 1968 Pilch moved to Mauerbach near Vienna. In 1970 he was promoted to Professor. He displayed his opus at several exhibitions until 2000. Pilch spent his last year of life in the nursing home Theresiaheim in Tulln.

== Honours ==
- Austrian Cross of Honour for Science and Art
- Gold Medal of Honour of the Land of Vienna
- Silver Medal of the city of Vienna
- Gold Decoration for Services to the province of Lower Austria
