= Faceless (2007 film) =

- Directed by: Manu Luksch
- Written by: Manu Luksch, Mukul Patel
- Produced by: Ambient Information Systems, Amour Fou Filmproduktion
- Starring: Manu Luksch, William Trevitt, Aadam K. Ahmed
- Narrated by: Tilda Swinton
- Edited by: Manu Luksch
- Music by: Mukul, Rupert Huber
- Distributed by: Ambient Information Systems, sixpack film
- Release date: 2007
- Running time: 50 minutes
- Countries: Austria; United Kingdom
- Language: English

Faceless is a 2007 Austrian/British science-fiction film directed by Manu Luksch that is constructed entirely from CCTV surveillance camera images, obtained under European data protection legislation. It is part of what film theorist Elizabeth Cowie describes as a 'multi-platform project that [Luksch] developed between 2002 and 2008, exploring London as "the most surveilled city on earth"'.

== Plot summary ==
In a society is governed by the New Machine, individuals have lost their faces, and the RealTime calendar has destroyed their understanding of history or the future. A woman (the protagonist, played by Luksch) wakes up one day to discover she has a face; subsequently, she receives an anonymous letter that reveals the existence of her past life, and her child. Panicking, she enlists the help of Spectral Children to evade Overseers and confront the authority of the New Machine. In the film's ambivalent conclusion, she appears to defeat the New Machine by unveiling the power of the human face and recovering temporality.

== Cast ==
- Tilda Swinton as narrator
- Manu Luksch as She
- William Trevitt as He
- Aadam K. Ahmed as Their Child

== Production ==
=== Material and process ===
Faceless is constructed entirely from surveillance camera images that Luksch obtained over several years by exercising her rights under the UK Data Protection Act 1998. The film was made under Luksch's Manifesto for CCTV Filmmakers, and its scenario (of a world populated by faceless individuals) and plot derive from the legal and material properties of these images. The filmmaker performed on London streets under CCTV cameras, then sent formal letters to the relevant camera operators demanding a copy of any recordings in which she appeared. The operators were obliged to supply copies after anonymising third parties in the images by redacting their faces, in return for a statutory fee of £10. On account of this accompanying legal superstructure, Luksch describes these images as 'legal readymades'. Christian Andersen and Søren Bro Pold note that, in the process of obtaining CCTV material, "Luksch took advantage of the legal framework around rights to individual data."

The production process stretched over several years, since the acquisition of images under the Data Protection Act proceeded extremely slowly – many of the data requests were met with negative responses, as 'either the surveillance camera, or the recorder, or the entire CCTV system in question was not operational.' Andersen and Pold note that 'in its exploitation of the mechanisms of surveillance, the film expresses a strong criticism of not just the legal framework around visual surveillance but also how it is handled in everyday practice.'

=== Soundtrack ===
Faceless has no spoken dialogue – a natural consequence of the prohibition of audio surveillance in the UK. Instead, the story is told by a voice-over narrator. The film's soundtrack is almost entirely non-diegetic, comprising electronic and industrial elements composed in 5.1 surround sound to bring depth to the flat, wide-angle CCTV images, contrasted with predominantly stereophonic solo piano recordings by Rupert Huber.

== Critical analysis and interpretation ==
=== Form and aesthetics ===
In his essay 'Within the apparatus of control. On the enduring fascination of surveillance aesthetics', Roland Schöny observes that the visual aesthetic of Faceless 'stems from the spatial apparatus of technical surveillance via the eye of the camera, [and is] reminiscent of early forms of video art. The images seem to stem from the past future (...) A constantly flickering image, colour distortion and fragmented sequences, complete with a visible time-code, are all significant elements in this semantic code.' Moreover, 'attention is focused just as much on bustling areas, like underground stations or shopping malls, as on lonely car parks, underground garages or the parched periphery of housing estates, not to mention office premises or lobbies.' Andersen and Pold also remark on the perspective of the surveillance camera aimed at 'capturing as much of reality as possible, in contrast to the subjective camera conventionally used in films.'

Several commentators have noted that Luksch's film pays evident homage to Chris Marker's 1962 film La Jetée in its visual pacing and linguistic style. Eric Cazdyn, Professor of Aesthetics and Politics at the University of Toronto, remarks on the two films' complementarity: 'In La Jetée we have a single temporality occurring at different times, while in Faceless we have different temporalities occurring at the same time.' Another influence on Faceless is evident in the ensemble dance sequences, which draw on the kaleidoscopic choreography of Busby Berkeley's musicals.

Whereas Schöny summarises Faceless as a 'poetic narrative on the disappearance of history and identity in the panoptic era,' the writer and producer Robert Buchschwenter characterises it more forcefully as a traumatising 'metanarrative of a society whose self-understanding is occluded by its dazzling media hyperpresence.'

=== Filmmaking as détournement ===
Luksch uses the term 'tactical fiction' to describe an approach that hybridizes documentary and fiction to interrogate infrastructure and provoke reflection. Elizabeth Cowie remarks that the film is both 'an actual reality of the ordinary spaces of the city [...], and a fictional world' Through its manifesto-driven legal process, Faceless bridges fact and fiction and accomplishes a détournement, or activist hijacking of the surveillance apparatus. Art and communication scholar Margarida Carvalho locates the work's force in its diversion of CCTV networks 'from their explicit purpose [...], endowing them with an experimental, artistic and activist dimension. [...The] city is transformed into a permanent film set and the act of creation becomes a gesture of appropriation and transformation of the omnipresent gaze of the surveillance cameras. In this context to create is to affectively populate a territory, to rescue it from the barrenness and lethargy in which the non-reciprocated gaze of the surveillance cameras had plunged it.' Carvalho further suggests that the film's ensemble dance sequences express a 'strangeness and poetic activism, evoking the contradictory forces that connect us to the spaces we so often cross and forget to inhabit.'

== Release ==
Since its festival release in 2007, Faceless continues to be shown regularly in film and art contexts. Notable public screenings include the Diagonale film festival, Graz and Goodbye Privacy at Ars Electronica, Linz in 2007; Planète Marker at Centre Georges Pompidou, Paris, Urban Wandering at the Barbican Centre, London and Momentum: Women/Art/Technology at the Whitney Museum of American Art, New York in 2013; and Watched! at the Hasselblad Foundation, Göteborg in 2016.

=== Home media ===
The film is published via online streaming service Flimmit and as a DVD with additional features, subtitles in Albanian, Bulgarian, Czech, English, French, German, Italian and Spanish, and a Dolby surround 5.1 soundtrack.

=== Public collections ===
Faceless is included in the collections of the Centre Georges Pompidou and the BFI National Archive
