= Wilhelm Dachauer =

Austrian artist (1881–1951)

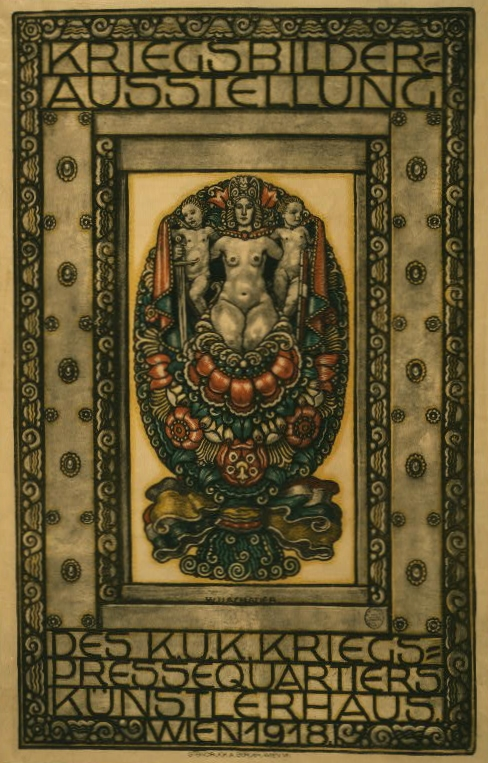
Poster by Dachauer for an exhibit of war images at the Vienna Künstlerhaus in 1918

Wilhelm Dachauer (5 April 1881 – 26 February 1951) was an Austrian painter. He studied at the Akademie der bildenden Künste in Vienna from 1899 to 1907 and was a professor at the academy from 1928 to 1944.

== Life ==
Dachauer was in Ried im Innkreis on 5 April 1881 into a family of clockmakers. He was intended to continue his father's business but after some struggle, he was allowed to move to Vienna, where he had a time full of privations. He started an apprenticeship as decoration painter and in the nighttime he prepared for the Academy of Applied Arts. In 1899, 17-year-old Dachauer began his studies under the supervision of Professor Griepenkerl.

In 1913, he had his first arguably successful exhibition at the Secession. He was appointed to an honored professorship of the Akademie der bildenden Künste (Academy of Fine Arts) in Vienna in 1928, a position that he occupied until 1944. Temporarily, he was rector of the institution. Among his students were Hildegard Joos, Maria Lassnig, Adalbert Pilch, and Peppino Wieternik (1919–1979).

He was one of the founders and leaders of the Federation of German Painters, Austrian branch (Bund Deutscher Maler Österreichs), which from 1937 sought to bring together painters with National Socialist sympathies. Dachauer joined the Nazi party in July 1938. A Committee of Inquiry after the end of World War 2 found him not guilty of serving the Nazis through his work, however he was never reinstated to his post at the Academy of Fine Arts.

Dachauer died in Vienna on 26 February 1951.

== Opus ==
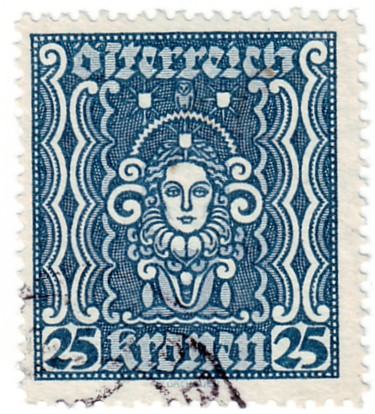
Jugendstil stamp design, "Art", 1922

Dachauer was initially influenced by the art of the Secession and later developed a form of realism that was strongly dedicated to rural and regional arts. This style fitted well to the "official" taste of the Ständestaat and the National Socialist regime, so his work became somewhat disreputable after 1945.

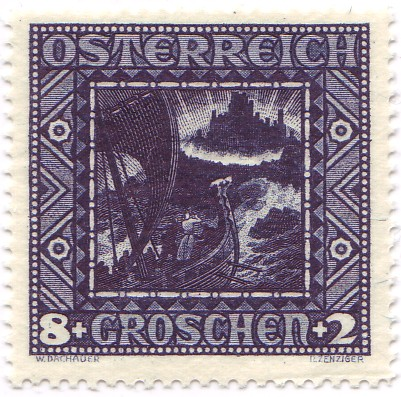
The award-winning stamp of the Nibelungen-set, 1926, Austria Nr. 489

He was rather unconsciously known to the public by the design of some stamp series than for his other paintings. Among his stamp designs are the well-known set of the Nibelungen motifs and the inventor set; other motifs are: Stille Nacht and Johann Strauß.

In 1926, Dachauer was awarded the Thomson medal for the most beautiful stamp in the world for the second stamp of the before mentioned Nibelungen set. The design of this stamp has the title "Gunters Drachenschiff auf dem Weg nach Island" (Gunter's Dragon Boat on the Way to Iceland). This stamp has a nominal value of 8+2 g (Groschen).

After the annexation of Austria to the German Reich and the occupation of Poland, Dachauer designed several other stamps of the so-called Generalgouvernement and a few of the German Reich. He also made the designs for several Austrian stamps after World War II, among them the so-called Homecomer series.

Ten glass windows and one altarpiece of the Franziskaner hospital chapel in Ried 1928 are designs of Dachauer. More conserved works are the portraits of Julius Wagner-Jauregg and Viktor Kaplan.

Nowadays a street—the Wilhelm-Dachauer Straße in Essling, the 22nd borough of Vienna—is named after Dachauer.

== Literature ==
Wilhelm Dachauer, Gemälde und Briefmarken, Österr. Bundesverlag, Vienna 1963.
