= Martin Reinhart =

Martin Reinhart (born 27 November 1967 in Vienna) is an Austrian experimental filmmaker, media artist and academic. He is Senior Lecturer in the master's programme Art & Science at the University of Applied Arts Vienna.

== Life and work ==
Reinhart studied art education and design education at the University of Applied Arts Vienna, graduating with distinction under Daniela Hammer-Tugendhat. He additionally trained as a film technician in Munich and Hollywood.

He worked as curator for photography and film at the Vienna Technical Museum and founded Indiecam, a company for digital film technology.

Since the 1990s, Reinhart has been active as an experimental filmmaker, media artist and researcher at the intersection of art, technology and science. He gained international attention with the documentary Dreams Rewired (2015), which reassembles archival footage to trace a media history of the 20th century.

Together with Virgil Widrich, he created the short films tx-transform (1998), tx-reverse (2019) and tx-reverse 360° (2019), which were screened at international festivals including the Sundance Film Festival. Their interactive installation tx-mirror (2018) was shown at the ZKM Center for Art and Media Karlsruhe.

Reinhart also led international artistic research projects funded by the Austrian Science Fund (FWF), including Data Loam (2017–2019) and Radical Matter (2021–2024), both of which explored alternative knowledge systems and digital intelligence in the arts.

== Filmography and works (selection) ==
- 1995/2000: Pinocchio (short film)
- 1998: tx-transform (short film, with Virgil Widrich)
- 2012: Revolution in Sound (documentary, with Thomas Tode)
- 2015: Dreams Rewired (documentary, with Manu Luksch and Thomas Tode)
- 2018: tx-mirror (interactive installation, with Virgil Widrich)
- 2019: tx-reverse (short film, with Virgil Widrich)
- 2019: tx-reverse 360° (short film, with Virgil Widrich)
- 2020: Constant Ride (short film, screened at Vienna Shorts)

== Style and themes ==
Reinhart’s work combines media archaeology, the history of technology and artistic research. He explores the relationships between time, space and perception in film and develops new representational forms, such as the “reversal” of cinematic image spaces in the tx projects. His artistic research investigates how artistic, scientific and technological processes intersect in contemporary media art.

== Teaching ==
Reinhart has taught at the University of Vienna, the University of Art and Design Linz and as a guest lecturer at the Royal College of Art in London. Since 2021 he has been a Senior Lecturer in the master's programme Art & Science at the University of Applied Arts Vienna.
