= Erich Prem =

- Born: Salzburg, Austria
- Education: TU Wien; University of Vienna
- Occupations: Computer scientist, researcher

Erich Prem is an Austrian computer scientist, philosopher, and AI expert known for his contributions to embodied artificial intelligence, epistemology, and the field of digital humanism. He was a researcher at the University of Vienna's Department of Philosophy and at the Technical University of Vienna. He is the founder and CEO of the technology strategy consultancy eutema.

== Life and career ==
Prem was born in Salzburg, Austria. He studied computer science at TU Wien, where he received both his Diplom-Ingenieur and Doctor of Technical Sciences degrees. He later also received a Doctor of Philosophy in epistemology from the University of Vienna, and an MBA from Donau-Universitat Krems. In 1995, Prem was a visiting scholar at the MIT Computer Science and Artificial Intelligence Laboratory.

He began his research career at the Austrian Research Institute for Artificial Intelligence (OFAI), where his early work focused on neural networks, autonomous systems, embodied artificial intelligence, and the symbol grounding problem. His research examined how artificial systems can acquire meaningful symbols through sensory-motor interaction with their environment and explored the epistemological implications of embodied intelligence.

From 1999 to 2001, he headed the ICT Unit at the Bureau for International Research and Technology Co-operation (BIT) in Vienna.

In 2001, Prem founded eutema GmbH, a research and technology consultancy in Vienna. Through eutema, he has worked on research, technology, and innovation policy, including strategic roadmapping, open science, and innovation management in information and communication technologies. He has advised European and national institutions on research and technological development strategies.

From 2006 to 2011, he taught cognitive science at the University of Vienna. Since 2012, he has lectured at TU Wien. In 2021, he joined the Department of Philosophy at the University of Vienna as a postdoctoral researcher, focusing on epistemological and ethical aspects of artificial intelligence.

Prem's work has focused on artificial intelligence, philosophy of technology, and innovation policy. He has examined risks associated with entrepreneurial AI, algorithmic content moderation, and regulatory approaches to artificial intelligence. He has authored or co-authored more than seventy scientific papers and book chapters on artificial intelligence, epistemology, and innovation policy. He co-edited Perspectives on Digital Humanism (2021) and contributed to Introduction to Digital Humanism (2024). He authored From Ethical AI Frameworks to Tools (2023) and A Knowledge-Based Perspective of Strategic AI Innovation Management (2022) and Managing Entrepreneurial AI Ethics Risks (2025). Prem's work has appeared in journals such as AI and Ethics, Communications of the ACM, Leonardo, Science and Public Policy, and Cybernetics and Systems.

He is a co-founder and chair of the Association for the Promotion of Digital Humanism.
