= Rebecca Morrill =

Rebecca Morrill is a British curator, editor, and arts writer.

She is Executive Commissioning Editor at HENI Publishing and was previously Commissioning Editor for Art Surveys at Phaidon Press from 2013 to 2023, where she edited and wrote the introductory essay for Great Women Artists (2019), described by British Vogue as "the headline grabber of 2019".

She previously held curatorial roles at the Serpentine Gallery and the Whitechapel Gallery, both in London.

== Education ==
Morrill studied History of Art and Architecture at the University of East Anglia, where she completed both an undergraduate degree and a master's degree in Museology (with Distinction).

== Career ==
=== Whitechapel Gallery (1999–2004) ===
Morrill joined the Whitechapel Gallery in 1999, where she held roles in both the exhibitions and communications departments. As Exhibition Organiser (2002–2004), she worked on solo presentations by Paul Noble, Franz West, Cristina Iglesias, and Rodney Graham, and contributed to catalogue and limited edition production. She also launched and managed the Whitechapel Gallery's first website.

=== Serpentine Gallery (2004–2009) ===
Morrill worked at the Serpentine Gallery, London, for five years as Exhibition Curator. In this role she co-curated exhibitions with the Gallery's directors, including:

- Indian Highway (a major survey of contemporary Indian art)
- Gerhard Richter
- Maria Lassnig
- Anthony McCall
- Damien Hirst's murderme collection

She also served as Project Organiser on three editions of the annual Serpentine Pavilion architecture commission and oversaw the editing and production of accompanying exhibition catalogues.

=== AV Festival (2009–2013) ===
Following her time at the Serpentine, Morrill worked as Producer at the AV Festival, a biennial festival of art, film, music, and digital culture based in the North East of England. The festival, which ran from 2002 to 2018, was internationally recognised as one of the UK's leading platforms for time-based and digital art. She produced the 10th and 12th editions of the festival.

She also served as Head of Collector Development (North East) at the Contemporary Art Society during this period.

=== Phaidon Press (2013–2023) ===
Morrill joined Phaidon Press in 2013 as Senior Editor before becoming Commissioning Editor for Art Surveys, a role she held for a decade. In this capacity she commissioned and edited a wide range of survey publications on modern and contemporary art, including:

- The 21st Century Art Book (2014)
- Painting Beyond Pollock by Morgan Falconer (2015)
- Akademie X: Lessons in Art + Life (2015)
- Body of Art (Phaidon Editors)
- Great Women Artists (2019)
- Great Women Artists: Compact Format (2023)

==== Great Women Artists (2019) ====
Great Women Artists, published by Phaidon in October 2019, is the most extensive fully illustrated survey of women artists ever published. The book features over 400 artists from more than 50 countries, spanning 500 years, and was conceived and edited by Morrill. She also wrote the book's introductory essay, which situates the publication within the history of feminist art historiography, referencing Linda Nochlin's landmark 1971 essay "Why Have There Been No Great Women Artists?" and surveying five centuries of structural exclusion and recovery.

The book's title, which features a typographic strikethrough over the word "women," was conceived by Phaidon's publisher Deborah Aaronson as a visual acknowledgement of the contested nature of gender-based categorisation: asserting that these artists are "great artists," while recognising that gender-specific framing remains a necessary corrective while parity has not been achieved.

The long list for the book began at approximately 2,000 artists. The final selection of 400+ was developed by Morrill in collaboration with a panel of freelance contributors.

Great Women Artists received widespread critical attention on publication. British Vogue named it "the headline grabber of 2019." Interview Magazine wrote that it redressed the gender imbalance in art historical canon. The Times Literary Supplement described it as offering "a panoramic sweep" with "formal analyses intertwined with introductions to key art-historical, social and political themes. The book was subsequently issued in a compact edition in 2023.

=== HENI Publishing (2023–present) ===
Morrill joined HENI Publishing as Executive Commissioning Editor in 2023, following the conclusion of her decade at Phaidon.

== Selected publications ==
- Morrill, Rebecca (ed.). Great Women Artists. London: Phaidon Press, 2019. ISBN 9780714878775.
- Morrill, Rebecca (ed.). Great Women Artists: Compact Format. London: Phaidon Press, 2023. ISBN 9781837291434.
- Phaidon Editors (ed. Morrill, Rebecca). Body of Art. London: Phaidon Press.
- Phaidon Editors. The 21st Century Art Book. London: Phaidon Press, 2014. (editor)
- Falconer, Morgan. Painting Beyond Pollock. London: Phaidon Press, 2015. (editor)
- Morrill, Rebecca (ed,.) Sanaa Serpentine Gallery Pavilion, 2009
