= Critical Practice (art) =

Critical Practice is a discipline of art that places an equal emphasis on theory and practice, adopting an invigorated methodology that considers and interrogates the processes of art making, its changing contexts and the ways in which it engages an audience. In addition to the various forces that are implicated in the making of art, the research elements pursued under the auspices of Critical Practice engage the increasingly devolved experience of art, made available through art institutions to their audiences.

Critical Practice work takes a range of forms from traditional wall-based work (collage, drawing, photography) through performance and video, from relational and socially engaged practices to site-specific installations.

Studies in Critical Practice are offered at several universities, including the Royal College of Art, University of the Arts London, University of Brighton, and Yale University.
