= Fast Film (film) =

- Directed by: Virgil Widrich
- Written by: Virgil Widrich (writer)
- Produced by: Philippe Bober (co-producer); Alexander Dumreicher-Ivanceanu (co-producer); Gabriele Kranzelbinder (co-producer); Bady Minck (producer); Nicolas Schmerkin (co-producer); Virgil Widrich (producer)
- Cinematography: Martin Putz
- Edited by: Virgil Widrich
- Release date: 2003
- Running time: 14 minutes
- Countries: Austria; Germany; Luxembourg

Fast Film is a 2003 Austrian-Luxembourgish film directed by Virgil Widrich.

== Plot summary ==
An homage to action films, it tells the story of a chase using scraps of other films as different types of animation (using 65,000 paper printouts of images from 400 live action films) illustrate a classic chase scene scenario: A woman is abducted and a man comes to her rescue, but during their escape they find themselves in the enemy's secret headquarters.

== Films featured on Fast Film ==
- Carnival of Souls (1962)
- Charade (1963)
- Raiders of the Lost Ark (1981)
- Singin' in the Rain (1952)
- North By Northwest (1959)
- The General (1926)
- Ben-Hur (1959)
- Gone with the Wind (1939)
- Psycho (1960)
- The Wild Bunch (1969)
- The Man Who Knew Too Much (1956)
- Bride of Frankenstein (1935)
- The Time Machine (1960)
- Dr. Strangelove (1964)
- Midnight Cowboy (1969)
- Jason and the Argonauts (1963)
- Creature from the Black Lagoon (1954)
- Videodrome (1983)
- 20,000 Leagues Under the Sea (1954)
- To Catch a Thief (1955)
- The Great Race (1965)
- Breathless (1960)
- The Maltese Falcon (1941)
- Vertigo (1958)
- Sunset Boulevard (1950)
- House of Wax (1953)
- Forbidden Planet (1956)

== Accolades ==
The film was nominated for a Palme d'Or for Best Short Film at the 2003 Cannes Film Festival.

It was also part of the Animation Show of Shows.
