= Uppsala International Short Film Festival =

Annual film festival held in Uppsala, Sweden

- Location: Uppsala, Sweden
- Founded: 1982
- Awards: "Uppsala Grand Prix" and "Uppsala Film Jackdaw for Best Children's Film"
- Website: Uppsala International Short Film Festival web page

Uppsala International Short Film Festival is an annual festival hosted in Uppsala, Sweden since 1982. As of 2002 the winner of the award "Uppsala Grand Prix" and the winner of the Uppsala Film Jackdaw for Best Children's Film are eligible for an Academy Award nomination. The Uppsala International Short Film Festival, Sweden's premier arena for short film, shows more than 300 short films along with lectures and seminars that give an insight into Swedish film, culture, and history. Swedish and international filmmakers and other professionals attend.

== Award winners ==
Uppsala Grand Prix is the main award of the festival.

Year	Title	Director	Country
1999	El paraíso perdido / Paradise Lost	Jaime Marques	Spain
2000	Home	Morag McKinnon	United Kingdom
2001	La pomme, la figue et l'amande / The Apple, the Fig and the Almond	Joël Brisse	France
2002	Comme un seul homme / All for one	Jean-Louis Gonnet	France
2003	Fast Film	Virgil Widrich	Austria
2004	Russelltribunalen / The Russell Tribunal	Staffan Lamm	Sweden
2005	El otro sueño americano	Enrique Arroyo	Mexico
2006	Medianeras	Gustavo Taretto	Argentina
2007	Lampa cu căciulă / The Tube with a Hat	Radu Jude	Romania
2008	Jos Kaadun / If I Fall	Hannaleena Hauru	Finland
2009	Elefantenhaut	Severin Fiala and Ulrike Putzer	Austria
2010	Colivia / The Cage	Adrian Sitaru	Romania
2011	Miten marjoja poimitaan / How to Pick Berries	Elina Talvensaari	Finland
2012	Chefu’	Adrian Sitaru	Romania
2013	Khaterate Enghelabe Bahman Asheghe Leila / Revolutionary memories of Bahman who loved Leila	Farahnaz Sharifi	Iran
2014	Mondial 2010	Roy Dib	Lebanon
2015	Over	Jörn Threlfall	United Kingdom
2016	Univitellin	Terence Nance	France
2017	Wednesdays with Goddard	Nicolas Ménard	United Kingdom
2018	(Fool Time) Job	Gilles Cuvelier	France
2019	Blessed Land	Phạm Ngọc Lân	Vietnam
2020	Have a Nice Dog	Jalal Maghout	Germany/Syria
2021	Noir-Soleil	Marie Larrivé	France
