= Yana Zhdanova =

Ukrainian feminist and social activist (born 1988)

Yana Zhdanova Яна Жданова
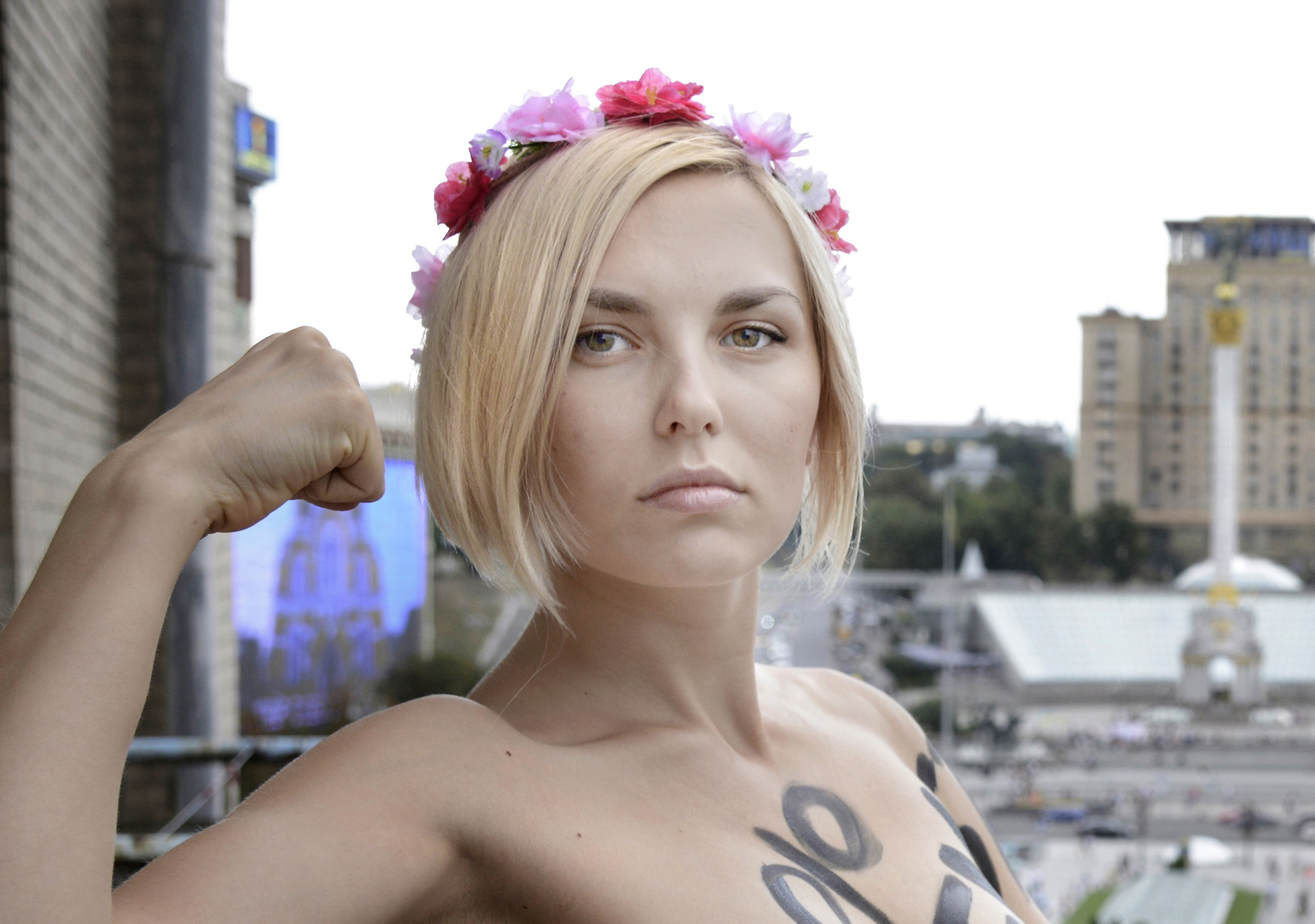
- Zhdanova at the Maidan Nezalezhnosti in Kyiv in August 2013
- Born: 28 February 1988 (age 38); Makiivka, Ukrainian SSR, Soviet Union
- Education: University of Culture and Arts, Kyiv, Ukraine
- Occupation: Activist
- Years active: 2009–present

Iana (Yana) Zhdanova (Ukrainian: Яна Жданова; born 28 February 1988) is a Ukrainian feminist and social activist who since the 2000s has been a leading member of the radical feminist protest group FEMEN. The movement became known for organizing controversial bare-breasted protests against inequality between men and women, prostitution, sex industry, dictatorship, homophobia and other political and social issues.

== Early life ==
Zhdanova was born in Makiivka, then part of the Ukrainian SSR. After attending schools in Makiivka and Donetsk, she attended the Kyiv National University of Culture and Arts in Kyiv. She graduated in 2009 with a Bachelor's degree, and in 2010 received a Master's degree in History of Culture. From 2009 to 2012, she worked as a dancer in small theatres and nightclubs in Kyiv, while art, like literature and architecture, remains a precious component of her life.

== Activism ==
In 2008, Zhdanova was working as a correspondent for the daily national Ukrainian newspaper Life. At that time, she started participating in feminist activism with Alexandra Shevchenko. Zhdanova's first public protest with Femen took place on 22 March 2009 targeting Ukrainian writer Oles Buzina, due to conflict of opinion on his 2009 book publication in fiction category. The author is asserting in this book that women's real place is in a harem, like in old times.

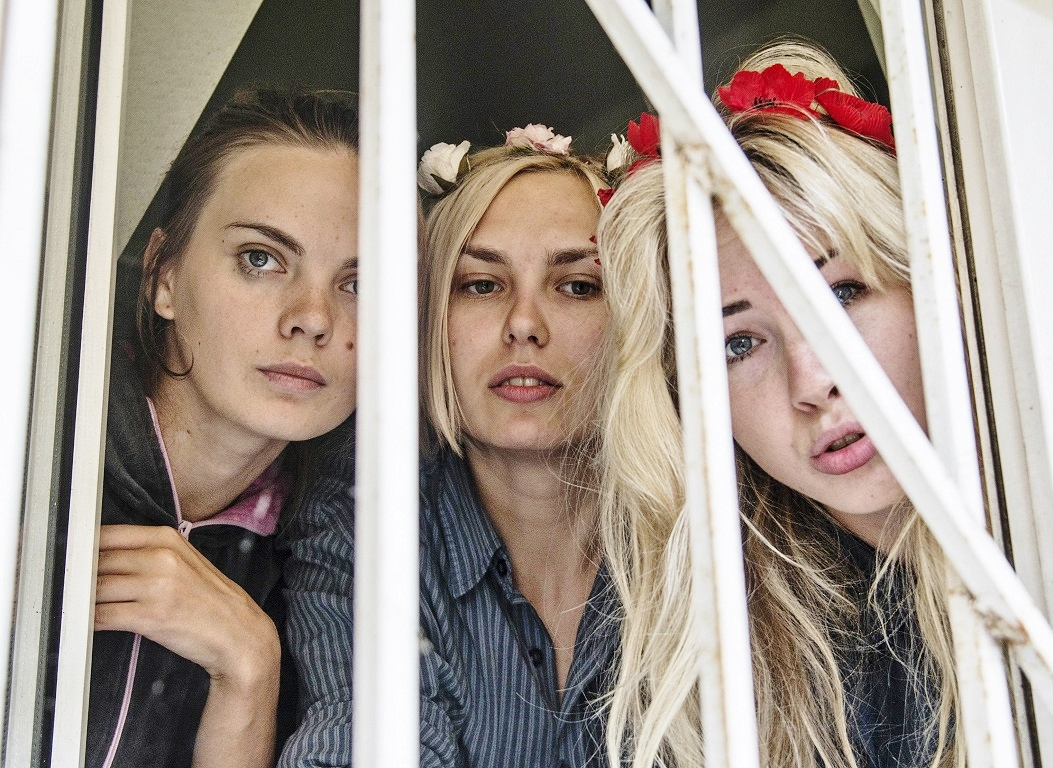
Zhdanova (center) with Oksana Shachko (left) and Sasha Shevchenko at the Courthouse of Kyiv on 28 July 2013

On 23 May 2009, Zhdanova, along with Alexandra (Sasha) Shevchenko, Oksana Shachko and Inna Shevchenko, took part in a protest in Kyiv with the slogan "Ukraine is not a brothel" because, according to their perception, an increasing number of young Ukrainian women were earning money through sex tourism and prostitution.

On 8 March 2012, she participated in a protest in Istanbul, Turkey, during the International Women's Day with the slogan "Stop domestic violence". After being arrested by the Turkish police, the next day she was expelled from the country.

In March 2012, she protested in Kyiv on the top of office building of the Prosecutor General of Ukraine for the Makar case which garnered extensive massive media coverage inside and outside Ukraine: three young Ukrainians who had raped, strangled, set alight, and left to die Makar aged 18, were released by the police, waiting for their trial. The slogan of the protest was "Oksana still alive".

In April 2012, she participated in an action by climbing up on the bell tower of the Saint-Sophia cathedral in Kyiv, and by ringing the bells, as a protest against a law project on prohibiting abortion. The slogan was "Give birth, [it is] not for you".

On 1 July 2012, she protested in front of the Kyiv Olympic Stadium against the arrival of Belarusian President Alexander Lukashenko with the slogan "Respect, KGB, UEFA".

In April 2013, she participated in a protest in front of the Kyiv mosque for Amina Tyler with the slogan "Free Amina". Tyler, a young Tunisian, had been arrested after painting "FEMEN" on a Kairouan cemetery wall in an anti-Ansar al-Sharia protest, and posting an online photograph of herself nude from the waist up. At the same time a fatwa was issued by an imam against her to be stoned to death.

On 18 June 2013, she protested in Kyiv against the visit of Alexander Lukashenko, on account of Lukashenko's self-described authoritarian style of government in Belarus, even referring to himself as Europe's "last dictator". The slogan of the Femen protest was "Stop Dictator".

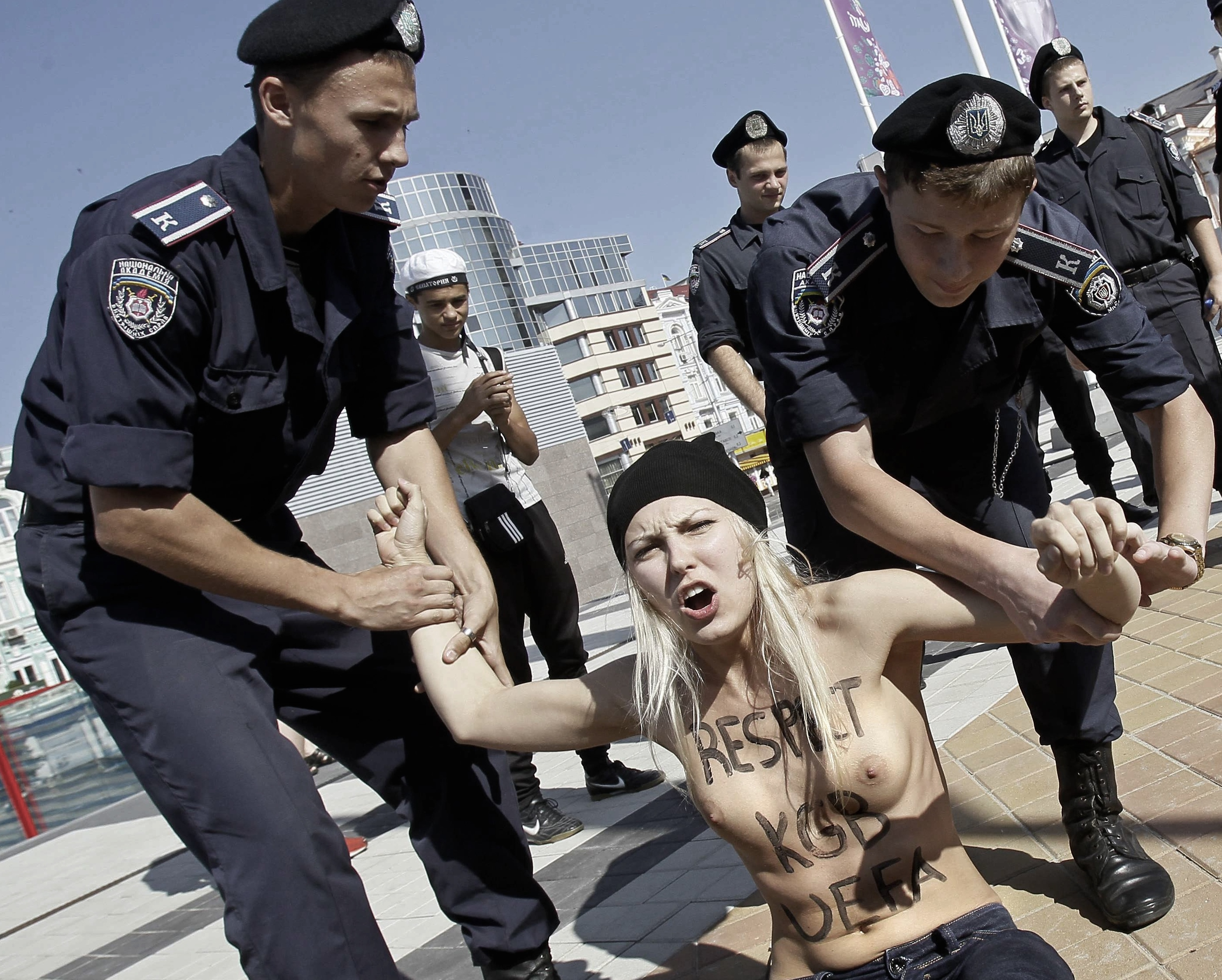
Zhdanova protesting against Lukashenko in Kyiv on 1 July 2012

On 27 July 2013, Zhdanova along with Sasha Shevchenko, Oksana Shachko, and the photographer Dmitry Kostyukov were arrested in Kyiv before starting their protest against the 1,025th anniversary of Orthodox Christianism in Kyivan Rus'. The group was kept in prison for one day and fined. Femen claimed that the organization was assaulted and wrongfully charged.

The Femen activists decided to close their office in Kyiv, however on 27 August 2013, the Ukrainian police slipped into the office, presented a gun and a grenade that the police said they were hidden there by the Femen group, and arrested Zhdanova, S. Shevchenko and Anna Hutsol. They were released on 29 August, with the obligation to come back to the police station two days later. During these two days of freedom, Yana Zhdanova, Sasha Shevchenko, and Oksana Shachko decided to leave Ukraine and go to France asking for asylum as political refugees. They arrived in Paris on 30 August 2013.

On 26 September 2013, Zhdanova protested on the podium during a Nina Ricci's fashion show in Paris against the fashion industry. The slogans were "Model, don't go to brothel" and "Fashion dictaterror".

On the 1 December 2013, she participated in a protest in front of the Ukrainian embassy in Paris by urinating on photo portraits of Victor Yanukovych, president of Ukraine until February 2014, for his policy regarding other Ukrainian political parties. The slogan was "Yanukovych piss off".

On 21 December 2013, she protested in front of the European Parliament in Brussels against Putin who was in Brussels for the summit between European Union and Russia. The slogan was "Putin is the killer of democracy".

On 25 February 2014, she participated in a protest at the Trocadero square in Paris against the policy of Yulia Tymoshenko, Ukrainian former Prime Minister. The slogan was "Putin's new puppet".

On 12 September 2014, she protested in front of a Mistral-type helicopter carrier at the port of Saint-Nazaire, France, that was about to be delivered to Russia. The slogan was "Fuck you Putin! No Mistrals for you!"

On 6 October 2014, she climbed up on the roof of Moulin Rouge cabaret in Paris celebrating its 125th anniversary to protest against the image cabarets give of women's body. The slogan was "Red is the colour of revolution".

== Political refugee ==
On 12 February 2014, the French government granted to Yana Zdhanova asylum as political refugee. Except the activism along with other members of the Femen group, she has also protested alone in the name of the same principles for equality between men and women. These protests are the following:

On 24 May 2012, she grabbed the trophy of the Euro 2012 football championship in the Ukrainian town of Lviv before being arrested by the guards. The slogan was "Fuck Euro" and the protest was against a sporting event to come the following month the Femen movement stated that it would become the cause of sexual tourism. Zhdanova was put in jail for 5 days in Kyiv.

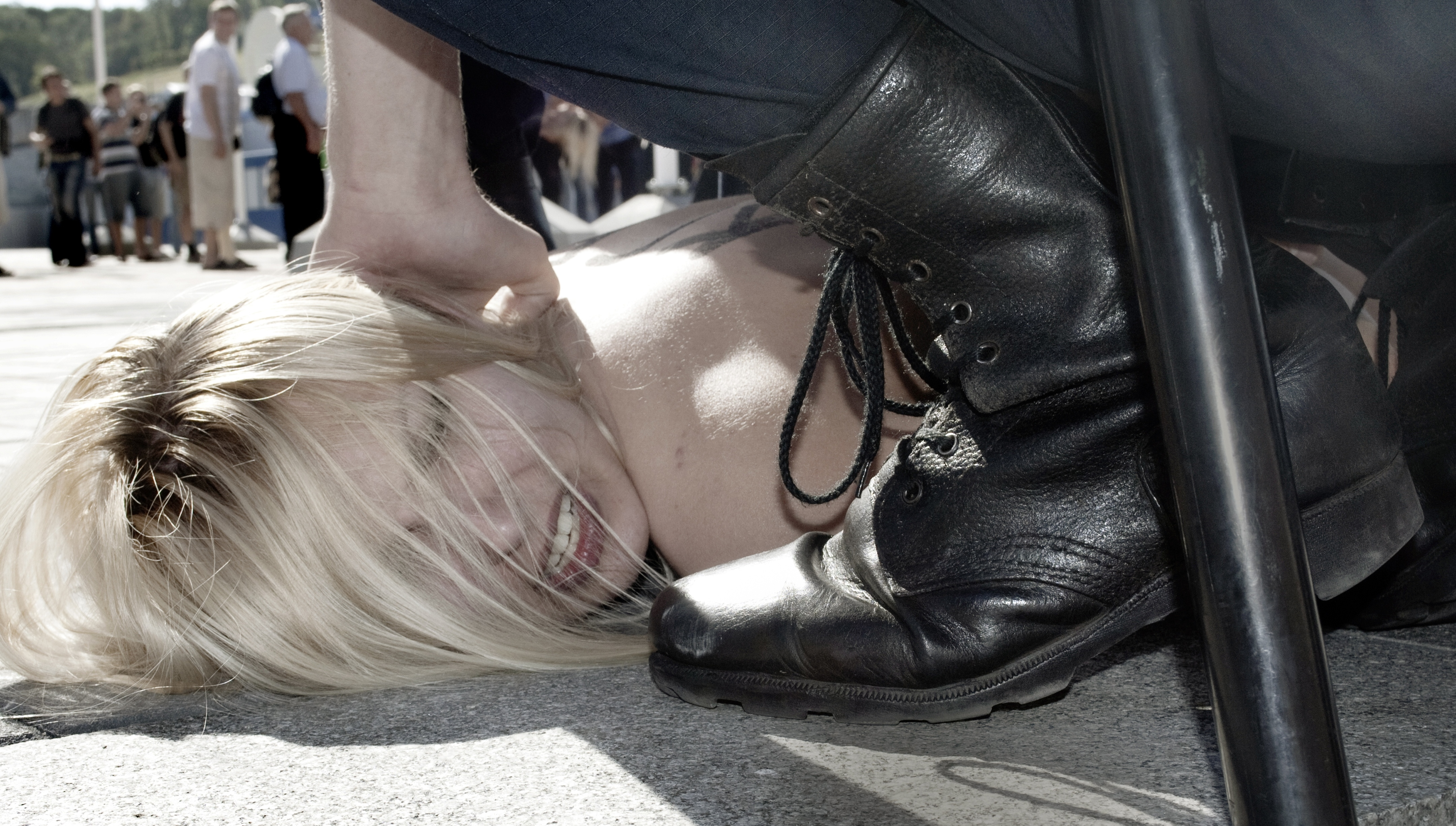
Zhdanova at the Olympiyskaïa Square in Kyiv on the 1 July 2012

On 26 July 2012, she attacked at the airport of Boryspil, Kyiv, the patriarch Kirill of Moscow and all Russia, just arrived for a religious commemoration. The slogan was "Kill Kirill" against the activity of the Eastern Orthodox Church involved into politics. She was arrested and had a 15-days-time spent in prison. It was emphasized that "protesting powerful people was nothing new, but physically confronting them was: Zhdanova's <Kill Kirill> was the first FEMEN's sextremist assault on a powerful man."

On 7 June 2013, she protested near the Russian embassy in Kyiv by creating a choreography as a caricature on Putin's private life.

On 29 November 2013, she protested in Vilnius, capital of Lithuania, during the summit on the cooperation between the European Union and six other countries, former members of the Soviet Union. The president of Ukraine Victor Yanukovych was the only one from the six leaders who did not sign the treaty of cooperation. The slogan of the protest was "Ukraine to EU". She was arrested and kept one day in prison.

On 5 June 2014, she destroyed the Putin's wax statue at the Grevin museum in Paris as a protest for the arrival of the president of Russia the same day in Paris. The slogan was "Kill Putin". The museum sued Zhdanova through a Court proceeding that will become for her a means for struggling against the law on sexual exhibition.

On 25 December 2014, she took away from the nativity scene the statue of baby Jesus at the square of Saint Peter's Basilica in the Vatican City with the slogan "God is woman". The Vatican had the choice of trying Zhdanova in a Vatican court or having her expelled to be tried in an Italian court, but it has been decided to do neither. She spent three days and two nights in the Vatican prison before she was expelled.

On 17 February 2015, she protested in Budapest against Putin's visit to Hungary. The slogan was "Putin go home".

== The Zhdanova jurisprudence and the law on sexual exhibition ==
The consequence of Zhdanova's assault on the Putin's wax statue at the Grevin museum in Paris on 5 June 2014 was that she has been convicted on 15 October 2014 to a €1,500 fine for destruction and sexual exhibition, as well as €3,000 for material prejudice and €1,000 for moral prejudice to be paid to the museum. The defender appealed the decision of the Court and the case was presented before the Court of Appeal on 27 October and 17 November 2016. On 12 January 2017, the Court declared Zhdanova not guilty for sexual exhibition, and she was convicted to a €600 fine for court charges, and €3,000 for the statue and €1,000 for moral damage to be paid to the Grévin museum. However, the general prosecutor of the Court of Appeal did not agree that the defender was declared not guilty for sexual exhibition and he appealed the decision before the Court of Cassation, the supreme court over all civil and criminal cases in France to make sure that the law was correctly applied. On 10 January 2018, the Court of Cassation decided that exposing naked breasts in public places is sexual exhibition indeed, but without a reference to the case of Zhdanova. A new appeal of the general prosecutor for convicting the activist was rejected by the Court of Cassation on 26 February 2020, stating that exposing naked breasts in public places is sexual exhibition, nevertheless, convicting Zhdanova for sexual exhibition in this particular case would be a disproportionate interference in her right to freedom of speech and expression, given the strictly political aim of her act. This concluding decision of the Court of Cassation constitutes the Zhdanova jurisprudence in France.

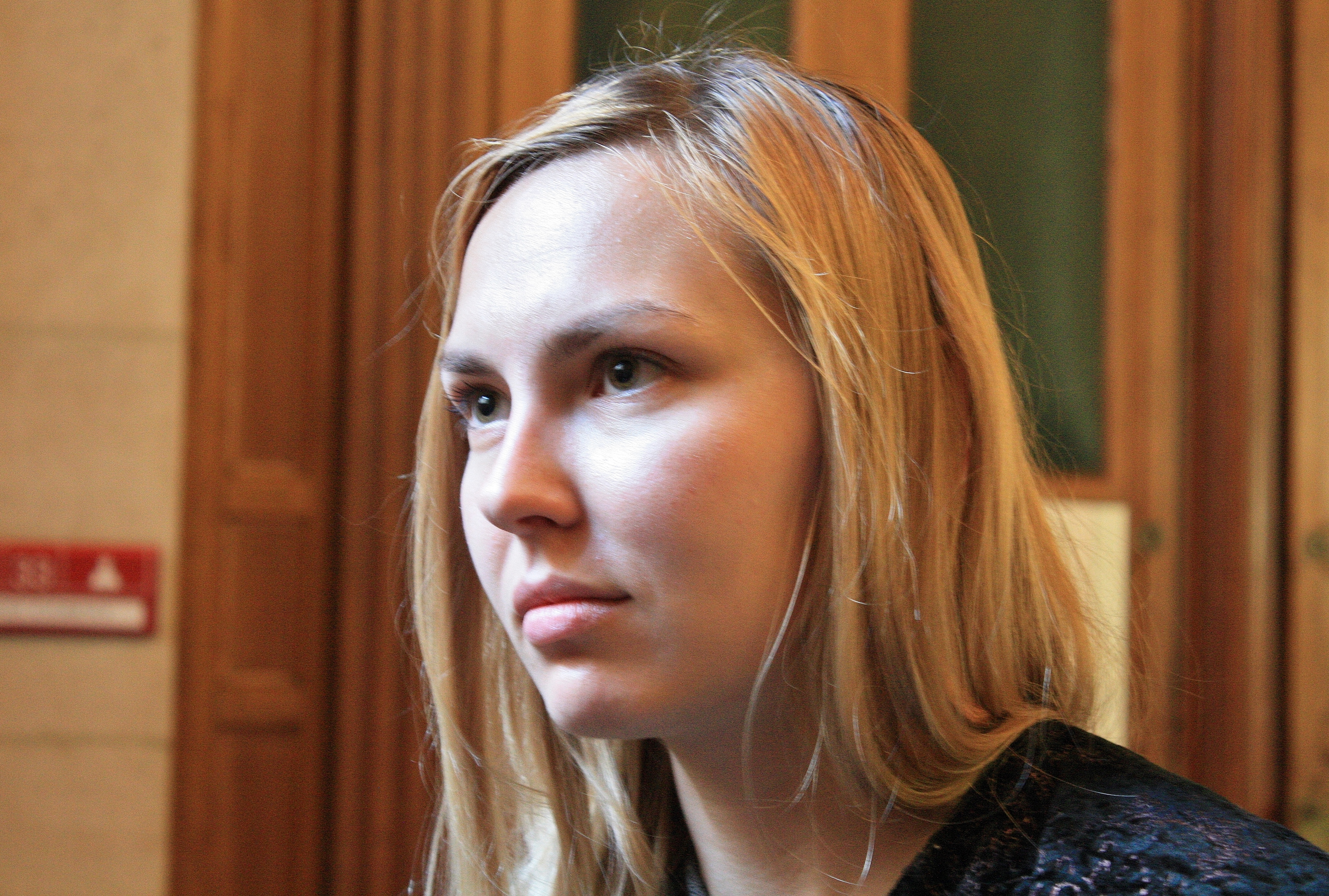
Zhdanova at the Court of Appeal in Paris on 27 October 2016

Zhdanova's additional feminist cause is to abolish the law on sexual exhibition. The article 222-32 of the French Penal Code stipulates that showing a half-nude or nude body in public is a penal offense because it is a deliberated act of sexual exhibition. Marie Dosé, Zhdanova's lawyer in this case, points out that this law has no ground to stand on because if a bare female breast during a political manifestation is an act of sexual exhibition, then a bare male breast in a similar case should be considered the same way, following the principle of equality between men and women. Furthermore, the purpose of a naked breast for Zhdanova's activism, as she declared, is not to provoke sexually the public but to draw public attention to political and social problems. The verdict of the Court of Appeal on 12 January 2017 is the first decision in France on an Appeal level which declared not guilty a person, in this case Zhdanova, already convicted for sexual exhibition.

In regard to the Zhdanova jurisprudence, it is already applied: on 12 March 2021, on the occasion of the Cesars ceremony (the French Oscars) in Paris, French actress Corinne Masiero took all her clothes off on stage, with the slogan "No Culture, No Future" on her breast, in order to protest for the extremely difficult situation for artists during the Covid-19 pandemic lockdown. A group of nine members of the French Parliament asked to the prosecutor of the city of Paris Rémy Heitz to sue the actress for sexual exhibition. On 22 March 2021, the prosecutor of Paris refused to sue the actress, declaring that such a trial would be inappropriate within the special conditions endured by people in culture, and also it would go against the Zhdanova jurisprudence, number 35/26-2-2020, according which the actress's act was part of her right to freedom of speech and expression in an artistic and political context.

== Association ==
Zhdanova is the co-founder and co-president, along with Sasha Shevchenko, of the non-profit association FEMEN, created on 7 April 2016. The principles of the association, according to its statutes, are to raise the level of feminism in the actual society and to contribute to equality between women and men in a practical way. The documents of the association were submitted to the Police Prefecture in Paris on 2 May 2016 and they were recognized and published in the Official Journal of French Republic on 14 May 2016.

== Filmography ==
Ukraine Is Not a Brothel, running time 78 minutes, by the Australian Kitty Green, world premiere on 4 September 2013 at the 70th Venice International Film Festival. From 4 to 7 September 2013, Zhdanova was invited to the 70th Venice International Film Festival for the world premiere of the movie.
