= Femen France =

French branch of feminist protest group FEMEN

FEMEN France is the French branch of FEMEN (Ukrainian: Фемен), a feminist protest group founded in Ukraine in 2008 and famous for organizing topless protests. In October 2013 FEMEN had its largest membership in France. As of early January 2013, the organization consisted of 30 local activists. The only Ukrainians regularly present were Oksana Shachko and Inna Shevchenko.

== Origins ==
On 17 August 2012, following the conviction and sentencing in Moscow (Russia) of Pussy Riot, core FEMEN member Inna Shevchenko used a chainsaw to cut down a five-meter Christian cross near Maidan Nezalezhnosti in Kyiv. A criminal case was opened against FEMEN charging them with hooliganism. After the incident, Inna Shevchenko left the country and went to Paris to set up a French-based FEMEN training center for activists.

The international training center opened on 18 September 2012. 15 activists marched topless from the metro station Château Rouge to the Lavoir Moderne Parisien, where their new headquarters are located, and organized a press conference there.

== Actions ==
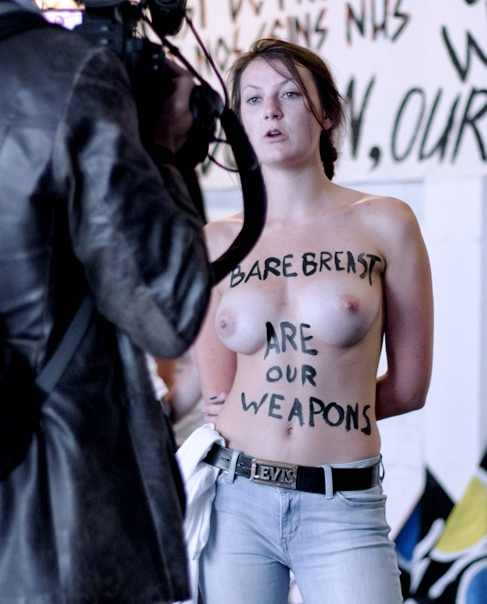
A FEMEN France protester, 2012

On 3 October 2012, French activists protested against rape by standing topless in front of the Venus de Milo statue in the Louvre Museum. The FEMEN activists shouted, "We have hands to stop rape". They stated they chose the Venus de Milo because it has no arms, arguing this best symbolizes a woman's helplessness and vulnerability. This protest followed an incident in Tunisia where a woman faced charges of indecency after claiming she was raped by police officers.

On 15 October 2012, 8 topless activists protested in front of the French Ministry of Justice at the Place Vendôme in Paris in response to the verdict in the trial of fourteen men for the gang rape of teenage girls. After a four-week trial in Fontenay-sous-Bois near Paris, four of the accused were found guilty of taking part in gang rapes, but 10 were acquitted. The sentences were far lighter than those recommended by the state prosecutor, who had called for prison sentences of five to seven years for eight of the men. The protestors accused the French authorities of tolerating the rape of minors.

6 April 2014: Members of Femen demonstrate topless in front of the Ukrainian embassy, urinating on photographs of Ukrainian President Viktor Yanukovych

10 February 2015: Topless Femen protesters confront Dominique Strauss-Kahn outside his trial in Lille, France

23 March 2015: Topless Femen protesters confront Dominique Strauss-Kahn outside his trial in Lille, France

1 May 2015: Topless Femen protest disrupts French presidential candidate Marine Le Pen's May Day rally

12 September 2015: Two topless Femen protesters with slogans on their chests disrupt a Muslim conference focused on women in Islam, in Pontoise, outside Paris.

28 January 2016: Topless Femen activist "hangs" herself to protest against Iranian President Hassan Rouhani's visit to Paris

In March 2016, three Femen activists were acquitted of exhibitionism for a topless protest held in February 2015, coinciding with former International Monetary Fund chief Dominique Strauss-Kahn's arrival at his trial for "aggravated pimping."

In November 2018, protestors jumped a presidential barricade on the Champs Elysees to protest Donald Trump’s visit to Paris.

In September 2020, Femen held a protest at the Musée d'Orsay to support women who experience sexual discrimination.

== See also ==
- Feminism in France
