= Alexandra Shevchenko =

Ukrainian radical feminist (born 1988)

Olexandra Shevchenko
- Олександра Шевченко
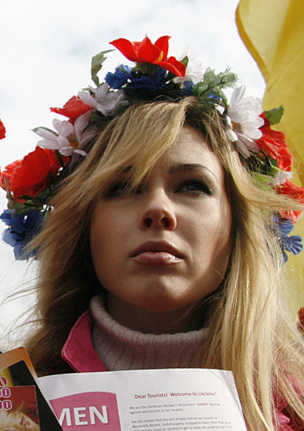
- Shevchenko in 2010
- Born: 24 April 1988 (age 38); Khmelnytskyi, Khmelnytskyi Oblast, Ukrainian SSR, Soviet Union
- Occupation: Activist
- Movement: Femen

Olexandra Shevchenko (Ukrainian: Олександра Шевченко; born 24 April 1988) is a member of the Ukrainian radical feminist protest group Femen, which regularly demonstrates topless against manifestations of patriarchy, dictatorship, religion, and the sex industry.

== Early life ==
Shevchenko was born on April 24, 1988, in Khmelnytskyi, Soviet Ukraine, where she grew up.

== FEMEN ==
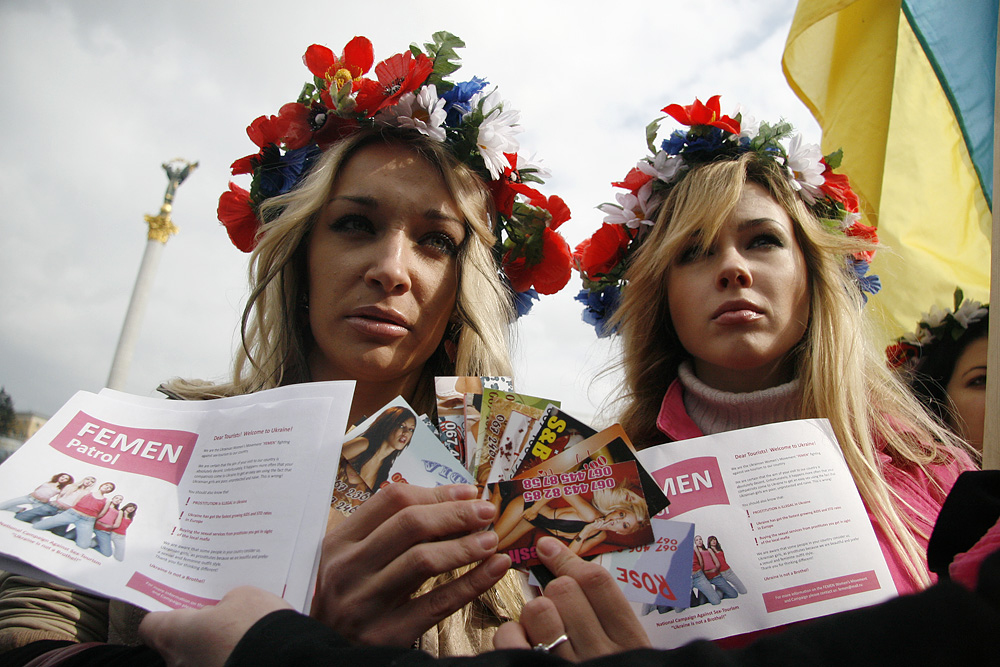
Shevchenko (right) and Inna Shevchenko prepare for the 2010 Kyiv campaign

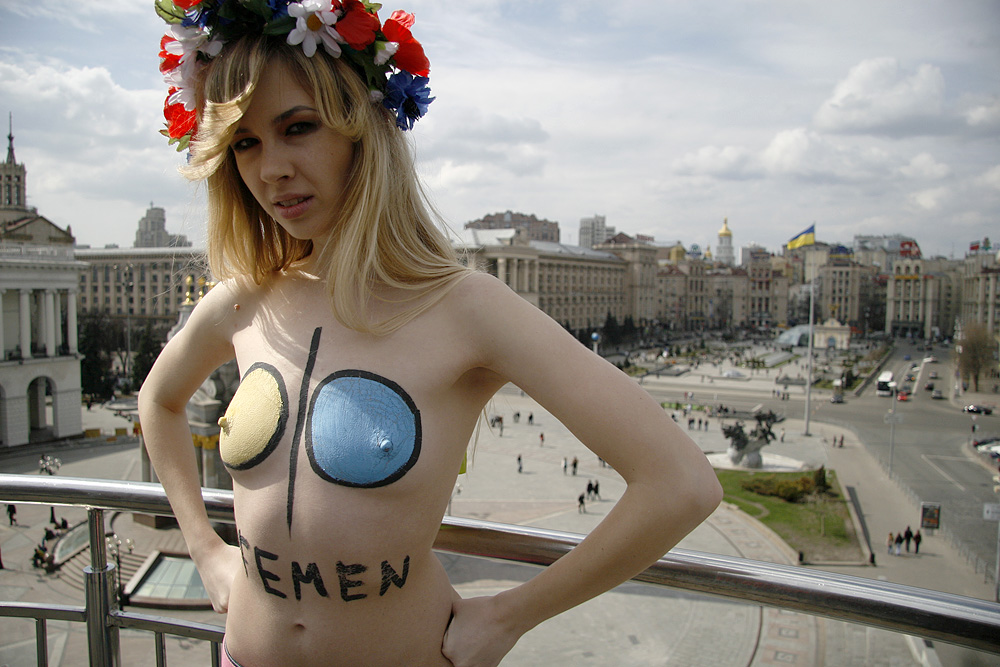
Shevchenko celebrates two years of FEMEN (2010)

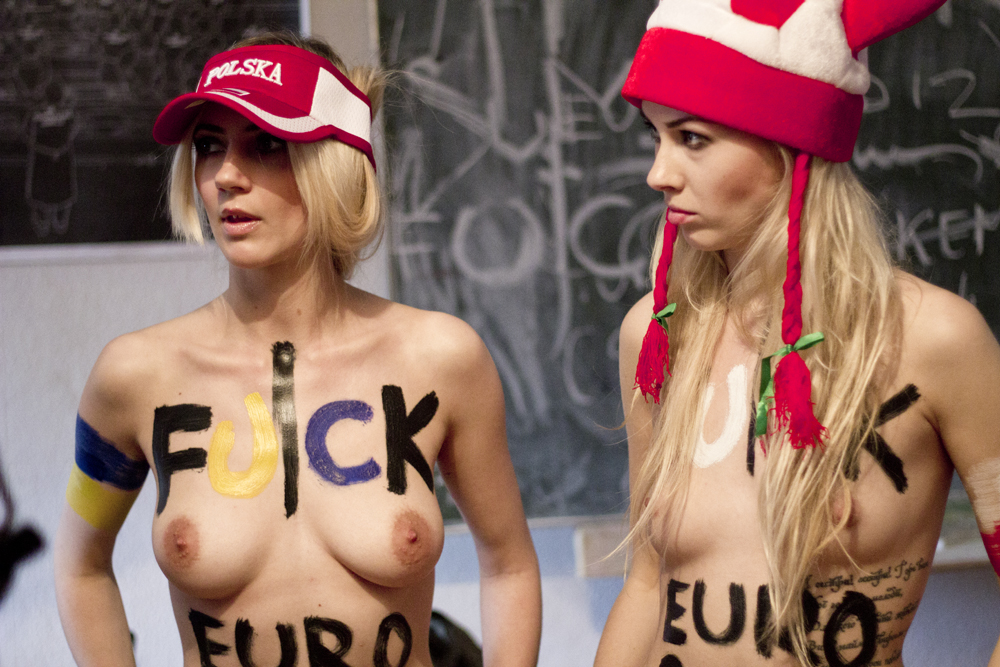
Shevchenko (right) prepares for the anti-Euro 2012 protest

Anna Hutsol formed FEMEN in Kyiv on 10 April 2008, with her two friends from their hometown of Khmelnytskyi, Olexandra Shevchenko and Oksana Shachko. They initially protested about issues affecting female students, but rapidly moved on to demonstrating against the sexual exploitation of Ukrainian women. It was in late August 2009 that Oksana Shachko became the first member of the group to bare her breasts during a protest, but it was not until 2010 that this approach became the usual tactic in FEMEN demonstrations, justified on the grounds that without the media attention generated by topless protests their message would not be heard.

In 2011, international news agencies started to pay more attention to the group.

In late 2011, Shevchenko, alongside Inna Shevchenko and Jenia Kraizman, took their protest onto the international stage. On 31 October 2011, they demonstrated dressed as French maids in Paris against Dominique Strauss-Kahn, on 5 November 2011, they protested against Silvio Berlusconi in Rome, the following day, they protested against Pope Benedict XVI outside St. Peters, and on 10 November, protested against prostitution in Zurich. On 9 December 2011, Shevchenko was in Moscow demonstrating against Vladimir Putin outside Christ the Saviour Cathedral.

In 2013, Shevchenko established a training facility for FEMEN Germany in Berlin.

On 9 February 2013, Shevchenko protested against female genital mutilation at the Berlin Film Festival, she had the words 'Stop Cutting my Pussy' written across her bare chest.

On 6 March 2013, FEMEN activists (including Shevchenko), in cooperation with French writer Galia Ackerman, released their first book called 'FEMEN' published by Calmann-Lévy in French.

In August 2013, Shevchenko fled out of Ukraine.

Subsequently, she settled in Paris where she married Russian photographer Dmitry Kostyukov in the following year.

== Bibliography ==
- Ackerman, Galia, with Anna Hutsol, Oksana Shachko, Alexandra 'Sasha' Shevchenko, & Inna Shevchenko, FEMEN, Published by Calmann-Lévy (Paris 2013), 280 pages. ISBN 978-2702144589. (French language publication)

== Filmography ==
- "Nos seins, nos armes!" (Our breasts, our weapons!), documentary film (1hour 10 mins), written and directed by Caroline Fourest and Nadia El Fani, produced by Nilaya Productions, aired on France 2 on 5 March 2013.
- "Everyday Rebellion", documentary film (1hour 58 mins), written and directed by the Riahi Brothers Arash T. Riahi and Arman T. Riahi, Austria / Switzerland / Germany, 2013, world premiere at Copenhagen International Documentary Festival on 13 November 2013.
- Ukraine Is Not a Brothel

== See also ==
- FEMEN France
- Feminism
- Nudity and protest
- Women's rights in Ukraine
