= Femen =

Feminist activist group

FEMEN Фемен
- Founded: 10 April 2008; 18 years ago
- Type: Protest and activist group
- Purpose: "Abolish patriarchy to achieve women's liberation"
- Location: Paris, France (main headquarters)
- Key people: Anna Hutsol; Oksana Shachko; Alexandra Shevchenko; Inna Shevchenko; Yana Zhdanova
- Website: femen.org

Femen (stylized in all caps; Russian and Ukrainian: Фемен; Belarusian: Фэмэн) is an international radical feminist activist group whose stated goal is to protect women's rights. The organisation became known for organising controversial topless protests against sex tourism, religious institutions, sexism, homophobia, and other social, national, and international topics. Founded in Ukraine, the group is now based in France. Femen describes its ideology as being "sextremism, atheism and feminism".

The organization describes itself as "fighting patriarchy in its three manifestations – sexual exploitation of women, dictatorship and religion" and has stated that its goal is "sextremism serving to protect women's rights". Femen activists have been regularly detained by police in response to their protests.

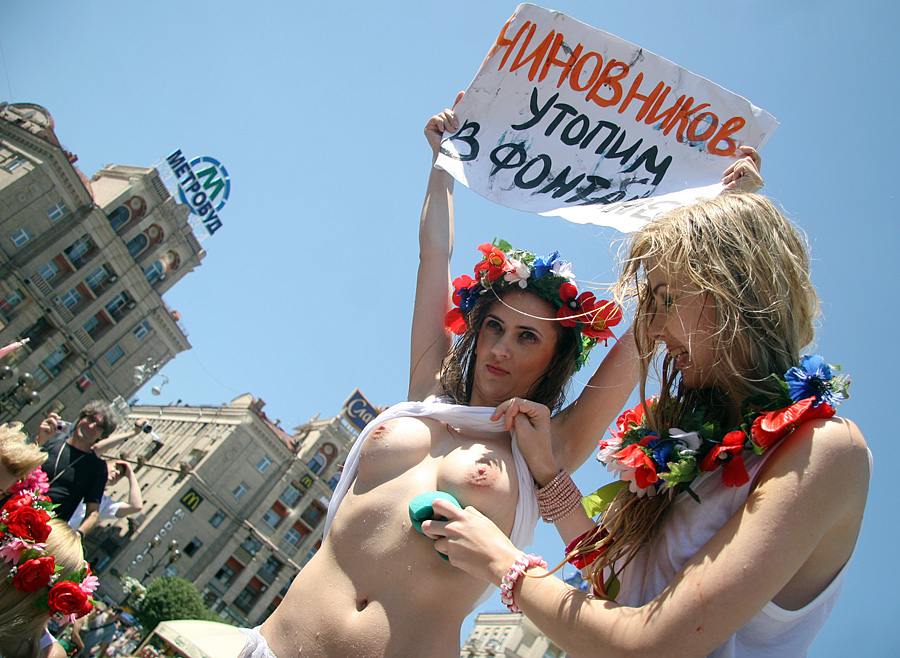
Femen Annual protest against regular summer hot water switch off, Kyiv, Ukraine, July 2010

== History ==
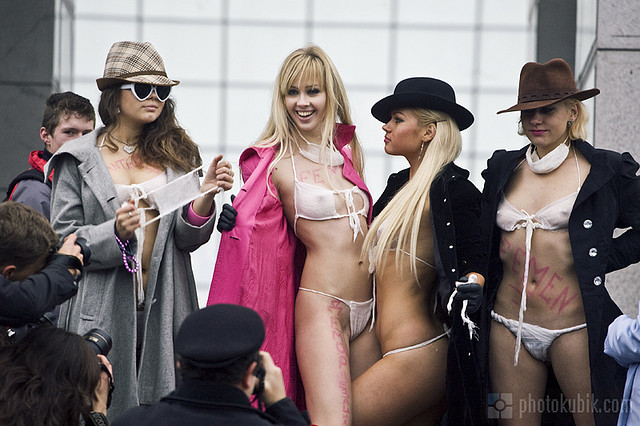
Femen protest in Kyiv, 9 November 2009. Early protests were provocative but not topless.

Anna Hutsol is credited as having founded the Femen movement on 10 April 2008, after she became aware of stories of Ukrainian women duped into going abroad and then taken advantage of sexually. However, according to the 2013 documentary by Kitty Green, Ukraine Is Not a Brothel, Femen was founded by Viktor Sviatsky. In September 2013 Inna Shevchenko responded to the documentary stating that Sviatsky "did lead the movement some time ago. [...] We accepted this because we did not know how to resist and fight it. [...] This is when I decided to leave Ukraine for France to build a new Femen". Femen member Inna Shevchenko discussed Sviatsky with The Independent in January, 2014, and, while not using the word 'founder' said: "I will never deny that he is a smart person. He was the reason why we knew each other. He was one of those smart people around us at the beginning, who were more experienced". Since 2013, Femen has been led by Inna Shevchenko.

Initially, Femen gained attention by demonstrating in skimpy or erotic clothing. For example, on 21 September 2008 in front of the Turkish embassy in Kyiv, a dozen Femen members were dressed as nurses with smudged makeup and high pink heels; however, at the 24 August 2009 demonstration on Ukrainian independence day, Oksana Shachko went topless. Since this approach obtained such great publicity, it rapidly became FEMEN's signature approach. While most of the protests have been confined to bare breasts, in October 2010 Shachko exposed her buttocks outside a locked toilet in a demonstration to protest the lack of public toilets in Kyiv, and four of the group members staged a similar protest in Kyiv in February 2011.

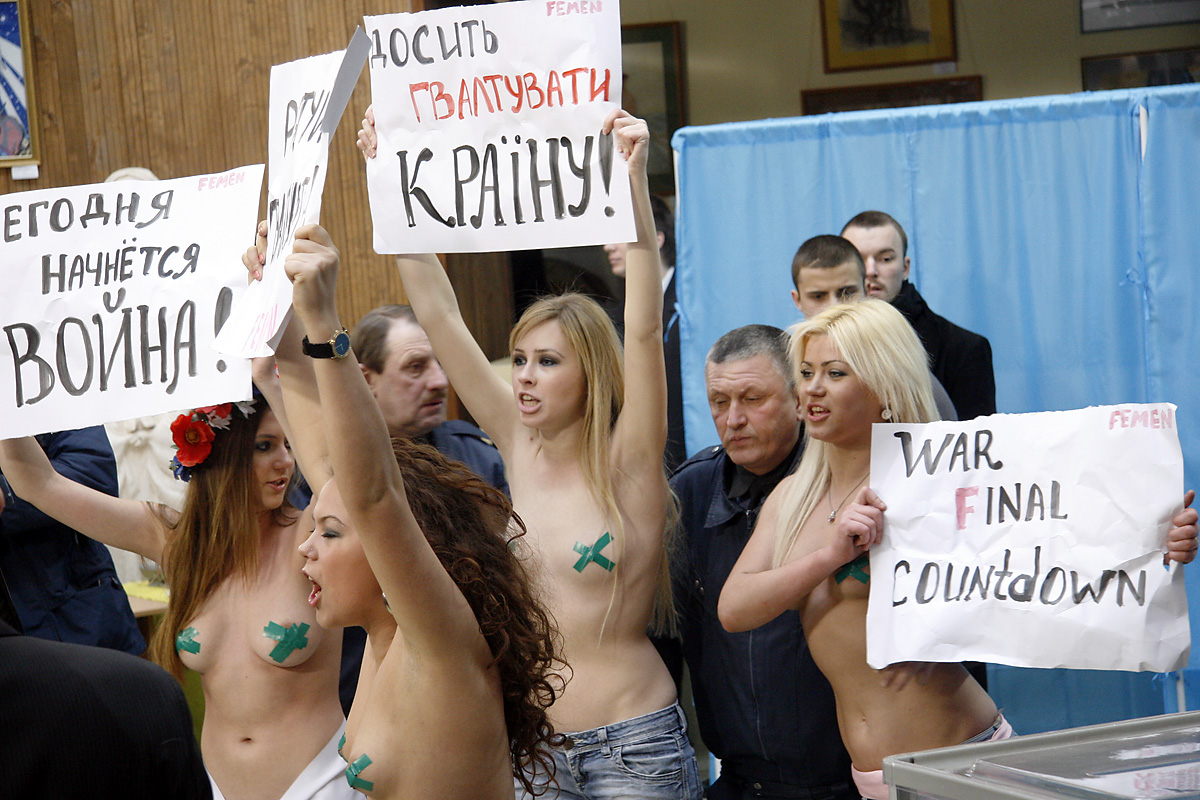
Femen protest in Kyiv during the 2010 Ukrainian presidential election against the election of Victor Yanukovych. The signs read "The War Begins Today" and "Stop Raping the Country."

Since May 2011, a host of international news outlets have started to report about the organization's actions; this has sharply heightened Femen's international profile.

From late 2011, the Ukrainian Femen activists started to hold more international protests. In December 2011, three Femen activists stated that the State Security Committee of the Republic of Belarus had abducted and terrorized them after they staged topless protests in Minsk. (Note: On 19 December 2011 Femen performed a topless protest against Belarus President Alexander Lukashenko outside the KGB Headquarters in Minsk, mocking Lukashenko's recognizable haircut and moustache. Afterwards, according to FEMEN, the three protesters Inna Shevchenko, Oksana Shachko, and Aleksandra Nemchinova were abducted by the Belarus authorities and taken to a remote forest blindfolded, doused with oil, forced to strip, and then threatened with being set on fire, before having their hair violently cut with knives and being abandoned in the snow half-naked.) On 8 April 2013, five Femen members "topless ambushed" Russian president Vladimir Putin (accompanied by German chancellor Angela Merkel) at the Hanover trade fair.

After Inna Shevchenko chopped down a wooden cross overlooking Maidan Nezalezhnosti in Kyiv on 17 August 2012, she stated that she had received several death threats and that her front door had been kicked in. Fearing arrest, she sought asylum in France and moved to Paris. There, in September 2012, she established a training facility for activists for Femen in France.

In late July 2013, one of the ideologists of the Femen, Viktor Sviatsky, (Note: Early September 2013 Inna Shevchenko stated that Femen had "broke free" of Sviatsky.) and Hutsol were assaulted on the eve of a visit by Putin to Kyiv to celebrate the 1,025th anniversary of the Christianisation of Kyivan Rus'. According to Hutsol, those who attacked them "resemble those cooperating with secret services SBU and FSB".

One of the founding members, Oksana Shachko, was found dead in Paris on 24 July 2018; her death is believed to have been a suicide. She was living as an independent artist separated from the group after disputes with other members.

== Organisation ==
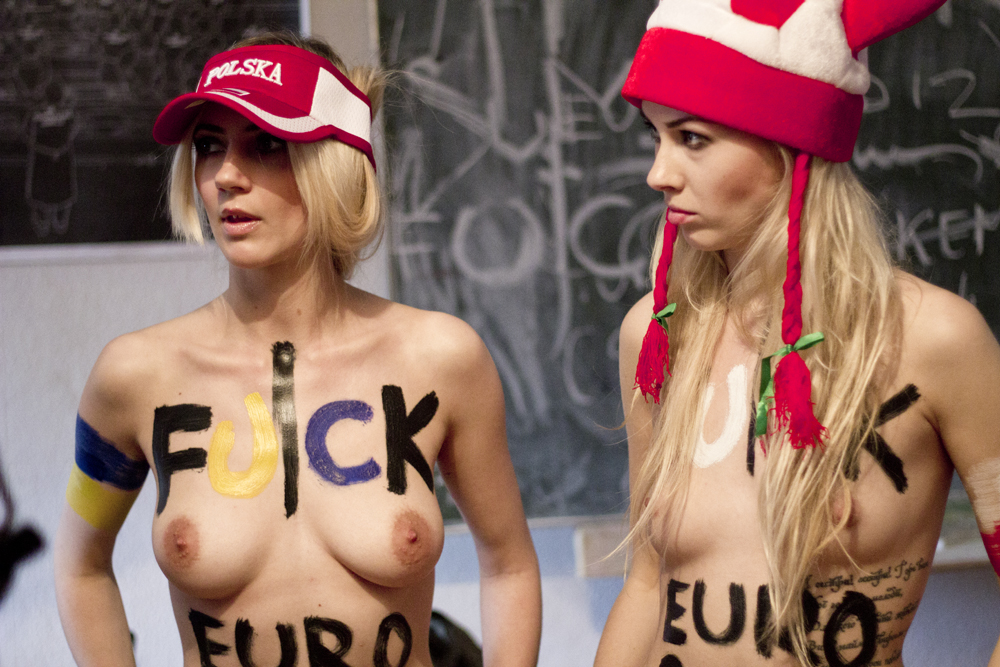
Femen protest against the Euro Cup on 8 June 2012

Femen has several international branches. The Femen office in their native Kyiv was closed and the organisation's leadership left Ukraine ("Fearing for their lives and freedom") in August 2013.

In October 2012, the organisation stated it had about 40 activists in Ukraine, and another 100, who had joined their protests abroad, as well as twelve thousand followers via the social network Vkontakte.

In October 2013, Femen had its largest membership in France. In January 2013, Femen France counted 30 local activists. In 2010, the group comprised some 320 activists, with about 300 of the active participants being in Kyiv. In a 2010 interview, Anna Hutsol said that in addition to 20 core organisers, there are 300 activists in Kyiv, as well as a social network based on vkontakte of about 20,000 persons. Female university students between 18 and 20 years old formed the backbone of the movement when it was formed in 2008, with few male members. In 2011, various sources stated that in an interview Anna Hutsol said that the movement has 150,000 supporters. In October 2012, the organization said that it had about 40 activists in Ukraine, and another 100 who had joined their protests abroad.

Hutsol stated in July 2010: "We are working better than any news agency. We have a photographer, cinematographer, designer, and content manager." In Ukraine, most of Femen's demonstrations were staged in Kyiv, but the organisation also held actions in other cities including Odesa, Dnipro, and Zaporizhzhia. In April 2010, the organisation contemplated becoming a political party to run for seats in the October 2012 Ukrainian parliamentary election. However, it did not take part in these elections.

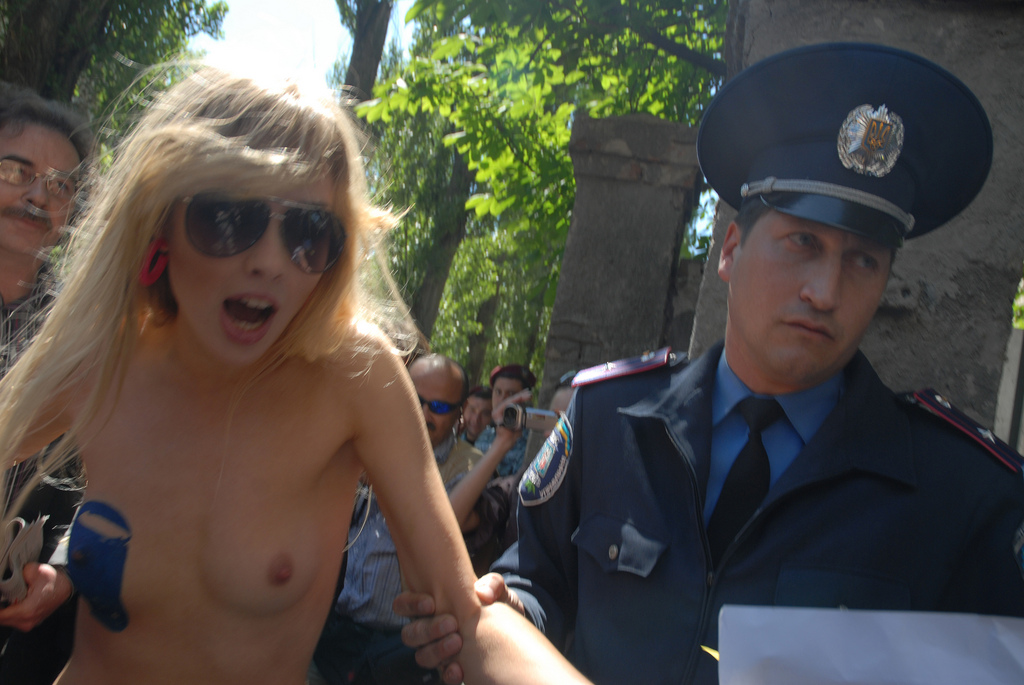
Demonstration in front of the Russian embassy in Kyiv, May 2010

The organization plans to become the biggest and the most influential movement in Europe.

Facebook initially blocked the Femen page because it suspected it was pornographic. In addition, Femen has displayed several provocative images on its Facebook page, including images of Femen activists taking a chainsaw to the heads of Vladimir Putin and Patriarch Kirill of Moscow, who were depicted covered in blood.

In 2010 and 2011, Ukrainian members had stated that their involvement in Femen had caused their families to become alienated from them. Some Femen members, including Inna Shevchenko and Oksana Shachko, were also subject to threats, kidnapping, beating, and other intimidation.

=== Criminal cases against the organisation ===
Several criminal cases have been opened against the organisation in Ukraine on charges of "hooliganism" and "desecration of state symbols", among others, and the group has received fines. In addition, most Femen activists are detained by the police after protesting; in one case, the State Security Committee of the Republic of Belarus arrested Femen activists, "threatening them with knives and cutting their hair". According to Femen, after the early 2010 election of Ukrainian President Viktor Yanukovych, the Security Service of Ukraine attempted to intimidate the Femen activists.

The Ukrainian police opened a criminal case against Femen when during its 27 August 2013 raid in the movement's Kyiv office it purportedly found a TT pistol and a grenade. Femen stated that these items were planted there by the Ukrainian police as part of a conspiracy by the Russian and Ukrainian secret services to prosecute the movement, which the police denied. (Note: On 28 August 2013 a Kyiv police spokesperson stated no one in the group had been charged but the criminal probe into illegal possession of weapons by the group continued and the women could be called in for further questioning.) On 30 August 2013, Femen activist Yana Zhdanova, Anna Hutsol, and Alexandra Shevchenko were called in for questioning; instead (according to a Femen statement), "fearing for their lives and freedom the activists escaped from Ukraine to Europe to continue Femen activities" (also in Ukraine, as Hutsol had stated three days before she left Ukraine). The Kyiv office became a (not Femen-affiliated) bookstore on 23 October 2013. By early March, Hutsol said that although the regime that had criminally probed them had fallen, it was "too risky to return to Ukraine"; in a February 2014 interview, Hutsol also stated that Femen activists who had stayed in Ukraine had helped during the Euromaidan protests that ultimately toppled this regime. Femen actions did recur in Kyiv in the summer of 2014.

=== International branches ===
==== Femen France ====
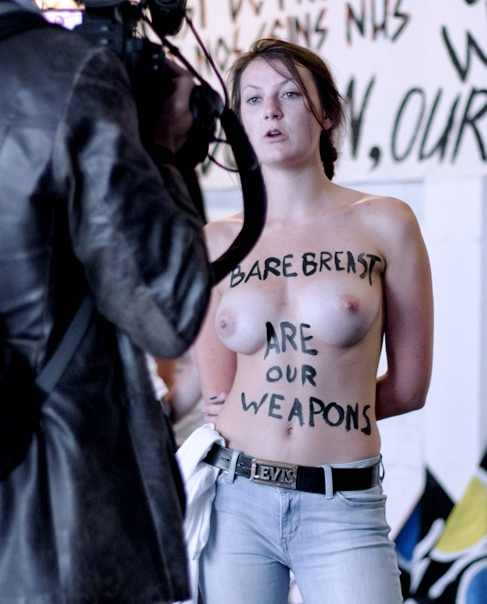
A Femen France protester, 2012

Femen France is the French branch of Femen. After cutting down a crucifix near Maidan Nezalezhnosti in Kyiv in August 2012, Inna Shevchenko left the country and went to Paris to set up Femen France, a training centre for activists. The international training centre opened on 18 September 2012.

As of early January 2013, the organisation consisted of 30 local activists. The only Ukrainians regularly present were Oksana Shachko and Inna Shevchenko. On 6 March 2013, Femen activists, together with French writer Galia Ackerman, released their first book, Femen, which was published by Calmann-Lévy.

The international training centre opened on 18 September 2012. 15 activists marched topless from the metro station Château Rouge to the Lavoir Moderne Parisien, where their new headquarters are located, and organised a press conference there.

On 3 October 2012, French activists Éloïse Bouton, Elvire Duvelle-Charles, Miyabi K., Julia Javel, Jenny Bah, Nathalie Vignes, and Inna Shevchenko protested against rape by standing topless in front of the Venus de Milo statue in the Louvre Museum. The Femen activists shouted, "We have hands to stop rape". They stated they chose the Venus de Milo because it has no arms, arguing this best symbolises a woman's helplessness and vulnerability. This protest followed an incident in Tunisia where a woman faced charges of indecency after she said she was raped by police officers.

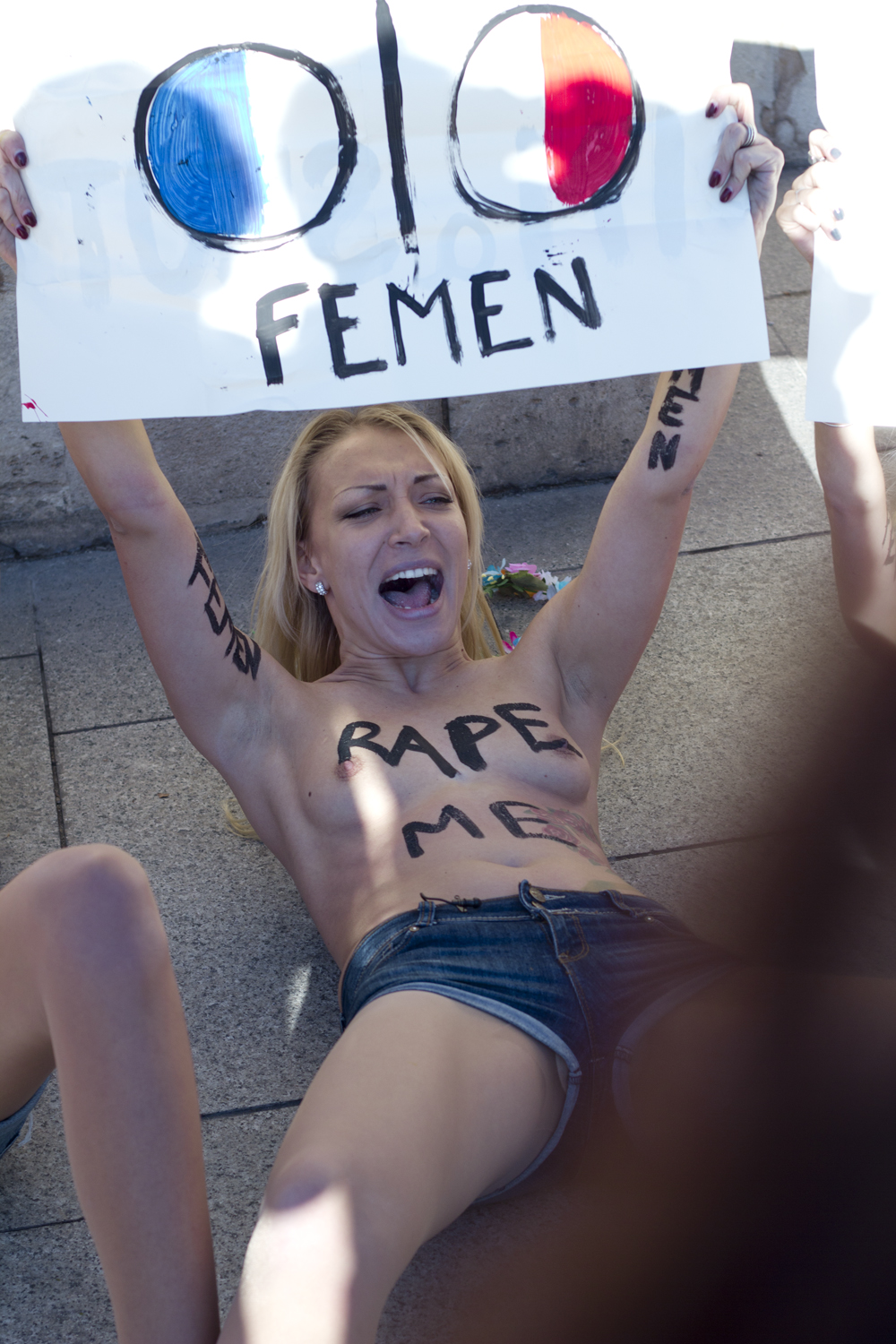
Demonstration by Femen in Paris, 15 October 2012

On 15 October 2012, eight topless activists protested in front of the French Ministry of Justice at the Place Vendôme in Paris in response to the verdict in the trial of fourteen men for the gang rape of teenage girls. After a four-week trial in Fontenay-sous-Bois near Paris, four of the accused were found guilty of taking part in gang rapes, ten were acquitted. The sentences were far lighter than those recommended by the state prosecutor, who had called for prison sentences of five to seven years for eight of the men. The protesters accused the French authorities of tolerating the rape of minors.

In September 2015, two topless Femen activists jumped onto the stage of a conservative Muslim conference in Paris.

==== Other branches ====
Since late 2011, Femen has held rallies outside Ukraine. In late April 2011, the organization said it was setting up international branches in Warsaw, Zürich, Rome, Tel Aviv, and Rio de Janeiro. A demonstration by a group called RU Femen in the Russian capital, Moscow, in late April 2011 was immediately denounced as a fake offspring of Femen. Femen accused the Russian political party United Russia of having set up RU Femen. Early in 2013, Femen said that it had members in Brazil, Germany, the U.S., Canada, Switzerland, Italy, Bulgaria, and Tunisia.

On 23 January 2013, a third national Femen-group was opened officially when Alexandra Shevchenko launched Femen in Germany proposing to train and lead the group from Berlin and Hamburg bases. The German branch of Femen was founded by Irina Khanova, Hellen Langhorst, and Klara Martens. An action the group took was amid the opening of the Barbie Dream House in Berlin's Alexanderplatz. Right before the pink plastic building opened, a Femen member emerged topless from a model high-heel shoe burning a Barbie doll, in protest of what was widely seen as giving girls an unrealistic view of life. The Femen member had written on her chest: "life in plastic is not fantastic".

A Quebec-based Femen is also active, founded by Ukraine-born, Sept-Îles-raised Xenia Chernyshova.

On 10 September 2013, the Belgium branch of Femen voluntary disbanded itself. (Note: The reason given on its Facebook page was: "disagreement about the internal organisation within the international movement Femen".)

A branch of Femen in Turkey, founded in late-2013 is also active.

In June 2014, Femen opened a branch in Israel with 15 women. Femen notes, "our numbers are growing from week to week." The members, who range in age from 17 to 30, come from all over the country.

In August 2016, a branch of Femen launched in the United States of America, based in Seattle, Washington, and led by Jordan Robson. To date, their most publicised action has been a protest held at the polling station used by Donald Trump in New York City on 8 November 2016.

== Goals and stances ==
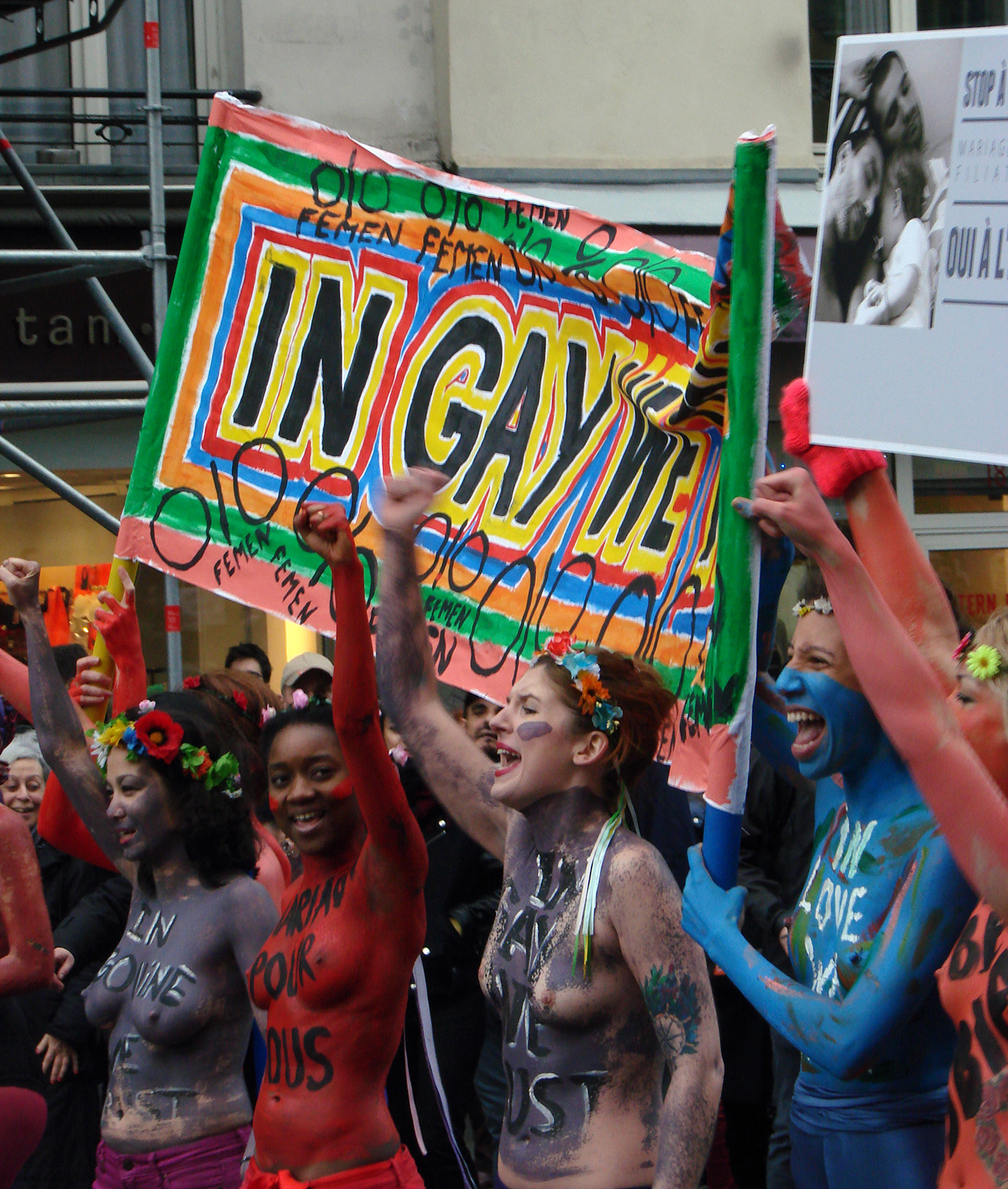
Demonstration in support of same-sex marriage in Paris, 16 December 2012

Femen describes its stance as "radical feminism", and says that it is "fighting patriarchy in its three manifestations – sexual exploitation of women, dictatorship and religion". Femen has pledged to fight the sex industry and marriage agencies, the Church and its pro-life beliefs and patriarchal society, as well as those who oppose gay marriage. Femen has expressed opposition against Islamism, "Sharia law" and spoken against the practice of female genital mutilation (FGM). On its official website Femen states: "Femen – is sextremism serving to protect women's rights, democracy watchdogs attacking patriarchy, in all its forms: the dictatorship, the church, the sex industry".

Femen has expressed both support for and opposition against various public figures and organisations; for example, the group lauded Pussy Riot, and collaborated with Aliaa Elmahdy. In 2011, the group stated that it had enjoyed limited success in pushing its agenda. It was also criticised for failure "to provide much insight into what the concrete goals [of the organisation] are".

=== Feminist issues ===
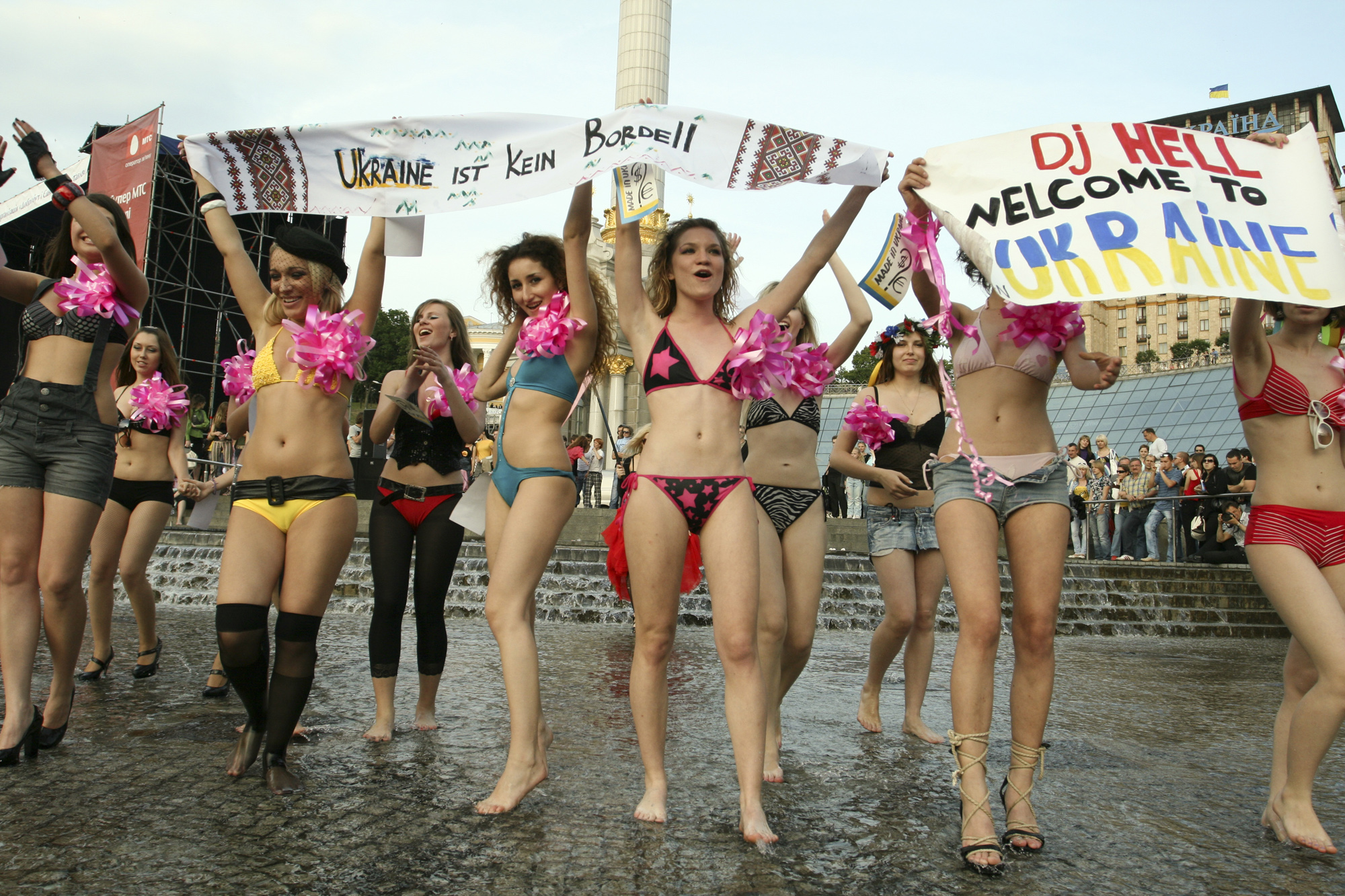
May 2009 "Ukraine is not a Brothel!" protest on Maidan Nezalezhnosti against the increase in sex tourism into Ukraine

Founder Anna Hutsol is adamantly opposed to legalising prostitution in Ukraine and advocates for criminalization of prostitution abroad. In late May 2009, Femen proposed the introduction of criminal responsibility for the use of sex industry services. Femen protested against what they argued were moves being made by the Ukrainian government to legalise prostitution during the EURO 2012 championships. The group asked UEFA and the Ukrainian government to create a social program devoted to the problem of sex tourism and prostitution in Ukraine; to inform football fans that prostitution is illegal in Ukraine; and to take additional steps to fight against prostitution and sex tourism. (Note: As a counter-act Polish prostitutes held their own nude demonstration (in masks) with the catchphrase "Femen! Get the fuck out of our business".)

Despite Femen's objection to the sex industry, the group has fought against the prosecution of Anastasia Grishay by Ukrainian authorities (initiated by a prominent Communist member of parliament) on grounds of her involvement in pornography.

According to (founder) Hutsol; "The Femen movement stands for women-related policies, not women in politics". Femen's leadership had very low expectations of all early 2010s mainstream Ukrainian politicians. When asked (in April 2013) if she considered German chancellor Angela Merkel "the enemy" Alexandra Shevchenko replied: "In so far as she shakes the hand of the dictator, yes; like Yulia Tymoshenko and like Margaret Thatcher before them, she has hardly spoken out for women's rights".

=== Ukrainian issues ===
Femen has protested "against the limitation of democratic liberties and freedom of the press" during Viktor Yanukovich's presidency and against (Ukrainian) government corruption.

Femen protest actions have also taken place against anti-Ukrainian policies by the Russian Orthodox Church, president, and government. It also demanded "independence for the Ukrainian church".

In 2012, Femen stated that its goals were "to develop leadership, intellectual and moral qualities of young women in Ukraine" and "to build up the image of Ukraine, [a] country with great opportunities for women". In 2010, the stated goals of the organisation were "to shake women in Ukraine, making them socially active; to organise in 2017 a women's revolution."

=== 2020s ===
In August 2022, Femen claimed responsibility for a topless protest against German chancellor Olaf Scholz, and his administration's continued links to Russian oil and gas, following the outbreak of the Russian invasion of Ukraine. The activists call for an immediate embargo of Russian gas.

In October 2024, Femen staged the "Fuck Russia" and "Fuck Iran" protest in front of the Iranian Embassy in Kyiv, condemning the inaction of the international community as Iranian drones killed Ukrainian civilians. The protest targeted the Iranian and Russian governments and the perceived failures of the UN to address the crisis.

In December 2024, Femen organised the

1. unrussiaUN and "Fuck UN" protest at the "Broken Chair" sculpture in Geneva, calling for Russia's expulsion from the United Nations and criticising the organisation's passivity in responding to the war in Ukraine. The protest highlighted the human cost of the conflict and the need for decisive international action.

In December 2024, Femen staged a protest in Vatican City to highlight Russia's war crimes against Ukrainian children.

On 27 December 2024, Femen activist Yana Fedorets held a protest in the Vatican's St. Peter's Square to draw attention to the forced displacement of Ukrainian children by Russian forces. The peaceful action was met with an aggressive response, with Fedorets and a photographer documenting the event detained by local police.

Despite efforts to destroy all photographs, some were successfully transmitted before the arrests, ensuring the protest gained international attention. Femen continues to call for decisive global action against Russian war crimes.

A Femen protest took place in front of the German Embassy in Kyiv on 23 February 2025. A Femen activist called on German society to “stop a new wave of fascism before it's too late.” On the activist's back was the inscription "Weidel Putin Slut", which is German for "Weidel is Putin's whore". Alice Weidel is the leader of the far-right Alternative for Germany (AfD) party

=== International issues ===
In December 2012, Femen "warned" the European Union "to stop immediately political, economic and cultural contacts with Gazprom-Kremlin's dictatorship", because "dependence on Nord Stream 1 will bring Europe to an economic collapse and the abolition of visas requirements for Russians threatens Europe with a cultural Armageddon". An 8 April 2013 "topless ambush" of Russian president Vladimir Putin (accompanied by German chancellor Angela Merkel) at the Hanover trade fair was described by Alexandra Shevchenko as "non-violent women protesting against the most dangerous dictator in the world, it got great coverage and will hopefully inspire people in Russia as well as helping us to recruit new members".

== Protests against religious institutions ==
Examples of Femen protests against religious institutions are:

- In November 2011, Femen activist Alexandra Shevchenko started stripping and waving a banner stating "Freedom for women" after Pope Benedict XVI's Sunday sermon at Saint Peter's Square at the Holy See. Shevchenko and her associates were immediately arrested by the Italian Police.
- In April 2012, five Femen activists protested legislation that would halt abortions in Ukraine by staging a pro-choice demonstration at the belfry of Saint Sophia Cathedral in Kyiv, ringing the church bells while doing so. The protest was dispersed by police.
- On 26 July 2012, a topless Femen activist, Yana Zhdanova, attacked the Patriarch of Moscow and all the Rus', Kirill I of Moscow, while he was visiting Ukraine. Zhdanova had the words "Kill Kirill" painted on her back and screamed "Get Out!" to the Orthodox Christian leader. She was placed under arrest for fifteen days for her actions.
- The organisation staged a topless protest at the 2012 Summer Olympics in London in opposition to "bloody Islamist regimes", which they accuse the IOC of supporting. The protest included women in the clothing of Muslim men as well as signs stating "No Sharia".
- On 17 August 2012, Inna Shevchenko and two other Femen activists chainsawed down a large wooden Christian crucifix that was dedicated to Uniate Christian victims of antireligious Stalinist purges, near Maidan Nezalezhnosti in Kyiv in support for the Russian group Pussy Riot. As three members of Pussy Riot were to be sentenced by a Russian court later that day. (Note: The desecration of the cross was repudiated by Maria Alyokhina of Pussy Riot, who said "Their surprise displays and protests against authoritarianism are similar to us, but we look at feminism differently, especially the form of speech. We wouldn't take our clothes off, and will not. Their latest action, the sawing of the cross, does not create a feeling of solidarity, unfortunately.") The action attracted overwhelmingly negative responses. A criminal case was opened against Femen under "Part 2 of Article 296 (hooliganism) of the Criminal Code of Ukraine". Femen stated that after the incident, special forces troops from the Ministry of Internal Affairs organised a blockade around Femen's headquarters in Kyiv. On 18 August 2012, a new Christian cross was erected at the same site.
- In January 2013, four Ukrainian Femen activists protested topless in favour of LGBT adoption at the Pope's weekly address in St. Peter's Square, Vatican City.
- On Christmas Day 2013, a German Femen member disrupted a service in the Cologne Cathedral to protest against Cardinal Meisner's "very conservative orientation." She was subsequently fined €600.
- Femen activists burned the Salafist flag in front of the Great Mosque of Paris on 3 April 2013, as part of a solidarity protest with Amina Tyler.
- On 12 September 2015, two Femen protesters attending the conference as Arabs, ripped their cloaks on stage and went topless at a controversial conference near Paris on the role of Muslim women. After being taken off stage by security, several men rushed the stage and began beating one of the protestors.
- On 25 December 2017, one topless activist from the group tried to snatch the statue of the infant Jesus from the nativity scene in St. Peter's Square screaming, "God is woman." Before she was able to steal the statue, however, she was tackled to the ground by guards.

== Amina Tyler case ==
Amina Tyler (real name Amina Sboui), a Tunisian Femen activist, was arrested on 19 May 2013 in Tunis. International protests followed for her release from detention. On 12 June 2013, a Tunisian judge convicted two French Femen members and one German Femen member after they were charged with public indecency while protesting for the release of Tyler. Pauline Hillier, Marguerite Stern and Josephine Markmann were released on 26 June 2013 after a Tunisian court lifted their prison sentence.

Amina Tyler was acquitted for contempt and defamation on 29 July 2013; but she remained jailed pending trial on a separate charge of desecrating a cemetery.

Femen had staged protests in front of the Grand Mosque of Paris burning a Tawhid flag. Amina upon release in August 2013 from detention in a Tunisian jail declared she was leaving the group in protest adding that she thought Femen's actions in Paris were disrespectful to the Muslim world and because she saw a lack of financial transparency in the organisation.

== Cultural and political image ==
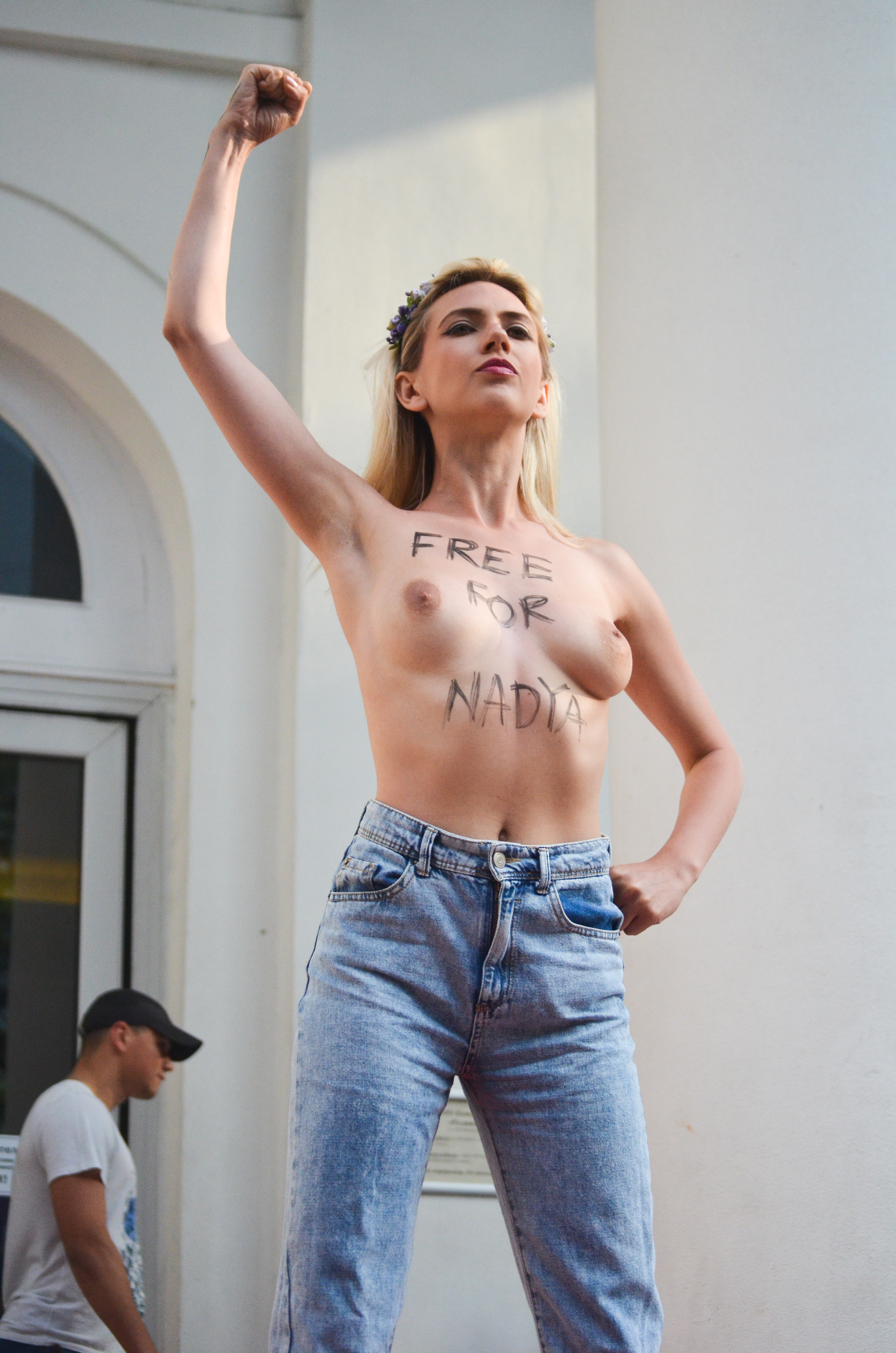
FEMEN mono-protest at the 5th Odesa International Film Festival in support of the Ukrainian pilot Nadiya Savchenko, who was captured by forces of the Luhansk People's Republic and arrested in Russia, July 2014

Critics have stated Femen members are more interested in self-promotion than real reform, and that their antics are often tacky and undermine the cause of their protests. According to Ukrainian gender studies expert Tetyana Bureychak, most Ukrainian women are unimpressed by Femen. Ukrainian sociologist Oleh Demkiv has spoken out against the controversial nature of Femen's protests and in July 2011 he stated they "unfortunately, do not enjoy popular support, or lead to changes in Ukraine's consciousness". In February 2013, Joanna Rohozinska (from National Endowment for Democracy) stated "there is little evidence of any of Femen's protests having significant impact", and she called Femen's decision to set up branches in outside Ukraine "as disingenuous at best and, frankly, somewhat cowardly". Positive remarks in Ukraine about Femen came from Maria Mayerchyk (of Lviv University), who has spoken about Femen, saying that they are a "positive, radical and important phenomenon that is able to raise social issues", and Larysa Kobelianska (UN-led women's rights program) said the group has succeeded in attracting public attention to women's problems, even if by questionable means.

The group is seen more positively abroad. Naomi Westland wrote that "Western countries are more accustomed than those in the Eastern Hemisphere to seeing naked or semi-naked bodies in the media and on the streets. But in countries where nudity is taboo, the protests have more profound impact." Jeffrey Tayler noted: "Femen originated in Ukraine, born of young women who grew up without exposure to the West's culture of political correctness and who have scant respect for it; from their country's Soviet past, they know how deleterious the stifling of free speech can be. Now that they have moved to the West, Femen has courageously broken rules and enlivened the debate over religion's role in our world." Femen received a positive reception after opening their location in Paris.

In September 2013, Femen came under criticism when an Australian documentary filmmaker Kitty Green exposed a man named Victor Svyatski as the founder of the group. Svyatski was previously known as only a consultant to the movement.

== Financing ==
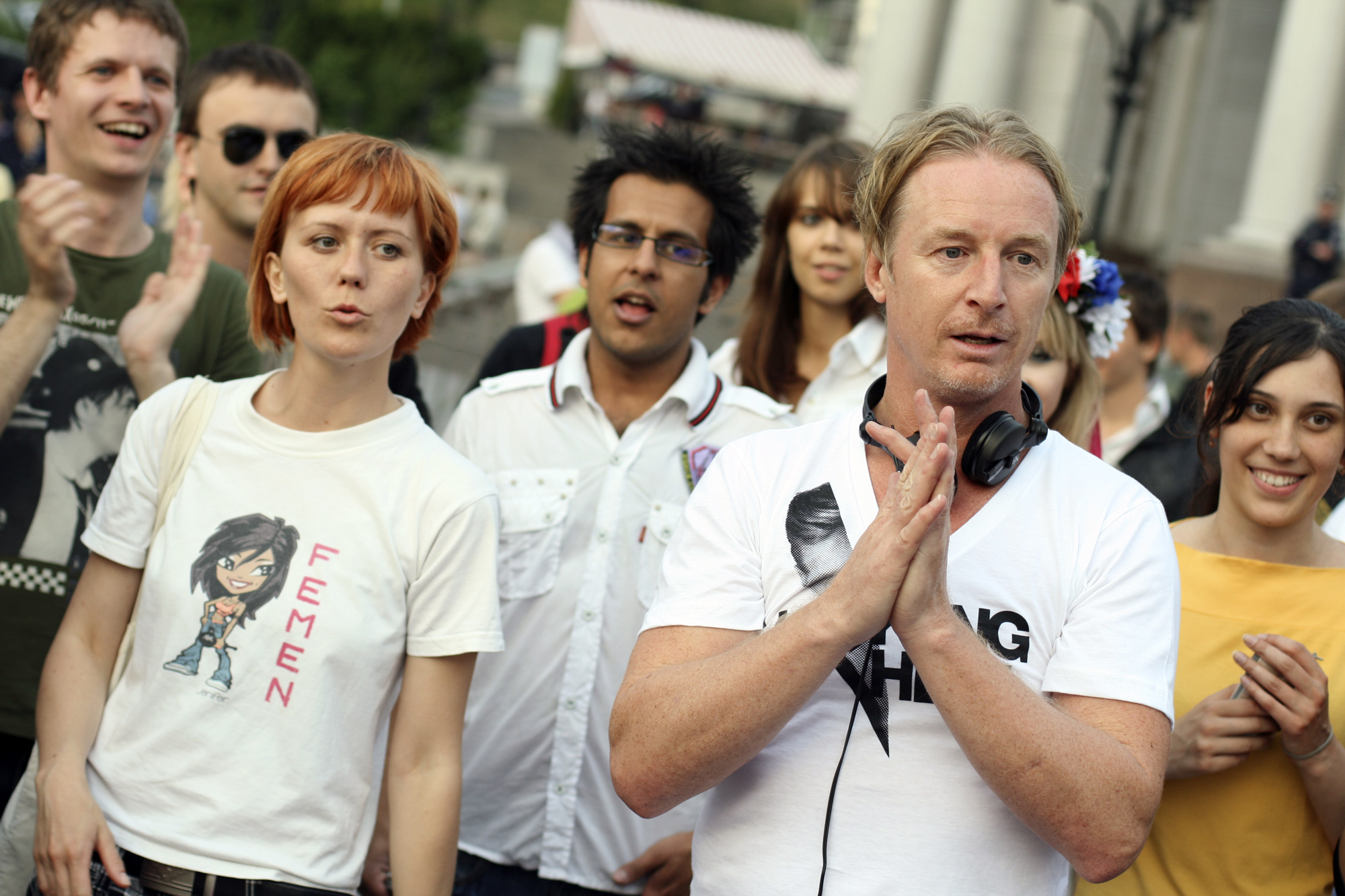
Femen founder Anna Hutsol watches a Femen demonstration with DJ Hell in Kyiv on 22 May 2009.

Femen activists earn funding through the sale of products bearing the Femen logo. Femen also receives donations from individuals, like Helmut Geier (also known as DJ under the alias DJ Hell), and German businesswoman Beate Schober, who resided in Ukraine.

In March 2012 Ukrainian magazine Focus said that Femen activists receive royalties for foreign interviews and in the tabloids. In the magazine Anna Hutsol confirmed that a rally in Istanbul was sponsored by a Turkish company producing underwear.

== See also ==
- Feminism
- Gender equality
- History of feminism
- LGBT rights in Ukraine
- Nudity and protest
- Postfeminism
- Sex-positive feminism
- Women's Equality Day
- Women in Ukraine
- Women's rights in Ukraine

== Bibliography ==
- Ackerman, Galia; et al., Femen, Published by Calmann-Lévy (Paris 2013), 280 pages. ISBN 978-2702144589. (French language publication)
- Ceresa, Massimo (15 December 2015). Femen, Inna e le altre streghe senza Dio [Femen, Inna and the other godless witches.] (in Italian). Lucca: Tra le righe libri. ISBN 978-8899141370.
- Goujon, Olivier (21 September 2017). Femen: Histoire d'une trahison [Femen: History of a Betrayal] (in French). Paris: Max Milo Editions. ISBN 978-2315008186. Published by Max Milo Editions (Paris), 364 pages. (French language publication)

== Filmography ==
- Nos seins, nos armes ! (Our breasts, our weapons!), documentary film (1hour 10 mins), written and directed by Caroline Fourest and Nadia El Fani, produced by Nilaya Productions, aired on France 2 on 5 March 2013.
- Everyday Rebellion, documentary film (1hour 58 mins), written and directed by the Riahi Brothers Arash T. Riahi and Arman Riahi, Austria / Switzerland / Germany, 2013, world premiere at Copenhagen International Documentary Festival on 13 November 2013.
- Ukraine Is Not a Brothel
- Je Suis Femen (I Am Femen), 2014, documentary film, written and directed by Alain Margot.
- FEMEN: Sextremism in Canada, 2016, documentary film, examining the group in Québec, Canada.
