= Wiska =

Ukrainian model and retired pornographic actress

- Born: 17 October 1985 (age 40); Gomel, Byelorussian SSR, USSR
- Other names: Vuiska, Wika, Anastasia G, Melody, Mila, Nastia
- Height: 5 ft 7 in (1.70 m)

Anastasiya Pavlivna Gryshai, professionally known as Wiska, (born 17 October 1985) is a Ukrainian model and retired pornographic actress of Belarusian origin. A married mother of three, Anastasiya is the first pornographer to take refuge in the EU (namely the Czech Republic) and apply for a political asylum due to her professional activities.

== Early life and porn career ==
Anastasiya was born in Gomel but grew up in the Crimean city of Feodosia where she met her husband Oleksandr. In 2003, Oleksandr was convicted and imprisoned for 8 years for a vehicle arson. The couple states that imprisonment was the result of a business dispute and the reason for Anastasiya's out-of-need family-supporting porn career. Anastasiya claims her first porn shoot took place in Russia in 2004, where she was paid $500 per week, considerable money for Ukraine at that time.

Between 2004 and 2008, Anastasiya, nicknamed Wiska, starred in over 40 pornographic films, including at least one movie with Rocco Siffredi.

Circa 2007, Wiska's identity was revealed in Ukraine after a family interview for one of the local tabloids, which attracted journalistic interest and launched her as a national celebrity posing for mainstream media.

== Persecution ==
In 2010, Ukrainian authorities began investigating Anastasiya's family living in Feodosia on the legal grounds of child abuse (including forensic examination of her children for possible sexual assault) and production and distribution of pornography (illegal in Ukraine since 2009). The persecution was initiated by Leonid Hrach, then representing the Autonomous Republic of Crimea in Verkhovna Rada. Anastasiya left Crimea with her family and moved to Kyiv where she received support from FEMEN.

== Asylum seeking ==
In December 2012, Anastasiya and her family moved to the Czech Republic and applied for asylum. Although their application for asylum was denied in August 2013, they continued to live in the Czech Republic near Prague and applied for legal residence, which they received on 2 September 2013.
