= The Assistant (2019 film) =

2019 drama film directed by Kitty Green

- Theatrical release poster
- Directed by: Kitty Green
- Written by: Kitty Green
- Produced by: Kitty Green; James Schamus; Scott Macaulay; P. Jennifer Dana; Ross Jacobson
- Starring: Julia Garner; Matthew Macfadyen; Makenzie Leigh; Kristine Froseth; Jon Orsini; Noah Robbins
- Cinematography: Michael Latham
- Edited by: Kitty Green; Blair McClendon
- Music by: Tamar-kali
- Production companies: Symbolic Exchange; 3311 Productions; Level Forward; Cinereach; Forensic Films; Bellmer Pictures; JJ Homeward Productions
- Distributed by: Bleecker Street
- Release dates: August 30, 2019 (Telluride); January 31, 2020 (United States)
- Running time: 87 minutes
- Country: United States
- Language: English
- Budget: $1.7 million
- Box office: $1.4 million

The Assistant is a 2019 American drama film written, directed, produced, and edited by Kitty Green. The film stars Julia Garner as a junior assistant at a film production company with Matthew Macfadyen, Makenzie Leigh, Kristine Froseth, Jon Orsini, and Noah Robbins in supporting roles.

The Assistant premiered at the Telluride Film Festival on August 30, 2019, and was released in the United States on January 31, 2020, by Bleecker Street. It was well-received by critics, who especially praised Garner's performance and the film's claustrophobic depiction of office life.

== Plot ==
The film takes place over the course of a single day in the life of Jane, a junior assistant who has been working at a film production company in New York City for five weeks. She arrives before dawn and performs various menial administrative tasks. Her job's long hours and demanding tasks keep her busy and stressed. During a phone call with her mother, Jane learns that she forgot to call her father on his birthday.

As Jane's day progresses, it becomes clear that her boss has been having sex in his office with women and facilitating a culture of sexual harassment at the company. Many of the male executives make snide comments about the boss's affairs while the female executives handle their own workloads and discuss the possibility of transferring to other departments. Whenever Jane does something her boss deems a mistake, he verbally abuses her over the phone as her two male junior assistant coworkers watch silently. Throughout the day, a variety of people from the boss's life interact with Jane, including his wife, his children's nanny, a famous actor, and a group of Chinese film producers.

In the afternoon, a young, inexperienced woman named Sienna arrives from Idaho, saying she has been offered a job as a junior assistant. Concerned for Sienna's well-being, Jane goes to the human resources department to file a report after dropping Sienna off at a five-star hotel being paid for by the company. Wilcock, the head of HR, encourages Jane to share her concerns, but later makes clear that he is turning a blind eye to her harassment claims, before demeaning her, speaking down to her, and calling her jealous. He also implies that filing a formal complaint would accomplish nothing. As Jane leaves his office, he reminds her that she has nothing to worry about, as Jane is not the boss's "type". Visibly upset, Jane receives a call from her boss when she returns to her desk. He has been informed about her visit to HR and demands she write an email apology addressed to him, which she does. He replies saying that he is especially "tough" on Jane because he knows how great she is.

Toward the end of the day, Sienna arrives at the office so Jane can teach her how to use the phone systems. As night falls, Jane prepares a microwave dinner for herself while other employees leave; her boss stays late in his office with a young actress. Over the intercom, he tells Jane he no longer needs her for the day. Jane goes to a coffee shop across the street and calls her father as she eats a muffin. After she hangs up, she sees a silhouette in her boss's window appearing to have sex.

== Cast ==
- Julia Garner as Jane, a junior assistant at a film production company
- Matthew Macfadyen as Wilcock, the head of the HR department at Jane's company
- Makenzie Leigh as Ruby, an aspiring actress
- Kristine Froseth as Sienna, a newly hired junior assistant
- Alexander Chaplin as Max
- Juliana Canfield as Sasha
- Dagmara Domińczyk as Ellen
- Bregje Heinen as Tatiana
- Clara Wong as Tess
- Patrick Breen as Roy
- Jon Orsini, William T Hendricks and Noah Robbins as Jane's fellow junior assistants
- Purva Bedi as an executive assistant and Jane's immediate boss
- Migs Govea and Daoud Heidami as film executives
- Patrick Wilson as famous actor (uncredited)
- Jay O. Sanders as boss (voice)

== Production ==
In September 2018, it was announced Kitty Green would write and direct the film with James Schamus and Scott Macaulay producing under their Symbolic Exchange banner. Green was inspired to make the film while she was promoting her documentary Casting JonBenét at the Sundance Film Festival in 2017. Members of the press and festival organizers assumed Green got her ideas for the documentary from her male colleagues. The experience nearly led her to leave filmmaking, but she instead decided to "explore the underlying sexism she was exposed to, a subject that initially took the form of sexual misconduct on college campuses but pivoted when the Weinstein story broke."

To prepare for the film, Green spoke with people who had "worked under toxic, often predatory bosses" in the entertainment industry. Her interviews included former assistants at film studios, agencies, and production companies, some of whom had worked at the Weinstein Co. Green "picked up on patterns of women feeling disempowered, threatened or ignored, incorporating them into the screenplay." She said she experienced some early difficulties in getting the film made because it was critical of the film industry. Green said there were several female executives "who really loved it" and said they would recommend it to their colleagues, but then Green received emails back from these executives that said their colleagues were "refusing to even read it".

In December 2018, Julia Garner joined the film's cast. Green cast Garner after seeing her on the TV series The Americans and needing someone "striking" to contrast with the mundanity of the office tasks in the film. In April 2019, Matthew Macfadyen, Kristine Froseth, Makenzie Leigh, Noah Robbins and Dagmara Domińczyk joined the cast. Production concluded that month in New York City.

Although the boss figure is a looming presence in the film, he is never actually seen. Green said, "I was always more interested in the machinery [of the workplace]. We know what happens when the door is closed. We've read those stories. … What I was more interested in was what's on the other side of the door: what people knew, what was going on, the culture in an environment like that." Green also eschewed the use of a score, saying, "the cultural silence [around sexual harassment in the office] is something we were exploring. That quiet was really important to me."

== Release ==
The Assistant premiered at the Telluride Film Festival on August 30, 2019. Shortly afterward, Bleecker Street acquired its distribution rights and released it in theaters on January 31, 2020. It also screened as an official Spotlight selection at the 2020 Sundance Film Festival.

== Reception ==
On Rotten Tomatoes, the film holds an approval rating of 93% based on 242 reviews, with an average rating of 7.7/10. The site's critical consensus reads, "Led by a powerhouse performance from Julia Garner, The Assistant offers a withering critique of workplace harassment and systemic oppression." Metacritic, which uses a weighted average, assigned the film a score of 79 out of 100, based on 43 critics, indicating "generally favorable" reviews.

Writing for The Guardian, Peter Bradshaw called The Assistant "a claustrophobic, intimately unsettling movie" and wrote, "it can claim to be the first drama that addresses the #MeToo issue". In a similarly positive review, Moira Macdonald of the Seattle Times lauded Julia Garner's performance and said the film shone "a light on a malevolent shadow". She also called it "wound taut and perfectly controlled", just like its protagonist, making for an experience that "feels entirely real".

Jeannette Catsoulis of The New York Times called the film "less a #MeToo story than a painstaking examination of the way individual slights can coalesce into a suffocating miasma of harassment", and wrote that Garner's performance "makes the slow draining of Jane's soul almost visible". Justin Chang of NPR concluded that "it's the rigorous understatement of The Assistant that makes it so powerful in its vision of how easily the Harvey Weinsteins of the world could exploit their absolute authority for years with little fear of consequence."

=== Accolades ===
Award	Category	Nominee(s)	Result	Ref.
Boston Society of Film Critics Awards	Best Actress	Julia Garner	runner-up	
Casting Society of America Awards	Outstanding Achievement in Casting - Low Budget Feature - Comedy or Drama	Avy Kaufman, Scotty Anderson	Nominated	
Columbus Film Critics Association Awards	Best Overlooked Film		Nominated	
Columbus Film Critics Association Awards	Breakthrough Film Artist	Kitty Green	Nominated	
Columbus Film Critics Association Awards	Best Actress	Julia Garner	Nominated	
Deauville Film Festival	Grand Special Prize	Kitty Green	Nominated	
Deauville Film Festival	Louis Roederer Foundation's Directing Prize	Kitty Green	Won	
Golden Trailer Awards	Best Drama		Nominated	
Gotham Awards	Best Feature	Kitty Green, Scott Macaulay, James Schamus, P. Jennifer Dana, Ross Jacobson	Nominated	
Gotham Awards	Audience Award	Kitty Green, Scott Macaulay, James Schamus, P. Jennifer Dana, Ross Jacobson	Nominated	
Heartland Film Festival	Truly Moving Picture Award	Kitty Green	Won	
Independent Spirit Awards	Best Female Lead	Julia Garner	Nominated	
Independent Spirit Awards	Best First Screenplay	Kitty Green	Nominated	
Independent Spirit Awards	Best Cinematography	Michael Latham	Nominated	
IndieWire Critics' Poll	ICP Award for Best First Feature		7th place	
St. Louis Film Critics Association Awards	Special Merit (for best scene, cinematic technique or other memorable aspect or moment)		Nominated	
Online Film & Television Association Awards	Best Feature Debut	Kitty Green	Nominated	
Women Film Critics Circle Awards	Adrienne Shelly Award		Nominated	
