= Oksana Shachko =

Ukrainian artist and activist (1987–2018)

Oxana Shachko Оксана Шачко
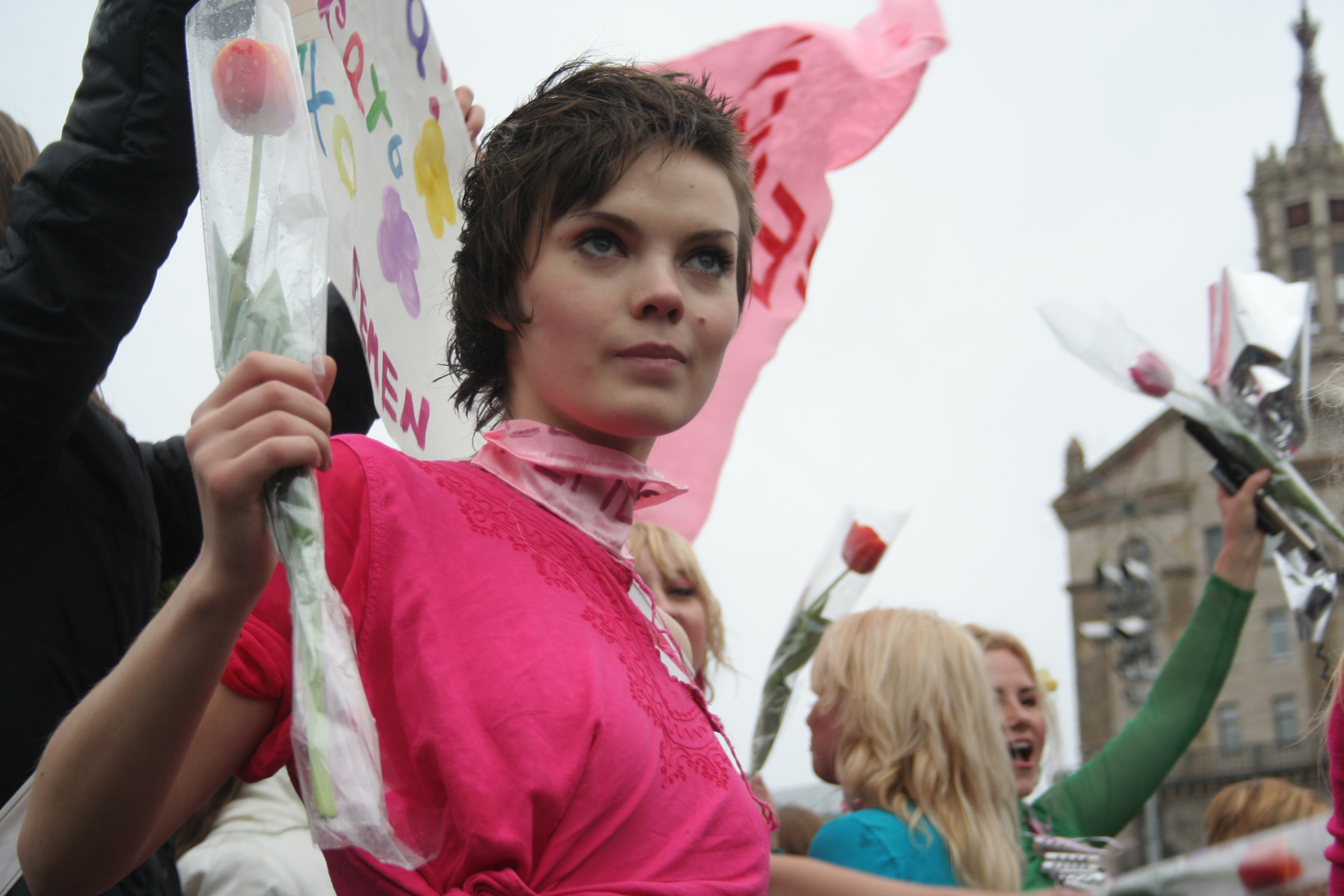
- Shachko, 2009
- Born: 31 January 1987; Khmelnytskyi, Ukrainian SSR, Soviet Union
- Died: 23 July 2018 (aged 31); Paris, France
- Cause of death: Suicide by hanging
- Other names: Oksana Shachko; Oksana Chatchko
- Occupations: Artist; activist
- Years active: 2008–2018

Oksana Shachko (Ukrainian: Оксана Шачко; 31 January 1987 – 23 July 2018) was a Ukrainian artist and activist. Along with Anna Hutsol and Alexandra Shevchenko, she was one of the founders of the radical feminist activist group Femen, which publicly demonstrates in various countries against sexual exploitation, income inequality, and policies of the Roman Catholic Church, among other causes.

== Biography ==
Oksana Shachko was born on 31 January 1987 in Khmelnytsky, a typical Soviet town in the western part of Ukraine, in an Orthodox Christian family. Her parents both worked in a factory and when the Soviet Union collapsed, the factories closed and they both lost their jobs, in the context of a political and economic crisis.

In 1995, at the age of 8, Shachko joined the Nikosh school, normally intended for adults and renowned for its teaching of Orthodox iconography. She graduated from this school and her early artwork was exhibited in several collective exhibitions in Ukraine and in the United States. At the age of twelve, she started painting frescoes, working in the Orthodox church full-time. She then expressed the desire to join a convent and become a nun, but her mother and her family convinced her not to do so.

Later, at the age of 14, she rejected the Orthodox Church and religion and became an atheist, believing that the Orthodox priests behave more like merchants than God's representatives. She continued to paint to earn a living.

In 2000, she joined the free university of Khmelnytsky to study philosophy, which triggered a deep crisis of conscience. At this time, she started feeling upset about the lack of space devoted to women to express their ideas and their creativity. She founded with other students the "Center for New Perspectives", an organisation fighting against corruption and for student rights. At this point, she met Anna Hutsol and Aleksandra Shevchenko. She later indicated in the documentary film I am Femen that this experience forged her political and philosophical conceptions, making her become an activist fighting for women's rights and freedom of expression.

== Activism ==
In 2008, together with Anna Hutsol and Alexandra Shevchenko, Shachko founded the feminist activist group Femen. The group initially protested about issues affecting women students but rapidly moved on to demonstrating against the sexual exploitation of Ukrainian women and against sex tourism in 2008. Initially, Femen gained attention by demonstrating while dressed in underwear: however, in August 2009, Shachko bared her breasts at a protest in Kyiv. Since then, Femen activists have regularly protested topless and broadened their agenda to women's rights and civil rights in Ukraine and around the world.

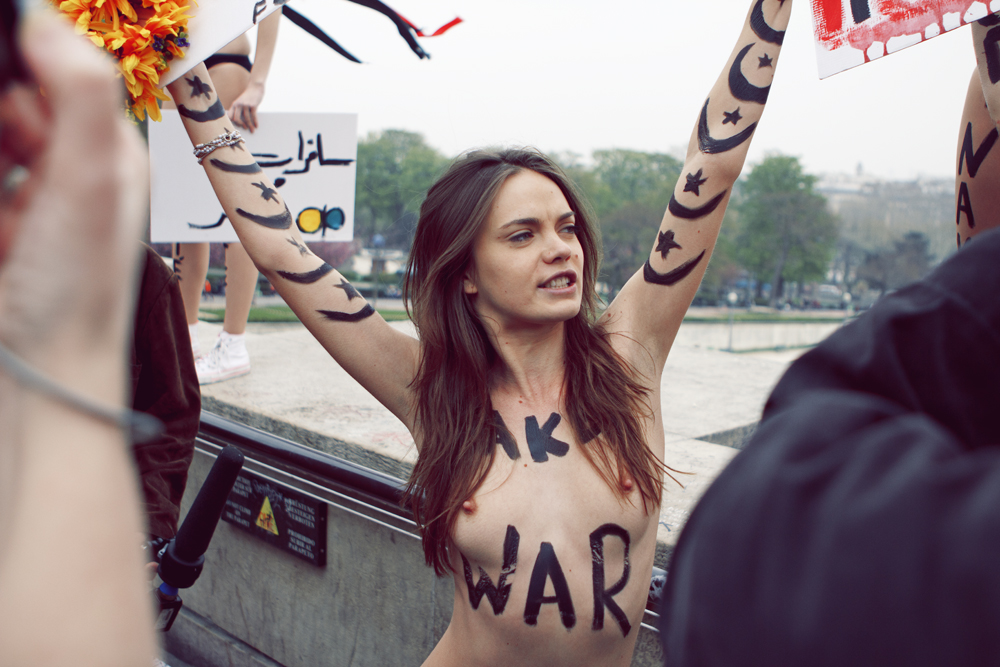
Shachko at a FEMEN protest in support of Aliaa Magda Elmahdy, March 2012

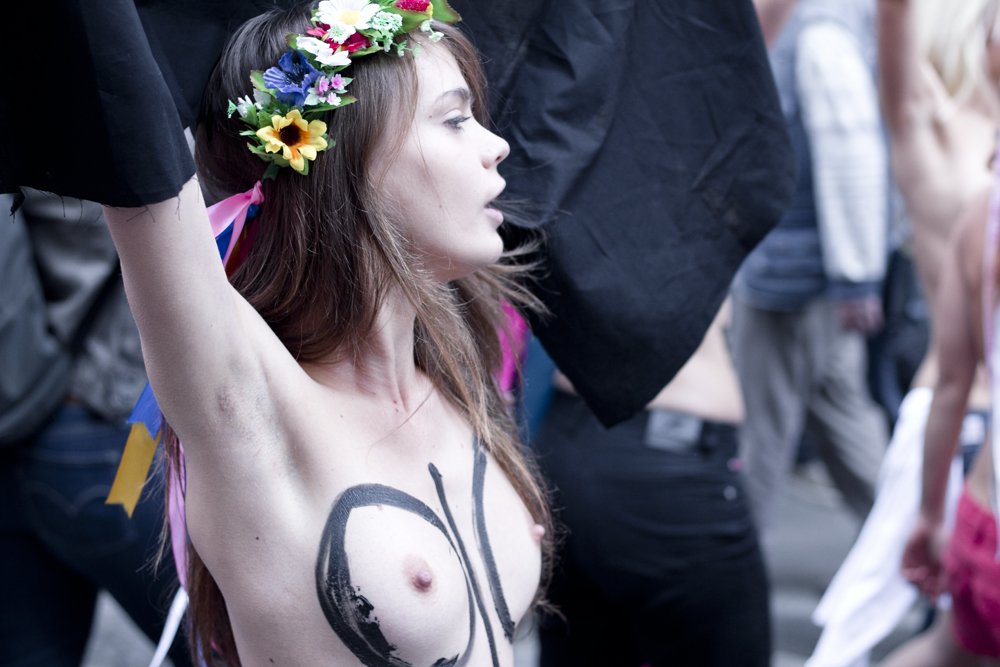
Shachko during another protest in Paris

Members of Femen, including Shachko, were detained on numerous occasions. Probably the worst episode happened in 2011, when a group of activists demanded the release of political prisoners in the Belarusian capital Minsk. Shachko and two other women were kidnapped by the Belarusian KGB, taken to a forest, made to strip, doused with oil and threatened with being set on fire.

Shachko worked together with French writer Galia Ackerman who produced a history of Femen which was published by Calmann-Lévy in 2013. In 2014, the award-winning documentary film about Shachko, Je suis Femen (I am Femen) by filmmaker Alain Margot was released.

France granted her political refugee status in 2013, after several attacks by security forces connected to Vladimir Putin, a target of Femen protests along with the French Front National. She lived in Paris, working as a painter.

== Art ==
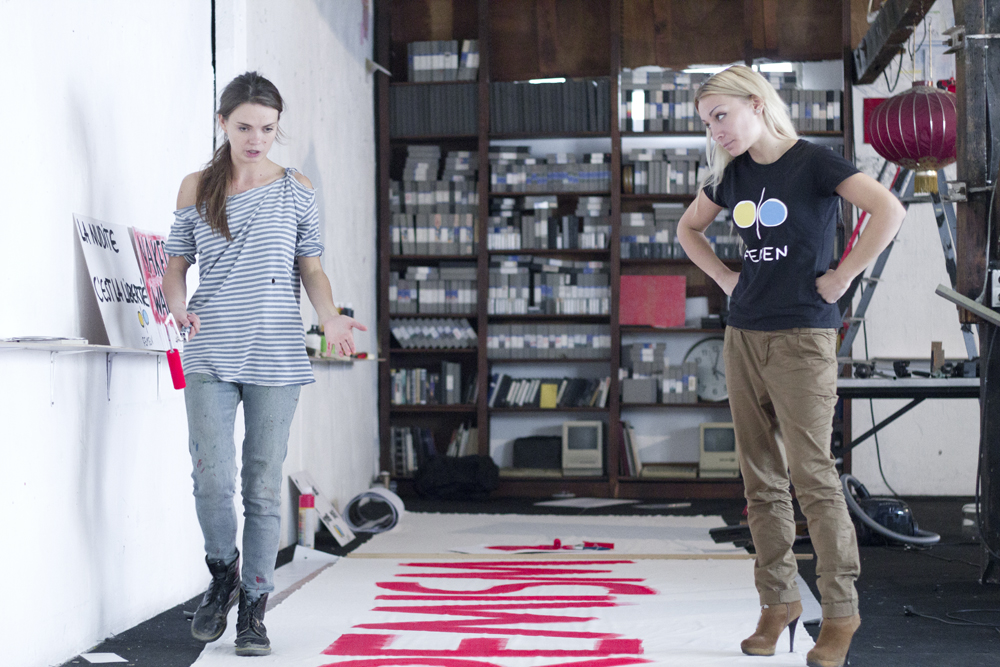
Oksana Shachko and Inna Shevchenko in Paris (2012)

At the time of her death, Shachko was concentrating on her artworks, called Iconoclast: Orthodox icons painted in the traditional method, onto which she introduced transgressive details to confront religious dogma with feminist, political or humanist messages. Shachko had her first solo exhibition in Paris in May 2016.

== Death ==
Shachko was found dead in her apartment in Paris, France, on 23 July 2018. She was 31. Anna Hutsol told Ukrayinska Pravda that friends were awaiting an official report. It was reported that she hanged herself.

Elle profiled Shachko on 1 February 2019. In that profile, they reported that she had made another attempt to hang herself several years earlier.

== Art reviews ==
- "Oksana Shachko: from Femen to painter", by Armelle le Turc, Crash, winter 2017–2018.
- "Oksana Shachko: Counter-Religious Iconography", text by Stacey Batashova, video by Apollonaria Broche, 032C, 4 October 2016.
- "Oksana Shachko, une Femen en pleine crise de foi", by Sabrina Silamo, Télérama on 14 May 2016.
- "Oksana Shachko : l'ex-Femen iconoclaste expose sa Vierge Marie en burqa", by Ronan Tésorière and Amandine Pointel, Le Parisien on 3 June 2016.
- "Elle quitte les Femen pour peindre des icônes religieuses", by Jérémy André and Jérôme Wysocki, Le Point on 13 January 2016.

== Filmography ==
- Je suis Femen (I'm Femen), documentary film (1 hour 35 mins), written and directed by Alain Margot, produced by Caravel Production (Switzerland) and Luminor Films Distribution (France), 2014.
- Naked War, documentary film (58 mins), written and directed by Joseph Paris, produced by La Clairière Production (France), LCP La Chaîne Parlmentaire (France) and Arte Distribution (France/Germany), 2014.
- Nos seins, nos armes! (Our breasts, our weapons!), documentary film (1 hour 10 mins), written and directed by Caroline Fourest and Nadia El Fani, produced by Nilaya Productions, aired on France 2 on 5 March 2013.
- Everyday Rebellion, documentary film (1 hour 58 mins), written and directed by the Riahi Brothers Arash T. Riahi and Arman Riahi, Austria / Switzerland / Germany, 2013.
- Ukraine Is Not a Brothel, a documentary film (78 mins), written and directed by Kitty Green, Australia 2013.
- Apolonia, Apolonia, documentary film (116 minutes) by Lea Glob, production : Danish Documentary Production (Danemark) and Staron Film (Pologne), 2022.
- Oxana Biopic (103 minutes) about Oksana Shachko by Charlène Favier produced by Rectangle Productions France, Ukraine, Hungary, premiered 15 december 2024 at Les Arcs Film Festival Paris.

== Music ==
- La Lumière est Noire (The Light is Black), by Alain Margot (Je suis Femen), Chiara Darbellay, Mathieu Schneider, (2019).

== See also ==
- Nudity and protest
- History of feminism
- Women in Ukraine
