= Ukraine Is Not a Brothel =

2013 documentary film

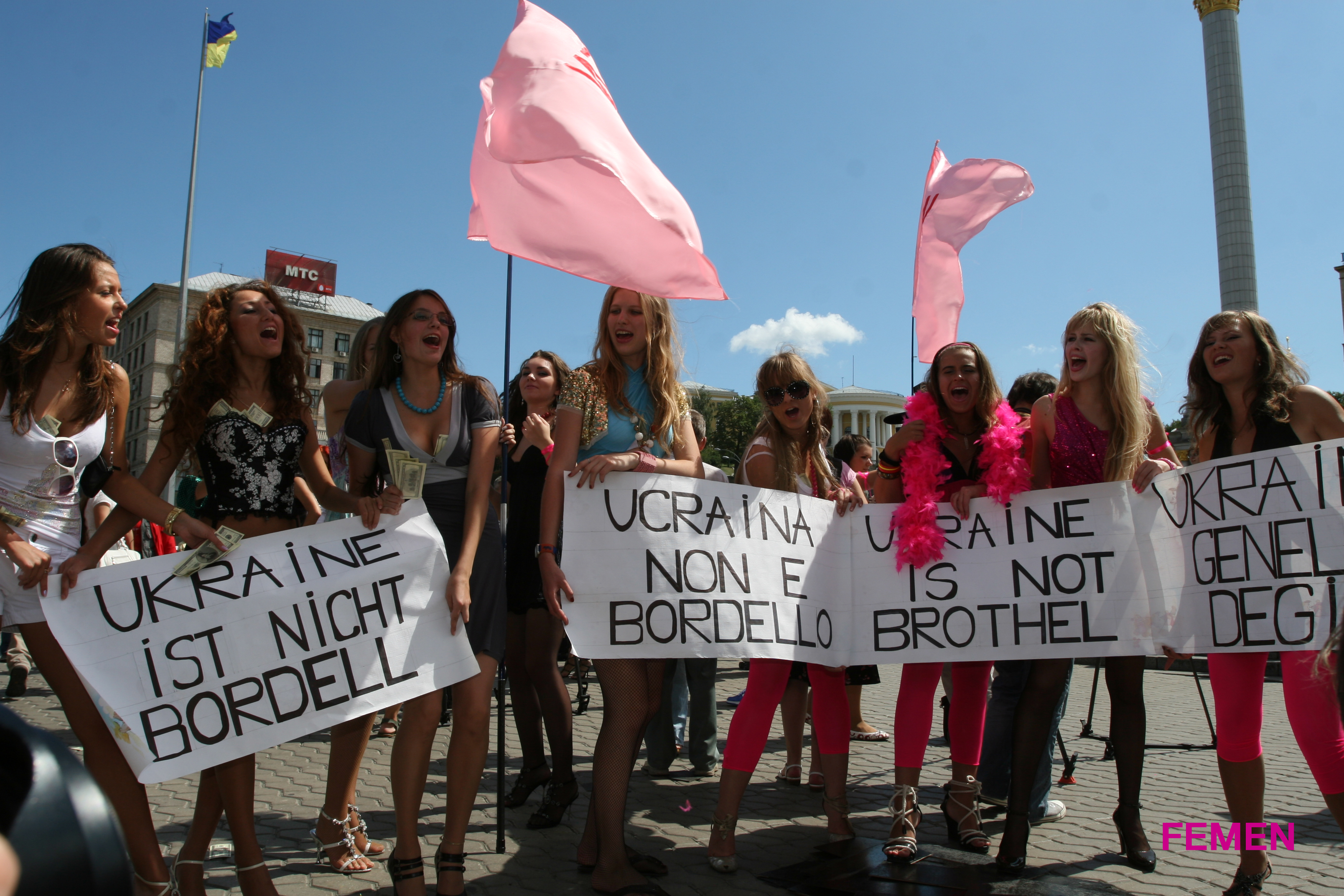
- Femen protest
- Directed by: Kitty Green
- Produced by: Jonathan auf der Heide; Kitty Green; Michael Latham
- Cinematography: Michael Latham
- Edited by: Kitty Green
- Music by: Zoe Barry; Jed Palmer
- Production companies: Noise & Light
- Release date: 4 September 2013 (70th Venice International Film Festival)
- Running time: 78 minutes
- Countries: Australia; Ukraine
- Languages: Ukrainian, Russian, English subtitles

Ukraine Is Not a Brothel (Ukrainian: «Україна не бордель», romanized: Ukraina ne bordel, Russian: «Украина не бордель») is a 2013 Australian documentary film directed by Kitty Green. The film debuted at the 70th Venice International Film Festival, although it was not part of the competition. The documentary concerns the FEMEN (Фемен) movement, a feminist protest group originating from Ukraine.

== Content ==
The film is a documentary on the activities of FEMEN, a Ukrainian feminist movement known for topless protests. The filmmaker Kitty Green followed the activists for over a year, in Ukraine, Belarus and Turkey. It documents the protests and the resulting harassments and arrests over a span of fourteen months. The film showcases the four activists who form the core of the film.

The documentary shows Viktor Sviatsky as a driving force of the group FEMEN. He is the manipulator of all the protests and, in essence, commander of the females.

The activists of FEMEN participated in the promotion of the documentary. They claimed that the situation in the film, i.e. under the leadership of Viktor Sviatsky, is actually part of the past, since he was ejected from the movement in 2012.

== Cast ==
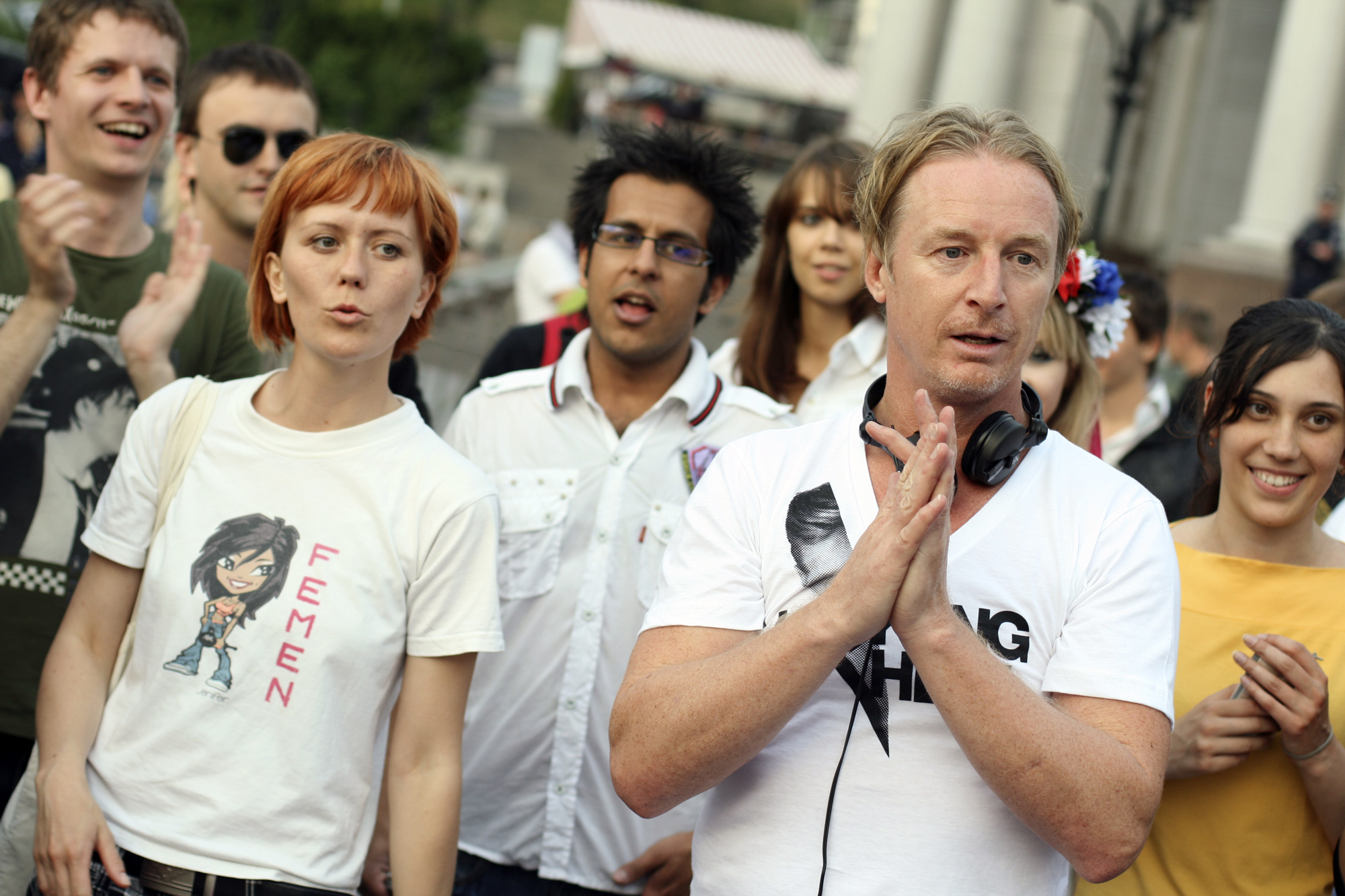
Anna Hutsol (left) during a filmed protest

- Viktor Sviatsky

The four principal women of FEMEN (Фемен):

- Inna Shevchenko (Inna Ševčenko) (Інна Шевченко)
- Alexandra Shevchenko (Aleksandra Shevchenko) (Sasha Shevchenko) (Oleksandra Ševčenko)
- Anna Hutsol (Hanna Hucol) (Ганна Гуцол)
- Oksana Shachko (Oksana Šačko)

== Release ==
The film was screened out of competition at the 70th Venice International Film Festival of Venice. At the festival photocall the activists appeared topless, as is usual for their protests

== Critical reception ==
Glenn Dunks and Christopher Schobert of The Playlist on IndieWire gave the film positive reviews.

=== Accolades ===
On 9 September 2014, Ukraine is Not a Brothel won for the Best Feature Length Documentary by Australian Academy of Cinema and Television Arts, awarded at the 4th AACTA Awards at The Star Event Centre, Sydney, New South Wales in late January 2015

Award	Category	Subject	Result
AACTA Award (4th)	Best Feature Length Documentary	Jonathan auf der Heide	Won
AACTA Award (4th)	Best Feature Length Documentary	Michael Latham	Won
AACTA Award (4th)	Best Feature Length Documentary	Kitty Green	Won
AACTA Award (4th)	Best Direction in a Documentary	Kitty Green	Nominated
AACTA Award (4th)	Best Editing in a Documentary	Kitty Green	Nominated
AACTA Award (4th)	Best Cinematography in a Documentary	Michael Latham	Nominated
AACTA Award (4th)	Best Sound in a Documentary	Doron Kipen	Nominated
AACTA Award (4th)	Best Sound in a Documentary	Jed Palmer	Nominated
AACTA Award (4th)	Best Original Music Score in a Documentary	Jed Palmer	Nominated
AACTA Award (4th)	Best Original Music Score in a Documentary	Zoe Barry	Nominated

== See also ==
- Security Service of Ukraine
- Prostitution in Europe § Ukraine
- Ost-Arbeiter § Ukrainian
- War crimes of the Wehrmacht § Wehrmacht brothel system
- Prostitution in Turkey
- List of Australian films of 2013
