= Kitty Green =

Australian writer and director (born 1984)

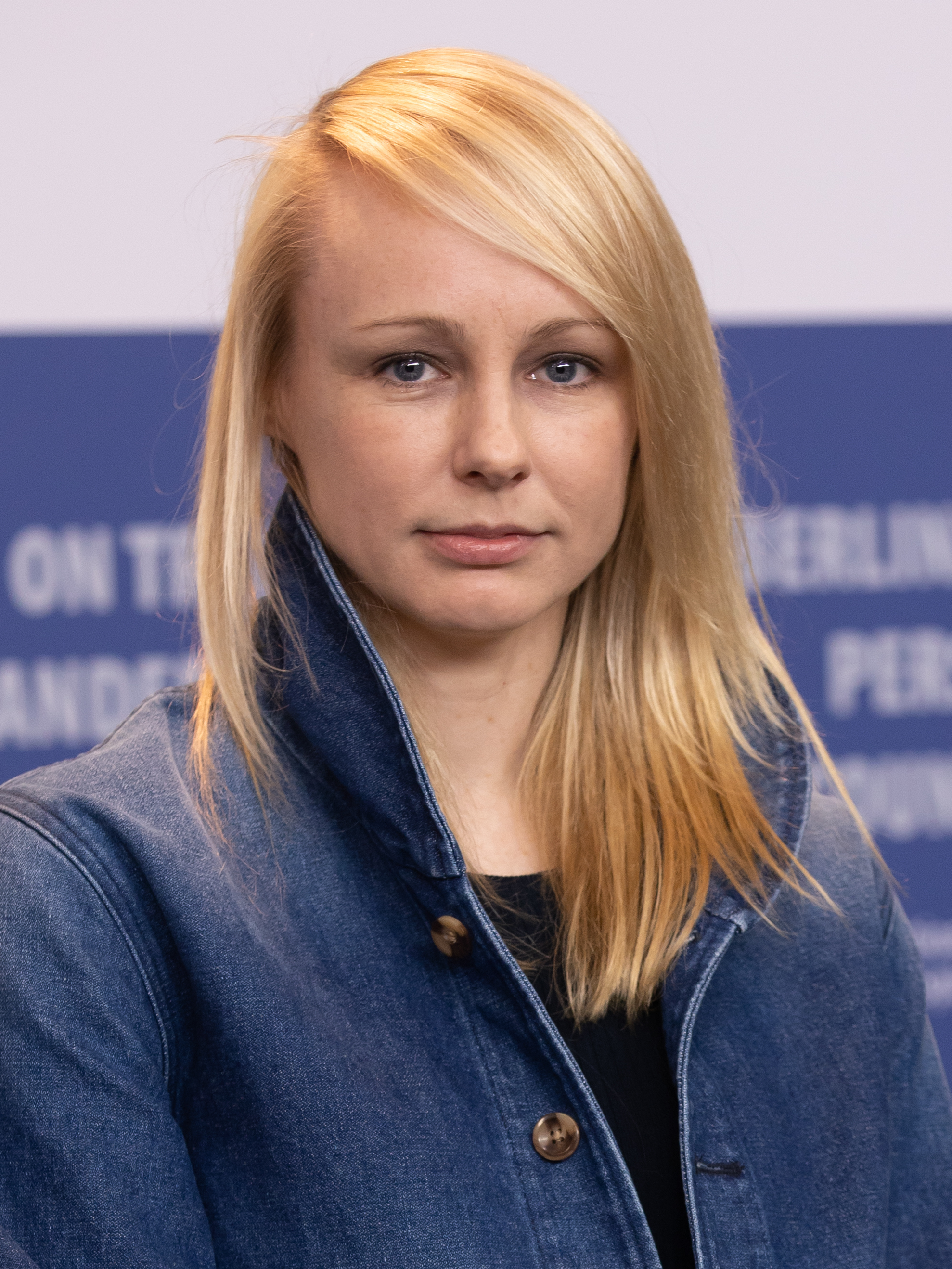
- Green in 2020
- Born: 1984 (age 41–42); Melbourne, Victoria, Australia
- Education: Victorian College of the Arts
- Occupations: Screenwriter; director; editor

Kitty Green (born 1984) is an Australian film director, editor, producer, and screenwriter. The majority of her projects have been documentaries, while two have been narrative-driven stories. Green produced, directed, wrote, and edited the 2019 film The Assistant. Her work often portrays heavy topics such as unsolved murders and politics.

== Early life and education ==
Kitty Green grew up in Melbourne. She attended the Victorian College of the Arts, where she studied film and television. While attending the Victorian College of the Arts, Green made a short film entitled Spilt that was premiered at the Brisbane International Film Festival and screened at festivals internationally, earning a few awards in the process. Soon after her graduation, Green began work at ABC on 'Art Nation' and 'Artscape'. Green also traveled around Europe and described herself as "crashing on couches" during the beginning of her career. She later went to work on a film entitled Van Diemen's Land in 2009, but only in the camera and electrical department, specifically in charge of stills. A few years later she went on to work on her first documentary Ukraine is Not a Brothel, spending a year in her grandmother's native home, Ukraine. During the filming she was arrested by the SBU and faced what she described as "a ferocious media circus" when the film released. She and two other protesters were forcefully taken and abducted by officers, and were held in a SBU office for lengthy interrogations. Green's friends and family were highly concerned about her disappearance, and say she is extremely lucky to have come out of the situation safely.

Her film Ukraine Is Not A Brothel focuses on the Ukrainian feminist movement "Femen". The film won an AACTA award for Best Australian Feature Documentary. She also won an award for her short film The Face of Ukraine: Casting Oksana Baiul for Best Non-Fiction Short Film at the Sundance Film Festival.

Later on in 2017 Green moved to the United States to work on her documentary Casting JonBenét and currently resides there.

== Career ==
Soon after graduating from the Victorian College of the Arts, Green worked at ABC on 'Art Nation' and 'Artscape', where she shot, edited, and produced documentary content for national broadcast. Later she worked on Van Diemen's Land (2009) in the camera and electrical department.

Green directed the following documentaries:

- Casting JonBenét (2017),
- Ukraine Is Not a Brothel (2013),
- The Face of Ukraine: Casting Oksana Baiul (2015).

She also helped on the documentary Austin to Boston as an editor in 2014.

Green directed The Assistant, a film about an assistant in the film industry who is faced with a moral dilemma in relation to the #MeToo movement.

Her feature film The Royal Hotel was released in 2023, to positive reviews.

== Filmography ==
While it is unclear when Green released it, she did make a student film entitled Spilt.

Documentary film

Year	Title	Director	Producer	Writer	Editor
2013	Ukraine Is Not a Brothel	Yes	Yes	Yes	Yes
2014	Austin to Boston	No	No	No	Yes
2015	The Face of Ukraine: Casting Oksana Baiul	Yes	Yes	Yes	Yes
2017	Casting JonBenet	Yes	Yes	Yes	No

Feature film

Year	Title	Director	Writer	Producer	Editor
2019	The Assistant	Yes	Yes	Yes	Yes
2023	The Royal Hotel	Yes	Yes	No	No

== Awards and nominations ==
Green did receive a few awards for her student film Spilt but an official list of nominations and awards are not currently available for this film.

Green won an AACTA award for Best Australian Feature Documentary for the documentary film Ukraine Is Not A Brothel.

Green also won Best Non-Fiction Short Film at the Sundance Film Festival in 2015 for the short film The Face of Ukraine: Casting Oksana Baiul.

Australian Academy of Cinema and Television Arts (AACTA) Awards
Year	Award	Category	Nominated work	Result
2015	AACTA Award	Best Feature Length Documentary	Ukraine Is Not a Brothel	Won
2015	AACTA Award	Best Direction in a Documentary	Ukraine Is Not a Brothel	Nominated
2015	AACTA Award	Best Editing in a Documentary	Ukraine Is Not a Brothel	Nominated
2017	AACTA Award	Best Feature Length Documentary	Casting JonBenet	Won
2017	AACTA Award	Best Direction in a Documentary	Casting JonBenet	Nominated

Cinema Eye Honors Awards, US
Year	Award	Category	Nominated work	Result
2016	Cinema Eye Honors Award	Outstanding Achievement in Nonfiction Short Filmmaking	The Face of Ukraine: Casting Oksana Baiul	Nominated
2018	Cinema Eye Honors Award	Outstanding Achievement in Direction	Casting JonBenet	Nominated

Year	Award	Category	Nominated work	Result
2013	Venice Film Festival	Special Mention	Ukraine is Not a Brothel	Won
2013	London Film Festival	Grierson Award	Ukraine is Not a Brothel	Nominated
2014	SXSW Film Festival	Audience Award	Ukraine is Not a Brothel	Nominated
2014	Bushwick Film Festival	Best Documentary Feature	Ukraine is Not a Brothel	Won
2015	AFI Fest	Grand Jury Prize	The Face of Ukraine: Casting Oksana Baiul	Nominated
2015	Berlin International Film Festival	Crystal Bear	The Face of Ukraine: Casting Oksana Baiul	Nominated
2015	Sundance Film Festival	Short Film Grand Jury Prize	The Face of Ukraine: Casting Oksana Baiul	Nominated
2015	Sundance Film Festival	Short Film Jury Prize	The Face of Ukraine: Casting Oksana Baiul	Won
2017	Sundance Film Festival	Grand Jury Prize	Casting JonBenet	Nominated
2021	Independent Spirit Awards	Best First Screenplay	The Assistant	Nominated
