= Château Rouge =

Castle in Liège Province, Belgium

- Wanze, Liège Province, Wallonia, Belgium

Site information
- Type: Château
- Condition: Abandoned

Location
- Coordinates: 50.5195°N 5.186°E

Château Rouge (French pronunciation: [ʃato ʁuʒ], Red Castle) is a château in the ancienne commune of Bas-Oha, Wanze, Liège Province, Wallonia, Belgium.

The original castle was built in the 11th century, and served as the residence for a religious community. Gutted by a fire in 1885, the current structure was built within the original walls, though the red colour may be an addition to these outer walls during this 19th century rebuild.

Château Rouge, now abandoned, was last used as a nursing home.

== See also ==
- List of castles in Belgium
- urban exploration photography of Chateau Rouge
