= Anna Hutsol =

Ukrainian feminist

Anna Hutsol Ганна Гуцол
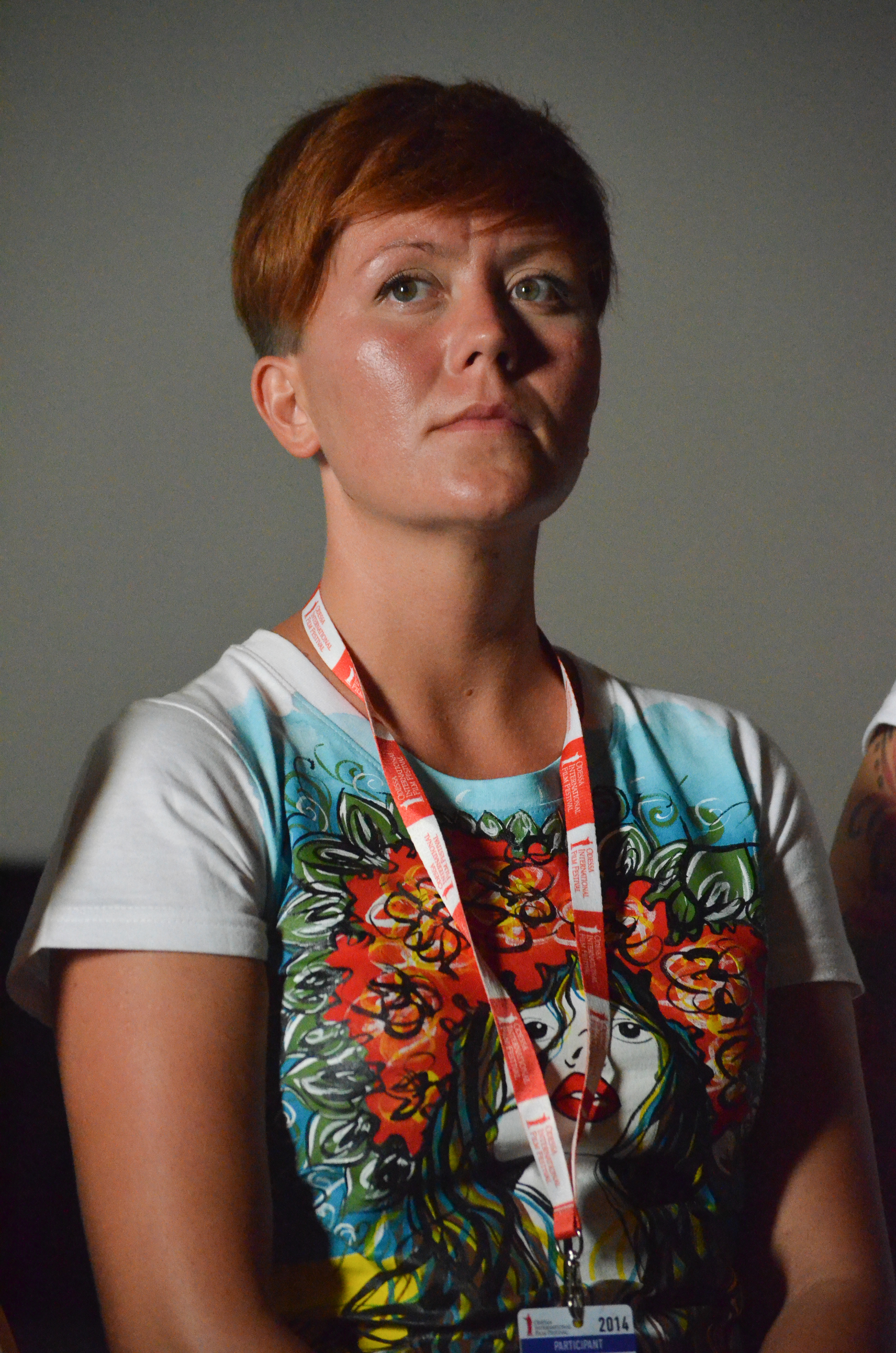
- Hutsol in 2014
- Born: 16 October 1984 (age 42); Murmansk, Russian SFSR, Soviet Union
- Occupation: Activist
- Years active: 2008–present

Anna Hutsol (Note: Anna Hutsol uses the Russian version (for example on her Personal blog on Echo of Moscow) of her first name (Анна), rather than the Ukrainian version (Ганна; Hanna) and spells her name in English as 'Anna Hutsol' on her Facebook page) (Anna Vasylivna Hutsol; born 16 October 1984) is a Ukrainian activist and one of the founders of the radical feminist activist group FEMEN.

== Biography ==
Hutsol was born in Russia but moved to Ukraine with her parents in 1991. (Note: Both Russia and Ukraine were part of the Soviet Union since 1920 till Ukraine declared its independence from the Soviet Union on 24 August 1991; Hutsol's parents moved to Ukraine at the end of 1991. (Sources: A History of Ukraine • The Land and Its Peoples, by Paul Robert Magocsi, University of Toronto Press, 2010, ISBN 1442610212 (pages 563/564 & 722/723) & Ackerman, Gail (2013), Femen (Calmann-Levy), pp 45, 46, ISBN 9782702144589.)) She is an economist and a former assistant to singer Tina Karol.

Hutsol founded FEMEN in 2008 after she became attuned to the sad stories of Ukrainian women duped by false promises from abroad: "I set up FEMEN because I realised that there was a lack of women activists in our society; Ukraine is male-oriented and women take a passive role." According to Hutsol the skills she acquired during her time with Tina Karol have helped FEMEN's "public relations". FEMEN's main choice of action is topless demonstrations. The group started protesting against prostitution in Ukraine and broadened their agenda to women's rights and civil rights in Ukraine and around the world.

Hutsol wanted to seek representation for FEMEN in the Verkhovna Rada in January 2011; but FEMEN did not take part in the October 2012 Ukrainian parliamentary election.

On 16 November 2012 Hutsol was detained by the Federal Security Service (FSB) of the Russian Federation at Pulkovo Airport in Saint Petersburg as a person barred from entering Russia. She was deported back to her point of departure Paris.

Late August 2013 Shevchenko and several fellow FEMEN-members have fled out of Ukraine fearing for their lives and freedom. Hutsol requested for asylum in Switzerland in 2013, but the authorities rejected her request on 27 March 2014.

== Filmography ==
- Nos seins, nos armes! (Our breasts, our weapons!), documentary film (Length: 1:10:00), written and directed by Caroline Fourest and Nadia El Fani, produced by Nilaya Productions, aired on France 2 on 5 March 2013.
- Everyday Rebellion, documentary film (Length: 1:58:00), written and directed by the Riahi Brothers Arash T. Riahi and Arman Riahi, Austria / Switzerland / Germany, 2013, world premiere at Copenhagen International Documentary Festival on 13 November 2013.
- Ukraine Is Not a Brothel, 2013, documentary film.
- Je Suis Femen (I Am Femen), 2014, documentary film, written and directed by Alain Margot.

== See also ==
- Nudity and protest
- Women's rights in Ukraine
