= Green Border =

2023 film by Agnieszka Holland

- Theatrical release poster
- Polish: Zielona granica
- Directed by: Agnieszka Holland
- Written by: Maciej Pisuk; Gabriela Łazarkiewicz-Sieczko; Agnieszka Holland
- Produced by: Marcin Wierzchoslawski; Fred Bernstein; Agnieszka Holland
- Starring: Jalal Altawil; Maja Ostaszewska; Tomasz Włosok; Behi Djanati Atai; Mohamad Al Rashi; Dalia Naous; Maciej Stuhr; Agata Kulesza
- Cinematography: Tomasz Naumiuk
- Edited by: Pavel Hrdlička
- Music by: Frédéric Vercheval
- Production companies: Metro Films; Astute Films; Blick Productions; Marlene Film Production; Beluga Tree
- Distributed by: Kino Świat (Poland); Bioscop (Czech Republic); Condor Distribution (France); September Film (Belgium)
- Release dates: 5 September 2023 (Venice); 22 September 2023 (Poland); 7 February 2024 (France)
- Running time: 147 minutes
- Countries: Poland; Czech Republic; France; Belgium
- Languages: Polish; Arabic; English; French
- Box office: US$4.2 million

Green Border (Polish: Zielona granica) is a 2023 drama film directed by Agnieszka Holland. The film is written by Holland, Gabriela Łazarkiewicz-Sieczko, and Maciej Pisuk, and stars an ensemble cast that includes Jalal Altawil, Maja Ostaszewska, Behi Djanati Atai, Tomasz Włosok, Mohamad Al Rashi, Dalia Naous, Maciej Stuhr, and Agata Kulesza. It dramatizes the plight of migrants caught in the Belarus–European Union border crisis. The film was an international co-production between companies in Poland, Czech Republic, France, and Belgium.

The film competed for the Golden Lion at the 80th Venice International Film Festival, where it won the Special Jury Prize. It received positive reviews from critics but was condemned by the then right-wing Polish government officials and by some segments of the wider Polish nation. It was released in Poland on 22 September 2023 by Kino Świat.

== Plot ==
In 2021, a Syrian refugee family—parents Bashir and Amina, their three children Nur, Ghalia, and an infant, with Bashir's grandfather Mohamed—arrive at an airport in Minsk, Belarus. The group plans to cross the open 'green border' from Belarus to Poland, go through Germany, then meet a relative of theirs in Sweden. Leila, an English-speaking refugee from Afghanistan, accompanies them. Once the group arrives at the Polish border, they are forced out of their transport van and made to cross on foot into the forest. They are eventually found by the Polish authorities and forcibly transported through the barbed wire fence back to Belarus. In one altercation, the Polish guards throw a pregnant African refugee over the barbed wire, injuring her.

Jan, a young soon-to-be father, is a member of the Polish border patrol. The commander instructs the guards to send all migrants back to Belarus, and that they are merely Belarusian dictator Alexander Lukashenko's weapons in an attempt to provoke the EU by opening the border. A recording of the pregnant woman being violently thrown over the fence hits the news, and his wife questions his employment as a guard. When not working, he renovates an old abandoned house, which he discovers refugees are squatting in when he isn't there. While patrolling at night, he and another guard discover the dead body of a pregnant refugee. Instructed to ignore the dead bodies of migrants at the border, the two dispose of her body over the fence. Jan, disturbed and conflicted, has an emotional breakdown in his car.

A group of activists who seek to aid the migrants find the group in the woods, providing them fresh clothes, food, water, and medical attention. Due to laws surrounding the exclusion zone and risks of human trafficking charges, the activists are unable to help the migrants any further. Once again, the migrants are taken back to the Belarusian border, where the Belarusian police threaten to open fire. During the scuffle, Nur and Leila escape into the woods.

Julia, a widowed therapist who lives close to the border, hears cries for help coming from the woods. She finds Leila and an unconscious Nur slowly sinking into deep mud in the swamp. Julia calls for help, but Nur slips completely into the mud and drowns. Leila is ejected from the hospital and detained by the Polish authorities; it is left uncertain what becomes of her. Traumatized by the experience, Julia decides to join the activists. They discover a Moroccan refugee abandoned in the woods with an injured leg. Unable to take him back on foot, the activists agree to leave him there overnight, but Julia returns alone in the night to find that he has disappeared, and she is arrested for entering the exclusion zone. After being released from jail, Julia decides she's never leaving anyone behind ever again. One of her patients, Bogdan, takes in several French-speaking teenage migrants from Africa, who bond with Bogdan's teenage children over a shared taste in music.

The Syrian family, devastated after Nur's death, come into contact with a human smuggler who conceals them in the back of his truck. They are stopped by two Polish officers, one of them being Jan. Jan inspects the vehicle and spots Bashir in the back of the truck, but he ignores him and lets them go.

In the epilogue, after the 2022 Russian invasion of Ukraine, Ukrainian refugees are shown entering Poland with ease, in stark contrast to the cruelty that the previous migrants were subjected to at the Polish-Belarusian border.

== Cast ==
- Jalal Altawil as Bashir
- Maja Ostaszewska as Julia
- Tomasz Włosok as Jan
- Behi Djanati Atai as Leila
- Mohamad Al Rashi as Grandpa
- Dalia Naous as Amina
- Piotr Stramowski as Maciek
- Jaśmina Polak as Zuku
- Marta Stalmierska as Ula
- Agata Kulesza
- Maciej Stuhr
- Magdalena Popławska
- Joely Mbundu
- Monika Frajczyk as Marta
- Taim Ajjan as Nur
- Talia Ajjan as Ghalia

== Production ==
Green Border is a co-production between Poland, France, the Czech Republic and Belgium. It was produced by Marcin Wierzchosławski (Metro Films), Fred Bernstein (Astute Films), and Agnieszka Holland. It was co-produced by Maria Blicharska, Damien McDonald (Blick Productions), Šárka Cimbalová (Marlene Film Production) and Diana Elbaum, David Ragonig (Beluga Tree). The film is supported by Eurimages, the Czech Film Fund, the Centre national du cinéma et de l'image animée (CNC), Sofica La Banque Postale Image 17, the Centre du Cinema et de L'Audiovisuel de la Federation Wallonie Bruxelles, CANAL+ Poland, Czech Television and ZDF/ARTE.

Holland made the decision to begin work on the film in September 2021; she and her two fellow screenwriters, Maciej Pisuk and Gabriela Łazarkiewicz-Sieczko, "documented [the border crisis] very deeply" when writing the screenplay, with this research including hundreds of hours of document analysis and of interviews with refugees, borderland residents, activists and experts, as well as testimony by anonymous Polish Border Guard officers. While Holland wanted to start filming as soon as the screenplay was finished, financial pressures meant that she had to wait a year to do so. It was decided that the film would be shot in black-and-white as it was thought that to do so would be "metaphorical, and somehow connected to the past, the Second World War, documentary-like", in addition to allowing for better visual and artistic control considering the shooting and editing schedule.

Principal photography was conducted between April and May 2023; it lasted for twenty-four days and involved three units (Holland's unit being the primary one). Many film crew members took "low or no salaries". Holland claimed that "[e]verything that happens in the film is documented; nothing is invented", but added that she and the other filmmakers "did some construction" and that the film's characters are "inspired by real people but composed".

The film was produced by Marcin Wierzchoslawski, Fred Bernstein, and Agnieszka Holland. Cinematography was by Tomasz Naumiuk, editing by Pavel Hrdlička, and the music was composed by Frédéric Vercheval.

== Release ==
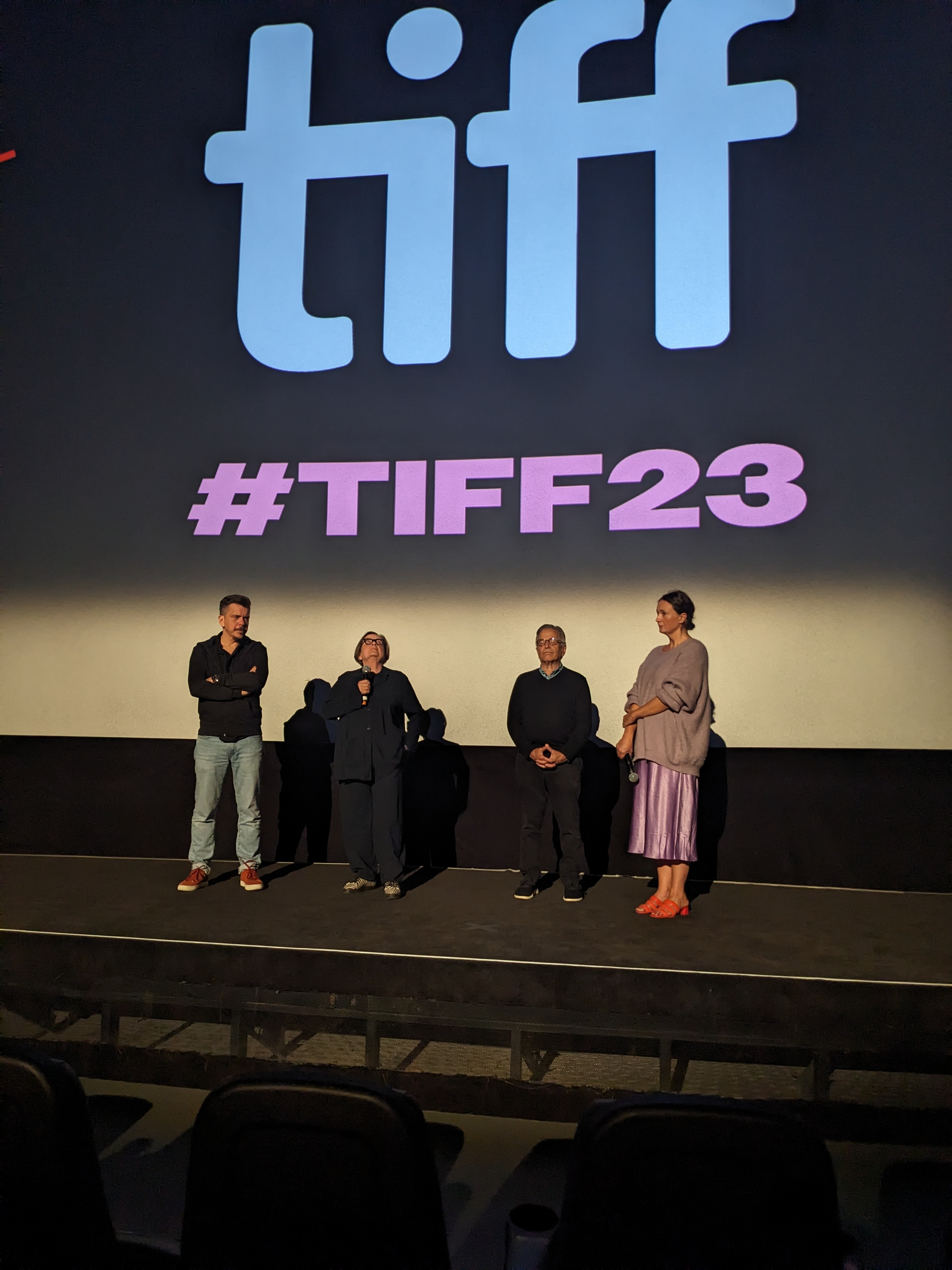
Director Agnieszka Holland (second from left) on stage at the Toronto International Film Festival in September 2023

Green Border was selected to compete for the Golden Lion at the 80th Venice International Film Festival, where it had its world premiere on 5 September 2023. Following screenings at the 2023 Toronto International Film Festival, 2023 Vancouver International Film Festival and 2023 New York Film Festival. It was also invited at the 28th Busan International Film Festival in 'Icon' section and was screened on 7 October 2023. The film will be screened at the Vatican as part of the 27th Tertio Millenio Film Festival in November 2023, being announced as the winner of the festival's Special Fuoricampo Prize beforehand.

The film was theatrically released in Poland by Kino Świat on 22 September 2023. By government order, "studio cinemas" (Polish: Kina studyjne - these are generally independent cinemas that receive government backing) seeking to screen the film were required to show a video presenting the government perspective on the border crisis prior to the actual screening. In Otwock, a cinema (Kino Oaza) that was due to show the film later removed it from its schedule. Kino Oaza is run by Otwock's city council, which claimed that the cinema is often forced to change its schedule or suspend screenings entirely due to having to share its premises with a playhouse; however, the city mayor, Jarosław Margielski, is a Law and Justice member and so at least one councillor suggested the possibility of politically motivated censorship. As Kino Oaza is the only cinema in Otwock, the cancellation of its screenings of Green Border means that residents would only be able to see the film if they travelled to another locality. Agnieszka Holland retorted that Law and Justice ended up losing local elections in Ostrołęka after that city's council acted similarly to prevent screenings of Kler. In Kędzierzyn-Koźle, the Nicolaus Copernicus Second General Education Liceum (Polish: II Liceum Ogólnokształcącego im. Mikołaja Kopernika) was due to send its pupils to a screening of the film, but this was blocked by Law and Justice supporters whose children were enrolled with the liceum. The idea of a school trip to see the film was originally that of Marzanna Gądek-Radwanowska, a teacher at the liceum who also happened to be a Civic Platform candidate in the then-upcoming parliamentary election.

International sales are handled by Films Boutique. Distribution rights were purchased by Condor Distribution (France), September Film (Benelux), Movies Inspired (Italy), Leopardo Filmes (Portugal), MCF Megacom (the Balkans), and AQS (Czech Republic and Slovakia), as well as by Vercine (Spain), Panda Lichtspiele (Austria), Kino Pavasaris (the Baltics), Art Fest (Bulgaria), Magic Box (Slovakia), Fivia (Slovenia), Vertigo (Hungary), Bíó Paradís (Iceland), Transformer Inc. (Japan), Piffl Medien (Germany), Lev Cinema (Israel), Trigon (Switzerland), Moving Turtle (Middle East and North Africa), Danaos Films (Greece), Arthouse Traffic (Ukraine), Kino Lorber (United States) and Modern Films (United Kingdom).

== Reception ==
=== Critical response ===
On the review aggregator website Rotten Tomatoes, the film holds an approval rating of 94% based on 94 reviews. The website's consensus reads, "With unyielding clarity, Green Border renders a compassionate portrait of the unmerciful landscape that flanks the Polish-Belarusian border." Metacritic, which uses a weighted average, assigned the film a score of 90 out of 100, based on 29 critics, indicating "universal acclaim".

==== Non-Polish reviews ====
The Guardian's Peter Bradshaw assessed the film as being a difficult but vital cinematic experience. Jo-Ann Titmarsh of the London Evening Standard praised Holland for unsubtly displaying her "righteous indignation", but not letting it overpower the film. Rodrigo Perez of The Playlist similarly called it a "righteous, masterful work, arguably her best since Europa Europa." Leslie Felperin of The Hollywood Reporter hailed the execution and precision of the film's multiple storylines, which she wrote "make for a bracing, impassioned skein of humanist cinema, old-school in technique but right up to the moment in terms of its subject matter." Screen International's Wendy Ide echoed praise of the film's "supremely confident handling of a fractured, fragmented structure and its twin driving forces of compassion and fury."

In a less favourable review, Kevin Maher of The Times acknowledged the film as "expertly made, and harrowing", but criticized its dialogue as "podium-speak, ramming manifestos into the mouths of characters and transforming every scene into a Manichean struggle between the forces of darkness and light." Maher ultimately panned the film as being nothing more than misery porn, lacking the nuance of other modern refugee dramas such as For Sama (2019), Flee (2021) and Tori and Lokita (2022).

=== Polish government response ===
==== Government ministers ====
Green Border was consistently criticised by ministers from the Law and Justice-led Second Cabinet of Mateusz Morawiecki:

- Zbigniew Ziobro, Minister of Justice, condemned the film ahead of its Venice premiere, writing on X that "In the Third Reich, the Germans produced propaganda films showing Poles as bandits and murderers. Today they have Agnieszka Holland for that." In a subsequent Radio Maryja interview, Ziobro further condemned Holland as having made herself part of Russian propaganda and disinformation and as "preparing a film that distorts the image and shows Poland from the worst angle." Some time after Holland announced that she would be suing him, Ziobro used a wPolscePL interview to make new comments, stating that his earlier comments were made deliberately, they were "exactly what I think", and he would not back down from them. In reference to Holland's threats to sue, Ziobro stated that the Last Judgement took precedence over any eventual court judgement and went on to accuse her of "reduc[ing] Polish soldiers [and] border guard officers to the level of criminals and sadists" and of hypocritically comparing these and the Polish government to Nazis. He did, however, say that his comments were less about the film itself and more about Holland's views as expressed in interviews about the film, as well as admitting he had yet to see the film in person. When a court injunction was issued to prevent him from making further comparisons of Holland and her film to Nazi propaganda, he denounced it as an "assault on freedom of expression" and said that the judgement enabled Holland to "compare Polish soldiers and the border guard officers to bandits, sadists and German Nazis" while not allowing him to "respond to her words by standing up for the Polish soldiers and border guard officers who are so horribly challenged and insulted by her."
- Mariusz Kamiński, Minister of the Interior and Administration, branded the film as a "brutal attack on Polish uniformed officers [who are] defending not only Poland but also Europe" and as "consciously manipulat[ing] our emotions". In a later TVP Info interview, Kamiński claimed that the film was "a presentation of Holland's political views that has nothing to do with reality", that it was "intellectually dishonest and morally shameful", and that it downplayed the Belarusian angle. Kamiński stated his intention to make a further statement once the film had had its Polish premiere where "[the government] will show how this is a deceitful picture, this isn't an existent reality".
- Stanisław Żaryn, Secretary of State at the Chancellery of the Prime Minister of Poland and Government Plenipotentiary for the Security of Information Space, claimed that the film was repeating narratives presented in Russian and Belarusian propaganda, that said Belarusian propaganda was delighted by the film, and that the film was falsely painting Poland as condemning refugees to die.
- Przemysław Czarnek, Minister of Science and Higher Education, sarcastically thanked Holland for making the film and called it yet another phase of "spitting on [...] everyone who risks their life and limb to guard the border twenty-four hours a day" and yet another example of what "that side represented by Gazeta Wyborcza" supposedly thought of Poland's uniformed services. He would later declare that, for "slandering Polish services, the Polish military, spitting on the Polish state", Holland and her "political helpers" did not have the right to call themselves Poles.
- Marcin Przydacz, Head of the International Policy Bureau of the Chancellery of the President, said it was obvious from the beginning that the film would present a biased view of the border crisis.
- Michał Dworczyk, Chief of the Chancellery, said that the film was "extremely dishonest" and was concerned not just with "presenting a false picture" but also with causing problems for and discrediting the Polish government.
- Błażej Poboży, Undersecretary of State in the Ministry of the Interior and Administration, said that the best way to describe the film was as a "disgusting libel" and that the film portrayed "those who risk their lives to defend the Polish border in an extremely unfair manner", was "harmful to the Polish state and to Poles", and contained "so many untruths and distortions". It was Poboży who would announce the government's intention to make independent "studio" cinemas show a short video on "elements that were missing in this film [...] the context of the hybrid operation, the course of this operation, and the measures we have introduced to guarantee the safety of Poles" prior to screenings; in his view, the "most important element" missing from the film was any reference to Belarusian and Russian involvement in the border crisis.

Holland responded to Ziobro's comments by saying that the government was afraid of her film's depiction of the crisis. She called Ziobro's comments defamation and announced that she would be pursuing legal action for the same and for hate speech unless she received an apology within seven days. At the film's Warsaw premiere, Holland spoke more generally about government criticism of her, saying that she had expected hatred to come her way for making the film "but not so brutally and from the highest government bodies [...] we are no longer in the country we would like to be in if the highest authorities direct a hate campaign against the creator and the film." Gazeta Wyborcza published an open letter with over 500 signatories condemning the attacks by public officials and expressing full solidarity with Holland. Virtually all ministerial comments were made prior to the film's release or otherwise without seeing the full film and were therefore based mostly on the film's trailer and other promotional materials as well as second-hand accounts.

==== Border Guard ====
On 8 September 2023, a union representing members of the Polish Border Guard's Nadwiśle division published a press release titled ""Green Border" - Only pigs go to the cinema" (Polish: ""Zielona Granica" - tylko świnie siedzą w kinie") in which they lambasted the film as, among other things, being "a scandalous, anti-Polish film [...] that glorifies the pathological phenomenon of illegal immigration", being a "propaganda product", and slandering the Polish state as an "inhumane dictatorship" and Poles who were patrolling the Belarusian-Polish border as "soulless guard dogs of an oppressive regime". The authors of the press release claimed that to distribute the film was to incur "disgrace and the deepest contempt" and, in criticising Holland's portrayal of engineers, doctors, and writers being among the migrants, challenged her to tell Border Guard officers that the thrown objects they were being attacked with were merely "calipers, stethoscopes, and pen nibs". The phrase "Only pigs go to the cinema" (Polish: "Tylko świnie siedzą w kinie") was originally associated with opposition to Nazi propaganda films screened in Poland during its occupation by Nazi Germany; its usage in the press release thus formed yet another part of efforts to compare Holland's work to such propaganda.

Anna Michalska, a Border Guard lieutenant who often serves as a spokeswoman for the service, said that while the press release was merely the opinion of the union members rather than the actual Nadwiśle Border Guard division, many Border Guard officers were indignant at what she called a "shameful and harmful film"; likewise, she said that, while the Border Guard respects artistic freedom, the film did not have any factual basis. Michalska claimed that the film does not show the perspective of Border Guard officers, even though one of the principal actors (Tomasz Włosok) portrays such an officer (Jan), and then went on to decry the film as being a "deliberately created offensive film which does not tell the reality" and to state that "as officers [...] of the Border Guard, we firmly oppose all who slander the uniform". When asked if anyone from the Border Guard had seen the film, Michalska said that neither the film's plot nor its portrayal of the Border Guard were unknown; she then claimed to have personally seen the full film herself despite it having yet to be screened in Poland at the time of her statement and despite there being no evidence of a delegation from the Border Guard or the Polish state in general at the Venice Film Festival screening, and would repeatedly refuse to say how she had supposedly done so. When challenged about this on a later occasion, she insisted that she knew "every minute" of the film. In a later Polskie Radio 24 interview, Michalska again claimed that the film was pure fiction and that it showed nothing from a Border Guard perspective. She also said that the filmmakers did not consult the Border Guard with regards to the film; while this may be true for the Border Guard proper, Holland claimed during the Venice Film Festival that she did have input from individual Border Guard officers who contacted her anonymously.

=== Popular response in Poland ===
==== Box office ====
According to Kino Świat, Green Border was seen by over 137,000 people during its opening weekend; this would be a record result for Polish films that premiered in their home country during 2023. That result was later surpassed by The Peasants, making Green Border the second biggest opening weekend for a Polish film of 2023.

==== Review bombing ====
In the weeks leading up to the film's release, pro-government and nationalist individuals organised a review bombing campaign on Filmweb; out of 78 ratings on the site as of 6 September 2023, the average score was just 2.0 out of a possible 10. This was in stark contrast to the film's approval rating of what was then 88% on Rotten Tomatoes as well as a review by Filmweb's own critic, Jakub Popielecki, who gave 8 out of 10. Comments and forum posts on Filmweb's page for the film acted as an extension of the campaign, with one of the more popular posts calling for a boycott of what the post's author deemed to be "anti-Polish trash"; many posts also directed strongly worded criticism or indeed invective at Holland and at the film's cast. As with the comments by public officials, the campaign was based mostly on promotional materials rather than the film itself. As of 11 September, the film was rated by over 5,500 users and had an average score of 2.5 out of 10; at a later point, this fell to 2.3 out of 10 based on the ratings of over 8,000 users. Filmweb's deputy editor-in-chief Łukasz Muszyński said that the situation surrounding the ratings was "unprecdented" and that, while the site's users do occasionally leave ratings that are not based on a film's artistic merit, this phenomenon was being taken "to an extreme" with regards to Green Border. Muszyński said that Filmweb was monitoring the situation and that, in addition to general moderation of user comments, it had disabled comments on news about the film and on professional critics' reviews; in the latter case, he noted that the comments did not express an opinion so much as they consisted "purely of invective". Muszyński said that user ratings were an integral part of Filmweb and similar websites and so the ability to rate the film would be left in place, but the film's page was later modified to only display ratings based on professional critics' opinion of the film; these produced an initial average score of 7.6 out of 10, with a later score standing at 7.8 out of 10.

==== Protests and counter-protests ====
Some cinemas showing the film were subject to protests organised by those who supported the government or the political parties comprising it. There were also counter-protests organised by those who supported the film or were generally critical of how the Polish government was handling the border crisis.

=== Oscar submission ===
The film was tipped by some to be Poland's entry for the Academy Award for Best International Feature Film at the 96th Academy Awards, but the judging committee ultimately chose to nominate The Peasants (Polish: Chłopi) by four votes to Green Border's two. Following the nomination process, Holland claimed to have been told by several committee members that, while her film would have been the better choice to be nominated, they feared that doing so would lead to government reprisals in the form of restricted or withheld funding for future film projects; she did, however, add that she was unsure whether her production would have had the means to launch an independent Academy Awards campaign. Ewa Puszczyńska, the head of the judging committee, insisted that the committee was independent, that its members voted purely in accordance with their conscience, and that the result of the nomination process had been arrived at after deep discussion.

=== Awards and nominations ===
Green Border won or was nominated for the following awards:

Award	Date of ceremony	Category	Recipient(s)	Result	Ref.
Venice Film Festival	9 September 2023	Golden Lion	Agnieszka Holland	Nominated	
Venice Film Festival	9 September 2023	Special Jury Prize	Agnieszka Holland	Won	
Venice Film Festival	9 September 2023	ARCA CinemaGiovani Award - Best Film of Venezia 80	Agnieszka Holland	Won	
Venice Film Festival	9 September 2023	Premio CinemaSarà	Agnieszka Holland	Won	
Venice Film Festival	9 September 2023	Green Drop Award	Agnieszka Holland	Won	
Venice Film Festival	9 September 2023	Leoncino d'Oro Award - Cinema for UNICEF	Agnieszka Holland	Won	
Venice Film Festival	9 September 2023	Sorriso Diverso Venezia Award - Best Foreign Film	Agnieszka Holland	Won	
Venice Film Festival	9 September 2023	UNIMED Award - Prize for Cultural Diversity	Agnieszka Holland	Won	
Valladolid International Film Festival	28 October 2023	Golden Spike	Agnieszka Holland	Nominated	
Tertio Millenio Film Festival	13 November 2023	Special Fuoricampo Prize	Agnieszka Holland	Won	
European Film Awards	9 December 2023	Best Film	Green Border	Nominated	
European Film Awards	9 December 2023	Best European Director	Agnieszka Holland	Nominated	
European Film Awards	9 December 2023	Best European Screenwriter	Agnieszka Holland, Gabriela Łazarkiewicz-Sieczko, Maciej Pisuk	Nominated	
European Film Awards	9 December 2023	University Film Award	Green Border	Nominated	
IndieWire Critics Poll	11 December 2023	Best Films Opening in 2024	Green Border	5th Place	
International Film Festival Rotterdam	4 February 2024	Audience Award	Green Border	Won	
Polish Film Awards	4 March 2024	Best Film	Agnieszka Holland	Won	
International Film Festival and Forum on Human Rights	18 March 2024	Youth Jury Prize – Fiction Competition	Agnieszka Holland	Won	
Polish Film Festival	28 September 2024	Grand Prize – Golden Lions	Green Border	Won	
Polish Film Festival	28 September 2024	Audience Award	Green Border	Won	
Polish Film Festival	28 September 2024	Best Sound	Roman Dymny	Won	
Lumière Awards	20 January 2025	Best International Co-Production	Green Border	Nominated	
Magritte Awards	22 February 2025	Best Original Score	Frédéric Vercheval	Won	
