= Arash T. Riahi =

Austrian-Iranian director

- آرش ریاحی
- Born: August 22, 1972 (age 54); Iran
- Citizenship: Austria
- Education: Realgymnasium Schottenbastei; University of Vienna
- Occupations: Film director; Film Producer

Arash T. Riahi (born August 22, 1972) is an Austrian-Iranian director, producer and dramatic advisor. He is best known for his works Everyday Rebellion, For a Moment, Freedom and Exile Family Movie. Many of Riahi’s works as a director and producer draw on autobiographical themes, with recurring motifs of escape, freedom, and the pursuit of self-determination. He often works with his brother Arman T. Riahi as the Riahi Brothers.

Since November 2021, Riahi has served as president of the Austrian Film Academy together with Verena Altenberger.

== Early life and education ==
Riahi was born in Iran in 1972 to two teachers involved in secular leftist movements. In 1983, due to political persecution, his family fled Iran and resettled in Austria, where he grew up.

During his school years at Realgymnasium Schottenbastei in Vienna in 1983, Riahi developed an early interest in filmmaking through a media studies course. Together with his classmate Gèza Horvàt, he created several experimental short films. After early setbacks at student film festivals, the pair won the main prize at the Vienna Video & Film Days with The Boy and the Strange Reality.

He studied film and the arts at the University of Vienna from 1995 to 2000, while also working freelance in the youth and art department of the Austrian Broadcasting Corporation (ORF). In 1997, he founded the production company Golden Girls Films.

== Career ==
Riahi’s body of work includes short and experimental films, documentaries, and fiction features, many of which have screened in numerous international film festivals and received awards. In 2004, Riahi directed his debut feature documentary, The Souvenirs of Mr. X, which first screened at Diagonale and premiered in Karlovy Vary International Film Festival’s documentary completion, and also screened at the Tribeca Festival. The following year, he directed, shot and edited his short experimental film Mississippi which won prizes at numerous festivals including Dok Leipzig, Fantoche, Videoex, and Melbourne International Film Festival.

In 2006, Riahi directed the documentary feature film, Exile Family Movie, about an Iranian family dispersed by the Islamic Revolution who reunite in Mecca after more than 20 years apart. The film screened at Dok Leipzig, where it won Golden Doves and the FIPRESCI Prize, as well as Diagonale and Chicago International Film Festival.

Riahi’s directorial debut feature film For a Moment, Freedom, was a drama depicting the struggles of Iranian refugees in Turkey as they await asylum, based on three true stories. The film premiered at Montreal World Film Festival, where it won Gold Zenith, received Best Feature film at the Viennale, and was Austria’s official submission to the 82nd Academy Awards. In 2011, Riahi produced the documentary Mama Illegal, which had its world premiere at IDFA.

In 2012, Riahi directed Everything Will Not Be Fine (Nerven Bruch Zusammen), a documentary about women living in a Viennese transitional shelter. The film, based on Riahi’s earlier community service experience at the shelter in 1999–2000, follows several women facing displacement, trauma, and social exclusion, highlighting their everyday struggles and resilience.

Together with his brother, Arman T. Riahi, the Riahi brothers completed the cross-media documentary project Everyday Rebellion in 2013, which premiered at CPH:DOX and won Audience Awards. The brothers made the film to explore and document global movements of non-violent resistance, inspired by their family’s history of political persecution and contemporary protests such as Iran’s Green Movement, the Arab Spring, and Occupy. The film also won other awards including, the Cinema for Peace Award for Most Valuable Documentary of the Year, the CIVIS European Media Award for Online Media Prize, and Audience award at Biografilm Festival. In 2015, Riahi produced the first feature film of the Golden Girls production, One of Us. The film screened at several film festivals including San Sebastian International Film Festival, and received the Max Ophüls Prize at the Max Ophüls Festival as well as an award for Innovative Production Services at Diagonale.

In 2016, the Riahi brothers’ documentary Kinders portrayed children and teenagers from diverse backgrounds developing confidence through the music education program Superar. It received the Special Jury Award at the Sarajevo Film Festival and the Audience Award at the Diagonale. In the same year, Riahi co-produced fiction drama The Eremites and horror mystery Nighit of a 1000 Hours by Virgil Widrich. In the following year, he produced the comedy film The Migrumpies, which won the Audience award at Nashville Film Festival, and served executive producer and producer on the documentary Free Lunch Society - Come Come Basic Income.

In 2018, Riahi’s producing credits included drama Cops, and The Good Death as co-producer. In 2019, he produced the documentary Solo which premiere in the ACID section at Cannes Film Festival and co-produced Born in Evin with Tondowski Film, which won the Compass Perspektive Award at the Berlinale and later received the German Film Award.

Riahi’s second fiction feature Oskar & Lili – Where No One Knows Us had its world premiere at the 41st Max Ophüls Festival and received Audience Award for Best Feature Film. The film received five nominations at the Austrian Film Awards including Best Film and Best Director, and set a record by winning four Romy (TV award) for best director, best screenplay, best cinematography and best editing. In the same year, he co-produced Once Upon a Time in Venezuela which had its world premiere at Sundance and was the Venezuelan entry for the 93rd Academy Awards, and Fox in a Hole which had its world premiered at Warsaw Film Festival and won four awards at the Austrian Film Awards.

Among Riahi’s producing credits from 2021 to 2025 are Eismayer, which premiered at the 2022 Venice Critics’ Week and won the Grand Prize; The Witness (2024 film), which premiered in the Orizzonti Extra section at the 2024 Venice Film Festival, where it won Audience Award; Perla, which screened in Tiger Competition section at the 2025 International Film Festival Rotterdam; and How to Be Normal and the Oddness of the Other World, which premiered in the Berlinale Perspectives section at the 2025 Berlin International Film Festival. In 2025, he also co-directed documentary feature film Girls & Gods, which premiered at CPH:DOX and won the main award at the Biografilm Festival as well as the award for best score at the Diagonale.

=== Mentor and script advisor ===
In 2010, Riahi began working as a mentor and script advisor for various international programs, including SOURCES 2, Nipkow, Berlinale Script Station, the European Documentary Network, and the Jihlava Institute for Documentary Film. He teaches nonfictional storytelling and producing at the Vienna University, and gives lectures and masterclasses at institutions such as the Erich Pommer Institute, the Scottish Documentary Institute, the Goethe-Institut Dublin, ZKM Karlsruhe, Doc Incubator, EsoDoc, and CPH:DOX. Riahi is part of the script advisor team at European Audiovisual Entrepreneurs (EAVE).
