= Women's Protection Units =

Ethnic Kurdish military unit

- Kurdish: Yekîneyên Parastina Jin (YPJ); Arabic: وحدات حماية المرأة
- Flag of the YPJ
- Active: April 2013–August 2026
- Allegiance: Kurdish Supreme Committee (2013); Rojava (2013–2026); Democratic Union Party (2013–2026)
- Branch: Female service units
- Type: Light infantry (militia)
- Size: 24,000 (2017 estimate); 5,000 (2021 estimate); 8,000 (2025 Turkish Government claim)
- Part of: Syrian Democratic Forces (2015–2026)
- Mottos: "Know yourself, protect yourself"
- Engagements: Syrian civil war; Rojava conflict; Battle of Aleppo; Battle of Ras al-Ayn; Rojava–Islamist conflict; Siege of Kobanî; US intervention in the Syrian civil war; Eastern al-Hasakah offensive; Battle of Sarrin; Battle of Sarrin (March–April 2015); Battle of Sarrin (June–July 2015); Tell Abyad offensive; Battle of al-Hasakah; 2015 al-Hawl offensive; Tishrin Dam offensive; Eastern Syria insurgency; Al-Shaddadi offensive (2016); Operation Euphrates Shield; Operation Olive Branch; 2019 Turkish offensive into north-eastern Syria; Operation Dawn of Freedom; 2024 Syrian opposition offensives; Battle of Aleppo (2024); Deir ez-Zor offensive (2024); Turkish offensive into northeastern Syria (2024–2025); East Aleppo offensive (2024–2025); War in Iraq (2013–2017); December 2014 Sinjar offensive; November 2015 Sinjar offensive
- Website: https://ypjrojava.net/

Commanders
- General Commander: Nesrin Abdullah
- Kobanî commander: Meryem Kobanî
- Aleppo commander: Sewsen Bîrhat
- Leading commander for Raqqa operations: Rojda Felat

The Women's Protection Units (Note: Kurmanji Kurdish: Yekîneyên Parastina Jin, abbreviation YPJ, pronounced [jɛkiːnɛjeːn pɑːɾɑːstɯnɑː ʒɪn]; Arabic: وحدات حماية المرأة, romanized: Waḥdāt Ḥimāyat al-Marʼa; Classical Syriac: ܚܕܝ̈ܘܬܐ ܕܣܘܬܪܐ ܕܢܫ̈ܐ, romanized: Ḥḏāywāṯā ḏa-Suṯārā ḏa-Nešē) or Women's Defense Units (YPJ) was an all-female militia involved in the Syrian civil war. The YPJ was part of the Syrian Democratic Forces, the armed forces of the Democratic Autonomous Administration of North and East Syria, and was closely affiliated with the male-led YPG. While the YPJ was mainly made up of Kurds, it also includes women from other ethnic groups in Northern Syria. With the integration of the SDF and its affiliates into the Syrian state, the YPJ to join the forces under the Ministry of Interior.

== History ==
2016 VOA report about YPJ fighters

Women have been involved in Syrian Kurdish Resistance fighting since as early as 2011, when the mixed-sex YXG was founded, later to be renamed YPG in 2012. The YPJ was founded as a strictly women's organization on 4 April 2013 with the first battalion formed in Jindires and later expanded its activities towards the Kobane and Jazira cantons. All female fighters who were previously part of the YPG mixed units automatically became members of the YPJ. Initially, there was just one YPJ battalion in each of the three cantons of Rojava, but battalions were quickly established in every neighborhood, expanding the organization.

Between 2014 and November 2016 the YPJ counted between 7,000 and 20,000 members. As of August 2017, the group was reported to have 24,000 members. After the defeat of ISIL the number has decreased and according to an interview by its General Commander Newroz Ahmed given to The Guardian, is currently at 5,000.

In the Syrian civil war, the YPJ and the YPG have fought against various groups in northern Syria, including the Islamic State of Iraq and the Levant (ISIL) and were involved in the defense of Kobanî during the Siege of Kobanî beginning in March 2014, with various Kurdish media agencies reporting that "YPJ troops have become vital in the battle". In the Siege of Kobanî, prior to receiving the support of Western powers, the YPJ was forced to hold off ISIL attacks using only "vintage Russian Kalashnikovs bought on the black market, handmade grenades, and tanks they put together out of construction vehicles and pick-up trucks." It was not until October 2014 that the United States began coordinating air strikes with the YPJ-YPG fighters on the ground.

Additionally, the YPG, YPJ and the PKK were involved in an August 2014 military operation at Mount Sinjar, where up to as many as 10,000 Yazidis were rescued from genocide at the hands of ISIL. ISIL had taken control of most areas around Mount Sinjar after pushing out the Peshmerga. Because ISIL views the Yazidis as "a community of devil worshipers," those formerly inhabiting the town of Sinjar were forced to flee into the mountains. This left many Yazidis, including children and the elderly, without food, shelter, or resources. Those still in the town were either massacred by ISIL or forced into sexual slavery.

Along with the help of US air strikes, the attacking force was able to create a 30 kilometres (19 mi) safe zone for the Yazidi refugees to escape ISIL capture. The refugees were then moved into Northern Syria, with most later departing for safer areas of Iraqi Kurdistan.

YPJ continues to fight alongside YPG as part of the multi-ethnic Syrian Democratic Forces (SDF). The YPJ was involved in battles such as the SDF offensive against the major IS strongholds in Tabqa and Raqqa, serving as the main proxy force (along with the YPG) for the United States. During Operation Olive Branch, the Turkish offensive against Afrin Canton, YPJ units were again heavily involved in the fighting. Guerrilla warfare tactics were among the tactics used against Turkey and their Syrian rebel allies.

During the 2019 Turkish offensive into north-eastern Syria, Turkish-backed Free Syrian Army fighters trampled and mutilated the body of what appeared to be a YPJ fighter they killed in the countryside near Kobanî.

=== 2026 northeastern Syria offensive ===
In early 2026, the YPJ fought Syrian transitional government forces during the offensive in northeastern Syria, refusing to surrender its weapons and continuing to defend Kurdish-held areas. During the offensive YPJ fighters were subject to war-crimes committed by the Syrian Arab Army, one video-clip showed a room full of bodies, some showing signs of severe mutilation, of men and women in SDF uniforms, whilst another showed a YPJ fighters with her throat slit open whilst being mocked by Syrian Army members. Yet another shows a Syrian Army member driving over the bodies of SDF soldiers in an armored vehicle whilst recording a selfie. A widely circulated clip that sparked global backlash showed a soldier holding a braid of hair, claiming it was taken from the head of a Kurdish fighter, stating “This is the hair of a haval”. Syria’s Defense Ministry acknowledged “violations”.

=== Integration ===
When the SDF was dissolved in August 2026, many member units were sidelined and refused integration into the Syrian Army. The YPJ was among these units, as Syrian Defense Minister Murhaf Abu Qasra claimed that allowing women to serve in the army was "against Islam" despite the fact that Syria's Constitutional Declaration prohibits discrimination based on religion and gender and all neighboring Muslim states allowed women in their militaries. In response to the Syrian Defense Ministery's blocking efforts, a YPJ commander told researcher Amy Austin Holmes that "the same patriarchal mentality that existed under the Assad regime continues under al-Sharaa". The General Command of the YPJ subsequently organized meetings with the Ministry of Interior to integrate the YPJ into other sections of the Syrian security forces, as the Ministry of Interior demonstrated a more flexible position in regard to armed women. The meetings were described as fruitful by the YPJ leadership, and The New Arab reported that some YPJ members already began to work within the Interior Ministry. Conversely, the integration into the Interior Ministry would necessitate retraining, as the YPJ members would switch from serving as military soldiers to serving as police members. YPJ commander Nowruz Ahmed in response to the negotiations was quoted as saying, "We were aiming to join the army, because our forces have experience and expertise that would enable them to protect themselves in an organised way in the form of an independent brigade or battalion," "Our main condition was that this force must be organised, must not be deployed to any place, and must not be in small groups. They rejected this proposal". Some have claimed that YPJ members were offered roles in the interior ministries tourism police force which was rejected by the YPJ, although the YPJ claims that this offer was never made. The YPJ have reportedly proposed integration into the interior ministry's special operations forces.

== Ideology ==
The YPJ is politically aligned to the PYD, which bases its philosophy on the writings of Abdullah Öcalan, the leading ideologue in the Kurdistan Workers' Party (PKK), who is imprisoned by Turkey. Central to YPJ ideology is the PYD's ideological concept of "Jineology".

Dating back to the early 1990s, Öcalan had been advocating that a ‘basic responsibility’ of the Kurdish movement was to liberate women. He stated that gender equality and women's liberation is necessary for Kurdish liberation. The PKK established its first all-female units of guerrillas in 1995, stating that in order to "break down gender roles solidified by centuries, women had to be on their own." The YPJ adheres to the same strand of feminist ideology. Having joined the YPJ, women must spend at least a month practicing military tactics and studying the political theories of Öcalan, including Jineology. In any communal decision, regarding the YPJ/YPG or otherwise, it is required that no less than 40% of women participate.

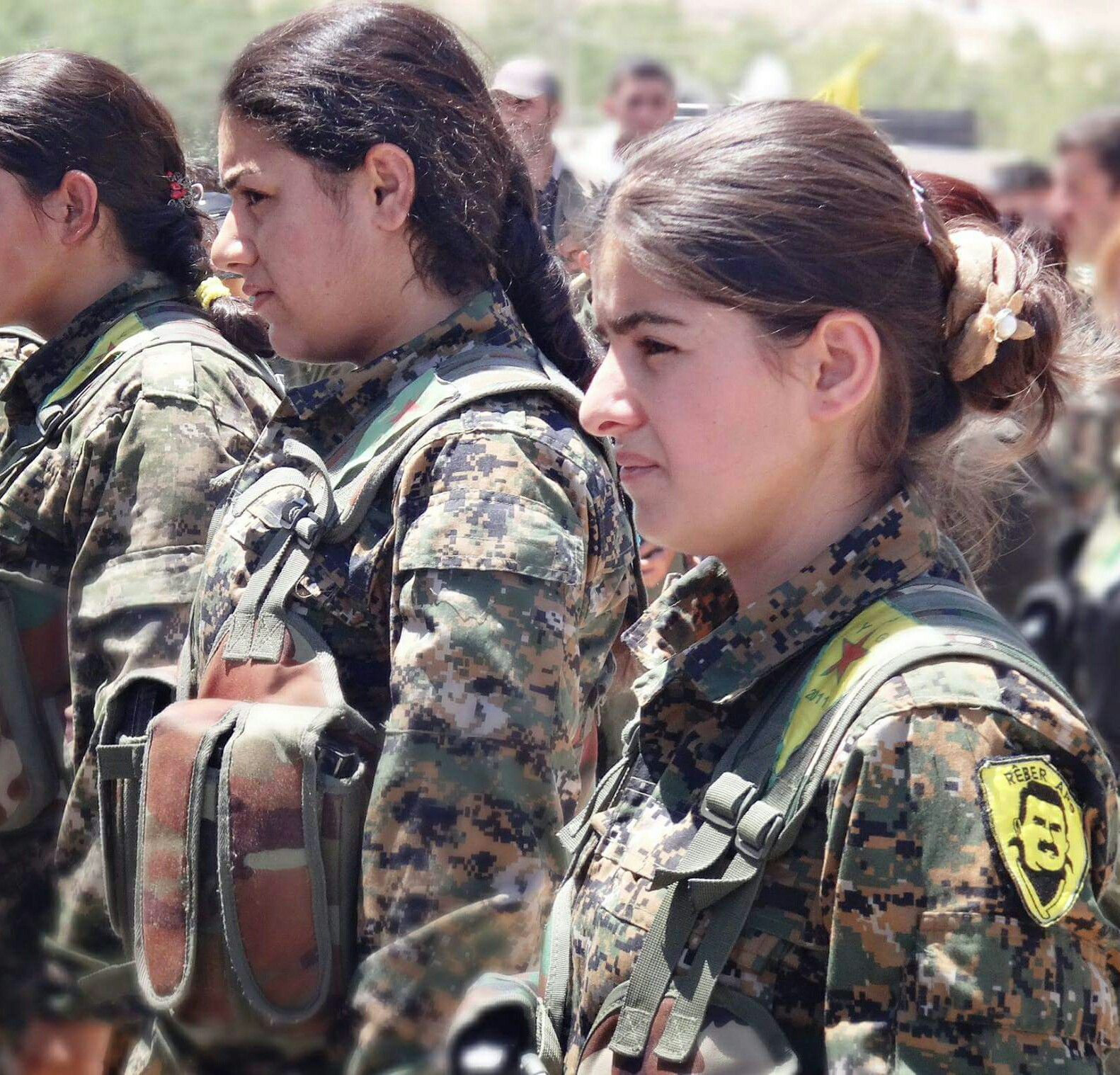
YPJ fighter wearing patch featuring Abdullah Öcalan

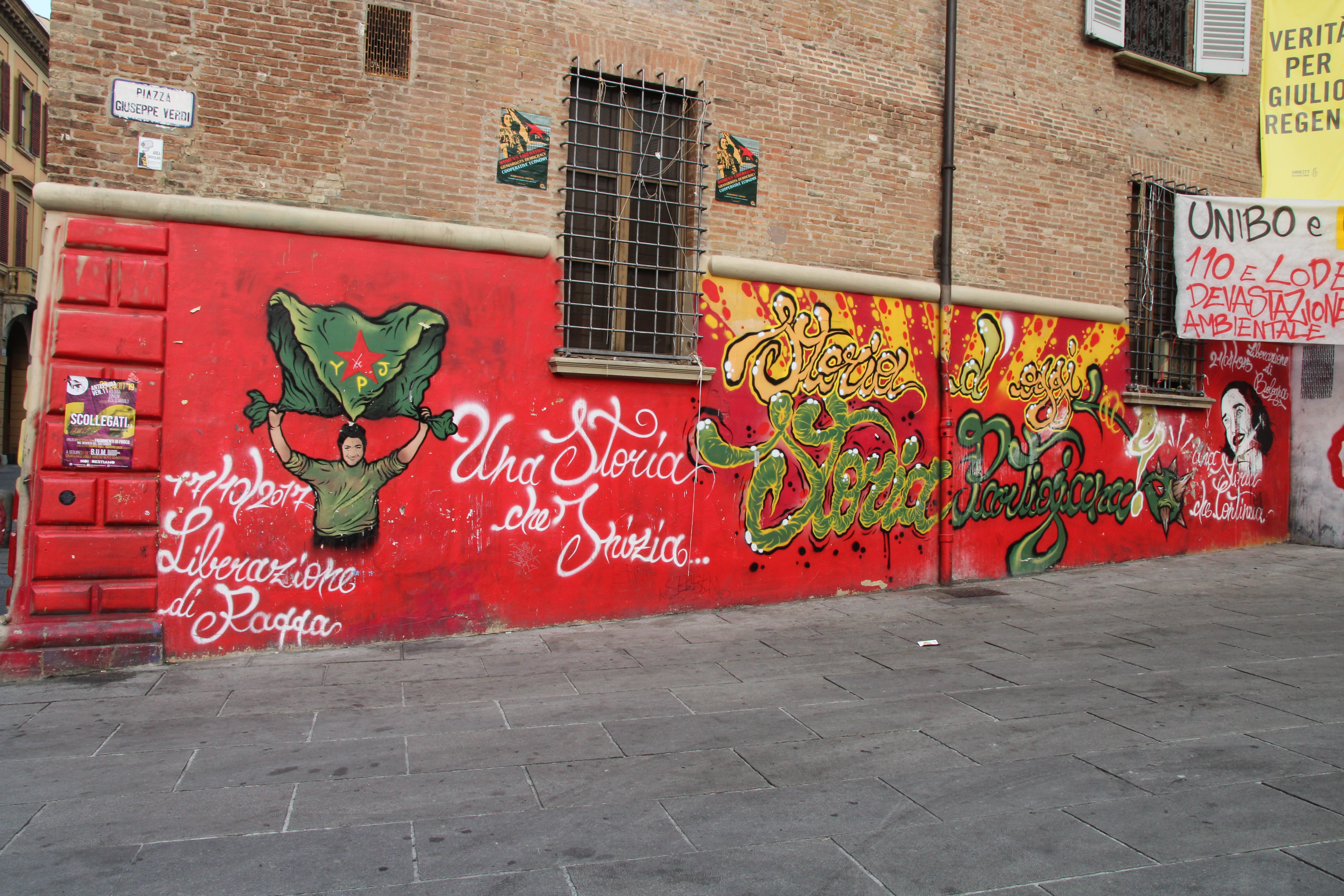
A mural in support of the YPJ in Bologna, Italy

The group has been praised by feminists for confronting traditional gender expectations and redefining the role of women in conflict in the region. YPJ militants often enter the militia over hardships endured in the family, like lost relatives caused by attacks or fighting. They play a role in changing the societal traditions by taking arms. These women say they are changing their community and society by doing so. The YPJ has attracted international attention as an example of significant achievement for women in a region in which women are systematically disadvantaged.

Another all-female force in northern Syria is the Bethnahrain Women's Protection Forces, which was formed as an Assyrian all-female brigade of the Syriac Military Council, seemingly inspired by the example of the YPJ. The Al-Bab Military Council, Kurdish Front and Liwa Thuwar al-Raqqa have also established their own female units.

Abdullah Öcalan's ideas surrounding women's rights have been integral to the founding of the YPJ. Öcalan argued that "the struggle for women's freedom must be waged through the establishment of their own political parties, attaining a popular women's movement, building their own nongovernmental organizations and structures of democratic politics." Öcalan developed this idea in 1996 when he published his theory of separation, which asserts that "if it is held that revolution cannot be made for the people, but rather by the people, then it must be held that revolution cannot merely be made for women but by women.” The YPJ makes women an integral part of the governmental structure of Rojava as well as giving women an independent military unit which aligns with the theory of separation. As such the YPJ is an example of the manifestation of Kurdish political ideology particularly regarding women's role in nation building.

== Recruitment ==
The YPJ (Women's Defense Units) recruits primarily single women for active combat roles. Married women with children are often assigned to non-combat roles in public relations, administration, and recruitment. Although the bulk of YPJ fighters are Kurdish women, Kurdish forces in Syria declared in 2017 that they will establish a battalion and training facility for Arab women to join the battle against the Islamic State group [IS]. YPJ is a volunteer army, and there is no compulsory recruitment. Some impoverished families receive financial compensation for their daughters' service. Women are allowed five days off per month to visit their families, but not all choose to do so, especially if their families discourage their return to the front lines. In contrast to men, who can go home every ten days, the rules for women's visits are more flexible, as YPJ makes its own decisions based on their unique perspectives and priorities. This reflects a distinct approach from Western feminism, as the women in YPJ have experienced a more direct and tangible form of oppression compared to many in the West, where oppression can be subtler, leading some to deny its existence.

Additionally, Arab and Yazidi women that the YPJ liberated from ISIS have also begun fighting against their former oppressors. The Yazidi population has since created its own self defense force, the Sinjar Resistance Units (YBŞ). According to YPJ and SDF commander Newroz Ehmed, the YPJ had between 5,000 and 6,000 fighters in summer 2022, of whom 60% were Kurds and the other 40% were mostly Arabs. The YPJ has set up institutions where these women are trained both militarily, as well as in fields such as feminist history and philosophy.

=== Foreign volunteers ===
Through the Syrian civil war hundreds traveled from Europe, Turkey and others to join the YPJ/YPG, some out of political affinity and others out of a desire to fight ISIS. On March 16, 2018, Anna Campbell became the first British woman to die while fighting as a part of the YPJ. Campbell had left her home in Lewes, East Sussex to go to Rojava and join the YPJ out of a desire to defend the revolution. She was killed by Turkish missile in the city of Afrin during Operation Olive Branch. Since her enlistment, a number of other British women, such as Rûken Renas, have also signed up to fight with the YPJ.

Hanna Bohman is another YPJ fighter hailing from the western hemisphere, in her case Canada. After nearly dying in a motorcycle incident, Bohman decided to leave her home in Vancouver, Canada to join the YPJ in February 2014.

== Supply ==
The YPJ relies on local communities for supplies and food. The YPJ (along with the YPG) received 27 bundles totaling 24 tons of small arms and ammunition as well as 10 tons of medical supplies from the United States and the Kurdistan Regional Government in Iraqi Kurdistan during the Siege of Kobanî.

== Child soldiers ==
In 2020, United Nations annual report on Children and Armed Conflict verified that the YPG/YPJ had 283 child soldiers followed by Tahrir al-Sham with 245 child soldiers, with the 2021 report going on to find that the Syrian National Army and related militias had 949 verified child soldiers. This comes despite a 2014 agreement made with the human rights group Geneva Call promising an end to recruitment of soldiers under the age of 18, whilst Geneva Call expressed 'relative satisfaction' with the process and offered training and support to SDF commanders, leading to a significant reduction in participation of minors on the frontline, the UN report differed, in part due to its use of the Optional Protocol on the Involvement of Children in Armed Conflict (OPAC), which holds non-state actors to a more stringent standard, as well as differences in methodology, such as what does and does not constitute a combat role and what organizations are counted as combat force. One reason for the continued prevalence of minors in combat roles within the SDF, according to Mehmet Balci of Geneva Call, was that 'the decentralized process of recruitment, which sometimes means regulations that have been agreed on at higher levels of command are ignored on the local level.'

== Recognition ==
- 2014, included in the Women of the year by CNN

== In popular culture ==
- The 2018 French war drama Girls of the Sun, directed by Eva Husson, is a fictional depiction of the YPJ and their exploits during the Syrian Civil War inspired on true events.
- The 2022 Kurdish film Kobanê depicts the role of women fighters of the YPJ in the Siege of Kobanî.
- The women fighters of the YPJ are depicted in season six of SEAL Team.
- The 2023 Documentary Dream's Gate, directed by Negin Ahmadi depicts the role of women fighters of the YPJ during Civil war. She ventured into the war-torn region with her video camera in 2016.

== See also ==
- Kurdish women
- Kurdistan
- Rojava conflict
- Women in warfare and the military (2000–present)
- Kimmie Taylor
- Foreign fighters in the Syrian civil war

== Bibliography ==
- Rashid, Bedir Mulla (2018) [1st pub. 2017]. Military and Security Structures of the Autonomous Administration in Syria. Translated by Obaida Hitto. Istanbul: Omran for Strategic Studies. Archived from the original on 1 July 2018.
