= Inna Shevchenko =

Ukrainian activist

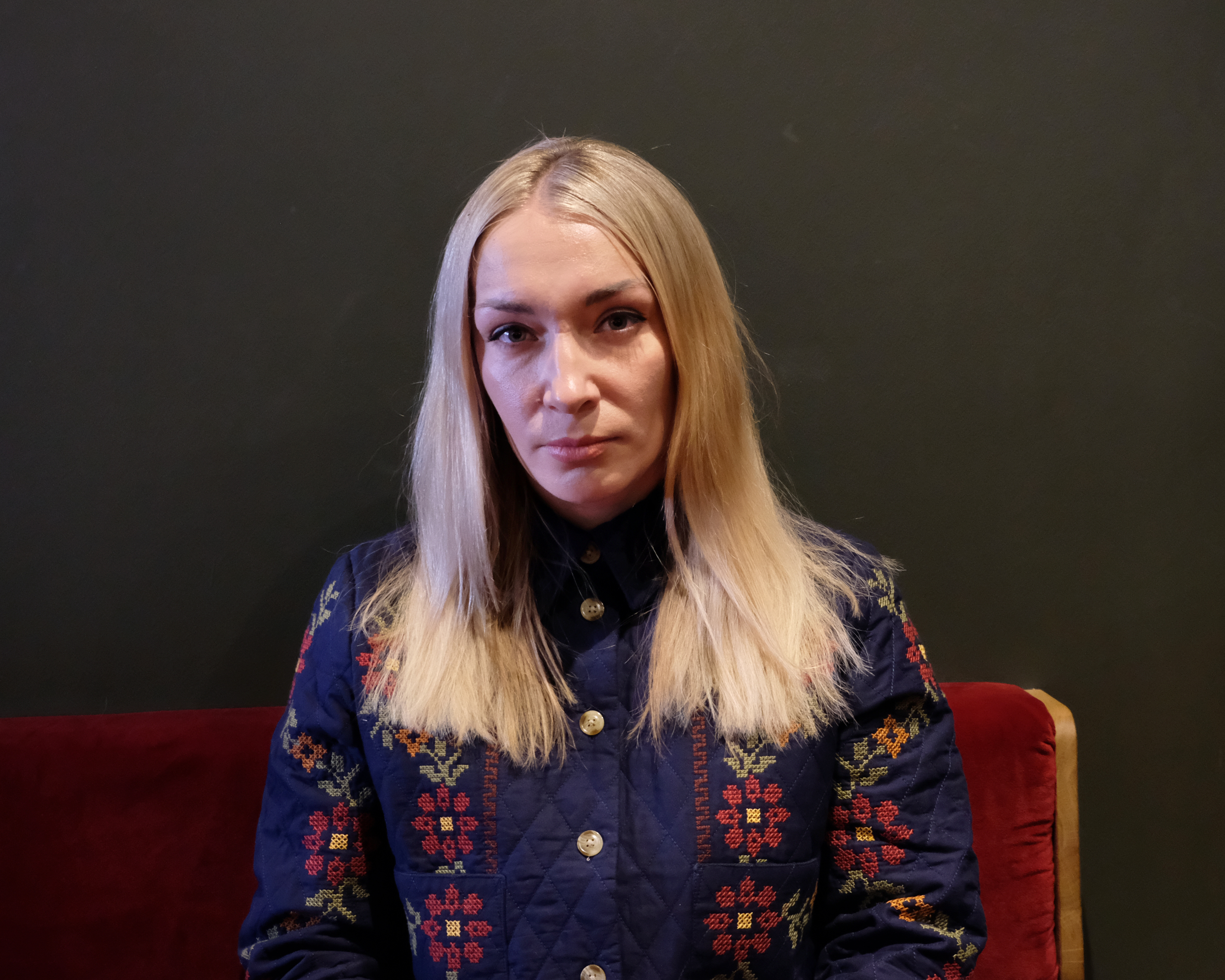
- Shevchenko in 2025
- Born: 23 June 1990 (age 36); Kherson, Ukrainian SSR, Soviet Union
- Education: Taras Shevchenko National University of Kyiv
- Occupation: Activist
- Movement: FEMEN

Inna Shevchenko (Ukrainian: Інна Шевченко) is a Ukrainian feminist activist and the leader of international women's movement FEMEN, which often demonstrates topless against what they perceive as manifestations of patriarchy, especially dictatorship, religion, and the sex industry. Shevchenko has a higher profile than the other members of the group. She was the leader of the three FEMEN activists reputedly kidnapped and threatened by the Belarus KGB in 2011. She achieved attention in Ukraine by cutting down a 4-metre high Christian cross with a chainsaw in central Kyiv in 2012.

In 2013, Shevchenko was granted asylum in France, and now continues her activism by leading FEMEN France from a training base she has established in Paris.

In July 2013, Olivier Ciappa, who together with David Kawena designed a new French stamp depicting Marianne, stated on Twitter that Shevchenko had been the main inspiration for the depiction.

In 2025, she authored A Letter From The East (Une Lettre de l'Est), a novel that draws from the testimonies of dozens of Ukrainian women returned from Russian captivity exploring the horrors of the war in Ukraine. The novel was awarded the 2025 Prix des Femmes de Lettres.

== Early life ==
Inna Shevchenko was born in Kherson near the Black Sea, on 23 June 1990. Inna had a childhood 'like that of all girls. I was brought up as a typical Ukrainian, Slavic girl, and was taught not to shout or argue'. She was a 'patsanka' (tomboy) and was especially close to her father who was a military officer. She also has an older sister. The 2004 Orange Revolution opened her eyes to politics and in the TV shows which pitted journalists against politicians, she said the journalists 'looked more intelligent so I wanted to be one'. She went to university at the Taras Shevchenko National University of Kyiv from 2008 until 2012 where she studied journalism and graduated with honours. Her extracurricular activity as a leader of the student government gave her political connections that helped land her a job in 2009 working for the Mayor's press office in Kyiv. Shevchenko's first language is Russian, (Note: Ukrainian is the dominant language in Western Ukraine and to a lesser extend in Central Ukraine; while Russian is the dominant language in Eastern Ukraine and Southern Ukraine (Source: Serhy Yekelchyk Ukraine: Birth of a Modern Nation, Oxford University Press (2007), ISBN 978-0-19-530546-3).) although she is also fluent in Ukrainian, English and French.

== Activism & FEMEN ==
=== Early years in Ukraine ===
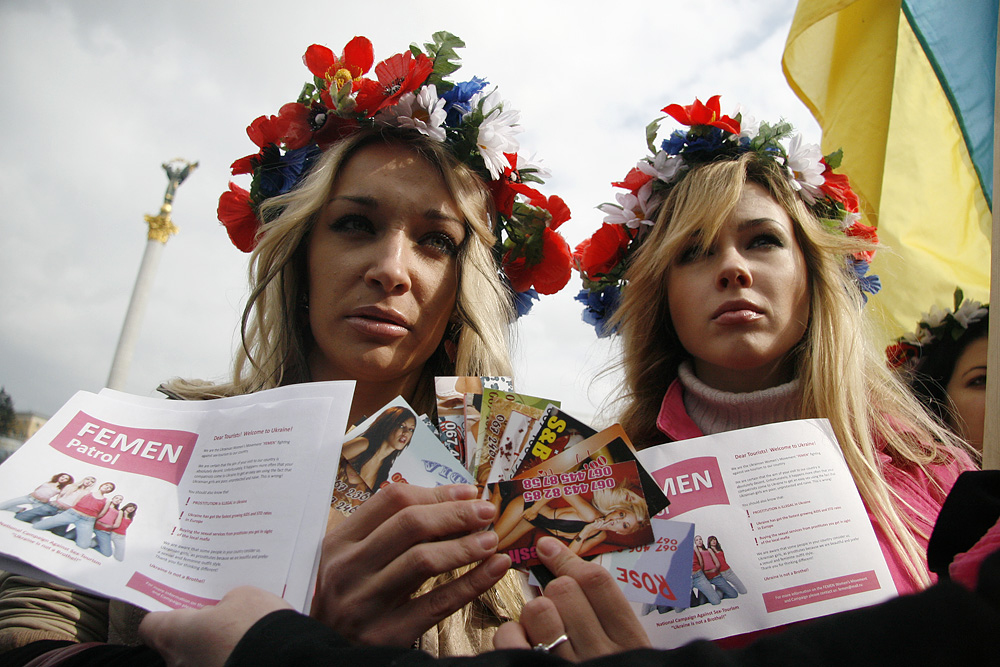
Shevchenko (left) and Alexandra Shevchenko prepare for the 2010 Kyiv campaign

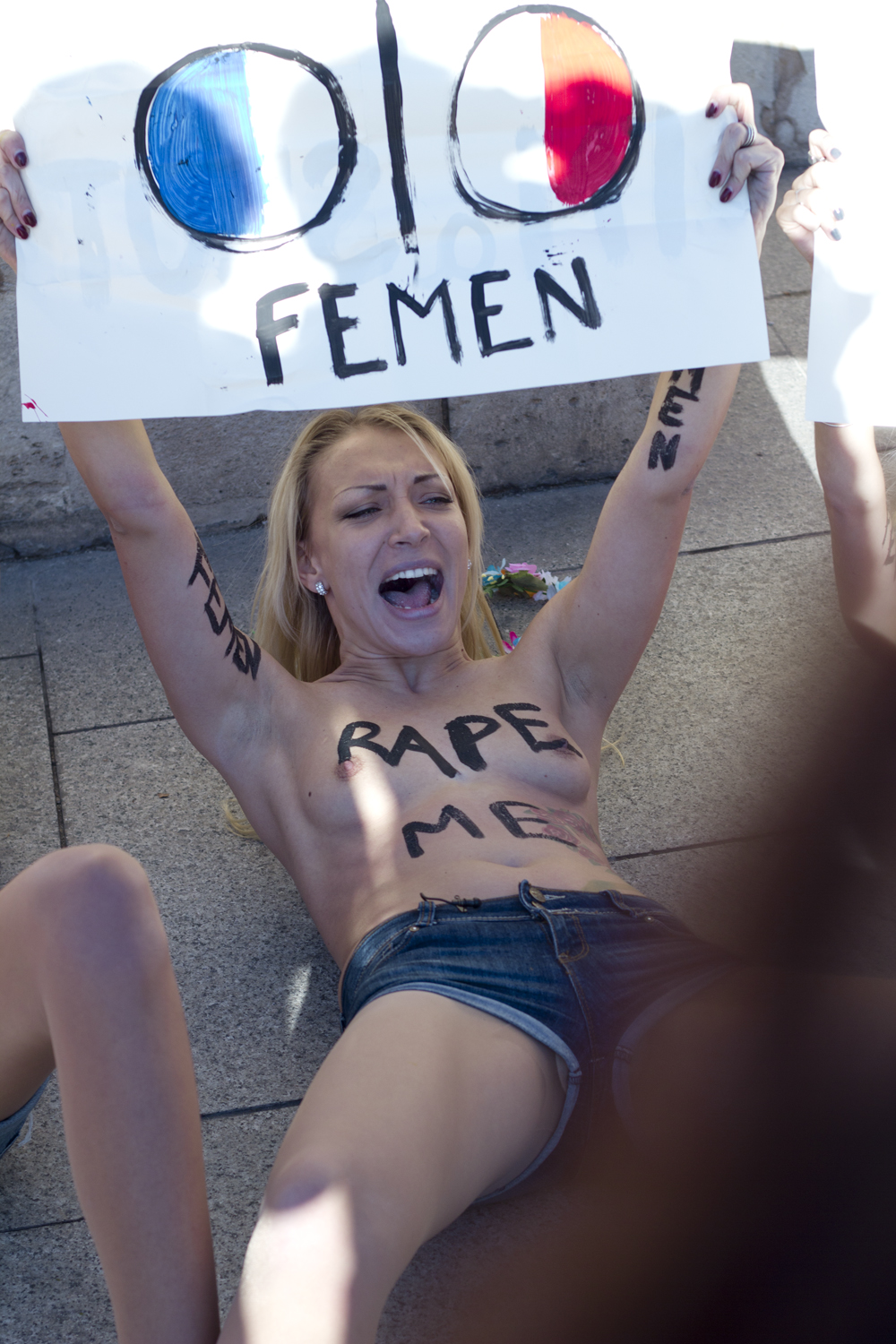
Inna Shevchenko on 15 October 2012 during a protest in Kyiv

Shevchenko made contact with two leading FEMEN activists Anna Hutsol and Alexandra Shevchenko (no relation) through the social networking site vKontakte and joined FEMEN early in 2009. Anna Hutsol had formed FEMEN in Kyiv on 10 April 2008, with two friends, Alexandra Shevchenko and Oksana Shachko, from her hometown of Khmelnytskyi; they initially protested on issues affecting woman students, but rapidly moved to demonstrating against the sexual exploitation of Ukrainian women. Inna Shevchenko first demonstrated with FEMEN on 23 May 2009 in Kyiv, against prostitution and under the banner, "Ukraine is not a Brothel", in collaboration with DJ Hell. Late in August 2009, Oksana Shachko became the first member of the group to bare her breasts during a protest; but not until 2010 did this become the usual tactic in FEMEN demonstrations, justified on the grounds that without the media attention generated by topless protests their message would not be heard. In debates within FEMEN over the ethics of topless protest, Inna Shevchenko at first opposed the tactic, then was persuaded of its validity. She was fired from her job in the Kyiv Mayor's press office after her arrest for taking part in a protest against the absence of women in Prime Minister Mykola Azarov's cabinet in December 2010.

=== Asylum in France ===
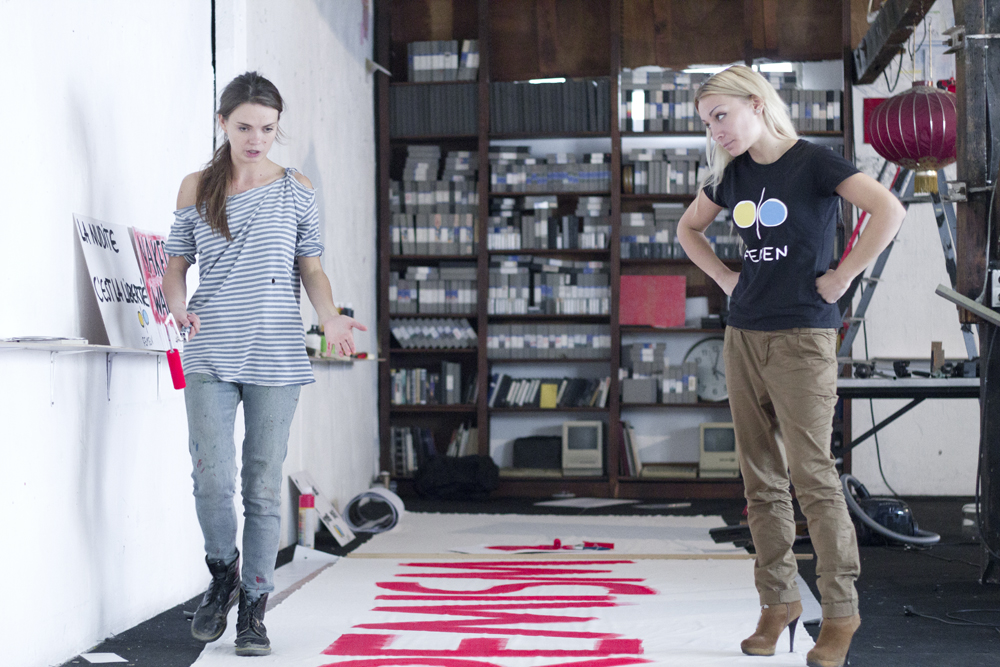
Inna Shevchenko and Oksana Shachko in Paris (2012)

On 8 September 2012, Shevchenko cut down wooden crosses at GOGBOT festival in Enschede, the Netherlands, as a protest on the arrest of Pussy Riot., following her cross-chainsawing action in Kyiv in August. 18 September 2012, Shevchenko established a training facility for FEMEN France in Paris. 26 October 2012, when Shevchenko was giving a live interview to the Arab television channel Al Jazeera, she was asked, "Which is better for women, nudity or the paranja?" She responded by taking off her T-shirt in protest at "Medieval prejudices". The live picture was immediately cut. In July 2013, Shevchenko was granted asylum in France.

In December 2012, the French magazine Madame Figaro included Shevchenko in its list of the world's top 20 iconic women of the year.

In July 2013, Olivier Ciappa, who together with David Kawena designed a new French stamp depicting Marianne, stated on Twitter that Shevchenko had been the main inspiration for the depiction. The artist Olivier Ciappa who designed the 2013 image of Marianne on French stamps has stated that the portrait is a 'mixture of several women but particularly Inna Shevchenko'. On hearing this Inna tweeted 'All homophobes, extremists, fascists will have to lick my arse when they want to send a letter'.

=== Public speaking ===
Shevchenko speaking at the 2017 International Conference on Free Expression and Conscience

Shevchenko is a speaker at conferences and a columnist for the international press. She was a speaker at a debate on the freedom of speech in Copenhagen on 14 February 2015 with cartoonist Lars Vilks. She was speaking about an illusion that in Western Europe people can fully enjoy freedom of speech when a terrorist opened fire in the lobby of the cultural centre, where the debates took place.

Shevchenko's TEDxKalamata talk is entitled "I will not stop speaking out loud".

=== Writing ===
She is a columnist for International Business Times Her articles were also published in The Guardian, The Huffington Post, and CNN. Together with other FEMEN activists, Shevchenko wrote FEMEN: Manifeste and Rebellion In 2017 Inna Shevchenko has published Anatomie de l'oppression (Anatomy of oppression) with Pauline Hillier in Edition du Seuil. In 2025 she authored A Letter from the East, a novel that draws from the lived experiences of Ukrainian women during Russian occupation. The novel was awarded the 2025 Prix des Femmes de Lettres.

== Bibliography ==
- Tyler, Jeffrey, Topless Jihadis, Published by The Atlantic Books ( 2013), 94 pages. (English language publication)
- Ackerman, Galia, with Anna Hutsol, Oksana Shachko, Alexandra Shevchenko, & Inna Shevchenko, FEMEN, Published by Calmann-Lévy (Paris 2013), 280 pages. ISBN 978-2702144589. (French language publication)
- Caroline Fourest "INNA", Published by Grasset (Paris 2014)
- Massimo Ceresa, "FEMEN, Inna e le streghe senza Dio", Tra le righe libri (Lucca 2016)
- FEMEN Inna Shevchenko, Marguerite Stern, Pauline Hillier, Sarah Constantin, Lara Alcazar, Anna Hutsol and others FEMEN Manifest, Published by Utopia( 2015), (French/Spanish language publication)
- FEMEN Rebellion, Published by Edition des femmes( 2017),(French language publication)
- Inna Shevchenko, Pauline Hillier Anatomie de l'oppression, Published by Edition du Seuil( 2017),(French language publication)
- Catherine Valenti, Les Femmes qui s'engagent sont dangereuses, ( 2017), (French language publication)

== Filmography ==
- "Nos seins, nos armes!" (Our breasts, our weapons!), documentary film (1 hour 10 mins), written and directed by Caroline Fourest and Nadia El Fani, produced by Nilaya Productions, aired on France 2 on 5 March 2013.
- "Everyday Rebellion", documentary film (1hour 58 mins), written and directed by the Riahi Brothers Arash T. Riahi and Arman Riahi, Austria / Switzerland / Germany, 2013, world premiere at Copenhagen International Documentary Festival on 13 November 2013.
- Ukraine Is Not a Brothel a 2013 Australian documentary movie by Kitty Green about FEMEN. The picture debuted at the 70th Venice International Film Festival.
- "Girls & Gods", documentary film (1hour 44 mins), written by Shevchenko and directed by Arash T. Riahi and Verena Soltiz, Austria, 2025, world premiere at Copenhagen International Documentary Film Festival

== See also ==
- Nudity and protest
- History of feminism
- Women in Ukraine
