= Girls & Gods =

2025 Austrian documentary film

- Girls & Gods Poster
- Directed by: Arash T. Riahi; Verena Soltiz
- Screenplay by: Inna Shevchenko
- Produced by: Arash T. Riahi; Peter Drössler; Sabine Gruber; Rhea Plangg; Amel Soudani; Michael Katz; Veit Heiduschka
- Cinematography: Simone Hart; Anna Hawliczek
- Edited by: Lisa Zoe Geretschläger; Elisabeth Pucar
- Music by: Alicia Mendy; Baby Volcano; ANOHNI
- Production companies: Golden Girls Film; Amka Films Productions; Wega Film
- Release date: 23 March 2025 (CPH:DOX)
- Running time: 1hr 43 mins
- Country: Austria
- Languages: English, Ukrainian

Girls & Gods is a 2025 Austrian documentary film directed by Arash T. Riahi and Verena Soltiz, initiated and written by Ukrainian FEMEN activist Inna Shevchenko. The film follows Shevchenko as she travels to meet women from diverse backgrounds to discuss women’s rights and religion.

It features notable figures like Nadya Tolokonnikova of Pussy Riot and French cartoonist Coco, whose satirical feminist drawings recur throughout the film. It balances serious debate with cinematic storytelling, observational humor, and a visual rather than academic approach.

== Synopsis ==
This film asks the question, can feminism and religion coexist? Girls and Gods is a journey led by Inna Shevchenko - the project's author and initiator - to answer this question. Shevchenko is known for leading FEMEN's topless protests against patriarchal power structures. In dialogue she talks with priests, imams, rabbis, theologians, and fellow activists. Inquiry is conducted into women's rights and religious tradition, asking if age-old faiths include gender equality and feminism.

== Production ==
Girls & Gods was produced by Golden Girls Film, in co-production with Amka Films and Wega Film. Director Arash T. Riahi first worked with Ukrainian activist Inna Shevchenko on their 2013 documentary Everyday Rebellion. Years later, Shevchenko proposed a film exploring women who identify as both feminists and members of religious communities, aiming to examine reform from within. Verena Soltiz joined as a co-director in 2018, and the directors sought contributors from Christianity, Judaism, and Islam.

Filming faced challenges such as securing access to religious spaces, delays from the COVID-19 pandemic, and funding difficulties due to the subject’s perceived controversy. According to Riahi, some potential participants declined involvement due to fear of criticism from their communities, despite sharing the film’s aims. He noted that additional material was filmed but not included in the final cut and expressed interest in developing a longer-format series based on the project.

From Soltiz’s perspective, her role centered on shaping the film’s visual and artistic dimension. Soltiz sought artworks—ranging from sculpture and graffiti to music and photography—at each filming location, and selected pieces that reflected both opposition to and support for religious institutions. In editing, she emphasized Shevchenko’s personal development over the course of the project, including the influence of motherhood on her worldview.

== Release ==
Girls & Gods had its world premiered on March 23, 2025 at CPH:DOX in Denmark, where it was nominated for the Human Rights Award. Prior to its premiere, it was selected for the Europe! On Demand online showcase, an initiative by European Film Promotion and the festival to boost the visibility of European documentaries in the North American market.

It had its Austrian premiere on March 28, 2025 at the Diagonale – Festival des österreichischen Films, where it won the award for Best Score. The German premiere took place on May 9, 2025 at DOK.fest München, followed by an Italian screening in June 2025 at the Biografilm Festival, where it won the Best Film Unipol Award in the International Competition.

== Reception ==
Girls & Gods won the Best Film Award in the International Competition at Biografilm, with the jury praising its "poetic and powerful portrayal of female resistance," highlighting Inna Shevchenko’s fearless presence and the sensitive direction of Arash T. Riahi and Verena Soltiz. They described it as an urgent, human, and profoundly moving work, rooted in the spirit of "Woman, Life, Freedom."

=== Critical reviews ===
Ricardo Gallegos of La Estatuilla describes Girls & Gods as "a triumphant, enriching and enlightening cinematic debate" where "Shevchenko is an electric presence" engaging women of various faiths on feminism and religion. He praises the film’s dynamic editing, integration of feminist art, and its understanding of "the need for radicalism and collectivism to generate change."

Joseph Tomastik of Loud and Clear calls Girls & Gods a documentary that "effectively, bluntly, and fairly engages in discussions with women to ask a very complicated question: can feminism and religion coexist?" According to him, "if you’re willing to hear out anyone you respectfully disagree with regarding how to attain those freedoms, you’ll very likely find something valuable to think about in this movie." His main criticism is that it can feel "too inside baseball" for viewers without prior knowledge of religion’s historical controversies.
