= Hanna Bohman =

Canadian former model

Hanna Bohman is a Canadian former model who decided to travel to Syria to become a fighter with the Kurdish Women's Protection Units (YPJ).

She decided to join the Kurdish forces in Syria after watching a propaganda video of the Islamic State of Iraq and the Levant (ISIS) featuring Canadian John Maguire. He had gone to fight for the militant group and appeared in propaganda videos to incite Canadians to launch attacks in their own country. Bohman told Vice that she also wanted to do something useful with her life after surviving a near fatal motorcycle accident. She told them that "I had wasted so much of my life trying to make a living, that I hadn't actually started to live. Fighting the Satanic State and being part of the revolution in Rojava is a dream come true. Not that I dreamed of killing people, but that I am now truly useful."

A former model with A.B.C., she told the channel CTV Vancouver that "I needed to do something with my life. I was bored. I didn't feel like I had done anything that I felt was really important". She was smuggled into the country and decided to join the YPJ because she felt they were fighting for women's rights in the region.

Bohman's nom de guerre is Tiger Sun. She worked for a defensive unit of the YPJ in 2015 before returning to Canada after suffering from malnutrition. But she soon decided to return to Rojava.

Bohman took part in the battle of Tel Abyad, Tel Tamir and Suluk in 2015.

In an interview of June 2017, she told the BBC that her intention was to help fight for women's rights in the Middle East. In 2017, a documentary called Fear Us Women was released telling the story of her experiences with the YPJ.
