= Walchensee Forever =

2017 film

- Film poster
- Directed by: Janna Ji Wonders
- Release date: 24 February 2020 (BIFF)
- Running time: 110 minutes
- Country: Germany
- Language: German

Walchensee Forever is a 2020 German documentary film directed by Janna Ji Wonders. Wonders chronicles the life of four generations of women from her family.

== Reception and awards ==
The film won the Grand Prix at the 2020 Biografilm Festival in Bologna.
