= Kobanê (film) =

- Directed by: Özlem Yasar
- Written by: Özlem Arzêba; Medya Doz
- Produced by: Diyar Hesso
- Starring: Asif Ahmed; Siyar Sêx Nebî; Madlên Sêx Xidir; Awar Elî
- Cinematography: Cemil Kızıldağ
- Edited by: Emilie Orsini
- Music by: Mehmûd Berazî
- Production company: Rojava Film Commune
- Release date: 20 September 2022 (Kobanî)
- Running time: 158 minutes
- Country: Syria
- Language: Kurdish

Kobanê is a 2022 Kurdish war film about the Siege of Kobanî fought from October 2014 to January 2015 between the Kurdish People's Defense Units (YPG) and the Women's Protection Units (YPJ) against the Islamic State. The film is directed by Özlem Yasar and produced by the Rojava Film Commune. It was shot in Tabqa in Syria. The film focuses on the role of Kurdish women in the fighting.

The film premiered in the city of Kobanê at the Cultural Centre on 20 September 2022.

== Synopsis ==
At the peak of its strength, with control over half of Syria and Iraq, the Islamic State continues its push toward the Kurdish Syrian city of Kobanê on the border of Turkey and Syria.

After being notified of an incoming attack by scout Renchber, Women's Protection Units (YPJ) leader Zehra mounts a desperate defense in the Kobanê countryside. Despite the efforts of marksman Moussa and his sniper group, enemy armor overwhelms the position and a fighter sacrifices his life to destroy a tank.

In a Suruç hospital, Derya, a nurse, tends to a People's Defense Units (YPG) fighter who tells her that he was treated by a doctor with a tattoo. Nearby, various groups of Kurdish fighters cross the Turkish border to reinforce Kobanê. An ISIS commander orders his troops to commit massacres of civilians as they advance.

The defenders retreat back to their base in Kobanê, where Zehra meets with fellow commanders Abu Layla and Masiro. As Kurdish reinforcements finally reach the city, Zehra reunites with old friends, including experienced guerilla leader Gelhat and fellow YPJ fighters Asmin and Arin. Abu Layla also finds his Kurdish Front comrades, who have arrived from Aleppo.

Zehra and Arin attempt to hold on to the crucial Meshteneur Hill, but Rojwar, their senior commander, flees. Arin detonates herself in front of a tank to buy time for Kurdish forces to retreat to the city. Zehra and her group are almost overrun, but a counterattack by Abu Layla, Gelhat, and a citizen militia manages to turn the tide. Derya arrives during the battle, and joins the YPJ to continue her search for the doctor.

On Eid, a member of Abu Layla's Aleppo group tells him that the Turks want him to betray the YPG alliance in exchange for ISIS releasing his brother. Other problems occur, as many of the new arrivals have little experience and one can not even speak Kurdish. Casualties rise due to an enemy sniper and constant VBIED attacks. An ISIS squad slips through the defenses, cutting off a group of new recruits. Asmin is surrounded fighting to save them and commits suicide to avoid capture before a rescue team led by Zehra and Gelhat arrives.

Zehra assigns Derya to Moussa's group to track down and kill the enemy sniper. Masiro leads a mission outside the city to carry out guerilla attacks against the enemy's flank. Meanwhile, the Kurdish forces in Kobanê take several casualties in a major offensive that captures an ISIS stronghold. While visiting a memorial for a comrade killed in that offensive, Derya finds that the man she has been looking for also died in defense of the city.

After receiving a green light from Masiro, Zehra and Gelhat prepare their forces to encircle the remaining ISIS troops. However, confusion arises when they lose contact with Abu Layla, who is meeting with Turkish soldiers at the border. Abu Leyla then arrives with much-needed weapons and ammo, and it is revealed that he and Gelhat planned to double-cross the Turks all along. With these, Abu Layla's group is able to hold against a flanking attack as the rest of the Kurdish fighters continue the encirclement. The enemy sniper shoots Renchber and Gelhat, but Moussa and Derya locate and kill him. Zehra takes charge of the attack, chasing down and killing the ISIS commander in an alleyway. As jets fly overhead, she watches Derya topple the ISIS flag while walking through the city center with her comrades.

The film ends with footage of the actual battle and the real life fighters portrayed in the movie, many of whom sacrificed their lives to stop ISIS.

== See also ==
- Girls of the Sun (film)
