= Nesrin Abdullah =

Kurdish commander

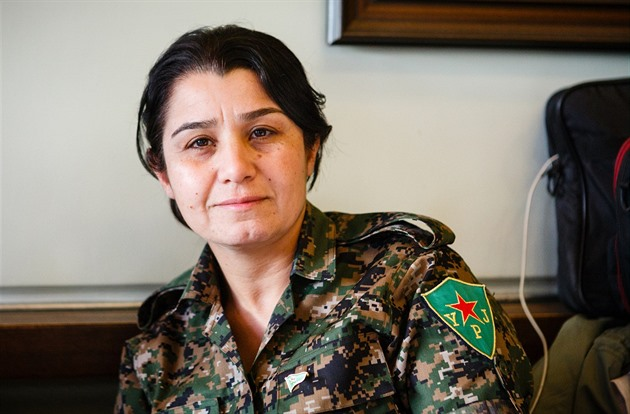
- Nesrin Abdullah, spokesperson for YPJ
- Born: 1980 (age 45–46); Al-Malikiyah, Syria
- Military career
- Allegiance: SDF
- Branch: YPG
- Service years: 2011–present
- Rank: Commander
- Unit: YPJ
- Known for: Leading spokesperson for the Women's Protection Units (YPJ)
- Conflicts: Syrian Civil War; Siege of Kobanî; 2017 Southern Raqqa offensive; Battle of Afrin

Nesrin Abdullah is a commander and spokesperson for the militia group YPJ (Women's Protection Unit) in Syria. She has been active in communicating the progress of the Kurdish and Syrian Democratic Forces operation to liberate Raqqa from ISIS. She was born in Al-Malikiyah of Al-Hasakah Governorate.

She has been involved in the women's defense organization as early in 2011 and in April 2013 she announced the establishment of the YPJ. In 2015, she was part of a delegation of the YPG/J who met with French President Francois Hollande in Paris. She has also stated that she believes that Turkey was involved in the massacre of civilians in Kobanê in 2014 by ISIS. She made the statement while part of a Kurdish delegation that included Kurdish Democratic Union (PYD) Co-president Salih Müslim and Kobanê Canton Administration Co-president Enver Müslim to Italy on 23 July 2015.

While in Italy in June 2015 she told the Italian newspaper Il Manifesto that, "we are militants; we are not paid to make war, we are partisans of revolution. We live with our people, follow a philosophy and have a political project. [...] At the same time we are carrying out a gender struggle against the patriarchal system. Other combatants are our comrades; we have political and friendly relations".

== See also ==
- Jineology
- Rojava
- Women's Protection Units
