= Kimmie Taylor =

English Kurdish militia member

Kimberley Taylor
- Born: January 1, 1989; Darwen, Lancashire, England
- Other name: Zilan Dilmar
- Education: University of Liverpool
- Military career
- Allegiance: SDF
- Service years: 2015–present
- Rank: Fighter
- Unit: YPJ
- Known for: First British woman to join a female militia in Syria, Combat media team member, Battle of Raqqa
- Conflicts: Syrian Civil War; Battle of Raqqa (2017); Siege of Kobanî; 2017 Southern Raqqa offensive; Battle of Afrin
- Other work: Journalist, Activist
- Website: twitter.com/kimmieslife

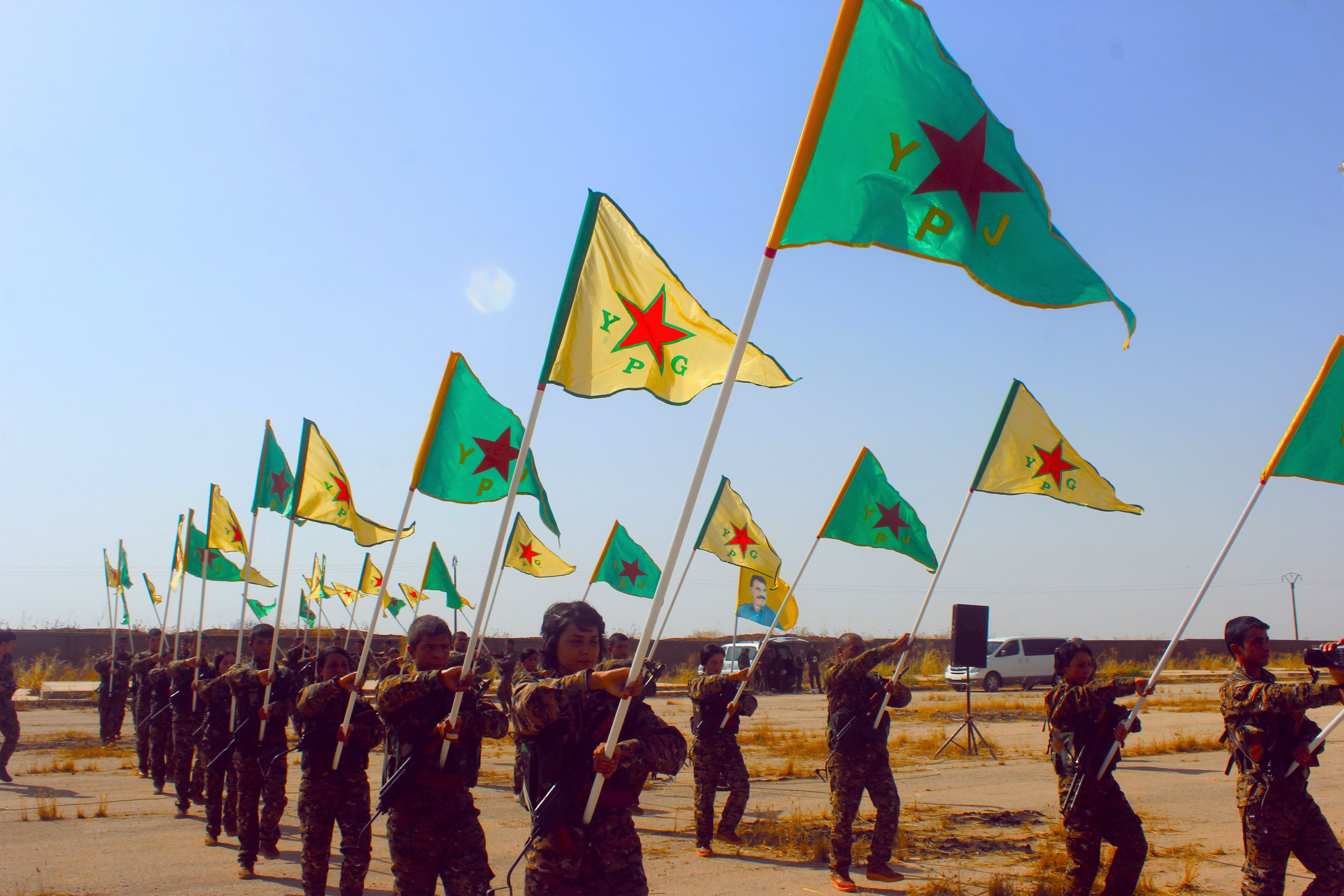
YPJ and YPG fighters

Kimberley Taylor (born 1989), also known as Zilan Dilmar, is an English fighter with the Kurdish Women's Protection Units (YPJ) and the first British woman to join a female militia in Syria. She is a member of the YPJ's combat media team and was present at the Battle of Raqqa in 2017.

== Early life ==
Kimberley Taylor was born in 1989. Her father Phil is a former teacher. She was raised in Darwen, near Blackburn, Lancashire. The family moved to the Merseyside area when she was a teenager. She studied mathematics at the University of Liverpool. In her early 20s, Taylor travelled alone in Africa, South America, and Europe, and became active in left-wing politics as a writer for magazines and websites.

== Syria ==
In mid 2015, Taylor travelled to Syria to report on the first anniversary of the Sinjar massacre of August 2014 for a friend's website. She was so affected by the plight of the refugees she encountered that she resolved to do whatever she could in the fight against Islamic State (ISIS). She returned to England for a short time and then began to study for a master's degree in political theory at Stockholm University, but in March 2016 travelled to Rojava in northern Syria to cover the beginnings of the Kurdish women's movement there for a Swedish newspaper. She embraced the anti-capitalist and feminist ideology that she found in the area and decided to abandon her studies and join the Women's Protection Units (YPJ). She is the first British woman to do so. She told The Guardian in February 2017 that her motivations for joining the fight against ISIS were "for the whole world, for humanity and all oppressed people, everywhere."

Since joining the YPJ, Taylor has learned the Kurdish language and trained in weapons and battlefield tactics at their military academy, as well as studying the politics of the region. She has become a member of the YPJ's combat media team, producing photographs and video of YPJ actions, but says: "Actually most of the time I'm not doing any videos at all, but fighting with the unit when we come under attack". She was present at the Battle of Raqqa and after the defeat of ISIS fighters there, has expressed a wish to visit family in the United Kingdom although she risks arrest if she does.
