= Altiplano (2009 film) =

2009 Peruvian-Belgian drama film

- DVD release poster
- Directed by: Peter Brosens; Jessica Woodworth
- Written by: Peter Brosens; Jessica Woodworth
- Produced by: Heino Deckert; Ma.Ja.De Fiction
- Starring: Magaly Solier; Jasmin Tabatabai; Olivier Gourmet
- Cinematography: Francisco Gózon
- Edited by: Nico Leunen
- Distributed by: Imagine Film Distribution (Benelux)
- Release date: 20 May 2009 (Cannes)
- Running time: 109 minutes
- Countries: Peru; Belgium
- Languages: Spanish; Quechua; English; French; Persian

Altiplano is a 2009 Peruvian-Belgian drama film by Peter Brosens and Jessica Woodworth, starring Magaly Solier, Jasmin Tabatabai, and Olivier Gourmet. It takes places on three continents in five different languages. It tells the stories of two women in mourning and how their destinies merge.

== Production and background ==
Shooting took place at locations in Belgium and Peru for 43 days, between June and October 2008. Because of extreme weather conditions at an altitude of 5,000 metres in the Peruvian Andes, the cast and crew had access to a medical team 24 hours a day.

Although the film is fictional, it is inspired by true events that took place in the year 2000 a Peruvian village of Choropampa District. Furthermore, some characters, like Saturnina and Max, are also based on reports and anecdotes of local villagers and foreign doctors.

== Plot ==
Photographer Grace is devastated after being forced to take a picture of the killing of her guide in Iraq. Back in Belgium, she withdraws the picture after it had already been nominated for the Pulitzer Prize. Her husband Max is an oculist and leaves to work at an eye clinic in the Andes in Peru. A local mine spills mercury, causing many people of the nearby village of Turubamba to succumb to illness. Max and his fellow physicians suspect toxins to be the reason for the affliction. They decide to collect more data in Turubamba.

Meanwhile, Saturnina, a young woman from the village loses her fiancé to the contamination. Upon the physicians' arrival, Saturnina's fiancé's mother angrily rejects the doctors' request to examine the body. The villagers turn their rage on the doctors and stone Max to death. Saturnina leads an unsuccessful demonstration against the mine's truck drivers. After the mine's closure, Saturnina commits suicide by drinking mercury and films her death on the camera Max had dropped when he was killed.

Grace sets out on a journey to the place of Max's death. Saturnina's mother welcomes her and offers hospitality. Grace watches the video made by Saturnina. In the end, she partakes in Saturnina's funeral and finally ends her mourning over her husband.

== Cast ==
- Magaly Solier as Saturnina
- Jasmin Tabatabai as Grace
- Olivier Gourmet as Max
- Behi Djanati Atai as Sami
- Edgar Condori as Nilo/Omar
- Sonia Loaiza as mother
- Edgar Quispe as Ignacio
- Norma Martinez as female doctor
- Rodolfo Rodríguez as Raúl

== Reception and awards ==
The film has garnered mainly positive responses and was well-received at the Critics' Week in Cannes.

Altiplano was nominated for two Magritte Awards in the category of Best Film in Coproduction and Best Costume Design for Christophe Pidre and Florence Scholtes, in 2011.

It has also won a number of independent film awards:

- Bangkok International Film Festival 2009: Special Golden Kinnaree Award for Environmental Awareness
- Festival Film Europeen de Virton 2009: Prize of the City Virton
- Lucania Film Festival 2010: Best Feature Film
- Festival de Cinema de Avanca 2010: Best Feature Film
- Festival de Cinema de Avanca 2010: Best Actress for Magaly Solier
- International Film Festival Tofifest 2010: Special Jury Award
