= Girls of the Sun =

2018 film directed by Eva Husson

- Film poster
- Directed by: Eva Husson
- Written by: Eva Husson
- Starring: Golshifteh Farahani
- Release date: 12 May 2018 (Cannes)
- Country: France
- Languages: Kurdish; French; Arabic; English
- Box office: $19,712

Girls of the Sun (French: Les filles du soleil) is a 2018 French war drama film directed by Eva Husson, about Kurdish women fighters battling ISIS to free their homelands. It was selected to compete for the Palme d'Or at the 2018 Cannes Film Festival.

== Cast ==
- Golshifteh Farahani as Bahar
- Emmanuelle Bercot as Mathilde, inspired by Marie Colvin
- Erol Afşin as Tiresh
- Evin Ahmad
- Behi Djanati Atai as Dahlia

== Plot ==
The story is from the perspective of a female French war reporter, Mathilde who travels to Kurdistan to meet Kurdish resistance groups fighting ISIS. She meets Bahar, who leads the Gordyene Unit, a women's resistance militia composed of former captives of ISIS.

The story flashbacks to Bahar's life before the war when she had a husband and son, and worked as a lawyer, enjoying a happy life. One night their town gets raided by ISIS terrorists who line up all the men against a wall and shoot them, and take the women and children as captives. The children are taken away, while the women are raped. Bahar's sister commits suicide after she is raped by a ISIS jihadi. One day, Bahar sees the TV interview of a woman activist Dahlia Saeed who says she rescues captured women and announces her number for anyone needing help. Using a hidden phone, she texts Saeed for help, who arranges for her and 3 others to be picked up by a paid smuggler during namaz time when the ISIS fighters are busy praying. He then drives them out of ISIS territory.

Back in the present, the Gordyene Unit detects some ISIS fighters approaching their position, and fight them off. In the fire fight, one of the girls is killed and they capture one ISIS fighter. They realise the ISIS fighters got close to their positions by using tunnels.

The captured ISIS fighter informs them that ISIS forces have withdrawn from a nearby town, but a few are still holding a school with some 20 children who are being brainwashed and trained to become child soldiers. Bahar believes her son might be among them, and makes a plan to attack the school via tunnels to try and free the children. They force the captured ISIS fighter to show them the way. Mathilde follows the fighting team with her camera.

After emerging from the other end of the tunnel, the Gordyene Unit enters into a firefight and neutralises the ISIS fighters. The next day, they continue house to house operations, and come across a building containing a number of children, who they manage to help escape to safety. During the door to door clearance, Bahar finds her son, while Mathilde gets injured. The film ends with Mathilde getting evacuated and bidding goodbye to Bahar, who is holding her son in one arm and her gun in another.

== Reception ==
The film was nominated for the Palme d'Or at the 2018 Cannes Film Festival. On review aggregator website Rotten Tomatoes, the film holds an approval rating of 46%, based on 50 reviews, and an average rating of 5.8/10. The site's critical consensus reads, "Girls of the Sun has the best of intentions, but this worthy - and thoroughly timely - story is fatally undermined by its clumsily overbearing execution." Agnès Poirier noted that the film initially received "high praise at Cannes" but later "an overwhelming majority of we critics found the film appalling: dreadfully written, poorly directed, verging on obscenity for treating tragedy with Valkyrie-like music and aestheticised images".

== See also ==
- The Kerala Story
- Caliphate (TV series)
- Kobanê (film)
