= For a Moment, Freedom =

2008 film

For a Moment Freedom
- Directed by: Arash T. Riahi
- Written by: Arash T. Riahi
- Produced by: Veit Heiduschka, Michael Katz, Wega Film, Margaret Menegoz, Les Films du Losange
- Starring: Navid Akhavan; Pourya Mahyari; Elika Bozorgi; Sina Saba; Payam Madjlessi; Behi Djanati Atai; Kamran Rad; Said Oveissi; Fares Fares; Ezgi Asaroglu; Toufan Manoutcheri; Michael Niavarani; Soussan Azarin; Johannes Silberschneider
- Cinematography: Michael Riebl
- Edited by: Karina Ressler
- Music by: Karuan
- Distributed by: Les Films du Losange
- Release dates: 29 August 2008 (WFF); 9 January 2009 (Austria); 28 January 2009 (France)
- Running time: 110 minutes
- Countries: Austria; France
- Languages: English; Persian; Turkish

For a Moment Freedom (German: Ein Augenblick Freiheit; French: Pour un instant la liberté) is a 2008 film, written and directed by Austrian-Iranian filmmaker Arash T. Riahi.

== Synopsis ==
For a Moment Freedom tells of the odyssey of three Iranians groups of refugees: a married couple with a child, two young men with two children, and two men who are friends despite the differences between them.

They have all managed to escape from Iran and Iraq, but now they are stuck in the Turkish capital; although freedom is at last almost within their grasp, first they have to wait in a dubious hotel, hoping each day that their applications for asylum will be approved. This enforced break in their journey towards independence is characterised by both hope and utter uncertainty.

The young Austrian-Iranian filmmaker Arash T. Riahi depicts the plight of people trying to flee their homeland and the curious, transitory state of asylum-seekers with tragic comedy and great suspense.

== Cast ==
| Actor | Role |
|---|---|
| Navíd Akhavan | Ali |
| Pourya Mahyari | Mehrdad |
| Elika Bozorgi | Azy |
| Sina Saba | Arman |
| Payam Madjlessi | Hassan |
| Behi Djanati Atai | Lale |
| Kamran Rad | Kian |
| Said Oveissi | Abbas |
| Fares Fares | Manu |
| Ezgi Asaroglu | Jasmin |
| Toufan Manoutcheri | Mother of Asy and Arman |
| Michael Niavarani | Father of Asy and Arman |
| Soussan Azarin | Grandmother |
| Muhammed Cangören | Grandfather |
| Kourosh Asadollahi | Ahmad |
| Halilibrahim Sahin | Son of Ahmad |
| Kave Foladi | Prosecutor |
| Johannes Silberschneider | Pifko |

Filming Locations

- Turkey
- Austria
- Germany

== Prizes ==
- 2010 Tromsø International Film Festival's audience award
- Special Jury Award and Special Audience Award at 10° Lecce European Film Festival
- Grande Premio Ficcao - Grand Prize for Best Movie and Premio do Público Ficcao - Publics Prize at the Amazonas Filmfestival/Manaus Brasil
- Mejor Guion - Best Screenplay at 2. Festival Internacional San Luis Cine/Argentinian
- 19. Festival International du Film D'Histoire-Pessac/France
- Prix du Jury Officiel - Main Award of the Jury, Prix du Jury étudiant - Student Award, Prix du Public - Publics Prize

For a Moment Freedom has won two more awards at the Festival du Cinéma Européen en Essonne in France. The film was awarded both the Public Award and the Student Award. This festival, which has been running for the last ten years, specializes in political films.

- the Festival du Cinéma Européen en Essonne
- Best Austrian film 2008 at Viennale 08-International Filmfestival - Vienna Film award

For a Moment Freedom won the Vienna Film Prize for the Best Austrian Film of the year at the 2008 Vienna Film Festival.

- 13è FESTIVAL INTERNATIONAL DES JEUNES REALISATEURS DE SAINT-JEAN-DE-LUZ
- Alain Poire Screenvision Award for Best Director

The prize is named after Alain Poire, the French producer who produced a large number of films, including works by Robert Bresson, Claude Autant-Lara and Yves Robert.

For a Moment Freedom was awarded the Golden Eye, the Award for the Best Debut Feature Film, at the 4th Zurich Film Festival by a jury headed by Peter Fonda. The Zurich Film Festival (ZFF) is one of the most important international festivals for young talent and is held annually in Zurich. The film festival is committed to promoting the works of young directors and screenwriters from all over the world.

Zurich Film Festival

At the renowned "A" festival, the World Film Festival in Montreal, For a Moment Freedom has won an award for the best debut feature film, the Golden Zenith for the Best First Fiction Feature Film 2008.
