= Behi Djanati Atai =

French actress

- Born: Tehran, Iran
- Occupation: Actress
- Years active: 1995–present

Behi Djanati Ataï is a French actress and casting director. She appeared in films For a Moment, Freedom (2008), Welcome (2009), Altiplano (2009), Under the Shadow (2016), Some Like It Veiled (2017), Girls of the Sun (2018) and Green Border (2023).

== Life and career ==
Behi was born in Tehran, Iran. After the Islamic Revolution, her family chose to leave Iran and seek refuge in France. She attended the National School of Theater Arts and Techniques in Paris and later began performing in theatrical productions in France. In 1990s, Behi also began appearing in cinema, playing minor roles in French films. Her first notable role was in the 2001 Australian drama film The Old Man Who Read Love Stories. She starred in the 2008 Austrian drama film For a Moment, Freedom about Iranian groups of refugees. The following year, Behi appeared in films Welcome and Altiplano. In 2016, she co-starred in the critically acclaimed horror film Under the Shadow.

In 2022, Behi had a recurring role during the second season of the Israeli spy thriller series Tehran. In 2023, she starred in the drama film Green Border directed by Agnieszka Holland, playing Afghan English teacher Leila. Her performance was noted by The Film Stage critic.

== Filmography ==
- Jefferson in Paris (1995)
- Ma femme me quitte (1996)
- Golden Boy (1996)
- Vive la mariée... et la libération du Kurdistan (1998)
- The Old Man Who Read Love Stories (2001)
- Bleu le ciel (2001)
- Born in 68 (2008)
- For a Moment, Freedom (2008)
- Welcome (2009)
- Altiplano (2009)
- Les mensonges (2010)
- Callback (2010)
- All Our Desires (2011)
- Spiral (1 episode, 2012)
- Under the Shadow (2016)
- Feu mon corps (2016)
- Some Like It Veiled (2017)
- La fête est finie (2017)
- Girls of the Sun (2018)
- Balthazar (1 episode, 2020)
- Tehran (2 episodes, 2022)
- Green Border (2023)
- Prisoner 951 (Television miniseries, 2025)
