= Videoex =

Annual fill festival in Zurich, Switzerland

Videoex is a Zürich-based Film festival for Experimental film and Video art. Starting in 1988, it is dedicated to the genre of experimental film. It occurs every year during the last two weeks of May.

The festival usually consists of a Swiss and an international competition, retrospectives of artists, a program dedicated to one or more filmmakers and a guest program. Besides its film program Videoex also hosts expanded cinema live acts, performances, discussions and workshops.

== History ==
Videoex took place for the first time in December 1998 as a one-week experimental film screening at the cinema Xenix in Zürich. A manifold program has evolved that attracts an international audience and the number of submitted film and video works has increased every year. In 2008 more than 1800 works from over 50 countries were submitted.

== Awards and jury ==
The awards and jury members over the years are listed below.

	International Awards	Jury for International Awards	Swiss Awards
2020	Juana Robles, Max Philipp Schmid	Jorge Jácome	Adam Jasper, Majid Movasseghi
2019	Christine Hürzeler	Takashi Makino	Joke Ballintijn, Lucas Murari, Sebastián Díaz Morales
2018	Silas Heizmann, Kezia Zurbrügg & Philipp Ritler	Daniel Jacoby & Yu Araki	Caspar Stracke, Diana Vidrascu, Greg de Cuir Jr
2017	Ismail Bahri, Laure Prouvost	Ximena Cuevas, Richard Ashrowan, Richard Bott	Josh Weissbach, Aurèle Ferrier
2016	-	-	Tom Bogaert, Jela Hasler
2015	Zapruder filmmakersgroup	Adam Szymczyk, Kim Knowles, Pieter-Paul Mortier	Max Philipp Schmid
2014	Basma Alsharif, Sam Firth	Ute Aurand, Stephen Partridge	Lukas Gut
2013	Jesse McLean	Aleksandra Sekulić, Sanja Grbin, Romeo Grünfelder	Pauline Julier
2012	Angela Reginato	Jaap Pieters, Piero Pala, Dan Oki	Pauline Cazorla
2011	Florence Aigner & Laurent Van Lancker, Till Roeskens	Maria Palacios Cruz, Seppo Renvall, Georges Salameh	Sabine Haerri
2010	Jürgen Reble, Inger Lise Hansen	Julia Marx, Marcel Schwierin	Ariane Andereggen
2009	Sebastian Diaz Morales	Mika Taanila, Sebestyén Kodolányi, Jeremy Rigsby	Klaus Fromherz
2008	Hito Steyerl	Erwin van’t Hart, Robert Buchschwenter, Alexandra Gramatke	Marie- Catherine Theiler & Jan Peters
2007	-	-	Elodie Pong, Rolf Hellat
2006	Arash T. Riahi	Frédérique Devaux, Sébastien Ronceray, Stefanie Schulte-Strathaus	Michael Sasdi
2005	Laura Waddington	Christine Noll Brinkmann, Barbara Pichler, Brent Klinkum	Ingo Giezendanner
2004	Rachel Reupke	Michael Brynntrup, Norbert Pfaffenbichler, Florian Wüst	Ariane Andereggen
2003	François Bucher (USA)	Yann Beauvais, Caspar Stracke, Suzanne Buchan	Max Philipp Schmid & Beat Brogle
2002	Three awards ex aequo: Steve Matheson, Dominic Gagnon, Laura Waddington	Peter Mettler, Arjon Dunnenwind, Mike Hoolboom	Nicoletta Wartmann
2001	Emily Vey Duke / Cooper Battersby	Gudrun Sommer, Robert Anderson, Rein Wolfs	Gabriela Gerber & Lukas Bardill
2000	Three awards ex aequo: Dan Oki, Mark Roth, Walid Raad	Daniel Kurjakovic, Hanspeter Ammann, Franziska Oliver	Two awards ex aequo: David Renggli, Jessie Fischer
1998	-	-	-

== Program ==
The programs for each year are listed below.

	Specials	Swiss Focus	Guest Cities/Country Program
2020	Charlotte Prodger, Flatform, Laure Prouvost	collectif fact	Argentina
2019	Barbara Hammer, Jonas Mekas	Uriel Orlow	Brazil
2018	Salomé Lamas, Filipa César	Pauline Boudry / Renate Lorenz	African Metropolises
2017	Omer Fast, Jean Rouch, Samuel Beckett	Werner von Mutzenbecher	Mexico
2016	Kenneth Anger, Laurie Anderson	Ursula Biemann	Beirut
2015	Hito Steyerl, Gregory Markopoulos	Elodie Pong	Portugal
2014	John Akomfrah, Ute Aurand, Robert Beavers	Katarina Schröter	Italy
2013	Carolee Schneemann, Jean-Luc Godard, Chris Marker	-	Belgrad und Zagreb
2012	George Kuchar, Mike Kelley (artist), Miranda Pennell, Mike Hoolboom	Klaus Lutz	Warsaw and Lodz
2011	Bruce Conner, Herbert Fritsch	Rudolph Burckhardt	Brussels
2010	Johan Grimonprez	Clemens Klopfenstein	Rotterdam and Amsterdam
2009	Gustav Deutsch	Unabhängiges Video Schweiz (UVS)	Helsinki
2008	-	Videofemmes	London
2007	Béla Balázs Studio (BBS)	-	Geneva
2006	Sarah Morris, Marie Menken, Jaap Pieters	Swiss Experimental Films of the Sixties and Seventies	Paris
2005	Owen Land, Carolee Schneemann	-	-
2004	Harun Farocki	Isa Hesse-Rabinovitch	-
2003	Mike Hoolboom, Stan Brakhage	Peter Liechti	-
2002	Michael Snow, Doug Aitken	Peter Mettler	-
2001	Bruce Conner, Pat O'Neill (filmmaker), Nam June Paik, Oskar Fischinger	-	-
2000	Craig Baldwin, Mike Kelley, Vito Acconci, Ito Takashi	-	-
1998	John Maybury, Tony Oursler, Bill Viola, Helga Fanderl		

== Partners and sponsors ==
Videoex is organized by the non-profit association Videoex and supported by private and public funding agencies. The festival became a regional institution of the Canton of Zürich in 2012, and has been incorporated into the cultural mission statement of the City of Zürich.
