= Green border =

Poorly protected section of a national border

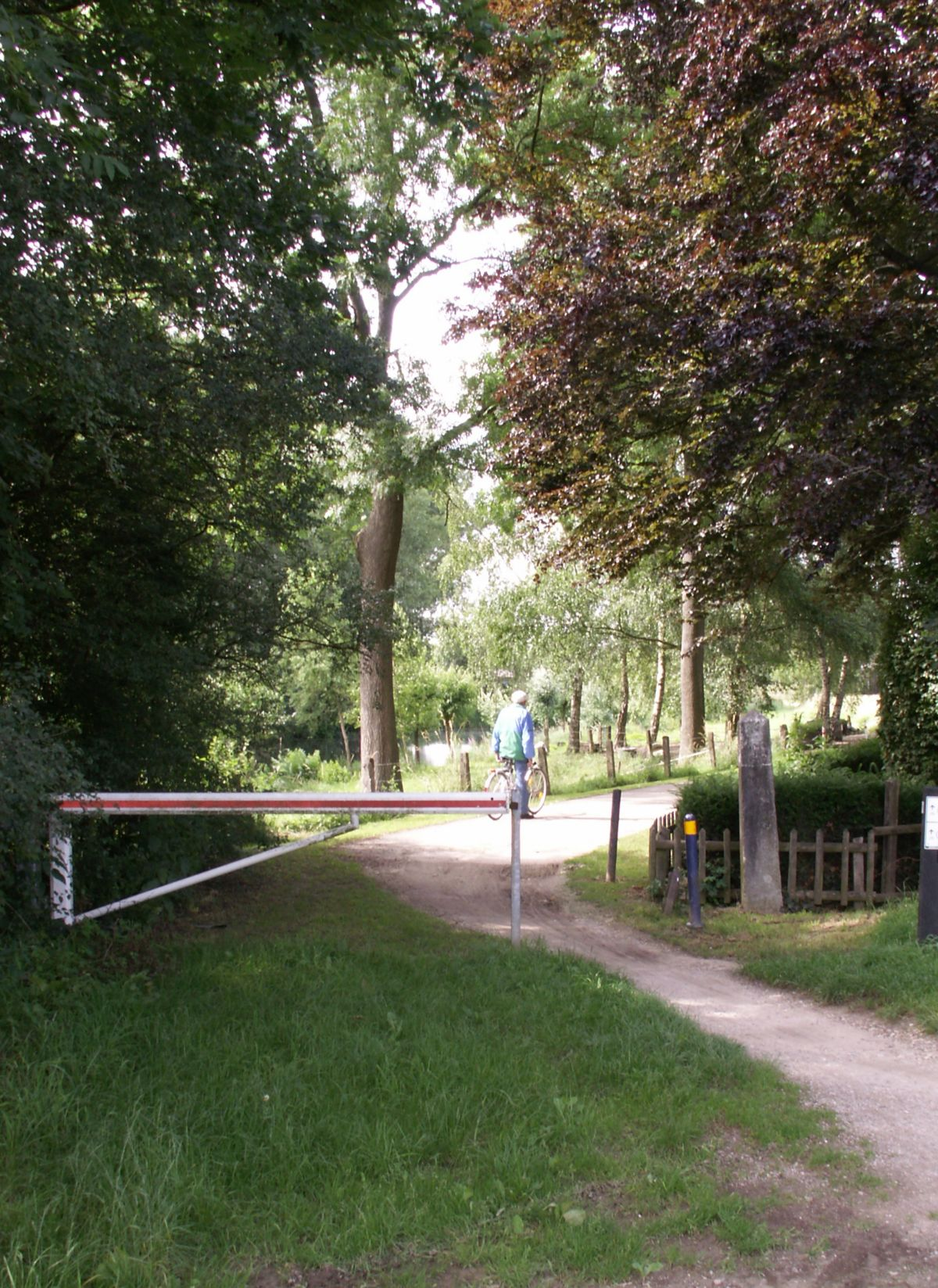
The green border between Germany and Netherlands close to Wassenberg

A green border is a weakly protected section of the national border. The term green border comes from the area covered with vegetation: green borders are usually forests, thickets and meadows, often with varied terrain.

The act of (illegal) crossing to the green border is associated with the phenomenon of smuggling goods and persons of a criminal nature, but it has sometimes also been politically motivated. Green borders are and have been crossed by participants of the political activists illegally operating in their countries to contact with foreign collaborators, allies, emigres and the like, or to emigrate and seek refuge.

== Green border in Schengen zone ==
Green borders exist within the European Union as the state borders internal to the European Union, crossed by tourists outside the area of former border crossings. After the Schengen Agreement became effective, crossing borders between countries where the agreement applies is allowed at every section of the border. Article 22 of the Schengen Borders Code mentions this. Only persons without EU citizenship who do not have a visa to enter the whole territory are excluded from this regulation.

== England-Wales border ==
The England-Wales border roughly aligns with green ancient earthwork Offa's Dyke, now Offa's Dyke Path, part of which transects the Forest of Dean. The border between England and Wales has been uncontrolled since at least the 16th Century Laws in Wales Acts 1535 and 1542 and has been reclaimed by nature.
