= Stanisław Żaryn (politician) =

Polish politician (born 1984)

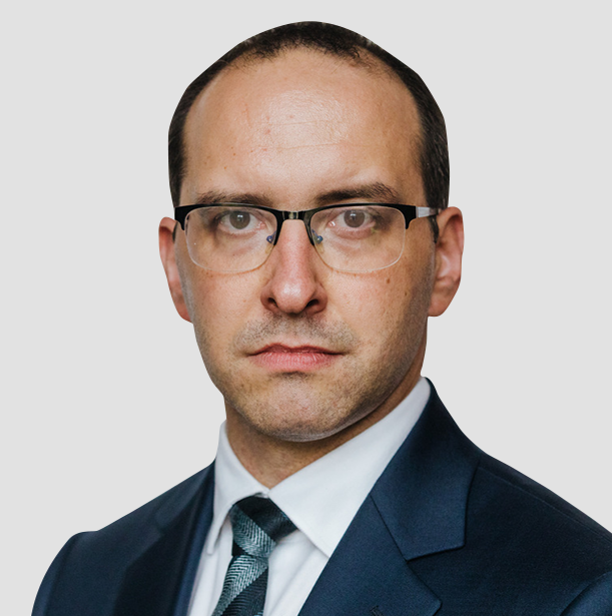
- Stanisław Żaryn (2022)

Vice-Minister
- In office 2022-09-22 – 2023
- President: Andrzej Duda

Personal details
- Born: 16 July 1984 (age 41) Warsaw, Poland
- Education: University of Warsaw
- Occupation: government official, journalist

Stanisław Żaryn (born July 16, 1984, in Warsaw) is a Polish government official and journalist. From 2022 to 2023 he was a vice-minister in the Chancellery of the Prime Minister of Poland. In January 2024 Żaryn became an advisor to Andrzej Duda, President of Poland.

In August 2023 in his capacity as Deputy Minister-Coordinator of Special Services Żaryn warned of a resurgence in Russian espionage and that Russian intelligence agencies had made new attempts to recruit people for their efforts against Poland.
