= Battle of Sarrin =

Battle of Sarrin may refer to two battles which were fought during the Syrian civil war in the first half of 2015, in and around the town of Sarrin in northern Syria.

These two battles are:

- Battle of Sarrin (March–April 2015), conducted by Kurdish YPG and allied forces against the Islamic State of Iraq and the Levant (ISIL) in an effort to capture the town and the surrounding region
- Battle of Sarrin (June–July 2015), in which the Kurdish YPG and Free Syrian Army forces captured the town of Sarrin and the surrounding region from the Islamic State of Iraq and the Levant (ISIL)
