= Olivia Ciappa =

French photographer and film director

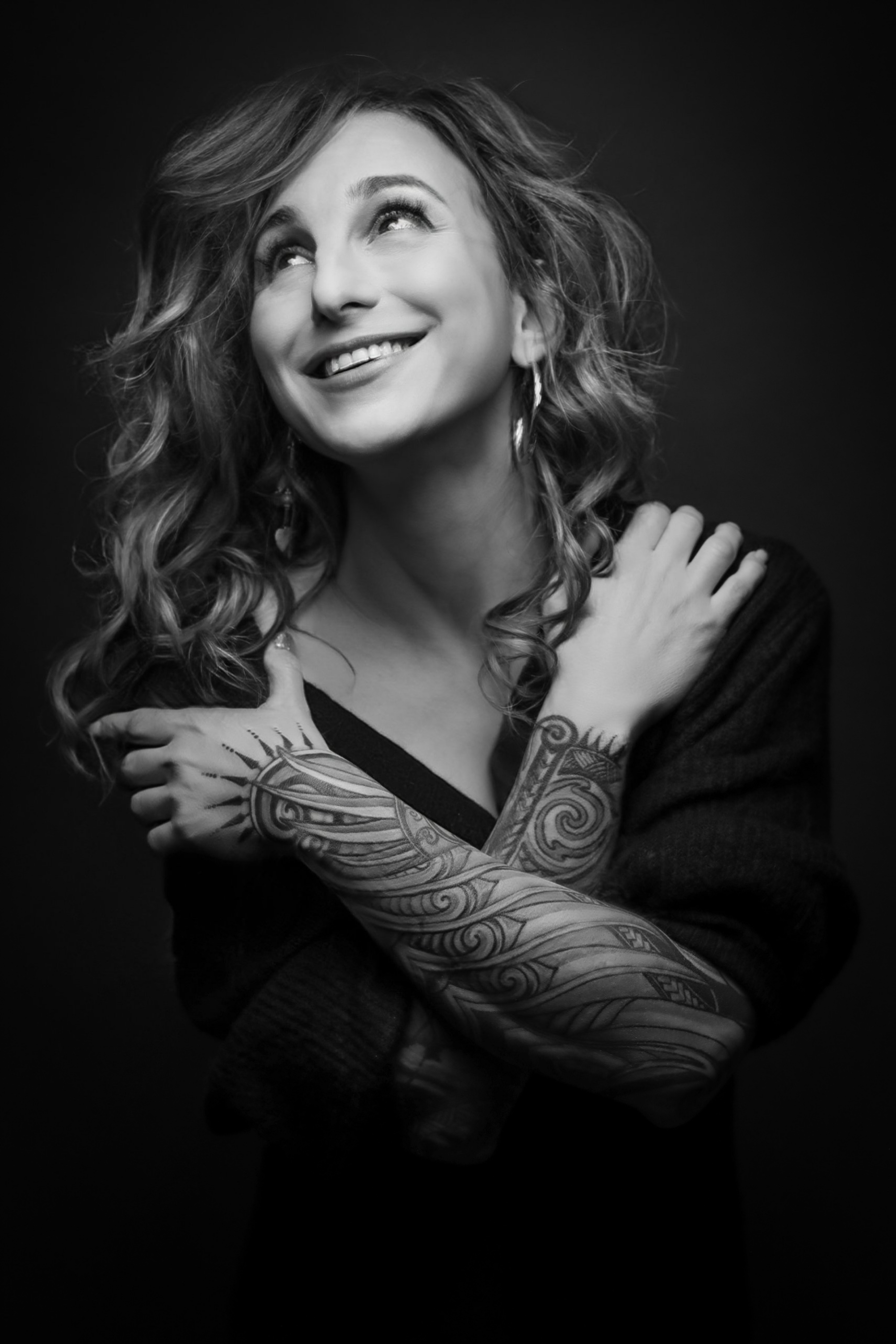
- Portrait of Olivia Ciappa, taken by Mathieu Camille Collin in november 2021
- Born: 17 March 1979 (age 47); Marseille, Provence-Alpes-Côte d'Azur, France
- Occupations: Film director, fine art artist, novelist
- Years active: 2003–present

Olivia Ciappa (French pronunciation: [ɔlivja sjapa], 17 March 1979) is a French photographer and film director. She is a director of short films, a director of musicals for the theater, illustrator of books for children, producer and director of documentaries, journalist of cinema, photographer also creator of stamps.

Olivia Ciappa is in particular the director of movies: Fabulous fate of Perrine Martin, To my brother and The case of Ô;. Selected to draw "the face of France" the Marianne stamp seen on 15 billion French stamps, Ciappa then went on to create her photography exhibition "Imaginary Couples", promoting a positive view of homosexuality.

== Works ==
=== Director ===
Ciappa directed stage theatre, two musicals, four live action movies, including A Mon Frère - "In Memory of My Brother"., Official France entry selection at the 82d Academy Award for Best Live Action Short Film, and one animated short for Disney Animation Studios.

=== Novels ===
In December 2015, the biggest French publishing company L'Harmattan published her novel "Il Était Deux Frères". Because of the novel's huge success, it quickly became out of stock everywhere.

=== Official French president's Marianne ===
Each newly elected President of France is permitted to select an artist to design the "Marianne" (the most common French postage stamp). When newly elected François Hollande indicated he would like to choose Ciappa, a controversy ensued. This honor is usually reserved for more established artists, much later in their careers. Hollande felt the best way forward was to allow all France's young generation (all of its high school students) to select the artist. As the students made their choice, Ciappa was selected by every high school in the country. Her stamp is now known throughout France, and the drawings have been widely displayed including an exhibition at the French White House.

=== Fine Art Photography ===
==== Imaginary Couples ====
During 2012, as the debate over legalizing gay marriage in France became very polarizing to the French people, Ciappa looked for a way to bring a more positive image of gay love to a homophobic public. Her concept was to show loving people – and challenge others to see this love as anything other than the love of two people. The result is an exhibition of black and white photographs, which has seen unprecedented public displays throughout the country, including at the Place de Republique and the Hotel de Ville in Paris. The photographs feature straight people posing as same sex couples, and include leading athletes, film stars and political figures. With that exhibition, Olivia Ciappa became the youngest person to be on the cover of France's biggest newspaper Le Figaro. A sampling of the photographs are attached below.

Because of the positive impact the exhibition has had throughout France, the French President and the French government are taking the exhibition all over the world, from US to Canada, Peru, Brazil.

==== International version ====
Now, through an arrangement between the Mayor of Los Angeles, the Embassy of France and the French Consul General of Los Angeles, "Imaginary Couples" is coming to Los Angeles, where it will be displayed at the Los Angeles Public Library. Ciappa is currently in Los Angeles with the hope of including American athletes and celebrities in the upcoming installations of the exhibition.

==== Fait à la main ====
During 2014, Olivia Ciappa created "Fait à la main", a new exhibition ephemeral concept only for one night: black&white pictures shown at the exact location it was shot, with the models standing by in the same position. This new pictures shows naked CrossFit champions. After the success of the exhibition, Ciappa created the international worldwide calendar.

==== Imaginary Couples, the canadian version ====
May 2015, Olivia Ciappa creates "Les Couples Imaginaires québecois". Two years before, TV host Monique Giroux discovers the Imaginary Couples exhibition. Seeing the gigantic impact on the French society, she decides to take the exhibition to Montreal and creates new Imaginary Couples in collaboration with TV host Dany Turcotte. She made an association with the French Embassy, IBM and Desjardin bank. Together, they ask Olivia Ciappa to adapt her French exhibition with Canadian celebrities. We can see such personalities as Eva Longoria, Véronique Cloutier, Claude Legault, Lara Fabian, Dan Bigras, Etienne Boulay

. December 2013, Olivia Ciappa goes to Montreal to take pictures of their biggest singers, actors, politicians and TV hosts. It will take the French Consul a year and a half to create the biggest exhibition ever attended in Montreal. During the shooting, celebrities started to tweet making of pictures and parts of the final work. Due to the success of their posts, it was decided that all pictures would be removed and no interview would be given until the exhibition. It was then decided that there would be two exhibitions : a public one at the Complexe Desjardins, the biggest place in Montreal. And a more elitist exhibition, at the Montreal Museum of Art. Just before the exhibition, le Huffington Post reveals that no sport champion accepted to be part of the exhibition because of sport's homophobia The information became big in newspapers and Olivia Ciappa send a radio message to ask sports champions to change their mind. Few hours later, football champion Etienne Boulay calls Radio Canada and accepts the photoshoot. He then came to Radio Canada to explain his change of mind after viewing the peaceful images of the exhibition.

==== The Montreal Museum of Art : Tombé dans l'Oeil ====
Le Musée des Beaux Arts de Montréal presents in 2015 a new kind of exhibition were the old museum masterpieces would be put together to create Imaginary Couples. With headphones, the people coming to the museum would hear imaginary stories between the characters of the paintings.

==== Quebec City : La Photo qui parle ====
In September 2015, Quebec City presents a new version of the Imaginary Couples Exhibition. All visitors heard interviews of the artist and the models while they were discovering the pictures in the exhibition. Videos were adding to the presentation with making of images .

== Personal life ==
In April 2021, Olivia Ciappa announced her gender transition and documents the process on her social media accounts.

== Filmography ==
=== Director ===
- 2002 : Le fabuleux destin de Perrine Martin
- 2003 : Le cas d'O
- 2009 : A Mon Frère - "In Memory of My Brother" A Mon Frère. Official France entry selection at the 82d Academy Award for Best Live Action Short Film
- 2010 : Disney animated project Princess Academy.

Music composed by 8 times Academy Award winner Alan Menken. The movie project was transformed into the global Disney phenomenon TV show "Princess Sofia"

=== Stage Director ===
- 2006 : Revolution. Musical.
- 2007 : Le Cabaret des Hommes Perdus. Musical. Winner of best musical and best author at the Molières Awards
