= Biografilm Festival =

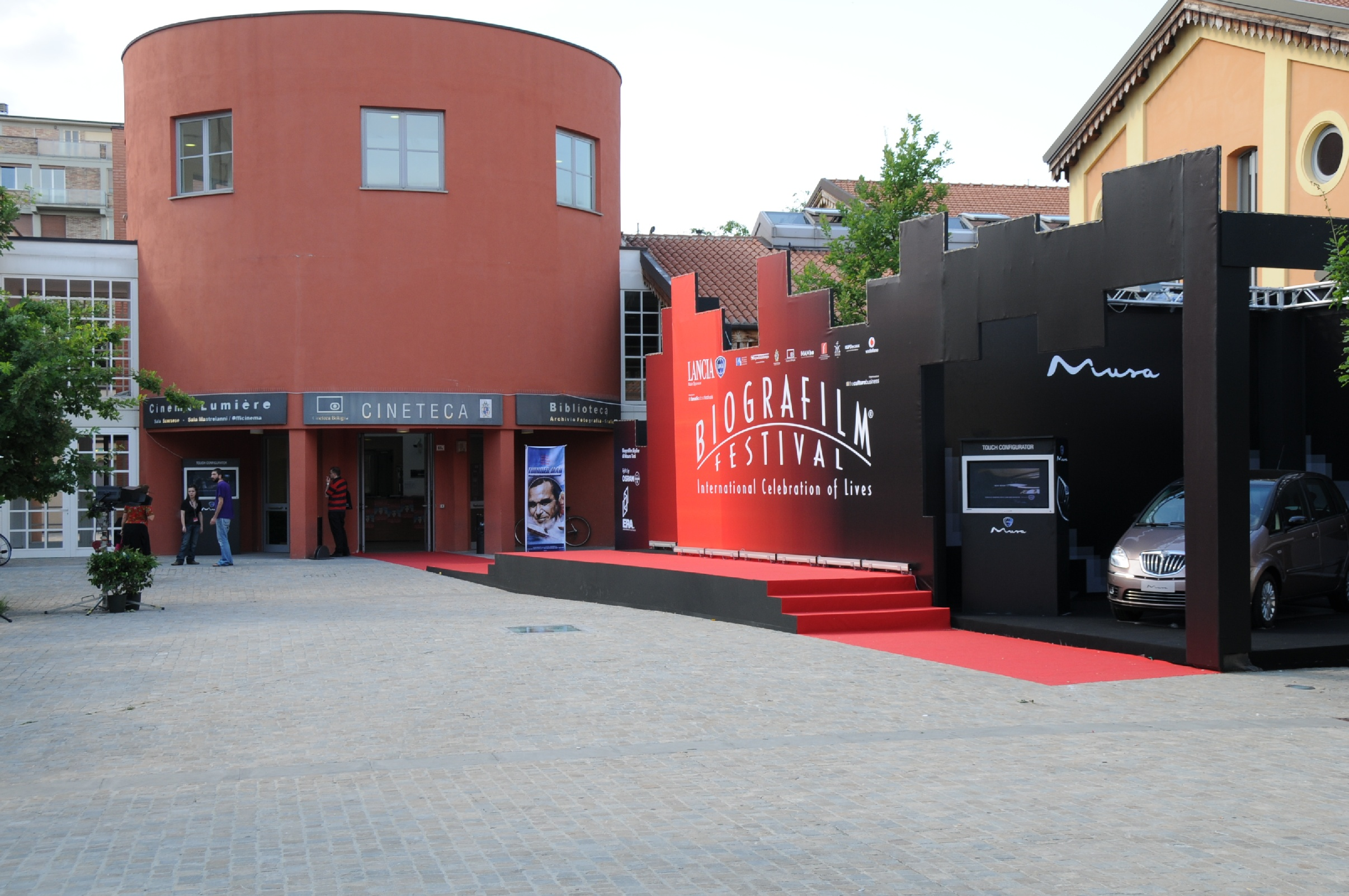
- Biografilm's red carper in 2008
- Location: Bologna, Italy
- Established: 2005
- Directors: Andrea Romeo (honorary), Massimo Mezzetti (general director)
- Artistic director: Massimo Benvegnù, Chiara Liberti
- Website: www.biografilm.it

Biografilm Festival is an international film festival held in Bologna, Italy, dedicated to biographies, documentaries, and life stories.

== Profile ==
The festival was founded in 2005. Fully titled International Celebration of Lives, it focuses on world's best biographical and documentary films. Biografilm is the only international event of that kind, with the time it grew into a high-profile venue and hosts important world premieres.

Biografilm is managed by Associazione Fanatic About Festivals. Since 2013, Biografilm has been directed by Andrea Romeo. In 2018, Romeo stepped down, preserving a post of an honorary director, and was replaced by Leena Pasanen, former head of DOK Leipzig. 5 years later Pasanen retired, she was succeeded by Massimo Benvegnù and Chiara Liberti.

In 2010, the festival introduced two new competition sections, voted by the audience: Biografilm and Biografilm Italia. Later, in 2014, Biografilm Europa was separated into an independent section dedicated to the movies by filmmakers from the European Union. Since 2014, the fiction biopics have been included. The festival's sections are: Concorso Internazionale (International Competition), Concorso Italia (Italian Competition), Biografilm Europa (European fiction films), Contemporary Lives (documentaries on actual international topics and issues), Biografilm Music (pre-premiere screenings of music stars biopics), Biografilm Art (pre-premiere screenings of biopics, dedicated to art personalities), Best of Fest (a selection of world best documentaries), Storie Italiane (a selection dedicated to most influential persons in Italian culture).

As of 2024, in the International Competition the awards are: Best Film, Best First Film, Special Mention, and Audience Award. In the Italian Competition, the awards are: BPER Award for Best Film, “New Talents” Award, Audience Award, and Special Mention. Other awards are: Young Critics Award, SNCCI Italian Critics’ Prize, Unseen Italy Ucca Prize, Guerrilla Staff Award; three awards are given by the audience: for Best Film in the Contemporary Lives Competition, for Best Film in the Biografilm Art & Music Competition, and for Film in the Europa Oltre i Confini Competition.

In 2014, the festival inaugurated its industry section, Bio to B, that connects emerging filmmakers and cinema professionals, producers and distributors. Bio to B hosts a pitching forum, various showcasing events, business meetings, masterclasses, etc. After 10 editions, more than 148 projects have found partners for development and production.

Biografilm Park is an entertainment program that offers various outdoor music events.

Biografilm Campus unites educational initiatives led by the festival. Many of them target vulnerable social groups. For example, ‘Tutta un’altra storia’ is a social inclusion project dedicated to children in difficult life situations. The jury is composed of teenagers from juvenile penal institutions. With Alma Mater Studiorium Università di Bologna, in 2023 Biografilm Academy launched an educational program on Film Festival Management. ‘Bring the change’ is a collaboration between high school kids and neurodivergent teenagers.

== Editions ==
=== 2015 ===
The 11th edition ran from 5 to 15 June 2015, under the motto ‘Connected lives – from the end of privacy to collective knowledge’. The line-up featured Citizenfour by Laura Poitras, Amy by Asif Kapadia, Steve McQueen: The Man & Le Mans by John McKenna and Gabriel Clarke, Going Clear by Alex Gibney. Danish documentary filmmaker Michael Madsen received the Celebration of Lives Award.

=== 2020 ===
The 16th edition went online due to quarantine measures amidst the COVID-19 pandemic. The Grand Prix went to Walchensee Forever by Janna Ji Wonders; Jury Special Mention Hera “Nuovi Talenti” was given to Noodle Kid (La Yi Wan Mian) by Huo Ning and Wake Up On Mars by Dea Gjinovci.

=== 2021 ===
The 17th edition of the festival ran from 4 to 14 June 2021. The line-up featured 106 titles from 44 countries, among them 17 world premieres. 13 projects participated in Bio to B Industry Days.

=== 2022 ===
The 18th edition of the festival ran from 10 to 20 June 2022, with an attendance exceeding 15,000 and a line-up of more than 90 titles, including several premieres. After a revolution by Giovanni Buccomino won the Grand Prix in the International competition, while the Best First Film Award went to Máté Kőrösi for Divas, Beautiful Beings. In the Italy Competition, the BPER Award for Best Film was given to I Never Went Back by Silvana Costa. Jury Special Mention – Il canto delle cicale by Marcella Piccinini.

=== 2023 ===
The 18th edition of the festival ran from 9 to 19 June 2023, it was titled 'Essere e Avere', trans. 'To be and to have'. The program included 83 titles and 17 world premieres. Roberta Torre and Nicolas Philibert received Celebration of Lives Award.

=== 2024 ===
The 20th edition is scheduled for 7–17 June 2024 with 77 titles in program and 19 world premieres. Olivier Assayas will be honoured with the Celebration of Lives Award.
