= Laurence Bowen =

British television and film producer

Laurence J. Bowen is a British television and film producer.

== Career ==
After graduating from Oxford University in the 1980s, Bowen began his television career working for Bill Bryden at BBC Scotland as a researcher and trainee script editor before moving on to run the development arm of non-profit organisation First Film Foundation which he helped set up to champion new writers and film makers backed by a board that included Jeremy Thomas, David Putnam and Roland Joffé. In 1993 he left to work for Simon Curtis in the BBC where he produced Paradise (with Penny Downie and Dave Hill) for BBC2.

Soon after he was appointed Head of Drama at Diverse Productions where he went on to produce The Hello Girls, Stone, Scissors, Paper (with Juliet Stevenson and Ken Stott, winner of the inaugural Dennis Potter Award) and Dual Balls (nominated for Bafta Film Award). Bowen and Philip Clarke then founded production company Feelgood Fiction in 1997. Bowen won a BAFTA for My Life as a Popat and a BAFTA nomination for Suburban Shootout together with RTS, Broadcast and Chicago Film Festival awards, Prix Jeunesse, Rose D'or, Emmy and BANFF nominations and most recently the Monte Carlo Golden Nymph for Best International Producer of the Year.

Bowen's Producer and Executive Producer credits at Feelgood also include The Hello Girls (Series 2), Badger, Miranda, one-off TV films Double Bill, The English Harem by Anthony McCarten, George and Bernard Shaw (with Richard Griffiths and Robert Lindsay (actor)) and comedy series Gates for Sky UK.

Gates was acquired by Warner Brothers and NBC and a US pilot commissioned written by Cathy Yuspa and Josh Goldstein and directed by Mark Buckland. A US version of Suburban Shootout was developed by HBO and a pilot commissioned written by Michelle Ashford and directed by Barry Sonnenfeld. My Life as a Popat was acquired by Nickelodeon. All three series were co-created and executive produced by Bowen.

While at Feelgood, Bowen also produced the BAFTA nominated BBC drama "Found" and executive produced the BAFTA-winning BBC "Lizard Girl".

In 2016 he produced feature film The Eichmann Show starring Martin Freeman and Anthony LaPaglia with Paul Andrew Williams directing, financed by the BBC and distributed by The Weinstein Company in the US.

His "Unmade Movies" season of world premiere productions of lost screenplays by the greatest writers of the Twentieth Century was commissioned by BBC Radio 4. James McAvoy, Mark Strong, Hugh Laurie, David Suchet, Glenda Jackson, Anne-Marie Duff, Vanessa Kirby, Ellie Bamber, Rose Leslie, Michael Sheen, Nikesh Patel, Meera Syal and Rebecca Front have starred in dramas by Orson Welles, Alfred Hitchcock, Harold Pinter, Ernest Lehman, Dennis Potter, Alexander Mackendrick, Jay Presson Allen and Arthur Miller. Directed by Richard Eyre, Jamie Lloyd, Mark Gatiss, Joanna Hogg, Hope Dickson Leach and Adrian Noble.

Bowen launched new production company Dancing Ledge Productions with backing from FremantleMedia in June 2016 and a development deal with Martin Freeman.

Dancing Ledge Productions produced "Porters" for UKTV / Dave starring Rutger Hauer, Susan Wokoma, Edward Easton, Claudia Jessie, Daniel Mays and Sanjeev Bhaskar and written by Dan Sefton. The series was recommissioned in 2018 with Camilla Whitehill and Lee Coan joining as writers.

Dancing Ledge also co-produced the UK shoot of The New Pope for Wildside directed by Paolo Sorrentino starring Jude Law and John Malkovich for HBO and Sky Italia.

It is the first UK TV company to introduce a Writer In Residence programme and has one of the UK's largest mentoring schemes for new writing talent with the ITV and ScreenSkills High-end TV Skills Fund. Mentors include Jesse Armstrong, Sarah Phelps, Jed Mercurio, Paul Abbott, Jimmy McGovern, Sally Wainwright, Levi David Addai, Jack Thorne, Abby Ajayi, Charlie Covell and Kay Mellor.

Dancing Ledge developed Netflix's Delhi Crime with Golden Karavan and Ivanhoe Pictures, premiering at Sundance in January 2019, written and directed by Richie Mehta. In 2020 the series won the Best International Drama Series Award in the International Emmys.

In 2020 Bowen co-Executive Produced with Chris Carey event drama The Salisbury Poisonings for the BBC following the true life story of the Novichok chemical attack in 2018.

The series went on to become the highest rating new drama launch on the BBC for six years. and won with FremantleMedia the Broadcast Magazine International Sales Of The Year Award selling to over 140 territories.

In 2021 the BBC commissioned six part crime drama The Responder written by Tony Schumacher and starring Martin Freeman co-Executive Produced by Laurence Bowen and Chris Carey. The Responder secured ratings of over 10 million viewers and won Best Drama in the 2022 Edinburgh International Television Awards. In 2023 The Responder was nominated for 6 Bafta TV Awards including Best Writer, Best Actor, Best Supporting Actor, Best Supporting Actress, Best Writer, Best TV Drama Series and Best Music. Martin Freeman then went on to win the International Emmy for Best Actor. Series 2 of The Responder started shooting in September 2023 and was broadcast in May 2024 on BBC1 and released on BBC iPlayer. Martin Freeman was nominated for a second BAFTA for his performance in it in 2025.

Dancing Ledge also recently produced Wedding Season for Disney+ starring Rosa Salazar and written by Oli Lyttleton. It launched on Disney+ and Hulu on 8 September 2022. BBC1 thriller Crossfire written by Louise Doughty and starring Keeley Hawes launched on BBC1 on 20 September 2022 and has currently sold to 152 countries earning FremantleMedia a Broadcast nomination for Best Global Sales 2023.

Dancing Ledge was shortlisted in the 2021 Broadcast Awards Best Emerging Independent Production Company category and won a Highly Commended Award. In 2023 it won Best Independent Production Company at the Edinburgh Television Festival Awards and was shortlisted as Best UK Independent Production Company in the Broadcast Awards. In 2025 the company won the Broadcast Award for Best Place To Work in TV.

In 2024 Bowen Executive Produced with Chris Carey Big Mood for Channel 4 written by Camilla Whitehill and starring Nicola Coughlan and Lydia West. Nicola Coughlan was nominated in 2025 for a BAFTA for her performance in it and the series won the Comedy Guide Award for Best Comedy Drama. Series One of Big Mood was Channel 4 streaming's highest new comedy launch since Derry Girls

In 2024 Bowen also Executive Produced Domino Day for the BBC written by Lauren Sequeira and starring Siena Kelly and Percelle Ascott which was sold to AMC and Platform 7 starring Jasmine Jobson for ITVX adapted from the novel by Louise Doughty.

In 2025 Bowen Executive Produced Series 2 of Big Mood with Chris Carey and factual drama Prisoner 951 for the BBC about the abduction and false imprisonment of Nazanin Zaghari-Ratcliffe and the battle of her husband Richard Ratcliffe to get her freed. It stars Joseph Fiennes and Narges Rashidi, and is directed by Philippa Lowthorpe and written by Stephen Butchard.

Prisoner 951 has gone onto win multiple awards in 2026 including two BAFTAS, three Royal Television Society Awards and the BANFF Rockie Award for Best Limited Series.

Big Mood Series 2 launched in 2026 on Channel 4, Tubi and Stan to great critical acclaim..

In 2026 Dancing Ledge won a further Broadcast Award for Best Place To Work In The UK.

== Suburban Shootout ==
In the US, HBO and now ABC are developing a US version of Suburban Shootout and NBC a US version of Gates. Bowen co-created and is executive producing both shows.
