= Monkey Spunk =

EP by Frazier Chorus
- Released: 1998
- Genre: Alternative pop

Monkey Spunk is a compilation EP by English pop group Frazier Chorus, self-released by the band in 1998. The EP includes five previously unreleased demos (with a few brief interludes) which were recorded following the band's split from Virgin Records but before the recording of the Wide Awake album (1995). This "official bootleg" release was only available through the Frazier Chorus website.

== Track listing ==
All songs written by Tim Freeman.

1. "Christmas Every Year" – 3:24
2. "(Answerphone 1)" – 0:35
3. "I Want You Around" – 3:22
4. "(Wide Awake Control Room Excerpt)" – 0:41
5. "If the Weather Was Up to Me" – 3:00
6. "(Radio Chit-Chat)" – 0:24
7. "So You're Sorry" – 4:23
8. "(Answerphone 2)" – 0:35
9. "Good Grief" – 3:19

== Personnel ==
Musicians

- Tim Freeman
- Jamie Freeman
- Benny Dimassa

Technical

- Richard Digby Smith – engineer
