= Discovery Wings =

Discovery Wings may refer to:

- Wings (Discovery Channel TV series), a long-running educational series on the Discovery Channel
- American Heroes Channel, a U.S. cable television network; formerly "Military Channel", and before that "Discovery Wings".
- Discovery Wings (UK), a UK television channel, which was replaced by Discovery Turbo in 2007
