= Ray (Frazier Chorus album) =

Studio album by Frazier Chorus
- Released: 1991
- Studios: Amazon (Liverpool); Music Station (London); The Windings (Wrexham); Madam X (London); September Sound (London)
- Genre: Pop
- Length: 36:28
- Label: Virgin / Charisma
- Producers: Ian Broudie, Clif Brigden, Frazier Chorus

Frazier Chorus chronology
Sue (1989)	Ray (1991)	Wide Awake (1995)

Singles from Ray
- 1. "Cloud 8" Released: 1990; 2. "Nothing" Released: 1990; 3. "Walking on Air" Released: 1991

Ray is the second album by the English pop group Frazier Chorus, released in 1991 by Virgin Records. A limited edition version of the LP and CD included The Baby Album, a four track bonus remix disc. The four bonus remixes were also appended to the end of the cassette edition. The songs were written by Tim Freeman.

== Critical reception ==
Professional ratings
Review scores
Source	Rating
AllMusic	2.5/5 stars

The St. Petersburg Times opined: "What seems at first play to aspire to be little more than a collection of richly produced but understated songs turns out to be a peculiar, ambitious combination of sweet instrumentation and perversely harsh lyrics." The Boston Globe wrote that "there's mostly, hushed, seductive vocals coasting along lolling, mid-tempo rhythms and consistently ingratiating melodies: wave upon ever-shifting wave"; the paper named it one of the best albums of 1991. The State determined that "Frazier Chorus may specialize in synth pop lite, but there's a certain atmospheric artiness that seduces the listener with its simplicity."

== Track listing ==
All tracks are written by Tim Freeman.

No.	Title	Length
1.	"Cloud 8"	3:46
2.	"Heaven"	3:54
3.	"We Love You"	3:39
4.	"Never Wake Up"	3:43
5.	"All the Air"	3:24
6.	"Walking on Air"	3:02
7.	"Nothing"	4:23
8.	"The Telephone"	3:52
9.	"Here He Comes Again"	3:22
10.	"Prefer You Dead"	3:29
Total length:		36:28

=== The Baby Album ===
No.	Title	Length
1.	"Cloud 8 (Raid Mix)"	4:45
2.	"Nothing (Raid Mix)"	6:26
3.	"Heaven (God Like Instrumental)"	4:27
4.	"Walking on Air (Dub Instrumental)"	3:48
Total length:		19:23

== Personnel ==
Frazier Chorus

- Chris Taplin – programming, guitar
- Kate Holmes – woodwind, EWI, vocals
- Tim Freeman – keyboards, vocals

Additional musicians

- Roddy Lorimer – flugel horn
- Mae McKenna – backing vocals
- Mark Feltham – harmonica
- Reggae Philharmonic Orchestra – strings
- Louis Jardim – percussion
- Greg Fitzgerald – backing vocals
- Michael Timoney – piano
- Chris Haigh – fiddle

Technical

- Ian Broudie – producer (tracks 1–6, 8–10)
- Cenzo Townsend – engineer
- Clif Brigden – co-producer (track 7)
- Frazier Chorus – co-producer (track 7)
- Gordon Vicary – mastering
- Michael Nash Associates – design
- Platon Antoniou – portraits
- Paul Oakenfold – remixing (The Baby Album: tracks 1–2)
- Steve Osborne – engineer (The Baby Album: tracks 1–2)
- Youth – remixing (The Baby Album: tracks 3–4)

== Chart performance ==
Chart	Peak position
UK Albums Chart	66
