= Richard Preddy =

British comedy writer and performer (1966–2020)

Ian Preddy a.k.a. Richard Preddy (3 September 1966 – 7 July 2020) was a British comedy writer and performer, most noted for working in the sketch show Smack the Pony and the sitcom Green Wing. He had a working partnership with fellow writer Gary Howe from 1987 until Preddy's death in 2020.

== Performer ==
All Aboard the Cat Bus on Channel 4's Comedy Lab - (1999)
House of Rock - (2000–02)

== Producer ==
Tommy the Tungsten Robot - (2008)

== Writer ==
ChuckleVision - (1987–2009)
Birds of a Feather - (1989–98)
Smith and Jones - (1989–98)
Tracey Ullman: A Class Act - (1993)
Harry Enfield and Chums - (1994–97)
The Fast Show - (1994-2000)
Ant and Dec Unzipped - (1997)
Sunnyside Farm - (1997)
We Know Where You Live - (1997)
The Morwenna Banks Show - (1998)
The Zig and Zag Show - (1998)
All Aboard the Cat Bus on Channel 4's Comedy Lab - (1999)
Smack the Pony - (1999–2003)
House of Rock - (2000–02)
TV to Go - (2000–02)
Green Wing - (2004–07)
The All Star Comedy Show, later Monkey Trousers - (2004–05)
Man Stroke Woman - (2005–07)
Stupid! - (2005–07)
Campus - (2009–11)
Rastamouse - (2012) (segment "Book Ah Records")
Gates - (2012)
Angry Birds Toons - (2013–16)
Trollied - (2013)
The Amazing World of Gumball - (2015) (segment "The Crew")
Bottersnikes & Gumbles - (2016)
Space Chickens in Space - (2018–19)
Taffy - (2022) (segment "A Maze In and Out"; posthumous credit)
