= Jamie Freeman =

British musician and producer (1965–2022)

- Born: 27 May 1965
- Died: 3 December 2022 (aged 57)
- Genres: Folk
- Occupations: Musician, songwriter, producer
- Instruments: Singing, guitar, drums
- Label: Union Music Store
- Formerly of: The Jamie Freeman Agreement
- Spouse: Stevie Smith (divorced)

James Freeman (27 May 1965 – 3 December 2022) was a British singer, songwriter, musician and record producer, who previously fronted The Jamie Freeman Agreement. He was the brother of actor Martin Freeman and musician Tim Freeman, of Frazier Chorus. He co-founded Union Music Store in Lewes, East Sussex with his ex-wife, Stevie Smith. He was a member of the Americana Music Association and Americana Music Association UK. His song, "The Fire", co-written with Ben Glover, was nominated for UK Song of the Year at the UK Americana Awards.

== Career ==
Freeman's primary instrument was the guitar, and he was also a drummer. He started drumming at the age of 13 and played with the group Salter Cane for eight years. He played electric and acoustic guitar, and a kick-drum when playing solo. In the studio he also played keyboards, bass, lap steel and percussion. He played with Frazier Chorus as a member of the touring band and performed on their third album Wide Awake, released on the Pure label.

Freeman's first album Just You, released under his name, was described as "a perfect blend of UK folk/American roots" by Gilded Palace. The follow-up 100 Miles From Town was released under the band's name The Jamie Freeman Agreement and features guest appearances by several artists including Larkin Poe, Brandy Zdan, Richard Smith and The Good Lovelies. Mark Chadwick was a consultant producer on the album. David Hughes of FATEA described the album as, " set about defining English Americana."

His 2019 album Dreams About Falling features co-writes with, among others, Angaleena Presley, Brandy Zdan, and Amy Speace. Dreams About Falling's release was supported by over thirty live shows. David Pratt of FolkRadio.co.uk reviewed the album positively saying, "Jamie is patently in the vanguard of the current crop of British songwriters, regardless of genre-type. Dreams About Falling is a musical tour de force."

In 2019, Freeman attended the House of Songs Songwriter Summit in Bentonville, Arkansas, writing with Elles Bailey.

== Death ==
Freeman died from brain cancer on 3 December 2022. He was 57 years old.

== Discography ==
Artist name	Title	Year	Label	Format	Catalogue No.
Jamie Freeman	Just You	2011	Union Music Store	CD/Digital	UMS001
The Jamie Freeman Agreement	100 Miles From Town	2013	Union Music Store	CD/Digital	UMS005
Jamie Freeman	Hasia Dreams	2017	Union Music Store	CD/Digital	UMS013
Jamie Freeman	Dreams About Falling	2019	Union Music Store	CD/Vinyl/Digital	UMS014
Jamie Freeman	Isolated Incidents	2021	Self Released	CD/Digital/Zine	JMF001

=== Production credits ===
Artist	Title	Description	Year	Label
Jamie Freeman	Just You	Album	2011	Union Music Store
Zoe Brownrigg	Not Once Did I See Your Face	EP	2011	Union Music Store
The Self Help Group	Not Waving, But Drowning	Album	2012	Union Music Store
The Jamie Freeman Agreement	100 Miles From Town	Album	2013	Union Music Store
Police Dog Hogan	Home (Remix)	Remix track for the Moutarde! vinyl EP (produced by Al Scott)	2015	Union Music Store
Mark Chadwick	No Change	Track from Land of Hope and Fury compilation	2015	Union Music Store
Lucy Ward	Bigger Than That	Track from Land of Hope and Fury compilation	2015	Union Music Store
Phil Jones	New Homes	Track from Land of Hope and Fury compilation	2015	Union Music Store
The Jamie Freeman Agreement	Homes For Heroes	Track from Land of Hope and Fury compilation	2015	Union Music Store
The Self Help Group	Funeral Drum	Track from Land of Hope and Fury compilation	2015	Union Music Store
Emily Barker	Doing The Best I Can	Mix, track from Land of Hope and Fury compilation (Produced by Emily Barker)	2015	Union Music Store
The Self Help Group	Dead Stars	Album	2015	Union Music Store
Noble Jacks	What The Hammer	Album	2017	Union Music Store
Jamie Freeman	Hasia Dreams	5 song EP. Track 3 produced by Rebecca Lovell (Larkin Poe).	2017	Union Music Store
Ben Norris	Moral Vacuum	Album	2020	n/a
Jamie Freeman	Isolated Incidents	4 song EP.	2021	Self released

== Production reviews ==
=== The Self Help Group (Not Waving, But Drowning and Dead Stars) ===
"The actual sound is a huge tribute to producer Jamie Freeman, giving great depth and openness to the recording but never overdoing the instrumentation, imbuing the whole disc with a power and drive that really shouldn't be possible when taking into account the mellowness of the music. – American Roots UK

"Dead Stars is the bands second studio outing, impeccably produced by Jamie Freeman" – Brighton's Finest

"Working with the same producer as the on the first album, the album is again a small masterpiece" – FATEA

=== The Jamie Freeman Agreement (100 Miles From Town) ===
"It is high quality, beautifully written, arranged, sung, played and produced music that keeps the listener in thrall... and when it comes to the production there is a lovely clear open spacey feel even on songs with a fuller instrumentation. He seems to have an instinctive 'knack' for getting everything perfectly in balance and co-ordinated, and yet there is always a strong dramatic edginess to the performances and sound." – American Roots UK
