= Stupid! =

British television comedy show

- Genre: Comedy; Children's
- Created by: Dean Wilkinson
- Written by: Dean Wilkinson; Ben Ward; Lucy Clarke; Richard Preddy; Gary Howe; Trevor Neil; Simon Hickson
- Directed by: Jason Garbett; Dermot Canterbury
- Starring: Marcus Brigstocke; Phil Cornwell; Rusty Goffe; Tony Bignell; Miranda Hart; Travis Yates
- Theme music composer: Richie Webb; Matt Katz
- Country of origin: United Kingdom
- Original language: English
- No. of seasons: 2
- No. of episodes: 20

Production
- Executive producer: Sue Morgan
- Producer: Adam Bromley
- Editor: Michael Holliday
- Running time: 22 minutes

Original release
- Network: CBBC; BBC One
- Release: 13 May 2004 – 18 July 2007

Related
- Driving Me Mad

Stupid! is a British television comedy sketch show aimed at children of primary and secondary school age.

== Main characters ==
King Stupid (played in Series 1 by Marcus Brigstocke, and Series 2 by Phil Cornwell) is an immortal who is the instigator of all stupidity in the universe. King Stupid has files on every human and can make them behave stupidly using an advanced computer system. He resides inside his castle in the Etherworld, a pan-dimensional realm with Deed Monarchs who rule over different aspects of human behaviour, with his butler, Goober (Rusty Goffe).

Recurring characters include Jas (played by Stephanie Wookey), Jeff the Chef (Jimmy Akingbola), Scout Leader (Dominic Coleman), Dinner Lady (Miranda Hart), and the ice cream man (James Bachman).

== Episodes ==
=== Series 1 (2004) ===
No.	Title	Original release date	Prod. code
1	"This is Us"	13 May 2004	1.1
The King of Stupidity is causing Karen Jackson to scream when her hair is cut. Only his annoying butler – who needs to do the cleaning – can stop him.
2	"Human Food"	20 May 2004	1.2
King Stupid revolts against Goober's revolting cooking and forces him to go shopping in the human world. Unfortunately for him his tail will catch fire if he's spotted by a human.
3	"Love Stupidly"	27 May 2004	1.3
King Stupid falls in love with Goober's sister Milligrub. This means Goober must continue the King's stupid work, and so bin men get their own fan club, a mum won't stop knitting and the hungry waitress can't leave customers' food alone.
4	"Poorly Goober"	3 June 2004	1.4
Goober's illness is explained in the gremlin manual – it's pregnancy. King Stupid is excited about being an uncle, until he finds out what causes the purple eggs.
5	"Goober's Bath"	10 June 2004	1.5
It's Goober's first bath for 500 years, and he's doing his best to escape it. The king's malicious projects this week include a football manager with a turnip for a brain and a girl who can't stop herself asking stupid questions.
6	"The Invisible Pet Dragon"	17 June 2004	1.6
King Stupid and Goober scare each other silly with invisible monsters. The King also finds time to send a supply nuisance to annoy a class of children.
7	"Holiday"	24 June 2004	1.7
King Stupid refuses to give Goober a holiday, so is accused of being a gremlinist. A representative of the gremlin union arrives to investigate Stupid's attitudes. The King's victims this week include Archie Ologist, the very odd Wailing Walls and Frank Boffin, a child inventor who only dreams up rubbish.
8	"Queen Sensible"	1 July 2004	1.8
King Stupid is forced to share his castle with Queen Sensible, and perhaps unsurprisingly they don't get on well. Stupid and Goober must eject her from the castle or be subjected to lists, mineral water and improving walks.
9	"The Anniversary"	7 July 2004	1.9
It is anniversary time for King and Goober, and Goober's one-thousand-year contract has expired. How can Stupid persuade him to sign up again? Stupid's victims this week are Piggy Back Penny, a poor, deluded goth and a practical joking granny.
10	"Fiends Reunited"	14 July 2004	1.10
Goober has been boasting on a website by claiming he's rich and famous. Stupid decides to take revenge by arranging a reunion with Goober's old school chums. He also stitches up a devious car salesman and a garden make over guru.

=== Series 2 (2006–07) ===
No.	Title	Original release date	Prod. code
11	"Virtual Stupidity"	17 May 2006	2.1
King Stupid and Goober update the software on the stupidity-controlling console and discover it has two new components, Dead Leg X-L Rater and Virtual Stupidity. They can't resist playing tricks on humans and each other.
12	"Wonderful to See (The Back of) You"	24 May 2006	2.2
King Wonderful comes to visit. He quickly outstays his welcome, and Goober and King Stupid hatch a plan to get rid of him.
13	"We've Got a Boggart!"	31 May 2006	3AJN02
King Stupid and Goober discover they have a mischievous spirit – a boggart – in the castle. The boggart plays practical jokes on them and they try different ways to get rid of it. Despite being hounded and haunted, King Stupid still finds time to create stupidity down in the human world. Today his victims include Terry who makes very bad decisions, a boy who thinks he is a football manager and a mother who wants to be just like her teenage daughter.
14	"Rory Grue"	7 June 2007	3AJN03
Goober enters the Ether World Cookery Competition and submits his home-made Rory Grue, a gremlin delicacy. King Stupid is dismissive of Goober's cooking until he sneaks a taste and is instantly hooked.
15	"A Picture of King Stupid"	13 June 2007	3AJN04
Goober researches his family history and finds a portrait of King Stupid, which he sends to an ancestry website on the King's behalf. The website reveals Stupid's darkest secret – that he is half-human.
16	"Count Cruel Calls"	20 June 2007	3AJN05
The King's identical twin, Count Cruel, comes to stay. Cruel manages to get King Stupid out of the castle so he can use the stupidity console to wreak cruelty on Earth.
17	"Chupacabra"	27 June 2007	3AJN07
King Stupid can't stand Bargest the dog's incessant howling, so orders Goober to swap him for a nice, cute pet. Goober is tricked by the pet shop owner and brings back a vicious, wild, mythical creature called a Chupucabra. Goober tries to train the Chupucabra but it escapes and they are both in fear of being eaten alive.
18	"Gremlin Swap"	4 July 2007	3AJN12
Goober is taking part in a Gremlin Swap programme, and goes to stay with another Deed Monarch. Goober's temporary replacement is Nosey, gremlin butler to Queen Curious, who drives King Stupid mad with his endless questions. Stupid soon tires of this non-stop nosiness and knows the only way to get Goober to return is by tricking him.
19	"Fame on You"	11 July 2007	3AJN06
King Stupid goes in search of fame – he tries to write a novel, become an actor and even record a song. It turns out that fame isn't all it's cracked up to be.
20	"Judith"	18 July 2007	3AJN08
King Stupid and Goober are worried. Judith Bibble, a young reporter from the human television show Newsround, has worked out they exist. If they are exposed, they'll be banished from the Ether World.
