= Sunnyside Farm =

- Genre: Sitcom
- Written by: Richard Preddy; Gary Howe
- Directed by: Andy de Emmony
- Starring: Phil Daniels; Mark Addy
- Theme music composer: Damon Albarn; Phil Daniels
- Country of origin: United Kingdom
- Original language: English
- No. of series: 1
- No. of episodes: 6

Production
- Executive producer: Justin Judd
- Producer: Spencer Campbell
- Running time: 30 minutes
- Production company: Granada Productions

Original release
- Network: BBC Two
- Release: 18 April – 23 May 1997

Sunnyside Farm is the title of a 1997 BBC comedy television series. The series follows brothers Ray and Ken Sunnyside who have inherited the failing Sunnyside Farm. Ray, played by Phil Daniels, is a truly repulsive individual, and intends to get his brother committed to a mental institution so he can sell the farm and blow the proceeds on the high life; Ken (Mark Addy), while not the sharpest pencil in the box at least has a few redeeming characteristics. Other notable actors to appear in the series were Matt Lucas and Michael Kitchen. The show's theme music was written and performed by Damon Albarn and Phil Daniels although it was credited to Albarn's band Blur. The series was produced by Granada Productions and was initially broadcast on BBC Two.

== Cast and characters ==
- Phil Daniels as Ray Sunnyside
- Mark Addy as Ken Sunnyside
- Beth Goddard as Wendy
- Tony Gardner as Justin
- Michael Kitchen as Letchworth
- Matt Lucas as Mr Mills

== Episodes ==
No.	Episode	Directed by	Written by	Original release date
1	"Dracula and a Woman"	Andy de Emmony	Richard Preddy & Gary Howe	18 April 1997
2	"A Rare Visitor"	Andy de Emmony	Richard Preddy & Gary Howe	25 April 1997
3	"Home and Away with the Neighbours"	Andy de Emmony	Richard Preddy & Gary Howe	2 May 1997
4	"God Has Smiled Down on Me"	Andy de Emmony	Richard Preddy & Gary Howe	9 May 1997
5	"The Madness"	Andy de Emmony	Richard Preddy & Gary Howe	16 May 1997
6	"He Is Heavy, He's My Brother"	Andy de Emmony	Richard Preddy & Gary Howe	23 May 1997

== Reception ==
Receiving mixed critical notices, it was not renewed after the first series of 6 episodes.
