= Sue (album) =

Studio album by Frazier Chorus
- Released: 1989
- Studios: The Music Station, London; RG Jones, London; Audio One (London); The Townhouse, London; The Strong Room, London
- Genre: Alternative pop
- Length: 40:11
- Label: Virgin
- Producers: Hugh Jones, Bob Kraushaar, Frazier Chorus

Frazier Chorus chronology
Sue (1989)	Ray (1991)

Singles from Sue
- 1. "Dream Kitchen" Released: 1988; 2. "Typical!" Released: 1989; 3. "Sloppy Heart" Released: 1989

Professional ratings
Review scores
Source	Rating
AllMusic	4.5/5 stars

Sue is the debut album by English pop group Frazier Chorus, released in 1989 by Virgin Records.

The CD version of the album included an extra track, "Little Chef". In 2008, the album was reissued with bonus tracks by Cherry Red Records.

== Track listing ==
All tracks are written by Tim Freeman, except where noted.

No.	Title	Length
1.	"Dream Kitchen"	3:53
2.	"Storm"	3:13
3.	"Forty Winks"	3:21
4.	"Ha-Ha-Happiness"	3:24
5.	"Sloppy Heart"	5:59
6.	"Living Room"	3:40
7.	"Sugar High"	4:15
8.	"Forgetful"	4:20
9.	"Typical"	2:53
10.	"Ski-Head"	5:11
11.	"Little Chef" (CD-only bonus track)	3:52
Total length:		44:03

=== 2008 Cherry Red CD bonus tracks ===
No.	Title	Writer(s)	Length
12.	"Anarchy in the U.K."	Paul Cook, Steve Jones, Glen Matlock, Johnny Rotten	3:40
13.	"String"		3:31
14.	"Born with a Headache"		3:22
15.	"Down"		3:47
16.	"Spoonhead"		1:43
17.	"Dream Kitchen (Extended Mix)"		4:24
18.	"Typical (Extended Mix)"		4:40
19.	"Forty Winks (Extended Mix)"		4:25
Total length:			73:40

== Personnel ==
Frazier Chorus

- Tim Freeman – lead vocals, keyboards
- Chris Taplin – clarinet, programming
- Kate Holmes – flute
- Michéle Allardyce – percussion

Additional musicians

- Tim Sanders – tenor saxophone (track 3, 7)
- Roddy Lorimer – trumpet (track 3), flugelhorn (track 3, 7), trumpet solo (7)
- Simon Clarke – alto saxophone (track 3), baritone saxophone (track 3, 7), piccolo saxophone (track 7)
- Kate St John – oboe (track 5)
- "Huge" Jones – "additional oohs and aahs" (track 5)
- Paul Sirett – guitar (tracks 7, 9)
- David Olney – double bass (track 11)
- The Kick Horns – brass
- Martyn Phillips – programming

Technical

- Hugh Jones – producer, engineer (tracks 1–3, 5–10)
- Cenzo Townsend – assistant engineer
- Jerry Kitchingham – engineer
- Mark Freegard – engineer
- The Douglas Brothers – photography
- Bill Smith Studio – design
- David Bedford – string arrangements, conductor (tracks 3, 5–7)
- The Kick Horns – brass arrangements
- Bob Kraushaar – co-producer, engineer (tracks 4, 11)
- Frazier Chorus – co-producer (tracks 4, 11)

== Chart performance ==
Chart	Peak position
UK Albums Chart	56
