= Under the Shadow =

- US theatrical release poster
- زیر سایه ميدرى ها
- Directed by: Babak Anvari
- Written by: Babak Anvari
- Produced by: Emily Leo; Oliver Roskill; Lucan Toh
- Starring: Narges Rashidi; Avin Manshadi; Bobby Naderi; Ray Haratian; Arash Marandi
- Cinematography: Kit Fraser
- Edited by: Christopher Barwell
- Music by: Gavin Cullen; Will McGillivray
- Production company: Wigwam Films
- Distributed by: XYZ Films; Vertical Entertainment
- Release dates: 23 January 2016 (Sundance); 30 September 2016 (United Kingdom)
- Running time: 84 minutes
- Countries: United Kingdom; Jordan; Qatar
- Language: Persian
- Box office: $126,642

Under the Shadow (Persian: زیر سایه, romanized: Zeer-e sāye) is a 2016 Persian-language supernatural horror film written and directed by Iranian-born Babak Anvari in his directorial debut. A mother and daughter are haunted by a mysterious evil in 1980s Tehran, during the War of the Cities. The film stars Narges Rashidi, Avin Manshadi, Bobby Naderi, Ray Haratian, and Arash Marandi.

Produced by British film company Wigwam Films, the film is an international co-production between Qatar, Jordan, and the United Kingdom. The film premiered at the 2016 Sundance Film Festival and has been acquired by US streaming service Netflix. It was selected as the British entry for the Best Foreign Language Film at the 89th Academy Awards but it was not nominated.

== Plot ==
In 1980s war-torn post-revolutionary Tehran, medical student Shideh is barred from resuming her studies because of her involvement with leftist groups. She gets rid of her medical textbooks, but keeps a book of medical physiology given to her by her deceased mother. As the war intensifies, she elects to stay in the city with her daughter, Dorsa, despite the protests of her husband Iraj, who is called into military service. Iraj wants Shideh to stay with his parents in a safer part of the country, but she refuses. Iraj promises Dorsa that her favorite doll, Kimia, will protect her.

A boy moves in with the neighboring Ebrahimi family, who are his cousins; his parents were killed in an attack. During a shelling, he whispers something into Dorsa's ear and hands her a charm to ward off evil spirits. Dorsa tells her mother that the boy talked about the legend of the Djinn. She visits Mrs. Ebrahimi, who reveals that the boy has been mute since the death of his parents.

A missile strikes their building and Kimia goes missing in the commotion. Dorsa's behavior becomes more disturbed; she insists there is a strange presence in the house, and tries to get into the upper floor, believing that Kimia is there. The neighbors begin to leave to escape the fighting. Mrs. Ebrahimi warns Shideh that djinns can possess humans, and will steal a beloved personal item of their victims. The Ebrahimis leave too and Dorsa and Shideh are the only two inhabitants left in the building. Shideh's nightmares escalate to visions involving a chador that moves like a ghost. Shideh finally wants to leave but Dorsa refuses until Kimia is found. Shideh finds a mutilated Kimia, which upsets Dorsa, so she repairs Kimia with tape. When they are about to leave though, another air raid siren goes off.

While going down to the shelter, she hears Dorsa's screams. She panics, believing that the Dorsa she left with is an apparition, and returns home to find the real one. She sees Dorsa under their bed but discovers that it is an apparition. Escaping to the shelter, she finds the real Dorsa. The two are attacked by the chador apparition and escape to the car. Shideh drives them to Iraj's parents. However, it is revealed that Kimia's detached head was left behind and Shideh's medical textbook is still in the djinn's possession, implying they may still be harassed.

== Cast ==
- Narges Rashidi as Shideh
- Avin Manshadi as Dorsa
- Bobby Naderi as Iraj
- Ray Haratian as Mr. Ebrahimi
- Arash Marandi as Dr. Reza
- Bijan Daneshmand as Director
- Aram Ghasemy as Mrs. Ebrahimi
- Saussan Farrokhnia as Mrs. Fakur
- Behi Djanati Atai as Pargol
- Hamidreza Djavdan as Mr. Fakur
- Nabil Koni as Mr. Bijari
- Karam Rashayda as Mehdi
- Zainab Zamamiri as Sogand
- Khaled Zamamiri as Ali
- Adel Darageh as pot-bellied man
- Jalal Izzat as Glazier
- Suhaila Armani as female prison guard
- Amir Hossein Ranjbar as young soldier
- Houshang Ranjbar as senior police officer

Also in the cast are Ehab Rousan and Rami Mehyar as revolutionary guards, Ahmad Mehyar and Abu Rashed as paramedics and Zeid Jad and Motasem Younis as fire-fighters.

== Release ==
The film's global premiere was in January 2016 at the Sundance Film Festival. The rights to the film were subsequently acquired by streaming service Netflix; Vertical Entertainment and XYZ Films assisted in VOD releases and a limited theatrical showing starting on 7 October 2016 in the United States.

== Critical reception ==
Review aggregator website Rotten Tomatoes reports an approval rating of 99% based on 92 reviews, with an average rating of 8/10. The site's critics' consensus reads: "Under the Shadow deftly blends seemingly disparate genres to deliver an effective chiller with timely themes and thought-provoking social subtext." On Metacritic, the film has an aggregated score of 83/100 based on 20 critic reviews, indicating "universal acclaim".

Eric Kohn, writing for IndieWire, said: "Jump scares and a frantic parent shielding her child from ominous supernatural forces: These tropes are hardly new to the horror genre, but they receive a fresh spin in 'Under the Shadow'". He noted some similarities between the film and two other horror films, A Girl Walks Home Alone at Night and The Babadook, and concluded that the film "smartly observes the emotions stirred up by a world defined by restrictions, and the terrifying possibility that they might be inescapable." Kevin Maher of The Times gave the film 3/5 stars, describing it as "an eerie, often unsettling, Iranian feminist horror film set in Tehran in 1988, at the height of the Iran-Iraq War."

David Rooney, writing for The Hollywood Reporter, described the film as "a gripping thriller about a mother and daughter under supernatural siege, which also doubles as a potent allegory for the insidious and very real anxieties of war, political turmoil and a society that oppresses women." He concluded: "Anvari deftly builds and sustains tension throughout, crafting a horror movie that respects genre conventions (right down to the safe/not safe ending), while firmly establishing its own distinctive identity."

In December 2016, film critic Mark Kermode named Under the Shadow his favorite film of 2016.

On 9 July 2016, the film received the H.R. Giger Narcisse prize for the Best Movie at the Neuchâtel International Fantastic Film Festival.

== Stage adaptation ==
The film was adapted into a play by Carmen Nasr, premiering at the Almeida Theatre, London, in June 2026.

== See also ==
- List of submissions to the 89th Academy Awards for Best Foreign Language Film
- List of British submissions for the Academy Award for Best Foreign Language Film
