= House of Rock =

Satirical animated series

House of Rock is a satirical animation that aired on the UK's Channel 4 from 2000 to 2002. It is an adult animated anthology special. It revolved around the afterlives of some of the world's most famous dead rock stars, including Freddie Mercury, John Denver, The Notorious B.I.G., Kurt Cobain and Marc Bolan. Bolan was replaced in the second series by John Lennon. Forced to share a house in limbo, they try to cope with isolation, clashing personalities and relentless boredom.

The show aired as part of Channel 4's late-night 4 Music. Often, segments of the episode would appear as links between videos, reminiscent of Beavis and Butt-Head. On average, each episode from the first series was 5 minutes long, while each episode from the second series was 10 minutes long.

The characters occupy a large rundown house in a depressing landscape with nothing nearby. The character frustrations originate with their surroundings, associates and inability to do anything because they died. It is a scary comedy with the characters discussing their individual dilemmas.

== Characters ==
=== Freddie Mercury ===
Extremely theatrical and flamboyant, Freddie is highly strung and quick to anger. He openly despises all of his housemates, especially the Notorious B.I.G. He keeps a cat called Galileo.

=== John Denver ===
The group's only optimist, John is sweet and naïve, convinced there is some hope of emerging from limbo. As such he is constantly abused and berated by other more cynical housemates. His love of peace has led him to severely suppress his anger. John can often be heard using phrases used in Scooby-Doo, such as "jinkies!"

=== Kurt Cobain ===
Paranoid and depressed, Kurt is so tired of life he owns a pad of pre-printed suicide notes that he can stick anywhere like Post-it notes. Nevertheless, he is quite friendly, especially with Biggie and John. Kurt's dream is to be series champion on the UK gameshow Fifteen to One.

=== The Notorious B.I.G. ===
Known as "Biggie" within the house, Notorious is especially depressed with limbo, since he has had to leave all the trappings of his hip-hop lifestyle behind. Sometimes his sexual frustration is so great he has to take it out on the house's postman, a constantly shuddering Sid Vicious. He cannot stand Freddie Mercury, and would have shot him long ago if his gun was capable of doing anything.

=== Marc Bolan ===
The house's resident hippie, elfin Marc is only capable of talking in twee rhyming couplets in the style of his lyrics. Frustrated with his hippie sensibilities and feyness, when Satan Davina McCall demands one of their number join her in hell Big Brother style, the group agree on Marc. They are then horrified to discover his replacement is the peace-and-love obsessed John Lennon.

=== John Lennon ===
John, pompous and pretentious, with a droning Scouse voice. He comes with his own Yellow Submarine, which he wears around his waist at all times.

== Cast ==
- Richard Preddy - (voices - Marc Bolan & others)
- Gary Howe - (voices - John Denver, John Lennon & others)
- Gavin Claxton - (voices - Freddie Mercury, Kurt Cobain & others)
- Cavin Cornwall - (voices - The Notorious B.I.G.)
- Morwenna Banks (voices)

== Crew ==
- Richard Preddy - Writer
- Gary Howe - Writer
- Gavin Claxton - Writer
- Stuart Evans - Animation Director
- Gavin Claxton - Producer
