= The Eichmann Show =

2015 British BBC TV drama film

- Written by: Simon Block
- Directed by: Paul Andrew Williams
- Starring: Martin Freeman; Anthony LaPaglia; Rebecca Front
- Narrated by: Samuel West
- Music by: Laura Rossi
- Country of origin: United Kingdom
- Original language: English

Production
- Producers: Laurence Bowen; Ken Marshall
- Cinematography: Carlos Catalan
- Editor: James Taylor
- Running time: 90 minutes
- Production company: Feelgood

Original release
- Network: BBC Two
- Release: 20 January 2015

The Eichmann Show is a 2015 British BBC TV drama film produced by Laurence Bowen and Ken Marshall and directed by Paul Andrew Williams.

It is based on the true story of how American TV producer Milton Fruchtman and blacklisted TV director Leo Hurwitz came to broadcast the trial of one of World War II's most notorious Nazis, Adolf Eichmann, in 1961.

== Plot ==
In 1961, former Nazi Adolf Eichmann is captured by Israeli agents and put on trial. American television producer Milton Fruchtman fervently believes that the trial, with its witness accounts of Nazi atrocities, should be televised to show the world the evils of the Holocaust, and to combat any resurgence of Nazism, and joins forces with blacklisted director Leo Hurwitz. Despite death threats, reluctance to cooperate from several networks, and even resistance from the Israeli prime minister, David Ben-Gurion, who fears a 'show trial', the pair persist and move their cameras into the courtroom. Edited daily and shown in some three dozen countries, the 'Eichmann Show' becomes the first ever global television documentary.

== Cast ==
- Martin Freeman as Milton Fruchtman
- Anthony LaPaglia as Leo Hurwitz
- Rebecca Front as Mrs Landau
- Andy Nyman as David Landor
- Nicholas Woodeson as Yaakov Jonilowicz
- Ben Addis as Ron Huntsman
- Caroline Bartleet as Judy Gold
- Ed Birch as Millek Knebel
- Zora Bishop as Eva Fruchtman
- Dylan Edwards as Roy Sedwell
- Nathaniel Gleed as Tommy Hurwitz
- Ben Lloyd-Hughes as Alan Rosenthal
- Vaidotas Martinaitis as Adolf Eichmann
- Nell Mooney as New York Times Journalist's Wife
- Solomon Mousley as Perry
- Anna-Louise Plowman as Jane Hurwitz
- Ian Porter as New York Times Journalist
- Justin Salinger as David Arad
- Samuel West as Narrator

== Postscript ==
The film postscript reads: "After adjourning on the 14th August, the judges declared Eichmann responsible for the terrible conditions on board the trains to Auschwitz, and for obtaining Jews to fill those trains. Eichmann was also found guilty of crimes against humanity, war crimes and crimes against Poles, Slovenes and Gypsies. Adolf Eichmann was hanged on the 31 May 1962. His ashes were cast into the sea. The daily films produced and directed by Milton Fruchtman and Leo Hurwitz constitute the world's first ever global television documentary series. It was the first time the horror of the Nazi death camps had been heard on television, from the mouths of 112 eye witnesses and survivors. For his work on the Eichmann trial, Milton Fruchtman won a Peabody Award together with Capital Cities Broadcasting Corporation, and he went on to have a successful career in American television. Leo Hurwitz continued to make documentary films. He went on to become Professor of Film and Chairman of the Graduate Institute of Film and Television at New York University."
