= Frazier Chorus =

English pop band

Background information
- Origin: Brighton, England
- Genres: Pop, dream pop
- Years active: 1986–1996
- Labels: 4AD; Virgin; Pinkerton
- Past members: Tim Freeman; Kate Holmes; Chris Taplin; Michéle Allardyce
- Website: http://frazierchorus.co.uk

Frazier Chorus were an English pop group from Brighton, England. They were known for their unconventional instrumentation, including synthesizers, trumpets, flutes and clarinets, as well as frontman Tim Freeman's "soft, heavily accented ... talk-singing" and sarcastically witty lyrics.

== History ==
Frazier Chorus was formed in Brighton, England, by Tim Freeman (the brother of actor Martin Freeman and musician Jamie Freeman, on vocals and keyboards), Michéle Allardyce (percussion), Kate Holmes (flute) and Chris Taplin (clarinet, programming). Original names for the band included both Fishing For Clouds and Plop!, but the band eventually settled on Frazier Chorus, a phrase they had seen on a jacket for the Frazier College football team's cheerleaders in the United States.

The band first signed to British indie record label 4AD and released the single "Sloppy Heart" in 1987. Shortly afterwards, they moved to Virgin Records and achieved three minor chart hits with melodic pop songs taken from their 1989 debut album, Sue. Allardyce was eventually dismissed from the band.

Their second album, Ray, followed in 1991, and its singles were remixed by a number of top remixers, including Paul Oakenfold, Chad Jackson and Youth. Following the album's release, the band was let go from Virgin after the label was purchased by EMI and began purging a number of its artists; subsequently, Holmes and Taplin fired Freeman before ultimately disbanding entirely. Holmes later moved into electronica via the bands Sirenes, Technique, and Client.

Freeman took several years off and re-emerged in the mid-1990s, resurrecting the band name with permission from Holmes and Taplin. In 1995, Freeman released a mini-album as Frazier Chorus, Wide Awake, which did not reach the UK Albums Chart. He later released Monkey Spunk, a collection of five demos recorded prior to the sessions for Wide Awake, available exclusively via the band's website.

After leaving the band, Holmes became a member of the synthpop band Technique, before joining Dubstar's Sarah Blackwood in the electronic band CLIEͶT in the 2000s.

== Discography ==
=== Studio albums ===
Year	Album	UK Albums Chart	Label
1989	Sue	56	Virgin
1991	Ray	66	Virgin
1995	Wide Awake	-	Pinkerton
"-" denotes releases that did not chart.

=== Singles ===
Year	Song	Peak chart positions			Album	Label
Year	Song	UK Singles Chart	US Alternative Songs	US Dance/Club Play Songs	Album	Label
1987	"Sloppy Heart"	-	-	-	Non-album release	4AD
1988	"Dream Kitchen"	57	-	-	Sue	Virgin
1989	"Typical!"	53	-	-	Sue	Virgin
1989	"Sloppy Heart"	73	-	-	Sue	Virgin
1990	"Cloud 8"	52	17	14	Ray	Virgin
1990	"Nothing"	51	-	28	Ray	Virgin
1991	"Walking on Air"	60	-	-	Ray	Virgin
1996	"Driving"	-	-	-	Wide Awake	Pure
1996	"Wide Awake"	-	-	-	Wide Awake	Seedy Singles
"-" denotes releases that did not chart or were not released in that country.

=== Compilations ===
Year	Album
1998	Monkey Spunk
