= Gavin Claxton =

British film director, producer and screenwriter (born 1966)

- Born: 19 June 1966 (age 59); Derby, England

Gavin Claxton (born 19 July 1966, in Derby, England) is a British producer, screenwriter and director of the feature film comedy The All Together starring Martin Freeman and Danny Dyer. He is also producer, co-writer and performer - providing the voices of Freddie Mercury & Kurt Cobain - of the British television comedy series House of Rock and series producer, writer & director of numerous comedy and entertainment series on British television.
