= The All Together =

- Theatrical release poster
- Directed by: Gavin Claxton
- Written by: Gavin Claxton
- Produced by: Annabel Raftery; Marion Pilowsky; Colin Leventhal
- Starring: Martin Freeman; Danny Dyer; Corey Johnson; Velibor Topic; Richard Harrington; Amanda Abbington; Jamie Kenna; David Bamber; Fenella Fielding
- Production company: Establishment Films
- Distributed by: Lionsgate
- Release date: 11 May 2007
- Running time: 85 minutes
- Country: United Kingdom
- Language: English

The All Together is a 2007 comedy film written and directed by Gavin Claxton and starring Martin Freeman, Corey Johnson, Velibor Topic and Danny Dyer.

== Plot ==
Frustrated TV producer Chris is a self-opinionated wannabe screenwriter (with a particular dislike of British films featuring quirky secondary characters and plastic gangsters) who is forced to leave his unreliable flatmate Bob in charge of showing a series of estate agents around the house he is trying to sell. Worried by Bob's habit of spending all day "working" in the basement playing loud music, Chris asks his friend to listen out for the door bell and show anyone who comes calling inside. Bob promises to do exactly that and for once, not to let him down.

Over the course of the day, whilst Chris struggles to cope with a loathsome colleague – back at the house it is soon clear that Bob is taking his promise to Chris rather too literally. Bob has indeed, allowed anyone inside, including a couple of archetypal movie-style gangsters – an incompetent young Brit played by Danny Dyer and an incontinent American.

That evening, Chris is surprised to return home and find his flatmate, four estate agents, two Jehovah's Witnesses and a terrified children's entertainer being held hostage by a couple of characters straight out of a British gangster film.

== Cast ==
Actor	Role
Martin Freeman	Chris Ashworth
Danny Dyer	Dennis Earle
Corey Johnson	Mr Gaspardi
Velibor Topic	Bob Music
Richard Harrington	Jerry Davies
Amanda Abbington	Sarah
Charles Edwards	Marcus Craigie-Halkett
Jonathan Ryland	Barney Winbow
Jamie Kenna	Keith
David Bamber	Robin Swain
Fenella Fielding	Mrs Cox
Nicholas Hutchison	Kenny Tinsel
Alexandra Gilbreath	Prue Swain

== Soundtrack ==
The film's soundtrack is made up of rare Northern soul tracks, including:

1. Tommy Neal – Going to a Happening
2. Doris Troy – I'd Do Anything
3. Johnny De'vigne – I Smell Trouble
4. Ronnie & Robyn – Sidra's Theme
5. The Channels – Anything You Do
6. Doni Burdick – Open The Door To Your Heart
7. Steve Karmen – Breakaway
8. The Sapphires – Gotta Have Your Love
9. The Yum Yums – Gonna Be A Big Thing

== Critical response ==
The All Together was panned by critics. On Rotten Tomatoes, the film has an approval rating of 0% based on 10 reviews.

== See also ==
- Northern soul
