= Gary Howe =

British comedy writer and performer

Gary Howe

Gary Howe is a British comedy writer and performer, most noted for working in the sketch show Smack the Pony and the sitcom Green Wing. He had a working partnership with fellow writer Richard Preddy from 1988 until the latter's death.

Renowned zoologist and bargain hunter Mark Cartwright once described Gary as "the funniest thing with two legs."

== Performer ==
- All Aboard the Cat Bus on Channel 4's Comedy Lab – (1999)
- House of Rock – (2000–02)
- Green Wing – (2004–06) Playing a lodger.

== Writer ==
- ChuckleVision - (1987–present)
- Birds of a Feather - (1989–98)
- Smith and Jones - (1989–98)
- Tracey Ullman: A Class Act - (1993)
- Shooting Stars - (1993–2002)
- Harry Enfield And Chums - (1994–97)
- The Fast Show - (1994–2000)
- Ant and Dec Unzipped - (1997)
- Sunnyside Farm - (1997)
- We Know Where You Live - (1997)
- The Morwenna Banks Show - (1998)
- The Zig and Zag Show - (1998)
- All Aboard the Cat Bus on Channel 4's Comedy Lab - (1999)
- Smack the Pony - (1999–2003)
- House of Rock - (2000–02)
- Tv to Go - (2000–02)
- Shooting Stars - (2001)
- Green Wing - (2004–06)
- The All Star Comedy Show, later Monkey Trousers - (2004–05)
- Man Stroke Woman - (2005–07)
- Stupid! - (2005–07)
