= Gates (TV series) =

British comedy television series

- Genre: Sitcom
- Created by: Laurence Bowen; Andrew Collins; Richard Preddy; Dan Sefton; Abigail Wilson
- Written by: Andrew Collins; Richard Preddy; Ava Vidal; Dan Sefton; Abigail Wilson
- Directed by: Laurence Bowen; Sam Cadman; Gordon Anderson
- Starring: Joanna Page; Tom Ellis; Catherine Shepherd; Sue Johnston; Tony Gardner; Nick Mohammed; Toby Wharton; Nadine Marshall; Ella Kenion; William Andrews; Marie John Bull
- Opening theme: "Upside Down" by Paloma Faith
- Composer: Jonathan Whitehead
- Country of origin: United Kingdom
- Original language: English
- No. of series: 1
- No. of episodes: 5

Production
- Running time: 30mins (inc. adverts)
- Production company: Feelgood Fiction

Original release
- Network: Sky Living
- Release: 14 August – 11 September 2012

Gates is a British comedy television series shown on Sky Living. The series of 5 episodes ran from 14 August to 11 September 2012.

== Plot ==
Helen and Mark Pearson (Joanna Page and Tom Ellis) enroll their daughter, Chloe (Mari Ann Bull), in the Parkview Primary School and hijinks ensue as they try to fit in with the other parents at the school gates whilst dropping her off and picking her up from school.

== Cast ==
- Joanna Page as Helen Pearson, an estate agent
- Tom Ellis as Mark Pearson, a builder
- Catherine Shepherd as Sarah Howells, a housewife
- Sue Johnston as Miss Hunter, Chloe’s teacher
- Tony Gardner as Aiden Howells, a workaholic dad
- Nick Mohammed as Ciaran, a male nanny
- Toby Wharton as Mickey
- Nadine Marshall as Melissa, a hairdresser
- Ella Kenion as Mia, a rep at the school
- William Andrews as Mr. Gould, the headteacher of the school
- Mari Ann Bull as Chloe Pearson, Helen and Mark’s daughter

== Episodes ==
No.	Title	Directed by	Written by	Original release date	Viewers
1	"The First Day"	Sam Cadman, Gordon Anderson	Andrew Collins, Richard Preddy, Dan Sefton, Abigail Wilson	14 August 2012	387,000
Having recently moved to south-east England, Mark and Helen Pearson's daughter Chloe is about to start at a new primary school, but it is the parents with first-day nerves!
2	"Helen Vs. Sarah"	Gordon Anderson	Andrew Collins, Richard Preddy, Dan Sefton, Abigail Wilson	21 August 2012	290,000
The moves at a 'salsacise' class have more punch than anyone expected when Sarah and Helen fall out over a playground scrap between their children, Zac and Chloe.
3	"Young Love"	Gordon Anderson	Richard Preddy, Dan Sefton	28 August 2012	296,000
Could love be blossoming at the school gates? Not if Mark has anything to do with it. The protective dad plays dirty...
4	"The Sleep Out"	Gordon Anderson	Unknown	4 September 2012	218,000
Chloe gets proactive to help the local Big Issue seller and suggests a sponsored sleep out to raise money for the homeless. Despite her admirable zeal, there's a lack of goodwill among the parents when it comes to spending a night in the elements!
5	"Parent's Evening of Doom"	Gordon Anderson	Andrew Collins, Richard Preddy, Dan Sefton, Abigail Wilson	11 September 2012	232,000
Parents' evening brings Helen a tidal wave of nerves, but she's more alarmed than relieved to learn that Chloe's a bit of a goody-two-shoes. Meanwhile, Mr Gould appears intent on talking Miss Hunter into retirement. She has no intention of leaving, but can he wear her down?

== DVD ==
Gates was released on DVD on 17 September 2012.

== International broadcast ==
In Australia, the series premiered on BBC First on 4 May 2015.
