= Wings (1988 TV series) =

Aviation history documentary TV series

Wings title card (1991)

Wings is an hour-long televised aviation history documentary television series which aired on the Discovery Channel family of networks. It was produced by Phil Osborn.

== Original program ==
Originally called Great Planes, the Wings program initially aired Wednesdays and Saturdays on the Discovery Channel in the United States from 9–10 p.m. Eastern beginning in 1988 and into the early 1990s.

=== Great Planes ===
Great Planes was the original subset of Wings episodes which focused on one particular aircraft type. The original Great Planes program was initially produced by Aviation Video International in Australia, and distributed by the Discovery Channel.

When it initially aired in America, the majority of episodes were narrated by the program's Australian writer and director, Luke Swann, with some others written and narrated by John Honey and Phil Chugg. In 1991 (notably following the first Gulf War), episodes were re-edited to include interviews with pilots of the profiled aircraft types before and following commercial breaks, and the narration was re-dubbed with American narrators Ron David and Tom Hair.

==== Episodes ====
- Boeing 707
- Boeing 747
- Boeing B-17 Flying Fortress
- Boeing B-29 Superfortress
- Boeing B-52 Stratofortress
- British Aerospace/McDonnell Douglas Harrier
- Consolidated B-24 Liberator
- Consolidated PBY Catalina
- Convair B-36 Peacemaker
- Douglas A-1 Skyraider
- Douglas A-4 Skyhawk
- Douglas A-26 Invader
- Douglas C-47 Dakota
- General Dynamics F-16 Fighting Falcon
- General Dynamics F-111 Aardvark
- Grumman F-14 Tomcat
- Grumman F4F Wildcat/F6F Hellcat
- Lockheed Constellation
- Lockheed C-130 Hercules
- Lockheed F-104 Starfighter
- Lockheed P-38 Lightning
- Lockheed SR-71 Blackbird
- Martin B-26 Marauder
- Martin B-57 Canberra
- McDonnell Douglas F-4 Phantom II
- McDonnell Douglas F-15 Eagle
- McDonnell Douglas F/A-18 Hornet
- North American B-25 Mitchell
- North American F-86 Sabre
- North American F-100 Super Sabre
- North American P-51 Mustang
- North American XB-70 Valkyrie
- Northrop F-5 Freedom Fighter
- Republic F-84 Thunderjet
- Republic F-105 Thunderchief
- Republic P-47 Thunderbolt
- Rockwell B-1 Lancer
- Vought A-7 Corsair II
- Vought F4U Corsair

Some other episodes profiled non-American aircraft, including the Aérospatiale-British Aerospace Concorde, Mitsubishi A6M Zero, Panavia Tornado, and Supermarine Spitfire.

=== Strange Planes ===
A series of thirteen episodes, entitled Strange Planes (and later released on VHS video), focused on several unusual aircraft types.

==== Episodes ====
- "Strange Shapes"
- "Parasites"
- "Vertical"
- "Giants"
- “Catapult Planes”
- ”Strangest Planes”
- “Pusher Planes”
- “Feed The Birds”
- “Rubber Planes”
- “Hovercrafts”
- ”Circles In The Sky”
- “Drones.Midgets.Mutations…”
- “Eyes In The Sky”

=== Miscellaneous programs ===
These programs were shown occasionally during the Wings time slot. They were produced from various sources.

- Air Combat Today
- Combat Aircraft of the Future
- Modern Air Combat 3
- Modern Fighters
- Modern Missiles
- Naval Combat Aircraft
- Soviet Air Power
- The MiG Story
- US Air Power

=== Wings II ===
Starting in the mid 1990s, newer Wings episodes, sometimes referred to as Wings II, would focus on the history or operations of a particular foreign air force, such as the Israeli Air Force, a foreign aviation company or design bureau such as France's Dassault or Russia's Mikoyan, or the aircraft of a particular conflict such as the Korean War or the Afghan-Soviet War. These episodes, narrated by Stuart Culpepper, often had interviews with the aircrews and famed aviation historian/writer Jeffrey Ethell, the "Fighter Writer".

==== Episodes ====
- (A-4) "Hugging the Deck"
- (A-10) "Steel Rain"
- (AH-1) "Whispering Death"
- (AH-64) "Guardians of the Night"
- (AV-8) "Harrier"
- (B-1) "Doomsday Mission"
- (B-52) "Instant Thunder"
- (F-15) "Eagles Over Lebanon"
- (F-16) "Flight of the Falcon"
- (F-105) "The Thud"
- (Mi-24) "Bear Trap"
- (Su-25) "Flying Tank"
- (U-2) "Spy Planes"
- (UH-1) "Landing Zone Vietnam"
- "Flying Coffins"
- "Red October"
- "Top Guns"
- "Wings Over Europe
  - "Wings: Target Berlin" (P-51)
  - "Wings: Dresden Firestorm" (B-17)
  - "Wings: The Valiant Few"(Spitfire)
- "Wings Over the Pacific"
- Wings Over Vietnam
  - "Wings Over Vietnam: The Cavalry"
  - "Wings Over Vietnam: The Gunships"

== Spinoff programs ==
=== Wings of the Luftwaffe ===
Wings of the Luftwaffe was a 1992 separately-branded program that focused on Luftwaffe aircraft of World War II. It was narrated by Alex Scott.

==== Episodes ====
- "The Blitz" – Arado Ar 234
- "The Butcher Bird" – Focke-Wulf Fw 190
- "The Destroyer" – Messerschmitt Bf 110
- "Gigant" – Messerschmitt Me 321/323
- "Iron Annie" – Junkers Ju 52
- "The Jet" – Messerschmitt Me 262
- "The Komet" – Messerschmitt Me 163
- "The Legend" – Messerschmitt Bf 109
- "The Schnell Bomber" – Junkers Ju 88
- "Sea Wings" – German Seaplanes
- "The Secret Bomber" – Heinkel He 111
- "The Stuka" – Junkers Ju 87
- "V for Vengeance" – V-1 flying bomb

Wings of the Luftwaffe: Fighter Attack was a one-hour 1994 post-production program which included parts of the episodes about the Focke-Wulf Fw 190, the Messerschmitt Me 262, and the Messerschmitt Bf 109. It was included in the Wings Collection set: one VHS tape of a 1998 six VHS tape collection and part of the 2003 one DVD disc version.

=== Wings of the Red Star ===
Wings of the Red Star was a separately-branded program that focused on Soviet Air Force aircraft from World War II to the modern era. It was narrated by actor Peter Ustinov.

==== Episodes ====
- "The Backfire Bomber" – Soviet supersonic bomber development, including the Tupolev Tu-22M 'Backfire' and the Tu-160 'Blackjack'
- "Duel over Korea" – Development and career of the Mikoyan-Gurevich MiG-15 'Fagot'
- "The Flying Tank" – Ilyushin Il-2 'Sturmovik'
- "The Foxbat" – Development leading up to the Mikoyan-Gurevich MiG-25 'Foxbat'
- "The Great Patriotic War" – History of the air war on the eastern front during World War II
- "The Last Generation" – Late-model Soviet fighters, including the Mikoyan-Gurevich MiG-29 'Fulcrum' and the Sukhoi Su-27 'Flanker'
- "The Nuclear Bear" – Development of long-range strategic bombers, including the Tupolev Tu-95 'Bear'
- "The Phantom's Foe" – Supersonic fighter development leading to the Mikoyan-Gurevich MiG-21 'Fishbed'
- "Russian Giants" – Giant Soviet transport aircraft leading up to the Antonov An-124 and Antonov An-225 Mriya.
- "Soviet Rotors" – Development of Soviet helicopters
- "Straight Up" – Soviet Vertical Take-off aircraft, including the Yakovlev Yak-38 'Forger' and Yak-141 'Freestyle'
- "Supersonic Transport" – Development of the Tupolev Tu-144
- "The Swing-Wing Solution" – Development leading up to the Mikoyan-Gurevich MiG-23/Mikoyan MiG-27 'Flogger'

=== SeaWings ===
SeaWings, narrated by Edward Easton, was a separately-branded program that focused on United States (and some foreign) naval aircraft from World War II to the present day, including:

- Grumman A-6 Intruder ("Thunder from the Sea")
- Grumman F9F Panther/Cougar
- Grumman F-14 Tomcat ("Defender of the Fleet")
- Grumman TBF Avenger ("The Avenger")
- Lockheed P-3 Orion ("The Hunter")
- Lockheed S-3 Viking ("The Scout")
- McDonnell Douglas F-18 Hornet ("The Killer Bee")
- North American A-5 Vigilante
- Dassault-Breguet Super Étendard ("The Falkland Surprise")
- Vought F-8 Crusader ("The Last Gunfighter")
- Air-sea rescue aircraft and operations ("Wings of Mercy")

=== Wings Over the Gulf ===
Following the Gulf War of 1991, Discovery produced a new short-run program, Wings Over the Gulf, profiling the air war over Iraq before and during Operation Desert Storm, and select aircraft types used by coalition forces. The program was narrated by Will Lyman, and was released on VHS.

==== Episodes ====
- "First Strike" – The run-up to and beginning of Operation Desert Storm (McDonnell Douglas F-15 Eagle/Lockheed F-117 Nighthawk
- "In Harm's Way" – The air war over Iraq at the height of Operation Desert Storm (Panavia Tornado/Grumman A-6 Intruder)
- "The Final Assault" – The final days of Desert Storm, including the ground war and the liberation of Kuwait (General Dynamics F-16 Fighting Falcon/Fairchild Republic A-10 Thunderbolt II)

A separate episode that aired around this time period was "Nighthawk: Secrets of the Stealth"

=== Wings Over Vietnam: The Missions ===
In 2002, this eight-episode program was aired, hosted by David Scott.

- "The FACs"
- "Dust Off"
- "Rolling Thunder"
- "The Jolly Greens"
- "Spookies, Spectres, and Shadows"
- "MiG Killers"
- "Wild Weasels"
- "Linebacker II"

== Revival ==
In 2008, Great Planes was revived in a modernized format, hosted by Paul "Max" Moga and Terry Dietz, that aired on the Military Channel in the United States.

== Legacy ==
After a lengthy run in the late 1980s and early 1990s in the Wednesday/Saturday time slot, Discovery moved Wings to every weekday from 6 to 7 p.m. Eastern, under the banner "Weekday Wings". The program ended its weekday run in the late 90s.

=== Discovery Wings channel ===
The program formed the backbone for the Discovery Wings channel in the United States and United Kingdom, which launched in 1999. Discovery Wings was rebranded into the Military Channel in 2005 and Discovery Turbo in 2007, respectively.

Some episodes are available on VHS via eBay and Amazon. "Great Planes" episodes are available on DVD in Australia through Magna Pacific.

Luke Swann died on 6 October 2000 after a brief battle with liver cancer. He is survived by his two daughters, Emily and Madeleine, and son Jack.

Producer Phil Osborn went on to found AeroCinema, an online aviation history video web site which produces and hosts documentaries similar to Wings and which are viewable online only via paid subscription.
