= Narges Rashidi =

German-Iranian actress

- Rashidi in May 2026
- Born: Narges Rashidi; 1980 (age 45–46); Khorramabad, Iran
- Occupation: Actress
- Years active: 2004–present
- Spouse: Christian Straka

Narges Rashidi (Persian: نرگس رشیدی; born 1980) is an American-German actress of Iranian descent. She is known for her starring role in the 2016 film Under the Shadow by Babak Anvari, and as British-Iranian citizen Nazanin Zaghari-Ratcliffe the 2025 BBC fact-based drama miniseries Prisoner 951.

== Early life ==
Narges Rashidi was born in 1980 in Khorramabad, Iran. Her father was an army colonel and her mother is a housewife. She lived in Tehran at the time of the Iran–Iraq War.

Rashidi moved with her family to Turkey and then Germany when she was seven. She grew up in Bad Hersfeld in Germany. She was introduced to acting by the summer theatre festivals in the town.

== Career ==
Rashidi has appeared in many independent films and television productions, starting with the experimental film Venussian Tabutasco by Daryush Shokof in 2004.

Rashidi received international recognition and widespread acclaim for her starring role in the 2016 film Under the Shadow by Babak Anvari, which premiered at the Sundance Film Festival. Variety cited her as "a favorite breakthrough performance" at Sundance. The magazine hailed her "intense yet fine-grained work... as a fiercely intelligent, progressive-minded Iranian woman infuriated by the direction of her country since the Islamic Revolution," noting, "Rashidi plays her character like a musical instrument going slowly out of tune; it's a performance rich in both motherly love and scream-queen abandon."

Rashidi plays Lale in the 2020 British TV series Gangs of London.

Rashidi was cast in the 2025 BBC fact-based drama miniseries Prisoner 951 as British-Iranian citizen Nazanin Zaghari-Ratcliffe, who was detained in Iran for six years. Joseph Fiennes played her husband, Richard Ratcliffe.

== Personal life ==
Rashidi speaks Persian, German, and English.

She married Christian Straka, a former professional tennis player. In 2016 she was living in Los Angeles.

== Filmography ==
=== Film ===
| Year | Title | Role | Notes |
|---|---|---|---|
| 2004 | Venussian Tabutasco | | |
| 2005 | Aeon Flux | Pregnant Woman | |
| 2006 | Asudem | Girl | |
| 2006 | A2Z | | |
| 2006 | Black Sheep | Leo's Girlfriend | |
| 2007 | Breathful | Fuss | |
| 2008 | Speed Racer | Persian Announcer | |
| 2009 | Meeting Laura | Narges | Short film |
| 2009 | Must Love Death | Isabel | |
| 2010 | NOS (auf dich) | Vina | Short film |
| 2011 | Dating Lanzelot | Zibaa | |
| 2011 | My Prince. My King | Fatima | |
| 2012 | Slave | Nurse | |
| 2013 | Kokowääh 2 | Verkäuferin | |
| 2015 | Von glücklichen Schafen | Elmas / mother | |
| 2016 | Under the Shadow | Shideh | |
| 2017 | Tigermilch | Noura Bashir | |
| 2019 | The Manchador | Mina | Short film |
| 2025 | Havoc | Helena Walker | |

=== Television ===
| Year | Title | Role | Notes |
|---|---|---|---|
| 2006 | Die Geschichte Mitteldeutschlands | Orientalische Frau des Grafen von Gleichen | Episode: "Ehe zu dritt - Die Frauen des Grafen von Gleichen" |
| 2007 | KDD – Kriminaldauerdienst | Nuran | Episode: "Fragen der Ehre" |
| 2008 | Schimanski | Laura | Episode: "Schicht im Schacht" |
| 2009 | Engel sucht Liebe | Ayse | TV movie |
| 2012 | Ein Fall für zwei | Ayshe | Episode: "Mord im Callcenter" |
| 2012 | Geisterfahrer | Faiza | TV movie |
| 2013 | Nachtschicht | Dalida Abdullah | Episode: "Geld regiert die Welt" |
| 2014–2015 | Löwenzahn | Banu | 4 episodes |
| 2015 | Sibel & Max | Elif | Episode: "Schief gewickelt" |
| 2015 | Too Young to Die | Dalida Medjoub | TV movie |
| 2016–2018 | Never Too Late For Justice | Samira Vaziri | 22 episodes |
| 2017 | The Girlfriend Experience | Darya Esford | 5 episodes |
| 2017 | Reich oder tot | Dalida Medjoub | TV movie |
| 2019 | Anatomy of Evil | Leila Nymann | Episode: "Sehnsucht" |
| 2019 | Hanna | Sima | 2 episodes |
| 2020–present | Gangs of London | Lale | 20 episodes |
| 2025 | Prisoner 951 | Nazanin Zaghari-Ratcliffe | BBC One miniseries |

== Awards ==
| Year | Award | Category | Nominated work | Result | Ref. |
|---|---|---|---|---|---|
| 2007 | New York Independent International Film & Video Festival | Best Breakthrough Actress | A2Z | Won | |
| 2026 | Royal Television Society Programme Awards | Best Actress | Prisoner 951 | Won | |
| 2026 | British Academy Television Awards | Best Actress | Prisoner 951 | Won | |
