= Martin Freeman =

English actor (born 1971)

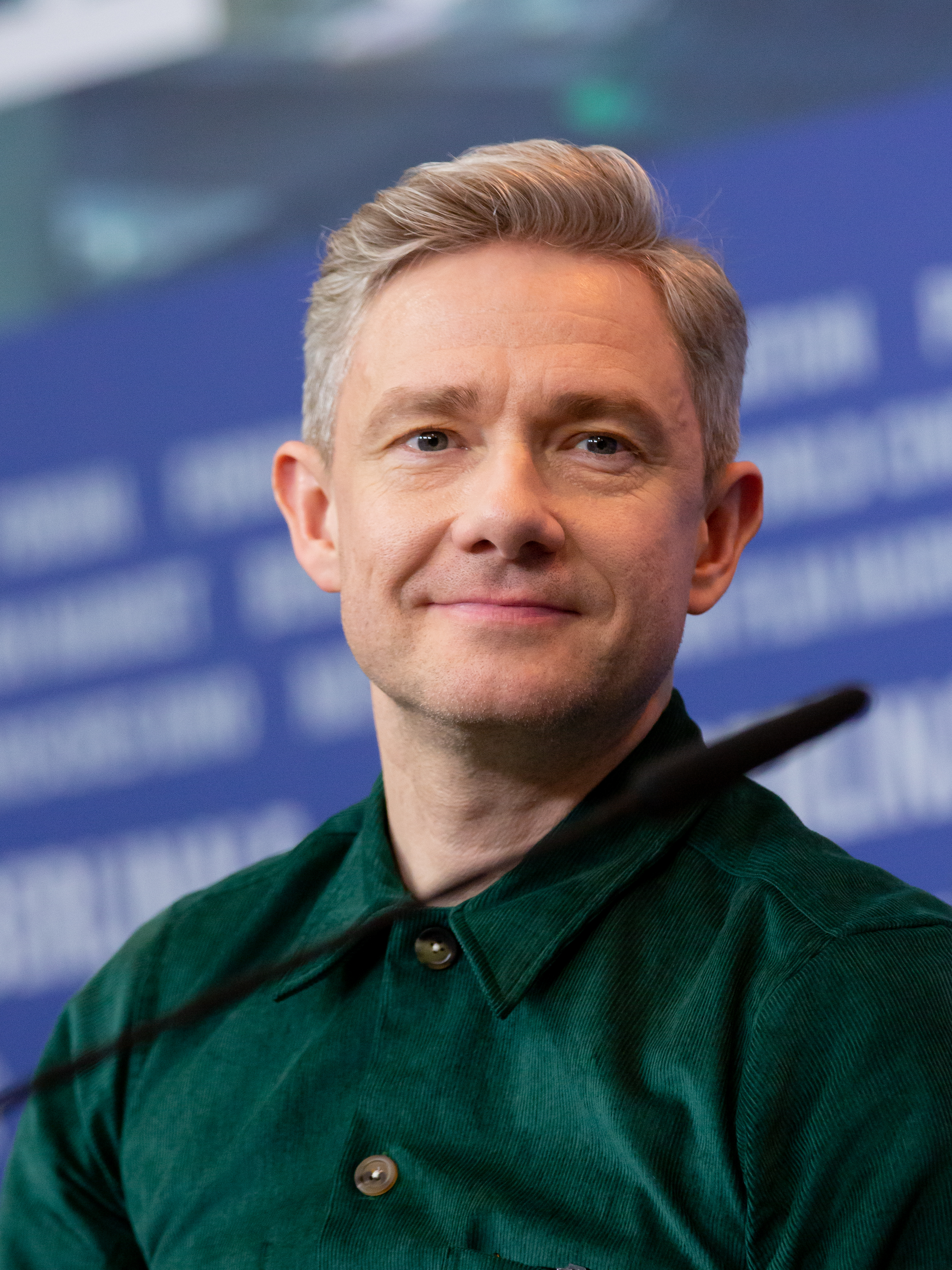
- Freeman in 2019
- Born: Martin John Christopher Freeman; 8 September 1971 (age 55); Aldershot, Hampshire, England
- Education: Royal Central School of Speech and Drama
- Occupation: Actor
- Years active: 1997–present
- Spouse: Rachel Benaissa (m. 2026)
- Partner: Amanda Abbington (2000–2016)
- Children: 2

Martin John Christopher Freeman (born 8 September 1971) is an English actor. Known for his performances on stage and screen, he has received various accolades, including two Emmy Awards, and a British Academy Television Award, as well as nominations for a Golden Globe Award and a Critics' Choice Television Award.

Freeman's most notable roles are that of Tim Canterbury in the mockumentary series The Office (2001–2003), Dr. John Watson in the British crime drama series Sherlock (2010–2017), young Bilbo Baggins in The Hobbit film trilogy (2012–2014), Lester Nygaard in the first season of the dark comedy-crime drama series Fargo (2014), and Chris Carson in The Responder (2022–2024).

He has also appeared in films including the romantic comedy Love Actually (2003), the horror comedy Shaun of the Dead (2004), the sci-fi comedy The Hitchhiker's Guide to the Galaxy (2005), the action comedy Hot Fuzz (2007), the semi-improvised comedy Nativity! (2009), and the sci-fi comedy The World's End (2013). Since 2016, he has portrayed Everett K. Ross in the Marvel Cinematic Universe, appearing in the films Captain America: Civil War (2016), Black Panther (2018), and Black Panther: Wakanda Forever (2022), and the Disney+ series Secret Invasion (2023).

== Early life and education ==
Martin John Christopher Freeman was born on 8 September 1971 in Aldershot, Hampshire, the youngest of five children. His parents, Philomena (née Norris) and naval officer Geoffrey Freeman, separated when he was a child. His father died of a heart attack when Freeman was 10 years old.

Freeman's paternal grandfather, Leonard W. Freeman, was a medic in the British Expeditionary Force during World War II and was killed in action at Dunkirk just a few days before the Dunkirk evacuation. Leonard's father, Richard, was born blind and worked as a piano tuner and organist.

Freeman was raised in his mother's Catholic faith, and attended the Salesian School in Chertsey, Surrey, before attending Brooklands College in nearby Weybridge for media studies. His older brother, Tim, became a singer with the group Frazier Chorus.

== Career ==
Freeman attended the Central School of Speech and Drama and has appeared in at least 18 TV shows, 14 theatre productions, and several radio productions. He became notable for his role as Tim Canterbury in The Office (2001–2003), a role which, he said in 2004, "cast a very long shadow" for him as an actor. He appeared in the sitcom Hardware (2003–2004). He also appeared in several films, including Ali G Indahouse (2002) and Love Actually (2003).

He began to move into more serious dramatic roles on television with his appearance as Lord Shaftesbury in the 2003 BBC historical drama Charles II: The Power and The Passion. He made a brief appearance in the first episode of the second series of This Life. He starred in the BBC television series The Robinsons, and had a cameo in Episode 1 of Black Books. In 2007, he appeared in The All Together written and directed by Gavin Claxton, and in the Bill Kenwright theatre production of The Last Laugh. He is featured in the video for Faith No More's cover of "I Started a Joke". In May 2009, he starred in Boy Meets Girl, a four-part drama that charts the progress of characters Veronica and Danny after an accident which causes them to swap bodies.

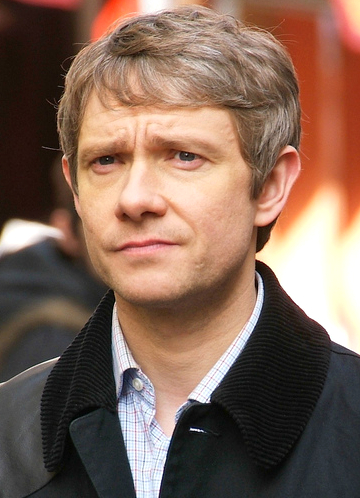
Freeman filming Sherlock in May 2011

He played Dr. John Watson in Sherlock, the BBC contemporary adaptation of the Sherlock Holmes detective stories. Its first episode, "A Study in Pink", was broadcast on 25 July 2010 to critical acclaim. For the role, Freeman won the 2011 BAFTA Award for Best Supporting Actor and the 2014 Primetime Emmy Award for Outstanding Supporting Actor in a Miniseries or a Movie.

Freeman played lead character Bilbo Baggins in Peter Jackson's three-part The Hobbit film series. For his performance in the first part, The Hobbit: An Unexpected Journey, Freeman won Best Hero at the 2013 MTV Movie Awards and Best Actor at the 18th Empire Awards.

Freeman appeared in all three films of Simon Pegg and Edgar Wright's comedic Three Flavours Cornetto trilogy, commencing with a brief non-speaking role in Shaun of the Dead as Yvonne's boyfriend, Declan, followed by a brief cameo in Hot Fuzz as a police officer. He was a main cast member in the 2013 finale to the trilogy, The World's End. On 5 October 2013, he was presented with a fellowship bearing his name by the members of University College Dublin's Literary & Historical Society. In April 2014, he played insurance salesman Lester Nygaard in the dark comedy-crime drama series Fargo, for which he was nominated for a Primetime Emmy Award, a Golden Globe Award, and a Critics' Choice Television Award. He opened in the title role in Shakespeare's play Richard III in July 2014 at Trafalgar Studios.

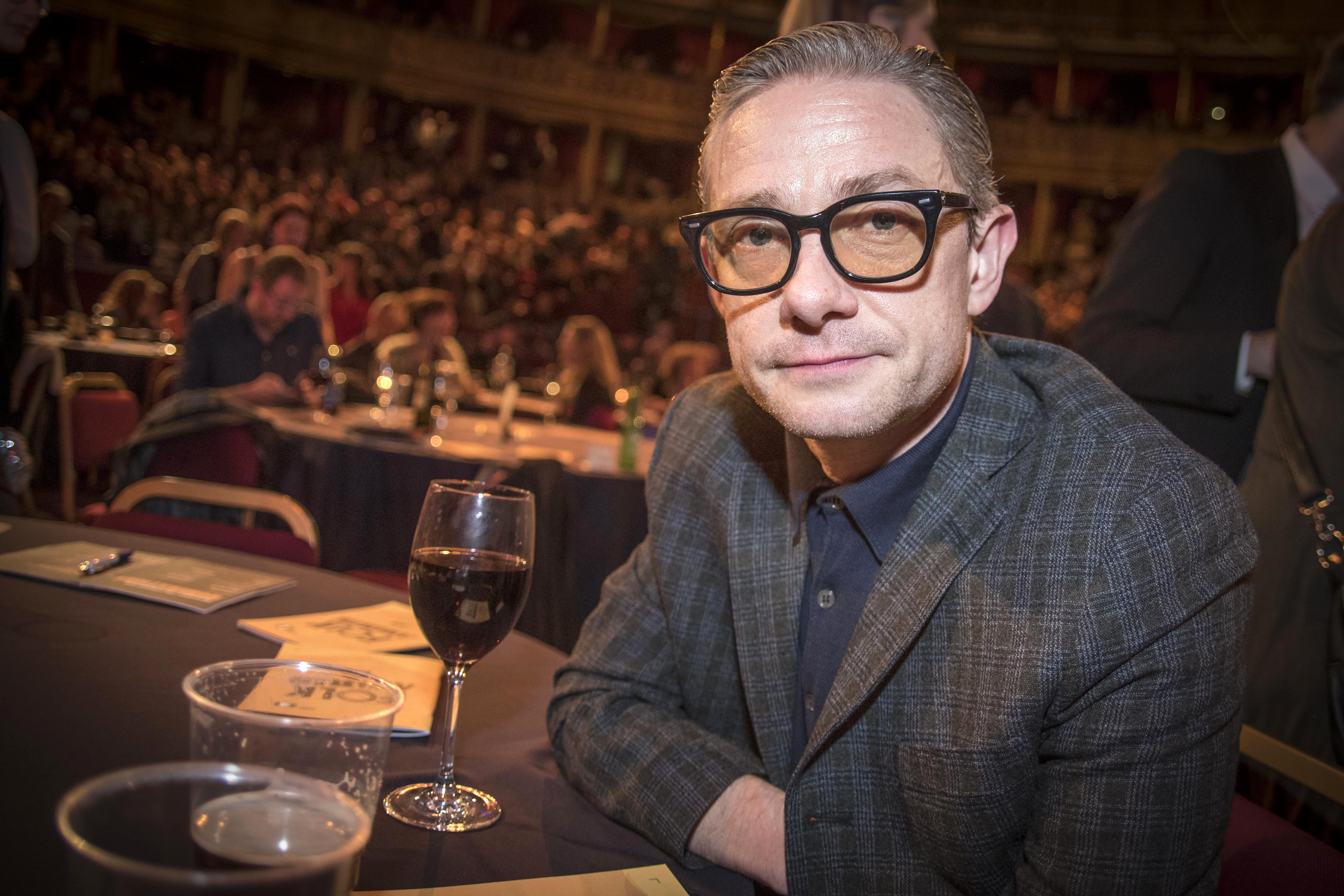
Freeman at the BBC Radio 2 Folk Awards, Royal Albert Hall, April 2016

In 2015, Freeman starred as producer Milton Fruchtman in the television film The Eichmann Show, based on blacklisted TV director Leo Hurwitz's filming of the 1961 trial of Nazi war criminal Adolf Eichmann. It intercut dramatic scenes with historical footage from the trial. The Daily Telegraph described it as "absolutely enthralling". Freeman also played Everett K. Ross, a Central Intelligence Agency agent in Captain America: Civil War, which was released in May 2016.

In 2017, Freeman starred in Cargo, a feature-length remake of a 2013 short film of the same name, which premiered at the Adelaide Film Festival on 6 August 2017. Later that year he appeared opposite Tamsin Greig in Labour of Love, a political comedy by James Graham, at the Noël Coward Theatre. Freeman portrayed fictional Labour MP David Lyons, whose modernising ideas pit him against the traditional left-wing constituency agent Jean Whittaker (Greig).

In 2018, he reprised his role as Everett K. Ross in Black Panther, which was set around two weeks after the event in Captain America: Civil War, making it his second appearance in Marvel Cinematic Universe. Between May 2017 and July 2019, he starred in numerous adverts for Vodafone.

In June 2018, Freeman was part of To Provide All People, a BBC Wales drama celebrating 70 years of the National Health Service.

Since March 2020, Freeman has starred in the FX/Sky One comedy series Breeders, of which he is also a creator and executive producer. On 18 May 2020 FX and Sky One renewed it for a second season.

== Personal life ==
Freeman at the TIFF2026

Freeman lives in the Belsize Park area of London. He previously lived in Potters Bar, Hertfordshire, with actress Amanda Abbington; they were together from 2000 to 2016, and have a son and a daughter. They appeared together in productions such as Sherlock, Swinging with the Finkels, The Debt, The Robinsons, and The All Together. On 22 December 2016, it was reported that they had separated. In 2026, he married actress Rachel Benaissa after approximately six years of dating.

Freeman is a former pescetarian who returned to eating red meat in 2024. He is a non-practising Catholic. He is a close friend of actor Simon Pegg, who is the godfather of his son. Freeman's personal style follows that of British mod subculture, and he cites Paul Weller as one of his heroes and influences on his style.

In 2011, Freeman umpired a charity cricket match to raise money for victims of the Christchurch earthquake.

Freeman's brother, singer-songwriter and website designer Jamie Freeman, died of brain cancer in December 2022.

=== Music ===
Freeman is a fan of soul, Motown and jazz music, and presented an episode of BBC Two's The Culture Show in 2009 titled "Martin Freeman Goes to Motown". He also selected music for a 2006 Motown compilation, Made to Measure, and worked on a jazz compilation with his friend Eddie Piller, Jazz on the Corner; released on Acid Jazz Records on 23 March 2018, it features tracks by Kamasi Washington and The Brand New Heavies. The pair presented The Craig Charles Funk and Soul Show on 31 March 2018. In 2019, a follow-up album, Soul on the Corner, was announced, with tracks by Leroy Hutson and Bobby Womack.

In 2023, Freeman provided spoken word vocals for several tracks on Madness' No. 1 album Theatre of the Absurd Presents C'est la Vie.

=== Political views ===
Freeman is a supporter of the Labour Party. As a teenager, he supported the now-defunct political group Militant and volunteered with the Labour Party Young Socialists. In 2015, he appeared in a party political broadcast to endorse the Labour Party ahead of the 2015 UK general election. In August 2015, he supported Jeremy Corbyn's campaign in the Labour Party leadership election.

== Acting credits ==
=== Film ===
Year	Title	Role	Notes	Ref.
1998	I Just Want to Kiss You	Frank	Short film	
1999	Exhaust	The Car Owner	Short film	
2000	The Low Down	Solomon		
2001	Round About Five	The Man	Short film	
2001	Fancy Dress	Pirate		
2002	Ali G Indahouse	Richard Cunningham		
2003	Love Actually	John		
2004	Blake's Junction 7	Vila	Short film	
2004	Call Register	Kevin		
2004	Shaun of the Dead	Declan	Cameo	
2005	The Hitchhiker's Guide to the Galaxy	Arthur Dent		
2006	Confetti	Matt Norris		
2006	Breaking and Entering	Sandy Hoffmann		
2007	Dedication	Jeremy		
2007	The Good Night	Gary Shaller		
2007	Hot Fuzz	Met. Sergeant		
2007	Lonely Hearts	The Pig	Short film	
2007	The All Together	Chris Ashworth		
2007	Rubbish	Kevin	Short film	
2007	Nightwatching	Rembrandt van Rijn		
2008	Rembrandt's J'Accuse	Rembrandt van Rijn	Documentary	
2009	Nativity!	Paul Maddens		
2009	Swinging with the Finkels	Alvin Finkel		
2010	Wild Target	Hector Dixon		
2010	The Girl is Mime	Clive Buckle	Short film	
2011	What's Your Number?	Simon		
2012	The Pirates! In an Adventure with Scientists!	The Pirate with a Scarf	Voice	
2012	Animals	Albert		
2012	The Hobbit: An Unexpected Journey	Bilbo Baggins		
2013	The World's End	Oliver Chamberlain		
2013	Svengali	Don		
2013	Saving Santa	Bernard D. Elf	Voice	
2013	The Hobbit: The Desolation of Smaug	Bilbo Baggins		
2013	The Voorman Problem	Dr. Williams	Short film	
2014	The Hobbit: The Battle of the Five Armies	Bilbo Baggins		
2015	Midnight of My Life	Steve Marriott	Short film	
2015	Tubby Hayes: A Man in a Hurry	Narrator	Documentary	
2016	Whiskey Tango Foxtrot	Iain MacKelpie		
2016	Captain America: Civil War	Everett K. Ross		
2017	Ghost Stories	Mike Priddle		
2017	Cargo	Andy Rose		
2018	Black Panther	Everett K. Ross		
2019	The Operative	Thomas		
2019	Ode to Joy	Charlie		
2020	A Christmas Carol	Bob Cratchit	Voice	
2022	Black Panther: Wakanda Forever	Everett K. Ross		
2023	Queen of Bones	Malcolm		
2024	Miller's Girl	Jonathan Miller	Also executive producer	
2024	Standing on the Shoulders of Kitties	Himself		
2025	Momo	Master Hora		
2026	Flavia	Havilland De Luce		
2026	Let's Love	Nigel		
2026	A Long Winter			
2026	The Surgeon			

=== Television ===
Year	Title	Role	Notes	Ref.
1997	The Bill	Craig Parnell	Episode: "Mantrap"	
1997	This Life	Stuart	Episode: "Last Tango in Southwark"	
1998	Casualty	Ricky Beck	Episode: "She Loved the Rain"	
1998	Picking Up the Pieces	Brendan	Episode: "1.7"	
2000	Bruiser	Various roles	6 episodes	
2000	Lock, Stock...	Jaap	2 episodes	
2000	Black Books	Doctor	Episode: "Cooking the Books"	
2001	World of Pub	Various roles	5 episodes	
2001	Men Only	Jamie	Television film	
2001–2003	The Office	Tim Canterbury	14 episodes	
2002	Helen West	DC Stone	3 episodes	
2002	Linda Green	Matt	Episode: "Easy Come, Easy Go"	
2003	Charles II: The Power and The Passion	Lord Shaftesbury	Miniseries	
2003	The Debt	Terry Ross	Television film	
2003	Margery & Gladys	D.S. Stringer	Television film	
2003–2004	Hardware	Mike	12 episodes	
2004	Pride	Fleck	Television film	
2005	The Robinsons	Ed Robinson	6 episodes	
2007	Comedy Showcase	Greg Wilson	Episode: "Other People"	
2007	The Old Curiosity Shop	Mr. Codlin	Television film	
2008	When Were We Funniest?	Himself	4 episodes	
2009	Boy Meets Girl	Danny Reed	Miniseries	
2009	Micro Men	Chris Curry	Television film	
2010–2017	Sherlock	Dr. John Watson	13 episodes	
2014	The Life of Rock with Brian Pern	Young Brian Pern	Episode: "Jukebox Musical"	
2014	Saturday Night Live	Host	Episode: "Martin Freeman/Charli XCX"	
2014–2015	Fargo	Lester Nygaard / Narrator	11 episodes	
2015	The Eichmann Show	Milton Fruchtman	Television film	
2015	Robot Chicken	Reverend Parris	Voice, episode: "Zero Vegetables"	
2015	Toast of London	Himself	Episode: "Global Warming"	
2015	Stick Man	Stick Man	Voice, television film	
2016–2017	StartUp	Phil Rask	20 episodes	
2017	Carnage: Swallowing the Past	Jeff	Television film	
2018	To Provide All People	Consultant Cardiologist	Television film	
2019	A Confession	Det. Supt. Steve Fulcher	6 episodes	
2020	Talking Heads	Graham	Episode: "A Chip in the Sugar"	
2020–2023	Breeders	Paul Worsley	40 episodes; also creator and executive producer	
2021	DuckTales	Poe De Spell	Voice, episode: "The Life and Crimes of Scrooge McDuck!"	
2022	Angelyne	Harold Wallach	3 episodes	
2022–2024	The Responder	PC Chris Carson	10 episodes; also executive producer	
2023	Secret Invasion	Everett K. Ross / Everett K. Ross Skrull	2 episodes	
2026	Agatha Christie's Seven Dials	Superintendent Battle	Miniseries	
2026	A Ghost Story for Christmas: The Bride’s Chamber	Goodchild	Upcoming adaptation. Written and directed by Mark Gatiss.	

=== Theatre ===
Year	Title	Role	Venue	Ref.
2002	Kosher Harry	Man	Royal Court Theatre	
2005	Blue Eyes and Heels	Duncan	Soho Theatre	
2010	Clybourne Park	Karl/Steve	Royal Court Theatre	
2014	Richard III	Richard III	Trafalgar Studios	
2017	Labour of Love	David Lyons	Nöel Coward Theatre	
2019	The Dumb Waiter/A Slight Ache	Gus	Harold Pinter Theatre	
2025	The Fifth Step	James	@sohoplace	

== Awards and nominations ==
Year	Work	Award	Category	Result
2002	The Office	British Comedy Awards	Best Comedy Actor	Nominated
2004	The Office (for "The Office Christmas Specials")	BAFTAs	Best Comedy Performance	Nominated
2004	The Office (for "The Office Christmas Specials")	British Comedy Awards	Best TV Comedy Actor	Nominated
2004	Love Actually	Phoenix Film Critics Society	Best Cast	Nominated
2004	Love Actually	Washington DC Area Film Critics Association Award	Best Ensemble Cast	Won
2004	Love Actually	Critics' Choice Movie Awards	Best Acting Ensemble	Nominated
2004	Hardware	Rose d'Or	Best Male Comedy Performance	Won
2011	Sherlock	BAFTAs	Best Supporting Actor	Won
2012	Sherlock	BAFTAs	Best Supporting Actor	Nominated
2012	Sherlock (for "A Scandal in Belgravia")	Primetime Emmy Award	Outstanding Supporting Actor in a Miniseries or a Movie	Nominated
2012	Sherlock (for "A Scandal in Belgravia")	Gold Derby TV Awards	TV movie/Miniseries Supporting Actor	Won
2012	Sherlock	Crime Thriller Awards	Best Supporting Actor	Won
2012	Sherlock	Online Film Critics' Awards	Best Supporting Actor in a Motion Picture or Miniseries	Nominated
2012	Sherlock	PAAFTJ Awards	Best Cast in a Miniseries or TV Movie	Won
2012	Sherlock	PAAFTJ Awards	Best Supporting Actor in a Miniseries or TV Movie	Nominated
2012	Sherlock	Tumblr TV Awards	Hottest Male Character in a TV Show	Nominated
2012	Sherlock	Tumblr TV Awards	Outstanding Supporting Actor in a Drama Series	Won
2012	Sherlock	Tumblr TV Awards	Best Male Character in a TV Series	Nominated
2012	Sherlock	Tumblr TV Awards	Best Cast in a TV Show	Won
2012	The Hobbit: An Unexpected Journey	Total Film Hotlist Awards	Hottest Actor	Nominated
2013	The Hobbit: An Unexpected Journey	Empire Awards	Best Actor	Won
2013	The Hobbit: An Unexpected Journey	Saturn Award	Best Actor	Nominated
2013	The Hobbit: An Unexpected Journey	MTV Movie Awards	Best Scared-as-S**t Performance	Nominated
2013	The Hobbit: An Unexpected Journey	MTV Movie Awards	Best Hero	Won
2013	The Hobbit: An Unexpected Journey	SFX Awards	Best Actor	Nominated
2013	The Hobbit: An Unexpected Journey	Shorts Awards	Visionary Actor	Won
2013	The Hobbit: An Unexpected Journey	New Zealand Movie Awards	Hero of the Year	Nominated
2013	The Hobbit: An Unexpected Journey	Constellation Awards	Best Male Performance In A 2012 Science Fiction Film, TV Movie, Or Mini-Series	Nominated
2013	The Hobbit: An Unexpected Journey	Tumblr Movie Awards	Best Leading Actor	Nominated
2013	The Hobbit: An Unexpected Journey	Tumblr Movie Awards	Best Ship	Nominated
2013	The Hobbit: An Unexpected Journey	Online Film Critics' Awards	Most Cinematic Moment	Nominated
2013	The Hobbit: An Unexpected Journey	Stella Awards	Best Actor in a Leading Role	Won
2013	The World's End	Alternative End of Year Film Awards	Best Ensemble Cast	Won
2014	The Hobbit: The Desolation of Smaug	Empire Awards	Best Actor	Nominated
2014	The Hobbit: The Desolation of Smaug	MTV Movie Awards	Best Hero	Nominated
2014	The Hobbit: The Desolation of Smaug	Constellation Awards	Best Male Performance In A 2013 Science Fiction Film, TV Movie, Or Mini-Series	2nd Place
2014	The Hobbit: The Desolation of Smaug	YouReviewers Awards	Best Hero	Nominated
2014	The Hobbit: The Desolation of Smaug	Stella Awards	Best Actor in a Leading Role	Won
2014	The Hobbit: The Desolation of Smaug	Online Film Critics' Awards	Most Cinematic Moment	Nominated
2014	The Hobbit: The Desolation of Smaug	CinEuphoria Awards	Best Ensemble	Nominated
2014	Fargo	Critics' Choice Television Awards	Best Actor in a Movie or Mini-Series	Nominated
2014	Fargo	Primetime Emmy Awards	Outstanding Lead Actor in a Miniseries or a Movie	Nominated
2014	Fargo	Online Film Critics' Awards	Best Actor in a Motion Picture or Miniseries	Nominated
2014	Fargo	Online Film Critics' Awards	Best Ensemble in a Motion Picture or Miniseries	Nominated
2014	Fargo	Golden Globe Award	Golden Globe Award for Best Actor – Miniseries or Television Film	Nominated
2014	Fargo	Crime Thriller Awards	Best Actor	Nominated
2014	Sherlock	Crime Thriller Awards	Best Actor	Nominated
2014	Sherlock	Critics' Choice Television Awards	Best Supporting Actor in a Movie or Mini-Series	Nominated
2014	Sherlock	Primetime Emmy Awards	Outstanding Supporting Actor in a Miniseries or a Movie	Won
2014	Sherlock	Online Film Critics' Awards	Best Supporting Actor in a Motion Picture or Miniseries	Nominated
2014	Sherlock	Online Film Critics' Awards	Best Ensemble in a Motion Picture or Miniseries	Nominated
2014	The World's End	MTV Movie Awards	Best Fight	Nominated
2015	The Hobbit: The Battle of Five Armies	MTV Movie Awards	Best Hero	Nominated
2015	The Hobbit: The Battle of Five Armies	Favorite British Artists of the Year	Favourite Actor in a Motion Picture	Nominated
2015	Fargo	Favorite British Artists of the Year	Favourite Actor in a Television Series	Nominated
2015	Richard III	The Mousetrap Awards	Best Male Performer	Won
2016	Stick Man	British Animation Awards	Best Voice Performance	Won
2018	Labour of Love	WhatsOnStage Awards	Best Actor in a Play	Nominated
2019	Black Panther	Actor Awards	Outstanding Performance by a Cast in a Motion Picture	Won
2023	The Responder	British Academy Television Awards	Best Actor	Nominated
2023	The Responder	International Emmy Awards	Best Actor	Won

== See also ==
- List of British actors
- List of Primetime Emmy Award winners
- List of International Emmy Award winners
