= Wide Awake (Frazier Chorus album) =

Studio album by Frazier Chorus
- Released: 1995
- Genre: Rock; pop; jangle pop
- Length: 29:21
- Label: Pinkerton
- Producer: Richard Digby Smith

Frazier Chorus chronology
Ray (1991)	Wide Awake (1995)

Singles from Wide Awake
- 1. "Driving" Released: 1996; 2. "Wide Awake" Released: 1996

Pure Records US album cover

Professional ratings
Review scores
Source	Rating
Allmusic	3/5 stars

Wide Awake is the final album by English pop group Frazier Chorus, released in 1995 by Pinkerton Records. In 1996, Pure Records released the album in the US with a different running order and three extra tracks.

== Track listing ==
=== 1995 UK CD ===
Tim Freeman
No.	Title	Length
1.	"Wide Awake"	4:31
2.	"If the Weather Was Up to Me"	3:21
3.	"Bye-Bye Little Bird"	2:57
4.	"Here We Are"	4:10
5.	"Take Us Away"	3:16
6.	"Driving"	3:29
7.	"Lie, Mimic and Mime"	2:57
8.	"Sound Asleep"	4:40
Total length:		29:21

=== 1996 U.S. CD ===
No.	Title	Length
1.	"Wide Awake"	4:32
2.	"If the Weather Was Up to Me"	3:23
3.	"Bye-Bye Little Bird"	2:57
4.	"Driving"	3:16
5.	"Here We Are"	4:10
6.	"Next to No-One"	2:55
7.	"Funny Thing"	3:00
8.	"Take Us Away"	3:19
9.	"Lie, Mimic and Mime"	2:59
10.	"Sound Asleep"	4:43
11.	"Thankyou"	3:03
Total length:		38:16

== Personnel ==
Musicians

- Tim Freeman
- Luke Gordon – programming
- Jamie Freeman – guitars
- Max More – keyboards
- Benny Dimassa – drums
- Johnny Knowles – horns
- Marilena Buck – vocals ("Thank You")
- Ben Blakeman – guitar ("Here We Are")
- General de Gaulle – accordion

Technical

- Richard Digby Smith – producer
- Kevin Westenberg – cover portrait (U.S. edition)
- Kaechele & Kaechele Design – art direction (U.S. edition)
- Lisa Grey – design (U.S. edition)
