= Prisoner 951 =

British television series

- Genre: Drama
- Created by: Stephen Butchard
- Based on: A Yard of Sky by Nazanin Zaghari-Ratcliffe and Richard Ratcliffe
- Written by: Stephen Butchard
- Directed by: Philippa Lowthorpe
- Starring: Narges Rashidi; Joseph Fiennes
- Country of origin: United Kingdom
- Original language: English
- No. of series: 1
- No. of episodes: 4

Production
- Executive producers: Laurence Bowen; Stephen Butchard; Chris Carey; Philippa Lowthorpe
- Producer: Jenny Frayn
- Cinematography: Ole Bratt Birkeland
- Editor: Úna Ní Dhonghaíle
- Running time: 57 minutes
- Production company: Dancing Ledge Productions

Original release
- Network: BBC One
- Release: 23 November – 1 December 2025

Prisoner 951 is a British factual drama television series, starring Narges Rashidi as British-Iranian citizen Nazanin Zaghari-Ratcliffe imprisoned on spying charges for six years in Iran, and Joseph Fiennes as her husband Richard Ratcliffe. The series premiered on BBC One on 23 November 2025 in four parts, and was released in five parts on SBS Television in Australia in March 2026.

== Synopsis ==
British-Iranian citizen Nazanin Zaghari-Ratcliffe was arrested at Imam Khomeini International Airport in Tehran as she was returning to the UK from a family visit in 2016. Forced to leave her 22-month-old daughter with her mother, Zaghari-Ratcliffe was held for six years on spying charges prior to her release and return to the United Kingdom. The series is critical of the British Government's response.

== Cast and characters ==
- Narges Rashidi as Nazanin Zaghari-Ratcliffe
- Joseph Fiennes as Richard Ratcliffe
- Bijan Daneshmand as Baba, Nazanin's father
- Behi Djanati Atai as Mamani, Nazanin's mother
- Ella Varavipour, Mana Sayyah and Ava Rose as Gabriella, Nazanin and Richard's daughter
- Nicholas Farrell as John Ratcliffe, Richard's father
- Marion Bailey as Barbara Ratcliffe, Richard's mother
- Farzana Dua Elahe as Tulip Siddiq MP
- Sam Troughton as Oliver Denton, Siddiq's assistant
- Catherine Bailey as Rebecca Ratcliffe, Richard's sister
- Kavé Niku as Mohammad Zaghari, Nazanin's brother
- Astrid Whettnall as Monique Villa
- Claudia Harrison as Penny Madden
- Ash Goldeh as Interrogator Darvish
- Alastair Mackenzie as Tobias Ellwood MP
- Christopher Colquhoun as James Cleverly MP
- Vivienne Gibbs as Liz Truss MP
- Armin Karima as Seyed, Nazanin's guard/escort
- Melika Foroutan as Narges Mohammadi

== Production ==
The series was directed by Philippa Lowthorpe and written by Stephen Butchard, based on the upcoming book A Yard of Sky by Nazanin Zaghari-Ratcliffe and Richard Ratcliffe, about their experiences of the arrest and the campaign for her release.

The cast was led by Narges Rashidi as Nazanin Zaghari-Ratcliffe and Joseph Fiennes as her husband Richard Ratcliffe.

The series was produced by Fremantle's Dancing Ledge Productions, with Fremantle handling international sales. Filming took place in Greece and the United Kingdom.

== Episodes ==
No.	Episode	Directed by	Written by	Original release date	UK viewers (millions)
1	1	Philippa Lowthorpe	Stephen Butchard	23 November 2025	N/A
2	2	Philippa Lowthorpe	Stephen Butchard	TBA	TBD
3	3	Philippa Lowthorpe	Stephen Butchard	TBA	TBD
4	4	Philippa Lowthorpe	Stephen Butchard	1 December 2025	N/A

== Release ==
The series aired in four parts on BBC One and BBC iPlayer on 23 November 2025.

It aired on SBS Television and SBS on Demand in Australia from 4 March 2026, in five parts of 45 minutes each.

== Reception ==
Phil Harrison of The Guardian gave the series 4 out of 5 stars, praising the "excellent" performances as well as the script.

RadioTimes described Prisoner 951 as a "powerful, unflinching piece of drama". The Observer and The Independent praised both Fiennes' and Rashidi's performances.

In her detailed review of the series, Australian academic Kylie Moore-Gilbert, who was herself imprisoned in Iran under similar circumstances from September 2018 to November 2020 and had met Zaghari-Ratcliffe briefly in prison, wrote: "Objectively, as a piece of television, Prisoner 951 is well-acted and thoughtfully shot—intimate when it needs to be, and appropriately expansive when exploring the broader themes of Zaghari-Ratcliffe's story".

=== Accolades ===
For her role, Rashidi won Best Actress at the Royal Television Society Programme Awards in March 2026. She also won Leading Actress at the British Academy Television Awards. Úna Ní Dhonghaíle won for editing at the British Academy Television Craft Awards.
