= Brandy Zdan =

- Born: Brandy Krista Zdan; Winnipeg, Manitoba, Canada
- Genres: Rock; Indie Rock; Singer-Songwriter
- Occupations: Singer-songwriter; Producer; Musician
- Instruments: Vocals; Guitar; Steel Guitar; Keys
- Years active: 2001–present
- Formerly of: Twilight Hotel, The Trishas

Brandy Zdan is a Canadian musician, songwriter, multi-instrumentalist and record producer based in Nashville, TN. Zdan writes in the rock, indie-rock genre and has been compared to artists like Joan Jett and Susie Quattro with her energetic and engaging stage presence and live show.

== Early life ==
Zdan was raised in Winnipeg, Manitoba where she started playing her own songs in local coffee shops at the age of 15.

== Career ==
Twilight Hotel

In the 2010s, Zdan was a member of the Juno nominated gothic-americana duo Twilight Hotel, based in Winnipeg, Manitoba. They released three studio albums, 2006’s Bethune, 2008’s Highway Prayer, produced by Colin Linden, earning them a Juno nomination for Best Roots Album (Duo/Group). In 2012, they released When the Wolves Go Blind also earning them a second Juno nomination for Best Roots Album (Duo/ Group). After a move to Austin, TX the group disbanded.

In 2011, Zdan joined Texas super-group, The Trishas, as their multi-instrumentalist playing guitar, steel and accordion until 2014 when she relocated to Nashville, TN.

Solo career

Zdan released her self-titled album in November 2015, produced by Teddy Morgan and featuring members of My Morning Jacket, Carl Broemal and Tom Blankenship. On May 11, 2018, Zdan released her second album, Secretear, on Tallest Man Records which was featured in Relix and Guitar World. Rolling Stone named her “a guitar hero of the highest order." Zdan has toured all over North America, the UK and Europe and has opened for notable acts as Buddy Guy, The Romantics, Doyle Bramhall II, Will Hoge, Aaron Lee Tasjan and more. Zdan is a Fender and Gibson endorsed artist.

== Record production ==
- 2023 - ZDAN - “Perfect Day” Co-Produced by Zdan & Josh Grange
- 2022 - Zdan produced Emily Scott Robinson's “Built on Bones” (Oh Boy Records)
- 2022 - ZDAN - “Break My Stride” Produced & Engineered by Brandy Zdan
- 2021 - Brandy Zdan - "Falcon"
- 2021 - Kelly Hoppenjans - “Can’t Get the Dark Out”
- 2020 - Kimberley Macgregor - "Sitting, With Uncomfortable Feelings"
- 2019 - Kelly Hoppenjans - "Ok, I Feel better now"
- 2018 - Brandy Zdan - "Secretear" (co-produced)

== Discography ==
Solo albums

- Falcon, 2021
- Lone Hunter EP, 2013
- Heart Theft, Instrumentals 1, 2014
- Brandy Zdan, Self titled, 2015
- Secretear, 2018

Singles

- Break my stride, 2022
- Perfect Day, 2023
- Wild Fire (LIVE), 2018
- I Wanna Dance With Somebody ( Who loves Me), 2019

Albums with Twilight Hotel

- Bethune, 2006
- Highway Prayer, 2008
- When the Wolves go Blind, 2012

== Song and musician credits ==
2015

- Kevin Costner & Modern West / Where the Music Takes You
  - Background Vocals
- Josh Taerk/ Here’s to Change
  - Background Vocals

2017

- Drew Kennedy / At Home in the Big Lonesome
  - Background Vocals

2018

- Jamie Freeman / Dreams about Falling
  - Songwriter/ Background Vocals
- No Dry Country / Panhandle Music
  - Background Vocals
- Johnny Chops & the Razors / Self- Titled
  - Background Vocals

== Film and television placements ==
- “People Like Us” 1 Mile to You Film Soundtrack (2016)
- “Only the Sad Songs” MTV’s Awkward (2016)
- “More of a Man” MTV’s Awkward (2016)
- “Wild Fire” Freeform Network’s Good Trouble (2018)
- ‘Wild Fire” CW Network’s Charmed (2018)
- “Get To You” & “ I Want Your Trouble” Netflix’s Terrace House (Japan) (2018)
- “Living is a Sin” CW Network’s In The Dark (2018)
