= Edward Easton =

American politician

- Born: July 8, 1936; New York City, US
- Died: August 28, 2019 (aged 83); Santa Barbara, California, US
- Education: Yale University

Edward Easton (July 8, 1936 – August 28, 2019) was an American politician who earned a Bachelor of Arts in Political Science in 1958 and a Master's degree in Architecture from Yale University in 1965. Representing the Democratic Party, he was elected to the Goleta City Council of Goleta, California, in 2008 through 2014, and served a term as the city's Mayor in 2012.

== Early life ==
Easton was born in New York City and was raised in Connecticut. He married Carolyn R. Williams in 1959. As a couple, the Eastons moved to the South Coast in 2000 and settled in Goleta, California.

== Business career ==
While earning his master's degree in architecture from Yale University in 1965, Easton worked on redevelopment projects for the City of New Haven, Connecticut on the City Plan Commission. Easton thereafter became an architect in Charlotte, North Carolina in 1968. In 1971, Easton worked as the Program Development Director and the Director of Regional Planning for the Centralina Council of Governments. Easton also worked on various wilderness campaigns, founded the Central Piedmont Group of the Sierra Club in Charlotte, and became the Appalachian Regional Vice President of the Sierra Club in the later 1970s. Afterwards, Easton worked for the National Wildlife Federation and became the chief executive officer of the Institute for Conservation Leadership from 1979 to the 1990s.

== 2008 election ==
Easton was sworn in as a new Goleta City Council Member in December 2008 in Goleta, California.

== 2012 election ==
Easton ran unopposed for re-election to the Goleta City Council 2012 in Goleta, California and served a term as Mayor of Goleta following his reelection.

== Retirement ==
After his stint as Mayor, Easton intended to serve out his term on the Goleta City Council, but had to step down in 2014 after purchasing a home outside the Goleta city limits, which made him ineligible to serve on the council. He died following complications from a stroke on August 28, 2019.
