= Nazanin Zaghari-Ratcliffe =

Iranian-British dual citizen (born 1978)

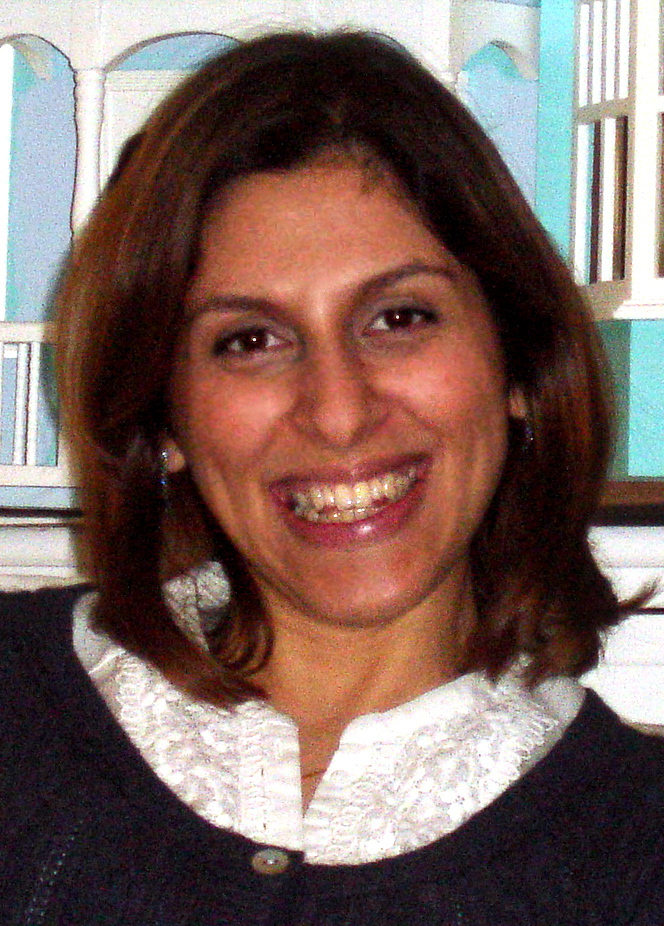
- Zaghari-Ratcliffe in 2011
- Born: Nazanin Zaghari; 26 December 1978 (age 47); Tehran, Imperial State of Iran
- Citizenship: Iran; United Kingdom (since 2013)
- Education: University of Tehran (BA); London Metropolitan University (MSc)
- Known for: Imprisonment in Iran (2016–2022)
- Spouse: Richard Ratcliffe (m. 2009)
- Children: 1
- Awards: BBC 100 Women (2022)

Nazanin Zaghari-Ratcliffe (née Zaghari; Persian: نازنین زاغری; born 26 December 1978) is an Iranian-British dual citizen who was detained in Iran from 3 April 2016 to 16 March 2022 as part of a long-running dispute between Britain and Iran. In early September 2016, she was sentenced to five years in prison after being found guilty of plotting to topple the Iranian government. While in prison, she went on at least three hunger strikes trying to persuade Iranian authorities to provide medical treatment for her health problems. She was temporarily released on 17 March 2020 during the COVID-19 pandemic in Iran, but subject to electronic monitoring.

In October 2017, the prosecutor general of Tehran made a new claim that Zaghari-Ratcliffe was being held for running "a BBC Persian online journalism course which was aimed at recruiting and training people to spread propaganda against Iran". Zaghari-Ratcliffe has always denied the spying charges against her, and her husband maintains that his wife "was imprisoned as leverage for a debt owed by the UK over its failure to deliver tanks to Iran in 1979."

On 7 March 2021, her original sentence ended, but she was scheduled to face a second set of charges on 14 March. On 26 April, she was found guilty of propaganda activities against the government and sentenced to another year in prison. She appealed but on 16 October 2021, her appeal was rejected by the Iranian court. Zaghari-Ratcliffe was finally released on 16 March 2022 immediately after Britain repaid an outstanding debt of £393.8 million to Iran. She returned to the United Kingdom the next day.

== Early life and education ==
Nazanin Zaghari was born and brought up in Tehran and studied English literature at the University of Tehran, before becoming an English teacher. Following the 2003 Bam earthquake she worked as a translator in the relief effort for the Japan International Cooperation Agency. She later worked for the International Federation of Red Cross and Red Crescent Societies and then moved to the World Health Organization as a communications officer.

In 2007, Zaghari-Ratcliffe moved to the UK after receiving a scholarship to study for a Masters in Communication Management at London Metropolitan University.

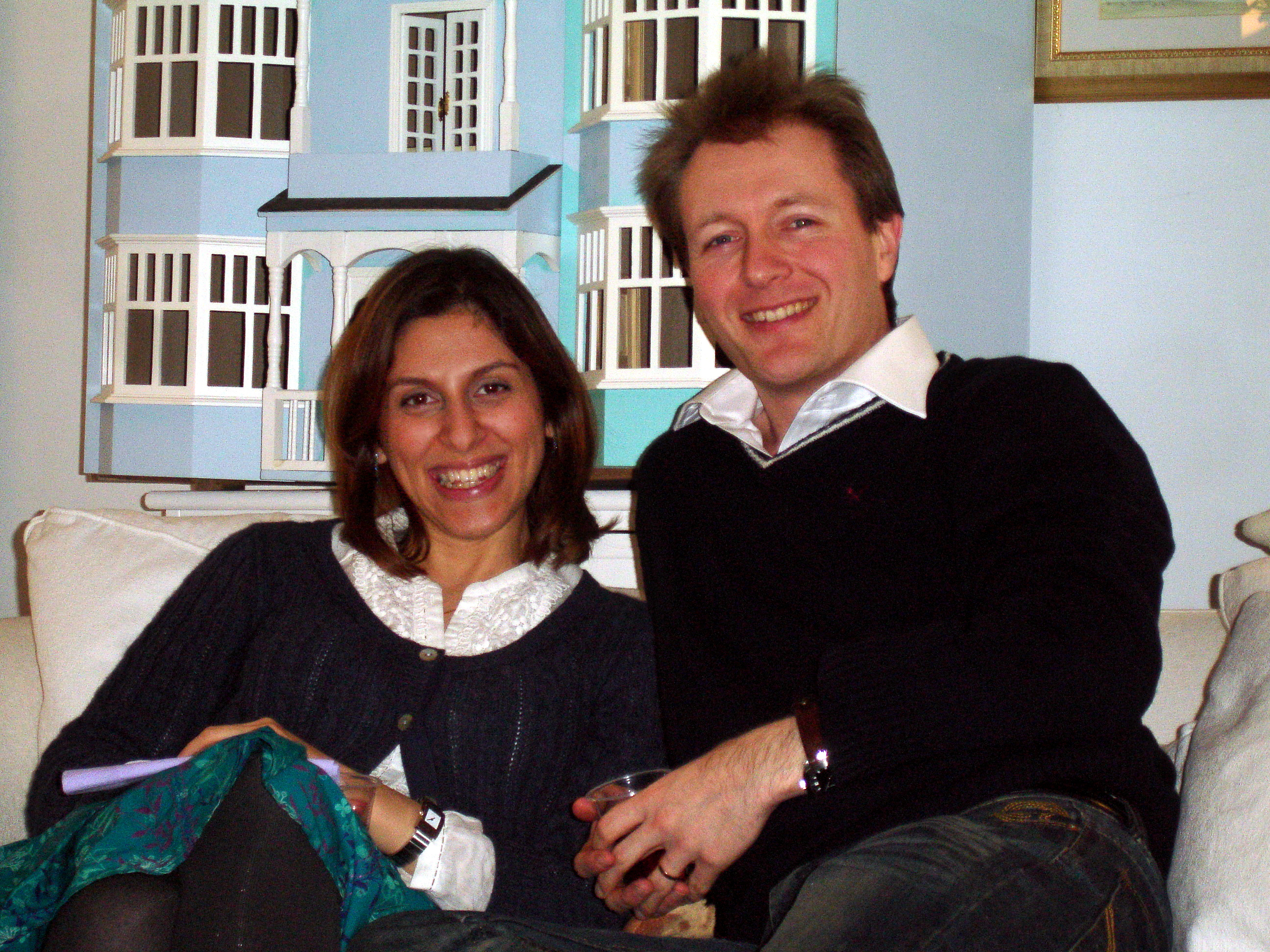
With husband Richard Ratcliffe, 2011

Shortly after her arrival in the UK she met her future husband, Richard Ratcliffe, through mutual friends. The couple married in August 2009 in Winchester and their daughter was born in June 2014. Zaghari-Ratcliffe became a British citizen in 2013. Zaghari-Ratcliffe used to return to Iran from time to time enabling her parents to see her daughter. When travelling to Iran she would always do so on her Iranian passport, as required by Iranian law. Zaghari-Ratcliffe used her British passport for all other international travel.

Zaghari-Ratcliffe worked for the BBC World Service Trust from February 2009 to October 2010, then worked at the Thomson Reuters Foundation as a project coordinator before taking on the role of a project manager.

== Arrest and trial ==
On 17 March 2016, Zaghari-Ratcliffe travelled to visit her family for Nowruz (Iranian New Year) with her 22-month-old daughter. On 3 April 2016, members of Iran's Revolutionary Guard arrested her at the Imam Khomeini Airport as she and her daughter were about to board a flight back to the UK. Her daughter's British passport was confiscated during the arrest, but later returned, and she remained in Iran under the care of her maternal grandparents so she could visit her mother.

The reason for her arrest was unclear. Zaghari-Ratcliffe had worked for the BBC World Service Trust (now called BBC Media Action) between February 2009 and October 2010. This is an international charity that provided training courses to Iranian citizen journalists and bloggers in its Iran Media Development Project's ZigZag magazine and associated radio programme. Iran seemed to believe the BBC was a tool for British espionage and in 2014, several graduates were convicted and sentenced by Iran to up to 11 years in jail for their participation in these courses.

BBC Media Action described her role there as "junior and purely administrative". By the time of her arrest, Zaghari-Ratcliffe was working for the Thomson Reuters Foundation. CEO of the Thomson Reuters Foundation, Monique Villa, said “Nazanin has been working at the Thomson Reuters Foundation for the past four years as a project coordinator in charge of grants applications and training, and had no dealing with Iran in her professional capacity.”

In early September 2016, Zaghari-Ratcliffe was sentenced to five years in prison for allegedly plotting to overthrow the Iranian government. The prosecutor general of Tehran stated in October 2017 that she was imprisoned for running "...a BBC Persian online journalism course which was aimed at recruiting and training people to spread propaganda against Iran".

== Imprisonment ==
On 23 August 2018, Zaghari-Ratcliffe was released on furlough for three days, which is standard practice prior to lengthier releases. However, Zaghari-Ratcliffe suffered from panic attacks after returning to prison, and regretted having been given the temporary release. Her husband said the furlough was a "cruel game" subject to conditions including the monitoring of her movements.

In late September 2018, when questioned about the Zaghari-Ratcliffe case, Iranian President Hassan Rouhani acknowledged awareness of the case (though denying knowledge of its specifics), and noted that "new charges [had been] brought against her." Rouhani compared the imprisonment of foreigners in Iran to the imprisonment of Iranians in Western countries, saying that leaders on both sides were denying power over the decisions of their own judiciary, and that "we must all" exert "a constant, concerted effort... so... all prisoners must be free... but it must be a path that travels both ways."

In March 2019, the British Foreign and Commonwealth Office (FCO) granted Zaghari-Ratcliffe diplomatic protection, raising the status of her case from a consular matter to a dispute between the two governments. Iran argues the designation is contrary to international law, the Master Nationality Rule, with Iran's ambassador in London stating "Governments may only exercise such protection for own nationals, ... Iran does not recognise dual nationality".

On 11 October 2019, Zaghari-Ratcliffe's daughter returned to her father in the United Kingdom to start school.

In December 2019, the prosecutor general of Iran denied conditional release for Nazanin Zaghari, which had been requested by her lawyer.

In March 2020, at the height of the COVID-19 pandemic in Iran – when Supreme Leader Ayatollah Khamenei announced plans to pardon 10,000 prisoners and temporarily release 85,000 to fight a surge of COVID-19 infections in prisons – Zaghari-Ratcliffe was released on a temporary basis. Her husband reported that she had been ill for two weeks with COVID-19 symptoms but had not been tested and did not require hospitalization.

While on parole she lived at her parents' house in Tehran but was required to wear an electronic tag and remain within 300 metres of the house. She was able to make video calls for several hours a day to her husband and daughter. Her parole was later extended until 18 April. Her release was again delayed in April, to 20 May according to her husband. Her family said on 20 May that her release had been delayed indefinitely.

On 8 September 2020, Iranian state media said that Zaghari-Ratcliffe was facing new charges. On 13 September, her trial was postponed. In October it was scheduled for 2 November. Despite repeated requests, no British officials were allowed to observe it.

Zaghari-Ratcliffe's sentence ended on 7 March 2021. The day before, Nazanin's husband, Richard Ratcliffe, had expressed that he and his daughter were waiting "very anxiously" for the release. He also said that they were not sure if she'd be released, as "the arrangements haven't been clarified". She was freed as scheduled but with a new court case against her booked for 14 March. On that date she appeared on charges of propaganda against the regime and was told to expect a verdict within seven working days.

On 26 April 2021, she was found guilty of propaganda activities against the government, sentenced to one year in prison and banned from leaving Iran for a year. Her lawyer said that she had been accused of taking part in a demonstration in London 12 years before and giving an interview to the BBC Persian service.

== Prisoners swap dispute ==
On 24 April 2019, Iranian foreign minister Mohammad Javad Zarif suggested an official swap between Zaghari-Ratcliffe and Negar Ghodskani, an Iranian citizen being held in Australia on a US extradition warrant. Britain rejected a prisoner-swap proposal by Iran's foreign minister, calling it a "vile" diplomatic manoeuvre. An Iranian state TV report quoted an anonymous Iran official on 2 May 2021 as stating that the United Kingdom had agreed to settle its debt of £400 million in return for her release. The British government denied this the next day, saying the negotiations about the debt, accrued due to it not delivering tanks to Iran as agreed in a deal made in the 1970s, were separate from her case and still ongoing.

== 1971 arms deal dispute ==
In February 2018, Richard Ratcliffe said he believed his wife's release was dependent on the interest on a £450 million debt the UK has owed to Iran since the 1970s for a cancelled arms deal. In October 2019, he repeated this with more detail, stating that a UK government agency was using "every legal roadblock to delay and minimise the payment".

In 1971, the Iranian government, then under the Shah of Iran, paid Britain for an order for more than 1,500 Chieftain tanks and other armoured vehicles as part of a £650 million deal. Following the fall of the Shah's regime in 1979, Britain cancelled the undelivered part of the order and the new Islamic regime asked for a partial refund on undelivered tanks. A legal dispute existed between Britain and Iran ever since. In May 2021, after his wife had her sentence extended yet again, Richard Ratcliffe authored a piece for Declassified UK in which he wrote that the "secretive, unaccountable" UK arms trade was a danger to Nazanin and British citizens everywhere.

In January 2016, the United States refunded Iran $400 million for undelivered military equipment which was associated with the release of four Iranian-Americans, including Washington Post journalist Jason Rezaian, which could be viewed as a precedent for Zaghari-Ratcliffe's situation.

According to Zaghari-Ratcliffe, she was told by her military interrogators of the link between her detention and the disputed arms deal. This claim was denied by both the Iranian Foreign Ministry and the British Foreign Office, with the latter stating:

This is a longstanding case and relates to contracts signed over 40 years ago with the pre-revolution Iranian regime. We and the Iranians reject any idea the two issues are linked. Funding to settle the debt was paid to the High Court by the Treasury and the International Military Services (IMS) in 2002. Iran's Ministry of Defence remains subject to EU sanctions.

Richard Ratcliffe reaffirmed his belief that his wife was being used as a bargaining chip in the dispute over the unpaid IMS debt and talks over the Joint Comprehensive Plan of Action nuclear enrichment deal with Iran. However, he believed recent reports on Iranian TV suggested the governments were in the middle of negotiations. On 2 May 2021, British Foreign Secretary Dominic Raab said Iran was using Zaghari-Ratcliffe in "a cat-and-mouse game", and her treatment "amounts to torture". The debt repayment deal failed, which Prime Minister Boris Johnson later explained as "difficult to settle and square away for all sorts of reasons to do with sanctions".

On 16 March 2022, Foreign Secretary Liz Truss announced that after months of negotiations the government had paid the debt of £393.8 million to Iran, ring-fenced for humanitarian use only. The same day the travel ban on Zaghari-Ratcliffe was rescinded and she flew back to the UK.

On 21 March 2022, the House of Commons Foreign Affairs Select Committee announced it would hold an inquiry into the delay in paying the debt to Iran. The former Middle East minister Alistair Burt had written to the committee stating that even while in office he could not discover which part of government was resisting paying the debt, and suggested the committee should now investigate.

== Release campaign ==
=== Richard Ratcliffe ===
On 7 May 2016, Zaghari-Ratcliffe's husband, Richard Ratcliffe, launched an online petition urging both the Prime Minister of the United Kingdom and Iran's supreme leader to take appropriate action to secure the safe return of his wife and daughter. By June 2019, the petition had more than 3.5 million supporters in 155 countries.

Also in June 2019, both Richard and Nazanin Zaghari-Ratcliffe went on hunger strike in protest at Nazanin's imprisonment, with Richard Ratcliffe camping outside the Iranian Embassy in London. They both ended the hunger strike on 29 June 2019 after 15 days.

In September 2021, Richard Ratcliffe and the release campaigns called on the British government to sanction individual Iranian officials involved with the detention with asset freezes and travel bans. Richard Ratcliffe called the detention "hostage-taking".

On 24 October 2021, Richard Ratcliffe went on a second hunger strike in an effort to persuade the British government to expand the efforts in calling for his wife’s release from detention in Iran. His hunger strike took place outside the Foreign Office in London. On 9 November 2021, the 17th day of his hunger strike, there was mounting concern over his health. On 13 November 2021 Richard Ratcliffe ended his hunger strike after 21 days, stating that their daughter "needs two parents".

=== Boris Johnson comments ===
A central part of Zaghari-Ratcliffe's defence was that she was there on a holiday and never worked to train journalists in the country. However, on 1 November 2017, the then-British Foreign Secretary Boris Johnson said "When we look at what Nazanin Zaghari-Ratcliffe was doing, she was simply teaching people journalism, as I understand it, at the very limit." These remarks appeared to have put her at risk, prompting condemnation from Leader of the Opposition, Jeremy Corbyn, who called for Johnson to be sacked.

Her employer, Thomson Reuters Foundation, called on Johnson to "immediately correct the serious mistake he made" in this statement. They added, "She is not a journalist and has never trained journalists at the Thomson Reuters Foundation". Four days later Zaghari-Ratcliffe was returned to court in Iran, where the Foreign Secretary's statement was cited as evidence against her.

Zaghari-Ratcliffe was thought likely to appear in court again on 10 December 2017 to face additional charges relating to her work for the BBC World Service Trust; however Iranian court officials released a statement that no new charges had been raised and these reports were false. Johnson visited Tehran on 9 December 2017, raising the case of Zaghari-Ratcliffe.

=== United Nations ===
The United Nations had on several occasions called for Zaghari-Ratcliffe's release. On 7 October 2016, the United Nations rapporteur on human rights in Iran, Ahmed Shaheed, called on Iran to immediately release Zaghari-Ratcliffe. The call was repeated a year later by Shaheed's successor, Asma Jahangir, as well as by José Antonio Guevara Bermúdez, Chair-Rapporteur of the Working Group on Arbitrary Detention: "We consider that Ms. Zaghari-Ratcliffe has been arbitrarily deprived of her liberty and that her right to a fair trial before an independent and impartial tribunal has been violated … These are flagrant violations of Iran's obligations under international law". The Working Group on Arbitrary Detention had also formally called for her immediate release in its Opinion 28/2016, adopted in August 2016.

Further calls for Zaghari-Ratcliffe's release were made by the US Congress, the Canadian Parliament, and the European Parliament.

=== Coronavirus pandemic ===
In February 2020, as the COVID-19 pandemic spread to Iran, Zaghari-Ratcliffe was suspected of falling ill with COVID-19 from the SARS-CoV-2 virus. Her family called on the UK and Iranian governments to ensure that Zaghari-Ratcliffe was tested for the virus and received proper medical treatment. However, Iran's judiciary spokesman Gholamhossein Esmaili said she did not have coronavirus and was in "good health". Gholamhossein also described reports of her infection as "propaganda".

On 17 March, she was temporarily freed for two weeks, which was later extended indefinitely. After her new trial was postponed in September, the Foreign Office called for her to be permanently released. Kate Allen, director of Amnesty International UK, called it nonsense that the trial had been moved, saying she had already faced an unjust trial. She accused the Iranian government of playing cruel political games on her and asked the British government to work harder for her release.

=== Consular assistance ===
In December 2020, in relation to Zaghari-Ratcliffe's imprisonment it was widely reported that British citizens arrested abroad do not have a right to government help or protection even if they are being tortured. However, in normal circumstances, British citizens abroad are eligible for consular assistance in times of need. The legal difficulty for the British Foreign Office in this particular case was that Zaghari-Ratcliffe was arrested in the country of her birth citizenship and in a country which does not recognise dual nationality for Iranian citizens. Furthermore, during her visits to Iran, Zaghari-Ratcliffe entered the country using her Iranian passport. The FCDO have acknowledged the risk to dual nationals of arrest and detention in its travel advice to persons travelling to Iran.

== Release ==
Zaghari-Ratcliffe was released, together with Anoosheh Ashoori, on 16 March 2022. Boarding a Royal Air Force of Oman plane, the pair arrived in Muscat that day and returned to the United Kingdom the next day in a government-chartered flight to RAF Brize Norton. Zaghari-Ratcliffe and her family stayed their first few days at Dorneywood, a government grace-and-favour country house.

The decision to release her has been linked to the UK's payment of the £393.8 million debt related to the unfulfilled arms deal in the 1970s, although the Iranian government have denied this, and British Foreign Secretary Liz Truss called them "parallel issues". Other factors which have been described as contributory included her family's campaigning, British diplomacy's focus on the issue and an alignment of interests between the two countries during the Russian invasion of Ukraine. English humanitarian Terry Waite, who was held captive for four years in Lebanon from 1987 to 1991, said that Zaghari-Ratcliffe "should tell her story".

Zaghari-Ratcliffe said in a press conference soon after her release that the feeling of returning home was "precious" and "glorious" but also criticised the government's response to her imprisonment commenting that "I have seen five foreign secretaries change over the course of six years. How many foreign secretaries does it take for someone to come home?" and "We all know… how I came home. It should have happened exactly six years ago." Former foreign secretary Jeremy Hunt sympathised with this, arguing on social media that "Those criticising Nazanin [for her views on her imprisonment] have got it so wrong. She doesn't owe us gratitude: we owe her an explanation. She's absolutely right that it took too long to bring her home."

== Mahsa Amini protests ==
Because of the Mahsa Amini protests, Zaghari-Ratcliffe cut her hair publicly as a symbol of opposition to tyranny in the Islamic Republic of Iran.

== Media ==
On 28 December 2022, Zaghari-Ratcliffe was the guest editor on the Today programme. She told Andy Murray that she had experienced a rare moment of joy during her imprisonment when her captors gave her a television, on which she saw him win the Men's singles at the 2016 Wimbledon Championships.

A dramatisation of her story was made into the BBC series Prisoner 951, released in October 2025.

== See also ==
- Hostage diplomacy
- Iran–United Kingdom relations
- List of foreign nationals detained in Iran
- Anoosheh Ashoori
- Marjan Davari
- Kamal Foroughi
- Ghoncheh Ghavami
- List of Iranian women prisoners and detainees
