= Sex tourism in Ukraine =

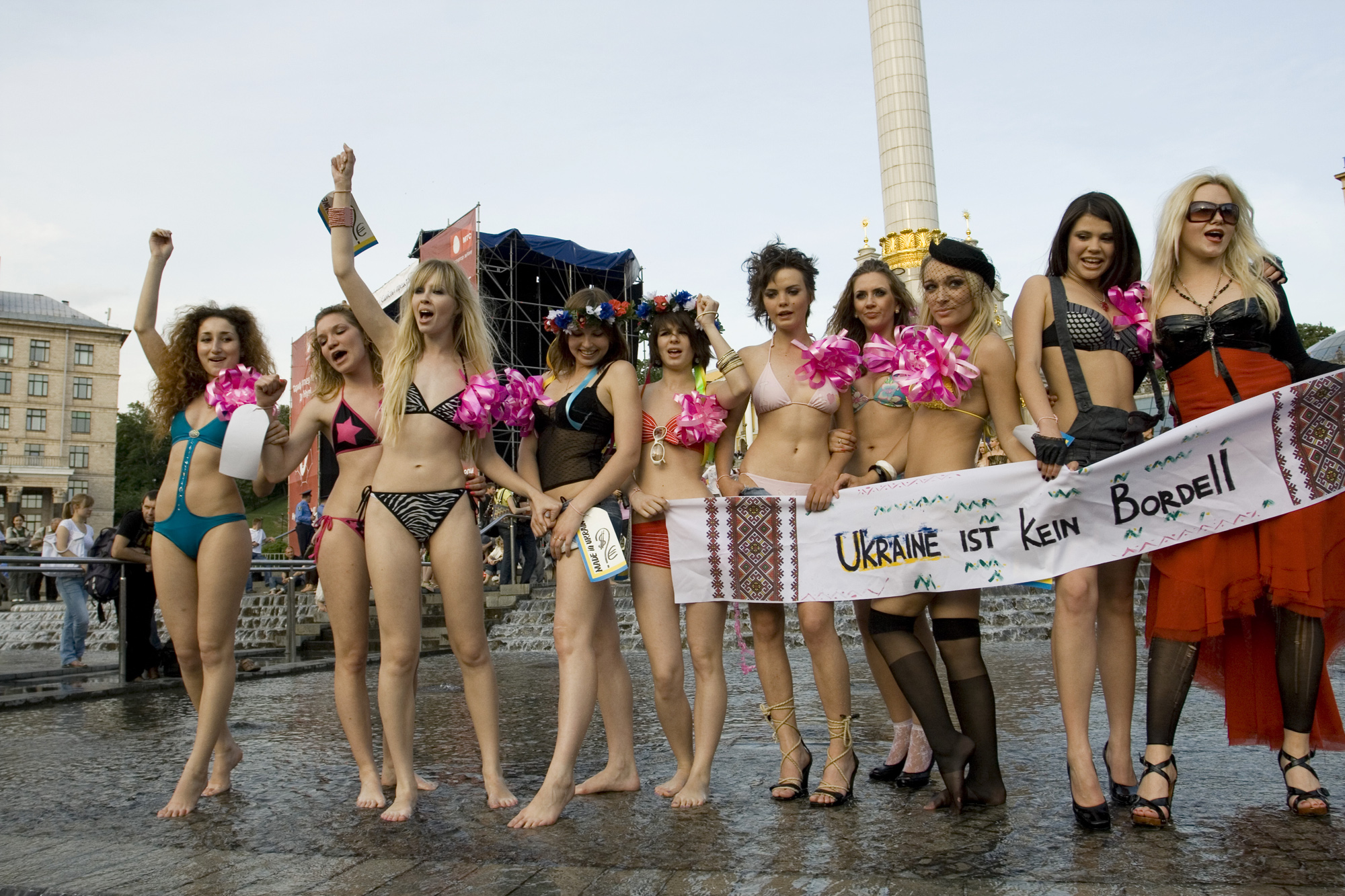
Feminist group FEMEN on their way to protest against prostitution and sex tourism in Ukraine (2009)

Sex tourism in Ukraine is visiting the country for the purposes of sexual activity. It is on rise as the country attracts many foreign visitors. The main reason for the situation stems from the combined effect of various factors. Currently, in Ukraine, the effect is constituted by a high level of population poverty and its feminization, limited options for social mobility and a very active system of organized crime.

The majority of the Ukrainian sex industry exists underground and prospers due to poor law enforcement and widespread corruption. Despite making the criminal penalties for human trafficking and coerced prostitution tougher, the laws criminalizing organized prostitution have had little effect.

In 2013 sex tourism within Ukrainian borders was reported to be growing considerably, raising concern in Ukrainian society and attracting condemnation from feminist activists such as FEMEN.

== General background ==
The Ukrainian magazine Korrespondent had reported that after the government launched the visa-free policy with Western Europe, the number of western visitors traveling to Ukraine went up and continued to rise. In 2004, the total number of tourists was around 8 million, in 2006 it was 16 million, and in 2008 it had gone up to 20 million. Each foreigner spends about €106 (₴3,388) per day in Ukraine. For many people who travel to Ukraine for sex, the reputation of the country became a rival to that of Thailand.

According to Ukrainian mass media, the country became a center for motley hordes of sexual adventurers because the price of a visit to Ukraine does not exceed US$1,500 (₴40,456). After the Euromaidan protests of late 2013 to early 2014, salaries plummeted, while inflation skyrocketed. As a result, an hourly rate for sex with local women typically ranges from $10 (₴270) to $75 (₴2,023), and is much lower than in other European countries. It was noted that after the political turmoil of 2014 and the war in Eastern Ukraine, the Western guests started to perceive the country as an "unstable black hole." Nevertheless, Ukraine became a very popular destination for Turkey's middle-class visitors, who have a special predilection for Slavic women. The trips to Ukraine for sex tourism created a stereotype in Turkish culture promoted by movies and books. American former pickup artist Roosh V published a travel guide describing his experience of dating Ukrainian women. After public release, the manual attracted a lot of coverage in Ukrainian media and outrage from feminist organizations.

An aspect of sex tourism in Ukraine is related to the business of marriage. Marriage agencies run scams throughout the country, emptying tourists' wallets as they go. With regards to the situation, the United States embassy published a list of typical local fraud techniques for Americans who visit Ukraine to meet their prospective spouses.

== Sexual exploitation of children ==
Involvement of adolescent boys into prostitution in Ukraine has raised a number of special concerns.

It was noted that the Ukrainian legislation system has no such term as "sexual exploitation of children in travel and tourism". In addition to this, low living standards, neglected children, ubiquitous corruption and social consumerism make Ukraine a fast-growing market for child sex services. The problem is aggravated by many other reasons, such as geographical situation in the European continent, large economic gaps between the home countries of sex tourists and locals, absence of visa requirements for many tourists, low prices for alcohol, reputation of a corrupted society and high chance to avoid any kind of criminal prosecution.

According to the collected statistics, 26% of Ukrainian families with one child and 39% families with two children (4.4 and 6.6 million correspondingly) are struggling to survive whilst living below the poverty line. Poverty leaves no other option to many people except providing sex services for rich and wealthy foreign guests.

A 2008 research of the Ukrainian sex workers' lifestyle revealed that 39% of them do not use condoms regularly and that 22% are drug users.

Child-sex trafficking is a serious problem in Ukraine, with different studies coming to different estimates about its incidence, and pointing to a general trend of heavily declining rates since the early 2000. A study by the Ukrainian Institute for Social Research, published 2001, found that 31% of prostitutes in Ukraine were under 18.

A 2020-2021 demographic survey of thousands of Ukrainians in sex work, conducted in various parts of the country, indicated a massive decline in the incidence of minors, compared to the 2001 numbers. Of persons engaged in sex work in Ukraine, 95.6% were over 19, and only between 0.5% and 1.5% were minors.

Similarly, a 2021 demographic study of 560 sex workers from Dnipro showed much lower rates of child prostitution than the 2001 study, with over 75% of sex workers being 22 or older and 93% having completed high school (the 7% of those who did not have high school degrees included both prostituted minors and adult sex workers who never graduated). However, the study still found girls as young as 14 who were being prostituted, attesting to the ongoing problem of child-sex trafficking in Ukraine.

== Media coverage ==
Ukrainian media regularly covers the topics of human trafficking, prostitution, and sex tourism in Ukraine. Especially, a great amount of media attention was brought to these issues in regard to final rounds of European Football Championship 2012. For example, in the Polish press, all football fans traveling to Ukraine were depicted as sex tourists and all Ukrainian women as potential sexual targets. Also, the Ukrainian people were derogatorily labeled by the Polish media as poor, corrupt, criminal, HIV-positive and undemocratic. As a result, in 2012 there was an outbreak of hysteria over "sex tourism" among Ukrainian soccer fans. At the peak of the obsession, roving gangs of local vigilantes even attacked foreigners who ordered prostitutes, and posted the videos of beatings online.

== See also ==
- Poverty in Ukraine
- Corruption in Ukraine
- Crime in Ukraine
- Prostitution in Ukraine
- HIV/AIDS in Ukraine
- Street children in Ukraine
- Child prostitution in Ukraine
- Gender inequality in Ukraine
- Human trafficking in Ukraine
- Women's rights in Ukraine
- Violence against women in Ukraine
