= Prostitution in Ukraine =

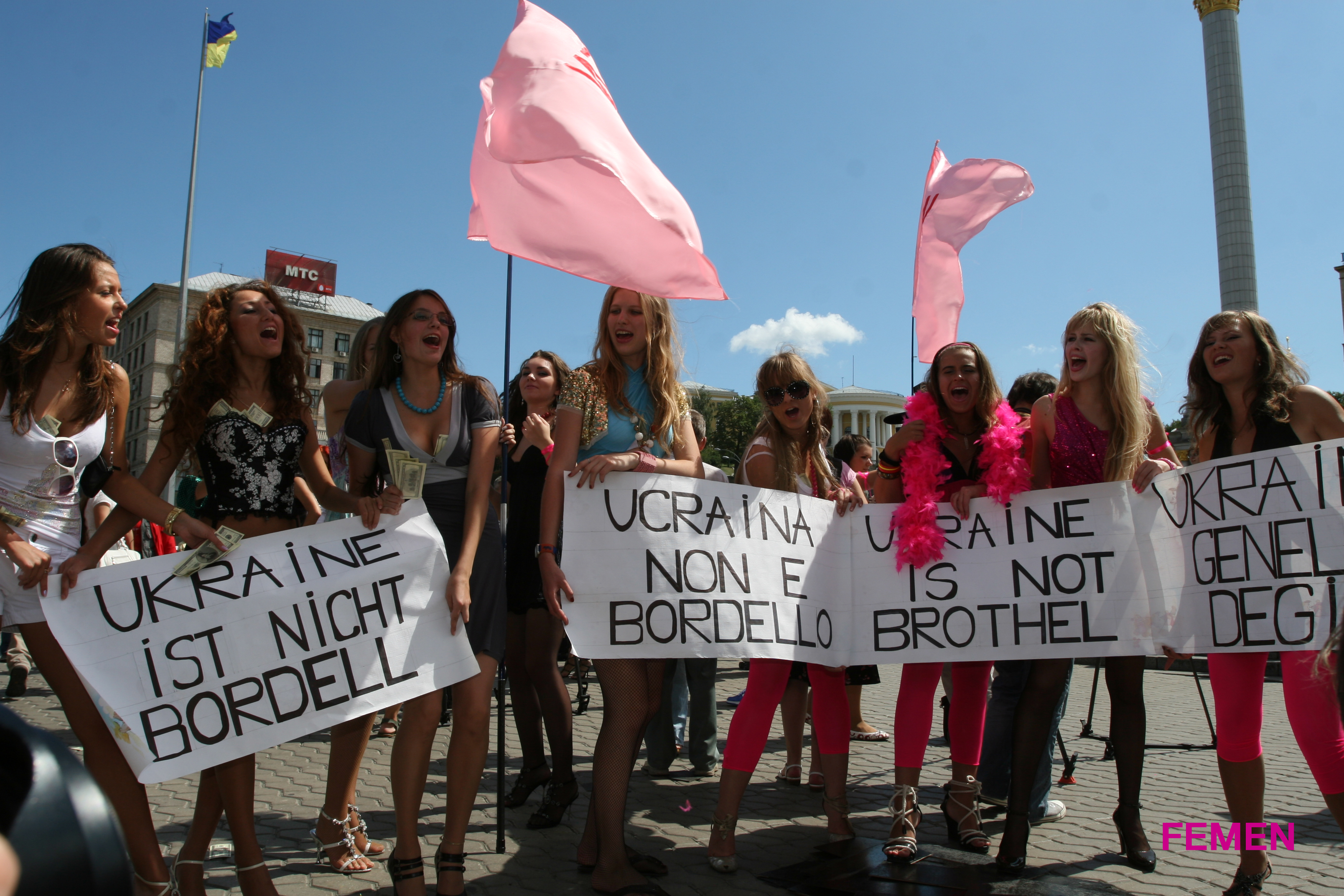
From the documentary "Ukraine Is Not a Brothel"

Prostitution in Ukraine is illegal but widespread and largely ignored by the government. In recent times, Ukraine has become a popular prostitution and sex trafficking destination. Ukraine is a source, transit, and destination country for women and children trafficked transnationally for the purposes of commercial sexual exploitation.

Ukraine's dissolution from the Soviet Union, saw the nation attempt to transition from a planned economy to a market economy. The transition process inflicted economic hardship in the nation, with nearly 80% of the population forced into poverty in the decade that followed its independence. Unemployment in Ukraine was growing at an increasing rate, with female unemployment rising to 64% by 1997. The economic decline in Ukraine made the nation vulnerable and forced many to depend on prostitution and trafficking as a source of income. Sex tourism rose as the country attracted greater numbers of foreign tourists.

UNAIDS estimated that there were around 86,600 sex workers in 2016, around 18 sex workers per 10,000 people.

== Domestic prostitution ==
According to the director of the Ukrainian Institute of Social Studies in 2011, there were 50,000 women working as prostitutes with between one out of six and one out of seven prostitutes being a minor. A 2020-2021 demographic survey of thousands of Ukrainians in sex work, conducted in various parts of the country, found a much lower proportion of minors: 95.6% of those in sex work in Ukraine were over 19, and only between 0.5% and 1.5% were minors.

In regards to trafficking, Ukrainian citizens make up 80% of traffickers with 60% being women. Sexual trafficking victims tend to be women and girls between the ages of seventeen and twenty-six.

The Russia-Ukraine war has reduced sex workers’ incomes and made it more difficult to provide support programs such as drug addiction treatment and HIV care. In 2022, 2,300 sex workers were registered in the city of Dnipro, but many more moved to the city to escape the intense fighting. Due to the war, fewer condoms were distributed. The spread of HIV is one of the main concerns.

== Exportation ==
Ukraine is now known to have a greater number of trafficking victims than any other Eastern European nation after the dissolution of the Soviet Union. In 1998, the Ukrainian Ministry of Interior estimated that 400,000 Ukrainian women were trafficked during the previous decade; other sources, such as non-governmental organizations, state the number was even higher. According to the International Organization for Migration over 500,000 Ukrainian women have been exploited with trafficking to the West since its independence in 1991 up to 1998.

Ukrainian women have been exported to countries across the world, such as Turkey, Greece, Cyprus, Italy, Spain, Hungary, United Arab Emirates, Syria etc. According to multiple reports the Ukrainian sex-workers are the largest group of foreign women in Turkey involved into prostitution and the second largest group of foreign women involved into prostitution outside the US military bases in Republic of Korea.

Of trafficking victims, 80% were unemployed prior to leaving Ukraine. Traffickers use this economic vulnerability to recruit women into prostitution. Many victims were convinced to leave Ukraine with the promise of profit by traffickers. The traffickers say they will work as dancers or in-store clerks. Victims are usually exported with legal documents such as travel visas. Ukrainian police say 70% of trafficked women travel with genuine documents obtained from corrupt officials. The majority of women cross the border with these genuine documents as opposed to being smuggled. Once they arrive in their destination country, they are frequently trapped by pimps taking away their visas, or by owing the pimps money to be paid off with prostitution. If they succeed in paying off their debt, some become recruiters, going back to Ukraine and telling friends and family they made a significant amount of money by going abroad. Approximately 60% of traffickers are Ukrainian women. While an IOM survey in 2011 says that 92% of Ukrainians were aware of sexual trafficking, trafficking continued to increase since then. Ukrainians working irregularly abroad increased from 28% to 41% from 2011 to 2015.

== Child prostitution ==
In Ukraine, children are often the victims of forced labor and other kind of sexual exploitations. The group most prone to prostitution are ones belonging to poor families, homeless children and orphans; the exposure of living on the streets without protection makes them the most vulnerable.

Ukraine experiences between 7000 and 8000 cases of sexual children exploitation per year. According to the IOM data, 10% of the 1355 Ukrainian victims of trafficking, were adolescents. Although child prostitution in Ukraine is illegal, a retrospective inquiry of adults shows that 20% of women and a 10% of men have experienced a sexual abuse by the age of 18.

== Health effects ==
HIV and AIDS are prominent in Ukraine with 1% of people aged 15–49 having HIV as of 2003. This gives Ukraine the highest rate of infection in Europe and the Commonwealth of Independent States.

HIV is contracted more frequently in people who do not use condoms during sex. In a study conducted in 2005, female sex workers knew sex without condoms increased the risk of HIV, but said they didn't always use condoms. Close to half of these workers said they would occasionally not use condoms if the client refused, if they were offered more money, and if the client was a frequent customer.

Female sex workers have less access to medical services which makes prevention and treatment more difficult to acquire. The social stigma and poverty that often accompany sex work also make it difficult to get prevention measures and treatment.

== Legal status ==
Map of Europe showing legal status of prostitution. Ukraine is in red, indicating illegal status

By law prostitution is illegal in Ukraine. While individual prostitution is not classified as a criminal offense, engagement in prostitution is an administrative offence in Ukraine as of 12 June 1987, when it was forbidden by Supreme Court of Ukraine and individuals are susceptible to a fine of ₴255 (approximately $10). However, there are other laws in place that aim to control pimping and the organization and operation of brothels. Article 303 in The Criminal Code of Ukraine addresses pimping and involvement in employment prostitution. It states that "involving or compelling a person to prostitution by deceit, blackmail, distress of the person concerned, or using violence or threats, thereof pimping is punishable by imprisonment for a term of three to five years" If this act is committed in respect to a group of individuals, the sentence extends to a term of four to seven years. Based on article 303, pimping of a minor (below 18 years) is a crime that is punishable by imprisonment of five to ten years. Pimping an underage minor( below 14 years) makes the term eight to fifteen years. Under Article 149 in The Criminal Code of Ukraine, which concerns trafficking of human beings, trafficking of individuals is punishable by law with imprisonment for a term of three to eight years, if it is in respect to a group of individuals the term is five to twelve years and if it involves a minor then the term is extended to fifteen years. On 12 January 2005 the Ukrainian parliament passed tougher criminal penalties for human trafficking and coerced prostitution. Prior to 2004 previous laws criminalising organised prostitution had little effect. Since then laws criminalising organised prostitution and penalties for human trafficking have had little effect owing to the relaxed implementation of these laws in the nation, with nearly 70% of convicted traffickers acquitted from imprisonment.

On 23 September 2015, Ukrainian MP Andriy Nemirovsky proposed a draft law that would legalize prostitution in Ukraine and would consider individual and organization that provides sexual services for money as entrepreneurs. The draft law also introduced regulation on the service such as age restrictions and medical condition.

On 24 February 2016, the Government of Ukraine launched its first National Action Plan that set down a framework for the implementation of United Nations Security Council Resolution 1325, which addresses the importance of women in the prevention and resolution in conflict. The action plan aims attention at the prevention of domestic violence and trafficking of women.

== Portrayal in media ==
The themes of prostitution and sex trafficking has been prominent in the Ukrainian media over the past few years. The UEFA Euro 2012 was heavily linked with prostitution and sex tourism in the country. There were efforts from the Ukrainian Ministry of Health and other political parties in favour of the legalization of prostitution in the lead up to the major sporting event, claiming that it would improve the prostitutes' working conditions, avoiding sexual transmitted diseases, and creating a new source of tax revenue.

Femen, the international movement of topless female activists, is an organization dedicated to feminism and sextremism. It originated in Ukraine and was the subject of Australian documentary Ukraine Is Not a Brothel. Their objective is to seek the extirpation of prostitution associated with exploitation of women and to create awareness against the act.

== See also ==
- Poverty in Ukraine
- Corruption in Ukraine
- Crime in Ukraine
- Human rights in Ukraine
- LGBT rights in Ukraine
- Sex tourism in Ukraine
- HIV/AIDS in Ukraine
- Street children in Ukraine
- Child prostitution in Ukraine
- Gender inequality in Ukraine
- Human trafficking in Ukraine
- Women's rights in Ukraine
- Violence against women in Ukraine
