= Street children in Ukraine =

Street children in Ukraine are underage individuals who live and survive in Ukrainian streets without attendance and care of adults. As a rule they are dwelling in landfills, public transit stations, junkyards, or under the bridges of major cities. The country's legal system defines the term "street children" as children who either left their family or have been abandoned by their parents. Violence against them is considered to be a widespread and serious national problem because in Ukraine they can become victims of commercial sexual exploitation, police violence, civil rights abuses and human trafficking.

== General background ==
In 1991 Ukraine proclaimed its independence after collapse of the Soviet Union. The process was followed by transition to free market economy and rapid social changes, like impoverishment of population, high unemployment, and subsequently — sky-rocketing juvenile delinquency, wide spread of street drugs and adolescent suicides during the mid-1990s.

Living on the streets exposes the youngsters to a wide number of risk factors, and due to their effect the great part of the infants falls behind in the schooling. The main risks of street life in Ukraine are physical and sexual violence, drug abuse, malnutrition, police abuse and harassment, risky sexual activity, forced sex, unintended pregnancy, and different kinds of infections, like HIV, tuberculosis, STDs and hepatitis. The risks contribute to the psychological and emotional condition of the street youngsters instigating among them traumatism, depressions, sense of isolation, and insufficient self-esteem. In addition, their opportunities to make a living are very limited by beggary, collection of empty bottles and so on. As a result their everyday surviving can be characterized as deviation from the ethical norms of the civil society since the street children tend to be inclined to criminal activities (theft, robbery and property damage), vagrancy, substance abuse and prostitution regardless of their gender. It was reported that the use of drugs among Ukrainian homeless minors acquired a special meaning of symbolic ritual. In order to strengthen their subgroup solidarity they have developed a ceremony to inject a so called baltrushka (mixture of vinegar, water and flu medicine) up to six times a day. Another popular method of drug taking in Ukraine is inhaling glue. The uncontrolled use of injection drugs, sharing needles and unprotected sex make the street children extremely vulnerable to HIV.

The spread of HIV among the Ukrainian street children attracted a lot of special research interest due to their way of life. The available data show that the street children and youth of the major cities make up about 33 % of total population at risk. Testing of HIV samples collected in different Ukrainian cities demonstrates that HIV prevalence among street children may be as high as 50 %. According to the obtained data around 15.5% of street minors in Ukraine used the injected drugs at least once, 9.8% of boys reported anal sex experience when only 36 % of them acknowledged using condom during their most recent sexual encounter.

An access of the street minors to public health services in Ukraine is a serious problem too due to cumbersome bureaucratic protocol and negative attitude of the medical personnel to the homeless people. Some providers of the health services may refuse to treat them or provide just a limited treatment only in life-threatening condition. Ukrainian Police for Minors treats the street children as "potential criminals". The police attitude towards the youngsters may include sexual harassment and physical violence. According to some reports around 75 % of the Ukrainian street children have experienced a harassment from the police and 41 % have been harassed more than three times in the past year.

== Available statistics ==
Unfortunately, official data about a total number of street children in Ukraine are not available. As a result, there is a huge range of different evaluations between 30,000 and 300,000. An assessment of Ukrainian Ministry of Health indicated that there is around 115,000 of adolescents aged 10—18 who need a protection. Nevertheless, there is no doubts that their number went up significantly during last 17 years. As of 2003, the Ukrainian government estimated their number of 50,000 using data collected from street shelters. A main factor, which pushes the minors to the street life is an extreme poverty of Ukrainian population. The adults has to work longer hours or seek for employment in neighbor countries, while their children are being left unattended. Other factors are widespread alcoholism and substance abuse, physical or sexual violence and ignoring the parenting responsibilities within their families. A survey of Ukrainian children in the age before 15 demonstrated that around 66 % of them used to live with an alcoholic or illegal drug user, 60 % have separated or divorced parents, 54 % witnessed violence of intimate partner, around 50% experienced violence against themselves, 41 % lived with ex-prisoners of Ukrainian penitentiary system, 38 % lived with someone who was mentally sick or tried to commit suicide.

== See also ==
- Gender inequality in Ukraine
- Human trafficking in Ukraine
- Prostitution in Ukraine
- Violence against women in Ukraine
