= Operation Blue Orchid =

Joint operation of United States-Russian against child pornography

- Operation name: Operation Blue Orchid
- Type: Child pornography crackdown

Participants
- Executed by: United States, Russia

Mission
- Target: associated users associated with website Blue Orchid
- Objective: To round up and prosecute suspects named

Timeline
- Date executed: May 2000

Results
- Arrests: 4 Americans, 5 Russians

Operation Blue Orchid was a joint United States-Russian operation to dismantle an online child pornography ring, centering on the website Blue Orchid. It began in May 2000, after an informant in a separate child pornography case came forward with information about the Blue Orchid site. The website, which showed depictions of rape, contained videos of Russian boys aged eight being abused, selling such videos for around $300 each.

The investigation included U.S. Customs officials allegedly buying one of the videos from the website. The operation led to the arrest of four Americans and five Russians, including Vsevolod Solntsev-Elbe, creator and business manager of the Blue Orchid website. It was seen as a success – particularly for international cooperation – and led Charles Winwood, acting commissioner in US Customs, to say "Operation Blue Orchid demonstrates that there really are no borders when it comes to our mutual interest in protecting children".

== Background ==
The investigation began in May 2000 when Moscow City Police, after receiving training from the U.S. Customs CyberSmuggling Center in Fairfax, Virginia (funded by the U.S. Department of State), sought assistance from U.S. authorities to investigate the Blue Orchid website. The site, allegedly operated by Russians Sergey Garbko and Vsevolod Solntsev-Elbe, depicted the sexual and physical abuse of children, primarily young boys from Novokuybyshevsk, Russia. The victims, often from homeless or troubled families, were exploited in films such as the "Russian Flowers" series and "Thief's Punishment I and II," which featured graphic abuse and sadomasochistic content.

== Investigation and arrests ==
The U.S. Customs CyberSmuggling Center conducted an undercover purchase, leading to the identification of suspects in Russia. In December 2000, Moscow police arrested Vsevolod Solntsev-Elbe and seized 400 videotapes, duplication equipment, and sales records from his residence. Elbe admitted to transporting a 13-year-old boy for exploitation. Further arrests in Russia included Victor Razumov ("The Punisher") on March 2, 2001, charged with abusing a 15-year-old boy during video production.

In the United States, leads from the Moscow raid identified customers, including Glenn Martikean. On January 26, 2001, U.S. Customs searched Martikean’s home in Portage, Indiana, seizing evidence. Martikean was arrested on January 31, 2001, upon returning from Russia, where he allegedly sought to engage in child sex tourism. He was indicted on March 23, 2001, for importing child pornography and interstate travel for illegal sexual activity. By March 26, 2001, the operation had resulted in four U.S. arrests, 15 search warrants, and five arrests in Russia.

== Impact ==
The operation extended beyond the U.S. and Russia, with leads sent to Sweden, Denmark, the Netherlands, and other European nations, sparking further investigations. Blue Orchid customers wired payments of $200-$300 per video, with most shipments directed to the U.S. The network’s shutdown marked the third child pornography ring dismantled by U.S. Customs and Moscow police, following earlier successes like the arrest of Dmitry Kuznetsov in 2000.

== See also ==
- 2004 Ukrainian child pornography raids
- Operation Hamlet
- Operation Ore
