= Operation Hamlet =

Danish-American joint law enforcement operation against child pornography

- Operation name: Operation Hamlet
- Type: Child pornography crackdown

Participants
- Planned by: United States, Denmark
- Executed by: United States

Mission
- Target: global network of pedophiles involved in the sexual molestation of children and the distribution of child pornography over the Internet
- Objective: To round up and prosecute suspects named

Timeline
- Date begin: November 2001
- Date end: August 9, 2002

Results
- Arrests: 10 in the US, 10 in Europe

Operation Hamlet was a multinational law enforcement investigation targeting a global network of pedophiles involved in the sexual molestation of children and the distribution of child pornography over the Internet. Led by the U.S. Customs Service in collaboration with the Danish National Police (DNP) and other international agencies, the operation resulted in the rescue of 45 children worldwide, including 37 in the United States, and the arrest of numerous suspects across multiple countries.

== Background ==
The investigation began in November 2001 when the Danish National Police (DNP) requested assistance from the U.S. Customs Service following a tip from "Save the Children," an Internet watchdog group. The group had discovered photographs online depicting a man sexually abusing a young girl. Danish authorities arrested the man and his wife after determining that they had posted images of their nine-year-old daughter being molested and shared them with individuals in other countries, including the United States.

The U.S. Customs CyberSmuggling Center took the lead in coordinating the U.S. investigative efforts, working closely with the DNP, the U.S. Customs Attaché in Berlin, INTERPOL, the National Center for Missing and Exploited Children, and various federal, state, and local law enforcement agencies. The operation uncovered a sprawling network of individuals exchanging child pornography and, in many cases, directly abusing children, including their own.

== Timeline ==
On August 8, 2002, 15 suspects were indicted on federal conspiracy charges in the Eastern District of California, with five of them being foreign nationals. The operation saw the execution of 15 search warrants in the United States, leading to the arrest of 10 U.S. citizens. Globally, 20 arrests were made, with additional suspects apprehended in Denmark, Belgium, Germany, England, Switzerland, and the Netherlands.

Commissioner of Customs Robert C. Bonner announced the results of Operation Hamlet in Washington, D.C., praising the investigators for their "ingenuity and perseverance" in bringing the perpetrators to justice.

Operation Hamlet involved a series of coordinated enforcement actions across multiple U.S. states, including California, Idaho, Nevada, Florida, New York, Washington, New Jersey, Michigan, South Carolina, Illinois, and Texas. Notable arrests and actions included:

- January 26, 2002: U.S. Customs agents and Clovis Police Department officers in Fresno, California arrested a suspect who had exchanged child pornography with another couple in the ring. The suspect faced charges of child molestation and related offenses.
- January 27, 2002: In San Diego, California, U.S. Customs agents and the Internet Crimes Against Children Task Force arrested a child counselor on charges of child molestation and distribution of child pornography.
- February 15, 2002: An advertising salesman in San Diego was arrested on similar charges of child molestation and distribution of child pornography.
- February 15, 2002: In Burley, Idaho, a suspect operating a photography business used to produce child pornography was arrested by U.S. Customs agents and Cassia County Sheriff's Office detectives.
- February 15, 2002: In Reno, Nevada, a suspect committed suicide before formal charges could be filed following the execution of a search warrant revealing evidence of child molestation.
- February 24, 2002: A suspect in Longview, Texas was arrested by U.S. Customs agents, the Harrison County Sheriff's Office, and the Texas Department of Public Safety on charges of sexually assaulting a child under 13.
- March 11, 2002: In Palm Beach Gardens, Florida, a suspect was arrested on charges of child molestation and the manufacture and distribution of child pornography.
- March 12, 2002: A federal arrest warrant was issued for a suspect in Longview, Texas on child pornography charges.
- March 13, 2002: In Killeen, Texas, a suspect posing as a teenage girl online to solicit child molestation images was arrested and later sentenced to 20 years in prison on July 10, 2002.
- May 9, 2002: A suspect in Spokane, Washington was arrested on child sexual exploitation charges and pleaded guilty on August 1, 2002.

== Global impact ==
In addition to the U.S. arrests, 10 suspects were apprehended in Europe, including Denmark, Belgium, Germany, England, Switzerland, and the Netherlands. The operation dismantled a significant portion of the child exploitation ring, rescuing 45 children from ongoing abuse. Of particular note was the involvement of parents in majority of the cases (80%) of the molestation of their own children, a disturbing trend uncovered during the investigation.

== See also ==
- 2004 Ukrainian child pornography raids
- Operation Blue Orchid
- Operation Ore
