= Child prostitution in Ukraine =

Child prostitution in Ukraine has been described by Juan Miguel Petit, Special Rapporteur on the Sale of Children, Child Prostitution and Child Pornography for the United Nations, as a major problem in the country.

A research publication "2016 Findings on the Worst Forms of Child Labor" prepared by Bureau of International Labor Affairs reports that the Ukrainian children engage in the worst forms of child labor including production of pornography and sex work. Orphaned, homeless, and street children are trafficked both domestically and transnationally. In the past the majority of prostitutes were girls from urban districts. Now most victims of child prostitution in Ukraine come from small towns and rural regions, and prostitution of Ukrainian boys has increased.

The Ukrainian legal system does not provide a clear definition for "prostitution" and "child prostitution". It levies a harsh punishment for the involvement of children into commercial sex work, but their clients are often not prosecuted. As a result, the children become liable for their own exploitation.

== Social and economic background ==
Ukrainian independence in 1991 brought to the nation all kinds of freedom and high aspirations of a bright economic future. However, by 2005, Ukraine plunged into a first economic crisis which quickly spread across the country hitting the most vulnerable groups of society hard. After the first wave of economic issues, the local data demonstrated a short recovery in 2006, but this was just a preface of system crises of 2008. Economy of Ukraine faced the crises being under pressure of financial debts, high inflation, unstable national currency and ubiquitous corruption.

The bad economic situation of 2008 was aggravated by accumulated social problems, like poor education, inappropriate healthcare and unfavorable demography. The absence of systematic and consistent reforms in Ukraine led to a wasting of huge budget spent for social programs. As a result, the Ukrainian society experiences a high level of poverty, inequality of opportunities and uneven access of people to different public services.

This socio-economic strain has had profound impacts on Ukrainian households. Subsequently, a number of divorces is growing and single parent family is becoming more and more common in Ukraine, also the situation has a negative impact on children and enhances a problem of child poverty. In poor families children experience a higher risk of being involved in criminal activity, prostitution and vagrancy.

== General overview ==
According to Ukrainian media the country along with Moldova and Portugal became a European center of child sex tourism. With respect to the situation Mark Capaldi, ECPAT's head of policy and research, expressed a concern that the countries "see tourism as a fantastic economic development sector" ignoring the risks which international tourists impend to the children.

The sexual exploitation of children is most obvious in Kyiv and some other big cities such as Odesa, Kharkiv and Sevastopol. Many children are forced to migrate there to get education and then they are getting involved into Ukrainian sex industry to support themselves financially. An involvement of Ukrainian adolescent boys into prostitution has risen a number of special concerns.

There is a consistent trend of human trafficking from Ukraine, especially women and children. International Organization for Migration reports that Ukraine became one of the major sources of minors and females for their forced sexual exploitation; as a rule they are sold to Balkans, Central Europe and Middle East. An average price of Ukrainian girl is around $2,000 — $10,000 depending on her destination. In Israel a Ukrainian youngster may earn up to $50,000 — $100,000 annually for her pimp and have nothing left for herself. According to the available statistics the number of Ukrainian children involved in prostitution is growing both domestically and abroad. UN Special Rapporteur on the Sale of Children, Child Prostitution and Child Pornography Juan Miguel Petit concluded that the human trafficking and commercial exploitation of children are major problems in the country. After his visit to Ukraine he filed a special report to the UN Human Rights Committee, which says that 10% of the victims of human trafficking are aged between 13 and 18. Children of Ukraine are being exploited in different businesses for example as servants, in street trading, and to provide sex services. A typical model of the human trafficking in Ukraine is that the children are becoming victims of sexual exploitation residing within their country. In the majority of the incidents the Ukrainian criminals lure the potential victims into debt and then force them become prostitutes.

Citizens of the country have been reported to be involved in the production of child pornography, with some entities masquerading as "Child Model Agencies". A significant instance of this was exposed during the 2004 Ukrainian child pornography raids, where a modeling agency operating in the major cities was found to be involved in the production and distribution of child pornography under the guise of a legitimate business. There is a connection between child trafficking and child pornography production, with instances of children being trafficked from neighboring countries within the CIS countries for such purposes.

== Available data and statistics ==
A 2001 study performed by the Ukrainian Institute for Social Research demonstrated that 11% of Ukrainian women who provide sexual services are aged between 12 and 15 years old, 20% of Ukrainian prostitutes are from 16 to 17 years old. In some registered cases the age of Ukrainian girls involved in prostitution was as low as 10 years old.

More recent studies show a massive decline in the incidence of prostituted children among Ukrainians involved in sex work. A 2020-2021 demographic survey of thousands of Ukrainians in sex work, conducted in various parts of the country, found that 95.6% were over 19, and only between 0.5% and 1.5% were minors.

A 2021 demographic study of 560 sex workers from Dnipro also attested to declining rights of minors involved in prostitution, with over 75% of sex workers being 22 or older and 93% having completed high school (the 7% of those who did not have high school degrees included both prostituted minors and adult sex workers who never graduated). However, the study still found girls as young as 14 who were being prostituted, attesting to the ongoing problem of child-sex trafficking in Ukraine.

There is no data about the age when Ukrainian children enter the sex industry, but there are some statistical data indicating that the average age of "sexual debut" in Ukraine is declining. In general it has dropped to 15–16 years, but for many situations it might be as low as 9–10 years. As to Ukrainian boys, it was reported that 3% of them had their first sexual experience at the age 11 or even earlier. Also a survey of Ukrainian children in the age group of 11-years old has shown that 21% of boys and 5% of girls admitted that they already had their first sexual contact.

According to ECPAT, a sex culture generational gap may be affecting the age of 'sexual debut', citing mass communication and the influence of Western consumerism as possible factors.

== See also ==
- Gender inequality in Ukraine
- Human trafficking in Ukraine
- Prostitution in Ukraine
- 2004 Ukrainian child pornography raids
