= Incarceration in Ukraine =

Incarceration is one of the criminal punishments in Ukraine provided for in the Criminal Code of Ukraine.

== Use of punishment ==
Incarceration is provided for by law for most criminal offenses as a required and/or discretionary punishment. Any person, regardless of status, age, sex, or other category, may be imprisoned.

A sentence of incarceration may be for between 1 and 15 years, or for the remainder of the offender's life If two or more offenses or consecutive sentences are handed down in one case, the period of determinate imprisonment can be increased to 25 years. Depending on the maximum period of incarceration (along with certain amounts of fines after 17 January 2012), crimes may be classified as "non-grave" crimes (up to 5 years), grave crimes (up to 10 years), or special grave crimes (more than 10 years, as well as sentences of life imprisonment). Incarceration cannot be imposed for misdemeanors. Reduced terms of incarceration apply to minors.

The term of pre-trial detention is 12 months for felonies and 6 months for petty crimes.

== Types of prison colonies ==
There are three types of colonies: minimum security level, medium security level, and maximum security level. Minors serve sentences in educational colonies (Ukrainian: виховна колонія). In these colonies, areas of quarantine, diagnostics and distribution, resocialization, and intensified supervision are organised. They differ as to living conditions. Depending on the behaviour of a convicted person, he can be moved from one type of colony to another.

== See also ==
- Prisons in Ukraine
