= Crime in Ukraine =

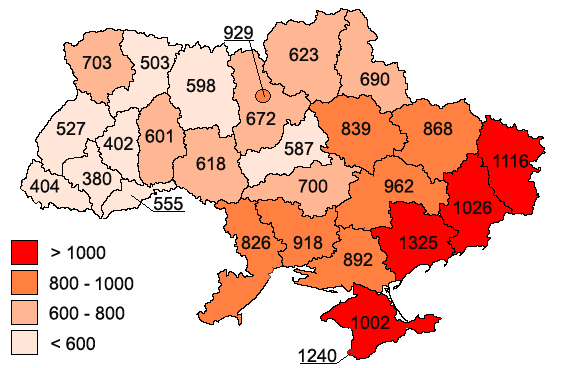
The number of registered crimes per Ukrainian Oblast in 2008

The fight against crime in Ukraine is led by the Ukrainian Police and certain other agencies. Due to the hard economic situation in the 1990s, the crime rate rose steadily to a peak in 2000. Following this peak, the crime rate declined, until 2009. In that year, the 2008 financial crisis reached Ukraine.

== Statistics ==
year	crimes	victims	grave crimes	underage crimes	murders	prisoners
2010	500 902	321 228	178 947	17 342	2 356	147 716
2011	515 833	343 159	171 119	17 846	2 506	154 027
2012	443 665	302 563	145 733	14 238	2 261	154 029
2013	563 560	426 651	156 131	8 781	1 955	147 112
2014	529 139	393 532	154 216	7 467	4 389	126 937
2015	565 182	412 689	177 855	7 171	3 004	73 431
2016	592 604	444 617	213 521	5 230	1 726	69 997
2017	523 911	374 238	198 074	5 608	1 551	60 399
2018	487 133	344 780	167 986	4 750	1 508	57 100
2019	444 130	301 792	140 468	4 088	1 428	55 078
2020	360 622					
2021	321 443					
2022	362 636					
2023	475 595					
2024	492 479					

Comparison of major crime indicators per 100 000 population, 2019.

country	murder rate	incarceration rate
Ukraine	3.4	131
Poland	0.7	179
Germany	0.9	63
Greece	0.9	108
Russia	5.4	316

== Crime by type ==
=== Murder ===
In 2010, Ukraine had a murder rate of 4.3 per 100,000 of population. There were a total of 1,988 murders in Ukraine in 2010. In 2017, 0.3% of Ukrainian crime was homicide. In 2016 the Ukrainian police investigated 1,707 murders and, in 2017, 1,397.

=== Corruption ===
Corruption is a widespread and growing problem in Ukrainian society. In 2014's Transparency International Corruption Perceptions Index, Ukraine was ranked 142nd out of the 175 countries investigated (tied with Uganda and the Comoros).

Bribes are given to ensure that public services are delivered either in time or at all. Ukrainians have stated they give bribes because they think it is customary and expected. According to a 2008 Management Systems International (MSI) sociological survey, the highest corruption levels were found in vehicle inspection (57.5%), the police (54.2%), health care (54%), the courts (49%) and higher education (43.6%). On 8 June 2011, Ukrainian President Viktor Yanukovych stated that corruption costs the state budget US$2.5 billion in revenues annually and that, through corrupt dealings in public procurement, 10 to 15% (US$7.4 billion) of the state budget "ends up in the pockets of officials".

According to the United States Agency for International Development (USAID), the main causes of corruption in Ukraine are a weak justice system and an over-controlling, non-transparent government combined with business-political ties and a weak civil society. Corruption is regularly discussed in the Ukrainian media.

In May 2018, Estonian President Kersti Kaljulaid stated that corruption is the primary factor holding back the development of Ukraine and that it can only be resolved with a strong political will, after a meeting with the head of the National Anti-Corruption Bureau of Ukraine (NABU), Artem Sytnyk.

=== Theft ===
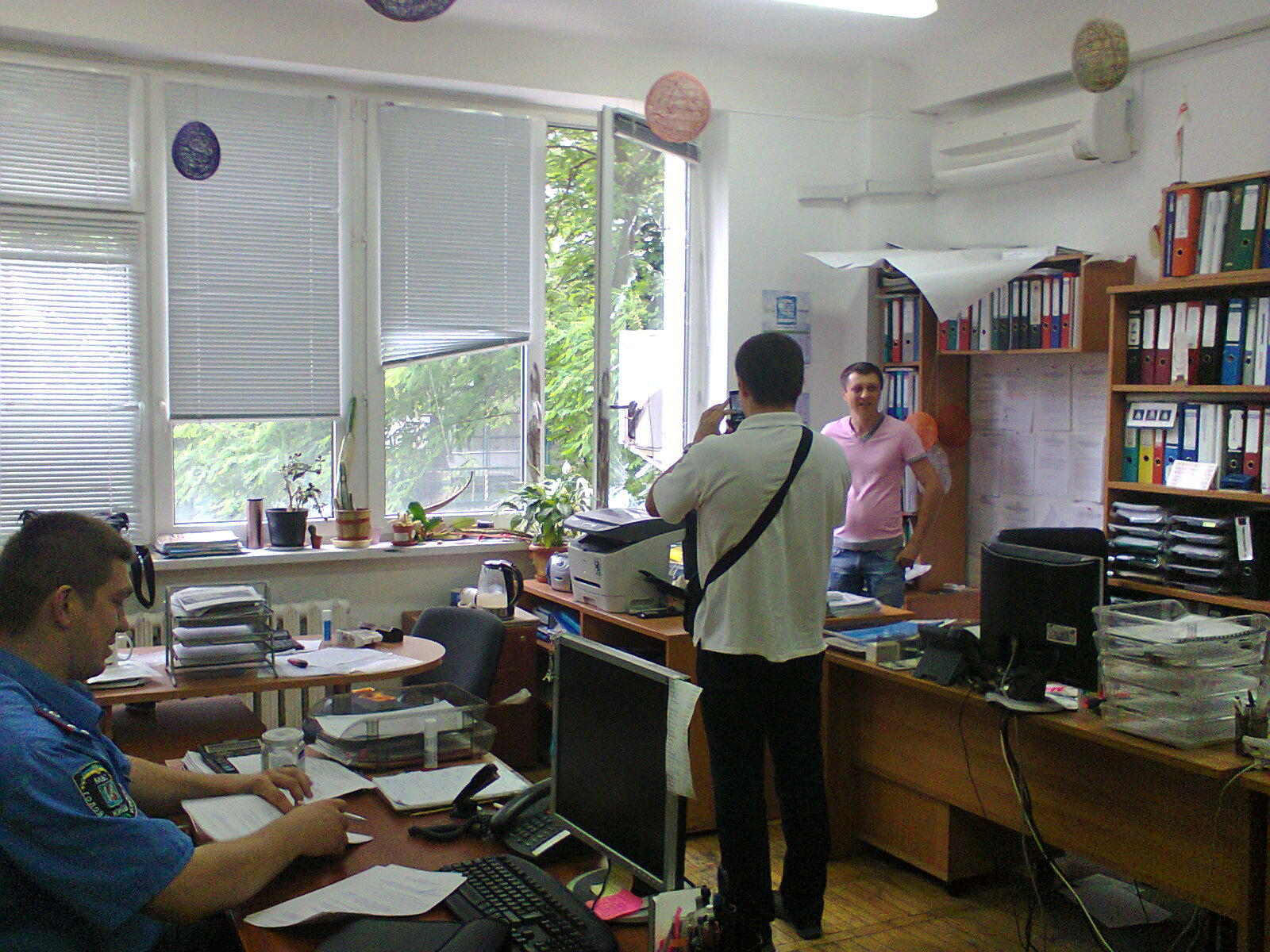
Kyiv police investigating a burglary in May 2014

In 2017, the main segment of crime was theft, representing a 52% proportion of the total crimes in Ukraine.

=== Terrorism ===
According to official statistics there were 126 acts of terror on Ukrainian soil every month in 2014, 108 in 2015, 155 in 2016 and 124 in 2017.

From 2014 until late 2017, 5,804 criminal cases were registered as 'acts of terror', or 129 terrorist attacks per month, on average. In this time-frame, 15 persons were convicted on charges of terrorism.

== See also ==
- Judicial system of Ukraine
- Prisons in Ukraine
- Human trafficking in Ukraine
- Thief in law
- Ukrainian mafia

== Sources ==
- Kobelyanska, Larysa (2000). "Violence and Trafficking in Women in Ukraine". Making the Transition Work for Women in Europe and Central Asia. World Bank Publications. ISBN 0-8213-4662-8.
- Lucas, Brian (2017). "Gender and conflict in Ukraine" (PDF). www.gsdrc.org. K4D Knowledge, Evidence and Learning for Development.
