= 2004 Ukrainian child pornography raids =

Child pornography crackdowns in Ukraine

- Date: July 2004
- Location: Kyiv, Kharkiv, Simferopol in Ukraine

The 2004 Ukrainian child pornography raids occurred a few months before the First Orange Revolution, when police in Ukraine raided a softcore child pornography ring operating in the cities of Kyiv, Kharkiv, and Simferopol. The ring had operated since 2001 and used a modeling agency as a front.

== Background ==
Operating predominantly in Kyiv with branches in cities like Kharkiv and Simferopol, the agency, named "Alex Model" (Ukrainian: Алекс-Модел), was identified as one of the major producers and distributors of child pornographic content, which was branded under several names throughout the world using the "LS" abbreviation as LS-Models, LS-Magazine, LS-Girls, LS-Studio, LS-Island, LS-Land, LS-Dreams, and LSMODELCLUB (LS Model Club). The leaders attracted minors with the prospect of modeling opportunities, only to involve them in illicit activities.

The agency's operations spanned several cities in Ukraine. They would regularly advertise on TV, in local newspapers, and on the radio, calling for children with a "model appearance." Parents, believing in opportunities for their children, brought in their kids, and the agency's workers would create explicit content.

It is believed the agency lured approximately 1,500 girls between 8 and 16 years of age. The agency had many branches located throughout Ukraine, in particular in Kyiv, Kharkiv, and Simferopol. The images of minors were then disseminated predominantly on foreign internet websites to consumers in the United States, Canada, and Australia, among others.

== Discovery and investigation ==
The first police report for the agency was received by the Crimean police in 2004 from a resident of Simferopol. Law enforcement started surveillance and collected information, and officers identified about 40 people involved in this case in one way or another.

The operations of the Kyiv-based porn studio came to an end when law enforcement agencies stopped its operations. As part of the subsequent investigation, the Alex Model agency in Kharkiv was discovered.

Sergei Bakaev, head of the department for combating crimes related to human trafficking, emphasized the manipulative strategies used by the agency to exploit children. They deceived parents by presenting the façade of a legitimate modeling business, showing them reputable magazines with children on the covers, and promising similar opportunities for their kids.

In reality, the agency psychologically manipulated the children, coaxing them into explicit photoshoots under the guise of changing outfits or playing games, ensuring that most of the young victims were oblivious to the exploitative nature of the activities.

Simultaneously, in Australia, over 150 individuals were arrested on charges of possession and distribution of child pornography. The origins of some of the materials were traced back to Eastern Europe and Russia. This international crackdown was part of a US-led international campaign against child pornography, which started its investigations in March 2004.

The mastermind behind the "Alex Model" agency was 25-year-old Alexander N. (Ukrainian: Александру Н.; Александра Чурсина) from Kyiv, who was arrested, and a criminal case for distributing child pornography was initiated against him. Other members of the group remained wanted. Investigations revealed that the parents of the exploited children were paid anywhere between 50 and 200 hryvnia per hour of shooting, with the company's monthly net income estimated at $100,000.

== Raids and collaboration ==
The Crime Investigation Department of the Ministry for the Interior conducted the raids. The deputy head of the department, Vitaly Yarema, said that the bank accounts of the agency, containing hundreds of thousands of dollars, had been frozen. Profits of the agency amounted to millions of dollars.

The raids were conducted after a joint investigation between Ukrainian police and Interpol. Subsequently, after initial raids, several other child pornography studios were closed in Dnipropetrovsk, Donetsk, Luhansk, and Lviv. In 2005, the United States Department of State announced that there was further cooperation between Ukrainian police and other law enforcement agencies internationally.

The investigation following the raids was completed by 6 April 2005.

== Outcome ==
In 2005, according to Part 3 of Art. 301 of the Criminal Code of Ukraine ("import, manufacture, sale and distribution of pornographic items"), the organizer of the agency "Alex Model" faced a sentence of 3 to 7 years in prison.

Despite extensive surveillance and eventually the arrest of various "Alex Model" employees across Ukraine, the legal outcome was lenient. Most involved were given suspended sentences. Alexander N. was held for several months in a pre-trial detention center and was released.

== See also ==
- Child prostitution in Ukraine
- Human trafficking in Ukraine
