= HIV/AIDS in Ukraine =

Epidemic in the country

The HIV/AIDS epidemic in Ukraine is one of the fastest-growing epidemics in the world. Ukraine has one of the highest rates of increase of HIV/AIDS cases in Eastern Europe and highest HIV prevalence outside Africa. Experts estimated in August 2010 that 1.3 percent of the adult population of Ukraine was infected with HIV, the highest in all of Europe. Late 2011 Ukraine numbered 360,000 HIV-positive persons (increase in the rate close to zero compared with 2010). Between 1987 and late 2012 27,800 Ukrainians died of AIDS. In 2012 tests revealed 57 new cases of HIV positive Ukrainians each day and 11 daily AIDS-related deaths (on a population of roughly 45 million at the time).

Identified in the Ukrainian SSR in 1987, HIV/AIDS appeared to be confined to a small population until the mid-1990s, when a sudden and explosive epidemic emerged among injecting drug users and prostitutes against the background of severe economic crisis and collapse of social healthcare system. According to data reported in 2015 the epidemic is still on the rise, but it doesn't limit itself by a small group of drug users and appears to be accelerated within all parts of Ukrainian population with growing numbers of infected women. Ukraine has one of the highest rates of increase of HIV/AIDS cases in Eastern Europe and highest adult HIV prevalence outside Africa.

== Situation ==
=== Spread of AIDS ===
HIV officially reached the territory of the former Soviet Union in 1987, about 5 years after the virus itself was discovered. Until 1995 there were only a few known cases of HIV infections in Ukraine. The country was therefore deemed to be "low risk" by the World Health Organization (WHO) in terms of spread at that time. Between 1987 and 1994, 183 infections were reported.

In the mid-1990s, the transmission was primarily through injecting drug use. By 2001, however, the proportion of new cases of HIV/AIDS attributable to injecting drug use had declined to 57% from 84% in 1997. During that time, heterosexual transmission increased from 11% to 27%, and perinatal transmission increased from 2% to 13% as a proportion of total cases.

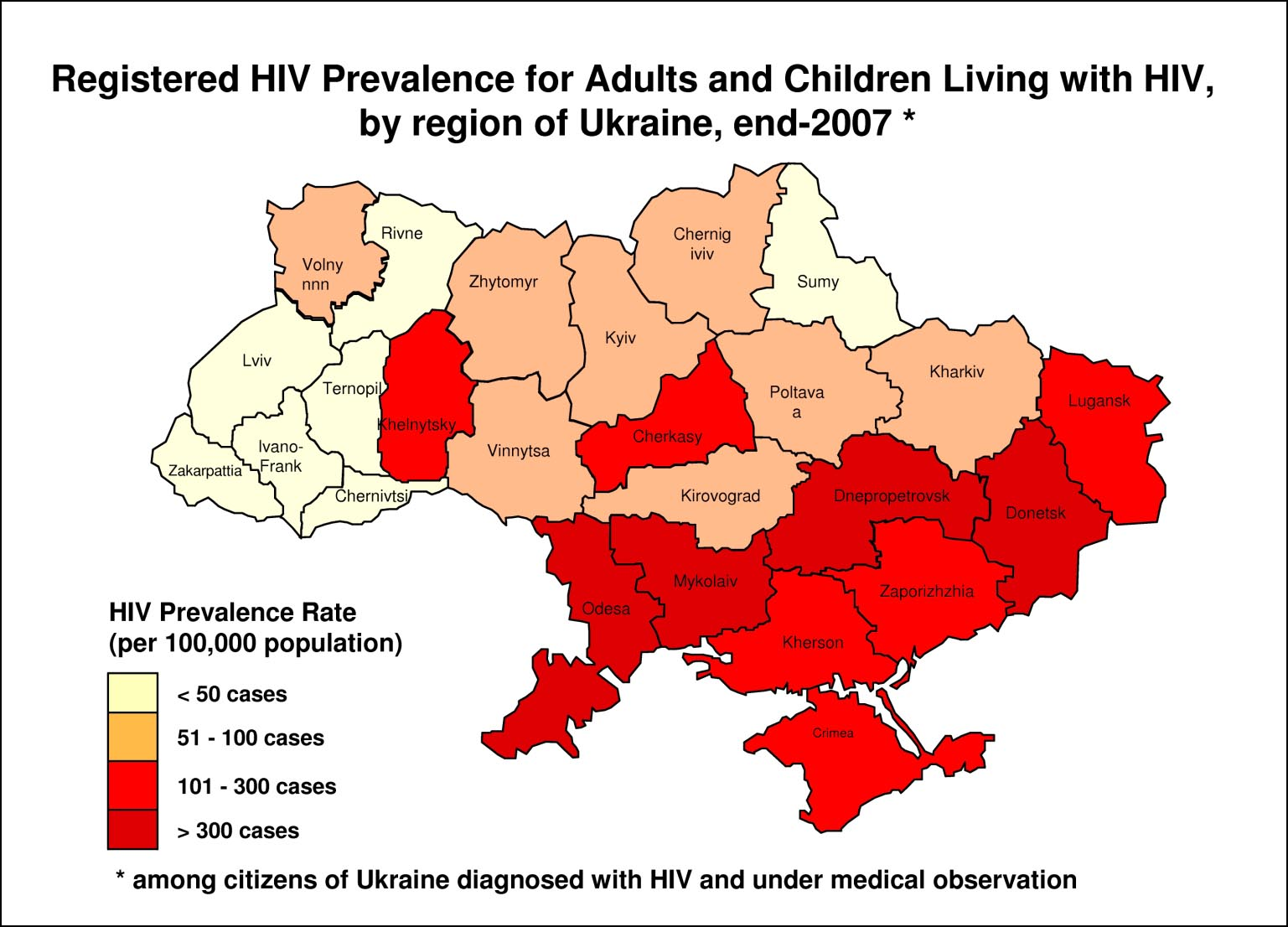
Registered HIV prevalence in Ukraine (late 2007)

UNAIDS estimates that the number of people infected with HIV/AIDS in 2003 was 360,000 (range 180,000 to 590,000), representing an adult prevalence of 1.4%. According to the Ministry of Health—which estimates that by 2002 there were more than 500,000 people infected or nearly 2% of the adult population—the epidemic has now spread to every oblast in the country. Prevalence in the southern and eastern oblasts (Odesa, Mykolaiv, Dnipropetrovsk, and Donetsk) is about three times higher than rates in the rest of the country. A major reason for this is the fact that the urbanized and industrialized regions in the East and South of Ukraine suffered most from the economic crisis in the 90s, which in turn led to the spread of unemployment, alcoholism, and drug abuse, thus setting the conditions for wider spread of the epidemic.

From 1995 to 2007, the primary means of HIV transmission was through injection drug use, but by 2008, sexual contact outpaced injection drug use as the primary form of transmission. By 2009, almost 44 percent of new infections occurred through sexual transmission, and 36 percent were through injecting drug use (according to USAID; according to CSIS in 2009 the proportion of new cases of HIV/AIDS attributable to injecting drug use was 60%).

In 2007 about 0.96 percent of Ukrainians, or about 440,000 citizens, were estimated to be living with HIV/AIDS, down from 1.46 percent of the population in 2005, or 685,600 citizens, according to UNAIDS. The number of HIV/AIDS cases in Ukraine reduced by 200 or 3.9% to 4,900 in the period of January–November 2008, compared with the corresponding period of last year. In 2007 the majority of those infected where under 30 years of age; with a full 25% of those affected still in their teens.

Although HIV/AIDS had remained concentrated among marginalized and vulnerable populations, it was feared in 2008 it may be spreading to the general population. According to the Ministry of Health, Ukraine has already surpassed the “optimistic” projections of an HIV/AIDS rate of 2% in 2010.

According to the Health Ministry of Ukraine the HIV infection rate fell by 6.7% and mortality from AIDS was down by 7.9% in 2014.

=== Prisons ===
Between 1996 and 2001 about 26 percent in various prisons across Ukraine tested HIV- positive. In a January 2005 study between 15 and 30 percent of prisoners tested HIV- positive.

Early 2005 rates of up to 95 percent of the prisoners were found Hepatitis C positive.

Early 2010 there were over 147,000 people held at prisons and more than 38,000 at pre-trial detention facilities in Ukraine.

=== Spread of AIDS among children ===
The number of children with AIDS in Ukraine is on the rise since the number of mothers with HIV grows by 20-30% annually. According to the United Nations, the number of pregnant women with HIV was 0.34% in 2007, which was the highest index in Europe. According to the United Nations, of nearly 18,000 children born by HIV-positive mothers in Ukraine, 10,200 children have not contracted HIV and another 5,500 children under eighteen months have yet to receive final results of an examination. In Ukraine, 1,877 children have been confirmed as HIV positive and 244 have died of AIDS. The United Nations notes that the program of preventing mother-to-child transmission of HIV in Ukraine has cut the share of such transmission from 27% of the number of HIV cases in 2000 to 7% in 2006. According to the Health Ministry of Ukraine the HIV transmission from mother to a child was 4.28% in 2014 compared to 29% in 2004.

The spread of HIV among the Ukrainian street children attracted a lot of special research interest due to their risky way of life. According to the obtained data around 15.5% of street minors in Ukraine used the injected drugs at least once, 9.8% of boys reported anal sex experience when only 36% of them acknowledged using condom during their most recent sexual encounter.

== Preventive measures ==
From 2001 to June 2015, HIV-positive Ukrainian citizens were barred from travelling abroad and HIV-positive foreigners were forbidden to enter Ukraine.

=== Harm reduction programs ===
Since 2003, drug substitution programs have been introduced in Ukraine. By the end of September 2008, they were offered to about 2200 persons in 38 locations. Mostly Buprenorphine (Trademark ‘Subutex‘) is dispensed, which is significantly more expensive than methadone. It is also less frequently used and thoroughly researched worldwide. Buprenophine is more accepted by society and politicians, however, because it is seen as a painkiller, while methadone, in contrast, is viewed as a drug prescribed at the public's expense.

In 2012 patients and advocacy groups complained of occasional supply shortages in Ukrainian AIDS clinics. In June 2012 advocacy groups accused Health Ministry officials of embezzling money that should be used to treat AIDS patients, by buying AIDS drugs at hugely inflated prices and then receiving kickbacks.

In the War in Donbas, the separatist authorities of the Donetsk People's Republic and Luhansk People's Republic have banned methadone and substitution therapy and have taken a hard line on drug addiction and have banned most international medical organizations. As a result, people living with HIV/AIDS fled separatist-controlled areas.

== National response ==
The policy and legal environment in Ukraine is generally favorable for combating the spread of HIV/AIDS, but there is a gap between national-level policies and laws and local-level practices. The National AIDS Committee was established in 1992 but was dissolved in 1998 because of budget disputes. In 1999, the government created the National AIDS Control Coordinating Council under the Cabinet and mandated that all regions establish HIV prevention programs. In 2001, a national plan for combating HIV/AIDS was approved; its goals included preventing the further spread of HIV, developing the capacity to treat infected individuals, and providing social support and counseling for those living with HIV/AIDS.

Although the HIV/AIDS law is one of the most progressive in the region, the government still treats HIV/AIDS primarily as a medical issue. Prevention activities have been largely funded by international organizations. Because HIV testing is limited to government facilities, those at greatest risk are not being reached, since marginalized populations are the least likely to use government facilities. Stigma by the medical profession against persons living with HIV/AIDS is a major barrier to accessing information and services.

The first Ukrainian advocate group of/for Ukrainian AIDS patients was launched on December 10, 2010.

== Statistics ==
Note: all statistics till late 2007.

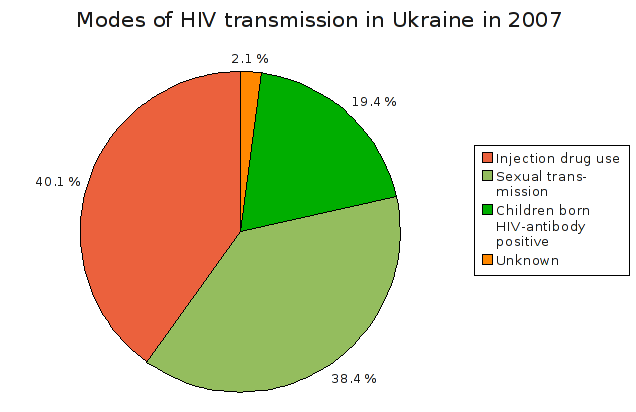
Modes of HIV transmission in Ukraine in 2007

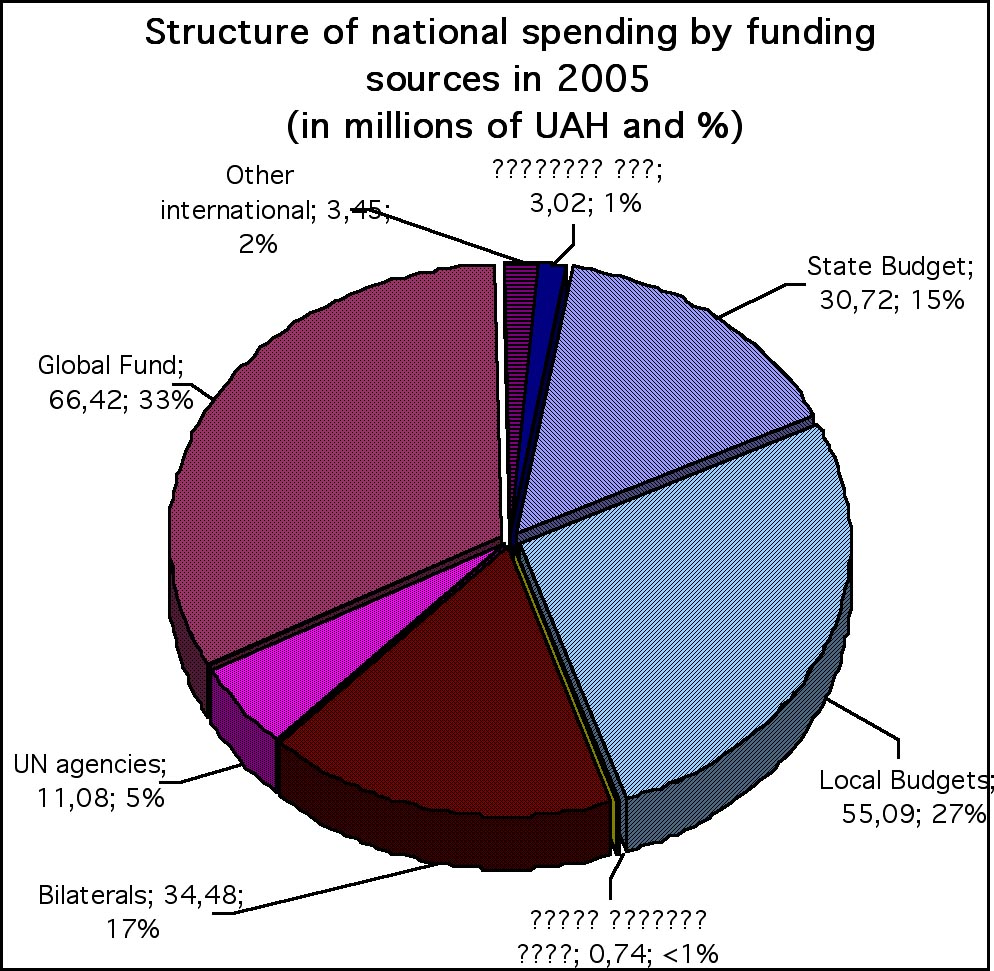
Structure of national anti-AIDS spending in 2005

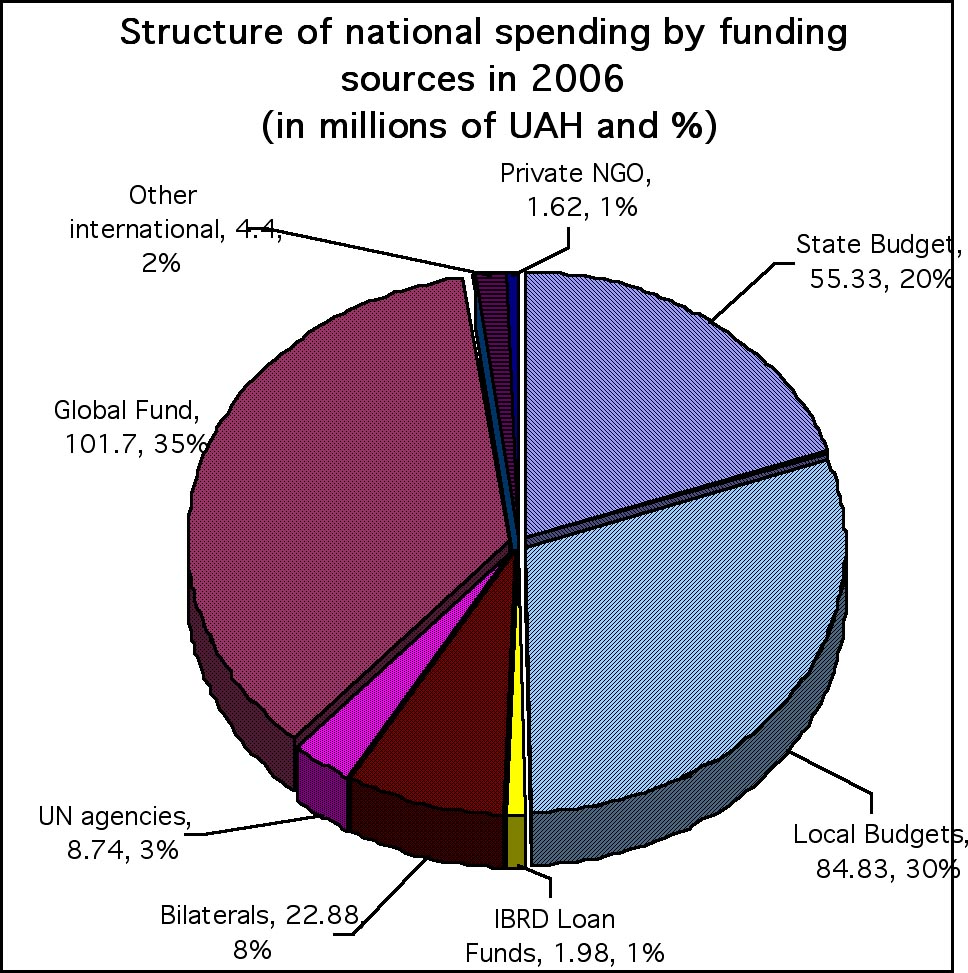
Structure of national anti-AIDS spending in 2006

== See also ==
- Health in Ukraine
