= Prisons in Ukraine =

Prisons in Ukraine are regulated by the State Penitentiary Service of Ukraine, a part of the Ministry of Justice of Ukraine.

As of 2000, there are 32 preliminary prisons, 131 penitentiary establishments for adults and 8 colonies for minor criminals in Ukraine. According to Amnesty International, torture and ill-treatment by the police is widespread in Ukrainian prisons. Several police officers have been arrested for allegedly torturing detainees.

== Prison population ==
In early 2010, there were over 147,000 people in prison and more than 38,000 in pre-trial detention facilities in Ukraine, a total three times that of Western European countries, and half as much as in the United States. In 2009, the number of inmates in Ukraine rose for the first time in seven years. Coupled with this increase was a higher instance of suicide (44 prisoners) and HIV (761 deaths therefrom) in penal institutions during 2009; the former compares with 40 suicides in 2008. Between 1996 and 2001, about 26 percent of inmates in various prisons across Ukraine tested HIV-positive. In a January 2006 study, between 15 and 30 percent of prisoners tested HIV-positive. In early 2005, tests showed up to 95 percent of prisoners were hepatitis C positive. In 2011, 6,000 inmates had HIV and 5,500 suffered from an active form of tuberculosis.

In there were 2011 inmates who had been kept in pre-trial detention for up to 12 years; there was no legal limit as to length of such incarceration.

According to Ukrainian authorities in January 2026 there were around 34,600 inmates in the entire Ukrainian penitentiary system.

== Conditions ==
Convicts in Ukrainian prisons work 7 or 8 hours a day, except for weekends. Prisoners get to keep part of the money raised from the sale of the items they produce. They are limited to four pairs of shoes. Computers, cell phones and other electronic gadgets are strictly forbidden in jail. Bathing may be limited to once a week.

According to the US Department of State Human Rights Report 2009, conditions in prisons and detention facilities in Ukraine are harsh, and pretrial detention was seen as arbitrary and lengthy. According to Amnesty International, allegations of torture and ill treatment in police custody increased in 2010.

In 2021 Amnesty International reported that the abuse of prisoners remained "endemic".

In March 2022 the European Court of Human Rights had ruled against Ukraine in 115 cases . The European Court found that Oleksandr Rafalsky had spent 15 years in prison despite good reasons to believe that his "confessions" had been extorted by torture.

== See also ==
- Lukyanivska Prison
- Ukraine prison ministry
- Incarceration in Ukraine
