= Poverty in Ukraine =

Poverty in Ukraine spiked after the Dissolution of the Soviet Union and then substantially declined, before flattening in the twenty-first century.

A large percentage of Romani people in Ukraine live in poverty.

== History ==
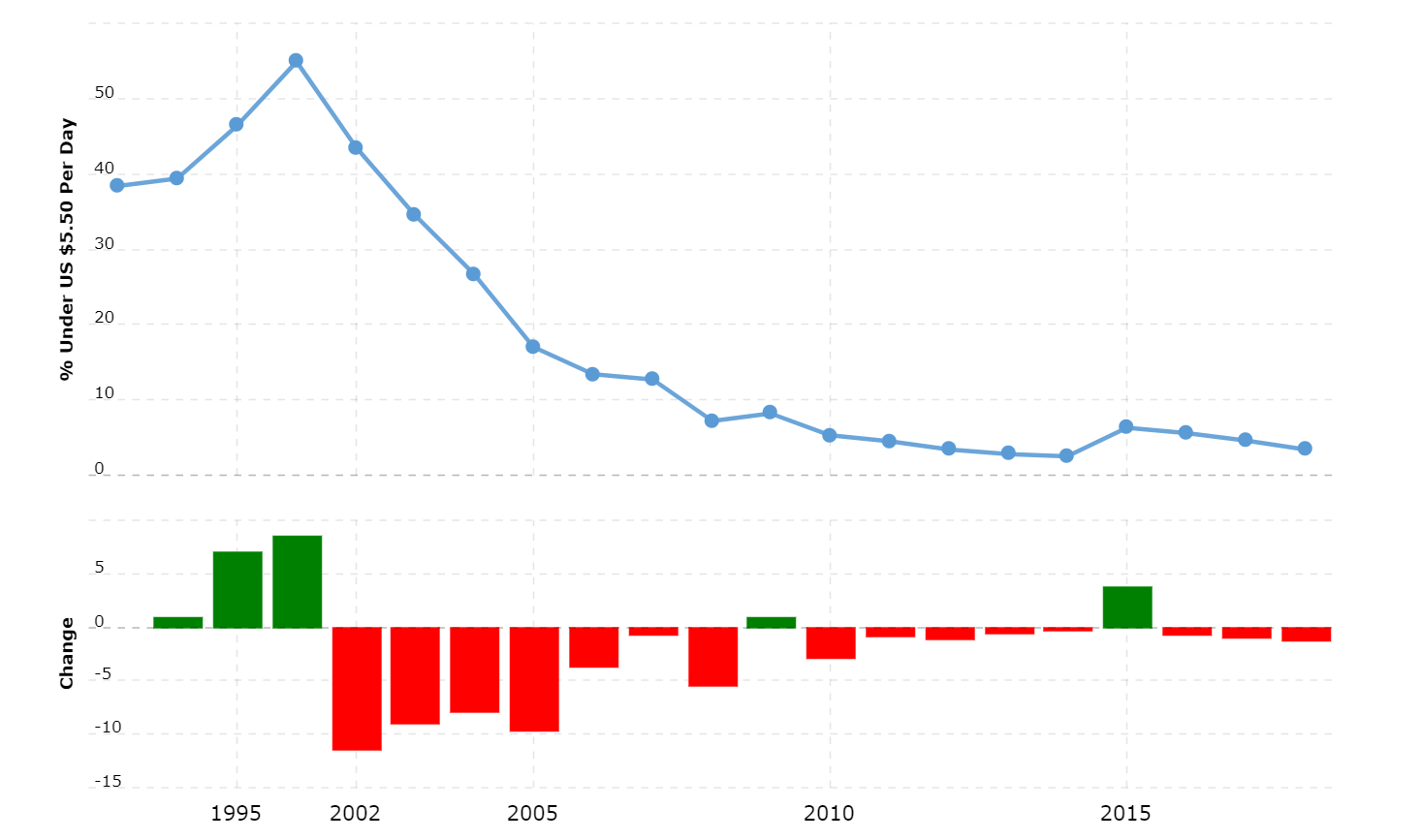
Ukraine poverty rate

In 2003, expectations of a poor grain harvest, led prices for staple food products to jump in the late spring. The initial reaction of the government was to control prices by restricting producer profitability and retail mark-ups. In some oblasts direct government intervention was replaced by money transfers to vulnerable groups.

From 2008 to 2013, the level of poverty in Ukraine increased or decreased slightly. Its maximum value was 25.8% in 2011. Poverty increased sharply after the annexation of Crimea and the start of the war in Donbas. In 2014, the poverty rate was 28.6%, and the following year it doubled to 58.3%. In 2016, the poverty rate reached 58.6%. After peaking in 2015–2016, it began to decline: 2017 - 47.3%, 2018 - 43.2%; 2019 - 37.8%. In 2018, 1.3% of the population was extremely poor, defined as living on less than $5 a day. The majority of the population can meet basic needs. However, they do not have extra income. Rich people make up about 5%.

=== Effects of COVID-19 ===
The M.V. Ptukha Institute of Demography and Social Research of the National Academy of Sciences ("Institute") published a study on the impact of COVID-19 on poverty. According to its results, by the end of 2020, 45% of the population of Ukraine fell into the poor category. The study claimed that this was 6.5 percentage points higher than in 2019. A pre-COVID-19 study forecast the poverty rate in 2020 to be 31.2%. The study stated that the real increase in poverty was 13.8 percentage points.

The study predicted that close to half of Ukrainians would experience poverty in 2020 - 2021. The study defines poverty as income below the minimum subsistence level, which varied between an average of ₴3,237 and ₴3,636 ($115–130) per person in 2019. The "minimum subsistence level" is much higher than the legally defined average of ₴2,118 ($75), as established in June. The study pointed to pandemic as reversing recent trends of stable or declining poverty.

According to the study, 60% of respondents said they had financial losses – 38% had a decline in regular income, 16% lost income entirely and 14% lost their jobs. The results reflect May findings by the Ministry of Social Policy, which estimated that the poverty rate had increased to 45% in 2020.

=== 2022 Russian invasion of Ukraine ===
The start of the 2022 Russian invasion of Ukraine has triggered a major humanitarian crisis in Ukraine: according to the United Nations Development Programme, a prolonged conflict will cause 30% of the Ukrainian population to fall below the poverty line, while a further 62% would be at risk of also falling into poverty within a year. The International Monetary Fund predicted that Ukraine's gross domestic product (GDP) will suffer a decrease from a minimum of 10% to a maximum of 35%; the European Bank for Reconstruction and Development also predicted that the invasion will cause a 20% decrease of Ukraine's GDP.

== Child poverty ==
As in families everywhere, those with children suffer disproportionately more from poverty. Children are often born to young parents with limited income. According to the United Nations Children's Fund, childbirth benefits in Ukraine decreased the poverty rate among its beneficiaries from 66.4% to 59.9%. The monthly payment has not been revised since 2014, and is half the size of the officially approved subsistence level.

== Regional distribution ==
The analysis of poverty was conducted using the household survey data for 2001 provided by the State Statistics Service of Ukraine. In 2001 32.7% of the population was living on less than ₴150 per month per capita. In 2002 this figure declined to 26%, taking into account the introduction of a Consumer Price Index in 2002.
