= Gender inequality in Ukraine =

Parity of the two genders in various spheres of life

Gender inequality in Ukraine refers to economic, social, political and education inequalities between men and women in Ukraine. According to multiple reports it is an ongoing issue on each level of the Ukrainian society, where discrimination against women is part of everyday life. The root causes of the circumstances are reportedly related to patriarchal attitudes and deeply entrenched gender stereotypes in the traditional Ukrainian culture. The cultural environment in Ukraine is aggravated by a poor rule of law, insufficient power of the social institutions and lack of political will.

In response to such concerns the Ukrainian government tried to develop various legislation, especially concerning institutional and personal gender discrimination. However, the practical implementation of the legal system and the law enforcement remain to be inadequately performed, and Ukrainian men and women still face different kinds of discrimination (legal, political etc.) The practice affects many aspects of their everyday lives from career development to health issues and results in a high level of violence directed towards women and men.

Since the beginning of 2022 Russian invasion of Ukraine, men from 18 to 60 years old are prohibited from leaving Ukraine, systematically putting men at greater risk of harm and death.

In 2017, Ukraine ranked 88th out of 189 countries on the United Nations Development Programme's Gender Inequality Index (GII).

== Women in politics ==
According to collected research statistics the Ukrainian women are underrepresented in Ukrainian political life. This is a very important issue because the extent of women's involvement in politics and their access to decision-making is a key indicator of gender equality in a society.

During the Soviet period of the Ukrainian history the share of women in Supreme Council of the Ukrainian Soviet Socialist Republic (Ukrainian SSR) was as high as 30%. It was a result of a strict non-official quota for women in elected office imposed by the Communist Party of the USSR. After receiving independence, women's public participation at many levels of Ukrainian politics significantly declined. For example, after the first elections in newly independent Ukraine, women filled only 3% of positions in the Ukrainian Parliament (12 females among 463 Deputies). Later In 2002, although one-fifth of parliamentary candidates were women, they filled only 5.1% of parliamentary seats, one of the lowest ratios of female representation in the region. At present after elections of 2014 the representation of women in Verkhovna Rada is around 12%.

== Economic inequality and gender pay gap ==
In average Ukrainian females have higher educational levels than males, but women tend to cluster in poorly paid occupations and earn about 70% of the men's wages. The widest gender gap in the salaries has been detected in the financial sphere, while the smallest gap exists in agriculture, where the wages are generally much lower than in all other parts of the Ukrainian economy.

Many provisions of Ukrainian legislation have been criticized by international bodies as they create obstacles to women's participation in the local labor market as well as impose restrictions on women's economic opportunities. An analysis of the gathered evidences indicate that a gender discrimination in hiring process is commonplace, despite being prohibited by the Ukrainian law. As a rule it is very hard for a woman past 40 to get a job, females are dismissed more often than males and often suffer from sexual harassment at work. Therefore, Ukrainian women are over-represented in informal sector of economy, where they perform noncontractual work. This kind of economic activity provides them a basic income, but not pensions or other social benefits.
