= Violence against women in Ukraine =

Public health issue of violent acts against women

Violence against women is an entrenched social problem in Ukrainian culture engendered by traditional male and female stereotypes. It was not recognized during Soviet era, but in recent decades the issue became an important topic of discussion in Ukrainian society and among academic scholars.

== History ==
=== 2010s ===
Nuzhat Ehsan, UN Population Fund representative in Ukraine, stated in February 2013 that "Ukraine really has an unacceptable level of violence, mainly by men and mainly due to [the] high level of alcohol consumption". He blamed loopholes in the legislation as contributing to the problem of domestic violence, stating, "You can violate women and still if you are a high-level official or from a high-level official family, you can get away with it".

In the view of traditional moral norms the Ukrainian women are supposed "to be beautiful and to be a mother". Moreover, the gender traditions in Ukraine tend to restrict women from holding positions of political power, while standards of male behaviour include being protective of women. The war in Donbas, which started in 2014, reinforced the separation of gender responsibilities. The UN stated that Ukrainian women living in the conflict zone were at significant risk due to weak law enforcement, high concentration of military groups and proliferation of weapons.

In 2015, the Office of the United Nations High Commissioner for Human Rights expressed deep concern about the rapidly worsening situation with violence against women in Ukraine. According to the OSCE, in 2018, violence towards women was widespread in Ukraine and was associated with three times more deaths than the war in Donbas.

=== 2020s ===
Following the 2022 Russian invasion of Ukraine, numerous accounts of violence and sexual violence against women in Ukraine emerged, including assault, torture, rape and gang-rape.

== Studies and responses to sexual violence ==
According to a UN Report in 2013, around 45 percent of Ukraine's population of 45 million suffered violence – physical, sexual or mental – and most of them are women. From the historical point of view, the problem of violence against women in Ukraine was traditionally kept silent. As of 2013, there were not many sources of official statistics on sexual violence in Ukraine. Mass media were unsure of how to approach the issue, the authorities did not know how to deal with it and Ukrainian society as a whole was not prepared to end the violence. As a result, all national anti-violence efforts relied on considerable support from Western donors. The recorded data also demonstrates that the observed incidence of sexual violence against women is strongly underestimated due to a combined influence of tradition and personal shame.

== Forms of violence ==
=== Domestic violence ===
In Ukraine domestic violence towards women has a long history. There is evidence that the model of male aggression directed towards women is transferred from generation to generation. Recent studies reveal that violence against women is not limited to any particular segment of the Ukrainian population and occurs across all social layers. There are not many Ukrainian women who have achieved economic independence and own their own home. As of 2017, violence against women remained a hidden problem. The War in Donbas led to an increase in prevalence.

In early 2020 there were very few women's shelters in Ukraine.

=== Sexual exploitation ===
The sexual exploitation of women is also a broad and serious problem in Ukrainian society. This issue consists of women's trafficking on the transnational markets and coercive prostitution. It comes up as a result of many factors including the impoverishment of significant part of population, soft pornography widely used by Ukrainian mass media to catch an attention of customers, and so on. Statistical data reported by NGOs in 2000 state that up to one third of young jobless Ukrainian women have been involved to some degree in illegal sex business activities.

=== Violence against children ===
A survey of young Ukrainian girls performed by All-Ukrainian Committee for the Protection of Children reveals that a sexual abuse of them accounts for high proportion of the abuse victims. For example, it was reported that one Ukrainian girl out of three had experienced sexual harassment, one out of five had suffered physical sexual abuse, one out of ten had been raped. Criminal statistics reports that 55% of registered sexual assaults in Ukraine are directed towards youth under 18, and 40% of them or 22% in total - towards children under 14.

== Legislation ==
Ukraine signed the Council of Europe Convention on Preventing and Combating Violence against Women and Domestic Violence – better known as the Istanbul Convention – in 2011. After 11 years of political debate, the Verkhovna Rada voted in favour of its ratification (259 votes against 8) on 20 June 2022. Ukraine submitted its instrument of ratification on 18 July 2022, meaning the Convention will enter into force in Ukraine on 1 November 2022.

=== Sexual violence ===
Since 6 December 2017, committing sexual acts involving another person's body without that person's voluntary sexual consent is punishable as 'rape' or 'sexual violence' under Ukrainian law. As of August 2022, Article 152 of the Criminal Code of Ukraine states: 'Note: Consent shall be deemed voluntary if it is the result of a person's free act and deed, with due account of attending circumstances.' Article 152(1) stipulates: 'Committing sexual acts involving vaginal, anal or oral penetration into the body of another person using the genitals or any other item, without the voluntary consent of the victim (rape) – shall be punishable by imprisonment for a term of three to five years.' Article 153(1) stipulates: 'Committing any sexual violence, not related to the penetration into another person's body, without the voluntary consent of the victim (sexual violence) – shall be punishable by imprisonment for a term of up to five years.' Paragraph 4 of both articles determines that people below the age of 14 are deemed incapable of consenting, and that punishment for the perpetrator in such cases is more severe.

The current legislation, including the importance of consent (Ukrainian: згода, romanized: zhóda), was adopted following amendments of the Criminal Code on 6 December 2017 'in order to implement the provisions of the Council of Europe Convention on Preventing and Combating Violence against Women and Domestic Violence' (Istanbul Convention). The previous text of the Criminal Code of Ukraine, as adopted in 2001, had coercion-based definitions of rape and sexual violence, with Article 152(1) stating: 'Rape, that is, sexual intercourse with the use physical violence, threat of its use or with taking advantage of the helpless state of the victim – is punishable by imprisonment for a term of three to five years.' Article 153 was originally titled "Violent gratification of sexual passion in an unnatural way", and paragraph 1 defined this as: "Satisfaction of sexual passion in an unnatural way with application of physical violence, threat of its application or with the use of helpless condition of the victim – shall be punishable by imprisonment for a term of up to five years."

=== Domestic violence ===
In February 2019 domestic violence was made a criminal offense in Ukraine meaning perpetrators could be fined, or sentenced to community service or a prison sentence. Previously perpetrators could be subjected to a maximum of administrative punishment.

== The Russo-Ukrainian war and women ==
The war in Ukraine has precipitated a crisis with particularly severe impacts on women and girls. Since the start of the 2022 Russian invasion, there has been a significant increase in gender-based violence, including domestic violence and trafficking. The destruction of infrastructure has severely limited access to essential services for survivors, heightening the challenges they face. Amidst these conditions, nearly 18 million Ukrainians are in dire need of aid, with human rights abuses, especially acts of sexual violence, increasing and necessitating urgent investigation and support for survivors. It is critical for women to be included in decision-making processes related to conflict resolution, prevention, and peace-building to address the unique burdens they face and ensure comprehensive support and security for all affected individual.

In the first five months of 2023, the Ukrainian National Police reported a significant 51% surge in domestic violence cases, with figures reaching 349,355, up from 231,244 during the same timeframe in 2022, and 190,277 in 2021. This alarming rise is attributed to increased stress, economic hardship, unemployment, and trauma stemming from the war. A notable case is the city of Dnipro, which has become a central hub for individuals fleeing the fighting, where a relief center run by the government and the United Nations Population Fund (UNFPA) has provided support to hundreds of survivors, predominantly women. However, the actual incidence of domestic violence is believed to be higher than reported, as only a fraction of survivors file complaints with the police. The redirection of state resources from gender-based violence prevention to defense, coupled with stretched state budgets, raises concerns about the capacity to address and prevent violence effectively. This situation highlights the enduring challenges that will likely persist and potentially worsen as the invasion continues.
